= List of 2018–19 Indian Super League season roster changes =

2018–19 Indian Super League season roster changes
- Season: 2018–19 Indian Super League

This is a list of all roster changes that occurred prior to the 2018–19 Indian Super League.

== Player movement and other transactions ==
=== Team changes ===
Date	Name	Previous club	ISL club	Notes
10 March 2018	(India) Michael Soosairaj	(India) Chennai City	Jamshedpur	Free
20 March 2018	(India) Lenny Rodrigues	Bengaluru	Goa	Free
22 March 2018	(Nigeria) Kalu Uche	Delhi Dynamos	ATK	Free
13 April 2018	(India) Sinivasan Pandiyan	(India) Chennai City	Chennaiyin	Free
17 April 2018	(India) Pratik Chaudhari	Delhi Dynamos	Jamshedpur	Free
17 April 2018	(India) Sena Ralte	Delhi Dynamos	ATK	Free
26 April 2018	(India) Subhasish Roy Chowdhury	Kerala Blasters	Jamshedpur	Free
26 April 2018	(India) Tondonba Singh	(India) NEROCA	Chennaiyin	Free
22 May 2018	(India) Aiborlang Khongjee	Mumbai City	ATK	Free
25 May 2018	(India) Yumnam Singh	(India) NEROCA	ATK	Free
2 June 2018	(India) Dheeraj Singh Moirangthem	(India) Indian Arrows	Kerala Blasters	Free
3 June 2018	(India) Kean Lewis	Pune City	Bengaluru	Free
4 June 2018	(India) Subhasish Bose	Bengaluru	Mumbai City	Free
4 June 2018	(England) John Johnson	Bengaluru	ATK	Free
6 June 2018	(India) Raju Gaikwad	Mumbai City	Jamshedpur	Free
6 June 2018	(India) Rino Anto	Kerala Blasters	Bengaluru	Free
6 June 2018	(India) Balwant Singh	Mumbai City	ATK	Free
7 June 2018	(India) Sanjiban Ghosh	Jamshedpur	Chennaiyin	Free
7 June 2018	(India) Nikhil Bernard	(India) Gokulam Kerala	Chennaiyin	Free
8 June 2018	(India) Daniel Lalhlimpuia	Bengaluru	Delhi Dynamos	Free
8 June 2018	(India) Souvik Chakrabarti	Jamshedpur	Mumbai City	Free
8 June 2018	(India) Anas Edathodika	Jamshedpur	Kerala Blasters	Free
11 June 2018	(India) Siam Hanghal	Kerala Blasters	Delhi Dynamos	Free
11 June 2018	(India) Gursimrat Singh Gill	NorthEast United	Bengaluru	Free
11 June 2018	(India) Sairuat Kima	Jamshedpur	Bengaluru	Free
12 June 2018	(India) Halicharan Narzary	NorthEast United	Kerala Blasters	Free
13 June 2018	(India) Bikramjit Singh	Chennaiyin	Delhi Dynamos	Free
13 June 2018	(India) Rana Gharami	(India) Mohun Bagan	Delhi Dynamos	Free
14 June 2018	(India) Dhanachandra Singh	Chennaiyin	Jamshedpur	Free
16 June 2018	(India) Mohammed Rafique	(India) East Bengal	Mumbai City	Free
17 June 2018	(India) Narayan Das	Goa	Delhi Dynamos	Free
19 June 2018	(India) Sanjay Balmuchu	Chennaiyin	Jamshedpur	Free
19 June 2018	(India) Abdul Nediyodath	NorthEast United	Kerala Blasters	Free
22 June 2018	(India) Laldinliana Renthlei	(India) Aizawl	Chennaiyin	Free
22 June 2018	(India) Zohmingliana Ralte	Bengaluru	Chennaiyin	Free
22 June 2018	(India) Isaac Vanmalsawma	Pune City	Chennaiyin	Free
25 June 2018	(Bhutan) Chencho Gyeltshen	(India) Minerva Punjab	Bengaluru	Free
25 June 2018	(India) Naveen Kumar	Goa	Kerala Blasters	Free
27 June 2018	(India) Jithin M.S.	(India) Kerala	Kerala Blasters	₹5 lakh
29 June 2018	(India) Jackichand Singh	Kerala Blasters	Goa	Free
29 June 2018	(India) Seiminlen Doungel	NorthEast United	Kerala Blasters	Free
1 July 2018	(India) Arindam Bhattacharya	Mumbai City	ATK	Free
1 July 2018	(India) Pronay Halder	Goa	ATK	Free
3 July 2018	(India) Shouvik Ghosh	Jamshedpur	Mumbai City	Free
3 July 2018	(France) Cyril Kali	(Greece) Apollon Pontus	Kerala Blasters	Free
6 July 2018	(India) Raynier Fernandes	(India) Mohun Bagan	Mumbai City	Free
6 July 2018	(Spain) Xisco Hernández	(Spain) Atlético Baleares	Bengaluru	Free
6 July 2018	(Serbia) Slaviša Stojanović	(Serbia) Radnički Niš	Kerala Blasters	Free
8 July 2018	(India) Lalthuammawia Ralte	Bengaluru	Goa	Free
8 July 2018	(Serbia) Matej Poplatnik	(Serbia) Triglav Kranj	Kerala Blasters	Free
9 July 2018	(India) Soram Anganba	(India) Mohun Bagan	Bengaluru	Free
9 July 2018	(India) Gabriel Fernandes	(India) East Bengal	Pune City	Free
9 July 2018	(India) Shankar Sampingiraj	ATK	Pune City	Free
9 July 2018	(India) Zakeer Mundampara	Mumbai City	Kerala Blasters	Free
10 July 2018	(India) Anwar Ali	ATK	Mumbai City	Free
12 July 2018	(India) Nirmal Chettri	NorthEast United	Goa	Free
13 July 2018	(Morocco) Noussair El Maimouni	(Morocco) Ittihad Tanger	ATK	Free
16 July 2018	(Spain) Manuel Lanzarote	Goa	ATK	Free
17 July 2018	(India) Alen Deory	(India) Shillong Lajong	Mumbai City	Free
20 July 2018	(Senegal) Mourtada Fall	(Morocco) Moghreb Tétouan	Goa	Free
20 July 2018	(India) Milan Singh	Kerala Blasters	Mumbai City	Free
23 July 2018	(India) Robin Singh	ATK	Pune City	Free
25 July 2018	(India) Ravi Kumar	NorthEast United	Mumbai City	Free
26 July 2018	(India) Nikhil Poojari	(India) East Bengal	Pune City	Free
26 July 2018	(India) Alwyn George	Bengaluru	Pune City	Free
28 July 2018	(India) Girik Khosla	(India) Minerva Punjab	NorthEast United	Free
28 July 2018	(India) Gurwinder Singh	(India) East Bengal	NorthEast United	Free
28 July 2018	(India) Kivi Zhimomi	(India) Gokulam Kerala	NorthEast United	Free
28 July 2018	(India) Nikhil Kadam	(India) Mohun Bagan	NorthEast United	Free
28 July 2018	(India) Pawan Kumar	Chennaiyin	NorthEast United	Free
28 July 2018	(India) Pawan Kumar	Pune City	NorthEast United	Free
28 July 2018	(India) Provat Lakra	(India) Gokulam Kerala	NorthEast United	Free
28 July 2018	(India) Redeem Tlang	(India) Shillong Lajong	NorthEast United	Free
28 July 2018	(India) Seityasen Singh	Delhi Dynamos	NorthEast United	Free
28 July 2018	(India) Simranjit Singh	Delhi Dynamos	NorthEast United	Free
30 July 2018	(India) Bikramjeet Singh	(India) Mohun Bagan	Mumbai City	Free
30 July 2018	(Brazil) Gerson Vieira	(Japan) Renofa Yamaguchi	ATK	Free
30 July 2018	(India) Keenan Almeida	Chennaiyin	Pune City	Free
1 August 2018	(India) Bipin Singh	ATK	Mumbai City	Free
2 August 2018	(Canada) Iain Hume	Kerala Blasters	Pune City	Free
5 August 2018	(Spain) Carlos Peña	(Spain) Lorca	Goa	Free
6 August 2018	(Spain) Andrea Orlandi	(Italy) Novara	Chennaiyin	Free
7 August 2018	(India) Anwar Ali	(India) Minerva Punjab	Mumbai City	Free
9 August 2018	(Spain) Marcos Tébar	Pune City	Delhi Dynamos	Free
9 August 2018	(India) Ankit Mukherjee	(India) Mohammedan	ATK	Free
9 August 2018	(India) Arnab Mondal	(India) East Bengal	ATK	Free
9 August 2018	(India) Avilash Paul	(India) Aizawl	ATK	Free
9 August 2018	(India) Sheikh Faiaz	(India) Mohun Bagan	ATK	Free
10 August 2018	(Spain) Carlos Calvo	(Spain) Recreativo Huelva	Jamshedpur	Free
10 August 2018	(Spain) Pablo Morgado	(Spain) La Nucía	Jamshedpur	Free
10 August 2018	(Spain) Sergio Cidoncha	(Spain) Ponferradina	Jamshedpur	Free
11 August 2018	(Slovenia) Rene Mihelič	Chennaiyin	Delhi Dynamos	Free
13 August 2018	(Spain) Francisco Dorronsoro	(Spain) Lorca	Delhi Dynamos	Free
14 August 2018	(Spain) Miguel Palanca	(Cyprus) Anorthosis Famagusta	Goa	Free
14 August 2018	(India) Rupert Nongrum	ATK	NorthEast United	Free
17 August 2018	(Serbia) Andrija Kaluđerović	(Slovenia) Olimpija Ljubljana	Delhi Dynamos	Free
17 August 2018	(Uruguay) Matías Mirabaje	Delhi Dynamos	Mumbai City	Free
17 August 2018	(Uruguay) Martín Díaz	NorthEast United	Pune City	Free
18 August 2018	(Cameroon) André Bikey	Jamshedpur	ATK	Free
19 August 2018	(Serbia) Marko Klisura	(Uzbekistan) Buxoro	Mumbai City	Free
20 August 2018	(Brazil) Rafael Bastos	(Brazil) CRB	Mumbai City	Free
21 August 2018	(England) Matt Mills	(England) Barnsley	Pune City	Free
22 August 2018	(India) Ricky Lallawmawma	(India) Mohun Bagan	ATK	Free
23 August 2018	(Spain) Jonathan Vila	(Spain) Recreativo Huelva	Pune City	Free
24 August 2018	(Spain) Martí Crespí	(China) Nei Mongol Zhongyou	Delhi Dynamos	Free
24 August 2018	(Serbia) Nikola Krčmarević	(Faroe Islands) 07 Vestur	Kerala Blasters	Free
25 August 2018	(Brazil) Eli Sabiá	(Saudi Arabia) Al-Raed	Chennaiyin	Free
25 August 2018	(Nigeria) Bartholomew Ogbeche	(Netherlands) Willem II	NorthEast United	Free
27 August 2018	(Uruguay) Juan Cruz Mascia	(Uruguay) Plaza Colonia	NorthEast United	Free
28 August 2018	(Colombia) José David Leudo	(Colombia) Atlético Huila	NorthEast United	Free
28 August 2018	(Brazil) Éverton Santos	(Brazil) Botafogo SP	ATK	Free
29 August 2018	(Ghana) Augustine Okrah	(Egypt) Smouha	NorthEast United	Free
30 August 2018	(India) Keegan Pereira	ATK	NorthEast United	Free
31 August 2018	(Spain) Albert Serrán	(Morocco) Chabab Rif Al Hoceima	Bengaluru	Free
31 August 2018	(Palestine) Carlos Salom	(Thailand) Bangkok United	Chennaiyin	Loan
31 August 2018	(Spain) Adrià Carmona	(Spain) Lugo	Delhi Dynamos	Free
31 August 2018	(Netherlands) Gianni Zuiverloon	(Spain) Cultural Leonesa	Delhi Dynamos	Free
31 August 2018	(India) Pradeep Mohanraj	(India) Chennai City	Delhi Dynamos	Free
31 August 2018	(India) Amarjit Singh Kiyam	(India) Indian Arrows	Jamshedpur	Free
31 August 2018	(India) Aniket Jadhav	(India) Indian Arrows	Jamshedpur	Free
31 August 2018	(Portugal) Paulo Machado	(Portugal) Aves	Mumbai City	Free
1 September 2018	(Croatia) Mato Grgić	(Croatia) Inter Zaprešić	NorthEast United	Free
1 September 2018	(Croatia) Mislav Komorski	(Croatia) Inter Zaprešić	NorthEast United	Free
1 September 2018	(India) Boris Singh Thangjam	(India) Indian Arrows	ATK	Free
1 September 2018	(Australia) Tim Cahill	(England) Millwall	Jamshedpur	Free
3 September 2018	(Spain) Mario Arqués	(Spain) Alcoyano	Jamshedpur	Free
3 September 2018	(Senegal) Modou Sougou	(England) Sheffield Wednesday	Mumbai City	Free
4 September 2018	(Democratic Republic of the Congo) Arnold Issoko	(Portugal) Vitória	Mumbai City	Free
5 September 2018	(India) Abhijit Sarkar	(India) Indian Arrows	Chennaiyin	Free
5 September 2018	(India) Deepak Tangri	(India) Indian Arrows	Chennaiyin	Free
5 September 2018	(India) Rahim Ali	(India) Indian Arrows	Chennaiyin	Free
5 September 2018	(Uruguay) Federico Gallego	(Uruguay) Boston River	NorthEast United	Free
8 September 2018	(India) Vignesh Dakshinamurthy	(India) Ozone	Mumbai City	Free
18 September 2018	(India) Aditya Patra	(India) Bengaluru B	Bengaluru	Free
18 September 2018	(India) Altamash Sayed	(India) Bengaluru B	Bengaluru	Free
18 September 2018	(India) Ajay Chhetri	(India) Bengaluru B	Bengaluru	Free
18 September 2018	(India) Asheer Akhtar	(India) Bengaluru B	Bengaluru	Free
20 September 2018	(India) Gourav Mukhi	(India) Jamshedpur B	Jamshedpur	Free
20 September 2018	(India) Mobashir Rahman	(India) Jamshedpur B	Jamshedpur	Free
20 September 2018	(India) Vishal Das	(India) Jamshedpur B	Jamshedpur	Free
20 September 2018	(India) Malsawmzuala	Bengaluru	ATK	Free
22 September 2018	(India) Sayan Roy	Free Agent	Delhi Dynamos	Free
22 September 2018	(India) Amit Tudu	(India) Delhi Dynamos B	Delhi Dynamos	Free
22 September 2018	(India) Seiminmang Manchong	(India) Delhi Dynamos B	Delhi Dynamos	Free
22 September 2018	(India) Shubham Sarangi	(India) Delhi Dynamos B	Delhi Dynamos	Free
23 September 2018	(India) Hrishi Dhath	(India) Kerala Blasters B	Kerala Blasters	Free
23 September 2018	(India) Suraj Rawat	(India) Kerala Blasters B	Kerala Blasters	Free
24 September 2018	(India) Hendry Antonay	(India) Chennaiyin B	Chennaiyin	Free
24 September 2018	(India) Zonunmawia	(India) Chennaiyin B	Chennaiyin	Injury replacement
25 September 2018	(India) Ashutosh Mehta	ATK	Pune City	Free
26 September 2018	(India) Mohammed Nawaz	(India) Goa B	Goa	Free
26 September 2018	(India) Saviour Gama	(India) Goa B	Goa	Free
26 September 2018	(India) Imran Khan	(India) Goa B	Goa	Free
26 September 2018	(India) Princeton Rebello	(India) Goa B	Goa	Free
3 October 2018	(India) Jeakson Singh Thounaojam	(India) Indian Arrows	Kerala Blasters	Free
19 October 2018	(India) Joyner Lourenco	Bengaluru	Mumbai City	Injury replacement
18 November 2018	(Uruguay) Emiliano Alfaro	Pune City	ATK	Loan
24 November 2018	(Uruguay) Emiliano Alfaro	ATK	Pune City	Loan return
24 November 2018	(Australia) Eli Babalj	(Czech Republic) Mladá Boleslav	ATK	Free
30 November 2018	(India) Malsawmzuala	ATK	Jamshedpur	Loan
Mid-Season Break Roster Changes
22 December 2018	(India) Pritam Kotal	Delhi Dynamos	ATK	₹20 lakh
23 December 2018	(Spain) Edu García	(China) Zhejiang Greentown	ATK	Free
25 December 2018	(India) Nongdamba Naorem	(India) Minerva Punjab	Kerala Blasters	Free
10 January 2019	(Morocco) Zaid Krouch	(Morocco) Moghreb Tétouan	Goa	Free
12 January 2019	(Mexico) Ulises Dávila	(Mexico) Santos Laguna	Delhi Dynamos	Free

=== Unannounced signings ===
The following players have appeared either in a match or on the bench for an Indian Super League club without being announced as signed.

Name	Previous club	ISL club	Notes
(India) Mohammad Yasir	Goa	Pune City	Free

=== Released players ===
This list includes players who were released from their club and who have yet to sign with another Indian Super League club or who have left the league.

Date	Name	Released by	New club (Non-ISL)
17 March 2018	(Iceland) Guðjón Baldvinsson	Kerala Blasters	(Iceland) Stjarnan
17 March 2018	(Brazil) Éverton Santos	Mumbai City	(Brazil) Botafogo SP
20 March 2018	(Brazil) Gerson Vieira	Mumbai City	(Japan) Renofa Yamaguchi
24 March 2018	(India) Malemngamba Meitei	NorthEast United	(India) TRAU
29 March 2018	(Sweden) Maic Sema	NorthEast United	(Sweden) GIF Sundsvall
30 March 2018	(Bulgaria) Dimitar Berbatov	Kerala Blasters	Free Agent
21 April 2018	(Brazil) Matheus Gonçalves	Jamshedpur	(Brazil) Flamengo
21 May 2018	(India) Arnab Das Sharma	Delhi Dynamos	(India) Gokulam Kerala
22 May 2018	(India) Mehtab Hossain	Jamshedpur	(India) Mohun Bagan
23 May 2018	(India) Sushil Meitei	NorthEast United	(India) NEROCA
25 May 2018	(England) Conor Thomas	ATK	(England) Cheltenham Town
1 June 2018	(India) Darren Caldeira	ATK	(India) Mohun Bagan
1 June 2018	(Wales) David Cotterill	ATK	Retired
1 June 2018	(Spain) Jordi Montel	ATK	(Spain) Racing de Santander
1 June 2018	(India) Kunzang Bhutia	ATK	(India) Churchill Brothers
1 June 2018	(England) Martin Paterson	ATK	Retired
1 June 2018	(India) Nallappan Mohanraj	ATK	(India) Churchill Brothers
1 June 2018	(Republic of Ireland) Robbie Keane	ATK	Retired
1 June 2018	(India) Ronald Singh	ATK	(India) NEROCA
1 June 2018	(England) Ryan Taylor	ATK	(England) Fleetwood Town
1 June 2018	(England) Tom Thorpe	ATK	Free Agent
1 June 2018	(Portugal) Zequinha	ATK	(Portugal) Vitória
1 June 2018	(Spain) Toni	Bengaluru	(Cyprus) Nea Salamis Famagusta
1 June 2018	(Spain) Víctor Pérez	Bengaluru	Free Agent
1 June 2018	(Spain) Daniel Segovia	Bengaluru	(Spain) Racing de Santander
1 June 2018	(India) Shahinlal Meloly	Chennaiyin	Free Agent
1 June 2018	(India) Fulganco Cardozo	Chennaiyin	Free Agent
1 June 2018	(Nigeria) Jude Nworuh	Chennaiyin	Free Agent
1 June 2018	(Spain) Jaime Gavilán	Chennaiyin	(Spain) Alcorcón
1 June 2018	(India) David Ngaihte	Delhi Dynamos	(India) Tollygunge Agragami
1 June 2018	(Spain) Edu Moya	Delhi Dynamos	Free Agent
1 June 2018	(Venezuela) Gabriel Cichero	Delhi Dynamos	(Spain) L'Hospitalet
1 June 2018	(Curaçao) Guyon Fernandez	Delhi Dynamos	Free Agent
1 June 2018	(Netherlands) Jeroen Lumu	Delhi Dynamos	(Romania) Petrolul Ploiești
1 June 2018	(India) Munmun Lugun	Delhi Dynamos	Free Agent
1 June 2018	(Brazil) Paulinho	Delhi Dynamos	(Brazil) Ituano
1 June 2018	(India) Rowilson Rodrigues	Delhi Dynamos	(India) Churchill Brothers
1 June 2018	(India) Anthony D'Souza	Goa	Free Agent
1 June 2018	(India) Bruno Colaço	Goa	Free Agent
1 June 2018	(Spain) Manuel Arana	Goa	(Gibraltar) Europa
1 June 2018	(Spain) Sergio Juste	Goa	(Spain) L'Hospitalet
1 June 2018	(Nigeria) Izu Azuka	Jamshedpur	(Ethiopia) Fasil Kenema
1 June 2018	(Haiti) Kervens Belfort	Jamshedpur	(Bangladesh) Bashundhara Kings
1 June 2018	(South Africa) Sameehg Doutie	Jamshedpur	(Sweden) Värnamo
1 June 2018	(India) Siddharth Singh	Jamshedpur	Free Agent
1 June 2018	(India) Karan Sawhney	Kerala Blasters	Free Agent
1 June 2018	(India) Lalthakima	Kerala Blasters	Free Agent
1 June 2018	(England) Paul Rachubka	Kerala Blasters	Free Agent
1 June 2018	(India) Samuel Shadap	Kerala Blasters	Free Agent
1 June 2018	(India) Sandip Nandy	Kerala Blasters	Free Agent
1 June 2018	(England) Wes Brown	Kerala Blasters	Free Agent
1 June 2018	(Cameroon) Achille Emaná	Mumbai City	Free Agent
1 June 2018	(India) Biswajit Saha	Mumbai City	Free Agent
1 June 2018	(Brazil) Léo Costa	Mumbai City	Free Agent
1 June 2018	(Brazil) Márcio Rosário	Mumbai City	(Indonesia) Persipura Jayapura
1 June 2018	(India) Mehrajuddin Wadoo	Mumbai City	Free Agent
1 June 2018	(Spain) Rafa Jordà	Mumbai City	Free Agent
1 June 2018	(India) Rakesh Oram	Mumbai City	(India) Bengaluru B
1 June 2018	(India) Sahil Tavora	Mumbai City	(Portugal) GDSC Alvarenga
1 June 2018	(India) Ishan Debnath	NorthEast United	Free Agent
1 June 2018	(Portugal) José Gonçalves	NorthEast United	Free Agent
1 June 2018	(Guinea-Bissau) Sambinha	NorthEast United	(Portugal) 1º Dezembro
1 June 2018	(Brazil) Adilson	NorthEast United	(Brazil) Grêmio Novorizontino
1 June 2018	(India) Gurpreet Singh Chabhal	NorthEast United	Free Agent
1 June 2018	(India) Lalrindika Ralte	NorthEast United	(India) East Bengal
1 June 2018	(India) Ajay Singh	Pune City	(India) Gokulam Kerala
1 June 2018	(India) Baljit Sahni	Pune City	Free Agent
1 June 2018	(India) Harpreet Singh	Pune City	Free Agent
1 June 2018	(India) Jewel Raja	Pune City	(India) Mohammedan
8 June 2018	(Brazil) Jonatan Lucca	Pune City	(Portugal) Belenenses
8 June 2018	(India) Abhra Mondal	Bengaluru	Free Agent
8 June 2018	(India) Calvin Abhishek	Bengaluru	Free Agent
8 June 2018	(India) Collin Abranches	Bengaluru	Free Agent
12 June 2018	(Brazil) Danilo	NorthEast United	(Thailand) Kasetsart
15 June 2018	(Portugal) Hélio Pinto	NorthEast United	(Portugal) Louletano
16 June 2018	(India) Sebastian Thangmuansang	Pune City	(India) NEROCA
1 July 2018	(Brazil) Marcinho	NorthEast United	(Brazil) Criciúma
7 July 2018	(Spain) Rafa	Pune City	(Spain) Rayo Majadahonda
11 July 2018	(India) Amey Ranawade	Goa	(India) Mohun Bagan
11 July 2018	(India) Lalchhawnkima	Mumbai City	(India) Mohun Bagan
11 July 2018	(India) Abhinas Ruidas	Mumbai City	(India) Mohun Bagan
2 August 2018	(India) Ashim Biswas	Jamshedpur	(India) Tollygunge Agragami
31 August 2018	(Brazil) Wellington Priori	Jamshedpur	Free Agent
10 January 2019	(Serbia) Andrija Kaluđerović	Delhi Dynamos	Free Agent
10 January 2019	(Australia) Eli Babalj	ATK	Free Agent
10 January 2019	(Morocco) Noussair El Maimouni	ATK	Free Agent
29 January 2019	(Spain) Iñigo Calderón	Chennaiyin	Free Agent

=== Out on loan ===
Date	Name	ISL side	Loaned club
24 June 2018	(India) Prosenjit Chakraborty	Chennaiyin	(India) Mohammedan
31 August 2018	(India) Amarjit Singh Kiyam	Jamshedpur	(India) Indian Arrows
31 August 2018	(India) Aniket Jadhav	Jamshedpur	(India) Indian Arrows
5 September 2018	(India) Abhijit Sarkar	Chennaiyin	(India) Indian Arrows
5 September 2018	(India) Deepak Tangri	Chennaiyin	(India) Indian Arrows
5 September 2018	(India) Rahim Ali	Chennaiyin	(India) Indian Arrows
3 January 2019	(India) Imran Khan	Goa	(India) Gokulam Kerala
4 January 2019	(India) Siam Hanghal	Delhi Dynamos	(India) East Bengal
