= 2017–18 NorthEast United FC season =

2017–18 season of NorthEast United FC

NorthEast United
2017–18 season
- Owner: John Abraham
- Head Coach: João de Deus (until 2 January 2018); Avram Grant (remainder of season)
- Stadium: Indira Gandhi Athletic Stadium, Guwahati
- ISL: 10th
- AIFF Super Cup: Qualification round
- Top goalscorer: (India) Seiminlen Doungel (4) (Brazil) Marcinho (4)
- Highest home attendance: 21,151 vs Jamshedpur (18 November 2017)
- Lowest home attendance: 1,121 vs Kerala Blasters FC (17 February 2018)
- Average home league attendance: 8,217
Home colours	Away colours	Third colours

The 2017–18 NorthEast United FC season was the club's fourth season since its establishment in 2014 and their fourth season in the Indian Super League.

== Squad ==
=== Current squad ===
Squad No.	Name	Nationality	Position(s)	Date of birth (age)
Goalkeepers
1	Ravi Kumar	(India)	GK	4 July 1993 (age 33)
13	Rehenesh TP	(India)	GK	13 February 1993 (age 33)
31	Gurpreet Singh Chabhal	(India)	GK	15 July 1995 (age 31)
Defenders
3	Sambinha	(Guinea-Bissau)	CB / DM	23 September 1992 (age 34)
4	Nirmal Chettri	(India)	RB / RWB / CB / DM	21 October 1991 (age 35)
5	Jose Goncalves (C)	(Portugal)	CB / LWB / LB	13 September 1985 (age 41)
12	Reagan Singh	(India)	RB / RWB / CB	1 April 1991 (age 35)
15	Abdul Hakku	(India)	CB / RB	10 June 1994 (age 32)
16	Robert Lalthlamuana	(India)	LB / LM / RB	4 September 1988 (age 38)
21	Martin Diaz	(Uruguay)	CB / LB / DM	17 March 1988 (age 38)
33	Gursimrat Singh Gill	(India)	CB	11 February 1997 (age 29)
Midfielders
6	Maic Sema	(Sweden)	RM / LM / AM	2 December 1988 (age 37)
10	Marcinho	(Brazil)	AM / LW / RW	14 May 1986 (age 40)
14	Rowllin Borges	(India)	DM	5 June 1992 (age 34)
17	Sushil Meitei	(India)	LW / RW / AM	8 February 1997 (age 29)
18	Malemngamba Meitei	(India)	RW / AM / LW	5 January 1992 (age 34)
20	Lalrindika Ralte	(India)	LM / LW / CF	7 September 1992 (age 34)
23	Helio Pinto	(Portugal)	CM / DM / AM	29 February 1984 (age 42)
45	Fanai Lalrempuia	(India)	CM	11 May 1996 (age 30)
Strikers
9	Seiminlen Doungel	(India)	LW / CF / RW	3 January 1994 (age 32)
11	Halicharan Narzary	(India)	LW / CF / RW	10 May 1994 (age 32)
27	John Mosquera	(Colombia)	CF	15 January 1988 (age 38)
99	Danilo Lopes Cezario	(Brazil)	CF	25 April 1991 (age 35)

Last updated: 6 March 2018.

=== Players ===
Players and squad numbers last updated on 6 March 2018.
Note: Flags indicate national team as has been defined under FIFA eligibility rules. Players may hold more than one non-FIFA nationality.

N	Pos.	Nat.	Name	Age	Since	App	Goals	Ends	Transfer fee	Notes
1	GK	(India)	Ravi Kumar	33	2017	0	0	2018	Draft (₹1.5M)	Transfer fee paid to Minerva Punjab; Picked in draft.
13	GK	(India)	Rehenesh TP	33	2015	27	0	2019	Retained	Retained before draft.
31	GK	(India)	Gurpreet Singh Chabhal	31	2017	0	0	Undisclosed	Draft	Picked in draft.
3	DF	(Guinea-Bissau)	Sambinha	34	2017	0	0	Undisclosed	Loan	
4	DF	(India)	Nirmal Chettri	36	2016	8	0	Undisclosed	Draft	Retained in draft.
12	DF	(India)	Reagan Singh	35	2016	4	0	2018	Draft	Retained in draft.
15	DF	(India)	Abdul Hakku	32	2017	0	0	2018	Draft	Picked in draft.
16	DF	(India)	Robert Lalthlamuana	38	2017	0	0	2018	Draft	Picked in draft.
5	DF	(Portugal)	José Gonçalves	41	2017	0	0	Undisclosed	Free	
21	DF	(Uruguay)	Martín Díaz	38	2017	0	0	Undisclosed	Free	
33	DF	(India)	Gursimrat Singh Gill	29	2017	0	0	Undisclosed	Draft	Picked in draft.
8	MF	(Brazil)	Adilson	38	2017	0	0	Undisclosed	Free	
10	MF	(Brazil)	Marcinho	40	2017	0	0	2018	Free	
14	MF	(India)	Rowllin Borges	34	2016	13	0	2019	Retained	Retained before draft.
17	MF	(India)	Sushil Meitei	29	2017	0	0	2018	Draft	Picked in draft.
18	MF	(India)	Malemngamba Meitei	34	2017	0	0	2018	Draft	Picked in draft.
20	MF	(India)	Lalrindika Ralte	34	2017	0	0	Undisclosed	Draft	Picked in draft.
45	MF	(India)	Fanai Lalrempuia	30	2016	2	0	Undisclosed	Draft	Retained in draft.
7	FW	(Cape Verde)	Odaïr Fortes	39	2017	0	0	Undisclosed	Free	
9	FW	(India)	Seminlen Doungel	32	2017	10	1	2018	Draft	Picked in draft.
11	FW	(India)	Halicharan Narzary	32	2017	0	0	Undisclosed	Draft	Retained in draft.
19	FW	(Colombia)	Luis Páez	40	2017	0	0	Undisclosed	Free	
99	FW	(Brazil)	Danilo	35	2017	0	0	2018	Free	
23	MF	(Portugal)	Hélio Pinto	41	2018	0	0	Undisclosed	Free	Signed in Mid-season transfer window
6	MF	(Sweden)	Maic Sema	37	2018	0	0	Undisclosed	Free	Signed in Mid-season transfer window
27	FW	(Colombia)	John Mosquera	38	2018	0	0	Undisclosed	Free	Signed in Mid-season transfer window

- Last updated: 6 March 2018
- Source: Indian Super League
- Ordered by position.

== Background ==
2016 was another disappointing season for NorthEast United. NorthEast United started their campaign on a high note with two consecutive wins over Kerala Blasters and Goa. By mid-season NorthEast United lost all the momentum and had longest winless run of 5 matches (shared with Pune City and Chennaiyin) and longest losing run of 4 matches. By the end of season NorthEast United came very close to qualifying for knockout phase. In their final match of regular league phase NorthEast United needed a win against Kerala Blasters to proceed further, which they ended up losing 1–0 by conceding a goal at 66th minute. NorthEast United finished 5th on points table with 18 points from 14 matches. After the end of season, NorthEast United parted ways with coach Nelo Vingada on mutual consent.

=== Transfers ===
At the end of 2016 Indian Super League majority of domestic players from NorthEast United were loaned by or transferred to I-League clubs for 2016–17 season. After I-League season all loaned out players returned to club. However, due to the Indian Super League regulation each club was allowed to retain a maximum of two Indian players over the age of twenty-one (21) from previous squad.

NorthEast United announced on 17 July 2017 that João Carlos Pires de Deus will be taking over as head coach. Deus said:

I am a very positive man and I am very positive about the challenge that I have with NorthEast United FC. The club is new with a vibrant fan base and owners who have the right vision to develop football in the region. I can assure the fans that we will play positive football and that all the players and the staff will work hard. We will leave no stone unturned so that we can achieve our objectives. I believe that young players are important in any campaign and will ensure that they fit seamlessly into our setup. This year, we will be focused on playing good football and winning as many games as we can...taking it one game at a time.

On 8 July, NorthEast United announced they are retaining Rehenesh TP and Rowllin Borges for two years. Remaining players from previous squad who had returned from loans namely Nirmal Chettri, Reagan Singh, Fanai Lalrempuia, Subrata Pal, Seityasen Singh, Robin Gurung and Sumeet Passi went straight into players draft.

In ISL draft held on 23 July 2017, NorthEast United retained defenders Nirmal Chettri and Reagan Singh and midfielder Fanai Lalrempuia. NorthEast United added eight new players from draft, goalkeepers Ravi Kumar and Gurpreet Singh Chabhal, defenders Robert Lalthlamuana, Gursimrat Singh Gill and Abdul Hakku, midfielders Lalrindika Ralte, Malemngamba Meitei and Sushil Meitei. Forward Seminlen Doungel made his come back to NorthEast United for a second stint along with forward Halicharan Narzary.

In ISL draft, goalkeeper Subrata Pal, defender Robin Gurung and forward Sumeet Passi drafted to new expansion franchise Jamshedpur FC. Midfielder Seityasen Singh was picked by Delhi Dynamos.

On 13 September, NorthEast United announced their eight foreign singing namely defenders Martín Díaz, Sambinha and José Gonçalves, midfielders Adilson and Marcinho and forwards Luis Páez, Odaïr Fortes and Wellington da Silva on their official Twitter account from series of Tweets.

Wellington da Silva was later replaced by forward Danilo for unknown reasons.

==== Loan return and players draft ====
Loan Return				Draft / Retain			
Date	Pos.	Name	From	Date	To	Draft Round	Ref.
30 June 2017	GK	(India) Rehenesh TP	East Bengal	8 July 2017	Retained	Pre-draft	
30 June 2017	MF	(India) Rowllin Borges	East Bengal	8 July 2017	Pre-draft		
30 June 2017	GK	(India) Subrata Pal	DSK Shivajians	23 July 2017	Jamshedpur FC	Round 2	
30 June 2017	FW	(India) Halicharan Narzary	DSK Shivajians	23 July 2017	Retained	Round 3	
30 June 2017	DF	(India) Nirmal Chettri	DSK Shivajians	23 July 2017	Retained	Round 4	
30 June 2017	MF	(India) Seityasen Singh	DSK Shivajians	23 July 2017	Delhi Dynamos	Round 5	
30 June 2017	DF	(India) Robin Gurung	East Bengal	23 July 2017	Jamshedpur FC	Round 5	
30 June 2017	DF	(India) Reagan Singh	Mumbai F.C.	23 July 2017	Retained	Round 8	
30 June 2017	FW	(India) Sumeet Passi	DSK Shivajians	23 July 2017	Jamshedpur FC	Round 12	
30 June 2017	MF	(India) Fanai Lalrempuia	Minerva Punjab	23 July 2017	Retained	Round 13	

==== In ====
No.	Pos.	Name	From	Date	Type	Ref.
13	GK	(India) Rehenesh TP	(India) East Bengal	8 July 2017	Retained^{[n1]}	
14	MF	(India) Rowllin Borges	(India) East Bengal	8 July 2017	Retained^{[n1]}	
11	FW	(India) Halicharan Narzary	(India) DSK Shivajians	23 July 2017	Draft^{[n2]}	
4	DF	(India) Nirmal Chettri	(India) DSK Shivajians	23 July 2017	Draft^{[n2]}	
20	MF	(India) Lalrindika Ralte	(India) East Bengal	23 July 2017	Draft	
16	DF	(India) Robert Lalthlamuana	(India) East Bengal	23 July 2017	Draft	
9	FW	(India) Seminlen Doungel	(India) Bengaluru	23 July 2017	Draft	
12	DF	(India) Reagan Singh	(India) Mumbai F.C.	23 July 2017	Draft^{[n2]}	
1	GK	(India) Ravi Kumar	(India) Sporting Goa	23 July 2017	Draft	
33	DF	(India) Gursimrat Singh Gill	(India) Bengaluru	23 July 2017	Draft	
18	MF	(India) Malemngamba Meitei	(India) NEROCA	23 July 2017	Draft	
15	DF	(India) Abdul Hakku	(India) Fateh Hyderabad	23 July 2017	Draft	
45	MF	(India) Fanai Lalrempuia	(India) Minerva Punjab	23 July 2017	Draft^{[n2]}	
31	GK	(India) Gurpreet Singh Chabhal	(India) Delhi United	23 July 2017	Draft	
17	MF	(India) Sushil Meitei	(India) Royal Wahingdoh	23 July 2017	Draft	
19	FW	(Colombia) Luis Páez	(Colombia) Rionegro Águilas	13 September 2017	Free	
21	DF	(Uruguay) Martín Díaz	(Uruguay) Liverpool Montevideo	13 September 2017	Free	
3	DF	(Guinea-Bissau) Sambinha	(Portugal) Sporting CP	13 September 2017	Loan	
10	MF	(Brazil) Marcinho	Free Agent	13 September 2017	—	
5	DF	(Portugal) José Gonçalves	Free Agent	13 September 2017	—	
7	FW	(Cape Verde) Odaïr Fortes	Free Agent	13 September 2017	—	
8	MF	(Brazil) Adilson	Free Agent	13 September 2017	—	
99	FW	(Brazil) Danilo	Free Agent	13 September 2017	—	
23	MF	(Portugal) Helio Pinto	(Norway) Kongsvinger IL	1 January 2018	Free	
6	MF	(Colombia) Maic Sema	(Sweden) Örebro SK	20 January 2018	Free	
27	FW	(Sweden) John Mosquera	(Chile) La Serena	25 January 2018	Free	

n1. Player was retained by club before draft.
n2. Player was part of club's previous season squad but had to enter players draft due to the Indian Super League regulation.

== Pre-season and friendlies ==
NorthEast United began their pre-season training on 27 September. Squad gather in Imphal on 17 October for 10-day pre-season training camp where they played an exhibition match against NEROCA which ended as 2–0 in favor of NorthEast United.

After training in Imphal, club went to Antalya, Turkey for the final leg of the pre-season. In Turkey, NorthEast United played friendly matches against Iraqi top division sides Al-Kahraba FC, Al-Naft SC, Naft Al-Janoob SC, Al-Najaf FC and Turkish top division side Alanyaspor.

22 October 2017 Friendly	NEROCA (India)	0–2	(India) NorthEast United	Imphal, Manipur
14:00 IST (UTC+5:30)		Report	Danilo 57'; Sushil Meitei 89'	Stadium: Khuman Lampak Main Stadium

28 October 2017 Friendly	Al-Kahraba FC (Iraq)	1–0	(India) NorthEast United	Antalya, Turkey
		Report

31 October 2017 Friendly	Al-Naft SC (Iraq)	1–1	(India) NorthEast United	Antalya, Turkey
16:00 FET (UTC+03:00)		Report	Danilo

2 November 2017 Friendly	Naft Al-Janoob SC (Iraq)	1–2	(India) NorthEast United	Antalya, Turkey
		Report	Marcinho

5 November 2017 Friendly	Al-Najaf FC (Iraq)	1–0	(India) NorthEast United	Antalya, Turkey
		Report

7 November 2017 Friendly	Naft Al-Janoob SC (Iraq)	2–2	(India) NorthEast United	Antalya, Turkey
		Report	Luis Páez; Danilo

9 November 2017 Friendly	Alanyaspor (Turkey)	0–0	(India) NorthEast United	Antalya, Turkey
		Report

== Indian Super League ==
Pos	Team	Pld	W	D	L	GF	GA	GD	Pts
6	Kerala Blasters	18	6	7	5	20	22	−2	25
7	Mumbai City	18	7	2	9	25	29	−4	23
8	Delhi Dynamos	18	5	4	9	27	37	−10	19
9	ATK	18	4	4	10	16	30	−14	16
10	NorthEast United	18	3	2	13	12	27	−15	11

Source: Indian Super League
Rules for classification: 1) points; 2) head-to-head points; 3) head-to-head goal difference; 4) head-to-head goals scored; 5) goal difference; 5) number of goals scored; 6) fair play ranking; 6) drawing of lots

=== Results summary ===
Overall								Home						Away					
Pld	W	D	L	GF	GA	GD	Pts	W	D	L	GF	GA	GD	W	D	L	GF	GA	GD
18	3	2	13	12	27	−15	11	2	1	6	5	9	−4	1	1	7	7	18	−11

Last updated: 6 March 2018.
Source: Matches

=== Results by round ===
Round	1	2	3	4	5	6	7	8	9	10	11	12	13	14	15	16	17	18
Ground	H	A	A	H	A	H	A	H	H	H	A	A	H	A	H	H	A	A
Result	D	L	W	L	L	L	L	W	L	W	L	D	L	L	L	L	L	L

Updated to match(es) played on 6 March 2018. Source: Matches
A = Away; H = Home; W = Win; D = Draw; L = Loss

=== Matches ===
18 November 2017 1	NorthEast United	0–0	Jamshedpur	Guwahati
20:00 IST (UTC+5:30)		Report	Memo (yellow card) 32'; Bikey (red card) 77'; Doutie (yellow card) 78'	Stadium: Indira Gandhi Athletic Stadium; Attendance: 21,151; Referee: Tejas Nagvenkar; Man of the Match: Marcinho (NEUFC)

23 November 2017 2	Chennaiyin	3–0	NorthEast United	Chennai
20:00 IST (UTC+5:30)	Hakku 11' (o.g.); Augusto 24'; Ganesh (yellow card) 55'; Alves (yellow card) 81'; Rafi 84'	Report	Marcinho (yellow card) 57'; Danilo (yellow card) 87'	Stadium: Jawaharlal Nehru Stadium; Attendance: 16,795; Referee: S Kumar; Man of the Match: Raphael Augusto (Chennaiyin)

2 December 2017 3	Delhi Dynamos	0–2	NorthEast United	Delhi
20:00 IST (UTC+5:30)	Guyon (yellow card) 55'; Ngaihte (yellow card) 82'	Report	Marcinho 17'; Danilo 22' (yellow card) 90'; Rehenesh (yellow card) 90'	Stadium: Jawaharlal Nehru Stadium; Attendance: 11,453; Referee: O Thakur; Man of the Match: Halicharan Narzary (NEUFC)

8 December 2017 4	NorthEast United	0–1	Bengaluru	Guwahati
20:00 IST (UTC+5:30)	Nirmal (yellow card) 31'; Reagan (yellow card) 54'; Adilson (yellow card) 58'; Páez (yellow card) 90'	Report	John Johnson (yellow card) 26'; Khabra (yellow card) 38'; Miku 47'	Stadium: Indira Gandhi Athletic Stadium; Attendance: 16,972; Man of the Match: Miku (Bengaluru FC)

15 December 2017 5	Kerala Blasters	1–0	NorthEast United	Kochi
20:00 IST (UTC+5:30)	Vineeth 24'; Jhingan (yellow card) 55'; Sifneos (yellow card) 82'	Report	Rehenesh (red card) 43'; Páez (yellow card) 77'; Díaz (yellow card) 82'	Stadium: Jawaharlal Nehru Stadium; Attendance: 33,868; Man of the Match: Wes Brown (Kerala Blasters)

20 December 2017 6	NorthEast United	0–2	Mumbai City	Guwahati
20:00 IST (UTC+5:30)	Len (yellow card) 69'; Goncalves (yellow card) 86'	Report	Balwant 34', 68' (yellow card) 36'; Zakeer (yellow card) 79'	Stadium: Indira Gandhi Athletic Stadium; Attendance: 10,353; Man of the Match: Gerson Vieira(Mumbai City)

30 December 2017 7	Pune City	5–0	NorthEast United	Pune
20:00 IST (UTC+5:30)	Kuruniyan 8'; Marcelinho 27', 45', 86' (yellow card) 87'; Adil 88'	Report		Stadium: Balewadi Stadium; Attendance: 8,762; Man of the Match: Marcelinho (Pune City FC)

6 January 2018 8	NorthEast United	2–1	FC Goa	Guwahati
20:00 IST (UTC+5:30)	Marcinho 21'; Nirmal (yellow card) 23'; Len 52'; Borges (yellow card) 89'	Report	Arana 28' (yellow card) 90'	Stadium: Indira Gandhi Athletic Stadium; Attendance: 5,103; Referee: Rahul Kumar Gupta; Man of the Match: Marcinho (NEUFC)

12 January 2018 9	NorthEast United	0–1	Atlético de Kolkata	Guwahati
20:00 IST (UTC+5:30)	Nirmal (yellow card) 53'; Robert (yellow card) 87'	Report	Zequinha 73'; Pereira (yellow card) 86'; Taylor (yellow card) 89'	Stadium: Indira Gandhi Athletic Stadium; Attendance: 4,293; Man of the Match: Zequinha (atk)

19 January 2018 10	NorthEast United	3–1	Chennaiyin	Guwahati
20:00 IST (UTC+5:30)	Len 42', 46', 68' (yellow card) 62'	Report	Sereno (yellow card) 20'; Nelson (yellow card) 74'; Thapa 79'	Stadium: Indira Gandhi Athletic Stadium; Attendance: 3,211; Referee: Ranjit Baksi; Man of the Match: Seminlen Doungel (NEUFC)

26 January 2018 11	Bengaluru	2–1	NorthEast United	Bengaluru
20:00 IST (UTC+5:30)	Juanan 14'; Sunil 51'; Sandhu (yellow card) 70'; Harmanjot Khabra (yellow card) 78'	Report	Nirmal (yellow card) 41'; Marcinho 45'; Sambinha (yellow card) 70'	Stadium: Sree Kanteerava Stadium; Attendance: 15,272; Referee: O.P Thakur; Man of the Match: Juanan (Bengaluru)

4 February 2018 12	Goa	2–2	NorthEast United	Margao
20:00 IST (UTC+5:30)	Mandar 42'; Coro 53'; Narayan (yellow card) 59'; Bedia (yellow card) 77'	Report	Marcinho 45' (yellow card) 75'; John 71'	Stadium: Fatorda Stadium; Attendance: 16,617; Referee: Rowana; Man of the Match: Coro (Goa)

7 February 2018 13	NorthEast United	0–1	Pune City	Guwahati
20:00 IST (UTC+5:30)		Report	Rafa (yellow card) 78'; Marcelinho 86'	Stadium: Indira Gandhi Athletic Stadium; Attendance: 3,532; Man of the Match: Marcelinho (Pune City)

10 February 2018 14	Jamshedpur	1–0	NorthEast United	Jamshedpur
20:00 IST (UTC+5:30)	Priori 51'	Report	Didika (yellow card) 12'; Len (yellow card) 30'	Stadium: JRD Tata Sports Complex; Attendance: 23,953; Man of the Match: Wellington Priori (Jamshedpur)

14 February 2018 15	NorthEast United	0–1	Delhi Dynamos	Guwahati
20:00 IST (UTC+5:30)		Report	Kalu Uche 87'	Stadium: Indira Gandhi Athletic Stadium; Attendance: 4,663; Man of the Match: Kalu Uche (Delhi Dynamos)

17 February 2018 16	NorthEast United	0–1	Kerala Blasters	Guwahati
20:00 IST (UTC+5:30)	Diaz (yellow card) 31'; Chettri (yellow card) 42'; Didika (yellow card) 59'; Mosquera (yellow card) 90'	Report	Brown 28'; Sandesh Jhingan (yellow card) 90'	Stadium: Indira Gandhi Athletic Stadium; Attendance: 1,121; Man of the Match: Wes Brown (Kerala Blasters)

22 February 2018 17	Mumbai City	3–2	NorthEast United	Mumbai
20:00 IST (UTC+5:30)	Emana 15'; Goian (yellow card) 35' (goal) 90'; Santos 54'	Report	Gill 24' (yellow card) 28'; Sambinha 43'; Reagan (yellow card) 84'; Borges (yellow card) 89'; Len (yellow card) 90'	Stadium: Mumbai Football Arena; Attendance: 4,222; Man of the Match: Éverton Santos (Mumbai City))

4 March 2018 18	Atlético de Kolkata	1–0	NorthEast United	Kolkata
20:00 IST (UTC+5:30)	Keane 10'; Montel (yellow card) 71'; Soram (yellow card) 90'	Report	Chettri (yellow card) 90'	Stadium: Salt Lake Stadium; Attendance: 3,165; Referee: Matthew Cogner; Man of the Match: Robbie Keane (atk)

== Indian Super Cup ==
Announced on 15 March 2018, 2018 Indian Super Cup is a replacement for the Federation Cup. The qualifiers for the inaugural tournament are to begin on 15 March and conclude on 31 March 2018. The tournament proper will then commence on 5 April and conclude with the final on 25 April 2018.

NorthEast, having finished the 2017–18 ISL at the bottom spot, had to play the qualifiers to enter the competition. They played their qualifier match against Gokulam Kerala on 15 Match 2018 at the Kalinga Stadium in Bhubaneswar which they lost 0-2.

=== Foreign Players ===
Indian Super Cup, unlike Indian Super League, allows only 6 foreign players in squad for the tournament. Out of the 6 players 5 can be fielded by the teams.

As of 14 March 2018

No.	Position	Nationality	Player
3	DF	(Guinea-Bissau)	Sambinha
5	DF	(Portugal)	José Gonçalves
6	MF	(Sweden)	Maic Sema
10	MF	(Brazil)	Marcinho
21	DF	(Uruguay)	Martín Díaz
99	FW	(Brazil)	Danilo

=== Qualifiers ===
15 March 2018 Q1	NorthEast United	0-2	Gokulam Kerala	Bhubaneswar
20:00 IST (UTC+5:30)		Report	Henry Kisekka 43', 74'	Stadium: Kalinga Stadium; Attendance: 1,500; Referee: Tejas Nagvenkar; Man of the Match: Nikhil Bernard (Gokulam)

== Management ==
Updated 12 January 2018.

Position	Name
Head coach	(Israel) Avram Grant
Assistant coach	(Netherlands) Eelco Schattorie
Goalkeeping coach	(India) Joseph Sidy
Strength and conditioning coach	(Portugal) Mauro André Claro Martins
Physiotherapist	(India) Arvind Yadav

== Squad statistics ==
As of 15 March 2018

=== Appearances and goals ===
No.	Pos	Nat	Player	Total		Indian Super League		Indian Super Cup	
No.	Pos	Nat	Player	Apps	Goals	Apps	Goals	Apps	Goals
1	GK	(India) IND	Ravi Kumar	2	0	1+1	0	0	0
3	DF	(Guinea-Bissau) GBS	Sambinha	15	1	14	1	1	0
4	DF	(India) IND	Nirmal Chettri	17	0	16	0	1	0
5	DF	(Portugal) POR	José Gonçalves	17	0	16	0	1	0
6	MF	(Sweden) SWE	Maic Sema	8	0	5+2	0	0+1	0
9	FW	(India) IND	Seminlen Doungel	16	4	13+2	4	0+1	0
10	MF	(Brazil) BRA	Marcinho	17	4	15+1	4	1	0
11	FW	(India) IND	Halicharan Narzary	14	0	10+3	0	1	0
12	DF	(India) IND	Reagan Singh	16	0	14+1	0	0+1	0
13	GK	(India) IND	Rehenesh TP	18	0	17	0	1	0
14	FW	(India) IND	Rowllin Borges	17	0	16	0	1	0
15	DF	(India) IND	Abdul Hakku	4	0	3+1	0	0	0
16	DF	(India) IND	Robert Lalthlamuana	10	0	6+3	0	1	0
17	MF	(India) IND	Sushil Meitei	1	0	0+1	0	0	0
18	MF	(India) IND	Malemngamba Meitei	7	0	4+3	0	0	0
20	MF	(India) IND	Lalrindika Ralte	13	0	7+5	0	1	0
21	DF	(Uruguay) URU	Martín Díaz	17	0	14+3	0	0	0
23	MF	(Portugal) POR	Helio Pinto	3	0	1+2	0	0	0
27	FW	(Colombia) COL	John Mosquera	8	1	2+6	1	0	0
33	DF	(India) IND	Gursimrat Singh Gill	5	1	2+3	1	0	0
45	MF	(India) IND	Fanai Lalrempuia	4	0	2+1	0	1	0
99	FW	(Brazil) BRA	Danilo	19	1	13+5	1	1	0
Players who left NorthEast United during the season:
8	MF	(Brazil) BRA	Adilson Goiano	4	0	4	0	0	0
7	FW	(Cape Verde) CPV	Odaïr Fortes	4	0	2+2	0	0	0
19	FW	(Colombia) COL	Luis Páez	6	0	1+5	0	0	0

=== Goal scorers ===
Place	Position	Nation	Number	Name	Indian Super League	Indian Super Cup	Total
1	FW	(India)	9	Seminlen Doungel	4	0	4
1	MF	(Brazil)	10	Marcinho	4	0	4
3	FW	(Brazil)	99	Danilo	1	0	1
3	FW	(Colombia)	27	John Mosquera	1	0	1
3	DF	(Guinea-Bissau)	3	Sambinha	1	0	1
3	DF	(India)	33	Gursimrat Singh Gill	1	0	1
				TOTALS	12	0	12

=== Disciplinary record ===
Number	Nation	Position	Name	Indian Super League		Total	
Number	Nation	Position	Name	Yellow card	Red card	Yellow card	Red card
3	(Guinea-Bissau)	DF	Sambinha	1	0	1	0
4	(India)	DF	Nirmal Chettri	6	0	6	0
5	(Portugal)	DF	José Gonçalves	1	0	1	0
8	(Brazil)	MF	Adilson	1	0	1	0
9	(India)	FW	Seiminlen Doungel	4	0	4	0
10	(Brazil)	MF	Marcinho	2	0	2	0
12	(India)	DF	Reagan Singh	2	0	2	0
13	(India)	GK	Rehenesh TP	1	1	1	1
14	(India)	MF	Rowllin Borges	2	0	2	0
16	(India)	DF	Robert Lalthlamuana	1	0	1	0
19	(Colombia)	FW	Luis Páez	2	0	2	0
20	(India)	MF	Lalrindika Ralte	2	0	2	0
21	(Uruguay)	DF	Martín Díaz	2	0	2	0
33	(India)	DF	Gursimrat Singh Gill	1	0	1	0
27	(Colombia)	DF	John Mosquera	1	0	1	0
99	(Brazil)	FW	Danilo	2	0	2	0
			TOTALS	25	1	25	1
