= 2015 ISL Domestic Draft =

ISL Domestic Draft
- Date: 10 July 2015
- Location: Mumbai

The 2015 ISL domestic draft was the second domestic draft from the Indian Super League, the new domestic football league in India. The draft featured 114 players, of which only 40 were picked. The draft took place in Mumbai on 10 July 2015.

== Players available for the draft ==
Were in ISL last season
Player	ISL Team	Position	Age
Prabir Das	Goa	DF	21
Alwyn George	Goa	MF	23
Avinabo Bag	Kerala Blasters	DF	25
Ashutosh Mehta	Pune City	MF	24
Lalit Thapa	Pune City	GK	30
Munmun Lugun	Delhi Dynamos	DF	22
Luis Barreto	Kerala Blasters	GK	34
Cavin Lobo	Atlético de Kolkata	MF	27
Mohammed Rafique	Atlético de Kolkata	FW	22
Peter Carvalho	Goa	DF	34
Kunzang Bhutia	NorthEast United	GK	21
Manish Bhargav	Delhi Dynamos	MF	21
Shouvik Ghosh	Delhi Dynamos	DF	22
Shilton Paul	Chennaiyin	GK	26
Zodingliana Ralte	NorthEast United	DF	19
Deepak Devrani	Pune City	DF	22
Jaison Vales	Chennaiyin	MF	26
Tapan Maity	Pune City	MF	30
Manandeep Singh	Delhi Dynamos	FW	22
Asif Kottayil	Mumbai City	MF	30
Steven Dias	Delhi Dynamos	MF	31
Govin Singh	Delhi Dynamos	DF	27
Biswajit Saha	Atlético de Kolkata	DF	27
Anupam Sarkar	Pune City	DF	30
Naoba Singh	Delhi Dynamos	DF	27
Durga Boro	NorthEast United	FW	27
Rakesh Masih	Atlético de Kolkata	MF	28
Pratik Shinde	Pune City	MF	20
Milagres Gonsalves	Kerala Blasters	FW	28
Sushanth Mathew	Kerala Blasters	MF	34

Non-ISL players
Player	Last I-League team	Position	Age
Beikhokhei Beingaichho	Bengaluru FC	MF	24
C.K. Vineeth	Bengaluru FC	MF	26
Keegan Pereira	Bengaluru FC	DF	27
Lalthuammawia Ralte	Bengaluru FC	GK	22
Shankar Sampingiraj	Bengaluru FC	MF	20
Shilton D'Silva	Bengaluru FC	MF	22
Siam Hanghal	Bengaluru FC	MF	21
Soram Anganba	Bengaluru FC	GK	22
Malemngamba Meetei	Bengaluru FC	MF	23
Gunashekar Vignesh	Bharat FC	MF	26
Chinta Chandrashekar Rao	Sporting Goa	MF	26
Justin Stephen	Mumbai	DF	27
Fulganco Cardozo	Dempo	DF	27
Uttam Rai	Dempo	FW	19
Germanpreet Singh	Dempo	MF	18
Rahul Bheke	Mumbai	DF	24
Abhinas Ruidas	East Bengal	MF	22
Lalkamal Bhowmick	Mohun Bagan	MF	29
Sehnaj Singh	Mohun Bagan	MF	21
Collin Abranches	Mumbai	MF	23
Nidhin Lal	Mumbai	GK	24
Reisangmei Vashum	Mumbai	MF	27
Sampath Kuttymani	Mumbai	MF	28
Amrinder Singh	Pune	GK	21
Dhanpal Ganesh	Pune	MF	20
Fanai Lalrempuia	Pune	MF	19
Lalram Luaha	Pune	MF	24
Matthew Gonsalves	Pune	DF	26
Nikhil Kadam	Pune	MF	21
Yumnam Raju	Pune	DF	26
Salam Ranjan Singh	Pune	DF	19
Velington Rocha	Pune	MF	23
Zohmingliana Ralte	Pune	DF	27
Thongkhosiem Haokip	Pune	FW	21
C Lallawmzuala	Royal Wahingdoh	DF	24
Lalchhawnkima	Royal Wahingdoh	DF	23
Lalhmangaihsanga	Royal Wahingdoh	DF	26
Marlangki Suting	Royal Wahingdoh	DF	28
Nikhil Bernard	Royal Wahingdoh	GK	25
Reagan Singh	Royal Wahingdoh	DF	23
Albino Gomes	Free Agent	GK	21
Aslon Oliveira	Salgaocar	FW	21
Augustin Fernandes	Salgaocar	DF	27
Abhra Mondal	East Bengal	GK	28
Prohlad Roy	East Bengal	MF	22
Bikash Jairu	Salgaocar	MF	27
Brian Mascarenhas	Salgaocar	MF	23
Gilbert Oliveira	Salgaocar	MF	24
Karma Tsewang	Salgaocar	MF	26
Nicolau Colaco	Salgaocar	DF	30
Thangjam Singh	Salgaocar	MF	28
Zakeer Mundampara	Salgaocar	MF	24
Joseph Lalfakzuala	Shillong Lajong	MF	19
Beevan D'Mello	Sporting Goa	MF	28
Cajetan Fernandes	Sporting Goa	MF	26
Keenan Almeida	Sporting Goa	DF	23
Pratesh Shirodkar	Sporting Goa	MF	26
Ravi Kumar	Sporting Goa	GK	21
Rowllin Borges	Sporting Goa	MF	22
Sumit Passi	Sporting Goa	FW	19
Velito Cruz	Sporting Goa	MF	24
Victorino Fernandes	Sporting Goa	FW	26
Bishorjit Singh	Royal Wahingdoh	GK	23
Prem Kumar Singh	Royal Wahingdoh	GK	20
Ngouba Singh	Royal Wahingdoh	DF	20
Laldinmawia	Royal Wahingdoh	MF	23
Loken Meitei	Royal Wahingdoh	MF	18
Sushil Meitei	Royal Wahingdoh	MF	18
Pradeep Mohanraj	Mumbai	MF	24
Samuel Shadap	Shillong Lajong	DF	22
Nim Dorjee Tamang	Shillong Lajong	DF	19
Aayushmaan Chaturvedi	Mohun Bagan	MF	20
Brandon Fernandes	Sporting Goa	MF	20
Jessel Carneiro	Pune	DF	24
Bineesh Balan	Pune	FW	26
Tirthankar Sarkar	Mohun Bagan	MF	21
Pankaj Moula	Mohun Bagan	MF	22
Debjit Majumder	Mohun Bagan	GK	27
Sukhen Dey	Mohun Bagan	DF	25
Satish Singh	Mohun Bagan	DF	21
Samir Subash Naik	Dempo	DF	35
Gurjinder Kumar	Pune	DF	24
Lalchhuan Mawia	Bengaluru FC	DF	25

== Player selection ==
=== Round 1 ===
Pick #	ISL team	Player	Position
1	Atlético de Kolkata	Amrinder Singh	Goalkeeper
2	Chennaiyin	Dhanpal Ganesh	Midfielder
3	Pune City	Bikash Jairu	Forward
4	Kerala Blasters	Cavin Lobo	Midfielder
5	NorthEast United	Lalthuammawia Ralte	Goalkeeper
6	Mumbai City	Brandon Fernandes (Note: FC Goa attempted to instant trade with Mumbai City for Fernandes. Mumbai City rejected.)	Midfielder
7	Delhi Dynamos	Naoba Singh	Defender
8	Goa	Victorino Fernandes	Midfielder

=== Round 2 ===
Pick #	ISL team	Player	Position
1	Goa	Thongkhosiem Haokip (Note: NorthEast United attempted to instant trade with FC Goa for Haokip. FC Goa rejected.)	Forward
2	Delhi Dynamos	Sehnaj Singh	Midfielder
3	Mumbai City	Lalchhuan Mawia (Note: NorthEast United attempted to instant trade with Mumbai City for Mawia. Mumbai City rejected.)	Defender
4	NorthEast United	Siam Hanghal	Midfielder
5	Kerala Blasters	Shankar Sampingiraj	Midfielder
6	Pune City	Gurjinder Kumar (Note: Atlético de Kolkata attempted to instant trade with Pune City for Fernandes. Pune City rejected.)	Defender
7	Chennaiyin	Zakeer Mundampara	Midfielder
8	Atlético de Kolkata	Augustin Fernandes	Defender

=== Round 3 ===
Pick #	ISL team	Player	Position
1	Pune City	Sushanth Mathew	Midfielder
2	Kerala Blasters	C.K. Vineeth	Midfielder
3	NorthEast United	Reagan Singh (Note: Delhi Dynamos attempted to instant trade with NorthEast United for Singh. NorthEast United rejected.)	Defender
4	Mumbai City	Debjit Majumder	Goalkeeper
5	Delhi Dynamos	Ravi Kumar	Goalkeeper
6	Atlético de Kolkata	Lalchhawnkima	Defender
7	Chennaiyin	Lalhmangaihsanga	Defender

=== Round 4 ===
Pick #	ISL team	Player	Position
1	Chennaiyin	Justin Stephen	Defender
2	Atlético de Kolkata	Kunzang Bhutia	Goalkeeper
3	Delhi Dynamos	Prabir Das	Defender
4	Mumbai City	Ashutosh Mehta	Defender
5	NorthEast United	Yumnam Raju	Defender
6	Kerala Blasters	Peter Carvalho	Midfielder
7	Pune City	Lalit Thapa	Goalkeeper

==== Round 4 trades ====
None

=== Round 5 ===
Pick #	ISL team	Player	Position
1	Pune City	Govin Singh	Defender
2	Chennaiyin	Nidhin Lal	Goalkeeper
3	Pune City	Fanai Lalrempuia (Note: Pune City attempted to instant trade with Delhi Dynamos for Singh. Delhi Dynamos agreed for 9.2 lakhs.)	Midfielder
4	Mumbai City	Keegan Pereira	Defender
5	NorthEast United	Marlangki Suting	Defender

=== Round 6 ===
Pick #	ISL team	Player	Position
1	NorthEast United	Zohmingliana Ralte	Defender
2	Mumbai City	Pratesh Shirodkar	Midfielder
3	Delhi Dynamos	Zodingliana Ralte	Midfielder
4	Delhi Dynamos	Gunashekar Vignesh (Note: Delhi Dynamos got this spot in the draft from the trade with Pune City in Round 5.)	Midfielder

=== Round 7 ===
Pick #	ISL team	Player	Position
1	Mumbai City	Albino Gomes	Goalkeeper

==== Round 7 trades ====
None
