= 2017–18 ISL Players Draft =

ISL Players Draft
- Date: 23 July 2017
- Location: St. Regis, Mumbai

The 2017–18 ISL Players Draft was a players draft conducted by the Indian Super League on 23 July 2017.

== Format ==
Regulations for the 2017–18 Indian Super League allow for each club to have a minimum of 15 Indian players and a maximum of 18, which include two mandatory under-21 players. Prior to the draft, each club was allowed to retain a maximum of two senior players from the previous season (2016–17 I-League for Bengaluru FC) as well as retaining up to three under-21 players.

The draft had a total of 15 rounds. New expansion side, Jamshedpur FC, had the first pick in both the first and second rounds. Them and Delhi Dynamos, who didn't retain a single player from the previous season, were the only sides who participate in the first round of the draft. The order for which each team participated in the draft was determined on Saturday, 22 July 2017. Clubs also had the option to use an "Instant Trading Card" during the draft which allowed them to trade a picked player to another club.

== Players available ==
On 22 July 2017, before the draft commenced, the official list of players available for selection were announced. The players listed were:

#	Player	Position
1	Dhanachandra Singh	DF
2	Jayesh Rane	FW
3	Mehrajuddin Wadoo	DF
4	Baljit Sahni	MF
5	Nallappan Mohanraj	DF
6	Zakeer Mundampara	MF
7	Pritam Kotal	DF
8	Lalrindika Ralte	MF
9	Bikash Jairu	MF
10	Boithang Haokip	MF
11	Arindam Bhattacharya	GK
12	Gouramangi Singh	DF
13	Lenny Rodrigues	MF
14	Yumnam Raju	DF
15	Augustin Fernandes	DF
16	Arata Izumi	MF
17	Rahul Bheke	DF
18	Sanju Pradhan	MF
19	Narayan Das	DF
20	Francis Fernandes	MF
21	Holicharan Narzary	FW
22	Robin Gurung	DF
23	Nirmal Chettri	DF
24	Sumeet Passi	FW
25	Subrata Pal	GK
26	Keenan Almeida	DF
27	Romeo Fernandes	FW
28	Pratesh Shirodkar	MF
29	Denzil Franco	DF
30	Fulganco Cardozo	DF
31	Mehtab Hossain	MF
32	Thongkhosiem Haokip	FW
33	Mohammed Rafi	FW
34	Adil Khan	MF
35	Albino Gomes	GK
36	Anthony D'Souza	MF
37	Beevan D'Mello	MF
38	Mohamed Ali	DF
39	Subhasish Bose	DF
40	Gurjinder Kumar	DF
41	Debabrata Roy	DF
42	Sanjiban Ghosh	GK
43	Subhasish Roy Chowdhury	GK
44	Sandip Nandy	GK
45	Nadong Bhutia	FW
46	Godwin Franco	MF
47	Anupam Sarkar	DF
48	Denson Devadas	MF
49	Jackichand Singh	MF
50	Thoi Singh	MF

#	Player	Position
51	Harmanjot Khabra	MF
52	Seityasen Singh	MF
53	Kean Lewis	FW
54	Siam Hanghal	MF
55	Jewel Raja	MF
56	Vinit Rai	MF
57	Germanpreet Singh	MF
58	Uttam Rai	FW
59	Fanai Lalrempuia	MF
60	Israil Gurung	MF
61	Denechandra Meitei	DF
62	Durga Boro	FW
63	Shankar Sampingiraj	MF
64	Keegan Pereira	DF
65	Balwant Singh	FW
66	Ashutosh Mehta	DF
67	Anwar Ali	DF
68	Rakesh Masih	DF
69	Gursimrat Singh Gill	DF
70	Alwyn George	MF
71	Pratik Chowdhary	DF
72	Kunal Sawant	GK
73	Dhruvmil Vipul Pandya	FW
74	Mohammad Sajid Dhot	DF
75	Robin Singh	FW
76	Hitesh Sharma	MF
77	Amey Ranawade	DF
78	Beikhokhei Beingaichho	FW
79	Arashpreet Singh	DF
80	Karan Sawhney	FW
81	Subodh Kumar	MF
82	Dashyanng Kachru	MF
83	Ubaid Chono Kadavath	GK
84	Harpeet Singh	DF
85	Simranjit Singh	MF
86	Imran Khan	GK
87	Sukhwinder Singh	DF
88	Gurpreet Singh	GK
89	Samuel Shadap	DF
90	Abhishek Das	DF
91	Kunzang Bhutia	GK
92	Abhra Mondal	GK
93	Avilash Paul	GK
94	Syed Rahim Nabi	DF
95	N.S. Manju	DF
96	Rowilson Rodrigues	DF
97	Calvin Abhishek	GK
98	Umesh Perambra	DF
99	Akshay Joshy	MF
100	Shahinlal Meloly	GK

#	Player	Position
101	Shouvik Ghosh	DF
102	Sena Ralte	DF
103	Seminlen Doungel	FW
104	Lalthuammawia Ralte	GK
105	Lalchhuanmawia	DF
106	Lalchhawnkima	DF
107	Reagan Singh	DF
108	Loken Meitei	MF
109	Lalruatthara	DF
110	Zohmingliana Ralte	DF
111	Abdul Hakku	DF
112	Pranjal Bhumij	FW
113	Sushil Meitei	MF
114	Gurtej Singh	DF
115	Malemngamba Meetei	MF
116	Ashim Biswas	FW
117	Ronald Singh	MF
118	Robert Lalthlamuana	DF
119	Shylo Malsawmtluanga	MF
120	Lalthakima	DF
121	Priyant Singh	GK
122	Pawan Kumar	DF
123	Jony Routh	DF
124	Shilton D'Silva	MF
125	Nikhil Kadam	MF
126	Justin Stephen	DF
127	Sukhdev Patil	GK
128	Pawan Kumar	GK
129	Arnab Das Sharma	GK
130	Wayne Vaz	DF
131	Deepak Devrani	DF
132	Raju Gaikwad	DF
133	Bikramjit Singh	MF
134	Sanjay Balmuchu	DF
135	Sahil Tavora	MF
136	Nidhin Lal	GK
137	Mohammad Ansari	GK
138	Sumit Das	GK
139	Munmun Lugun	DF
140	Clyde Fernandes	DF
141	Srikanth Ramu	DF
142	Collin Abranches	DF
143	Saumik Dey	DF
144	Darren Caldeira	MF
145	Pronay Halder	MF
146	Souvik Chakrabarti	MF
147	Naoba Singh	DF
148	Jaison Vales	MF
149	Dharmaraj Ravanan	DF
150	Abhishek Das	GK

#	Player	Position
151	Milan Singh	MF
152	Aiborlang Khongjee	DF
153	Amoes Do	MF
154	Atinder Mani	DF
155	Eugeneson Lyngdoh	MF
156	Souvik Das	MF
157	Naveen Kumar	GK
158	Dhanpal Ganesh	MF
159	Seriton Fernandes	MF
160	Joyner Lourenco	DF
161	Bruno Colaço	GK
162	Neel Shah	MF
163	Kamaljit Singh	GK
164	Siddharth Singh	FW
165	Ishan Debnath	GK
166	Biswajit Saha	DF
167	Farukh Choudhary	FW
168	Abhishek Rawat	MF
169	David Ngaihte	FW
170	Manish Maithani	MF
171	Indrajeet Dinkar Chougule	MF
172	Arup Debnath	GK
173	Brandon Fernandes	FW
174	Ajay Singh	MF
175	Anas Edathodika	DF
176	Harshad Meher	GK
177	Surchandra Singh	DF
178	Ajith Sivan	MF
179	Davinder Singh	DF
180	Abhinas Ruidas	MF
181	Rana Gharami	DF
182	Ravi Kumar	GK
183	Alber Gonsalves	MF
184	Jovel Martins	DF
185	Chinglensana Singh	DF
186	Manandeep Singh	FW
187	Pritam Kumar Singh	DF
188	Rino Anto	DF
189	Lallianzuala Chhangte	FW
190	Jerry Mawihmingthanga	FW
191	Rohit Kumar	MF
192	Bipin Singh	MF
193	Rupert Nongrum	MF
194	Isaac Vanmalsawma	MF
195	Nim Dorjee Tamang	DF
196	Mobin Rai	DF
197	Amit Tudu	DF
198	Nijwm Muchahary	FW
199	Surya Tirkey	DF
200	Mohammed Yasir	MF

#	Player	Position
201	Kyntiewshaphrang Kharlukhi	MF
202	Sairuat Kima	DF
203	Alen Deory	MF
204	Syed Shoaib Ahmed	FW
205	Mohammed Saukat	DF

== Player selection ==
=== Round 1 ===
Only Jamshedpur FC and Delhi Dynamos entered the draft in this round.

Pick #	ISL team	Player	Position
1	Jamshedpur FC	Anas Edathodika	Defender
2	Delhi Dynamos	Albino Gomes	Goalkeeper

=== Round 2 ===
Only Pune City entered the draft in this round.

Pick #	ISL team	Player	Position
1	Jamshedpur FC	Subrata Pal	Goalkeeper
2	Pune City	Adil Khan	Midfielder
3	Delhi Dynamos	Pritam Kotal	Defender

=== Round 3 ===
Atlético de Kolkata, Bengaluru FC, Goa, Kerala Blasters, Mumbai City, and NorthEast United all entered in this round.

Pick #	ISL team	Player	Position
1	Pune City	Kean Lewis (Note: Atlético de Kolkata attempted to instant trade with Pune City for Lewis. Pune City rejected.)	Forward
2	Goa	Narayan Das	Defender
3	NorthEast United	Halicharan Narzary	Forward
4	Mumbai City	Balwant Singh	Forward
5	Bengaluru FC	Lalthuammawia Ralte (Note: Pune City attempted to instant trade with Bengaluru FC for Ralte. Bengaluru FC rejected.)	Goalkeeper
6	Delhi Dynamos	Lallianzuala Chhangte	Forward
7	Atlético de Kolkata	Eugeneson Lyngdoh (Note: Kerala Blasters attempted to instant trade with Atlético de Kolkata for Lyngdoh. Atlético de Kolkata rejected.)	Midfielder
8	Jamshedpur FC	Mehtab Hossain	Midfielder
9	Kerala Blasters	Rino Anto	Defender

=== Round 4 ===
Chennaiyin entered in this round.

Pick #	ISL team	Player	Position
1	Kerala Blasters	Lalruatthara (Note: Pune City attempted to instant trade with Kerala Blasters for Lalruatthara. Kerala Blasters rejected.)	Defender
2	Jamshedpur FC	Souvik Chakrabarti	Midfielder
3	Atlético de Kolkata	Jayesh Rane (Note: Chennaiyin attempted to instant trade with Atlético de Kolkata for Rane. Atlético de Kolkata rejected.)	Forward
4	Delhi Dynamos	Sena Ralte (Note: NorthEast United attempted to instant trade with Delhi Dynamos for Ralte. Delhi Dynamos rejected.)	Defender
5	Bengaluru FC	Rahul Bheke (Note: Goa attempted to instant trade with Bengaluru FC for Bheke. Bengaluru FC rejected.)	Defender
6	Mumbai City	Arindam Bhattacharya	Goalkeeper
7	NorthEast United	Nirmal Chettri	Defender
8	Goa	Pronay Halder	Midfielder
9	Pune City	Lalchhuanmawia	Defender
10	Chennaiyin	Thoi Singh	Midfielder

=== Round 5 ===
Pick #	ISL team	Player	Position
1	Goa	Chinglensana Singh	Defender
2	NorthEast United	Lalrindika Ralte	Midfielder
3	Mumbai City	Raju Gaikwad	Defender
4	Bengaluru FC	Harmanjot Khabra (Note: Chennaiyin attempted to instant trade with Bengaluru FC for Khabra. Bengaluru FC rejected.)	Midfielder
5	Delhi Dynamos	Seityasen Singh	Midfielder
6	Atlético de Kolkata	Keegan Pereira	Defender
7	Jamshedpur FC	Robin Gurung (Note: NorthEast United attempted to instant trade with Jamshedpur FC for Gurung. Jamshedpur FC rejected.)	Defender
8	Kerala Blasters	Milan Singh	Midfielder
9	Chennaiyin	Bikramjit Singh	Midfielder
10	Pune City	Jewel Raja	Midfielder

=== Round 6 ===
Pick #	ISL team	Player	Position
1	Pune City	Nim Dorjee Tamang	Defender
2	Chennaiyin	Dhanachandra Singh	Defender
3	Kerala Blasters	Arata Izumi	Midfielder
4	Jamshedpur FC	Bikash Jairu	Midfielder
5	Atlético de Kolkata	Shankar Sampingiraj	Midfielder
6	Delhi Dynamos	Pratik Chowdhary	Defender
7	Bengaluru FC	Subhasish Bose	Defender
8	Mumbai City	Abhinas Ruidas	Midfielder
9	NorthEast United	Robert Lalthlamuana	Defender
10	Goa	Brandon Fernandes	Midfielder

=== Round 7 ===
Pick #	ISL team	Player	Position
1	Mumbai City	Sahil Tavora	Midfielder
2	NorthEast United	Seminlen Doungel	Forward
3	Goa	Seriton Fernandes	Midfielder
4	Pune City	Isaac Vanmalsawma	Midfielder
5	Chennaiyin	Germanpreet Singh	Midfielder
6	Kerala Blasters	Subhasish Roy Chowdhury	Goalkeeper
7	Jamshedpur FC	Jerry Mawihmingthanga	Midfielder
8	Atlético de Kolkata	Anwar Ali	Defender
9	Delhi Dynamos	Vinit Rai	Midfielder
10	Bengaluru FC	Alwyn George	Midfielder

=== Round 8 ===
Pick #	ISL team	Player	Position
1	Bengaluru FC	Lenny Rodrigues	Midfielder
2	Delhi Dynamos	Romeo Fernandes	Midfielder
3	Atlético de Kolkata	Hitesh Sharma	Midfielder
4	Jamshedpur FC	Shouvik Ghosh	Defender
5	Kerala Blasters	Jackichand Singh	Midfielder
6	Chennaiyin	Fulganco Cardozo	Defender
7	Pune City	Harpreet Singh	Defender
8	Goa	Pratesh Shirodkar	Midfielder
9	NorthEast United	Reagan Singh	Defender
10	Mumbai City	Aiborlang Khongjee	Defender

=== Round 9 ===
Pick #	ISL team	Player	Position
1	Chennaiyin	Pawan Kumar	Goalkeeper
2	Pune City	Wayne Vaz	Defender
3	Goa	Naveen Kumar	Goalkeeper
4	NorthEast United	Ravi Kumar	Goalkeeper
5	Mumbai City	Sanju Pradhan	Midfielder
6	Bengaluru FC	Zohmingliana Ralte	Defender
7	Delhi Dynamos	David Ngaihte	Midfielder
8	Atlético de Kolkata	Robin Singh	Forward
9	Jamshedpur FC	Sairuat Kima	Defender
10	Kerala Blasters	Siam Hanghal	Midfielder

=== Round 10 ===
Pick #	ISL team	Player	Position
1	Kerala Blasters	Lalthakima	Defender
2	Jamshedpur FC	Sanjiban Ghosh	Goalkeeper
3	Atlético de Kolkata	Rupert Nongrum	Midfielder
4	Delhi Dynamos	Sukhdev Patil	Goalkeeper
5	Bengaluru FC	Thongkhosiem Haokip	Forward
6	Mumbai City	Zakeer Mundampara	Midfielder
7	NorthEast United	Gursimrat Singh Gill	Defender
8	Goa	Mohamed Ali	Defender
9	Pune City	Kamaljit Singh	Goalkeeper
10	Chennaiyin	Keenan Almeida	Defender

=== Round 11 ===
Pick #	ISL team	Player	Position
1	Goa	Jovel Martins	Midfielder
2	NorthEast United	Malemngamba Meetei	Midfielder
3	Mumbai City	Biswajit Saha	Defender
4	Bengaluru FC	Abhra Mondal	Goalkeeper
5	Delhi Dynamos	Mohammad Sajid Dhot	Defender
6	Atlético de Kolkata	Ashutosh Mehta	Defender
7	Jamshedpur FC	Farukh Choudhary	Forward
8	Kerala Blasters	Pritam Kumar Singh	Defender
9	Chennaiyin	Mohammed Rafi	Forward
10	Pune City	Baljit Sahni	Forward

=== Round 12 ===
Pick #	ISL team	Player	Position
1	Pune City	Rohit Kumar	Midfielder
2	Chennaiyin	Dhanpal Ganesh	Midfielder
3	Kerala Blasters	Samuel Shadap	Defender
4	Jamshedpur FC	Sumeet Passi	Forward
5	Atlético de Kolkata	Augustin Fernandes	Defender
6	Delhi Dynamos	Rowilson Rodrigues	Defender
7	Bengaluru FC	Boithang Haokip	Midfielder
8	Mumbai City	Pranjal Bhumij	Forward
9	NorthEast United	Abdul Hakku	Defender
10	Goa	Amey Ranawade	Defender

=== Round 13 ===
Pick #	ISL team	Player	Position
1	Mumbai City	Mehrajuddin Wadoo	Defender
2	NorthEast United	Fanai Lalrempuia	Midfielder
3	Goa	Anthony D'Souza	Midfielder
4	Pune City	Ajay Singh	Midfielder
5	Chennaiyin	Sanjay Balmuchu	Midfielder
6	Kerala Blasters	Loken Meitei	Midfielder
7	Jamshedpur FC	Yumnam Raju	Defender
8	Atlético de Kolkata	Ronald Singh	Forward
9	Delhi Dynamos	Munmun Lugun	Defender
10	Bengaluru FC	Collin Abranches	Defender

=== Round 14 ===
Pick #	ISL team	Player	Position
1	Bengaluru FC	Joyner Lourenco	Defender
2	Delhi Dynamos	Arnab Das Sharma	Goalkeeper
3	Atlético de Kolkata	Kunzang Bhutia	Goalkeeper
4	Jamshedpur FC	Ashim Biswas	Forward
5	Kerala Blasters	Karan Sawhney	Forward
6	Chennaiyin	Francis Fernandes	Midfielder
7	Pune City	Gurtej Singh	Defender
8	Goa	Mohammed Yasir	Defender
9	NorthEast United	Gurpreet Singh	Goalkeeper
10	Mumbai City	Kunal Sawant	Goalkeeper

=== Round 15 ===
Pick #	ISL team	Player	Position
1	Chennaiyin	Shahinlal Meloly	Goalkeeper
2	Pune City	Pawan Kumar	Defender
3	Goa	Bruno Colaço	Goalkeeper
4	NorthEast United	Sushil Meitei	Midfielder
5	Mumbai City	Lalchhawnkima	Defender
6	Bengaluru FC	Calvin Abhishek	Goalkeeper
7	Delhi Dynamos	Simranjit Singh	Midfielder
8	Atlético de Kolkata	Bipin Singh	Forward
9	Jamshedpur FC	Siddharth Singh	Forward
10	Kerala Blasters	Ajith Sivan	Midfielder

== See also ==
- List of 2017–18 Indian Super League season roster changes
