= List of 2017–18 Indian Super League season roster changes =

2017–18 Indian Super League season roster changes
- Season: 2017–18 Indian Super League

This is a list of all roster changes that occurred prior to the 2017–18 Indian Super League.

== Retained players ==
Due to the league expanding with two new teams, each Indian Super League club is allowed to retain a maximum of two Indian players over the age of twenty-one (21).

=== Atlético de Kolkata ===
Position	Player
GK	(India) Debjit Majumder
DF	(India) Prabir Das

=== Bengaluru FC ===
Position	Player
DF	(England) John Johnson
DF	(Spain) Juanan
DF	(India) Nishu Kumar
MF	(India) Malsawmzuala
FW	(India) Sunil Chhetri
FW	(India) Udanta Singh

=== Chennaiyin FC ===
Position	Player
GK	(India) Karanjit Singh
DF	(India) Jerry Lalrinzuala
MF	(Brazil) Raphael Augusto
MF	(India) Anirudh Thapa
FW	(India) Jeje Lalpekhlua

=== Delhi Dynamos ===
On 7 July 2017, the Delhi Dynamos stated that they would not retain any of their domestic players from the previous season.

=== FC Goa ===
Position	Player
GK	(India) Laxmikant Kattimani
MF	(India) Mandar Rao Desai

=== Kerala Blasters FC ===
Position	
DF	(India) Sandesh Jhingan
FW	(India) C.K. Vineeth
FW	(India) Prasanth Karuthadathkuni

=== Mumbai City FC ===
Position	Player
GK	(India) Amrinder Singh
MF	(India) Rakesh Oram
MF	(India) Sehnaj Singh

=== Northeast United FC ===
Position	Player
GK	(India) Rehenesh TP
MF	(India) Rowllin Borges

=== Pune City ===
Position	Player
GK	(India) Vishal Kaith
FW	(India) Ashique Kuruniyan

== Player movement and other transactions ==
Date	Name	Previous club	ISL club	Notes
16 June 2017	(Portugal) Bruno Pinheiro	(Israel) Hapoel Haifa	Goa	Free
5 July 2017	(Australia) Erik Paartalu	(Qatar) Al Kharaitiyat	Bengaluru FC	Free
10 July 2017	(Uruguay) Emiliano Alfaro	(United Arab Emirates) Al-Fujairah	Pune City	Free
11 July 2017	(Spain) Dimas Delgado	(Australia) Western Sydney Wanderers	Bengaluru FC	Free
12 July 2017	(Spain) Arana	(Australia) Brisbane Roar	Goa	Free
17 July 2017	(Spain) Toni	(Spain) Rayo Vallecano	Bengaluru FC	Free
18 July 2017	(Spain) Coro	(Cyprus) Doxa Katokopias	Goa	Free
19 July 2017	(Spain) Iñigo Calderón	(Cyprus) Anorthosis Famagusta	Chennaiyin	Free
24 July 2017	(Canada) Iain Hume	(Spain) Extremadura	Kerala Blasters	Free
26 July 2017	(Romania) Lucian Goian	(Australia) Perth Glory	Mumbai City	Free
27 July 2017	(Brazil) Gerson Vieira	(Brazil) Atlético Tubarão	Mumbai City	Free
27 July 2017	(Slovenia) Rene Mihelič	(Latvia) Riga	Chennaiyin	Free
28 July 2017	(Brazil) Paulinho Dias	(Brazil) Atlético Paranaense	Delhi Dynamos	Free
28 July 2017	(India) Manvir Singh	Free Agent	Goa	Free
28 July 2017	(Spain) Tiri	(Spain) Marbella	Jamshedpur FC	Free
31 July 2017	(Uruguay) Matías Mirabaje	(Peru) Unión Comercio	Delhi Dynamos	Free
2 August 2017	(Morocco) Ahmed Jahouh	(Morocco) FUS	Goa	Free
3 August 2017	(Brazil) Éverton Santos	(Brazil) Santa Cruz	Mumbai City	Free
4 August 2017	(Spain) Marcos Tébar	(Spain) Reus Deportiu	Pune City	Free
4 August 2017	(Spain) Rafa Jordà	(Spain) Llagostera	Mumbai City	Free
4 August 2017	(Republic of Ireland) Robbie Keane	(United States) LA Galaxy	Atlético de Kolkata	Free
7 August 2017	(Brazil) Léo Costa	(Brazil) Santa Cruz	Mumbai City	Free
7 August 2017	(Spain) Braulio Nóbrega	(Cyprus) Doxa Katokopias	Bengaluru FC	Free
8 August 2017	(Brazil) Márcio Rosário	(Indonesia) Persela Lamongan	Mumbai City	Free
8 August 2017	(South Africa) Sameehg Doutie	(South Africa) Ajax Cape Town	Jamshedpur FC	Free
10 August 2017	(Venezuela) Gabriel Cichero	(Venezuela) Deportivo Lara	Delhi Dynamos	Free
10 August 2017	(Ghana) Courage Pekuson	(Slovenia) FC Koper	Kerala Blasters	Free
10 August 2017	(Brazil) Memo	(Brazil) Fluminense	Jamshedpur FC	Free
11 August 2017	(Serbia) Nemanja Lakić-Pešić	(Austria) Kapfenberger SV	Kerala Blasters	Free
11 August 2017	(Portugal) Zequinha	(Portugal) Nacional	Atlético de Kolkata	Free
14 August 2017	(Spain) Chechi	(Spain) Hospitalet	Goa	Free
15 August 2017	(England) Wes Brown	(England) Blackburn Rovers	Kerala Blasters	Free
17 August 2017	(India) Davinder Singh	Free Agent	Mumbai City	Free
17 August 2017	(India) Gurpreet Singh Sandhu	(Norway) Stabæk Fotball	Bengaluru FC	Transfer (Undisclosed Amount)
18 August 2017	(Haiti) Kervens Belfort	(Azerbaijan) Zira	Jamshedpur FC	Free
19 August 2017	(England) Paul Rachubka	(England) Bury	Kerala Blasters	Free
20 August 2017	(Netherlands) Mark Sifneos	(Netherlands) RKC Waalwijk	Kerala Blasters	Free
21 August 2017	(Brazil) Marcelinho	(Brazil) Avaí	Pune City	Free
22 August 2017	(Spain) Jaime Gavilán	(South Korea) Suwon	Chennaiyin	Free
23 August 2017	(Spain) Manuel Lanzarote	(Spain) Real Zaragoza	Goa	Free
23 August 2017	(Spain) Rafa	(Spain) Real Valladolid	Pune City	Free
23 August 2017	(Bulgaria) Dimitar Berbatov	(Greece) PAOK	Kerala Blasters	Free
23 August 2017	(England) Conor Thomas	(England) Swindon Town	Atlético de Kolkata	Free
24 August 2017	(Brazil) Jonatan Lucca	(Israel) Bnei Sakhnin	Pune City	Free
29 August 2017	(Croatia) Damir Grgic	(Slovenia) Rudar Velenje	Pune City	Free
29 August 2017	(Venezuela) Miku	(Spain) Rayo Vallecano	Bengaluru FC	Free
29 August 2017	(Cameroon) André Bikey	(England) Port Vale	Jamshedpur FC	Free
31 August 2017	(Spain) Edu	(Spain) Real Zaragoza	Goa	Free
31 August 2017	(Cameroon) Achille Emaná	(Spain) Nàstic	Mumbai City	Free
31 August 2017	(India) Darren Caldeira	(India) Chennai City	Atlético de Kolkata	Free
31 August 2017	(India) Sandip Nandy	(India) Southern Samity	Kerala Blasters	Free
31 August 2017	(India) Nallappan Mohanraj	Free Agent	Atlético de Kolkata	Free
31 August 2017	(Finland) Jussi Jääskeläinen	(England) Wigan Athletic	Atlético de Kolkata	Free
1 September 2017	(Spain) Adrián Colunga	(Cyprus) Anorthosis	Goa	Free
1 September 2017	(Brazil) Matheus Goncalves	(Brazil) Flamengo	Jamshedpur FC	Free
2 September 2017	(Senegal) Talla N'Diaye	(Lebanon) Al-Ansar	Jamshedpur FC	Free
3 September 2017	(Brazil) Thiago Santos	(Brazil) Flamengo	Mumbai City	Loan
3 September 2017	(Spain) Edu García	(Spain) Real Zaragoza	Bengaluru FC	Free
4 September 2017	(England) Carl Baker	(England) Portsmouth	Atlético de Kolkata	Free
6 September 2017	(Nigeria) Jude Nworuh	(Finland) Ilves	Chennaiyin	Free
7 September 2017	(Nigeria) Kalu Uche	(Spain) Almería	Delhi Dynamos	Free
8 September 2017	(Brazil) Diego Carlos	(Brazil) São Bento	Pune City	Free
9 September 2017	(Spain) Jordi Figueras	(Germany) Karlsruher SC	Atlético de Kolkata	Free
11 September 2017	(England) Tom Thorpe	(England) Bolton Wanderers	Atlético de Kolkata	Free
12 September 2017	(Argentina) Robertino Pugliara	(Indonesia) Persipura Jayapura	Pune City	Free
12 September 2017	(Netherlands) Gregory Nelson	(Bahrain) Al-Muharraq	Chennaiyin	Free
12 September 2017	(Curaçao) Guyon Fernandez	(Netherlands) ADO Den Haag	Delhi Dynamos	Free
12 September 2017	(Spain) Edu Moya	(Spain) Cacereño	Delhi Dynamos	Free
12 September 2017	(Finland) Njazi Kuqi	(Finland) Inter Turku	Atlético de Kolkata	Free
12 September 2017	(Netherlands) Jeroen Lumu	(Turkey) Samsunspor	Delhi Dynamos	Free
13 September 2017	(Colombia) Luis Páez	(Colombia) Rionegro Águilas	NorthEast United	Free
13 September 2017	(Brazil) Marcinho	(Turkey) Gaziantepspor	NorthEast United	Free
13 September 2017	(Portugal) José Gonçalves	(United States) New England Revolution	NorthEast United	Free
13 September 2017	(Cape Verde) Odaïr Fortes	(France) Reims	NorthEast United	Free
13 September 2017	(Guinea-Bissau) Sambinha	(Portugal) Sporting CP	NorthEast United	Free
13 September 2017	(Brazil) Adilson	(Portugal) Arouca	NorthEast United	Free
13 September 2017	(Brazil) Wellington Silva	(Portugal) Feirense	NorthEast United	Free
13 September 2017	(Uruguay) Martín Díaz	(Uruguay) Liverpool	NorthEast United	Free
15 September 2017	(Brazil) Maílson Alves	(Brazil) Volta Redonda	Chennaiyin	Free
15 September 2017	(Portugal) Henrique Sereno	(Spain) Almería	Chennaiyin	Free
19 September 2017	(India) Jayananda Singh	Free agent	Delhi Dynamos	Free
19 September 2017	(India) Kishan Singh	Free agent	Delhi Dynamos	Free
19 September 2017	(India) Nanda Kumar	(India) Chennai City	Delhi Dynamos	Loan
15 February 2018	(Spain) Daniel Segovia	(Azerbaijan) Neftçi PFK	Bengaluru FC	Free
