= Sushil Meitei =

Indian footballer (born 1997)

Personal information
- Full name: Sushil Meitei Ahongshangbam
- Date of birth: 8 February 1997 (age 29)
- Place of birth: Manipur, India
- Height: 1.70 m (5 ft 7 in)
- Position: Winger

Team information
- Current team: NEROCA

Youth career
- Royal Wahingdoh

Senior career*
Years	Team	Apps	(Gls)
2015–2017	Royal Wahingdoh		
2017	→ Real Kashmir (loan)	4	(0)
2017–2018	NorthEast United	1	(0)
2018	→ Fateh Hyderabad (loan)	8	(4)
2018–2020	NEROCA	16	(1)
2020–2021	Bengaluru United		
2021–2022	Mohammedan	4	(0)
2023	Bengaluru United	3	(2)
2023–	NEROCA		
- * Club domestic league appearances and goals as of 21:20, 1 December 2023 (UTC)

Sushil Meitei Ahongshangbam (Meitei: Ahongshangbam Sushil Meitei, born 8 February 1997) is an Indian professional footballer who plays as a winger for NEROCA.

== Career ==
=== NorthEast United ===
On 23 July 2017, Sushil Meitei was drafted as a developmental player by NorthEast United in the 2017–18 ISL Players Draft. He made his debut in a match against ATK as an 83rd-minute substitution for Malemngamba Meitei.

=== Fateh Hyderabad ===
Sushil Meitei went on loan to Fateh Hyderabad after the end of 2017–18 ISL league stage. He made his debut for the team in a match against the FC Goa reserve squad, where he scored his debut goal and created two goals for his team.

=== Neroca FC ===
Sushil Meitei join NEROCA for the 2019–20 I-League season.

== Career statistics ==
=== Club ===
As of 24 March 2018

Club	Season	League		Super Cup		AFC		Total	
Club	Season	Apps	Goals	Apps	Goals	Apps	Goals	Apps	Goals
Royal Wahingdoh	2015–16	0	0	0	0	—	—	0	0
Royal Wahingdoh	2016–17	0	0	0	0	—	—	0	0
NorthEast United	2017–18	1	0	0	0	—	—	1	0
Fateh Hyderabad (loan)	2017–18	1	1	0	0	—	—	1	1
Career total		2	1	0	0	0	0	2	1

== Honours ==
Mohammedan Sporting

- Calcutta Football League: 2021
