= Robin Gurung =

Indian footballer

Personal information
- Full name: Robin Gurung
- Date of birth: 24 October 1992 (age 34)
- Place of birth: Tinkitam, Sikkim, India
- Height: 1.72 m (5 ft 7 1/2 in)
- Position: Defender

Team information
- Current team: Jamshedpur
- Number: 16

Senior career*
Years	Team	Apps	(Gls)
2010–2013	ONGC		
2013–2016	Shillong Lajong	41	(0)
2014	→ NorthEast United (loan)	11	(0)
2015	→ NorthEast United (loan)	5	(0)
2016–2017	NorthEast United	8	(0)
2017	→ East Bengal (loan)	5	(0)
2018–	Jamshedpur	9	(0)
- * Club domestic league appearances and goals as of 04:50, 15 December 2018 (UTC)

Robin Gurung (born 24 October 1992) is an Indian professional footballer who plays as a defender for Jamshedpur in the Indian Super League.

== Career ==
=== ONGC ===
Gurung made his professional debut for ONGC in the I-League on 4 December 2010 in the first round of the 2010–11 season against East Bengal at the Salt Lake Stadium in Kolkata, ONGC lost 1–0. At the end of the season ONGC were relegated, however after a good showing in the 2012 I-League 2nd Division in which ONGC finished in 2nd place the club were back in the I-League.

=== Shillong Lajong ===
On 18 July 2013 it was confirmed that Gurung has signed for Shillong Lajong with one other player Vinay Singh. Gurung made his debut for Shillong Lajong in the I-League on 22 September 2013 against Dempo at the Duler Stadium in which he played the whole match; as Shillong Lajong won the match 0–3.

=== NorthEast United ===
Robin represented North East United FC in the 2014 Indian Super League and was a regular, playing as a left back and garnered praise for his sturdy displays and excellent one-on-one defending.

=== Jamshedpur ===
On 23 July 2017, Gurung was selected in the 5th round of the 2017–18 ISL Players Draft by Jamshedpur for the 2017–18 Indian Super League. After not playing a single game during the ISL season, Gurung made his debut for Jamshedpur on 2 April 2018 in their Super Cup match against Minerva Punjab.

== Career statistics ==
=== Club ===
As of 5 April 2016

Club	Season	League		Federation Cup		Durand Cup		AFC		Total	
Club	Season	Apps	Goals	Apps	Goals	Apps	Goals	Apps	Goals	Apps	Goals
ONGC	2012–13	19	0	0	0	–	–	–	–	19	0
Shillong Lajong	2013–14	19	0	2	0	0	0	–	–	21	0
NorthEast United FC (loan)	2014 2015	15	0	0	0	–	–	–	–	15	0
Shillong Lajong	2014–15	14	0	0	0	–	–	–	–	14	0
Career total		67	0	2	0	0	0	0	0	69	0
