= Clyde Fernandes =

Indian footballer

Personal information
- Full name: Clyde Cyril Fernandes
- Date of birth: 18 October 1993 (age 33)
- Place of birth: Mumbai, Maharashtra, India
- Height: 1.82 m (5 ft 11 1/2 in)
- Position: Defender

Team information
- Current team: Ozone
- Number: 27

Youth career
- Mumbai

Senior career*
Years	Team	Apps	(Gls)
2016	Mumbai	7	(0)
2018–	Ozone	0	(0)

International career
2010	India U16		
- * Club domestic league appearances and goals as of 2 March 2018

Clyde Cyril Fernandes (born 18 October 1993) is an Indian professional footballer who plays as a defender for Ozone FC in the I-League 2nd Division.

== Career ==
Born in Mumbai, Fernandes made his professional debut on 11 January 2016 with Mumbai FC in the I-League, against Shillong Lajong. He played 59 minutes before coming off as Mumbai drew 0–0.

== International ==
Fernandes has played India at the under-16 level, going with the side to South Africa.

== Career statistics ==
As of 2 March 2016

Club	Season	League			League Cup		Domestic Cup		Continental		Total	
Club	Season	Division	Apps	Goals	Apps	Goals	Apps	Goals	Apps	Goals	Apps	Goals
Mumbai	2015–16	I-League	7	0	0	0	0	0	—	—	7	0
Career total			7	0	0	0	0	0	0	0	7	0
