= Danilo (footballer, born April 1991) =

Brazilian footballer

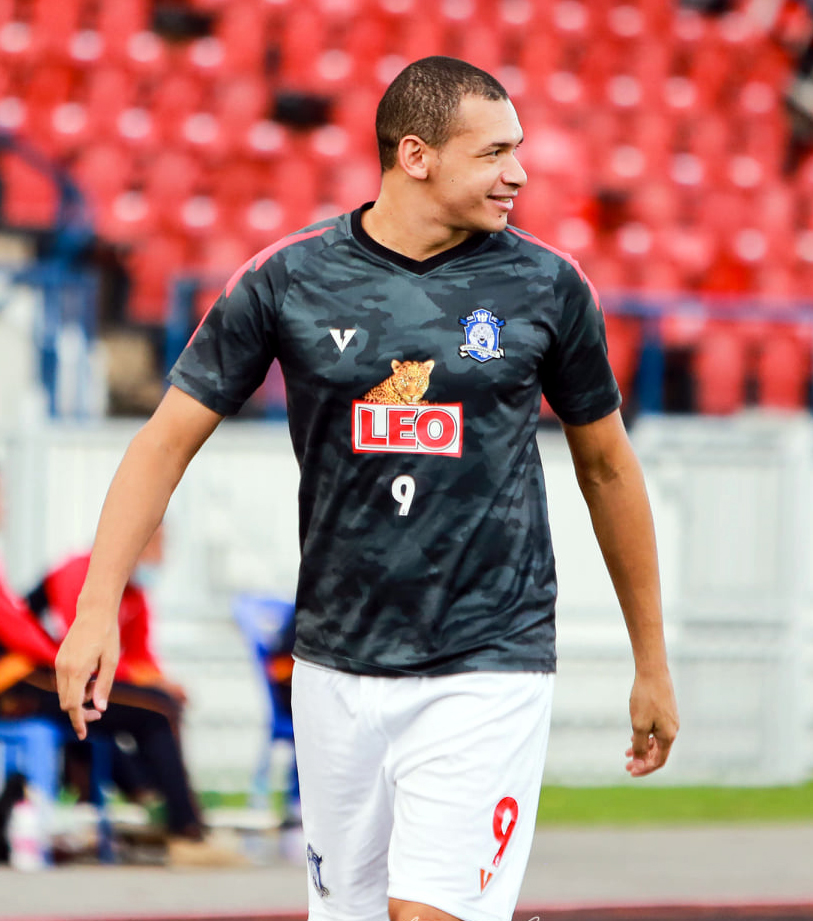

Personal information
- Full name: Danilo Lopes Cezario
- Date of birth: 25 April 1991 (age 35)
- Place of birth: Bicas, Brazil
- Height: 1.86 m (6 ft 1 in)
- Position: Forward

Team information
- Current team: Sisaket United
- Number: 9

Youth career
- 2010–2011: Santos

Senior career*
| Years | Team | Apps | (Gls) |
| 2012 | Penapolense | 0 | (0) |
| 2013 | CRAC | 24 | (3) |
| 2014 | Anapolina | 16 | (6) |
| 2014–2015 | Goiás | 12 | (3) |
| 2014 | → Vila Nova (loan) | 0 | (0) |
| 2015 | → Paraná (loan) | 2 | (0) |
| 2016 | → Anápolis (loan) | 13 | (1) |
| 2017 | Rio Claro | 20 | (9) |
| 2017 | Hapoel Tel Aviv | 0 | (0) |
| 2017–2018 | NorthEast United | 18 | (1) |
| 2018 | Kasetsart | ?? | (??) |
| 2019 | Água Santa | 6 | (0) |
| 2019 | Juventus da Mooca | 14 | (3) |
| 2020 | Rayong | 9 | (2) |
| 2020–2021 | Customs Ladkrabang United | 16 | (11) |
| 2021–2022 | Chiangmai | 15 | (3) |
| 2022–2023 | Pattaya Dolphins United | 16 | (9) |
| 2023–2025 | Sisaket United | 62 | (37) |
- * Club domestic league appearances and goals as of 9 March 2025

Danilo Lopes Cezario (born 25 April 1991), commonly known as Danilo, is a Brazilian footballer who plays as a forward for Thai League 2 club Sisaket United.

== Career ==
A graduate of the youth setup of Santos Futebol Clube, Danilo started his senior professional career with Clube Atlético Penapolense in 2012. In the following years, he represented Clube Recreativo e Atlético Catalano and Associação Atlética Anapolina. While playing for the latter, he managed to score six goals in the Campeonato Goiano competition. On 29 April 2014, he signed with top tier club Goiás Esporte Clube. On 14 May, he scored his first goal for the club in a 2–0 victory over Botafogo.

On 27 August 2015, Danilo was loaned to second tier club Paraná till the end of December 2015. On 9 November 2017, he switched to the Indian Super League and signed for NorthEast United FC as a replacement of fellow Brazilian Wellington who expressed his inability to play for the club for personal reasons. He scored his first goal for the club in a 2–0 victory over Delhi Dynamos FC on 2 December.

== Honours ==
=== Club ===
Sisaket United

- Thai League 3 : 2023–24
- Thai League 3 North Eastern Region : 2023–24

Pattaya Dolphins United

- Thai League 3 Eastern Region : 2022–23

=== Individual ===
- Thai League 3 Top Scorer (1): 2023–24
