= Simranjit Singh =

Indian footballer (born 1992)

Personal information
- Date of birth: 25 January 1992 (age 34)
- Place of birth: Punjab, India
- Position: Right back

Team information
- Current team: Delhi FC

Youth career
- St. Stephen's Football Academy Chandigarh Tata FA

Senior career*
Years	Team	Apps	(Gls)
2013–2015	Pailan Arrows	1	(0)
2014–2015	Bharat FC	5	(0)
2015	Mohammedan SC	0	(0)
2015–2017	Minerva Punjab FC	15	(2)
2017–2018	Delhi Dynamos	1	(0)
2018–19	NorthEast United	0	(0)
2019–20	Jamshedpur B	0	(0)
2021	Dempo SC	0	(0)
2021–2022	Delhi FC	4	(0)
2022-2023	Punjab FC Reserves and Academy	0	(0)
2023-2024	Doaba United	3	(1)
2024	Sudeva Delhi	8	(0)
2024-	Namdhari FC	0	(0)
- * Club domestic league appearances and goals as of 24 May 2015

Simranjit Singh (born 25 January 1992) is an Indian footballer who plays as a right back for Delhi FC in the I-League Qualifiers.

== Career ==
=== Pailan Arrows ===
Born in Punjab, Simranjit started his footballing career at the St. Stephen's Football Academy Chandigarh in 2004. After graduating from Tata Football Academy Singh joined I-League developmental side Pailan Arrows for the 2012–13 season and he made his debut for the club in the I-League on 20 January 2013 against Shillong Lajong F.C. in which he came off the bench at the 74th minute for Seminlen Doungel; Pailan Arrows won the match 1–0.

=== Bharat ===
In December 2014, Simranjit joined newly founded I-League team Bharat FC.

== Career statistics ==
=== Club ===
Statistics accurate as of 20 January 2013

Club	Season	League		Federation Cup		Durand Cup		AFC		Total	
Club	Season	Apps	Goals	Apps	Goals	Apps	Goals	Apps	Goals	Apps	Goals
Pailan Arrows	2012–13	1	0	0	0	0	0	—	—	1	0
Career total		1	0	0	0	0	0	0	0	1	0
