= Sena Ralte =

Indian footballer (born 1988)

Lalhmangaihsanga Ralte
Personal information
- Date of birth: 6 July 1988 (age 38)
- Place of birth: Kamalanagar, Mizoram, India
- Height: 1.75 m (5 ft 9 in)
- Position: Left back

Youth career
- Esthar F Academy
- Royal Wahingdoh

Senior career*
Years	Team	Apps	(Gls)
2014–2015	Royal Wahingdoh	15	(0)
2015	→ Chennaiyin (loan)	6	(0)
2016	DSK Shivajians	14	(0)
2016–2017	Mumbai City	16	(0)
2017	→ Bengaluru (loan)	7	(1)
2017–2018	Delhi Dynamos		
2018–2019	ATK		
2019–2022	Real Kashmir	32	(0)
2022–2023	FC Bethlehem		
2023–2024	Diamond Harbour		
- * Club domestic league appearances and goals

Lalhmangaihsanga "Sena" Ralte (born 6 July 1988) is an Indian professional footballer who plays as a left back for the I-League club Chanmari FC.

== Career ==
Born in Mizoram, Sena started his footballing career at the Esthar F Academy.

=== Royal Wahingdoh ===
He eventually joined the youth side of I-League 2nd Division side Royal Wahingdoh F.C. and was a part of the youth side that went on a trip to South Africa in March 2014. He then played a part in the senior Royal Wahingdoh side that participated in the 2014 I-League 2nd Division and gained promotion to the I-League.

He then made his professional debut for Royal Wahingdoh in the Federation Cup on 28 December 2014 against Mumbai. He started the match as Royal Wahingdoh won 2–1.

=== Chennaiyin (loan) ===
In July 2015 Lalhmangaihsanga was drafted to play for Chennaiyin FC in the 2015 Indian Super League.

=== DSK Shivajians ===
On 5 January 2016, Sena Ralte signed for new I-League club DSK Shivajians for 1 season. In whole season he was the instrumental player for the team and a regular starter of the team.

=== Mumbai City ===
In July 2016, Ralte signed on the dotted lines for Mumbai City FC for the third season of Hero ISL. He made his debut for Mumbai City In a match where Mumbai City beaten their Arch Rivals FC Pune City by 1–0.

=== Bengaluru FC (loan) ===
He was signed on loan from Mumbai City FC for 2016–17 I-League season. Ralte scored his debut goal for Bengaluru against Shillong Lajong from 35 yards.

=== Delhi Dynamos ===
Ralte was signed by Delhi Dynamos FC in 2017–18 ISL Players Draft.

=== ATK ===
Sena was signed by ATK on a two-year deal.

== Career statistics ==
As of 26 November 2017

Club	Season	League			Federation Cup		Durand Cup		AFC		Total	
Club	Season	Division	Apps	Goals	Apps	Goals	Apps	Goals	Apps	Goals	Apps	Goals
Royal Wahingdoh	2014–15	I-League	15	0	1	0	0	0	—	—	16	0
Chennaiyin	2015	Indian Super League	6	0	0	0	0	0	—	—	6	0
DSK Shivajians	2015–16	I-League	11	0	0	0	0	0	—	—	11	0
Mumbai City	2015	Indian Super League	16	0	0	0	0	0	—	—	16	0
Bengaluru	2016–17	I-League	7	1	0	0	0	0	1	0	8	1
Delhi Dynamos	2017–18	Indian Super League	2	0	0	0	0	0	0	0	2	0
ATK	2018–19	Indian Super League	2	0	0	0	0	0	0	0	2	0
Career total			58	1	1	0	0	0	1	0	60	1

== Honours ==
=== Club ===
Chennaiyin

- Indian Super League: 2015

Real Kashmir

- IFA Shield: 2020, 2021
