= Siam Hanghal =

Indian footballer (born 1993)

Personal information
- Full name: Jamkhansiam Siam Hanghal
- Date of birth: 26 May 1993 (age 33)
- Place of birth: Churachandpur district, Manipur, India
- Height: 1.82 m (5 ft 11 1/2 in)
- Position: Midfielder

Team information
- Current team: Madan Maharaj

Youth career
- Tata FA

Senior career*
Years	Team	Apps	(Gls)
2012–2013	Pailan Arrows	0	(0)
2013	→ DSK Shivajians (loan)		
2013–2016	Bengaluru	25	(1)
2015	→ NorthEast United (loan)	12	(0)
2016	Chennaiyin	10	(0)
2017	Mumbai	11	(0)
2017–2018	Kerala Blasters	8	(0)
2018–	Delhi Dynamos	0	(0)
2019	→ East Bengal (loan)	2	(0)
2019–2021	→ NEROCA	2	(0)

International career
2014	India U23		
- * Club domestic league appearances and goals

Jamkhansiam Siam Hanghal (born 26 May 1993) is an Indian professional footballer who plays as a midfielder for Madan Maharaj.

== Career ==
=== Early career and Bengaluru FC ===
Born in Churachandpur, Manipur, Hanghal began his football career at the Tata Football Academy before beginning his professional career in the I-League with Pailan Arrows. After not gaining much playing time during the 2012–13 season, Hanghal was loaned to I-League 2nd Division side DSK Shivajians. After the season, Hanghal signed with newly established Bengaluru FC for the 2013–14 I-League campaign. He made his professional debut for the club on 22 September 2013 in Bengaluru FC's first ever match against Mohun Bagan. He started the match and played the full ninety as Bengaluru FC drew 1–1. He then scored his first professional goal for the club on 23 October 2013 against Dempo. His sixth-minute strike was the first in a 3–1 victory. During his three-year spell with Bengaluru FC, Hanghal won two I-League titles and a Federation Cup.

==== NorthEast United (loan) ====
On 10 July 2015 it was announced that Hanghal had been drafted by NorthEast United for the 2015 Indian Super League. He made his debut for the team on 6 October 2015 against the Kerala Blasters. He started the match and played the whole 90 minutes as NorthEast United lost 3–1.

=== Chennaiyin ===
On 2 August 2016 Hanghal signed with Chennaiyin for the 2016 ISL season. He made his debut for the side on 2 October 2016 against Atlético de Kolkata in Chennaiyin's opening match. He came on as a 90th-minute substitute for Baljit Sahni as Chennaiyin drew the match 2–2. Hanghal then earned his first start for the team on 20 October against his former side, NorthEast United. His cross was converted into the net by Davide Succi as Chennaiyin came out 1–0 winners. Hanghal also earned the Emerging Player of the Match award for his performance.

=== Kerala Blasters ===
After a short stint with Mumbai in the I-League, Hanghal was selected in the 9th round of the 2017–18 ISL Players Draft by the Kerala Blasters for the 2017–18 Indian Super League on 23 July 2017. He made his debut for the club on 3 December 2017 in their match against Mumbai City. He came on as a 65th-minute substitute for Jackichand Singh as Kerala Blasters drew 1–1.

=== Delhi Dynamos ===
After one season with the Kerala Blasters, Hanghal signed with another ISL club, Delhi Dynamos on 11 June 2018.

=== Neroca FC ===
Neroca signed Hanghal for the upcoming I-league 2019–20 season.

== International ==
Hanghal has represented India at the under-23 level, including during the 2014 Asian Games.

== Career statistics ==
As of 11 June 2018

Club	Season	League			Cup		Continental		Total	
Club	Season	Division	Apps	Goals	Apps	Goals	Apps	Goals	Apps	Goals
Bengaluru	2013–14	I-League	21	1	3	1	—	—	24	2
Bengaluru	2014–15	I-League	2	0	0	0	7	0	9	0
Bengaluru	2015–16	I-League	2	0	0	0	3	0	5	0
Bengaluru	Bengaluru Total		25	1	3	1	10	0	38	2
NorthEast United (loan)	2015	ISL	12	0	—	—	—	—	12	0
Chennaiyin	2016	ISL	10	0	—	—	—	—	10	0
Mumbai	2016–17	I-League	11	0	—	—	—	—	11	0
Kerala Blasters	2017–18	ISL	8	0	—	—	—	—	8	0
Delhi Dynamos	2018–19	ISL	0	0	—	—	—	—	0	0
Career total			66	1	3	1	10	0	79	2

== Honours ==
=== Club ===
Bengaluru FC

- I-League: 2013–14, 2015–16
- Federation Cup: 2014–15
