= Samuel Shadap =

Indian footballer (born 1992)

Personal information
- Full name: Samuel Shadap
- Date of birth: 26 November 1992 (age 33)
- Place of birth: Shillong, Meghalaya
- Height: 1.64 m (5 ft 4 1/2 in)
- Position: Right back

Team information
- Current team: Delhi FC
- Number: 15

Youth career
- 2006–2012: Shillong Lajong

Senior career*
Years	Team	Apps	(Gls)
2012–2017	Shillong Lajong	51	(0)
2017	Kerala Blasters	4	(0)
2017–2018	Kerala Blasters (B)	8	(0)
2019–2020	→ Southern Samity(loan)	7	(0)
2019–20	→ Punjab FC (loan)	11	(0)
2020	Mohammedan SC	1	(0)
2020–2021	Churchill Brothers	0	(0)
2021–	Delhi FC		
- * Club domestic league appearances and goals

Samuel Shadap (born 26 November 1992) is an Indian professional footballer who plays as a right back for Delhi FC.

== Career ==
Shadap starting training with Shillong Lajong F.C. at their Academy in 2006. Then before the 2012–13 I-League season began it was officially announced that Shadap had signed his first professional contract with Shillong Lajong after his impressive performance in the North East Super Series during pre-season. He then made his debut for the club on 6 October 2012 against Mohun Bagan in which he came on as a 68th-minute substitute for Renedy Singh as Shillong Lajong won the match 2–0.

=== Kerala Blasters FC ===
On 23 July 2017, Shadap was selected in the 12th round of the 2017–18 ISL Players Draft by the Kerala Blasters for the 2017–18 Indian Super League. He made his debut for the club on 22 December 2017 against Chennaiyin. He came on as a 43rd-minute substitute for Rino Anto as Kerala Blasters drew 1–1. Shadap then made his first start for the Kerala Blasters the next game in the absence of Anto against Bengaluru.

=== Kerala Blasters FC (B) ===
Shadap's inconsistency in performance had put him in the B-team of Blasters. He played I League 2nd Division with the Kerala Blasters FC(B).

=== Churchill Brothers SC ===
Samuel Shadap Currently joined Churchill Brothers S.C. for the 2020–21 I-League.

== Career statistics ==
=== Club ===
As of 5 March 2020

Club	Season	League		Federation Cup		Durand Cup		AFC		Total	
Club	Season	Apps	Goals	Apps	Goals	Apps	Goals	Apps	Goals	Apps	Goals
Shillong Lajong	2012–13	7	0	0	0	0	0	—	—	7	0
Shillong Lajong	2013-14	7	0	1	0	0	0	—	—	8	0
Shillong Lajong	2014-15	7	0	4	0	0	0	—	—	11	0
Shillong Lajong	2015-16	15	0	0	0	0	0	—	—	15	0
Shillong Lajong	2016-17	15	0	0	0	0	0	—	—	15	0
Kerala Blasters	2017-18	13	0	0	0	0	0	—	—	0	0
Southern Samity	2019-20	7	0	0	0	0	0	—	—	0	0
Punjab F.C.	2019-20	11	0	0	0	0	0	—	—	0	0
Mohammedan S.C.	2019-20	1	0	0	0	0	0	—	—	0	0
Churchill Brothers S.C.	2020-21	0	0	0	0	0	0	—	—	0	0
Career total		82	0	5	0	0	0	0	0	60	0
