= Martín Díaz =

Uruguayan footballer (born 1988)

Personal information
- Full name: Martín Damián Díaz Peña
- Date of birth: 17 March 1988 (age 38)
- Place of birth: Montevideo, Uruguay
- Height: 1.87 m (6 ft 2 in)
- Position: Centre-back

Team information
- Current team: Cultural Santa Rosa

Senior career*
| Years | Team | Apps | (Gls) |
| 2007 | Rentistas | 14 | (0) |
| 2008–2010 | Defensor Sporting | 3 | (0) |
| 2009 | → Dinamo București II (loan) | 8 | (0) |
| 2011–2012 | Badajoz | 9 | (0) |
| 2012–2014 | Montevideo Wanderers | 41 | (1) |
| 2014–2015 | Atlético Rafaela | 6 | (0) |
| 2015–2017 | Liverpool | 33 | (1) |
| 2017–2018 | NorthEast United | 16 | (0) |
| 2018–2019 | Pune City | 13 | (0) |
| 2019 | Racing Club | 8 | (0) |
| 2020– | Cultural Santa Rosa | | |

International career
| 2005 | Uruguay U17 | 3 | (0) |
| 2007 | Uruguay U20 | 2 | (0) |
- * Club domestic league appearances and goals as of 19:44, 9 April 2021 (UTC)

Martín Damián Díaz Peña (born 17 March 1988, in Montevideo) is a Uruguayan footballer who plays as a centre-back.

== International career ==
Díaz was capped by Uruguayan under-17 squad for the 2005 FIFA U-17 World Championship, tournament where he was the captain of the team.
