= Sambinha =

Bissau-Guinean footballer

Personal information
- Full name: Mamadu Samba Candé
- Date of birth: 23 September 1992 (age 34)
- Place of birth: Cascais, Portugal
- Height: 1.84 m (6 ft 1/2 in)
- Position: Centre back

Team information
- Current team: Ironi Tiberias
- Number: 4

Youth career
- 2000–2001: Esperanças Alcoitão
- 2001–2004: 1º Dezembro
- 2004–2005: Sporting CP
- 2005–2008: Estoril
- 2008–2010: Sporting Lourel
- 2010−2011: 1º Dezembro

Senior career*
Years	Team	Apps	(Gls)
2011−2013	1º Dezembro	40	(2)
2013−2017	Sporting CP B	72	(4)
2016	→ New England Revolution (loan)	2	(0)
2017	→ Sporting Covilhã (loan)	4	(1)
2017−2018	NorthEast United	14	(1)
2018	Dezembro	0	(0)
2018−2019	Messina	9	(0)
2019−2022	Olympiakos Nicosia	48	(1)
2022−2025	Maccabi Bnei Reineh	83	(4)
2025−	Ironi Tiberias	29	(3)

International career^{‡}
2015	Guinea-Bissau	2	(0)
- * Club domestic league appearances and goals as of 24 June 2026 ‡ National team caps and goals as of 13 June 2015

Mamadu Samba Candé (born 23 September 1992), known as Sambinha, is a professional footballer who played as a centre back for Israeli Premier League side Ironi Tiberias. Born in Portugal, he represented the Guinea-Bissau national football team.

== Club career ==
=== New England Revolution ===
On 1 October 2014 the New England Revolution of Major League Soccer entered into a "strategic partnership" with Primeira Liga club Sporting CP. The agreement allowed for the Revolution to bring in Sporting players on loan, as well as allow the clubs’ academy teams, youth players and coaches to spend training time with the other organization's teams. Sambinha became the first player to join the Revolution as part of this deal, joining on a one-year loan with an option to buy on 22 January 2016. Speaking on the signing, Revolution GM Mike Burns called Sambinha "a big, strong center back" and added that Sambinha "will be able to help strengthen our defense and we are grateful to be able to work with Sporting in order to add a player of his quality to our roster for the upcoming season."

Sambinha made his Revolution debut on 14 May 2016, coming on as a substitute for Juan Agudelo in the Revolution's 2–0 win over Chicago Fire FC. He would start his first match for the club on 21 May 2016, against FC Dallas.

Sambinha had his U.S. Open Cup debut on 29 June 2016, playing the full 90 minutes in the club's win over the New York Cosmos. He would start the Revolution's U.S. Open Cup Quarter Final win against the Philadelphia Union on 20 July 2016.

The New England Revolution waived Sambinha on 29 August 2016.

== Career statistics ==
=== Club ===
As of 30 May 2024

Club	Season	League			National Cup		Other		Total	
Club	Season	Division	Apps	Goals	Apps	Goals	Apps	Goals	Apps	Goals
1º Dezembro	2011-12	Campeonato de Portugal	10	0	—		—		10	0
1º Dezembro	2012-13	Campeonato de Portugal	30	2	—		—		30	2
1º Dezembro	Total		40	2	—		—		40	2
Sporting CP B	2013-14	Liga Portugal 2	17	0	—		—		17	0
Sporting CP B	2014-15	Liga Portugal 2	34	2	—		—		34	2
Sporting CP B	2015-16	Liga Portugal 2	21	2	—		—		21	2
Sporting CP B	Total		72	4	—		—		72	4
New England Revolution (loan)	2016	MLS	2	0	2	0	—		4	0
Sporting Covilhã (loan)	2016-17	Liga Portugal 2	12	1	—		—		12	1
NorthEast United	2017-18	Indian Super League	14	1	—		—		14	1
1º Dezembro	2018-19	Campeonato de Portugal	9	0	—		—		9	0
Olympiakos Nicosia	2019-20	Cypriot First Division	21	0	1	0	—		22	0
Olympiakos Nicosia	2020-21	Cypriot First Division	17	0	3	0	—		20	0
Olympiakos Nicosia	2021-22	Cypriot First Division	27	1	1	0	—		28	1
Olympiakos Nicosia	Total		65	1	5	0	—		70	1
Maccabi Bnei Reineh	2022-23	Israeli Premier League	20	0	1	0	5 (Note: Appearance(s) in Toto Cup)	0	26	0
Maccabi Bnei Reineh	2023-24	Israeli Premier League	35	2	0	0	4	0	39	2
Maccabi Bnei Reineh	2024-25	Israeli Premier League	28	2	4	1	3	0	35	3
Maccabi Bnei Reineh	Total		83	4	5	1	12	0	100	5
Ironi Tiberias	2025-26	Israeli Premier League	20	0	1	0	5	0	0	0
Ironi Tiberias	Total		0	0	0	0	0	0	0	0
Career Total			297	13	12	1	12	0	321	14
