= David Ngaihte =

Indian footballer (born 1989)

Personal information
- Date of birth: 16 December 1989 (age 36)
- Place of birth: Manipur, India
- Height: 1.76 m (5 ft 9 1/2 in)
- Position: Winger

Team information
- Current team: Tollygunge Agragami F.C.

Youth career
- Goodwill FC

Senior career*
| Years | Team | Apps | (Gls) |
| 2012–2013 | Southern Samity | | |
| 2013–2014 | Rangdajied | 21 | (2) |
| 2015 | Shillong Lajong | 6 | (0) |
| 2014 | → NorthEast United (loan) | 2 | (0) |
| 2015 | F.C. Zalen | | |
| 2016 | Guwahati F.C. | | |
| 2017 | Minerva Punjab | 14 | (1) |
| 2017 | Delhi Dynamos | 10 | (1) |
| 2018 | Tollygunge Agragami | | |
- * Club domestic league appearances and goals as of 1 November 2017

David Ngaihte (born 16 December 1989) is an Indian professional footballer who last played as a winger for Tollygunge Agragami.

== Career ==
=== Early career ===
With the motivation to perform in academics and to get access to better education, David Ngaihte was sent to Delhi. In the capital, while practising with friends in the evening, as is a norm with the North Eastern guys, a Delhi club named Goodwill FC sported him and offered him to play for them in 2008.

During this time, Ngaihte attracted the notice of the capital's football aficionados and soon earned a berth for the Delhi Santosh Trophy team.

He spent the next three years completing his academics and switching between Delhi clubs. It wasn't until the 2012 Santosh Trophy in Odisha that, David Ngaihte though he could curve out a career for himself in football.

Noticed by Southern Samity in the Santosh Trophy, he joined the Kolkata club and had tremendously contributed for the team's good run in the 2013 I-League 2nd Division that saw them in the final round of the competition.

=== Rangdajied ===
David made his professional debut for Rangdajied in the I-League on 4 October 2013 against Dempo at the Jawaharlal Nehru Stadium, Shillong and played the whole match; as Rangdajied drew the match 2–2.

=== Shillong Lajong ===
On 5 May 2014 it was announced that Ngaihte has signed for Shillong Lajong on a one-year contract.

== Career statistics ==
As of 10 March 2017

| Club | Season | League | | Federation Cup | | Durand Cup | | AFC | | Total | |
| Club | Season | Apps | Goals | Apps | Goals | Apps | Goals | Apps | Goals | Apps | Goals |
|---|---|---|---|---|---|---|---|---|---|---|---|
| Rangdajied United | 2013-14 | 22 | 2 | 2 | 0 | 0 | 0 | – | – | 24 | 2 |
| Shillong Lajong | 2013-14 | 1 | 0 | 0 | 0 | 0 | 0 | – | – | 1 | 0 |
| NorthEast United FC (loan) | 2013-14 | 2 | 0 | – | – | – | – | – | – | 2 | 0 |
| Shillong Lajong | 2014-15 | 6 | 0 | 0 | 0 | 0 | 0 | – | – | 6 | 0 |
| Minerva Punjab FC | 2014-15 | 10 | 1 | 0 | 0 | 0 | 0 | – | – | 10 | 1 |
| Career total | | 41 | 3 | 2 | 0 | 0 | 0 | 0 | 0 | 43 | 3 |
