= Adilson Goiano =

Brazilian footballer (born 1988)

Personal information
- Full name: Adilson Carlos Tavares Filho
- Date of birth: 9 February 1988 (age 38)
- Place of birth: Goiânia, Brazil
- Height: 1.80 m (5 ft 11 in)
- Position: Midfielder

Team information
- Current team: Juventus

Senior career*
Years	Team	Apps	(Gls)
2010–2011	Vila Nova	63	(1)
2012–2014	XV de Piracicaba	43	(2)
2013	→ América RN (loan)	5	(0)
2014	Ponte Preta	26	(0)
2015	Bragantino	16	(0)
2015–2017	Arouca	64	(5)
2017	Northeast United FC	4	(0)
2018–2022	Novorizontino	97	(3)
2018	→ Sampaio Corrêa (loan)	15	(0)
2019	→ Criciúma (loan)	10	(0)
2022	Trindade		
2023–	Juventus	15	(1)
- * Club domestic league appearances and goals as of 11 March 2023

Adilson Carlos Tavares Filho (born 9 February 1988), known as Adilson Goiano or simply Adilson, is a Brazilian footballer who plays as a midfielder for Juventus.

== Club career ==
In April 2019, he joined Criciúma.
