= Seiminlen Doungel =

Indian footballer (born 1994)

Personal information
- Full name: Seiminlen Doungel
- Date of birth: 3 January 1994 (age 32)
- Place of birth: Saikul, Manipur, India
- Height: 1.72 m (5 ft 8 in)
- Position: Winger

Youth career
- 2009–2011: JCT
- 2011–2012: East Bengal

Senior career*
Years	Team	Apps	(Gls)
2011–2014	East Bengal	17	(4)
2013	→ Pailan Arrows (loan)	11	(2)
2014–2015	Shillong Lajong	15	(1)
2014	→ NorthEast United (loan)	9	(1)
2015–2017	Bengaluru	18	(3)
2015	→ Delhi Dynamos (loan)	7	(0)
2017–2018	NorthEast United	16	(4)
2018–2019	Kerala Blasters	18	(2)
2019–2021	Goa	21	(1)
2021	→ Jamshedpur (loan)	8	(1)
2021–2025	Jamshedpur	67	(4)
2025–2026	Calicut	1	(1)
2026	Inter Kashi	4	(0)

International career^{‡}
2014–2016	India U23	3	(0)
2018–2019	India	3	(1)
- * Club domestic league appearances and goals as of 21:48, 20 January 2026 (IST) ‡ National team caps and goals as of 16:10, 14 November 2019 (UTC)

Seiminlen Doungel (born 3 January 1994), commonly known as Len Doungel, is an Indian professional footballer who plays as a winger.

== Career ==
=== East Bengal ===
Born in Saikul, Manipur, Doungel started his career in the youth team of JCT before joining East Bengal of the I-League in 2011. During his first season with the club Doungel played only a few times before making his international cup debut for East Bengal in the AFC Cup on 9 May 2012 against Kazma. He started that match and played 72 minutes before being substituted off as East Bengal lost 2–1.

==== Pailan Arrows (loan) ====
On 11 January 2013, during the 2012–13 season, Doungel was loaned out to fellow I-League side Pailan Arrows for the rest of the season. He made his debut for the side on 12 January against Air India. He played 88 minutes before being substituted off as Pailan Arrows drew the match 1–1. He scored his first professional goal of his career for the club on 24 March 2013 against Mohun Bagan. He found the net in the 49th minute but could not help his side from losing 3–2 that match.

Doungel then scored his second and final goal for Pailan Arrows on 20 April 2013 against Salgaocar. His 36th-minute strike being the lone goal for Arrows as the fell on the day 2–1.

==== Return to East Bengal ====
For the 2013–14 season Doungel returned to East Bengal. He made his return debut for the club on 1 November 2013 against Salgaocar at the Kalyani Stadium. Doungel came on as a 71st-minute substitute for Chidi Edeh and then scored a 77th-minute goal for East Bengal, however, the club still went on to lose 3–2. He then scored his second goal of the season on 23 March 2014 against Rangdajied United after coming on as a 53rd-minute substitute for James Moga. East Bengal went on to win that match 3–1.

Doungel then finished his East Bengal career with two goals in two games. The first goal came against Pune on 19 April. His 75th-minute strike being the winner in a 2–1 victory for East Bengal. His second goal then came against United Sports Club on 28 April, being the last goal scored in a 3–0 rout.

=== Shillong Lajong ===
On 5 May 2014, following the conclusion of the 2013–14 season, it was announced that Doungel had signed for Shillong Lajong who also play in the I-League. Len represented NorthEast United in the 2014 Indian Super League, scoring once. Len played regularly for Lajong during the 2014-15 I-League season, scoring once in the final round against former club East Bengal in a 5–1 win which secured Lajong's stay in the I-League for the next season.

=== Bengaluru FC ===
On 3 June 2015, Bengaluru announced the signing of Len from Shillong Lajong on a two-year deal.

==== Delhi Dynamos (loan) ====
In July 2015 Doungel was chosen to play for Delhi Dynamos in the 2015 Indian Super League.

=== NorthEast United ===
On 23 July 2017, Doungel has been drafted to Northeast United FC for ISL season 4. On 6 January, Len scored his first goal in ISL-4 against FC Goa. He scored a hat-trick against Chennaiyin on 19 January making him the first Indian player to score a hat-trick in ISL-4 and also it was the first hat-trick of NorthEast United.

=== Kerala Blasters ===
In June 2018, Doungel signed a three-year contract with Kerala Blasters. He was then called to join the team camp of the India national team for the 2018 Intercontinental Cup.

=== FC Goa ===
On 20 May 2019, Doungel signed a two-year contract with Goa on a free transfer from Kerala Blasters. He remained with the Gaurs till the summer of 2021.

=== Jamshedpur FC ===
On 5 August 2021, it was announced that Doungel had signed a 3-year contract with Jamshedpur FC.

== Career statistics ==
As of 21 March 2022

Club	Season	League			Domestic Cup (Note: Federation Cup/Super Cup)		Other Cup (Note: Durand Cup/IFA Shield)		Other		AFC		Total	
Club	Season	Division	Apps	Goals	Apps	Goals	Apps	Goals	Apps	Goals	Apps	Goals	Apps	Goals
East Bengal	2011–12	I-League	4	0	0	0	1	0	10 (Note: Appearances in Calcutta Football League.)	6	1	0	16	6
East Bengal	2012–13	I-League	0	0	0	0	0	0	5	1	0	0	5	1
East Bengal	2013–14	I-League	17	4	0	0	4	1	8	3	0	0	29	8
East Bengal	East Bengal Total		21	4	0	0	5	1	23	10	1	0	50	15
Pailan Arrows (loan)	2012–13	I-League	11	2	0	0	0	0	—	—	—	—	11	2
Shillong Lajong	2014–15	I-League	15	1	4	0	0	0	—	—	—	—	19	1
NorthEast United (loan)	2014	Indian Super League	10	1	—	—	—	—	—	—	—	—	10	1
Bengaluru	2015–16	I-League	13	2	2	0	0	0	—	—	4	1	19	3
Delhi Dynamos (loan)	2015	Indian Super League	8	0	—	—	—	—	—	—	—	—	8	0
Bengaluru	2016–17	I-League	5	1	0	0	0	0	—	—	6	1	13	2
NorthEast United	2017–18	Indian Super League	16	4	1	0	—	—	—	—	—	—	16	4
Kerala Blasters	2018–19	Indian Super League	18	2	1	0	—	—	—	—	—	—	19	2
Goa	2019–20	Indian Super League	15	1	0	0	—	—	—	—	0	0	15	1
Goa	2020–21	Indian Super League	7	0	—	—	—	—	—	—	—	—	7	0
Goa	Goa total		22	1	0	0	0	0	0	0	0	0	22	1
Jamshedpur (loan)	2021	Indian Super League	8	1	—	—	—	—	—	—	—	—	8	1
Jamshedpur	2021–22	Indian Super League	19	2	—	—	—	—	—	—	—	—	19	2
Jamshedpur	Jamshedpur total		27	3	0	0	0	0	0	0	0	0	27	3
Career total			166	21	8	0	5	1	23	10	11	2	213	34

=== International ===
As of matches played till 14 November 2019

National team	Year	Apps	Goals
India	2019	3	1
Total		3	1

==== International goals ====
Scores and results list India's goal tally first

No.	Date	Venue	Cap	Opponent	Score	Result	Competition	Ref.
1.	14 November 2019	Pamir Stadium, Dushanbe, Tajikistan	3	Afghanistan	1–1	1–1	2022 FIFA World Cup qualification	

== Honours ==
Jamshedpur

- Indian Super League Premiers: 2021–22
