= Munmun Lugun =

Indian footballer (born 1993)

Personal information
- Full name: Munmum Timothy Lugun
- Date of birth: 5 May 1993 (age 33)
- Place of birth: Delhi, India
- Height: 1.76 m (5 ft 9 1/2 in)
- Position: Centre-back

Team information
- Current team: Kannur Warriors FC
- Number: 13

Senior career*
Years	Team	Apps	(Gls)
- Simla Youngs
2012–2013	United Sikkim	24	(0)
2013–2014	Rangdajied United	18	(0)
2014	Delhi Dynamos		
2014-2015	Pune	10	(0)
2016	Minerva Punjab		
2016–2017	Mumbai City		
2017	→ Mumbai (loan)	9	(0)
2017–2018	Delhi Dynamos	9	(0)
2019–2020	Punjab	7	(0)
2020–2021	Mohammedan		
2021	→ Garhwal (loan)		
2021–2022	Kerala United		
2022–2024	Delhi		
2024–	Kannur Warriors		
- * Club domestic league appearances and goals

Munmun Timothy Lugun (born 5 May 1993) is an Indian professional footballer who plays as a defender for Super League Kerala club Kannur Warriors.

== Career ==
Born in Delhi, Lugun started his football career with Simla Youngs in the I-League 2. He also captained his state youth team during the B.C. Roy Trophy in 2010. In 2012 Lugun signed with United Sikkim for their 2nd Division campaign and helped the club earn promotion to the I-League. He made his professional debut for the club in the I-League in their opening match against Salgaocar on 6 October 2012. Lugun started and played the full match as United Sikkim won 3–2. By the end of the season, despite the club being relegated, Lugun himself started and played 24 of United Sikkim's 26 matches.

After United Sikkim were relegated, Lugun signed with another I-League side, Rangdajied United. He made his debut for the club on 22 September 2013 against Prayag United. He started and played the full match as Rangdajied United lost 2–0. Then, after the 2013–14 I-League season, Lugun was selected by the Delhi Dynamos in the Indian Super League domestic draft for the inaugural season. Lugun only made one appearance for the Delhi side during the season, on 28 November 2014 against Mumbai City. He started and played the full match as Delhi Dynamos won 4–1.

On 22 December 2014, after the ISL season, Lugun signed with Pune for the 2014–15 I-League. He made his debut for the side on 14 February 2015 against Dempo. Lugun came on as a 72nd-minute substitute for Yumnam Raju as Pune and Dempo drew the match 0–0.

On 25 March 2016 it was announced that Lugun would be part of the Minerva Academy squad in the I-League 2. After the 2nd Division season, in September 2016 it was revealed that Lugun had signed with Indian Super League side Mumbai City.

== Career statistics ==
As of 18 February 2017

Club	Season	League			League Cup		Domestic Cup		Continental		Total	
Club	Season	Division	Apps	Goals	Apps	Goals	Apps	Goals	Apps	Goals	Apps	Goals
United Sikkim	2012–13	I-League	24	0	—	—	3	0	—	—	27	0
Rangdajied United	2013–14	I-League	18	0	—	—	2	0	—	—	20	0
Delhi Dynamos	2014	ISL	1	0	—	—	—	—	—	—	1	0
Pune	2014–15	I-League	10	0	—	—	—	—	—	—	10	0
Mumbai City	2016	ISL	0	0	—	—	—	—	—	—	0	0
Mumbai	2014–15	I-League	10	0	—	—	—	—	—	—	10	0
Career total			62	0	0	0	5	0	0	0	62	0

== Honours ==
=== Club ===
United Sikkim

- I-League 2: 2012
