= Wellington (footballer, born 1987) =

Brazilian footballer

Personal information
- Full name: Wellington Carlos da Silva
- Date of birth: 5 October 1987 (age 39)
- Place of birth: Ribeirão Preto, Brazil
- Height: 1.86 m (6 ft 1 in)
- Position: Striker

Senior career*
Years	Team	Apps	(Gls)
2010–2011	America	16	(5)
2011	Sendas	6	(0)
2012	Sertãozinho	8	(0)
2012–2015	Concordia Chiajna	75	(19)
2015–2016	Pandurii Târgu Jiu	14	(1)
2016–2017	AEL Limassol	18	(1)
2017	Feirense	1	(0)
Total		138	(26)
- * Club domestic league appearances and goals

Wellington Carlos da Silva (born 5 October 1987) is a Brazilian footballer who last played as a striker for Feirense.

== Career ==
After having played for Sertãozinho in his country, Wellington moved abroad, signing for Romanian club Concordia on 27 June 2012. He was a victim of a racial abuse during a match in September 2014 against Rapid București with a banana being thrown at him. One week later, the fan who threw the banana apologised and Wellington reportedly promised to give him a signed Jersey besides accepting a public apology. In April 2015, it was announced that he demanded an early termination of his contract so that he could return to Brazil for treatment of an injury. On 29 April 2015, he officially terminated his contract after spending three seasons with it during which he scored 19 goals.

On 24 June 2015, Wellington moved to Pandurii of the same league, penning a one-year deal. After having scored a single goal for the club, he switched clubs and countries, signing for Cypriot club AEL Limassol on 9 May 2016. On 31 January 2017, he joined Portuguese club Feirense.
