= Ravi Kumar (footballer) =

Indian footballer (born 1993)

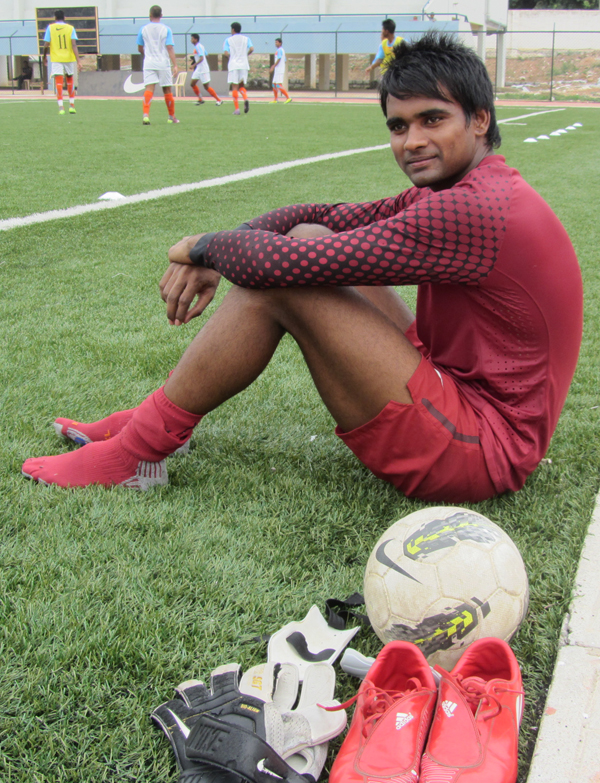

Personal information
- Date of birth: 7 April 1993 (age 33)
- Place of birth: Uttar Pradesh, India
- Height: 1.83 m (6 ft 0 in)
- Position: Goalkeeper

Team information
- Current team: Gokulam Kerala
- Number: 1

Youth career
- 2008–2012: TFA

Senior career*
Years	Team	Apps	(Gls)
2010–2013	Pailan Arrows	9	(0)
2013–2017	Sporting Goa	36	(0)
2015	→ Delhi Dynamos (loan)	0	(0)
2017	→ Minerva Punjab (loan)	2	(0)
2017–2018	NorthEast United	2	(0)
2018–2020	Mumbai City	2	(0)
2020–2022	Odisha	2	(0)
2022	→ Mumbai City (loan)	0	(0)
2022–2026	Punjab	0	(0)
2026–	Gokulam Kerala		

International career
2011	India U19	3	(0)
2015	India U23	3	(0)
- * Club domestic league appearances and goals as of 20:45, 27 February 2021 (UTC)

Ravi Kumar (born 4 July 1993) is an Indian footballer who plays as a goalkeeper for Indian Football League club Gokulam Kerala.

== Career ==
=== Pailan Arrows ===
Kumar signed for Pailan Arrows in 2010 when they were called AIFF XI. Kumar made his professional debut for Pailan Arrows in the I-League on 2 February 2012 against reigning champions Salgaocar at the Salt Lake Stadium; Kumar managed to keep the clean-sheet as Arrows drew the match 0–0.

=== Sporting Goa ===
On 18 July it was confirmed that Kumar has signed for Sporting Goa with Deepak Devrani. He made his debut for Sporting Goa in the I-League on 21 September 2013 against Mumbai F.C. at the Balewadi Sports Complex; as Sporting Goa drew the match 1–1.

==== Delhi Dynamos (loan) ====
In July 2015 Kumar was drafted to play for Delhi Dynamos in the 2015 Indian Super League.

==== Minerva Punjab (loan) ====
In December 2016, Kumar signed in the favor of New I league team Minerva Punjab on loan from Sporting Goa for 2016-17 I-League.

=== NorthEast United ===
On 23 July 2017, Kumar was picked by Northeast United FC in Hero ISL draft.

=== Odisha ===
On 29 June 2020, Ravi Kumar joined Odisha FC on a two-year deal.

== International ==
Kumar made his international debut at the under-19 level for India U19 against Turkmenistan in 2012 AFC U-19 Championship qualification on 31 October 2012.

== Career statistics ==
=== Club ===
As of 27 February 2021

Club	Season	League			Cup		AFC		Total	
Club	Season	Division	Apps	Goals	Apps	Goals	Apps	Goals	Apps	Goals
Pailan Arrows	2010–11	I-League	0	0	0	0	—		0	0
Pailan Arrows	2011–12	I-League	3	0	0	0	—		3	0
Pailan Arrows	2012–13	I-League	6	0	3 (Note: Appearance(s) in Durand Cup) (Note: Appearance(s) in Federation Cup)	0	—		9	0
Pailan Arrows	Palian Arrows total		9	0	3	0	0	0	12	0
Sporting Goa	2013–14	I-League	19	0	5	0	—		24	0
Sporting Goa	2014–15	I-League	17	0	1	0	—		18	0
Sporting Goa	Sporting Goa total		36	0	6	0	0	0	42	0
Delhi Dynamos (loan)	2015	Indian Super League	0	0	0	0	—		0	0
Minerva Punjab (loan)	2016–17	I-League	2	0	0	0	—		2	0
NorthEast United	2017–18	Indian Super League	2	0	0	0	—		2	0
Mumbai City	2018–19	Indian Super League	2	0	1 (Note: Appearance(s) in Super Cup)	0	—		3	0
Mumbai City	2019–20	Indian Super League	0	0	0	0	—		0	0
Mumbai City	Mumbai City total		2	0	1	0	0	0	3	0
Odisha	2020–21	Indian Super League	2	0	0	0	—		2	0
Odisha	2021–22	Indian Super League	0	0	0	0	—		0	0
Odisha	Odisha total		2	0	0	0	0	0	2	0
Mumbai City (loan)	2021–22	Indian Super League	0	0	0	0	—		0	0
RoundGlass Punjab	2022–23	I-League	0	0	0	0	—		0	0
Career total			53	0	10	0	0	0	63	0
