= Malemngamba Meitei =

Indian footballer

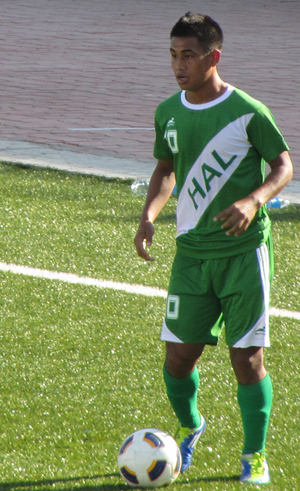

Personal information
- Full name: Malemganba Meitei Kshetrimayum
- Date of birth: 5 January 1992 (age 34)
- Place of birth: Yairipok, Manipur
- Position: Midfielder

Youth career
- 2007–2008: NEROCA FC

Senior career*
Years	Team	Apps	(Gls)
2008	NEROCA FC		
2009	NISA		
2010–2012	HAL		
2012–2013	Salgaocar	0	(0)
2013–2015	Bengaluru FC	9	(0)
2015–2016	Mumbai	4	(0)
2016–2017	NEROCA FC	14	(3)
2017–2018	NorthEast United	7	(0)
2018	→TRAU (loan)	0	(0)
2018–2019	NEROCA FC	19	(1)
2019–2021	Gokulam Kerala	5	(0)
- * Club domestic league appearances and goals

Malemnganba Meitei Kshetrimayum (Meitei: Kshetrimayum Malemnganba Meitei, born 5 January 1992) is an Indian professional footballer who last played as a midfielder for Gokulam Kerala in the I-League.

== Career ==
=== Early career ===
Born in Yairipok, Manipur, Meetei started playing football from the age of seven years after watching the Brazil national team during the 1998 FIFA World Cup. After having participated in many camps and development programs, Meetei began playing for NEROCA FC in 2007. While with NEROCA Meetei played in the Manipur State League, which was the top-tier league for football in Manipur. He then signed for the North Imphal Sporting Association (NISA) in 2009 who were the reigning Manipur league winners and participants in the I-League 2nd Division.

After playing the final rounds of the 2nd Division in Bangalore, Meetei was signed by newly promoted HAL SC for the new I-League season. Two seasons later, after the club were relegated, Meetei signed for former I-League champions, Salgaocar, for the 2012–13 season.

=== Bengaluru FC ===
After spending one season at Salgaocar, he played for Bengaluru FC for two years from 2013 to 2014 and 2014–2015 season. During his two-year tenure at the club, Bangaluru Fc won I-League in the debut season and Federation cup in the 2nd season. He made his debut for the side in the club's first ever I-League match against Mohun Bagan A.C. in which he started and played 80 minutes before being replaced by Robin Singh as Bengaluru drew the match 1–1. After the 2014–15 season, Meetei was released by the club. After his release, Meitei was listed as being eligible to be picked in the 2015 ISL Domestic Draft.

=== Mumbai FC ===
After playing for two years at Bangaluru FC, Meetei signed for Mumbai and played for them in the Mumbai Football League and subsequently 2015–16 I-League.

=== NEROCA F.C. ===
He recently played for NEROCA FC of Manipur (2016–2017) which became the first club from Manipur to be crowned winner of 2nd Division I-League after defeating Lonestar Kashmir 4–1 with a game in hand against Southern Samity FC.

=== NorthEast United ===
He is currently playing for NorthEast United in the Indian Super League for season 2017–18. He was picked by NorthEast United in the ISL Domestic Draft at a price cap of ₹16 lakhs.

== Career statistics ==
As of 23 April 2017

Club	Season	League		Federation Cup		Durand Cup		AFC		Total	
Club	Season	Apps	Goals	Apps	Goals	Apps	Goals	Apps	Goals	Apps	Goals
Salgaocar	2012–13	0	0	0	0	0	0	0	0	0	0
Bengaluru FC	2013–14	7	0	0	0	0	0	0	0	7	0
Bengaluru FC	2014–15	2	0	0	0	0	0	2	0	4	0
Mumbai	2015–16	4	0	0	0	0	0	0	0	4	0
NEROCA FC	2016–17	14	3	0	0	0	0	0	0	14	3
NorthEast United	2017–18	7	0	0	0	0	0	0	0	7	0
NEROCA FC	2018–19	19	1	0	0	0	0	0	0	19	1
Gokulam Kerala	2019–20	5	0	0	0	4	0	0	0	9	0
Career total		58	4	0	0	4	0	2	0	64	4

== Honours ==
Gokulam Kerala

- Durand Cup: 2019
