= 2017–18 Mumbai City FC season =

2017–18 football season for Mumbai City Football Club

Mumbai City FC
2017–18 season
- Owner: Ranbir Kapoor; Bimal Parekh
- Manager: Alexandre Guimarães
- Stadium: Mumbai Football Arena
- ISL: 7th
- Super Cup: Round of 16
- Top goalscorer: League: Éverton Santos (7 goals); All: Éverton Santos (8 goals)
- Highest home attendance: 8,597 vs Kerala Blasters (14 January 2018)
- Lowest home attendance: 4,222 vs NorthEast United (22 February 2018)
- Average home league attendance: 6,449
Home colours	Away colours
- All statistics correct as of 3 March 2018.

The 2017–18 Mumbai City FC season was the club's fourth season since its establishment in 2014 and their fourth season in the Indian Super League.

== Background ==
Mumbai City FC finished first in the standings at the end of the 2016 ISL league stage, thus qualifying for the semifinals for the very first time led by Diego Forlán who was their marquee player. However they lost in the semifinals to Atlético de Kolkata 3–2 on aggregate. Coach Alexandre Guimarães was thus retained for his 2nd term in-charge as the head coach of the club.

== Transfers ==
Due to the Indian Super League regulation each club was allowed to retain a maximum of two Indian players over the age of twenty-one (21) from previous squad. On 1 July, Mumbai City announced they are retaining goalkeeper Amrinder Singh. Franchise announced retention of defensive midfielder Sehnaj Singh on 7 July. It was officially announced on 24 July that midfielder Rakesh Oram was retained by Mumbai City as U21 player.

In ISL players draft held on 23 July 2017, Mumbai City picked defender Aiborlang Khongjee who was loaned out to the franchise by Shillong Lajong in previous season. Mumbai City added eleven new players from draft, goalkeeper Arindam Bhattacharya and Kunal Sawant, defender Biswajit Saha, Mehrajuddin Wadoo and Lalchhawnkima, midfielder Abhinas Ruidas, Sahil Tavora, Sanju Pradhan and Zakeer Mundampara and forward Balwant Singh and Pranjal Bhumij. Defender Raju Gaikwad made his return who was previously part of Mumbai City squad in 2014 season.

Four players from Mumbai City were signed by other franchises in the draft. Goalkeeper Albino Gomes and left back Sena Ralte were signed by Delhi Dynamos. Right back Ashutosh Mehta was signed by ATK. Right winger Jackichand Singh was signed by Kerala Blasters.

Mumbai City announced re-signing of Romanian central back Lucian Goian on 26 July. Retention of Brazilian central back Gerson Vieira was announced on 27 July. On 3 August, franchise announced signing of Brazilian forward Éverton Santos. On 4 August, Mumbai City announced signing of Spanish striker Rafa Jordà. Retention of Brazilian midfielder Léo Costa was announced on 7 August. On 8 August, signing of Brazilian central back Márcio Rosário was announced. Signing of Indian U23 international Davinder Singh was announced on 17 August by the franchise. Mumbai City announced signing of Cameroonian midfielder Achille Emaná on 31 August 2017. On 3 September, Mumbai City announced signing of Brazilian midfielder Thiago Santos on a season long deal from Flamengo.

On 15 February 2018, the club announced that Lalchhawnkima will be joining Aizawl for the remainder of the season on loan.

=== In ===
Pos.	Player	Previous club	Date	Ref
FW	(India) Balwant Singh	Mohun Bagan	23 July 2017	
GK	(India) Arindam Bhattacharya	FC Pune City	23 July 2017	
DF	(India) Raju Gaikwad	Mohun Bagan	23 July 2017	
MF	(India) Abhinas Ruidas	East Bengal	23 July 2017	
MF	(India) Sahil Tavora	Goa	23 July 2017	
DF	(India) Aiborlang Khongjee	Shillong Lajong	23 July 2017	
MF	(India) Sanju Pradhan	NorthEast United	23 July 2017	
MF	(India) Zakeer Mundampara	Chennaiyin	23 July 2017	
DF	(India) Biswajit Saha	Sporting Goa	23 July 2017	
FW	(India) Pranjal Bhumij	DSK Shivajians	23 July 2017	
DF	(India) Mehrajuddin Wadoo	Sporting Goa	23 July 2017	
GK	(India) Kunal Sawant	Kerala Blasters	23 July 2017	
DF	(India) Lalchhawnkima	Mumbai	23 July 2017	
DF	(Romania) Lucian Goian	(Australia) Perth Glory	26 July 2017	
DF	(Brazil) Gerson Vieira	(Brazil) Tubarão	27 July 2017	
FW	(Brazil) Éverton Santos	(Brazil) Santa Cruz	3 August 2017	
FW	(Spain) Rafa Jordà	(Spain) Llagostera	4 August 2017	
MF	(Brazil) Léo Costa	(Brazil) Santa Cruz	7 August 2017	
DF	(Brazil) Márcio Rosário	(Indonesia) Persela Lamongan	8 August 2017	
DF	(India) Davinder Singh	Minerva Punjab	17 August 2017	
MF	(Cameroon) Achille Emaná	(Spain) Gimnàstic	31 August 2017	

=== Out ===
Pos.	Player	New Club	Date	Ref
DF	(Brazil) Gerson Vieira	(Brazil) Tubarão	1 January 2017	
GK	(Brazil) Roberto Volpato	Released	1 January 2017	
FW	(Uruguay) Diego Forlán	Released	1 January 2017	
MF	(India) David Lalrinmuana	East Bengal	1 January 2017	
FW	(Brazil) Thiago Cunha	(Brazil) Londrina	5 January 2017	
MF	(Hungary) Krisztián Vadócz	(Hong Kong) Kitchee	11 January 2017	
MF	(Brazil) Léo Costa	(Brazil) Santa Cruz	23 January 2017	
MF	(Argentina) Matías Defederico	(Ecuador) Universidad Católica	24 January 2017	
DF	(Romania) Lucian Goian	(Australia) Perth Glory	21 March 2017	
GK	(India) Albino Gomes	Delhi Dynamos	23 July 2017	
DF	(India) Ashutosh Mehta	ATK	23 July 2017	
MF	(India) Boithang Haokip	Bengaluru	23 July 2017	
MF	(India) Jackichand Singh	Kerala Blasters	23 July 2017	

=== Loan in ===
Pos.	Name	From	Date from	Date to	Ref
MF	(Brazil) Thiago Santos	(Brazil) Flamengo	3 September 2017	31 July 2018	

=== Loan out ===
Pos.	Name	From	Date from	Date to	Ref
DF	(India) Lalchhawnkima	Aizawl	15 February 2018	31 July 2018	

== First team ==
As of 23 October 2017.

Squad No.	Name	Nationality	Position(s)	Date of birth (age)
Goalkeepers
1	Amrinder Singh	(India)	GK	27 May 1993 (age 33)
23	Kunal Sawant	(India)	GK	23 August 1986 (age 40)
27	Arindam Bhattacharya	(India)	GK	20 May 1989 (age 37)
Defenders
2	Aiborlang Khongjee	(India)	RB/CB	9 December 1987 (age 38)
3	Márcio Rosário	(Brazil)	CB	21 November 1983 (age 42)
4	Gerson Vieira	(Brazil)	CB	4 October 1992 (age 34)
6	Raju Gaikwad	(India)	RB	25 September 1990 (age 36)
16	Biswajit Saha	(India)	LB	15 December 1987 (age 38)
18	Lucian Goian	(Romania)	CB	10 February 1983 (age 43)
26	Mehrajuddin Wadoo	(India)	RB	12 February 1984 (age 42)
31	Lalchhawnkima	(India)	RB	31 May 1991 (age 35)
32	Davinder Singh	(India)	CB	1 January 1997 (age 29)
Midfielders
8	Sahil Tavora	(India)	CM/AM	19 October 1995 (age 31)
10	Achille Emaná	(Cameroon)	AM	5 June 1982 (age 44)
11	Léo Costa	(Brazil)	CM/AM	3 March 1986 (age 40)
12	Sanju Pradhan	(India)	RW	15 August 1989 (age 37)
22	Zakeer Mundampara	(India)	CM	9 November 1992 (age 34)
28	Sehnaj Singh	(India)	DM/RB	29 July 1993 (age 33)
33	Rakesh Oram	(India)	CM/RW	31 October 1997 (age 29)
34	Abhinas Ruidas	(India)	LW	12 September 1995 (age 31)
40	Thiago Santos	(Brazil)	AM	12 April 1995 (age 31)
Strikers
7	Éverton Santos	(Brazil)	FW/RW/LW	14 October 1986 (age 40)
9	Rafa Jordà	(Spain)	FW	14 October 1986 (age 40)
15	Balwant Singh	(India)	FW/RW/LW	15 December 1986 (age 39)
25	Pranjal Bhumij	(India)	FW/AM/RW/LW	2 March 1999 (age 27)

== Pre-season and friendlies ==
Mumbai City FC arranged a 10-day pre-season training camp in Pune where they used the facilities of DSK Shivajians before flying off to Valencia, Spain for rest of the preseason. In Spain, Mumbai City FC played friendly against Spanish third division sides UE Gandía, CD Castellón, CD Alcoyano, UD Alzira, Levante UD B, Elche CF B and Torre Levante CF.

12 October 2017 Friendly	Mumbai City FC	3–0	UE Gandía	Valencia, Spain
12:00 CET	Costa 28'; Jordà 30', 43'	Report		Stadium: Oliva Nova Resort

15 October 2017 Friendly	CD Castellón	1–2	Mumbai City FC	Valencia, Spain
18:00 CET	Rubén Fonte 62'	Report	Emaná 58'; T. Santos 80'	Stadium: Nou Estadi Castàlia; Referee: Enrique Lluna Olarte

18 October 2017 Friendly	Mumbai City FC	0–0	CD Alcoyano	Valencia, Spain
15:00 CET		Report		Stadium: Oliva Nova Sports Center

20 October 2017 Friendly	Mumbai City FC	3–1	UD Alzira	Valencia, Spain
16:00 CET	B. Singh 15', 59'; Pradhan 36'	Report	Cristian Herrera 54' (pen.)	Stadium: Oliva Nova Sports Center

27 October 2017 Friendly	Mumbai City FC	2–2	Levante UD B	Valencia, Spain
12:00 CET	Vieira 28'; Thiago Santos 66'	Report	Joel Rodríguez 1'; Hacen 31'	Stadium: Oliva Nova Sports Center

31 October 2017 Friendly	Mumbai City FC	1–2	Elche CF B	Valencia, Spain
14:00 CET	Eduardo Latorre 28' (o.g.)	Report	Nacho Ramón 36'; Georgi Rusev 86' (pen.)	Stadium: Oliva Nova Sports Center

3 November 2017 Friendly	Mumbai City FC	1–0	Torre Levante CF	Valencia, Spain
11:30 CET	Everton Santos 6'	Report		Stadium: Oliva Nova Sports Center

== Competitions ==
=== Indian Super League ===
==== Summary ====
===== November =====
Mumbai City started their season against ISL debutants Bengaluru on 19 November 2017 in their first away game of the season at the Sree Kanteerava Stadium in Bengaluru. The game began with a lot of physicality from both teams with tackles flying in from both sides. As the match progressed, Bengaluru started showing more flair and came close to opening their account thrice in the span of six minutes. Bengaluru kept seeing more of the ball and while there were a lot of moves that could have potentially ended up in goal, the final pass in the attacking-third seemed to let them down. Consequently, the sides went into the break with the score-line goalless. In the second half, Bengaluru scored their first goal in ISL, courtesy a short corner routine, when Edu García drilled one past former BFC man Amrinder Singh at the near post at the 67th minute. A defensive mix up between Wadoo and Amrinder in added time meant that Chhetri could get his name on the scoresheet and sealed a 2–0 victory for Bengaluru. Mumbai City got their campaign up and running in their first home game of the season with a narrow 2-1 win over Goa at the Mumbai Football Arena on 25 November 2017. Everton Santos made the most of a lapse by Laxmikant Kattimani to open the scoring, while Manuel Arana came up with the equaliser for Goa four minutes before Thiago Santos came in from the right flank and squeezed the ball through Kattimani's legs to score the winner for the Islanders. Mumbai City next faced Pune City in the first 'Maha' derby of the season on 29 November 2017. Pune City used their South American connection to good effect to come from behind and edge Mumbai City FC 2-1 at the Shree Shiv Chhatrapati Sports Complex in Pune. Uruguayan Emiliano Alfaro bagged a brace in the second half after the home team had gone behind from a sublime Balwant Singh strike in the first.

===== December =====
Mumbai City started the month with an away encounter against previous season runners up Kerala Blasters on 3 December 2017. Mark Sifneos’ goal in the first half, which was also Kerala's first of the season, was cancelled out by Balwant Singh's strike in the second. C.K. Vineeth was booked a second time in the 90th minute following a tussle with Balwant, and was consequently given his marching orders. The match ended in a 1–1 draw. After a poor start to the season with 1 win, 1 draw and 2 losses, Mumbai City next faced Chennaiyin, who were on a 3 match winning run on 10 December 2017. Mumbai were awarded a penalty after Balwant Singh was brought down in the box. Emana stepped up to the spot and slotted the ball into the bottom left corner to make it 1-0 for the Islanders, thus scoring the only goal of the game and breaking Chennaiyin's winning streak and securing their 2nd win of the season. Mumbai City then hosted previous seasons' champion ATK on 17 December, who were still winless this season. Amrinder made a couple of good saves to deny ATK a goal. His and Mumbai's resistance finally came to an end in the 54th minute when Zequinha hit a shot with the outside of his right foot from the left flank. The keeper was unsighted by Robin, who got a slight touch on the ball to help it through Amrinder's legs and into the net. Mumbai then won an away game against NorthEast United on 20 December, after Balwant scored a brace by scoring on either sides of half-time to ensure a 2-0 win for the Islanders. In their last game of the year 2017, Mumbai City routed Delhi Dynamos, courtesy a 4–0 scoreline at the Mumbai Football Arena. Lucian Goian and Everton Santos struck in the first half to give Mumbai City a 2 goal cushion. The half, however, ended on a sour note as a tussle between Mumbai's Sehnaj Singh and Delhi's Mirabaje earned both a straight red. The second half started with 20 players on the pitch, and it took only four minutes for the home team to score their third. Eleven minutes from time, Emana found Balwant with a lovely chip, who chested the ball down and hit a scuffed shot off his calf, that wrong-footed Arnab to roll over the goal-line, thus adding a fourth goal to Delhi's misery.

===== January =====
Mumbai started the year with an away draw against Jamshedpur. A brace from Thiago Santos ensured that Mumbai will end the first part of their season on the fourth place. Though Mumbai had a good first half of the season, they were not able to replicate that form in the second half of the season after they suffered consecutive defeats against Kerala Balsters and Bengaluru. The only win in the month came against a 10-man Goa, when Balwant scored an all-important 4th goal in the 86th minute in a 7-goal thriller.

===== February =====
Like previous months of the season, Mumbai were not able to win the opening encounter of the month, as they lost 2–1 to the ISL debutants Jamshedpur in a home encounter. They then lost their 2nd 'Maha' derby of the season when Diego Carlos and Marcelinho scored a goal in each half to end the match with a 2-0 scoreline. With thi defeat Mumbai's poor run at home continued with their fourth home loss on the trot. As things stood Mumbai needed a string of wins in the remainder of the league season. Mumbai then recorded 2 consecutive wins in the league when they defeated ATK away and NorthEast United on home, courtesy of a late Goian winner, thus keeping their playoff hopes alive. With two games in hand, Mumbai needed victories in both to stand a chance of making the playoffs. They played their next match against bottom placed Delhi Dynamos. Delhi started with a barrage of attacks and took the lead from a simple build-up play as early as in the sixth minute. Mumbai then tried to surge forward in search of the equaliser and got themselves a free-kick on the half-hour mark from just outside the box. Emana stepped up to take it, but his effort deflected off the wall and just over the target for a corner. At half time the scoreline read 1-0 in favour of Delhi. Mumbai started strong in the second half after they equalised just four minutes following the restart. Balwant received the ball on the left side, cut in and fired on goal. Xabi Irureta got down to make the save, but the rebound fell straight to Everton, who pounced to slot it home. Delhi then racked up 4 goals in the last quarter of an hour to play. Chhangte rounded off Amrinder and scored into an empty net. Mumbai could not make the playoffs with the 5-1 rout.

===== March =====
Mumbai then played their last match of the season against an already qualified Chennaiyin. The match ended 1–0 in favour of Chennaiyin.

==== Matches ====
19 November 2017 1	Bengaluru	2–0	Mumbai City	Bengaluru
20:00 IST	Edu 67'; Chhetri (yellow card) 83' (goal) 90+3'	Report	Gerson (yellow card) 15'	Stadium: Sree Kanteerava Stadium; Attendance: 17,796; Referee: Aurélien Juenkou; Man of the Match: Sunil Chhetri (Bengaluru FC)

25 November 2017 2	Mumbai City	2–1	Goa	Andheri, Mumbai
20:00 IST	S. Singh (yellow card) 27'; Rosário (yellow card) 35'; E. Santos 60'; T. Santos 88'; Vieira (yellow card) 90'	Report	Das (yellow card) 24'; C. Singh (yellow card) 61'; Arana 83'	Stadium: Mumbai Football Arena; Attendance: 6,212; Referee: Aurélien Juenkou; Man of the Match: Everton Santos (Mumbai City)

29 November 2017 3	Pune City	2–1	Mumbai City	Pune
20:00 IST	Tébar (yellow card) 46'; Alfaro 74' (pen.), 90'	Report	B. Singh 15'; S. Singh (yellow card) 45+3'	Stadium: Shree Shiv Chhatrapati Sports Complex; Attendance: 8,211; Referee: Raktim Shah; Man of the Match: Gerson Vieira (Mumbai City)

3 December 2017 4	Kerala Blasters	1–1	Mumbai City	Kochi
20:00 IST	Sifneos 14'; Lakić-Pešić (yellow card) 24'; Vineeth (yellow card) 80' (yellow-red card) 89'; P. Singh (yellow card) 86'	Report	D. Singh (yellow card) 86'; B. Singh 77'; Ruidas (yellow card) 88'	Stadium: Jawaharlal Nehru Stadium; Attendance: 35,392; Referee: R. Venkatesh; Man of the Match: Balwant Singh (Mumbai City)

10 December 2017 5	Mumbai City	1–0	Chennaiyin	Andheri, Mumbai
20:00 IST	D. Singh (yellow card) 6'; Goian (yellow card) 19'; Ruidas (yellow card) 53'; Emaná 60' (pen.); S. Singh (yellow card) 70'	Report	Calderón (yellow card) 35'; Maílson (yellow card) 59'	Stadium: Mumbai Football Arena; Attendance: 7,112; Referee: Ranjit Bakshi; Man of the Match: Achille Emaná (Mumbai City)

17 December 2017 6	Mumbai City	0–1	ATK	Andheri, Mumbai
20:00 IST	Ruidas (yellow card) 19'; S. Singh (yellow card) 51'; Goian (yellow card) 70'; Emaná (yellow card) 75'	Report	Nongrum (yellow card) 31'; Taylor (yellow card) 68'; R. Singh 54'; Majumder (yellow card) 89'; Mehta (yellow card) 90+1'	Stadium: Mumbai Football Arena; Attendance: 8,403; Referee: R. Venkatesh; Man of the Match: Zequinha (ATK)

20 December 2017 7	NorthEast United	0–2	Mumbai City	Guwahati
20:00 IST	Doungel (yellow card) 69'; Gonçalves (yellow card) 69'	Report	B. Singh 34', 68' (yellow card) 36'; Mundampara (yellow card) 79'	Stadium: Indira Gandhi Athletic Stadium; Attendance: 10,353; Referee: Santhosh Kumar; Man of the Match: Gerson Vieira (Mumbai City)

29 December 2017 8	Mumbai City	4–0	Delhi Dynamos	Andheri, Mumbai
20:00 IST	Goian 12'; E. Santos 43', 49'; S. Singh (red card) 45+2'; Emaná 54'; B. Singh 79'	Report	Mirabaje (red card) 45+2'; Edu Moya (yellow card) 90+1'	Stadium: Mumbai Football Arena; Attendance: 6,129; Referee: Raul Gupta; Man of the Match: Éverton Santos (Mumbai City)

5 January 2018 9	Jamshedpur	2–2	Mumbai City	Jamshedpur
20:00 IST	Azuka 43', 45+1'; Hossain (yellow card) 66'	Report	T. Santos 24', 71'; B. Singh (yellow card) 90+5'	Stadium: JRD Tata Sports Complex; Attendance: 21,350; Referee: Arumughan Rowan; Man of the Match: Izu Azuka (Jamshedpur)

14 January 2018 10	Mumbai City	0–1	Kerala Blasters	Andheri, Mumbai
20:00 IST	Bhumij (yellow card) 90+1'	Report	Hume 23'; Chowdhury (yellow card) 45+1'; Lalruatthara (yellow card) 61'	Stadium: Mumbai Football Arena; Attendance: 8,597; Referee: Pranjal Banerjee; Man of the Match: Iain Hume (Kerala Blasters)

18 January 2018 11	Mumbai City	1–3	Bengaluru	Andheri, Mumbai
20:00 IST	B. Singh (yellow card) 38'; A. Singh (yellow card) 42'; D. Singh (yellow card) 45+3'; Léo Costa 76'	Report	Paartalu (yellow card) 40'; Chhetri 43' (pen.), 52'; Miku 63'	Stadium: Mumbai Football Arena; Attendance: 6,059; Referee: Santhosh Kumar; Man of the Match: Sunil Chhetri (Bengaluru)

28 January 2018 12	Goa	3–4	Mumbai City	Goa
17:30 IST	S. Fernandes (yellow card) 31' (yellow-red card) 48'; Coro 34', 78'; Lanzarote 45+1' (yellow card) 72'; B. Fernandes (yellow card) 88'; Dessai (yellow card) 90+5'	Report	E. Santos 36'; Emaná 54' (pen.); Tavora (yellow card) 62'; Rosário (yellow card) 66'; T. Santos 70' (yellow card) 89'; A. Singh (yellow card) 76'; S. Singh (yellow card) 81'; B. Singh 86'; Rafa Jordà (yellow card) 90+7'	Stadium: Fatorda Stadium; Attendance: 17,812; Referee: C. R. Srikrishna; Man of the Match: Thiago Santos (Mumbai City)

1 February 2018 13	Mumbai City	1–2	Jamshedpur	Andheri, Mumbai
20:00 IST	E. Santos 79'	Report	Chakrabarti (yellow card) 30'; Pradhan 37' (o.g.); Jairu 84'; Bikey (yellow card) 90+3'	Stadium: Mumbai Football Arena; Attendance: 5,138; Referee: Arumughan Rowan; Man of the Match: Subrata Pal (Jamshedpur)

11 February 2018 14	Mumbai City	0–2	Pune City	Andheri, Mumbai
17:30 IST		Report	Diego Carlos 18'; Stanković (yellow card) 40'; Golui (yellow card) 62'; Marcelinho 83'	Stadium: Mumbai Football Arena; Attendance: 6,167; Referee: Raktim Shah; Man of the Match: Marcos Tébar (Pune City)

18 February 2018 15	ATK	1–2	Mumbai City	Kolkata
20:00 IST	Taylor (yellow card) 44'; B. Singh 47'; Figueras (yellow card) 84'	Report	Rosário 32'; S. Singh (yellow card) 40'; Emaná (yellow card) 44'; Rafa Jordà 53'; B. Singh (yellow card) 84'	Stadium: Salt Lake Stadium; Attendance: 4,621; Referee: Santhosh Kumar; Man of the Match: Márcio Rosário (Mumbai City)

22 February 2018 16	Mumbai City	3–2	NorthEast United	Andheri, Mumbai
20:00 IST	Emaná 15'; Goian (yellow card) 35' (goal) 90+1'; E. Santos 54'	Report	Goian 24' (o.g.); Gill (yellow card) 27'; Sambinha 43'; R. Singh (yellow card) 83'; Borges (yellow card) 89'; Doungel (yellow card) 90+5'	Stadium: Mumbai Football Arena; Attendance: 4,222; Referee: Raul Gupta; Man of the Match: Éverton Santos (Mumbai City)

27 February 2018 17	Delhi Dynamos	5–1	Mumbai City	Delhi
20:00 IST	Kumar 5'; Ngaihte (yellow card) 16'; Chowdhary (yellow card) 29' (yellow-red card) 77'; Mirabaje 73'; Arana 81' (pen.); Uche 84'; Chhangte 90+1'	Report	E. Santos 49'; Tavora (yellow card) 59' (yellow-red card) 80'	Stadium: Jawaharlal Nehru Stadium; Referee: Raktim Shah; Man of the Match: Matías Mirabaje (Delhi Dynamos)

3 March 2018 18	Chennaiyin	1–0	Mumbai City	Chennai
20:00 IST	Mihelič 67' (pen.); G. Singh (yellow card) 90+2'	Report	Mundampara (yellow card) 19'; Léo Costa 22'; S. Singh (yellow card) 83'	Stadium: Jawaharlal Nehru Stadium; Attendance: 12,733; Referee: Arumughan Rowan; Man of the Match: Jaime Gavilán (Chennaiyin)

==== Table ====
Pos	Team	Pld	W	D	L	GF	GA	GD	Pts
5	Jamshedpur	18	7	5	6	16	18	−2	26
6	Kerala Blasters	18	6	7	5	20	22	−2	25
7	Mumbai City	18	7	2	9	25	29	−4	23
8	Delhi Dynamos	18	5	4	9	27	37	−10	19
9	ATK	18	4	4	10	16	30	−14	16

Source: Indian Super League
Rules for classification: 1) points; 2) head-to-head points; 3) head-to-head goal difference; 4) head-to-head goals scored; 5) goal difference; 5) number of goals scored; 6) fair play ranking; 6) drawing of lots

==== Results summary ====
Overall								Home						Away					
Pld	W	D	L	GF	GA	GD	Pts	W	D	L	GF	GA	GD	W	D	L	GF	GA	GD
18	7	2	9	25	29	−4	23	4	0	5	12	12	0	3	2	4	13	17	−4

==== Results by matchday ====
Round	1	2	3	4	5	6	7	8	9	10	11	12	13	14	15	16	17	18
Ground	A	H	A	A	H	H	A	H	A	H	H	A	H	H	A	H	A	A
Result	L	W	L	D	W	L	W	W	D	L	L	W	L	L	W	W	L	L
Position	10	5	7	6	5	4	3	4	5	5	6	6	7	7	7	6	7	7

Source: Matches
A = Away; H = Home; W = Win; D = Draw; L = Loss

=== Super Cup ===
==== Qualification round ====
As one of the bottom four teams in Indian Super League, Mumbai City entered the Super Cup in the qualifier round where they faced Indian Arrows for a spot in the Round of 16. The match began with Mumbai on the front foot as expected. Leo Costa and Balwant Singh had early opportunities, while Everton came the nearest to scoring when his powerful shot from distance rebounded off the far post. In the second half, the Arrows kept thronging Mumbai's box with well-strung passes and eventually got rewarded in the 77th minute, when Rahul scored an amazing opener. He brilliantly dinked the ball over Goian, raced past him and lodged the ball past Amrinder to take the lead. However, on the 90th minute mark, they ended up giving away a penalty to Mumbai when Rai brought Everton down in the box and Emana made no mistake to convert it from the spot. That proved to be the last piece of action from regulation time as the match entered extra-time. In the first period of the extra time Everton then gave Mumbai the lead with a powerful shot from the edge of the box to enter the last 15 minutes with a one-goal advantage. With that, Mumbai sealed their berth in the pre-quarter finals by winning the match 2–1.

==== Round of 16 ====
In the round of 16, Mumbai City will meet I-League side, East Bengal F.C.

16 March 2018 Qualification round	Mumbai City	2–1 (a.e.t.)	Indian Arrows	Bhubaneswar
17:00 IST	Emaná 90+1' (pen.); E.Santos 104'	Report	Jadhav (yellow card) 68'; Rai (yellow card) 71'; Praveen 77'; Thangjam (yellow card) 89'	Stadium: Kalinga Stadium; Referee: Ajitkumar Lairenlakpam

5 April 2018 Round of 16	East Bengal	2–1	Mumbai City	Bhubaneswar
17:00 IST	Yusa 26'; Amnah 73'	Report	Emaná 22'	Stadium: Kalinga Stadium

== Player statistics ==
As of 16 March 2018

List of squad players, including number of appearances by competition

No.	Pos	Nat	Player	Total		Indian Super League		Super Cup	
No.	Pos	Nat	Player	Apps	Goals	Apps	Goals	Apps	Goals
1	GK	(India) IND	Amrinder Singh	17	0	16	0	1	0
23	GK	(India) IND	Kunal Sawant	0	0	0	0	0	0
27	GK	(India) IND	Arindam Bhattacharya	2	0	2	0	0	0
2	DF	(India) IND	Aiborlang Khongjee	0	0	0	0	0	0
3	DF	(Brazil) BRA	Márcio Rosário	16	1	10+5	1	1	0
4	DF	(Brazil) BRA	Gerson Vieira	17	0	17	0	0	0
6	DF	(India) IND	Raju Gaikwad	16	0	13+2	0	1	0
16	DF	(India) IND	Biswajit Saha	0	0	0	0	0	0
18	DF	(Romania) ROU	Lucian Goian	16	2	14+1	2	1	0
26	DF	(India) IND	Mehrajuddin Wadoo	14	0	9+5	0	0	0
32	DF	(India) IND	Davinder Singh	4	4	4	4	0	0
8	MF	(India) IND	Sahil Tavora	9	0	7+1	0	1	0
10	MF	(Cameroon) CMR	Achille Emaná	19	4	16+2	3	1	1
11	MF	(Brazil) BRA	Léo Costa	10	1	2+7	1	1	0
12	MF	(India) IND	Sanju Pradhan	18	0	14+3	0	1	0
22	MF	(India) IND	Zakeer Mundampara	10	0	6+3	0	0+1	0
28	MF	(India) IND	Sehnaj Singh	14	0	11+2	0	1	0
34	MF	(India) IND	Abhinas Ruidas	13	0	11+1	0	0+1	0
7	FW	(Brazil) BRA	Éverton Santos	19	8	18	7	1	1
9	FW	(Spain) ESP	Rafa Jordà	11	1	5+6	1	0	0
15	FW	(India) IND	Balwant Singh	17	6	15+1	6	1	0
17	FW	(India) IND	Pranjal Bhumij	7	0	0+6	0	0+1	0
33	FW	(India) IND	Rakesh Oram	0	0	0	0	0	0
40	FW	(Brazil) BRA	Thiago Santos	13	4	8+5	4	0	0

=== Top scorers ===
Rank	No.	Pos	Nat	Player	ISL	Super Cup	Total
1	7	FW	(Brazil)	Éverton Santos	7	1	8
2	15	FW	(India)	Balwant Singh	6	0	6
3	10	FW	(Cameroon)	Achille Emaná	3	1	4
3	40	FW	(Brazil)	Thiago Santos	4	0	4
5	18	DF	(Romania)	Lucian Goian	2	0	2
6	3	DF	(Brazil)	Márcio Rosário	1	0	1
6	9	DF	(Spain)	Rafa Jordà	1	0	1
6	11	MF	(Brazil)	Léo Costa	1	0	1

Source: soccerway
Updated: 16 March 2018

=== Clean sheets ===
Rank	No.	Pos	Nat	Player	ISL	Super Cup	Total
1	1	GK	(India)	Amrinder Singh	2	0	2
2	27	GK	(India)	Arindam Bhattacharya	1	0	1

Source: soccerway
Updated: 16 March 2018

=== Disciplinary record ===
Rank	No.	Pos	Nat	Player	ISL		Super Cup		Total		Notes
Rank	No.	Pos	Nat	Player	Yellow card	Red card	Yellow card	Red card	Yellow card	Red card	Notes
1	28	MF	(India)	Sehnaj Singh	7	1	0	0	7	1	Missed a game, against NorthEast United (4 yellow cards) (20 December 2017); Suspended for 2 games (red card) (January 2018)
2	15	FW	(India)	Balwant Singh	4	0	0	0	4	0	Missed a game, against NorthEast United (4 yellow cards) (22 February 2018)
3	3	DF	(Brazil)	Márcio Rosário	3	0	0	0	3	0	
3	10	FW	(Cameroon)	Achille Emaná	3	0	0	0	3	0	
3	18	DF	(Romania)	Lucian Goian	3	0	0	0	3	0	
3	32	DF	(India)	Davinder Singh	3	0	0	0	3	0	
3	34	DF	(India)	Abhinas Ruidas	3	0	0	0	3	0	
8	1	GK	(India)	Amrinder Singh	2	0	0	0	2	0	
8	4	DF	(Brazil)	Gerson Vieira	2	0	0	0	2	0	
8	22	MF	(India)	Zakeer Mundampara	2	0	0	0	2	0	
11	8	MF	(India)	Sahil Tavora	1	1	0	0	1	1	Missed a game, against Chennaiyin FC (red card) (3 March 2018)
12	9	FW	(Spain)	Rafa Jordà	1	0	0	0	1	0	
12	11	MF	(Brazil)	Léo Costa	1	0	0	0	1	0	
12	17	FW	(India)	Pranjal Bhumij	1	0	0	0	1	0	
12	40	FW	(Brazil)	Thiago Santos	1	0	0	0	1	0	

Source: soccerway
Updated: 16 March 2018

== See also ==
- 2017–18 in Indian football
- 2017–18 Indian Super League
