= 2016 Mumbai City FC season =

2016 football season for Mumbai City Football Club

Mumbai City FC
2015–16 season
- Owner: Ranbir Kapoor,Bimal Parekh
- Manager: (Costa Rica) Alexandre Guimarães
- Stadium: Mumbai Football Arena
- Indian Super League: champions
- Top goalscorer: (Uruguay) Diego Forlán (6 goals)
- Highest home attendance: 7,690 vs Delhi Dynamos FC (3 December 2016)
- Lowest home attendance: 6147 vs NorthEast United FC (7 October 2016)
- Average home league attendance: 7354
| Home colours | Away colours |

The 2016 Mumbai City FC season was the club's third season since its establishment in 2014 and their third season in the Indian Super League, their most successful till date. This season was also the first in which the club was coached by the Costarican Alexandre Guimarães, replacing Nicolas Anelka who served as player-coach the previous season. They finished first in the standings after the ending of the league season, qualifying for the semifinals for the very first time led by Diego Forlán who was their marquee player. However they lost in the semifinals to Atletico de Kolkata 1-5 on aggregate.

== Background ==
After the end of the 2014 ISL season, Mumbai City parted ways with their inaugural season head coach, Peter Reid. Soon after, Nicolas Anelka, the club's marquee from 2014, was named as the player-head coach for the 2015 season. The season began for Mumbai City with a 3–1 loss to their Maharashtra rivals, Pune City on 5 October. The team ended the season with only four wins through fourteen matches, three of which came in a row at the end of October. This resulted in Mumbai City finishing the season in sixth place in the standings, missing out on the finals by six points.

== Player movement ==
Foreign players

| Position | Player |
|---|---|
| MF | (Haiti) Sony Norde |

Indian players

To be Announced

=== Signings ===
| Position | Player | Old club | Date | Ref |
|---|---|---|---|---|
| FW | (Argentina) Matías Defederico | (Chile) San Marcos de Arica | 15 June 2016 | |
| DF | (India) Aiborlang Khongjee | (India) Shillong Lajong | 21 June 2016 | |
| MF | (India) Boithang Haokip | (India) Shillong Lajong | 21 June 2016 | |
| FW | (India) Jackichand Singh | (India) Pune City | 21 June 2016 | |

== Squad information ==
=== First team squad ===
As of 03 October 2016.

| Squad No. | Name | Nationality | Position(s) | Date of birth (age) |
Goalkeepers
| 32 | Albino Gomes | (India) | GK | 7 February 1994 (age 32) |
| 1 | Amrinder Singh | (India) | GK | 27 May 1993 (age 33) |
| 25 | Roberto Volpato Neto | (Brazil) | GK | 1 July 1979 (age 47) |
Defenders
| 2 | Aiborlang Khongjee | (India) | Defender | 9 December 1987 (age 38) |
| 5 | Anwar Ali | (India) | Defender | 24 September 1984 (age 42) |
| 3 | Ashutosh Mehta | (India) | RB | 21 February 1991 (age 35) |
| 30 | Facundo Cardozo | (Argentina) | CB / LB | 6 April 1995 (age 31) |
| 4 | Gerson Vieira | (Brazil) | CB | 4 October 1992 (age 34) |
| 23 | Lalchhuanmawia Fanai | (India) | LB | 14 April 1989 (age 37) |
| 21 | Lalhmangaihsanga Ralte | (India) | LB | 6 July 1988 (age 38) |
| 26 | Lucian Goian | (Romania) | CB | 10 February 1983 (age 43) |
Midfielders
| 14 | Boithang Haokip | (India) | CM | 9 March 1991 (age 35) |
| 17 | David Lalrinmuana | (India) | Midfielder | 9 November 1992 (age 34) |
| 12 | Jackichand Singh | (India) | Left wing | 17 March 1992 (age 34) |
| 6 | Krisztián Vadócz | (Hungary) | Central midfield | 30 May 1985 (age 41) |
| 8 | Léo Costa | (Brazil) | Right midfield | 3 March 1986 (age 40) |
| 20 | Matías Defederico | (Argentina) | Attacking midfield | 23 August 1989 (age 37) |
| 22 | Otacilio Brito Alves | (Brazil) | Midfielder | 22 January 1996 (age 30) |
| 26 | Sehnaj Singh | (India) | CM | 29 July 1993 (age 33) |
| 16 | Sony Norde | (Haiti) | AM | 27 July 1989 (age 37) |
| 27 | Thangjam Saran Singh | (India) | Right midfield | 1 March 1987 (age 39) |
| 13 | Udanta Singh | (India) | Left wing | 14 June 1996 (age 30) |
Strikers
| 10 | Diego Forlán | (Uruguay) | Secondary striker | 19 May 1979 (age 47) |
| 11 | Sunil Chhetri | (India) | Centre-forward | 3 August 1984 (age 42) |
| 37 | Thiago dos Santos Cunha | (Brazil) | Centre-forward | 25 April 1985 (age 41) |

=== Coaching staff ===
| Position | Name |
|---|---|
| Manager | (Costa Rica) Alexandre Guimarães |
| Assistant coach | (Brazil) Juliano Fontana |
| Assistant coach | (India) Alex Ambrose |
| Goalkeeping coach | (Brazil) Alexandre Lopes |
| CEO | (India) Indranil Das Blah |
| Team Manager | (India) Watson Fernandes |
| Head Analyst | (India) Sujay Sharma |

== Indian Super League ==
| Pos | Team | Pld | W | D | L | GF | GA | GD | Pts | Qualification |
|---|---|---|---|---|---|---|---|---|---|---|
| 1 | Mumbai City | 14 | 6 | 5 | 3 | 16 | 8 | +8 | 23 | Advance to ISL Play-offs |
| 2 | Kerala Blasters | 14 | 6 | 4 | 4 | 12 | 14 | −2 | 22 | Advance to ISL Play-offs |
| 3 | Delhi Dynamos | 14 | 5 | 6 | 3 | 27 | 17 | +10 | 21 | Advance to ISL Play-offs |
| 4 | Atlético de Kolkata (C) | 14 | 4 | 8 | 2 | 16 | 14 | +2 | 20 | Advance to ISL Play-offs |
| 5 | NorthEast United | 14 | 5 | 3 | 6 | 14 | 14 | 0 | 18 | |

Source: Indian Super League
Rules for classification: 1) points; 2) head-to-head points; 3) head-to-head goal difference; 4) goal difference; 5) number of goals scored; 6) play-off match
(C) Champions

=== Results summary ===
| Overall | | | | | | | | Home | | | | | | Away | | | | | |
| Pld | W | D | L | GF | GA | GD | Pts | W | D | L | GF | GA | GD | W | D | L | GF | GA | GD |
|---|---|---|---|---|---|---|---|---|---|---|---|---|---|---|---|---|---|---|---|
| 14 | 6 | 5 | 3 | 16 | 8 | +8 | 23 | 3 | 2 | 2 | 9 | 3 | +6 | 3 | 3 | 1 | 7 | 5 | +2 |

Last updated: 3 December 2016.
Source: Matches

=== Matches ===
Win Draw Loss

| 3 October 2016 1 | FC Pune City | 0–1 | Mumbai City FC | Pune |
| 19:00 IST (UTC+5:30) | Rahul Bheke (yellow card) 35'; Jonatan Lucca (yellow card) 53' | Report | Léo Costa (yellow card) 14'; Sehnaj Singh (yellow card) 36'; Matías Defederico 68'; Lucian Goian (yellow card) 88' | Stadium: Balewadi Stadium; Attendance: 8189; Referee: Ali Abdulnabi |

| 7 October 2016 2 | Mumbai City FC | 1–0 | NorthEast United FC | Mumbai |
| 19:00 IST (UTC+5:30) | Diego Forlán 55' (pen.); Pronay Halder (yellow card) 69' | Report | Rowllin Borges (yellow card) 32'; Nicolas Velez (yellow card) 82' | Stadium: Mumbai Football Arena; Attendance: 6147; Referee: F.Guerrero |

| 11 October 2016 3 | Mumbai City FC | 1–1 | Atlético de Kolkata | Mumbai |
| 19:00 IST (UTC+5:30) | Aiborlang Khongjee (yellow card) 22'; Matías Defederico 27'; Pronay Halder (yellow card) 53' (yellow-red card) 72'; Sehnaj Singh (yellow card) 75' | Report | Bikramjit Singh (yellow card) 24'; Javier Grande 83'; Sameehg Doutie (yellow card) 90' | Stadium: Mumbai Football Arena; Attendance: 7562; Referee: Ali Abdulnabi |

| 14 October 2016 4 | Kerala Blasters FC | 1–0 | Mumbai City FC | Kochi |
| 19:00 IST (UTC+5:30) | Michael Chopra 58'; Josué Currais (yellow card) 90' | Report | Facundo Cardozo (yellow card) 47'; Sehnaj Singh (yellow card) 90' | Stadium: Jawaharlal Nehru International Stadium; Attendance: 40013; Referee: Tejas Nagvenkar |

| 18 October 2016 5 | Delhi Dynamos FC | 3–3 | Mumbai City FC | Delhi |
| 19:00 IST (UTC+5:30) | Ibrahima Niasse (yellow card) 36'; Richard Gadze 51'; Badara Badji 76'; Marcelo Pereira 83' (pen.); Marcelo Pereira (yellow card) 83'; Richard Gadze (yellow card) 90' | Report | Krisztián Vadócz 33'; Krisztián Vadócz 38'; Sehnaj Singh (yellow card) 57'; Sony Norde 33'; Pronay Halder (yellow card) 86'; Matías Defederico (yellow card) 90' | Stadium: Jawaharlal Nehru Stadium; Attendance: 15269; Referee: Santosh Kumar |

| 21 October 2016 6 | Mumbai City FC | 0-1 | FC Goa | Mumbai |
| 19:00 IST (UTC+5:30) | Lucian Goian (yellow card) 28' | Report | Pratesh Shirodkar (yellow card) 17'; Richarlyson 40'; Robin Singh (yellow card) 66' | Stadium: Mumbai Football Arena; Attendance: 7690; Referee: Sandro Meira Ricci |

| 25 October 2016 7 | Atlético de Kolkata | 0–1 | Mumbai City FC | Kolkata |
| 19:00 IST (UTC+5:30) | Iain Hume (yellow card) 22'; Abhinas Ruidas (yellow card) 36'; José Arroyo (yellow card) 81' | Report | Krisztián Vadócz (yellow card) 26'; Diego Forlán 79'; Ashutosh Mehta (yellow card) 84' | Stadium: Rabindra Sarobar Stadium; Attendance: 11251; Referee: Sandro Meira Ricci |

| 2 November 2016 8 | Chennaiyin FC | 1–1 | Mumbai City FC | Chennai |
| 19:00 IST (UTC+5:30) | Jeje Lalpekhlua 51'; Raphael Augusto (yellow card) 80' | Report | Anwar Ali (yellow card) 22'; Krisztián Vadócz (yellow card) 80'; Léo Costa 88' | Stadium: Jawaharlal Nehru Stadium; Attendance: 22280; Referee: Sandro Meira Ricci |

| 5 November 2016 9 | NorthEast United FC | 0–1 | Mumbai City FC | Guwahati |
| 19:00 IST (UTC+5:30) | Didier Zokora (yellow card) 50'; Emiliano Alfaro (yellow card) 63'; Nirmal Chettri (yellow card) 90' | Report | Jackichand Singh 45'; Lalrindika Ralte (yellow card) 50'; Albino Gomes (yellow card) 90' | Stadium: Indira Gandhi Athletic Stadium; Attendance: 29989; Referee: O.P. Thakur |

| 10 November 2016 10 | Mumbai City FC | 0–1 | FC Pune City | Mumbai |
| 19:00 IST (UTC+5:30) | Diego Forlán (yellow card) 90' | Report | Eugeneson Lyngdoh 89'; Jesús Tato (yellow card) 90' | Stadium: Mumbai Football Arena; Attendance: 7247; Referee: Rahul Gupta |

| 16 November 2016 11 | FC Goa | 0–0 | Mumbai City FC | Fatorda |
| 19:00 IST (UTC+5:30) | Keenan Almeida (yellow card) 05' | | | Stadium: Jawaharlal Nehru Stadium; Attendance: 18917; Referee: Nivon Robesh Gamini |

| 19 November 2016 12 | Mumbai City FC | 5–0 | Kerala Blasters FC | Mumbai |
| 19:00 IST (UTC+5:30) | Diego Forlán 05'; Diego Forlán 14'; Diego Forlán 63'; Alves 69'; Lucian Goian 73' | Report | Gurwinder Singh (yellow card) 90' | Stadium: Mumbai Football Arena; Attendance: 7583; Referee: Nivon Robesh Gamini |

| 23 November 2016 13 | Mumbai City FC | 2–0 | Chennaiyin FC | Mumbai |
| 19:00 IST (UTC+5:30) | Gerson Vieira (yellow card) 07'; Matías Defederico 32'; Sehnaj Singh (yellow card) 55'; Krisztián Vadócz 60' | Report | | Stadium: Mumbai Football Arena; Attendance: 7645; Referee: Santosh Kumar |

| 3 December 2016 14 | Mumbai City FC | 0–0 | Delhi Dynamos FC | Mumbai |
| 19:00 IST (UTC+5:30) | Sehnaj Singh (yellow card) 39' | Report | Bruno Pelissari (yellow card) 71' | Stadium: Mumbai Football Arena; Attendance: 7690; Referee: Rahul Gupta |

== Knockout phase ==
In the knockout phase, teams played against each other over two legs on a home-and-away basis, except for the one-match final.

=== Semi-finals ===
Win Draw Loss

| 10 December 2016 2 | Atlético de Kolkata | 3–2 | Mumbai City FC | Kolkata |
| 19:00 IST (UTC+5:30) | Lalrindika Ralte 03'; Lalrindika Ralte (yellow card) 23'; Iain Hume 39'; Iain Hume 45' (pen.); Henrique Sereno (yellow card) 81' | Report | Léo Costa 10'; Gerson Vieira 19'; Otacilio Alves (yellow card) 21'; Laihsanga Ralte (yellow card) 31'; Diego Forlán (yellow card) 52' (yellow-red card) 76' | Stadium: Rabindra Sarobar Stadium; Attendance: 12500; Referee: H.Dilan Perera |

| 13 December 2016 3 | Mumbai City FC | 0–0 | Atlético de Kolkata | Mumbai |
| 19:00 IST (UTC+5:30) | Thiago Cunha (red card) 94' | Report | Borja Fernández (yellow card) 26'; Robert Lalthlamuana (yellow card) 35' (yellow-red card) 43'; Abhinas Ruidas (yellow card) 45'; Debjit Majumder (yellow card) 64'; Juan Belencoso (red card) 94' | Stadium: Mumbai Football Arena; Attendance: 7562; Referee: A. Rowan |

== Player statistics ==
List of squad players, including number of appearances by competition

| No. | Pos | Nat | Player | Total | | Indian Super League | |
| No. | Pos | Nat | Player | Apps | Goals | Apps | Goals |
|---|---|---|---|---|---|---|---|
| 1 | GK | (India) IND | Amrinder Singh | 6 | 0 | 6 | 0 |
| 25 | GK | (Brazil) BRA | Roberto Volpato | 6 | 0 | 6 | 0 |
| 31 | GK | (India) IND | Arnab Das Sharma | 0 | 0 | 0 | 0 |
| 32 | GK | (India) IND | Albino Gomes | 4 | 0 | 4 | 0 |
| 2 | DF | (India) IND | Aiborlang Khongjee | 12 | 0 | 11+1 | 0 |
| 3 | DF | (India) IND | Ashutosh Mehta | 5 | 0 | 1+4 | 0 |
| 4 | DF | (Brazil) BRA | Gerson Vieira | 14 | 1 | 11+3 | 1 |
| 5 | DF | (India) IND | Anwar Ali | 14 | 0 | 12+2 | 0 |
| 18 | DF | (Romania) ROU | Lucian Goian | 16 | 0 | 16 | 0 |
| 21 | DF | (India) IND | Lalhmangaihsanga Ralte | 16 | 0 | 15+1 | 0 |
| 23 | DF | (India) IND | Lalchhuanmawia Fania | 1 | 0 | 0+1 | 0 |
| 30 | DF | (Argentina) ARG | Facundo Cardozo | 6 | 0 | 1+5 | 0 |
| 33 | DF | (India) IND | Munmun Lugun | 0 | 0 | 0 | 0 |
| 6 | MF | (Hungary) HUN | Krisztián Vadócz | 16 | 3 | 16 | 3 |
| 8 | MF | (Brazil) BRA | Léo Costa | 11 | 2 | 9+2 | 2 |
| 12 | MF | (India) IND | Jackichand Singh | 8 | 1 | 1+7 | 1 |
| 14 | MF | (India) IND | Boithang Haokip | 3 | 0 | 2+1 | 0 |
| 15 | MF | (India) IND | Pronay Halder | 5 | 0 | 5 | 0 |
| 17 | MF | (India) IND | David Lalrinmuana | 2 | 0 | 1+1 | 0 |
| 20 | MF | (Argentina) ARG | Matías Defederico | 14 | 3 | 12+2 | 3 |
| 26 | MF | (India) IND | Sehnaj Singh | 15 | 0 | 14+1 | 0 |
| 27 | MF | (India) IND | Thangjam Singh | 0 | 0 | 0 | 0 |
| 10 | FW | (Uruguay) URU | Diego Forlán | 12 | 5 | 12 | 5 |
| 11 | FW | (India) IND | Sunil Chhetri | 6 | 0 | 6 | 0 |
| 13 | FW | (India) IND | Udanta Singh | 1 | 0 | 1 | 0 |
| 16 | FW | (Haiti) HAI | Sony Norde | 11 | 1 | 7+4 | 1 |
| 22 | FW | (Brazil) BRA | Otacilio Brito Alves | 13 | 1 | 6+7 | 1 |
| 28 | FW | (India) IND | Rakesh Oram | 1 | 0 | 1 | 0 |
| 37 | FW | (Brazil) BRA | Thiago Cunha | 6 | 0 | 0+6 | 0 |

== See also ==
- 2016–17 in Indian football
