= List of 2016 Indian Super League season roster changes =

2016 Indian Super League season roster changes
- Season: 2016 Indian Super League

This is a list of all roster changes that occurred prior to the 2016 Indian Super League.

== Retained players ==
=== Atlético de Kolkata ===
Foreign players

Position	Player
DF	(Spain) Tiri
MF	(Spain) Borja Fernández
MF	(Spain) Javi Lara
MF	(Botswana) Ofentse Nato
MF	(South Africa) Sameehg Doutie
FW	(Portugal) Hélder Postiga (marquee)
FW	(Canada) Iain Hume

Indian players

Position	Player
DF	(India) Arnab Mondal
MF	(India) Jewel Raja

=== Chennaiyin ===
Foreign players

Position	Player
DF	(France) Bernard Mendy
DF	(Brazil) Éder
MF	(Italy) Manuele Blasi
MF	(Brazil) Raphael Augusto

Indian players

Position	Player
GK	(India) Karanjit Singh
GK	(India) Pawan Kumar
DF	(India) Dhanachandra Singh
DF	(India) Abhishek Das
DF	(India) Mehrajuddin Wadoo
MF	(India) Dhanpal Ganesh
MF	(India) Harmanjot Khabra
MF	(India) Jayesh Rane
MF	(India) Thoi Singh
MF	(India) Zakeer Mundampara
FW	(India) Jeje Lalpekhlua

=== Delhi Dynamos ===
Foreign players

Position	Player
GK	(Spain) Toni Doblas
MF	(France) Florent Malouda (marquee)
FW	(Ghana) Richard Gadze

Indian players

Position	Player
GK	(India) Sanjiban Ghosh
DF	(India) Anas Edathodika
MF	(India) Souvik Chakraborty

=== Goa ===
Foreign players

Position	Player
DF	(Martinique) Grégory Arnolin
DF	(Brazil) Luciano Sabrosa
DF	(Brazil) Lúcio (marquee)
MF	(Spain) Jofre
FW	(Brazil) Rafael Coelho
FW	(Brazil) Reinaldo

Indian players

Position	Player
GK	(India) Laxmikant Kattimani
DF	(India) Keenan Almeida
MF	(India) Mandar Rao Desai
MF	(India) Romeo Fernandes

=== Kerala Blasters ===
Foreign players

Position	Player
MF	(Spain) Josu
FW	(England) Antonio German

Indian players

Position	Player
GK	(India) Sandip Nandy
DF	(India) Gurwinder Singh
DF	(India) Sandesh Jhingan
MF	(India) C.K. Vineeth
MF	(India) Ishfaq Ahmed
MF	(India) Mehtab Hossain
FW	(India) Mohammed Rafi

=== Mumbai City ===
Foreign players

Position	Player
MF	(Haiti) Sony Norde

Indian players

Position	Player
GK	(India) Albino Gomes
DF	(India) Ashutosh Mehta
DF	(India) Lalchhuanmawia
FW	(India) Sunil Chhetri

=== NorthEast United ===
Foreign players

Position	Player
Forward	(Argentina) Nicolás Vélez

Indian players

Position	Player
GK	(India) Rehenesh TP
DF	(India) Robin Gurung
DF	(India) Reagan Singh
MF	(India) Seityasen Singh
FW	(India) Holicharan Narzary

=== Pune City ===
Foreign players

To be announced

Indian players

Position	Player
GK	(India) Arindam Bhattacharya
DF	(India) Gouramangi Singh
DF	(India) Dharmaraj Ravanan
MF	(India) Lenny Rodrigues
MF	(India) Eugeneson Lyngdoh

== Player movement and other transactions ==
Date	Name	Moving from	Moving to	Notes
26 April 2016	(India) Pratesh Shirodkar	Mumbai City	Goa	Free
10 May 2016	(India) Zodingliana Ralte	Delhi Dynamos	Pune City	Free
10 May 2016	(India) Vishal Kaith	(India) Shillong Lajong	Pune City	Free
16 May 2016	(India) Lallianzuala Chhangte	(India) DSK Shivajians	NorthEast United	Loan
16 May 2016	(India) Jerry Mawihmingthanga	(India) DSK Shivajians	NorthEast United	Loan
25 May 2016	(India) Subrata Pal	Mumbai City	NorthEast United	Free
25 May 2016	(India) Nirmal Chettri	Free Agent	NorthEast United	Free
25 May 2016	(India) Shouvik Ghosh	(India) Mohun Bagan	NorthEast United	Free
25 May 2016	(India) Rowllin Borges	(India) Sporting Goa	NorthEast United	Free
25 May 2016	(India) Sumeet Passi	(India) Sporting Goa	NorthEast United	Free
30 May 2016	(Japan) Katsumi Yusa	(India) Mohun Bagan	NorthEast United	Free
31 May 2016	(Brazil) Maílson Alves	(Brazil) Volta Redonda	NorthEast United	Free
6 June 2016	(Brazil) Manoel Morais Amorim	(Brazil) Clube de Regatas Brasil	NorthEast United	Free
14 June 2016	(India) Shilton Pal	Kerala Blasters	Atlético de Kolkata	Free
14 June 2016	(India) Debjit Majumder	Mumbai City	Atlético de Kolkata	Free
14 June 2016	(India) Pritam Kotal	Pune City	Atlético de Kolkata	Free
14 June 2016	(India) Kingshuk Debnath	Mumbai City	Atlético de Kolkata	Free
14 June 2016	(India) Robert Lalthlamuana	Delhi Dynamos	Atlético de Kolkata	Free
14 June 2016	(India) Prabir Das	Delhi Dynamos	Atlético de Kolkata	Free
14 June 2016	(India) Bikramjit Singh	Goa	Atlético de Kolkata	Free
14 June 2016	(India) Bidyananda Singh	India U20	Atlético de Kolkata	Free
14 June 2016	(India) Bikash Jairu	Pune City	Atlético de Kolkata	Free
14 June 2016	(India) Lalrindika Ralte	(India) East Bengal	Atlético de Kolkata	Free
15 June 2016	(Argentina) Matías Defederico	(Chile) San Marcos de Arica	Mumbai City	Free
15 June 2016	(India) Rahul Bheke	Kerala Blasters	Pune City	Free
21 June 2016	(India) Jackichand Singh	Pune City	Mumbai City	Free
21 June 2016	(India) Boithang Haokip	NorthEast United	Mumbai City	Free
21 June 2016	(India) Aiborlang Khongjee	NorthEast United	Mumbai City	Free
21 June 2016	(India) Kean Lewis	(India) Mohun Bagan	Delhi Dynamos	Free
21 June 2016	(Spain) Pitu	(Spain) Llagostera	Pune City	Free
23 June 2016	(India) Fanai Lalrempuia	Pune City	NorthEast United	Free
24 June 2016	(Uruguay) Sasha Aneff	(Sweden) Syrianska	NorthEast United	Free
29 June 2016	(Hungary) Krisztián Vadócz	(Australia) Perth Glory	Mumbai City	Free
29 June 2016	(Brazil) Gerson Vieira	(Brazil) Grêmio	Mumbai City	Free
29 June 2016	(India) Arata Izumi	Atlético de Kolkata	Pune City	Free
29 June 2016	(Scotland) Stephen Pearson	(Scotland) Motherwell	Atlético de Kolkata	Free
29 June 2016	(Spain) Pablo Gallardo	(Hong Kong) Dreams Metro Gallery	Atlético de Kolkata	Free
29 June 2016	(Spain) Dani Mallo	(Spain) Albacete	Atlético de Kolkata	Free
5 July 2016	(India) Sanju Pradhan	NorthEast United	Pune City	Free
5 July 2016	(India) Yumnam Raju	NorthEast United	Pune City	Free
7 July 2016	(India) Anwar Ali	Delhi Dynamos	Mumbai City	Free
7 July 2016	(India) David Lalrinmuana	(India) Aizawl	Mumbai City	Free
7 July 2016	(India) Sena Ralte	Chennaiyin	Mumbai City	Free
7 July 2016	(India) Pronay Halder	Goa	Mumbai City	Free
7 July 2016	(India) Thongkhosiem Haokip	Goa	Kerala Blasters	Free
12 July 2016	(Brazil) Léo Costa	(Brazil) Rio Claro	Mumbai City	Free
12 July 2016	(India) Narayan Das	Goa	Pune City	Free
12 July 2016	(India) Augustin Fernandes	Atlético de Kolkata	Pune City	Free
13 July 2016	(India) Pratik Chowdhary	(India) Mumbai	Kerala Blasters	Free
17 July 2016	(India) Robin Singh	Delhi Dynamos	Goa	Free
18 July 2016	(India) Milan Singh	(India) DSK Shivajians	Delhi Dynamos	Loan
18 July 2016	(India) Soram Anganba	(India) Aizawl	Delhi Dynamos	Free
19 July 2016	(India) Nallappan Mohanraj	Atlético de Kolkata	Chennaiyin	Free
19 July 2016	(Romania) Lucian Goian	(Romania) CFR Cluj	Mumbai City	Free
19 July 2016	(Brazil) Roberto Volpato	(Brazil) Água Santa	Mumbai City	Free
20 July 2016	(Brazil) Jonatan Lucca	Goa	Pune City	Free
23 July 2016	(Equatorial Guinea) Eduardo Ferreira	(Iran) Esteghlal Khuzestan	Pune City	Free
23 July 2016	(Senegal) Momar Ndoye	(Spain) Atlético Madrid B	Pune City	Free
26 July 2016	(Spain) Bruno	NorthEast United	Pune City	Free
26 July 2016	(Cameroon) André Bikey	NorthEast United	Pune City	Free
27 July 2016	(Uruguay) Walter Ibáñez	(Peru) Alianza Lima	Mumbai City	Free
27 July 2016	(Argentina) Gastón Sangoy	(Qatar) Al-Wakrah	Mumbai City	Free
27 July 2016	(India) Konsham Singh	(India) Shillong Lajong	Delhi Dynamos	Loan
27 July 2016	(India) Rupert Nongrum	(India) Shillong Lajong	Delhi Dynamos	Free
27 July 2016	(India) Arjun Tudu	(India) Army XI	Delhi Dynamos	Free
28 July 2016	(Northern Ireland) Aaron Hughes	(Australia) Melbourne City	Kerala Blasters	Marquee
28 July 2016	(India) Baljit Sahni	Atlético de Kolkata	Chennaiyin	Free
30 July 2016	(Netherlands) Hans Mulder	Delhi Dynamos	Chennaiyin	Free
1 August 2016	(India) Francis Fernandes	Delhi Dynamos	Pune City	Free
2 August 2016	(Brazil) Gustavo Lazzaretti	(Brazil) Água Santa	NorthEast United	Free
2 August 2016	(India) Siam Hanghal	NorthEast United	Chennaiyin	Free
3 August 2016	(Brazil) Wellington Priori	(South Korea) Gwangju	NorthEast United	Free
3 August 2016	(Republic of Ireland) Graham Stack	(England) Barnet	Kerala Blasters	Free
4 August 2016	(India) Uttam Rai	(India) Dempo	Chennaiyin	Free
4 August 2016	(India) Daniel Lalhlimpuia	(India) Bengaluru FC	Chennaiyin	Loan
4 August 2016	(India) Amoes	(India) Ozone	Delhi Dynamos	Free
4 August 2016	(India) Denson Devadas	(India) Sporting Goa	Delhi Dynamos	Free
6 August 2016	(Italy) Davide Succi	(Italy) Cesena	Chennaiyin	Free
6 August 2016	(Italy) Maurizio Peluso	(Italy) Altovicentino	Chennaiyin	Free
6 August 2016	(India) Denzil Franco	Atlético de Kolkata	Goa	Free
7 August 2016	(England) Michael Chopra	(Scotland) Alloa Athletic	Kerala Blasters	Free
8 August 2016	(Armenia) Apoula Edel	Chennaiyin	Pune City	Free
9 August 2016	(Senegal) Elhadji Ndoye	(Kazakhstan) Kyzylzhar	Kerala Blasters	Free
10 August 2016	(Brazil) Eli Sabiá	(Brazil) Sampaio Corrêa	Chennaiyin	Free
12 August 2016	(Haiti) Kervens Belfort	(Turkey) 1461 Trabzon	Kerala Blasters	Free
13 August 2016	(India) Abhinas Ruidas	(India) East Bengal	Atlético de Kolkata	Loan
13 August 2016	(India) Keegan Pereira	Mumbai City	Atlético de Kolkata	Free
13 August 2016	(Uruguay) Diego Forlán	(Uruguay) Peñarol	Mumbai City	Marquee
14 August 2016	(Ivory Coast) Romaric	(Cyprus) Omonia	NorthEast United	Free
15 August 2016	(Brazil) Wellington de Lima Gomes	(Portugal) Marítimo	NorthEast United	Loan
16 August 2016	(France) Cédric Hengbart	NorthEast United	Kerala Blasters	Free
18 August 2016	(Norway) John Arne Riise	(Norway) Aalesunds	Chennaiyin	Marquee
18 August 2016	(Mexico) Aníbal Zurdo	(Spain) Gimnàstic	Pune City	Free
20 August 2016	(India) Sahil Tavora	(India) Dempo	Goa	Free
20 August 2016	(India) Fulganco Cardozo	(India) Sporting Goa	Goa	Free
22 August 2016	(India) Mohammed Rafique	Atlético de Kolkata	Kerala Blasters	Free
23 August 2016	(Chad) Azrack Mahamat	(Greece) Levadiakos	Kerala Blasters	Free
24 August 2016	(India) Subhasish Roy Chowdhury	Delhi Dynamos	Goa	Free
24 August 2016	(Iceland) Eiður Guðjohnsen	(Norway) Molde	Pune City	Marquee
25 August 2016	(Spain) Juan Belencoso	(Indonesia) Persib Bandung	Atlético de Kolkata	Free
25 August 2016	(Brazil) Marcelinho	(Brazil) Anápolis	Delhi Dynamos	Free
26 August 2016	(India) Rino Anto	Atlético de Kolkata	Kerala Blasters	Free
27 August 2016	(Uruguay) Emiliano Alfaro	(Thailand) Buriram United	NorthEast United	Free
30 August 2016	(India) Salam Ranjan Singh	(India) Pune	NorthEast United	Free
30 August 2016	(India) Sukhdev Patil	India U19	Goa	Free
30 August 2016	(Ivory Coast) Didier Kadio	(Kazakhstan) Zhetysu	Kerala Blasters	Free
30 August 2016	(Argentina) Gustavo Oberman	(Chile) San Marcos de Arica	Pune City	Free
30 August 2016	(Brazil) Fábio Neves	(South Korea) Gwangju	NorthEast United	Free
30 August 2016	(Brazil) Manoel Morais Amorim	NorthEast United	Released	
30 August 2016	(Jamaica) Duwayne Kerr	(Iceland) Stjarnan	Chennaiyin	Free
31 August 2016	(Spain) Marcos Tébar	(Spain) Llagostera	Delhi Dynamos	Free
1 September 2016	(Brazil) Rafael Dumas	(Brazil) Flamengo	Goa	Loan
1 September 2016	(Brazil) Matheus Goncalves	(Brazil) Flamengo	Goa	Loan
1 September 2016	(Brazil) Richarlyson	(Brazil) Novorizontino	Goa	Free
1 September 2016	(Nigeria) Dudu Omagbemi	Goa	Chennaiyin	Free
1 September 2016	(Ghana) David Addy	(Belgium) Waasland-Beveren	Delhi Dynamos	Free
2 September 2016	(Argentina) Facundo Cardozo	(Argentina) Vélez Sarsfield	Mumbai City	Loan
2 September 2016	(India) Vinit Rai	(India) Dempo	Kerala Blasters	Free
3 September 2016	(England) Samir Nabi	(England) West Bromwich Albion	Delhi Dynamos	Loan
3 September 2016	(Spain) Rubén	(Spain) Real Zaragoza	Delhi Dynamos	Free
6 September 2016	(Haiti) Duckens Nazon	(Portugal) Tondela	Kerala Blasters	Free
7 September 2016	(India) Amrinder Singh	(India) Bengaluru FC	Mumbai City	Loan
7 September 2016	(India) Kunal Sawant	(India) Mumbai	Kerala Blasters	Free
7 September 2016	(India) Mohammad Ansari	(India) Pune	Kerala Blasters	Free
7 September 2016	(India) Prasanth Karuthadathkuni	(India) AIFF Elite Academy	Kerala Blasters	Free
7 September 2016	(India) Farukh Choudhary	(India) Lonestar Kashmir	Kerala Blasters	Free
8 September 2016	(Brazil) Memo	(Brazil) América	Delhi Dynamos	Free
10 September 2016	(Senegal) Ibrahima Niasse	(Romania) Concordia Chiajna	Delhi Dynamos	Free
11 September 2016	(Brazil) Júlio César	(Brazil) Ceará	Goa	Free
13 September 2016	(India) Udanta Singh	(India) Bengaluru FC	Mumbai City	Loan
18 September 2016	(Senegal) Badara Badji	(Ghana) Golden Lions SA	Delhi Dynamos	Free
18 September 2016	(India) Lalruatthara	(India) Aizawl	Delhi Dynamos	Loan
20 September 2016	(Spain) Jesús Tato	(Morocco) Moghreb Tétouan	Pune City	Free
26 September 2016	(Iceland) Eiður Guðjohnsen	Pune City	Released (injury)	
26 September 2016	(Cameroon) André Bikey	Pune City	Released (injury)	
30 September 2016	(Japan) Robert Cullen	(South Korea) Seoul E-Land	NorthEast United	Free
1 October 2016	(Mali) Mohamed Sissoko	Free Agent	Pune City	Marquee
8 October 2016	(Mali) Dramane Traoré	(Malaysia) Kelantan	Pune City	Free
15 October 2016	(Spain) Pablo Gallardo	Atlético de Kolkata	Released (injury)	
15 October 2016	(Portugal) Henrique Sereno	(Germany) Mainz 05	Atlético de Kolkata	Free
25 October 2016	(Argentina) Gastón Sangoy	Mumbai City	Released (injury)	
25 October 2016	(Brazil) Thiago Cunha	(Thailand) Port	Mumbai City	Free
1 November 2016	(India) Thangjam Singh	(India) Salgaocar	Mumbai City	Free
1 November 2016	(India) Pronay Halder	Mumbai City	Released (injury)	
