= 2017–18 Indian Super League =

4th season of the Indian Super League

Indian Super League
- Season: 2017–18
- Dates: 17 November 2017 – 17 March 2018
- Champions: Chennaiyin; 2nd ISL title 1st Indian title
- AFC Cup: Chennaiyin
- Matches: 95
- Goals: 261 (2.75 per match)
- Top goalscorer: Coro (18 goals)
- Best goalkeeper: Subrata Pal (102.74 mins per goal)
- Biggest home win: Pune City 5–0 NorthEast United (30 December 2017)
- Biggest away win: Delhi Dynamos 1–5 Goa (16 December 2017); Pune City 0–4 Goa (25 February 2018)
- Highest scoring: Goa 4–3 Bengaluru (30 November 2017); Goa 5–2 Kerala Blasters (9 December 2017); Goa 3–4 Mumbai City (28 January 2018); Delhi Dynamos 4–3 ATK (24 February 2018)
- Longest winning run: Bengaluru (5 games)
- Longest unbeaten run: Bengaluru (10 games)
- Longest winless run: Delhi Dynamos; ATK (8 games)
- Longest losing run: Delhi Dynamos (6 games)
- Highest attendance: 37,986; Kerala Blasters 1–3 Bengaluru (31 December 2017)
- Lowest attendance: 1,121; North East United 0–1 Kerala Blasters (17 February 2018)
- Total attendance: 1,399,409
- Average attendance: 15,047

The 2017–18 Indian Super League season was the fourth season of the Indian Super League, one of the top Indian professional football leagues. It was established in 2013. The regular season started on 17 November 2017 and ended on 4 March 2018, The Playoffs began on 7 March 2018, concluding with the final on 17 March 2018. ATK were the defending champions from the 2016 season, however they could not advance to the playoffs. Chennaiyin won their second Indian Super League title by defeating Bengaluru 3–2 in the final.

Two new sides joined the league as expansion teams: Bengaluru and Jamshedpur. The two new clubs are the ninth and tenth teams in the league. This made it the first edition of the ISL in which there are more than eight teams participating.This is also the first ISL which was officially recognised by AFC as joint top division league along with I-League. As well as expanding two teams, the league also expanded two more months, being played in five months instead of three. Away goal rule is introduced in semifinals stage in this season.

== Teams ==
Locations of the Indian Super League teams

=== Stadiums and locations ===
Team	City/State	Stadium	Capacity
ATK	Kolkata, West Bengal	Salt Lake Stadium	68,012
Bengaluru	Bengaluru, Karnataka	Sree Kanteerava Stadium	25,810
Chennaiyin	Chennai, Tamil Nadu	Jawaharlal Nehru Stadium	19,691
Delhi Dynamos	Delhi	Jawaharlal Nehru Stadium	32,000
Goa	Margao, Goa	Fatorda Stadium	18,600
Jamshedpur	Jamshedpur, Jharkhand	JRD Tata Sports Complex	24,424
Kerala Blasters	Kochi, Kerala	Kaloor Stadium	38,086
Mumbai City	Mumbai, Maharashtra	Mumbai Football Arena	9,300
NorthEast United	Guwahati, Assam	Indira Gandhi Athletic Stadium	23,627
Pune City	Pune, Maharashtra	Balewadi Stadium	10,237

==== Expansion ====
On 11 May 2017, it was announced by the Indian Super League organizers that they would be inviting bids for new teams to join the league for the upcoming season. The bids would be for ten cities, namely Ahmedabad, Bengaluru, Cuttack, Durgapur, Hyderabad, Jamshedpur, Kolkata, Ranchi, Siliguri and Thiruvananthapuram. It was also clarified that if Kolkata were to win at least one bid for a team, the new "Kolkata" side would have to play away from the city for two seasons.

On 25 May 2017, it was announced that bidding for new teams had ended and that the league's appointed external validator would look over the bids. It was also announced that Bengaluru, the two-time champion of the I-League, India's top-tier professional football league, had submitted a bid. Two weeks later, on 12 June, it was officially announced that Bengaluru (for Bangalore) and Tata Group (for Jamshedpur) had won the bids for the new teams.

=== Personnel and sponsorship ===
Team	Head coach	Kit manufacturer	Shirt sponsor
ATK	(Republic of Ireland) Robbie Keane (Player Manager)	Nivia	CESC Limited
Bengaluru	(Spain) Albert Roca	Puma	JSW
Chennaiyin	(England) John Gregory	Performax	Apollo Tyres
Delhi Dynamos	(Spain) Miguel Ángel Portugal	T10 Sports	Kent RO Systems
Goa	(Spain) Sergio Lobera	None	Deltin
Jamshedpur	(England) Steve Coppell	Nivia	Tata
Kerala Blasters	(England) David James	Admiral	Muthoot Pappachan
Mumbai City	(Costa Rica) Alexandre Guimarães	T10 Sports	Ace Group
NorthEast United	(Israel) Avram Grant	Performax	McDowell's No. 1
Pune City	(Serbia) Ranko Popović	Adidas	Suzuki Gixxer

=== Managerial changes ===
Team	Outgoing manager	Manner of departure	Date of vacancy	Position in table	Incoming manager	Date of appointment
Goa	(Brazil) Zico	Contract finished	18 December 2016	Pre-season	(Spain) Sergio Lobera	6 June 2017
Delhi Dynamos	(Italy) Gianluca Zambrotta	Mutual consent	14 June 2017	Pre-season	(Spain) Miguel Ángel Portugal	29 June 2017
Chennaiyin	(Italy) Marco Materazzi	Mutual consent	6 March 2017	Pre-season	(England) John Gregory	3 July 2017
Jamshedpur	Expansion club			Pre-season	(England) Steve Coppell	14 July 2017
Kerala Blasters	(England) Steve Coppell	Mutual consent	12 July 2017	Pre-season	(Netherlands) René Meulensteen	14 July 2017
ATK	(Spain) José Francisco Molina	Mutual consent	18 December 2016	Pre-season	(England) Teddy Sheringham	14 July 2017
NorthEast United	(Portugal) Nelo Vingada	Mutual consent	15 May 2017	Pre-season	(Portugal) João de Deus	17 July 2017
Pune City	(Spain) Antonio López Habas	Mutual consent	15 September 2017	Pre-season	(Serbia) Ranko Popović	25 September 2017
Kerala Blasters	(Netherlands) René Meulensteen	Sacked	3 January 2018	8th	(England) David James	3 January 2018
NorthEast United	(Portugal) João de Deus	Sacked	3 January 2018	9th	(Israel) Avram Grant	12 January 2018
ATK	(England) Teddy Sheringham	Sacked	24 January 2018	8th	(England) Ashley Westwood (Interim)	24 January 2018
ATK	(England) Ashley Westwood	Resignation	2 March 2018	9th	(Republic of Ireland) Robbie Keane (Player Manager)	3 March 2018

== Overseas players ==
Unlike during the first three seasons of the Indian Super League, the 2017–18 season saw the maximum number of foreign players per team reduced to eight from 11. Also unlike the previous three seasons, the maximum number of foreigners allowed on the pitch at the same time was reduced to five from six.

ATK (8)	Bengaluru (8)	Chennaiyin (8)	Delhi Dynamos (8)	Goa (8)
(Republic of Ireland) Robbie Keane (Portugal) Zequinha (England) Conor Thomas (Spain) Jordi Figueras (England) Tom Thorpe (England) Ryan Taylor (Northern Ireland) Martin Paterson (South Africa) Sibongakonke Mbatha	(England) John Johnson (Spain) Juanan (Australia) Erik Paartalu (Spain) Dimas (Spain) Toni Dovale (Venezuela) Miku (Spain) Daniel Segovia (Spain) Víctor Pérez	(Spain) Iñigo Calderón (Brazil) Raphael Augusto (Slovenia) Rene Mihelič (Spain) Jaime Gavilán (Nigeria) Jude Nworuh (Netherlands) Gregory Nelson (Portugal) Henrique Sereno (Brazil) Maílson Alves	(Brazil) Paulinho Dias (Uruguay) Matías Mirabaje (Venezuela) Gabriel Cichero (Nigeria) Kalu Uche (Spain) Manuel Arana (Spain) Edu Moya (Netherlands) Jeroen Lumu (Spain) Xabi Irureta	(Portugal) Bruno Pinheiro (France) Hugo Boumous (Spain) Coro (Morocco) Ahmed Jahouh (Spain) Chechi (Spain) Manuel Lanzarote (Spain) Edu Bedia (Netherlands) Mark Sifneos
Jamshedpur (8)	Kerala Blasters (8)	Mumbai City (8)	NorthEast United (8)	Pune City (8)
(Spain) Tiri (South Africa) Sameehg Doutie (Brazil) Memo (Haiti) Kervens Belfort (Cameroon) Andre Bikey (Brazil) Matheus Gonçalves (Nigeria) Izu Azuka (Brazil) Wellington Priori	(Canada) Iain Hume (Ghana) Courage Pekuson (Serbia) Nemanja Lakić-Pešić (England) Wes Brown (England) Paul Rachubka (Bulgaria) Dimitar Berbatov (Iceland) Guðjón Baldvinsson (Spain) Pulga	(Romania) Lucian Goian (Brazil) Gerson Vieira (Brazil) Éverton Santos (Spain) Rafa Jordà (Brazil) Léo Costa (Brazil) Márcio Rosário (Cameroon) Achille Emaná (Brazil) Thiago Santos	(Brazil) Marcinho (Portugal) José Gonçalves (Guinea-Bissau) Sambinha (Uruguay) Martín Díaz (Brazil) Danilo (Portugal) Hélio Pinto (Sweden) Maic Sema (Colombia) John Mosquera	(Uruguay) Emiliano Alfaro (Spain) Marcos Tébar (Brazil) Marcelinho (Spain) Rafa (Brazil) Jonatan Lucca (Brazil) Diego Carlos (Austria) Marko Stanković (Spain) Lolo

== Regular season ==
Pos	Team	Pld	W	D	L	GF	GA	GD	Pts	Qualification or relegation
1	Bengaluru	18	13	1	4	35	16	+19	40	Qualification for ISL play-offs
2	Chennaiyin (Note: Qualified for 2019 AFC Cup qualifying play-offs) (C)	18	9	5	4	24	19	+5	32	Qualification for ISL play-offs
3	Goa	18	9	3	6	42	28	+14	30	Qualification for ISL play-offs
4	Pune City	18	9	3	6	30	21	+9	30	Qualification for ISL play-offs
5	Jamshedpur	18	7	5	6	16	18	−2	26	
6	Kerala Blasters	18	6	7	5	20	22	−2	25	
7	Mumbai City	18	7	2	9	25	29	−4	23	
8	Delhi Dynamos	18	5	4	9	27	37	−10	19	
9	ATK	18	4	4	10	16	30	−14	16	
10	NorthEast United	18	3	2	13	12	27	−15	11	

Source: Indian Super League
Rules for classification: 1) points; 2) head-to-head points; 3) head-to-head goal difference; 4) head-to-head goals scored; 5) goal difference; 5) number of goals scored; 6) fair play ranking; 6) drawing of lots
(C) Champions

== Results ==
Home \ Away	KOL	BEN	CHE	DEL	GOA	JAM	KER	MUM	NEU	PUN
ATK	—	0–2	1–2	1–0	1–1	0–1	2–2	1–2	1–0	1–4
Bengaluru	1–0	—	1–2	4–1	2–0	0–1	2–0	2–0	2–1	1–1
Chennaiyin	3–2	1–3	—	2–2	2–3	1–1	1–1	1–0	3–0	1–0
Delhi Dynamos	4–3	2–0	1–1	—	1–5	0–1	1–3	5–1	0–2	2–2
Goa	5–1	4–3	0–1	1–1	—	2–1	5–2	3–4	2–2	0–2
Jamshedpur	0–0	0–2	0–1	3–2	0–3	—	2–1	2–2	1–0	0–1
Kerala Blasters	0–0	1–3	0–0	2–1	1–2	0–0	—	1–1	1–0	1–1
Mumbai City	0–1	1–3	1–0	4–0	2–1	1–2	0–1	—	3–2	0–2
NorthEast United	0–1	0–1	3–1	0–1	2–1	0–0	0–1	0–2	—	0–1
Pune City	3–0	1–3	0–1	2–3	0–4	2–1	1–2	2–1	5–0	—

Updated to match(es) played on 4 March 2018. Source: Indian Super League
Legend: Blue = home team win; Yellow = draw; Red = away team win.

== Playoffs ==
=== Bracket ===
Semi-finals
1	Bengaluru	0	3	3
4	Pune City	0	1	1
2	Chennaiyin	1	3	4
3	Goa	1	0	1

Final
1	Bengaluru	2
2	Chennaiyin	3

=== Semi-finals ===
Team 1	Agg.	Team 2	1st leg	2nd leg
Pune City	1–3	Bengaluru	0–0	1–3
Goa	1–4	Chennaiyin	1–1	0–3

=== Final ===
17 March 2018
20:00 IST

Bengaluru	2–3	Chennaiyin
Chhetri 9'; Miku 90+2'	Report	Alves 17', 45'; Augusto 67'

Sree Kanteerava Stadium, Bangalore
Attendance: 25,753
Referee: Ali Abdulnabi

== Season statistics ==
=== Scoring ===
==== Top scorers ====
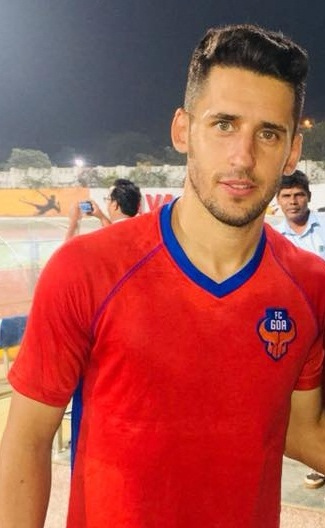
Coro won his first Indian Super League Golden Boot after scoring 18 goals, a record for an ISL season.

Rank	Player	Club	Goals
1	(Spain) Coro	Goa	18
2	(Venezuela) Miku	Bengaluru	15
3	(India) Sunil Chhetri	Bengaluru	14
4	(Nigeria) Kalu Uche	Delhi Dynamos	13
4	(Spain) Manuel Lanzarote	Goa	13
6	(Uruguay) Emiliano Alfaro	Pune City	9
6	(India) Jeje Lalpekhlua	Chennaiyin	9
8	(Brazil) Marcelinho	Pune City	8
9	(India) Balwant Singh	Mumbai City	6
9	(Brazil) Éverton Santos	Mumbai City	6
9	(Republic of Ireland) Robbie Keane	ATK	6

==== Top Indian scorers ====
Rank	Player	Club	Goals
1	Sunil Chhetri	Bengaluru	14
2	Jeje Lalpekhlua	Chennaiyin	9
3	Balwant Singh	Mumbai City	6
4	Adil Khan	Pune City	4
4	Seiminlen Doungel	NorthEast United	4
4	C.K. Vineeth	Kerala Blasters	4
7	Lallianzuala Chhangte	Delhi Dynamos	3
8	Rohit Kumar	Pune City	2
8	Jackichand Singh	Kerala Blasters	2
8	Mandar Rao Desai	Goa	2
8	Bipin Singh	ATK	2
8	Mohammed Rafi	Chennaiyin	2
8	Anirudh Thapa	Chennaiyin	2
8	Dhanpal Ganesh	Chennaiyin	2

==== Hat-tricks ====
Player	For	Against	Result	Date	Ref
(Spain) Coro	Goa	Bengaluru	4–3 (H)	30 November 2017	
(Spain) Coro	Goa	Kerala Blasters	5–2 (H)	9 December 2017	
(Brazil) Marcelinho	Pune City	NorthEast United	5–0 (H)	30 December 2017	
(Canada) Iain Hume	Kerala Blasters	Delhi Dynamos	3–1 (A)	10 January 2018	
(India) Seiminlen Doungel	NorthEast United	Chennaiyin	3–1 (H)	19 January 2018	
(India) Sunil Chhetri	Bengaluru	Pune City	3–1 (H)	11 March 2018	

=== Assists ===
Rank	Player	Club	Assists	Ref
1	(India) Udanta Singh	Bengaluru	7	

=== Cleansheets ===
Rank	Player	Club	Clean sheets
1	(India) Subrata Pal	Jamshedpur	7
1	(India) Gurpreet Singh Sandhu	Bengaluru	7
1	(India) Karanjit Singh	Chennaiyin	7
1	(India) Vishal Kaith	Pune City	7
5	(England) Paul Rachubka	Kerala Blasters	5
6	(India) Debjit Majumder	ATK	4
7	(India) Rehenesh TP	NorthEast United	2
7	(India) Amrinder Singh	Mumbai City	2
7	(India) Naveen Kumar	Goa	2

=== Discipline ===
- Most yellow cards (club): 47
  - Chennaiyin
- Most red cards (club): 4
  - Delhi Dynamos
- Most yellow cards (player): 9
  - (India) Dhanpal Ganesh (Chennaiyin)
- Most red cards (player): 2
  - (India) Pratik Chowdhary (Delhi Dynamos)

== Average home attendances ==
Team	GP	Cumulative	High	Low	Mean
Kerala Blasters	9	285,870	37,986	16,796	31,763
Jamshedpur	9	192,367	24,212	8,178	21,374
Bengaluru	11	209,584	25,753	12,564	19,053
Goa	10	176,038	18,600	16,221	17,604
Chennaiyin	10	155,377	19,013	12,499	15,538
ATK	9	114,021	32,816	3,165	12,669
Pune City	10	87,111	9,968	6,612	8,711
NorthEast United	8	65,736	21,151	1,121	8,217
Delhi Dynamos	8	55,086	11,453	2,332	6,886
Mumbai City	9	58,039	8,597	4,222	6,449
Total	93	1,399,409	37,986	1,121	15,047

== Awards ==
- Source: Indian Super League website

=== Hero of the Match ===
Match	Hero of the Match		Match	Hero of the Match		Match	Hero of the Match	
Match	Player	Club	Match	Player	Club	Match	Player	Club
Match 1	(Serbia) Nemanja Lakić-Pešić	Kerala Blasters	Match 33	(India) Jeje Lalpekhlua	Chennaiyin	Match 65	(Spain) Dimas Delgado	Bengaluru
Match 2	(Brazil) Marcinho	NorthEast United	Match 34	(Brazil) Éverton Santos	Mumbai City	Match 66	(India) Adil Khan	Pune City
Match 3	(Spain) Manuel Lanzarote	Goa	Match 35	(Brazil) Marcelinho	Pune City	Match 67	(England) Ryan Taylor	ATK
Match 4	(India) Sunil Chhetri	Bengaluru	Match 36	(India) Sunil Chhetri	Bengaluru	Match 68	(Spain) Dimas Delgado	Bengaluru
Match 5	(India) Lallianzuala Chhangte	Delhi Dynamos	Match 37	(Spain) Edu Bedia	Goa	Match 69	(Brazil) Wellington Priori	Jamshedpur
Match 6	(Brazil) Raphael Augusto	Chennaiyin	Match 38	(Netherlands) Mark Sifneos	Kerala Blasters	Match 70	(Spain) Marcos Tébar	Pune City
Match 7	(India) Mehtab Hossain	Jamshedpur	Match 39	(Nigeria) Izu Azuka	Jamshedpur	Match 71	(Brazil) Maílson Alves	Chennaiyin
Match 8	(Brazil) Éverton Santos	Mumbai City	Match 40	(Brazil) Marcinho	Northeast United	Match 72	(Nigeria) Kalu Uche	Delhi Dynamos
Match 9	(Brazil) Marcelinho	Pune City	Match 41	(India) Jeje Lalpekhlua	Chennaiyin	Match 73	(Brazil) Maílson Alves	Chennaiyin
Match 10	(Australia) Erik Paartalu	Bengaluru	Match 42	(Spain) Juanan	Bengaluru	Match 74	(Venezuela) Miku	Bengaluru
Match 11	(Brazil) Gerson Vieira	Mumbai City	Match 43	(Canada) Iain Hume	Kerala Blasters	Match 75	(England) Wes Brown	Kerala Blasters
Match 12	(Spain) Coro	Goa	Match 44	(Portugal) Bruno Pinheiro	Goa	Match 76	(Brazil) Wellington Priori	Jamshedpur
Match 13	(Brazil) Memo	Jamshedpur	Match 45	(Portugal) Zequinha	ATK	Match 77	(Brazil) Márcio Rosário	Mumbai City
Match 14	(India) Halicharan Narzary	NorthEast United	Match 46	(Brazil) Maílson Alves	Chennaiyin	Match 78	(Nigeria) Kalu Uche	Delhi Dynamos
Match 15	(India) Jerry Lalrinzuala	Chennaiyin	Match 47	(India) Lallianzuala Chhangte	Delhi Dynamos	Match 79	(Brazil) Éverton Santos	Mumbai City
Match 16	(India) Balwant Singh	Mumbai City	Match 48	(Canada) Iain Hume	Kerala Blasters	Match 80	(India) Karanjit Singh	Chennaiyin
Match 17	(Cameroon) André Bikey	Jamshedpur	Match 49	(Brazil) Memo	Jamshedpur	Match 81	(Nigeria) Kalu Uche	Delhi Dynamos
Match 18	(India) Jeje Lalpekhlua	Chennaiyin	Match 50	(India) Sunil Chhetri	Bengaluru	Match 82	(Spain) Coro	Goa
Match 19	(Venezuela) Miku	Bengaluru	Match 51	(India) Seiminlen Doungel	NorthEast United	Match 83	(India) Gurpreet Singh Sandhu	Bengaluru
Match 20	(Spain) Coro	Goa	Match 52	(Brazil) Diego Carlos	Pune City	Match 84	(Uruguay) Matías Mirabaje	Delhi Dynamos
Match 21	(Spain) Marcos Tébar	Pune City	Match 53	(Brazil) Wellington Priori	Jamshedpur	Match 85	(Spain) Manuel Lanzarote	Goa
Match 22	(Cameroon) Achille Emaná	Mumbai City	Match 54	(Spain) Edu Bedia	Goa	Match 86	(Venezuela) Miku	Bengaluru
Match 23	(Venezuela) Miku	Bengaluru	Match 55	(Uruguay) Emiliano Alfaro	Pune City	Match 87	(Nigeria) Kalu Uche	Delhi Dynamos
Match 24	(England) Wes Brown	Kerala Blasters	Match 56	(India) Anirudh Thapa	Chennaiyin	Match 88	(Spain) Jaime Gavilán	Chennaiyin
Match 25	(Spain) Arana	Goa	Match 57	(Spain) Juanan	Bengaluru	Match 89	(Spain) Coro	Goa
Match 26	(Brazil) Maílson Alves	Chennaiyin	Match 58	(India) Deependra Singh Negi	Kerala Blasters	Match 90	(Republic of Ireland) Robbie Keane	ATK
Match 27	(Portugal) Zequinha	ATK	Match 59	(Brazil) Thiago Santos	Mumbai City	Match 91 (SF)	(Austria) Marko Stanković	Pune City
Match 28	(Brazil) Gerson Vieira	Mumbai City	Match 60	(Brazil) Matheus Gonçalves	Jamshedpur	Match 92 (SF)	(Netherlands) Gregory Nelson	Chennaiyin
Match 29	(Venezuela) Miku	Bengaluru	Match 61	(India) Subrata Pal	Jamshedpur	Match 93 (SF)	(India) Sunil Chhetri	Bengaluru
Match 30	(India) Karanjit Singh	Chennaiyin	Match 62	(Brazil) Marcelinho	Pune City	Match 94 (SF)	(Brazil) Maílson Alves	Chennaiyin
Match 31	(India) Adil Khan	Pune City	Match 63	(India) Gurpreet Singh Sandhu	Bengaluru	Match 95 (F)	(Brazil) Maílson Alves	Chennaiyin
Match 32	(Republic of Ireland) Robbie Keane	ATK	Match 64	(Spain) Coro	Goa			

=== Emerging Player of the Match ===
Match	Emerging Player of the Match		Match	Emerging Player of the Match		Match	Emerging Player of the Match	
Match	Player	Club	Match	Player	Club	Match	Player	Club
Match 1	Hitesh Sharma	ATK	Match 33	Jerry Mawihmingthanga	Jamshedpur	Match 65	Jerry Lalrinzuala	Chennaiyin
Match 2	Hakku Nediyodath	NorthEast United	Match 34	Nanda Kumar	Delhi Dynamos	Match 66	Seminlen Doungel	NorthEast United
Match 3	Jerry Lalrinzuala	Chennaiyin	Match 35	Ashique Kuruniyan	Pune City	Match 67	Bipin Singh	ATK
Match 4	Abhinas Ruidas	Mumbai City	Match 36	Lalruatthara	Kerala Blasters	Match 68	Nishu Kumar	Bengaluru
Match 5	Sarthak Golui	Pune City	Match 37	Brandon Fernandes	Goa	Match 69	Seminlen Doungel	NorthEast United
Match 6	Jerry Lalrinzuala	Chennaiyin	Match 38	Ashique Kuruniyan	Pune City	Match 70	Sahil Panwar	Pune City
Match 7	Lalruatthara	Kerala Blasters	Match 39	Jerry Mawihmingthanga	Jamshedpur	Match 71	Lallianzuala Chhangte	Delhi Dynamos
Match 8	Abhinas Ruidas	Mumbai City	Match 40	Seminlen Doungel	NorthEast United	Match 72	Seiminlen Doungel	NorthEast United
Match 9	Bipin Singh	ATK	Match 41	Nanda Kumar	Delhi Dynamos	Match 73	Jerry Lalrinzuala	Chennaiyin
Match 10	Vinit Rai	Delhi Dynamos	Match 42	Subhasish Bose	Bengaluru	Match 74	Sarthak Golui	Pune City
Match 11	Kamaljit Singh	Pune City	Match 43	Lallianzuala Chhangte	Delhi Dynamos	Match 75	Gursimrat Singh	NorthEast United
Match 12	Mohamed Ali	Goa	Match 44	Brandon Fernandes	Goa	Match 76	Farukh Choudhary	Jamshedpur
Match 13	Jerry Mawihmingthanga	Jamshedpur	Match 45	Prabir Das	ATK	Match 77	Bipin Singh	ATK
Match 14	Lallianzuala Chhangte	Delhi Dynamos	Match 46	Ashique Kuruniyan	Pune City	Match 78	Mohammad Sajid Dhot	Delhi Dynamos
Match 15	Dhanpal Ganesh	Chennaiyin	Match 47	Nanda Kumar	Delhi Dynamos	Match 79	Gursimrat Singh	NorthEast United
Match 16	Davinder Singh	Mumbai City	Match 48	Lalruatthara	Kerala Blasters	Match 80	Lalruatthara	Kerala Blasters
Match 17	Albino Gomes	Delhi Dynamos	Match 49	Jerry Mawihmingthanga	Jamshedpur	Match 81	Lallianzuala Chhangte	Delhi Dynamos
Match 18	Bipin Singh	ATK	Match 50	Udanta Singh	Bengaluru	Match 82	Mohamed Ali	Goa
Match 19	Lalthuammawia Ralte	Bengaluru	Match 51	Anirudh Thapa	Chennaiyin	Match 83	Subhasish Bose	Bengaluru
Match 20	Brandon Fernandes	Goa	Match 52	Sahil Panwar	Pune City	Match 84	Nanda Kumar	Delhi Dynamos
Match 21	Souvik Chakrabarti	Jamshedpur	Match 53	Nanda Kumar	Delhi Dynamos	Match 85	Seriton Fernandes	Goa
Match 22	Jerry Lalrinzuala	Chennaiyin	Match 54	Brandon Fernandes	Goa	Match 86	Nishu Kumar	Bengaluru
Match 23	Isaac Vanmalsawma	Pune City	Match 55	Farukh Choudhary	Jamshedpur	Match 87	Isaac Vanmalsawma	Pune City
Match 24	Lalruatthara	Kerala Blasters	Match 56	Jerry Lalrinzuala	Chennaiyin	Match 88	Germanpreet Singh	Chennaiyin
Match 25	Narayan Das	Goa	Match 57	Seiminlen Doungel	NorthEast United	Match 89	Chinglensana Singh	Goa
Match 26	Nishu Kumar	Bengaluru	Match 58	Munmun Lugun	Delhi Dynamos	Match 90	Halicharan Narzary	NorthEast United
Match 27	Debjit Majumder	ATK	Match 59	Brandon Fernandes	Goa	Match 91 (SF)	Vishal Kaith	Pune City
Match 28	Davinder Singh	Mumbai City	Match 60	Jerry Mawihmingthanga	Jamshedpur	Match 92 (SF)	Anirudh Thapa	Chennaiyin
Match 29	Subhasish Bose	Bengaluru	Match 61	Farukh Choudhary	Jamshedpur	Match 93 (SF)	Isaac Vanmalsawma	Pune City
Match 30	Lalruatthara	Kerala Blasters	Match 62	Lalruatthara	Kerala Blasters	Match 94 (SF)	Jerry Lalrinzuala	Chennaiyin
Match 31	Vishal Kaith	Pune City	Match 63	Subhasish Bose	Bengaluru	Match 95 (F)	Jerry Lalrinzuala	Chennaiyin
Match 32	Hitesh Sharma	ATK	Match 64	Seiminlen Doungel	NorthEast United			

=== Fans' Player of the Month ===
Month	Player of the Month		Reference
Month	Player	Club	Reference
November	(England) Paul Rachubka	Kerala Blasters	
December	(India) Jeje Lalpekhlua	Chennaiyin	
January	(Canada) Iain Hume	Kerala Blasters	
February	(Brazil) Maílson Alves	Chennaiyin	

=== End-of-season awards ===
Award	Player	Club
Hero of the League	(India) Sunil Chhetri	Bengaluru
Emerging Player of the League	(India) Lalruatthara	Kerala Blasters
Golden Glove	(India) Subrata Pal	Jamshedpur
Winning Pass Award	(India) Udanta Singh	Bengaluru
Golden Boot	(Spain) Coro	Goa
Fittest Player of the League	(Spain) Iñigo Calderón	Chennaiyin
Best Pitch of the Season	Delhi Dynamos	

Indian Super League Fans' Team of the Season (2017–18)
Goalkeeper	(India) Gurpreet Singh Sandhu (Bengaluru FC)			
Defenders	(India) Sandesh Jhingan (Kerala Blasters)	(Romania) Lucian Goian (Mumbai City)	(India) Lalruatthara (Kerala Blasters)	(Spain) Tiri (Jamshedpur)
Midfielders	(Spain) Manuel Lanzarote (FC Goa)	(Brazil) Raphael Augusto (Chennaiyin FC)	(Brazil) Wellington Priori (Jamshedpur)	(Spain) Ferran Corominas (FC Goa)
Forwards	(India) Sunil Chhetri (Bengaluru FC)		(Venezuela) Miku (Bengaluru FC)	(India) Balwant Singh (Chennaiyin FC)

== See also ==
- 2017–18 ATK season
- 2017–18 Bengaluru FC season
- 2017–18 Chennaiyin FC season
- 2017–18 Delhi Dynamos FC season
- 2017–18 FC Goa season
- 2017–18 FC Pune City season
- 2017–18 Jamshedpur FC season
- 2017–18 Kerala Blasters FC season
- 2017–18 Mumbai City FC season
- 2017–18 NorthEast United FC season
