= Thiago Santos (footballer, born 1995) =

Brazilian footballer

Personal information
- Full name: Thiago Nascimento dos Santos
- Date of birth: 12 April 1995 (age 31)
- Place of birth: Mari, Brazil
- Height: 1.80 m (5 ft 11 in)
- Position: Winger

Team information
- Current team: Catanduva

Youth career
- 2011: Duque de Caxias
- 2012–2015: Flamengo

Senior career*
Years	Team	Apps	(Gls)
2015–2021	Flamengo	5	(0)
2017–2018	→ Mumbai City (loan)	13	(5)
2019	→ Chapecoense (loan)	0	(0)
2021	Botafogo-PB	0	(0)
2022	Americano	0	(0)
2022–2023	NEROCA	0	(0)
2023	Madureira	0	(0)
2023	Catanduva		
- * Club domestic league appearances and goals as of 5 September 2019

Thiago Nascimento dos Santos (born 12 April 1995) is a Brazilian footballer who plays as a winger.

== Career ==
=== Flamengo ===
In the beginning of 2017 during a festive game, Thiago suffered an injury to the knee that turned out to be a torn ACL; and as a result he will miss the beginning of the 2017 season.

On 22 April 2018, Thiago renewed his contract with Flamengo until 2020.

==== Mumbai City (loan) ====
On 4 September 2017, Thiago Signed on loan with Indian Super League club Mumbai City until the end of season. Thiago scored on his debut in a match against FC Goa, Mumbai City won 2–1.

== Career statistics ==
(Correct As of 5 September 2019)

Club	Season	League			Cup		Continental		Other		Total	
Club	Season	Division	Apps	Goals	Apps	Goals	Apps	Goals	Apps	Goals	Apps	Goals
Flamengo	2015	Série A	1	0	0	0	–	–	0	0	1	0
Flamengo	2016	Série A	4	0	0	0	–	–	2	1	6	1
Flamengo	2017	Série A	0	0	0	0	–	–	0	0	0	0
Flamengo	2018	Série A	0	0	0	0	–	–	0	0	0	0
Flamengo	2019	Série A	0	0	0	0	–	–	2	0	2	0
Flamengo	Total		5	0	0	0	0	0	4	1	9	1
Mumbai City (loan)	2017–18	Super League	13	5	–	–	–	–	–	–	13	5
Mumbai City (loan)	Total		13	5	0	0	0	0	0	0	13	5
Career total			18	5	0	0	0	0	4	1	22	6

== Honours ==
Flamengo

- Campeonato Carioca: 2019

== Personal life ==
He is married to Edinallys Teixeira and has a son Thomaz born in February, 2019.
