= Davinder Singh (footballer) =

Indian footballer (born 1995)

Personal information
- Date of birth: 23 September 1995 (age 31)
- Place of birth: Patiala, Punjab, India
- Height: 1.76 m (5 ft 9 in)
- Position: Right-back

Team information
- Current team: Northern United FC

Youth career
- Dalbir Football Academy
- 2013–2017: Punjabi University

Senior career*
Years	Team	Apps	(Gls)
2017–2019	Mumbai City	8	(0)
2021–2022	Chennaiyin	1	(0)
2022–2023	Real Kashmir	14	(0)
2023–2025	Namdhari	4	(0)
2026–	Northern United	6	(0)

International career
2017–2018	India U23	6	(0)
2018–	India	3	(0)
- * Club domestic league appearances and goals as of 07:40, 26 May 2026 (UTC)

Davinder Singh (born 23 September 1995) is an Indian professional footballer who plays as a defender for Delhi Premier League club Northern United.

== Career ==
Born in Patiala, Punjab. Singh began his career at the Dalbir Football Academy. In 2013, Singh joined the Punjabi University football team. Singh was also part of the academy of Minerva Punjab and was selected by the side to participate in the I-League 2nd Division, however, Singh got injured before the league began.

=== Mumbai City ===
On 17 August 2017, Singh was signed by Mumbai City of the Indian Super League. He made his professional debut for the club on 3 December 2017 in a league match against the Kerala Blasters. Singh started and played the whole match as Mumbai City drew the match 1–1 and won Emerging player of the match award.

== International ==
Singh was selected by India under-23 head coach Stephen Constantine in July 2017 for the 2018 AFC U-23 Championship qualifiers. He was eventually selected and played three matches during the qualifiers. The next month, Constantine called Singh up for the India senior side.

== Career statistics ==
=== Club ===
As of 19 November 2022

Club	Season	League			Cup		AFC		Total	
Club	Season	Division	Apps	Goals	Apps	Goals	Apps	Goals	Apps	Goals
Mumbai City	2017–18	Indian Super League	8	0	1 (Note: Appearance(s) in Super Cup)	0	—		9	0
Mumbai City	2018–19	Indian Super League	0	0	0	0	—		0	0
Mumbai City	Mumbai City total		9	0	1	0	0	0	10	0
Chennaiyin	2021–22	Indian Super League	1	0	0	0	—		1	0
Real Kashmir	2022–23	I-League	2	0	0	0	—		2	0
Career total			11	0	1	0	0	0	12	0

=== International ===
As of matches played till 15 September 2018

National team	Year	Apps	Goals
India	2018	3	0
Total		3	0

== Honours ==
India

- SAFF Championship runner-up: 2018
