= Sehnaj Singh =

Indian footballer (born 1993)

Personal information
- Date of birth: 29 July 1993 (age 33)
- Place of birth: Chandigarh, India
- Height: 1.79 m (5 ft 10 in)
- Position: Central midfielder

Youth career
- 2006–2008: Gurdaspur FA
- 2009–2011: Chandigarh FA

Senior career*
Years	Team	Apps	(Gls)
2011–2013	Pailan Arrows	12	(1)
2013	Mumbai Tigers	14	(3)
2014	Mumbai	5	(1)
2014–2015	Mohun Bagan	18	(1)
2015	Delhi Dynamos	10	(1)
2016	East Bengal	8	(0)
2016–2019	Mumbai City	40	(0)
2017	→ Mohun Bagan (loan)	13	(0)
2019–2020	ATK	8	(0)
2020–2021	East Bengal	6	(0)
2021–2023	NorthEast United	11	(0)
2023–2024	Inter Kashi	4	(0)
2024	Namdhari	6	(0)
2024	→ Thiruvananthapuram Kombans (loan)	0	(0)
2025	Namdhari	0	(0)

International career^{‡}
2011–2012	India U19	2	(0)
2015	India	5	(0)
- * Club domestic league appearances and goals as of 14:30, 1 April 2024 (UTC) ‡ National team caps and goals as of 04:03, 4 December 2021 (UTC)

Sehnaj Singh (born 29 July 1993) is an Indian professional footballer who plays as a midfielder.

== Club career ==
=== Pailan Arrows ===
Sehnaj is a product of the Gurdaspur Football Academy and the Chandigarh Football Academy. During the summer of 2011, he signed for Pailan Arrows who were then known as Indian Arrows, to play in the I-League. He played his first game for the team against East Bengal on 18 December 2011. He then continued in the starting line-up for the Arrows against Pune in a match that ended 1–1.

=== Mumbai Tigers and Mumbai FC ===
Sehnaj joined Mumbai in January 2014 from Mumbai Tigers after the club was disbanded. Sehnaj was initially part of the Mumbai Tigers' squad to take part in the 2013 I-League 2nd Division. He made his debut for Mumbai on 15 January 2014 in the Federation Cup at the Jawaharlal Nehru Stadium, Kochi in which he played the first half before being replaced by Henry Ezeh as Mumbai lost the match 1–0.

=== Mohun Bagan ===
On 20 June 2014 Sehnaj signed for Mohun Bagan. He was a regular for Bagan during the 2014–15 season, appearing 18 times in the centre of midfield as a regular and helping his side be crowned the champions.

=== Delhi Dynamos ===
In July 2015, Sehnaj was drafted to play for Delhi Dynamos for the 2015 Indian Super League. He scored his first goal of the ISL against Kerala Blasters to make the score 3–3 from over 30 yards in the final league game of the Dynamos' season

=== NorthEast United ===
On 6 September 2021, Sehnaj joined NorthEast United on a two-year deal. In 2021–22 season he made ten appearance for NorthEast United.

== International career ==
Sehnaj started his international career at the under-19 level with India U19 against Turkmenistan U19's on 31 October 2011 in the AFC U19 Cup qualifiers.

Sehnaj was called up for the 2018 World Cup group stage games group games against Oman and Guam by Stephen Constantine. He made his national team debut on 11 June 2015 against Oman in a Group D game of the 2018 World Cup qualifier in a 1–2 loss at home in Bengaluru's Sree Kanteerava Stadium. During the second leg of the World Cup qualifier against Guam, India played the second half with 10 men after Sehnaj Singh was sent off for a dangerous tackle in the 41st minute.

== Career statistics ==
=== Club ===
As of 10 December 2023

Club	Season	League			Cup		AFC		Total	
Club	Season	Division	Apps	Goals	Apps	Goals	Apps	Goals	Apps	Goals
Pailan Arrows	2011–12	I-League	5	0	0	0	–		5	0
Pailan Arrows	2012–13	I-League	7	1	0	0	–		7	1
Mumbai Tigers	2013	I-League 2nd Division	14	3	0	0	–		14	3
Mumbai	2013–14	I-League	5	1	3 (Note: Appearance(s) in Super Cup)	0	–		8	1
Mohun Bagan	2014–15	I-League	18	1	3	0	–		21	1
Delhi Dynamos	2015	Indian Super League	10	1	0	0	–		10	1
East Bengal	2015–16	I-League	8	0	2	0	–		10	0
Mumbai City	2016	Indian Super League	15	0	0	0	–		15	0
Mumbai City	2017–18	Indian Super League	13	0	2	0	–		15	0
Mumbai City	2018–19	Indian Super League	12	0	0	0	–		12	0
Mumbai City	Mumbai City total		40	0	2	0	0	0	42	0
Mohun Bagan (loan)	2016–17	I-League	13	0	5	0	4 (Note: Appearance(s) in AFC Cup)	1	22	1
ATK	2019–20	Indian Super League	8	0	0	0	–		8	0
East Bengal	2020–21	Indian Super League	6	0	0	0	–		6	0
NorthEast United	2021–22	Indian Super League	10	0	0	0	–		10	0
NorthEast United	2022–23	Indian Super League	1	0	0	0	–		1	0
NorthEast United	NorthEast United total		11	0	0	0	0	0	11	0
Inter Kashi	2023–24	I-League	4	0	0	0	–		4	0
Namdhari	2023–24	I-League	0	0	0	0	–		0	0
Career total			149	7	15	0	4	1	168	8

== Honours ==
Mohun Bagan

- I-League: 2014–15

ATK

- Indian Super League: 2019–20
