= Kunal Sawant =

Indian footballer (born 1986)

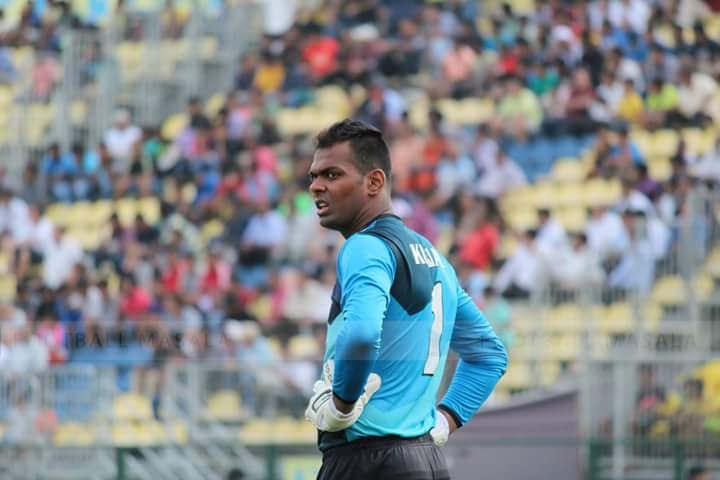

Personal information
- Full name: Kunal Shantaram Sawant
- Date of birth: 23 August 1986 (age 40)
- Place of birth: Mumbai, India
- Height: 1.86 m (6 ft 1 in)
- Position: Goalkeeper

Team information
- Current team: Kenkre FC
- Number: 30

Youth career
- 2002–2003: Goan Sports Club
- 2003–2004: Mahindra United
- 2004–2005: New India Assurance
- 2005–2007: Union Bank of India
- 2007–2009: Central Railway

Senior career*
| Years | Team | Apps | (Gls) |
| 2009–2011 | Air India | 15 | (0) |
| 2012–2016 | Mumbai | 31 | (0) |
| 2015 | → Laxmi Prasad (loan) | 0 | (0) |
| 2016 | → Kerala Blasters (loan) | 0 | (0) |
| 2017–2020 | Mumbai City | | |
- * Club domestic league appearances and goals

Kunal Sawant (born 23 August 1986) is an Indian football goalkeeper playing in the I-League for Kenkre FC.

== Early life ==
Kunal Sawant was born in Mumbai, India, and attended Don Bosco High School, Borivali.

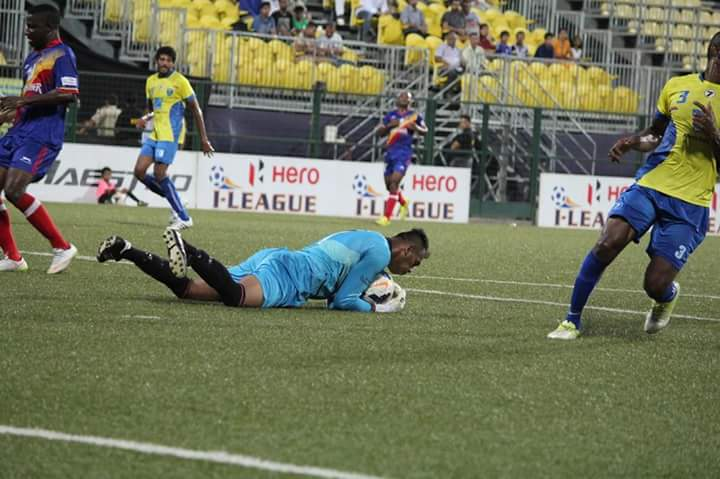
Kunal Sawant Saving a shot

== Amateur league ==
After finishing school, Sawant was selected for Goans Sports Club (a local club in Mumbai, playing in the First Division) and played with them from 2002 until 2003. He was later selected to play with Mahindra United U-19 team and had a brief stint playing in the Indian National Football League. From 2004 until 2009, Sawant played for New India Assurance (Super Division), Dena Bank (Super Division), Union Bank of India (Elite Division) and Central Railway (Elite Division).

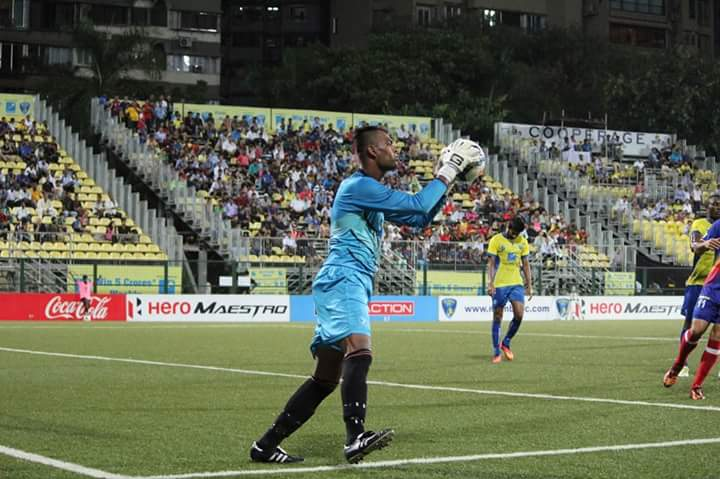
Kunal Sawant throwing out a ball

== Professional league ==
In 2009, Bimal Ghosh initiated Sawant into India's professional football circle, to play for Air India's football team. Two years later, on 3 February 2011, Sawant found himself on the receiving end of an injury during a match against Salgaocar F.C., while playing in an I-League match. Medical professionals advised Sawant that his hand would recover gradually, but his career would never.

However, Sawant made a comeback on 28 October 2012 with Mumbai F.C. in the I-League. Sawant also represented Maharashtra in Santosh Trophy tournament in 2009, 2010 and 2012. During 2015 I-League season hiatus, 4 Mumbai F.C. players – Climax Lawrence (former India captain), Nicholas Rodrigues, Valerian Rebello and Sawant, were invited to play for Tuff Laxmi Prasad Sports Club on a short-term contract in the Goa Professional League.

== Indian Super League (ISL) ==
In June 2016, Sawant signed a contract with Sachin Tendulkar's Kerala Blasters FC to be the team's goalkeeper for the 2016 Indian Super League. Kerala Blasters FC finished the tournament by securing the second position. After his playing career, Sawant switched to coaching. He has been involved in goalkeeping coaching for teams in the Indian football circuit, including his role as goalkeeping coach with Kerala Blasters FC.
