= Márcio Rozário =

Brazilian footballer

Personal information
- Full name: Márcio Nascimento Rozário
- Date of birth: 21 November 1983 (age 42)
- Place of birth: São Mateus (ES), Brazil
- Height: 1.87 m (6 ft 2 in)
- Position: Centre-back

Senior career*
Years	Team	Apps	(Gls)
2005	Linhares	14	(0)
2006	Juventude	23	(0)
2007	Caxias	2	(0)
2007	Macaé	14	(0)
2008	Inter-SM	7	(0)
2008	América-RN	4	(0)
2008–2009	Al-Jazira	47	(1)
2010–2011	Botafogo	26	(0)
2011–2012	Fluminense	23	(1)
2012	Náutico	8	(0)
2012–2014	Marítimo	50	(0)
2012–2013	→ Marítimo II (loan)	1	(0)
2014–2016	Suphanburi	70	(2)
2017	Persela Lamongan	10	(1)
2017	Mumbai City	15	(1)
2018	Persipura Jayapura	13	(1)
2019	Metropolitano	6	(0)
2019	Inter de Lages	6	(1)
- * Club domestic league appearances and goals

Márcio Nascimento Rozário (born 21 November 1983) is a Brazilian former footballer who played as a center back.

== Club career ==
Márcio Rozário previously played for Juventude in the Campeonato Brasileiro. He was hired by the UAE side Al-Jazira in 2008 at the request of the coach Abel Braga. In July 2010, he left UAE after two seasons with the Al-Jazira.

On 2 August 2010, Márcio Rozário signed a one-year contract with Botafogo. Next year, he moved to Fluminense which was managed by Abel Braga on 26 May. In August 2012, Márcio Rozário signed a two-year contract with CS Marítimo.
