= Jackichand Singh Telem =

Indian footballer

Jackichand Singh
Personal information
- Full name: Jackichand Singh Telem
- Date of birth: 17 March 1992 (age 34)
- Place of birth: Keikol, Manipur, India
- Height: 1.60 m (5 ft 3 in)
- Position: Winger

Team information
- Current team: NEROCA FC
- Number: 22

Youth career
- 2004–2005: Army Boys Academy
- 2005–2011: Royal Wahingdoh

Senior career*
Years	Team	Apps	(Gls)
2009–2015	Royal Wahingdoh	56	(14)
2015–2016	Pune City	9	(1)
2016	Salgaocar	16	(2)
2016	Mumbai City	8	(1)
2017	East Bengal	7	(0)
2017–2018	Kerala Blasters	17	(2)
2018–2020	Goa	43	(14)
2020–2021	Jamshedpur	12	(0)
2021–2023	Mumbai City	6	(0)
2021–2022	→ East Bengal (loan)	7	(0)
2023–2024	Inter Kashi	3	(1)
2025-	NEROCA FC	1	(0)

International career^{‡}
2015–2019	India	19	(2)
- * Club domestic league appearances and goals as of 18:17, 29 January 2025 (IST) ‡ National team caps and goals as of 6 January 2020

Jackichand Singh Telem (Meitei: Telem Jackichand Singh, born 17 March 1992) is an Indian professional footballer who plays as a winger for I-League 2 club NEROCA FC.

== Club career ==
=== Royal Wahingdoh ===
==== 2011–2014 (I-League 2nd Division) ====
Jackichand made his professional debut for Royal Wahingdoh, then in the I-League 2nd Division, on 19 September 2011 in the Federation Cup against Churchill Brothers. Wahingdoh won the game 2–1 with Jacki scoring the second goal in the 53rd minute to complete an upset in the cup. Jackichand would play twice more in the group stage of the federation Cup, scoring once more, but couldn't help his team qualify from the group. He was an integral part of Royal Wahingdoh's squad during their 2011 I-League 2nd Division campaign and would score three times during the group stages, helping his team qualify for the 2011 I-League 2nd Division final round as group winners, but Wahingdoh finished 6th and failed to get promoted. Jackichand was part of the squad again during the 2012 I-League 2nd Division season, where Wahingdoh once again qualified form their group as group winners for the final round, with Jacki scoring twice. During the final round, we can account for 10 appearances that he made, scoring 8 times but could not help his team gain promotion to the I-League. Jackichand continued with Royal Wahingdoh for the 2013 I-League 2nd Division but this time, Wahingdoh failed to qualify for the final round from their group as they finished third. Finally, it was in the 2014 I-League 2nd Division when Wahingdoh won the tournament thus gaining promotion, after qualifying as group winners to the 2014 I-League 2nd Division final round, during which Jackichand scored two goals in the final round.

==== 2014–2015 ====
Jackichand started the first game of the new season for Royal Wahingdoh after gaining promotion, against Mumbai in the 2014-15 Federation Cup in a 2–1 win where he scored both his team's goals either side of half-time. He scored his third goal of the Federation Cup against Sporting Goa on 4 January 2015 in a 2–1 loss.

He made his I-league debut on 18 January against Shillong Lajong in the first ever Shillong Derby in the I-league and assisted teammate Satiyasen Singh for the 2nd Goal in a 2–1 win. Jackichand scored his first I-League goal against Salgaocar. He scored his second goal of the season in a 1–1 draw with Bharat FC on 21 March 2015. Jacki scored a brace against Pune in a 2–0 win at home on 29 March 2015. He assisted Godwin Franco in a 1–0 win at home against East Bengal on 31 March 2015. Jackichand assisted teammate Satiyasen Singh thrice for his hat-trick against Salgaocar on 3 May 2015 in a 4–2 win for his team. At the end of the 2014–15 season Jackichand was awarded the best player of the season award.

=== Pune City ===
On 10 July 2015, Jackichand was auctioned to play for FC Pune City for ₹45 lakhs (€58.2k) in the 2015 Indian Super League. He made his debut for the club against then ISL club Delhi Dynamos on 14 October 2015. It took him only two appearances to score for the club against ATK on 17 October 2015. He scored the goal in 1 minute and 15 seconds. It was the fastest goal scored in the second edition of ISL. He made his final appearance for the club against NorthEast United on 2 December 2015. He finished the season with 9 appearances, scoring one goal in the process.

==== Salgaocar (loan) ====
On 1 January 2016, Jackichand signed for Salgaocar as Royal Wahingdoh decided to withdraw from I-League, on loan from Pune City for the 2015-16 I-League. He made his debut for the team in 2015–16 I-League against Bengaluru FC. On 9 January 2016. Jackichand scored his first goal for Salgaocar against Mumbai in I-League in a 2–1 loss. He made his final appearance for the club against Sporting Goa on 23 April 2016.

=== Mumbai City ===
On 21 June 2016, Mumbai City announced the signing of Jackichand for the third season of ISL. He made his debut on 3 October against his former club Pune City, coming on as a 90th-minute substitute for Léo Costa in a 1–0 win. On 5 November 2016, he scored his first and winning goal for the club, in the 45th minute against NorthEast United after the NorthEast goalkeeper Lima Gomes made a mistake. He made his final appearance for the club against ATK on 13 December 2016, in a 0–0 draw (3-2 agg loss) in the 2nd leg semi-final playoffs.

==== East Bengal (loan) ====
On 1 January 2017, Singh signed for then I-League club East Bengal for the 2016–17 I-League season. He made his debut against eventual champions Aizawl on 7 January 2017 in a 1–1 draw. But appearances was hard to come by for Singh as then East Bengal head coach Trevor Morgan did not need wingers in his system. He only made 7 appearances for the club from which 4 appearances came from the bench. His last appearance for the club came against Punjab on 23 April 2017.

=== Kerala Blasters ===
On 23 July 2017, Singh was selected in the 8th round of the 2017–18 ISL Players Draft by the Kerala Blasters for the 2017–18 Indian Super League. He made his debut for the club on 17 November 2017 against ATK. He came on as an 81st-minute substitute for Courage Pekuson as Kerala Blasters drew 0–0. Singh then scored his first goal for the club on 9 December 2017 against Goa. He scored the equalizer for the Kerala Blasters in the 30th minute to make it 2–2 but unfortunately the club would go on to lose 5–2. He then scored his second goal for the club on 2 February 2018 against Pune City. His 58th-minute goal was the opener in a 2–1 victory for the Blasters. He finished the season with 2 goals in 17 appearances for the club as Kerala Blasters finished 6th in the league standings.

=== FC Goa ===
On 1 July 2018, he signed for Goa from Kerala Blasters. On 14 February he scored a goal from 22 yards which was one of the fastest goals in the 18-19 ISL season which resulted in a 3–0 victory for FC Goa against two time ISL winners ATK. He was one of the most impressive players for the Gaurs in his first season with them, scoring 4 goals and laying out 4 assists in 21 appearances as he helped Goa reach the ISL final. He continued this form by scoring 5 goals in 19 appearances in his second season with the club as Goa finished 1st in the league standings, and thus became the first Indian club to qualify for the AFC Champions League group stage.

=== Jamshedpur ===
On 18 August 2020, Singh signed a 3-year contract with Jamshedpur for the upcoming ISL season. He was assigned the number 12 shirt. He assisted on his debut against Chennaiyin in a 2–1 loss on 24 November.

=== Return to Mumbai City ===
Mumbai City confirmed the signing of Jackichand Singh from Jamshedpur FC on 23 January 2021 for the remainder of ISL season 2020–2021.The Manipur-born winger has delivered three assists in his 12 appearances for Jamshedpur FC in the Indian Super League 2020–2021.

==== Return to East Bengal (loan) ====
On 1 September 2021, Jackichand returned to East Bengal on a season-long loan.

=== Inter Kashi ===
On 13 September 2023, Inter Kashi announced the signing of Jackichand.

== International career ==
Jackichand made his senior national team debut against Nepal on 12 March 2015, coming on as a substitute for Lalrindika Ralte. On 7 June 2016, Jackichand came on as a 44th-minute substitute for Udanta Kumam in a home match against Laos at Indira Gandhi Athletic Stadium, Guwahati, where he provided three assists and helped India to qualify for third round of AFC Asian Cup Qualifiers. On 3 September 2016, Jackichand scored his first senior goal for India in a 4–1 win against Puerto Rico at Andheri Sports Complex, Mumbai. On 7 June 2019, in an Asian Cup qualifier against Laos, Jackichand assisted thrice after coming on as a substitute in the first half in a 6–1 win for India.

== Career statistics ==
=== Club ===
As of 17 November 2023

Club	Season	League			Cup		AFC		Total	
Club	Season	Division	Apps	Goals	Apps	Goals	Apps	Goals	Apps	Goals
Royal Wahingdoh	2014–15	I-League	18	5	4 (Note: Appearance(s) in Federation Cup)	3	—		22	8
Pune City	2015	Indian Super League	9	1	0	0	—		9	1
Salgaocar (loan)	2015–16	I-League	16	2	2	0	—		18	2
Mumbai City	2016	Indian Super League	8	1	0	0	—		8	1
East Bengal (loan)	2016–17	I-League	7	0	4	0	—		11	0
Kerala Blasters	2017–18	Indian Super League	17	2	3 (Note: Appearance(s) in Super Cup)	0	—		20	2
Goa	2018–19	Indian Super League	21	4	4	0	—		25	4
Goa	2019–20	Indian Super League	19	5	0	0	—		19	5
Goa	Goa total		40	9	4	0	0	0	44	9
Jamshedpur	2020–21	Indian Super League	12	0	0	0	—		12	0
Mumbai City	2020–21	Indian Super League	6	0	0	0	—		6	0
East Bengal (loan)	2021–22	Indian Super League	7	0	0	0	—		7	0
Inter Kashi	2023–24	I-League	3	1	0	0	—		3	1
Career total			143	21	17	3	0	0	160	24

=== International ===
As of 8 June 2019

National team	Year	Apps	Goals
India	2015	6	0
India	2016	2	1
India	2017	8	1
India	2018	1	0
India	2019	2	0
Total		19	2

==== International goals ====
India score listed first, score column indicates score after each Jackichand goal.

International goals by date, venue, cap, opponent, score, result and competition
No.	Date	Venue	Cap	Opponent	Score	Result	Competition
1	3 September 2016	Andheri Sports Complex, Mumbai, India	9	Puerto Rico	4–1	4–1	Friendly
2	24 August 2017	Mumbai Football Arena, Mumbai, India	16	Saint Kitts and Nevis	1–0	1–1	2017 Hero Tri-Nation Series

== Honours ==
FC Goa

- Indian Super League runner up: 2018–19
- Indian Super Cup: 2019

Mumbai City

- Indian Super League: 2020–21
- Indian Super League Winners' Shield: 2020–21

India

- Tri-Nation Series: 2017
- King's Cup third place: 2019

Individual

- I-League Best Player of the Season: 2014–15

== Personal life ==
Singh's biggest inspiration is fellow Manipuri striker Renedy Singh, and the actor Jackie Chan, who he is named after. He comes from a humble background and he is known as Jacki by his teammates and close friends. He is married to Beauty and has a three-year-old son named Civic. The names of his wife and son are inked on his right arm.
