= Roberto Volpato =

Brazilian footballer

Personal information
- Full name: Roberto Volpato Neto
- Date of birth: 1 July 1979 (age 47)
- Place of birth: Orleans, Brazil
- Height: 1.93 m (6 ft 4 in)
- Position: Goalkeeper

Youth career
- 1998–1999: Criciúma

Senior career*
Years	Team	Apps	(Gls)
1999–2002	Criciúma	103	(0)
2002	Moreirense	26	(0)
2003	Criciúma	2	(0)
2003–2004	Vitória Setúbal	14	(0)
2004–2005	Criciúma	41	(0)
2005–2008	Vasco da Gama	61	(0)
2009–2010	America-RJ	17	(0)
2010–2011	Moreirense	34	(0)
2011–2012	America-RJ	9	(0)
2012	Ituano	16	(0)
2012–2014	Ponte Preta	105	(0)
2015	XV de Piracicaba	10	(0)
2016	Água Santa	8	(0)
2016	Mumbai City FC	6	(0)
2017	Santo André	6	(0)
2019–2021	Próspera	35	(0)
2021	Criciúma	1	(0)
- * Club domestic league appearances and goals

Roberto Volpato Neto or simply Roberto (born 1 July 1979), is a Brazilian former professional footballer who played as a goalkeeper.
