= Krisztián Vadócz =

Hungarian footballer (born 1985)

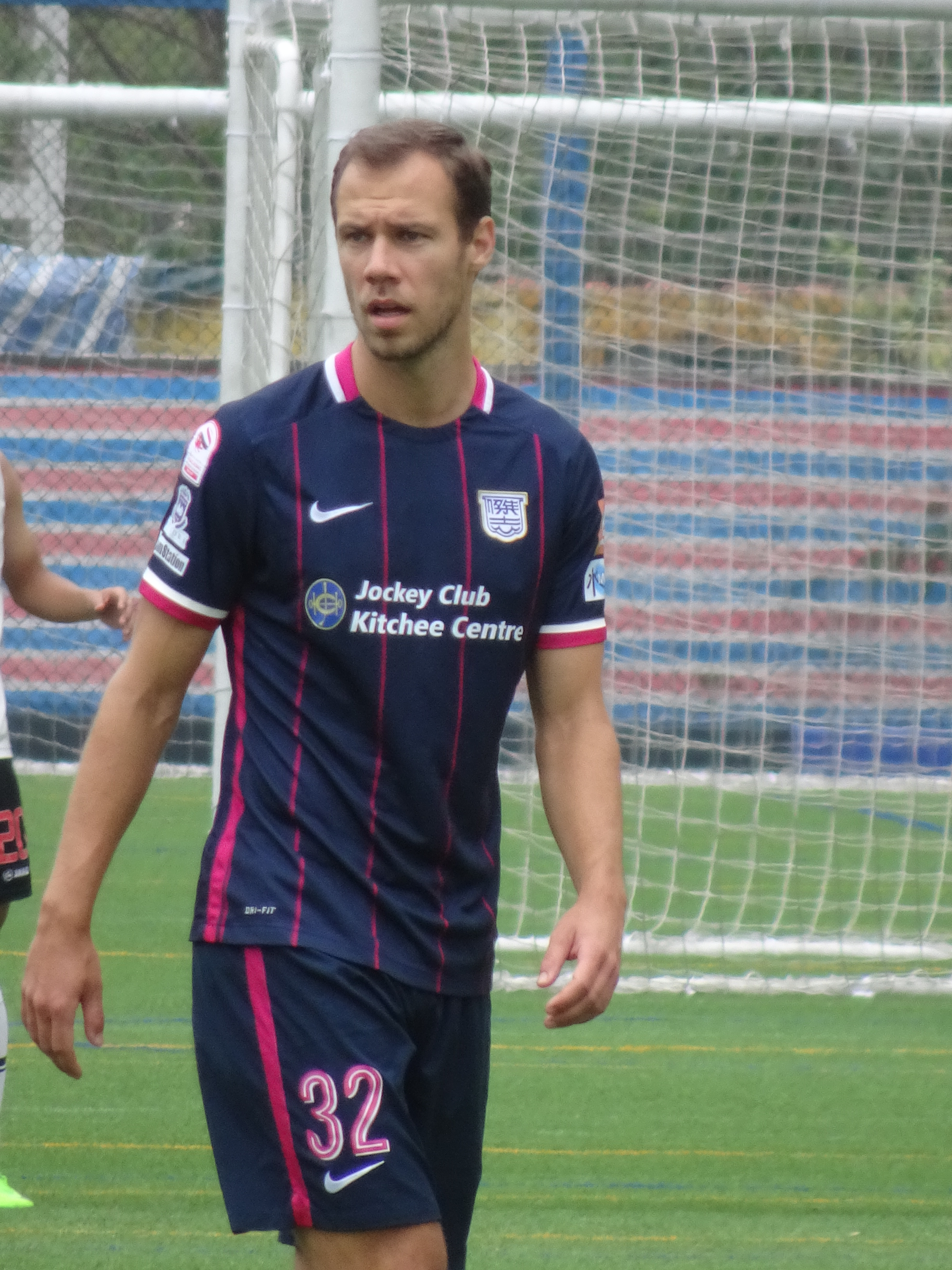
- Vadócz playing with Kitchee in 2017

Personal information
- Date of birth: 30 May 1985 (age 41)
- Place of birth: Budapest, Hungary
- Height: 1.88 m (6 ft 2 in)
- Position: Midfielder

Youth career
- Honvéd

Senior career*
Years	Team	Apps	(Gls)
2002–2005	Honvéd	72	(7)
2005–2007	Auxerre B	32	(2)
2007	→ Motherwell (loan)	11	(0)
2007–2008	NEC	28	(2)
2008–2011	Osasuna	71	(9)
2011–2012	NEC	29	(1)
2012–2014	Odense	36	(9)
2014	Pune City	6	(0)
2015	Grasshoppers	15	(2)
2015–2016	Alavés	3	(0)
2016	Perth Glory	11	(1)
2016	Mumbai City	14	(3)
2017–2018	Kitchee	27	(10)
2018	Honvéd	6	(0)
2018–2019	Kitchee	13	(3)
2019	Honvéd	11	(0)
2020–2021	Peñarol	24	(0)
2021	Montevideo Wanderers	9	(0)
2022	Central Español	8	(0)
2025	Episkopi		
2025	Kajaanin Haka	13	(4)

International career
2004–2006	Hungary U21	3	(0)
2004–2018	Hungary	42	(2)
- * Club domestic league appearances and goals as of 20:26, 14 October 2025 (UTC)

Krisztián Vadócz (Hungarian: [ˈkristiaːn ˈvɒdoːt͡s]; born 30 May 1985) is a Hungarian professional footballer who plays as a central midfielder.

== Club career ==
=== Early years ===
Born in Budapest, Vadócz made his professional debut aged 17 with hometown club Budapest Honvéd FC, and caught the eye of AJ Auxerre in summer 2005. However, he managed no Ligue 1 appearances in a two-year spell, finishing his last on loan to Motherwell in Scotland.

In June 2007, Vadócz was finally released by the French, joining NEC Nijmegen. During the season, he was an essential midfield element for a team that finished a comfortable eighth in the Eredivisie.

=== Osasuna ===
On 11 August 2008, Vadócz agreed to a four-year contract with CA Osasuna for a €950,000 transfer fee. Never an undisputed starter in his first season in La Liga, he did score important goals against UD Almería (3–1, after only playing one minute) and at Atlético Madrid (4–2).

In the 2009–10 campaign, Vadócz appeared in exactly the same number of matches for the Navarrese, again mainly from the bench. On 11 April 2010, he netted from 35 yards to help his team to a 2–0 home win over Real Zaragoza.

=== Later career ===
Vadócz was released by Osasuna in the last day of the 2011 summer transfer window, immediately signing with former side NEC. On 6 September 2012 he changed clubs and countries again, joining Odense Boldklub of the Danish Superliga.

On 14 November 2014, Vadócz moved to the Indian Super League with FC Pune City, as an injury replacement for John Goossens. On 16 February of the following year, he was signed by Grasshopper Club Zürich from the Swiss Super League.

On 3 April 2015, Vadócz scored twice against FC Sion to help to a 5–0 victory at the Stade Tourbillon. On 19 September he moved back to Spain, after agreeing to a one-year deal with Deportivo Alavés.

On 28 January 2016, after appearing rarely for the Basques, Vadócz terminated his contract and joined Perth Glory FC on an injury-replacement contract. At the end of the season, he was not offered a new deal and was released.

Vadócz signed for Mumbai City FC on 28 June 2016, thus returning to the Indian top division. Hong Kong Premier League's Kitchee SC announced his signing for six months the following 11 January, and on 8 June the 32-year-old renewed his contract with the latter until the end of the 2017–18 campaign, where he won the Hong Kong Footballer of the Year, Players' Player of the Year, Most Favourite Player and Top Midfielder awards.

Vadócz returned to his native Hungary on 5 July 2018, agreeing to a one-year deal with Honvéd. On 28 August, however, he terminated his contract by mutual consent because he opted to continue to play abroad.

Vadócz returned to Kitchee on 17 October 2018, with head coach Chu Chi Kwong confirming that the player had signed a multi-year contract. The following 27 August, he left.

After six months at Honvéd, Vadócz joined Peñarol of the Uruguayan Primera División on 4 January 2020, where he was reunited with former Mumbai City and Kitchee teammate Diego Forlán who acted as manager of the club. One year later, he signed for Montevideo Wanderers F.C. of the same country and league.

In 2025, Vadócz played amateur football with Episkopi F.C. in Greece and Kajaanin Haka in Finland.

== International career ==
Vadócz made his debut for both Hungary's under-21 and the full side in 2004. He scored his first goal for the latter a year later, in a 3–0 friendly win over Antigua and Barbuda in Miami.

== Career statistics ==
=== Club ===
As of 25 September 2022

Appearances and goals by club, season and competition
Club	Season	League			Cup		Continental		Other		Total	
Club	Season	Division	Apps	Goals	Apps	Goals	Apps	Goals	Apps	Goals	Apps	Goals
Honvéd	2002–03	Nemzeti Bajnokság I	13	0	1	1	1	0	—		15	1
Honvéd	2003–04	Nemzeti Bajnokság I	28	1	4	0	—		—		32	1
Honvéd	2004–05	Nemzeti Bajnokság I	28	5	3	2	4	0	—		35	7
Honvéd	2005–06	Nemzeti Bajnokság I	3	1	0	0	—		—		3	1
Honvéd	Total		72	7	8	3	5	0	—		85	10
Auxerre B	2005–06	Championnat de France Amateur	20	2	—		—		—		20	2
Auxerre B	2006–07	Championnat de France Amateur	12	0	—		—		—		12	0
Auxerre B	Total		32	2	—		—		—		32	2
Auxerre	2005–06	Ligue 1	0	0	0	0	0	0	0	0	0	0
Auxerre	2006–07	Ligue 1	0	0	0	0	0	0	0	0	0	0
Auxerre	Total		0	0	0	0	0	0	0	0	0	0
Motherwell (loan)	2006–07	Scottish Premier League	11	0	0	0	—		—		11	0
NEC	2007–08	Eredivisie	27	2	1	0	—		6	1	34	3
Osasuna	2008–09	La Liga	20	2	4	0	—		—		24	2
Osasuna	2009–10	La Liga	20	4	3	0	—		—		23	4
Osasuna	2010–11	La Liga	31	3	2	0	—		—		33	3
Osasuna	Total		71	9	9	0	—		—		80	9
NEC	2011–12	Eredivisie	29	1	4	2	—		2	0	35	3
Odense	2012–13	Danish Superliga	24	7	2	0	—		—		26	7
Odense	2013–14	Danish Superliga	12	2	2	0	—		—		14	2
Odense	Total		36	9	4	0	—		—		40	9
Pune City	2014	Indian Super League	6	0	—		—		—		6	0
Grasshoppers	2014–15	Swiss Super League	15	2	1	0	—		—		16	2
Alavés	2015–16	Segunda División	3	0	1	0	—		—		4	0
Perth Glory	2015–16	A-League	11	1	—		—		—		11	1
Mumbai City	2016	Indian Super League	16	3	—		—		—		16	3
Kitchee	2016–17	Hong Kong Premier League	9	2	3	0	2	0	2	0	16	2
Kitchee	2017–18	Hong Kong Premier League	18	8	3	0	6	0	7	3	34	11
Kitchee	Total		27	10	6	0	8	0	9	3	50	13
Honvéd	2018–19	Nemzeti Bajnokság I	6	0	—		4	0	—		10	0
Kitchee	2018–19	Hong Kong Premier League	13	3	3	1	7	0	6	2	29	6
Honvéd	2019–20	Nemzeti Bajnokság I	11	0	3	1	—		—		14	1
Peñarol	2020	Uruguayan Primera División	24	0	—		5	0	—		29	0
Montevideo Wanderers	2021	Uruguayan Primera División	9	0	—		0	0	1	0	10	0
Central Español	2022	Uruguayan Segunda División	8	0	1	0	—		2	0	11	0
Career total			427	49	41	7	29	0	26	6	523	62

=== International goals ===
Scores and results list Hungary's goal tally first, score column indicates score after each Vadócz goal.

No	Date	Venue	Opponent	Score	Result	Competition
1.	18 December 2005	Riccardo Silva Stadium, Miami, United States	Antigua and Barbuda	1–0	3–0	Friendly
2.	24 May 2008	Ferenc Puskás Stadium, Budapest, Hungary	Greece	3–1	3–2	Friendly

== Honours ==
Honvéd

- Hungarian Cup runner-up: 2003–04

Kitchee

- Hong Kong Premier League: 2016–17, 2017–18
- Hong Kong Senior Challenge Shield: 2016–17, 2018–19
- Hong Kong FA Cup: 2016–17, 2017–18, 2018–19
- Sapling Cup: 2017–18
- Hong Kong Community Shield: 2017

Individual

- Hong Kong Footballer of the Year: 2018
