= Abhinas Ruidas =

Indian footballer (born 1995)

Abinas Ruidas
Personal information
- Date of birth: 12 September 1995 (age 31)
- Place of birth: Budge Budge, West Bengal, India
- Position: Left winger

Team information
- Current team: Madan Maharaj

Youth career
- Mohun Bagan
- Bhawanipore
- East Bengal

Senior career*
Years	Team	Apps	(Gls)
2014–2017	East Bengal	41	(2)
2016	Atlético de Kolkata (loan)	7	(0)
2017–2018	Mumbai City	11	(0)
2018–2019	Mohun Bagan	5	(0)
2019–2020	TRAU	1	(0)
2020–2021	RG Punjab		
2021-	Madan Maharaj		

International career
2015	India U23	3	(0)
- * Club domestic league appearances and goals

Abinas Ruidas is an Indian professional footballer who plays as a left winger for Madan Maharaj.

== Career ==
=== East Bengal ===
Born in Budge Budge, West Bengal, Ruidas began his career with the youth sides at Mohun Bagan and Bhawanipore. He eventually joined I-League club East Bengal and played for the club in the Calcutta Football League where he impressed pundits and coaches as East Bengal won the state league. Despite his impressive performance in the Calcutta Football League, Ruidas was left out of the squad for the team's Federation Cup campaign.

Ruidas then made his professional debut on 18 January 2015 in East Bengal's first match of the I-League season against Sporting Goa. He started the match and played 72 minutes as East Bengal drew the match 1–1. He then scored his first professional goal for East Bengal in the team's next game against reigning I-League champions Bengaluru FC. His 53rd-minute strike at the Salt Lake Stadium was the sole goal in a 1–0 victory.

== International ==
Abinash debuted for the India U23s against Uzbekistan U23s on 27 March 2015 in an AFC U-23 qualifier in Dhaka's Bangabandhu National Stadium.

== Career statistics ==
As of 24 May 2015

Club	Season	League			Federation Cup		Durand Cup		AFC		Total	
Club	Season	Division	Apps	Goals	Apps	Goals	Apps	Goals	Apps	Goals	Apps	Goals
East Bengal	2014–15	I-League	7	1	0	0	—	—	0	0	7	1
Career total			7	1	0	0	0	0	0	0	7	1

== Honours ==
=== Club ===
Mohun Bagan

- Calcutta Football League (1): 2018–19
