= Léo Costa (footballer, born 1986) =

Brazilian footballer

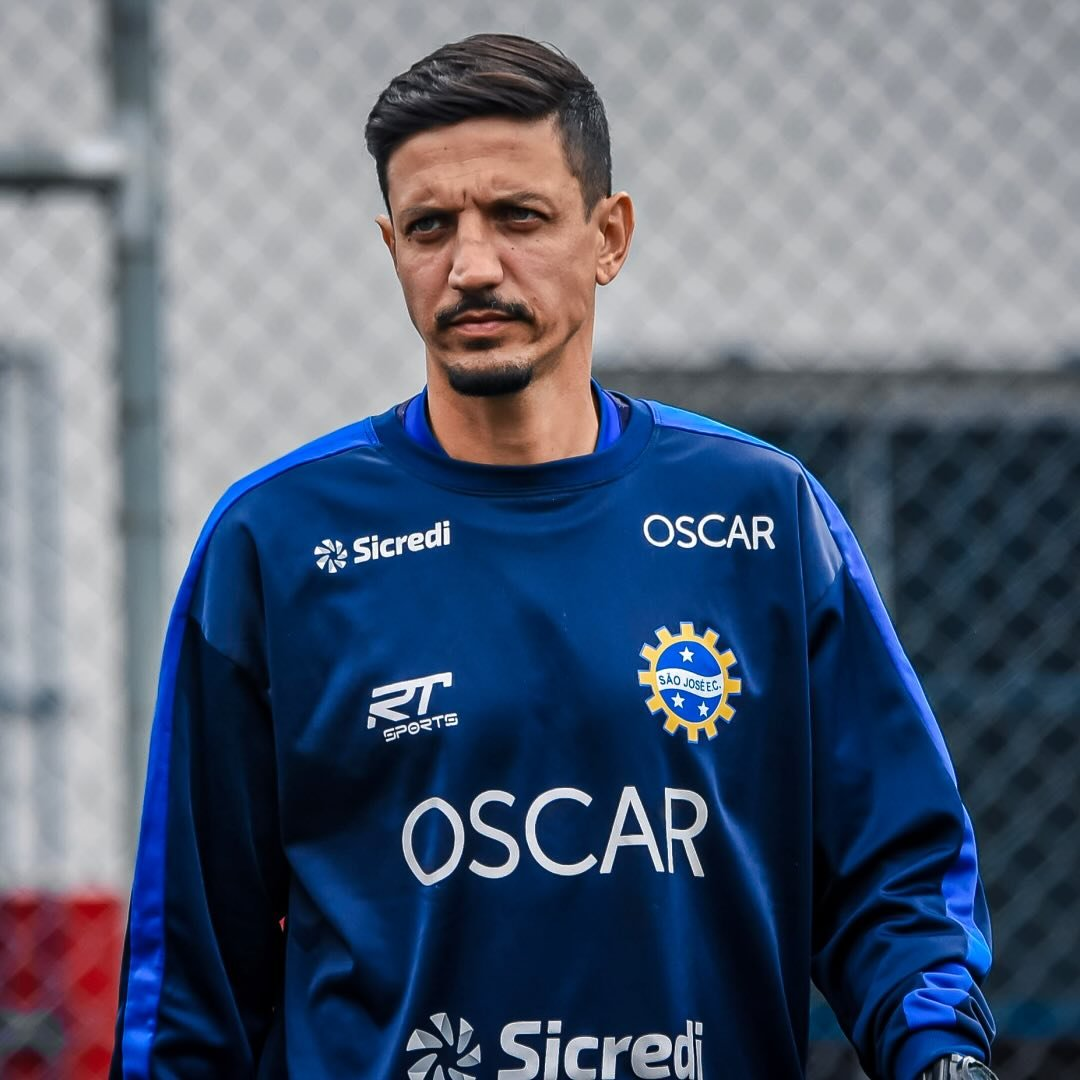
- Leo Costa with São José as the U17 coach

Personal information
- Full name: Leonardo Fabrício Soares da Costa
- Date of birth: 3 March 1986 (age 40)
- Place of birth: São José dos Campos, Brazil
- Height: 1.81 m (5 ft 11 in)
- Position: Attacking midfielder

Team information
- Current team: São José U17 (manager)

Youth career
- –2006: Santo André

Senior career*
| Years | Team | Apps | (Gls) |
| 2006–2008 | Santo André | 19 | (1) |
| 2008 | → São Bernardo (loan) | 23 | (3) |
| 2009 | Paulista | 8 | (1) |
| 2009 | Brno | 9 | (0) |
| 2010 | União São João | 15 | (1) |
| 2010–2011 | Linense | 17 | (3) |
| 2011 | Itumbiara | 3 | (0) |
| 2012 | São Bernardo | 23 | (3) |
| 2012 | Juventus-SP | 13 | (2) |
| 2012 | Vila Nova | 3 | (0) |
| 2013 | Rio Branco | 5 | (0) |
| 2013 | Guarani | 13 | (0) |
| 2014 | Rio Claro | 12 | (9) |
| 2014 | Vitória | 5 | (0) |
| 2014–2015 | Portuguesa | 28 | (3) |
| 2015 | Ponte Preta | 2 | (0) |
| 2016 | Rio Claro | 12 | (2) |
| 2016–2017 | Mumbai City | 10 | (2) |
| 2017 | Santa Cruz | 9 | (1) |
| 2018 | Mumbai City | 9 | (1) |
| 2019 | Pelotas | 10 | (2) |
| 2019 | EC São Bernardo | 2 | (0) |
| 2019 | → Figueirense (loan) | 1 | (0) |
| 2020–2021 | Portuguesa Santista | 25 | (3) |
| 2021 | São Bento | 7 | (0) |
| 2022 | Patrocinense | 8 | (0) |
| 2023 | Lemense FC | 8 | (0) |
| Total | | 299 | (37) |

Managerial career
- 2024–: São José U17
- * Club domestic league appearances and goals

Leonardo Fabrício "Léo" Soares da Costa (born 3 March 1986) is a Brazilian football manager and former player who is the manager of the under-17 team of Campeonato Brasileiro Série D club São José.

== Career ==
Born in São José dos Campos, São Paulo, Léo Costa graduated with Santo André, being promoted to the main squad in 2007. In 2008, he was loaned to São Bernardo, and was subsequently released by his parent club in December of that year.

In July 2009, after a short stint at Paulista, Léo Costa moved abroad for the first time in his career, joining Czech side Brno. He returned to his homeland in the following year, signing for União São João.

In August 2010 Léo Costa moved to Linense, appearing with the club in Copa Paulista and Campeonato Paulista. He later played for clubs mainly in his native state, representing Itumbiara, São Bernardo, Vila Nova, Rio Branco, Guarani and Rio Claro; with the latter he was the top scorer of 2014 Campeonato Paulista, scoring nine goals.

On 28 April 2014 Léo Costa signed for Série A's Vitória. He made his debut in the competition on 11 May, coming on as a second half substitute in a 1–1 away draw against fierce rivals Bahia.

On 16 September, after appearing in only five matches, Léo Costa rescinded his link with Leão, and joined Portuguesa three days later.

On 22 May 2024 he started at São José Esporte Clube as an under-17 coach.
