= 2016 Kerala Blasters FC season =

3rd season in existence of Kerala Blasters FC

Kerala Blasters
2016 season
- Head Coach: Steve Coppell
- Stadium: Jawaharlal Nehru Stadium
- Indian Super League: 2nd
- Finals: Runners-Up
- Top goalscorer: League: C.K. Vineeth (5 goals); All: C.K. Vineeth (5 goals)
- Highest home attendance: 80,294
- Average home league attendance: 55,535
Home colours	Away colours

The 2016 season was the third season in Kerala Blasters FC's existence, as well as their third season in Indian Super League. After finishing second position in the league stage, the club managed to make it to the final. In the finals, they were again defeated by Atlético de Kolkata, this time through the penalty shoot-out.

== Background ==
In 2016, in an effort to rebuild after failing to qualify for the finals the previous season, Kerala Blasters announced the signing of former Crystal Palace manager Steve Coppell as head coach on 21 June 2016. A week later, the club announced the signing of Northern Ireland international Aaron Hughes as their marquee player for the season. Other moves made before the season included the signing of Graham Stack, Kervens Belfort, Duckens Nazon, and Mohammed Rafique and return of former players Michael Chopra and Cédric Hengbart.

The season began where the previous left off, with a 1–0 defeat away from home against NorthEast United. After the first month of the season, the Blasters had one of the best defenses statistically in the league but struggled in attack. In the second half of the season, after the return of C.K. Vineeth from loan with Bengaluru FC, the Blasters managed to surge their way into the playoffs. They achieved this by defeating Delhi Dynamos 3–0 in a penalty shootout during the semi-final. In the final, the Kerala Blasters would play host to Atlético de Kolkata. The Blasters took the lead early through Mohammed Rafi before Kolkata equalized soon after. The match went into a penalty shootout, Despite taking the lead early in the shootout, the Kerala Blasters lost 4–3 and thus were defeated in their second final in three seasons.

== Players ==
=== Squad ===
Note: Flags indicate national team as defined under FIFA eligibility rules; some limited exceptions apply. Players may hold more than one non-FIFA nationality.

No.	Pos.	Nation	Player
1	GK	IRL	Graham Stack
2	DF	IND	Pratik Chowdhary
5	DF	FRA	Cédric Hengbart
6	DF	NIR	Aaron Hughes
7	MF	IND	Mohammed Rafique
8	MF	IND	Vinit Rai
9	FW	HAI	Kervens Belfort
10	FW	GRN	Antonio German
11	MF	IND	Ishfaq Ahmed
12	FW	IND	Thongkhosiem Haokip
13	FW	IND	C.K. Vineeth
14	MF	IND	Mehtab Hossain
16	DF	IND	Gurwinder Singh
17	FW	IND	Farukh Choudhary

No.	Pos.	Nation	Player
19	DF	SEN	Elhadji Ndoye
20	FW	IND	Mohammed Rafi
21	DF	IND	Sandesh Jhingan
22	FW	IND	Prasanth Karuthadathkuni
23	GK	IND	Kunal Sawant
24	GK	IND	Sandip Nandy
27	FW	ENG	Michael Chopra
30	GK	IND	Mohammad Ansari
31	DF	IND	Rino Anto
57	MF	CIV	Didier Kadio
78	FW	HAI	Duckens Nazon
88	MF	CHA	Azrack Mahamat
99	DF	ESP	Josu

Source: Indian Super League 2016

== Transfers ==
=== Retained ===
==== Foreign players ====
Position	Player
MF	(Spain) Josu
FW	(England) Antonio German

==== Indian players ====
Position	Player
GK	(India) Sandip Nandy
DF	(India) Gurwinder Singh
DF	(India) Sandesh Jhingan
MF	(India) C.K. Vineeth
MF	(India) Ishfaq Ahmed
MF	(India) Mehtab Hossain
FW	(India) Mohammed Rafi

=== New signings ===
Position	Player	Last club	Date	Ref
FW	(India) Thongkhosiem Haokip	(India) Goa	7 July 2016	
DF	(India) Pratik Chowdhary	(India) Mumbai	13 July 2016	
DF	(Northern Ireland) Aaron Hughes	(Australia) Melbourne City	28 July 2016	
GK	(Republic of Ireland) Graham Stack	(England) Barnet	3 August 2016	
FW	(England) Michael Chopra	(Scotland) Alloa Athletic	7 August 2016	
DF	(Senegal) Elhadji Ndoye	(Kazakhstan) Kyzylzhar	9 August 2016	
FW	(Haiti) Kervens Belfort	(Turkey) 1461 Trabzon	12 August 2016	
DF	(France) Cédric Hengbart	(India) NorthEast United	16 August 2016	
MF	(India) Mohammed Rafique	(India) Atlético de Kolkata	22 August 2016	
MF	(Chad) Azrack Mahamat	(Greece) Levadiakos	23 August 2016	
DF	(India) Rino Anto	(India) Atlético de Kolkata	26 August 2016	
MF	(Ivory Coast) Didier Kadio	(Kazakhstan) Zhetysu	30 August 2016	
MF	(India) Vinit Rai	(India) Dempo	2 September 2016	
FW	(Haiti) Duckens Nazon	(Portugal) Tondela	6 September 2016	
GK	(India) Kunal Sawant	(India) Mumbai	7 September 2016	
GK	(India) Mohammad Ansari	(India) Pune	7 September 2016	
FW	(India) Prasanth Karuthadathkuni	(India) AIFF Elite Academy	7 September 2016	
FW	(India) Farukh Choudhary	(India) Lonestar Kashmir	7 September 2016	

== Pre-season ==
12 September 2016 Friendly	BBCU (Thailand)	1–2	(India) Kerala Blasters	Bangkok
		Report

15 September 2016 Friendly	Bangkok United (Thailand)	0–0	(India) Kerala Blasters	Bangkok
		Report

24 September 2016 Friendly	Southern Samity (India)	1–1	(India) Kerala Blasters	Kolkata
		Report

== Indian Super League ==
Pos	Team	Pld	W	D	L	GF	GA	GD	Pts	Qualification
1	Mumbai City	14	6	5	3	16	8	+8	23	Advance to ISL Play-offs
2	Kerala Blasters	14	6	4	4	12	14	−2	22	Advance to ISL Play-offs
3	Delhi Dynamos	14	5	6	3	27	17	+10	21	Advance to ISL Play-offs
4	Atlético de Kolkata (C)	14	4	8	2	16	14	+2	20	Advance to ISL Play-offs
5	NorthEast United	14	5	3	6	14	14	0	18	

Source: Indian Super League
Rules for classification: 1) points; 2) head-to-head points; 3) head-to-head goal difference; 4) goal difference; 5) number of goals scored; 6) play-off match
(C) Champions

=== Results summary ===
Overall								Home						Away					
Pld	W	D	L	GF	GA	GD	Pts	W	D	L	GF	GA	GD	W	D	L	GF	GA	GD
14	6	4	4	13	15	−2	22	5	1	1	9	4	+5	1	3	3	4	11	−7

Source: https://www.soccerway.com/team/kerala-blasters/hAtROhM3/fixtures/

=== Results ===
1 October 2016 1	NorthEast United	1–0	Kerala Blasters	Guwahati
19:00 IST	Yusa 55'	Report		Stadium: Indira Gandhi Athletic Stadium; Attendance: 27,629; Referee: Pranjal Banerji

5 October 2016 2	Kerala Blasters	0–1	Atlético de Kolkata	Kochi
19:00 IST		Report	Lara 53'	Stadium: Jawaharlal Nehru Stadium; Attendance: 54,900; Referee: Umesh Bora

9 October 2016 3	Kerala Blasters	0–0	Delhi Dynamos	Kochi
19:00 IST		Report		Stadium: Jawaharlal Nehru Stadium; Attendance: 54,913; Referee: Tejas Nagvenkar

14 October 2016 4	Kerala Blasters	1–0	Mumbai City	Kochi
19:00 IST	Chopra 58'	Report		Stadium: Jawaharlal Nehru Stadium; Attendance: 40,013; Referee: Ajit Dutta

17 October 2016 5	Pune City	1–1	Kerala Blasters	Pune
19:00 IST	Sissoko 68'	Report	Hengbart 3'	Stadium: Balewadi Stadium; Attendance: 8,556; Referee: Ajit Meetei

24 October 2016 6	Goa	1–2	Kerala Blasters	Margao
19:00 IST	César 24'	Report	Rafi 46'; Belfort 84'	Stadium: Fatorda Stadium; Attendance: 18,157; Referee: C. R. Srikrishna

29 October 2016 7	Chennaiyin	0–0	Kerala Blasters	Chennai
19:00 IST		Report		Stadium: Jawaharlal Nehru Stadium; Attendance: 23,163; Referee: Pranjal Banerjee

4 November 2014 8	Delhi Dynamos	2–0	Kerala Blasters	Delhi
19:00 IST	Lewis 56'; Marcelinho 60'	Report		Stadium: Jawaharlal Nehru Stadium; Attendance: 15,471; Referee: Nick Waldron

8 November 2016 9	Kerala Blasters	2–1	Goa	Kochi
19:00 IST	Belfort 48' (pen.); Vineeth 90+9'	Report	Coelho 9'	Stadium: Jawaharlal Nehru Stadium; Attendance: 34,196; Referee: Nick Waldron

12 November 2016 10	Kerala Blasters	3–1	Chennaiyin	Kochi
19:00 IST	Kadio 66'; Vineeth 85', 89'	Report	Mendy 22'	Stadium: Jawaharlal Nehru Stadium; Attendance: 53,152; Referee: Nivon Robesh Gamini

19 November 2016 11	Mumbai City	5–0	Kerala Blasters	Mumbai
19:00 IST	Forlán 5', 14', 63'; Alves 69'; Goian 73'	Report		Stadium: Mumbai Football Arena; Attendance: 7583

25 November 2016 12	Kerala Blasters	2–1	Pune City	Kochi
19:00 IST	Nazon 7'; Hughes 57'	Report	Zurdo 90+5'	Stadium: Jawaharlal Nehru Stadium; Attendance: 51341

29 November 2016 13	Atlético de Kolkata	1–1	Kerala Blasters	Kolkata
19:00 IST	Stephen Pearson 18'		C.K. Vineeth 8'	Stadium: Rabindra Sarobar Stadium

4 December 2016 14	Kerala Blasters	1–0	NorthEast United	Kochi
19:00 IST	C.K. Vineeth 66'			Stadium: Jawaharlal Nehru Stadium; Attendance: 53000

== Player statistics ==
Season stats
#	Position	Player	GP	G
1	GK	(Republic of Ireland) Graham Stack	8	0
2	DF	(India) Pratik Chowdhary	8	0
5	DF	(France) Cédric Hengbart	17	1
6	DF	(Northern Ireland) Aaron Hughes	11	1
7	MF	(India) Mohammed Rafique	10	0
8	MF	(India) Vinit Rai	2	0
9	FW	(Haiti) Kervens Belfort	15	3
10	FW	(England) Antonio German	14	0
11	MF	(India) Ishfaq Ahmed	9	0
12	FW	(India) Thongkhosiem Haokip	1	0
13	FW	(India) C.K. Vineeth	9	5
14	MF	(India) Mehtab Hossain	16	0
16	DF	(India) Gurwinder Singh	1	0
17	FW	(India) Farukh Choudhary	2	0
19	DF	(Senegal) Elhadji Ndoye	5	0
20	FW	(India) Mohammed Rafi	13	2
21	DF	(India) Sandesh Jhingan	17	0
22	FW	(India) Prasanth Karuthadathkuni	0	0
23	GK	(India) Kunal Sawant	0	0
24	GK	(India) Sandip Nandy	10	0
27	FW	(England) Michael Chopra	10	1
30	GK	(India) Mohammad Ansari	0	0
31	DF	(India) Rino Anto	3	0
57	MF	(Ivory Coast) Didier Kadio	12	1
78	FW	(Haiti) Duckens Nazon	13	2
88	MF	(Chad) Azrack Mahamat	14	0
99	DF	(Spain) Josu	14	0

== See also ==
- 2016–17 in Indian football
