= 2016 Indian Super League final =

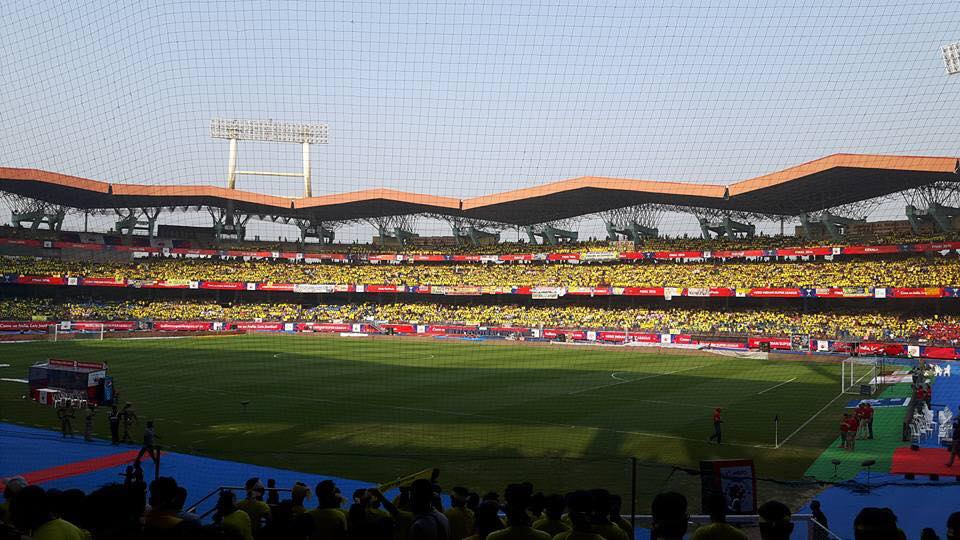
- The Jawaharlal Nehru Stadium, before the final
- Event: 2016 Indian Super League
Kerala Blasters	ATK
(India)	(India)
1	1
- ATK won 4–3 on penalties (p)
- Date: 18 December 2016
- Venue: Jawaharlal Nehru Stadium, Kochi, Kerala
- Man of the Match: Henrique Sereno
- Referee: Alireza Faghani (Iran)
- Attendance: 82,324

The 2016 Indian Super League final was a football match between ATK and Kerala Blasters on 18 December 2016 at the Jawaharlal Nehru Stadium in Kochi, Kerala. It was the final match of the 2016 Indian Super League, the third season of the Indian Super League. The match was the second time these two teams played against each other in the Indian Super League final, the previous one was when both sides met in the inaugural 2014 final. ATK won that final 1–0.

Kerala Blasters reached the playoffs after finishing the regular season in second place. ATK finished their regular season in fourth place. In the semi-finals, Kerala Blasters took on the Delhi Dynamos while ATK played against Mumbai City. ATK hosted Mumbai City in the first match of the finals at the Rabindra Sarobar Stadium. Helped by a brace from Iain Hume, ATK won the first leg 3–2. The team then secured their place in the final after a 0–0 draw in Mumbai. The Kerala Blasters hosted Delhi Dynamos in their first match of the finals at the Jawaharlal Nehru Stadium and won 1–0. In the second leg, the Blasters were defeated 2–1 and thus the score remaining 3–3 on aggregate the match went to a penalty shootout as away goal rule was not applicable in case of Indian Super League. The Kerala Blasters won the shootout 3–0 to qualify for the final.

Watched by a crowd of 82,324 even though officially another figure of much lower number is given which was even less than some normal league matches conducted here in Kaloor Stadium during 2014–2016 time, the Kerala Blasters took the lead in the 37th minute through Mohammed Rafi. The Kerala Blasters lead only lasted for seven minutes before Henrique Sereno equalized for ATK. At halftime the score was 1–1. The second half did not see any goals scored and thus the match went into extra-time. The first half of extra-time was goalless and so was the second half. With the score still remaining1–1 after extra-time, the match went into penalties.

Penalty shoot out drama saw Graham Stack saving the first shot for ATK which gave a temporary lead for Kerala but Ndyoe blasted the ball over the bar and finally Cédric Hengbart saw his shot getting saved by the trailing leg of ATK keeper Debjit Majumder, ATK won the shoot-out 4–3 as Jewel Raja scored the winning penalty and they won the Indian Super League Final for the second time in three seasons.

== Match ==
18 December
19:00 IST

Kerala Blasters	1–1 (a.e.t.)	ATK
Rafi 37'	Report	Sereno 44'
Penalties
German (penalty scored); Belfort (penalty scored); Ndoye (penalty missed); Rafique (penalty scored); Hengbart (penalty missed)	3–4	(penalty missed) Hume; (penalty scored) Doutie; (penalty scored) Fernández; (penalty scored) Lara; (penalty scored) Raja

Jawaharlal Nehru Stadium, Kochi
Attendance: 82,324
Referee: Alireza Faghani (Iran)

Kerala Blasters	ATK

GK	1	(Republic of Ireland) Graham Stack
RB	21	(India) Sandesh Jhingan	(yellow card) 100'
CB	6	(Northern Ireland) Aaron Hughes (c)		(substituted off) 36'
CB	5	(France) Cédric Hengbart	(yellow card) 119'
LB	11	(India) Ishfaq Ahmed	(yellow card) 93'
RM	13	(India) C.K. Vineeth
CM	14	(India) Mehtab Hossain
CM	88	(Chad) Azrack Mahamat
LM	20	(India) Mohammed Rafi		(substituted off) 77'
SS	9	(Haiti) Kervens Belfort
CF	78	(Haiti) Duckens Nazon		(substituted off) 77'
Substitutes:
GK	24	(India) Sandip Nandy
DF	19	(Senegal) Elhadji Ndoye		(substituted on) 36'
FW	7	(India) Mohammed Rafique		(substituted on) 77'
FW	10	(England) Antonio German		(substituted on) 77'
MF	2	(India) Pratik Chowdhary
MF	8	(India) Vinit Rai
FW	12	(India) Thongkhosiem Haokip
MF	16	(India) Gurwinder Singh
MF	27	(England) Michael Chopra
FW	31	(India) Rino Anto
MF	57	(Ivory Coast) Didier Kadio
Manager:
(England) Steve Coppell

GK	24	(India) Debjit Majumder
RB	12	(India) Pritam Kotal	(yellow card) 100'
CB	2	(Portugal) Henrique Sereno		(substituted off) 95'
CB	4	(Spain) Tiri
LB	80	(India) Keegan Pereira		(substituted off) 43'
RM	11	(South Africa) Sameehg Doutie
CM	10	(Spain) Borja Fernández (c)	(yellow card) 25'
CM	8	(India) Jewel Raja
LM	20	(India) Lalrindika Ralte
SS	9	(Portugal) Hélder Postiga		(substituted off) 67'
CF	7	(Canada) Iain Hume
Substitutes:
GK	14	(Spain) Dani Mallo
GK	22	(India) Shilton Paul
DF	33	(India) Prabir Das		(substituted on) 43'
MF	15	(Spain) Javi Lara		(substituted on) 67'
MF	23	(Botswana) Ofentse Nato		(substituted on) 95'
DF	6	(India) Kingshuk Debnath
MF	13	(India) Bikramjit Singh
MF	17	(India) Bidyananda Singh
MF	25	(Scotland) Stephen Pearson
MF	34	(India) Abhinas Ruidas
Manager:
(Spain) José Francisco Molina

Hero of the match

- Henrique Sereno (ATK)

Emerging player of the match

- Lalrindika Ralte (ATK)

Match rules

- 90 minutes.
- 30 minutes of extra time if necessary.
- Penalty shoot-out if scores still level.
- Seven named substitutes.
- Maximum of three substitutions.
