= 2016 Indian Super League =

3rd season of the Indian Super League

Indian Super League
- Season: 2016
- Dates: 1 October – 18 December
- Champions: Atletico de Kolkata (2nd title)
- Matches: 61
- Goals: 145 (2.38 per match)
- Top goalscorer: Marcelinho (10 goals)
- Best goalkeeper: Amrinder Singh (180 mins per goal)
- Biggest home win: Mumbai City 5–0 Kerala Blasters (19 November)
- Biggest away win: Chennaiyin 1–3 Delhi Dynamos (6 October)
- Highest scoring: Goa 5–4 Chennaiyin (1 December)
- Longest winning run: Delhi Dynamos (3 matches)
- Longest unbeaten run: Atlético de Kolkata (6 matches)
- Longest winless run: Pune City; NorthEast United; Chennaiyin (5 matches)
- Longest losing run: NorthEast United (4 matches)
- Highest attendance: 82,224; Kerala Blasters 1–1 Atlètico de Kolkata (18 December)
- Lowest attendance: 6,147; Mumbai City 1–0 NorthEast United (7 October)
- Total attendance: 1,260,207
- Average attendance: 21,003

The 2016 Indian Super League season was the third season of the Indian Super League, the football league, since its establishment in 2013. The season featured eight teams again, each playing 14 matches during the regular season before the finals. The regular season began on 1 October and ended on 4 December. The finals began on 10 December and concluded with the final on 18 December. The defending champions coming into the season were Chennaiyin.

At the end of the season, Atlético de Kolkata were crowned champions after defeating the Kerala Blasters in a penalty shootout, 4–3, during the final. The match had ended 1–1 after ninety minutes and extra time.

== Teams ==
Locations of the ISL Teams

=== Stadiums and locations ===
Team	City/State	Stadium	Capacity
Atlético de Kolkata	Kolkata, West Bengal	Rabindra Sarobar Stadium	12,750
Chennaiyin	Chennai, Tamil Nadu	Jawaharlal Nehru Stadium	26,976
Delhi Dynamos	Delhi	Jawaharlal Nehru Stadium	34,230
Goa	Margao, Goa	Fatorda Stadium	19,088
Kerala Blasters	Kochi, Kerala	Jawaharlal Nehru Stadium	61,148
Mumbai City	Mumbai, Maharashtra	Mumbai Football Arena	7,690
NorthEast United	Guwahati, Assam	Indira Gandhi Athletic Stadium	25,549
Pune City	Pune, Maharashtra	Balewadi Stadium	9,110

=== Personnel and kits ===
Team	Head coach	Kit manufacturer	Shirt sponsor
Atlético de Kolkata	(Spain) José Francisco Molina	Nivia	Birla Tyres
Chennaiyin	(Italy) Marco Materazzi	Puma	TVS Tyres
Delhi Dynamos	(Italy) Gianluca Zambrotta	Dryworld	GMS Leadership
Goa	(Brazil) Zico	Umbro	Deltin
Kerala Blasters	(England) Steve Coppell	—	Muthoot
Mumbai City	(Costa Rica) Alexandre Guimarães	Puma	Ace Group
NorthEast United	(Portugal) Nelo Vingada	Performax	HTC
Pune City	(Spain) Antonio López Habas	Adidas	DHFL

=== Managerial changes ===
Team	Outgoing manager	Manner of departure	Date of vacancy	Position in table	Incoming manager	Date of appointment
Mumbai City	(France) Nicolas Anelka	Contract finished	20 December 2015	Pre-season	(Costa Rica) Alexandre Guimarães	19 April 2016
Pune City	(England) David Platt	Contract finished	20 December 2015	Pre-season	(Spain) Antonio López Habas	25 April 2016
Atlético de Kolkata	(Spain) Antonio López Habas	Contract finished	20 December 2015	Pre-season	(Spain) José Francisco Molina	5 May 2016
NorthEast United	(Venezuela) César Farías	Contract finished	20 December 2015	Pre-season	(Brazil) Sérgio Farias	13 May 2016
Kerala Blasters	(Republic of Ireland) Terry Phelan	Contract finished	20 December 2015	Pre-season	(England) Steve Coppell	21 June 2016
Delhi Dynamos	(Brazil) Roberto Carlos	Contract finished	20 December 2015	Pre-season	(Italy) Gianluca Zambrotta	5 July 2016
NorthEast United	(Brazil) Sérgio Farias	Moved to Suphanburi	9 July 2016	Pre-season	(Portugal) Nelo Vingada	16 July 2016

=== Marquee players ===
Team	Marquee
Atlético de Kolkata	(Portugal) Hélder Postiga
Chennaiyin	(Norway) John Arne Riise
Delhi Dynamos	(France) Florent Malouda
Goa	(Brazil) Lúcio
Kerala Blasters	(Northern Ireland) Aaron Hughes
Mumbai City	(Uruguay) Diego Forlán
NorthEast United	(Ivory Coast) Didier Zokora
Pune City	(Mali) Mohamed Sissoko

== Foreign players ==
Besides the marquee player, each Indian Super League side must sign at least eight foreign players with the maximum capped at 10.

Atlético de Kolkata (10)	Chennaiyin (10)	Delhi Dynamos (10)	Goa (9)
(Canada) Iain Hume (Botswana) Ofentse Nato (South Africa) Sameehg Doutie (Spain) Tiri (Scotland) Stephen Pearson (Spain) Dani Mallo (Spain) Javi Lara (Spain) Borja Fernández (Spain) Juan Belencoso (Portugal) Henrique Sereno	(France) Bernard Mendy (Brazil) Raphael Augusto (Brazil) Éder (Italy) Manuele Blasi (Netherlands) Hans Mulder (Italy) Davide Succi (Italy) Maurizio Peluso (Brazil) Eli Sabiá (Jamaica) Duwayne Kerr (Nigeria) Dudu Omagbemi	(Spain) Toni Doblas (Brazil) Bruno Pelissari (Brazil) Marcelinho (Spain) Marcos Tébar (Ghana) David Addy (Spain) Rubén (Brazil) Memo (Ghana) Richard Gadze (Senegal) Ibrahima Niasse (Senegal) Badara Badji	(Spain) Jofre Mateu (Brazil) Reinaldo (Martinique) Grégory Arnolin (Brazil) Luciano Sabrosa (Brazil) Rafael Coelho (Brazil) Rafael Dumas (Brazil) Matheus Goncalves (Brazil) Richarlyson (Brazil) Júlio César
Kerala Blasters (10)	Mumbai City (10)	NorthEast United (10)	Pune City (10)
(Grenada) Antonio German (Spain) Josu (Republic of Ireland) Graham Stack (England) Michael Chopra (Senegal) Elhadji Ndoye (Haiti) Kervens Belfort (France) Cédric Hengbart (Chad) Azrack Mahamat (Ivory Coast) Didier Kadio (Haiti) Duckens Nazon	(Haiti) Sony Norde (Argentina) Matías Defederico (Hungary) Krisztián Vadócz (Brazil) Gerson Vieira (Brazil) Léo Costa (Romania) Lucian Goian (Brazil) Roberto Volpato (Brazil) Cafu (Argentina) Facundo Cardozo (Brazil) Thiago Cunha	(Japan) Katsumi Yusa (Brazil) Maílson Alves (Uruguay) Sasha Aneff (Argentina) Nicolás Vélez (Brazil) Gustavo Lazzaretti (Brazil) Wellington Priori (Ivory Coast) Romaric (Brazil) Wellington de Lima Gomes (Uruguay) Emiliano Alfaro (Japan) Robert Cullen	(Spain) Pitu (Brazil) Jonatan Lucca (Equatorial Guinea) Eduardo Ferreira (Senegal) Momar Ndoye (Spain) Bruno (Armenia) Apoula Edel (Mexico) Aníbal Zurdo (Argentina) Gustavo Oberman (Spain) Jesús Tato (Mali) Dramane Traoré

== Regular season ==
=== League table ===
Pos	Team	Pld	W	D	L	GF	GA	GD	Pts	Qualification
1	Mumbai City	14	6	5	3	16	8	+8	23	Advance to ISL Play-offs
2	Kerala Blasters	14	6	4	4	12	14	−2	22	Advance to ISL Play-offs
3	Delhi Dynamos	14	5	6	3	27	17	+10	21	Advance to ISL Play-offs
4	Atlético de Kolkata (C)	14	4	8	2	16	14	+2	20	Advance to ISL Play-offs
5	NorthEast United	14	5	3	6	14	14	0	18	
6	Pune City	14	4	4	6	13	16	−3	16	
7	Chennaiyin	14	3	6	5	20	25	−5	15	
8	Goa	14	4	2	8	15	25	−10	14	

Source: Indian Super League
Rules for classification: 1) points; 2) head-to-head points; 3) head-to-head goal difference; 4) goal difference; 5) number of goals scored; 6) play-off match
(C) Champions

=== Results table ===
Home \ Away	ATK	CHE	DEL	GOA	KER	MUM	NEU	PUN
Atlético de Kolkata		2–2	1–0	1–1	1–1	0–1	1–1	0–0
Chennaiyin	1–1		1–3	2–0	0–0	1–1	3–3	2–0
Delhi Dynamos	2–2	4–1		5–1	2–0	3–3	1–1	1–1
Goa	1–2	5–4	0–2		1–2	0–0	2–1	1–2
Kerala Blasters	0–1	3–1	0–0	2–1		1–0	1–0	2–1
Mumbai City	1–1	2–0	0–0	0–1	5–0		1–0	0–1
NorthEast United	1–2	0–1	2–1	2–0	1–0	0–1		1–0
Pune City	2–1	1–1	4–3	0–1	1–1	0–1	0–1	

Updated to match(es) played on 4 December 2016. Source: Indian Super League
Legend: Blue = home team win; Yellow = draw; Red = away team win.

== Playoffs ==
Semi-Finals
1	Mumbai City	2	0	2
4	Atlético de Kolkata	3	0	3
2	Kerala Blasters	1	1	2 (3)
3	Delhi Dynamos	0	2	2 (0)

Final
4	Atlético de Kolkata	1 (4)
2	Kerala Blasters	1 (3)

== Season statistics ==
=== Scoring ===
==== Top scorers ====
Rank	Player	Club	Goals
1	(Brazil) Marcelinho	Delhi Dynamos	10
2	(Canada) Iain Hume	Atlético de Kolkata	7
3	(Uruguay) Emiliano Alfaro	NorthEast United	5
3	(India) C.K. Vineeth	Kerala Blasters	5
3	(Uruguay) Diego Forlán	Mumbai City	5
3	(Mexico) Aníbal Zurdo	Pune City	5
3	(Ghana) Richard Gadze	Delhi Dynamos	5
3	(Brazil) Rafael Coelho	Goa	5
3	(Nigeria) Dudu Omagbemi	Chennaiyin	5
10	(India) Kean Lewis	Delhi Dynamos	4

==== Top Indian scorers ====
Rank	Player	Club	Goals
1	C.K. Vineeth	Kerala Blasters	5
2	Kean Lewis	Delhi Dynamos	4
3	Jeje Lalpekhlua	Chennaiyin	3
4	Milan Singh	Delhi Dynamos	2
4	Mohammed Rafi	Kerala Blasters	2
4	Seityasen Singh	NorthEast United	2
4	Sahil Tavora	Goa	2
8	Jayesh Rane	Chennaiyin	1
8	Arata Izumi	Pune City	1
8	Mehrajuddin Wadoo	Chennaiyin	1
8	Jackichand Singh	Mumbai City	1
8	Eugeneson Lyngdoh	Pune City	1
8	Robin Singh	Goa	1
8	Romeo Fernandes	Goa	1
8	Malsawmzuala	Delhi Dynamos	1
8	Mandar Rao Desai	Goa	1
8	Shouvik Ghosh	NorthEast United	1
8	Fulganco Cardozo	Goa	1
8	Jerry Lalrinzuala	Chennaiyin	1
8	Lalrindika Ralte	Atlético de Kolkata	1

==== Hat-tricks ====
Player	For	Against	Result	Date	Ref
(Uruguay) Diego Forlán	Mumbai City	Kerala Blasters	5–0	19 November 2016	
(Nigeria) Dudu Omagbemi	Chennaiyin	NorthEast United	3–3	26 November 2016	
(Brazil) Marcelinho	Delhi Dynamos	Goa	5–1	27 November 2016	

=== Assists ===
Rank	Player	Club	Assists	Ref
1	(South Africa) Sameehg Doutie	Atlético de Kolkata	12	

=== Clean sheets ===
Rank	Player	Club	Clean sheets
1	(India) Amrinder Singh	Mumbai City	5
2	(India) Karanjit Singh	Chennaiyin	4
2	(India) Subrata Pal	NorthEast United	4
2	(India) Sandip Nandy	Kerala Blasters	4
5	(Spain) Toni Doblas	Delhi Dynamos	3
5	(India) Debjit Majumder	Atlético de Kolkata	3
7	(Brazil) Roberto Volpato	Mumbai City	2
7	(India) Albino Gomes	Mumbai City	2
7	(India) Laxmikant Kattimani	Goa	2
10	(India) Subhasish Roy Chowdhury	Goa	1
10	(Armenia) Apoula Edel	Pune City	1
10	(Spain) Dani Mallo	Atlético de Kolkata	1
10	(India) Arindam Bhattacharya	Pune City	1
10	(Republic of Ireland) Graham Stack	Kerala Blasters	1

== Attendance ==
=== Average home attendances ===
Team	GP	Cumulative	High	Low	Mean
Kerala Blasters	9	444,087	82,224	54,574	60,256
NorthEast United	7	187,104	32,844	18,673	26,729
Chennaiyin	7	154,976	25,163	18,213	22,139
Delhi Dynamos	7	135,499	27,463	15,111	19,357
Goa	7	123,627	19,003	14,717	17,661
Atlético de Kolkata	8	93,627	12,575	10,589	11,703
Pune City	7	60,117	9,035	7,911	8,588
Mumbai City	8	59,171	7,690	6,147	7,396
Total	60	1,260,207	54,913	6,147	21,003

=== Highest attendances ===
Regular season

Rank	Home team	Score	Away team	Attendance	Date	Stadium
1	Kerala Blasters	1-1	Atlético de Kolkata	82,224	18 December 2016	Jawaharlal Nehru Stadium
2	Kerala Blasters	0–1	Atlético de Kolkata	54,900	5 October 2016	Jawaharlal Nehru Stadium
3	Kerala Blasters	1–0	NorthEast United	53,767	4 December 2016	Jawaharlal Nehru Stadium
4	Kerala Blasters	3–1	Chennaiyin	53,152	12 November 2016	Jawaharlal Nehru Stadium
5	Kerala Blasters	2–1	Pune City	51,341	25 November 2016	Jawaharlal Nehru Stadium
6	Kerala Blasters	1–0	Mumbai City	40,013	14 October 2016	Jawaharlal Nehru Stadium
7	Kerala Blasters	2–1	Goa	34,196	8 November 2016	Jawaharlal Nehru Stadium
8	NorthEast United	0–1	Chennaiyin	32,844	20 October 2016	Indira Gandhi Athletic Stadium
9	NorthEast United	1–2	Atlético de Kolkata	30,033	28 October 2016	Indira Gandhi Athletic Stadium
10	NorthEast United	0–1	Mumbai City	29,989	5 November 2016	Indira Gandhi Athletic Stadium

== Awards ==
- Source: Indian Super League website

=== Hero of the Match ===
Match	Hero of the Match		Match	Hero of the Match	
Match	Player	Club	Match	Player	Club
Match 1	(Japan) Katsumi Yusa	NorthEast United	Match 31	(Romania) Lucian Goian	Mumbai City
Match 2	(India) Mehrajuddin Wadoo	Chennaiyin	Match 32	(Mexico) Aníbal Zurdo	Pune City
Match 3	(Argentina) Matías Defederico	Mumbai City	Match 33	(India) Mehtab Hossain	Kerala Blasters
Match 4	(Uruguay) Emiliano Alfaro	NorthEast United	Match 34	(France) Florent Malouda	Delhi Dynamos
Match 5	(Spain) Javi Lara	Atlético de Kolkata	Match 35	(India) Eugeneson Lyngdoh	Pune City
Match 6	(Brazil) Marcelinho	Delhi Dynamos	Match 36	(India) Laxmikant Kattimani	Goa
Match 7	(Hungary) Krisztián Vadócz	Mumbai City	Match 37	(India) C.K. Vineeth	Kerala Blasters
Match 8	(Brazil) Jonatan Lucca	Pune City	Match 38	(India) Milan Singh	Delhi Dynamos
Match 9	(India) Sandesh Jhingan	Kerala Blasters	Match 39	(Brazil) Raphael Augusto	Chennaiyin
Match 10	(Spain) Javi Lara	Atlético de Kolkata	Match 40	(Brazil) Rafael Coelho	Goa
Match 11	(Uruguay) Emiliano Alfaro	NorthEast United	Match 41	(Argentina) Nicolás Vélez	NorthEast United
Match 12	(Netherlands) Hans Mulder	Chennaiyin	Match 42	(Mexico) Aníbal Zurdo	Pune City
Match 13	(England) Michael Chopra	Kerala Blasters	Match 43	(Uruguay) Diego Forlán	Mumbai City
Match 14	(Uruguay) Emiliano Alfaro	NorthEast United	Match 44	(Italy) Davide Succi	Chennaiyin
Match 15	(South Africa) Sameehg Doutie	Atlético de Kolkata	Match 45	(Ivory Coast) Romaric	NorthEast United
Match 16	(France) Cédric Hengbart	Kerala Blasters	Match 46	(Hungary) Krisztián Vadócz	Mumbai City
Match 17	(Ghana) Richard Gadze	Delhi Dynamos	Match 47	(India) Mandar Rao Desai	Goa
Match 18	(France) Bernard Mendy	Chennaiyin	Match 48	(Northern Ireland) Aaron Hughes	Kerala Blasters
Match 19	(Brazil) Richarlyson	Goa	Match 49	(Nigeria) Dudu Omagbemi	Chennaiyin
Match 20	(Canada) Iain Hume	Atlético de Kolkata	Match 50	(Brazil) Marcelinho	Delhi Dynamos
Match 21	(India) Jeje Lalpekhlua	Chennaiyin	Match 51	(Scotland) Stephen Pearson	Atlético de Kolkata
Match 22	(Haiti) Kervens Belfort	Kerala Blasters	Match 52	(India) Seityasen Singh	NorthEast United
Match 23	(Romania) Lucian Goian	Mumbai City	Match 53	(Brazil) Rafael Coelho	Goa
Match 24	(Armenia) Apoula Edel	Pune City	Match 54	(India) Prabir Das	Atlético de Kolkata
Match 25	(Portugal) Hélder Postiga	Atlético de Kolkata	Match 55	(Brazil) Gerson Vieira	Mumbai City
Match 26	(France) Cédric Hengbart	Kerala Blasters	Match 56	(India) C.K. Vineeth	Kerala Blasters
Match 27	(India) Anas Edathodika	Delhi Dynamos	Match 57	(Canada) Iain Hume	Atlético de Kolkata
Match 28	(India) Jeje Lalpekhlua	Chennaiyin	Match 58	(France) Cédric Hengbart	Kerala Blasters
Match 29	(Brazil) Richarlyson	Goa	Match 59	(Spain) Javi Lara	Atlético de Kolkata
Match 30	(India) Anas Edathodika	Delhi Dynamos	Match 60	(Spain) Rubén Rocha	Delhi Dynamos
			Match 61	(Portugal) Henrique Sereno	Atlético de Kolkata

=== ISL Emerging Player of the Match ===
Match	Emerging Player of the Match		Match	Emerging Player of the Match	
Match	Player	Club	Match	Player	Club
Match 1	(India) Holicharan Narzary	NorthEast United	Match 31	(India) Jackichand Singh	Mumbai City
Match 2	(India) Jayesh Rane	Chennaiyin	Match 32	(India) Narayan Das	Pune City
Match 3	(India) Lalhmangaihsanga	Mumbai City	Match 33	(India) Pratik Chowdhary	Kerala Blasters
Match 4	(India) Robin Gurung	NorthEast United	Match 34	(India) Kean Lewis	Delhi Dynamos
Match 5	(India) Pratik Chowdhary	Kerala Blasters	Match 35	(India) Rahul Bheke	Pune City
Match 6	(India) Kean Lewis	Delhi Dynamos	Match 36	(India) Seityasen Singh	NorthEast United
Match 7	(India) Sehnaj Singh	Mumbai City	Match 37	(India) Jayesh Rane	Chennaiyin
Match 8	(India) Arata Izumi	Pune City	Match 38	(India) Lalchhawnkima	Delhi Dynamos
Match 9	(India) Mohammed Rafique	Kerala Blasters	Match 39	(India) Jerry Lalrinzuala	Chennaiyin
Match 10	(India) Boithang Haokip	Mumbai City	Match 40	(India) Romeo Fernandes	Goa
Match 11	(India) Francis Fernandes	Pune City	Match 41	(India) Seityasen Singh	NorthEast United
Match 12	(India) Jerry Lalrinzuala	Chennaiyin	Match 42	(India) Kean Lewis	Delhi Dynamos
Match 13	(India) Aiborlang Khongjee	Mumbai City	Match 43	(India) Sehnaj Singh	Mumbai City
Match 14	(India) Kean Lewis	Delhi Dynamos	Match 44	(India) Zakeer Mundampara	Chennaiyin
Match 15	(India) Abhinas Ruidas	Atlético de Kolkata	Match 45	(India) Lenny Rodrigues	Pune City
Match 16	(India) Dharmaraj Ravanan	Pune City	Match 46	(India) Sena Ralte	Mumbai City
Match 17	(India) Chinglensana Singh	Delhi Dynamos	Match 47	(India) Abhinas Ruidas	Atlético de Kolkata
Match 18	(India) Siam Hanghal	Chennaiyin	Match 48	(India) Sandesh Jhingan	Kerala Blasters
Match 19	(India) Raju Gaikwad	Goa	Match 49	(India) Siam Hanghal	Chennaiyin
Match 20	(India) Prabir Das	Atlético de Kolkata	Match 50	(India) Sahil Tavora	Goa
Match 21	(India) Narayan Das	Pune City	Match 51	(India) Abhinas Ruidas	Atlético de Kolkata
Match 22	(India) Keenan Almeida	Goa	Match 52	(India) Robin Gurung	NorthEast United
Match 23	(India) Sena Ralte	Mumbai City	Match 53	(India) Jerry Lalrinzuala	Chennaiyin
Match 24	(India) Milan Singh	Delhi Dynamos	Match 54	(India) Bidyananda Singh	Atlético de Kolkata
Match 25	(India) Lalrindika Ralte	Atlético de Kolkata	Match 55	(India) Udanta Singh	Mumbai City
Match 26	(India) Jerry Lalrinzuala	Chennaiyin	Match 56	(India) Seityasen Singh	NorthEast United
Match 27	(India) Chinglensana Singh	Delhi Dynamos	Match 57	(India) Lalrindika Ralte	Atlético de Kolkata
Match 28	(India) Lalhmangaihsanga	Mumbai City	Match 58	(India) Souvik Chakraborty	Delhi Dynamos
Match 29	(India) Rahul Bheke	Pune City	Match 59	(India) Pritam Kotal	Atlético de Kolkata
Match 30	(India) Souvik Chakraborty	Delhi Dynamos	Match 60	(India) Lalchhawnkima	Delhi Dynamos
			Match 61	(India) Lalrindika Ralte	Atlético de Kolkata

=== ISL Player of the Week award ===
Awarded weekly to the player that was chosen by fan voting on google.co.in

Week	Player	Club	Votes
1	(India) Subrata Pal	NorthEast United	28.16%
2	(England) Michael Chopra	Kerala Blasters	45.09%
3	(France) Cédric Hengbart	Kerala Blasters	82.04%
4	(Haiti) Kervens Belfort	Kerala Blasters	86.95%
5	(India) Anas Edathodika	Delhi Dynamos	59.63%
6	(India) Mehtab Hossain	Kerala Blasters	82.87%
7	(India) C.K. Vineeth	Kerala Blasters	81.40%
8	(Northern Ireland) Aaron Hughes	Kerala Blasters	89.20%
9	(Brazil) Marcelinho	Delhi Dynamos	40.86%

=== End-of-season awards ===
Award	Player	Club
Hero of the League	(France) Florent Malouda	Delhi Dynamos
Emerging Player of the League	(India) Jerry Lalrinzuala	Chennaiyin
Golden Glove	(India) Amrinder Singh	Mumbai City
Winning Pass Award	(South Africa) Sameehg Doutie	Atletico de Kolkata
Swift Golden Boot	(Brazil) Marcelinho	Delhi Dynamos
Fittest Player of the League	(Spain) Borja Fernández	Atletico de Kolkata
Fair Play Award	Chennaiyin	
Best Pitch of the Season	NorthEast United	

Indian Super League Team of the Season
Goalkeeper	(India) Subrata Paul (NorthEast United)			
Defenders	(India) Souvik Chakrabarti (Delhi Dynamos)	(Romania) Lucian Goian (Mumbai City)	(France) Cédric Hengbart (Kerala Blasters)	(India) Sena Ralte (Mumbai City)
Midfielders	(France) Florent Malouda (Delhi Dynamos)	(Spain) Javi Lara (Atlético de Kolkata)	(India) C. K. Vineeth (Kerala Blasters)	(India) Kean Lewis (Delhi Dynamos)
Forwards	(Brazil) Marcelinho (Delhi Dynamos)		(Canada) Iain Hume (Atlético de Kolkata)	
