= 2016 Indian Super League playoffs =

Tournament details
- Country: India
- Teams: 4

Final positions
- Champions: Atlético de Kolkata (2nd title)
- Runners-up: Kerala Blasters

Tournament statistics
- Matches played: 5
- Goals scored: 11 (2.2 per match)
- Top goal scorer(s): Iain Hume (2 goals)

The 2016 Indian Super League playoffs was the third playoffs series in the 2016 ISL season, the 2016 edition of the men's professional football league in India. The playoffs began on 10 December and concluded with the final on 18 December. The top four teams from the 2016 ISL regular season qualified for the playoffs with the semi-finals taking place over two-legs before the final in Kochi.

The playoffs ended with Atlético de Kolkata defeating the Kerala Blasters in a penalty shootout, 4–3, in the final. The match was a rematch of the 2014 ISL final which Atlético de Kolkata won as well 1–0.

== 2016 ISL season table ==
Pos	Team	Pld	W	D	L	GF	GA	GD	Pts	Qualification
1	Mumbai City	14	6	5	3	16	8	+8	23	Advance to ISL Play-offs
2	Kerala Blasters	14	6	4	4	12	14	−2	22	Advance to ISL Play-offs
3	Delhi Dynamos	14	5	6	3	27	17	+10	21	Advance to ISL Play-offs
4	Atlético de Kolkata (C)	14	4	8	2	16	14	+2	20	Advance to ISL Play-offs
5	NorthEast United	14	5	3	6	14	14	0	18	
6	Pune City	14	4	4	6	13	16	−3	16	
7	Chennaiyin	14	3	6	5	20	25	−5	15	
8	Goa	14	4	2	8	15	25	−10	14	

Source: Indian Super League
Rules for classification: 1) points; 2) head-to-head points; 3) head-to-head goal difference; 4) goal difference; 5) number of goals scored; 6) play-off match
(C) Champions

== Bracket ==
Semi-Finals
1	Mumbai City	2	0	2
4	Atlético de Kolkata	3	0	3
2	Kerala Blasters	1	1	2 (3)
3	Delhi Dynamos	0	2	2 (0)

Final
4	Atlético de Kolkata	1 (4)
2	Kerala Blasters	1 (3)

== Semi-finals ==
Team 1	Agg.	Team 2	1st leg	2nd leg
Mumbai City (India)	2–3	(India) Atlético de Kolkata	3–2	0–0
Kerala Blasters (India)	2–2	(India) Delhi Dynamos	1–0	1–2

=== Leg 1 ===
10 December
19:00 IST

Atlético de Kolkata	3–2	Mumbai City
Ralte 3'; Hume 39', 45+4' (pen.)	Report	Costa 10'; Vieria 19'

Rabindra Sarobar Stadium, Kolkata
Attendance: 12,500
Referee: Dilan Perera (Sri Lanka)

11 December
19:00 IST

Kerala Blasters	1–0	Delhi Dynamos
Belfort 65'	Report

Jawaharlal Nehru Stadium, Kochi
Attendance: 49,659
Referee: Pranjal Banerjee (India)

=== Leg 2 ===
13 December
19:00 IST

Mumbai City	0–0	Atlético de Kolkata
	Report

Mumbai Football Arena, Andheri
Attendance: 7,690
Referee: Arumughan Rowan (India)

ATK won 3–2 on aggregate

14 December
19:00 IST

Delhi Dynamos	2–1 (a.e.t.)	Kerala Blasters
Marcelinho 21'; Rocha 45+8'	Report	Nazon 24'
Penalties
Malouda (penalty missed); Pelissari (penalty missed); Memo (penalty missed)	0–3	(penalty scored) Josu; (penalty missed) German; (penalty scored) Belfort; (penalty scored) Rafique

Jawaharlal Nehru Stadium, Delhi
Attendance: 24,162
Referee: Dilan Perera (Sri Lanka)

On aggregate 2–2, Kerala won on penalties

== Final ==
18 December
19:00 IST

Kerala Blasters	1–1 (a.e.t.)	Atlético de Kolkata
Rafi 37'	Report	Sereno 44'
Penalties
German (penalty scored); Belfort (penalty scored); Ndoye (penalty missed); Rafique (penalty scored); Hengbart (penalty missed)	3–4	(penalty missed) Hume; (penalty scored) Doutie; (penalty scored) Fernández; (penalty scored) Lara; (penalty scored) Raja

Jawaharlal Nehru Stadium, Kochi
Attendance: 54,146
Referee: Alireza Faghani (Iran)

== Goalscorers ==
Rank	Player	Club	Goals
1	(Canada) Iain Hume	Atlético de Kolkata	2
2	(India) Lalrindika Ralte	Atlético de Kolkata	1
2	(Brazil) Léo Costa	Mumbai City	1
2	(Brazil) Gerson Vieira	Mumbai City	1
2	(Haiti) Kervens Belfort	Kerala Blasters	1
2	(Brazil) Marcelinho	Delhi Dynamos	1
2	(Spain) Rubén Rocha	Delhi Dynamos	1
2	(Haiti) Duckens Nazon	Kerala Blasters	1
2	(India) Mohammed Rafi	Kerala Blasters	1
2	(Portugal) Henrique Sereno	Atlético de Kolkata	1

== See also ==
- 2016–17 in Indian football
- 2016–17 I-League
