= Graham Stack (footballer) =

Irish footballer (born 1981)

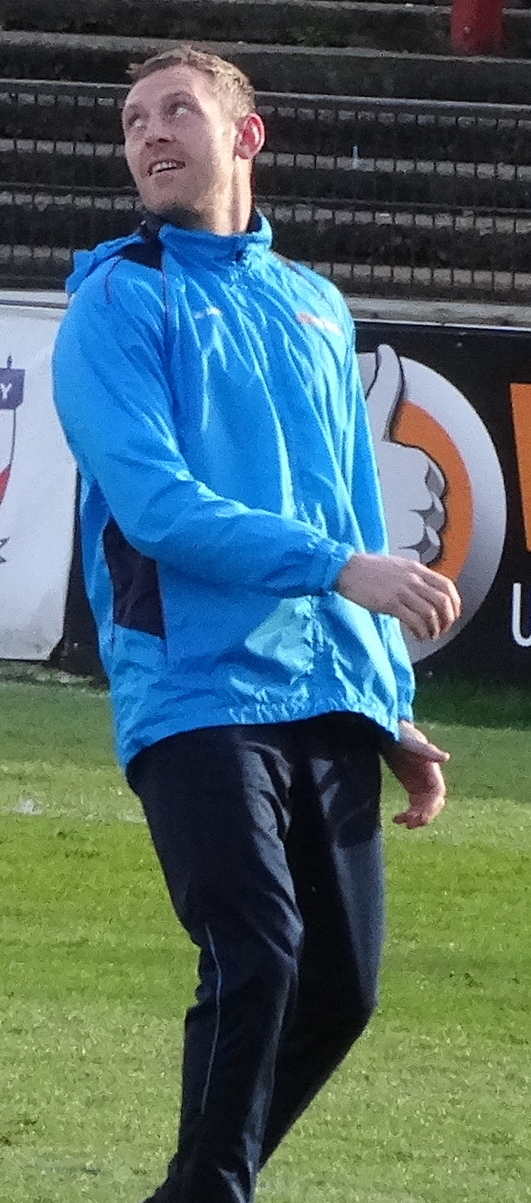
- Stack warming up for Eastleigh in 2017

Personal information
- Full name: Graham Christopher Stack
- Date of birth: 26 September 1981 (age 45)
- Place of birth: Hampstead, London, England
- Height: 6 ft 2 in (1.88 m)
- Position: Goalkeeper

Youth career
- 1998–2000: Arsenal

Senior career*
Years	Team	Apps	(Gls)
2000–2006	Arsenal	0	(0)
2002–2003	→ Beveren (loan)	24	(0)
2004–2005	→ Millwall (loan)	26	(0)
2005–2006	→ Reading (loan)	1	(0)
2006–2008	Reading	0	(0)
2006–2007	→ Leeds United (loan)	12	(0)
2007–2008	→ Wolverhampton Wanderers (loan)	2	(0)
2008–2009	Plymouth Argyle	5	(0)
2008–2009	→ Blackpool (loan)	0	(0)
2009	→ Wolverhampton Wanderers (loan)	0	(0)
2009–2012	Hibernian	56	(0)
2012–2016	Barnet	125	(0)
2016	Kerala Blasters	7	(0)
2017–2018	Eastleigh	51	(0)
2022	Chesham United	1	(0)
2024	Kings Langley	1	(0)
Total		311	(0)

International career
2003	Republic of Ireland U21	7	(0)
- * Club domestic league appearances and goals

Graham Christopher Stack (born 26 September 1981) is a football coach and former professional football player.

Stack played as a goalkeeper for Arsenal, Beveren, Millwall, Reading, Leeds United, Wolverhampton Wanderers, Plymouth Argyle, Blackpool, Hibernian, Barnet, Kerala Blasters and Eastleigh.

He also played in under-21 internationals for the Republic of Ireland.

== Club career ==
=== Arsenal ===
Stack joined Arsenal in the summer of 1998, and signed his first professional contract in July 2000. The 2002–03 season saw Stack loaned out to Belgian club Beveren, along with three other Arsenal players. In December 2002, Stack came under physical attack during a Beveren match, as hooligans charged at him. He punched one of the hooligans in the face, and riot police were quickly on the scene.

His Arsenal debut came in a League Cup match against Rotherham on 28 October 2003, a match his team won 9–8 on penalties; Stack scored in the shootout. He played in all of Arsenal's five matches in the competition, losing in the semi-finals to Middlesbrough. Stack was on the bench as Arsenal clinched the 2003–04 FA Premier League title at White Hart Lane on 25 April 2004. Stack was loaned to Millwall for the entirety of the 2004–05 season. On his return, he was loaned to Reading, at the start of the 2005–06 season.

=== Reading ===
Stack joined Reading permanently on 30 December 2005, on a two-and-a-half-year contract. During the 2005–06 season, he made four appearances in the League Cup and three in the FA Cup. On 27 October 2006, Stack signed a three-month loan deal with Championship side Leeds United, whose manager Dennis Wise had previously signed Stack for Millwall. The loan deal was extended to the end of the 2006–07 season on 29 January 2007. Stack competed for the starting position with Neil Sullivan, Tony Warner and Casper Ankergren at various points of the season, but Leeds were relegated at the end of the season.

Shortly after returning to Reading, Stack was signed on a one-month loan by Wolverhampton Wanderers, following an injury to their first-choice goalkeeper Matt Murray. His loan spell was later extended to January 2008, and then again to the end of the 2007–08 season. Stack was released by Reading, following their relegation from the Premier League, on 16 May 2008.

=== Plymouth Argyle ===
Stack signed a two-year contract with Championship club Plymouth Argyle in July 2008, after training with the club. He made his competitive debut for Argyle on 9 August 2008, with a start against former loan club Wolves. On 27 November 2008, Stack made Blackpool the sixth loan club of his career. However, a month later he returned to Plymouth without making an appearance for the Seasiders. He was loaned to Wolverhampton Wanderers for a second time towards the end of the season. Plymouth released Stack from his contract with the club with effect from 1 August 2009.

=== Hibernian ===
On 24 July 2009, Stack agreed a two-year deal with Scottish Premier League club Hibernian. He made his debut in the Scottish League Cup second round win against Brechin, and retained his place for the following league match against Celtic. Stack established himself as Hibs' first choice goalkeeper during the early part of the 2009–10 season, but then suffered recurring back problems. Stack returned to the Hibs starting line up on 20 February in a 1–0 defeat against Motherwell, but was again sidelined when he suffered an eye injury in April.

He made just one league appearance in the early part of the 2010–11 season, partly due to a recurrence of the back injury. Stack regained his place in the Hibs team in February 2011, as new manager Colin Calderwood decided to give opportunities to each of his goalkeepers under a rotation policy. Soon afterwards, however, Stack suffered a shoulder injury that required surgery. Despite that setback, Stack agreed a new one-year contract with Hibs during May 2011. Stack played regularly during the 2011–12 season, but suffered a thigh injury during the Scottish Cup semi-final that caused him to miss the last five league games and the 2012 Scottish Cup Final. Stack left Hibernian at the end of his contract in May 2012.

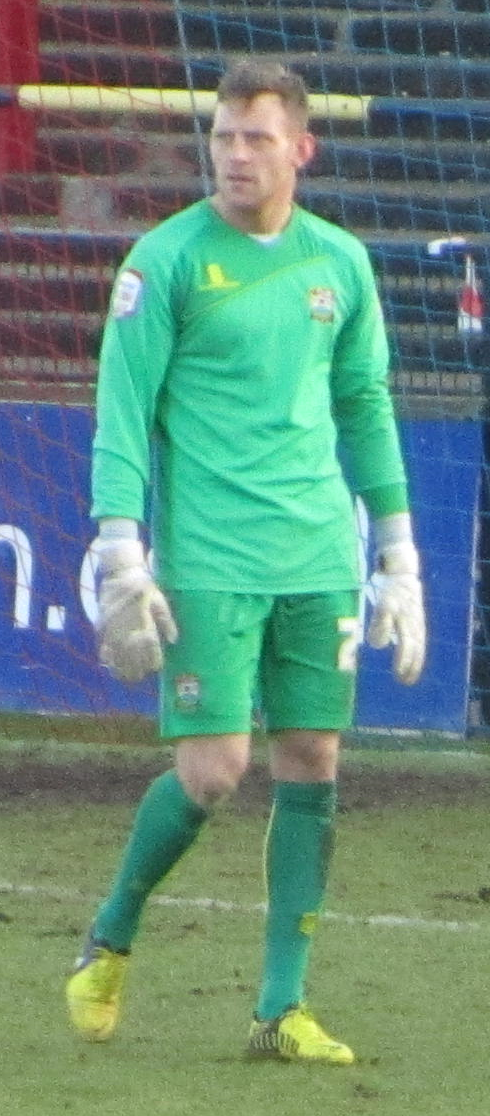
Stack playing for Barnet in 2013

=== Barnet ===
Stack had trials with Preston North End and Watford in the 2012–13 pre-season. On 23 August 2012 he signed for League Two club Barnet. He was sent off in a 2–1 defeat against Fleetwood Town on 29 September. He was eventually handed the captaincy in the absence of both Edgar Davids and Barry Fuller (who was vice-captain). After a string of excellent performances, in January 2013, he was given a three-year contract extension until June 2016. He saved a 94th minute penalty in the last ever game at Underhill Stadium, a 1–0 win against Wycombe Wanderers on 20 April 2013. Stack started the game against Northampton in the final game of the season, which they went on to lose 2–0, thus relegating Barnet to the Conference. In the 2013–14 season, Stack became team captain after Edgar Davids' resignation. Stack won promotion with the Bees by winning the Conference title of 2014–15 with the bees. He lost his place to Jamie Stephens in the 2015–16 season, and left the club in July 2016 despite being offered a new deal.

=== Kerala Blasters ===
Stack joined Kerala Blasters in a joint player and goalkeeping coach role in August 2016.

=== Eastleigh ===
After the conclusion of the 2016 ISL season, Stack returned to England to sign for National League side Eastleigh. On 7 April 2018, Stack was involved in an injury time equalising goal (which was credited to Ryan Cresswell) in a National League game against Wrexham. Stack left Eastleigh in September 2018 to take a coaching position with Watford.

=== Chesham United ===
On 26 March 2022, Stack announced via the social media platform Twitter that he has come out of retirement for a temporary stint at Chesham United in the Southern League Premier South, the 7th division of English football, to cover Chesham's main keeper because he was unavailable. He made his debut on 26 March in a league fixture at home to Poole Town. Chesham won the game 3–2 to keep their promotion chances alive. Stack played the entire game.

=== Kings Langley ===
Stack played one league game for Kings Langley in November 2024.

== Coaching career ==
Between 2018 and 2022, Stack was a goalkeeping coach at Watford, primarily coaching the club's academy keepers. In December 2019, Stack acted as caretaker assistant manager to Hayden Mullins following the sacking of Quique Sánchez Flores. Then, in July 2020, he assisted Mullins again for the final two games of the season after the sacking of Nigel Pearson.

In June 2022, Stack was appointed goalkeeping coach at Championship club Cardiff City, a role he held until February 2023 when new manager Sabri Lamouchi wanted to appoint his own coaching team.

On 6 March 2023, Stack was announced as First Team Goalkeeping Coach at Colchester United, joining as part of newly appointed Head Coach Ben Garner's Backroom Team at the League Two club.

On 9 July 2023, Stack joined Maccabi Tel Aviv as First Team Goalkeeping Coach, joining as part of newly appointed Head Coach Robbie Keane's team at the Israeli Premier League club. He left the role later that month by mutual consent.

== Career statistics ==
Appearances and goals by club, season and competition
Club	Season	League			National cup		League cup		Other		Total	
Club	Season	Division	Apps	Goals	Apps	Goals	Apps	Goals	Apps	Goals	Apps	Goals
Arsenal	2000–01	Premier League	0	0	0	0	0	0	0	0	0	0
Arsenal	2001–02	Premier League	0	0	0	0	0	0	0	0	0	0
Arsenal	2003–04	Premier League	0	0	0	0	5	0	0	0	5	0
Arsenal	Total		0	0	0	0	5	0	0	0	5	0
Beveren (loan)	2002–03	First Division	24	0			—				24	0
Millwall (loan)	2004–05	Championship	26	0	1	0	1	0	2 (Note: Appearances in the UEFA Cup)	0	30	0
Reading (loan)	2005–06	Championship	1	0	4	0	3	0	—		8	0
Reading	2006–07	Premier League	0	0	0	0	2	0	—		2	0
Leeds United (loan)	2006–07	Championship	12	0	0	0	0	0	—		12	0
Wolverhampton Wanderers (loan)	2007–08	Championship	2	0	0	0	2	0	—		4	0
Plymouth Argyle	2008–09	Championship	5	0	0	0	1	0	—		6	0
Blackpool (loan)	2008–09	Championship	0	0	0	0	0	0	—		0	0
Wolverhampton Wanderers (loan)	2008–09	Championship	0	0	0	0	0	0	—		0	0
Hibernian	2009–10	Scottish Premier League	20	0	0	0	2	0	—		22	0
Hibernian	2010–11	Scottish Premier League	6	0	0	0	0	0	1 (Note: Appearance in the Europa League)	0	7	0
Hibernian	2011–12	Scottish Premier League	30	0	3	0	0	0	—		33	0
Hibernian	Total		56	0	3	0	2	0	1	0	62	0
Barnet	2012–13	League Two	42	0	0	0	0	0	1 (Note: Appearance in the Football League Trophy)	0	43	0
Barnet	2013–14	Conference Premier	31	0	2	0	—		2 (Note: Appearance(s) in the FA Trophy)	0	35	0
Barnet	2014–15	Conference Premier	45	0	3	0	—		0	0	48	0
Barnet	2015–16	League Two	7	0	0	0	1	0	0	0	8	0
Barnet	Total		125	0	5	0	1	0	3	0	134	0
Kerala Blasters	2016	Indian Super League	7	0	0	0	0	0	1 (Note: Appearance in the 2016 Indian Super League playoffs)	0	8	0
Eastleigh	2016–17	National League	14	0	1	0	—		0	0	15	0
Eastleigh	2017–18	National League	27	0	0	0	—		1 (Note: Appearance(s) in the FA Trophy)	0	28	0
Eastleigh	2018–19	National League	10	0	0	0	—		0	0	10	0
Eastleigh	Total		51	0	1	0	—		1	0	53	0
Chesham United	2021–22	Southern League Premier Division South	1	0	—		—		—		1	0
Career total			310	0	14	0	17	0	8	0	349	0

== Honours ==
Arsenal

- FA Youth Cup: 2000

Barnet

- Conference Premier: 2014–15

Individual

- Conference Premier Team of the Year: 2014–15
- PFA Community Champion: 2015–16
