= Sandesh Jhingan =

Indian footballer (born 1993)

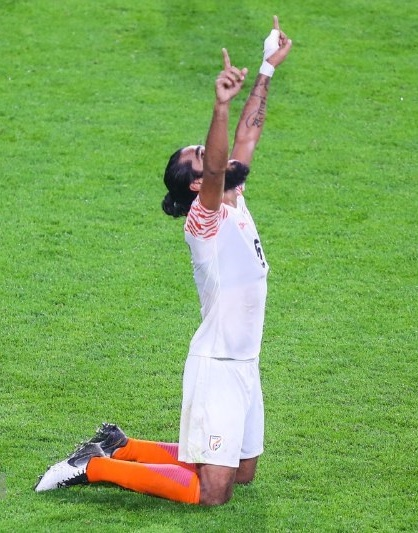
- Jhingan with India at the 2019 AFC Asian Cup

Personal information
- Full name: Sandesh Jhingan
- Date of birth: 21 July 1993 (age 33)
- Place of birth: Chandigarh, India
- Height: 1.88 m (6 ft 2 in)
- Position: Centre-back

Team information
- Current team: Goa
- Number: 3

Youth career
- –2011: St Stephen's Academy

Senior career*
Years	Team	Apps	(Gls)
2011–2013	United Sikkim	21	(2)
2013–2014	Mumbai	11	(0)
2014–2020	Kerala Blasters	76	(0)
2015	→ Sporting Goa (loan)	11	(1)
2016	→ DSK Shivajians (loan)	7	(0)
2017	→ Bengaluru (loan)	11	(1)
2020–2021	Mohun Bagan	22	(0)
2021	HNK Šibenik	0	(0)
2021–2022	Mohun Bagan	9	(0)
2022–2023	Bengaluru	22	(0)
2023–	Goa	43	(3)

International career^{‡}
2014–2023	India U23	10 (Note: Appearances as an overage player (four appearances in 2022 Asian Games))	(0)
2015–	India	76	(6)
Medal record
Men's football
Representing India
SAFF Championship
Winner	2023 India
CAFA Nations Cup
Third place	2025 Tajikistan–Uzbekistan	Team
- * Club domestic league appearances and goals as of 19:25, 13 August 2025 (UTC) ‡ National team caps and goals as of 22:00, 9 June 2026 (UTC)

Sandesh Jhingan (born 21 July 1993) is an Indian professional footballer who plays as a centre-back for Indian Super League club Goa and the India national team.

He won the AIFF emerging player of the year award in 2014 and made his debut for the India national side in 2015. In 2020, Jhingan was honoured with the Arjuna Award, the second-highest sporting honour of India. He is also the recipient of the 2020–21 AIFF Men's Player of the Year Award.

== Club career ==
=== Early career: 2011–14 ===
Born in Chandigarh, Jhingan received his football training at the St Stephen's Academy. While with the academy, Jhingan helped the side reach the South-East Asian finals of the Manchester United Premier Cup. He also represented the Chandigarh state team at the under-19 level, helping them win the B.C. Roy Trophy.

After impressive performances for his state side and academy team, Jhingan received a call-up to attend trials at I-League 2 side United Sikkim in November 2011. The trials were successful and he signed for the club the next month. Playing alongside former India internationals, Bhaichung Bhutia and Renedy Singh, Jhingan helped United Sikkim earn promotion to the I-League after the 2012 season.

In a June 2020 interview, Jhingan said that he was rejected by many second and third division clubs in Kolkata. He said, "It was during the starting phase of my career. Back then I was looking for clubs and I appeared for quite a few trials at a number of clubs in Kolkata — even in the second and third divisions. But I was rejected by all."

Jhingan made his senior professional debut in the I-League on 6 October 2012 in United Sikkim's first match of the season against Salgaocar. Jhingan started the match and lasted the whole ninety minutes and scored the winning goal for United Sikkim as they won 3–2. He then scored his second goal for the club on 18 November 2012 against Sporting Goa. His goal was the only one for United Sikkim as they lost 2–1. Despite United Sikkim suffering from relegation at the end of the season and conceding a league high 63 goals, Jhingan was noticed to be a bright talent from the team. In February 2013 it was reported that Jhingan was receiving interest from Chinese League One clubs, and that he would head to China for trials. However, selection into the India national team meant that Jhingan could not attend trials.

After the 2012–13 season, Jhingan signed a contract with Indian Super League to eventually be part of the competition which was to start in 2014. Despite struggling to sign a contract with an I-League club before the ISL began, Jhingan did reject an offer from Dempo. "Dempo is a big club and to receive an offer from them in itself was a big thing for me. There is no doubt that being associated with the club and playing under coach Arthur Papas would have benefitted me as a player. However, I don't regret my decision," Jhingan said in an interview. In November 2013 it was reported that Jhingan had signed with Rangdajied United on loan for the remainder of the season. However, not long after, it was announced that Jhingan had instead signed for Mumbai for the rest of the I-League campaign. He made his debut for the club on 7 December 2013 against Pune. Jhingan started the match and played for the whole match as Mumbai won 2–1.

A few weeks later, on 15 December, Jhingan received a red card for a second yellow offense in a match against Rangdajied United. Despite being ejected, Mumbai still drew the match 1–1.

=== Kerala Blasters: 2014–2020 ===
==== 2014: Emerging Player of the Season ====
On 22 July 2014, a day after his 21st birthday, Jhingan was selected in the second round of the 2014 ISL Inaugural Domestic Draft by the Kerala Blasters. He appeared on the bench for the side in their opening match of the season against NorthEast United. Despite not playing in the first match, Jhingan did start for the Blasters in their second match of the season against Chennaiyin. He started the match and put in a good performance but could not prevent the Kerala Blasters from losing 2–1. From that point Jhingan remained a constant presence for the Kerala Blasters throughout the 2014 season, appearing 14 times for the side. His performance for the Kerala Blasters helped earn Jhingan the "Emerging Player of the League" award.

On 20 December 2014, Jhingan started for the Kerala Blasters in the 2014 Indian Super League final against Atlético de Kolkata. Despite putting in a valiant performance, Jhingan could not prevent Atlético de Kolkata from taking the title as the Kerala Blasters fell 1–0.

==== 2015 ====
Loan to Sporting Goa

On 8 February 2015, after the 2014 ISL season, Jhingan signed with Sporting Goa on loan for the 2014–15 I-League. He made his debut for the club on the same day against Mumbai. He started and played the full match as Sporting and Mumbai drew 0–0.

2015 ISL Season

After the conclusion of the season, Jhingan was retained by the Kerala Blasters for the 2015 season and in the process became the highest paid Indian player in the league, earning more than 10 million. Despite his performances from last season, which also earned Jhingan interest from abroad, he was not able to replicate the same quality in 2015. Despite being partnered at times with former Spanish international Carlos Marchena and former Newcastle United defender Peter Ramage, Jhingan and the Blasters conceded a league worst 27 goals and finished last in the table.

==== 2016 ====
Loan to DSK Shivajians

On 4 March 2016, after the 2015 ISL season, it was announced that Jhingan would join I-League side DSK Shivajians on loan from the Kerala Blasters. He made his debut for the side two days later on 6 March against East Bengal. He started the match and played the full ninety minutes as DSK Shivajians won the match 2–0.

==== 2016 ISL season ====
Because of his solid performance at the defence and due to immense pressure from fans, Jhingan was once again retained in the draft by the Kerala Blasters for the 2016 season. In the first match of the season, Jhingan was placed at right-back as the center of defense was taken up by Aaron Hughes and Cédric Hengbart. Kerala Blasters lost the match 1–0. The next match saw Jhingan return to his preferred center back role after Hughes left for FIFA World Cup qualification. The result did not improve as the Kerala Blasters were defeated 1–0 by Atlético de Kolkata. For the rest of the season, after Hughes returned, Jhingan stayed primarily as a right-back, earning praise for his performances which helped the Blasters to reach their second Indian Super League final in three seasons.

==== Loan to Bengaluru ====
On 12 January 2017, another I-League club, Bengaluru, announced the signing of Jhingan on a season long loan deal from the Kerala Blasters. He made his debut for the club six days later in a league match against Mumbai as a 71st-minute substitute for Harmanjot Khabra as Bengaluru won 3–0. Jhingan started his first match on 11 February 2017 against Minerva Punjab in a 1–1 draw.

On 14 March 2017, Jhingan played in his first career club continental match when he started for Bengaluru in an AFC Cup match against fellow Indian side Mohun Bagan. He scored the equalizing goal for Bengaluru, his first for the club, in the 51st minute to tie the score at 1–1 before Sunil Chhetri scored the winner for the club six minutes later as the club achieved a 2–1 victory. He scored his second goal for the club, and only goal in the league, on 22 April 2017 against his former club DSK Shivajians. His 90th-minute goal was the last in a 7–0 rout by Bengaluru.

On 21 May 2017, Jhingan was part of the squad that helped Bengaluru FC win the 2016–17 Federation Cup, beating Mohun Bagan 2–0 in the final as Jhingan won his first top tier piece of silverware.

==== 2017–18 ISL: Assuming captaincy and final years at the Blasters ====
On 8 July 2017, it was announced that Jhingan has been retained by the Blasters for the 2017–18 season after he signed a long-term contract that made him the highest paid defender in the Indian Super League. Jhingan was one of three Indian players retained by the Kerala Blasters, the others being C.K. Vineeth and Prasanth Karuthadathkuni, and the deal he signed reportedly kept him at the club until 2020, paying him ₹38 million. On 16 November 2017, a day before the Kerala Blasters' first match of the season against ATK, Jhingan was announced as the captain of the Blasters for the upcoming season. He continued as the captain in the following 2018–19 season. Before the beginning of the 2019–20 season, he was ruled out for the entire season due to ACL injury.

On 21 May 2020, Kerala Blasters announced they have parted ways with Jhingan on mutual consent. When we parted ways, it was mutual and it was a mature decision from both ends. If my decision to leave Kerala was about money, I would have done that long ago when I had much-better offers. I remained loyal because I loved the project, the club and the fans. I’ve given my all to the club. I’ve played with stitches, concussions and muscle problems. Kerala Blasters will always remain a part of me. Nobody can take that away. Jhingan said about his decision of leaving the Blasters.

As a tribute to his contributions to the club, Blasters permanently retired his jersey number 21. But the Blasters later brought back the jersey in April 2022 after Jhingan was involved in a controversy by making a sexist comment after a match against the Blasters during his second tenure at ATK Mohun Bagan.

=== ATK Mohun Bagan: 2020–2021 ===
On 26 September 2020, ATK Mohun Bagan announced the signing of Jhingan on a 5-year deal. He was chosen as one of the 5 captains of the team. Jhingan's partnership with Tiri in the backlne helped ATK Mohun Bagan to keep 10 clean sheets throughout the season in 22 matches. He was featured in all matches except one where he picked up an injury after a collision with his team's goalkeeper Arindam Bhattacharya against Hyderabad. ATK Mohun Bagan finished as runners up in the playoffs and was qualified for the AFC Cup 2022. They finished second in the league table behind Mumbai City.

=== HNK Šibenik: 2021–2022 ===
Despite having a five-year deal with ATK Mohun Bagan, Jhingan's contract had clauses which allowed him to move to a European club upon receiving an offer. On 18 August 2021, Croatian First Football League side Šibenik announced the signing of Jhingan on a one-year deal with an option to extend for another year, becoming the first Indian to play in Croatia. Three days since signing the contract, Jhingan sustained a calf injury 30 hours prior to the next match day.

He returned to training in early October. After nearly two-month long injury, he made it to matchday squad in a league match against Slaven Belupo on 22 October. However he didn't get any minutes as he was benched throughout the game. He was again benched in the next match against Hrvatski Dragovoljac on 30 October.

=== Second stint at ATK Mohun Bagan: 2022 ===
During the 2022 January transfer window, Jhingan returned to ATK Mohun Bagan after parting ways with Šibenik. He signed a short-term contract with the club. Jhingan totally played in nine matches during the 2021–22 season. On 28 July 2022, ATK Mohun Bagan announced the departure of Jhingan after the expiry of his contract.

=== Bengaluru FC: 2022–2023 ===
On 14 August 2022, Bengaluru FC announced the signing of Jhingan on a one-year deal.

=== FC Goa: 2023–present ===
In June 2023, Jhingan was signed by FC Goa on a three-year deal.

== International career ==
=== Youth ===
After his triumph for his state team at the B.C. Roy Trophy, Jhingan was called up to the India under-19 side. Injuries however meant that Jhingan could not attend. Jhingan was then called up to the senior India side in February 2013 for their preparatory camp but once again an injury kept him off the team.

Prior to the 2013 SAFF Championship, Jhingan was selected to be part of the India national team. In September 2014, Jhingan was selected into the India under-23 side that would play in the 2014 Asian Games. Jhingan made his international debut at this level in India's opening match against the United Arab Emirates on 15 September 2014. He started the match and gave an own goal as India lost 5–0.

=== Senior ===
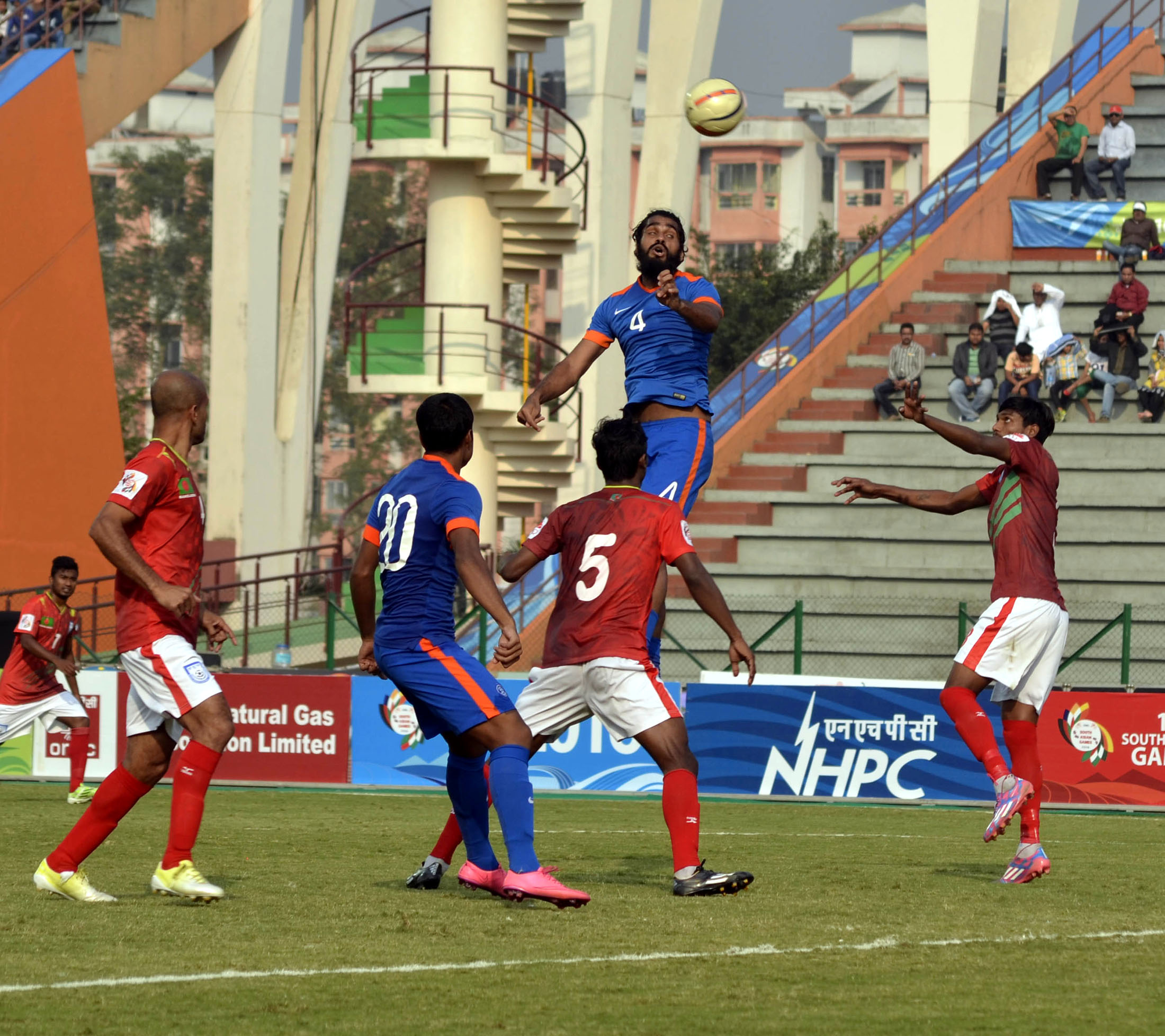
Jhingan (in blue; no 4) in action with India against Bangladesh at the 2016 South Asian Games in Guwahati.

After his performance during the 2014 ISL season, Jhingan made his senior international debut for India against Nepal in the country's 2018 FIFA World Cup qualifier. Jhingan started the match and played the full ninety minutes as India won 2–0. Jhingan then scored his first international goal for India on 29 March 2016 against Turkmenistan. His goal was the only one though for India as they fell 2–1. Jhingan then scored his second goal for India on 7 June 2016 against Laos. His 48th-minute goal was one of six as India won 6–1.

Prior to the qualifiers for the 2019 AFC Asian Cup, Jhingan scored his third international career goal when he scored in the 54th minute in an international friendly against Cambodia on 22 March 2017. His strike was the third for India as they went on to win 3–2. He then scored his fourth goal for India in another international friendly, on 6 June 2017, against Nepal. The goal was the first for India as they won 2–0. Jhingan was then handed the India national team captaincy by head coach Stephen Constantine before their friendly matches against Mauritius and St. Kitts and Nevis in the absence of regular captain Sunil Chhetri. Speaking after the match against Mauritius, in which India won 2–1, Constantine praised Jhingan, saying "Sandesh is a player who should be playing in a bigger league. He is a fighter and leads by example." A couple months later, on 11 November, India secured qualification for the Asian Cup when they defeated Macau 4–1. Jhingan started that match, thus starting in all four of India's qualification matches up till that point, and helped India keep the clean sheet against Macau, Myanmar, and Kyrgyzstan.

In 2018 Intercontinental Cup, Jhingan was a wall at the back for the Indian team. The Indian defense led by him got 3 clean sheets out of 4 matches and they won the tournament by defeating Kenya in the final.

In a friendly match against a stronger Chinese side on 13 October 2018, Jhingan was named as the captain and the match ended 0–0. It was the first time that India were undefeated on Chinese soil.

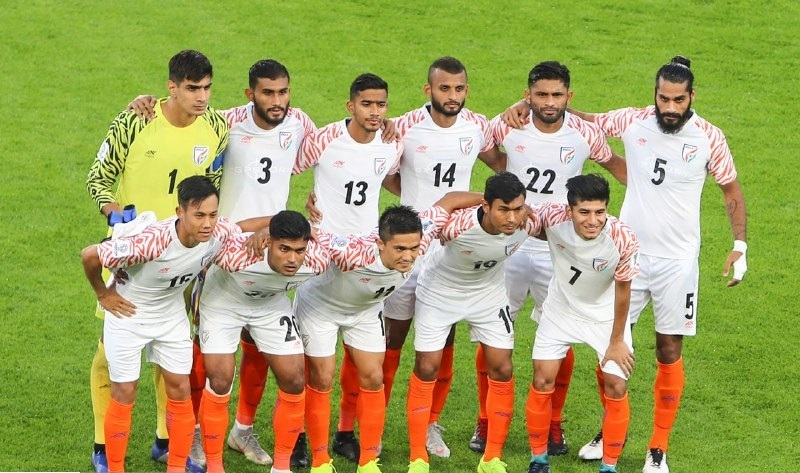
Jhingan (right end of the back row) with India national team in the match against Thailand at 2019 AFC Asian Cup.

The 2019 AFC Asian Cup was the tournament where Jhingan performed at his full potential during his first 5 years with the national side. In the first match of the tournament against Thailand, India defeated them by a score of 4–1. Jhingan's performance during the match was praised by several football pundits. Even though India was defeated by a stronger UAE by 2–0, in the next match they were at the verge of reaching the pre-quarter of the tournament. They only needed a draw against Bahrain in their last group match. India was able to hold them for 90-minute.But an injury time penalty conceded by Pronay Halder costed them the game and they were eliminated from the tournament.

9 September was the last time that Jhingan played for India in 2019. In a crucial away match against Qatar for the 2022 FIFA World Cup qualification, the match ended 0-0. He suffered an ACL injury later that month in a pre-friendly match and was reported to be sidelined for the next 6 months. He missed all the remaining 4 matches in this period due to this injury. His absence seriously affected the Indian team and they were at the bottom of the table when 5 matches were completed. They even ended up in a draw against a weaker Bangladesh side. Bangladesh assistant coach Stuart Watkiss even said that the absence of Sandesh Jhingan for their Group E Asian Qualifiers for the FIFA World Cup was slightly advantageous for them. "I mean, obviously the two defenders are very good players. Sandesh is excellent, not only defending but he's a big threat from set pieces," he told the reporters.

Jhingan made his comeback to the national team on 25 March 2021 in a friendly against Oman, where he also captained the side.

== Personal life ==
On 21 August 2020, Jhingan became the twenty seventh footballer to win the Arjuna Award. Jhingan is a supporter of the Premier League club Manchester United.

He is married to Ivanka Pavlova, a photographer from Russia.

=== Controversy ===
On 19 February 2022, Jhingan made headlines for making a 'sexist comment' after a match with ATK Mohun Bagan against his former club Kerala Blasters. In an Instagram story posted by ATK Mohun Bagan after the match concluded, Jhingan was heard saying "We have played a match with women, with women". He was met with immediate criticism by the fans, and the hashtag #BringBack21 trended on Twitter with Kerala Blasters fans urging the club management to revert the decision of retiring the number 21 jersey after Jhingan had left the club. Jhingan later formally apologised through his social media platforms. Later on 21 April 2022, the Blasters brought their number 21 jersey out of retirement and gave it to Bijoy Varghese, while announcing his three-year contract extension with the club.

== Career statistics ==
=== Club ===
As of 11 July 2025

Club	Season	League			Cup (Note: Appearance(s) in Federation Cup, Super Cup)		Continental		Other		Total	
Club	Season	Division	Apps	Goals	Apps	Goals	Apps	Goals	Apps	Goals	Apps	Goals
United Sikkim	2012–13	I-League	21	2	2	0	–		–		23	2
Mumbai	2013–14	I-League	11	0	0	0	–		–		11	0
Kerala Blasters	2014	Indian Super League	14	0	0	0	–		–		14	0
Kerala Blasters	2015	Indian Super League	10	0	0	0	–		–		10	0
Kerala Blasters	2016	Indian Super League	17	0	0	0	–		–		17	0
Kerala Blasters	2017–18	Indian Super League	17	0	1	0	–		–		18	0
Kerala Blasters	2018–19	Indian Super League	18	0	1	0	–		–		19	0
Kerala Blasters	2019–20	Indian Super League	0	0	0	0	–		–		0	0
Kerala Blasters	Total		76	0	2	0	0	0	0	0	78	0
Sporting Goa (loan)	2014–15	I-League	11	1	0	0	–		–		11	1
DSK Shivajians (loan)	2015–16	I-League	7	0	0	0	–		–		7	0
Bengaluru (loan)	2016–17	I-League	11	1	5	0	4 (Note: Appearance(s) in AFC Cup)	1	–		20	2
Mohun Bagan	2020–21	Indian Super League	22	0	0	0	–		–		22	0
Šibenik	2021–22	Croatian First Football League	0	0	0	0	–		–		0	0
Mohun Bagan	2021–22	Indian Super League	9	0	0	0	2	0	–		11	0
Bengaluru	2022–23	Indian Super League	22	0	5	0	–		5 (Note: Appearance(s) in Durand Cup)	0	32	0
Goa	2023–24	Indian Super League	10	1	0	0	–		5	0	15	1
Goa	2024–25	Indian Super League	20	1	4	0	–		–		24	1
Goa	2025–26	Indian Super League	13	1	2	0	5 (Note: Appearances in AFC Champions League Two)	0	–		20	1
Goa	Total		43	3	6	0	5	0	5	0	59	3
Career total			233	7	20	0	11	1	10	0	274	8

=== International ===
As of 9 June 2026

National team	Year	Apps	Goals
India	2015	7	0
India	2016	5	2
India	2017	9	2
India	2018	7	0
India	2019	8	0
India	2021	4	0
India	2022	7	0
India	2023	13	1
India	2024	4	0
India	2025	7	1
India	2026	5	0
Total		76	6

==== International goals ====
Scores and results list India's goal tally first

No.	Date	Venue	Cap	Opponent	Score	Result	Competition	Ref.
1	29 March 2016	Jawaharlal Nehru Stadium, Kochi, India	9	Turkmenistan	1–0	1–2	2018 FIFA World Cup qualification	
2	7 June 2016	Indira Gandhi Athletic Stadium, Guwahati, India	11	Laos	3–1	6–1	2019 AFC Asian Cup qualification	
3	22 March 2017	National Olympic Stadium, Phnom Penh,Cambodia	13	Cambodia	3–2	3–2	Friendly	
4	6 June 2017	Mumbai Football Arena, Mumbai, India	15	Nepal	1–0	2–0	Friendly	
5	28 March 2023	Khuman Lampak Main Stadium, Imphal, India	48	Kyrgyzstan	1–0	2–0	Friendly	
6	29 August 2025	Hisor Central Stadium, Hisor, Tajikistan	69	Tajikistan	2–0	2–1	2025 CAFA Nations Cup	

== Honours ==
United Sikkim

- I-League 2: 2012

Bengaluru

- Federation Cup: 2017
- Durand Cup: 2022

FC Goa

- Super Cup: 2025, 2025–26

India

- SAFF Championship: 2023
- Tri-Nation Series: 2017, 2023
- Intercontinental Cup: 2018, 2023

India U23

- South Asian Games Silver medal: 2016

Individual

- Indian Super League Emerging Player of the Season: 2014
- AIFF Emerging Player of the Year: 2014
- AIFF Player of the Year: 2020–21
- Intercontinental Cup Hero of The Tournament Award: 2023
- Indian Super League Team of the Season: 2024–25

Awards and accolades

- 2020 − Arjuna Award, by the Government of India in recognition of his outstanding achievement in sports.

== See also ==
- List of Indian football players in foreign leagues

== Notes ==
Sporting positions
Preceded by Aaron Hughes	Kerala Blasters FC; Captain; 2017–2019	Succeeded by Bartholomew Ogbeche
