= List of Indian Super League marquees =

Since its inception, the Indian Super League, one of the top footballing tournaments in India, has adopted the marquee player rule in which all eight teams signed one player to be their marquee player for the season. The rule allows ISL teams to pursue players who, in their prime, were considered superstars in the game. Their presence would help build attendances and fanfare throughout the league while also benefiting the players on the field performance wise.

Former Liverpool and Spanish international player, Luis García was the first marquee player in the Indian Super League when he signed for Atlético de Kolkata.

== History ==
Prior to the start of the Indian Super League, it was announced that all teams would include at least one marquee player in their side. Luis García was the first marquee signed when he was bought in by Atlético de Kolkata in July 2014. The first season began with the inaugural class of marquee players being García at Atlético de Kolkata, former Brazilian international Elano at Chennaiyin, former Juventus and World Cup winning Italian forward Alessandro Del Piero at Delhi Dynamos, former Arsenal and World Cup winning France midfielder Robert Pires at Goa, former England international goalkeeper David James at Kerala Blasters, former Swedish international Freddie Ljungberg at Mumbai City, another former Spanish international and World Cup winner Joan Capdevila at NorthEast United, and former French international and World Cup winner, David Trezeguet, at Pune City. For Kerala Blasters, David James not only served as the marquee player but also as the team's head coach.

After the first season, the ISL introduced a salary cap of 20 crore which also included marquee players in the cap. Due to the new salary cap and various other reasons, only Elano was retained as a marquee player for the 2015 season. Atlético de Kolkata decided to replace García with former Portuguese international Hélder Postiga. Both Delhi Dynamos and Goa continued the run of bringing in Brazilian marquee players by signing former internationals Roberto Carlos and Lúcio respectively. NorthEast United signed another former Portugal international in Simão Sabrosa while the Kerala Blasters bought in Carlos Marchena. Mumbai City and Pune City signed Nicolas Anelka and former Chelsea forward Adrian Mutu respectively. Both Carlos and Anelka would also serve as player-coaches throughout the season.

After the 2015 season it was announced that signing marquee players who also served as head coaches would be banned from happening in the Indian Super League.

== 2016 season marquee players ==
Year signed	Team	Marquee
2015	Atlético de Kolkata	(Portugal) Hélder Postiga
2016	Chennaiyin	(Norway) John Arne Riise
2016	Delhi Dynamos	(France) Florent Malouda
2015	Goa	(Brazil) Lúcio
2016	Kerala Blasters	(Northern Ireland) Aaron Hughes
2016	Mumbai City	(Uruguay) Diego Forlán
2016	NorthEast United	(Ivory Coast) Didier Zokora
2016	Pune City	(Mali) Mohamed Sissoko

== Past marquee players ==
Year signed	Player	Club
2014	(Spain) Luis García	Atlético de Kolkata
2014–2015	(Brazil) Elano	Chennaiyin
2014	(Italy) Alessandro Del Piero	Delhi Dynamos
2014	(France) Robert Pires	Goa
2014	(England) David James	Kerala Blasters
2014	(Sweden) Freddie Ljungberg	Mumbai City
2014	(Spain) Joan Capdevila	NorthEast United
2014	(France) David Trezeguet	Pune City
2015	(Brazil) Roberto Carlos	Delhi Dynamos
2015	(Spain) Carlos Marchena	Kerala Blasters
2015	(France) Nicolas Anelka	Mumbai City
2015	(Portugal) Simão Sabrosa	NorthEast United
2015	(Romania) Adrian Mutu	Pune City
2016	(Iceland) Eiður Guðjohnsen	Pune City

== Marquee players by country ==
No. of players	Country	Players
4	France	David Trezeguet, Florent Malouda, Nicolas Anelka, Robert Pires
3	Brazil	Elano, Lúcio, Roberto Carlos
3	Italy	Alessandro Del Piero, Marco Materazzi, Alessandro Nesta
3	Spain	Carlos Marchena, Joan Capdevila, Luis García
2	Portugal	Hélder Postiga, Simão Sabrosa
1	England	David James
1	(Republic of Ireland) Ireland	Robbie Keane
1	Ivory Coast	Didier Zokora
1	Mali	Mohamed Sissoko
1	Northern Ireland	Aaron Hughes
1	Norway	John Arne Riise
1	Romania	Adrian Mutu
1	Sweden	Freddie Ljungberg
1	Uruguay	Diego Forlán
1	Ghana	Asamoah Gyan
1	Bulgaria	Dimitar Berbatov

== See also ==
- List of foreign Indian Super League players
