= Henrique Sereno =

Portuguese footballer (born 1985)

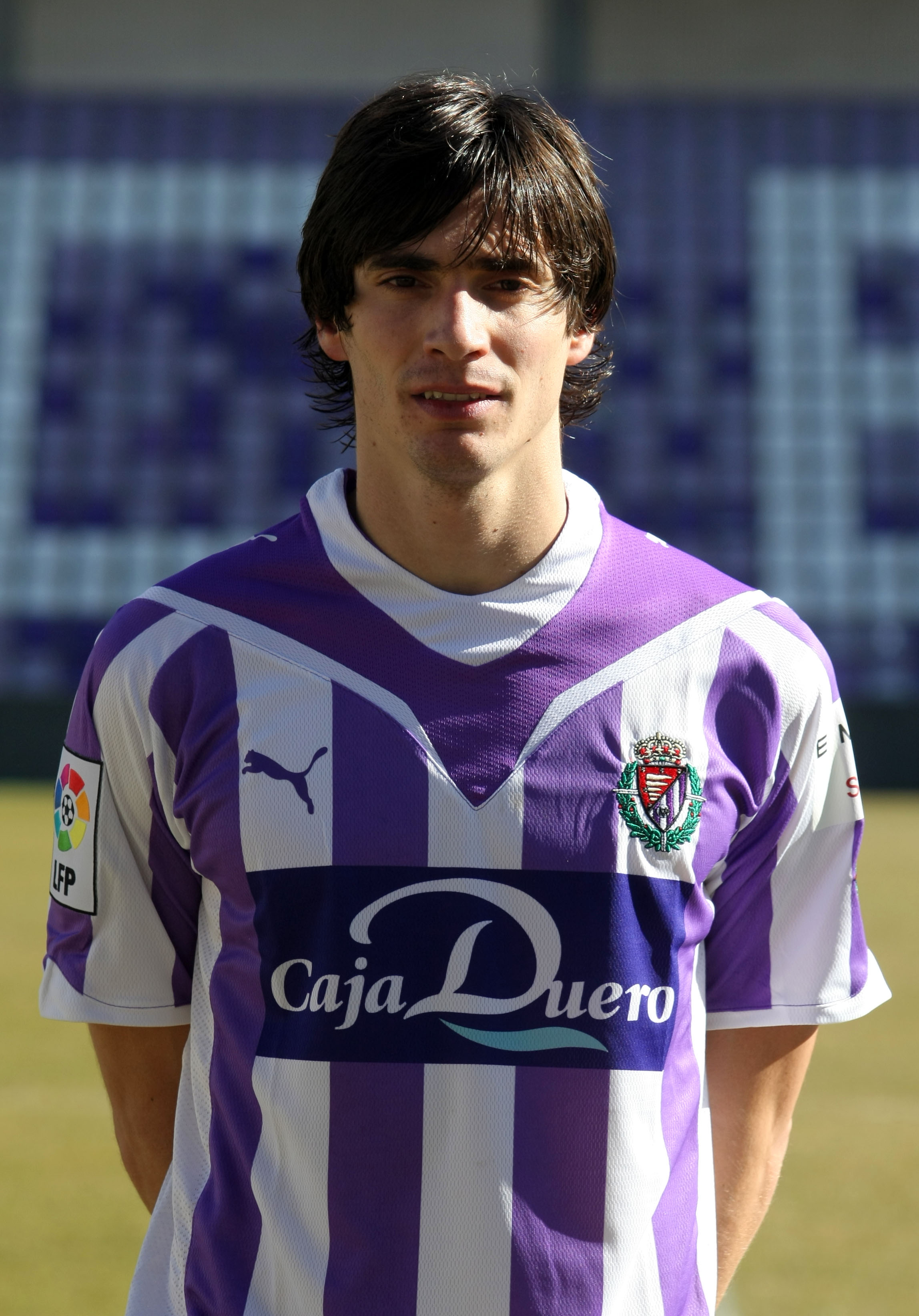
- Sereno with Valladolid in 2010

Personal information
- Full name: Henrique Sereno Fonseca
- Date of birth: 18 May 1985 (age 41)
- Place of birth: Elvas, Portugal
- Height: 1.88 m (6 ft 2 in)
- Position: Centre-back

Youth career
- 1995–2004: Os Elvenses

Senior career*
Years	Team	Apps	(Gls)
2004–2005	O Elvas	25	(1)
2005–2010	Vitória Guimarães	54	(2)
2006	→ Famalicão (loan)	23	(0)
2010	Valladolid	12	(0)
2010–2013	Porto	7	(0)
2011–2012	→ 1. FC Köln (loan)	25	(0)
2012–2013	→ Valladolid (loan)	20	(1)
2013–2015	Kayserispor	41	(4)
2015–2016	Mainz 05	0	(0)
2016	ATK	10	(1)
2017	Almería	1	(0)
2017	Chennaiyin	18	(1)
Total		236	(10)

International career
2008	Portugal U21	1	(0)
2009	Portugal B	1	(0)
2013	Portugal	2	(0)
- * Club domestic league appearances and goals

Henrique Sereno Fonseca (born 18 May 1985), known as Sereno, is a Portuguese former professional footballer who played as a central defender.

He played 49 Primeira Liga games for Vitória de Guimarães and Porto but spent most of his career abroad, representing Valladolid in La Liga and 1. FC Köln in the Bundesliga as well as spells in Turkey and India. He earned two caps for Portugal in 2013.

== Club career ==
=== Vitória Guimarães ===
Born in Elvas, Alto Alentejo, Sereno joined Vitória de Guimarães for 2005–06 from hometown's O Elvas CAD. He served a loan stint during the latter part of that season at lowly F.C. Famalicão.

In the 2007–08 campaign Sereno, alongside Brazilian Pedro Geromel, formed a solid defensive partnership as Vitória came from the Segunda Liga into a final third Primeira Liga position. He scored a rare goal on 9 March 2008, in a 2–0 home win against Sporting CP.

Sereno spent the vast majority of 2008–09 in the sidelines after having undergone surgery to both knees, only appearing in six games.

=== Valladolid ===
After beginning the following season again in the starting XI (nine matches, one goal), Sereno eventually terminated his contract and, on 1 February 2010, signed with Real Valladolid in Spain for five months. He made his debut for his new team on 20 March 2010, playing the entire 2–0 away victory over Deportivo de La Coruña.

=== Porto ===
In late June 2010, after Valladolid's relegation in La Liga, Sereno returned to his country, signing with FC Porto on a free transfer. On 20 August 2011, deemed surplus to requirements as practically all Portuguese players, he joined German club 1. FC Köln on a season-long loan.

Sereno made his Bundesliga debut on 27 August 2011, playing the full 90 minutes of a 4–3 away defeat of Hamburger SV. He featured regularly during the campaign, but his team suffered relegation.

Sereno returned to Valladolid and Spain's top flight for 2012–13, still under contract with Porto. He scored his only goal for the former on 24 February 2013, in the 2–1 away win against Rayo Vallecano.

=== Later career ===
In summer 2013, Sereno joined Kayserispor from Turkey. He made his Süper Lig debut on 15 September, featuring the full 90 minutes in a 1–1 draw at Gençlerbirliği SK. He ended the season with 22 matches and three goals, in an eventual relegation as last.

On 27 July 2015, the free agent Sereno returned to Germany by penning a two-year deal with 1. FSV Mainz 05. The following 15 June, however, after no competitive appearances, he was released.

Sereno scored his first goal for his next club, ATK, on 18 December 2016. It proved to be the equaliser as they went on to win the final of the Indian Super League on penalties, against Kerala Blasters FC.

On 31 January 2017, Sereno signed a six-month contract with Segunda División side UD Almería. On 15 September he returned to the Indian top tier, joining Chennaiyin FC for free and going on to act as captain for the eventual champions.

Two years after announcing his retirement at the age of 34, Sereno became president of U.D. Vilafranquense, with the Portuguese second-tier club overcome by severe financial problems. In April 2023 he oversaw their merger with C.D. Aves, moving to Vila das Aves and creating the new AVS Futebol SAD.

== International career ==
Sereno made his debut for Portugal on 10 June 2013, playing the second half of a 1–0 friendly win against Croatia in Geneva. His only other cap came on 15 October in a 2014 FIFA World Cup qualifier at home to Luxembourg, again from the bench in a 3–0 victory.

== Personal life ==
On 24 June 2016, the Elvas city hall commended Sereno for his sporting achievements.

== Career statistics ==
=== Club ===
Appearances and goals by club, season and competition
Club	Season	League			Cup		Other		Total	
Club	Season	Division	Apps	Goals	Apps	Goals	Apps	Goals	Apps	Goals
O Elvas	2004–05	Terceira Divisão	25	1	0	0	—		25	1
Vitória Guimarães	2006–07	Segunda Liga	12	0	0	0	—		12	0
Vitória Guimarães	2007–08	Primeira Liga	27	1	4	0	—		31	1
Vitória Guimarães	2008–09	Primeira Liga	6	0	0	0	0	0	6	0
Vitória Guimarães	2009–10	Primeira Liga	9	1	6	0	—		15	1
Vitória Guimarães	Total		54	2	10	0	0	0	64	2
Famalicão (loan)	2005–06	Segunda Divisão	23	0	0	0	—		23	0
Valladolid	2009–10	La Liga	12	0	0	0	—		12	0
Porto	2010–11	Primeira Liga	7	0	6	0	0	0	13	0
Porto	2011–12	Primeira Liga	0	0	0	0	0	0	0	0
Porto	Total		7	0	6	0	0	0	13	0
1. FC Köln (loan)	2011–12	Bundesliga	25	0	1	0	—		26	0
Valladolid (loan)	2012–13	La Liga	20	1	1	0	—		21	1
Kayserispor	2013–14	Süper Lig	22	3	0	0	—		22	3
Kayserispor	2014–15	TFF First League	19	1	1	0	—		20	1
Kayserispor	Total		41	4	1	0	—		42	4
Mainz 05	2015–16	Bundesliga	0	0	0	0	—		0	0
ATK	2016	Indian Super League	10	1	—		—		10	1
Almería	2016–17	Segunda División	1	0	0	0	—		1	0
Chennaiyin	2017–18	Indian Super League	18	1	—		—		18	1
Career total			236	10	19	0	0	0	255	10

=== International ===
Appearances and goals by national team and year
National team	Year	Apps	Goals
Portugal	2013	2	0
Total		2	0

== Honours ==
Porto

- Primeira Liga: 2010–11
- Taça de Portugal: 2010–11
- Supertaça Cândido de Oliveira: 2010, 2011

Kayserispor

- TFF First League: 2014–15

ATK

- Indian Super League: 2016

Chennaiyin

- Indian Super League: 2017–18
