= Maurizio Peluso =

Italian footballer

Personal information
- Date of birth: 20 June 1985 (age 41)
- Place of birth: Taranto, Italy
- Height: 1.72 m (5 ft 8 in)
- Positions: Winger; striker

Team information
- Current team: Foligno Calcio
- Number: 10

Senior career*
Years	Team	Apps	(Gls)
- Pisa 1909
2007	Poggibonsi		
2007–2010	Juve Stabia		
2011–2013	Gavorrano		
2011	→ Avellino 1912 (loan)	6	(1)
2011–2012	→ Casale (loan)	31	(10)
2013	Aversa Normanna	5	(1)
2013	Bastia 1924		
2013–2014	Pistoiese 1921	31	(14)
2014–2016	Altovicentino	59	(31)
2016	Chennaiyin	3	(0)
2016–2017	L'Aquila	10	(4)
2017–	Foligno Calcio	8	(2)
- Caratese
- Cannara
- Tiferno
- Tolentino
- Nuova Foiano
- * Club domestic league appearances and goals

Maurizio Peluso (born 20 June 1985) is an Italian professional footballer who plays as a forward for Foligno Calcio.

== Career ==
=== Early career ===
Born in Taranto, Italy, Peluso spent the majority of his career alternating between Lega Pro and Serie D. He played for numerous clubs throughout Italy before signing with Serie D club Altovicentino. During his two-season stint with the club Peluso scored 31 goals in 59 matches.

=== Chennaiyin ===
After spending his entire career in Italy's lower leagues, Peluso signed with Chennaiyin of the Indian Super League on 6 August 2016.
