= Josu =

Spanish footballer (born 1993)

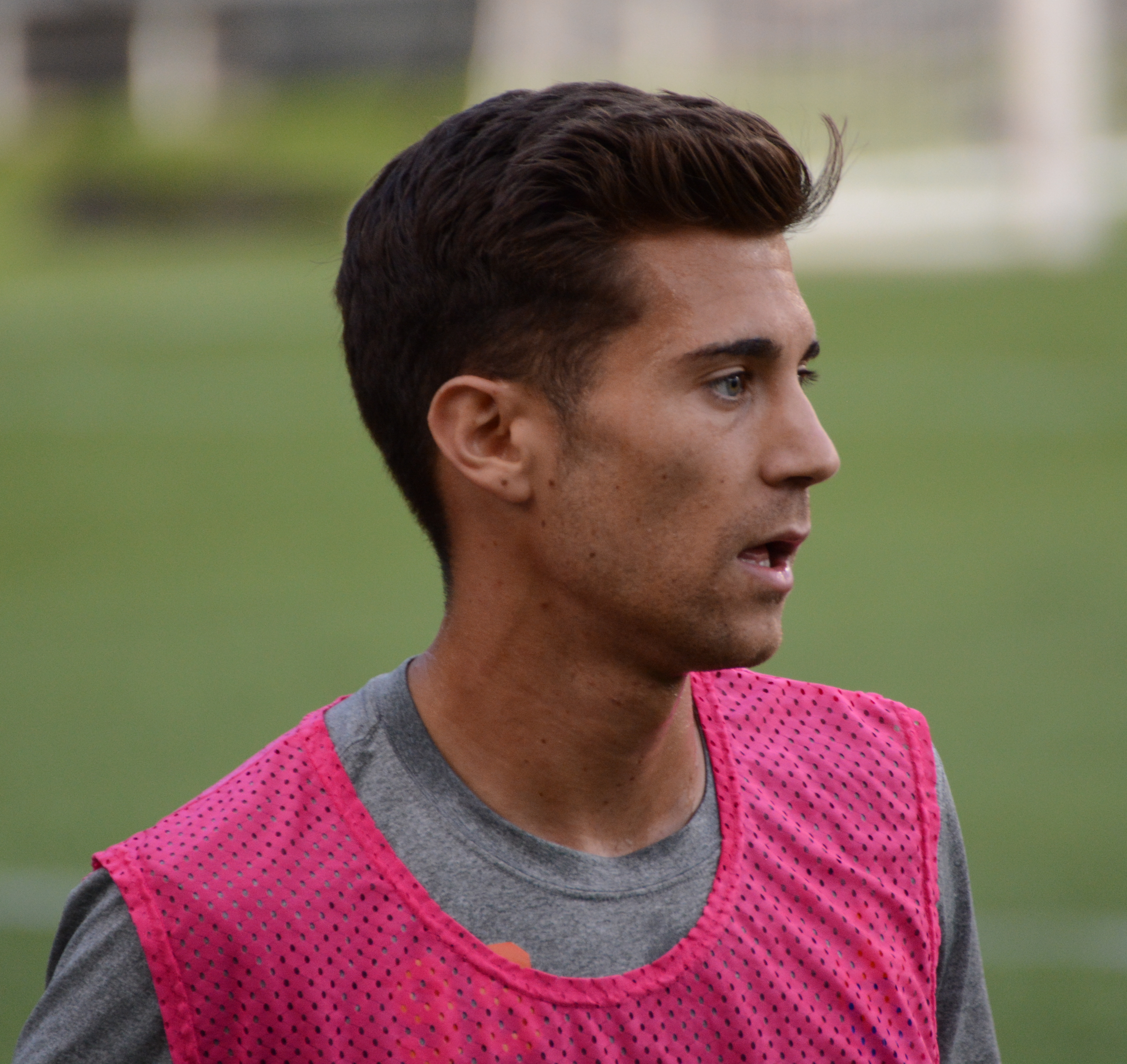
- Josu with FC Cincinnati in 2017

Personal information
- Full name: Josué Prieto Currais
- Date of birth: 27 February 1993 (age 33)
- Place of birth: Langreo, Spain
- Height: 1.76 m (5 ft 9 in)
- Positions: Left-back; midfielder

Team information
- Current team: Santjoanenc

Youth career
- CF Esplais
- FE Figueres
- Girona
- 2009–2011: Barcelona
- 2011–2012: Espanyol

Senior career*
Years	Team	Apps	(Gls)
2012–2013	Olot	4	(0)
2013	→ La Jonquera (loan)	14	(1)
2013–2014	SJK	31	(9)
2014	→ Kerho 07 (loan)	3	(3)
2014	Terracina	4	(0)
2015	Górnik Łęczna	8	(0)
2015	Kerala Blasters	11	(1)
2016	Wilmington Hammerheads	4	(0)
2016–2017	Kerala Blasters	14	(0)
2017	→ Extremadura (loan)	15	(0)
2017–2018	FC Cincinnati	15	(0)
2018	Llagostera	1	(1)
2019	Lahti	27	(7)
2020–2022	Peralada	68	(12)
2022–2023	Figueres	29	(5)
2023–2026	L'Escala	69	(11)
2026–	Santjoanenc	1	(0)
- * Club domestic league appearances and goals as of 18:24, 11 October 2026 (UTC)

Josué Prieto Currais (born 27 February 1993), commonly known as Josu, is a Spanish footballer who plays as a left-back or a left midfielder for Santjoanenc.

== Club career ==
=== Journeyman ===
Born in Langreo, Asturias, Josu emerged through FC Barcelona's youth system at La Masia, where he played alongside future Spanish international Gerard Deulofeu. He only competed in the lower leagues or amateur football in his own country, his first professional experience being with Seinäjoen Jalkapallokerho in the Finnish Ykkönen.

Josu signed with Polish club Górnik Łęczna in January 2015. Also in that year he joined Kerala Blasters FC in the Indian Super League, scoring his first goal as a professional on 6 October to help to a 3–1 home win against NorthEast United FC.

On 14 December 2016, Josu converted his penalty shootout attempt against Delhi Dynamos FC to help his team reach the final against Atlético de Kolkata (eventually lost). He subsequently returned to Spain, moving to Segunda División B side Extremadura UD.

=== FC Cincinnati ===
On 7 May 2017, Josu signed with United Soccer League club FC Cincinnati for one year; he was announced eight days later, with coach Alan Koch describing him as a varied player, writing, "He is an attack-minded left back, but can also play further up the field if needed." On 29 June, in his new team's first match against Chicago Fire Soccer Club during their semi-final run in the U.S. Open Cup, he scored in the 3–1 shootout win.

On 8 August 2017, Josu agreed to an extension that would keep him at Nippert Stadium through the 2018 season. On 16 April 2018, however, the club announced that they had reached a mutual agreement with the player to terminate his contract, indicating that he would be returning to Spain but not disclosing what his plans were or if he would continue playing professionally.

=== Lahti ===
On 8 December 2018, after a brief spell back in his homeland with UE Llagostera, Josu returned to Finland and its Veikkausliiga with FC Lahti.
