= Antonio German =

Grenadian footballer

Personal information
- Full name: Antonio Timothy German
- Date of birth: 26 December 1991 (age 34)
- Place of birth: Park Royal, England
- Height: 1.81 m (5 ft 11 1/2 in)
- Positions: Winger; forward

Team information
- Current team: Leatherhead

Youth career
- 2007–2009: Queens Park Rangers

Senior career*
Years	Team	Apps	(Gls)
2009–2011	Queens Park Rangers	22	(3)
2009	→ Aldershot Town (loan)	3	(0)
2010–2011	→ Southend United (loan)	4	(2)
2011	→ Yeovil Town (loan)	4	(0)
2011–2012	Stockport County	16	(3)
2012	Bromley	2	(0)
2012–2013	Brentford	4	(1)
2013	→ Gillingham (loan)	7	(1)
2013–2015	Gillingham	19	(1)
2014	→ Northampton Town (loan)	7	(0)
2015	→ Aldershot Town (loan)	6	(1)
2015	Kerala Blasters	9	(6)
2016	Partick Thistle	2	(0)
2016–2017	Kerala Blasters	11	(0)
2017	Ebbsfleet United	0	(0)
2017–2018	Hemel Hempstead Town	7	(1)
2018	St Albans City	8	(0)
2018	Gokulam Kerala	6	(2)
2019	Selangor	3	(1)
2020	PDRM FA	4	(1)
2022–	Leatherhead	3	(0)

International career^{‡}
2018–2021	Grenada	9	(1)
- * Club domestic league appearances and goals as of 15:52, 9 February 2022 (UTC) ‡ National team caps and goals as of 14:41, 2 January 2026 (UTC)

Antonio Timothy German (born 26 December 1991) is a footballer who plays as a winger or a forward for Leatherhead. Born in England, he has represented the Grenada national team.

== Club career ==
=== Early career ===
Born in Park Royal, London, German progressed through the Queens Park Rangers' (QPR) youth system before being promoted to the first team in May 2009.

=== Queens Park Rangers ===
German signed his first professional contract with QPR in June 2009 and was given shirt number 33. German made his debut against Plymouth Argyle in the club's final home game of the 2008–09 season, coming on as a second-half substitute. He scored his first goal in his full debut in a 2–1 victory over against Doncaster Rovers on 21 February 2010, where he bagged the first goal of the game. In the same game he had a header disallowed for offside and also a header looping just over the top of the bar. Five days after scoring his first goal, German signed a new deal with QPR until June 2012. On 20 March 2010, German scored his second goal in a 1–1 draw against Swansea City.

=== Loan spells with Aldershot Town, Southend United and Yeovil Town ===
On 5 October 2009, German joined Aldershot Town on a month's loan and made four appearances. In November 2010, German went on a month's loan to Southend United (along with teammate Jack Midson) and scored a penalty on his debut against Macclesfield Town in the FA Cup. German's loan spell was extended until 3 January, before he was recalled by Neil Warnock. On 10 February 2011, German joined Yeovil Town on loan until the end of the season, but returned to QPR after only a month.

=== Stockport County ===
Following QPR's promotion to the Premier League, German was expected to depart and was not given a squad number. On 2 September 2011, he joined Conference Premier side Stockport County after his QPR contract was cancelled. German scored his first goal against Telford United in a 1–1 draw and scored twice against Fleetwood Town in a 2–4 loss. He left the club in January 2012 when his contract ended.

=== Bromley ===
On 13 January 2012 German signed for Conference South side Bromley on a non-contract terms.

=== Brentford ===
After making two appearances for Bromley, German signed an 18-month contract at League One side Brentford after a trial. He made his debut as a half time substitute in a 2–0 away defeat to Leyton Orient. German made his first appearance of the 2012–13 season on 9 October, coming on as a substitute in a 1–0 Football League Trophy win over Crawley Town. He made his next appearance over a month later in the league against Preston North End, coming on as a substitute and scoring an 89th-minute equaliser, his only goal for the club. He made three more substitute appearances in the 2012–13 season.

==== Gillingham (loan) ====
On 26 February, German signed for League Two side Gillingham on a month's loan. He went straight into the squad for Gillingham's league match against Oxford United that night, coming on as a 79th-minute substitute in a 1–0 defeat. Two games later at home to Plymouth Argyle, he received his first start and scored his first Gillingham goal. He made four more non-goalscoring appearances before returning to Brentford after the completion of his loan.

=== Gillingham ===
On 27 June 2013, German signed for newly promoted Gillingham on a permanent basis after rejecting the offer of a new contract at Brentford. He was made available for transfer by Martin Allen on 13 September.

==== Northampton Town (loan) ====
On 1 January 2014, German signed for Northampton Town on a month-long loan. This was later extended until the end of the season.

==== Aldershot Town (loan) ====
On 27 February 2015, German signed for Aldershot Town on a one-month loan. After finding the net once in six appearances for The Shots, the club decided against extending his loan spell and the striker returned to Gillingham.

=== Kerala Blasters ===
German signed for Kerala Blasters in August 2015. During his spell at the club, he was widely praised for his performances, scoring six goals in nine games.

=== Partick Thistle ===
German signed for Scottish Premiership club Partick Thistle on 1 February 2016 until the end of the 2015–16 season. German made his debut for the club as a substitute in a 3–1 away defeat to Motherwell. On 11 April 2016 German's contract was terminated by mutual consent for personal reasons.

=== Gokulam Kerala ===
On 5 May 2018, German joined Indian club Gokulam Kerala. He left the club citing personal reasons on 6 December.

=== Selangor ===
On 1 January 2019, German joined the Malaysian club Selangor on a one-year deal for a free transfer. However, he was let go by the club in February. German later said he left the club due to racism.

=== Leatherhead ===
On 14 January 2022, German signed for Isthmian League Premier Division side Leatherhead.

== International career ==
On 13 October 2018, German made his debut for the Grenada national football team, playing the last 27 minutes in a 2–0 loss to Cuba in a CONCACAF Nations League qualifying match.

== Personal life ==
He is the older brother of former Chesterfield and current Chesham United forward Ricky German.

== Career statistics ==
As of match played 3 February 2019

Appearances and goals by club, season and competition
Club	Season	League			National Cup		League Cup		Other		Total	
Club	Season	Division	Apps	Goals	Apps	Goals	Apps	Goals	Apps	Goals	Apps	Goals
Queens Park Rangers	2008–09	Championship	3	0	0	0	0	0	—		3	0
Queens Park Rangers	2009–10	Championship	13	2	1	0	0	0	—		14	2
Queens Park Rangers	2010–11	Championship	2	0	0	0	1	0	—		3	0
Queens Park Rangers	Total		18	2	1	0	1	0	—		20	2
Aldershot Town (loan)	2009–10	League Two	3	0	—		0	0	1 (Note: Appearances in Football League Trophy)	0	4	0
Southend United (loan)	2010–11	League Two	4	0	2	1	—		1	0	7	1
Yeovil Town (loan)	2010–11	League One	4	0	—		—		—		4	0
Stockport County	2011–12	Conference Premier	16	3	0	0	—		1 (Note: Appearance in FA Trophy)	0	17	3
Brentford	2011–12	League One	2	0	—		—		—		2	0
Brentford	2012–13	League One	2	1	1	0	0	0	2	0	5	1
Brentford	Total		4	1	1	0	0	0	2	0	7	1
Gillingham (loan)	2012–13	League Two	7	1	—		—		—		7	1
Gillingham	2013–14	League One	9	0	1	0	1	0	1	0	12	0
Gillingham	2014–15	League One	10	1	1	0	2	0	3	1	16	2
Gillingham	Total		19	1	2	0	3	0	4	1	28	2
Northampton Town (loan)	2013–14	League Two	7	0	—		—		—		7	0
Aldershot Town (loan)	2014–15	Conference Premier	6	1	—		—		—		6	1
Kerala Blasters	2015	Indian Super League	9	6	—		—		—		9	6
Partick Thistle	2015–16	Scottish Premiership	2	0	—		0	0	—		2	0
Kerala Blasters	2016	Indian Super League	14	0	—		—		—		14	0
Kerala Blasters	Kerala Blasters total		23	6	—		—		—		23	6
Ebbsfleet United	2017–18	National League	0	0	1	0	—		0	0	1	0
Hemel Hempstead Town	2017–18	National League South	7	1	—		—		0	0	7	1
St Albans City	2017–18	National League South	8	0	—		—		—		8	0
Gokulam Kerala	2018–19	I-League	6	2	—		—		—		6	2
Selangor	2019	Malaysia Super League	1	1	0	0	0	0	—		1	1
Career total			135	19	7	1	4	0	9	1	155	21

=== International goals ===
Scores and results list Grenada's goal tally first.

No.	Date	Venue	Opponent	Score	Result	Competition
1.	24 March 2019	Juan Ramón Loubriel Stadium, Bayamón, Puerto Rico	Puerto Rico	1–0	2–0	2019–20 CONCACAF Nations League qualification
