= Sameehg Doutie =

South African footballer

Personal information
- Full name: Sameehg Doutie
- Date of birth: 31 May 1989 (age 37)
- Place of birth: Cape Town, South Africa
- Height: 1.70 m (5 ft 7 in)
- Position: Right winger

Team information
- Current team: Bidvest Wits
- Number: 21

Youth career
- Schotsche Kloof
- Seven Stars
- 1999–2007: Ajax Cape Town

Senior career*
Years	Team	Apps	(Gls)
2007–2011	Ajax Cape Town	40	(2)
2011–2012	Orlando Pirates	4	(3)
2012–2015	Supersport United	45	(1)
2015	→ Bidvest Wits (loan)	17	(2)
2015–2016	Atlético de Kolkata	26	(5)
2017	Ajax Cape Town	2	(1)
2017–2018	Jamshedpur FC	7	(1)
2018	IFK Värnamo	9	(2)
2019–2020	Bidvest Wits	6	(1)
2023	Manukau United	0	(0)

International career^{‡}
2009	South Africa U20	4	(0)
2010	South Africa U23	7	(1)
- * Club domestic league appearances and goals as of 8 November 2019 ‡ National team caps and goals as of 10 November 2015

Sameehg Doutie (born 31 May 1989 in Cape Town, Western Cape) is a South African footballer who plays as a midfielder for Bidvest Wits in the South African premier division.

== Career ==
=== Atlético de Kolkata ===
On 24 June 2015, it was announced that Sameehg Doutie signed an agreement with Atlético Madrid to play for their feeder club Atlético de Kolkata for the second season of the Indian Super League. The club is the ISL 2014 champions, and was managed by former Bolivia and Valencia manager Antonio López Habas. It was also announced that Atlético Madrid will look at his opportunities abroad and further his career abroad once his contract expires with Atlético de Kolkata.

In 2017, Atletico de Kolkata decided to release Doutie, after which he joined Jamshedpur FC.
