= Azrack Mahamat =

Footballer (born 1988)

Personal information
- Full name: Azrack-Yassine Mahamat
- Date of birth: 24 March 1988 (age 38)
- Place of birth: Créteil, France
- Height: 1.81 m (5 ft 11 in)
- Position: Defensive midfielder

Team information
- Current team: Ivry

Youth career
- 2006–2007: Auxerre

Senior career*
Years	Team	Apps	(Gls)
2007–2009	Auxerre B	5	(0)
2009–2012	Espanyol B	6	(0)
2009	→ Hamlstad (loan)	8	(1)
2010–2012	Espanyol	2	(0)
2011–2012	→ Melilla (loan)	7	(0)
2012–2013	Etar 1924	16	(0)
2013–2014	Lokomotiv Sofia	35	(0)
2014–2016	Platanias	36	(0)
2016	Levadiakos	11	(0)
2016	Kerala Blasters	14	(0)
2017	Trikala	10	(0)
2018–2019	Poissy	16	(0)
2019–2020	Blue Boys Muhlenbach	15	(1)
2021–2023	Lusitanos Saint-Maur	17	(1)
2023–	Ivry		

International career^{‡}
2008–	Chad	21	(0)
- * Club domestic league appearances and goals as of 18:07, 29 September 2024 (UTC) ‡ National team caps and goals as of 11:26, 1 October 2022 (UTC)

Azrack-Yassine Mahamat (born 24 March 1988) is a professional footballer who plays as a defensive midfielder for US Ivry. Born in France, he plays for the Chad national team internationally.

== Club career ==
Mahamat was born in Créteil, France. He started his career at the AJ Auxerre youth academy and, on 18 June 2009, after two years appearing solely for the reserves, he left and signed with RCD Espanyol in Spain, being immediately assigned to the B-team.

In late July 2009, following a cooperation agreement between the Catalans and Halmstads BK, Mahamat moved to the Swedish club on loan. However, he returned in December, again joining the reserve side in Segunda División B; he made his first-team debut on 1 May 2010, coming on as a substitute for Iván Alonso and playing the entire second half in a 0–2 La Liga home loss against Valencia CF. Mahamat played in the top flight of Bulgarian football between 2012 and 2014.

== International career ==
Mahamat made his debut for Chad on 6 September 2008, against Sudan. So far, he has 21 caps for the national team.

== See also ==
- List of Chad international footballers
