= Elhadji Ousseynou Ndoye =

Senegalese footballer

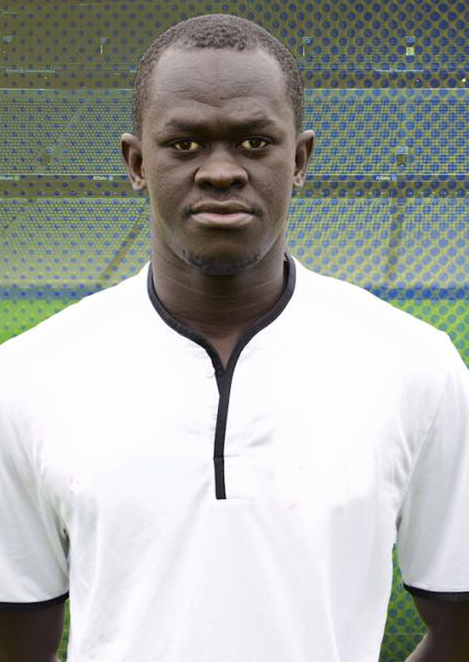

Personal information
- Full name: Elhadji Ousseynou Ndoye
- Date of birth: 10 April 1992 (age 34)
- Place of birth: Senegal
- Height: 1.91 m (6 ft 3 in)
- Position: Defender

Youth career
- Renaissance

Senior career*
Years	Team	Apps	(Gls)
2013–2015	Zulte Waregem	0	(0)
2013	RWDM Brussels (loan)	6	(0)
2013–2015	R.W.S. Bruxelles (loan)	42	(2)
2015–2016	Kyzylzhar	24	(0)
2016	Kerala Blasters	8	(0)
2017–2018	Naxxar Lions	19	(0)
2019-2021	Al-Orobah	12	(0)
2021-2023	FC Vesoul	?	(?)
- * Club domestic league appearances and goals as of 30 October 2016

Elhadji Ousseynou Ndoye (born 10 April 1992) is a Senegalese professional footballer who played as a centre back . He has previously played in Belgium and Kazakhstan with Zulte Waregem, RWDM Brussels, R.W.S. Bruxelles, and FC Kyzylzhar.

== Career ==
Ndoye began his career with Belgian side Zulte Waregem in 2013 but was loaned out to Belgian Second Division side RWDM Brussels. He made his debut for the side on 16 February 2013 against K.S.V. Roeselare. He started the match and played it in its entirety as RWDM Brussels drew the match 1–1. Ndoye was soon loaned again to the second division, this time to R.W.S. Bruxelles. He made his debut for the side on 4 August 2013 against Verbroedering Geel. He started and played the whole match as R.W.S. won 2–1.

Ndoye soon left Zulte Waregem and Belgium to move to Kazakhstani side FC Kyzylzhar. After a season in Kazakhstan, Ndoye moved to India to sign for Indian Super League side Kerala Blasters. He made his debut for the side on 5 October 2016 against Atlético de Kolkata. He started and played the whole match as Kerala Blasters lost 1–0.

Ndoye signed for Naxxar Lions in the Malta Premier League in September 2017 and collected a Man of the Match award in his first game against Valletta FC.
