= Cédric Hengbart =

French footballer and manager (born 1980)

- Hengbart in 2010

Personal information
- Date of birth: 13 July 1980 (age 46)
- Place of birth: Falaise, France
- Height: 1.83 m (6 ft 0 in)
- Positions: Right-back; centre-back

Team information
- Current team: Avranches (manager)

Youth career
- Mondeville

Senior career*
| Years | Team | Apps | (Gls) |
| 2001–2008 | Caen | 249 | (13) |
| 2008–2013 | Auxerre | 162 | (11) |
| 2013–2014 | Ajaccio | 27 | (0) |
| 2014 | Kerala Blasters | 13 | (0) |
| 2015 | Mondeville | 3 | (0) |
| 2015 | NorthEast United | 12 | (0) |
| 2016 | Kerala Blasters | 17 | (1) |
| 2017 | Mosta | 7 | (0) |
| Total | | 486 | (25) |

Managerial career
- 2019–2022: Caen B (assistant)
- 2021: Caen (assistant)
- 2022–2025: Blois
- 2025–: Avranches
- * Club domestic league appearances and goals

Cédric Hengbart (born 13 July 1980) is a French professional football manager and former player. He is the manager of Championnat National 1 club Avranches. In his playing days, he was a defender.

== Playing career ==
=== Ajaccio ===
On 31 May 2013, AC Ajaccio announced the signing of Hengbart on a two-year contract.

=== Kerala Blasters ===
On 21 August 2014, Hengbart was drafted by Indian Super League side Kerala Blasters.

Hengbart was instrumental in Kerala Blasters FC reaching the Hero ISL 2014 finals and also notched up an assist en route. Hengbart registered the second best passing accuracy (88.19%) in ISL 2014 (*Minimum 4 matches), having completed 381 passes.

=== NorthEast United ===
The following season, he signed for NorthEast United FC.

=== Kerala Blasters ===
Again in August 2016, Hengbart returned to Kerala Blasters. On 17 October 2016, he scored his first goal for Kerala Blasters, the only goal in a 1–1 draw, playing away against Pune City.

He wore the armband when marquee player Aaron Hughes went for his international duty or was injured.

== Managerial career ==
On 23 March 2021, Hengbart was promoted to assistant coach of Caen following the dismissal of Pascal Dupraz and appointment of Fabrice Vandeputte as head coach.
