= Kervens Belfort =

Haitian footballer (born 1992)

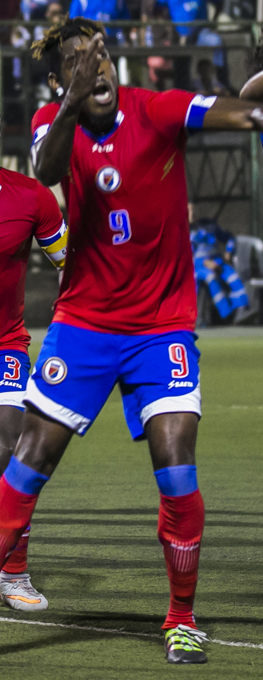
- Belfort in 2017

Personal information
- Full name: Kervens Fils Belfort
- Date of birth: 16 May 1992 (age 34)
- Place of birth: Petit-Goâve, Haiti
- Height: 1.85 m (6 ft 1 in)
- Positions: Winger; forward

Team information
- Current team: Sabah

Senior career*
Years	Team	Apps	(Gls)
2007–2009	Tempête		
2010–2013	Le Mans B	16	(3)
2011–2014	Le Mans	45	(5)
2014	Sion	0	(0)
2014	→ Grenoble (loan)	11	(3)
2014–2015	Fréjus Saint-Raphaël	7	(0)
2015	Ethnikos Achna	15	(3)
2015–2016	1461 Trabzon	11	(0)
2016–2017	Kerala Blasters	15	(3)
2017	Syrianska	8	(0)
2017	Zira	2	(0)
2017–2018	Jamshedpur	14	(0)
2018–2021	Abahani Limited Dhaka	45	(24)
2022–2023	Kelantan		
2023	Sriwijaya	7	(0)
2023–2024	Persijap Jepara	9	(3)
2024	Calicut		
2025	Lalitpur City		
2026–	Sabah	0	(0)

International career
2010–2017	Haiti	41	(14)
- * Club domestic league appearances and goals

Kervens Fils Belfort (born 16 May 1992) is a Haitian professional footballer who plays as a winger or forward for Sabah.

== Club career ==
Belfort has played for Tempête, Le Mans B, Le Mans, Sion, Grenoble, Fréjus Saint-Raphaël, Ethnikos Achna, 1461 Trabzon, Kerala Blasters, Syrianska, Zira and Jamshedpur.

Belfort was said to be popular with fans at Kerala Blasters.

After trialling with Bashundhara Kings, he signed for Abahani Limited Dhaka.

In January 2022 he signed for Kelantan.

On 31 July 2023, Belfort signed a contract with Indonesian Liga 2 club Sriwijaya.

At the end of November 2023, Belfort joined fellow Liga 2 side Persijap Jepara.

In August 2024 he signed for Indian club Calicut FC.

In March 2025 he signed for Nepalese club Lalitpur City.

In January 2026 Belfort signed for Malaysian club Sabah.

== International career ==
Belfort made his international debut for Haiti in 2010, and has appeared in FIFA World Cup qualifying matches.

== Honours ==
Calicut FC

- Super League Kerala: 2024

Individual

- Caribbean Cup Golden boot: 2014
