= 2012–13 Mohun Bagan FC season =

Indian football club season

Mohun Bagan
2012–13 season
- Chairman: Siddharth Mallya
- Head coach: Santosh Kashyap; Mridul Banerjee; Karim Bencherifa
- Stadium: Salt Lake Stadium; Kalyani Stadium
- I-League: 10th
- Calcutta Football League: Runners-up
- Federation Cup: Group stage
- IFA Shield: Semi-finalist
- Airlines Cup: Champions
- Top goalscorer: League: Odafa (19); All: Odafa (41)
Home colours	Away colours

The 2012–13 Mohun Bagan FC season was the club's 6th season in I-League and 123rd season since its establishment in 1889. The team finished runners-up in the Calcutta Football League and a dismal tenth in the I-League. They were crowned Champions in the Airlines Cup after Mohammedan refused to play the finals and gave a walkover. Mohun Bagan crashed out in the group stage of the Federation Cup and were defeated by arch rivals East Bengal in the semi-finals of the IFA Shield.

On 29 December 2012, Mohun Bagan were barred from competing in the I-League for 2 years following a decision taken by the I-League core committee. All their results in the I-League were declared null and void and all their remaining fixtures were cancelled. The suspension came because Mohun Bagan had refused to take the field in the second half of the match against East Bengal on 9 December 2012, citing crowd violence and unsuitable atmosphere for the continuation of the match.
However, on 15 January 2013, Mohun Bagan appealed against the decision to ban them from the I-League and were reinstated, but were fined a hefty amount, there officials were suspended from all AIFF meetings for one year and the team would start on 0 points and would play out only the remaining 16 fixtures in the league. This however, did not affect their win–loss and goal difference record in the table.

== Transfers ==
=== In ===
==== Pre-season ====
Pos.	Name	Signed from	Ref.
GK	(India) Arindam Bhattacharya	(India) Churchill Brothers	
GK	(India) Milton Bhowmick	(India) IFA Academy	
GK	(India) Naveen Kumar	(India) Pailan Arrows	
DF	(India) Aiborlang Khongjee	(India) Shillong Lajong	
DF	(India) Biswajit Saha	(India) Salgaocar	
DF	(Nigeria) Echezona Anyichie	(India) Southern Samity	
DF	(India) Khelemba Singh	(India) Salgaocar	
DF	(India) Lalrozama Fanai	(India) Pailan Arrows	
DF	(India) Mehrajuddin Wadoo	(India) Salgaocar	
DF	(India) Mohan Sarkar	(India) Techno Aryan	
DF	(India) Nirmal Chettri	(India) East Bengal	
DF	(India) Rajib Ghosh	(India) Pailan Arrows	
DF	(India) Warundeep Singh	(India) Churchill Brothers	
MF	(India) Arjun Chaterjee	(India) Prayag United	
MF	(India) Bijendra Rai	(India) Pailan Arrows	
MF	(India) Denson Devadas	(India) Prayag United	
MF	(India) Lalrin Fela	(India) Southern Samity	
MF	(India) Nirapada Mondal	(India) FC Green Valley	
FW	(India) Anil Kumar	(India) Dempo	
FW	(Nigeria) Stanley Okoroigwe	(India) Mohammedan	
FW	(Australia) Tolgay Özbey	(India) East Bengal	

==== Mid-season ====
Pos.	Name	Signed from	Ref.
MF	(Namibia) Quinton Jacobs	(India) Salgaocar	
MF	(India) Sushanth Mathew	(India) East Bengal	

=== Out ===
==== Pre-season ====
Pos.	Name	Sold to	Ref.
GK	(India) Sangram Mukherjee	(India) Prayag United	
DF	(India) Kingshuk Debnath	(India) Mohammedan	
DF	(India) Nallappan Mohanraj	(India) Pune	
DF	(India) Pappachen Pradeep	(India) Mumbai Tigers	
DF	(India) Surkumar Singh	(India) Mumbai Tigers	
MF	(Brazil) Hudson Lima Da Silva	(India) Bhawanipore	
MF	(India) Souvik Chakraborty	Air India	
FW	(India) Ashim Biswas	(India) Mohammedan	
FW	(Brazil) Jose Ramirez Barreto	(India) Bhawanipore	
FW	(India) Sunil Chettri	Sporting Portugal	

==== Mid-season ====
Pos.	Name	Sold to	Ref.
FW	(Nigeria) Stanley Okoroigwe	Released	

== Kits ==
Supplier: Shiv Naresh / Sponsors: McDowell's No.1

Home	Away	Goalkeeper

== Squad ==
=== First-team Squad ===
Name	Nationality	Position	Date of Birth (Age)
Goalkeepers
Arindam Bhattacharya	(India)	GK	20 May 1989 (age 37)
Milton Bhowmick	(India)	GK	—
Naveen Kumar	(India)	GK	9 January 1989 (age 37)
Shilton Pal (vice-captain)	(India)	GK	20 December 1987 (age 38)
Sudipta Banerjee	(India)	GK	20 November 1993 (age 32)
Defenders
Aiborlang Khongjee	(India)	DF	9 December 1987 (age 38)
Biswajit Saha	(India)	DF	15 December 1987 (age 38)
Deepak Sumanth	(India)	DF	17 January 1994 (age 32)
Echezona Anyichie	(Nigeria)	DF	14 May 1990 (age 36)
Khelemba Singh	(India)	DF	13 April 1985 (age 41)
Lalrozama Fanai	(India)	DF	30 November 1991 (age 34)
Mehrajuddin Wadoo	(India)	DF	12 February 1984 (age 42)
Mohan Sarkar	(India)	DF	—
Nirmal Chettri	(India)	DF	21 August 1990 (age 36)
Rajib Ghosh	(India)	DF	12 July 1989 (age 37)
Sourav Chakraborty	(India)	DF	3 July 1992 (age 34)
Warundeep Singh	(India)	DF	20 September 1986 (age 39)
Midfielders
Arjun Chatterjee	(India)	MF	—
Bijendra Rai	(India)	MF	8 June 1992 (age 34)
Denson Devadas	(India)	MF	20 December 1982 (age 43)
Jewel Raja	(India)	MF	19 January 1990 (age 36)
Lalrin Fela	(India)	MF	20 September 1990 (age 35)
Manish Bhargav	(India)	MF	22 February 1994 (age 32)
Manish Maithani	(India)	MF	1 April 1989 (age 37)
Nirapada Mondal	(India)	MF	—
Quinton Jacobs	(Namibia)	MF	21 January 1979 (age 47)
Rakesh Masih	(India)	MF	18 March 1987 (age 39)
Snehasish Chakraborty	(India)	MF	16 February 1989 (age 37)
Sushanth Mathew	(India)	MF	18 May 1978 (age 48)
Syed Rahim Nabi	(India)	MF	14 December 1985 (age 40)
Forwards
Anil Kumar	(India)	FW	19 March 1981 (age 45)
Chinadorai Sabeeth	(India)	FW	2 December 1990 (age 35)
Dipendu Biswas	(India)	FW	29 September 1981 (age 44)
Odafa Onyeka Okolie (captain)	(Nigeria)	FW	6 June 1985 (age 41)
Tolgay Ozbey	(Australia)	FW	12 April 1986 (age 40)

Last updated: 25 January 2013
Source: mohunbaganac.com

== Technical staff ==
Position	Name
Chief coach	(India) Santosh Kashyap
Chief coach	(India) Mridul Banerjee
Chief coach	(Morocco) Karim Bencherifa
Assistant coach	(Nigeria) Bernard Oparanozie
Goalkeeping coach	(India) Hemanta Dora
Fitness coach	(Malaysia) Joseph Ronald D'Angelus
Physiotherapist	(England) Jonathan Corner
Team manager	(India) Debasish Dutta

Source: mohunbaganac.com

== Statistics ==
=== Calcutta Football League stats ===
Win Draw Loss

Opposition	Score (group stage)	Score (championship stage)
Bhawanipore	2–1	1–1
Calcutta Port Trust	1–0	No Match
Eastern Rail	No Match	4–2
East Bengal	No Match	2–3
Kalighat Club	4–1	No Match
Kalighat M.S.	No Match	3–1
Mohammedan	0–1	3–0
Police A.C.	4–0	No Match
Prayag United	No Match	3–0
Southern Samity	Walkover	5–0
Techno Aryan	No Match	4–1
Tollygunge Agragami	Walkover	No Match
West Bengal Police	6–0	No Match

Last Updated: 23 May 2013
Source: Statistics

==== Goal scorers ====
Pos.	Nat.	Name	Goal(s)	Appearance(s)
FW	(Nigeria)	Odafa Onyeka Okolie	16	10
FW	(Australia)	Tolgay Özbey	6	11
FW	(India)	Chinadorai Sabeeth	5	11
FW	(India)	Anil Kumar	2	2
FW	(Nigeria)	Stanley Okoroigwe	2	4
DF	(India)	Nirmal Chettri	2	5
MF	(India)	Manish Bhargav	2	13
MF	(India)	Syed Rahim Nabi	1	3
MF	(Namibia)	Quinton Jacobs	1	7
MF	(India)	Snehasish Chakraborty	1	9
MF	(India)	Manish Maithani	1	10
DF	(India)	Aiborlang Khongjee	1	10
MF	(India)	Rakesh Masih	1	11
DF	(India)	Mehrajuddin Wadoo	1	12
TOTAL			42	16

Last updated: 23 May 2013
Source: Matches

==== Disciplinary record ====
Pos.	Nat.	Player	Booked	(yellow card) (yellow-red card)	Sent off (straight red)	Notes
MF	(Namibia)	Quinton Jacobs	0	0	1	Missed Match: vs East Bengal (23 May 2013)
DF	(India)	Sourav Chakraborty	0	1	0	Missed Match: vs Police A.C. (26 December 2012)
MF	(India)	Denson Devadas	2	0	0	
MF	(India)	Manish Bhargav	2	0	0	Missed Match: vs Bhawanipore (12 February 2013)
DF	(India)	Nirmal Chettri	2	0	0	
DF	(India)	Aiborlang Khongjee	2	0	0	
FW	(Nigeria)	Odafa Onyeka Okolie	1	0	0	
FW	(Australia)	Tolgay Özbey	1	0	0	
MF	(India)	Jewel Raja	1	0	0	
DF	(Nigeria)	Echezona Anyichie	1	0	0	
GK	(India)	Shilton Pal	1	0	0	
GK	(India)	Arindam Bhattacharya	1	0	0	

Last updated: 23 May 2013
Source: Matches

=== Airlines Cup stats ===
Win Draw Loss

Opposition	Score
George Telegraph	3–0
Mohammedan	Walkover

Last Updated: 2 November 2012
Source: Statistics

==== Goal scorers ====
Pos.	Nat.	Name	Goal(s)	Appearance(s)
FW	(Australia)	Tolgay Özbey	2	1
MF	(India)	Jewel Raja	1	1
TOTAL			3	2

Last updated: 2 November 2012
Source: Matches

==== Disciplinary record ====
Pos.	Nat.	Player	Booked	(yellow card) (yellow-red card)	Sent off (straight red)	Notes
DF	(Nigeria)	Echezona Anyichie	1	0	0	

Last updated: 2 November 2012
Source: Matches

=== Federation cup stats ===
Win Draw Loss

Opposition	Score
Churchill Brothers	0–0
Air India	0–2
Mohammedan	2–1

Last Updated: 24 September 2012
Source: Statistics

==== Goal scorers ====
Pos.	Nat.	Name	Goal(s)	Appearance(s)
FW	(India)	Chinadorai Sabeeth	1	3
MF	(India)	Manish Maithani	1	2
TOTAL			2	3

Last updated: 24 September 2012
Source: Matches

==== Disciplinary record ====
Pos.	Nat.	Player	Booked	(yellow card) (yellow-red card)	Sent off (straight red)	Notes
DF	(Nigeria)	Echezona Anyichie	2	0	0	
FW	(Australia)	Tolgay Özbey	1	0	0	
DF	(India)	Khelemba Singh	1	0	0	

Last updated: 24 September 2012
Source: Matches

=== I-League stats ===
Win Draw Loss

Opposition	Home Score	Away Score
Air India	3–2	1–0
Churchill Brothers	0–2	1–1
Dempo	2–1	0–3
East Bengal	0–0	0–3
Mumbai	3–2	1–1
ONGC	3–1	0–0
Pailan Arrows	3–2	2–0
Prayag United	1–2	1–1
Pune	1–3	2–2
Salgaocar	3–0	0–2
Shillong Lajong	2–2	0–2
Sporting Goa	3–1	5–1
United Sikkim	0–0	3–0

Last Updated: 12 May 2013
Source: Statistics

==== Goal scorers ====
Pos.	Nat.	Name	Goal(s)	Appearance(s)
FW	(Nigeria)	Odafa Onyeka Okolie	19	22
FW	(Australia)	Tolgay Özbey	10	17
MF	(India)	Denson Devadas	2	25
FW	(Nigeria)	Stanley Okoroigwe	1	11
MF	(Namibia)	Quinton Jacobs	1	13
FW	(India)	Chinadorai Sabeeth	1	16
MF	(India)	Jewel Raja	1	18
MF	(India)	Manish Maithani	1	18
MF	(India)	Syed Rahim Nabi	1	23
DF	(India)	Aiborlang Khongjee	1	24
DF	(India)	Nirmal Chettri	1	25
TOTAL			39	26

Last updated: 12 May 2013
Source: Matches

==== Disciplinary record ====
Pos.	Nat.	Player	Booked	(yellow card) (yellow-red card)	Sent off (straight red)	Notes
FW	(Nigeria)	Odafa Onyeka Okolie	0	0	1	Missed Match: vs Salgaocar (20 January 2013); Missed Match: vs United Sikkim (24 January 2013); Missed Match: vs Prayag United (27 January 2013)
DF	(Nigeria)	Echezona Anyichie	5	1	0	Missed Match: vs Sporting Goa (7 April 2013); Missed Match: vs Churchill Brothers (21 April 2013)
DF	(India)	Biswajit Saha	1	1	0	Missed Match: vs Pune (2 December 2012)
MF	(India)	Denson Devadas	7	0	0	Missed Match: vs Shillong Lajong (28 March 2013)
DF	(India)	Aiborlang Khongjee	6	0	0	Missed Match: vs Mumbai (10 April 2013)
DF	(India)	Nirmal Chettri	4	0	0	Missed Match: vs Pailan Arrows (24 March 2013)
FW	(India)	Chinadorai Sabeeth	2	0	0	
MF	(India)	Syed Rahim Nabi	2	0	0	
GK	(India)	Shilton Pal	2	0	0	
FW	(Australia)	Tolgay Özbey	1	0	0	
FW	(Nigeria)	Stanley Okoroigwe	1	0	0	
MF	(India)	Snehasish Chakraborty	1	0	0	
MF	(India)	Jewel Raja	1	0	0	
MF	(India)	Manish Maithani	1	0	0	
MF	(India)	Manish Bhargav	1	0	0	
MF	(India)	Lalrin Fela	1	0	0	
MF	(Namibia)	Quinton Jacobs	1	0	0	
DF	(India)	Mehrajuddin Wadoo	1	0	0	

Last updated: 12 May 2013
Source: Matches

=== IFA Shield stats ===
Win Draw Loss

Opposition	Score
Pune	4–0
United Sikkim	5–1
(Costa Rica) Deportivo Saprissa	0–1
East Bengal	1–1 (a.e.t.) (2–4 p)

Last Updated: 17 March 2013
Source: Statistics

==== Goal scorers ====
Pos.	Nat.	Name	Goal(s)	Appearance(s)
FW	(Nigeria)	Odafa Onyeka Okolie	6	4
FW	(India)	Chinadorai Sabeeth	3	3
MF	(India)	Denson Devadas	1	4
TOTAL			10	4

Last updated: 17 March 2013
Source: Matches

==== Disciplinary record ====
Pos.	Nat.	Player	Booked	(yellow card) (yellow-red card)	Sent off (straight red)	Notes
DF	(India)	Nirmal Chettri	2	0	0	
FW	(Nigeria)	Odafa Onyeka Okolie	1	0	0	
FW	(Australia)	Tolgay Özbey	1	0	0	
FW	(India)	Chinadorai Sabeeth	1	0	0	
MF	(India)	Denson Devadas	1	0	0	
MF	(India)	Jewel Raja	1	0	0	
MF	(India)	Manish Maithani	1	0	0	
MF	(India)	Manish Bhargav	1	0	0	
DF	(India)	Aiborlang Khongjee	1	0	0	
DF	(Nigeria)	Echezona Anyichie	1	0	0	

Last updated: 17 March 2013
Source: Matches

== Player statistics ==
=== Appearances and goals ===
No.	Pos	Nat	Player	Total		CFL		Airlines Cup		Fed Cup		I-League		IFA Shield	
No.	Pos	Nat	Player	Apps	Goals	Apps	Goals	Apps	Goals	Apps	Goals	Apps	Goals	Apps	Goals
	GK	(India)	Shilton Pal	30	0	7+0	0	1+0	0	1+0	0	19+0	0	2+0	0
	GK	(India)	Arindam Bhattacharya	18	0	7+0	0	0+0	0	2+0	0	7+0	0	2+0	0
	DF	(India)	Nirmal Chettri	35	3	5+0	2	0+0	0	3+0	0	24+1	1	2+0	0
	DF	(India)	Aiborlang Khongjee	38	2	9+1	1	0+0	0	1+0	0	24+0	1	3+0	0
	DF	(Nigeria)	Echezona Anyichie	36	0	6+1	0	1+0	0	3+0	0	20+1	0	4+0	0
	DF	(India)	Khelemba Singh	11	0	5+2	0	0+0	0	2+1	0	1+0	0	0+0	0
	DF	(India)	Biswajit Saha	37	0	6+1	0	1+0	0	1+0	0	24+0	0	2+2	0
	DF	(India)	Mehrajuddin Wadoo	24	1	11+1	1	1+0	0	0+0	0	5+2	0	4+0	0
	DF	(India)	Lalrozama Fanai	11	0	3+0	0	1+0	0	2+1	0	2+2	0	0+0	0
	DF	(India)	Rajib Ghosh	9	0	5+1	0	1+0	0	0+0	0	0+2	0	0+0	0
	DF	(India)	Warundeep Singh	2	0	1+0	0	0+1	0	0+0	0	0+0	0	0+0	0
	DF	(India)	Deepak Sumanth	1	0	1+0	0	0+0	0	0+0	0	0+0	0	0+0	0
	DF	(India)	Sourav Chakraborty	1	0	1+0	0	0+0	0	0+0	0	0+0	0	0+0	0
	MF	(India)	Syed Rahim Nabi	30	2	3+0	1	0+0	0	2+0	0	23+0	1	1+1	0
	MF	(India)	Snehasish Chakraborty	36	1	8+1	1	0+0	0	2+1	0	14+9	0	1+0	0
	MF	(India)	Sushanth Mathew	4	0	0+0	0	0+0	0	0+0	0	0+0	0	1+3	0
	MF	(India)	Denson Devadas	44	3	10+1	0	1+0	0	3+0	0	24+1	2	4+0	1
	MF	(India)	Jewel Raja	29	2	4+0	0	1+0	1	3+0	0	14+4	1	2+1	0
	MF	(India)	Rakesh Masih	22	1	6+5	1	0+0	0	2+0	0	4+5	0	0+0	0
	MF	(India)	Manish Maithani	34	3	8+2	1	0+0	0	1+1	1	13+5	1	4+0	0
	MF	(India)	Manish Bhargav	36	2	12+1	2	1+0	0	0+2	0	4+13	0	2+1	0
	MF	(India)	Lalrin Fela	9	0	1+1	0	0+1	0	0+0	0	2+4	0	0+0	0
	MF	(Namibia)	Quinton Jacobs	24	0	7+0	1	0+0	0	0+0	0	8+5	1	3+1	0
	MF	(India)	Bijendra Rai	4	0	0+3	0	0+0	0	0+0	0	0+0	0	0+1	0
	MF	(India)	Arjun Chatterjee	4	0	1+2	0	0+0	0	0+0	0	0+0	0	0+1	0
	FW	(Nigeria)	Odafa Onyeka Okolie	39	41	9+1	16	0+1	0	2+0	0	21+1	19	4+0	6
	FW	(Australia)	Tolgay Özbey	34	18	7+4	6	1+0	2	1+0	0	16+1	10	1+3	0
	FW	(India)	Chinadorai Sabeeth	39	10	8+3	5	0+0	0	2+1	1	10+6	1	3+0	3
	FW	(India)	Dipendu Biswas	8	0	1+7	0	0+0	0	0+0	0	0+0	0	0+0	0
	FW	(India)	Anil Kumar	4	2	2+0	2	0+0	0	0+2	0	0+0	0	0+0	0
	FW	(Nigeria)	Stanley Okoroigwe	16	3	4+0	2	1+0	0	0+0	0	9+2	1	0+0	0

Source: mohunbaganac.com
Last Updated: 23 May 2013
Apps: (Matches Started)+(Substitute Appearances)

=== Disciplinary record ===
Pos.	Nat.	Player	CFL			Airlines Cup			Fed Cup			I-League			IFA Shield			Total			Notes
Pos.	Nat.	Player	Booked	(yellow card) (yellow-red card)	Sent off (straight red)	Booked	(yellow card) (yellow-red card)	Sent off (straight red)	Booked	(yellow card) (yellow-red card)	Sent off (straight red)	Booked	(yellow card) (yellow-red card)	Sent off (straight red)	Booked	(yellow card) (yellow-red card)	Sent off (straight red)	Booked	(yellow card) (yellow-red card)	Sent off (straight red)	Notes
FW	(Nigeria)	Odafa Onyeka Okolie	1	0	0	0	0	0	0	0	0	0	0	1	1	0	0	2	0	1	Missed Match: vs Salgaocar (20 January 2013); Missed Match: vs United Sikkim (24 January 2013); Missed Match: vs Prayag United (27 January 2013)
MF	(Namibia)	Quinton Jacobs	0	0	1	0	0	0	0	0	0	1	0	0	0	0	0	1	0	1	Missed Match: vs East Bengal (23 May 2013)
DF	(Nigeria)	Echezona Anyichie	1	0	0	1	0	0	2	0	0	5	1	0	1	0	0	10	1	0	Missed Match: vs Sporting Goa (7 April 2013); Missed Match: vs Churchill Brothers (21 April 2013)
DF	(India)	Biswajit Saha	0	0	0	0	0	0	0	0	0	1	1	0	0	0	0	1	1	0	Missed Match: vs Pune (2 December 2012)
DF	(India)	Sourav Chakraborty	0	1	0	0	0	0	0	0	0	0	0	0	0	0	0	0	1	0	Missed Match: vs Police A.C. (26 December 2012)
MF	(India)	Denson Devadas	2	0	0	0	0	0	0	0	0	7	0	0	1	0	0	10	0	0	Missed Match: vs Shillong Lajong (28 March 2013)
DF	(India)	Aiborlang Khongjee	2	0	0	0	0	0	0	0	0	6	0	0	1	0	0	9	0	0	Missed Match: vs Mumbai (10 April 2013)
DF	(India)	Nirmal Chettri	2	0	0	0	0	0	0	0	0	4	0	0	2	0	0	8	0	0	Missed Match: vs Pailan Arrows (24 March 2013)
FW	(Australia)	Tolgay Özbey	2	0	0	0	0	0	0	0	0	1	0	0	1	0	0	4	0	0	
MF	(India)	Manish Bhargav	2	0	0	0	0	0	0	0	0	1	0	0	1	0	0	4	0	0	Missed Match: vs Bhawanipore (12 February 2013)
FW	(India)	Chinadorai Sabeeth	0	0	0	0	0	0	0	0	0	2	0	0	1	0	0	3	0	0	
MF	(India)	Jewel Raja	1	0	0	0	0	0	0	0	0	1	0	0	1	0	0	3	0	0	
GK	(India)	Shilton Pal	1	0	0	0	0	0	0	0	0	2	0	0	0	0	0	3	0	0	
MF	(India)	Syed Rahim Nabi	0	0	0	0	0	0	0	0	0	2	0	0	0	0	0	2	0	0	
MF	(India)	Manish Maithani	0	0	0	0	0	0	0	0	0	1	0	0	1	0	0	2	0	0	
FW	(Nigeria)	Stanley Okoroigwe	0	0	0	0	0	0	0	0	0	1	0	0	0	0	0	1	0	0	
MF	(India)	Snehasish Chakraborty	0	0	0	0	0	0	0	0	0	1	0	0	0	0	0	1	0	0	
MF	(India)	Lalrin Fela	0	0	0	0	0	0	0	0	0	1	0	0	0	0	0	1	0	0	
DF	(India)	Khelemba Singh	0	0	0	0	0	0	1	0	0	0	0	0	0	0	0	1	0	0	
DF	(India)	Mehrajuddin Wadoo	0	0	0	0	0	0	0	0	0	1	0	0	0	0	0	1	0	0	
GK	(India)	Arindam Bhattacharya	1	0	0	0	0	0	0	0	0	0	0	0	0	0	0	1	0	0	

Last updated: 23 May 2013
Source: Matches

== Competitions ==
=== Overall ===
Competition	Started round	Current position / round	Final position / round	First match	Last match
Calcutta Football League	–	–	2nd	18 August 2012	23 May 2013
Airlines Cup	Semi finals	–	Champions	5 September 2012	16 October 2012
Federation Cup	Group stage	–	Group stage	20 September 2012	24 September 2012
I-League	–	–	10th	6 October 2012	12 May 2013
IFA Shield	Group stage	–	Semi finals	5 March 2013	17 March 2013

Last Updated: 23 May 2013
Source: Competitions

=== Overview ===
Competition	Record							
Competition	Pld	W	D	L	GF	GA	GD	Win %
Calcutta Football League	16	11	1	4	42	11	+31	68.75
Airlines Cup	2	2	0	0	3	0	+3	100.00
Federation Cup	3	1	1	1	2	3	−1	33.33
I-League	26	11	8	7	40	34	+6	42.31
IFA Shield	4	2	0	2	10	3	+7	50.00
Total	51	27	10	14	97	51	+46	52.94

Last updated: 23 May 2013
Source: Competitions

=== Calcutta Football League ===
==== Group stage (group B) ====
2012–13 Calcutta Premier Division

==== Championship stage ====
2012–13 Calcutta Premier Division

=== Airlines Cup ===
==== Semi finals ====
Team 1	Score	Team 2
Mohun Bagan	3–0	George Telegraph
Mohammedan	3–0	Bhawanipore

==== Final ====
Team 1	Score	Team 2
Mohun Bagan	Walkover	Mohammedan

=== Federation Cup ===
==== Group stage (group B) ====
Team	Pld	W	D	L	GF	GA	GD	Pts
Churchill Brothers	3	2	1	0	9	1	+8	7
Mohun Bagan	3	1	1	1	2	3	−1	4
Mohammedan	3	1	0	2	2	5	−3	3
Air India	3	1	0	2	2	5	−3	3

=== I-League ===
Pos	Team	Pld	W	D	L	GF	GA	GD	Pts	Qualification or relegation
8	Mumbai	26	8	8	10	36	42	−6	32	
9	ONGC (R)	26	7	10	9	30	40	−10	31	Excluded (Note: ONGC and Air India were expelled from I-League because they failed to meet Asian Football Confederation's licensing criteria.)
10	Mohun Bagan	26	11	8	7	40	34	+6	29 (Note: On 29 December 2012, Mohun Bagan failed to turn up in the second half of the match against East Bengal due to crowd trouble; their record was expunged, with their remaining fixtures scratched, and they were banned from the I-League for until 2015 by the I-League core committee. On 15 January 2013, Mohun Bagan appealed the decision to ban them from the league and were reinstated, but would start on 0 points.)	
11	Shillong Lajong	26	6	10	10	26	40	−14	28	
12	Pailan Arrows	26	6	5	15	25	45	−20	23	

Source: IndiaFooty.com
Rules for classification: 1) points; 2) goal difference; 3) number of goals scored.
(R) Relegated

=== IFA Shield ===
==== Group stage (group B) ====
Team	Pld	W	D	L	GF	GA	GD	Pts
Deportivo Saprissa	3	2	1	0	4	1	+3	7
Mohun Bagan	3	2	0	1	8	2	+6	6
Pune	3	1	1	1	6	4	+2	4
United Sikkim	3	0	0	3	3	14	−11	0

==== Semi finals ====
Team 1	Score	Team 2
Deportivo Saprissa (Costa Rica)	1–2 (a.e.t.)	Prayag United
East Bengal	1–1 (a.e.t.) (4–2 p)	Mohun Bagan

=== Results summary ===
Overall								Home						Away					
Pld	W	D	L	GF	GA	GD	Pts	W	D	L	GF	GA	GD	W	D	L	GF	GA	GD
51	27	10	14	97	51	+46	91	23	4	9	80	34	+46	4	6	5	17	17	0

== Matches ==
=== Calcutta Football League (group stage) ===
18 August 2012 1	Mohun Bagan	w/o	Southern Samity	Kolkata
14:45 IST		Report		Stadium: Salt Lake Stadium

26 August 2012 2	Mohun Bagan	w/o	Tollygunge Agragami	Kolkata
14:45 IST		Report		Stadium: Salt Lake Stadium

15 September 2012 3	Mohun Bagan	6–0	West Bengal Police	Kolkata
14:45 IST	Nirmal 6'; Odafa 7', 75'; Sabeeth 52', 66'; Tolgay 78'	Report		Stadium: Salt Lake Stadium

1 November 2012 4	Mohun Bagan	4–1	Kalighat Club	Kolkata
14:00 IST	Maithani 2'; Anil Kumar 9'; Bhargav 68'; Snehasish 76'	Report	Shin Ho Sung 31'	Stadium: Salt Lake Stadium

20 November 2012 5	Mohun Bagan	1–0	Calcutta Port Trust	Kolkata
14:00 IST	Nabi 24'	Report		Stadium: Salt Lake Stadium

20 November 2012 6	Mohun Bagan	2–1	Bhawanipore	Kolkata
14:00 IST	Odafa 3' (pen.); Stanley 53'; Denson (yellow card) 19'	Report	Sanju Kumar 43'	Stadium: Salt Lake Stadium

20 December 2012 7	Mohun Bagan	0–1	Mohammedan	Kolkata
14:00 IST	Arindam (yellow card) 26'; Dipendu (yellow card) 31'; S.Chakraborty (yellow card) 40' (yellow-red card) 80'; Jewel (yellow card) 65'	Report	Wi Hyojun 40'	Stadium: Salt Lake Stadium

26 December 2012 8	Mohun Bagan	4–0	Police A.C.	Kalyani
14:00 IST	Nirmal 9'; Masih 30'; Stanley 45'; Tolgay 83'; Bhargav (yellow card) 76'	Report		Stadium: Kalyani Stadium

=== Calcutta Football League (championship stage) ===
4 February 2013 1	Mohun Bagan	4–1	Techno Aryan	Kolkata
14:00 IST	Odafa 35'; Bhargav 45', (yellow card) 29'; Tolgay 66'; Mehraj 90+4'	Report	Maidul 90'	Stadium: Salt Lake Stadium

12 February 2013 2	Mohun Bagan	1–1	Bhawanipore	Kolkata
14:00 IST	Anil Kumar 35'; Eche (yellow card) 43'; Aibor (yellow card) 67'	Report	Barreto 79' (pen.)	Stadium: Salt Lake Stadium

18 February 2013 3	Mohun Bagan	5–0	Southern Samity	Kolkata
14:00 IST	Odafa 11', 13', 74'; Tolgay 29', 86', (yellow card) 51'; Rajib (yellow card) 4'; Aibor (yellow card) 82'	Report		Stadium: Salt Lake Stadium

22 February 2013 4	Mohun Bagan	3–1	Kalighat MS	Kalyani
14:015 IST	Odafa 45', 68', 81'	Report	Tanmay 30'	Stadium: Kalyani Stadium

27 February 2013 5	Mohun Bagan	4–2	Eastern Rail	Kalyani
14:15 IST	Sabeeth 3'; Odafa 57', 76' (pen.); Quinton 88'	Report	Gautam 45'; Bapan 67'	Stadium: Kalyani Stadium

2 March 2013 6	Mohun Bagan	3–0	Mohammedan	Kalyani
14:30 IST	Sabeeth 37', 44'; Aibor 58'	Report		Stadium: Kalyani Stadium

19 May 2013 7	Mohun Bagan	3–0	Prayag United	Kalyani
15:00 IST	Odafa 38', 79', 84' (pen.); Shilton (yellow card) 36'; Nirmal (yellow card) 81'; Quinton (red card) 90+1'	Report		Stadium: Kalyani Stadium

23 May 2013 8	Mohun Bagan	2–3	East Bengal	Kolkata
17:00 IST	Odafa 39', (yellow card) 75'; Tolgay 90+3'; Aibor (yellow card) 37'; Nirmal (yellow card) 49'; Denson (yellow card) 62'	Report	Chidi 23', 73'; Penn 29'	Stadium: Salt Lake Stadium

=== Airlines Cup ===
5 September 2012 Semi finals	Mohun Bagan	3–0	George Telegraph	Kolkata
15:00 IST	Jewel 62'; Tolgay 72', 77'; Eche (yellow card) 75'	Report		Stadium: Salt Lake Stadium

16 October 2012 Final	Mohun Bagan	w/o	Mohammedan	Kolkata
17:00 IST		Report		Stadium: Salt Lake Stadium

=== Federation Cup ===
20 September 2012 Group stage	Churchill Brothers	0–0	Mohun Bagan	Siliguri
19:00 IST		Report	Eche (yellow card) 22'; Tolgay (yellow card) 54'; Khelemba (yellow card) 70'	Stadium: Kanchenjunga Stadium

22 September 2012 Group stage	Mohun Bagan	0–2	Air India	Siliguri
19:00 IST		Report	Junior 28'; Henry 86'	Stadium: Kanchenjunga Stadium

24 September 2012 Group stage	Mohun Bagan	2–1	Mohammedan	Siliguri
19:00 IST	Sabeeth 49'; Maithani 53'; Eche (yellow card) 57'	Report	Sunday 62'	Stadium: Kanchenjunga Stadium

=== I-League ===
6 October 2012 1	Shillong Lajong	2–0	Mohun Bagan	Shillong
14:45 IST	B.Haokip 59'; Lalram 90+1'; Lyngdoh (yellow card) 23'	Report		Stadium: Jawaharlal Nehru Stadium; Referee: A.Meetei

12 October 2012 2	Mohun Bagan	1–2	Prayag United	Kolkata
14:30 IST	Odafa 19'	Report	Sukhen 27'; Vincent 45', (yellow card) 4'; Gouramangi (yellow card) 9'	Stadium: Salt Lake Stadium; Referee: K.Singh

28 October 2012 3	Air India	0–1	Mohun Bagan	Pune
15:00 IST	Bheke (yellow card) 84'	Report	M.Fernandes 67' (o.g.); Biswajit (yellow card) 38'; Eche (yellow card) 61'; Denson (yellow card) 64'	Stadium: Balewadi Sports Complex; Referee: M.V.Santosh Kumar

4 November 2012 4	Mohun Bagan	3–1	Sporting Goa	Kolkata
14:00 IST	Odafa 15', 42', 55'; Eche (yellow card) 70'	Report	J.Pereira 90+1'; Dawson (yellow card) 20'	Stadium: Salt Lake Stadium; Referee: R.Shah

9 November 2012 5	ONGC	0–0	Mohun Bagan	Delhi
14:00 IST	Odeola (yellow card) 75'; Patil (yellow card) 90+2'	Report	Nirmal (yellow card) 15'; Shilton (yellow card) 90'	Stadium: Ambedkar Stadium; Referee: A.Arjunan

17 November 2012 6	Mohun Bagan	3–0	Salgaocar	Kolkata
14:00 IST	Denson 5'; Odafa 19'; Stanley 61'	Report		Stadium: Salt Lake Stadium; Referee: P.Singh

25 November 2012 7	Mumbai	1–1	Mohun Bagan	Pune
19:00 IST	Yadav 62'; Fakhruddin (yellow card) 20'	Report	Odafa 21'; Denson (yellow card) 33'; Aibor (yellow card) 50'	Stadium: Balewadi Sports Complex; Referee: T.Nagvenkar

28 November 2012 8	Dempo	3–0	Mohun Bagan	Margao
19:00 IST	Abranches 40'; Sueoka 45' (pen.); G.Franco 70', (yellow card) 45+2'	Report	Biswajit (yellow card) 29' (yellow-red card) 53'; Nirmal (yellow card) 44'; Aibor (yellow card) 90'	Stadium: Jawaharlal Nehru Stadium; Referee: B.Balasubramaniam

2 December 2012 9	Pune	2–2	Mohun Bagan	Pune
19:00 IST	Chika Wali 30'; Arata 75'; Ramu (yellow card) 90+4'	Report	Odafa 77', 84'	Stadium: Balewadi Sports Complex; Referee: M.V.Santosh Kumar

9 December 2012 10	East Bengal	3–0	Mohun Bagan	Kolkata
14:00 IST	Khabra 43'	Report	Mehraj (yellow card) 24'; Nabi (yellow card) 36'; Stanley (yellow card) 43'; Odafa (red card) 45+2'	Stadium: Salt Lake Stadium; Referee: V.Chauhan

20 January 2013 17	Salgaocar	2–0	Mohun Bagan	Mapusa
15:45 IST	Obatola 35'; Josimar 62'; F.Cardozo (yellow card) 3'; F.Fernandes (yellow card) 26'; R.Kumar (yellow card) 67'; Lamare (yellow card) 72'	Report	Tolgay (yellow card) 28'; Nabi (yellow card) 67'	Stadium: Duler Stadium; Referee: A.Shekar

24 January 2013 12	Mohun Bagan	0–0	United Sikkim	Kolkata
14:00 IST	Aibor (yellow card) 46'	Report		Stadium: Salt Lake Stadium; Referee: M.V.Santosh Kumar

27 January 2013 18	Prayag United	1–1	Mohun Bagan	Kolkata
14:00 IST	Ranti 89'; Gouramangi (yellow card) 59'; S.Oraon (yellow card) 85'	Report	Tolgay 49'; Denson (yellow card) 45'; Sabeeth (yellow card) 90+1'	Stadium: Salt Lake Stadium; Referee: K.Singh

1 February 2013 19	Mohun Bagan	3–1	ONGC	Kalyani
14:00 IST	Tolgay 10'; Jewel 63'; Odafa 72'; Nirmal (yellow card) 28'	Report	Surabuddin 84'; Minz (yellow card) 54'; Lalmuanpuia (yellow card) 57'	Stadium: Kalyani Stadium; Referee: D.Naik

9 February 2013 20	Mohun Bagan	0–0	East Bengal	Kolkata
14:00 IST	Eche (yellow card) 41'; Nirmal (yellow card) 88'	Report		Stadium: Salt Lake Stadium; Referee: M.V.Santosh Kumar

24 March 2013 21	Pailan Arrows	2–3	Mohun Bagan	Kalyani
14:00 IST	Shaiju 41'; Len 49'; Kotal (yellow card) 60'	Report	Aibor 5'; Tolgay 19', 20'; Denson (yellow card) 55'; Sabeeth (yellow card) 88'	Stadium: Kalyani Stadium; Referee: M.V.Santosh Kumar

28 March 2013 22	Mohun Bagan	2–2	Shillong Lajong	Kalyani
14:00 IST	Tolgay 52'; Maithani 60'; Quinton (yellow card) 65'; Lalrin (yellow card) 90+1'	Report	B.Haokip 53'; Lalhlimthara 79', (yellow card) 85'	Stadium: Kalyani Stadium; Referee: U.Bora

31 March 2013 15	Mohun Bagan	2–1	Dempo	Kolkata
14:00 IST	Nabi 7'; Odafa 47'; Eche (yellow card) 90+1'	Report	Carvalho 51'; Miranda (yellow card) 9'	Stadium: Salt Lake Stadium; Referee: C.R.Srikrishna

7 April 2013 23	Sporting Goa	1–5	Mohun Bagan	Vasco
16:00 IST	Kalu 76' (pen.), (yellow card) 85'; Dawson (yellow card) 33' (yellow-red card) 37'; M.Gonsalves (yellow card) 42'; Lourenco (yellow card) 90+2'	Report	Odafa 52' (pen.), 82', 90', (yellow card) 55'; Tolgay 73', 80'; Denson (yellow card) 23'; Maithani (yellow card) 26'; Aibor (yellow card) 75'	Stadium: Tilak Maidan; Referee: A.Shekar

10 April 2013 14	Mohun Bagan	3–2	Mumbai	Kalyani
15:30 IST	Tolgay 35'; Odafa 52', 90+6'; Denson (yellow card) 43'	Report	Caldeira 56'; Coutinho 88'	Stadium: Kalyani Stadium; Referee: C.R.Srikrishna

13 April 2013 24	Mohun Bagan	3–2	Air India	Kalyani
15:30 IST	Odafa 11' (pen.); Tolgay 28'; Denson 90+4'; Eche (yellow card) 1' (yellow-red card) 85'; Snehasish (yellow card) 45'	Report	Henry 38'; Branco 90+2', (yellow card) 84'; Bubai (red card) 68'; Bheke 89'	Stadium: Kalyani Stadium; Referee: P.Singh

21 April 2013 25	Mohun Bagan	0–2	Churchill Brothers	Kalyani
15:30 IST	Jewel (yellow card) 90+4'	Report	Antchouet 19', 34'; A.Fernandes (yellow card) 82'	Stadium: Kalyani Stadium; Referee: C.R.Srikrishna

24 April 2013 16	Mohun Bagan	1–3	Pune	Kalyani
15:30 IST	Odafa 90+3'	Report	Douhou 27'; Moga 65'; Tsewang 77'	Stadium: Kalyani Stadium; Referee: U.Bora

28 April 2013 11	Mohun Bagan	2–0	Pailan Arrows	Kalyani
15:30 IST	Odafa 26'; Quinton 50'; Aibor (yellow card) 47'	Report		Stadium: Kalyani Stadium; Referee: R.Dsa

7 May 2013 13	Churchill Brothers	1–1	Mohun Bagan	Vasco
18:30 IST	Sunil 72'; D.Franco (yellow card) 89'	Report	Sabeeth 27'; Denson (yellow card) 12'; Eche (yellow card) 29'; Shilton (yellow card) 31'; Bhargav (yellow card) 53'	Stadium: Tilak Maidan; Referee: A.Rowan

12 May 2013 26	United Sikkim	0–3	Mohun Bagan	Gangtok
18:30 IST	R.Debnath (yellow card) 70'	Report	Nitmal 9'; Odafa 71' (pen.); Tolgay 88'; Aibor (yellow card) 48'	Stadium: Paljor Stadium; Referee: A.Meetei

=== IFA Shield ===
5 March 2013 Group stage	Mohun Bagan	4–0	Pune	Kalyani
15:00 IST	Sabeeth 4', 53'; Odafa 30'; Denson 80'; Aibor (yellow card) 45'	Report		Stadium: Kalyani Stadium

8 March 2013 Group stage	Mohun Bagan	5–1	United Sikkim	Kalyani
15:00 IST	Odafa 30', 68', 86', 92', 95'; Maithani (yellow card) 79'; Tolgay (yellow card) 82'	Report	Nuruddin 71'	Stadium: Kalyani Stadium

10 March 2013 Group stage	Mohun Bagan	0–1	(Costa Rica) Deportivo Saprissa	Kalyani
15:00 IST	Nirmal (yellow card) 9'; Bhargav (yellow card) 75'; Odafa (yellow card) 90+8'	Report	Centeno 77'	Stadium: Kalyani Stadium

17 March 2013 Semi finals	East Bengal	1–1 (a.e.t.) (4–2 p)	Mohun Bagan	Kolkata
17:30 IST	Sabeeth 46', (yellow card) 86'; Nirmal (yellow card) 10'; Eche (yellow card) 77'; Jewel (yellow card) 78'; Denson (yellow card) 97'	Report	Barisic 88'	Stadium: Salt Lake Stadium
	Penalties
	Chidi (penalty scored); Barisic (penalty scored); Sanju (penalty scored); Naoba (penalty missed); Baljit (penalty scored)		Odafa (penalty missed); Nirmal (penalty missed); Jewel (penalty scored); Aibor (penalty scored)

== Notes ==
1. Mohun Bagan refused to play the two opening matches of the Calcutta Football League against Southern Samity and Tollygunge Agragami citing the unavailability of important players of the squad because of national duty. Subsequently, the IFA decided to announce Southern Samity and Tollygunge Agragami as winners of their respective matches with Mohun Bagan.
2. Mohun Bagan were declared winners of the 2012 Airlines Cup after Mohammedan refused to play the final due to excessive rescheduling of the final match. The tournament committee took the decision of giving a walkover to Mohun Bagan.
3. Mohun Bagan denied to take the field in the second half of the derby match against East Bengal citing crowd violence. Subsequently, the match was awarded 3–0 to East Bengal by the All India Football Federation. Mohun Bagan were also suspended by the Federation from the I-League for 2 years which was later reduced to a hefty fine and resetting of all points in the I-League table.
4. Odafa Onyeka Okolie was suspended for one match in addition to the two match suspension he received as a result of the direct red card he picked up in the match against East Bengal on 9 December 2012.
