= I-League transfers for summer 2012 =

This is a list of the transfers for the 2012–13 I-League season. Additionally, players without a club may join at any time, clubs below I-League level may sign players on loan at any time, and clubs may sign a goalkeeper on an emergency loan if they have no registered goalkeeper available.

== Transfers ==
All clubs without a flag are Indian.

Date	Name	Moving from	Moving to	Fee
6 May 2012	(Nigeria) Chidi Edeh	Salgaocar	Released	
6 May 2012	(France) Maxime Belouet	Salgaocar	Released	
6 May 2012	(Namibia) Quinton Jacobs	United Sikkim	Salgaocar	Free
6 May 2012	(Nigeria) Jagaba Hamza	HAL	Salgaocar	Free
6 May 2012	(Brazil) José Barreto	Mohun Bagan	Mutual Agreement	
9 May 2012	(India) Subrata Pal	Pune	Prayag United	Free
9 May 2012	(India) Baldeep Singh	Pune	Prayag United	Free
10 May 2012	(India) Zakeer Mundampara	Churchill Brothers	Prayag United	Free
10 May 2012	(India) Asif Kottayil	Chirag United Kerala	Prayag United	Free
11 May 2012	(Brazil) José Barreto	Unattached	Bhawanipore	Free
12 May 2012	(India) Malemngamba Meetei	HAL	Salgaocar	Free
14 May 2012	(India) Snehashish Dutta	Prayag United	Mohun Bagan	Free
14 May 2012	(India) Rajib Ghosh	Pailan Arrows	Mohun Bagan	Free
14 May 2012	(India) Safar Sardar	Mohammedan	East Bengal	Free
16 May 2012	(India) Sabas Saleel	Chirag United Kerala	United Sikkim	Free
16 May 2012	(India) C. S. Sabeeth	Pailan Arrows	Mohun Bagan	Free
16 May 2012	(India) Naveen Kumar	Pailan Arrows	Mohun Bagan	Free
17 May 2012	(India) Vikram Gill	Unattached	United Sikkim	Academy Product
18 May 2012	(India) Ishfaq Ahmed	Salgaocar	East Bengal	Free
18 May 2012	(Japan) Ryuji Sueoka	Salgaocar	Released	
18 May 2012	(Nigeria) Chidi Edeh	Unattached	East Bengal	Free
19 May 2012	(India) Nirmal Chhetri	East Bengal	Mohun Bagan	Free
20 May 2012	(India) Ashim Biswas	Mohun Bagan	Mohammedan	Free
22 May 2012	(India) Gouramangi Singh	Churchill Brothers	Prayag United	Free
22 May 2012	(India) Ravinder Singh	East Bengal	Prayag United	Free
22 May 2012	(India) Ishan Debnath	Mumbai	Prayag United	Free
22 May 2012	(India) Gour Naskar	Southern Samity	Prayag United	Free
22 May 2012	(Nigeria) Stanley Okoroigwe	Mohammedan	Mohun Bagan	Free
22 May 2012	(Nigeria) Echezona Anyichie	Southern Samity	Mohun Bagan	Free
22 May 2012	(India) Dipendu Biswas	Mohammedan	Mohun Bagan	Free
22 May 2012	(India) Arindam Bhattacharya	Churchill Brothers	Mohun Bagan	Free
22 May 2012	(India) Mehrajuddin Wadoo	Salgaocar S.C.	Mohun Bagan	Free
22 May 2012	(India) Denson Devadas	Prayag United	Mohun Bagan	Free
22 May 2012	(India) Aibor Khongjee	Shillong Lajong F.C.	Mohun Bagan	Free
22 May 2012	(India) Khelemba Singh	Salgaocar S.C.	Mohun Bagan	Free
22 May 2012	(India) Bijendra Rai	Pailan Arrows	Mohun Bagan	Free
22 May 2012	(India) L Lalrinfela	Southern Samity	Mohun Bagan	Free
22 May 2012	(India) Jaspal Parmar	Salgaocar S.C.	East Bengal	Free
22 May 2012	(India) Lalrindika Ralte	Churchill Brothers	East Bengal	Free
22 May 2012	(India) Jagpreet Singh	Churchill Brothers	East Bengal	Free
22 May 2012	(India) Arnab Mondal	Prayag United	East Bengal	Free
22 May 2012	(India) Abhijit Mondal	Prayag United	East Bengal	Free
22 May 2012	(India) Priyant Singh	Mohammedan	East Bengal	Free
22 May 2012	(India) Cavin Lobo	Mumbai	East Bengal	Free
22 May 2012	(India) Manandeep Singh	Air India	East Bengal	Free
23 May 2012	(Nigeria) Salau Nuruddin	Green Valley	United Sikkim	Free
23 May 2012	(Nigeria) David Opara	Churchill Brothers	Released	
23 May 2012	(Australia) Antun Kovacic	Churchill Brothers	Released	
23 May 2012	(India) Tapan Maity	Mohammedan	Prayag United	Free
24 May 2012	(India) Budhiram Tudu	East Bengal	United Sikkim	Free
26 May 2012	(Brazil) Hudson Lima	Mohun Bagan	Released	
26 May 2012	(Brazil) Edmilson	East Bengal	Released	
27 May 2012	(India) Mohammed Rafi	Churchill Brothers	Mumbai Tigers	Free
27 May 2012	(India) Paresh Shivalkar	Pune	Mumbai Tigers	Free
27 May 2012	(India) Pappachen Pradeep	Mohun Bagan	Mumbai Tigers	Free
27 May 2012	(India) Khangemban Thoi Singh	United Sikkim	Mumbai Tigers	Free
27 May 2012	(India) Kali Alaudeen	Air India	Mumbai Tigers	Free
27 May 2012	(India) Rahul Kumar	Salgaocar	Mumbai Tigers	Free
27 May 2012	(India) Sunil Kumar	East Bengal	Mumbai Tigers	Free
27 May 2012	(India) Surojit Bose	Mohammedan	Mumbai Tigers	Free
27 May 2012	(India) Loukik Jadhav	Pailan Arrows	Mumbai Tigers	Free
27 May 2012	(India) Arup Debnath	Air India	Mumbai Tigers	Free
27 May 2012	(South Korea) Park Jae-hyun	Sporting Goa	Released	
29 May 2012	(India) Sandip Nandy	East Bengal	Churchill Brothers	Free
29 May 2012	(Nigeria) Ranti Martins	Dempo	Prayag United	Free
29 May 2012	(Japan) Ryuji Sueoka	Salgaocar	Dempo	Free
30 May 2012	(Japan) Yusuke Kato	Dempo	Released	
31 May 2012	(India) Tomba Singh	Salgaocar	Churchill Brothers	Free
31 May 2012	(India) Gurtej Singh	Pailan Arrows	Churchill Brothers	Free
31 May 2012	(India) Bikramjit Singh	Pailan Arrows	Churchill Brothers	Free
1 June 2012	(Brazil) Josimar	Prayag United	Released	
1 June 2012	(New Zealand) Kayne Vincent	Prayag United	Released	
1 June 2012	(Ghana) Yusif Yakubu	Prayag United	Released	
1 June 2012	(India) Sangram Mukherjee	Mohun Bagan	Prayag United	Free
2 June 2012	(India) Jayanta Sen	Prayag United	Mohammedan	Free
2 June 2012	(Nepal) Rohit Chand	HAL	Contract Expired	
5 June 2012	(Nigeria) John Babatunde	United Sikkim	Released	
5 June 2012	(Guinea) Mandjou Keita	Pune	(Malaysia) Kelantan FA	Free
6 June 2012	(Australia) Matthew Mayora	Shillong Lajong	(Australia) Sydney Olympic	Free
6 June 2012	(India) Gouranga Dutta	Mohun Bagan	Mohammedan	Free
7 June 2012	(India) Micky Fernandes	Dempo	Mumbai	Free
7 June 2012	(India) William Colaco	Dempo	Mumbai	Free
8 June 2012	(India) Gobind Singh	United Sikkim	Shillong Lajong	Free
8 June 2012	(India) Jibon Singh	Pailan Arrows	Shillong Lajong	Free
8 June 2012	(India) Basant Singh	United Sikkim	Shillong Lajong	Free
8 June 2012	(India) Rollingson Hungyo	Pune	Shillong Lajong	Free
8 June 2012	(North Korea) Minchol Son	(Japan) FC Korea	Shillong Lajong	Free
9 June 2012	(India) Collin Abranches	Air India	Salgaocar	Free
9 June 2012	(India) Royston Dsouza	Air India	Salgaocar	Free
9 June 2012	(India) Bijay Basfore	Air India	Salgaocar	Free
9 June 2012	(India) Sandesh Gadkari	Air India	Salgaocar	Free
9 June 2012	(India) Chhangte Malswamkima	Mumbai	Salgaocar	Free
9 June 2012	(India) Pawan Kumar	Air India	Salgaocar	Free
9 June 2012	(India) Karan Sawhney	Tata Football Academy	Salgaocar	Free
9 June 2012	(India) Keegan Pereira	Mumbai	Salgaocar	Free
9 June 2012	(India) Karan Atwal	United Sikkim	Salgaocar	Free
9 June 2012	(India) Anthony D'Souza	Sporting Clube de Goa	Salgaocar	Free
9 June 2012	(India) Brian Mascarenhas	Dempo	Salgaocar	Free
9 June 2012	(India) Tomarjit Singh	Neroca Manipur	Salgaocar	Free
9 June 2012	(India) Kishan Singh	Mohun Bagan	Salgaocar	Free
11 June 2012	(India) Lester Fernandez	Pune	Prayag United	₹ 20 lakh
13 June 2012	(India) Warundeep Singh	Sporting Goa	Mohun Bagan	Free
15 June 2012	(India) Kingshuk Debnath	Mohun Bagan	Mohammedan	Free
16 June 2012	(India) Dada Nabeel	Unattached	Salgaocar	Free
16 June 2012	(India) Souvik Chakraborty	Mohun Bagan	Air India	Free
19 June 2012	(India) Jayabrata Dhar	Tata FA	Pailan Arrows	Free
19 June 2012	(India) Pankaj Sona	Tata FA	Pailan Arrows	Free
19 June 2012	(India) Siam Hangal	Tata FA	Pailan Arrows	Free
19 June 2012	(India) Ravinder Singh	Tata FA	Pailan Arrows	Free
19 June 2012	(India) Chingkhei Yumnam	Tata FA	Pailan Arrows	Free
19 June 2012	(India) Irfan Khan	Tata FA	Pailan Arrows	Free
19 June 2012	(India) Randhan Meetei	Tata FA	Pailan Arrows	Free
19 June 2012	(India) Simranjeet Singh	Tata FA	Pailan Arrows	Free
19 June 2012	(India) Karan Sawhney	Tata FA	Salgaocar	Free
20 June 2012	(India) Dominic Noronha	Dempo	Salgaocar	Free
20 June 2012	(India) Warundeep Singh	Sporting Goa	Mohun Bagan	Free
21 June 2012	(India) Angelo Colaco	Vasco	Salgaocar	Free
23 June 2012	(India) Nallappan Mohanraj	Mohun Bagan	Pune	Free
25 June 2012	(South Sudan) James Moga	Sporting Goa	Pune	Free
27 June 2012	(India) Vellito D’Cruz	Margao	Sporting Goa	Free
27 June 2012	(India) Joseph Clemete	Margao	Sporting Goa	Free
27 June 2012	(India) Agnelo Gomes	Margao	Sporting Goa	Free
27 June 2012	(India) Ashlon Oliveira	Margao	Salgaocar	Free
27 June 2012	(India) Valente Silva	Margao	Pune	Free
27 June 2012	(India) Valentino Rocha	Margao	Pune	Free
28 June 2012	(Costa Rica) Carlos Hernández	Unattached	Prayag United	Free
29 June 2012	(India) Pratesh Shirodkar	SESA	Sporting Goa	Free
29 June 2012	(India) Valerie Dsouaza	SESA	Sporting Goa	Free
29 June 2012	(India) Saurav Chakravarthy	Bhawanipore	Sporting Goa	Free
29 June 2012	(India) Weilling Fernandes	Goa Velha	Sporting Goa	Free
29 June 2012	(India) Keenan Almeida	Salgaocar	Sporting Goa	Free
1 July 2012	(India) Abhra Mondal	Pune	East Bengal	Loan period ended
2 July 2012	(India) Nickson Castana	Wilred Lesiure	Dempo	Free
2 July 2012	(India) John Dias	Unattached	Air India	Free
5 July 2012	(India) Sunil Chhetri	Unattached	(Portugal) Sporting CP	Free
6 July 2012	(India) Shaiju Mon	Chirag Kerala	Pailan Arrows	Free
7 July 2012	(India) Anil Kumar	Unattached	Mohun Bagan	Free
8 July 2012	(India) Mumtaz Akhtar	United Sikkim	Pune	Free
9 July 2012	(Ghana) Evans Quao	Unattached	Mumbai	Free
10 July 2012	(India) Justin Stephen	Prayag United	Mumbai	Free
10 July 2012	(India) James Singh	HAL	Mumbai	Free
10 July 2012	(India) Kamaljeet Kumar	Pune	Mumbai	Free
10 July 2012	(India) Gabriel Fernandes	Sporting Goa	Mumbai	Free
10 July 2012	(India) Kunal Sawant	Air India	Mumbai	Free
11 July 2012	(India) Abhra Mondal	East Bengal	Pune	Free
12 July 2012	(India) Arjun Chatterjee	Prayag United	Mohun Bagan	Free
13 July 2012	(Lebanon) Bilal Najjarin	(Lebanon) Nejmeh SC	Churchill Brothers	Free
13 July 2012	(India) Ajay Singh	Pailan Arrows	Churchill Brothers	Free
13 July 2012	(India) Bilal Khan	Tata FA	Churchill Brothers	Free
13 July 2012	(India) Manpreet Singh	Tata FA	Churchill Brothers	Free
13 July 2012	(India) Sanjay Balmuchu	Tata FA	Churchill Brothers	Free
16 July 2012	(India) Kamardeep Singh	Pune F.C. Academy	Pune	Academy Product
16 July 2012	(India) Suji Kumar	Pune F.C. Academy	Pune	Academy Product
23 July 2012	(Lebanon) Akram Moghrabi	(Lebanon) Nejmeh SC	Churchill Brothers	Free
23 July 2012	(Nigeria) David Opara	Unattached	Mumbai	Free
23 July 2012	(Ghana) Bong Bertrand	(Qatar) Al-Shamal	Sporting Goa	Free
27 July 2012	(India) Tshering Lepcha	Unattached	United Sikkim	Free
27 July 2012	(India) Ashish Chettri	Unattached	United Sikkim	Free
27 July 2012	(India) Nadong Bhutia	Unattached	United Sikkim	Free
27 July 2012	(India) Mobin Rai	Unattached	United Sikkim	Free
30 July 2012	(India) Zohmingliana Ralte	Shillong Lajong	Pune	Free
1 August 2012	(Ghana) Yusif Yakubu	Unattached	Mumbai	Free
13 August 2012	(Liberia) James Gbilee	Shillong Lajong	Kalighat MS	Free
14 August 2012	(Australia) Sean Rooney	(Indonesia) Deltras	Salgaocar	Free
14 August 2012	(Australia) Tolgay Özbey	East Bengal	Released	
15 August 2012	(India) Nirapada Mondal	Green Valley	Mohun Bagan	Free
17 August 2012	(Indonesia) Gbeneme Friday	Mumbai	Shillong Lajong	Free
17 August 2012	(Nigeria) Jagaba Hamza	Salgaocar	Released	
17 August 2012	(Philippines) Ángel Guirado	(Philippines) Global	Salgaocar	Free
20 August 2012	(India) Nikhil Kadam	Pune F.C. Academy	Pune	Academy Product
22 August 2012	(England) Rohan Ricketts	Unattached	Dempo	Free
25 August 2012	(Costa Rica) Michael Rodríguez	(Costa Rica) Herediano	United Sikkim	Free
