= 2013 IFA Shield =

২০১৩ আইএফএ শিল্ড

Tournament details
- Country: India
- Teams: 8

Final positions
- Champions: Prayag United (1st title)
- Runners-up: East Bengal

Tournament statistics
- Matches played: 15
- Goals scored: 44 (2.93 per match)
- Top goal scorer: Odafe Onyeka Okolie (6)

The 2013 IFA Shield was the 117th edition of the IFA Shield. The tournament this season was held from 4 March 2013 in West Bengal. This year also, the Indian Football Association announced that two foreign clubs would participate in the tournament, Costa Rican Primera División club Deportivo Saprissa and Bangladesh Premier League club Muktijoddha Sangsad. However on 4 March 2013 it was announced that Muktijoddha Sangsad would not participate in this tournament and instead current I-League club ONGC would take their place.

Prayag United won their maiden title by defeating East Bengal in the final.

== Teams ==
Siliguri Group	Kalyani Group
(India) East Bengal; (India) ONGC; (India) Pailan Arrows; (India) Prayag United	(Costa Rica) Deportivo Saprissa; (India) Mohun Bagan; (India) Pune; (India) United Sikkim

== Group stage ==
=== Group A ===
Team	Pld	W	D	L	GF	GA	GD	Pts
East Bengal	3	3	0	0	5	1	+4	9
Prayag United	3	2	0	1	7	3	+4	6
ONGC	3	1	0	2	4	5	−1	3
Pailan Arrows	3	0	0	3	1	8	−7	0

3 March 2013

East Bengal	1–0	Pailan Arrows
Edeh 35'	Report

Kanchenjunga Stadium, Siliguri

5 March 2013

Prayag United	5–0	Pailan Arrows
Hernández 12'; Martins 28' (pen.), 65' (pen.); Oraon 55'; Vincent 74'	Report

Kanchenjunga Stadium, Siliguri

6 March 2013

East Bengal	2–1	ONGC
Barisic 20'; Singh 90+3' (pen.)	Report	Lalmuanpuia 42'

Kanchenjunga Stadium, Siliguri

8 March 2013

Prayag United	0–2	East Bengal
	Report	Edeh 51', 75'

Kanchenjunga Stadium, Siliguri

9 March 2013

Pailan Arrows	1–2	ONGC
Mon	Report	Patil; Yusa

Kanchenjunga Stadium, Siliguri

11 March 2013

Prayag United	2–1	ONGC
Hernández 35'; Rafique 50'	Report	Singh 42'

Kanchenjunga Stadium, Siliguri

=== Group B ===
Team	Pld	W	D	L	GF	GA	GD	Pts
Deportivo Saprissa	3	2	1	0	4	1	+3	7
Mohun Bagan	3	2	0	1	8	2	+6	6
Pune	3	1	1	1	6	4	+2	4
United Sikkim	3	0	0	3	3	14	−11	0

5 March 2013

Mohun Bagan	3–0	Pune
Sabeeth 4', 52'; Okolie 29'	Report

Kalyani Stadium, Kalyani

7 March 2013

Deportivo Saprissa	0–0	Pune
	Report

Kalyani Stadium, Kalyani

8 March 2013

Mohun Bagan	5–1	United Sikkim
Okolie 30', 67', 86', 92', 95'	Report	Rodríguez 71'

Kalyani Stadium, Kalyani

10 March 2013

Mohun Bagan	0–1	Deportivo Saprissa
	Report	Centeno 76'

Kalyani Stadium, Kalyani

10 March 2013

Pune	6–1	United Sikkim
Karpeh 6'; Moga 26', 65', 75'; Ralte 47'; Singh 87'	Report	Rodríguez 23'

Salt Lake Stadium, Kolkata

12 March 2013

Deportivo Saprissa	3–1	United Sikkim
Centeno 37' (pen.); Chávez 80'; Montero 88'	Report	Rodríguez 25'

Salt Lake Stadium, Kolkata

== Semi-finals ==
15 March 2013

Deportivo Saprissa	1–2 (a.e.t.)	Prayag United
Moya 27'	Report (archived)	Rafique 26'; Vincent 105'

Kalyani Stadium, Kalyani

17 March 2013

East Bengal	1–1 (a.e.t.)	Mohun Bagan
Barisic 88'	Report	Sabeeth 46'
Penalties
Edeh (penalty scored); Barisic (penalty scored); Pradhan (penalty scored); Singh (penalty missed); Sahni (penalty scored)	4 – 2	(penalty missed) Okolie; (penalty missed) Chettri; (penalty scored) Raja; (penalty scored) Khongjee

Salt Lake Stadium, Kolkata
Attendance: 70,000 (estimated)

== Final ==
20 March 2013

Prayag United	1–0	East Bengal
Martins 79'	Report

Salt Lake Stadium, Kolkata

== Goalscorers ==
6 Goals

- (Nigeria) Odafe Onyeka Okolie (Mohun Bagan)

3 Goals

- (India) Chinadorai Sabeeth (Mohun Bagan)
- (Nigeria) Ranti Martins (Prayag United)
- (Nigeria) Chidi Edeh (East Bengal)
- (South Sudan) James Moga (Pune)
- (Spain) Pablo Rodríguez (United Sikkim)

2 Goals

- (Australia) Andrew Barisic (East Bengal)
- (Costa Rica) Carlos Hernández (Prayag United)
- (Costa Rica) Walter Centeno (Deportivo Saprissa B)
- (India) Mohammed Rafique (Prayag United)
- (New Zealand) Kayne Vincent (Prayag United)

1 Goal

- (Australia) Boima Karpeh (Pune)
- (Costa Rica) Diego Chavez (Deportivo Saprissa B)
- (Costa Rica) Joel Montero (Deportivo Saprissa B)
- (Costa Rica) Jonathan Moya (Deportivo Saprissa B)
- (India) Fanai Lalmuanpuia (ONGC)
- (India) Jatin Singh (ONGC)
- (India) Kailash Patil (ONGC)
- (India) Manandeep Singh (East Bengal)
- (India) Shaiju Mon (Pailan Arrows)
- (India) Shankar Oraon (Prayag United)
- (India) Subhash Singh (Pune)
- (India) Zohmingliana Ralte (Pune)
- (Japan) Katsumi Yusa (ONGC)
