= 2011–12 Mohun Bagan FC season =

Indian football club season

Mohun Bagan
2011–12 season
- Chairman: Siddharth Mallya
- Head coach: Stephen David Darby (until 15.10.2011); Prasanta Banerjee(From 19.10.11)
- Stadium: Salt Lake Stadium; Kalyani Stadium
- I-League: 4th
- Calcutta Football League: Runners-up
- Federation Cup: Group stage
- Top goalscorer: League: Odafa (26); All: Odafa (36)

The 2011–12 Mohun Bagan Football Club season was the club's 5th season in I-League and 122nd season since its establishment in 1889. The team finished runners-up in the Calcutta Football League and fourth in the I-League with 47 points in 26 games, winning 13, drawing 8, and losing 5 in the process. Mohun Bagan were also knocked out in the group stage of the Federation Cup, where they failed to win a single match.

Odafa Okolie was their top goalscorer during the season, scoring 36 goals. The three time I-League golden boot winner had been the biggest signing of the season, contracted to a $320,000 a year deal.

== Squad ==
Note: Flags indicate national team as defined under FIFA eligibility rules; some limited exceptions apply. Players may hold more than one non-FIFA nationality.

No.	Pos.	Nation	Player
—	GK	IND	Sangram Mukherjee
—	GK	IND	Shilton Paul
—	GK	IND	Souvik Mondal
—	GK	IND	Sudipto Banerjee
—	DF	IND	Anwar Ali
—	DF	IND	Rakesh Masih
—	DF	IND	Sourav Chakraborty
—	DF	IND	Surkumar Singh
—	DF	IND	Dhanrajan
—	DF	IND	N Mohonraj
—	DD	IND	Kingshuk Debnath
—	DF	AUS	Simon Storey
—	MF	IND	Jewel Raja
—	MF	IND	Snehasish Chakraborty
—	MF	IND	Manish Mathani

No.	Pos.	Nation	Player
—	MF	IND	Souvik Chakraborty
—	MF	IND	Dipendu Duari
—	MF	IND	Gouranga Dutta
—	MF	IND	Bungo Singh
—	MF	IND	NP Pradeep
—	MF	IND	Satish Kumar (JR)
—	CM	IND	Murali Joseph
—	MF	IND	Syed Rahim Nabi
—	CM	IND	Sakhtar Singh
—	CM	BRA	Hudson Lima Silva
—	FW	NGR	Odafa Onyeka Okolie
—	FW	BRA	José Barreto
—	FW	IND	Sunil Chhetri
—	FW	IND	Jagtar Singh
—	FW	IND	Ashim Biswas

== Overview ==
=== Overview ===
Competition	First match (round)	Latest match (round)	Final position
I-League	23 October; Matchday 1	6 May; Matchday 26	4th
Federation Cup	17 September; Group Stage: Match 1	21 September; Group Stage: Match 3	Group Stage
Calcutta Football League	13 November Match 1	14 May Match 10	Runners

Competition	Record							
Competition	Pld	W	D	L	GF	GA	GD	Win %
I-League	26	13	8	5	51	32	+19	50.00
Federation Cup	3	0	1	2	4	7	−3	0.00
CFL	10	6	2	2	19	8	+11	60.00
Total	39	19	11	9	74	47	+27	48.72

Last updated: 14 May 2011
Source: Competitions

== I-League ==
=== League table ===
Pos	Team	Pld	W	D	L	GF	GA	GD	Pts	Qualification or relegation
1	Dempo (C)	26	18	3	5	59	21	+38	57	
2	East Bengal	26	15	6	5	46	22	+24	51	2013 AFC Cup Group stage (Note: East Bengal, the winner of the 2012 Indian Federation Cup, qualified for the 2013 AFC Cup.)
3	Churchill Brothers	26	14	6	6	47	28	+19	48	2013 AFC Cup Group stage (Note: Dempo refused to enter the 2013 AFC Cup, so they were replaced by Churchill Brothers.)
4	Mohun Bagan	26	13	8	5	51	32	+19	47	
5	Pune	26	13	7	6	44	34	+10	46	
6	Salgaocar	26	12	8	6	32	19	+13	44	
7	Prayag United	26	11	9	6	41	32	+9	42	
8	Sporting Goa	26	11	7	8	53	43	+10	40	
9	Air India	26	9	5	12	30	37	−7	32	
10	Shillong Lajong	26	7	7	12	24	44	−20	28	
11	Mumbai	26	7	3	16	31	52	−21	24	
12	Chirag United Kerala (R)	26	6	2	18	28	50	−22	20	Relegation to 2013 I-League 2nd Division (Note: Pailan Arrows were not relegated in the season as they were a developmental team.)
13	Pailan Arrows	26	2	10	14	17	40	−23	16	
14	HAL (R)	26	1	5	20	19	68	−49	8	Relegation to 2013 I-League 2nd Division

Source: IndiaFooty.com
Rules for classification: 1) points; 2) goal difference; 3) number of goals scored.
(C) Champions; (R) Relegated

=== Results summary ===
Overall								Home						Away					
Pld	W	D	L	GF	GA	GD	Pts	W	D	L	GF	GA	GD	W	D	L	GF	GA	GD
26	13	8	5	51	32	+19	47	8	4	1	25	9	+16	5	4	4	26	23	+3

Last updated: 06 May 2011.
Source: FlashScore

=== Results by round ===
Round	1	2	3	4	5	6	7	8	9	10	11	12	13	14	15	16	17	18	19	20	21	22	23	24	25	26
Ground	A	H	A	A	H	H	A	A	A	H	H	H	A	A	A	H	H	A	A	H	A	H	H	H	A	H
Result	W	W	L	W	W	W	L	D	W	D	D	W	L	W	L	L	W	W	D	W	D	D	D	W	D	W

Source: Flashscore
A = Away; H = Home; W = Win; D = Draw; L = Loss

=== Fixtures & results ===
Win Draw Loss

23 October 2011 1	Pailan Arrows	1 – 3	Mohun Bagan	Salt Lake Stadium
15:00 IST	L Fenai 8'	Report; Flashscore; SoccerWay	Okolie 67', 73', 90+1'

28 October 2011 2	Mohun Bagan	2 - 1	Chirag United Kerala	Salt Lake Stadium
15:30 IST	Okolie 51'; Barreto 84'	Report	F. Chimaokwu 68'

2 November 2011 3	Dempo	5 - 0	Mohun Bagan	Jawaharlal Nehru Stadium Goa (Margao)
15:30 IST	Ranti Martins 9', 45'; Joaquim Santan 10', 46'; Samir Subash Naik 41'	Report

6 November 2011 4	Mumbai FC	1 - 5	Mohun Bagan	Shree Shiv Chhatrapati Sports Complex (Pune)
15:30 IST	Ebi Theopillus 90'	Report	Syed Rahim Nabi 22'; Sunil Chhetri 31', 86'; Ashim Biswas 62'; Jewel Raja 76'

10 November 2011 5	Mohun Bagan	3 - 0	Churchill Brothers	Salt Lake Stadium
18:30 IST	Sunil Chhetri 28'; Ashim Biswas 45'; Jewel Raja 90'	Report

20 November 2011 6	Mohun Bagan	1 – 0	East Bengal	Salt Lake Stadium
18:30 IST	Okolie 21' (pen.)	Report

23 November 2011 7	Prayag United	3 – 2	Mohun Bagan	Salt Lake Stadium
14:00 IST	Josimar 41'; Yusif Yakubu 56', 58'	Report	Snehasish Chakraborty 21'; Odafa 47'

2 December 2011 8	Shillong Lajong FC	0 – 0	Mohun Bagan	Jawaharlal Nehru Stadium (Shillong, Meghalaya)
14:00 IST		Report

14 December 2011 9	HAL	2 – 4	Mohun Bagan	Bangalore Football Stadium
15:00 IST	Narender Meetei 27'; Jagada Amaba 32'	Report	Odafa 60', 70'; Jewel Raja 88'; Manish Maithani 90+4'

17 December 2011 10	Mohun Bagan	1 – 1	Sporting Clube de Goa	Salt Lake Stadium
14:00 IST	Syed Rahim Nabi 72'	Report	Ogba Kalu 80' (pen.)

22 December 2011 11	Mohun Bagan	0 – 0	Salgaocar FC	Salt Lake Stadium
14:00 IST		Report

28 December 2011 12	Mohun Bagan	3 – 1	Air India	Salt Lake Stadium
14:00 IST	Odafa 42', 84'; Ashim Das 60'	Report	Muhammed Shafi 54'

03 January 2012 13	Pune	2 – 1	Mohun Bagan	Shree Shiv Chhatrapati Sports Complex (Pune)
18:30 IST	Jeje Lalpekhlua 36'; Lester Mark Fernendez 56'	Report	Odafa 22'

15 January 2012 14	Churchill Brothers	2 - 3	Mohun Bagan	Jawaharlal Nehru Stadium Goa (Margao)
15:30 IST	Lalrindika Ralte 4'; Henry Arnaud 81'	Report	Odafa 18', 74', 77' (pen.)

19 January 2012 15	Sporting Clube de Goa	2 - 1	Mohun Bagan	Jawaharlal Nehru Stadium Goa (Margao)
15:30 IST	Boubakar Keita 65'; Ogba Kalu 81'	Report	Rakesh Masih 71'

22 January 2012 16	Mohun Bagan	1 - 2	Prayag United	Salt Lake Stadium
14:00 IST	Ali 19'	Report	Kayne Vincent 16'; Deepak Kumar Mondal 64'

27 January 2012 17	Mohun Bagan	2 – 0	Pailan Arrows	Salt Lake Stadium
15:00 IST	Barreto 64'; Jewel Raja 76'	Report

31 January 2012 18	Chirag United Kerala	1 - 3	Mohun Bagan	Jawaharlal Nehru Stadium (Kochi)
15:30 IST	Anil Kumar 47'	Report	Okolie 37' (pen.), 84'; Barreto 86'

4 February 2012 19	East Bengal	1 - 1	Mohun Bagan	Salt Lake Stadium
14:00 IST	Singh 32'	Summary	Okolie 47'

11 February 2012 20	Mohun Bagan	2 - 1	Mumbai FC	Salt Lake Stadium
14:00 IST	Odafa 74' (pen.), 80'	Report	Friday Gbeneme 23'

26 March 2012 21	Air India	2 – 2	Mohun Bagan	The Cooperage Ground (Mumbai)
18:30 IST	Manandeep Singh 21', 39'	Report	Manish Maithani 19'; Odafa 60'

1 April 2012 22	Mohun Bagan	2 - 2	Dempo	Salt Lake Stadium
15:30 IST	Odafa 27', 34'	Report	Ranti Martins 6'; Koko Sakibo 77'

6 April 2012 23	Mohun Bagan	0 - 0	HAL	Salt Lake Stadium
15:30 IST		Report

10 April 2012 24	Mohun Bagan	6 - 1	Shillong Lajong FC	Salt Lake Stadium
15:30 IST	Syed Rahim Nabi 21'; Sunil Chhetri 24', 76'; Odafa 43', 50'; Barreto 61' (pen.)	Report	Subhash Singh 59'

14 April 2012 25	Salgaocar FC	1 - 1	Mohun Bagan	Jawaharlal Nehru Stadium Goa (Margao)
18:00 IST	Ishfaq Ahmed 47'	Report	Odafa 23'

6 May 2012 26	Mohun Bagan	2 - 0	Pune FC	Salt Lake Stadium
15:30 IST	Barreto 06'; Okolie 89'	Report

== Calcutta Football League (CFL) ==
=== Fixtures & results ===
Win Draw Loss

13 November 2011 Match 1	Mohun Bagan	2–1	Tollygunge	West Bengal, India
IST	Gouranga Dutta 24', 34'	Archive; MBAC	Okorogor 84'

25 November 2011 Match 2	Mohun Bagan	3–1	Peerless	West Bengal, India
1 IST	Snehasish Chakraborty 23', 76'; Odafa 80'	Archive; TOI	Waheed 32'	Stadium: Mohun Bagan Ground

28 November 2011 Match 3	Mohun Bagan	2–1	BNR	West Bengal, India
14:15 IST	Odafa 90+3', 90+5'	Archive; MBAC	Okorogor 84'	Stadium: Mohun Bagan Ground

8 December 2011 Match 4	Mohammedan Sporting	0–0	Mohun Bagan	West Bengal, India
IST		Archive; MBAC

11 December 2011 Match 5	Mohun Bagan	0–1	Police A.C.	West Bengal, India
IST		Archive; MBAC	Parahapratim Chakrabarty 32'

30 December 2011 6	Mohun Bagan	2–2	George Telegraph	Kolkata
	Jewel Raja 23'; Manish Bhargav 39'	Archived; MBAC	Emeka 64', 68' (pen.)	Stadium: Mohun Bagan Ground

7 January 2012 Match 7	East Bengal	0–2	Mohun Bagan	Kolkata
		MBAC	Odafa Onyeka Okolie 22'; Manish Bhargav 28'	Stadium: Salt Lake Stadium; Referee: Ravshan Irmatov

25 January 2012 Match 8	Mohun Bagan	2–0	Southern Samity	Kolkata
	Odafa Onyeka Okolie 80' (pen.); Sunil Chhetri 90'	MBAC		Stadium: Mohun Bagan Ground

25 March 2012 Match 9	Mohun Bagan	6–0	Aryan	Kolkata
	Odafa Onyeka Okolie 14', 17', 30', 44'; Syed Rahim Nabi 66' Manish Maithani 90+2'	MBAC		Stadium: Mohun Bagan Ground

14 May 2012 Match 10	Mohun Bagan	0–2	Prayag United	Kolkata
		MBAC

== Federation Cup ==
=== Group A ===
Group A will play in Pune

Team	Pld	W	D	L	GF	GA	GD	Pts
Shillong Lajong	3	2	0	1	5	4	+1	6
Royal Wahingdoh	3	2	0	1	4	3	+1	6
Churchill Brothers	3	1	1	1	4	3	+1	4
Mohun Bagan	3	0	1	2	2	5	−3	1

Source: SoccerWay

17 September 2011 1	Mohun Bagan	1 – 2	Royal Wahingdoh	Pune
	Ashim Das 58'	SportsKeeda; SoccerWay	Chencho 49', 54'

19 September 2011 2	Mohun Bagan	1 – 3	Shillong Lajong	Pune
	Odafa 75'	SportsKeeda; SoccerWay	P.C. Lahlimthara Mahlima 45'; John D. Menyongar 74'; James Giblee 81'

21 September 2011 3	Churchill Brothers	2 – 2	Mohun Bagan	Pune
	Henri Arnaud 23', 59'	SportsKeeda; SoccerWay	Barreto 41'; Sunil Chhetri 44'

== Stats ==
=== Goal scorers ===
Sl No.	Name	Nat	CFL	I-League	Federation Cup	Total
1	Odafa	(Nigeria)	9	26	1	36
2	Sunil Chhetri	(India)	1	5	1	7
3	Barreto	(Brazil)	0	5	1	6
4	Jewel Raja	(India)	1	4	0	5
5	Ashim Biswas	(India)	0	3	1	4
5	Syed Rahim Nabi	(India)	1	3	0	4
6	Manish Maithani	(India)	1	2	0	3
6	Snehasish Chakraborty	(India)	2	1	0	3
7	Manish Bhargav	(India)	2	0	0	2
7	Gouranga Dutta	(India)	2	0	0	2
8	Anwar Ali	(India)	0	1	0	1
8	Rakesh Masih	(India)	0	1	0	1
Total			19	51	4	74
