= Rajib Ghosh =

Rajib Ghosh may refer to:

- Rajib Ghosh (footballer) (born 1989), Indian footballer
- Rajib Ghosh (journalist) (1962–2021), Indian journalist
