= I-League transfers for the 2012–13 season =

This is a list of the transfers for the 2012–13 I-League season.

== Transfers ==
All clubs without a flag are Indian.

Date	Name	Moving from	Moving to	Mode of Transfer
3 September 2012	(Japan) Daisuke Nishiguchi	(Moldova) Olimpia	Pune	Free
3 September 2012	(Australia) Tolgay Özbey	East Bengal	Mohun Bagan	Free
16 September 2012	(Japan) Kayne Vincent	(Australia) Melbourne Knights	Prayag United	Free
16 September 2012	(Nigeria) Ebi Sukore	Mumbai	Shillong Lajong	Free
