= Rajib Ghosh (journalist) =

Indian journalist and author (1962–2021)

- রাজীব ঘোষ
- Born: 11 May 1962; Hazaribag, Jharkhand, India
- Died: 16 July 2021 (aged 59); Kolkata, West Bengal, India
- Education: Asutosh College; University of Calcutta
- Occupations: Journalist; author
- Spouse: Swarnali Ghosh
- Children: 1

Rajib Ghosh (Bengali: রাজীব ঘোষ) (11 May 1962 – 16 July 2021) was an Indian journalist and author from Kolkata, West Bengal, India.

== Early years ==
Rajib Ghosh was born to Sri Anil Kumar Ghosh and Smt. Sheila Ghosh in Hazaribagh. He started his schooling at St. Xavier's School of Hazaribagh. He joined Jodhpur Park Boys School in class six. After the Higher Secondary examination in 1979 he joined Asutosh College of Kolkata and graduated with Honors in Chemistry. Later he completed studies in Journalism from the University of Calcutta.

== Career ==
Rajib started a career in journalism in 1983, and joined the news daily Pashchimbanga Sangbad (Bengali: পশ্চিমবঙ্গ সংবাদ). In 1984, Rajib joined the news daily Bartamaan at its initiation. After some years he joined Bengali news daily Aajkaal (Bengali: আজকাল)and gradually showed his mettle in newspaper management and editing. He was working as the Joint Editor in Aajkaal Patrika at the time of his death. Rajib was also associated with Netaji Subhas Open University as a visiting faculty in journalism and mass communication.

== Literary works ==
Rajib wrote several books of popular reading, mostly imbibing humor from the life of the common man. The books he wrote are:

- Kotha O Kolkata (Bengali: কথা ও কলকাতা)
- Paratuto (Bengali: পাড়াতুতো)
- Khosh Golpo (Bengali: খোশগল্প)
- Bhojpuri (Bengali: ভোজপুরি)

== Social life ==
Rajib was an active member of the Press Club, Kolkata. He was associated with Tridara Sammiloni and engaged himself in many social activities.

== Death ==
On May 17, 2021, Rajib was admitted to a nursing home with symptoms of Covid-19. He was then shifted to M. R. Bangur Hospital. He developed post Covid pneumonia and was admitted to a private hospital in Kolkata. He died on 16 July, 2021.

Mamata Banerjee, Chief Minister of West Bengal, expressed her grief on the untimely demise of Rajib Ghosh in a press release. Kolkata Press Club expressed grief in its bulletin. He was married to Swarnali Ghosh. He had one son, Upanishad.
