= Nirmal Chettri =

Indian footballer (born 1990)

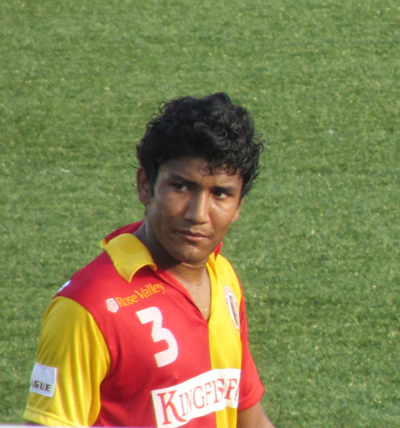
- Chettri with East Bengal in 2011

Personal information
- Full name: Nirmal Chettri
- Date of birth: 21 October 1990 (age 36)
- Place of birth: Melli, Sikkim, India
- Height: 1.77 m (5 ft 10 in)
- Position: Defender

Youth career
- 2000–2005: Namchi Sports Hostel
- 2005–2006: Sports Academy of Sikkim
- 2006: Sikkim

Senior career*
Years	Team	Apps	(Gls)
2006–2008	Air India		
2008–2012	East Bengal	125	(8)
2012–2013	Mohun Bagan	33	(3)
2013–2014	→ Mohammedan (loan)	12	(2)
2014–2015	Kerala Blasters	12	(0)
2014–2015	→ Dempo (loan)	16	(0)
2016-2018	NorthEast United	25	(0)
2017	→ DSK Shivajians (loan)	13	(0)
2018–2019	FC Goa		
2019–2020	RG Punjab	7	(0)
2022–2023	Southern Samity		

International career
2005	India U17		
2009–2013	India U23	9	(0)
2011–2014	India	19	(0)
- * Club domestic league appearances and goals

Nirmal Chettri (born 21 October 1990 in Melli, Sikkim) is an Indian professional footballer who plays as a defender.

== Club career ==
=== Early career ===
Chettri began his footballing career in 2000 with Namchi Sports Hostel after being discovered in the Sikkim governments Search for More Bhaichung's campaign (In reference to then India striker and Sikkimese-born Baichung Bhutia). In 2002 Chettri played for Namchi in the Subroto Cup where he led the team to the final, only to lose to Mizoram 1–2. He then represented Namchi in the Interreligious Peace Sports Festival in South Korea in 2004. In that same year he represented Namchi in the Chief Minister Gold Cup. Within those three years Chettri won 3 National Talent Scholarships from the AIFF. In 2005 Chettri joined Sports Academy of Sikkim and competed in the Mini SAARC. Chettri also played for Sikkim in the 2006–07 Santosh Trophy. After good performances with Sikkim Chettri was scouted and signed for Air India FC of the I-League in 2007. He stayed at Air India till 2008.

=== East Bengal ===
In 2008 Chettri signed for East Bengal F.C. of the I-League. He made his Asian debut in the AFC Cup in 2010 against Al-Ittihad Aleppo of Syria on 10 March. During a friendly match against FC Bayern Munich under 23s at Barasat, their manager Gerd Müller praised Chettri saying that "East Bengal's number three (Nirmal Chettri) was brilliant". Chettri replied to this by saying, "I am delighted with his (Gerd Muller) compliment as he was such a great player. It is always good to get such praise from great players but I will not get carried away and will work hard as I have a long way to go." He has established himself as a regular in East Bengal's first team sense.

=== Mohun Bagan ===
On 19 May 2012 Chettri signed with arch-rivals Mohun Bagan of the I-League. He made a dream debut in the green & maroon jersey scoring McDowell Mohun Bagan's opening goal in their 6–0 thrashing of West Bengal Police in the Calcutta Premier Division.

Chettri made his professional debut for Mohun Bagan on 20 September 2012 against Churchill Brothers during the club's opening match in the 2012 Indian Federation Cup where the club drew the match 0–0. On 12 May 2013 in the last match of the 2012-13 I-League, he was assisted by Denson Devadas on the 5th minute to score the 1st goal in the 3–0 victory over United Sikkim F.C. at the Paljor Stadium.

=== Mohammedan ===
On 26 November 2013 it was announced that Nirmal has signed for Mohammedan on loan from IMG RELIANCE.

=== Kerala Blasters ===
Kerala blasters have picked Nirmal for the upcoming ISL football league.

=== Dempo (loan) ===
After the 2014 season, Chettri signed with Dempo in the I-League on loan for the whole season.

=== FC Goa ===
Ahead of the 2018–19 season, Chettri was signed by FC Goa.

== International career ==
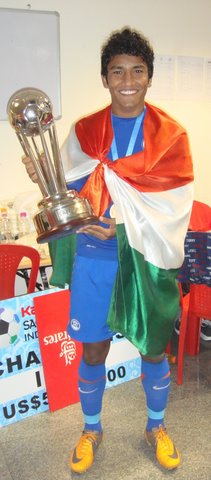
Chettri with SAFF Trophy

=== Youth ===
Chettri has earned caps for the India youth team at U17 and U23 level. Chettri also trained with the Under-14 team in Jharkhand in 2003 and 2004. Chettri represented the U17 team during the team's exposure trip to Portugal in 2005. Chettri was then selected for the India U23 team that was selected to take part in the 2009 SAFF Championship which the India senior team choose not to play in SAFF Cup due to practice arrangements for the 2011 AFC Asian Cup. He came on in the 115th minute in the final against Maldives on 13 December 2009 in which India U23 won on penalties 3–1. Nirmal missed his penalty and Maldives missed their penalties 3 times.

Chettri played for India U23 as well during the 2012 Olympic Qualifiers. He played in India U23's first match of qualification against Myanmar U23 on 23 February 2011. India U23 won 2–1.

=== Senior ===
Chettri made his senior international debut for India during the 2011 SAFF Championship against Bhutan on 5 December 2011, India won the match 5–0. Chettri then proceeded to play in India's next 4 games in the tournament which ended with the Final against Afghanistan on 11 December 2011 at the Jawaharlal Nehru Stadium in New Delhi. The game ended 4–0 in India's favour, thus giving Chettri his first major honour with the senior national team. Chettri was then selected in the India squad for the 2012 AFC Challenge Cup. During the tournament Chettri only played in one match and that was the last match against North Korea on 13 March 2012. India lost the match 0–4 but that did not matter as India was knock-out at the Group stage before the match. Nirmal has been a regular under new India coach Wim Koevermans also and played an important role in India's Nehru Cup 2012 triumph.

=== International ===
Statistics accurate as of 9 April 2015

National team		Apps	Goals
India	2011	4	0
India	2012	4	0
India	2013	7	0
India	Total	15	0

== Honours ==
East Bengal

- Federation Cup (India): 2009, 2010; runner-up: 2011
- Calcutta Premier Division: 2010, 2011
- Indian Super Cup: 2011

Mohammedan Sporting

- IFA Shield: 2014

Kerala Blasters

- Indian Super League runner-up: 2014

FC Goa

- Indian Super League runner-up: 2018–19
- Indian Super Cup: 2019

India

- SAFF Championship: 2011; runner-up: 2013
- Nehru Cup: 2012

India U23

- SAFF Championship: 2009

== Personal life ==
Chhetri is of Nepali origin.
