= India national youth football team =

India national youth football team can refer to the following age group teams:

- India national under-23 football team
- India national under-20 football team
- India national under-17 football team
