= 2010–11 I-League =

4th season of the I-League

I-League
- Season: 2010–11
- Dates: 3 December 2010 – 30 May 2011
- Champions: Salgaocar; 1st I-League title 2nd Indian title
- Relegated: JCT; ONGC
- AFC Cup: Salgaocar; East Bengal
- Matches: 182
- Goals: 489 (2.69 per match)
- Top goalscorer: Ranty Martins
- Biggest home win: Dempo 14–0 Air India
- Biggest away win: Mumbai 1–5 Churchill Brothers
- Highest scoring: Dempo 14–0 Air India
- Average attendance: 3913

The 2010–11 I-League was the fourth season of the I-League, which was the highest football league competition in India during the time. It ran from 3 December 2010 to May 2011. Dempo are the defending champions. On 30 May 2011 Salgaocar won the title by beating JCT 2–0 in the final match of the season.

== Teams ==
Sporting Clube de Goa and Shillong Lajong FC were relegated at the end of the 2009–10 season after finishing in the bottom two places of the table. They were replaced by 2010 Second Division champions ONGC FC and runners-up HAL SC.

In other team changes, Mahindra United were disbanded at the end of the 2009–10 season to concentrate on youth football. They were replaced by Indian Arrows, a newly founded team under the auspices of the AIFF.

Locations of teams in the 2010–11 I-League

Club	City	Stadium	Capacity
Air-India	Mumbai	Cooperage Ground, Mumbai	12,000
Chirag United	Kolkata	Salt Lake Stadium, Kolkata	120,000
Churchill Brothers	Margao, Goa	Fatorda Stadium, Margao	35,000
Dempo	Panjim	Fatorda Stadium, Margao	35,000
East Bengal	Kolkata	Salt Lake Stadium, Kolkata	120,000
HAL	Bangalore	Bangalore Stadium, Bangalore	15,000
Indian Arrows	New Delhi	Ambedkar Stadium, New Delhi	15,000
JCT	Phagwara	Guru Nanak Dev Stadium, Ludhiana	12,000
Mohun Bagan	Kolkata	Salt Lake Stadium, Kolkata	120,000
Mumbai	Mumbai	Cooperage Ground, Mumbai	12,000
ONGC	Mumbai	Rajarshi Shahu Stadium, Kolhapur	12,000
Pune	Pune	Shree Shiv Chhatrapati Sports Complex, Pune	20,000
Salgaocar	Vasco	Fatorda Stadium, Margao	35,000
Viva Kerala	Kozhikode	EMS Stadium	60,000

=== Managerial changes ===
Team	Outgoing manager	Manner of departure	Date of vacancy	Table	Incoming manager	Date of appointment
Churchill Brothers	(Brazil) Carlos Roberto Pereira	Resigned	End of Previous Season	pre-season	(Singapore) Vincent Subramaniam	2 July
East Bengal	(Belgium) Philippe De Ridder	Resigned	End of Previous Season	pre-season	(England) Trevor Morgan	16 July
Mohun Bagan	(India) Biswajit Bhattacharjee	Resigned	End of Previous Season	pre-season	(India) Stanley Rozario	4 June
Mohun Bagan	(India) Stanley Rozario	Resigned	13 Dec.	12	(India) Subhash Bhowmick	14 Dec.
Churchill Brothers	(Singapore) Vincent Subramaniam	Resigned	5 March	3rd	(Croatia) Drago Mamić	14 March

== League table ==
Pos	Team	Pld	W	D	L	GF	GA	GD	Pts	Qualification or relegation
1	Salgaocar (C)	26	18	2	6	58	27	+31	56	2012 AFC Cup Group stage
2	East Bengal	26	15	6	5	44	21	+23	51	2012 AFC Cup Group stage (Note: Since Salgaocar SC also won the 2011 Indian Federation Cup, East Bengal qualified for the 2012 AFC Cup as 2010–11 I-League runners-up.)
3	Dempo	26	15	5	6	63	34	+29	50	
4	Churchill Brothers	26	14	8	4	57	31	+26	50	
5	Pune	26	9	9	8	32	27	+5	36	
6	Mohun Bagan	26	8	10	8	34	32	+2	34	
7	Mumbai	26	9	7	10	24	28	−4	34	
8	Chirag United	26	5	14	7	31	36	−5	29	
9	Indian Arrows	26	7	8	11	31	49	−18	29	
10	Viva Kerala	26	6	9	11	30	36	−6	27	
12	Air India	26	5	9	12	25	57	−32	24	
12	HAL	26	6	6	14	18	40	−22	24	
13	JCT	26	6	6	14	17	35	−18	24	Relegation to 2012 I-League 2nd Division
14	ONGC	26	5	9	12	25	36	−11	24	Relegation to 2012 I-League 2nd Division

Source: IndiaFooty.com
Rules for classification: 1) points; 2) goal difference; 3) number of goals scored.
(C) Champions

== Results ==
Home \ Away	AI	CHI	CB	DEM	EB	HAL	IAR	JCT	MB	MUM	ONGC	PFC	SFC	VK
Air India		1–1	2–2	4–0	0–3	1–1	2–5	1–0	1–1	0–1	0–0	0–0	1–1	1–1
Chirag United	0–0		3–5	2–4	0–0	1–0	2–1	0–0	1–1	0–1	4–2	1–0	1–4	1–1
Churchill Brothers	2–0	2–1		1–1	2–1	3–0	6–0	3–1	2–0	3–1	3–3	2–3	1–2	1–1
Dempo	14–0	1–1	2–0		0–1	2–4	5–2	2–0	4–1	1–0	2–0	2–1	1–3	3–3
East Bengal	6–1	2–1	2–2	3–2		1–0	4–0	3–0	2–1	1–2	1–0	1–0	1–0	3–0
HAL	1–3	1–1	0–3	0–3	1–1		0–4	0–0	1–1	1–0	1–0	1–2	0–1	0–1
Indian Arrows	2–1	0–0	1–2	1–1	1–1	2–1		0–0	5–4	1–1	1–1	0–0	1–3	0–1
JCT	2–0	2–2	1–1	1–2	0–1	0–1	2–0		0–1	1–0	1–0	2–1	0–2	1–0
Mohun Bagan	2–0	0–1	0–0	2–2	1–1	1–2	2–0	2–0		2–0	1–2	0–0	2–2	2–1
Mumbai	2–1	0–0	1–5	0–1	1–1	1–0	1–2	1–1	0–0		1–0	2–0	0–1	2–0
ONGC	1–2	2–2	1–1	0–1	1–0	4–0	1–1	2–1	1–3	2–2		1–1	0–1	1–0
Pune	2–1	1–1	0–1	3–2	2–1	0–1	3–0	4–0	1–1	1–1	1–0		0–1	4–4
Salgaocar	0–1	4–3	4–3	1–3	3–2	3–0	5–0	2–0	1–3	2–3	5–0	0–1		4–0
Viva Kerala	7–1	1–1	0–1	0–2	0–1	1–1	0–1	4–1	2–0	1–0	0–0	1–1	0–3	

Source: Soccerway
Legend: Blue = home team win; Yellow = draw; Red = away team win.

== Top goalscorers ==
Updated on 10 April 2015.

Rank	Scorer	Club	Goals
1	(Nigeria) Ranty Martins	Dempo	28
2	(Nigeria) Odafa Onyeka Okolie	Churchill Brothers	25
3	(Japan) Ryuji Sueoka	Salgaocar	18
4	(Brazil) Beto	Dempo	17
4	(Australia) Tolgay Özbey	East Bengal	17
6	(Ghana) Yusif Yakubu	Salgaocar	15
7	(India) Jeje Lalpekhlua	Indian Arrows	13
7	(Guinea) Mandjou Keita	Pune	11
9	(New Zealand) Kayne Vincent	Churchill Brothers	12
10	(Nigeria) Okorogor Praise	Air India	11
10	(Nigeria) Badmus Babatunde	ONGC	11
12	(Nigeria) Muritala Ali	Mohun Bagan	10
12	(India) Anil Kumar	Chirag United Kerala	10

=== Hat-tricks ===
Player	For	Against	Result	Date
(Nigeria) Odafa Onyeka Okolie	Churchill Brothers	Mumbai	5–1	2010-12-18
(Nigeria) Odafa Onyeka Okolie	Churchill Brothers	Pailan Arrows	6–0	2011-1-3
(Guinea) Mandjou Keita	Pune	JCT	4–0	2011-1-30
(India) Anil Kumar	Chirag United Kerala	Air India	7–1	2011-2-20
(India) Jeje Lalpekhlua	Pailan Arrows	Air India	2–5	2011-3-13
(Australia) Tolgay Özbey	East Bengal	Air India	3–0	2011-4-4
(India) Jeje Lalpekhlua	Pailan Arrows	Mohun Bagan	5–4	2011-5-29
(Nigeria) Muritala Ali	Mohun Bagan	Pailan Arrows	4–5	2011-5-29
(Nigeria) Ranty Martins	Dempo	Air India	14-0	2011-5-30
(Brazil) Beto	Dempo	Air India	14-0	2011-5-30

- (Guinea) Mandjou Keita was the first Hat-trick scored by a Pune player in I-League for their franchise.
- (India) Jeje Lalpekhlua was the first Hat-trick for Pailan Arrows team in I-League.
- (Australia) Tolgay Özbey was the first Australian to score a Hat-trick in I-League.

== Scoring ==
- Most games failed to score in:
- Most goals scored in a match by a single team:Dempo 14–0
- Highest scoring game:Dempo 14–0 Air India
- Widest winning margin:Dempo 14–0 Air India

=== Clean sheets ===
- Most clean sheets: 11 – East Bengal

== See also ==
- 2010 Indian Federation Cup
- List of Indian football transfers 2010-2011
