= C. S. Sabeeth =

Indian footballer (born 1990)

Personal information
- Full name: Chinadorai Sathyan Sabeeth
- Date of birth: 2 December 1990 (age 35)
- Place of birth: Kayyunni, Nilgiris, Tamil Nadu
- Height: 1.78 m (5 ft 10 in)
- Position: Striker

Team information
- Current team: ASOS Rainbow
- Number: 47

Youth career
- 2005–2006: Nilagiri Police
- 2007–2008: Indian Bank

Senior career*
Years	Team	Apps	(Gls)
2009–2011	Chirag United	10	(9)
2011–2012	Indian Arrows	16	(9)
2012–2015	Mohun Bagan	41	(5)
2014	→ Kerala Blasters (loan)	8	(1)
2015–2016	East Bengal	5	(0)
2015	→ Goa (loan)	8	(0)
2016–	Ozone	27	(19)
2018	→ Minerva Punjab (loan)	2	(0)
2021	BASCO FC	0	(0)
2021–	ASOS Rainbow		

International career^{‡}
2008	India U17	5	(1)
2009–2014	India U23	5	(4)
2011–2012	India	2	(0)
- * Club domestic league appearances and goals as of 18:01,14 January 2019 (UTC) ‡ National team caps and goals as of 11:49, 20 March 2015 (UTC)

C. S. Sabeeth is an Indian football player who plays as a striker for ASOS Rainbow in the CFL Premier B. He represents Karnataka football team in the Santosh Trophy.

== Career ==
=== Early career ===
Sabeeth was born in The Nilgiris District of Gudalur, Tamil Nadu. His father, Sathyan C.A., was a football player who played for the Nilagiri Police team—inspiring Sabeeth to become a footballer. Between 2005 and 2006, Sabeeth played for the Nilagiri Police football team as a striker. In 2006, he became the highest scorer in the local league where his team were champions.

He was in the team for the 2008 AFC Youth Championship qualification round held in Iran, playing 5 matches and scoring 1 goal against Pakistan. He received calls to play for the Tamil Nadu U19 and India U19 teams.

=== Chirag United ===
He started his professional football career in Chennai, where he played for the Indian Bank Recreational Club for 2 seasons before joining Chirag United, where he played for 3 years.

In the 2009 I-League 2nd Division, Sabeeth played a crucial part in the promotion of Chirag United, scoring three goals in the final round. The next season, he scored 3 goals for Viva Kerala in the 2009-10 I-League. Sabeeth scored the winning goal against Shillong Lajong, his team winning the game 2–1 to move out of the danger zone.

=== Indian Arrows ===
For the 2011–12 season, Sabeeth signed with the Indian Arrows, a club made up of young Indian talents in the I-League. During the 2011 Indian Federation Cup, Sabeeth scored the second goal for Arrows in the 53rd minute against Mumbai in a 2–1 win. He then scored his first league goal for Arrows against HAL on 2 November 2011. On 24 November 2011, Sabeeth scored another goal against Chirag United. Sabeeth scored the only Indian hat trick in the 2011–12 I-League on 25 April 2012 in the 3–0 rout of Chirag United. He finished as the 11th top scorer, and the top Indian scorer in the 2011-12 I-League. At the end of the 2011–12 season, he was signed by Mohun Bagan.

=== Mohun Bagan ===
Sabeeth signed with Mohun Bagan for the 2012–13 I-League season and was used regularly from the bench during his first season. Sabeeth made more starts in the 2013–14 I-League and made 21 appearances, scoring 4 times. He was loaned out to Kerala Blasters for the 2014 Indian Super League, making 8 appearances and scoring once. Sabeeth was praised for his stamina and work-rate while with the Blasters, with his coach/manager David James calling him the fittest player in the squad.

==== Kerala Blasters (loan) ====
Sabeeth would join Kerala Blasters for the inaugural 2014 Indian Super League on loan.

=== East Bengal ===
Sabeeth signed a permanent deal for East Bengal on 16 June 2015 on a 1-year contract.

==== Goa (loan) ====
In July 2015, it was announced that Sabeeth would join Goa for the 2015 Indian Super League on loan from East Bengal.

=== Ozone ===
Sabeeth signed a permanent deal with Ozone to play in the I-League 2nd Division for the 2016–17 season. He would score twice but could not help his team gain promotion. He would continue with Ozone in the 2nd division for the 2017–18 season and would finish the season as the highest scoring Indian in the division with 9 goals, and only one behind teammate Robert Ribiero, who finished as the division top scorer. After a loan at Minerva Punjab, he would continue with Ozone for the 2018–19 season and would once again finish the season as the highest scoring Indian with 8 goals, two behind Nigerian Princewill Emeka and Ghanaian Phillip Adjah.

==== Minerva Punjab (loan) ====
On 2 September 2018, he joined I-League club Minerva Punjab

== International ==
On 9 March 2011, Sabeeth played his third match and scored his first goal for the Indian U-23 football team against Myanmar U-23 in the 2012 Olympics Pre-Qualifier. After the performance in the match, Sabeeth was called into the India senior squad for the 2012 AFC Challenge Cup qualifiers. On 25 March 2011, Sabeeth made his international debut for India against Turkmenistan.

== Career statistics ==
=== Club ===
Statistics accurate as of 20 December 2015

Club	Season	League			Cup		Continental		Total	
Club	Season	Division	Apps	Goals	Apps	Goals	Apps	Goals	Apps	Goals
Chirag United	2009	I-League 2nd Division	3	3	0	0	–	–	3	3
Chirag United	2009–10	I-League	3	3	3	0	–	–	6	3
Chirag United	2010–11	I-League	4	3	3	2	–	–	7	5
Indian Arrows	2011–12	I-League	16	9	3	1	0	0	19	10
Mohun Bagan	2012–13	I-League	17	1	3	1	0	0	20	2
Mohun Bagan	2013–14	I-League	21	4	2	0	4	3	27	3
Mohun Bagan	2014–15	I-League	3	0	4	0	3	1	10	1
Kerala Blasters (loan)	2014	Indian Super League	8	1	–	–	–	–	8	1
East Bengal	2015–16	I-League	0	0	0	0	0	0	0	0
Goa (loan)	2015	Indian Super League	8	0	–	–	–	–	8	0
Ozone	2016–17	I-League 2nd Division	6	2	0	0	–	–	6	2
Ozone	2017–18	I-League 2nd Division	11	9	0	0	–	–	11	9
Ozone	2018–19	I-League 2nd Division	12	8	0	0	–	–	12	8
Career total			112	43	18	4	7	4	137	51

=== National team statistics ===
Statistics accurate as of 20 March 2015

India national team
Year	Apps	Goals
2011	1	0
2012	1	0
Total	2	0
