= Warundeep Singh =

Indian footballer

Personal information
- Full name: Warundeep Singh
- Date of birth: 20 September 1986 (age 40)
- Place of birth: Punjab, India
- Height: 1.83 m (6 ft 0 in)
- Position: Center back

Youth career
- 2002–2006: TFA

Senior career*
Years	Team	Apps	(Gls)
2010–2011	Churchill Brothers	19	(1)
2011	Sporting Clube de Goa	12	(0)
2012–2013	Mohun Bagan		
2012–2013	Mohammedan		
2015	JCT FC		

International career
2003–2004	India U19		
2006–2008	India U23		
- * Club domestic league appearances and goals

Warundeep Singh is an Indian football player who plays as defender.

== Career ==
=== Early career ===
Warundeep was born in Jalandhar and he started playing football in the year 1999. He was playing football locally in his area. He joined TFA in 2002 and passed out in 2006.

=== Churchill Brothers ===
He joined Churchill Brothers in 2006 and played there for 5 years. He was part of the team which won the Durand Cup in 2007, where they defeated Mahindra United in the final by 1–0. He also played in the 2009 IFA Shield final where they defeated Mohun Bagan to clinch the title. He was also part of the team which won the 2008-09 I-League. He was part of the team in 1st leg though in return leg he got injured.

=== Sporting Clube de Goa ===
In July 2011 Singh signed for recently promoted team Sporting Clube de Goa who also plays in the I-League.

=== Mohun Bagan ===
He signed for Kolkata giant Mohun Bagan on 20 June 2012.

== International ==
While Warundeep was in TFA, he got chance in the U-19 Indian team, Which played a tournament held in Jamshedpur. In the next year, he was part of the U-19 Indian team that played in a tournament in Thailand.

Then for the U-23 Indian team, where India played in the 2006 South Asian Games where India finished runners up, losing to Pakistan in the final. He also played in the Olympic Qualifiers.

He has been called for India national football team camp a few times.

== Honours ==
India U20

- South Asian Games Silver medal: 2004
