= Manish Maithani =

Indian footballer

Personal information
- Full name: Manish Maithani
- Date of birth: 1 April 1989 (age 37)
- Place of birth: Dehradun, India
- Height: 1.70 m (5 ft 7 in)
- Position: Central midfielder

Team information
- Current team: DESA FC

Youth career
- 2007: Amity United FC
- 2007: Hindustan FC
- 2007–2009: Indian National Youth Teams

Senior career*
Years	Team	Apps	(Gls)
2009–2013	Mohun Bagan	58	(6)
2013–2014	Mohammedan	18	(0)
2014–2016	FC Pune City	10	(0)
2015	→ Vitoria Guimarães B (loan)	0	(0)
2017–2018	Southern Samity	6	(0)
2022–	DESA FC	3	(1)

International career^{‡}
2009–2010	India U23	6	(1)
2012	India	1	(0)

Managerial career
- 2019 –: DESA FC (player-manager)
- * Club domestic league appearances and goals as of 07:02, 4 February 2015 (UTC) ‡ National team caps and goals as of 07:02, 4 February 2015 (UTC)

Manish Maithani is an Indian football player who played as a central midfielder for Southern Samity and currently coaches a local club in Dehradun DESA FC.

== Club career ==
=== Mohun Bagan ===
After two seasons playing as a youth with Indian National Youth Teams Maithani signed for Mohun Bagan A.C. in 2009. On 28 March, he had scored the equalizer against Shillong Lajong F.C., after coming in as a substitute.

=== Mohammedan (loan) ===
After the 2012–13 season ended, Maithani signed with IMG-Reliance to join their Indian Super League but due to objection from the I-League clubs in which they said they would not sign any players who joined the ISL it meant that Maithani would be without a club for a long period of time. Then, on 30 October 2013, it was announced that Mohammedan S.C. had broken that barrier when they signed Maithani on loan.

Maithani made his debut for Mohammedan in the I-League on 24 October 2013 United S.C. at the Salt Lake Stadium; in which he came on as a substitute for Jerry Zirsanga in the 73rd minute as Mohammedan drew the match 0–0.

=== FC Pune City ===
Mathani was drafted in by Indian Super League side FC Pune City for the 2014 Indian Super League.He played 2 matches in the 2014 Indian Super League.The next year he played 8 matches for the team.

=== Vitória de Guimarães B ===
Mathani was loaned out to 2nd division side Vitória de Guimarães B in Portugal from FC Pune City for 5 months.

=== Doon Elite Soccer Academy (DESA) ===
Maithani started playing and coaching simultaneously, starting a local football academy. He has been coaching a talejnt in his academy with national players like Rishi Upadhyay and Anubhav Rawat who were recently selected in the Uttrakhand squad for Santosh Trophy 2021.

=== 2022–23 Season (DESA FC) ===
DESA FC started the season in Dehradun District Soccer League winning all the games of Group Stage and advancing to the league stages comfortably.

== International career ==
Manish made his senior international debut against Azerbaijan for India on 27 February 2012 in their 3–0 defeat.

== Honours ==
India U23

- SAFF Championship: 2009

== See also ==
- List of Indian football players in foreign leagues
