= Manish Bhargav =

Indian footballer

Personal information
- Date of birth: 22 February 1994 (age 32)
- Place of birth: Punjab, India
- Height: 1.68 m (5 ft 6 in)
- Position: Midfielder

Team information
- Current team: Mohun Bagan
- Number: 34

Youth career
- 2010–2012: Mohun Bagan

Senior career*
Years	Team	Apps	(Gls)
2011–2018	Mohun Bagan	63	(20)
2014–2018	→ Delhi Dynamos FC (loan)	3	(2)

International career^{‡}
2013–2018	India U23	3	(3)
- * Club domestic league appearances and goals as of 09:41, 23 March 2015 (UTC) ‡ National team caps and goals as of 09:39, 1 April 2015 (UTC)

Manish Bhargav (born 22 February 1994) is an Indian footballer who plays as a midfielder for Mohun Bagan in the I-League.

== Career ==
=== Mohun Bagan ===
After practice one years in the Mohun Bagan Academy, Manish signed on professional terms with Mohun Bagan on 13 November 2011. He then made his debut for Bagan on 22 January 2012 against Prayag United, staying on the pitch till the 41st minute when he was substituted off by Gouranga Dutta.

== International ==
Bhargav made his Indian U23 debut against Uzbekistan U23 on 27 March 2015 in a 2016 AFC U-23 qualifier in the Bangabandhu National Stadium in Bangladesh.

== Career statistics ==
=== Club ===
As of 23 March 2015

Club	Season	League			Cup			AFC			Total
Club	Season	Apps	Goals	Apps	Goals	Apps	Goals	Apps	Goals	Apps	Goals
Mohun Bagan	2011–12	5	1	0	0	0	0	—	—	5	1
Mohun Bagan	2012–13	17	3	0	0	0	0	—	—	17	3
Mohun Bagan	2013–14	18	4	0	-|-|15	4					
Mohun Bagan	2014–15	14	3	0	0	0	0	6	3		
Delhi Dynamos FC (loan)	2014	3	2	—	—	—	—	—	—	3	2
Career total		64	14	0	0	0	0	0	0	46	14
