= Jewel Raja =

Indian footballer (born 1990)

Personal information
- Full name: Jewel Raja Shaikh
- Date of birth: 19 January 1990 (age 36)
- Place of birth: Budge Budge, West Bengal, India
- Height: 1.72 m (5 ft 7 1/2 in)
- Position: Central midfielder

Team information
- Current team: South United

Youth career
- Sport Authority of India
- 2007–2008: ONGC

Senior career*
Years	Team	Apps	(Gls)
2008–2010	Dempo		
2010–2011	Indian Arrows	5	(1)
2011–2013	Mohun Bagan	34	(5)
2013–2016	Dempo	31	(0)
2014	→ Goa (loan)	9	(1)
2015–2016	→ Atlético de Kolkata (loan)	14	(0)
2017	Minerva Punjab	3	(0)
2017–2018	Pune City	6	(0)
2018	Mohammedan		
2018–	South United		

International career^{‡}
2009–2012	India U23		
2011–2013	India	28	(3)
- * Club domestic league appearances and goals as of 16:50, 27 November 2018 (UTC) ‡ National team caps and goals as of 9 September 2013

Jewel Raja Shaikh (Bengali: জুয়েল রাজা শেখ; born 19 January 1990) is an Indian professional footballer who plays as a central midfielder for South United in the I-League 2nd Division.

== Career ==
=== Early career ===
Born in Budge Budge, Kolkata, Jewel though had a keen interest in cricket and wanted to become a cricketer when he was younger but chose to play football professionally. Initially playing as a winger for his youth teams, primarily on the right, he was encouraged to become a central midfielder by his father. Jewel joined the Pujali Athletic Club as a youngster and later joined the Sports Authority of India's eastern center in Kolkata, and then was selected to be a part of IFA's academy at Haldia.

=== ONGC ===
He then appeared for the Bengal under-19 football team and then India U19s despite only being 16 and soon joined ONGC in the I-League in 2007 but didn't make any appearance for the Mumbai based club as he was heavily involved on national duty for the majority of his time there.

=== Dempo ===
Jewel continued his progress with age group teams of India at national level and was offered a contract by Dempo of I-League in 2008 but struggled for game time in a talented Dempo side and only made his I-League debut in a substitute appearance against Churchill Brothers.

=== Pailan Arrows ===
Jewel was signed up by Pailan Arrows for the 2010–11 season but again was more involved with the national team than with his club side.

=== Mohun Bagan ===
Jewel signed for Mohun Bagan on 25 July 2011 and on 23 October 2011, registered his first assist for the Mariners against his former club Pailan Arrows. He then scored his first goal for Bagan in a 5–1 victory over Mumbai on 6 November 2011. Jewel scored against ONGC from a Tolgay Özbey pass on 63rd minute in a 3–1 win for his team

=== Dempo ===
On 30 May 2013, Jewel rejoined Dempo after spending two seasons with Mohun Bagan. He played his first match since his return in the I-League on 22 September 2013 against Shillong Lajong at the Duler Stadium, playing 65 minutes before being replaced by Joy Ferrao as Dempo lost the match 0–3.

Jewel represented FC Goa during the 2014 Indian Super League season and made 9 appearances and scoring once.

=== Atlético de Kolkata ===
In July 2015 Jewel was drafted to play for Atlético de Kolkata in the 2015 Indian Super League.

== International ==
Jewel scored in his first goal for the Indian U23s against Singapore U23 at the 2010 Asian Games. On 23 February 2011, he played his second game against Myanmar.

He made his senior team debut and scored his first goal for India in a 3–0 win over Chinese Taipei on 21 March 2011, after coming on as a substitute.

== Career statistics ==
=== Club ===
Statistics accurate as of 20 November 2015

Club	Season	League			Federation Cup		Durand Cup		AFC		Total	
Club	Season	Division	Apps	Goals	Apps	Goals	Apps	Goals	Apps	Goals	Apps	Goals
Pailan Arrows	2010–11	I-League	5	1	0	0	0	0	—	—	5	1
Mohun Bagan	2011–12	I-League	16	4	0	0	0	0	—	—	16	4
Mohun Bagan	2012–13	I-League	18	1	0	0	0	0	—	—	18	1
Dempo	2013–14	I-League	18	0	0	0	0	0	—	—	18	0
FC Goa (loan)	2014	Indian Super League	9	1	—	—	—	—	—	—	9	1
Dempo	2014–15	I-League	13	0	0	0	0	0	—	—	13	0
Atletico de Kolkata	2015	Indian Super League	0	—	—	—	—	—	—	6	0	
Career total			85	7	0	0	0	0	0	0	85	7

=== International Goals ===
Goal	Date	Venue	Opponent	Score	Result	Competition
1	21 March 2011	Petaling Jaya Stadium, Petaling Jaya, Malaysia	Chinese Taipei	3–0	3–0	2012 AFC Challenge Cup
2	2 March 2013	Thuwunna Stadium, Yangon, Myanmar	Chinese Taipei	1–0	2–1	2014 AFC Challenge Cup qualifier
3	4 March 2013	Thuwunna Stadium, Yangon, Myanmar	Guam	3–0	4–0	2014 AFC Challenge Cup qualifier

== Honours ==
India

- SAFF Championship: 2011; runner-up: 2013
- Nehru Cup: 2012

India U23

- SAFF Championship: 2009
