= Quinton Jacobs =

Namibian footballer (born 1979)

Personal information
- Full name: Quinton Norman Jacobs
- Date of birth: 21 January 1979 (age 47)
- Place of birth: Windhoek, South West Africa
- Height: 1.80 m (5 ft 11 in)
- Position: Midfielder

Senior career*
| Years | Team | Apps | (Gls) |
| 1997–1999 | Black Africa | 47 | (0) |
| 1999–2000 | Partick Thistle | 27 | (3) |
| 2000–2001 | Duisburg | 0 | (0) |
| 2001–2003 | Black Leopards | 10 | (0) |
| 2003–2004 | Civics | 20 | (0) |
| 2004–2005 | Ramblers | 9 | (0) |
| 2005–2006 | Ajax Cape Town | 6 | (1) |
| 2006–2007 | Bryne | 15 | (1) |
| 2008 | Ramblers | 17 | (0) |
| 2009–2010 | African Stars | 5 | (1) |
| 2010 | → Jabal Al Mukaber (loan) | 7 | (0) |
| 2011–2012 | United Sikkim | 23 | (16) |
| 2012 | Salgaocar | 9 | (0) |
| 2013 | Mohun Bagan | 10 | (0) |

International career
| 1998– | Namibia | 28 | (4) |
Medal record
Men's football
Representing Namibia
COSAFA Cup
| Runner-up | 1999 Southern Africa |
- * Club domestic league appearances and goals

Quinton Norman Jacobs (born 21 January 1979) is a Namibian former footballer who played as a midfielder.

== Career ==
Born in Windhoek, Namibia, Jacobs began his football career with local club Black Africa, playing for them from 1997 to 1999. In late 1998, he spent a trial period with Manchester United, playing in a friendly for the club's reserve team against a Major League Soccer Under-21s side.

After leaving Black Africa in 1999, he had a brief spell with Partick Thistle in the Scottish Division Two, after turning down offers from Ajax and Werder Bremen.

He left Partick in 2000 and spent a year with German side Duisburg, but did not make a single appearance before joining South African side Black Leopards in 2001. In 2003, he moved back to Namibia to play for Civics Windhoek. He spent a year there and another year with Ramblers before returning to South Africa to play for Ajax Cape Town in 2005. In 2006, Jacobs got another chance in European football, joining Norway's Bryne, but after just one goal in 15 appearances, he rejoined Ramblers.

In 2009, he placed for African Stars F.C. in Namibia and joined Palestinian club Jabal Al Mukaber early in 2010.

=== United Sikkim ===
He played for the United Sikkim F.C. in the 2012 I-League 2nd Division. On 15 March 2012 he scored a brace which helped his side win 3–2 against Kalighat Milan Sangha in Siliguri. He had scored 16 goals in 23 matches in the 2nd Division for the Gangtok-based club.

=== Salgaocar ===
On 6 May 2012 Jacobs signed with former Indian I-League champions Salgaocar.

=== Mohun Bagan ===
In January 2013, the century-old Kolkata-based club Mohun Bagan A.C. signed this Namibian midfielder as a replacement to the underperforming Stanley Okoroigwe. On 28th Match, he scored his first I-League goal for the club against Pailan Arrows in a 2–0 win at Kalyani. He also won the Man of the Match for the effort.

== International career ==
He is a member of the Namibia national football team.

== Coaching career ==
He is the current Head Coach of Mariental based club Mariental Sports Club, From 2020 to current. League: Namibian Football Association Southern Stream 1st Division

== Honours ==
Namibia

- COSAFA Cup: Runner-up, 1999
