= Anil Kumar (footballer) =

Indian footballer

Personal information
- Date of birth: 14 September 1986 (age 40)
- Place of birth: India
- Height: 1.78 m (5 ft 10 in)
- Position: Forward

Senior career*
Years	Team	Apps	(Gls)
2007	Viva Kerala		
2009	Salgaocar		
2009–2010	Kerala State Electricity Board		
2010–2011	Viva Kerala	18	(10)
2011–2012	Dempo	0	(0)
2011–2012	→ Chirag United Kerala (loan)	11	(3)
2012–2013	Mohun Bagan	0	(0)
- * Club domestic league appearances and goals

Anil Kumar (born 14 September 1986) is a former Indian footballer who played as a forward.

== Career ==
=== Viva Kerala ===
After playing for Viva Kerala and Salgaocar in the I-League 2nd Division, Kumar decided to move back to Kerala in order to keep his job at the Kerala State Electricity Board, where he also played for there football team in various amateur Kerala state tournaments. After spending two years at the Electricity Board, Kumar re-signed for Viva Kerala for the 2011–12 I-League season in which he ended the season as the top scorer among all Indian players with 11 goals.

=== Dempo ===
After Kumar's season at Viva Kerala he signed for two time I-League champions Dempo.

=== Loan to Chirag United Kerala ===
On 7 November 2011 Kumar, returned to Chirag United Kerala (formerly Viva Kerala) on loan from Dempo for one season after he was reported to be unhappy about playing time. Kumar then made his third debut for the club on 19 November 2011 against Sporting Clube de Goa in which Chirag lost 0–2. Kumar then scored his first goal for Chirag United Kerala on 3 December 2011 against defending champions Salgaocar in which the match ended 1–1. He then scored his second goal for the club that season against Churchill Brothers on 14 December 2011 in which Chirag lost 1–2. He then scored his third goal for the club on 31 January 2012 against Mohun Bagan in a match that Chirag lost 1–3.

=== Mohun Bagan ===
After his stint with Dempo, Kumar signed for I-League side Mohun Bagan. After the season ended Kumar left the club.

== Career statistics ==
=== Club ===
Statistics accurate as of 22 April 2014

Club	Season	League			Cup			AFC			Total		
Club	Season	Apps	Goals	Assists	Apps	Goals	Assists	Apps	Goals	Assists	Apps	Goals	Assists
Viva Kerala	2010–11	18	11	0	0	0	0	—	—	—	18	11	0
Dempo	2011–12	0	0	0	0	0	0	0	0	0	0	0	0
Chirag United Kerala (loan)	2011–12	11	3	0	0	0	0	—	—	—	11	3	0
Career total		29	14	0	0	0	0	0	0	0	29	14	0
