= Hudson Lima =

Brazilian footballer (born 1984)

Personal information
- Full name: Hudson Lima Silva
- Date of birth: 8 May 1984 (age 42)
- Place of birth: São Bento do Una – PE Brazil
- Position: Striker

Youth career
- 1995–2002: Palmeiras
- 2002–2004: Fluminense Football Club

Senior career*
Years	Team	Apps	(Gls)
2005–2007	CF Rio de Janeiro		
2008	Portuguesa Santista		
2009	Três Passos		
2010	Paysandu		
2011	América Mineiro		
2011–2012	Mohun Bagan		
2012–2013	Bhawanipore		
- * Club domestic league appearances and goals

Hudson Lima Silva (born 8 May 1984) is a Brazilian former professional footballer who played as a forward.

== Career ==
Hudson played previously with CF Rio de Janeiro, Associação Atlética Portuguesa Santista, Três Passos Atlético Clube, União Central Futebol Clube, Paysandu Sport Club, América Mineiro in Brazil and Indian side Mohun Bagan. He also played for Bhawanipore.
