= Kailash Patil =

Indian footballer (born 1987)

Personal information
- Date of birth: 16 September 1987 (age 39)
- Place of birth: Kolhapur, India
- Height: 1.79 m (5 ft 10 in)
- Position: Striker

Team information
- Current team: ONGC FC

Senior career*
Years	Team	Apps	(Gls)
2005–2009	Rashtriya Chemicals & Fertilizers		
2009–2010	Air India FC		
2010–present	ONGC FC		
- * Club domestic league appearances and goals

Kailash Patil is Indian professional football player who last played for I-League club ONGC FC.

== Career ==
He scored 2 goals for ONGC F.C. against Hindustan Aeronautics Limited S.C. on 9 April 2011. He previously played for Air India FC. He Scored 2 more goals against Mohun Bagan AC on 24 April 2011, to give ONGC win.

He was playing local tournaments, when Rashtriya Chemicals and Fertilizers (RCF) coach Kishor Khedkar spotted him and brought him to Mumbai. He had a successful 2005 season with RCF. He was injured for most of 2006 and returned to RCF at the end of the next year with a slightly better salary. Success in the local Mumbai District Football Association's league got him the best player's award, and earned him Air India FC’s attention. He played for it for the first time in the 2009 season.

== Career statistics ==
=== Club ===
Statistics accurate as of 11 May 2013

Club	Season	League		Federation Cup		Durand Cup		AFC		Total	
Club	Season	Apps	Goals	Apps	Goals	Apps	Goals	Apps	Goals	Apps	Goals
ONGC	2012-13	18	0	0	0	0	0	—	—	18	0
Career total		18	0	0	0	0	0	0	0	18	0
