= Echezona Anyichie =

Nigerian footballer (born 1990)

Personal information
- Full name: Celestine Echezona Anyichie
- Date of birth: 14 May 1990 (age 36)
- Place of birth: Lagos, Nigeria
- Height: 1.85 m (6 ft 1 in)
- Position: Centre-back

Team information
- Current team: George Telegraph

Senior career*
Years	Team	Apps	(Gls)
2007–2008	AC Oulu		
2008–2010	Dolphin		
2010–2011	Samutsongkhram		
2011–2012	Southern Samity	6	(0)
2012–2014	Mohun Bagan	42	(0)
2014–2017	Royal Wahingdoh	0	(0)
2017	Chennai City	17	(0)
2018	Mohammedan	9	(1)
2018	George Telegraph	15	(2)
2018–2019	Chhinga Veng	10	(1)
2019–2020	George Telegraph	26	(3)
2021–2022	Bhawanipore	18	(2)
2023–	Bodoland FC	1	(0)

International career
2003	Nigeria U-17	6	(0)
2005–2006	Nigeria U-20	2	(0)
- * Club domestic league appearances and goals as of 16:22, 13 May 2018 (UTC)

Celestine Echezona Anyichie (born 14 May 1990) is a Nigerian professional footballer who last played as a defender for George Telegraph in the Calcutta Football League.

== Club career ==
=== Finland ===
Eche had a trial in Finland for top tier Finnish club HJK Helsinki, but failed to earn a contract. He then signed for another Veikkausliiga side AC Oulu.

=== Nigeria ===
After the stint in Finland he returned to Nigeria to play for Dolphins F.C. in the Nigeria Premier League.

=== Thailand ===
He had a brief spell in Thailand Premier League for Samut Songkhram F.C.

=== India ===
Southern Samity signed Echezona for the 2012 I-League 2nd Division. Though his team failed to qualify his performance was appreciated, and thus Mohun Bagan AC signed him up on a 1-year contract for 2012–13 I-League. He has also played for Chennai City during the 2016–17 I-League Season. In 2020–21, he appeared with Calcutta Football League club Bhawanipore.

== International career ==
Anyichie has represented Nigeria in the 2003 FIFA U-17 World Championship. He started all the matches for his country in the group stages and played alongside the likes of Mikel John Obi and Chinedu Obasi.
