= Denson Devadas =

Indian footballer (born 1982)

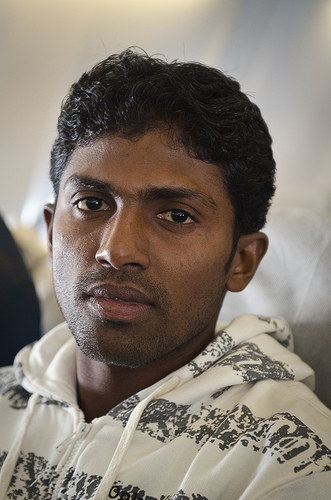
- MR. DENSON DEVADAS

Personal information
- Full name: Denson Devadas
- Date of birth: 20 December 1982 (age 43)
- Place of birth: Kannur, Kerala, India
- Height: 1.76 m (5 ft 9 1/2 in)
- Position: Central midfielder

Senior career*
Years	Team	Apps	(Gls)
2004–2006	Viva Kerala		
2007–2011	Chirag United		(4)
2012–2014	Mohun Bagan	47	(2)
2014	Chennaiyin	15	(0)
2015	Mohun Bagan	13	(1)
2015	Goa	8	(0)
2016	Sporting Goa	8	(0)
2016	Delhi Dynamos	0	(0)
2017	Chennai City FC	12	(0)

International career
1	2012 -2013		
- * Club domestic league appearances and goals as of 2 January 2017

Denson Devadas (born 20 December 1982) is a former Indian professional footballer who played as a central midfielder.

== Career ==
=== Early career ===
He was born in Burnacherry (Burnshire), Kannur, Kerala. His grandfather was a hockey player who played in the Senior National Championship. His father, Devadas Anthony, was a footballer who played for the Services football team in the Santosh Trophy.

He started playing football when he was studying at the Army School, in Kannur. The school was famous for sports and he was the Captain of his school team. After passing out from school, he joined Srinarayana College, Kannur where he used to play for his college team. He was a striker both while in school and college. Later on, he also was the Captain of the university team.

In the year 2004, Viva Kerala selected him after conducting a trial. He got selected as a striker. Chathuni Sir was the Coach of Viva Kerala at that time. He stayed in Viva Kerala till 2006.

It was Chathuni Sir who brought him to the midfielder. Viva Kerala was playing a friendly match against the Kerala football team and one of his team midfielders got injured. The coach asked him to play in midfield. Seeing his performance, he asked him to continue playing as the defensive medio. His team became the State League Champions that year.

Viva Kerala qualified for the 2006-07 Indian National Football League. They defeated United SC 2–0. During that tournament, he got offers from Salgaocar, ONGC, and United SC. After consulting Chathuni Sir, he moved to Kolkata to play for United Sports. United Sports was in the 2nd Division in the year 2007 and qualified for the I-League. He stayed in United Sports till 2011.

In 2010, playing for West Bengal in the Santosh Trophy, he scored a brace in the final against Punjab leading West Bengal to their 30th title.

=== Mohun Bagan ===
Denson joined Mohun Bagan in 2013. In his first season, he played 25 matches and scored 2 goals. Denson left Mohun Bagan at the end of the 2013-2014 I League. However, he was signed back by Mohun Bagan for the 2014–15 season, after he played for Chennaiyin F.C. in the Indian Super League.

=== FC Goa ===
In July 2015 it was announced that Denson would join FC Goa for the 2015 Indian Super League.

== Personal life ==
Denson's favourite football club is Manchester City and his favourite football-playing nation is Argentina national football team. His favorite players are Zinedine Zidane, Basudev Mondal, and Climax Lawrence. He is married to Dr. Anisha Gopal from Wayanad and the couple have a son, Dhruvith Denson.

== Honours ==
Individual

- "Karuna Sankar Bhattacharya" Memorial Award for best footballer: 2013
