= Shaiju Mon =

Indian footballer (born 1991)

Personal information
- Full name: Shaiju Mon
- Date of birth: 16 May 1991 (age 35)
- Place of birth: Thiruvananthapuram, Kerala, India
- Height: 1.75 m (5 ft 9 in)
- Position: Midfielder

Team information
- Current team: SBI Kerala FC
- Number: 8

Youth career
- 2008: Sree Kerala Varma College
- 2009: Chandni

Senior career*
Years	Team	Apps	(Gls)
2010–2011	Chirag United Kerala	4	(0)
2012–2013	Pailan Arrows	18	(1)
2013–present	Mohun Bagan	2	(0)

International career
2012–	India U23	2	(0)
- * Club domestic league appearances and goals as of 27 April 2014

Shaiju Mon (born 16 May 1991) is an Indian professional football player who plays for Mohun Bagan in the I-League.

== Early career ==
Mon was born in Thiruvananthapuram, Kerala. Being the first footballer in his family, he got selected in his school team (MEC, Hosur) when he was studying in Class 8. Later, when he was in the 12th Standard, he played for the coastal team of his home town.

After seeing his performance in his college team, he got chance to play for a 2nd Division team of Kerala, SKVC in the year 2008.

While playing for Chandni FC in the 2009–10 season, he represented that club in the 2010 I-League 2nd Division. He scored a goal against Eagles F.C., with the match ending in a 1–1 draw. He was also adjudged Man of the Match in that game.

=== Chirag United Kerala ===
In 2010 summer Shaiju signed for Chirag United Club Kerala in 2011–12 I-League.

=== Pailan Arrows ===
Shaiju signed for pailan arrows in June 2012 for 2012–13 I-League. He made his debut for the club on 25 August 2012 during the 2012 Durand Cup against Delhi United in which Pailan drew 2–2.

On 24 March 2013, he scored against Mohun Bagan A.C.

=== Mohun Bagan ===
On 29 October 2013 it was confirmed that Shaiju Mon has signed for Mohun Bagan. He made his debut in the I-League on 6 November 2013 against Shillong Lajong F.C. at the Jawaharlal Nehru Stadium, Shillong in which he came on as a substitute for Zakeer Mundampara in the 86th minute as Mohun Bagan drew the match 1-1.

== International ==
Mon made his debut for the India U23 team on 23 June 2012 against Lebanon during the qualifying round for the 2013 AFC U-22 Asian Cup.

== Career statistics ==
=== Club ===
As of 27 April 2014

Club	Season	League		Federation Cup		Durand Cup		AFC		Total	
Club	Season	Apps	Goals	Apps	Goals	Apps	Goals	Apps	Goals	Apps	Goals
Chirag United Kerala	2011–12	4	0	0	0	0	0	—	—	4	0
Pailan Arrows	2012–13	18	1	0	0	1	0	—	—	19	1
Mohun Bagan	2013-14	2	0	0	0	0	0	-	-	2	0
Career total		24	1	0	0	1	0	0	0	25	1
