= Kayne Vincent =

New Zealand footballer (born 1988)

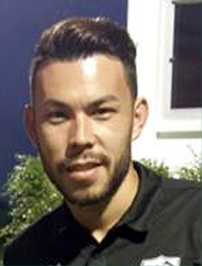
- Vincent with Air Force United in 2017

Personal information
- Full name: Kayne Vincent
- Date of birth: 29 October 1988 (age 38)
- Place of birth: Auckland, New Zealand
- Height: 1.84 m (6 ft 0 in)
- Position: Forward

Team information
- Current team: Western Springs
- Number: 9

Youth career
- 1998–2001: Three Kings United
- 2001–2002: Metro F.C.
- 2003–2006: Mount Wellington

Senior career*
Years	Team	Apps	(Gls)
2007	Cerezo Osaka	4	(0)
2007–2008	Gainare Tottori	8	(2)
2008–2009	Waitakere United	8	(4)
2009–2010	Mumbai	12	(2)
2010–2011	Churchill Brothers	14	(12)
2011–2013	Prayag United	37	(22)
2013	FC Gifu	6	(0)
2014	Songkhla United	33	(12)
2015	Buriram United	3	(0)
2015	→ Port (loan)	6	(1)
2016	Perlis FA	11	(7)
2017–2018	Air Force United	49	(26)
2018	→ Kasetsart (loan)	14	(7)
2019	MOF Customs United	29	(12)
2020	Bangkok	12	(6)
2021	Auckland City	4	(80)
2021–	Western Springs	10	(6)
Total		239	(107)

International career^{‡}
2006–2007	New Zealand U-20	5	(0)
2014	New Zealand	1	(0)
- * Club domestic league appearances and goals as of 14 June 2021 ‡ National team caps and goals as of 18 November 2014

Kayne Vincent (born 29 October 1988) is a New Zealand professional footballer who currently plays as a forward for Western Springs in the Northern League.

Born in Auckland, he played football in Japan, New Zealand, India, Australia, Thailand and Malaysia. He is one of the foreign players who received the most attention in 2016 Malaysia Premier League. He was born to a Japanese mother and a Kiwi father.

== Club career ==
=== Cerezo Osaka & Gainare Tottori ===
Vincent began his professional career for Cerezo Osaka of the J2 League. After playing for Cerezo Osaka in 2007, Vincent transferred to Gainare Tottori for the 2007/08 season. There, Vincent appeared in eight matches, scoring in two of them before getting injured for three months. After his second season in Japan, Vincent transferred to Waitakere United of the ASB Premiership.

=== Waitakere United ===
In December 2008, Vincent played in Waitakere United's 1–2 loss against Adelaide United in the 2008 FIFA Club World Cup in Tokyo, Japan. Vincent also scored in a 2–1 loss against the Kuwait national team.

=== Waitakere City F.C. & Mumbai FC ===
For Waitakere City F.C. in the Lotto Sport Italia NRFL Premier, Vincent scored 20 goals in 15 games, before signing a 1-year deal for Mumbai FC for the 2009–10 I-League season. He Scored only 2 goals for the team but had an impressive 11 assists to his name from 12 games. After finishing his 1-year contract with the club he later on rejected a contract extension from Mumbai FC for the 2010–11 I-League season.

=== Churchill Brothers SC ===
After Mumbai FC he signed a contract with Churchill Brothers SC for the 2010–11 I-League season. He scored 12 goals and 4 assists in 15 matches.

=== Melbourne Knights ===
On 1 June 2011 Vincent signed with VPL club Melbourne Knights on a short-term deal during the i-League off season. At his time with the Knights he scored an impressive 7 goals in 8 matches.

=== Prayag United ===
After his stint with the Melbourne Knights Vincent signed for I-League club Prayag United S.C. for the 2011–12 season. He played in Prayag's first tournament of the season during the 2011 Indian Federation Cup where he scored one goal in three appearances. In October 2011 Prayag United came runners up in the Durand Cup losing to Churchill Brothers SC in the final on Penalties. In the I-League season, Vincent managed to score 11 goals in 18 games for Prayag United. Including the 92nd min winner against city rivals East Bengal where he ran the length of the pitch in injury time. It is believed that Vincent played this and a number of games before with a stress fracture in his heel but played as the team already had a number of injured players. He returned to the field 6 weeks later and scored the winning goal against Botafogo FC of Brazil in the 116th minute in the IFA Shield semi-final, Prayag won 1–0. At the end of season he re-signed for Prayag United for the upcoming 2012–2013 season.

=== FC Gifu ===
On 17 July 2013, Vincent signed for J2 League club FC Gifu, closing the Chapter on his career in India.

=== Songkhla United ===
Vincent signed a 1-year contract for Thai Premier League club Songkhla United for the 2014 season, he managed 12 League goals in 31 appearances and 1 Cup goal in 1 Cup appearance. impressing many clubs around the country, Vincent went on to sign a contract with Thai Champions and Asian Champions League Club Buriram United for the 2015 season.

=== Buriram United and Port F.C. ===
Vincent wore the no.9 Jersey at Thai League Champion side Buriram United who competed in the 2015 Asian Champioms League. However, he just played a few games and loaned to Port F.C.

=== Perlis FA ===
Kayne Vincent played in Malaysia 2nd division club, Perlis FA. He showed impressive gameplay in 2016 pre-season matches. Vincent scored 7 goals in 10 matches and was the club's top scorer. After the club couldn't pay his wages due to financial difficulty, Vincent returned to Thailand, where he signed for T2 side, Air Force Central FC, who were looking for promotion for the past 3 seasons.

=== Air Force Central FC ===
Vincent signed a 2-year contract with Air Force FC, despite a few offers from T1, Vincent was focused on promotion and stated that was his challenge. An injury 3 games into the season saw Vincent sidelined for 9 matches which saw the team drop from 1st to 8th. After Vincent's return to the team, he helped the club set a record of 11 straight victories putting them back up to 1st place, scoring 11 goals after his return. Air Force Central FC have now gained promotion to T1 next season with 3 games remaining.

=== Auckland City FC ===
Vincent returned home to New Zealand and joined up with Auckland City FC in the ISPS Handa Men's Premiership in January 2021 making his debut for the club as a substitute in their 4–0 win over Hawke's Bay United in Napier on 31 January 2021, providing an assist for Yousif Al-Kalisy's goal.

=== Western Springs AFC ===
On 5 April 2021, Vincent played for Western Springs AFC in the Northern League and scored 2 goals in his debut.

== International career ==
Vincent has also played for the New Zealand under-20 national team. On 6 November 2014, he earned his debut call up to the national team to face China and Thailand in friendlies.

== Honours ==
Prayag United

- IFA Shield: 2013
