= Aiborlang Khongjee =

Indian footballer

Personal information
- Full name: Aiborlang Khongjee
- Date of birth: 9 December 1987 (age 38)
- Place of birth: Lyngkhat, Meghalaya, India
- Height: 1.80 m (5 ft 11 in)
- Position: Defender

Team information
- Current team: Rangdajied United FC (head coach)

Youth career
- Sports Authority of India

Senior career*
Years	Team	Apps	(Gls)
2006–2007	Shillong Lajong	24	(2)
2007-2008	East Bengal	24	(4)
2008–2012	Shillong Lajong	108	(12)
2012–2014	Mohun Bagan	40	(2)
2014–2016	Shillong Lajong	30	(2)
2014	→ NorthEast United (loan)	16	(2)
2015	→ NorthEast United (loan)	8	(4)
2016–2018	Mumbai City	28	(4)
2018–2019	ATK	18	(0)

International career
2006	India U19		
2013–2016	India	15	(0)
- * Club domestic league appearances and goals

Aiborlang Khongjee (born 1987) is an Indian former professional footballer who played as a defender. He had also represented the India national team.

== Early life ==
Aibor, as he is affectionately called, belongs to a small town named Lyngkhat in East Khasi Hills district in Meghalaya. Football was his love since school days. He had also played Subroto Cup for his school Raidlaban Higher Secondary School. After his Class X exams, he moved to Shillong to join the Sports Authority of India. He started watching international football, and soon became a fan of John Terry. He has been a fan of Chelsea. Among the Indian defenders, Mahesh Gawli has been his favourite. He left SAI in 2005, and joined the local team Shillong Lajong next year as a stopper back.

== Playing career ==
=== East Bengal ===
In 2007, he was signed by Kolkata club East Bengal from Shillong Lajong. However, an injury-hit season meant that he got very few opportunities in the big club, and subsequently was sent back to his former club. However, Subrata Bhattacharya, the coach of the Red & Gold Brigade used Aiborlang as the side back for the first time.

=== Shillong Lajong ===
Having the experience of playing I-League for East Bengal, he was made the captain of the Shillong Lajong for the 2009–10 season, as they prepared for their I-League debut. In the 2009–10 season, he had given the hosts an early lead from the spot kick against Mohun Bagan in the 54th minute, but later strikes from Chidi Edeh and Marcos Pereira meant the hosts lose 1–2.

=== Mohun Bagan ===
On 24 March 2013 in the 2012-13 I-League, he scored with a header on the 5th minute against Pailan Arrows, and then assisted Tolgay Özbey on the 19th minute.

=== Return to Shillong Lajong ===
In August 2014 Khonjee joined Shillong Lajong for the third time in his career.

== Managerial career ==
Khonjee managed Meghalayan club Rangdajied United in the 2022–23 MSL season.

== Honours ==
India

- SAFF Championship: 2015

Shillong Lajong

- I-League 2nd Division: 2011

== Personal life ==
Khonjee is a member of the Khasi people.
