= Rajib Ghosh (footballer) =

Indian footballer (born 1989)

Personal information
- Date of birth: 12 July 1989 (age 37)
- Place of birth: West Bengal, India
- Position: Defender

Team information
- Current team: Mohun Bagan

Youth career
- 2004–2006: Ballygunge AC
- 2006–2008: Calcutta Port Trust

Senior career*
Years	Team	Apps	(Gls)
2008–2009	Kolkata Mohammedan		
2009–2010	Dhaka Mohammedan		
2010	Mohun Bagan		
2010–2011	East Bengal		
2011–2012	Pailan Arrows	14	(0)
2012–2013	Mohun Bagan	2	(0)
2013–2016	Bhawanipore		

International career
2007–2008	India U19	5	(0)
- * Club domestic league appearances and goals

Rajib Ghosh (Bengali: রাজীব ঘোষ; born 12 July 1989) is an Indian former footballer who last played as a defender for Calcutta Premier Division side Bhawanipore. He also represented West Bengal in Santosh Trophy, winning the 2009–10 season.

== Club career ==
=== Early career ===
Born in West Bengal, Ghosh started playing football very early, when he was 6–7 years old. He played Nursery League for the Avenue Lake Gardens team, where they finished runners-up. He played as a midfielder in that tournament.

After that stint, he joined Ballygunge AC, a 5th Division team in Kolkata where he played as a stopper. He then switched over to Milan Samity next season, where he played for two years. There also he played in centre-back.

He then moved to Kidderpore, where he spent two seasons. He played both as right back as well as defensive midfielder in that team. In his second season in Khidirpur (2005–06), they reached the Super Division (now Premier Division).

Ghosh first played in the CFL Premier Division during 2006–07 season, when he joined Calcutta Port Trust. The team was managed by Alok Mukherjee, who used him as left back. He got an offer to play for Mohammedan Sporting After that season, he got offer from Mohun Bagan and Salgaocar, but he had to stay in Mohammedan since he had two more years on his contract with them.

After that, he spent a year with East Bengal.

=== Dhaka Mohammedan ===
In 2009, Ghosh moved to Bangladesh and joined Premier League side Mohammedan Sporting Dhaka. He played there until 2010, before signing with Mohun Bagan.

=== Pailan Arrows ===
After his stint in Mohammedan, Ghosh joined Pailan Arrows in 2011. They played under the coaching of Sukhwinder Singh. Pailan participated in the 2011 Indian Federation Cup and finished second in group stages behind Salgaocar. They then began their 2011–12 I-League campaign against Mohun Bagan at the Salt Lake Stadium on 23 October 2012 in which they lost 1–3. Towards the end of the season, Pailan managed to win two matches, one against Chirag United Club Kerala and another against HAL to finished the season in 13th place out of 14 teams and were not relegated being a developmental team.

=== Mohun Bagan ===
Ghosh signed for Mohun Bagan AC of the I-League on 14 May 2012. He played only 2 matches.

=== Bhawanipore ===
In 2013, he moved to Calcutta Football League side Bhawanipore. In the I-League 2nd Division, the club achieved runners-up finish in 2014–15, with 17 points in 8 matches. They later achieved third place in 2012–13.

=== West Bengal ===
Ghosh also appeared with the West Bengal team in the 46th edition (2009–10 season) of Santosh Trophy. In the final on 8 August 2010, they clinched the title edging past Punjab 2–1 at the Vivekananda Yuba Bharati Krirangan.

== International career ==
While Rajib was in Mohammedan Sporting, Colin Toal called him to the India U19 national camp in Goa. He was also part of the team that participated in 2008 AFC Youth Championship qualification, where he appeared in five matches.

== Career statistics ==
=== Club ===
Statistics accurate as of 1 June 2013

Club	Season	League			Cup			AFC			Total		
Club	Season	Apps	Goals	Assists	Apps	Goals	Assists	Apps	Goals	Assists	Apps	Goals	Assists
Pailan Arrows	2011–12	14	0	0	0	0	0	—	—	—	14	0	0
Mohun Bagan	2012–13	2	0	0	0	0	0	-	-	-	2	0	0
Career total		16	0	0	0	0	0	0	0	0	16	0	0

== Honours ==
Mohun Bagan

- Federation Cup runner-up: 2010

West Bengal

- Santosh Trophy: 2009–10

== See also ==
- List of Indian football players in foreign leagues
