= 2015–16 Mohun Bagan FC season =

Indian football club season

Mohun Bagan
2015–16 season
- President: Swapan Sadhan Bose
- Head coach: Sanjoy Sen
- Stadium: Salt Lake Stadium; Barasat Stadium; Indira Gandhi Stadium
- I-League: Runners-up
- Calcutta Football League: 3rd
- AFC Champions League: Preliminary round 2
- AFC Cup: Round of 16
- Federation Cup: Champions
- Top goalscorer: League: Glen (11); All: Jeje (19)
- Highest home attendance: 62,342 (Mohun Bagan vs East Bengal); 23 January 2016
- Lowest home attendance: 282 (Mohun Bagan vs Tampines Rovers); 24 May 2016
Home colours	Away colours

The 2015–16 Mohun Bagan FC season was the club's 9th season in I-League and 126th season since its establishment in 1889. During this season, Mohun Bagan started the I-League as the defending champions (having won it last season). The team finished 3rd in the Calcutta Football League and runners-up in the I-League. Mohun Bagan were defeated by Shandong Luneng of China in the preliminary round 2 of the AFC Champions League and were eliminated from the competition at this stage. They bowed out of the AFC Cup in the round of 16 where they were defeated by the Tampines Rovers of Singapore. They were crowned Champions of the Federation Cup after they defeated Aizawl in the final.

== Season overview ==
=== August ===
On 9 August, Bagan started their season in the Calcutta Football League. Their start though wasn't as promising as their rivals, East Bengal.
They started their campaign against Mohammedan but weren't strong enough to score against them even after a Mohammedan player was sent off in the first half. The game finished with a scoreline that read 0–0. Their next match was against SAI Darjeeling. This match again was a disappointment for Bagan as they failed to score against a comparatively weaker opponent. This match ended 0–0 even though SAI Darjeeling played half of the game with u-20 players.
They played their next match against Southern Samity in which Bagan registered their first victory of the season. The Green and Maroon brigade won the match 5–2 in which Dudu Omagbemi scored a hat-trick and Katsumi Yusa scored the other two. They continued their winning ways in the next match against Bengal Nagpur Railway with a 3–0 drubbing of the weaker opponents. Katsumi Yusa scored a brace containing a free-kick goal and the other one was added by Dudu Omagbemi.
On 25 August Bagan tasted defeat for the first time in the season losing 1–0 against Army XI.
They returned to winning ways in the next game against Tollygunge Agragami where they defeated them 3–1, courtesy of two goals from Dudu Omagbemi and another from Lalkamal Bhowmick who scored after many games to be the first Indian to score for Bagan this season. On 31 August, Bagan's match against Aryan was abandoned after 20 minutes of play due to heavy rain and the scoreline hung at 0–0.

=== September ===
On 3 September they were up against Police AC and they won by 4–1 where Kean Lewis registered himself on the score sheet with a bang by scoring a brace.
On 6 September Bagan were up against their fiercest rivals East Bengal for the Kolkata Derby where they suffered a humiliating 4–0 loss and were out of the Calcutta Football League championship run. They played their last but one match against Kalighat M.S. and defeated them 4–1, courtesy of goals from Katsumi Yusa, Ram Malik, Azharuddin Mallick and Pankaj Moula. Their last match was against Aryan where they failed to break the deadlock as the Aryan goalie kept his goal safe and sound. The match ended 0–0.
More misery was about to come for the Mariners when the IFA announced deduction of 3 points from Bagan's tally, as they played the last few minutes of their match with Tollygunge Agragami without the mandatory u-23 player on the field. The match was counted as a loss for Mohun Bagan and all the goals scored in the match were nullified.

=== October–December ===
The Hero ISL 2015 that started on 3 October and continued till 20 December put a brake on the Indian domestic football season as most players from various clubs joined the ISL franchisees. On 2 October, Bagan pulled off a stunning transfer by signing the Trinidad world-cupper Cornell Glen from Shillong Lajong filling in the void of the 4th foreign recruit, although the drama continued over the signing of Sony Norde. All controversies were however put to rest when the Haitian International himself confirmed his joining Mohun Bagan for the season while he was in Kolkata as part of the Mumbai City team that faced Atlético de Kolkata in an ISL match.
Mohun Bagan did not take part in any competitive tournaments in these three months. They played a few friendlies and exhibition games against a few local teams where Cornell Glen found the back of the net regularly.

=== January ===
Right before the start of the I-League Bagan smelled a breath of fresh air with Indian international Jeje Lalpekhlua and Mumbai City midfielder Brandon Fernandes confirming their association with the Green and Maroon brigade. Mohun Bagan decided to release Haitian international Judelin Aveska before the start of the I-League and decided to sign former Pune defender Luciano Sabrosa adding a lot of strength to a jittery defensive line.
Bagan started off their I-League campaign with a 3–1 win over minnows and newcomers Aizawl, where Glen scored a brace while Balwant Singh netted in the third. They kept up their winning habits in the second match as well, where they defeated Salgaocar 4–2. The Green and Maroon brigade went in as the favorites in the year's first Derby when they met arch rivals East Bengal. The match ended in a 1–1 stalemate where Ranti Martins put the Red and Golds in the lead, only to be equalized by Cornell Glen 10 minutes later.
Mohun Bagan created history in the AFC Champions League when they defeated the Tampines Rovers of Singapore 3–1, becoming the first Indian club to win a match at this level, since the competition was re-formatted in 2009. In a match that saw a series of missed chances by the Green and Maroon brigade, it was the magic left foot of Sony Norde that proved fatal for the Tampines Rovers. Jeje Lalpekhlua and Cornell Glen scored in the first half, while Katsumi Yusa found the back of the net in the second half from a Sony Norde corner.
The Mariners wrapped up the month on a high, in their first away match of the I-League at the Balewadi Sports Complex, Pune drubbing the new league outfits DSK Shivajians 2–0, courtesy of a brace from Sony Norde.

=== February ===
Bagan started off the month on a very low note, with a humiliating 6–0 loss to Shandong Luneng at Jinan in the preliminary round 2 of the AFC Champions League which eliminated them from the competition and put them in the group stage of the AFC Cup. They could not return to winning ways even on Indian soil where they were held to a 0–0 draw by Mumbai in an away encounter at the Cooperage Football Stadium, Mumbai. The Green and Maroons returned to winning ways by defeating Bengaluru FC 2–0 at the Sree Kanteerava Stadium. Jeje Lalpekhlua and Sony Norde found the back of the net in the match and this win propelled Bagan to the 2nd position in the I-League table. In their next match at home they managed a 1–1 draw with Shillong Lajong, thanks to a Jeje Lalpekhlua strike which ensured that they reached the top of the table. They guaranteed that they stay at the top at mid-season, when they defeated Sporting Goa 1–0 in a home game, courtesy of the solitary goal from their captain for the match, Katsumi Yusa. Mohun Bagan kicked off their AFC Cup campaign in style as they demolished Maziya of Maldives 5–2 in a home encounter at the Indira Gandhi Athletic Stadium, Guwahati. Jeje Lalpekhlua and Cornell Glen scored braces after Sony Norde had netted in a beautiful curling free kick to open the scoring for Bagan against the Maldives outfit. They continued the same form into the return leg of the I-League where they defeated Salgaocar 3–1 to wrap up the month on a high. Cornell Glen returned to goals in the I-League scoring a brace, while Jeje Lalpekhlua scored the other goal.

=== March ===
The Green and Maroon brigade started off the month with a 1–1 draw against Sporting Goa in an away encounter which ensured they maintained the top spot in the I-League after 10 matches. On 3 March 2016 the AIFF suspended Bagan's head coach Sanjoy Sen for 8 I-League matches and fined him Rs. 10 lakhs for his comments against the Federation made after the AFC Champions League match against the Tampines Rovers on 27 January 2016. Sanjoy Sen made the comments after the AIFF refused to reschedule Mohun Bagan's I-League match in spite of their close schedule in the AFC Champions League. Mohun Bagan continued their AFC Cup campaign in style when they travelled away to Hong Kong and convincingly defeated South China 4–0, courtesy of goals from Jeje Lalpekhlua, Cornell Glen, Lenny Rodrigues and Sony Norde. Bagan returned to winning ways in the I-League, cementing their place at the top of the table with an emphatic 2–0 win over Mumbai thanks to goals from Katsumi Yusa and Sony Norde. The Green and Maroons continued their amazing form in the AFC Cup with a 3–2 victory over Yangon United at the Indira Gandhi Stadium, Guwahati courtesy of a brace from Jeje and a sublime header from Sony Norde. This win ensured Mohun Bagan remained at the top of their group. Mohun Bagan lost their first match of the I-League 1–2 owing to a shambolic display against Aizawl to end the month on a disappointing note. On 31 March 2016 the AIFF Appeals Committee reduced the suspension of Sanjoy Sen from 8 matches to 4 and halved the amount of fine payable to Rs. 5 lakhs.

=== April ===
Mohun Bagan were up against arch rivals East Bengal in the first match of the month on 2 April 2016. However, in spite of a spirited display by the Green and Maroon brigade, luck was not on their side when they succumbed to a 2–1 loss. East Bengal went ahead in the game, courtesy of a controversial penalty awarded in the 39th minute and doubled their lead in the 73rd. Bagan pulled one back, courtesy of a scintillating header from Katsumi Yusa. In the final moments of the match Bagan got a golden chance to draw level from the penalty spot but a feeble effort from Jeje Lalpekhlua was saved by the goalkeeper comfortably. Bagan still remained top of the table in spite of the loss but had played a match more than the other teams in championship contention. Bagan made the championship more difficult for themselves when they drew 2–2 against Shillong Lajong in an away encounter. Jeje Lalpekhlua and Katsumi Yusa gave Bagan the lead twice in the match but a late last minute equaliser by Uilliams Bomfim Souza broke Green and Maroon hearts all over the country. The Mariners were virtually out of the championship contention when they managed to salvage only a point following their 3–3 draw with newbies DSK Shivajians. To add insult to injury their assistant coach Sankarlal Chakraborty was handed out a 2 match suspension and a monetary fine by the AIFF on the same day because of abusive language used against the referee in the derby match on 2 April 2016. Mohun Bagan played their 5th consecutive match without a win when they pulled off a 1–1 draw with Yangon United in their AFC Cup away match. The hosts went ahead in the 26th minute only to be equalised 16 minutes later by Cornell Glen. Bagan's consecutive I-League title dream crashed when Bengaluru FC defeated Salgaocar 2–0 at home to lift the I-League for the second time in history. This reduced the Mohun Bagan–Bengaluru FC match on 23 April to a mere formality. Mohun Bagan humiliated the recently crowned I-League champions, Bengaluru FC 5–0 to return to winning ways in the I-League. Mohun Bagan went ahead 4–0 within the first 30 minutes of the match, courtesy of goals from Glen, Lenny Rodrigues, Luciano Sabrosa and the young Azharuddin Mallick. In the second half Cornell Glen netted in his second of the match and hammered the last pin in the Bengaluru FC coffin making the scoreline 5–0. Mohun Bagan secured their spot at the top of their group in the AFC Cup when they managed to salvage a point against Maziya with a 1–1 draw. Maziya went ahead in the match first, while a Jeje Lalpekhlua header pulled it back for Bagan in the dying stages of the match.

=== May ===
Mohun Bagan started off the month on a positive note when they defeated Salgaocar in a quarter final away encounter of the Federation Cup. Jeje scored a brace while Abhishek Das netted in the other goal for Bagan. In the return leg of the quarter final tie, the Mariners demolished Salgaocar 4–0 riding on a brace from Haitian playmaker Sony Norde and goals from Katsumi Yusa and Jeje Lalpekhlua. This win ensured Bagan a place in the semi-finals of the Federation Cup. The Green and Maroon brigade thumped Shillong Lajong 5–0 in their home tie in the Federation Cup semi-final. Jeje scored a hat-trick while the other two goals came from Bikramjit Singh and young Azharuddin. Such a dominating win put Bagan in a hugely advantageous position before their away encounter. Mohun Bagan's 'unbeaten at home' streak came to an end with a demoralising 3–0 loss against South China in their final, but inconsequential group game, in the AFC Cup campaign. This loss however did not affect Bagan's position at the top of the group and they finished the group stage as group toppers to set up a clash with the Singapore-based club Tampines Rovers in the round of 16. In the return leg away encounter of the semi-final of the Federation Cup, Bagan played out a 0–0 draw with their opponents Shillong Lajong to secure a place in the final, by virtue of a 5–0 aggregate score. Mohun Bagan sealed their first trophy in the season, when they were crowned champions of the Federation Cup after the final match. Mohun Bagan defeated underdogs Aizawl 5–0 with a brace from Jeje Lalpekhlua and goals each from Sony Norde, Dhanachandra Singh and Bikramjit Singh. Mohun Bagan fielded a very weakened side owing to injuries in the last match of their season against the Tampines Rovers in their AFC Cup Round of 16 match. They were unable to finish the season on a high as they went down 2–1 to their Singaporean opponents and thus bowed out of the 2016 edition of the competition. A highly weakened Mohun Bagan were further weakened by the injury of striker Cornell Glen in the 40th minute. It was the visitors who opened scoring in the 63rd minute with a Jordan Webb goal. Bagan did not delay much to strike back as Bikramjit Singh scored a scorcher of a goal to make it 1–1. This remained the scoreline at the end of 90 minutes and thus the match headed into extra time. In the 116th minute of the match it was Afiq Yunos who slotted in a corner kick to give the Tampines Rovers the winning goal.

== Transfers ==
=== In ===
==== Pre-season ====
No.	Pos.	Name	Signed from	Ref.
1	GK	(India) Arnab Das Sharma	(India) Mohammedan	
21	DF	(India) Sanjay Balmuchu	(India) Mohammedan	
33	DF	(India) Prabir Das	(India) Dempo	
~~3~~	DF	(Brazil) Gustavo Silva Conceição	(United States) Orlando City	
~~11~~	DF	(Haiti) Judelin Aveska	(Argentina) Club Almagro	
~~14~~	DF	(India) Safar Sardar	(India) East Bengal	
~~21~~	DF	(India) Prasenjit Pal	(India) Kalighat M.S.	
9	MF	(India) Kean Lewis	(United States) Houston Dynamo	
32	MF	(India) Robinson Singh	(India) AIFF Elite Academy	
42	MF	(India) Lenny Rodrigues	(India) Dempo	
~~36~~	MF	(India) Asif Kottayil	(India) Bharat FC	
35	FW	(India) Azharuddin Mallick	(India) United	
~~9~~	FW	(Nigeria) Dudu Omagbemi	(India) East Bengal	
~~29~~	FW	(India) Raja Das	(India) Kalighat M.S.	

==== Mid-season ====
No.	Pos.	Name	Signed from	Ref.
2	DF	(Brazil) Luciano Sabrosa	(India) FC Goa	
3	DF	(India) Raju Gaikwad	(India) East Bengal	
14	DF	(India) Sarthak Golui	(India) AIFF Elite Academy	
11	MF	(India) Pronay Halder	(India) Dempo	
13	FW	(Trinidad and Tobago) Cornell Glen	(India) Shillong Lajong	

=== Out ===
==== Pre-season ====
Pos.	Name	Sold to	Ref.
GK	(India) Monotosh Ghosh	Released	
GK	(India) Laltu Mondal	Released	
DF	(Nigeria) Bello Razaq	(India) East Bengal	
DF	(India) Anwar Ali	Released	
DF	(India) Johny Routh	(India) East Bengal	
DF	(India) Satish Singh	Released	
DF	(India) Sonam Bhutia	Released	
MF	(India) Denson Devadas	(India) Sporting Goa	
MF	(India) Randeep Singh	Released	
FW	(India) Chinadorai Sabeeth	(India) East Bengal	
FW	(Cameroon) Pierre Boya	Released	

==== Mid-season ====
No.	Pos.	Name	Sold to	Ref.
~~2~~	DF	(India) Pratik Chaudhari	(India) Mumbai	
~~3~~	DF	(Brazil) Gustavo Silva Conceição	Released	
~~11~~	DF	(Haiti) Judelin Aveska	Released	
~~14~~	DF	(India) Safar Sardar	Released	
~~18~~	DF	(India) Sukhen Dey	Released	
~~21~~	DF	(India) Prasenjit Pal	Released	
~~20~~	MF	(India) Ujjal Howladar	Released	
~~33~~	MF	(India) Aayushmaan Chaturvedi	Released	
~~36~~	MF	(India) Asif Kottayil	(India) Mumbai	
~~9~~	FW	(Nigeria) Dudu Omagbemi	Released	
~~29~~	FW	(India) Raja Das	Released	
~~37~~	FW	(India) Prakash Roy	Released	

== Kits ==
Supplier: Shiv Naresh / Sponsors: Legion

Home	Away	Goalkeeper

== Squad ==
=== First-team squad ===
Squad no.	Name	Nationality	Position	Date of birth (age)
Goalkeepers
1	Arnab Das Sharma	(India)	GK	10 June 1988 (age 38)
22	Vinay Singh	(India)	GK	16 October 1977 (age 49)
24	Debjit Majumder	(India)	GK	6 March 1988 (age 38)
31	Shilton Pal (captain)	(India)	GK	20 December 1987 (age 38)
Defenders
2	Luciano Sabrosa	(Brazil)	DF	25 July 1979 (age 47)
3	Raju Gaikwad	(India)	DF	25 August 1990 (age 36)
4	Kingshuk Debnath	(India)	DF	8 May 1985 (age 41)
5	Dhanachandra Singh	(India)	DF	4 March 1987 (age 39)
12	Pritam Kotal	(India)	DF	9 August 1993 (age 33)
14	Sarthak Golui	(India)	DF	3 November 1997 (age 29)
21	Sanjay Balmuchu	(India)	DF	5 January 1992 (age 34)
26	Shouvik Ghosh	(India)	DF	5 November 1992 (age 34)
28	Abhishek Das (loaned from Chennaiyin)	(India)	DF	5 November 1993 (age 33)
33	Prabir Das	(India)	DF	20 December 1993 (age 32)
39	Suman Hazra	(India)	DF	—
Midfielders
6	Bikramjit Singh	(India)	MF	15 October 1992 (age 34)
8	Lalkamal Bhowmick	(India)	MF	2 January 1987 (age 39)
9	Kean Lewis	(India)	MF	19 September 1992 (age 34)
10	Katsumi Yusa (vice-captain)	(Japan)	MF	2 August 1988 (age 38)
11	Pronay Halder	(India)	MF	25 February 1993 (age 33)
16	Sony Norde	(Haiti)	MF	27 July 1989 (age 37)
17	Ram Malik	(India)	MF	10 March 1991 (age 35)
20	Brandon Fernandes (loaned from Mumbai City)	(India)	MF	20 September 1994 (age 32)
23	Souvik Chakraborty	(India)	MF	12 July 1991 (age 35)
25	Tirthankar Sarkar	(India)	MF	1 July 1993 (age 33)
27	Adarsh Tamang	(India)	MF	5 July 1995 (age 31)
30	Pankaj Moula	(India)	MF	20 December 1992 (age 33)
32	Robinson Singh	(India)	MF	3 February 1997 (age 29)
34	Manish Bhargav	(India)	MF	24 February 1994 (age 32)
42	Lenny Rodrigues	(India)	MF	10 May 1987 (age 39)
Forwards
7	Jeje Lalpekhlua	(India)	FW	7 January 1991 (age 35)
13	Cornell Glen	(Trinidad and Tobago)	FW	21 October 1980 (age 46)
15	Balwant Singh	(India)	FW	15 December 1986 (age 39)
35	Azharuddin Mallick	(India)	FW	11 July 1997 (age 29)
40	Subhash Singh (loaned from Mumbai City)	(India)	FW	2 February 1990 (age 36)

Last updated: 9 January 2016
Source: mohunbaganac.com

== Technical staff ==
Position	Name
Chief coach	(India) Sanjoy Sen
Assistant coach	(India) Sankarlal Chakraborty
Goalkeeping coach	(India) Arpan Dey
Physical Trainer	(Brazil) Djair Miranda Garcia
Physiotherapist	(India) Abhinandan Chatterjee
Club Doctor	(India) Dr. Protim Ray
Team Manager	(India) Satyajit Chatterjee

Source: Mohunbaganac.com

== Statistics ==
=== Calcutta Football League stats ===
Win Draw Loss

Opposition	Score
Army XI	0–1
Aryan	0–0
Bengal Nagpur Railway	3–0
East Bengal	0–4
Kalighat MS	4–1
Mohammedan	0–0
Police A.C.	4–1
SAI Darjeeling	0–0
Southern Samity	5–2
Tollygunge Agragami	0–0

Last updated: 14 September 2015
Source: Statistics

==== Goal scorers ====
No.	Pos.	Nat.	Name	Goal(s)	Appearance(s)
~~9~~	FW	(Nigeria)	Dudu Omagbemi	5	7
10	MF	(Japan)	Katsumi Yusa	5	10
9	MF	(India)	Kean Lewis	2	9
17	MF	(India)	Ram Malik	1	6
35	FW	(India)	Azharuddin Mallick	1	8
8	MF	(India)	Lalkamal Bhowmick	1	8
30	MF	(India)	Pankaj Moula	1	10
TOTAL				16	10

Last updated: 14 September 2015
Source: Matches

==== Disciplinary record ====
No.	Pos.	Nat.	Player	Yellow card	(yellow card) (yellow-red card)	Red card	Notes
8	MF	(India)	Lalkamal Bhowmick	1	1	0	Missed match: vs Kalighat M.S. (9 September 2015)
~~9~~	FW	(Nigeria)	Dudu Omagbemi	0	1	0	Missed match: vs Kalighat M.S. (9 September 2015)
23	MF	(India)	Souvik Chakraborty	2	0	0	Missed match: vs Bengal Nagpur Railway (21 August 2015)
12	DF	(India)	Pritam Kotal	2	0	0	Missed match: vs Bengal Nagpur Railway (21 August 2015)
10	MF	(Japan)	Katsumi Yusa	1	0	0	
21	DF	(India)	Sanjay Balmuchu	1	0	0	
~~18~~	DF	(India)	Sukhen Dey	1	0	0	

Last updated: 14 September 2015
Source: Matches

=== I-League stats ===
Win Draw Loss

Opposition	Home score	Away score
Aizawl	3–1	1–2
Bengaluru FC	5–0	2–0
DSK Shivajians	3–3	2–0
East Bengal	1–1	1–2
Mumbai	2–0	0–0
Salgaocar	4–2	3–1
Shillong Lajong	1–1	2–2
Sporting Goa	1–0	1–1

Last updated: 23 April 2016
Source: Statistics

==== Goal scorers ====
No.	Pos.	Nat.	Name	Goal(s)	Appearance(s)
13	FW	(Trinidad and Tobago)	Cornell Glen	11	16
16	MF	(Haiti)	Sony Norde	5	11
10	MF	(Japan)	Katsumi Yusa	5	16
7	FW	(India)	Jeje Lalpekhlua	4	14
15	FW	(India)	Balwant Singh	2	6
2	DF	(Brazil)	Luciano Sabrosa	2	15
20	MF	(India)	Brandon Fernandes	1	4
35	FW	(India)	Azharuddin Mallick	1	6
42	MF	(India)	Lenny Rodrigues	1	8
TOTAL				32	16

Last updated: 23 April 2016
Source: Matches

==== Disciplinary record ====
No.	Pos.	Nat.	Player	Yellow card	(yellow card) (yellow-red card)	Red card	Notes
11	MF	(India)	Pronay Halder	8	0	0	Missed match: vs Salgaocar (27 February 2016); Missed match: vs Bengaluru FC (23 April 2016)
2	DF	(Brazil)	Luciano Sabrosa	6	0	0	Missed match: vs Salgaocar (27 February 2016)
12	DF	(India)	Pritam Kotal	3	0	0	
6	MF	(India)	Bikramjit Singh	2	0	0	
10	MF	(Japan)	Katsumi Yusa	2	0	0	
3	DF	(India)	Raju Gaikwad	2	0	0	
4	DF	(India)	Kingshuk Debnath	2	0	0	
5	DF	(India)	Dhanachandra Singh	2	0	0	
13	FW	(Trinidad and Tobago)	Cornell Glen	1	0	0	
15	FW	(India)	Balwant Singh	1	0	0	
23	MF	(India)	Souvik Chakraborty	1	0	0	

Last updated: 23 April 2016
Source: Matches

=== AFC Champions League stats ===
Win Draw Loss

Opposition	Home score	Away score
(Singapore) Tampines Rovers	3–1	No away match
(China) Shandong Luneng	No home match	0–6

Last updated: 2 February 2016
Source: Statistics

==== Goal scorers ====
No.	Pos.	Nat.	Name	Goal(s)	Appearance(s)
13	FW	(Trinidad and Tobago)	Cornell Glen	1	1
7	FW	(India)	Jeje Lalpekhlua	1	2
10	MF	(Japan)	Katsumi Yusa	1	2
TOTAL				3	2

Last updated: 2 February 2016
Source: Matches

==== Disciplinary record ====
No.	Pos.	Nat.	Player	Yellow card	(yellow card) (yellow-red card)	Red card	Notes
11	MF	(India)	Pronay Halder	1	0	0	
4	DF	(India)	Kingshuk Debnath	1	0	0	
28	DF	(India)	Abhishek Das	1	0	0	
24	GK	(India)	Debjit Majumder	1	0	0	

Last updated: 2 February 2016
Source: Matches

=== AFC Cup stats ===
Win Draw Loss

Opposition	Home score	Away score
(Hong Kong) South China	0–3	4–0
(Myanmar) Yangon United	3–2	1–1
(Maldives) Maziya	5–2	1–1
(Singapore) Tampines Rovers	1–2	No away match

Last updated: 24 May 2016
Source: Statistics

==== Goal scorers ====
No.	Pos.	Nat.	Name	Goal(s)	Appearance(s)
7	FW	(India)	Jeje Lalpekhlua	6	7
13	FW	(Trinidad and Tobago)	Cornell Glen	4	5
16	MF	(Haiti)	Sony Norde	3	3
6	MF	(India)	Bikramjit Singh	1	6
42	MF	(India)	Lenny Rodrigues	1	7
TOTAL				15	7

Last updated: 11 May 2016
Source: Matches

==== Disciplinary record ====
No.	Pos.	Nat.	Player	Yellow card	(yellow card) (yellow-red card)	Red card	Notes
6	MF	(India)	Bikramjit Singh	2	0	0	Missed match: vs South China (11 May 2016)
3	DF	(India)	Raju Gaikwad	2	0	0	
2	DF	(Brazil)	Luciano Sabrosa	2	0	0	Missed match: vs Maziya (27 April 2016)
26	DF	(India)	Shouvik Ghosh	2	0	0	Missed match: vs Tampines Rovers (24 May 2016)
7	FW	(India)	Jeje Lalpekhlua	1	0	0	
13	FW	(Trinidad and Tobago)	Cornell Glen	1	0	0	
11	MF	(India)	Pronay Halder	1	0	0	
5	DF	(India)	Dhanachandra Singh	1	0	0	
21	DF	(India)	Sanjay Balmuchu	1	0	0	
1	GK	(India)	Arnab Das Sharma	1	0	0	

Last updated: 24 May 2016
Source: Matches

=== Federation Cup stats ===
Win Draw Loss

Opposition	Home score	Away score	Aggregate
Salgaocar	4–0	3–2	7–2
Shillong Lajong	5–0	0–0	5–0
Aizawl	5–0	No away match	No aggregate

Last updated: 21 May 2016
Source: Statistics

==== Goal scorers ====
No.	Pos.	Nat.	Name	Goal(s)	Appearance(s)
7	FW	(India)	Jeje Lalpekhlua	8	5
16	MF	(Haiti)	Sony Norde	3	4
6	MF	(India)	Bikramjit Singh	2	4
28	DF	(India)	Abhishek Das	1	1
35	FW	(India)	Azharuddin Mallick	1	4
10	MF	(Japan)	Katsumi Yusa	1	5
5	DF	(India)	Dhanachandra Singh	1	5
TOTAL				17	5

Last updated: 21 May 2016
Source: Matches

==== Disciplinary record ====
No.	Pos.	Nat.	Player	Yellow card	(yellow card) (yellow-red card)	Red card	Notes
11	MF	(India)	Pronay Halder	1	0	0	
4	DF	(India)	Kingshuk Debnath	1	0	0	

Last updated: 21 May 2016
Source: Matches

== Player statistics ==
=== Appearances and goals ===
No.	Pos	Nat	Player	Total		CFL		I-League		ACL and AFC Cup		Fed Cup	
No.	Pos	Nat	Player	Apps	Goals	Apps	Goals	Apps	Goals	Apps	Goals	Apps	Goals
1	GK	(India) IND	Arnab Das Sharma	7	0	2+0	0	1+0	0	4+0	0	0+0	0
22	GK	(India) IND	Vinay Singh	1	0	0+1	0	0+0	0	0+0	0	0+0	0
24	GK	(India) IND	Debjit Majumder	26	0	3+0	0	14+0	0	4+0	0	5+0	0
31	GK	(India) IND	Shilton Pal	7	0	5+0	0	1+0	0	1+0	0	0+0	0
2	DF	(Brazil) BRA	Luciano Sabrosa	28	2	0+0	0	15+0	2	7+1	0	5+0	0
3	DF	(India) IND	Raju Gaikwad	16	0	0+0	0	7+1	0	6+0	0	1+1	0
4	DF	(India) IND	Kingshuk Debnath	25	0	0+0	0	15+0	0	6+0	0	4+0	0
5	DF	(India) IND	Dhanachandra Singh	24	1	0+0	0	14+0	0	5+0	0	5+0	1
12	DF	(India) IND	Pritam Kotal	16	0	3+0	0	6+0	0	2+0	0	5+0	0
14	DF	(India) IND	Sarthak Golui	2	0	0+0	0	1+1	0	0+0	0	0+0	0
21	DF	(India) IND	Sanjay Balmuchu	17	0	9+0	0	3+1	0	2+2	0	0+0	0
26	DF	(India) IND	Shouvik Ghosh	4	0	0+0	0	0+0	0	2+2	0	0+0	0
28	DF	(India) IND	Abhishek Das (loaned from Chennaiyin)	8	1	0+0	0	0+3	0	1+3	0	0+1	1
33	DF	(India) IND	Prabir Das	19	0	0+0	0	4+8	0	4+2	0	0+1	0
39	DF	(India) IND	Suman Hazra	7	0	7+0	0	0+0	0	0+0	0	0+0	0
~~2~~	DF	(India) IND	Pratik Chaudhari	4	0	4+0	0	0+0	0	0+0	0	0+0	0
~~3~~	DF	(Brazil) BRA	Gustavo Silva Conceição	3	0	1+2	0	0+0	0	0+0	0	0+0	0
~~11~~	DF	(Haiti) HAI	Judelin Aveska	3	0	2+1	0	0+0	0	0+0	0	0+0	0
~~14~~	DF	(India) IND	Safar Sardar	7	0	6+1	0	0+0	0	0+0	0	0+0	0
~~18~~	DF	(India) IND	Sukhen Dey	8	0	7+1	0	0+0	0	0+0	0	0+0	0
~~21~~	DF	(India) IND	Prasenjit Pal	2	0	1+1	0	0+0	0	0+0	0	0+0	0
6	MF	(India) IND	Bikramjit Singh	18	3	0+0	0	3+5	0	2+4	1	4+0	2
8	MF	(India) IND	Lalkamal Bhowmick	9	0	8+0	0	0+0	0	1+0	0	0+0	0
9	MF	(India) IND	Kean Lewis	20	2	5+4	2	3+3	0	2+2	0	1+0	0
10	MF	(Japan) JPN	Katsumi Yusa	39	12	8+2	5	15+1	5	8+0	1	5+0	1
11	MF	(India) IND	Pronay Halder	21	0	0+0	0	10+1	0	7+0	0	3+0	0
16	MF	(Haiti) HAI	Sony Norde	20	11	0+0	0	11+0	5	5+0	3	4+0	3
17	MF	(India) IND	Ram Malik	6	1	5+1	1	0+0	0	0+0	0	0+0	0
20	MF	(India) IND	Brandon Fernandes (loaned from Mumbai City)	4	1	0+0	0	4+0	1	0+0	0	0+0	0
23	MF	(India) IND	Souvik Chakraborty	27	0	3+0	0	4+9	0	2+4	0	0+5	0
25	MF	(India) IND	Tirthankar Sarkar	6	0	3+0	0	0+0	0	1+1	0	0+1	0
30	MF	(India) IND	Pankaj Moula	11	1	4+6	1	0+1	0	0+0	0	0+0	0
32	MF	(India) IND	Robinson Singh	2	0	0+1	0	0+1	0	0+0	0	0+0	0
34	MF	(India) IND	Manish Bhargav	6	0	0+2	0	4+0	0	0+0	0	0+0	0
42	MF	(India) IND	Lenny Rodrigues	19	2	0+0	0	8+0	1	6+1	1	3+1	0
~~20~~	MF	(India) IND	Ujjal Howladar	2	0	1+1	0	0+0	0	0+0	0	0+0	0
~~36~~	MF	(India) IND	Asif Kottayil	6	0	6+0	0	0+0	0	0+0	0	0+0	0
7	FW	(India) IND	Jeje Lalpekhlua	28	19	0+0	0	10+4	4	9+0	7	5+0	8
13	FW	(Trinidad and Tobago) TTO	Cornell Glen	26	16	0+0	0	16+0	11	6+0	5	3+1	0
15	FW	(India) IND	Balwant Singh	5	2	0+0	0	2+3	2	0+0	0	0+0	0
35	FW	(India) IND	Azharuddin Mallick	18	3	7+1	1	5+1	1	0+0	0	1+3	1
40	FW	(India) IND	Subhash Singh (loaned from Mumbai City)	7	0	0+0	0	1+0	0	4+1	0	1+0	0
~~9~~	FW	(Nigeria) NGR	Dudu Omagbemi	7	5	7+0	5	0+0	0	0+0	0	0+0	0
~~29~~	FW	(India) IND	Raja Das	2	0	2+0	0	0+0	0	0+0	0	0+0	0
~~37~~	FW	(India) IND	Prakash Roy	1	0	0+1	0	0+0	0	0+0	0	0+0	0

- Source: mohunbaganac.com

Last updated: 24 May 2016
Apps: (Matches Started)+(Substitute Appearances)

=== Disciplinary record ===
No.	Pos.	Nat.	Player	CFL			I-League			ACL and AFC Cup			Fed Cup			Total			Notes
No.	Pos.	Nat.	Player	Yellow card	(yellow card) (yellow-red card)	Red card	Yellow card	(yellow card) (yellow-red card)	Red card	Yellow card	(yellow card) (yellow-red card)	Red card	Yellow card	(yellow card) (yellow-red card)	Red card	Yellow card	(yellow card) (yellow-red card)	Red card	Notes
8	MF	(India)	Lalkamal Bhowmick	1	1	0	0	0	0	0	0	0	0	0	0	1	1	0	Missed match: vs Kalighat M.S. (9 September 2015)
~~9~~	FW	(Nigeria)	Dudu Omagbemi	0	1	0	0	0	0	0	0	0	0	0	0	0	1	0	Missed match: vs Kalighat M.S. (9 September 2015)
11	MF	(India)	Pronay Halder	0	0	0	8	0	0	2	0	0	1	0	0	11	0	0	Missed match: vs Salgaocar (27 February 2016); Missed match: vs Bengaluru FC (23 April 2016)
2	DF	(Brazil)	Luciano Sabrosa	0	0	0	6	0	0	2	0	0	0	0	0	8	0	0	Missed match: vs Salgaocar (27 February 2016); Missed match: vs Maziya (27 April 2016)
12	DF	(India)	Pritam Kotal	2	0	0	3	0	0	0	0	0	0	0	0	5	0	0	Missed match: vs Bengal Nagpur Railway (21 August 2015)
6	MF	(India)	Bikramjit Singh	0	0	0	2	0	0	2	0	0	0	0	0	4	0	0	Missed match: vs South China (11 May 2016)
3	DF	(India)	Raju Gaikwad	0	0	0	2	0	0	2	0	0	0	0	0	4	0	0	
4	DF	(India)	Kingshuk Debnath	0	0	0	2	0	0	1	0	0	1	0	0	4	0	0	
10	MF	(Japan)	Katsumi Yusa	1	0	0	2	0	0	0	0	0	0	0	0	3	0	0	
23	MF	(India)	Souvik Chakraborty	2	0	0	1	0	0	0	0	0	0	0	0	3	0	0	Missed match: vs Bengal Nagpur Railway (21 August 2015)
5	DF	(India)	Dhanachandra Singh	0	0	0	2	0	0	1	0	0	0	0	0	3	0	0	
13	FW	(Trinidad and Tobago)	Cornell Glen	0	0	0	1	0	0	1	0	0	0	0	0	2	0	0	
21	DF	(India)	Sanjay Balmuchu	1	0	0	0	0	0	1	0	0	0	0	0	2	0	0	
26	DF	(India)	Shouvik Ghosh	0	0	0	0	0	0	2	0	0	0	0	0	2	0	0	Missed match: vs Tampines Rovers (24 May 2016)
7	FW	(India)	Jeje Lalpekhlua	0	0	0	0	0	0	1	0	0	0	0	0	1	0	0	
15	FW	(India)	Balwant Singh	0	0	0	1	0	0	0	0	0	0	0	0	1	0	0	
28	DF	(India)	Abhishek Das	0	0	0	0	0	0	1	0	0	0	0	0	1	0	0	
~~18~~	DF	(India)	Sukhen Dey	1	0	0	0	0	0	0	0	0	0	0	0	1	0	0	
1	GK	(India)	Arnab Das Sharma	0	0	0	0	0	0	1	0	0	0	0	0	1	0	0	
24	GK	(India)	Debjit Majumder	0	0	0	0	0	0	1	0	0	0	0	0	1	0	0	

Last updated: 24 May 2016
Source: Matches

== Competitions ==
=== Overall ===
Competition	Started round	Current position / round	Final position / round	First match	Last match
Calcutta Football League	–	–	3rd	9 August 2015	14 September 2015
I-League	–	–	2nd	9 January 2016	23 April 2016
AFC Champions League	Preliminary Round 1	–	Preliminary Round 2	27 January 2016	2 February 2016
AFC Cup	Group Stage	–	Round of 16	24 February 2016	24 May 2016
Federation Cup	Quarter finals	–	Champions	2 May 2016	21 May 2016

Last updated: 24 May 2016
Source: Competitions

=== Overview ===
Competition	Record							
Competition	Pld	W	D	L	GF	GA	GD	Win %
Calcutta Football League	10	4	3	3	16	9	+7	40.00
I-League	16	8	6	2	32	16	+16	50.00
ACL and AFC Cup	9	4	2	3	18	18	+0	44.44
Federation Cup	5	4	1	0	17	2	+15	80.00
Total	40	20	12	8	83	45	+38	50.00

Last updated: 24 May 2016
Source: Competitions

=== Calcutta Football League ===
2015–16 Calcutta Premier Division

=== I-League ===
Pos	Team	Pld	W	D	L	GF	GA	GD	Pts	Qualification or relegation
1	Bengaluru (C)	16	10	2	4	24	17	+7	32	Qualification to Champions League qualifying play-off
2	Mohun Bagan	16	8	6	2	32	16	+16	30	Qualification to AFC Cup qualifying play-off (Note: Mohun Bagan qualified for the 2017 AFC Cup by winning the 2015–16 Federation Cup.)
3	East Bengal	16	7	4	5	22	18	+4	25	
4	Sporting Goa	16	5	7	4	24	20	+4	22	Withdrew (Note: Sporting Goa and Salgaocar withdrew from I-League.)
5	Mumbai	16	4	7	5	20	19	+1	19	

Source: I-League
Rules for classification: 1) points; 2) head-to-head points; 3) head-to-head goal difference; 4) goal difference; 5) number of goals scored; 6) play-off match
(C) Champions

==== Results by round ====
Round	1	2	3	4	5	6	7	8	9	10	11	12	13	14	15	16
Ground	H	H	H	A	H	A	A	H	A	A	A	H	A	A	H	H
Result	W	W	D	W	D	D	W	W	W	D	L	W	L	D	D	W
Position	2	1	2	2	1	3	2	1	1	1	1	1	1	1	2	2

Updated to match(es) played on 24 April 2016. Source: Matches
A = Away; H = Home; W = Win; D = Draw; L = Loss

=== AFC Champions League ===
==== Preliminary round 1 ====
East Zone
Team 1	Score	Team 2
Mohun Bagan (India)	3–1	(Singapore) Tampines Rovers

==== Preliminary round 2 ====
East Zone
Team 1	Score	Team 2
Hà Nội T&T (Vietnam)	1–0	(Hong Kong) Kitchee
Chonburi (Thailand)	3–2 (a.e.t.)	(Myanmar) Yangon United
Shandong Luneng (China)	6–0	(India) Mohun Bagan
Muangthong United (Thailand)	0–0 (a.e.t.) (3–0 p)	(Malaysia) Johor Darul Ta'zim

=== AFC Cup ===
==== Group stage ====
Pos	Team	Pld	W	D	L	GF	GA	GD	Pts	Qualification	MOH	SCA	YAN	MAZ
1	(India) Mohun Bagan	6	3	2	1	14	9	+5	11	Knockout stage	—	0–3	3–2	5–2
2	(Hong Kong) South China	6	3	0	3	9	9	0	9	Knockout stage	0–4	—	2–1	2–0
3	(Myanmar) Yangon United	6	2	2	2	10	10	0	8		1–1	2–1	—	3–2
4	(Maldives) Maziya	6	1	2	3	8	13	−5	5		1–1	2–1	1–1	—

Source: AFC

==== Round of 16 ====
In the round of 16, the winners of one group played the runners-up of another group from the same zone, with the group winners hosting the match.

Team 1	Score	Team 2
West Zone
Al-Ahed (Lebanon)	4–0	(Syria) Al-Wahda
Al-Quwa Al-Jawiya (Iraq)	2–1	(Jordan) Al-Wehdat
Naft Al-Wasat (Iraq)	0–1	(Syria) Al-Jaish
Al-Muharraq (Bahrain)	1–0	(Jordan) Al-Faisaly
East Zone
Ceres (Philippines)	0–1 (a.e.t.)	(Hong Kong) South China
Mohun Bagan (India)	1–2 (a.e.t.)	(Singapore) Tampines Rovers
Kitchee (Hong Kong)	2–3	(India) Bengaluru
Johor Darul Ta'zim (Malaysia)	7–2	(Philippines) Kaya

=== Federation Cup ===
==== Quarter finals ====
Team 1	Agg.	Team 2	1st leg	2nd leg
Bengaluru FC	3–5	Aizawl	1–2	2–3
Sporting Goa	2–0	Mumbai	1–0	1–0
East Bengal	3–4 (a.e.t.)	Shillong Lajong	1–2	2–2 (a.e.t.)
Mohun Bagan	7–2	Salgaocar	3–2	4–0

==== Semi-finals ====
Team 1	Agg.	Team 2	1st leg	2nd leg
Sporting Goa	2–2 (a)	Aizawl	0–0	2–2
Shillong Lajong	0–5	Mohun Bagan	0–5	0–0

==== Final ====
Team 1	Score	Team 2
Mohun Bagan	5–0	Aizawl

=== Results summary ===
Overall								Home						Away					
Pld	W	D	L	GF	GA	GD	Pts	W	D	L	GF	GA	GD	W	D	L	GF	GA	GD
40	20	12	8	83	45	+38	72	15	6	4	62	23	+39	5	6	4	21	22	−1

== Matches ==
Win Draw Loss

=== Calcutta Football League ===
9 August 2015 1	Mohun Bagan	0–0	Mohammedan	Barasat
15:30 IST		Report		Stadium: Barasat Stadium

13 August 2015 2	Mohun Bagan	0–0	SAI Darjeeling	Barasat
15:30 IST	Sukhen (yellow card) 62'; Souvik (yellow card) 71'; Kotal (yellow card) 82'	Report		Stadium: Barasat Stadium

16 August 2015 3	Mohun Bagan	5–2	Southern Samity	Barasat
15:30 IST	Yusa 19', 31'; Dudu 22', 37', 55'; Kotal (yellow card) 35'; Lalkamal (yellow card) 45+2'; Souvik (yellow card) 87'	Report	Snehasish 39' (pen.); Taurus 61'	Stadium: Barasat Stadium

21 August 2015 4	Mohun Bagan	3–0	Bengal Nagpur Railway	Barasat
15:30 IST	Yusa 68', 87'; Dudu 77'	Report		Stadium: Barasat Stadium

25 August 2015 5	Mohun Bagan	0–1	Army XI	Barasat
15:30 IST	Bhargav (yellow card) 56'	Report	P.Jain 50'	Stadium: Barasat Stadium

28 August 2015 6	Mohun Bagan	0–0	Tollygunge Agragami	Barasat
15:30 IST	Katsumi (yellow card) 90'	Report		Stadium: Barasat Stadium

3 September 2015 8	Mohun Bagan	4–1	Police A.C.	Barasat
15:30 IST	Lalkamal 26'; Kean 45+1', 85'; Dudu 76'	Report	Brown 15'	Stadium: Barasat Stadium

6 September 2015 9	East Bengal	4–0	Mohun Bagan	Kolkata
15:30 IST	Do-dong 2', 36'; Rafique 82'; Saumik 90+5'	Report	Dudu (yellow card) 19' (yellow-red card) 50'; Balmuchu (yellow card) 36'; Lalkamal (yellow card) 37' (yellow-red card) 90+4'	Stadium: Salt Lake Stadium

9 September 2015 10	Mohun Bagan	4–1	Kalighat M.S.	Barasat
15:30 IST	Yusa 2'; Ram 27'; Azhar 33'; Moula 65'	Report	S.Dutta 17'	Stadium: Barasat Stadium

14 September 2015 7	Mohun Bagan	0–0	Aryan	Barasat
15:30 IST		Report		Stadium: Barasat Stadium

=== I-League ===
9 January 2016 1	Mohun Bagan	3–1	Aizawl	Barasat
16:30 IST	Glen 5', 22'; Balwant 29'; Katsumi (yellow card) 37'; Souvik (yellow card) 49'; Kotal (yellow card) 89'	Report	Kotal 17' (o.g.); Lalruatthara (yellow card) 81'	Stadium: Barasat Stadium; Referee: C.R.Sree Krishna

16 January 2016 2	Mohun Bagan	4–2	Salgaocar	Barasat
16:30 IST	Katsumi 9'; Glen 27' (pen.); Luciano 33'; Balwant 48'; Balwant (yellow card) 49'; Luciano (yellow card) 90+4'	Report	Duffy 69'; Gurjinder 86'	Stadium: Barasat Stadium; Referee: U.Bora

23 January 2016 3	Mohun Bagan	1–1	East Bengal	Kolkata
16:30 IST	Glen 76'; Pronay (yellow card) 55'; Luciano (yellow card) 72'; D.Singh (yellow card) 74'	Report	Ranti 63'; Arnab (yellow card) 53'; Bheke (yellow card) 88'	Stadium: Salt Lake Stadium; Attendance: 62,342; Referee: A.Rowan

30 January 2016 4	DSK Shivajians	0–2	Mohun Bagan	Pune
17:30 IST	Adnaik (yellow card) 50'; L.Ralte (yellow card) 30' (yellow-red card) 75'	Report	Norde 12', 53'; Pronay (yellow card) 27'; Raju (yellow card) 38'	Stadium: Balewadi Sports Complex; Referee: A.Rowan

10 February 2016 6	Mumbai	0–0	Mohun Bagan	Mumbai
19:05 IST	Pratik (yellow card) 21'; Pradeep (yellow card) 58'; A.Dias (yellow card) 73'; Asif K. (yellow card) 75'; A.Mehta (yellow card) 90+3'	Report	Luciano (yellow card) 54'; B.Singh (yellow card) 77'	Stadium: Cooperage Football Stadium; Referee: B.Balasubramanium

13 February 2016 7	Bengaluru FC	0–2	Mohun Bagan	Bengaluru
19:05 IST	Osano (yellow card) 26'; Chhuantea (yellow card) 45+2' (yellow-red card) 61'	Report	Jeje 73'; Norde 90+4'; Pronay (yellow card) 13'; Glen (yellow card) 90+1'	Stadium: Sree Kanteerava Stadium; Referee: A.Meetei

17 February 2016 5	Mohun Bagan	1–1	Shillong Lajong	Barasat
19:05 IST	Jeje 59'	Report	K.Singh 30'; Z.Ralte (yellow card) 13'; Shadap (yellow card) 45+2'; Penn (yellow card) 75'	Stadium: Barasat Stadium; Referee: P.Singh

20 February 2016 8	Mohun Bagan	1–0	Sporting Goa	Barasat
16:30 IST	Katsumi 73'; Pronay (yellow card) 10'; Luciano (yellow card) 20'	Report	Denson (yellow card) 87'; F.Cardozo (yellow card) 88'	Stadium: Barasat Stadium; Referee: U.Bora

27 February 2016 9	Salgaocar	1–3	Mohun Bagan	Vasco
16:30 IST	Duffy 71', (yellow card) 45+1'; Scott (yellow card) 22'; G.Oliveira (yellow card) 70' (yellow-red card) 81'; Augustin (yellow card) 76'	Report	Jeje 13'; Glen 30', 45+1'; Raju (yellow card) 62'; B.Singh (yellow card) 81'; Kingshuk (yellow card) 90'	Stadium: Tilak Maidan; Referee: A.Rowan

1 March 2016 10	Sporting Goa	1–1	Mohun Bagan	Margao
19:05 IST	Raju 39' (o.g.); F.Cardozo (yellow card) 72'; S.Bose (yellow card) 87'	Report	Brandon 28'; Pronay (yellow card) 58'	Stadium: Jawaharlal Nehru Stadium; Referee: C.R.Sree Krishna

13 March 2016 12	Mohun Bagan	2–0	Mumbai	Barasat
19:05 IST	Katsumi 34'; Norde 62'; Pronay (yellow card) 48'	Report	Arata (yellow card) 37'; Pratik (yellow card) 45+1'; Kozawa (yellow card) 60'; A.Mehta (yellow card) 61'	Stadium: Barasat Stadium; Referee: R.Venkatesh

26 March 2016 11	Aizawl	2–1	Mohun Bagan	Aizawl
14:00 IST	Alfred 3'; Lalchawnkima 56' (pen.)	Report	Glen 24'; D.Singh (yellow card) 55'; Katsumi (yellow card) 90+3'	Stadium: Rajiv Gandhi Stadium; Referee: P.Singh

2 April 2016 13	East Bengal	2–1	Mohun Bagan	Siliguri
16:30 IST	Do-dong 40' (pen.), 75', (yellow card) 75'; Bello (yellow card) 45+1'; Sehnaj (yellow card) 90+4'	Report	Katsumi 83'; Luciano (yellow card) 38'; Kotal (yellow card) 84'; Pronay (yellow card) 87'	Stadium: Kanchenjunga Stadium; Referee: M.V.Santosh Kumar

5 April 2016 14	Shillong Lajong	2–2	Mohun Bagan	Shillong
16:30 IST	Uilliams 40', 90+5'; Nim Dorjee (yellow card) 73'	Report	Jeje 18'; Katsumi 77'; Kotal (yellow card) 39'; Kingshuk (yellow card) 47'	Stadium: Jawaharlal Nehru Stadium; Referee: B.Balasubramanium

9 April 2016 15	Mohun Bagan	3–3	DSK Shivajians	Barasat
19:05 IST	Glen 26', 45'; Norde 41'; Pronay (yellow card) 20'; Luciano (yellow card) 54'	Report	Quero 30', 34'; Dipanda 75'; Jhingan (yellow card) 32'; M.Singh (yellow card) 56'	Stadium: Barasat Stadium; Referee: T.Nagvenkar

23 April 2016 16	Mohun Bagan	5–0	Bengaluru FC	Siliguri
19:05 IST	Glen 8', 66'; Rodrigues 21'; Luciano 23'; Azhar 28'	Report	K.Pereira (yellow card) 33' (yellow-red card) 51'; Malsawmzuala (yellow card) 44'	Stadium: Kanchenjunga Stadium; Referee: A.Meetei

=== AFC Champions League ===
27 January 2016 Preliminary Round 1	Mohun Bagan (India)	3–1	(Singapore) Tampines Rovers	Kolkata
19:00 IST	Jeje 6'; Glen 42'; Katsumi 84'; Pronay (yellow card) 31'; Kingshuk (yellow card) 43'; Debjit (yellow card) 85'; A.Das (yellow card) 90+2'	Report	Hanapi 44'; K.Jun (yellow card) 20'; N.Rahman (yellow card) 32'	Stadium: Salt Lake Stadium; Attendance: 12,640; Referee: Jarred Gillett (Australia)

2 February 2016 Preliminary Round 2	Shandong Luneng (China)	6–0	(India) Mohun Bagan	Jinan
15:00 CST	Montillo 23'; Tardelli 40'; Yang 55', 68'; Zheng 76'; Wang 88'	Report		Stadium: Jinan Olympic Sports Center Stadium; Attendance: 15,109; Referee: Mohanad Qasim Eesee Sarray (Iraq)

=== AFC Cup ===
24 February 2016 Group Stage	Mohun Bagan (India)	5–2	(Maldives) Maziya	Guwahati
19:00 IST	Norde 19'; Jeje 33', 69'; Glen 35', 72'; B.Singh (yellow card) 85'; Luciano (yellow card) 90+3'	Report	Imaaz 61'; Raju 77' (o.g.); Easa (yellow card) 4'; Mohamed (yellow card) 18'; Nashid (yellow card) 87'	Stadium: Indira Gandhi Athletic Stadium; Attendance: 5,322; Referee: Jumpei Iida (Japan)

9 March 2016 Group Stage	South China (Hong Kong)	0–4	(India) Mohun Bagan	Hong Kong
20:00 HKT	Hok Hei (yellow card) 11'; Runqiu (yellow card) 13' (yellow-red card) 16'	Report	Rodrigues 15'; Norde 39'; Glen 44'; Jeje 83'; S.Ghosh (yellow card) 84'	Stadium: Mong Kok Stadium; Attendance: 1,937; Referee: Masoud Tufayelieh (Syria)

16 March 2016 Group Stage	Mohun Bagan (India)	3–2	(Myanmar) Yangon United	Guwahati
19:00 IST	Norde 10'; Jeje 21', 66'; Pronay (yellow card) 74'	Report	Marcelo 34' (pen.), 64'; Lin (yellow card) 75'; Paing (yellow card) 89'	Stadium: Indira Gandhi Athletic Stadium; Attendance: 2,748; Referee: Khamis Al-Kuwari (Qatar)

13 April 2016 Group Stage	Yangon United (Myanmar)	1–1	(India) Mohun Bagan	Yangon
16:00 MMT	Adilson 26'; Lwin (yellow card) 83'	Report	Glen 42'; Raju (yellow card) 29'; Jeje (yellow card) 52'; Luciano (yellow card) 60'	Stadium: Thuwunna Stadium; Attendance: 590; Referee: Yu Ming-hsun (Chinese Taipei)

27 April 2016 Group Stage	Maziya (Maldives)	1–1	(India) Mohun Bagan	Malé
16:00 MVT	Abdulla 65'; Dinev (yellow card) 7'; Habeeb (yellow card) 59'	Report	Jeje 90+3'; Balmuchu (yellow card) 16'; B.Singh (yellow card) 21'; Glen (yellow card) 73'	Stadium: National Football Stadium; Attendance: 400; Referee: Wang Di (China)

11 May 2016 Group Stage	Mohun Bagan (India)	0–3	(Hong Kong) South China	Guwahati
18:30 IST	S.Ghosh (yellow card) 27'	Report	Chung 19'; Griffiths 24'; Mahama 33'	Stadium: Indira Gandhi Athletic Stadium; Attendance: 472; Referee: Yaqoob Abdul Baki (Oman)

24 May 2016 Round of 16	Mohun Bagan (India)	1–2 (a.e.t.)	(Singapore) Tampines Rovers	Guwahati
19:00 IST	B.Singh 72'; Raju (yellow card) 54'; Arnab (yellow card) 114'; D.Singh (yellow card) 117'	Report	Webb 63'; Yunos 116'; Hamzah (yellow card) 51' (yellow-red card) 54'; Mukhtar (yellow card) 79'; Pennant (yellow card) 79'; Sujad (yellow card) 108'	Stadium: Indira Gandhi Athletic Stadium; Attendance: 282; Referee: Turki Al-Khudhayr (Saudi Arabia)

=== Federation Cup ===
2 May 2016 Quarter finals	Salgaocar	2–3	Mohun Bagan	Vasco
16:30 IST	Scott 26'; Mbarga 30'	Report	Jeje 1', 86'; A.Das 77'; Pronay (yellow card) 62'	Stadium: Tilak Maidan

5 May 2016 Quarter finals	Mohun Bagan	4–0 (7–2 agg.)	Salgaocar	Barasat
19:00 IST	Katsumi 25'; Norde 45+1', 52'; Jeje 90+4'; Kingshuk (yellow card) 12'	Report		Stadium: Barasat Stadium

8 May 2016 Semi-finals	Mohun Bagan	5–0	Shillong Lajong	Barasat
19:00 IST	Jeje 40', 51', 56'; B.Singh 45'; Azhar 86'	Report		Stadium: Barasat Stadium

14 May 2016 Semi-finals	Shillong Lajong	0–0 (0–5 agg.)	Mohun Bagan	Shillong
17:00 IST		Report		Stadium: Jawaharlal Nehru Stadium

21 May 2016 Final	Mohun Bagan	5–0	Aizawl	Guwahati
19:00 IST	Norde 48'; D.Singh 59'; Jeje 73', 88'; B.Singh 83'	Report		Stadium: Indira Gandhi Athletic Stadium

== Notes ==
1. Mohun Bagan were deducted 3 points in the match with Tollygunge Agragami and Tollygunge Agragami were awarded 3 points as Mohun Bagan played without the mandatory u-23 player on the field for a few minutes in injury time. The result of the match was reversed by IFA to 0–0 and all the goals scored in the match by both the teams were declared void, but the cards shown were recorded. The match was counted as a loss for Mohun Bagan in the final league standings.
