= 2016 Indian Federation Cup final =

Mohun Bagan	Aizawl
5	0
- Date: 21 May 2016
- Venue: Indira Gandhi Stadium, Guwahati
- Man of the Match: Jeje Lalpekhlua (Mohun Bagan)
- Referee: C. R. Srikrishna
- Weather: Rain, cloudy sky 26°C (79°F); 88% humidity

The 2016 Indian Federation Cup final was a football match played on 21 May 2016 at the Indira Gandhi Stadium in Guwahati between Aizawl and Mohun Bagan.

Mohun Bagan won the final by defeating Aizawl 5–0 with a brace from Jeje Lalpekhlua and goals each from Sony Norde, Dhanachandra Singh and Bikramjit Singh. This was a record 14th time that Mohun Bagan won the tournament, making them the most successful club in the history of the competition.

The match was telecast live on TEN 2.

== Background ==
Mohun Bagan were playing a record 19th Federation Cup final. They had previously won 13, a record in itself. However, their most recent victory was way back in the 2008 edition against Dempo by a margin of 1–0. Their most recent defeat in the final was in the 2010 edition, where they lost 1–0 to arch rivals East Bengal.

It was Aizawl's debut in the Federation Cup final. The team had been relegated from the top division of I-League and were looking to create history by becoming the first ever team from the North-East to win the title.

Mohun Bagan and Aizawl had played twice during the season's I-League. While Mohun Bagan won their home match, it was the highlanders who spoiled the party for Mohun Bagan in the latter's away game. On 9 January 2016, Mohun Bagan won the opening match of the I-League 3–1 at the Barasat Stadium, with a brace from Cornell Glen and a solitary goal from Balwant. Aizawl's only goal was a result of an own goal from Bagan right back, Pritam Kotal. In the return leg encounter at the Rajiv Gandhi Stadium, Aizawl it was the highlanders who brought down high flying Mohun Bagan to ground with a 2–1 victory over the Kolkata club. Alfred Jaryan opened the scoring for the highlanders, while Cornell Glen equalised for Mohun Bagan. In the second half it was Lalchawnkima who converted from the spot to give Aizawl a much cherished victory.

== Road to the final ==
The 2015–16 Indian Federation Cup, also known as 2015–16 Hero Federation Cup due to sponsorship reasons, was the 37th edition of the Federation Cup, the main national football cup competition in India. The tournament was held from 30 April 2016 to 21 May 2016. The top 8 teams from the 2015–16 I-League participated in the tournament.

=== Mohun Bagan ===
Round	Leg	Opposition	Score
QF	Away	Salgaocar	3–2
QF	Home	Salgaocar	4–0
SF	Home	Shillong Lajong	5–0
SF	Away	Shillong Lajong	0–0

Mohun Bagan had reached the finals 18 times previously and made their 19th appearance in the final in the 2015–16 Federation Cup. Mohun Bagan kicked off their campaign on a positive note when they defeated Salgaocar in a quarter final away encounter. Jeje Lalpekhlua opened the scoring for the Mariners within 30 seconds from kick-off as he headed in a Subhash Singh cross. Bagan however found themselves down 2–1 at the end of the first half, thanks to 26th and 30th-minute strikes from Martin Scott and Calvin Mbarga respectively. In the second half, substitute Abhishek Das drew Mohun Bagan level as he netted in a goal in the 77th minute from a Katsumi Yusa pass, minutes after he was introduced as a substitute. In the 86th minute, it was Jeje Lalpekhlua who sealed the fate of the match with a vicious half volley past the goalkeeper Karanjit Singh to put Mohun Bagan 3–2 ahead. The match ended with the same scoreline and Bagan had 3 crucial away goals in their kitty giving them a lot of confidence before the home leg.

In the return leg of the quarter final tie, the Mariners demolished Salgaocar 4–0 riding on a brace from Haitian playmaker Sony Norde and goals from Katsumi Yusa and Jeje Lalpekhlua. It was Katsumi Yusa who started the scoring in the 25th minute reaching at the end of a Sony Norde cross and tapping it easily into an open net. Minutes away from the half time whistle Sony Norde scored his first of the match and the tournament as he beautifully cut in from the left and put the ball in the net past the goalkeeper to ensure that Bagan went into the lemon break with a 3-goal advantage on aggregate. The Green and Maroon brigade started off the second half where they ended the first. It was a piece of individual brilliance by Haitian playmaker Sony Norde as he went past three Salgaocar defenders and put the ball in the net with relative ease to score his second of the night. In the final minute of the match, a beautiful through ball from Cornell Glen saw Jeje Lalpekhlua tap it in with utter ease to put the icing on the cake of the Green and Maroon victory.

Next, Mohun Bagan were up against a fairly confident Shillong Lajong side who had entered the semi-finals upsetting Kolkata giants East Bengal 4–3 on aggregate. The first 30 minutes of the semi-final was a closely contested tie. It took a moment of individual brilliance from Sony Norde in the 40th minute to open the scoring for Bagan. His long range effort rebounded off Lajong goalkeeper Vishal Kaith, and Jeje Lalpekhlua grabbed onto the opportunity as he toed the ball into the net. This goal opened the scoring floodgates for Mohun Bagan. In the final stages of the first half Bikramjit Singh scored a screamer from a Cornell Glen pass to put Mohun Bagan ahead 2–0. After the restart Jeje Lalpekhlua completed his hat-trick by scoring in the 51st and 56th minute. At the fag end of the match young star Azharuddin Mallick put the final nail in the Lajong coffin to secure a comprehensive 5–0 victory for the Mariners.

Mohun Bagan had almost secured a place in the final as they went into the semi-final away encounter with a 5–0 advantage against Shillong Lajong. This however did not deter the Bagan gaffer, Sanjoy Sen from fielding his first side in the match. The Mariners however lacked motivation and played a defensive game. They failed to create significant positive moves as their opponents found it easier going in the centre of the field. Shillong Lajong had their best chance of the match when Brazilian striker Fábio Pena found an open net in front of him but still ended up hitting the woodwork. The match was fairly uneventful and ended a 0–0 stalemate guaranteeing Mohun Bagan progress on basis of the 5–0 aggregate scoreline.

=== Aizawl ===
Round	Leg	Opposition	Score
QF	Home	Bengaluru FC	2–1
QF	Away	Bengaluru FC	3–2
SF	Home	Sporting Goa	0–0
SF	Away	Sporting Goa	2–2

Aizawl had a dream run in the Federation Cup before they made it to their first ever final. In the quarter final encounter, they were first up at home against the recently crowned I-League champions Bengaluru FC. Bengaluru FC opened the scoring in the 15th minute thanks to a strike from midfield general Eugeneson Lyngdoh. Aizawl however did not give up hope and drew level terms in the 38th minute from an Alfred Jaryan strike. In the final minutes of regulation time, it was striker Joel Sunday who gave Aizawl the elusive winning goal. This result meant that although Bengaluru FC had an away goal in their kitty, it was Aizawl who walked away the stronger, being a goal to the good before the return leg quarter final encounter.

The return leg match at the Sree Kanteerava Stadium started with Bengaluru FC needing a 1–0 victory to guarantee a place in the semi-finals. It was however, the visitors Aizawl who drew first blood from a Joel Sunday goal in the 26th minute. Bengaluru FC however were not too late to strike back. In the 28th minute, C.K. Vineeth found himself at the end of a Keegan Pereira pass and the Keralite did not make any mistake in finding the back of the net. In the 38th minute however, the agony for the hosts mounted as Joel Sunday scored a scorcher of a goal to give Aizawl a 2–1 lead with 2 away goals, 1 more than Bengaluru FC. After the restart, post the lemon break, the fate of the match was sealed by the Aizawl captain David Lalrinmuana as he scored from a direct free-kick to give the visitors an almost unassailable 3–1 lead (5–2 on aggregate). Bengaluru FC pressed hard in the final half hour and did manage to pull one back through a penalty goal from Indian striker Sunil Chettri. However, that proved to be too little too late as the visitors booked their spot in the semi-final with a 3–2 victory on the night and an aggregate scoreline of 5–3 in their favour.

Aizawl were up against Sporting Goa in the semi-final encounter at home in the first leg. The match saw both teams playing safe and ended 0–0 leaving the teams' fate resting on the return leg encounter at the Jawaharlal Nehru Stadium, Goa. The match produced a few sporadic chances, most of which fell to the north eastern side. The best chance of the match came in the 53rd minute when captain David Lalrinmuana's free-kick found Emmanuel Chigozie in the box, but the latter failed to break the deadlock. In the 81st minute, Sporting Goa custodian Arindam Bhattacharya pulled off a brilliant save to deny the hosts the lead.

The fate of the semi-finalists rested on the return leg encounter in Goa. The match started off with nerves on both sides forcing rookie mistakes in both camps. It was however the visitors Aizawl, who drew first blood, all thanks to their wonderman Joel Sunday who put them ahead in the 37th minute. The 1–0 lead meant Aizawl had an away goal advantage and Sporting Goa would have to score two to progress into the final. The Goans however got their rescue act in place, seconds away from the lemon break whistle. A Sumit Passi header found the back of the net to draw Sporting Clube de Goa to level terms. The visitors however made the Goan recovery more difficult after the referee awarded a penalty to the highlanders as their captain David Lalrinmuana was tripped in the box by a Sporting Goa defender. Lalchawnkima made no mistake in finding the net from the penalty spot to give Aizawl a 2–1 lead. In the 80th minute however, a butter-fingers moment from Aizawl goalkeeper Soram Poirei saw him push an easy shot right onto Glan Martins' boots. The forward made no mistake in scoring from close range to draw the Goans 2–2. Sporting Goa however needed another goal to advance to the final. They had their best chance in injury time, but Sumit Passi failed to tap in an easy ball into an open net. The ending however was not very happy for the visitors. Aizawl captain David Lalrinmuana was given the marching orders by the referee when he tried to delay a free-kick from being taken. This made the vital midfielder unavailable for the all-important final encounter. The match finished 2–2 on the night and the same on aggregate seeing Aizawl go through to the final having two more away goals than their opponents.

== Match details ==
21 May 2016
19:00 IST

Mohun Bagan	5–0	Aizawl
Norde 48'; D. Singh 59'; Jeje 73', 88'; B. Singh 83'	Report

Indira Gandhi Stadium, Guwahati
Referee: C. R. Srikrishna

Mohun Bagan	Aizawl

GK	24	(India) Debjit Majumder
CB	4	(India) Kingshuk Debnath
CB	5	(India) Dhanachandra Singh
CB	10	(Japan) Katsumi Yusa (c)
RM	12	(India) Pritam Kotal
CM	11	(India) Pronay Halder	(substituted off) 90'
CM	6	(India) Bikramjit Singh
LM	2	(Brazil) Luciano Sabrosa
AM	16	(Haiti) Sony Norde
CF	13	(Trinidad and Tobago) Cornell Glen	(substituted off) 87'
CF	7	(India) Jeje Lalpekhlua
Substitutes:
GK	1	(India) Arnab Das Sharma
DF	3	(India) Raju Gaikwad
DF	21	(India) Sanjay Balmuchu
DF	28	(India) Abhishek Das
MF	23	(India) Souvik Chakraborty	(substituted on) 90'
MF	42	(India) Lenny Rodrigues
FW	35	(India) Azharuddin Mallick	(substituted on) 87'
Head Coach:
(India) Sanjoy Sen

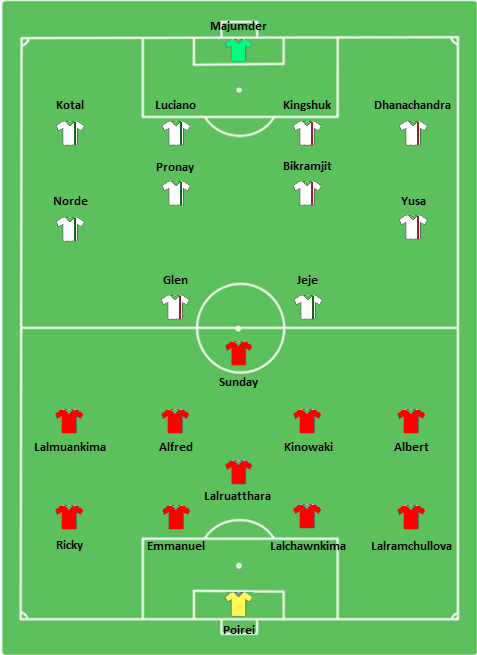

GK	1	(India) Soram Poirei
RB	27	(India) Lalramchullova
CB	31	(India) Lalchawnkima
CB	4	(Nigeria) Emmanuel Chigozie	(yellow card) 20'
LB	26	(India) Ricky Lallawmawma
RM	11	(India) Albert Zohmingmawia
CM	3	(Japan) Yuta Kinowaki
CM	20	(Liberia) Alfred Jaryan (c)
LM	39	(India) Lalruatthara	(yellow card) 52'	(substituted off) 69'
CF	25	(Nigeria) Joel Sunday		(substituted off) 90'
CF	19	(India) H Lalmuankima		(substituted off) 66'
Substitutes:
GK	21	(India) Zothanmawia
DF	18	(India) Imanuel Lalthazuala
DF	24	(India) Lalthakima
MF	8	(India) H Lalbiakthanga
MF	13	(India) Lalmuanzova		(substituted on) 69'
FW	16	(India) F Lalrinpuia		(substituted on) 90'
FW	30	(India) Brandon Vanlalremdika		(substituted on) 66'
Not playing:
MF	17	(India) David Lalrinmuana
Head Coach:
(India) Jahar Das

Man of the match

- Jeje Lalpekhlua (Mohun Bagan)

Match rules

- 90 minutes.
- 30 minutes of extra-time if necessary.
- Penalty shoot-out if scores still level.
- Seven named substitutes.
- Maximum of three substitutions.
