= 2015–16 Indian Federation Cup =

37th edition of the Federation Cup

2016 Federation Cup
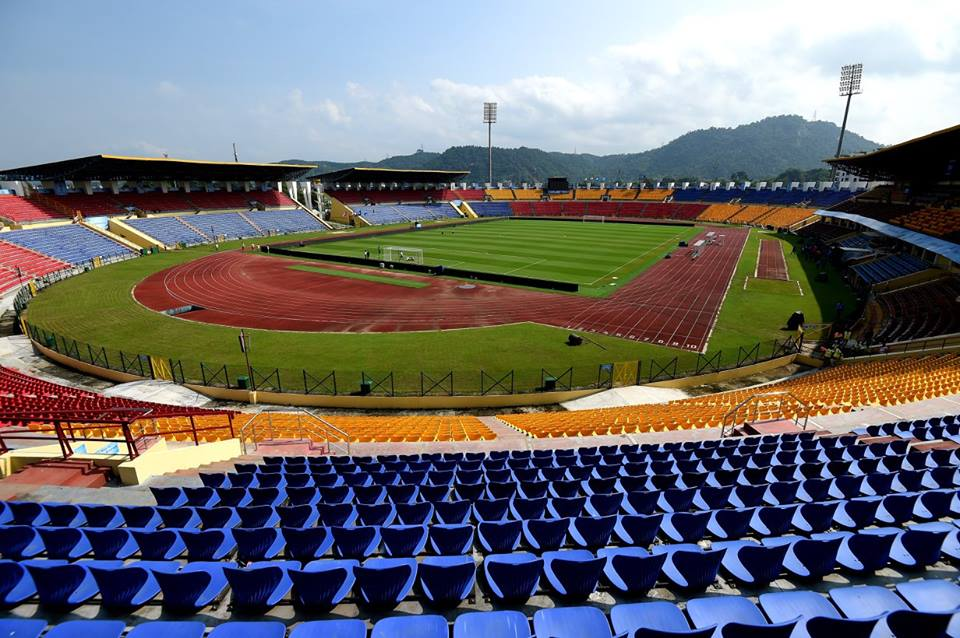
- Indira Gandhi Stadium hosted the final on 21 May 2016

Tournament details
- Country: India
- Dates: 30 April–21 May 2016
- Teams: 8

Final positions
- Champions: Mohun Bagan (14th title)
- Runners-up: Aizawl
- AFC Cup: Mohun Bagan

Tournament statistics
- Matches played: 13
- Goals scored: 40 (3.08 per match)
- Top goal scorer(s): Jeje Lalpekhlua (8 goals)

Awards
- Best player: Jeje Lalpekhlua

The 2015–16 Indian Federation Cup (also known as Hero Federation Cup due to sponsorship reasons) was the 37th edition of the Federation Cup, the main national football cup competition in India. The tournament was held from 30 April 2016 to 21 May 2016. Top 8 teams from 2015–16 I-League participated in the tournament. Ten Sports Network, the Official Broadcaster of Hero Federation Cup 2016 telecast only the Semi-finals and the Final match while Knockout stage matches were streamed live on I-league website.

Bengaluru FC were the reigning champions of the Federation Cup, having won the tournament in 2015. However, they were upset in the quarter-finals by 8th placed Aizawl.

All matches except the final were played as two-legged tie on home and away basis, with the application of the away goals rule. The final was played as a single match at the Indira Gandhi Stadium in Guwahati.

The final was played between Mohun Bagan and Aizawl on 21 May 2016. Mohun Bagan defeated Aizawl 5–0 to clinch their record 14th title, making them the most successful club in the history of the competition.

== Background ==
In 2015, All India Football Federation decided to scrap Federation Cup due to congested calendar with I-League and Indian Super League occupying a large part of the calendar, but after Asian Football Confederation mandated that a club must play 18 matches in the season, AIFF decided to revive the tournament.

== Teams ==
Following teams have qualified for Federation Cup:

- Bengaluru FC
- Mohun Bagan
- East Bengal
- Sporting Goa
- Mumbai
- Shillong Lajong
- Salgaocar
- Aizawl

== Rounds and dates ==
The tournament will be played between top 8 teams of 2015–16 I-League as the knock-out tournament on home and away basis.

Round	Match date(s)	Number of fixtures	Teams
Quarter finals	30 April/ 1 May/ 2 May 2016 – 3 May/ 4 May/ 5 May 2016	8	8
Semi-finals	8 May/ 10 May 2016 – 14 May/ 15 May 2016	4	4
Final	21 May 2016	1	2

== Bracket ==
Quarter-finals
1	Bengaluru FC	1	2	3
8	Aizawl	2	3	5
4	Sporting Goa	1	1	2
5	Mumbai	0	0	0
3	East Bengal	1	2	3
6	Shillong Lajong (aet)	2	2	4
2	Mohun Bagan	3	4	7
7	Salgaocar	2	0	2

Semi-finals
8	Aizawl (a)	0	2	2
4	Sporting Goa	0	2	2
6	Shillong Lajong	0	0	0
2	Mohun Bagan	5	0	5

Final
8	Aizawl	0
2	Mohun Bagan	5

== Quarter-finals ==
30 April 2016
15:00 IST

Aizawl	2–1	Bengaluru FC
Jaryan 38'; Sunday 90'	Report	Lyngdoh 15'

Rajiv Gandhi Stadium, Aizawl
1 May 2016
17:00 IST

Shillong Lajong	2–1	East Bengal
K.Singh 33'; Fábio 62'	Report	Do Dong 44'

Jawaharlal Nehru Stadium, Shillong
1 May 2016
19:00 IST

Mumbai	0–1	Sporting Goa
	Report	Passi 90'

Cooperage Football Stadium, Mumbai
2 May 2016
16:30 IST

Salgaocar	2–3	Mohun Bagan
Scott 26'; Mbarga 30'	Report	Jeje 1', 86'; A. Das 77'

Tilak Maidan, Vasco

3 May 2016
21:00 IST

Bengaluru FC	2–3	Aizawl
Vineeth 28'; Chhetri 74' (pen.)	Report	Sunday 26', 37'; Lalrinmuana 49'

Sree Kanteerava Stadium, Bengaluru
4 May 2016
16:30 IST

Sporting Goa	1–0	Mumbai
S.Bose 46'	Report

Jawaharlal Nehru Stadium, Margao
4 May 2016
16:30 IST

East Bengal	2–2 (a.e.t.)	Shillong Lajong
Ranti 23'; Ralte 37'	Report	Fábio 17'; Uilliams 114'

Barasat Stadium, Barasat
5 May 2016
19:00 IST

Mohun Bagan	4–0	Salgaocar
Katsumi 25'; Norde 45+1', 52'; Jeje 90+4'	Report

Barasat Stadium, Barasat

== Semi-finals ==
8 May 2016
19:00 IST

Mohun Bagan	5–0	Shillong Lajong
Jeje 40', 51', 56'; B.Singh 45'; Azharuddin 86'	Report

Barasat Stadium, Barasat
10 May 2016
15:00 IST

Aizawl	0–0	Sporting Goa
	Report

Rajiv Gandhi Stadium, Aizawl

14 May 2016
17:00 IST

Shillong Lajong	0–0	Mohun Bagan
	Report

Jawaharlal Nehru Stadium, Shillong
15 May 2016
19:00 IST

Sporting Goa	2–2	Aizawl
Sunday 37'; Lalchawnkima 60' (pen.)	Report	Passi 45+2'; Martins 80'

Jawaharlal Nehru Stadium, Margao

== Final ==
21 May 2016
19:00 IST

Mohun Bagan	5–0	Aizawl
Norde 48'; D. Singh 59'; Jeje 73', 88'; B. Singh 83'	Report

Indira Gandhi Stadium, Guwahati

== Goalscorers ==
8 Goals:

- (India) Jeje Lalpekhlua (Mohun Bagan)

4 Goals:

- (Nigeria) Joel Sunday (Aizawl)

3 Goals:

- (Haiti) Sony Norde (Mohun Bagan)

2 Goals:

- (India) Bikramjit Singh (Mohun Bagan)
- (Brazil) Fábio Pena (Shillong Lajong)
- (India) Sumit Passi (Sporting Goa)

1 Goal:

- (India) Abhishek Das (Mohun Bagan)
- (Liberia) Alfred Jaryan (Aizawl)
- (India) Azharuddin Mallick (Mohun Bagan)
- (Cameroon) Calvin Mbarga (Salgaocar)
- (India) C.K. Vineeth (Bengaluru FC)
- (India) David Lalrinmuana (Aizawl)
- (India) Dhanachandra Singh (Mohun Bagan)
- (South Korea) Do Dong-hyun (East Bengal)
- (India) Eugeneson Lyngdoh (Bengaluru FC)
- (India) Glan Martins (Sporting Goa)
- (Japan) Katsumi Yusa (Mohun Bagan)
- (India) Konsham Singh (Shillong Lajong)
- (India) Lalchawnkima (Aizawl)
- (India) Lalrindika Ralte (East Bengal)
- (Scotland) Martin Scott (Salgaocar)
- (Nigeria) Ranti Martins (East Bengal)
- (India) Subhasish Bose (Sporting Goa)
- (India) Sunil Chhetri (Bengaluru FC)
- (Brazil) Uilliams Bomfim Souza (Shillong Lajong)

=== Hat-tricks ===
Player	For	Against	Result	Date	Ref
(India) Jeje Lalpekhlua	Mohun Bagan	Shillong Lajong	5–0	8 May 2016	
