= 2015–16 in Indian football =

Football in India
- Season: 2015–16

Men's football
- I-League: Bengaluru
- I-League 2nd Div.: Dempo
- Federation Cup: Mohun Bagan

The 2015–16 season was the 128th competitive association football season in India.

== International ==
Pos	Team	Pld	W	D	L	GF	GA	GD	Pts	Qualification	Iran	Oman	Turkmenistan	Guam	India
1	Iran	8	6	2	0	26	3	+23	20	World Cup qualifying third round and Asian Cup	—	2–0	3–1	6–0	4–0
2	Oman	8	4	2	2	11	7	+4	14	Asian Cup qualifying third round	1–1	—	3–1	1–0	3–0
3	Turkmenistan	8	4	1	3	10	11	−1	13	Asian Cup qualifying third round	1–1	2–1	—	1–0	2–1
4	Guam	8	2	1	5	3	16	−13	7	Asian Cup qualifying third round	0–6	0–0	1–0	—	2–1
5	India	8	1	0	7	5	18	−13	3	Asian Cup qualifying play-off round	0–3 (Note: FIFA awarded Iran a 3–0 win as a result of India fielding the ineligible player Eugeneson Lyngdoh. The match initially ended 3–0 to Iran.)	1–2	1–2	1–0	—

Notes:

11 June 2015 World Cup Qualifier	India	1–2	Oman	Bangalore, India
19:00 UTC+5:30	Chhetri 26'	Report (FIFA); Report (AFC)	Said 1'; Al-Hosni 40' (pen.)	Stadium: Sree Kanteerava Stadium; Attendance: 19,312; Referee: Ko Hyung-jin (South Korea)

16 June 2015 World Cup Qualifier	Guam	2–1	India	Dededo, Guam
16:15 UTC+10	McDonald 37'; Nicklaw 62'	Report (FIFA); Report (AFC)	Chhetri 90+3'	Stadium: Guam F.A. National Training Center; Attendance: 3,277; Referee: Võ Minh Trí (Vietnam)

8 September 2015 World Cup Qualifier	India	0–3; Awarded (Note: FIFA awarded Iran a 3–0 win as a result of India fielding the ineligible player Eugeneson Lyngdoh. The match initially ended 3–0 to Iran.)	Iran	Bangalore, India
19:00 UTC+5:30		Report (FIFA); Report (AFC)	Azmoun 28'; Teymourian 46'; Taremi 49'	Stadium: Sree Kanteerava Stadium; Attendance: 14,500; Referee: Ammar Al-Jeneibi (United Arab Emirates)

8 October 2015 World Cup Qualifier	Turkmenistan	2–1	India	Ashgabat, Turkmenistan
18:00 UTC+5	Abylow 8'; Amanow 60'	Report (FIFA); Report (AFC)	Lalpekhlua 28'	Stadium: Köpetdag Stadium; Attendance: 20,100; Referee: Masoud Tufayelieh (Syria)

13 October 2015 World Cup Qualifier	Oman	3–0	India	Muscat, Oman
18:30 UTC+4	Mubarak 55'; Al-Muqbali 67', 84'	Report (FIFA); Report (AFC)		Stadium: Sultan Qaboos Sports Complex; Attendance: 11,000; Referee: Fahad Al-Marri (Qatar)

12 November 2015 World Cup Qualifier	India	1–0	Guam	Bangalore, India
19:00 UTC+5:30	R. Singh 10'	Report (FIFA); Report (AFC)		Stadium: Sree Kanteerava Stadium; Attendance: 6,277; Referee: Jarred Gillett (Australia)

24 March 2016 World Cup Qualifier	Iran	4–0	India	Tehran, Iran
19:00 UTC+4:30	Hajsafi 33' (pen.), 66' (pen.); Azmoun 61'; Jahanbakhsh 78'	Report (FIFA); Report (AFC)		Stadium: Azadi Stadium; Attendance: 29,160; Referee: Võ Minh Trí (Vietnam)

29 March 2016 World Cup Qualifier	India	1–2	Turkmenistan	Kochi, India
18:00 UTC+5:30	Jhingan 26'	Report (FIFA); Report (AFC)	Amanow 48'; Ataýew 70'	Stadium: Jawaharlal Nehru Stadium; Attendance: 3,111; Referee: Khamis Al-Marri (Qatar)

== League ==
=== Indian Super League ===
Pos	Team	Pld	W	D	L	GF	GA	GD	Pts	Qualification or relegation
1	Goa	14	7	4	3	29	20	+9	25	Advance to ISL Play-offs
2	Atlético de Kolkata	14	7	2	5	26	17	+9	23	Advance to ISL Play-offs
3	Chennaiyin (C)	14	7	1	6	25	15	+10	22	Advance to ISL Play-offs
4	Delhi Dynamos	14	6	4	4	18	20	−2	22	Advance to ISL Play-offs
5	NorthEast United	14	6	2	6	18	23	−5	20	
6	Mumbai City	14	4	4	6	16	26	−10	16	
7	Pune City	14	4	3	7	17	23	−6	15	
8	Kerala Blasters	14	3	4	7	22	27	−5	13	

Source: Indian Super League standings
Rules for classification: 1) points; 2) goal difference; 3) number of goals scored.
(C) Champions

==== Finals ====
Semi-Finals
1	Goa	0	3	3
4	Delhi Dynamos	1	0	1
2	Atlético de Kolkata	0	2	2
3	Chennaiyin	3	1	4

Final
1	Goa	2
3	Chennaiyin	3

=== I-League ===
==== Changes in the I-League ====
Teams promoted to the 2015–16 I-League:

- Aizawl

Teams relegated from the 2015–16 I-League:

- Dempo

Pos	Team	Pld	W	D	L	GF	GA	GD	Pts	Qualification or relegation
1	Bengaluru (C)	16	10	2	4	24	17	+7	32	Qualification to Champions League qualifying play-off
2	Mohun Bagan	16	8	6	2	32	16	+16	30	Qualification to AFC Cup qualifying play-off (Note: Mohun Bagan qualified for the 2017 AFC Cup by winning the 2015–16 Federation Cup.)
3	East Bengal	16	7	4	5	22	18	+4	25	
4	Sporting Goa	16	5	7	4	24	20	+4	22	Withdrew (Note: Sporting Goa and Salgaocar withdrew from I-League.)
5	Mumbai	16	4	7	5	20	19	+1	19	
6	Shillong Lajong	16	4	6	6	14	23	−9	18	
7	Salgaocar (Note: Salgaocar ahead on head-to-head record with a 1–1 draw and 1–0 win over Aizawl over the two legs.)	16	4	4	8	19	27	−8	16	Withdrew
8	Aizawl (Note: Aizawl were supposed to be relegated, but reinstated for 2016–17 season.)	16	4	4	8	15	21	−6	16	
9	DSK Shivajians (Note: DSK Shivajians were given relegation immunity for three years.)	16	3	6	7	16	25	−9	15	

Source: I-League
Rules for classification: 1) points; 2) head-to-head points; 3) head-to-head goal difference; 4) goal difference; 5) number of goals scored; 6) play-off match
(C) Champions

=== I-League 2nd division ===
Pos	Team	Pld	W	D	L	GF	GA	GD	Pts	Qualification
1	Dempo (C, P)	10	7	2	1	16	4	+12	23	Promotion to I-League
2	Minerva	10	5	3	2	14	11	+3	18	
3	NEROCA	10	5	2	3	13	11	+2	17	
4	Mohammedan (Note: 3 points are deducted from Mohammedan SC as per the decision taken by the FIFA Disciplinary Committee.)	10	4	3	3	10	8	+2	12	
5	Gangtok Himalayan	10	1	3	6	7	16	−9	6	
6	Lonestar Kashmir	10	1	1	8	10	20	−10	4	

Source: Results & Fixtures: 2nd Division I-League
Rules for classification: 1) points; 2) head-to-head points; 3) head-to-head goal difference; 4) goal difference; 5) number of goals scored; 6) play-off match
(C) Champions; (P) Promoted
