= Judelin Aveska =

Haitian football defender (born 1987)

Personal information
- Full name: Judelin Aveska
- Date of birth: 21 October 1987 (age 39)
- Place of birth: Port-Margot, Haiti
- Height: 1.83 m (6 ft 0 in)
- Position: Centre back

Youth career
- Racing Club Haïtien
- 2007–2008: River Plate

Senior career*
Years	Team	Apps	(Gls)
2008–2009	River Plate	0	(0)
2008–2009	→ Indpte. Rivadavia (loan)	7	(0)
2009–2013	Ind. Rivadavia	87	(0)
2013–2014	Gimnasia de Jujuy	14	(0)
2014	Juv. Unida Universitario	7	(0)
2015	Almagro	7	(0)
2015	Mohun Bagan		
2016	Colegiales		
2016	Atlético Uruguay		
2016–2017	Deportivo Maipú	8	(0)
2017	Clan Juvenil	6	(0)
2018	Hang Yuen		
2019	Santiago Morning	6	(0)
2020–2023	Hang Yuan	69	(6)
2024	Inter	0	(0)

International career
- Haiti U-15
- Haiti U-17
- Haiti U-20
2007–2008	Haiti U-23		
2010–	Haiti	46	(1)
- * Club domestic league appearances and goals as of 20 November 2022

Judelin Aveska (born October 21, 1987, in Port-Margot) is a Haitian professional footballer who plays as a defender.

He scored his only goal for national team against Antigua and Barbuda on 15 November 2011 at Stade Sylvio Cator
