= Joel Sunday =

Nigerian footballer

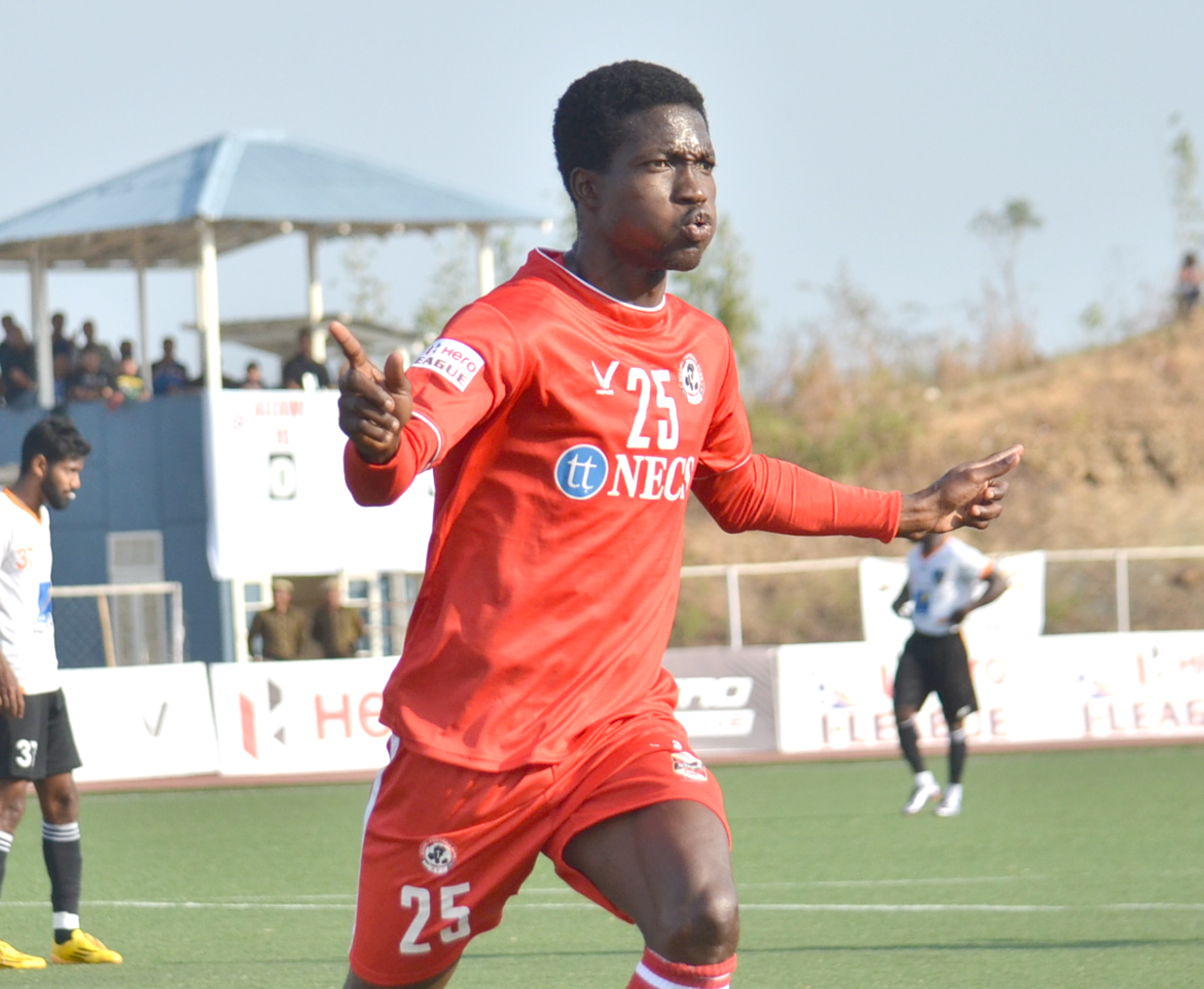
- Sunday with Aizawl in 2016

Personal information
- Full name: Joel Yinka Sunday Ayeni
- Date of birth: 31 December 1988 (age 37)
- Place of birth: Lagos, Nigeria
- Height: 6 ft 1 in (1.85 m)
- Position: Forward

Senior career*
Years	Team	Apps	(Gls)
2008–2010	Larry Sports Club	26	(11)
2010–2011	Mutual Point Sport Club		
2011–12	COD Sports Club		
2012–13	Langsning		
2013–14	Kalighat Milan Sangha		
2014–15	Chanmari		
2014–15	Rangdajied United	13	(10)
2016	Aizawl	12	(8)
2016	Tollygunge Agragami	10	(6)
2017	Minerva Punjab	2	(0)
2017	Pathachakra	6	(4)
2018	Rainbow AC	11	(6)
2018–19	Gokulam Kerala	4	(3)
2019	George Telegraph	8	(7)
2019–20	TRAU		
- * Club domestic league appearances and goals

Joel Yinka Sunday Ayeni (born 31 December 1988) is a Nigerian professional footballer who last played as a forward for I-League outfit TRAU FC.

== Career ==
=== Aizawl FC ===
On 16 February 2016, Sunday was signed by the newly promoted I-League team Aizawl F.C. He was top scorer for the team with 7 goals in 12 games. He scored a winner in dying minutes against the defending champions Bengaluru FC in 2015–16 Indian Federation Cup.

=== Tollygunge Agragami FC ===
On 7 June 2016 Sunday signed for Calcutta Football League outfit SVF Tollygunge Agragami FC. Joel made his debut for Tollygunge Agragami on 28 July 2016 against Peerless SC and helped his team to draw the match 1–1 by scoring in the 81st minute.

=== Gokulam Kerala FC ===
In December 2018 Sunday signed for I-league outfit Gokulam Kerala F.C. as a replacement of their striker Antonio German. Joel found his first goal in his brace against his former club Aizawl F.C. but the club eventually lost to them. He has recently signed for I-league outfits TRAU F.C. for the remainder of the 2019-20 season.

=== TRAU F.C. ===
He has recently signed for I-league outfits TRAU F.C. for the remainder of the 2019-20 season.
