= Bikramjit Singh =

Indian footballer (born 1992)

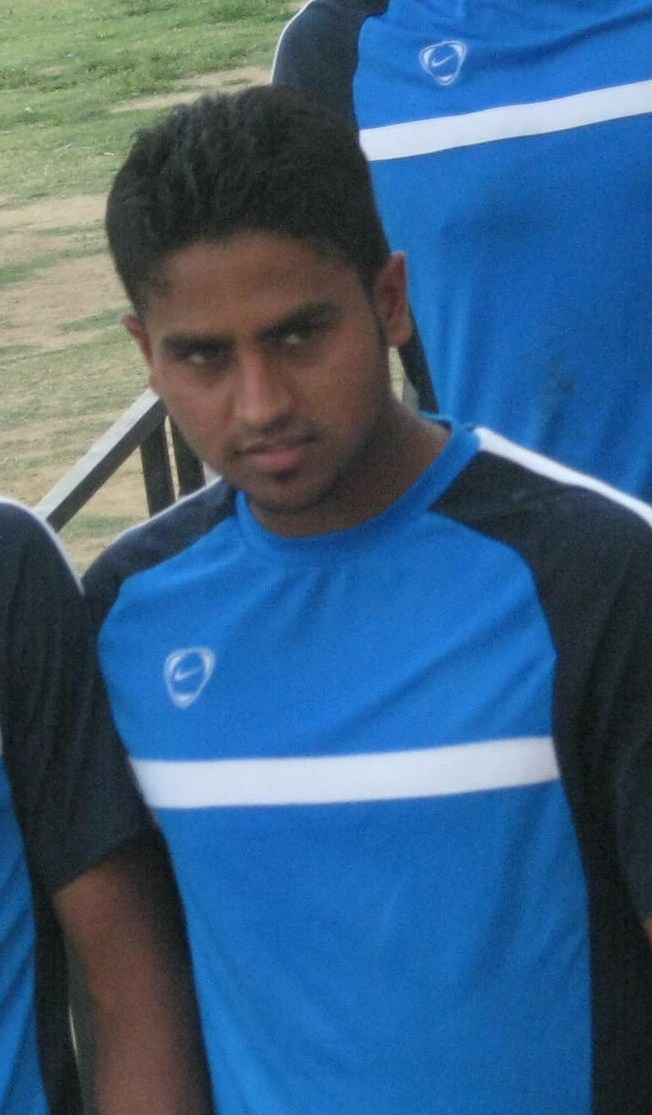
- Singh in 2011

Personal information
- Full name: Bikramjit Singh
- Date of birth: 15 October 1992 (age 34)
- Place of birth: Gurdaspur, Punjab, India
- Height: 1.71 m (5 ft 7 1/2 in)
- Position: Midfielder

Team information
- Current team: Diamond Harbour FC
- Number: 25

Youth career
- Sant Baba Hazara Singh FA

Senior career*
Years	Team	Apps	(Gls)
2010–2012	Indian Arrows	23	(2)
2012–2014	Churchill Brothers	20	(1)
2014	→ Mohun Bagan (loan)	5	(0)
2014–2017	Mohun Bagan	35	(1)
2014–2015	→ Goa (loan)	21	(0)
2016	→ ATK (loan)	7	(0)
2017–2018	Chennaiyin	15	(0)
2018—2020	Odisha	17	(2)
2021	RoundGlass Punjab	11	(0)
2022–2024	Real Kashmir		
2024—	Diamond Harbour FC		

International career
2004–2005	India U15		
2007	India U17		
2008–2010	India U19		
2015–	India U23	4	(0)
- * Club domestic league appearances and goals

Bikramjit Singh (born 15 October 1992) is an Indian professional footballer who plays as a midfielder for the I-League club Diamond Harbour FC.

== Career ==
=== Early career ===
Born in Gurdaspur, Punjab, Singh started his football career at the Sant Baba Hazara Singh Football Academy. He then went on to represent his state at the under-13 level, where he impressed in a tournament in Kolkata and got selected to the India under-13 side. After spending years with the India youth sides, Singh joined the All India Football Federation development side, AIFF XI for the 2010–11 I-League season. He scored his first professional goal directly from a corner kick on 30 December 2010 against HAL. His 53rd-minute strike was the second in a 2–1 victory for the league's developmental side. He then scored his second goal of his career on 13 January 2012 against Sporting Goa. He gave the then Pailan Arrows a 2–1 lead but the side could not hold on as they lost the match 3–2.

=== Churchill Brothers ===
After the 2011–12 season, Singh signed with Churchill Brothers. His first season with the club was a successful one for both the team and him. Singh helped the Goan side win their second I-League title while he played 18 matches and scored a goal. He also scored a long-range goal for Churchill Brothers against Air India on 24 September 2012 in the Federation Cup. Singh also scored an outside the box goal in the league against Prayag United on 28 November 2012. His 79nd-minute goal made it 2–0 to the Goan side who eventually came out 2–1 winners.

During the 2012–13 season, Singh also became a goalscoring threat for Churchill Brothers in the AFC Cup. He scored 57th-minute goal for the club against Indonesian side Semen Padang as the match ended in a 2–2. He scored again in the competition on 2 April 2013 against Singaporean club Warriors in the 44th minute as Churchill Brothers won 3–0.

=== Mohun Bagan ===
During the 2013–14 season, Singh only played twice for Churchill Brothers before requesting a move to I-League rivals Mohun Bagan. According to Singh, Mohun Bagan being coached by Karim Bencherifa was a big reason in him joining the Kolkata club. He made his debut for the club on 16 February 2014 against Salgaocar. He came on as a 77th-minute substitute for Chinadorai Sabeeth as Mohun Bagan lost 1–0.

After the season ended, Singh joined Mohun Bagan permanently before the 2014–15 season. He would go on to win his second I-League championship this season while playing 18 matches with Mohun Bagan. In June 2015, a month after winning the championship, Singh signed a one-year extension with Mohun Bagan due to their participation in the AFC Cup.

On 22 May 2016, Singh scored the fifth and final goal for Mohun Bagan as they defeated Aizawl in the 2016 Federation Cup Final. His 82nd-minute strike helped further seal the match for the side as Singh won his second trophy with Mohun Bagan.

==== FC Goa (loans) ====
Prior to the first season of the Indian Super League, Singh signed with Goa on loan from Mohun Bagan. He made his debut for the side in a round seven match against Mumbai City on 9 November 2014. He started the match and played the full match as Goa drew 0–0. He was retained by the side prior to the 2015 season.

==== Atlético de Kolkata (loan) ====
On 12 May 2016 it was announced that Singh had signed with Atlético de Kolkata on loan for the 2016 season. He made his debut for the side in the team's season opener against Chennaiyin on 2 October 2016. He started and played the full match as Atlético de Kolkata drew it 2–2.

== International ==
Singh was an Indian youth international, having played and captained India at the under-13, under-15, under-17, and under-19 team. While with the youth squads, Singh played against sides such as Bayern Munich, Manchester United, and VfB Stuttgart, while also going on exposure trips to the United States and England.

Singh was selected into the India under-23 side to participate in the 2016 AFC U-23 Championship qualifiers. He made his debut for the side on 27 March 2015 against Uzbekistan U23. He started the match and played the full 90 as India were defeated 2–0.

== Career statistics ==
As of 16 October 2016

Club	Season	League			League Cup		Domestic Cup		Continental		Total	
Club	Season	Division	Apps	Goals	Apps	Goals	Apps	Goals	Apps	Goals	Apps	Goals
Pailan Arrows	2010–11	I-League	8	1	0	0	0	0	—	—	8	1
Pailan Arrows	2011–12	I-League	15	1	0	0	1	0	—	—	16	1
Pailan Arrows	Pailan Arrows Total		23	2	0	0	1	0	0	0	24	2
Churchill Brothers	2012–13	I-League	18	1	0	0	3	1	3	2	24	4
Churchill Brothers	2013–14	I-League	2	0	0	0	0	0	—	—	2	0
Churchill Brothers	Churchill Brothers Total		20	1	0	0	3	1	3	2	26	4
Mohun Bagan (loan)	2013–14	I-League	5	0	0	0	0	0	—	—	5	0
Mohun Bagan	2014–15	I-League	18	1	0	0	0	0	—	—	18	1
Mohun Bagan	2015–16	I-League	8	0	0	0	5	2	6	1	19	3
Mohun Bagan	Mohun Bagan Total		31	1	0	0	5	2	6	1	42	4
Goa (loan)	2014	ISL	9	0	—	—	—	—	—	—	9	0
Goa (loan)	2015	ISL	12	0	—	—	—	—	—	—	12	0
Goa (loan)	Goa Total		21	0	0	0	0	0	0	0	21	0
Atlético de Kolkata (loan)	2016	ISL	4	0	0	0	—	—	—	—	4	0
Career total			99	4	0	0	9	3	9	3	118	10

== Honors ==
Churchill Brothers

- I-League: 2012–13
- Federation Cup: 2013–14

Mohun Bagan

- I-League: 2014–15
- Federation Cup: 2015–16

Atlético de Kolkata

- Indian Super League: 2016 Champions

Chennaiyin FC

- Indian Super League: 2017–18 Champions

India U23

- South Asian Games Silver medal: 2016
