= Jeje Lalpekhlua =

Indian footballer and politician

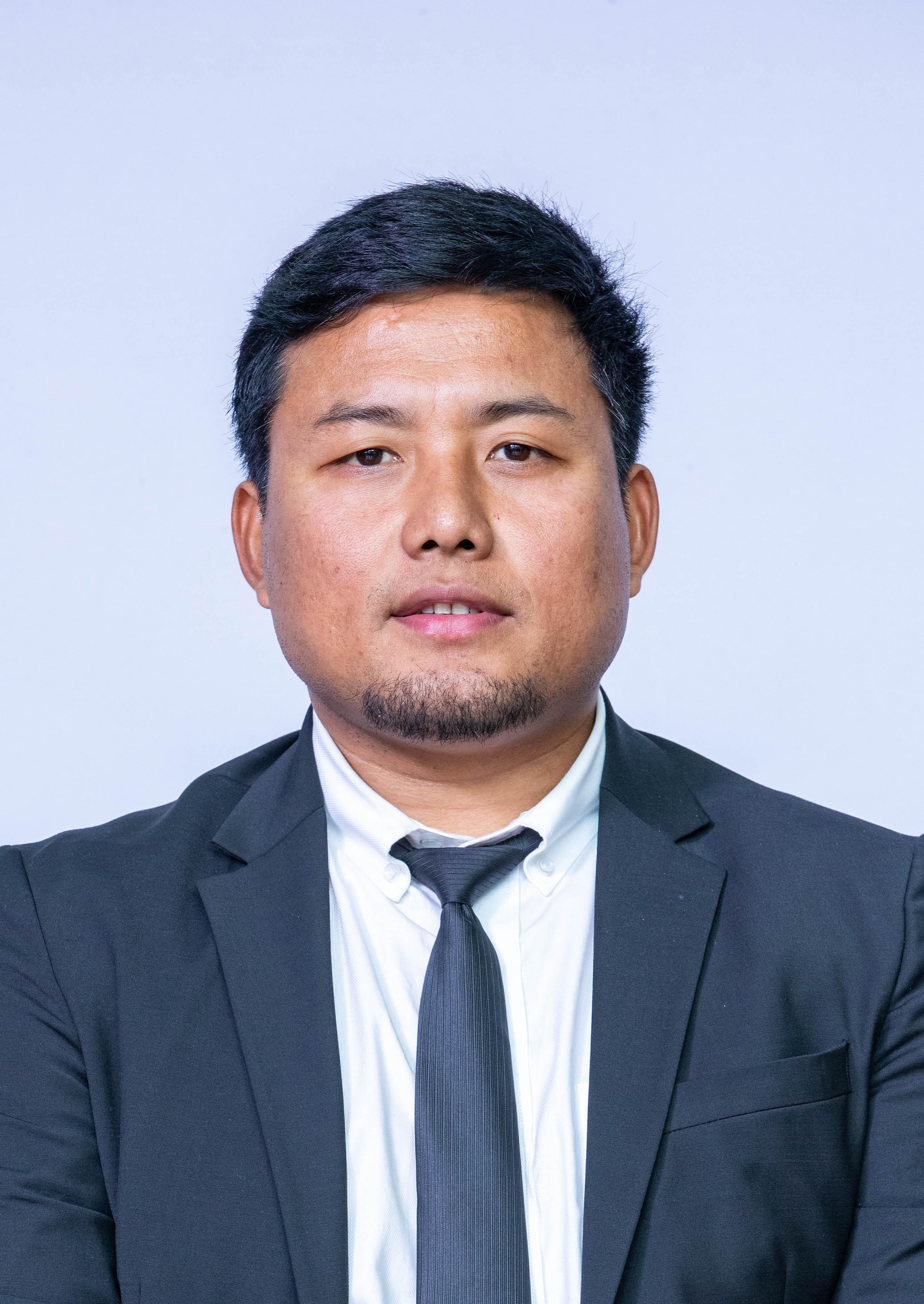
- Jeje in 2023

Personal information
- Full name: Jeje Lalpekhlua Fanai
- Date of birth: 7 January 1991 (age 35)
- Place of birth: Hnahthial, Mizoram, India
- Height: 1.73 m (5 ft 8 in)
- Position: Striker

Youth career
- 2006: Dinthar
- 2007–2008: Pune

Senior career*
Years	Team	Apps	(Gls)
2008–2013	Pune	54	(16)
2010–2011	→ Pailan Arrows (loan)	15	(13)
2013–2014	Dempo	18	(5)
2014–2015	Mohun Bagan	16	(1)
2014	→ Chennaiyin (loan)	13	(4)
2015–2020	Chennaiyin	56	(19)
2016	→ Mohun Bagan (loan)	14	(4)
2017	→ Mohun Bagan (loan)	17	(6)
2020–2021	East Bengal	7	(1)
Total		210	(69)

International career^{‡}
2008–2009	India U19	3	(0)
2009–2011	India U23	13	(6)
2011–2019	India	56	(23)
- * Club domestic league appearances and goals as of 17:37, 6 November 2021 (UTC) ‡ National team caps and goals as of 28 November 2019

Jeje Lalpekhlua

Member of Mizoram Legislative Assembly
- Incumbent
- Assumed office December 2023
- Constituency: South Tuipui Assembly constituency

Personal details
- Born: January 7, 1991 (age 35) Hnahthial, Mizoram, India
- Party: Zoram People's Movement
- Occupation: Footballer, politician

Jeje Lalpekhlua Fanai (born 7 January 1991), simply known as Jeje, is an Indian politician and former professional footballer who played as a striker. On 27 March 2023, he formally joined the Zoram People's Movement and won from the South Tuipui constituency in the 2023 Mizoram Legislative Assembly election.

He is the second-highest Indian goalscorer in the history of the Indian Super League and the record highest scorer for Chennaiyin. Jeje won the 2014–15 I-League with Mohun Bagan and the 2015 Indian Super League with Chennaiyin, subsequently winning the 2015–16 FPAI Indian Player of the Year and the AIFF Men's Player of the Year Award. Between 2011 and 2019, he scored 23 goals in 56 international matches.

== Club career ==
=== Youth career ===
Born in the small village of Hnahthial, Mizoram, Jeje was born in a football-fanatic family. His father and elder brother played for a local club, while his uncle represented Mizoram in the Santosh Trophy. Four months after his father had retired, Jeje made his debut for his club.

Despite initial hesitation from his parents in pursuing football professionally, on account of his strong performance at the state-organised Wai Wai Cup, Jeje made it to the Mizoram U-19 team. He impressed his coaches at the U-19 selection camp in Gwalior and was selected for the national U-19 qualifiers.

=== Pune ===
Jeje's talent caught the attention of Pune FC, who signed him up when he was 16. Initially playing in their youth setup, Jeje would make his senior debut for Pune, who were then in the I-League 2nd Division, during the 2009 I-League 2nd Division season. The then 18-year old, scored against Sporting Goa on 17 October 2009 in a 2–2 draw, during the 2009–10 I-League season. He scored again in the same season against Chirag United in a 1–1 draw.

==== 2010-11 season: Pailan Arrows (loan) ====
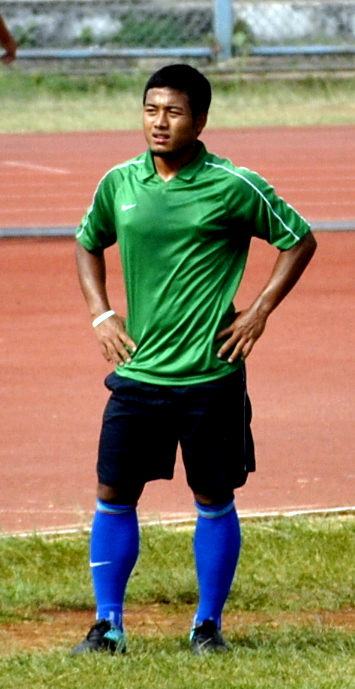
Lalpekhlua in Pailan training in 2011.

On 1 July 2010, Jeje signed for I-League newcomers Pailan Arrows on a one-year loan basis from parent club Pune for the 2010-11 I-League season. The Pailan Arrows team was only made up of Indian under-19 players. During the 2010 Indian Federation Cup, he scored 1 goal for Pailan Arrows in the two games he played. On 3 December 2010, Jeje took part in Pailan Arrows first I-League game, against Chirag United, in a 2–1 loss. On 8 December 2010, Lalpekhlua scored his first ever goal for Pailan Arrows against ONGC FC in a 1–1 draw. After that, Jeje went on a huge goal-scoring run and earned a lot of praise by many top AIFF personnel. On 13 March 2011, Jeje scored 4 goals against Air India in an I-League match which ended in a 5–2 win. He again scored 4 goals against Mohun Bagan in a thrilling 5–4 win, on 29 May which also was his last match for the club. He finished his stellar season with 13 goals in 15 appearances, also becoming the top-scoring Indian player of the season. On 26 September 2011, he won the FPAI Best Young Player Award for the 2010–11 season, beating out players like Raju Gaikwad and Lenny Rodrigues.

==== 2011-12 season: Back to Pune ====
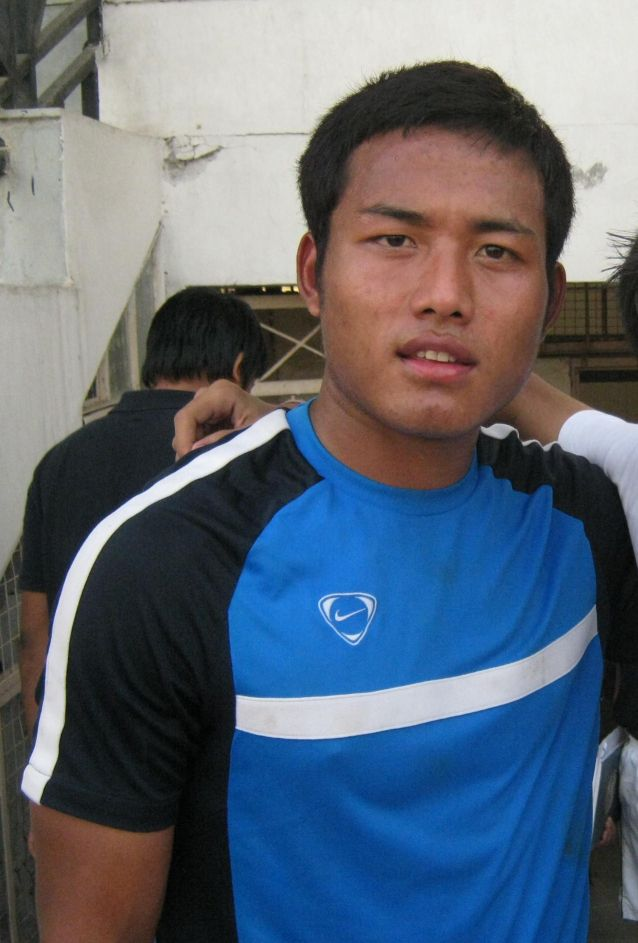
Lalpekhlua in 2011

On 7 July 2011, it was announced that Lalpekhlua was to return to his parent club Pune for the 2011-12 I-League season. Lalpekhlua made his first start and his first overall game for Pune since his return from Pailan Arrows, on 17 September 2011 during the Federation Cup group stage match against Dempo in a 2–1 win. Jeje then scored his second goal in the Federation Cup on 19 September 2011 against East Bengal at the Salt Lake Stadium in a 2–1 loss. Jeje started the 2011–12 I-League season as a regular starter for Pune. In the second game of the season he scored his first goal in the 78th minute to make the score a 1–2 against Sporting Goa, which ended 2–2 on 28 October 2011. Jeje continued his scoring form in the next match as he scored against Chirag United in what was Pune's first win of the season in a 3–1 win on 1 November 2011. He then scored another goal in the I-League against Dempo in the 26th minute on 19 November 2011. Despite the goal, Pune still lost the match 3–1. On 3 January 2012, Jeje came on as a substitute and scored in the 36th minute against Mohun Bagan in a 2–1 win, which also was his last goal of the season. He finished the season with 5 goals.

==== 2012-13 season ====
Jeje scored his first goal of the season in the 51st minute, against now dissolved United Sikkim in the 2012 Indian Federation Cup in a 1–0 win, on 20 September 2012. Jeje then scored in the club's first game of the 2012-13 I-League season on 8 October 2012, in a 3–2 win against ONGC when he converted from the spot kick. He again scored 3 days after, against Mumbai in another 3–2 win. He made his final appearance for the club against Air India on 28 April 2012. He finished the I-League season with 5 goals in 19 appearances.

=== Dempo ===
On 15 June 2013, Jeje signed for Dempo on a two-year contract. Jeje made his debut for the Goan side during the 2013-14 I-League season, on 22 September 2013 against Shillong Lajong, in which he came on as a substitute for Mandar Rao Dessai in the 55th minute, as Dempo lost the match 3–0. He scored his first goal of the club, a week later, against Mumbai in a 1–1 draw. He scored his 5th and final goal for the club against his former club Pune, on 28 April 2014 in a 3–0 win.

=== Mohun Bagan ===
On 28 May 2014, it was announced that Jeje would sign a one-year deal with Mohun Bagan. On 11 August 2014, Jeje scored in his debut, in the 41st minute by earning and converting a penalty, in what proved to be the only goal in a 1–0 win in a match against Tollygunge Agragami in the Calcutta Football League. On 11 August 2014, Jeje scored in his debut, in the 41st minute by earning and converting a penalty, in what proved to be the only goal in a 1–0 win in a match against Tollygunge Agragami in the Calcutta Football League.

==== Chennaiyin (loan) ====
On 1 September 2014, Jeje was loaned out to Chennaiyin for the inaugural 2014 ISL season by Mohun Bagan. On 15 October 2014, Jeje made his debut for the club against Goa, coming on as a substitute for Balwant Singh in the 80th minute. He scored his first goal for the club on 28 October 2014, against Mumbai City in the 26th minute in a thumping 5–1 win. On 16 December 2014, Jeje scored a crucial goal for Chennaiyin against Kerala Blasters in the 2nd leg of the 2014 Indian Super League playoffs semi-final, which took the game to extra time. Chennaiyin won the game by 3–1, but failed to qualify for the finals on aggregate. He finished the season with 4 goals in 13 appearances, which also made him the India top-scorer of the season.

==== Return to Mohun Bagan ====
On 31 December 2014, Jeje returned to his parent club Mohun Bagan after his loan spell with Chennaiyin for the 2014–15 I-League season. On 28 January 2015, he made his I-League debut for Mohun Bagan against Salgaocar, coming on a substitute for Balwant Singh in the 76th minute in a 0–0 draw. He scored his only goal of the 2014-15 I-League season against his former club Pune on 25 April 2015 in a 2–0 win.

=== Chennaiyin ===
Jeje was retained by Chennaiyin for the 2015 Indian Super League. He scored his first goal of the season in the opening match on 3 October 2015, against defending champions ATK in a 3–2 loss. He scored his first career ISL brace against then ISL club Delhi Dynamos on 24 November 2015 in a 4–0 thrashing. He also scored in the 1st leg of the semi-final playoffs against ATK on 12 December 2015 in a 3–0 win. He played in the 2015 Indian Super League final on 20 December 2015, winning the 2015 ISL title for the first time. He finished the season with 6 goals and 3 assists in 11 appearances. He was also chosen as the Emerging Player of the Season. Jeje scored 9 goals from 20 appearances in the 2017–18 Indian Super League including twice in the playoffs semil-final against Goa. Chennai won their second ISL title with a 3–2 win over Bengaluru in the final and Jeje become the first Indian season top-scorer of the club. 2018–19 Indian Super League saw a drop in Jeje's form as he only managed to score a single goal in 16 appearances while Chennai finished the season bottom of the table. Jeje missed whole 2018–19 season due to a major knee injury. On 8 September 2020, Jeje announced his exit from the club after six years of association.

==== Mohun Bagan (loan) ====
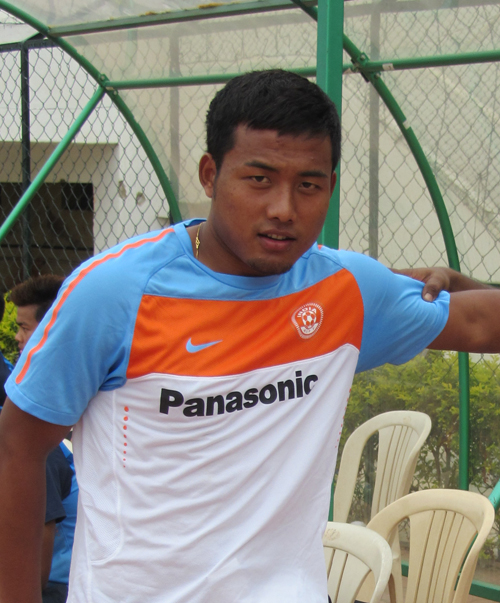
Jeje training with India in 2011

On 8 January 2016, Jeje was loaned to Mohun Bagan by parent club Chennaiyin for the 2015-16 I-League campaign. On his return, he scored his first goal against Tampines Rovers in the preliminary round of the qualifying stage for the 2016 AFC Champions League group stage, which ended in a 3–1 win. He then scored his first league goal of the season on 13 February 2016, against eventual champions Bengaluru in a 2–0 win. On 24 February 2016, Jeje scored a brace against Maziya in the 2016 AFC Cup group stage match, in a 5-2 drubbing. He again scored a brace against Yangon United in the 2016 AFC Cup group stage match, on 16 March 2016, in a thrilling 3–2 win. He finished the 2015-16 I-League season with 4 goals in 14 appearances, finishing runner-up to Bengaluru in the process. He also had a productive AFC Cup campaign, chipping in with 6 goals in 7 appearances. He started the 2015–16 Indian Federation Cup campaign by scoring a brace against Salgaocar in the quarter-final 1st leg 3–2 win. He then scored a hat-trick against Shillong Lajong in the semi-final 1st leg 5-0 drubbing, on 8 May 2016. On 21 May 2016, he capped off his exceptional season with Mohun Bagan, by scoring in the final against Aizawl and winning his first Federation Cup trophy. He was adjudged as the top goal-scorer of the 2015–16 Indian Federation Cup campaign with 8 strikes. He was named as the Best Indian Player by his fellow professionals for his stupendous 2016–17 season.

=== East Bengal ===
On 18 October 2020, Jeje joined East Bengal on a one-year deal ahead of the 2020–21 Indian Super League. He scored in a 6–5 loss against Odisha.

== International career ==
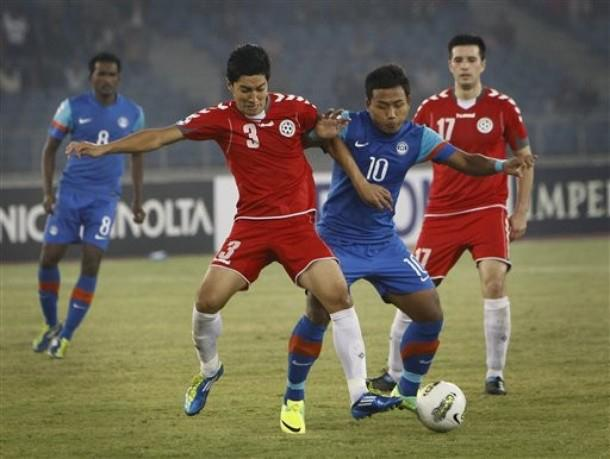
Lalpekhlua (No 10) in action against Afghanistan in 2011

On 23 February 2011, Lalpekhlua played his first international game and scored his first goal for the Indian U-23 team in the 2–1 victory over Myanmar. On 21 March 2011, Lalpekhlua made his senior debut in the 2012 AFC Challenge Cup qualification match against Chinese Taipei and also scored his first goal. On 23 March 2011, Lalpekhlua scored two more goals in his second match against Pakistan, also in the Challenge Cup qualifiers. On 25 March, he scored the fourth goal of his senior international career in a draw against Turkmenistan. On 28 July 2011, Lalpekhlua scored a goal in a 2–2 draw against the United Arab Emirates in the 2014 FIFA World Cup qualification phase. The draw was a historic moment, but it wasn't enough to help India advance as they lost 3–0 in the first leg. Then, on 16 November 2011, Lalpekhlua scored against Malaysia in a 3–2 friendly win. After impressing in a trial with Rangers of Scotland, Lalpekhlua participated in his first competitive tournament, the SAFF Cup and started the first match of the tournament against Afghanistan on 3 December 2011. His first goal did not come until 7 December 2011, when he scored against Sri Lanka. Then, he followed it up by scoring in the final as India defeated Afghanistan 4–0 at the Jawaharlal Nehru Stadium in New Delhi on 11 December 2011.

In a historic 1–4 win against Thailand at the 2019 AFC Asian Cup, he scored the fourth and last goal of the match. However, India lost their next two matches and were eliminated in the group stage.

== Politics ==
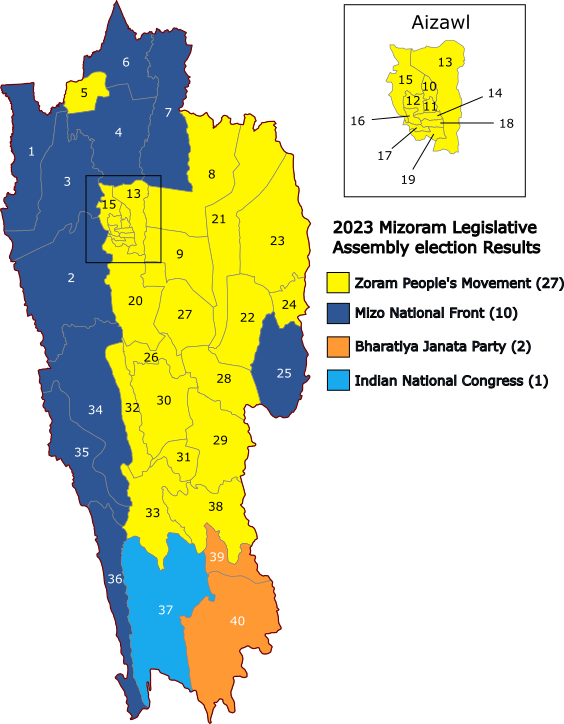
In March 2023 Lalpekhlua joined the Zoram People's Movement to contest the 2023 Mizoram Legislative Assembly election where he won with 5,468 votes.

Becoming an MLA was not my dream. All I wanted to see is an end to poverty and hunger. Until I retired from professional football, I was not interested in politics. Even when I was playing for clubs and the country, political parties invited me but I rejected their offers.

== Career statistics ==
=== Club ===
Statistics accurate as of 8 October 2021

Club	Season	League			Federation Cup/Super Cup		Durand Cup		Continental		Total	
Club	Season	Division	Apps	Goals	Apps	Goals	Apps	Goals	Apps	Goals	Apps	Goals
Pune	2009	I-League 2nd Division	2	3	0	0	0	0	–	–	2	3
Pune	2009–10	I-League	17	2	0	0	0	0	–	–	17	2
Pune	2011–12	I-League	16	5	2	2	0	0	–	–	18	7
Pune	2012–13	I-League	19	5	3	1	2	1	–	–	24	7
Pune	Pune Total		54	15	5	3	2	1	0	0	61	19
Pailan Arrows (loan)	2010–11	I-League	15	13	1	1	0	0	–	–	16	14
Dempo	2013–14	I-League	18	5	2	0	0	0	–	–	20	5
Chennaiyin (loan)	2014	Indian Super League	13	4	–	–	–	–	–	–	13	4
Chennaiyin FC	2015	Indian Super League	11	6	–	–	–	–	–	–	11	6
Chennaiyin FC	2016	Indian Super League	9	3	–	–	–	–	–	–	9	3
Chennaiyin FC	2017–18	Indian Super League	20	9	1	0	–	–	–	–	21	9
Chennaiyin FC	2018–19	Indian Super League	16	1	4	1	–	–	5	1	25	3
Chennaiyin FC	2019–20	Indian Super League	0	0	0	0	–	–	0	0	0	0
Chennaiyin FC	Chennaiyin Total		69	23	5	1	0	0	5	1	79	25
Mohun Bagan	2014–15	I-League	12	1	4	0	0	0	–	–	16	1
Mohun Bagan (loan)	2015–16	I-League	14	4	5	8	–	–	9	7	28	19
Mohun Bagan (loan)	2016–17	I-League	17	5	5	1	–	–	9	5	31	11
Mohun Bagan (loan)	Mohun Bagan Total		43	10	14	9	0	0	18	12	75	31
East Bengal	2020–21	Indian Super League	7	1	–	–	–	–	–	–	7	1
Career Total			206	67	27	14	2	1	23	13	258	95

=== International statistics ===
As of 14 January 2019

India national team
Year	Apps	Goals
2011	15	8
2012	0	0
2013	6	0
2014	0	0
2015	10	3
2016	6	5
2017	9	4
2018	7	2
2019	3	1
Total	56	23

=== International goals ===
As of 6 January 2019

==== Under–23 ====
Goal	Date	Venue	Opponent	Score	Result	Competition
1.	5 December 2009	Bangabandhu National Stadium, Dhaka, Bangladesh	Afghanistan	1–0	1–0	2009 SAFF Championship
2.	23 February 2011	Shree Shiv Chhatrapati Sports Complex, Pune, India	Myanmar U23	4–2	5–2	2012 Olympics Qualifier
3.	19 June 2011	Jassim Bin Hamad Stadium, Doha, Qatar	Qatar U23	1–0	1–3	2012 Olympics Qualifier
4.	23 June 2012	Sultan Qaboos Sports Complex, Muscat, Oman	Lebanon U23	4–2	5–2	2013 AFC U-22 Asian Cup Qualifier
5.	23 June 2012	Sultan Qaboos Sports Complex, Muscat, Oman	Lebanon U23	5–2	5–2	2013 AFC U-22 Asian Cup Qualifier
6.	30 June 2012	Sultan Qaboos Sports Complex, Muscat, Oman	Turkmenistan U23	4–1	4–1	2013 AFC U-22 Asian Cup Qualifier

==== Senior team ====
Scores and results list India's goal tally first.

No.	Date	Venue	Opponent	Score	Result	Competition
1	21 March 2011	Bukit Jalil National Stadium, Kuala Lumpur, Malaysia	Chinese Taipei	1–0	3–0	2012 AFC Challenge Cup qualification
2	23 March 2011	Bukit Jalil National Stadium, Kuala Lumpur, Malaysia	Pakistan	1–1	3–1	2012 AFC Challenge Cup qualification
3	23 March 2011	Bukit Jalil National Stadium, Kuala Lumpur, Malaysia	Pakistan	3–1	3–1	2012 AFC Challenge Cup qualification
4	25 March 2011	Bukit Jalil National Stadium, Kuala Lumpur, Malaysia	Turkmenistan	1–1	1–1	2012 AFC Challenge Cup qualification
5	28 July 2011	Ambedkar Stadium, New Delhi, India	United Arab Emirates	1–2	2–2	2014 FIFA World Cup qualification
6	16 November 2011	Salt Lake Stadium, Kolkata, India	Malaysia	2–1	2–2	Friendly
7	7 December 2011	Jawaharlal Nehru Stadium, Delhi, India	Sri Lanka	1–0	3–0	2011 SAFF Championship
8	11 December 2011	Jawaharlal Nehru Stadium, Delhi, India	Afghanistan	3–0	4–0	2011 SAFF Championship
9	8 August 2015	Köpetdag Stadium, Ashgabat, Turkmenistan	Turkmenistan	1–1	1–2	2018 FIFA World Cup qualification
10	31 December 2015	Trivandrum International Stadium, Thiruvananthapuram, India	Maldives	2–0	3–2	2015 SAFF Championship
11	31 December 2015	Trivandrum International Stadium, Thiruvananthapuram, India	Maldives	3–1	3–2	2015 SAFF Championship
12	3 January 2016	Trivandrum International Stadium, Thiruvananthapuram, India	Afghanistan	1–1	2–1 (a.e.t.)	2015 SAFF Championship
13	2 June 2016	New Laos National Stadium, Vientiane, Laos	Laos	1–0	1–0	2019 AFC Asian Cup qualification
14	7 June 2016	Indira Gandhi Athletic Stadium, Guwahati, India	Laos	1–1	6–1	2019 AFC Asian Cup qualification
15	7 June 2016	Indira Gandhi Athletic Stadium, Guwahati, India	Laos	4–1	6–1	2019 AFC Asian Cup qualification
16	3 September 2016	Mumbai Football Arena, Mumbai, India	Puerto Rico	3–1	4–1	Friendly
17	22 March 2017	Phnom Penh Olympic Stadium, Phnom Penh, Cambodia	Cambodia	2–1	3–2	Friendly
18	6 June 2017	Mumbai Football Arena, Mumbai, India	Nepal	2–0	2–0	Friendly
19	10 October 2017	Sree Kanteerava Stadium, Bangalore, India	Macau	4–1	4–1	2019 AFC Asian Cup qualification
20	14 November 2017	Fatorda Stadium, Margao, India	Myanmar	2–2	2–2	2019 AFC Asian Cup qualification
21	27 March 2018	Dolen Omurzakov Stadium, Bishkek, Kyrgyzstan	Kyrgyzstan	1–2	1–2	2019 AFC Asian Cup qualification
22	4 June 2018	Mumbai Football Arena, Mumbai, India	Kenya	2–0	3–0	2018 Intercontinental Cup
23	6 January 2019	Al Nahyan Stadium, Abu Dhabi, United Arab Emirates	Thailand	4–1	4–1	2019 AFC Asian Cup

==== Unofficial international goal ====
No.	Date	Venue	Opponent	Score	Result
1	13 August 2016	Changlimithang Stadium, Thimphu, Bhutan	Bhutan	2–0	3–0

== Honours ==
India

- SAFF Championship: 2011, 2015; runner-up: 2013
- Tri-Nation Series: 2017
- Intercontinental Cup: 2018

India U23

- SAFF Championship: 2009

Mohun Bagan

- I-League: 2014–15
- Federation Cup: 2015–16

Chennaiyin

- Indian Super League: 2015
- Indian Super League: 2017–18

Individual

- FPAI Best Young Player Award: 2010–11
- AIFF Emerging Player of the Year: 2013
- Indian Super League Emerging Player of the League: 2015
- Federation Cup Top Goalscorer: 2015–16
- Federation Cup Best Player: 2015–16
- FPAI Indian Player of the Year: 2015–16
- AIFF Player of the Year: 2016
- Indian Super League Fans' Player of the Month: December 2017
