= Dhanachandra Singh =

Indian footballer (born 1987)

Personal information
- Full name: Leihaorungbam Dhanachandra Singh
- Date of birth: 30 August 1987 (age 39)
- Place of birth: Imphal, Manipur, India
- Height: 1.80 m (5 ft 11 in)
- Position: Center back

Senior career*
Years	Team	Apps	(Gls)
2007–2008	Air India		
2008–2010	Churchill Brothers		
2010–2011	Air India		
2011–2012	Mumbai	24	(0)
2012–2014	Prayag United	11	(1)
2014–2015	Mohun Bagan	46	(1)
2014	→ Chennaiyin (loan)	14	(2)
2015–2018	Chennaiyin	14	(1)
2016	→ Mohun Bagan (loan)	15	(1)
2018–2019	Jamshedpur FC	14	(1)
2019–2020	Mohun Bagan	10	(0)

International career^{‡}
2015–	India	2	(0)
- * Club domestic league appearances and goals as of 04:52, 15 December 2018 (UTC) ‡ National team caps and goals as of 18 June 2011

Leihaorungbam Dhanachandra Singh is an Indian footballer who plays as left back.

== International ==
Dhanachandra made his national team debut on 11 June 2015 against Oman in a Group D game of the 2018 World Cup qualifier, playing as centre back alongside Arnab Mondal in a 1–2 loss at home in Bengaluru.

== Honours ==
=== Club ===
Mohun Bagan AC

- I-League: 2014–15 I-League Champions
- I-League: 2015–16 I-League Runners up
- I-League: 2016–17 I-League Runners up
- Federation Cup: 2015–16 Federation Cup Champions
- I-League: 2019–20 I-League Champions (Captain)

Chennaiyin FC

- Indian Super League: 2015 Champions
- Indian Super League: 2017–18 Champions
