= Arnab Das Sharma =

Indian footballer (born 1987)

Personal information
- Full name: Arnab Das Sharma
- Date of birth: 20 December 1987 (age 38)
- Place of birth: Balli, Howrah, India
- Height: 6 ft 0 in (1.83 m)
- Position: Goalkeeper

Senior career*
Years	Team	Apps	(Gls)
2007–2008	George Telegraph		
2008	Air India FC		
2008–2009	Kingfisher East Bengal		
2009–2010	Air India(loan)		
2010–2011	Salgaocar SC		
2011–2012	United Sikkim FC		
2012–2013	Mohammedan		
2013	Mumbai Tigers		
2014	Mohammedan		
2014	Atlético de Kolkata		
2016	Mohun Bagan	1	(0)
2016	Mumbai City	0	(0)
2017	Minerva Punjab	11	(0)
2017–2018	Delhi Dynamos	3	(0)
2018–2019	Gokulam Kerala	10	(0)
2019–2020	Bhawanipore	13	(0)
2021–2022	Southern Samity	1	(0)
	Velsao Sports		(0)
- * Club domestic league appearances and goals as of 3 February 2020

Arnab Das Sharma (Bengali: অর্ণব দাস শর্মা; born 20 December 1987) is an Indian football player.

== Career ==
=== Youth ===
Sharma stepped into club level football at the age of 13, joining Kalighat Club in Kolkata after successfully giving a trial there. He continued to play for the team until he was selected to play for the youth team at Rajasthan Football Club, Kolkata.

=== Professional ===
==== George Telegraph SC ====
After a successful youth career, Sharma was picked up by George Telegraph SC, one of Kolkata's major football teams and continued to play for the team in the Calcutta Football League.

==== Air India ====
Goalkeeper coach Somen SinghaChowdhury sent this player to Air India FC coach Bimal Ghosh. Signing for the Mumbai-based club was Sharma's debut in the I-League, India's highest football league.

==== Kingfisher East Bengal ====
In the year 2008, having had a series of brilliant displays in goal, Kolkata giants East Bengal FC approached the youngster and he finally signed for the team. This season was not one to remember for Sharma, having fallen to 2nd choice to India no. 1 Subrata Paul.

==== Back to Air India ====
The following year, hearing of the keepers availability, Air India FC wasted no time in signing Sharma (on loan), making it his second-stint with the team. Regaining his starting place in the I-League, Air India performed well and Sharma was said to have single-handed rescued the team on numerous occasions.

==== Salgaocar SC ====
Observing his fantastic display, Salgaocar SC did not think twice before bringing the Bengali lad to Goa from Air India. The green outfit were said to have the best keeper combination in the league with Karanjit Singh and Arnab Das Sharma in the same team. In a match against former club East Bengal, an error by Sharma which allowed East Bengal's Australian striker Tolgay Ozbey to score led to an argument between him and Salgaocar's Moroccan coach Karim Bencherifa.

==== United Sikkim FC ====
After having a disastrous year in Goa, Sharma had offers from a few I-League and a few Kolkata-based clubs but he opted to join I-League 2nd Division outfit United Sikkim FC, the team owned by iconic footballer Baichung Bhutia and sponsored by Bollywood playback singer Shankar Mahadevan and Dubai-based company Fidelis World.

==== Mohammedan Sporting Club ====
In January 2012 he signed to Mohammedan Sporting Club from Kolkata for 2nd Division I-league.

==== Mohun Bagan Athletics Club ====
In June 2015, he signed to Mohun Bagan Athletics Club from Kolkata for 1st Division I-league.
