= David Lalrinmuana =

Indian footballer

Personal information
- Full name: David Lalrinmuana
- Date of birth: 9 November 1992 (age 34)
- Place of birth: Mizoram, India
- Position: Attacking midfielder

Youth career
- 2006: Mohun Bagan

Senior career*
Years	Team	Apps	(Gls)
2007	Madras Sporting Union		
2008–2012	Faria Strikers		
2012	Aizawl		
2012–2013	ONGC	16	(1)
2013–2016	Aizawl		
2016	Mumbai City		
2017	East Bengal F.C.		
2017	Aizawl	12	(1)
- * Club domestic league appearances and goals

David Lalrinmuana (born 9 November 1992) is an Indian professional footballer who plays as a midfielder for Chanmari in the I-League 2.

== Career ==
Born in Mizoram, Lalrinmuana joined the Mohun Bagan Academy after participating in the Subroto Cup with his state. After spending a year with Mohun Bagan, Lalrinmuana moved to Chennai and played first-team senior football with Madras Sporting Union in the CFA Senior Division at only the age of fifteen. After the season, he moved back to Mizoram to play for his state in the youth national competitions. From 2008 to 2012 Lalrinmuana moved to Goa to play for Faria Strikers and at one point represented the side in the Goa Professional League. While with Faria Strikers, Lalrinmuana also turned out for the Mizoram football team in the Santosh Trophy.

In 2012, Lalrinmuana moved back to Mizoram to sign with I-League 2nd Division side Aizawl. After the season, in which Aizawl finished bottom of the table in the final round, Lalrinmuana was declared the best player in the 2nd Division. Despite failing to gain promotion with Aizawl, Lalrinmuana himself moved up to the I-League after he signed with ONGC. He made his professional debut with the club on 8 October 2012 against Pune. He came on as a 77th-minute substitute for Lalu KV as ONGC lost 3–2. He scored his one and only goal for the club on 7 April 2013 against Shillong Lajong. His 63rd-minute goal was the equalizer as ONGC drew the match 1–1.

After the 2012–13 I-League Lalrinmuana moved back to Aizawl. He experienced plenty of success with the club. He captained the side to the Mizoram Premier League title, he helped Mizoram win the Santosh Trophy, and helped Aizawl earn promotion to the I-League in 2015. He also earned the "Player of the Year" award for the Mizoram Premier League in both 2015 and 2016.

Lalrinmuana made his return to the I-League with Aizawl on 9 January 2016 against his former club when he was a teenager, Mohun Bagan. He came on as a 75th-minute substitute for H Lalbiakthanga as Aizawl lost the match 3–1. During the season, he was won the Man of the Match award four times before eventually being nominated for the FPAI Fans Player of the Year.

=== Mumbai City ===
On 7 July 2016 it was announced that Lalrinmuana had signed with Mumbai City of the Indian Super League. After appearing on the bench in the first three matches of the season, Lalrinmuana made his debut for Mumbai City on 14 October against the Kerala Blasters. He only played the first half as Mumbai City lost 1–0.

== Professional statistics ==
As of 23 February 2018

Club	Season	League			League Cup		Domestic Cup		Continental		Total	
Club	Season	Division	Apps	Goals	Apps	Goals	Apps	Goals	Apps	Goals	Apps	Goals
ONGC	2012–13	I-League	16	1	—	—	—	—	—	—	16	1
Aizawl	2015–16	I-League	14	0	—	—	—	—	—	—	14	0
Mumbai City	2016	ISL	2	0	0	0	—	—	—	—	2	0
East Bengal	2016–17	I-League	1	0	—	—	—	—	—	—	1	0
Aizawl	2017–18	I-League	12	1	—	—	—	—	—	—	12	1
Career total			45	2	0	0	0	0	0	0	45	2

== Honours ==
=== Club ===
Aizawl

- I-League 2nd Division: 2015
- Mizoram Premier League: 2014–15, 2015–16

Mizoram

- Santosh Trophy: 2014

=== Individual ===
- I-League 2nd Division Player of the Year 2012
- Mizoram Premier League Player of the Year 2015
- Mizoram Premier League Player of the Year 2016
