= Sanjay Balmuchu =

Indian professional footballer

Personal information
- Date of birth: 5 January 1992 (age 34)
- Place of birth: West Singhbhum, Jharkhand
- Positions: Center-back; defensive midfielder

Team information
- Current team: Mumbai City FC

Youth career
- Tata FA

Senior career*
Years	Team	Apps	(Gls)
2012–2014	Churchill Brothers	20	(0)
2015	Mohammedan	8	(0)
2015–2016	Mohun Bagan	4	(0)
2016	FC Goa	11	(0)
2017–2018	Chennaiyin	1	(0)
2018	Jamshedpur	1	(0)
2019—	Mumbai City FC	0	(0)
- * Club domestic league appearances and goals as of 24 July 2018

Sanjay Balmuchu (born 5 January 1992) is an Indian professional footballer who plays as a defender for Mumbai City FC in the Indian Super League.

== Career ==
=== Churchill Brothers ===
After graduating from the Tata Football Academy, Balmuchu was announced as a Churchill Brothers player on 13 July 2012 for their I-League campaign. He made his professional debut for the club on 4 January 2013 against Shillong Lajong. He started and played the whole match as Churchill Brothers won 6–0. While with the club, Balmuchu was a part of the 2012–13 I-League winning team, and the 2013–14 Indian Federation Cup sides.

After Churchill Brothers were expelled from the I-League, Balmuchu continued to play for the club in the Goa Professional League and Durand Cup. He eventually left Churchill Brothers to sign for Mohammedan of the I-League 2nd Division.

=== Mohun Bagan ===
After some time with Mohammedan, Balmuchu signed for reigning I-League champions, Mohun Bagan, on 24 June 2015.

== International ==
Balmuchu was selected into the initial squad for the India U23 side in the 2014 Asian Games.

== Career statistics ==
As of 24 June 2015

Club	Season	League			Federation Cup		Durand Cup		AFC		Total	
Club	Season	Division	Apps	Goals	Apps	Goals	Apps	Goals	Apps	Goals	Apps	Goals
Churchill Brothers	2012–13	I-League	8	0	0	0	0	0	6	0	14	0
Churchill Brothers	2013–14	I-League	12	0	5	0	0	0	6	0	23	0
Career total			20	0	5	0	0	0	12	0	37	0

== Honours ==
=== Club ===
Chennaiyin FC

- Indian Super League: 2017–18 Champions
