= Uilliams =

Brazilian footballer

Personal information
- Full name: Uilliams Bomfim Souza
- Date of birth: 17 January 1989 (age 37)
- Place of birth: Santo Antônio de Jesus, Brazil
- Height: 1.80 m (5 ft 11 in)
- Position: Striker

Senior career*
Years	Team	Apps	(Gls)
2009–2010	Camaçari	24	(2)
2011	Arapongas	7	(0)
2012	Camaçari	19	(3)
2012–2013	SC Sagamihara	11	(1)
2013–2016	Shillong Lajong	49	(18)
- * Club domestic league appearances and goals as of 14:33, 5 April 2016 (UTC)

Uilliams Bomfim Souza (born 17 January 1989), commonly known as Uilliams, is a Brazilian footballer who played as a striker for Shillong Lajong in the Indian I-League.

== Career ==
On 8 September 2013 it was announced that Uilliams has signed with Shillong Lajong
