= Fábio Pena =

Brazilian footballer (born 1990)

Fábio Henrique Pena
Personal information
- Date of birth: August 27, 1990 (age 36)
- Place of birth: Pires do Rio, Brazil
- Height: 1.90 m (6 ft 3 in)
- Position: Forward

Senior career*
Years	Team	Apps	(Gls)
2010	Mogi Mirim	?	(?)
2010−2014	Roasso Kumamoto	90	(9)
2015	Real Noroeste	1	(0)
2016−2017	Shillong Lajong	29	(6)
- * Club domestic league appearances and goals as of 30 April 2017

Fábio Henrique Pena (born August 27, 1990, in Pires do Rio) is a Brazilian professional football player, who last played for Shillong Lajong FC in the I-League.

== Playing career ==
After a season in Mogi Mirim Fabio moved to J2 League club Roasso Kumamoto in 2010. After four seasons in Japan he returned to Brazil in 2014.

After a failed negotiation with Série A club Goiás he signed for another Brazilian club Real Noroeste.

On 31 December 2015 it was announced that Fabio has signed for Indian club Shillong Lajong F.C. for the 2015–16 I-League Season.
