= Calvin Mbarga =

Cameroonian footballer

Personal information
- Date of birth: 26 June 1987 (age 39)
- Place of birth: Cameroon
- Position: Striker

Team information
- Current team: Birkalla

Youth career
- Unisport Bafang

Senior career*
Years	Team	Apps	(Gls)
2011	Western Strikers	17	(12)
2012–2013	Campbelltown City	43	(19)
2014	Adelaide Blue Eagles	24	(20)
2015	Hume City	9	(0)
2015	Northcote City	14	(5)
2015–2016	Salgaocar F.C.	10	(1)
2017	Port Melbourne	11	(1)
2017	St Albans Saints	7	(1)
2018	Sunshine George Cross	11	(0)
2018	Whittlesea Ranges	12	(0)
2019–2022	Birkalla	82	(24)
2023	Adelaide University	11	(4)
2023–2024	Birkalla	10	(4)

International career^{‡}
2007	Cameroon U20		
- * Club domestic league appearances and goals as of 19 August 2022 ‡ National team caps and goals as of 19 August 2022

Calvin Mbarga (born 26 June 1987) is a Cameroonian professional footballer who plays as a forward for Port Melbourne SC.

== Career ==
Mbarga has spent the majority of his career playing in Cameroon, Canada, the United Arab Emirates, and Australia. While in Australia, Mbarga played for lower-division sides such as Western Strikers, Campbelltown City, Adelaide Blue Eagles, and Hume City. He joined Hume City in 2014.

Mbarga also works as a personal trainer in Southern Adelaide. He specialises in strength and conditioning training, weightloss, injury management, and sport specific training.

=== Salgaocar ===
In October 2015, Mbarga moved to India to sign with I-League side, Salgaocar, as their Asian quota player due to him having Australian citizenship.
