= Abhishek Das (footballer) =

Indian footballer (born 1993)

Personal information
- Full name: Abhishek Das
- Date of birth: 15 November 1993 (age 32)
- Place of birth: Kolkata, West Bengal
- Height: 1.70 m (5 ft 7 in)
- Position: Right back

Team information
- Current team: Diamond Harbour

Youth career
- Tata FA

Senior career*
Years	Team	Apps	(Gls)
2010–2016	East Bengal	32	(1)
2010–2011	→ Pailan Arrows (loan)		
2012–2013	→ United Sikkim (loan)	14	(0)
2014	→ Chennaiyin (loan)	4	(0)
2015	→ Chennaiyin (loan)	3	(0)
2016	Mohun Bagan A.C.	3	(0)
2016–2017	Chennai City	14	(0)
2017	Mohun Bagan A.C.	4	(0)
2018–2019	Gokulam Kerala	14	(0)
2019–2021	TRAU	8	(0)
2021	Southern Samity		
2022–	Diamond Harbour		

International career
2007	India U16		
2009	India U19		
2011	India U23		
- * Club domestic league appearances and goals

Abhishek Das (Bengali: অভিষেক দাস; born 15 November 1993) is an Indian professional footballer who plays as a right back.

== Club career ==
=== East Bengal ===
Das began playing football from the age of 4 and eventually joined the Tata Football Academy. In 2010, Das graduated from the Tata Football Academy and signed for East Bengal of the I-League but was then sent on loan to Pailan Arrows, then known as the AIFF XI. After spending the 2010–11 at Arrows, he returned to East Bengal. The 2011–12 season started off well for Das as he was included in East Bengal's 2011 Federation Cup squad. He made his first team debut for East Bengal against Mohammedan on 17 September 2011 during the Federation Cup.

=== Indian Super League ===
Abhishek represented Chennaiyin FC for the 2014 Indian Super League. He was retained by the club will also play for Chennaiyin in the 2015 Indian Super League.

== International career ==
Das made his youth international debut at the under-23 level for India U23 against Myanmar in the 2012 Olympic Qualifiers on 23 February 2011. He then made his second start for India U23 in the next match against Myanmar in the second leg which ended in a 1–1 draw but a 3–2 victory for India on aggregate. He then continued his run with the India U23 team during the 2nd Round of Olympic Qualifiers against Qatar. The match ended 3–1 in Qatar's favor. He was still not done though with the India U23 team as he still played during the second leg of the Olympic Qualifiers against Qatar U23 which ended with India getting knocked out of the qualifiers 4–2 on aggregate after the match ended in a 1–1 tie.

== Career statistics ==
=== Club ===
Statistics accurate as of 30 May 2015

Club	Season	League		Federation Cup		Durand Cup		AFC		Total	
Club	Season	Apps	Goals	Apps	Goals	Apps	Goals	Apps	Goals	Apps	Goals
East Bengal	2011–12	0	0	1	0	0	0	0	0	1	0
United Sikkim (loan)	2012–13	14	0	0	0	0	0	–	–	14	0
East Bengal	2012–13	0	0	3	0	0	0	1	0	4	0
East Bengal	2013–14	10	1	2	0	0	0	–	–	12	1
Chennaiyin FC (loan)	2014	4	0	–	–	–	–	–	–	4	0
East Bengal	2014–15	10	0	4	0	0	0	1	0	15	0
Career total		38	1	10	0	0	0	2	0	50	1

== Honors ==
=== Club ===
Chennaiyin FC

- Indian Super League: 2015
