= 2014–15 Mohun Bagan FC season =

Indian football club season

Mohun Bagan
2014–15 season
- Chairman: Siddharth Mallya
- Head coach: Subhash Bhowmick; Sanjoy Sen
- Stadium: Salt Lake Stadium; Barasat Stadium
- I-League: Champions
- Calcutta Football League: Runners-up
- Federation Cup: Group stage
- King's Cup: Semi-finalist
- Top goalscorer: League: Norde (9); All: Boya (14)
Home colours	Away colours

The 2014–15 Mohun Bagan FC season was the club's 8th season in I-League and 125th season since its establishment in 1889. The team finished runners-up in the Calcutta Football League and were crowned Champions in the I-League. Mohun Bagan reached the semifinals of the King's Cup where they were defeated by Pune and they bowed out in the group stage of the Federation Cup.

== Transfers ==
=== In ===
==== Pre-season ====
Pos.	Name	Signed from	Ref.
GK	(India) Debjit Majumder	(India) Bhawanipore	
GK	(India) Vinay Singh	(India) Shillong Lajong	
GK	(India) Laltu Mondal	(India) Taltala Deepti Sangha	
DF	(Nigeria) Alao Fatai Adisa	(Yemen) Al-Oruba	
DF	(India) Dhanachandra Singh	(India) United	
DF	(India) Sukhen Dey	(India) United	
DF	(India) Johny Routh	(India) Bhawanipore	
DF	(India) Satish Singh	(India) Churchill Brothers	
DF	(India) Pratik Chaudhari	(India) Rangdajied United	
DF	(India) Sonam Bhutia	(India) United Sikkim	
DF	(India) Suman Hazra	(India) Mohun Bagan SAIL Academy	
MF	(India) Souvik Chakraborty	(India) United	
MF	(India) Sehnaj Singh	(India) Mumbai	
MF	(India) Tirthankar Sarkar	(India) Pailan Arrows	
MF	(India) Lalkamal Bhowmick	(India) United	
MF	(India) Randeep Singh	(India) Salgaocar	
FW	(India) Jeje Lalpekhlua	(India) Dempo	
FW	(India) Balwant Singh	(India) Churchill Brothers	
FW	(Cameroon) Pierre Boya ^{MP}	(Albania) FK Kukësi	

==== Mid-season ====
Pos.	Name	Signed from	Ref.
DF	(Brazil) Alex Silveira	(India) Bhawanipore	
DF	(Nigeria) Bello Razaq	(India) Tollygunge Agragami	
DF	(India) Anwar Ali	(India) Delhi Dynamos	
MF	(Haiti) Sony Norde	(Bangladesh) Dhanmondi	
MF	(India) Aayushmaan Chaturvedi	(India) Ashoka F.C.	

=== Out ===
==== Pre-season ====
Pos.	Name	Sold to	Ref.
GK	(India) Sandip Nandy	(India) Kerala Blasters	
DF	(India) Aiborlang Khongjee	(India) Shillong Lajong	
DF	(India) Ravinder Singh	Released	
DF	(Nigeria) Echezona Anyichie	(India) Royal Wahingdoh	
DF	(India) Rowilson Rodrigues	(India) Dempo	
DF	(India) Wahid Sali	Released	
DF	(India) Rana Gharami	Released	
MF	(India) Adil Khan	(India) Mohammedan	
MF	(India) Zakeer Mundampara	(India) Salgaocar	
MF	(India) T.Seiboi Haokip	Released	
MF	(India) Rajib Ghorui	Released	
MF	(India) Arghya Chakraborty	Released	
MF	(India) Shaiju Mon	Released	
MF	(India) Prayashu Halder	Released	
MF	(India) Abung Meetei	Released	
FW	(Nigeria) Odafa Onyeka Okolie	(India) Churchill Brothers	
FW	(Nigeria) Christopher Chizoba	(India) Lonestar Kashmir	
FW	(India) Shankar Oraon	Released	

==== Mid-season ====
Pos.	Name	Sold to	Ref.
DF	(Nigeria) Alao Fatai Adisa	Released	
DF	(Brazil) Alex Silveira	Released	

== Kits ==
Supplier: Shiv Naresh / Sponsors: McDowell's No.1

Home	Away	Goalkeeper

== Squad ==
=== First-team squad ===
Name	Nationality	Position	Date of Birth (Age)
Goalkeepers
Shilton Pal (captain)	(India)	GK	20 December 1987 (age 38)
Debjit Majumder	(India)	GK	6 March 1988 (age 38)
Monotosh Ghosh	(India)	GK	19 September 1989 (age 37)
Vinay Singh	(India)	GK	16 October 1977 (age 49)
Laltu Mondal	(India)	GK	—
Defenders
Bello Razaq	(Nigeria)	DF	19 August 1984 (age 42)
Anwar Ali	(India)	DF	24 September 1984 (age 42)
Pritam Kotal	(India)	DF	9 August 1993 (age 33)
Dhanachandra Singh	(India)	DF	4 March 1987 (age 39)
Kingshuk Debnath	(India)	DF	8 May 1985 (age 41)
Shouvik Ghosh	(India)	DF	5 November 1992 (age 34)
Sukhen Dey	(India)	DF	1 January 1990 (age 36)
Johny Routh	(India)	DF	—
Satish Singh	(India)	DF	10 November 1993 (age 33)
Pratik Chaudhari	(India)	DF	4 October 1989 (age 37)
Sonam Bhutia	(India)	DF	26 January 1994 (age 32)
Suman Hazra	(India)	DF	—
Midfielders
Manish Bhargav	(India)	MF	24 February 1994 (age 32)
Denson Devadas	(India)	MF	20 December 1982 (age 43)
Souvik Chakraborty	(India)	MF	12 July 1991 (age 35)
Sehnaj Singh	(India)	MF	29 July 1993 (age 33)
Tirthankar Sarkar	(India)	MF	1 July 1993 (age 33)
Lalkamal Bhowmick (vice-captain)	(India)	MF	2 January 1987 (age 39)
Bikramjit Singh	(India)	MF	15 October 1992 (age 34)
Pankaj Moula	(India)	MF	20 December 1992 (age 33)
Katsumi Yusa	(Japan)	MF	2 August 1988 (age 38)
Sony Norde	(Haiti)	MF	27 July 1989 (age 37)
Ujjal Howladar	(India)	MF	1 January 1986 (age 40)
Adarsh Tamang	(India)	MF	5 July 1995 (age 31)
Ram Malik	(India)	MF	10 March 1991 (age 35)
Randeep Singh	(India)	MF	16 November 1990 (age 35)
Ayushman Chaturvedi	(India)	MF	—
Forwards
Chinadorai Sabeeth	(India)	FW	2 December 1990 (age 35)
Jeje Lalpekhlua	(India)	FW	7 January 1991 (age 35)
Balwant Singh	(India)	FW	15 December 1986 (age 39)
Pierre Boya ^{MP}	(Cameroon)	FW	16 January 1984 (age 42)
Prakash Roy	(India)	FW	—

Last updated: 30 December 2014
Source: mohunbaganac.com

== Technical staff ==
Position	Name
Chief coach	(India) Subhash Bhowmick
Chief coach	(India) Sanjoy Sen
Assistant coach	(India) Sankarlal Chakraborty
Goalkeeping coach	(India) Arpan Dey
Physical Trainer	(Brazil) Djair Miranda Garcia
Physiotherapist	(India) Abhinandan Chatterjee
Club Doctor	(India) Dr. Protim Ray
Team Manager	(India) Satyajit Chatterjee

Source: Mohunbaganac.com

== Statistics ==
=== Calcutta Football League stats ===
Win Draw Loss

Opposition	Score
Army XI	4–2
Techno Aryan	1–0
Bengal Nagpur Railway	2–1
East Bengal	1–3
Kalighat M.S.	2–0
Mohammedan	1–2
Police AC	3–0
SAI Darjeeling	1–0
Southern Samity	3–1
Tollygunge Agragami	1–0

Last Updated: 15 September 2014
Source: Statistics

==== Goal scorers ====
Pos.	Nat.	Name	Goal(s)	Appearance(s)
FW	(India)	Balwant Singh	7	9
FW	(Cameroon)	Pierre Boya	6	9
FW	(India)	Chinadorai Sabeeth	3	5
FW	(India)	Jeje Lalpekhlua	2	4
MF	(India)	Pankaj Moula	1	6
TOTAL			19	10

Last updated: 15 September 2014
Source: Matches

==== Disciplinary record ====
Pos.	Nat.	Player	Yellow card	(yellow card) (yellow-red card)	Red card	Notes
MF	(India)	Sehnaj Singh	3	0	0	Missed Match: vs Bengal Nagpur Railway (9 September 2014)
MF	(Japan)	Katsumi Yusa	3	0	0	Missed Match: vs Bengal Nagpur Railway (9 September 2014)
DF	(India)	Shouvik Ghosh	2	0	0	Missed Match: vs East Bengal (31 August 2014)
FW	(India)	Chinadorai Sabeeth	1	0	0	
MF	(India)	Souvik Chakraborty	1	0	0	
DF	(India)	Dhanachandra Singh	1	0	0	
DF	(India)	Kingshuk Debnath	1	0	0	
DF	(India)	Johny Routh	1	0	0	
DF	(India)	Satish Singh	1	0	0	
DF	(Nigeria)	Alao Fatai Adisa	1	0	0	

Last updated: 15 September 2014
Source: Matches

=== King's Cup stats ===
Win Draw Loss

Opposition	Score
(Bhutan) Druk United	3–3
(Thailand) Nakhon Ratchasima	3–0
(Bangladesh) Dhanmondi	3–5
(India) Pune	1–1 (a.e.t.) (5–6 p)

Last Updated: 30 November 2014
Source: Statistics

==== Goal scorers ====
Pos.	Nat.	Name	Goal(s)	Appearance(s)
FW	(Cameroon)	Pierre Boya	4	4
MF	(India)	Pankaj Moula	2	3
MF	(Haiti)	Sony Norde	2	3
MF	(Brazil)	Alex Silveira	1	3
MF	(Japan)	Katsumi Yusa	1	4
TOTAL			10	4

Last updated: 30 November 2014
Source: Matches

==== Disciplinary record ====
Pos.	Nat.	Player	Yellow card	(yellow card) (yellow-red card)	Red card	Notes
MF	(India)	Tirthankar Sarkar	0	0	1	Missed Match: vs Nakhon Ratchasima (25 November 2014)
FW	(Cameroon)	Pierre Boya	2	0	0	
MF	(India)	Sehnaj Singh	2	0	0	
MF	(India)	Lalkamal Bhowmick	2	0	0	
MF	(Japan)	Katsumi Yusa	1	0	0	
MF	(Haiti)	Sony Norde	1	0	0	
DF	(India)	Satish Singh	1	0	0	
DF	(India)	Pratik Chaudhari	1	0	0	
DF	(Brazil)	Alex Silveira	1	0	0	

Last updated: 30 November 2014
Source: Matches

=== Federation Cup stats ===
Win Draw Loss

Opposition	Score
Bengaluru FC	0–0
Pune	1–1
Salgaocar	1–4
Shillong Lajong	1–0

Last Updated: 6 January 2015
Source: Statistics

==== Goal scorers ====
Pos.	Nat.	Name	Goal(s)	Appearance(s)
FW	(Cameroon)	Pierre Boya	2	3
DF	(India)	Kingshuk Debnath	1	2
TOTAL			3	4

Last updated: 6 January 2015
Source: Matches

==== Disciplinary record ====
Pos.	Nat.	Player	Yellow card	(yellow card) (yellow-red card)	Red card	Notes
DF	(India)	Shouvik Ghosh	2	0	0	Missed Match: vs Salgaocar (4 January 2015)
MF	(India)	Lalkamal Bhowmick	1	0	0	
MF	(Nigeria)	Bello Razaq	1	0	0	

Last updated: 6 January 2015
Source: Matches

=== I-League stats ===
Win Draw Loss

Opposition	Home Score	Away Score
Bengaluru FC	4–1	1–1
Bharat FC	2–0	0–1
Dempo	2–0	1–1
East Bengal	1–0	1–1
Mumbai	3–1	1–1
Pune	1–0	2–0
Royal Wahingdoh	2–0	2–3
Salgaocar	3–1	0–0
Shillong	0–0	4–3
Sporting Goa	2–0	1–2

Last Updated: 31 May 2015
Source: Statistics

==== Goal scorers ====
Pos.	Nat.	Name	Goal(s)	Appearance(s)
MF	(Haiti)	Sony Norde	9	19
MF	(Japan)	Katsumi Yusa	7	20
FW	(India)	Balwant	6	17
DF	(India)	Dhanachandra Singh	2	14
FW	(Cameroon)	Pierre Boya	2	16
DF	(India)	Pritam Kotal	2	17
FW	(India)	Jeje Lalpekhlua	1	12
MF	(India)	Denson Devadas	1	13
MF	(India)	Sehnaj Singh	1	18
MF	(India)	Bikramjit Singh	1	18
DF	(Nigeria)	Bello Razaq	1	20
TOTAL			33	20

Last updated: 31 May 2015
Source: Matches

==== Disciplinary record ====
Pos.	Nat.	Player	Yellow card	(yellow card) (yellow-red card)	Red card	Notes
FW	(India)	Balwant Singh	3	0	1	Missed Match: vs Pune (25 April 2015); Missed Match: vs Mumbai (2 May 2015)
MF	(India)	Sehnaj Singh	3	0	1	Missed Match: vs East Bengal (28 March 2015); Missed Match: vs Salgaocar (3 April 2014)
MF	(Haiti)	Sony Norde	3	0	1	Missed Match: vs Dempo (22 March 2015)
MF	(India)	Bikramjit Singh	1	1	0	Missed Match: vs Shillong Lajong (8 April 2015)
MF	(India)	Denson Devadas	3	0	0	
DF	(India)	Kingshuk Debnath	3	0	0	
FW	(Cameroon)	Pierre Boya	1	0	0	
MF	(India)	Souvik Chakraborty	1	0	0	
MF	(Japan)	Katsumi Yusa	1	0	0	
DF	(India)	Anwar Ali	1	0	0	
DF	(India)	Pritam Kotal	1	0	0	
DF	(India)	Sukhen Dey	1	0	0	
GK	(India)	Shilton Pal	1	0	0	

Last updated: 31 May 2015
Source: Matches

== Player statistics ==
=== Appearances and goals ===
No.	Pos	Nat	Player	Total		CFL		King's Cup		Fed Cup		I-League	
No.	Pos	Nat	Player	Apps	Goals	Apps	Goals	Apps	Goals	Apps	Goals	Apps	Goals
	GK	(India) IND	Shilton Pal	15	0	5+0	0	0+0	0	4+0	0	6+0	0
	GK	(India) IND	Debjit Majumder	23	0	5+0	0	4+0	0	0+0	0	14+0	0
	DF	(Nigeria) NGR	Bello Razaq	24	1	0+0	0	0+0	0	4+0	0	20+0	1
	DF	(India) IND	Anwar Ali	10	0	0+0	0	0+0	0	3+0	0	7+0	0
	DF	(India) IND	Pritam Kotal	21	2	0+0	0	0+0	0	3+1	0	16+1	2
	DF	(India) IND	Dhanachandra Singh	19	2	5+0	0	0+0	0	0+0	0	14+0	2
	DF	(India) IND	Kingshuk Debnath	24	1	5+0	0	0+0	0	2+0	1	16+1	0
	DF	(India) IND	Shouvik Ghosh	30	0	5+1	0	15+3	0	4+0	0	1+1	0
	DF	(India) IND	Sukhen Dey	15	0	5+1	0	3+1	0	1+0	0	4+0	0
	DF	(India) IND	Johny Routh	8	0	5+0	0	3+0	0	0+0	0	0+0	0
	DF	(India) IND	Satish Singh	11	0	8+0	0	3+0	0	0+0	0	0+0	0
	DF	(India) IND	Pratik Chaudhari	8	0	3+1	0	4+0	0	0+0	0	0+0	0
	DF	(India) IND	Sonam Bhutia	2	0	2+0	0	0+0	0	0+0	0	0+0	0
	MF	(India) IND	Manish Bhargav	10	0	1+1	0	0+0	0	0+0	0	3+5	0
	MF	(India) IND	Denson Devadas	16	1	0+0	0	0+0	0	3+0	0	11+2	1
	MF	(India) IND	Souvik Chakraborty	21	0	5+0	0	0+0	0	1+1	0	6+8	0
	MF	(India) IND	Sehnaj Singh	28	1	7+2	0	0+0	0	1+0	0	14+4	1
	MF	(India) IND	Tirthankar Sarkar	9	0	1+4	0	3+0	0	0+0	0	1+0	0
	MF	(India) IND	Lalkamal Bhowmick	18	0	4+4	0	2+2	0	2+1	0	1+2	0
	MF	(India) IND	Bikramjit Singh	23	1	2+2	0	0+0	0	0+1	0	8+10	1
	MF	(India) IND	Pankaj Moula	13	3	5+1	1	2+1	2	0+0	0	1+3	0
	MF	(Japan) JPN	Katsumi Yusa	37	8	8+1	0	4+0	1	4+0	0	20+0	7
	MF	(Haiti) HAI	Sony Norde	26	11	0+0	0	2+1	2	4+0	0	19+0	9
	MF	(India) IND	Ujjal Howladar	6	0	4+1	0	1+0	0	0+0	0	0+0	0
	MF	(India) IND	Adarsh Tamang	5	0	1+1	0	3+0	0	0+0	0	0+0	0
	MF	(India) IND	Ram Malik	3	0	0+2	0	0+0	0	0+0	0	0+1	0
	MF	(India) IND	Randeep Singh	1	0	0+0	0	0+1	0	0+0	0	0+0	0
	FW	(India) IND	Chinadorai Sabeeth	12	3	4+1	3	0+0	0	1+3	0	1+2	0
	FW	(India) IND	Jeje Lalpekhlua	19	3	4+0	2	0+0	0	1+2	0	5+7	1
	FW	(India) IND	Balwant Singh	30	13	6+3	7	0+0	0	3+1	0	16+1	6
	FW	(Cameroon) CMR	Pierre Boya ^{MP}	32	14	7+2	6	4+0	4	3+0	2	14+2	2
	DF	(Nigeria) NGR	Alao Fatai Adisa	4	0	4+0	0	0+0	0	0+0	0	0+0	0
	DF	(Brazil) BRA	Alex Silveira	3	1	0+0	0	2+1	1	0+0	0	0+0	0

- Source: mohunbaganac.com

Last Updated: 31 May 2015
Apps: (Matches Started)+(Substitute Appearances)

=== Disciplinary record ===
Pos.	Nat.	Player	CFL			King's Cup			Fed Cup			I-League			Total			Notes
Pos.	Nat.	Player	Yellow card	(yellow card) (yellow-red card)	Red card	Yellow card	(yellow card) (yellow-red card)	Red card	Yellow card	(yellow card) (yellow-red card)	Red card	Yellow card	(yellow card) (yellow-red card)	Red card	Yellow card	(yellow card) (yellow-red card)	Red card	Notes
MF	(India)	Sehnaj Singh	3	0	0	2	0	0	0	0	0	3	0	1	8	0	1	Missed Match: vs Bengal Nagpur Railway (9 September 2014); Missed Match: vs East Bengal (28 March 2015); Missed Match: vs Salgaocar (3 April 2015)
MF	(Haiti)	Sony Norde	0	0	0	1	0	0	0	0	0	3	0	1	4	0	1	Missed Match: vs Dempo (22 March 2015)
FW	(India)	Balwant Singh	0	0	0	0	0	0	0	0	0	3	0	1	3	0	1	Missed Match: vs Pune (25 April 2015); Missed Match: vs Mumbai (2 May 2015)
MF	(India)	Tirthankar Sarkar	0	0	0	0	0	0	0	0	0	0	0	1	0	0	1	Missed Match: vs Nakhon Ratchasima (25 November 2014)
MF	(India)	Bikramjit Singh	0	0	0	0	0	0	0	0	0	1	1	0	1	1	0	Missed Match: vs Shillong Lajong (8 April 2015)
MF	(Japan)	Katsumi Yusa	3	0	0	1	0	0	0	0	0	1	0	0	5	0	0	Missed Match: vs Bengal Nagpur Railway (9 September 2014)
DF	(India)	Kingshuk Debnath	1	0	0	0	0	0	0	0	0	3	0	0	4	0	0	
DF	(India)	Shouvik Ghosh	2	0	0	0	0	0	2	0	0	0	0	0	4	0	0	Missed Match: vs East Bengal (31 August 2014); Missed Match: vs Salgaocar (4 January 2015)
FW	(Cameroon)	Pierre Boya	0	0	0	2	0	0	0	0	0	1	0	0	3	0	0	
MF	(India)	Denson Devadas	0	0	0	0	0	0	0	0	0	3	0	0	3	0	0	
MF	(India)	Souvik Chakraborty	1	0	0	0	0	0	0	0	0	1	0	0	2	0	0	
DF	(India)	Satish Singh	1	0	0	1	0	0	0	0	0	0	0	0	2	0	0	
FW	(India)	Chinadorai Sabeeth	1	0	0	0	0	0	0	0	0	0	0	0	1	0	0	
MF	(India)	Lalkamal Bhowmick	0	0	0	0	0	0	1	0	0	0	0	0	1	0	0	
DF	(Nigeria)	Bello Razaq	0	0	0	0	0	0	1	0	0	0	0	0	1	0	0	
DF	(India)	Anwar Ali	0	0	0	0	0	0	0	0	0	1	0	0	1	0	0	
DF	(India)	Pritam Kotal	0	0	0	0	0	0	0	0	0	1	0	0	1	0	0	
DF	(India)	Dhanachandra Singh	1	0	0	0	0	0	0	0	0	0	0	0	1	0	0	
DF	(India)	Sukhen Dey	0	0	0	0	0	0	0	0	0	1	0	0	1	0	0	
DF	(India)	Johny Routh	1	0	0	0	0	0	0	0	0	0	0	0	1	0	0	
DF	(India)	Pratik Chaudhari	0	0	0	1	0	0	0	0	0	0	0	0	1	0	0	
DF	(Nigeria)	Alao Fatai Adisa	1	0	0	0	0	0	0	0	0	0	0	0	1	0	0	
DF	(Brazil)	Alex Silveira	0	0	0	1	0	0	0	0	0	0	0	0	1	0	0	
GK	(India)	Shilton Pal	0	0	0	0	0	0	0	0	0	1	0	0	1	0	0	
GK	(India)	Debjit Majumder	0	0	0	1	0	0	0	0	0	0	0	0	1	0	0	

Last updated: 31 May 2015
Source: Matches

== Competitions ==
=== Overall ===
Competition	Started round	Current position / round	Final position / round	First match	Last match
Calcutta Football League	–	–	2nd	11 August 2014	15 September 2014
King's Cup	Group stage	–	Semi finals	22 November 2014	30 November 2014
Federation Cup	Group stage	–	Group stage	30 December 2014	6 January 2015
I-League	–	–	1st	18 January 2015	31 May 2015

Last Updated: 31 May 2015
Source: Competitions

=== Overview ===
Competition	Record							
Competition	Pld	W	D	L	GF	GA	GD	Win %
Calcutta Football League	10	8	0	2	19	9	+10	80.00
King's Cup	4	1	1	2	10	9	+1	25.00
Federation Cup	4	1	2	1	3	5	−2	25.00
I-League	20	11	6	3	33	16	+17	55.00
Total	38	21	9	8	65	39	+26	55.26

Last updated: 31 May 2015
Source: Competitions

=== Calcutta Football League ===
Pos	Team	Pld	W	D	L	GF	GA	GD	Pts	Qualification or relegation
1	East Bengal (C)	10	8	1	1	27	8	+19	25	Champion
2	Mohun Bagan	10	8	0	2	19	9	+10	24	
3	Tollygunge Agragami	10	7	1	2	24	7	+17	22	
4	Mohammedan	10	6	2	2	17	12	+5	20	
5	Army XI	10	6	1	3	19	13	+6	19	

Source: Soccerway
(C) Champions

=== King's Cup ===
==== Group stage ====
Team	Pld	W	D	L	GF	GA	GD	Pts
(Bangladesh) Sheikh Jamal Dhanmondi	3	2	1	0	8	3	+5	7
(India) Mohun Bagan	3	1	1	1	9	8	+1	4
(Thailand) Nakhon Ratchasima	3	1	1	1	5	3	+2	4
(Bhutan) Druk United	3	0	1	2	3	11	−8	1

==== Semi finals ====
Team 1	Score	Team 2
Pune (India)	1–1 (a.e.t.) (6–5 p)	(India) Mohun Bagan
Dhanmondi (Bangladesh)	2–1 (a.e.t.)	(Nepal) Manang Marshyangdi

=== Federation Cup ===
==== Group stage ====
Team	Pld	W	D	L	GF	GA	GD	Pts
Bengaluru FC	4	3	1	0	6	3	+3	10
Salgaocar	4	3	0	1	11	6	+5	9
Mohun Bagan	4	1	2	1	3	5	−2	5
Pune	4	1	1	2	6	7	−1	4
Shillong Lajong	4	0	0	4	2	7	−5	0

=== I-League ===
Pos	Team	Pld	W	D	L	GF	GA	GD	Pts	Qualification or relegation
1	Mohun Bagan (C)	20	11	6	3	33	16	+17	39	Qualification for AFC Champions League qualifying play-off
2	Bengaluru	20	10	7	3	35	19	+16	37	Qualification for AFC Cup group stage (Note: Bengaluru FC, as the winner of 2014–15 Federation Cup, qualified for the 2016 AFC Cup)
3	Royal Wahingdoh	20	8	6	6	27	27	0	30	
4	East Bengal	20	8	5	7	30	28	+2	29 (Note: East Bengal ahead on goal difference, head-to-head record being the same; Pune 2–3 East Bengal East Bengal 1–2 Pune)	
5	Pune	20	8	5	7	24	26	−2	29	

Source: IndiaFooty.com
Rules for classification: 1) points; 2) head-to-head points; 3) head-to-head goal difference; 4) goal difference; 5) number of goals scored; 6) play-off match.
(C) Champions

=== Results summary ===
Overall								Home						Away					
Pld	W	D	L	GF	GA	GD	Pts	W	D	L	GF	GA	GD	W	D	L	GF	GA	GD
38	21	9	8	65	39	+26	72	18	1	3	45	17	+28	3	8	5	20	22	−2

== Matches ==
=== Calcutta Football League ===
11 August 2014 1	Mohun Bagan	1–0	Tollygunge Agragami	Kolkata
16:00 IST	Jeje 43' (pen.); S.Ghosh (yellow card) 84'	Report		Stadium: Salt Lake Stadium

17 August 2014 2	Mohun Bagan	3–0	Police A.C.	Kolkata
16:00 IST	Jeje 10'; Sabeeth 12'; Balwant 72' (pen.)	Report		Stadium: Salt Lake Stadium

20 August 2014 3	Mohun Bagan	2–0	Kalighat M.S.	Kolkata
16:00 IST	Boya 24'; Balwant 26'; Souvik (yellow card) 39'; Sehnaj (yellow card) 56'; Sabeeth (yellow card) 66'	Report		Stadium: Salt Lake Stadium

24 August 2014 4	Mohun Bagan	1–2	Mohammedan	Kolkata
16:00 IST	Sabeeth 24'; S.Ghosh (yellow card) 60'; Kingshuk (yellow card) 61'	Report	Adelaja 44'; S.Kumar 61'	Stadium: Salt Lake Stadium

31 August 2014 5	Mohun Bagan	1–3	East Bengal	Kolkata
16:00 IST	Sabeeth 21'; Fatai (yellow card) 13'; D.Singh (yellow card) 54'	Report	Ranti 14' (pen.), 50'; Abranches 45'	Stadium: Salt Lake Stadium

3 September 2014 6	Mohun Bagan	1–0	SAI Darjeeling	Kolkata
16:00 IST	Moula 88'; Yusa (yellow card) 54'	Report		Stadium: Salt Lake Stadium

6 September 2014 7	Mohun Bagan	1–0	Techno Aryan	Barasat
16:00 IST	Boya 74'; Satish (yellow card) 45'; Yusa (yellow card) 58'; Sehnaj (yellow card) 90'	Report		Stadium: Barasat Stadium

9 September 2014 8	Mohun Bagan	2–1	Bengal Nagpur Railway	Kolkata
16:00 IST	Balwant 7'; Boya 74'	Report	Kazeem 80'	Stadium: Salt Lake Stadium

12 September 2014 9	Mohun Bagan	4–2	Army XI	Kolkata
16:00 IST	Balwant 11', 22', 65'; Boya 76'; Routh (yellow card) 25'; Yusa (yellow card) 58'; Sehnaj (yellow card) 90'	Report	Santu] 27', 33'	Stadium: Salt Lake Stadium

15 September 2014 10	Mohun Bagan	3–1	Southern Samity	Kolkata
16:30 IST	Boya 7', 23'; Balwant 17'	Report	Stanley 66'	Stadium: Salt Lake Stadium

=== King's Cup ===
22 November 2014 Group stage	Druk United (Bhutan)	3–3	(India) Mohun Bagan	Thimphu
15:00 BTT	Chencho 22', 90+4'; Jigme 76'	Report	Alex 45+1'; Boya 55'; Norde 71'; Tirthankar (red card) 78'; Lalkamal (yellow card) 80'; Sehnaj (yellow card) 88'	Stadium: Changlimithang Stadium

25 November 2014 Group stage	Mohun Bagan (India)	3–0	(Thailand) Nakhon Ratchasima	Thimphu
19:00 BTT	Norde 9', (yellow card) 47'; Boya 54', 85', (yellow card) 20'; Satish (yellow card) 31'; Debjit (yellow card) 35'; Yusa (yellow card) 48'	Report		Stadium: Changlimithang Stadium

27 November 2014 Group stage	Mohun Bagan (India)	3–5	(Bangladesh) Dhanmodi	Thimphu
17:00 BTT	Moula 56'; Yusa 58'; Boya 90+3'; Pratik (yellow card) 37'; Alex (yellow card) 87'	Report	Darlington 5', 54'; Darboe 16', 63'; Wedson 31' (pen.)	Stadium: Changlimithang Stadium

30 November 2014 Semi finals	Pune (India)	1–1 (a.e.t.) (6–5 p)	(India) Mohun Bagan	Thimphu
16:00 BTT	Thorat 39'	Report	Moula 25'; Sehnaj (yellow card) 10'; Lalkamal (yellow card) 20'; Boya (yellow card) 83'	Stadium: Changlimithang Stadium
	Penalties
	Sueoka (penalty scored); Luciano (penalty scored); Arata (penalty scored); Fanai (penalty scored); Balan (penalty scored); Anas (penalty scored)		Boya (penalty scored); Yusa (penalty scored); Randeep (penalty scored); Tirthankar (penalty scored); Lalkamal (penalty scored); Pratik (penalty missed)

=== Federation Cup ===
30 December 2014 Group stage	Bengaluru FC	0–0	Mohun Bagan	Vasco
16:00 IST		Report	S.Ghosh (yellow card) 66'; Bello (yellow card) 71'	Stadium: Tilak Maidan

1 January 2015 Group stage	Pune	1–1	Mohun Bagan	Vasco
16:00 IST	Sueoka 66' (pen.)	Report	Boya 26'; Lalkamal (yellow card) 58'; S.Ghosh (yellow card) 65'	Stadium: Tilak Maidan

4 January 2015 Group stage	Salgaocar	4–1	Mohun Bagan	Vasco
16:00 IST	Douhou 35', 89'; Kasonde 77'; C.Dias 90+1'	Report	Boya 28'	Stadium: Tilak Maidan

6 January 2015 Group stage	Shillong Lajong	0–1	Mohun Bagan	Vasco
16:00 IST		Report	Kingshuk 74'	Stadium: Tilak Maidan

=== I-League ===
18 January 2015 1	Mohun Bagan	3–1	Mumbai	Kolkata
16:30 IST	Yusa 13', 69'; Norde 25', (yellow card) 64'; Shilton (yellow card) 45+1'; Denson (yellow card) 72'	Report	Josimar 20', (yellow card) 42'; Mohanraj (yellow card) 31'; Sawant (red card) 88'	Stadium: Salt Lake Stadium; Referee: T.Nagvenkar

28 January 2015 3	Salgaocar	0–0	Mohun Bagan	Margao
16:30 IST	Mendes (yellow card) 64'	Report	Balwant (yellow card) 50'	Stadium: Jawaharlal Nehru Stadium; Referee: M.V.Santosh Kumar

8 February 2015 5	Mohun Bagan	1–0	Pune	Kolkata
16:30 IST	Kotal 77'; Denson (yellow card) 20'	Report	Sueoka (yellow card) 16'; Ganesh (yellow card) 35'; Nikač (yellow card) 63'	Stadium: Salt Lake Stadium; Referee: B.Balasubramaniam

17 February 2015 2	East Bengal	1–1	Mohun Bagan	Kolkata
19:00 IST	Ranti Martins 31'; Mehtab (yellow card) 33'; Dudu (yellow card) 62'	Report	Pierre Boya 24'; B.Singh (yellow card) 25'; Kotal (yellow card) 39'	Stadium: Salt Lake Stadium; Referee: P.Singh

20 February 2015 6	Mohun Bagan	4–1	Bengaluru FC	Kolkata
19:00 IST	Norde 31', 76'; Yusa 86'; B.Singh 90+2'; Kingshuk (yellow card) 45+1'		Chhetri 7', (yellow card) 42'; Robin (yellow card) 22'; K.Pereira (yellow card) 34'; Lyngdoh (yellow card) 44'; Sampingiraj (yellow card) 66'	Stadium: Salt Lake Stadium; Referee: A.Meetei

27 February 2015 7	Shillong Lajong	3–4	Mohun Bagan	Shillong
16:30 IST	Glen 26', 63'; Uilliams 90'; Len (yellow card) 59'; Aibor (yellow card) 81'	Report	Balwant 2', 15'; Yusa 74'; Boya 82' (pen.); Kingshuk (yellow card) 45+1'; Sehnaj (yellow card) 86'	Stadium: Jawaharlal Nehru Stadium; Referee: R.Saha

4 March 2015 8	Dempo	1–1	Mohun Bagan	Margao
19:00 IST	Angus 88'; Fakruddin (yellow card) 84'	Report	Balwant 31'; Norde (red card) 45+1'	Stadium: Jawaharlal Nehru Stadium; Referee: O.Thakur

22 March 2015 11	Mohun Bagan	2–0	Dempo	Kolkata
16:30 IST	D.Singh 28'; Balwant 85'; Sehnaj (red card) 87'	Report	Jewel (yellow card) 66'; Fakruddin (yellow card) 84'; Hernández (red card) 87'	Stadium: Salt Lake Stadium; Referee: C.R.Sree Krishna

28 March 2015 12	Mohun Bagan	1–0	East Bengal	Kolkata
16:30 IST	Balwant 47'; Anwar (yellow card) 4'; Kingshuk (yellow card) 79'	Report	Khabra (yellow card) 17'; Tulunga (yellow card) 53'	Stadium: Salt Lake Stadium; Referee: M.V.Santosh Kumar

3 April 2015 13	Mohun Bagan	3–1	Salgaocar	Barasat
16:30 IST	Denson 51'; Yusa 70'; Norde 85'; B.Singh (yellow card) 79' (yellow-red card) 90+5'; Boya (yellow card) 86'	Report	Augustin 53'	Stadium: Barasat Stadium; Referee: R.Shah

8 April 2015 14	Mohun Bagan	0–0	Shillong Lajong	Barasat
16:30 IST	Norde (yellow card) 50'	Report	R.Gurung (yellow card) 36'; D.Boro (yellow card) 73'	Stadium: Barasat Stadium; Referee: O.Thakur

11 April 2015 15	Mohun Bagan	2–0	Bharat FC	Kolkata
16:30 IST	Norde 62', 69'; Yusa (yellow card) 45+1'; Balwant (yellow card) 58'	Report	Mehraj (yellow card) 80'	Stadium: Salt Lake Stadium; Referee: C.R.Sree Krishna

18 April 2015 16	Royal Wahingdoh	3–2	Mohun Bagan	Shillong
16:30 IST	Jackichand 56'; Theobald 86'; Naoba 90'; Loveday (yellow card) 23'	Report	Balwant 8', (red card) 88'; Norde 71'	Stadium: Jawaharlal Nehru Stadium; Referee: P.Singh

25 April 2015 17	Pune	0–2	Mohun Bagan	Pune
19:00 IST	Lugun (yellow card) 7'; Sueoka (yellow card) 66'; Nikač (yellow card) 28'; Ganesh (yellow card) 32'	Report	Jeje Lalpekhlua 5'; Katsumi Yusa 75'; Sehnaj (yellow card) 45'; Denson (yellow card) 48'	Stadium: Balewadi Sports Complex; Referee: B.Balasubramanium

2 May 2015 18	Mumbai	1–1	Mohun Bagan	Mumbai
19:00 IST	Vashum 49'	Report	D.Singh 76'	Stadium: Cooperage Football Stadium; Referee: S.Kumar

5 May 2015 4	Bharat FC	1–0	Mohun Bagan	Pune
19:00 IST	S.Singh 34'; Nabi (yellow card) 38'; Dowary (yellow card) 88'	Report		Stadium: Balewadi Sports Complex; Referee: A.Rowan

16 May 2015 9	Sporting Goa	2–1	Mohun Bagan	Margao
16:30 IST	Odafa 70', 87'; Antao (yellow card) 19'; Brandon (yellow card) 37'; Victorino (yellow card) 62'; R.Kumar (yellow card) 90+4'	Report	Yusa 73'; Sehnaj (yellow card) 64'	Stadium: Jawaharlal Nehru Stadium; Referee: C.R.Sree Krishna

20 May 2015 10	Mohun Bagan	2–0	Royal Wahingdoh	Barasat
19:00 IST	Kotal 36'; Norde 63', (yellow card) 86'; Souvik (yellow card) 42'	Report	Naoba (yellow card) 5'; Lalchawnkima (yellow card) 76'	Stadium: Barasat Stadium; Referee: T.Nagvenkar

23 May 2015 19	Mohun Bagan	2–0	Sporting Goa	Barasat
16:30 IST	Sehnaj 65'; Norde 77'; Sukhen (yellow card) 46'	Report	Clement (yellow card) 53'; Garcia (yellow card) 76'	Stadium: Barasat Stadium; Referee: R.Dsa

31 May 2015 20	Bengaluru FC	1–1	Mohun Bagan	Bengaluru
19:00 IST	Johnson 41'; Lyngdoh (yellow card) 32'; Robin (yellow card) 65'; Lalchhuanmawia (yellow card) 78'	Report	Bello 87'; Balwant (yellow card) 19'	Stadium: Sree Kanteerava Stadium; Referee: S.Kumar

== Notes ==
1. Sony Norde was suspended for one match instead of two matches suspension he should have received as a result of the direct red card he picked up in the match against Dempo on 4 March 2015. This decision was taken by the AIFF following Mohun Bagan and Sony Norde's appeal for the same.
