= I-League transfers for the 2014–15 season =

This is a list of Indian I-League football transfers during the 2014–15 season by club. Only I-League transfers are included.

== Bengaluru FC ==
In:

Out:

Note: Flags indicate national team as has been defined under FIFA eligibility rules. Players may hold more than one non-FIFA nationality.

No.	Pos.	Nation	Player
21	FW	IND	Udanta Singh (from (India) Tata FA)
10	MF	ENG	Josh Walker (from (England) Gateshead)
14	MF	IND	Eugeneson Lyngdoh (from (India) Rangdajied United)
23	DF	IND	Lalchhuan Mawia (from Shillong Lajong)
28	GK	IND	Lalthuammawia Ralte (from Shillong Lajong)

No.	Pos.	Nation	Player
—	FW	LBR	Johnny Menyongar (Released)
—	MF	IND	Amoes (to Mumbai F.C.)
—	MF	IND	Sampath Kuttymani (to Mumbai F.C.)

== Bharat FC ==
In:

Out:

Note: Flags indicate national team as has been defined under FIFA eligibility rules. Players may hold more than one non-FIFA nationality.

No.	Pos.	Nation	Player
—	FW	NZL	Kris Bright (from (England) Lincoln City)
—	DF	ENG	Bobby Hassell (from (England) Barnsley)
—	GK	IND	Shahinlal Meloly (Free agent)
—	MF	IND	Manjit Singh (from (India) Churchill Brothers)
—	DF	IND	Bikramjeet Singh (from (India) DSK Shivajians)
—	MF	IND	Simranjit Singh (from (India) Churchill Brothers)
—	MF	IND	Gunashekar Vignesh (from (India) South United)
—	MF	IND	Jayashelan Prasad (from (India) Bhawanipore)
—	FW	IND	Rajinder Kumar (from (India) United)
—	DF	IND	Gouramangi Singh (from (India) Chennaiyin FC)
—	GK	IND	Harshad Meher (from Sporting Goa)
—	MF	IND	Manish Mathani (from (India) FC Pune City)
—	MF	IND	Israil Gurung (from (India) FC Pune City)
—	DF	IND	Mehrajuddin Wadoo (from (India) FC Pune City)
—	FW	IND	Subhash Singh (from (India) Mumbai City FC)
—	MF	IND	Adil Khan (from (India) Delhi Dynamos FC)
—	MF	IND	Lester Fernandez (from (India) Atletico de Kolkata)
—	DF	IND	Nallappan Mohanraj (from (India) Atletico de Kolkata)
—	DF	IND	Dharmaraj Ravanan (from (India) FC Pune City)

== Dempo ==
In:

Out:

Note: Flags indicate national team as has been defined under FIFA eligibility rules. Players may hold more than one non-FIFA nationality.

No.	Pos.	Nation	Player
—	FW	IND	Uttam Rai (Free Agent)
—	MF	IND	Vinit Rai (from (India) Tata FA)
—	DF	IND	Rowilson Rodrigues (from Mohun Bagan)
—	MF	IND	Lenny Rodrigues (from (India) Churchill Brothers)
—	DF	ENG	Calum Angus (from (India) Pune FC)
—	MF	CRC	Carlos Hernandez (from (Costa Rica) Cartaginés)
—	MF	IND	Francis Fernandes (from (India) Delhi Dynamos FC)

No.	Pos.	Nation	Player
—	FW	IND	Jeje Lalpekhlua (to Mohun Bagan)
—	DF	IND	Creson Antao (to Sporting Goa)
—	GK	IND	Tyson Caiado (to East Bengal)
—	DF	IND	Jessel Carneiro (to Pune)

== East Bengal ==
In:

Out:

Note: Flags indicate national team as has been defined under FIFA eligibility rules. Players may hold more than one non-FIFA nationality.

No.	Pos.	Nation	Player
—	DF	IND	Baidyanath Das (from (India) Tata FA)
—	MF	IND	Deepak Tirkey (from (India) Tata FA)
—	FW	IND	Manash Sarkar (from (India) Tata FA)
—	FW	NGR	Ranti Martins (from (India) United)
—	DF	IND	Deepak Mondal (from (India) United)
—	MF	IND	Mohammed Rafique (from (India) United)
—	GK	IND	Luis Barreto (from (India) Mohammedan)
—	DF	IND	R Dhanarajan (from (India) Mohammedan)
—	GK	IND	Dibyendu Sarkar (from (India) United Sikkim)
—	GK	IND	Sandip Kumar Pal (from (India) IFA Football Academy)
—	DF	IND	Souvik Bal (from (India) Southern Samity)
—	DF	IND	Amit Chakraborty (from (India) George Telegraph)
—	MF	IND	Abinash Ruidas (from (India) Bhawanipore)
—	MF	IND	Baldeep Singh (from (India) United)
—	MF	IND	Vivekananda Banerjee (from (India) George Telegraph)
—	MF	IND	Anthony Soren (from (India) Mohammedan)
—	MF	IND	Prahlad Roy (from (India) Mohun Bagan SAIL Football Academy)
—	MF	NZL	Leo Bertos (from (Australia) Wellington Phoenix)
—	MF	IND	Sukhwinder Singh (Free agent)
—	GK	IND	Tyson Caiado (from Dempo)
—	FW	NGR	Dudu Omagbemi (from Salgaocar)
—	DF	AUS	Milan Susak (from (United Arab Emirates) Al-Wasl)
—	GK	IND	Subhasish Roy Chowdhury (from Atletico de Kolkata)

No.	Pos.	Nation	Player
—	FW	IND	Seminlen Doungel (to Shillong Lajong)
—	FW	NGR	Chidi Edeh (Released)
—	DF	IND	Naoba Singh (to IMG RELIANCE)
—	GK	IND	Gurpreet Singh Sandhu (to (Norway) Stabæk Fotball)
—	MF	IND	Reisangmei Vashum (to Mumbai F.C.)

== Mohun Bagan ==
In:

Out:

Note: Flags indicate national team as has been defined under FIFA eligibility rules. Players may hold more than one non-FIFA nationality.

No.	Pos.	Nation	Player
—	DF	IND	Dhanachandra Singh (from (India) United)
—	MF	IND	Lalkamal Bhowmick (from (India) United)
—	MF	IND	Souvik Chakraborty (from (India) United)
24	GK	IND	Debjit Majumder (from (India) Bhawanipore)
—	DF	IND	Johny Routh (from (India) Bhawanipore)
—	FW	IND	Jeje Lalpekhlua (from Dempo)
—	DF	IND	Satish Singh (from Churchill)
—	MF	IND	Sehnaj Singh (from Mumbai)
—	MF	IND	Tirthankar Sarkar (from Churchill Brothers)
—	GK	IND	Vinay Singh (from Shillong Lajong)
—	MF	IND	Randeep Singh (from Salgaocar F.C.)
—	DF	NGR	Alao Fatai Adisa (from (Yemen) Al-Oruba)
—	FW	CMR	Pierre Boya (from (Albania) FK Kukësi)
—	FW	IND	Balwant Singh (from (India) Churchill Brothers)
—	FW	HAI	Sony Norde (from (Bangladesh) Sheikh Jamal)
—	DF	IND	Pratik Chaudhari (from (India) Rangdajied United)
—	DF	IND	Sonam Bhutia (from (India) United Sikkim)

No.	Pos.	Nation	Player
—	FW	NGR	Odafe Onyeka Okolie (to (India) Churchill Brothers)
—	DF	IND	Rowilson Rodrigues (to Dempo)
—	MF	IND	Adil Khan (to IMG RELIANCE)
—	DF	IND	Aiborlang Khongjee (to Shillong Lajong)
—	MF	IND	Zakeer Mundampara (to Salgaocar)

== Mumbai ==
In:

Out:

Note: Flags indicate national team as has been defined under FIFA eligibility rules. Players may hold more than one non-FIFA nationality.

No.	Pos.	Nation	Player
—	MF	JPN	Taisuke Matsugae (from Shillong Lajong)
—	DF	IND	Collin Abranches (from (India) Mohammedan)
—	DF	IND	Allan Dias (from Air India)
—	DF	IND	Justin Stephen (from (India) Mohammedan)
—	DF	IND	Kali Alaudeen (Free agent)
—	FW	BRA	Josimar (from (India) Mohammedan)
—	MF	IND	Pradeep Mohanraj (Free agent)
—	DF	IND	Meldon D'Silva (from Dempo)
—	DF	SEN	Lamine Tamba (from (India) Rangdajied)
—	DF	NGR	Chika Wali (from (India) Laxmi Prasad)
21	MF	IND	Amoes (from Bengaluru FC)
—	MF	IND	Sampath Kuttymani (from Bengaluru FC)
7	MF	IND	Reisangmei Vashum (from East Bengal)
—	MF	IND	Climax Lawrence (from (India) Atletico de Kolkata)
—	FW	IND	Mohammad Rafi (from (India) Atletico de Kolkata)

No.	Pos.	Nation	Player
—	MF	IND	Sehnaj Singh (to Mohun Bagan)

== Pune ==
In:

Out:

Note: Flags indicate national team as has been defined under FIFA eligibility rules. Players may hold more than one non-FIFA nationality.

No.	Pos.	Nation	Player
—	DF	BRA	Luciano Sabrosa (from (India) Mohammedan)
—	MF	JPN	Ryuji Sueoka (from East Bengal)
—	MF	NGR	Ogba Kalu Nnanna (from Sporting Goa)
—	DF	IND	Yumnam Raju (from (India) Churchill Brothers)
—	MF	IND	Snehasish Chakraborty (from (India) United)
—	DF	IND	Jessel Carneiro (from Dempo)
—	DF	IND	Matthew Gonsalves (from Sporting Goa)
—	FW	IND	Bineesh Balan (from (India) Churchill Brothers)
—	DF	IND	Munmun Lugun (from (India) Delhi Dynamos)

No.	Pos.	Nation	Player
—	MF	CIV	Douhou Pierre (to Salgaocar)
—	MF	IND	Lester Fernandez (to IMG RELIANCE)
—	DF	IND	Gurjinder Kumar (to Salgaocar)
—	DF	IND	Othallo Tabia (to Salgaocar)

== Royal Wahingdoh ==
In:

Out:

Note: Flags indicate national team as has been defined under FIFA eligibility rules. Players may hold more than one non-FIFA nationality.

No.	Pos.	Nation	Player
—	DF	IND	Naoba Singh (from (India) Delhi Dynamos FC)
—	DF	IND	Govin Singh (from (India) Kerala Blasters FC)
—	FW	IND	Nadong Bhutia (from (India) Mumbai City FC)
—	GK	IND	Lalit Thapa (from (India) FC Pune City)
—	MF	TTO	Densill Theobald (Free agent)
—	FW	PRK	Kim Song-Yong (from (India) Rangdajied United F.C.)

No.	Pos.	Nation	Player

== Salgaocar ==
In:

Out:

Note: Flags indicate national team as has been defined under FIFA eligibility rules. Players may hold more than one non-FIFA nationality.

No.	Pos.	Nation	Player
—	MF	CIV	Douhou Pierre (from Pune)
—	FW	IND	Dawson Fernandes (from Sporting Goa)
—	GK	IND	Abhijit Das (from (India) United)
—	DF	IND	Gurjinder Kumar (from Pune)
—	DF	IND	Othallo Tabia (from Pune)
—	GK	IND	Chinmaya Behera (from (India) AIFF Elite Academy)
—	DF	IND	Pawan Kumar (from (India) AIFF Elite Academy)
—	MF	IND	Umesh Harijan (from (India) Sesa)
—	MF	IND	Zakeer Mundampara (from Salgaocar)
—	DF	IND	Thangjam Singh (from (India) Churchill Brothers)
—	DF	ZAM	Francis Kasonde (from (Israel) Hapoel Ra'anana)
—	GK	IND	Subrata Pal (from (India) Mumbai City FC)

No.	Pos.	Nation	Player
—	MF	IND	Rakesh Masih (to IMG RELIANCE)
—	MF	IND	Randeep Singh (to Mohun Bagan)
—	MF	IND	Milagres Gonsalves (to IMG RELIANCE)
—	MF	IND	Francis Fernandes (Released)
—	FW	NGR	Dudu Omagbemi (to East Bengal)

== Shillong Lajong ==
In:

Out:

Note: Flags indicate national team as has been defined under FIFA eligibility rules. Players may hold more than one non-FIFA nationality.

No.	Pos.	Nation	Player
—	FW	IND	Seminlen Doungel (from East Bengal)
—	MF	IND	David Ngaihte (from (India) Rangdajied United)
—	MF	IND	Isaac Vanlalsawma (from AIFF Elite Academy)
—	MF	IND	Joseph Lalfakzuala (from AIFF Elite Academy)
—	GK	IND	Rehnesh TP (from (India) Rangdajied United)
—	DF	IND	Aiborlang Khongjee (from Mohun Bagan)
—	MF	IND	Alen Deory (from (India) AIFF Elite Academy)
—	DF	IND	Pritam Kumar Singh (from (India) AIFF Elite Academy)
—	GK	IND	Vishal Kaith (from (India) AIFF Elite Academy)
—	MF	ZAM	Kondwani Mtonga (from (Zambia) ZESCO United)
—	MF	ZAM	Isaac Chansa (from (Zambia) Zanaco)

No.	Pos.	Nation	Player
—	GK	IND	Vinay Singh (to Mohun Bagan)
—	FW	IND	Subhash Singh (to Mumbai City FC)
—	DF	IND	Lalchhuan Mawia (to Bengaluru FC)
1	GK	IND	Lalthuammawia Ralte (to Bengaluru FC)
—	MF	JPN	Taisuke Matsugae (to Mumbai)
12	DF	IND	C Lallawmzuala (to Royal Wahingdoh F.C.)

== Sporting Goa ==
In:

Out:

Note: Flags indicate national team as has been defined under FIFA eligibility rules. Players may hold more than one non-FIFA nationality.

No.	Pos.	Nation	Player
—	DF	IND	Jarmanjt Singh (from Tata FA)
—	MF	IND	Anto Xavier (from Students Union)
—	DF	IND	Kamaljit Singh (from AIFF Elite Academy)
—	MF	IND	Souvik Das (from AIFF Elite Academy)
—	MF	IND	Sumit Ghosh (from AIFF Elite Academy)
—	DF	IND	Creson Antao (from Dempo)
—	DF	ESP	Pablo Gallardo (from (Spain) Burgos CF)
—	DF	IND	Ganesh Thakur (from (India) SESA)
—	MF	IND	Glen Martin (from (India) SESA)
—	FW	IND	Oliver Cardozo (from (India) SESA)
—	FW	TTO	Anthony Wolfe (from (India) Churchill Brothers)
—	GK	IND	Sandip Nandy (from (India) Kerala Blasters FC)
—	DF	IND	Biswajit Saha (from (India) Atletico de Kolkata)

No.	Pos.	Nation	Player
—	FW	IND	Dawson Fernandes (to Salgaocar)
—	DF	IND	Deepak Devrani (to IMG RELIANCE)
—	MF	NGR	Ogba Kalu Nnanna (Released)
—	MF	IND	Valerio Rodrigues (Released)
—	DF	IND	Matthew Gonsalves (to Pune)
—	GK	IND	Harshad Meher (to Bharat FC)
