= 2014 King's Cup (Bhutan) =

Tournament details
- Host country: Bhutan
- Dates: 15 November–2 December
- Teams: 9 (from 5 nations)
- Venue: 1 (in 1 host city)

Final positions
- Champions: (Bangladesh) Sheikh Jamal Dhanmondi (1st title)
- Runners-up: (India) Pune

Tournament statistics
- Matches played: 19
- Goals scored: 61 (3.21 per match)
- Top scorer(s): (The Gambia) Landing Darboe (Cameroon) Pierre Boya (4 goals each)

The 2014 King's Cup is a football tournament that took place from 15 November 2014 to 2 December 2014. The tournament was held in Thimphu, Bhutan at the Changlimithang Stadium. Sheikh Jamal Dhanmondi Club won the championship.

== Venue ==
Thimphu
Changlimithang Stadium	2014 King's Cup (Bhutan) (Bhutan)
Capacity: 30,000	2014 King's Cup (Bhutan) (Bhutan)

== Group stage ==
The nine participants were divided into two groups. The top two teams for each group qualified for the semifinals. Osotspa F.C. of Thailand was set to participate at the tournament and was included in Group B. Osotspa withdrew and was replaced by Pune F.C. of India.

=== Group A ===
Team	Pld	W	D	L	GF	GA	GD	Pts
(Bangladesh) Sheikh Jamal Dhanmondi	3	2	1	0	8	3	+5	7
(India) Mohun Bagan	3	1	1	1	9	8	+1	4
(Thailand) Nakhon Ratchasima	3	1	1	1	5	3	+2	4
(Bhutan) Druk United	3	0	1	2	3	11	−8	1

15 November 2014
16:00

Druk United (Bhutan)	0–3	(Bangladesh) Sheikh Jamal Dhanmondi
	Report	Darboe 25'; Anselme (?); Rubel Miya 90'

Changlimithang Stadium
17 November 2014
17:00

Druk United (Bhutan)	0–5	(Thailand) Nakhon Ratchasima
	Report 1, 2	Yawahab 60'; Nattawut 77'; Sarawut 80'; Parinya 83'; Tuck 90'

Changlimithang Stadium
22 November 2014
15:00

Mohun Bagan (India)	3–3	(Bhutan) Druk United
Alex 45+1'; Boya 55'; Norde 70'	Report	Chencho Gyeltshen 7', 90+4'; Jigme Dorji 76'

Changlimithang Stadium
23 November 2014
19:00

Sheikh Jamal Dhanmondi (Bangladesh)	0–0	(Thailand) Nakhon Ratchasima
	Report

Changlimithang Stadium
25 November 2014
19:00

Mohun Bagan (India)	3–0	(Thailand) Nakhon Ratchasima
Norde 8'; Boya 54', 85'	Report

Changlimithang Stadium
27 November 2014
17:00

Mohun Bagan (India)	3–5	(Bangladesh) Sheikh Jamal Dhanmondi
Moula 56'; Yusa 59'; Boya 90+3'	Report	Darlington 5', 54'; Darboe 16', 64'; Anselme 32' (pen.)

Changlimithang Stadium

=== Group B ===
Team	Pld	W	D	L	GF	GA	GD	Pts
(India) Pune	4	4	0	0	10	1	+9	12
(Nepal) Manang Marshyangdi	4	2	1	1	10	6	+4	7
(Bhutan) Ugyen Academy	4	2	0	2	6	6	0	6
(Bangladesh) Abahani	4	1	1	2	3	5	−2	4
(India) Assam Electricity	4	0	0	4	1	12	−11	0

16 November 2014
15:00

Abahani (Bangladesh)	1–0	(India) Assam Electricity
Bangoura 19'	Report

Changlimithang Stadium
16 November 2014
19:00

Manang Marshyangdi (Nepal)	1–2	(India) Pune
Rai 83'	Report	Izumi 18'; Brown 60'

Changlimithang Stadium
18 November 2014
17:00

Abahani (Bangladesh)	0–1	(Bhutan) Ugyen Academy
	Report	Tshering Wangdi 86'

Changlimithang Stadium
19 November 2014
17:00

Assam Electricity (India)	1–2	(Nepal) Manang Marshyangdi
Rai 37'	Report	Dodoz 35'; Shrestha 38'

Changlimithang Stadium
20 November 2014
17:00

Pune (India)	1–0	(Bhutan) Ugyen Academy
Sueoka 13'	Report

Changlimithang Stadium
22 November 2014
19:00

Abahani (Bangladesh)	2–2	(Nepal) Manang Marshyangdi
Nasir 30'; Bangoura 37'	Report	Gurung 51'; Rai B 82'

Changlimithang Stadium
23 November 2014
15:00

Assam Electricity (India)	0–5	(India) Pune
	Report	Izumi 14'; Haokip 20', 29', 67'; Rocha 85'

Changlimithang Stadium
24 November 2014
17:00

Manang Marshyangdi (Nepal)	5–1	(Bhutan) Ugyen Academy
Shrestha 24'; Dodoz 36', 57'; Gurung 51'; Aba 79'	Report	Lhendrup Dorji 90+2' (pen.)

Changlimithang Stadium
25 November 2014
15:00

Pune (India)	2–0	(Bangladesh) Abahani
Fanai 86'; Luciano 90' (pen.)	Report

Changlimithang Stadium
26 November 2014
17:00

Assam Electricity (India)	0–4	(Bhutan) Ugyen Academy
	Report	Tshering Wangdi 16'; Lhendrup Dorji 48' (pen.); Mipham Chophel 88'; Sonam Yesor 90+3'

Changlimithang Stadium

== Knock-out stage ==
=== Semifinals ===
29 November 2014
16:00

Sheikh Jamal Dhanmondi (Bangladesh)	2–1 (a.e.t.)	(Nepal) Manang Marshyangdi
Rony 85'; Darboe 91'	Report	Aba 55'

Changlimithang Stadium
30 November 2014
16:00

Pune (India)	1–1	(India) Mohun Bagan
Thorat 38'	Report	Moula 24'
Penalties
Sueoka (penalty scored); Luciano (penalty scored); Izumi (penalty scored); Fanai (penalty scored); Balan (penalty scored); Edathodika (penalty scored)	6–5	Boya (penalty scored); Yusa (penalty scored); R. Singh (penalty scored); Sarkar (penalty scored); Bhowmick (penalty scored); Chaudhari (penalty missed)

Changlimithang Stadium

=== Final ===
2 December 2014
17:00

Sheikh Jamal Dhanmondi (Bangladesh)	1–0	(India) Pune
Khan 25'	Report

Changlimithang Stadium
Referee: Sudis Pandey (Nepal)

== Awards ==
2014 King's Cup Champions
(Bangladesh)
Sheikh Jamal Dhanmondi
First title

== Top scorers ==
Rank	Player	Club	Goals
1	(The Gambia) Landing Darboe	(Bangladesh) Sheikh Jamal Dhanmondi	4
1	(Cameroon) Pierre Boya	(India) Mohun Bagan	4
2	(Ivory Coast) Ziakhi Lenoce Dodoz	(Nepal) Manang Marshyangdi	3
2	(India) Thongkhosiem Haokip	(India) Pune	3
3	(Cameroon) Cedric Aba	(Nepal) Manang Marshyangdi	2
3	(Haiti) Wedson Anselme	(Bangladesh) Sheikh Jamal Dhanmondi	2
3	(Guinea) Ismaël Bangoura	(Bangladesh) Abahani	2
3	(Nepal) Anil Gurung	(Nepal) Manang Marshyangdi	2
3	(Bhutan) Chencho Gyeltshen	(Bhutan) Druk United	2
3	(India) Arata Izumi	(India) Pune	2
3	(Haiti) Sony Norde	(India) Mohun Bagan	2
3	(Nepal) Shiva Shrestha	(Nepal) Manang Marshyangdi	2

== Team statistics ==
This table will show the ranking of teams throughout the tournament.

Pos	Team	Pld	W	D	L	GF	GA	GD
Finals
1	(Bangladesh) Sheikh Jamal Dhanmondi	5	4	1	0	11	4	+7
2	(India) Pune	6	4	1	1	11	3	+8
Semifinals
3	(Nepal) Manang Marshyangdi	5	2	1	2	11	8	+3
4	(India) Mohun Bagan	4	1	2	1	10	9	+1
Eliminated in the group stage
5	(Bhutan) Ugyen Academy	4	2	0	2	6	6	0
6	(Thailand) Nakhon Ratchasima	3	1	1	1	5	3	+2
7	(Bangladesh) Abahani	4	1	1	2	3	5	–2
8	(Bhutan) Druk United	3	0	1	2	3	11	–8
9	(India) Assam Electricity	4	0	0	4	1	12	–11
