= 2014–15 Indian Federation Cup group stage =

The group of stage of 2014–15 Indian Federation Cup took place between 28 November 2014 and 6 January 2015.

== Group A ==
Team	Pld	W	D	L	GF	GA	GD	Pts
Dempo	4	3	1	0	8	2	+6	10
Sporting Goa	4	2	0	2	7	9	−2	6
East Bengal	4	1	1	2	4	5	−1	4
Royal Wahingdoh	4	1	1	2	4	5	−1	4
Mumbai	4	1	1	2	2	4	−2	4

28 December 2014
19:00 IST

Mumbai	1–2	Royal Wahingdoh
Josimar 71'	Report	Singh 34', 59'

Fatorda Stadium, Goa
29 December 2014
19:00 IST

Dempo	1–0	East Bengal
Fernandes 40'	Report

Fatorda Stadium, Goa
30 December 2014
19:00 IST

Mumbai	1–0	Sporting Goa
Kuttymani 45+2'	Report

Fatorda Stadium, Goa
31 December 2014
19:00 IST

Royal Wahingdoh	0–1	East Bengal
	Report	Dudu 90+6'

Fatorda Stadium, Goa
1 January 2015
19:00 IST

Dempo	4–1	Sporting Goa
Özbey 11', 37' (pen.), 53' (pen.); Fernandes 83'	Report	D'Mello 77'

Fatorda Stadium, Goa
2 January 2015
19:00 IST

Mumbai	0–0	East Bengal
	Report

Fatorda Stadium, Goa
4 January 2015
19:00 IST

Sporting Goa	2–1	Royal Wahingdoh
Wolfe 53'; Saha 89'	Report	Singh 29'

Fatorda Stadium, Goa
5 January 2015
19:00 IST

Dempo	2–0	Mumbai
Miranda 15'; Fernandes 33'	Report

Fatorda Stadium, Goa
6 January 2015
19:00 IST

East Bengal	3–4	Sporting Goa
Martins 6' (pen.); Dudu 31'; Malsawmtluanga 36'	Report	Fernandes 1', 67', 78'; Wolfe 45+2'

Fatorda Stadium, Goa
7 January 2015
19:00 IST

Royal Wahingdoh	1–1	Dempo
Bewar 36'	Report	Fernandes 90+1'

Fatorda Stadium, Goa

== Group B ==
Team	Pld	W	D	L	GF	GA	GD	Pts
Bengaluru FC	4	3	1	0	6	3	+3	10
Salgaocar	4	3	0	1	11	6	+5	9
Mohun Bagan	4	1	2	1	3	5	−2	5
Pune	4	1	1	2	6	7	−1	4
Shillong Lajong	4	0	0	4	2	7	−5	0

28 December 2014
16:00 IST

Bengaluru FC	3–2	Salgaocar
Chhetri 25' (pen.), 40'; Rooney 45'	Report	Gurjinder 33'; Douhou 41'

Tilak Maidan Stadium, Goa
29 December 2014
16:00 IST

Pune	3–1	Shillong Lajong
D'Souza 45+2'; Izumi 66'; Brown 90+2'	Report	Lalrammuana 12'

Tilak Maidan Stadium, Goa
30 December 2014
16:00 IST

Bengaluru FC	0–0	Mohun Bagan
	Report

Tilak Maidan Stadium, Goa
31 December 2014
16:00 IST

Salgaocar	2–1	Shillong Lajong
Jairu 58'; Gurjinder 64'	Report	Lalrawngbawla 90+2'

Tilak Maidan Stadium, Goa
1 January 2015
16:00 IST

Pune	1–1	Mohun Bagan
Sueoka 66' (pen.)	Report	Boya 26'

Tilak Maidan Stadium, Goa
2 January 2015
16:00 IST

Bengaluru FC	1–0	Shillong Lajong
Singh 50'	Report

Tilak Maidan Stadium, Goa
4 January 2015
16:00 IST

Mohun Bagan	1–4	Salgaocar
Boya 28'	Report	Pierre 35', 89'; Kasonde 77'; Dias 90+1'

Tilak Maidan Stadium, Goa
5 January 2015
16:00 IST

Pune	1–2	Bengaluru FC
Haokip 87'	Report	Chhetri 43', 45+3' (pen.)

Tilak Maidan Stadium, Goa
Referee: C.R. Srikrishna
6 January 2015
16:00 IST

Shillong Lajong	0–1	Mohun Bagan
	Report	Debnath 74'

Tilak Maidan Stadium, Goa
7 January 2015
16:00 IST

Salgaocar	3–1	Pune
Pierre 36'; Duffy 70'; Gurjinder 76'	Report	Sueoka 61'

Tilak Maidan Stadium, Goa
