= Abhijit (name) =

- Gender: Male
- Language: Sanskrit; Bengali; Hindi; Malayalam; Marathi; Nepali; Telugu; Punjabi; Maithili

Origin
- Origin: Sanskrit
- Meaning: "victorious", "conqueror"
- Region of origin: India

Other names
- Alternative spelling: Abijit, Abhijith, Abhijeet, Abhijeeth

Abhijit (or Abijit, Abhijeet or Abhijith etc.) is a masculine name common in the Indian subcontinent. The meaning of Abhijit is "victorious", "conqueror", or "he who wins" in the Sanskrit language. Abhijit is the Sanskrit name for Vega, the brightest star in the northern constellation of Lyra.

Notable people with the name include:

- Abhijit Banerjee, Indian-American economist, Nobel Laureate in Economics 2019
- Abhijit Banerjee (composer), Indian lyricist and composer
- Abhijit Bhaduri, Indian author, columnist and management consultant
- Abhijit Chowdhury, India-based independent filmmaker
- Abhijit Chakraborty, Indian cricketer
- Abhijit Das (born 1969), Indian politician & social activist
- Abhijit Deshmukh (engineer), Indian-American engineer
- Abhijit Deshmukh (umpire), cricketer umpire
- Abhijit Deshpande, Indian cricketer
- Abhijit Dey, Indian first-class cricketer who plays for Tripura
- Abhijit Guha, Indian Army officer
- Abhijit Guha (director), Indian film director, actor and writer
- Abhijit Kale, former Indian cricketer
- Abhijit Kunte, Indian chess player
- Abhijit Karambelkar, Indian cricketer
- Abhijit Kokate, Indian film editor
- Abhijit Pohankar, Indian classical keyboardist and fusion music producer
- Abhijit Mukherjee, Indian politician
- Abhijit Mondal, Indian footballer
- Abhijit Mahalanobis, Indian-American engineer
- Abhijit Sarkar (cricketer), Indian cricketer
- Abhijit Sarkar (footballer), Indian footballer
- Abhijit Salvi, Indian cricketer
- Abhijit Sen, former member of the Planning Commission of India
- Abhijit Vaghani, Indian music composer and producer
- Abhijith (actor), Indian Kannada-language actor
- Abhijith Kollam, Indian playback singer, popular in Malayalam
- Abhijith P. S. Nair, India violinist
- Abhijeet Chavan, Indian actor who works in Marathi and Hindi films
- Abhijeet Gupta, Indian chess player
- Abhijeet Singh Sanga, Indian politician
- Abhijeet Bhattacharya, Indian playback singer best known by his first name
- Abhijeet Gupta (born 1989), chess grandmaster
- Abhijeet Kosambi (born 1982), classical singer and winner of Sa Re Ga Ma Pa -Maharashtra cha Maha Gayak
- Abhijeet Sawant (born 1981), singer and winner of Indian Idol
- Abhijeeth Poondla, Indian actor who works in Telugu films
- Abhizeet Asom, Indian politician, chairperson of the United Liberation Front of Assam (Independent)
- Abijeet (actor), Indian actor, who works in Telugu films
