= Abhijit =

Abhijit (sometimes spelled Abhijeet) may refer to:

- Abhijit (name), an Indian male given name
- Abhijit (nakshatra), in Hindu astrology and Indian astronomy, the lunar mansion of Vega
- Abhijith (actor) (born 1963), Indian actor
- Abhijeet Bhattacharya, better known as Abhijeet, a Bollywood playback singer
