= Yona Ndabila =

Tanzanian footballer

Personal information
- Full name: Yona Elias Ndabila
- Date of birth: 11 September 1985 (age 41)
- Place of birth: Tanzania
- Position: Striker

Senior career*
Years	Team	Apps	(Gls)
–2009	Prisons Mbeya		
2009–2010	Moro United F.C.		
2010–2011	Mtibwa Sugar F.C.		
2011–2012	Kagera Sugar F.C.		
2012–2013	Saraswoti Youth Club		
2013–2014	Manang Marshyangdi Club		

International career
2008	Tanzania	1	(0)
- * Club domestic league appearances and goals

Yona Ndabila (born 11 September 1985) is a Tanzanian former professional footballer who played as a striker and made one appearance for the Tanzania national team.

== Club career ==
Released from Kagera Sugar in 2012, Ndabila finished as second top scorer in the Nepalese top tier with Saraswoti Youth Club with 16 goals, including a brace to beat Boudha 2-1, visiting his parents in Mbeya after the season's end.

Plying his trade with Manang Marshyangdi Club of the Nepalese top tier, Ndabila scored a goal to help them reach the final of the 2013 Ncell Cup in what was seen as an impeccable performance on his part. and a hat-trick in the semi-final of the 2013 Bhutan King's Cup.

== International career ==
Ndabila was capped with Tanzania national team, with one appearance against Yemen in 2008.
