= 2013 King's Cup (Bhutan) =

Tournament details
- Host country: Bhutan
- Dates: 20 July–10 August 2013
- Teams: 9
- Venue: 1 (in 1 host city)

Final positions
- Champions: (Nepal) Manang Marshyangdi (1st title)
- Runners-up: (Bhutan) Yeedzin

Tournament statistics
- Matches played: 19
- Goals scored: 65 (3.42 per match)
- Top scorer: (Tanzania) Yonah Elias Ndabila (6 goals)

The 2013 King's Cup is a football tournament that took place from 20 July to 10 August 2013. The tournament was held in Thimphu, Bhutan at the Changlimithang Stadium.

== Venue ==
Thimphu
Changlimithang Stadium	2013 King's Cup (Bhutan) (Bhutan)
Capacity: 10,000	2013 King's Cup (Bhutan) (Bhutan)

== Group stage ==
The nine participants were divided into two groups. The top two teams for each group qualified for the semifinals. Brothers Union from Bangladesh was set to participate at the tournament and was included in Group A but was replaced by Arambagh Krira Sangha, also from Bangladesh.

=== Group A ===
Team	Pld	W	D	L	GF	GA	GD	Pts
(Nepal) Manang Marshyangdi	4	4	0	0	12	1	+11	12
(Bhutan) Yeedzin	4	3	0	1	10	7	+3	9
(Nepal) Machhindra	4	1	1	2	7	6	+1	4
(India) Mohun Bagan	4	1	1	2	5	7	−2	4
(Bangladesh) Arambagh Krira Sangha	4	0	0	4	1	14	−13	0

20 July 2013
16:00

Yeedzin (Bhutan)	1–0	(Bangladesh) Arambagh Krira Sangha
Chencho Gyeltshen 22'	Report

Changlimithang Stadium
22 July 2013
18:00

Machhindra (Nepal)	1–1	(India) Mohun Bagan
Limbu 3'	Report 1, 2	Singh 5'

Changlimithang Stadium
24 July 2013
18:00

Yeedzin (Bhutan)	1–3	(Nepal) Manang Marshyangdi
Chencho Gyeltshen 60'	Report 1, 2	Ndabila 10'; D. Rai 55'; Shrestha 85'

Changlimithang Stadium
27 July 2013
16:00

Arambagh Krira Sangha (Bangladesh)	1–4	(Nepal) Machhindra
Hossen 9'	Report	Dhimal (?); Limbu 58'; Olawale (?); Rai A (?)

Changlimithang Stadium
29 July 2013
18:00

Mohun Bagan (India)	0–1	(Nepal) Manang Marshyangdi
	Report	D. Rai 55'

Changlimithang Stadium
31 July 2013
18:00

Yeedzin (Bhutan)	3–2	(Nepal) Machhindra
Chencho Gyeltshen 4'; Nungpo 85'; Yeshi Dorji 85'	Report	Rai 21'; Olawale 27'

Changlimithang Stadium
3 August 2013
16:00

Arambagh Krira Sangha (Bangladesh)	0–2	(India) Mohun Bagan
	Report	Roy 15'; Sagar 57'

Changlimithang Stadium
4 August 2013
16:00

Machhindra (Nepal)	0–1	(Nepal) Manang Marshyangdi
	Report	Rai B 86'

Changlimithang Stadium
5 August 2013
18:00

Yeedzin (Bhutan)	5–2	(India) Mohun Bagan
Sonam Yoezer 14', 77', 79'; Chencho Gyeltshen 75'; Kinley Dorji 90+4'	Report 1, 2, 3	Das 47'; Marndi 58'

Changlimithang Stadium
6 August 2013
18:00

Arambagh Krira Sangha (Bangladesh)	0–7	(Nepal) Manang Marshyangdi
	Report	Ndabila 45+2', 63' (pen.), 76'; Shrestha 67', 77', 88'; Ohja 73'

Changlimithang Stadium

=== Group B ===
Team	Pld	W	D	L	GF	GA	GD	Pts
(Nepal) Three Star	3	2	1	0	5	2	+3	7
(India) United Sikkim	3	1	1	1	3	4	−1	4
(Bhutan) Thimphu City	3	1	0	2	3	6	−3	3
(Bangladesh) Team BJMC	3	1	0	2	4	3	+1	3

21 July 2013
16:00

Three Star (Nepal)	1–1	(India) United Sikkim
Dodoz 13'	Report	Rai 39'

Changlimithang Stadium
23 July 2013
18:00

Thimphu City (Bhutan)	2–1	(Bangladesh) Team BJMC
Dawa Gyeltshen 20'; Karma Shedrup Tshering 44'	Report	Rahaman 77'

Changlimithang Stadium
25 July 2013
18:00

Thimphu City (Bhutan)	1–3	(Nepal) Three Star
Ugyen Dorji 78'	Report	Gurung 22'; Dodoz 57', 90+1'

Changlimithang Stadium
28 July 2013
16:00

Team BJMC (Bangladesh)	3–0	(India) United Sikkim
Rahman 6'; Aminur Rahman Sajib 45+2'; Gabriel 50'	Report

Changlimithang Stadium
30 July 2013
18:00

Three Star (Nepal)	1–0	(Bangladesh) Team BJMC
Gahatraj 67'	Report

Changlimithang Stadium
Referee: Laba Khatri (Nepal)
1 August 2013
18:00

United Sikkim (India)	2–0	(Bhutan) Thimphu City
Rai 13'; Chettri 28'	Report

Changlimithang Stadium

== Knock-out stage ==
=== Semifinals ===
7 August 2013
18:00

Manang Marshyangdi (Nepal)	6–2 (a.e.t.)	(India) United Sikkim
Darlami 29'; Shrestha 29'; Ndabila 100' (?); Sulav Maskey (?)	Report	Rai 62'; Bhutia 90'

Changlimithang Stadium
Attendance: 4,000+
Referee: Yeshi Gyeltshen (Bhutan)
8 August 2013
18:00

Three Star (Nepal)	0–1	(Bhutan) Yeedzin
	Report	Kechukra 62'

Changlimithang Stadium
Attendance: 5,000
Referee: Laba Khatri (Nepal

=== Final ===
10 August 2013
16:00

Manang Marshyangdi (Nepal)	4–2	(Bhutan) Yeedzin
B. Rai 33' ? 71' (o.g.); Shrestha 74'; D. Rai 90+6'	Report	Chencho Gyeltshen 5', 70'

Changlimithang Stadium

== Awards ==
2013 King's Cup Champions
(Nepal)
Manang Marshyangdi
First title

== Top scorers ==
Rank	Player	Club	Goals
1	(Tanzania) Yonah Elias Ndabila	(Nepal) Manang Marshyangdi	7
2	(Nepal) Sujal Shrestha	(Nepal) Manang Marshyangdi	6
2	(Bhutan) Chencho Gyeltshen	(Bhutan) Yeedzin	6
3	(Nepal) Deepak Rai	(Nepal) Manang Marshyangdi	3
3	(Ivory Coast) Ziakhi Lenoce Dodoz	(Nepal) Three Star	3
3	(Bhutan) Sonam Yoezer	(Bhutan) Yeedzin	3
3	(India) Bijendra Rai	(India) Mohun Bagan	3

== Team statistics ==
This table will show the ranking of teams throughout the tournament.

Pos	Team	Pld	W	D	L	GF	GA	GD
Finals
1	(Nepal) Manang Marshyangdi	6	6	0	0	22	5	+17
2	(Bhutan) Yeedzin	6	4	0	2	13	11	+2
Semifinals
3	(Nepal) Three Star	5	2	1	1	5	3	+2
4	(India) United Sikkim	4	1	1	2	5	10	-5
Eliminated in the group stage
5	(Nepal) Machhindra	4	1	1	2	7	6	+1
6	(India) Mohun Bagan	4	1	1	2	5	7	-2
7	(Bhutan) Thimphu City	3	1	0	2	3	6	-3
8	(Bangladesh) Team BJMC	3	1	0	2	4	3	+1
9	(Bangladesh) Arambagh Krira Sangha	4	0	0	4	1	14	-13
