= Ncell Cup =

- Founded: 2012; 14 years ago
- Region: Nepal
- Teams: 12 (2013)
- Current champions: Manang Marshyangdi Club (2nd title)
- Most championships: Manang Marshyangdi Club (2 titles)
- Broadcaster: Kantipur T.V.
- 2013 Ncell Cup

Ncell Cup is a football knockout tournament in Nepal. The Ncell Cup tournament, sponsored by telecommunications company Ncell, is participated by the clubs ranked under the ‘A’ division. The current holders of the tournament are Manang Marshyangdi Club who beat Boys Union Club 1-0 after extra-time in the final played at Dasarath Rangasala Stadium.

== Venue ==
The tournament is played at the Dasarath Rangasala Stadium before the start of the league season.

== Past winners ==
Year	Winners	Runners-up	Score
2012	Manang Marshyangdi Club	Ranipokhari Corner Team	6–1
2013	Manang Marshyangdi Club	Boys Union Club	1-0 (a.e.t.)

== Performance by clubs ==
Club	Winner	Runner up	Winning years
Manang Marshyangdi Club	2	0	2012, 2013
Ranipokhari Corner Team	0	1	
Boys Union Club	0	1	

== See also ==
- Ncell Women's National Football Championship
- Ncell Football
