= Ncell Football =

Ncell Football is an initiative that was introduced by the Nepal-based telecommunications firm, Ncell in 2012.

== Tournament portfolio ==
- Ncell Cup: A national-level tournament of 16 A-Division teams.
- Ncell Women's Cup: A district-level 27 team competition of the best women teams in Nepal.
- Ncell Youth Cup: A district-level U-15 tournament between 45 district teams. The tournament (alongside the Coca Cola Cup Inter-School Tournament) acts as a selection process for the SAFF U-17 Championship and the AFC U-16 Championship qualifiers.

== Football development ==
In 2012, Ncell provided a 1-year sponsorship deal to the Nepal women's national football team in its commitment to ensure that the team enters the 2014 SAFF Women's Championship. Moreover, the firm also awards a Ncell Player of the Year award through voting system of the selection of the year's best football players in Nepal.

== See more ==
- Football in Nepal
