= Abhijit Deshpande =

Indian cricketer

Personal information
- Full name: Abhijit Prakash Deshpande
- Born: February 22, 1968 (age 58); Poona, Maharashtra, India
- Batting: Right-handed

Domestic team information
- Years: Team
- 1986–1992: Maharashtra

Career statistics
Competition	FC	List A
Matches	12	2
Runs scored	628	81
Batting average	41.86	40.50
100s/50s	1/3	0/1
Top score	217	64
Balls bowled	48	12
Wickets	0	1
Bowling average	–	5.00
5 wickets in innings	0	0
10 wickets in match	0	0
Best bowling	0/3	1/5
Catches/stumpings	7/0	1/0
- Source: CricketArchive, 3 December 2025

Abhijit Prakash Deshpande (born 22 February 1968) is a former Indian cricketer who played for Maharashtra in Indian domestic cricket. He was a right-handed top-order batsman.

From Pune, Deshpande made his first-class debut in December 1986, playing against Saurashtra in the 1986–87 Ranji Trophy. He scored his maiden first-class half-century during the 1990–91 season, making 60 against Gujarat. In the 1991–92 Ranji Trophy, Deshpande scored 465 runs from six games. In the first game of the tournament, against Gujarat, he scored 217 from 329 balls opening the batting with Surendra Bhave, putting on 287 for the second wicket with Santosh Jedhe. In the tournament's quarter-final, against Haryana, he scored 86, but that was his last appearance for Maharashtra.
