= Sony Nordé =

Haitian footballer (born 1989)

Personal information
- Full name: Sony Nordé
- Date of birth: 27 July 1989 (age 37)
- Place of birth: Jérémie, Haiti
- Height: 1.76 m (5 ft 9 in)
- Positions: Attacking midfielder; winger

Team information
- Current team: Miami United

Senior career*
Years	Team	Apps	(Gls)
2008–2011	Boca Juniors B	5	(2)
2009–2010	→ San Luis B (loan)	18	(8)
2012–2013	Altamira	10	(1)
2012–2013	Sheikh Russel KC	16	(6)
2013–2014	Sheikh Jamal DC	27	(13)
2014–2019	Mohun Bagan	63	(24)
2015	→ Mumbai City (loan)	12	(3)
2016	→ Mumbai City (loan)	11	(1)
2019	Zira	11	(1)
2020–2022	Melaka United	46	(7)
2023	Terengganu	20	(5)
2024	Kedah Darul Aman	12	(2)
2025	Malut United	14	(0)
2025–	Miami United	0	(0)

International career
2011	Haiti U23	3	(1)
2007–2017	Haiti	27	(2)
- * Club domestic league appearances and goals as of 23 May 2025

Sony Nordé (born 27 July 1989) is a Haitian professional footballer who plays as an attacking midfielder or winger for Miami United.

== Club career ==
=== Boca Juniors ===
In 2009, Nordé was able to secure a spot at Argentine club Boca Juniors and played for the reserve team.

==== Loan to San Luis ====
After a trial with Mexican side San Luis, Nordé made a good impression while playing for San Luis's B team, scoring eight goals.

=== Altamira ===
In July 2012, Nordé moved to Mexican side Altamira. He make his debut on 7 January in a league match against Neza. In the next match on 15 January, Nordé scored his first goal for the club in a 3–1 lost against Lobos BUAP

=== Sheikh Russel KC ===
In July 2012, Nordé joined Bangladeshi club Sheikh Russel KC.

=== Sheikh Jamal Dhanmondi ===
In July 2013, Nordé joined another Bangladeshi club Sheikh Jamal Dhanmondi. He was named the Bangladesh Premier League MVP of 2013–14 when playing for the club. On 24 June 2014, he scored a hat-trick in a 5–2 win over Feni. From November to December 2014, he appeared with Dhanmondi at the 2014 Bhutan King's Cup and won the final, where they defeated Pune FC from India 1–0.

=== Mohun Bagan ===
In July 2014, Nordé signed for Mohun Bagan in the Indian I-League for the 2014–15 season. He was one of the best players in the I-League with nine goals and 13 assists and played a major role behind Mohun Bagan winning the I-League title on 31 May 2015. He also appeared in the 2015–16 Indian Federation Cup, in which they emerged as champions defeating Aizawl 5–0. In the 2016 AFC Cup, Nordé scored in three consecutive matches in the group stage against Maldives club Maziya S&RC in a 5–2 win, 4–0 win over Hong Kong club South China and a narrow 3–2 win over Myanmar club Yangon United.

Norde terminated his contract with Mohun Bagan in January 2018 after suffering from long-term injury in the right knee.

==== Loan to Mumbai City ====
In 2015, and 2016, Nordé was twice loaned out to Indian Super League side Mumbai City.

=== Zira ===
After being away from the game for a year, Nordé joined Azerbaijan Premier League club Zira on 17 July 2019. He make his debut on 18 August 2019 in a league match against Sabail. Nordé then score his first goal for the club on 31 August in a 1–1 draw against Sabah FK.

=== Melaka United ===
On 16 January 2020, Nordé moved to Southeast Asia to signed with Malaysia Super League club Melaka United. On his debut on 29 February, Nordé scored a goal in a 2–0 win over UiTM. He went on to make 49 appearances in all competition and scoring 9 goals.

=== Terengganu ===
On 24 November 2022, Nordé signed with Terengganu ahead of the 2023 season. He make his debut for the club on 24 February in a 2–0 lost to Sri Pahang. He scored his first goal for the club with a brace against Sabah in a 2–2 draw on 19 May. On 14 August, Nordé recorded 4 assists in an East Coast Derby match against Kelantan during a 8–0 thrashing win. Nordé also recorded 3 goals and 4 assists during the 2023–24 AFC Cup.

=== Kedah Darul Aman ===
On 22 March 2024, Nordé signed with Kedah Darul Aman where he was make as the club captain for the 2024–25 season. He make his debut for the club on 11 May in a league match against PDRM.

== International career ==
Nordé has represented the Haiti national team at youth and senior levels. He represented Haiti at the 2008 CONCACAF Men Olympic qualification tournament.

Nordé appeared in the 2008 Caribbean Cup, as Cuba withdrew early and was replaced by Haiti, but they were bowed out from the group stages. He scored his first international goal against Antigua and Barbuda on 4 December 2008 in a 1–1 draw in that tournament.

== Career statistics ==
=== Club ===
As of 23 May 2025

Club	Season	National League			Cup		League Cup		Continental		Total	
Club	Season	Division	Apps	Goals	Apps	Goals	Apps	Goals	Apps	Goals	Apps	Goals
Mohun Bagan	2014–15	I-League	19	9	7	2	0	0	0	0	26	11
Mohun Bagan	2015–16	I-League	11	5	4	3	0	0	5	3	20	11
Mohun Bagan	2016–17	I-League	15	3	5	2	0	0	4	3	24	8
Mohun Bagan	2017–18	I-League	4	2	0	0	0	0	0	0	4	2
Mohun Bagan	2018–19	I-League	14	5	0	0	0	0	0	0	14	5
Mohun Bagan	Total		63	24	16	7	0	0	9	6	88	37
Zira	2019–20	Azerbaijan Premier League	11	1	0	0	0	0	0	0	11	1
Melaka United	2020	Malaysia Super League	11	2	0	0	–		–		11	2
Melaka United	2021	Malaysia Super League	21	3	–		0	0	–		21	3
Melaka United	2022	Malaysia Super League	14	2	3	2	–		–		17	4
Melaka United	Total		46	7	3	2	0	0	–		49	9
Terengganu	2023	Malaysia Super League	20	5	2	1	0	0	0	0	22	6
Kedah Darul Aman	2024–25	Malaysia Super League	12	2	5	0	0	0	0	0	17	2
Malut United	2024–25	Liga 1	14	0	0	0	0	0	0	0	14	0
Career total			166	38	26	10	0	0	9	6	201	54

=== International ===
Appearances and goals by national team and year
National team	Year	Apps	Goals
Haiti	2007	1	0
Haiti	2008	7	1
Haiti	2009	2	0
Haiti	2010	3	1
Haiti	2011	2	0
Haiti	2012	–	
Haiti	2013	1	0
Haiti	2014	2	0
Haiti	2015	5	0
Haiti	2016	3	0
Haiti	2017	1	0
Total		27	2

Scores and results list Haiti's goal tally first, score column indicates score after each Nordé goal.

List of international goals scored by Sony Nordé
No.	Date	Venue	Opponent	Score	Result	Competition
1	4 December 2008	Jarrett Park, Montego Bay, Jamaica	Antigua and Barbuda	1–0	1–1	2008 Caribbean Cup
2	4 November 2010	Manny Ramjohn Stadium, Marabella, Trinidad and Tobago	Saint Vincent and the Grenadines	1–0	3–1	2010 Caribbean Cup qualification

== Honours ==
=== Club ===
Terengganu

- Malaysia Cup runner-up: 2023

Sheikh Jamal Dhanmondi

- Bhutan King's Cup: 2014
- IFA Shield: runner-up 2014

Mohun Bagan

- I-League: 2014–15
- Federation Cup: 2015–16

=== Individual ===
- IFA Shield Top Scorer: 2014
