= Rosario Mendes =

Indian footballer

Personal information
- Date of birth: 25 October 1989 (age 37)
- Place of birth: Cortalim, Goa, India
- Position: Midfielder

Team information
- Current team: Salgaocar
- Number: 36

Youth career
- Salgaocar

Senior career*
Years	Team	Apps	(Gls)
2013–	Salgaocar	19	(0)
- * Club domestic league appearances and goals as of 30 May 2015

Rosario Mendes (born 25 October 1989) is an Indian professional footballer who plays as a midfielder for Salgaocar in the I-League.

== Career ==
=== Salgaocar ===
Born in Cortalim, Goa, Mendes made his debut for Salgaocar F.C. in the I-League on 13 April 2013 against United Sikkim in which he came on in the 70th minute for Nicolau Colaco as Salgaocar won the match 9–0.

== Career statistics ==
As of 30 May 2015

Club	Season	League		Federation Cup		Durand Cup		AFC		Total	
Club	Season	Apps	Goals	Apps	Goals	Apps	Goals	Apps	Goals	Apps	Goals
Salgaocar	2012–13	2	0	0	0	0	0	-	-	2	0
Salgaocar	2013-14	7	0	1	0	0	0	-	-	8	0
Salgaocar	2014-15	10	0	1	0	0	0	-	-	10	0
Career total		19	0	1	0	0	0	0	0	20	0
