= Arata Izumi =

Indian footballer and coach (born 1982)

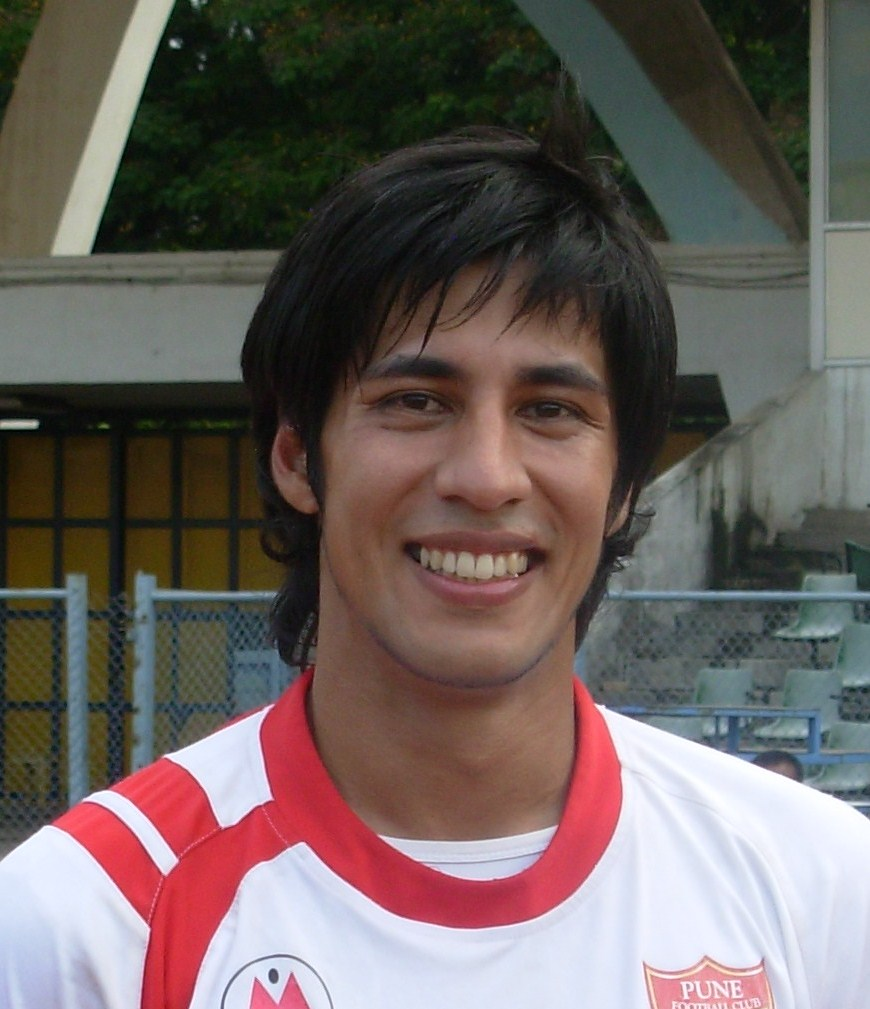
- Izumi with Pune FC in 2011

Personal information
- Full name: Arata Izumi
- Date of birth: 31 July 1982 (age 44)
- Place of birth: Shimonoseki, Japan
- Height: 1.76 m (5 ft 9 in)
- Position: Midfielder

Senior career*
Years	Team	Apps	(Gls)
2005	Albirex Niigata Singapore	22	(3)
2006	Mitsubishi Mizushima	25	(1)
2006–2007	East Bengal	14	(1)
2007–2009	Mahindra United	24	(2)
2009–2015	Pune	119	(25)
2015	→ Atlético de Kolkata (loan)	11	(5)
2016	Mumbai	13	(1)
2016	Pune City	9	(1)
2017	NEROCA		
2017–2018	Kerala Blasters	6	(0)
Total		243	(39)

International career
2013–2014	India	9	(0)

Managerial career
- 2018–2023: Reliance Foundation Young Champs
- 2023–2024: Inter Kashi (assistant)
- * Club domestic league appearances and goals

Arata Izumi (和泉 新, Izumi Arata; born 31 July 1982) is a professional football coach and former footballer who played as a midfielder. He was recently the assistant coach of I-League club Inter Kashi. Born in Japan, Izumi represented India at the international level.

Izumi began his professional career in Singapore with Albirex Niigata Singapore and in his native Japan for Mitsubishi Mizushima before moving to India in 2006. He spent the first three years in India with East Bengal and Mahindra United before spending six seasons with Pune. He then went on to play for Atlético de Kolkata, Mumbai, Pune City, and NEROCA. With NEROCA, Izumi helped the Manipuri club earn promotion to the I-League. He then ended his career playing with the Kerala Blasters.

== Club career ==
=== Albirex Niigata Singapore ===
In 2005, Izumi started his professional football career with Albirex Niigata Singapore of the S.League. Albirex Niigata Singapore was an affiliate of Albirex Niigata of the J.League. Arata grew a reputation for his speed while in the S.League. He scored his first professional goal of his career against Tampines Rovers in the S.League on 18 September 2005. He then scored his second goal of the season on 30 September 2005 against Woodlands Wellington. Arata ended the season with 22 caps in S.League with 3 goals and 2 caps in the Singapore Cup scoring 1 goal.

=== Mitsubishi Mizushima ===
In 2006, after a successful season with Albirex Niigata Singapore in which the team finished 5th in the S.League, Arata moved back to Japan and signed for Mitsubishi Motors Mizushima of the Japan Football League. While with the team Arata also worked for Mitsubishi Motors as a toso (a person of paints cars). He worked 10 hours a day from 5 in the morning to 6 in the evening with the car company and then he spent 2 hours practicing with the football team. Despite scoring 7 goals and gaining 7 assists in 24 games during the 2006 season Izumi could not stop the club finishing in 17th place, 2nd the last that season.

=== East Bengal ===
In November 2006 Izumi signed for East Bengal of the National Football League. At first he struggled to get accustomed to the Indian climate but eventually he found his way. He ended his maiden season with the club with 1 goal and 10 assists in 14 games.

=== Mahindra United ===
In 2007 Izumi signed for Mahindra United of the I-League, which replaced the old National Football League. He began the 2007–08 I-League campaign with an injury that kept him out of football for six months. He managed to come back that season, scoring 1 goal and getting 2 assists in 8 games. The next season Izumi scored 1 goal and gained 5 assists in 16 I-League games. That season Arata and Mahindra won the Durand Cup.

=== Pune ===
In 2009, Izumi signed for newly promoted I-League side Pune. Izumi has called his move to Pune as the turning point of his career. In 2010, he finished the season with a career high 10 goals and 10 assists in 26 games. He also scored an extra 6 goals in cup matches. He was the top goalscorer among all midfielders and was also nominated as the best midfielder in the I-League by goal.com. Izumi also won the Pune FC Man of Steel award from the club that season. Arata continued his good form for the club in 2010–11 scoring 6 goals and getting 9 assists in 24 games. On 22 October 2011 Izumi made his 50th appearance for the club in I-League in the opening match of the 2011–12 season against Shillong Lajong. On 24 August 2012 Izumi extended his contract by 2 years with Pune FC.

=== Atlético de Kolkata ===
In 2015 Izumi was drafted to Atlético Kolkata of the 2015 Indian Super League. He started his campaign for the side with a goal against FC Goa in a high voltage 1-1 clash on 7 October. Six days later on 13 October Izumi scored against Kerala Blasters in 2–1 win which was witnessed by a home crowd of sixty thousand Kolkata fans and legendary Pelé at Salt Lake Stadium. He returned after an injury almost a month later and produced a match winning performance against Kerala Blasters in Kochi, coming off the bench and scoring twice on 84th and 90+3 minutes with his team winning the match 3–2. His last goal came in a 2–3 defeat on 14 December against Mumbai City FC at Salt Lake Stadium on the final match of the group stage.

=== NEROCA ===
In January 2017, after playing with Pune City, Izumi signed with I-League 2nd Division side NEROCA.

=== Kerala Blasters ===
On 23 July 2017, Izumi was selected in the 6th round of the 2017–18 ISL Players Draft by the Kerala Blasters for the 2017–18 Indian Super League. He made his debut for the club during their opening match of the season on 17 November 2017 against ATK. He started and played the whole match as Kerala Blasters drew 0–0.

At the end of the season, Izumi announced his retirement from professional football on 18 July 2018.

== Style of play ==
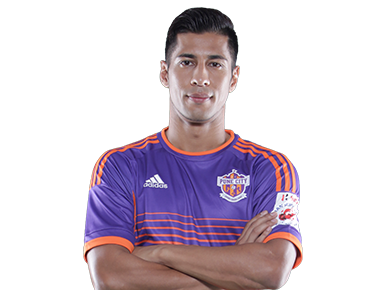
Izumi with FC Pune City in 2017

As player he can play anywhere on midfield and also as a False 9. Mostly Izumi likes to operate behind the striker or as a playmaker but also can play in as winger for his crossing abilities. Although, he has been criticized sometimes for lack of consistency throughout his career.

== International career ==
On 24 August 2012, Izumi gained Indian citizenship, giving away his Japanese passport in order to do so, thus making him eligible to play for India at the international level. Then on 29 January 2013 it was confirmed that Izumi had been called up to Wim Koevermans' side for the friendly against Palestine. Izumi then made his international debut when he came on in the 64th minute for Lenny Rodrigues as India went on to lose the match 4–2.

Since then Izumi has also been called up to India's 2014 AFC Challenge Cup qualification squad and their 2013 SAFF Championship squad.

== Coaching career ==
After retiring as a player, Izumi took up the role of youth coach with the Reliance Foundation Young Champs, the youth academy division for the Indian Super League.

In August 2023, Izumi was appointed as assistant coach of Inter Kashi, a newly founded club which is set to make their I-League debut.

== Personal life ==
Arata was born to Akiko Izumi, a Japanese mother and Narendra Khambholja, a Gujarati father. On 24 August 2012, it was officially announced by his club, Pune FC, that he has received Indian citizenship from the Government of India. Izumi also holds an Indian name, Neelkanth Khambholja.

== Career statistics ==
=== Club ===
As of 18 July 2019

Club	Season	League			League Cup		Domestic Cup		AFC		Total	
Club	Season	Division	Apps	Goals	Apps	Goals	Apps	Goals	Apps	Goals	Apps	Goals
Albirex Niigata Singapore	2005	S.League	22	3	2	1	0	0	—	—	24	4
Total			22	3	2	1	0	0	0	0	24	4
Mitsubishi Mizushima	2006	Japan Football League	24	4	8	2	0	0	—	—	32	6
Total			24	4	8	2	0	0	0	0	32	6
East Bengal	2006–07	National Football League	14	1	1	0	0	0	—	—	15	1
Total			14	1	1	0	0	0	0	0	15	1
Mahindra United	2007–08	I-League	8	1	4	0	2	0	—	—	14	1
Mahindra United	2008–09	I-League	16	1	4	0	1	0	—	—	21	1
Total			24	2	8	0	3	0	0	0	35	2
Pune	2009–10	I-League	26	10	0	0	3	1	—	—	29	11
Pune	2010–11	I-League	24	6	2	0	2	0	—	—	28	6
Pune	2011–12	I-League	21	3	0	0	3	0	—	—	24	3
Pune	2012–13	I-League	22	5	0	0	2	1	—	—	24	6
Pune	2013–14	I-League	17	1	3	0	0	0	3	0	21	1
Pune	2014–15	I-League	19	0	4	1	4	1	—	—	27	2
Total			129	25	9	1	14	3	3	0	155	29
Atlético de Kolkata	2015	Indian Super League	11	5	—	—	—	—	—	—	11	5
Total			11	5	0	0	0	0	0	0	11	5
Mumbai (loan)	2015–16	I-League	13	1	2	0	—	—	—	—	15	1
Total			13	1	2	0	0	0	0	0	13	1
Pune City	2016	Indian Super League	9	1	—	—	—	—	—	—	9	1
Total			9	1	0	0	0	0	0	0	9	1
Kerala Blasters	2017–18	Indian Super League	6	0	—	—	1	0	—	—	7	0
Total			6	0	0	0	1	0	0	0	7	0
Career total			252	42	30	4	14	2	7	1	303	49

=== International ===
As of 2014

National team	Year	Apps	Goals
India	2013	8	0
India	2014	1	0
Total		9	0

== Honours ==
India

- SAFF Championship runner-up: 2013

East Bengal

- Indian Super Cup: 2006
- Calcutta Football League: 2006

Mahindra United

- IFA Shield: 2008
- Mumbai Football League: 2007–08, 2008–09

Pune

- I-League runner-up: 2012–13; third place: 2009–10
- Durand Cup runner-up: 2014
- Bhutan King's Cup runner-up: 2014

== See also ==
- List of Indian football players in foreign leagues
- Indian naturalized football players
- List of India international footballers born outside India
