= Jigme Dorji Wangchuk Memorial Gold Cup =

- Logo used until 2014
- Founded: 2004; 22 years ago
- Current champions: Paro
- Website: bhutanfootball.org

The Jigme Dorji Wangchuk Memorial Gold Cup (formerly known as King's Cup) is an international football club tournament held in Bhutan. The inaugural edition was held in 2004, replacing the Federation Cup which was last played in 2002, which in turn has its origin traces back to its original name Jigme Dorji Wangchuck Memorial Gold Cup of the 1990s. The rebranded Jigme Dorji Wangchuck Memorial Gold Cup was revived in 2019.

== Results ==
Year	Final			Semi-finals
Year	Winners	Score	Runners-up	Semifinalist	Semifinalist
2004	(Thailand); BEC Tero Sasana	3–0	(Nepal); Manang Marshyangdi	(Bangladesh); Abahani	(Bhutan); Thimphu XI
2013	(Nepal); Manang Marshyangdi	4–2	(Bhutan); Yeedzin	(Nepal); Three Star	(India); United Sikkim
2014	(Bangladesh); Sheikh Jamal	1–0	(India); Pune	(Nepal); Manang Marshyangdi	(India); Mohun Bagan
2019	(Bhutan); Paro	1–0	(Nepal); Three Star
2020	Cancelled due to the COVID-19 pandemic

== Top scorers ==
Rank	Player	Club	Goals
2004	N/A		
2013	(Tanzania) Yona Ndabila	(Nepal) Manang Marshyangdi	7
2014	(The Gambia) Landing Darboe	(Bangladesh) Sheikh Jamal	4
2014	(Cameroon) Pierre Boya	(India) Mohun Bagan	4

== See also ==
- Bhutan Football Federation
- Football in Bhutan
- Bhutan Premier League
