= Sonam Yoezer =

Bhutanese footballer

Personal information
- Full name: Sonam Yoezer
- Date of birth: 24 October 1994 (age 32)
- Place of birth: Bhutan
- Position: Midfielder

Team information
- Current team: Thimphu City
- Number: 14

Senior career*
Years	Team	Apps	(Gls)
2013	Yeedzin		
2013–15	Ugyen Academy		
2015	Druk United		
2015–	Thimphu City		

International career
2013–	Bhutan	1	(0)
- * Club domestic league appearances and goals

Sonam Yoezer (born 24 October 1994) is a Bhutanese professional footballer, currently playing for Thimphu City. He made his first appearance for Bhutan at the age of 18, in an SAFF Cup game against Sri Lanka on 6 September 2013.

Yoezer played for Yeedzin, moving to Ugyen Academy on 31 December 2013. He then joined Druk United on 30 June 2015. He played his first AFC Cup game for Thimphu City against Club Valencia on 7 July 2017.
