= Assam State Electricity Board =

Indian statutory body

- Company type: State Statutory Body
- Industry: Electricity Generation, Electric power transmission, Electric power distribution
- Founded: 1958
- Headquarters: Guwahati, Assam, India
- Area served: Assam, India
- Products: Electricity
- Owner: Department of Power, Government of Assam
- Divisions: Assam Power Generation Corporation Limited; Assam Electricity Grid Corporation Limited; Assam Power Distribution Company Limited

The Assam State Electricity Board (ASEB) is a statutory body of the state of Assam in India. Owned by the Department of Power, Government of Assam, the ASEB manages the generation, transmission and distribution of electricity in the state of Assam with its divisions Assam Power Generation Corporation Limited, Assam Electricity Grid Corporation Limited and Assam Power Distribution Company Limited.

== History ==
The ASEB was established in 1958 in the composite state of Assam under the Electricity Act 1948. The existing Board was reconstituted in 1975 after the state was trifurcated into Assam, Meghalaya and Mizoram in 1972. Two central government entities, North Eastern Electric Power Corporation (NEEPCO) and the Power Grid Corporation of India Ltd (PGCIL) supplement the efforts of the state in power development in generation and transmission respectively.
