= 2013 Ncell Cup =

Ncell Cup 2070

Tournament details
- Country: Nepal
- Dates: 12 September – 13 October
- Teams: 12

Final positions
- Champions: Manang Marshyangdi Club
- Runners-up: Boys Union Club

Tournament statistics
- Matches played: 23
- Goals scored: 47 (2.04 per match)
- Top goal scorer: Yona Elias (4 goals)

Awards
- Best player: Ashim Jung Karki (BUC)

2013 Ncell Cup 2013, the A division knockout football tournament held in December, 2013 at Dashrath Stadium, Kathmandu, Nepal. The Second edition of the Ncell Cup tournament, sponsored by telecommunications company Ncell, will be participated by 12 clubs ranked under the ‘A’ division. Ranipokhari Corner Team withdrew from the tournament citing financial problems and were deducted 3 points in the 2013–14 league season.

== Group stage ==
Given below facts are accurate as of 2 October 2012.

=== Group A ===
Team	Pld	W	D	L	GF	GA	GD	Pts	Qualification
Nepal Army Club	2	2	0	0	4	3	+1	6	Advance to the quarter-finals
Sankata F.C.	2	0	1	1	1	2	−1	1	Advance to the quarter-finals
Jawalakhel YC	2	0	1	1	0	2	−2	1	

=== Group B ===
Team	Pld	W	D	L	GF	GA	GD	Pts	Qualification
Machhindra Football Club	2	1	1	0	3	2	+1	4	Advance to the quarter-finals
Himalayan Sherpa Club	2	1	0	1	1	2	−1	3	Advance to the quarter-finals
Friends Club	2	0	1	1	3	5	−2	1	

=== Group C ===
Team	Pld	W	D	L	GF	GA	GD	Pts	Qualification
Three Star Club	2	2	0	0	2	5	−3	6	Advance to the quarter-finals
Nepal Police Club	2	1	0	1	4	3	+1	3	Advance to the quarter-finals
APF Club	2	0	0	2	3	5	−2	0	

=== Group D ===
Team	Pld	W	D	L	GF	GA	GD	Pts	Qualification
Manang Marshyangdi Club	2	2	0	0	6	0	+6	6	Advance to the quarter-finals
Boys Union Club	2	0	1	1	1	2	−1	1	Advance to the quarter-finals
Sankata Club	2	0	0	2	0	6	−6	0	

== Matches ==
=== Quarter-final ===
9 December 2013
14:00

Nepal Army Club	5-2	Himalayan Sherpa Club
Raju Tamang 22' Tek Budhatoki 51', 71' Tanka Basnet 58', 88'		Pukar Akinade 55' Segun Akinde 75'

Dasarath Rangasala Stadium, Kathmandu
10 December 2013
14:00

Machhindra Football Club	1-2	Sankata Club
Amare Subba 78'		Ravi Gurung 37', 118'

Dasarath Rangasala Stadium, Kathmandu
11 December 2013
14:00

Three Star Club	1-2	Boys Union Club
Biraj Maharjan 39'		Binod Lama 78' Asim Jung Karki 68'

Dasarath Rangasala Stadium, Kathmandu
12 December 2013
14:00

Manang Marshyangdi Club	2-1	Nepal Police Club
Sujal Shreastha 68' Yona Elias 86'		Rabin Shrestha 29'

Dasharath Rangasala Stadium, Kathmandu

=== Semi-final ===
14 December 2013
14:00

Nepal Army Club	2-2	Boys Union Club
Sontohs Nepali 49' Nawayug Shrestha 102'		Sashi Rai 80' Binod Lama 101'
Penalties
	2 – 3

Dasarath Rangasala Stadium, Kathmandu
15 December 2013
14:00

Manang Marshyangdi Club	1-0	Sankata Club
Yona Elias 59'

Dasarath Rangasala Stadium, Kathmandu

=== Final ===
16 December 2013
14:00

Manang Marshyangdi Club	1-0	Boys Union Club
Sujal Shrestha 117'

Dasarath Rangasala Stadium, Kathmandu
