= Katsumi Yusa =

Japanese footballer

Personal information
- Full name: Katsumi Yusa
- Date of birth: 2 August 1988 (age 38)
- Place of birth: Fukushima, Fukushima, Japan
- Height: 1.73 m (5 ft 8 in)
- Positions: Attacking midfielder; winger

Team information
- Current team: Primeiro Fukushima
- Number: 7

Youth career
- 2004–2006: Sanfrecce Hiroshima

Senior career*
Years	Team	Apps	(Gls)
2007–2009	Sanfrecce Hiroshima	1	(0)
2009	→ Zweigen Kanazawa (loan)	8	(0)
2010	Sportivo San Lorenzo	0	(0)
2011–2013	ONGC	51	(7)
2013–2017	Mohun Bagan	121	(24)
2016	→ NorthEast United (loan)	14	(1)
2017–2018	East Bengal	22	(7)
2018–2019	NEROCA	17	(6)
2019–2020	Chennai City	16	(6)
2021–2023	Fukushima United	1	(0)
2023	Primeiro Fukushima	2	(0)
2023	Presidency University	1	(0)
Medal record
Sanfrecce Hiroshima
Runner-up	Emperor's Cup	2007
- * Club domestic league appearances and goals

Katsumi Yusa (遊佐 克美, Yusa Katsumi; born August 2, 1989) is a Japanese professional footballer who plays as a midfielder for Primeiro Fukushima.

== Career ==
=== Sanfrecce Hiroshima ===
Yusa debuted for Sanfrecce Hiroshima in a 2-2 home draw against Gamba Osaka in the 2007 J1 League on 1 December. Yusa also made two appearances in the 2007 J. League Cup. Sanfrecce Hiroshima finished third last of the 2007 J1 League table and were subsequently relegated to J2 League upon a 2-1 aggregate loss against Kyoto Sanga FC during the 2007 J.League promotion/relegation Series. Sanfrecce then claimed the 2008 J2 League having claimed 100 points in 24 matches, and were promoted to the 2009 J1 League. Yusa, however, was loaned out to Zweigen Kanazawa where he participated in the 2009 Japanese Regional Leagues.

=== ONGC ===
In January 2011, Yusa was transferred from Paraguayan División Intermedia side San Lorenzo to Indian I-League side ONGC. He scored his first goal in the 2010–11 I-League season in a 4-0 home win against Hindustan Aero on 9 April 2011. ONGC finished in 13th position of the 2010–11 I-League table and were relegated to the I-League 2nd Division for the 2012 season. Yusa stayed with ONGC during the 2012 I-League 2nd Division, scoring 6 times and helped them gain promotion back to the I-League at the end of the season.

=== Mohun Bagan ===
On 1 May 2013, Yusa agreed to join I-League side Mohun Bagan for the 2013–14 I-League season. In the 2014-15 Season he captained Mohun Bagan to the I-league title and also won the Federation Cup.

=== NorthEast United ===
After three seasons with Mohun Bagan, Yusa signed with NorthEast United of the Indian Super League on loan from Mohun Bagan. On 1 October 2016, Yusa made his debut for NorthEast United against Kerala Blasters and also scored the winning goal in a 1–0 victory for his side.

=== East Bengal F.C ===
After four seasons with Mohun Bagan, Yusa signed for arch rivals East Bengal for the 2017-18 I-League season.

=== NEROCA ===
Yusa joined I-League side NEROCA for the 2018–19 I-League season, and scored few goals.

=== Chennai City F.C ===
Yusa joined I-League side and the champion team of 2018-19 I-League Chennai City FC this year.

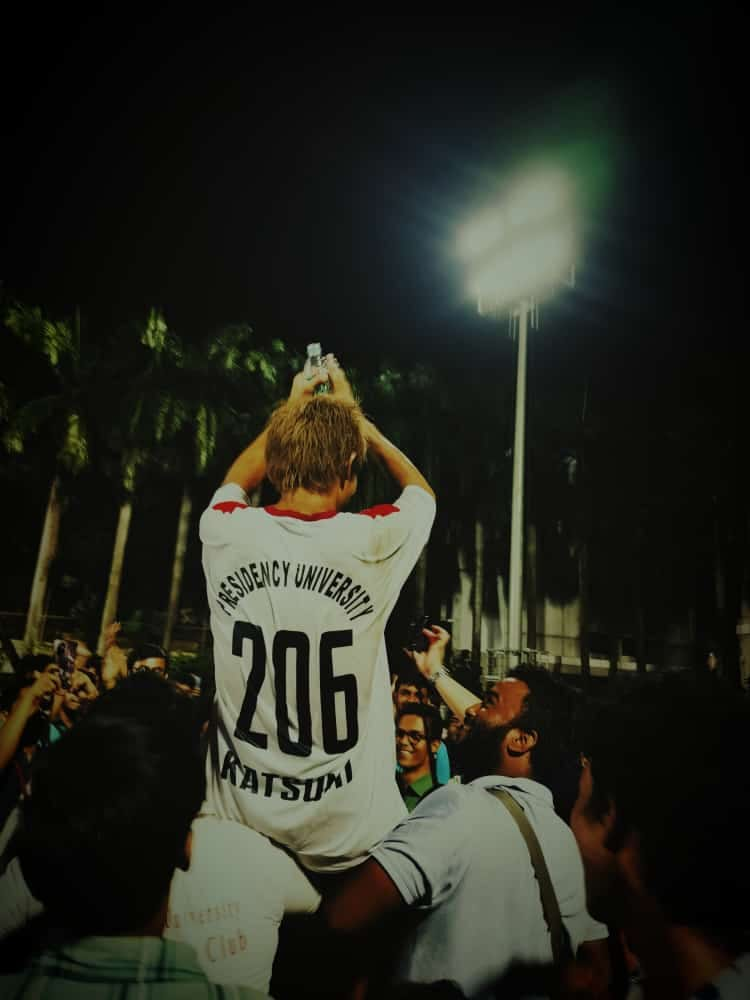
Katsumi wears number 206 to commemorate Presidency University's journey

=== Presidency University, Kolkata ===
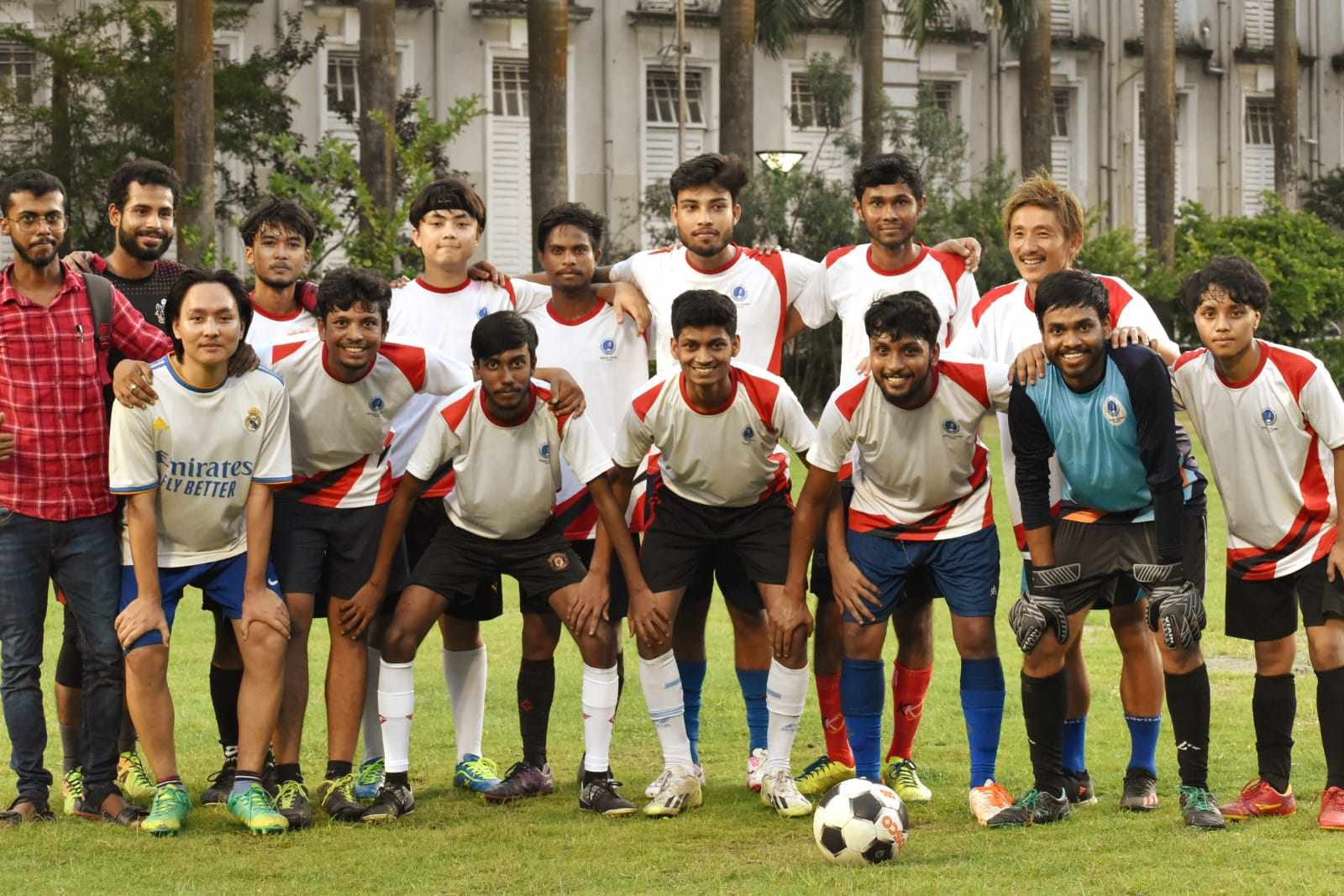
Katsumi as Presidency University player poses for pre match picture with the squad

In 2023, Yusa played for Presidency University on his return to Kolkata. It was marked by a celebratory match organised by Presidency University Mariners' Fan Club where he played for the Presidency team against Team Bengal All Stars. Slogans and celebrations echoed throughout the field in the end.

== Career statistics ==
As of 24 February 2018

Club	Season	League			League Cup		Cup		Continental		Total	
Club	Season	Division	Apps	Goals	Apps	Goals	Apps	Goals	Apps	Goals	Apps	Goals
Mohun Bagan	2013–14	I-League	24	1	0	0	7	1	0	0	31	2
Mohun Bagan	2014–15	I-League	20	7	0	0	8	1	0	0	28	8
Mohun Bagan	2015–16	I-League	16	5	0	0	5	1	8	1	29	7
Mohun Bagan	2016–17	I-League	18	4	0	0	5	1	10	2	33	7
NorthEast United (loan)	2016	Indian Super League	14	1	0	0	0	0	0	0	14	1
East Bengal	2017–18	I-League	18	6	-	-	4	1	-	-	22	7
Total			110	24	0	0	29	5	18	3	157	32

== Honours ==
Mohun Bagan

- I-League: 2014–15
- Federation Cup: 2015–16
