= Abhijit Mahalanobis =

Abhijit Mahalanobis is an electrical engineer at Lockheed Martin Missiles and Fire Control in Orlando, Florida. He was named a Fellow of the Institute of Electrical and Electronics Engineers (IEEE) in 2015 for his contributions to the development of correlation filters for automatic target recognition.
