= Vinay Singh =

Indian footballer

Personal information
- Full name: Vinay Singh
- Date of birth: 16 October 1977 (age 49)
- Place of birth: India
- Position: Goalkeeper

Team information
- Current team: Mohun Bagan A.C.

Senior career*
Years	Team	Apps	(Gls)
2004–2011	Churchill Brothers	210	(??)
2011–2013	Salgaocar	25	(0)
2013	Shillong Lajong	30	(0)
2014–2017	Mohun Bagan		
- * Club domestic league appearances and goals

Vinay Singh is a retired Indian football goalkeeper who last played for then I-League club Mohun Bagan, and is the current goalkeeping coach of RoundGlass Punjab.

== Career ==
=== Shillong Lajong ===
After spending two years with Salgaocar Singh signed for Shillong Lajong and made his debut on 22 September 2013 against Dempo at the Duler Stadium; Singh managed to keep the clean-sheet as Shillong Lajong won the match 0–3.

=== Mohun Bagan ===
Mohun Bagan signed Singh in 2014 as a substitute keeper.

== Career statistics ==
=== Club ===
As of 27 April 2014

Club	Season	League		Federation Cup		Durand Cup		AFC		Total	
Club	Season	Apps	CS	Apps	CS	Apps	CS	Apps	CS	Apps	CS
Churchill Brothers FC	2004–2011	110		5		7				122	
Salgaocar	2012–13	3	3	0	0	0	0	1	0	3	3
Shillong Lajong	2013–14	13	2	2	0	0	0	0	0	15	2
Mohun Bagan	2014–15	0	0	0	0	0	0	0	0	0	0
Career total		126	5	1	0	0	0	0	0	140	5
