= Abhijit Das =

Indian footballer (born 1987)

Personal information
- Date of birth: 10 July 1987 (age 39)
- Place of birth: Kolkata, West Bengal, India
- Height: 1.77 m (5 ft 9 1/2 in)
- Position: Goalkeeper

Team information
- Current team: Salgaocar

Senior career*
| Years | Team | Apps | (Gls) |
| 2010–2013 | Southern Samity | | |
| 2013–2014 | United | 7 | (0) |
| 2014–2015 | Salgaocar | | |
| 2016 | United | | |
| 2017 | Salgaocar | | |
| 2018–2019 | Pathachakra | | |
| 2019– | Bhawanipore | | |
- * Club domestic league appearances and goals as of 19:02, 10 June 2020 (UTC)

Abhijit Das (born 10 July 1987) is an Indian professional footballer who plays as a goalkeeper for Bhawanipore in the Calcutta Football League.

== Career ==
=== United ===
Abhijit signed his first professional contract at the age of 23 for Southern Samity and represented the club for three years. Born in Kolkata, West Bengal, Das made his professional debut for United S.C. on 10 December 2013 against Dempo at the Salt Lake Stadium after both of United's first two choice goalkeepers, Sangram Mukherjee and Ishan Debnath, were revealed to be injured.

=== Salgaocar ===
On 18 June 2014 it was announced that Abhijit has signed for Salgaocar F.C. on a three-year deal.

== Career statistics ==
As of 14 June 2014

| Club | Season | League | | | Federation Cup | | Durand Cup | | AFC | | Total | |
| Club | Season | Division | Apps | Goals | Apps | Goals | Apps | Goals | Apps | Goals | Apps | Goals |
|---|---|---|---|---|---|---|---|---|---|---|---|---|
| United | 2013–14 | I-League | 7 | 0 | 0 | 0 | — | — | — | — | 7 | 0 |
| Career total | | | 7 | 0 | 0 | 0 | 0 | 0 | 0 | 0 | 7 | 0 |

== Personal life ==
Abhijit is a fan of Manchester United, Uruguay national football team and Diego Forlan is his favourite player.
