= Pankaj Moula =

Indian footballer

Personal information
- Date of birth: 20 December 1992 (age 33)
- Place of birth: Garia, West Bengal, India
- Position: Striker

Team information
- Current team: Bhawanipore
- Number: 18

Youth career
- 2008–2009: Kumartuli
- 2009–2010: Mouri Sporting

Senior career*
Years	Team	Apps	(Gls)
2010–2013	Techno Aryan	37	(14)
2013–2016	Mohun Bagan	16	(1)
2018–2019	Mohammedan	6	(0)
2020–	Bhawanipore	5	(3)
- * Club domestic league appearances and goals as of 12 January 2019

Pankaj Moula (Bengali: পঙ্কজ মৌলা; born 21 December 1992 in Garia in West Bengal) is an Indian professional footballer who plays as a striker for Bhawanipore in the I-League 2nd Division.

== Career ==
Pankaj Moula who stays in Garia, started his football career as a scout of the Netaji Nagar, Kolkata coaching camp. He participated in many local tournaments where he caught the attention of football lovers with his ability to score goals.

Pankaj started his professional career in 2008 when he joined Kumortuli and then played for Mouri Sporting in the next season. In 2010, he joined Calcutta Premier Division Club Techno Aryan F.C., where he played successfully for 3 seasons.

Pankaj Moula has always played as a striker throughout his career. He has represented the U-19 West Bengal team, where he scored 4 goals, but unfortunately Bengal got knocked out from the quarter-final stage. He also played for East Bengal in lien in the I-League U19 for 2 seasons, where he scored 8 and 6 goals respectively. Pankaj Moula emerged as the top scorer of the I-League U19 once.

=== Mohun Bagan ===
In 2013–14 season Pankaj joined Mohun Bagan. He made his debut on 14 December 2013 against Dempo S.C. at the Salt Lake Stadium in which he came on as a substitute for Ram Malik in the 46th minute as Mohun Bagan lost the match 0–1.

== Career statistics ==
As of 27 April 2014

Club	Season	League			Federation Cup		Durand Cup		AFC		Total		
Club	Season	Apps	Goals	Apps	Goals	Apps	Goals	Apps	Goals	Apps	Goals		
Mohun Bagan	2013–14	11	1	4	0	0	0	-	-	15	1		
Mohun Bagan	Career total			11	1	4	0	0	0	0	0	15	1
