= Satish Singh =

Indian footballer

Personal information
- Full name: Satish Singh
- Date of birth: 10 November 1993 (age 33)
- Place of birth: Uttarpara, West Bengal, India
- Height: 1.78 m (5 ft 10 in)
- Positions: Centre back; right back

Team information
- Current team: Air India FC
- Number: 22

Senior career*
| Years | Team | Apps | (Gls) |
| 2010–2012 | Bhawanipore | 9 | (0) |
| 2012–2014 | Churchill Brothers | 19 | (0) |
| 2014– | Mohun Bagan (Loan) | 14 | (0) |
| 2015– | United SC | 6 | (0) |
| 2016– | Bhawanipore | 7 | (0) |
| 2017– | Churchill Brothers | 4 | (0) |
| 2017–2019 | Peerless | 12 | (0) |
| 2019–2020 | Air India FC | 8 | (0) |
| 2022– | Tarun Sanga FC | 15 | (0) |
| 2022–2023 | Garhwal Dimond FC | 14 | (0) |
| 2024–2025 | Calcutta Police FC | 0 | (0) |
| 2024–2025 | Real Chikkamagaluru FC | 14 | (1) |

International career
| 2015– | India U23 | 0 | (0) |
- * Club domestic league appearances and goals as of 5 June 2014

Satish Singh (born 10 November 1993 in Uttarpara) is an India footballer who played as a right back for Mohun Bagan in the I-League and last played for Peerless SC in the Calcutta Football League.

== Career ==
=== Early career ===
Born in Uttarpara, Satish is a product of the Uttarpara Football Coaching Center where he used to train under Bastab Roy. Satish joined Bhawanipore F.C. in 2010 where he played two seasons. He was part of the squad that helped Bhawanipore to reach the Premier Division of the Calcutta Football League.

=== Churchill Brothers ===
Singh made his debut for Churchill Brothers S.C. on 19 January 2013 during an I-League match against East Bengal F.C. at the Salt Lake Stadium in Kolkata, West Bengal in which he came on as an 89th-minute substitute for Steven Dias; Churchill Brothers won the match 3–0.

=== Mohun Bagan ===
On 5 June 2014, it was announced that Satish signed for Mohun Bagan.

== Career statistics ==
=== Club ===
As of 5 June 2014

| Club | Season | League | | | Federation Cup | | Durand Cup | | AFC | | Total | |
| Club | Season | Division | Apps | Goals | Apps | Goals | Apps | Goals | Apps | Goals | | |
|---|---|---|---|---|---|---|---|---|---|---|---|---|
| Churchill Brothers | 2012–13 | I-League | 5 | 0 | 0 | 0 | 0 | 0 | — | — | 5 | 0 |
| Churchill Brothers | 2013–14 | I-League | 14 | 0 | 1 | 0 | 0 | 0 | 6 | 0 | 21 | |
| Churchill Brothers | 2016–17 | I-League | 4 | 0 | 0 | 0 | 0 | — | — | 0 | 4 | |
| Career total | | | 23 | 0 | 1 | 0 | 0 | 0 | 6 | 0 | 30 | |

== Personal life ==
Jose Ramirez Barreto being his idol, Satish is an enthusiast of Cristiano Ronaldo and supports the Portugal national football team.

== Honours ==
=== Club ===
Churchill Brothers

- I-League: 2012–13
- Federation Cup: 2013–14

Peerless

- Calcutta Premier Division A runner-up: 2018–19
