= Naoba Singh Thokchom =

Indian footballer

Naoba Singh
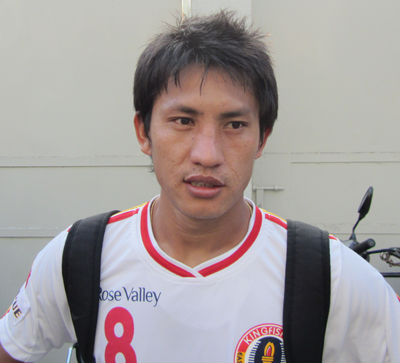

Personal information
- Full name: Naoba Singh Thokchom
- Date of birth: 1 March 1988 (age 38)
- Place of birth: Manipur, India
- Height: 1.73 m (5 ft 8 in)
- Position: Defender

Team information
- Current team: Yarkhok United

Youth career
- Tata FA

Senior career*
Years	Team	Apps	(Gls)
2006–2010	Churchill Brothers		
2010–2014	East Bengal	36	(0)
2014	Delhi Dynamos	5	(0)
2015	Royal Wahingdoh	11	(1)
2015	Delhi Dynamos	1	(0)
2015–2016	Mumbai	0	(0)
2017–2018	NEROCA	11	(0)
2019–	Yarkhok United		

International career
2009–2010	India U23	8	(0)
- * Club domestic league appearances and goals as of 19:06, 1 September 2015 (UTC)

Naoba Singh Thokchom (Meitei: Thokchom Naoba Singh, born 1 March 1988) is an Indian professional footballer who last played as a defender for NEROCA in the I-League.

== Career ==
=== East Bengal ===
After spending his youth career with the famed Tata Football Academy, Naoba signed for Churchill Brothers of the I-League. While with Churchill Brothers Singh scored one goal which came against Mahindra United in the I-League on 3 March 2010. Later in 2010 Singh signed for East Bengal who also play in the I-League. Naoba represented Delhi Dynamos FC during the 2014 Indian Super League before signing for I-League newcomers, Royal Wahingdoh for the 2014-15 season. In July 2015 Singh was drafted to play for Delhi Dynamos in the 2015 Indian Super League.

== International ==
Singh made eight appearances for the India U23 team, and played in the 2009 SAFF Cup.

== Honours ==
India U23

- SAFF Championship: 2009
