= Dipak Rai =

Nepali footballer

Personal information
- Place of birth: Pathari, Nepal
- Position: Forward

Team information
- Current team: Manang Marshyangdi Club

Senior career*
Years	Team	Apps	(Gls)
2011–12	Himalayan Sherpa Club		
2012–13	Machhindra Football Club		
2013–	Manang Marshyangdi Club		

International career
2013–	Nepal	3	(0)
- * Club domestic league appearances and goals

Dipak Rai (Nepali: दीपक राई) (sometimes spelled Deepak) is a Nepali professional footballer who plays for Manang Marshyangdi Club as a forward.

== Club career ==
=== Machhindra ===
In the 2012 Pokhara cup in a match against Calcutta Post Trust Rai scored a hat-trick and also assisted one of Bishal Rai's two goals in a 6-0 victory.

=== Manang Marshyangdi ===
In March 2013 Rai joined the Manang Marshyangdi Club for an undisclosed fee. After scoring a goal on his debut Rai commented that it had been his "Manang Marshyangdi is my dream team". He in the thirty-second minute in a 12-0 win over Tushal Youth Club.

In the Semifinals of the 2013 Pokhara Cup Rai scored the first goal in a 2-1 win over Nepal Army Club. Manang Marshyangdi went on to win the tournament and Rai was nominated to be player of the tournament. As a result, Rai was gifted a motorcycle and 15,000 rupees.

In the group stage of the 2014 AFC President's Cup in a match against Svay Rieng Rai scored twice in a 6-3 victory.

On 16 November 2014 Rai came on as a sub and scored a consolation goal in a 2-1 loss to Indian side Pune F.C. in a match at the 2014 Bhutanese King's Cup. In the next match Rai scored the second goal in a 3-0 win over Assam Electricity FC.

== International career ==
Rai was called up to play for Nepal in 2011, however coach Graham Roberts exuded Rai and teammate Bijaya Gurung for not turning up to training.

Rai made his debut on 19 November in a match against India in Siliguri, coming on as a sub for Anil Gurung in the 50th minute. In March 2014 Rai was called up for a match against Yemen. He replaced Raju Tamang in a 2-0 loss.

In April 2014 Rai was called to the national team for a friendly against the Philippines He started that match in what proved to be a 3-0 loss.

== Personal life ==
Rai hails from Pathari, Nepal. In May 2014 Rai honored fellow Pathari footballer Jeewan Rai in an event where Dipak handed over U.K. sponsored gear to Jeewan.

== Honors ==
Manang Marshyangdi Club

- Martyr's Memorial A-Division League: 2013–14
