= Kingshuk Debnath =

Indian footballer (born 1985)

Kinshuk Debnath
Personal information
- Full name: Kinshuk Debnath
- Date of birth: 8 May 1985 (age 41)
- Place of birth: Nabadwip, West Bengal, India
- Height: 1.77 m (5 ft 9 1/2 in)
- Position: Defender

Team information
- Current team: Bhawanipore FC
- Number: 4

Youth career
- Rishra Sporting
- East Bengal

Senior career*
Years	Team	Apps	(Gls)
2005–2006	Techno Aryan	12	(2)
2006–2007	Wari	34	(2)
2008–2010	Chirag United	14	(0)
2010–2012	Mohun Bagan	267	(5)
2012–2013	Mohammedan	2	(0)
2013–2018	Mohun Bagan	65	(0)
2014	→ Atlético de Kolkata (loan)	11	(0)
2015	→ Mumbai City (loan)	3	(0)
2016	→ Atlético de Kolkata (loan)	3	(0)
2018–2019	East Bengal	8	(0)
2019–2021	Bhawanipore FC	8	(0)
2021–2023	Bengaluru United	11	(1)
2023–	Bhawanipore FC	2	(1)
- * Club domestic league appearances and goals

Kinshuk Debnath (Bengali: কিংশুক দেবনাথ; born 8 May 1985) is an Indian professional footballer who plays as a defender for Bhawanipore FC.

== Honours ==
=== Club ===
Mohun Bagan

- I-League: 2014–15
- Federation Cup: 2015–16

Atlético de Kolkata

- Indian Super League: 2014, 2016
