= Clifton Dias =

Indian footballer

Personal information
- Date of birth: 10 January 1991 (age 35)
- Place of birth: Goa, India
- Height: 1.70 m (5 ft 7 in)
- Position: Midfielder

Team information
- Current team: Salgaocar
- Number: 29

Youth career
- 2010–2011: Salgaocar

Senior career*
Years	Team	Apps	(Gls)
2011–present	Salgaocar	34	(1)

International career
2014	India U23		
- * Club domestic league appearances and goals as of 30 May 2015

Clifton Dias (born 10 January 1991 in Goa, India) is an Indian footballer who currently plays for Salgaocar in the I-League.

== Career ==
=== Salgaocar ===
Dias joined the Salgaocar youth team in 2010 and after one season in the youth under-19s he was promoted to the first team and came off the bench for Salgaocars 4–0 victory over East Bengal on 29 December 2011.

== Career statistics ==
=== Club ===
As of 30 May 2015

Club	Season	League			Cup			AFC			Total		
Club	Season	Apps	Goals	Assists	Apps	Goals	Assists	Apps	Goals	Assists	Apps	Goals	Assists
Salgaocar	2011–12	2	0	0	0	0	0	0	0	0	2	0	0
2012–13	0	0	0	0	0	0	-	-	-	0	0	0	
2013–14	22	1	0	2	0	0	-	-	-	24	1	0	
2014–15	10	0	0	1	1	0	–	–	–	11	1	0	
Career total		34	1	0	3	1	0	0	0	0	37	2	0
