= Tirthankar Sarkar =

Indian footballer (born 1993)

Personal information
- Full name: Tirthankar Sarkar
- Date of birth: 1 July 1993 (age 33)
- Place of birth: Belgharia, West Bengal, India
- Height: 1.69 m (5 ft 7 in)
- Position: Left wing

Team information
- Current team: Diamond Harbour FC
- Number: 25

Youth career
- Mohun Bagan Academy
- 2009–2010: Salgaocar

Senior career*
Years	Team	Apps	(Gls)
2010–2013	Pailan Arrows	36	(7)
2013–2014	Mohun Bagan	15	(2)
2014–2016	Southern Samity	14	(0)
2017	Mohammedan	19	(1)
2017	Mohun Bagan	9	(2)
2018–2021	Mohammedan	10	(0)
2021–2022	BSS Sporting Club	5	(0)
2022–	Diamond Harbour FC		

International career
2008	India U16	6	(0)
2011	India U19	4	(1)
2012	India U23	2	(0)
- * Club domestic league appearances and goals as of 20 July 2018

Tirthankar Sarkar (born 1 July 1993) is an Indian professional footballer who plays as a midfielder for Diamond Harbour FC in the Calcutta Football League.

== Career ==
=== Early career ===
Tirthankar is a product of the Mohun Bagan SAIL Football Academy in Durgapur. Tirthankar was part of the academy team that participated in the Manchester United Premier Cup and played in the final round held at Manchester. He also went to 3 overseas tours for Mohun Bagan SAIL Football Academy, to Singapore, Thailand, and England. After passing out from the academy, Tirthankar played for Salgaocar from 2009 to 2010.

=== Pailan Arrows ===
After starting his career in the Mohun Bagan and Salgaocar youth teams, Sarkar signed with I-League club Pailan Arrows. He made his I-League debut on 13 January 2012 against Sporting Clube de Goa, which Pailan lost the match 2–3. Sarkar scored his second goal for Pailan Arrows on 28 January 2013 against United Sikkim F.C. to equalize in the 86th minute for his side as the game ended 1–1.

=== Mohun Bagan ===
On 12 June 2014, it was confirmed that Tirthankar had signed for Mohun Bagan.

== Career statistics ==
=== Club ===
As of 12 June 2014

Club	Season	League		Federation Cup		Durand Cup		AFC		Total	
Club	Season	Apps	Goals	Apps	Goals	Apps	Goals	Apps	Goals	Apps	Goals
Pailan Arrows	2011–12	8	0	0	0	0	0	—	—	8	0
Pailan Arrows	2012–13	21	2	1	0	2	0	—	—	24	2
Career total		29	2	1	0	2	0	0	0	32	2

== Personal life ==
Tirthankar's favourite players are Renedy Singh, Steven Gerrard and Luis Suárez. He supports England national football team and Germany national football team, as well as Liverpool F.C among European clubs.

== Honours ==
=== Club ===
Mohun Bagan

- Calcutta Football League (1): 2018–19
