= Francis Kasonde =

Zambian footballer (born 1986)

Personal information
- Date of birth: 1 September 1986 (age 40)
- Place of birth: Kitwe, Zambia
- Height: 1.82 m (6 ft 0 in)
- Position: Centre-back

Team information
- Current team: Mufulira Wanderers F.C.

Senior career*
Years	Team	Apps	(Gls)
2004	Zesco United		
2005–2009	Power Dynamos		
2009–2010	Al-Suwaiq		
2010	Power Dynamos		
2010–2011	Al-Hazem	25	(1)
2011	Power Dynamos		
2012–2014	TP Mazembe		
2014	Hapoel Ra'anana	7	(0)
2014–2015	Salgaocar FC	17	(0)
2016–2017	Power Dynamos	8	(0)
2017–2019	Sabah		
2019–2020	Al-Seeb Club		
2020–	Mufulira Wanderers F.C.		

International career^{‡}
2005–2013	Zambia	35	(2)
- * Club domestic league appearances and goals as of 2019-02-23 ‡ National team caps and goals as of 2017-03-20

Francis Kasonde (born 1 September 1986) is a Zambian professional footballer who plays for Mufulira Wanderers. Kasonde mainly plays as a centre-back but also can play as a defensive midfielder or as a right-back.

== Club career ==
Kasonde has played for Power Dynamos F.C. in Kitwe, Zambia and Omani side Al-Suwaiq Club.

In June 2017, Kasonde signed a six-month contract with Malaysia Premier League side Sabah. On 30 June 2017, Kasonde made his debut in a 1–0 victory during league match over PDRM.

== International career ==
Kasonde is also a regular member of the Zambia national team from 2005 until 2013. He was the key of the Zambian team that won the 2012 African Cup of Nations. He made his international debut in 2005 and scored his first goal against Egypt in a 1–1 draw.

== Honours ==
Zambia

- Africa Cup of Nations: 2012
