= Luciano Sabrosa =

Brazilian footballer (born 1979)

Personal information
- Full name: Luciano Sabrosa
- Date of birth: 25 July 1979 (age 47)
- Place of birth: Santo Ângelo, Brazil
- Height: 1.86 m (6 ft 1 in)
- Position: Center back

Senior career*
Years	Team	Apps	(Gls)
1999–2002	Santo Ângelo		
2003	São Gabriel		
2004	Glória		
2004	Juventus-RS		
2005	Metropolitano		
2006	Passo Fundo		
2006	Videira		
2007	Juventus Jaraguá		
2007–2008	Vasco		
2008–2009	Sporting Goa		
2009–2013	Salgaocar	17	(6)
2013–2014	Mohammedan Sporting	18	(2)
2014–2015	Pune	20	(2)
2015–2016	FC Goa	13	(0)
2016	→ Mohun Bagan (on loan)	14	(2)
- * Club domestic league appearances and goals as of 16:49, 23 April 2016 (UTC)

Luciano Sabrosa (born 25 July 1979) is a Brazilian retired footballer who last played for FC Goa as a defender in Indian Super League.
