= Ryuji Sueoka =

Japanese footballer

Ryuji Sueoka 末岡 龍二
Personal information
- Full name: Ryuji Sueoka
- Date of birth: May 22, 1979 (age 47)
- Place of birth: Hikari, Yamaguchi, Japan
- Height: 1.69 m (5 ft 6 1/2 in)
- Position: Midfielder

Youth career
- 1995–1997: Hikari High School

College career
Years	Team	Apps	(Gls)
1998–2001	Chukyo University		

Senior career*
Years	Team	Apps	(Gls)
2002–2005	Albirex Niigata	22	(1)
2004	→Albirex Niigata Singapore (loan)	27	(12)
2006	Geylang United	29	(4)
2007	Balestier Khalsa	32	(9)
2008–2009	Bangkok United	22	(0)
2009–2010	Mohun Bagan	7	(5)
2010–2012	Salgaocar	28	(27)
2012–2013	Dempo	17	(11)
2013–2014	East Bengal	18	(4)
2014–2015	Pune	17	(3)
Total		219	(76)
- * Club domestic league appearances and goals

Ryuji Sueoka (末岡 龍二, Sueoka Ryuji; born May 22, 1979) is a former Japanese football player. He has played in Japan, Singapore, Thailand and India at the top level.

== Playing career ==
Sueoka started his professional career in the J2 League with Albirex Niigata club. He then moved to Albirex Niigata Singapore on loan, where he stayed for the 2004 season, scoring 12 times in 24 appearances. He returned to his parent club for a season but appeared only sparingly before returning to Singapore, this time with Geylang United. He then played for Balestier Khalsa for the 2007 season before moving to Thailand with Bangkok United.

In 2011, coaches in the I-League named Sueoka best player.

== Club statistics ==
Club	Season	League			Cup		Other		Continental		Total	
Club	Season	Division	Apps	Goals	Apps	Goals	Apps	Goals	Apps	Goals	Apps	Goals
Albirex Niigata	2002	J2 League	5	0	2	0	–		–		7	0
Albirex Niigata	2003	J2 League	12	1	3	1	–		–		15	2
Albirex Niigata Singapore	2004	S. League	27	12	1	0	0	0	–		28	12
Albirex Niigata	2005	J1 League	5	0	3	1	–		–		8	1
Geylang United	2006	S. League	29	4	0	0	0	0	–		29	4
Balestier Khalsa	2007	S. League	32	9	0	0	0	0	–		32	9
Bangkok United	2008	Thai League	22	0	0	0	0	0	–		22	0
Mohun Bagan	2009–2010	I-League	7	5	0	0	0	0	–		7	5
Salgaocar	2010–2011	I-League	10	9	0	0	0	0	–		10	9
Salgaocar	2011–2012	I-League	18	18	0	0	0	0	4	1	22	19
Dempo	2012–2013	I-League	17	11	0	0	0	0	–		17	11
East Bengal	2013–2014	I-League	18	4	0	0	0	0	2	1	20	5
Pune	2014–2015	I-League	17	3	0	0	0	0	–		17	3
Career			219	76	9	2	0	0	6	1	234	79
