= Pierre Boya =

Cameroonian footballer

Personal information
- Full name: Pierre Boya
- Date of birth: 16 January 1984 (age 42)
- Place of birth: Yaoundé, Cameroon
- Height: 1.83 m (6 ft 0 in)
- Position: Striker

Youth career
- Union Douala

Senior career*
Years	Team	Apps	(Gls)
2002–2003	Salam Zgharta	27	(15)
2003–2007	Partizan	64	(13)
2007–2009	Rapid București	32	(8)
2009–2010	Grenoble	32	(1)
2010–2011	Partizan	7	(3)
2011–2012	Austria Lustenau	14	(11)
2012–2013	Randers	15	(2)
2013	Penang FA		
2014	Kukësi	10	(4)
2014–2016	Mohun Bagan	15	(2)
2016–2017	Persija Jakarta		
2017	AS Pagny	10	(2)
2017–2018	AS St Amand		

International career
2005–2007	Cameroon	4	(1)
- * Club domestic league appearances and goals as of 30 July 2018

Pierre Boya (born 16 January 1984) is a former Cameroonian professional footballer who played as a striker.

== Club career ==
On 10 November 2003, Boya signed a four-year contract with Partizan. He scored a goal on his debut for the club two weeks later in a 3–1 home league victory over Radnički Obrenovac. The highlight of his career at Partizan was during the 2004–05 UEFA Cup group stage, when Boya scored both goals for his team in their 2–2 away draw with Lazio. He was eventually unable to find the back of the net for a year and a half. In the meantime, Boya failed to convert a penalty in the shootout versus Artmedia Bratislava in the return leg of the 2005–06 UEFA Champions League third qualifying round that would have qualified Partizan for the group stage. He finally ended his goal drought on 8 April 2006, netting a brace in a 3–1 away league win against Voždovac.

In the summer of 2007, Boya moved to Rapid București on a free transfer. He scored seven goals in 21 league appearances in his first season at the club. After the departure of Mugurel Buga, Ionuț Mazilu and Lucian Burdujan in the summer of 2008, Boya was considered as the club's main attacking option. He was eventually transferred to Grenoble in the 2009 winter transfer window.

On 31 August 2010, Boya returned to Partizan and signed a one-and-a-half-year deal, after the club qualified for the 2010–11 UEFA Champions League group stage. He marked his second debut for the club by scoring two goals and providing an assist after coming on as a substitute in a 3–0 home league win over Rad on 11 September 2010. Eventually, Boya left Partizan during the 2011 winter transfer window, after a disagreement with the club's board.

In late 2011, Boya moved to Austria and joined First League side Austria Lustenau, but was unable to play until the expiration of his contract with Partizan. He debuted for the club in the second half of the 2011–12 season, scoring 10 goals in his first eight league matches. In August 2012, Boya was transferred to Danish club Randers for the rest of the 2012–13 season. He signed with Albanian club Kukësi during the 2013–14 season.

On 6 August 2014, Boya joined I-League side Mohun Bagan. He officially signed as their marquee player three days later and was registered with the number 43 shirt. Boya made 15 appearances and scored two goals for the club during the campaign, as they won the title.

In spring 2016, Boya spent some time on trial at Persija Jakarta, but failed to get a contract.

== International career ==
Between 2005 and 2007, Boya made four appearances for the Cameroon national team and scored his first international goal in a friendly match against Togo in a 2–2 draw on 7 February 2007. He also represented his country at the 2006 Africa Cup of Nations where he played in the group stage match against Angola and DR Congo.

== Career statistics ==
National team	Year	Apps	Goals
Cameroon	2005	1	0
Cameroon	2006	2	0
Cameroon	2007	1	1
Total		4	1

== Honours ==
Partizan

- First League of Serbia and Montenegro: 2004–05

Mohun Bagan

- I-League: 2014–15

Individual

- Jigme Dorji Wangchuk Memorial Gold Cup Top scorer: 2014
