= 2013–14 Mohun Bagan FC season =

Indian football club season

Mohun Bagan
2013–14 season
- Chairman: Siddharth Mallya
- Head coach: Karim Bencherifa
- Stadium: Salt Lake Stadium; Barasat Stadium; Kalyani Stadium
- I-League: 8th
- Calcutta Football League: Runners-up
- Federation Cup: Semi-finalist
- IFA Shield: Group stage
- Top goalscorer: League: Odafa (6); All: Odafa (13)
Home colours	Away colours

The 2013–14 Mohun Bagan FC season was the club's 7th season in I-League and 124th season since its establishment in 1889. The team finished runners-up in the Calcutta Football League and a dismal eighth in the I-League. Mohun Bagan reached the semi-finals of the Federation Cup where they were defeated by Churchill Brothers and they bowed out in the group stage of the IFA Shield.

== Transfers ==
=== In ===
==== Pre-season ====
Pos.	Name	Signed from	Ref.
GK	(India) Sandip Nandy	(India) Churchill Brothers	
GK	(India) Monotosh Ghosh	(India) Salgaocar	
DF	(India) Ravinder Singh	(India) United	
DF	(India) Kingshuk Debnath	(India) Mohammedan	
DF	(India) Rowilson Rodrigues	(India) Dempo	
DF	(India) Wahid Sali	(India) ONGC	
DF	(India) Pritam Kotal	(India) Pailan Arrows	
DF	(India) Shouvik Ghosh	(India) Pailan Arrows	
DF	(India) Nicolau Borges	(India) Dempo	
DF	(India) Bengkok Nameirakpam	(India) Mohammedan	
DF	(India) Rana Gharami	(India) Kalighat M.S.	
MF	(India) Adil Khan	(India) Sporting Goa	
MF	(Japan) Katsumi Yusa	(India) ONGC	
MF	(India) Ram Malik	(India) Techno Aryan	
MF	(India) Pankaj Moula	(India) Techno Aryan	
MF	(India) Zakeer Mundampara	(India) United	
MF	(India) T.Seiboi Haokip	(India) Mohun Bagan SAIL Academy	
MF	(India) Adarsh Tamang	(India) Mohun Bagan SAIL Academy	
MF	(India) Anthony Pereira	(India) Dempo	
MF	(India) Rajib Ghorui	(India) Techno Aryan	
MF	(India) Arghya Chakraborty	(India) Rangdajied United	
MF	(India) Shaiju Mon	(India) Pailan Arrows	
FW	(Kenya) Harrison Muranda	(Kenya) Nairobi City Stars	
FW	(India) Shankar Oraon	(India) United	
FW	(India) Prakash Roy	(India) Mohun Bagan Jalpaiguri Academy	

==== Mid-season ====
Pos.	Name	Signed from	Ref.
MF	(India) Ujjal Howladar	(India) Techno Aryan	
MF	(India) Bikramjit Singh	(India) Churchill Brothers	
MF	(India) Prayashu Halder	(India) Southern Samity	
MF	(India) Abung Meetei	(India) Pune	
FW	(Nigeria) Christopher Chizoba	(India) Kalighat M.S.	

=== Out ===
==== Pre-season ====
Pos.	Name	Sold to	Ref.
GK	(India) Arindam Bhattacharya	(India) Churchill Brothers	
GK	(India) Sudipta Banerjee	Released	
GK	(India) Naveen Kumar	(India) Lonestar Kashmir	
GK	(India) Milton Bhowmick	Released	
DF	(India) Nirmal Chettri	(India) Mohammedan	
DF	(India) Khelemba Singh	(India) Mumbai	
DF	(India) Biswajit Saha	(India) Eagles F.C.	
DF	(India) Mehrajuddin Wadoo	(India) Mohammedan	
DF	(India) Lalrozama Fanai	(India) Bengaluru FC	
DF	(India) Rajib Ghosh	(India) Bhawanipore	
DF	(India) Warundeep Singh	(India) Mohammedan	
DF	(India) Deepak Sumanth	Released	
DF	(India) Sourav Chakraborty	Released	
DF	(India) Mohan Sarkar	Released	
MF	(India) Syed Rahim Nabi	(India) Mohammedan	
MF	(India) Snehasish Chakraborty	(India) United	
MF	(India) Sushanth Mathew	(India) Rangdajied United	
MF	(India) Jewel Raja	(India) Dempo	
MF	(India) Rakesh Masih	(India) Salgaocar	
MF	(India) Manish Maithani	(India) Mohammedan	
MF	(India) Lalrin Fela	Released	
MF	(Namibia) Quinton Jacobs	Released	
MF	(India) Bijendra Rai	Released	
MF	(India) Arjun Chatterjee	Released	
MF	(India) Nirapada Mondal	Released	
FW	(Australia) Tolgay Özbey	(India) Mohammedan	
FW	(India) Dipendu Biswas	Released	
FW	(India) Anil Kumar	Released	

==== Mid-season ====
Pos.	Name	Signed from	Ref.
DF	(India) Nicolau Borges	Released	
DF	(India) Bengkok Nameirakpam	Released	
MF	(India) Anthony Pereira	Released	
FW	(Kenya) Harrison Muranda	Released	

== Kits ==
Supplier: Shiv Naresh / Sponsors: McDowell's No.1

Home	Away	Goalkeeper

== Squad ==
=== First-team Squad ===
Name	Nationality	Position	Date of Birth (Age)
Goalkeepers
Shilton Pal (vice-captain)	(India)	GK	20 December 1987 (age 38)
Sandip Nandy	(India)	GK	15 January 1975 (age 51)
Monotosh Ghosh	(India)	GK	19 September 1989 (age 37)
Defenders
Aiborlang Khongjee	(India)	DF	9 December 1987 (age 38)
Ravinder Singh	(India)	DF	17 December 1991 (age 34)
Echezona Anyichie	(Nigeria)	DF	14 May 1990 (age 36)
Kingshuk Debnath	(India)	DF	8 May 1985 (age 41)
Rowilson Rodrigues	(India)	DF	28 March 1987 (age 39)
Wahid Sali	(India)	DF	11 December 1985 (age 40)
Pritam Kotal	(India)	DF	9 August 1993 (age 33)
Shouvik Ghosh	(India)	DF	5 November 1992 (age 34)
Rana Gharami	(India)	DF	—
Midfielders
Denson Devadas	(India)	MF	20 December 1982 (age 43)
Adil Khan	(India)	MF	7 July 1988 (age 38)
Katsumi Yusa	(Japan)	MF	2 August 1988 (age 38)
Ram Malik	(India)	MF	10 March 1991 (age 35)
Pankaj Moula	(India)	MF	20 December 1992 (age 33)
Manish Bhargav	(India)	MF	24 February 1994 (age 32)
Ujjal Howladar	(India)	MF	1 January 1986 (age 40)
Zakeer Mundampara	(India)	MF	20 May 1990 (age 36)
Bikramjit Singh	(India)	MF	15 October 1992 (age 34)
T.Seiboi Haokip	(India)	MF	—
Adarsh Tamang	(India)	MF	5 July 1995 (age 31)
Rajib Ghorui	(India)	MF	8 October 1995 (age 31)
Arghya Chakraborty	(India)	MF	—
Shaiju Mon	(India)	MF	16 May 1991 (age 35)
Prayashu Halder	(India)	MF	—
Abung Meetei	(India)	MF	—
Forwards
Odafa Onyeka Okolie (captain)	(Nigeria)	FW	6 June 1985 (age 41)
Christopher Chizoba	(Nigeria)	FW	17 June 1991 (age 35)
Chinadorai Sabeeth	(India)	FW	2 December 1990 (age 35)
Shankar Oraon	(India)	FW	8 August 1989 (age 37)
Prakash Roy	(India)	FW	—

Last updated: 27 February 2014
Source: mohunbaganac.com

== Technical Staff ==
Position	Name
Chief coach	(Morocco) Karim Bencherifa
Assistant coach	(India) Mridul Banerjee
Goalkeeping coach	(India) Arpan Dey
Physiotherapist	(England) Jonathan Corner
Strength And Conditioning Coach	(Serbia) Ivan Stevanovic
Team manager	(India) Debasish Dutta

Source: mohunbaganac.com

== Statistics ==
=== Calcutta Football League stats ===
Win Draw Loss

Opposition	Score
Army XI	3–0
Bhawanipore	2–0
East Bengal	1–0
George Telegraph	1–1
Kalighat MS	5–0
Mohammedan	1–1
Peerless	2–2
Prayag United	0–0
Police AC	4–0
Railway FC	4–1
Techno Aryan	3–0

Last Updated: 11 January 2014
Source: Statistics

==== Goal scorers ====
Pos.	Nat.	Name	Goal(s)	Appearance(s)
MF	(Japan)	Katsumi Yusa	5	11
FW	(Kenya)	Harrison Muranda	4	5
FW	(Nigeria)	Odafa Onyeka Okolie	3	5
MF	(India)	Manish Bhargav	3	5
FW	(India)	Chinadorai Sabeeth	3	7
MF	(India)	Ram Malik	3	7
DF	(India)	Ravinder Singh	1	2
MF	(India)	Adil Khan	1	4
MF	(India)	Zakeer Mundampara	1	5
FW	(India)	Shankar Oraon	1	8
MF	(India)	Denson Devadas	1	10
TOTAL			26	11

Last updated: 11 January 2014
Source: Matches

==== Disciplinary record ====
Pos.	Nat.	Player	Yellow card	(yellow card) (yellow-red card)	Red card	Notes
DF	(Nigeria)	Echezona Anyichie	2	1	0	Missed Match: vs Kalighat M.S. (28 December 2013); Missed Match: vs Mohammedan (6 January 2014)
DF	(India)	Aiborlang Khongjee	3	0	0	Missed Match: vs Police A.C. (6 October 2013)
DF	(India)	Kingshuk Debnath	3	0	0	Missed Match: vs Kalighat M.S. (28 December 2013)
DF	(India)	Adil Khan	2	0	0	Missed Match: vs United (17 November 2013)
DF	(India)	Zakeer Mundampara	2	0	0	Missed Match: vs Bhawanipore (10 November 2013)
FW	(India)	Shankar Oraon	1	0	0	
MF	(Japan)	Katsumi Yusa	1	0	0	
MF	(India)	Adarsh Tamang	1	0	0	
DF	(India)	Rowilson Rodrigues	1	0	0	
DF	(India)	Wahid Sali	1	0	0	
DF	(India)	Nicolau Borges	1	0	0	
GK	(India)	Sandip Nandy	1	0	0	

Last updated: 11 January 2014
Source: Matches

=== I-League stats ===
Win Draw Loss

Opposition	Home Score	Away Score
Bengaluru FC	0–2	1–1
Churchill Brothers	2–2	0–0
Dempo	0–1	0–0
East Bengal	0–1	1–1
Mumbai	1–1	1–0
Mohammedan S.C.	0–0	0–0
Prayag United	4–0	0–0
Pune	3–1	0–2
Rangdajied United	0–2	1–3
Salgaocar	2–1	0–1
Shillong	2–1	1–1
Sporting Goa	1–2	3–1

Last Updated: 27 April 2014
Source: Statistics

==== Goal scorers ====
Pos.	Nat.	Name	Goal(s)	Appearance(s)
FW	(Nigeria)	Odafa Onyeka Okolie	6	12
FW	(Nigeria)	Christopher Chizoba	5	13
FW	(India)	Chinadorai Sabeeth	4	21
MF	(India)	Ram Malik	2	16
FW	(Kenya)	Harrison Muranda	1	9
MF	(India)	Pankaj Moula	1	11
MF	(India)	Zakeer Mundampara	1	14
MF	(India)	Manish Bhargav	1	15
MF	(Japan)	Katsumi Yusa	1	24
Own Goal			1	
TOTAL			23	24

Last updated: 27 April 2014
Source: Matches

==== Disciplinary record ====
Pos.	Nat.	Player	Yellow card	(yellow card) (yellow-red card)	Red card	Notes
DF	(Nigeria)	Echezona Anyichie	5	2	0	Missed Match: vs Sporting Goa (19 October 2013); Missed Match: vs East Bengal (24 November 2013); Missed Match: vs United (6 December 2013)
MF	(India)	Denson Devadas	6	1	0	Missed Match: vs Mumbai (26 October 2013); Missed Match: vs East Bengal (1 March 2014)
FW	(India)	Shankar Oraon	1	1	0	Missed Match: vs Dempo (1 November 2013)
FW	(Nigeria)	Christopher Chizoba	4	0	0	
MF	(India)	Zakeer Mundampara	4	0	0	Missed Match: vs Bengaluru FC (6 April 2014)
MF	(Japan)	Katsumi Yusa	3	0	0	
MF	(India)	Ram Malik	3	0	0	
DF	(India)	Kingshuk Debnath	3	0	0	
DF	(India)	Aiborlang Khongjee	3	0	0	
DF	(India)	Rowilson Rodrigues	2	0	0	
DF	(India)	Wahid Sali	2	0	0	
FW	(India)	Chinadorai Sabeeth	1	0	0	
MF	(India)	Manish Bhargav	1	0	0	
MF	(India)	Bikramjit Singh	1	0	0	
DF	(India)	Shouvik Ghosh	1	0	0	
DF	(India)	Pritam Kotal	1	0	0	

Last updated: 27 April 2014
Source: Matches

=== Federation Cup stats ===
Win Draw Loss

Opposition	Score
Mumbai	1–0
Shillong Lajong	6–0
Salgaocar	1–1
Churchill Brothers	1–2

Last Updated: 23 January 2014
Source: Statistics

==== Goal scorers ====
Pos.	Nat.	Name	Goal(s)	Appearances(s)
FW	(Nigeria)	Odafa Onyeka Okolie	4	3
FW	(Nigeria)	Christopher Chizoba	3	4
MF	(India)	Ujjal Howladar	1	2
MF	(Japan)	Katsumi Yusa	1	4
TOTAL			9	4

Last updated: 23 January 2014
Source: Matches

==== Disciplinary record ====
Pos.	Nat.	Player	Yellow card	(yellow card) (yellow-red card)	Red card	Notes
FW	(Nigeria)	Christopher Chizoba	1	0	0	
MF	(India)	Ujjal Howladar	1	0	0	
MF	(India)	Zakeer Mundampara	1	0	0	
DF	(India)	Aiborlang Khongjee	1	0	0	

Last updated: 23 January 2014
Source: Matches

=== IFA Shield stats ===
Win Draw Loss

Opposition	Score
United Sikkim	1–0
Mohammedan	0–0
(Bangladesh) Dhanmondi	0–1

Last Updated: 8 February 2014
Source: Statistics

==== Goal scorers ====
Pos.	Nat.	Name	Goal(s)
FW	(India)	Chinadorai Sabeeth	1
TOTAL			1

Last updated: 8 February 2014
Source: Matches

==== Disciplinary record ====
Pos.	Nat.	Player	Yellow card	(yellow card) (yellow-red card)	Red card	Notes
MF	(India)	Ram Malik	1	0	0	
DF	(India)	Kingshuk Debnath	1	0	0	

Last updated: 8 February 2014
Source: Matches

== Player statistics ==
=== Appearances and goals ===
No.	Pos	Nat	Player	Total		CFL		I-League		Fed Cup		2014 IFA Shield	
No.	Pos	Nat	Player	Apps	Goals	Apps	Goals	Apps	Goals	Apps	Goals	Apps	Goals
	GK	(India) IND	Shilton Pal	28	0	10+0	0	13+0	0	4+0	0	1+0	0
	GK	(India) IND	Sandip Nandy	14	0	1+0	0	11+2	0	0+0	0	0+0	0
	GK	(India) IND	Monotosh Ghosh	2	0	0+0	0	0+0	0	0+0	0	2+0	0
	DF	(India) IND	Aiborlang Khongjee	29	0	6+0	0	12+4	0	4+0	0	2+1	0
	DF	(India) IND	Ravinder Singh	5	1	2+0	1	3+0	0	0+0	0	0+0	0
	DF	(Nigeria) NGR	Echezona Anyichie	33	0	5+0	0	21+0	0	4+0	0	3+0	0
	DF	(India) IND	Kingshuk Debnath	35	0	6+4	0	20+1	0	0+1	0	3+0	0
	DF	(India) IND	Rowilson Rodrigues	20	0	8+1	0	5+5	0	0+0	0	0+1	0
	DF	(India) IND	Wahid Sali	10	0	5+0	0	4+0	0	0+0	0	0+1	0
	DF	(India) IND	Pritam Kotal	32	0	5+0	0	19+1	0	4+0	0	3+0	0
	DF	(India) IND	Shouvik Ghosh	30	0	5+1	0	15+3	0	4+0	0	1+1	0
	DF	(India) IND	Rana Gharami	1	0	0+1	0	0+0	0	0+0	0	0+0	0
	DF	(India) IND	Nicolau Borges	6	0	2+1	0	1+2	0	0+0	0	0+0	0
	DF	(India) IND	Bengkok Nameirakpam	1	0	1+0	0	0+0	0	0+0	0	0+0	0
	MF	(India) IND	Denson Devadas	37	1	10+0	1	21+0	0	3+0	0	3+0	0
	MF	(India) IND	Adil Khan	11	1	4+0	1	5+2	0	0+0	0	0+0	0
	MF	(Japan) JPN	Katsumi Yusa	42	7	9+2	5	24+0	1	4+0	1	3+0	0
	MF	(India) IND	Ram Malik	30	5	6+1	3	9+7	2	1+3	0	3+0	0
	MF	(India) IND	Pankaj Moula	25	1	5+2	0	8+3	1	4+0	0	3+0	0
	MF	(India) IND	Manish Bhargav	20	4	5+0	3	8+7	1	0+0	0	0+0	0
	MF	(India) IND	Ujjal Howladar	7	1	0+0	0	1+4	0	0+2	1	0+0	0
	MF	(India) IND	Zakeer Mundampara	26	2	3+2	1	13+1	1	3+1	0	3+0	0
	MF	(India) IND	Bikramjit Singh	5	0	0+0	0	1+4	0	0+0	0	0+0	0
	MF	(India) IND	Adarsh Tamang	2	0	1+1	0	0+0	0	0+0	0	0+0	0
	MF	(India) IND	Rajib Ghorui	6	0	0+3	0	0+3	0	0+0	0	0+0	0
	MF	(India) IND	Arghya Chakraborty	3	0	0+3	0	0+0	0	0+0	0	0+0	0
	MF	(India) IND	Shaiju Mon	6	0	2+1	0	0+2	0	0+0	0	0+1	0
	MF	(India) IND	Anthony Pereira	2	0	1+1	0	0+0	0	0+0	0	0+0	0
	FW	(Nigeria) NGR	Odafa Onyeka Okolie	21	13	4+1	3	12+0	6	3+0	4	0+1	0
	FW	(Nigeria) NGR	Christopher Chizoba	17	8	0+0	0	13+0	5	4+0	3	0+0	0
	FW	(India) IND	Chinadorai Sabeeth	33	8	7+0	3	13+8	4	1+1	0	3+0	1
	FW	(India) IND	Shankar Oraon	22	1	5+3	1	2+6	0	1+2	0	0+3	0
	FW	(India) IND	Prakash Roy	1	0	0+1	0	0+0	0	0+0	0	0+0	0
	FW	(Kenya) KEN	Harrison Muranda	14	5	3+2	4	9+0	1	0+0	0	0+0	0

- Source: mohunbaganac.com

Last Updated: 27 April 2014
Apps: (Matches Started)+(Substitute Appearances)

=== Disciplinary record ===
Pos.	Nat.	Player	CFL			I-League			Fed Cup			IFA Shield			Total			Notes
Pos.	Nat.	Player	Yellow card	(yellow card) (yellow-red card)	Red card	Yellow card	(yellow card) (yellow-red card)	Red card	Yellow card	(yellow card) (yellow-red card)	Red card	Yellow card	(yellow card) (yellow-red card)	Red card	Yellow card	(yellow card) (yellow-red card)	Red card	Notes
DF	(Nigeria)	Echezona Anyichie	1	1	0	3	2	0	0	0	0	0	0	0	4	3	0	Missed Match: vs Sporting Goa (19 October 2013); Missed Match: vs East Bengal (24 November 2013); Missed Match: vs United (6 December 2013); Missed Match: vs Kalighat M.S. (28 December 2013); Missed Match: vs Mohammedan (6 January 2014)
MF	(India)	Denson Devadas	0	0	0	5	1	0	0	0	0	0	0	0	5	1	0	Missed Match: vs Mumbai (26 October 2013); Missed Match: vs East Bengal (1 March 2014)
FW	(India)	Shankar Oraon	1	0	0	0	1	0	0	0	0	0	0	0	1	1	0	Missed Match: vs Dempo (1 November 2013)
DF	(India)	Aiborlang Khongjee	3	0	0	3	0	0	1	0	0	0	0	0	7	0	0	Missed Match: vs Police A.C. (6 October 2013)
DF	(India)	Kingshuk Debnath	3	0	0	3	0	0	0	0	0	1	0	0	7	0	0	Missed Match: vs Kalighat M.S. (28 December 2013)
MF	(India)	Zakeer Mundampara	2	0	0	4	0	0	1	0	0	0	0	0	7	0	0	Missed Match: vs Bhawanipore (10 November 2013); Missed Match: vs Bengaluru FC (6 April 2014)
FW	(Nigeria)	Christopher Chizoba	0	0	0	4	0	0	1	0	0	0	0	0	5	0	0	
MF	(Japan)	Katsumi Yusa	1	0	0	3	0	0	0	0	0	0	0	0	4	0	0	
MF	(India)	Ram Malik	0	0	0	3	0	0	0	0	0	1	0	0	4	0	0	
DF	(India)	Rowilson Rodrigues	1	0	0	2	0	0	0	0	0	0	0	0	3	0	0	
DF	(India)	Wahid Sali	1	0	0	2	0	0	0	0	0	0	0	0	3	0	0	
MF	(India)	Adil Khan	2	0	0	0	0	0	0	0	0	0	0	0	2	0	0	Missed Match: vs United (17 November 2013)
FW	(India)	Chinadorai Sabeeth	0	0	0	1	0	0	0	0	0	0	0	0	1	0	0	
MF	(India)	Manish Bhargav	0	0	0	1	0	0	0	0	0	0	0	0	1	0	0	
MF	(India)	Ujjal Howladar	0	0	0	0	0	0	1	0	0	0	0	0	1	0	0	
MF	(India)	Bikramjit Singh	0	0	0	1	0	0	0	0	0	0	0	0	1	0	0	
MF	(India)	Adarsh Tamang	1	0	0	0	0	0	0	0	0	0	0	0	1	0	0	
DF	(India)	Pritam Kotal	0	0	0	1	0	0	0	0	0	0	0	0	1	0	0	
DF	(India)	Shouvik Ghosh	0	0	0	1	0	0	0	0	0	0	0	0	1	0	0	
DF	(India)	Nicolau Borges	1	0	0	0	0	0	0	0	0	0	0	0	1	0	0	
GK	(India)	Sandip Nandy	1	0	0	0	0	0	0	0	0	0	0	0	1	0	0	

Last updated: 27 April 2014
Source: Matches

== Competitions ==
=== Overall ===
Competition	Started round	Current position / round	Final position / round	First match	Last match
Calcutta Football League	–	–	2nd	10 September 2013	11 January 2014
I-League	–	–	8th	22 September 2013	27 April 2014
Federation Cup	Group stage	–	Semi finals	15 January 2014	23 January 2014
IFA Shield	Group stage	–	Group stage	2 February 2014	8 February 2014

Last Updated: 28 April 2014
Source: Competitions

=== Overview ===
Competition	Record							
Competition	Pld	W	D	L	GF	GA	GD	Win %
Calcutta Football League	11	7	4	0	26	5	+21	63.64
I-League	24	6	10	8	23	24	−1	25.00
Federation Cup	4	2	1	1	9	3	+6	50.00
IFA Shield	3	1	1	1	1	1	+0	33.33
Total	42	16	16	10	59	33	+26	38.10

Last updated: 27 April 2014
Source: Competitions

=== Calcutta Football League ===
2013–14 Calcutta Premier Division

=== I-League ===
Pos	Team	Pld	W	D	L	GF	GA	GD	Pts	Qualification or relegation
6	Shillong Lajong	24	8	9	7	35	37	−2	33	
7	Pune	24	7	8	9	28	32	−4	29	
8	Mohun Bagan	24	6	10	8	23	24	−1	28	
9	Mumbai	24	5	13	6	31	32	−1	28	
10	United (R)	24	5	11	8	22	32	−10	26	Excluded (Note: United, Rangdajied United and Churchill Brothers were barred from I-League they failed to meet Asian Football Confederation's licensing criteria.)

Source: IndiaFooty.com
Rules for classification: 1) points; 2) head-to-head points; 3) goal difference; 4) number of goals scored; 5) taking lots
(R) Relegated

=== Federation Cup ===
==== Group stage (group C) ====
2013–14 Indian Federation Cup Group stage

==== Semifinals ====
Team 1	Score	Team 2
Churchill Brothers	2–1	Mohun Bagan
Sporting Goa	3–2 (a.e.t.)	Dempo

=== IFA Shield ===
==== Group stage (group B) ====
Team	Pld	W	D	L	GF	GA	GD	Pts
(Bangladesh) Sheikh Jamal	3	2	0	1	5	3	+2	6
(India) Mohammedan	3	1	2	0	3	2	+1	5
(India) Mohun Bagan	3	1	1	1	1	1	0	4
(India) United Sikkim	3	0	1	2	2	5	−3	1

Source: RSSSF

=== Results summary ===
Overall								Home						Away					
Pld	W	D	L	GF	GA	GD	Pts	W	D	L	GF	GA	GD	W	D	L	GF	GA	GD
42	16	16	10	59	33	+26	64	12	8	6	42	20	+22	4	8	4	17	13	+4

== Matches ==
Win Draw Loss

=== Calcutta Football League ===
10 September 2013 1	Mohun Bagan	4–1	Railway F.C.	Kolkata
16:00 IST	Sabeeth 1', 73'; Adil 14'; Bhargav 50'; Nicolau (yellow card) 22'; S.Oraon (yellow card) 38'; Kingshuk (yellow card) 68'	Report	Orok 47'	Stadium: Salt Lake Stadium

14 September 2013 2	Mohun Bagan	1–1	George Telegraph	Barasat
16:00 IST	Katsumi 72'	Report	Tauras 38'	Stadium: Barasat Stadium

18 September 2013 3	Mohun Bagan	2–2	Peerless	Kolkata
16:00 IST	Katsumi 59'; Muranda 81'; Wahid (yellow card) 21'; Zakeer (yellow card) 69'; Aibor (yellow card) 78'; Adil (yellow card) 79'; Sandip (yellow card) 86'	Report	Wasim 31'; Chizoba 55'	Stadium: Salt Lake Stadium

3 October 2013 4	Mohun Bagan	3–0	Army XI	Barasat
16:00 IST	Ram 14'; Muranda 25'; Sabeeth 37'; Tamang (yellow card) 40'; Aibor (yellow card) 55'	Report		Stadium: Barasat Stadium

6 October 2013 5	Mohun Bagan	4–0	Police A.C.	Kolkata
16:00 IST	Zakeer 34', (yellow card) 34'; Ram 45'; Muranda 68', 76'	Report		Stadium: Salt Lake Stadium

10 November 2013 6	Mohun Bagan	2–0	Bhawanipore	Barasat
16:00 IST	Denson 44' (pen.); S.Oraon 57'; Eche (yellow card) 29'; Adil (yellow card) 31'	Report		Stadium: Barasat Stadium

17 November 2013 7	Mohun Bagan	0–0	United	Kolkata
16:00 IST	Kingshuk (yellow card) 57'; Rowilson (yellow card) 90+2'	Report		Stadium: Salt Lake Stadium

17 December 2013 8	Mohun Bagan	3–0	Techno Aryan	Barasat
16:00 IST	Bhargav 56' (pen.), 70'; Katsumi 68'; Eche (yellow card) 42' (yellow-red card) 80'; Aibor (yellow card) 45'	Report		Stadium: Barasat Stadium

28 December 2013 9	Mohun Bagan	5–0	Kalighat M.S.	Kolkata
16:00 IST	Ram 38'; R.Singh 49'; Odafa 54', 57', 90'	Report		Stadium: Salt Lake Stadium

6 January 2014 10	Mohun Bagan	1–1	Mohammedan	Kolkata
16:00 IST	Katsumi 26'	Report	Nabi 11'	Stadium: Salt Lake Stadium

11 January 2014 11	East Bengal	0–1	Mohun Bagan	Kolkata
16:00 IST		Report	Katsumi 84', (yellow card) 66'; Eche (yellow card) 42'; Kingshuk (yellow card) 89'	Stadium: Salt Lake Stadium

=== I-League ===
22 September 2013 1	Bengaluru FC	1–1	Mohun Bagan	Bengaluru
16:00 IST	S.Rooney 50'; Meetei (yellow card) 31'; Thoi (yellow card) 25' (yellow-red card) 90+1'	Report	Sabeeth 90+1', (yellow card) 89'; Aibor (yellow card) 17'; Wahid (yellow card) 39'; Zakeer (yellow card) 73'	Stadium: Bangalore Football Stadium; Referee: R.Dsa

28 September 2013 2	Churchill Brothers	0–0	Mohun Bagan	Mapusa
16:00 IST	Satish (yellow card) 66'; Balan (yellow card) 90'	Report	Aibor (yellow card) 34'	Stadium: Duler Stadium; Referee: C.R.Sree Krishna

10 October 2013 3	Pune	2–0	Mohun Bagan	Pune
19:00 IST	T.Haokip 72'; Meyer 79'	Report	Wahid (yellow card) 71'; Eche (yellow card) 39' (yellow-red card) 50'	Stadium: Balewadi Sports Complex; Referee: U.Bora

19 October 2013 4	Mohun Bagan	1–2	Sporting Goa	Kolkata
17:00 IST	Muranda 84' (pen.); Aibor (yellow card) 8'	Report	Karpeh 17', 78'; R.Borges (yellow card) 63'	Stadium: Salt Lake Stadium; Referee: M.V.Santosh Kumar

23 October 2013 5	Mohun Bagan	2–1	Salgaocar	Kolkata
17:00 IST	Sabeeth 55'; Katsumi 76'; Kingshuk (yellow card) 45+1'; Denson (yellow card) 89' (yellow-red card) 90+2'	Report	Duffy 90'; Lamare (yellow card) 74'	Stadium: Salt Lake Stadium; Referee: C.R.Sree Krishna

26 October 2013 6	Mumbai	0–1	Mohun Bagan	Pune
15:30 IST	M.D'Souza (yellow card) 41'; Anwar (yellow card) 64'; A.Mehta (yellow card) 70'	Report	Bhargav 53'; Katsumi (yellow card) 61'; Zakeer (yellow card) 82'; S.Oraon (yellow card) 63' (yellow-red card) 90+2'	Stadium: Balewadi Sports Complex; Referee: T.Nagvenkar

1 November 2013 7	Dempo	0–0	Mohun Bagan	Mapusa
15:30 IST	Colosimo (yellow card) 80'	Report	Eche (yellow card) 66'	Stadium: Duler Stadium; Referee: R.Dsa

6 November 2013 8	Shillong Lajong	1–1	Mohun Bagan	Shillong
17:30 IST	Glen 38' (pen.), (yellow card) 45+1'; Passah (yellow card) 26'; K.Singh (red card) 45+2'	Report	Zakeer 40'; Eche (yellow card) 23' (yellow-red card) 36'	Stadium: Jawaharlal Nehru Stadium; Referee: K.Singh

24 November 2013 9	Mohun Bagan	0–1	East Bengal	Kolkata
17:00 IST		Report	Ralte 73', (yellow card) 74'; Sueoka (yellow card) 44'	Stadium: Salt Lake Stadium; Referee: P.Singh

27 November 2013 10	Mohun Bagan	0–0	Mohammedan	Kolkata
17:00 IST		Report	Tolgay (yellow card) 51'; Luciano (yellow card) 57'; Penn (yellow card) 83'	Stadium: Salt Lake Stadium; Referee: M.V.Santosh Kumar

1 December 2013 11	Mohun Bagan	0–2	Rangdajied United	Kolkata
14:00 IST	Denson (yellow card) 38'; S.Ghosh (yellow card) 50'; Eche (yellow card) 87'; Ram (yellow card) 90'	Report	Manandeep 22', (yellow card) 85'; Lyngdoh 66'	Stadium: Salt Lake Stadium; Referee: M.V.Santosh Kumar

6 December 2013 12	Mohun Bagan	4–0	United	Kolkata
17:30 IST	Chizoba 20', 45+1'; Ram 51', (yellow card) 16'; Odafa 73'; Katsumi (yellow card) 56'	Report	D.Mondal (yellow card) 69'; Brown (yellow card) 82'	Stadium: Salt Lake Stadium; Referee: R.Singh

11 December 2013 13	Mohun Bagan	1–1	Mumbai	Kalyani
13:45 IST	Sabeeth 80'	Report	Rafi 10', (yellow card) 74'; Nidhin (yellow card) 45+1'; Fakruddin (yellow card) 86'	Stadium: Kalyani Stadium; Referee: B.Balasubramaniam

14 December 2013 14	Mohun Bagan	0–1	Dempo	Kolkata
17:00 IST	Kingshuk (yellow card) 54'; Bhargav (yellow card) 77'	Report	Narzary 33'; A.George (yellow card) 23'; Jewel (yellow card) 23' (red card) 90+4'	Stadium: Salt Lake Stadium; Referee: C.R.Sree Krishna

21 December 2013 15	Mohun Bagan	3–1	Pune	Barasat
17:00 IST	Odafa 30', 88'; Ram 75'; Rowilson (yellow card) 11'; Denson (yellow card) 44'; Katsumi (yellow card) 82'; Chizoba (yellow card) 90+4'	Report	T. Haokip 79'; Arata (yellow card) 24'; Douhou (yellow card) 82'; M.Akhtar (yellow card) 83'	Stadium: Barasat Stadium; Referee: U.Bora

16 February 2014 16	Salgaocar	1–0	Mohun Bagan	Vasco
17:00 IST	Dudu 59'	Report		Stadium: Tilak Maidan; Referee: B.Balasubramaniam

21 February 2014 17	Mohun Bagan	2–2	Churchill Brothers	Kolkata
18:00 IST	A.Sawant 37' (o.g.); Chizoba 57' (pen.); Denson (yellow card) 59'; Ram (yellow card) 63'	Report	Balwant 36', 90'; S.Singh (yellow card) 30'; Shabana (yellow card) 32'; L.Thapa (yellow card) 53'; Ravanan (yellow card) 63'	Stadium: Salt Lake Stadium; Referee: U.Bora

1 March 2014 18	East Bengal	1–1	Mohun Bagan	Kolkata
17:00 IST	Moga 39'	Report	Sabeeth 67'	Stadium: Salt Lake Stadium; Referee: M.Santosh Kumar

8 March 2014 19	Mohammedan	0–0	Mohun Bagan	Kolkata
15:00 IST	Maithani (yellow card) 31'; Ishfaq (yellow card) 42'	Report		Stadium: Salt Lake Stadium; Referee: T.Nagvenkar

15 March 2014 20	Rangdajied United	3–1	Mohun Bagan	Shillong
17:00 IST	Tomba 20'; Kim 35'; Ranti 38', (yellow card) 79'; L.Tamba (yellow card) 37'; Restom (yellow card) 81'	Report	Odafa 41'; Denson (yellow card) 9'; Chizoba (yellow card) 88'; Zakeer (yellow card) 90+1'	Stadium: Jawaharlal Nehru Stadium; Referee: B.Balasubramaniam

23 March 2014 21	Sporting Goa	1–3	Mohun Bagan	Margao
17:00 IST	R.Borges 78'; Shirodkar (yellow card) 24'; M.Gonsalves (yellow card) 45'; C.Rao (yellow card) 90+4'	Report	Odafa 44', 79'; Chizoba 70'; B.Singh (yellow card) 16'; Zakeer (yellow card) 90'	Stadium: Jawaharlal Nehru Stadium; Referee: U.Bora

6 April 2014 22	Mohun Bagan	0–2	Bengaluru FC	Kolkata
16:00 IST	Kingshuk (yellow card) 37'; Rowilson (yellow card) 42'; Chizoba (yellow card) 87'	Report	Thoi 45+1'; S.Rooney 60'; Johnson (yellow card) 40'; Robin (yellow card) 79'	Stadium: Salt Lake Stadium; Referee: R.Dsa

13 April 2014 23	United	0–0	Mohun Bagan	Kalyani
14:30 IST	D.Mondal (yellow card) 14'; Kottayil (yellow card) 25'; B.Biswas (yellow card) 43'; Adekunle (yellow card) 59'; D.Singh (yellow card) 84'; J.Sen (yellow card) 88'	Report	Eche (yellow card) 45'	Stadium: Kalyani Stadium; Referee: T.Nagvenkar

27 April 2014 24	Mohun Bagan	2–1	Shillong Lajong	Kolkata
17:00 IST	Moula 6'; Chizoba 75', (yellow card) 26'; Kotal (yellow card) 14'; Denson (yellow card) 70'	Report	B.Haokip 61'; L.Luaha (yellow card) 13'; Matsugae (yellow card) 51'; Glen (yellow card) 70'	Stadium: Salt Lake Stadium; Referee: P.Singh

=== Federation Cup ===
15 January 2014 Group stage	Mohun Bagan	1–0	Mumbai	Kochi
19:00 IST	Chizoba 27'; Zakeer (yellow card) 37'; Aibor (yellow card) 76'	Report		Stadium: Jawaharlal Nehru Stadium

18 January 2014 Group stage	Shillong Lajong	0–6	Mohun Bagan	Kochi
16:00 IST	Odafa 10', 77'; Chizoba 24', 60'; Katsumi 31'; Howladar 90+3'	Report		Stadium: Jawaharlal Nehru Stadium

21 January 2014 Group stage	Salgaocar	1–1	Mohun Bagan	Kochi
19:00 IST	Jairu 79'	Report	Odafa 58'; Howladar (yellow card) 76'	Stadium: Jawaharlal Nehru Stadium

23 January 2014 Semi finals	Churchill Brothers	2–1	Mohun Bagan	Kochi
16:30 IST	Singh 4'; Wolfe 14'	Report	Odafa 33'; Chizoba (yellow card) 22'	Stadium: Jawaharlal Nehru Stadium

=== IFA Shield ===
2 February 2014 Group stage	Mohun Bagan	1–0	United Sikkim	Kolkata
15:15 IST	Sabeeth 27'; Ram (yellow card) 5'; Kingshuk (yellow card) 34'	Report		Stadium: Salt Lake Stadium

5 February 2014 Group stage	Mohun Bagan	0–0	Mohammedan	Kolkata
15:15 IST		Report		Stadium: Salt Lake Stadium

8 February 2014 Group stage	Mohun Bagan	0–1	(Bangladesh) Dhanmondi	Kolkata
15:00 IST		Report	Norde 23'	Stadium: Salt Lake Stadium
