= List of Mohun Bagan Super Giant managers =

Mohun Bagan Super Giant (commonly referred to as Mohun Bagan) is an Indian association football club based in Kolkata, West Bengal. Founded in 1889, it is one of the oldest football clubs in Asia. The club competes in the Indian Super League, the top tier of Indian football league system.

For the major part of the club's footballing history, the team was mostly managed by one of the administrators, like the secretary or the vice-president, or by player-turned-coaches, until professional coaches became common and later became mandated by leagues. The first professional manager appointed for Mohun Bagan was Amal Dutta in 1969 for the first time, who cumulatively managed the team for 24 years between 1969–2006 and is famously remembered for introducing the concept of fullbacks and the innovative 3–4–3 'Diamond' formation to the Indian football during his stints at the club. Under Karim Bencherifa, Mohun Bagan created a record of most consecutive I-League match victories (10) in 2008-09 season. Among the long list of managers, only two could manage Mohun Bagan to win the prestigious I-League, Sanjoy Sen (in 2015) and Kibu Vicuña (in 2020). Under the management of Sanjoy Sen Mohun Bagan became the first Indian club to win a match in ACL and also reached the Round 16 of AFC Cup for the first time in the club's history in 2016. In 2019-20, Kibu Vicuña led Mohun Bagan to their second I-League title win with four matches to spare and matching Dempo's record to fastest I-League title win.

== List ==
Note: The following list includes all the coaches/managers of Mohun Bagan since the reformation of I-League in 2007, when appointment of licensed coaches was mandated for the designation of head coach. Prior to then, the team was often led by administrative personnels who may not be licensed.

Name	Nationality	From	To	Duration	Honours	No. of honours
Chima Okorie	Nigeria	20 February 2007	7 April 2007	46 days		0
Carlos Roberto Pereira	Brazil	1 August 2007	31 May 2008	304 days	2007–08 Calcutta Football League	1
Karim Bencherifa	Morocco	1 July 2008	3 February 2010	582 days	2008 Indian Federation Cup, 2008–09 Calcutta Football League, 2009 Super Cup	3
Satyajit Chatterjee	India	4 February 2010	30 March 2010	54 days		0
Biswajit Bhattacharya	India	31 March 2010	4 June 2010	65 days	2009–10 Calcutta Football League	1
Stanley Rozario	India	4 June 2010	13 December 2010	192 days		0
Sujit Chakraborty	India	24 December 2010	1 June 2011	159 days		0
Steve Darby	England	19 July 2011	15 October 2011	88 days		0
Prasanta Banerjee	India	19 October 2011	26 May 2012	220 days		0
Santosh Kashyap	India	26 May 2012	13 October 2012	140 days	2012 All Airlines Gold Cup	1
Mridul Banerjee	India	19 October 2012	20 November 2012	32 days		0
Karim Bencherifa	Morocco	21 November 2012	27 April 2014	522 days		0
Subhash Bhowmick	India	29 April 2014	7 December 2014	222 days		0
Sanjoy Sen	India	9 December 2014	2 January 2018	1,120 days	2014–15 I-League, 2015–16 Indian Federation Cup	2
Sankarlal Chakraborty	India	3 January 2018	7 January 2019	369 days	2018–19 Calcutta Premier Division	1
Khalid Ahmed Jamil	India	7 January 2019	10 May 2019	123 days		0
Kibu Vicuña	Spain	10 May 2019	31 May 2020	387 days	2019–20 I-League	1
Antonio López Habas	Spain	1 July 2020	18 December 2021	535 days		0
Juan Ferrando	Spain	20 December 2021	3 January 2024	744 days	2022–23 ISL Cup, 2023 Durand Cup	2
Antonio López Habas	Spain	3 January 2024	31 May 2024	149 days	2023–24 Indian Super League	1
José Francisco Molina	Spain	11 June 2024	26 November 2025	533 days	2024–25 Indian Super League, 2024–25 ISL Cup, 2025 IFA Shield	3
Sergio Lobera	Spain	26 November 2025	7 July 2026	223 days		0
Panagiotis Dilmperis	Greece	7 July 2026	present	116 days	2026 IFA Shield	1
