= Cletus Paul =

Indian footballer

Personal information
- Full name: Cletus
- Date of birth: 26 April 1993 (age 33)
- Place of birth: Malad, Mumbai, India
- Position: Striker

Team information
- Current team: NorthEast United
- Number: 19

Youth career
- Mumbai

Senior career*
| Years | Team | Apps | (Gls) |
| 2013–2016 | Mumbai | 7 | (0) |
| 2017 | Young Muslim | | |
| 2017– | Bengaluru FC 'B' | | |
- * Club domestic league appearances and goals as of 2 March 2016

Cletus Dominic Jacob Paul (born 26 April 1993) is an Indian professional footballer who plays as a striker for NorthEast United in the I-League 2nd Division.

== Career ==
=== Mumbai ===
Paul studied in St Annes High School Orlem Malad West where he regularly placed for the school in the interschool championship setup. Paul made his professional debut for Mumbai on 27 April 2014 against Mohammedan at Balewadi Sports Complex in which he came on as a substitute for Dane Pereira in 56th minute and was again replaced by Manuel D'Souza in 85th minute as Mumbai lost the match 1–2.

=== Young Muslim ===
In 2017, Paul played for Young Muslim in the Nagpur Elite Division. He led the club to their third straight championship.

=== Bengaluru FC ===
Cletus joined Bengaluru FC reserve team in October 2017 after impressive show in Nagpur Elite Division for Young Muslims FC. He made his debut for the senior team when he was substituted in during the second half against Transport United F.C. in 2018 AFC Cup preliminary round.

== Professional statistics ==
As of 2 March 2016

| Club | Season | League | | Federation Cup | | Durand Cup | | AFC | | Total | |
| Club | Season | Apps | Goals | Apps | Goals | Apps | Goals | Apps | Goals | Apps | Goals |
|---|---|---|---|---|---|---|---|---|---|---|---|
| Mumbai | 2013–14 | 1 | 0 | 0 | 0 | 0 | 0 | – | – | 1 | 0 |
| Mumbai | 2014–15 | 5 | 0 | 0 | 0 | 0 | 0 | – | – | 5 | 0 |
| Mumbai | 2015–16 | 1 | 0 | 0 | 0 | 0 | 0 | – | – | 1 | 0 |
| Career total | | 7 | 0 | 0 | 0 | 0 | 0 | 0 | 0 | 7 | 0 |
