= Ram Malik =

Indian footballer

Personal information
- Date of birth: 10 March 1991 (age 35)
- Place of birth: Bardhaman, West Bengal, India
- Position: Winger

Team information
- Current team: Calcutta Customs
- Number: 17

Youth career
- 2006–2009: Mohun Bagan
- 2009–2010: United Sports
- 2011: Kalighat MS

Senior career*
| Years | Team | Apps | (Gls) |
| 2012–15 | Mohun Bagan | 53 | (4) |
| 2014 | → Mumbai City FC (loan) | 1 | (0) |
| 2018– | Calcutta Customs | 6 | (1) |
- * Club domestic league appearances and goals as of 07:32, 12 April 2015 (UTC)

Ram Malik (born 10 March 1991) is an Indian professional footballer who plays as a winger for Mohun Bagan in the I-League.

== Career ==
=== Youth ===
Born in Bardhaman, West Bengal, Malik started his career at the youth academy of Mohun Bagan A.C. in 2006. He stayed at the academy till 2009 when he joined the United Sports club. He then joined Kalighat MS in 2011. While with Kalighat, Malik played for the side that won the Airlines Gold Cup in 2011 against Mohammedan S.C. by a score of 3–2 with all three goals for Kalighat being assisted by Malik.

=== Mohun Bagan ===
Malik then made his debut for Mohun Bagan on 28 September 2013 in the league against Churchill Brothers S.C. at the Duler Stadium in which he started and played 48 minutes before being subbed off as Mohun Bagan drew the match 0–0.

== Personal life ==
Malik considers Baichung Bhutia, Steven Gerrard, and Luis Suárez as his idols while he also supports TSV 1860 München, Gamba Osaka. Liverpool F.C as his favorite club.

== Career statistics ==
As of 12 March 2015

| Club | Season | League | | | Federation Cup | | Durand Cup | | AFC | | Total | |
| Club | Season | Division | Apps | Goals | Apps | Goals | Apps | Goals | Apps | Goals | Apps | Goals |
|---|---|---|---|---|---|---|---|---|---|---|---|---|
| Mohun Bagan | 2013–14 | I-League | 16 | 2 | 3 | 0 | — | — | — | — | 19 | 2 |
| Mumbai City FC (loan) | 2014 | I-League | 1 | 0 | — | — | — | — | — | — | 1 | 0 |
| Mohun Bagan | 2014–15 | I-League | 2 | 0 | 0 | 0 | — | — | — | — | 2 | 0 |
| Career total | | | 19 | 2 | 3 | 0 | 0 | 0 | 0 | 0 | 22 | 2 |
