= 2014–15 Royal Wahingdoh FC season =

Indian football club season

Royal Wahingdoh
2014–15 season
- Managing Director: Dominic Sutnga

The 2014–15 season was Royal Wahingdoh's first season in the I-League after winning promotion from the I-League 2nd Division in 2014.

== Background ==
Founded in 1946, Royal Wahingdoh was a club that has always mainly played in the lower state levels of Meghalaya. The club was able to make a push in Indian football after Dominic Sutnga joined the club as managing director in 2008. In 2014, after a few years of trying, Royal Wahingdoh was finally able to make the breakthrough and win promotion to the I-League from the I-League 2nd Division for the first time in its history.

== Squad ==
As of 31 March 2015

Note: Flags indicate national team as defined under FIFA eligibility rules; some limited exceptions apply. Players may hold more than one non-FIFA nationality.

No.	Pos.	Nation	Player
1	GK	IND	Nikhil Bernard
2	MF	IND	Marlanki Suting
4	DF	IND	Bowari Khongstia
5	DF	IND	Ningthoujam Samananda
6	DF	IND	C Lallawmzuala
7	MF	IND	Malsawmtluanga
8	MF	IND	Godwin Franco
9	MF	IND	Nabachandra Singh
10	FW	IND	Jackichand Singh
11	FW	IND	Satiyasen Singh
12	DF	IND	Reagan Singh
13	MF	IND	Loken Meitei
14	MF	IND	Milancy Khongstia
15	MF	IND	Sushil Meitei

No.	Pos.	Nation	Player
16	MF	IND	Laldinmawia
17	FW	IND	Nagen Tamang
18	FW	LBR	Bekay Bewar
19	DF	IND	Lalchhawnkima (captain)
20	DF	NGR	Loveday Enyinnaya
21	MF	TTO	Densill Theobald
22	GK	IND	Prem Kumar Singh
23	FW	PRK	Kim Seng-yong
24	DF	IND	Lalhmangaihsanga
25	FW	IND	Nadong Bhutia
27	DF	IND	Govin Singh
29	DF	IND	Ngouba Singh
30	GK	IND	Bishorjit Singh
32	DF	IND	Naoba Singh

== I-League ==
=== Table ===
Pos	Team	Pld	W	D	L	GF	GA	GD	Pts	Qualification or relegation
1	Mohun Bagan (C)	20	11	6	3	33	16	+17	39	Qualification for AFC Champions League qualifying play-off
2	Bengaluru	20	10	7	3	35	19	+16	37	Qualification for AFC Cup group stage (Note: Bengaluru FC, as the winner of 2014–15 Federation Cup, qualified for the 2016 AFC Cup)
3	Royal Wahingdoh	20	8	6	6	27	27	0	30	
4	East Bengal	20	8	5	7	30	28	+2	29 (Note: East Bengal ahead on goal difference, head-to-head record being the same; Pune 2–3 East Bengal East Bengal 1–2 Pune)	
5	Pune	20	8	5	7	24	26	−2	29	

Source: IndiaFooty.com
Rules for classification: 1) points; 2) head-to-head points; 3) head-to-head goal difference; 4) goal difference; 5) number of goals scored; 6) play-off match.
(C) Champions

== Matches ==
=== 2014–15 Indian Federation Cup ===
28 December 2014	Mumbai	1–2	Royal Wahingdoh	Fatorda Stadium, Goa
19:00 IST	Josimar 71'	Report	Singh 34', 59'

31 December 2014	Royal Wahingdoh	0–1	East Bengal	Fatorda Stadium, Goa
19:00 IST		Report	Dudu 90+6'

4 January 2015	Sporting Goa	2–1	Royal Wahingdoh	Fatorda Stadium, Goa
19:00 IST	Wolfe 53'; Saha 89'	Report	Singh 29'

7 January 2015	Royal Wahingdoh	1–1	Dempo	Fatorda Stadium, Goa
19:00 IST	Bewar 36'	Report	Fernandes 90+1'
