= Ujjal Howladar =

Indian footballer

Personal information
- Date of birth: 1 November 1993 (age 33)
- Place of birth: West Bengal, India
- Position: Midfielder

Senior career*
| Years | Team | Apps | (Gls) |
| 2007–2013 | Techno Aryan | 87 | (14) |
| 2014–2016 | Mohun Bagan | 20 | (4) |
| 2017–2018 | Calcutta Customs Club | 8 | (4) |
| 2018–2019 | Aryan FC | 12 | (6) |
| 2019–2020 | BSS Sporting Club | 8 | (3) |
| 2021–2022 | Aryan FC | 22 | (8) |
| 2022–2023 | Tollygunge Agragami FC | | |
| 2025–2026 | Burdwan Blasters | | |
- * Club domestic league appearances and goals

Ujjal Howladar (born 1 November 1993) is an Indian footballer who plays mainly as a midfielder.

== Career ==
=== Mohun Bagan ===
On 7 January 2014 Howladar signed for Mohun Bagan on loan from Techno Aryan. He made his professional debut for Mohun Bagan in the Indian Federation Cup on 18 January 2014 against Shillong Lajong at the Jawaharlal Nehru Stadium, Kochi in which he came on as a substitute for Zakeer Mundampara in the 75th minute as Mohun Bagan won the match 6–0.

== Career statistics ==
As of 27 April 2014

| Club | Season | League | | | Federation Cup | | Durand Cup | | AFC | | Total | | |
| Club | Season | Apps | Goals | Apps | Goals | Apps | Goals | Apps | Goals | Apps | Goals | | |
|---|---|---|---|---|---|---|---|---|---|---|---|---|---|
| Mohun Bagan | 2013–14 (loan) | 5 | 0 | 2 | 1 | 0 | 0 | - | - | 7 | 1 | | |
| Mohun Bagan | Career total | | | 5 | 0 | 2 | 1 | 0 | 0 | 0 | 0 | 7 | 1 |
