= Radhakrishnan Dhanarajan =

Indian footballer (1980–2019)

Personal information
- Full name: Radhakrishnan Dhanarajan
- Date of birth: 27 October 1980
- Place of birth: Kerala, India
- Date of death: 29 December 2019 (aged 39)
- Place of death: Perinthalmanna, India
- Height: 1.78 m (5 ft 10 in)
- Position: Defender

Senior career*
Years	Team	Apps	(Gls)
2008–2010	Chirag United		
2010–12	Mohun Bagan		
2012–2014	Mohammedan	10	(0)
2014–2015	East Bengal	2	(0)
- * Club domestic league appearances and goals as of 3 May 2015

R Dhanarajan (27 October 1980 – 29 December 2019) was an Indian football player from Palghat, Kerala who played as a defender.

== Career ==
=== Early career ===
Dhanarajan began playing football in CMFC, a D division club in his hometown, and played 3 years there. During his stay, CMFC reached A division. After that, he played for some other local clubs before joining Viva Kerala. He played for 3 years for Viva Kerala and was the captain of the team. During his tenure in Viva Kerala he was coached by Chattuni. He helped the team to get promotion in 1st Division I league and also won the state league.

While playing I league 2nd division, Chirag United officials made him an offer to play for their team in the next season. Though hesitant initially, he agreed to the offer based on advice from his coach Chattuni who, being an experienced coach in Indian football arena, opined that the move would be good for his career. He played for 3 years in Chirag United.

In addition to representing the Kerala football team, Dhanarajan also had the opportunity to play for the West Bengal football team. Dhanarajan and Denson Devadas were the two footballers from Kerala who were part of the West Bengal team that won the Santosh Trophy in 2010.

=== Mohun Bagan ===
In 2010, he joined Mohun Bagan on a two-year contract.

=== Mohammedan ===
Dhanarajan was appointed captain of Mohammedan Sporting Club for 2013–14 I-League season, when the team was promoted to the top division. He also captained the club to victory in the 2013 Durand Cup. He played as a defender.

=== East Bengal ===
On 1 July 2014, it was announced that Dhanarajan had signed for East Bengal F.C.

== Death ==
Radhakrishnan Dhanarajan died due to cardiac arrest on 29 December 2019. Dhanarajan was playing in an All India Sevens Football tournament at Perinthalmanna in Malappuram district of Kerala when he suddenly collapsed after suffering a loss of breath and chest pain. The incident occurred in the 27th minute of the match between FC Perinthalmanna and Sastha Medicals Thrissur. Though the 39-year-old was stretchered off and admitted to a hospital nearby (Moulana Hospital in Perinthalmanna), he could not be revived.

== Club statistics ==
As of 27 April 2014

Club	Season	League			Federation Cup		Durand Cup		AFC		Total	
Club	Season	Division	Apps	Goals	Apps	Goals	Apps	Goals	Apps	Goals	Apps	Goals
Mohammedan	2013–14	I-League	10	0	3	0	—	—	—	—	13	0
East Bengal F.C.	2014–15	I-League	1	0		0	—	—	—	—	1	0
Career total			11	0	3	0	0	0	0	0	14	0
