= Rajib Ghorui =

Indian footballer

Personal information
- Date of birth: 8 October 1995 (age 31)
- Place of birth: Dakshineswar, West Bengal
- Position: Midfielder

Team information
- Current team: Aryan FC
- Number: 17

Youth career
- East Bengal
- 2007–2010: Mohun Bagan

Senior career*
Years	Team	Apps	(Gls)
2010–2013	Techno Aryan		
2013–	Mohun Bagan	3	(0)
2016–2017	Kenkre FC		(1)
2018–2019	George Telegraph	8	(1)
2019–	Aryan FC	10	(2)

International career
2010–2012	India U19		
- * Club domestic league appearances and goals

Rajib Ghorui (Bengali: রাজিব ঘোরুই; born 8 October 1995 in Dakshineswar) is an Indian professional footballer who plays as a midfielder for Aryan FC in the Calcutta Football League.

== Career ==
=== Early career ===
Ghorui was born in Dakshineswar and started playing football at a young age when he joined Jugo Jagaran Coaching Camp where he used to practice under Ranjan Bhattacharya. Rajib who initially used to play as a striker, joined the U-15 East Bengal F.C. team which participated in the Manchester United Premier Cup. He was the highest scorer in the Indian leg of the Manchester United Cup played at Chandigarh.

Rajib joined Mohun Bagan SAIL Football Academy in 2007, where he stayed for one year before joining BN Railways. It was in BN Railways that Rajib was first used as a wing half; he played in both left and right half that year.

In 2010, he represented the U-19 Bengal team in B.C. Roy Trophy. In the final against Chandigarh, he gave West Bengal the lead but unfortunately the opponents equalised in the 2nd half, which took the match to penalty shootout. Though Bengal lost 3–5 in tie-breaker, he was successful in converting his penalty.

Rajib also got selected in the India U-19 team in 2010. During the China tour, in one of the games he scored a stunning goal by a left footed direct free-kick. He once again got a call from the U-19 National Team 2 years later. He had also played in the I-League U19 for East Bengal F.C.

Ghorui joined Techno Aryan F.C. in 2010 where he played for 3 seasons. He played many matches for Aryans in the I-League 2nd Division, IFA Shield as well as Calcutta Football League. One of the most memorable matches of his career was when Aryans defeated East Bengal F.C. 4–1 in Calcutta Premier Division. One of the goals that Charles scored in that game was from Rajib's well-measured right-footed free kick.

=== Mohun Bagan ===
Rajib first got the offer from a United Sikkim F.C. in 2012, though he did not join the club. After Mohun Bagan officials contacted him at the start of this season and he decided to join them.

He made his debut in the I-League on 10 October 2013 against Pune F.C. at the Balewadi Sports Complex in which he came on as a substitute for Sabeeth in the 87th minute as Mohun Bagan lost the match 2–0.

== Career statistics ==
As of 27 April 2014

Club	Season	League			Federation Cup		Durand Cup		AFC		Total	
Club	Season	Apps	Goals	Apps	Goals	Apps	Goals	Apps	Goals	Apps	Goals	
Mohun Bagan	2013-14	3	0	0	0	0	0	-	-	3	0	
Kenkre	2016-17		1	0	0	0	0	-	-		1	
Career total			3	1	0	0	0	0	0	0	3	1

== Personal life ==
Rajib is a fan of Cristiano Ronaldo and Syed Nabi, he is basically a right footed player, though he is confident to shoot with both feet. He supports Manchester United F.C. and England national football team among the International Clubs and Countries.
