= Wahid Sali =

Indian footballer (born 1982)

Personal information
- Full name: Wahid Mohammed Sali
- Date of birth: 11 December 1982 (age 43)
- Place of birth: Kerala, India
- Height: 6 ft 0 in (1.83 m)
- Position: Right back

Team information
- Current team: KRS C Kozhikode
- Number: 28

Senior career*
Years	Team	Apps	(Gls)
2008–2009	Mumbai FC	10	(5)
2009–2012	Universal Soccer School	14	(8)
2012–2013	ONGC	13	(5)
2013–2014	Mohun Bagan	12	(5)
2015–2016	Bhawanipore	4	(1)

Managerial career
- 2020–2021: Kozhikode District Senior Team
- 2020–2022: BASCO (Assistant)
- 2022–: ZGC College
- 2023–2025: Gokulam Kerala FC B(Assistant)
- 2024–: Wayanad District Junior Team
- * Club domestic league appearances and goals

Wahid Mohammed Sali (born 11 December 1982) is an Indian football player who currently player for KRS C Kozhikode In All India Sevens Football

== Career ==
He joined Mumbai FC in January 2008 who earned 16 games and left in December 2008 the club to sign for the Kerala based Universal Soccer School. He is now playing for Bhawanipore.

=== ONGC ===
He signed for newly promoted ONGC F.C. of the I-League in the 2012–2013 season began and he made his debut for the club 29 December 2012 against United Sikkim F.C. in the 13th round of the 2012–13 season coming on as a 90th-minute substitute for Robin Gurung.

=== Mohun Bagan ===
After an impressive season with ONGC, Sali was signed by Mohun Bagan A.C. He made his debut on 22 September 2013 against Bengaluru FC at the Bangalore Football Stadium in which he earned a yellow card in the 39th minute as Mohun Bagan drew the match 1-1. He was adjudged as the Man Of The Match in Mohun Bagan's away match against Churchill Brothers in Goa.

=== Bhawanipore ===
On 7 July 2015 Sali joined Bhawanipore.

== Playing style ==
Wahid Sali is a defender capable of playing as either a right-back or center-back. He began his career in the All India Seven Football circuit in the Malabar region and later established himself in the I-League. He has been noted for his versatility and work ethic on and off the pitch.

== Career statistics ==
=== Club ===
Statistics accurate as of 11 May 2013

Club	Season	League		Federation Cup		Durand Cup		AFC		Total	
Club	Season	Apps	Goals	Apps	Goals	Apps	Goals	Apps	Goals	Apps	Goals
ONGC	2012-13	13	0	0	0	-	-	-	-	13	0
Mohun Bagan	2013-14	4	0	0	0	-	-	-	-	4	0
Career total		17	0	0	0	0	0	0	0	17	0
