= 2014–15 I-League =

8th season of the I-League

I-League
- Season: 2014–15
- Dates: 17 January – 31 May 2015
- Champions: Mohun Bagan; 1st I-League title 4th Indian title
- Relegated: Dempo
- AFC Champions League: Mohun Bagan
- AFC Cup: Bengaluru
- Matches: 110
- Goals: 280 (2.55 per match)
- Top goalscorer: Ranti Martins (East Bengal) (17 goals)
- Biggest home win: Salgaocar 5–1 Bharat (24 May 2015); Shillong Lajong 5–1 East Bengal (30 May 2015); Sporting Goa 4–0 Pune (30 May 2015)
- Biggest away win: Mumbai 0–6 Shillong Lajong (3 April 2015)
- Highest scoring: Pune 5–2 Shillong Lajong (29 January 2015); Mohun Bagan 4–3 Shillong Lajong (27 February 2015)
- Longest winning run: Bengaluru; Pune; Royal Wahingdoh; Mumbai; Mohun Bagan; Sporting Goa (3 games)
- Longest unbeaten run: Bengaluru (13 games)
- Longest winless run: Sporting Goa (13 games)
- Longest losing run: Salgaocar (4 games)
- Highest attendance: 57,780 (Mohun Bagan vs East Bengal) (28 March 2015)
- Average attendance: 5,909

The 2014–15 I-League (known as the Hero I-League for sponsorship reasons) was the eighth season of the I-League, the Indian professional league for association football clubs, since its establishment in 2007. The season began on 17 January 2015, after the conclusion of the 2014–15 Federation Cup and finished on 31 May 2015 with a title deciding match between defending champions Bengaluru and Mohun Bagan. Mohun Bagan scored a late equalising goal to win the championship by two points. It was to be their first I-League title and fourth Indian championship in total

== Teams ==
The official number of teams for the new season will be eleven. After the success of the leagues first direct-entry side, Bengaluru FC, the All India Football Federation held bidding for new teams from 15 May to 2 June 2014 with cities such as Chennai and Ahmedabad in the running. At the same time the federation would review the AFC Club Licensing Criteria and any club which failed to pass the criteria will be banned from entering the league.

On 22 May 2014 the All India Football Federation officially announced that former I-League champions Churchill Brothers, Rangdajied United, and United S.C had been axed from the 2014–15 season for failing to pass the club licensing criteria. Then, in August 2014, it was announced that the AIFF had awarded a direct-entry spot to the Kalyani Group and that they would start a team based in Pune. The team was officially launched in November 2014 as Bharat FC.

In terms of promotion and relegation, Mohammedan were relegated from the I-League the previous season, while Royal Wahingdoh were promoted after winning the 2014 I-League 2nd Division. This would be Wahingdoh's first season in the I-League after remaining unbeaten through the entire 2nd Division campaign.

=== Stadiums and locations ===
Locations of the 2014–15 I-League teams

Note: Table lists clubs in alphabetical order.

Team	Stadium	Capacity
Bengaluru	Sree Kanteerava Stadium	24,000
Bharat	Balewadi Sports Complex	22,000
Dempo	Fatorda Stadium	19,800
East Bengal	Salt Lake Stadium	68,000
Mohun Bagan	Salt Lake Stadium	68,000
Mumbai	Cooperage Ground	5,000
Pune	Balewadi Sports Complex	22,000
Royal Wahingdoh	Jawaharlal Nehru Stadium	30,000
Salgaocar	Fatorda Stadium	19,800
Shillong Lajong	Jawaharlal Nehru Stadium	30,000
Sporting Goa	Fatorda Stadium	19,800

=== Personnel and kits ===
Note: Flags indicate national team as has been defined under FIFA eligibility rules. Players may hold more than one non-FIFA nationality.

Team	Head coach	Captain	Main Sponsor
Bengaluru	(England) Ashley Westwood	(India) Sunil Chhetri	JSW Group
Bharat	(England) Stuart Watkiss	(India) Gouramangi Singh	Kalyani Group
Dempo	(England) Trevor Morgan	(England) Calum Angus	Dempo
East Bengal	(Netherlands) Eelco Schattorie	(India) Harmanjot Khabra	Kingfisher
Mohun Bagan	(India) Sanjoy Sen	(India) Shilton Pal	McDowell's No.1
Mumbai	(India) Khalid Jamil	(India) Climax Lawrence	Playwin
Pune	(Morocco) Karim Bencherifa	(India) Anas Edathodika	Peninsula
Royal Wahingdoh	(India) Santosh Kashyap	(India) Lalchhawnkima	Imperial Blue
Salgaocar	(India) Derrick Pereira	(India) Karanjit Singh	Salgaocar
Shillong Lajong	(India) Thangboi Singto	(North Korea) Son Min-chol	Gionee
Sporting Goa	(India) Mateus Costa	(Trinidad and Tobago) Anthony Wolfe	Models

=== Managerial changes ===
Team	Outgoing manager	Manner of departure	Date of vacancy	Position in table	Incoming manager	Date of appointment
Mohun Bagan	(Morocco) Karim Bencherifa	Sacked	29 April 2014	Pre-season	(India) Sankarlal Chakraborty	27 July 2014
Pune	(Netherlands) Mike Snoei	Sacked	30 May 2014	Pre-season	(Morocco) Karim Bencherifa	10 June 2014
Royal Wahingdoh	(India) Nandakumar Singh	Unknown	25 October 2014	Pre-season	(India) Santosh Kashyap	25 October 2014
Bharat	New team			Pre-season	(England) Stuart Watkiss	4 November 2014
Sporting Goa	(Spain) Óscar Bruzón	Mutual Consent	4 December 2014	Pre-season	(India) Mateus Costa	Unknown
Mohun Bagan	(India) Subhash Bhowmick	Unknown	8 December 2014	Pre-season	(India) Sanjoy Sen	8 December 2014
East Bengal	(India) Armando Colaco	Sacked	19 February 2015	4th	(Netherlands) Eelco Schattorie	19 February 2015
Dempo	(Australia) Arthur Papas	Mutual Consent	2 March 2015	8th	(England) Trevor Morgan	3 March 2015

=== Foreign players ===
Restricting the number of foreign players strictly to four per team, including a slot for a player from AFC countries and a marquee player. A team could use four foreign players on the field during each game including at least one player from the AFC country.

Club	Player 1	Player 2	Player 3	AFC Player
Bengaluru	(England) John Johnson	(England) Josh Walker	(Kenya) Curtis Osano	(Australia) Sean Rooney
Bharat	(Benin) Romuald Boco	(England) Bobby Hassell	(New Zealand) Kris Bright	(Palestine) Omar Jarun
Dempo	(Afghanistan) Zohib Islam Amiri	(Costa Rica) Carlos Hernández	(England) Calum Angus	(Australia) Tolgay Özbey
East Bengal	(New Zealand) Leo Bertos	(Nigeria) Ranti Martins	(Nigeria) Dudu Omagbemi	(Australia) Milan Susak
Mohun Bagan	(Cameroon) Pierre Boya	(Haiti) Sony Norde	(Nigeria) Bello Razaq	(Japan) Katsumi Yusa
Mumbai	(Brazil) Josimar	(Nigeria) Chika Wali		(Japan) Taisuke Matsugae
Pune	(Brazil) Luciano Sabrosa	(Montenegro) Darko Nikač	(Portugal) Edgar Marcelino	(Japan) Ryuji Sueoka
Royal Wahingdoh	(Liberia) Bekay Bewar	(Nigeria) Loveday Enyinnaya	(Trinidad and Tobago) Densill Theobald	(North Korea) Kim Seng-yong
Salgaocar	(Ivory Coast) Douhou Pierre	(Scotland) Darryl Duffy	(Zambia) Francis Kasonde	(Yemen) Khaled Baleid
Shillong Lajong	(Brazil) Uilliams	(Nigeria) Penn Orji	(Trinidad and Tobago) Cornell Glen	(North Korea) Son Min-chol
Sporting Goa	(Nigeria) Odafa Okolie	(Portugal) Miguel Garcia	(Trinidad and Tobago) Anthony Wolfe	(Syria) Mahmoud Amnah

== League table ==
Pos	Team	Pld	W	D	L	GF	GA	GD	Pts	Qualification or relegation
1	Mohun Bagan (C)	20	11	6	3	33	16	+17	39	Qualification for AFC Champions League qualifying play-off
2	Bengaluru	20	10	7	3	35	19	+16	37	Qualification for AFC Cup group stage (Note: Bengaluru FC, as the winner of 2014–15 Federation Cup, qualified for the 2016 AFC Cup)
3	Royal Wahingdoh	20	8	6	6	27	27	0	30	
4	East Bengal	20	8	5	7	30	28	+2	29 (Note: East Bengal ahead on goal difference, head-to-head record being the same; Pune 2–3 East Bengal East Bengal 1–2 Pune)	
5	Pune	20	8	5	7	24	26	−2	29	
6	Mumbai	20	5	9	6	22	27	−5	24 (Note: Mumbal ahead on head-to-head goal difference; Mumbai–Salgaocar 3–0, Salgaocar–Mumbai 3–1)	
7	Salgaocar	20	7	3	10	25	27	−2	24	
8	Sporting Goa	20	5	8	7	22	27	−5	23 (Note: Sporting Goa ahead on head-to-head record; Sporting Goa–Shillong Lajong 1–1, Shillong Lajong–Sporting Goa 1–2)	
9	Shillong Lajong	20	6	5	9	34	29	+5	23	
10	Dempo (R)	20	3	10	7	15	26	−11	19	Relegation to I-League 2nd Division
11	Bharat (Note: Bharat FC were not relegated as they had relegation immunity for two years.)	20	4	6	10	13	28	−15	18	

Source: IndiaFooty.com
Rules for classification: 1) points; 2) head-to-head points; 3) head-to-head goal difference; 4) goal difference; 5) number of goals scored; 6) play-off match.
(C) Champions; (R) Relegated

== Results ==
Home \ Away	BFC	KBFC	DEM	EB	MB	MUM	PFC	RWFC	SFC	SLFC	SCG
Bengaluru		1–0	0–0	3–0	1–1	1–1	1–3	3–3	3–1	2–0	4–1
Bharat	0–2		0–0	0–3	1–0	0–2	1–0	1–2	2–0	1–1	1–0
Dempo	1–1	0–0		1–5	1–1	0–0	1–2	3–2	0–0	0–2	3–0
East Bengal	1–0	1–1	3–1		1–1	1–1	1–2	2–0	1–0	2–1	2–2
Mohun Bagan	4–1	2–0	2–0	1–0		3–1	1–0	2–0	3–1	0–0	2–0
Mumbai	1–1	2–1	0–1	2–1	1–1		1–1	2–1	3–0	0–6	0–0
Pune	0–2	1–1	0–0	2–3	0–2	3–2		1–0	1–0	5–2	1–1
Royal Wahingdoh	0–4	1–1	1–1	1–0	3–2	1–1	2–0		4–2	1–1	2–0
Salgaocar	0–1	5–1	2–0	3–1	0–0	3–1	1–1	0–1		2–1	0–2
Shillong Lajong	1–1	3–1	3–0	5–1	3–4	1–0	0–1	1–2	1–3		1–2
Sporting Goa	1–3	2–0	2–2	1–1	2–1	1–1	4–0	0–0	0–2	1–1	

Source: Soccerway
Legend: Blue = home team win; Yellow = draw; Red = away team win.

== Season statistics ==
As of 31 May 2015

=== Scoring ===
==== Top scorers ====
Rank	Player	Team	Goals
1	(Nigeria) Ranti Martins	East Bengal	17
2	(Trinidad and Tobago) Cornell Glen	Shillong Lajong	16
3	(Haiti) Sony Norde	Mohun Bagan	9
3	(Nigeria) Dudu Omagbemi	East Bengal	9
5	(Brazil) Josimar	Mumbai	8
5	(Nigeria) Odafe Onyeka Okolie	Sporting Goa	8
7	(Scotland) Darryl Duffy	Salgaocar	7
7	(India) Thongkhosiem Haokip	Pune	7
7	(Brazil) Uilliams	Shillong Lajong	7
7	(Japan) Katsumi Yusa	Mohun Bagan	7

==== Top Indian Scorers ====
Rank	Player	Team	Goals
1	(India) Thongkhosiem Haokip	Pune	7
2	(India) Eugeneson Lyngdoh	Bengaluru	6
2	(India) Balwant Singh	Mohun Bagan	6
2	(India) Robin Singh	Bengaluru	6
2	(India) Satiyasen Singh	Royal Wahingdoh	6
6	(India) Jackichand Singh	Royal Wahingdoh	5
6	(India) Thoi Singh	Bengaluru	5
8	(India) Bikash Jairu	Salgaocar	4

==== Hat-tricks ====
Player	For	Against	Result	Date	Ref.
(India) Thongkhosiem Haokip	Pune	Shillong Lajong	5–2	29 January 2015	
(Nigeria) Ranti Martins ^{5}	East Bengal	Dempo	5–1	1 March 2015	
(India) Satiyasen Singh	Royal Wahingdoh	Salgaocar	4–2	3 May 2015	
(Trinidad and Tobago) Cornell Glen	Shillong Lajong	Bharat	3–1	17 May 2015	
(Nigeria) Odafe Onyeka Okolie	Sporting Goa	Pune	4–0	30 May 2015	
(Trinidad and Tobago) Cornell Glen	Shillong Lajong	East Bengal	5–1	30 May 2015	

^{5} Player scored 5 goals

=== Discipline ===
- Most yellow cards (7)
  - Dharmaraj Ravanan (Bharat)
  - Robin Singh (Bengaluru)
- Most red cards (2)
  - Dhanpal Ganesh (Pune)
- Worst disciplinary record (2 red cards & 5 yellow cards)
  - Dhanpal Ganesh (Pune)

=== Fair play ===
The Fair Play qualities of the participating teams and which are pertinent to the spectators will be evaluated using the FIFA Fair Play evaluation form. East Bengal led the Fair Play rankings at the end of the season.

Rank	Team	Games	Total Points
1	East Bengal	20	1451.1
2	Royal Wahingdoh	20	1450.0
3	Pune	20	1438.6
4	Salgaocar	20	1427.5
5	Bharat	20	1415.0
6	Mumbai	20	1394.3
7	Shillong Lajong	20	1377.5
8	Bengaluru	20	1367.9
9	Dempo	20	1342.5
10	Mohun Bagan	20	1337.9
10	Sporting Goa	20	1337.9

== Awards ==
=== AIFF Awards ===
All India Football Federation awarded the following awards for the I-League season.

- Best player of I-League: Jackichand Singh (Royal Wahingdoh)
- Best goalkeeper of I-League: Debjit Majumder (Mohun Bagan)
- Best defender of I-League: Bello Razaq (Mohun Bagan)
- Best midfielder of I-League: Eugeneson Lyngdoh (Bengaluru)
- Best forward of I-League: Ranti Martins (East Bengal)
- Best coach of I-League: Sanjoy Sen (Mohun Bagan)

== See also ==
- 2014–15 Bengaluru FC season
- 2014–15 Bharat FC season
- 2014–15 Dempo S.C. season
- 2014–15 East Bengal F.C. season
- 2014–15 Mohun Bagan A.C. season
- 2014–15 Mumbai F.C. season
- 2014–15 Pune F.C. season
- 2014–15 Royal Wahingdoh F.C. season
- 2014–15 Salgaocar F.C. season
- 2014–15 Shillong Lajong F.C. season
- 2014–15 Sporting Clube de Goa season
