= SSB Ranidanga Stadium =

Football stadium in Assam, India

- Interactive map of SSB Ranidanga Stadium
- Coordinates: 26°41′03″N 88°22′00″E
- Owner: Sashastra Seema Bal
- Capacity: 2,000
- Surface: Green

SSB Ranidanga Stadium is a football stadium in Golaghat, Assam. It can host 2,000 spectators.

== Owner ==
The stadium is owned by Sashastra Seema Bal.

== I-League 2nd Division ==
The stadium was one of the two venues for 2015 I-League 2nd Division.
