= Gonzalo Hinojal =

Spanish footballer (born 1986)

Personal information
- Full name: Gonzalo Hinojal Neila
- Date of birth: 14 April 1986 (age 40)
- Place of birth: Béjar, Spain
- Height: 1.89 m (6 ft 2 in)
- Position: Centre-back

Youth career
- Béjar Industrial
- Salamanca

Senior career*
Years	Team	Apps	(Gls)
2005–2006	Salamanca B		
2006–2007	Santa Marta		
2007–2008	Guijuelo	31	(0)
2008–2009	Zamora	31	(2)
2009–2010	Terrassa	4	(0)
2010–2012	Villaralbo	51	(3)
2012–2013	Guijuelo	35	(1)
2013–2014	Sporting Goa	22	(0)
2014–2015	Guijuelo	24	(1)
2015–2018	Talavera	9	(0)
2018–2019	Móstoles	9	(0)
- * Club domestic league appearances and goals

Gonzalo Hinojal Neila (born 14 April 1986), sometimes known simply as Gonzalo, is a Spanish former professional footballer who played as a centre-back.

== Club career ==
Hinojal was born in Béjar, Salamanca, Castile and León. A UD Salamanca youth graduate, he made his debuts as a senior with the reserves in the 2005–06 campaign, in Tercera División.

In the 2007 summer, after a spell at UD Santa Marta, Hinojal first arrived in Segunda División B, after agreeing to a contract with CD Guijuelo. In August of the following year he moved to fellow league team Zamora CF.

In 2009 Hinojal joined Terrassa FC, also in the third tier. On 27 July 2010, after appearing rarely, he signed for GCE Villaralbo in the fourth division.

On 18 July 2012 Hinojal returned to Guijuelo. On 16 August of the following year he moved abroad for the first time in his career, signing for Indian I-League side Sporting Clube de Goa.

Hinojal made his professional debut for the side on 21 September 2013, playing the full 90 minutes in a 1–1 home draw against Mumbai FC. He appeared in 22 matches during the campaign, as his side finished fifth.

On 5 August 2014, already as a free agent, Hinojal returned to the chacineros. On 16 July of the following year he moved to CF Talavera de la Reina.

== Career statistics ==
As of 19 November 2015

Club	Season	League			Cup		Other		Total	
Club	Season	Division	Apps	Goals	Apps	Goals	Apps	Goals	Apps	Goals
Guijuelo	2007–08	Segunda División B	31	0	—				31	0
Zamora	2008–09	Segunda División B	29	2	1	0	2	0	32	2
Terrassa	2009–10	Segunda División B	4	0	—				4	0
Guijuelo	2012–13	Segunda División B	35	1	—				35	1
Sporting Goa	2013–14	I-League	22	0	6	0	—		28	0
Guijuelo	2014–15	Segunda División B	24	1	1	0	—		25	1
Talavera	2015–16	Segunda División B	9	0	0	0	—		9	0
Career total			154	4	8	0	2	0	164	4
