= 2015 I-League 2nd Division =

8th season of the I-League 2nd Division

I-League 2nd Division
- Season: 2014–15
- Champions: Aizawl
- Promoted: Aizawl
- Matches: 56
- Goals: 209 (3.73 per match)
- Highest scoring: Hindustan 2–6 Chanmari (1 April 2015) United 5–3 Kenkre (7 April 2015) PIFA 3–5 Aizawl (27 April 2015)
- Longest winning run: Aizawl (6 games)
- Longest unbeaten run: Aizawl (6 games)
- Longest winless run: PIFA (14 games)
- Longest losing run: Kenkre (6 games)

The 2015 I-League 2nd Division was the eighth season of the I-League 2nd Division, the second division of football in India. Eight clubs participated this season, including Mohammedan, after they were relegated from the I-League last season. Aizawl won the league and will be the first team from Mizoram to play in I-League in 2015–16 I-League season.

== Venues ==
The double-leg league was held in two venues Kanchenjunga Stadium, Siliguri and SSB Ranidanga Stadium, Golaghat respectively. The initial seven rounds of matches were held in Siliguri, the return legs were held in Golaghat.

== Team overview ==
=== Location and coaches ===
Team	Location	Head coach
Aizawl	Aizawl, Mizoram	(India) Hmingthana Zadeng
Chanmari	Aizawl, Mizoram	(India) Gaurav Chatterjee
Hindustan	Delhi	(India) Abhijoy Basu
Kenkre	Mumbai, Maharashtra	(India) Ekendra Singh
Lonestar Kashmir	Jammu and Kashmir	(India) Hilal Rasool
Mohammedan	Kolkata, West Bengal	(India) Ananta Kumar Ghosh
PIFA	Mumbai, Maharashtra	(India) Nirvan Shah
United	Kolkata, West Bengal	(India) Satyabrata Bhowmick

== League table ==
Pos	Team	Pld	W	D	L	GF	GA	GD	Pts	Qualification or relegation
1	Aizawl (C, P)	14	11	1	2	45	20	+25	34	Qualification to 2015–16 I-League
2	Lonestar Kashmir	14	8	3	3	22	14	+8	27	
3	Chanmari	14	7	4	3	35	24	+11	25	
4	Mohammedan (Note: Mohammedan were deducted three points for the payment default to a player.)	14	8	2	4	29	17	+12	23	
5	United	14	5	2	7	24	28	−4	17	
6	Hindustan	14	4	3	7	18	28	−10	15	
7	Kenkre	14	3	1	10	21	39	−18	10	
8	PIFA	14	0	4	10	15	39	−24	4	

Source: I-League
Rules for classification: 1) points; 2) goal difference; 3) number of goals scored
(C) Champions; (P) Promoted

== Results ==
Home \ Away	AFC	CFC	HIN	KFC	LKFC	MSC	PIFA	USC
Aizawl		2–3	5–0	2–0	4–1	2–1	6–1	0–0
Chanmari	2–4		1–2	4–1	1–2	2–2	3–3	5–1
Hindustan	2–3	2–6		2–3	1–3	1–0	1–0	0–2
Kenkre	1–4	1–2	0–3		1–1	0–4	5–4	0–3
Lonestar Kashmir	2–0	0–1	0–0	1–0		1–2	1–0	3–2
Mohammedan	2–4	1–1	1–0	4–3	1–2		2–0	2–0
PIFA	3–5	1–1	2–2	0–3	1–1	0–5		0–1
United	2–4	2–3	2–2	5–3	0–4	1–2	3–0	

Source: Soccerway
Legend: Blue = home team win; Yellow = draw; Red = away team win.
