= Sun Moon University =

University in Asan, South Korea

- Type: Private
- Established: April 3, 1972; 54 years ago
- President: Sun Jo Hwang
- Location: 100, Kalsan-ri, Tangjeong-myeon, Asan, 336-708 South Chungcheong Province, South Korea; 36°47′56″N 127°04′30″E
- Campus: Rural (Asan Campus)
- Website: sunmoon.ac.kr

Korean name
- Hangul: 선문대학교
- Hanja: 鮮文大學校
- RR: Seonmun daehakgyo
- MR: Sŏnmun taehakkyo

Sun Moon University (Korean: 선문대학교) is a university located in Asan, South Chungcheong Province, South Korea.

== Sport ==
The university's football team participated in the 2014 IFA Shield tournament.

== Notable alumni ==
- Oh Jung-se, actor.
- Kim Jong-woo, South Korean footballer.
- Jo Hyeon-woo, South Korean footballer.
