= Bekay Bewar =

Liberian footballer

Personal information
- Date of birth: 20 December 1992 (age 33)
- Place of birth: Liberia
- Height: 1.75 m (5 ft 9 in)
- Position: Forward

Team information
- Current team: Royal Wahingdoh
- Number: 18

Senior career*
Years	Team	Apps	(Gls)
2013–2015	Royal Wahingdoh	27	(5)
- * Club domestic league appearances and goals as of 24 May 2015

Bekay Bewar (born 20 December 1992) is a Liberian former footballer who played predominantly as a forward. He last played for Royal Wahingdoh in the Indian I-League.

== Career ==
From Liberia, Bewar played for Indian side Royal Wahingdoh in the I-League 2nd Division. After helping the side gain promotion to the I-League, Bewar was retained by the Shillong side. He made his professional debut for Royal Wahingdoh against Mumbai in the Federation Cup on 28 December 2014.

== Statistics ==
Statistics accurate as of 24 May 2015

Club	Season	League			Federation Cup		Durand Cup		AFC		Total	
Club	Season	Division	Apps	Goals	Apps	Goals	Apps	Goals	Apps	Goals	Apps	Goals
Royal Wahingdoh	2013–14	I-League 2nd Division	8	3	0	0	–	–	–	–	8	3
Royal Wahingdoh	2014–15	I-League	19	2	4	0	0	0	–	–	23	2
Career total			27	5	4	0	0	0	0	0	31	5
