= Manuel D'Souza =

Indian football coach and former player

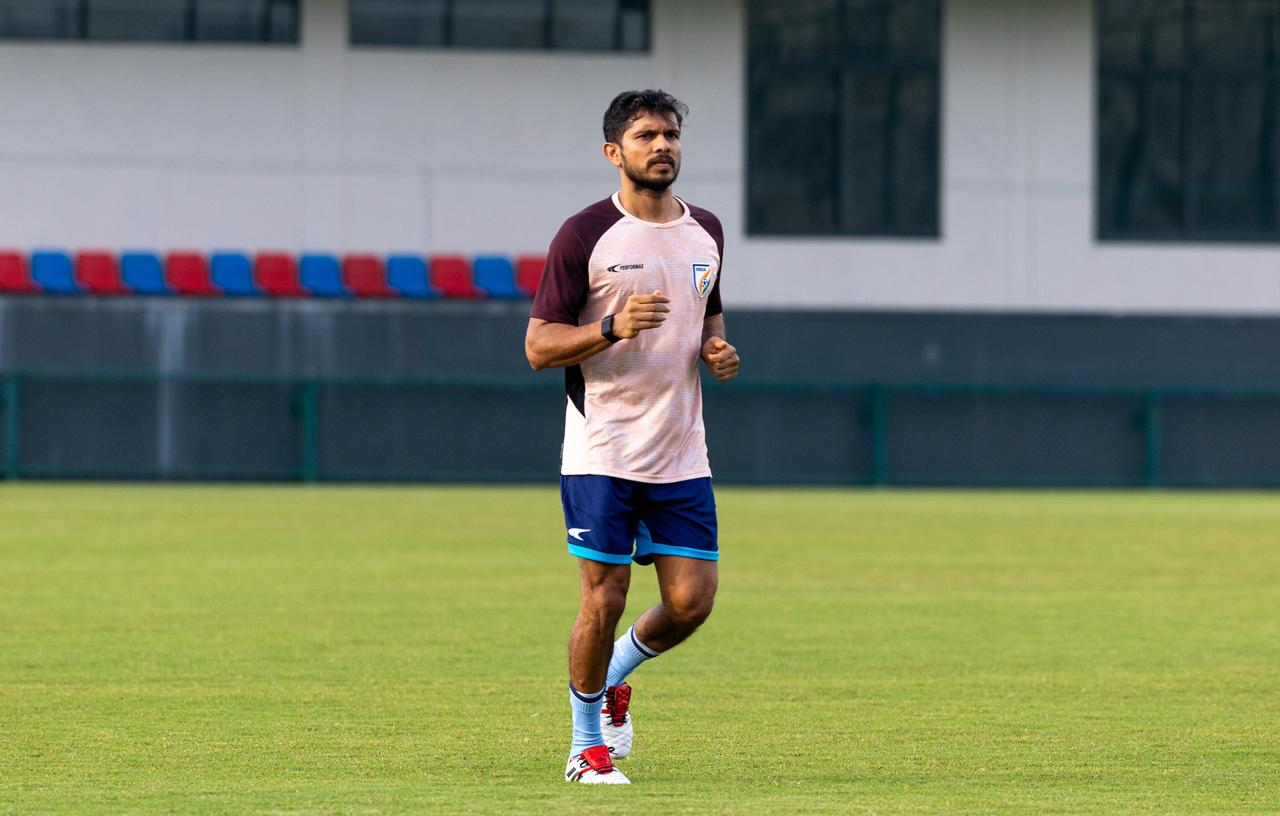

Personal information
- Full name: Manuel D'Souza
- Date of birth: 5 December 1989 (age 36)
- Place of birth: Mumbai, Maharashtra, India
- Height: 1.76 m (5 ft 9 in)
- Position: Forward

Team information
- Current team: India (strength and conditioning coach)

Youth career
- 2010–2012: Mumbai

Senior career*
Years	Team	Apps	(Gls)
2012–2018	Mumbai	188	(52)
Total		188	(52)

Managerial career
- 2025–: India (strength and conditioning coach)
- * Club domestic league appearances and goals as of 27 April 2024 ‡ National team caps and goals as of 3 April 2026

Manuel D'Souza (born 5 December 1989) is an Indian professional football coach and former player who is currently the strength and conditioning coach of the India national football team. He previously played as a forward for Mumbai in the I-League.

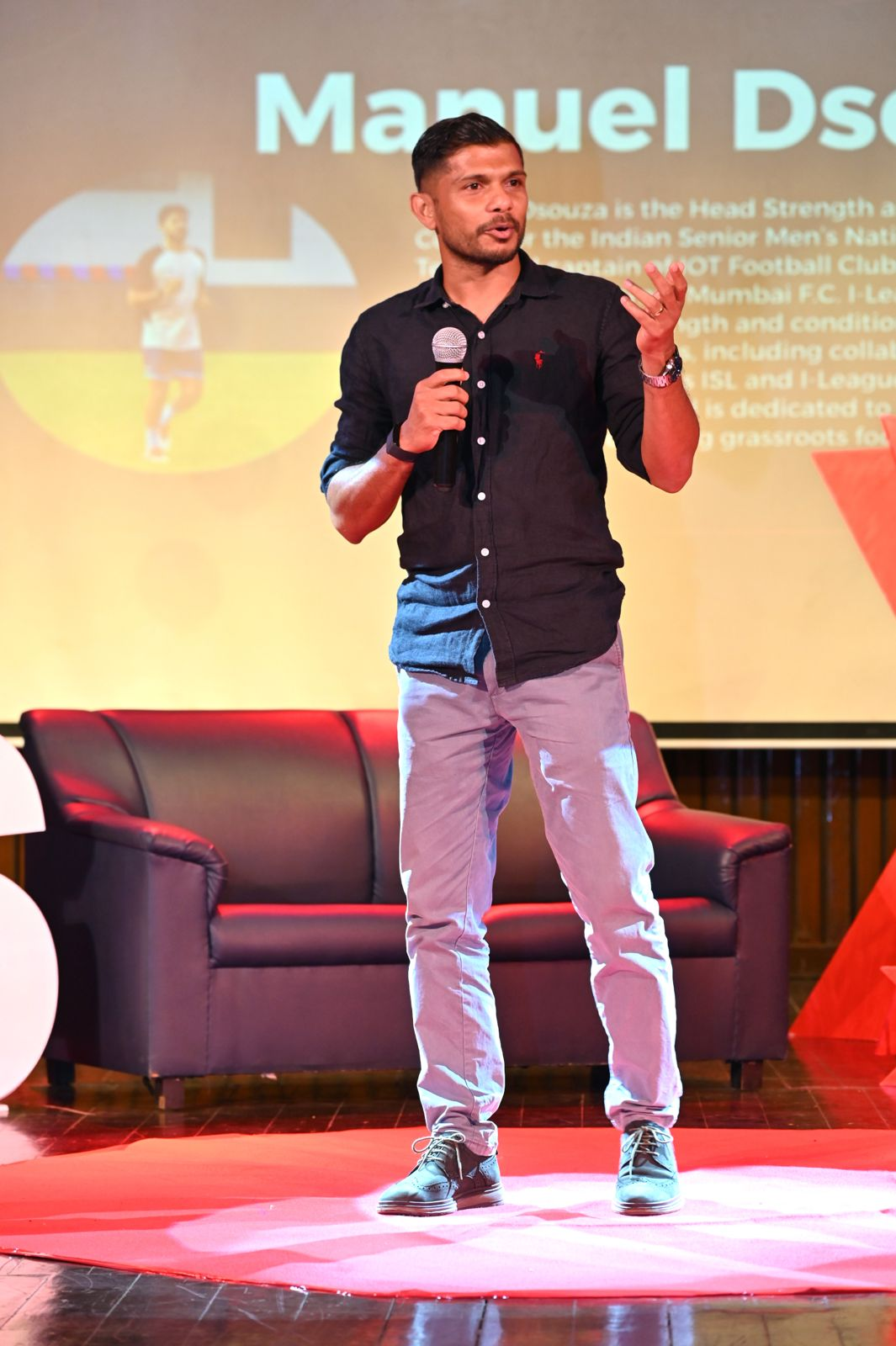
Manuel D'Souza at a football event

== Career ==
In August 2025, D'Souza was appointed to the coaching staff of the India national football team under head coach Khalid Jamil. He was part of the technical staff for the 23-member squad selected for the AFC Asian Cup qualifiers against Hong Kong.

His coaching focus is on high-performance physical conditioning, specifically the "Fitter, Faster, Stronger" mission for the national team. Having transitioned from a professional player to a coach, he also contributes to scouting and technical development within the Indian football ecosystem.

== Career ==
Manuel D'Souza is a former professional footballer who played as a forward, primarily known for his long stint with Mumbai F.C. in the I-League. In August 2025, he was appointed to the coaching staff of the India national football team under head coach Khalid Jamil.

He was part of the technical staff for the 23-member squad selected for the AFC Asian Cup qualifiers against Hong Kong. His coaching focus is on high-performance physical conditioning, often associated with the "Fitter, Faster, Stronger" mission for the national team.

== Coaching career ==
In August 2025, Manuel D'Souza was appointed to the coaching staff of the India national football team under head coach Khalid Jamil. He was part of the staff for the 23-member squad selected for the AFC Asian Cup qualifiers against Hong Kong.

His coaching methodology focuses on high-performance training, with a mission titled "Fitter, Faster, Stronger" aimed at improving the physical conditioning of the national team players. Having transitioned from an I-League player to a national coach, he also contributes to scouting and technical development within the Indian football ecosystem.

== Career ==
=== Mumbai ===
D'Souza started his footballing career with Mumbai F.C. of the I-League. He started making a name for himself with the under-19 side in the Mumbai Elite Division in 2010. D'Souza made his first-team debut for the club on 6 May 2012 in Mumbai's last I-League match of the 2011–12 season and scored within 8 minutes to give Mumbai the early lead but that was not enough as Mumbai lost the match 5–2 in the end.

=== National Team ===
In August 2025, D'Souza was appointed as the Strength and Conditioning coach for the India national football team following the appointment of Khalid Jamil as head coach. He joined the national camp at the Padukone-Dravid Centre of Excellence in Bengaluru.

== Career statistics ==
=== Club ===
As of 27 April 2014

Club	Season	League		Federation Cup		Durand Cup		AFC		Total	
Club	Season	Apps	Goals	Apps	Goals	Apps	Goals	Apps	Goals	Apps	Goals
Mumbai	2011–12	1	1	0	0	0	0	—	—	1	1
2012–13	1	0	0	0	0	0	-	-	1	0	
2013–14	7	0	0	0	0	0	-	-	7	0	
Career total		9	1	0	0	0	0	0	0	9	1
