= Sanjoy Sen =

Indian footballer and manager

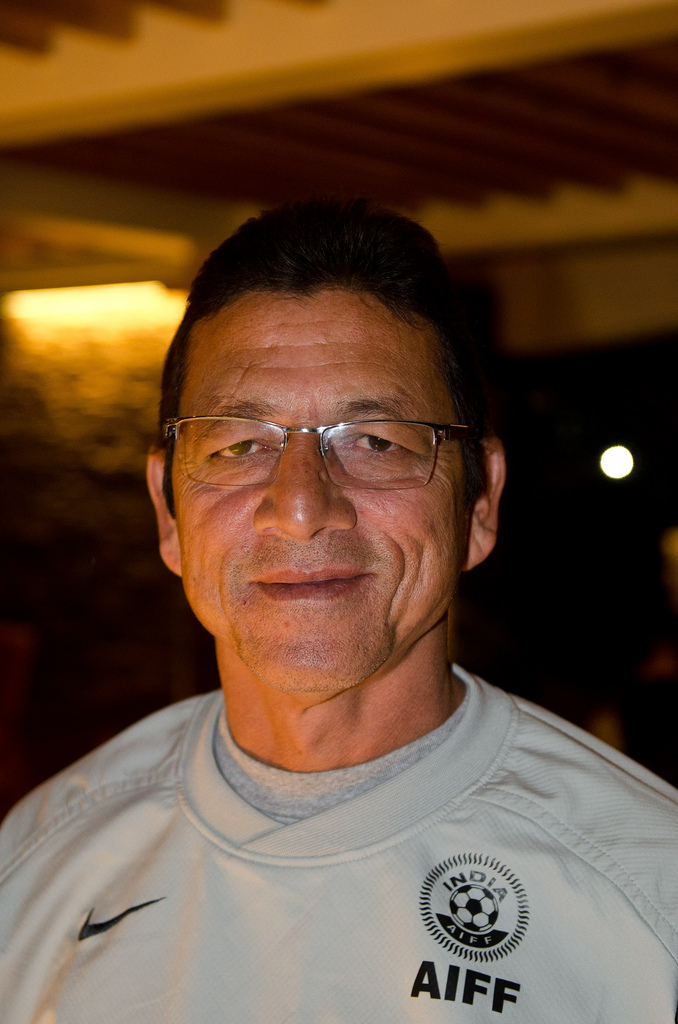
- Sen in 2011

Personal information
- Full name: Sanjoy Sen
- Date of birth: 12 December 1960 (age 65)
- Place of birth: India

Managerial career
- Years: Team
- 2010–2012: Prayag United
- 2013: Pailan Arrows
- 2013–2014: Mohammedan
- 2014–2018: Mohun Bagan
- 2018–2019: ATK (Technical Director)
- 2019–2020: ATK FC (assistant)
- 2020–2021: Mohun Bagan (assistant)
- 2021–2023: Mohun Bagan (director of youth development)
- 2024: West Bengal

Sanjoy Sen (Bengali: সঞ্জয় সেন; born 12 December 1960) is an Indian football manager. Under his leadership Mohun Bagan won the title of Hero I-League 2014–15 and Hero Federation Cup 2015–16. In 2024, he successfully led the West Bengal football team to victory in the Santosh Trophy, securing their 33rd title in the prestigious tournament's history.

== Coaching career ==
=== Prayag United ===
In the summer of 2010 Sen signed with I-League club Prayag United who were then known as Chirag United Sports Club as they were then sponsored and owned by Chirag Computers. After his first season in charge he led Prayag to an eighth-place finish out of fourteen teams in the I-League.

=== Mohammedan Sporting Club ===
Mohammedan Sporting had appointed Sen as their new head coach for the remainder of the 2012/13 season. Sen's aim for the rest of the season was to gain promotion with Mohammedan Sporting to the I-League from the 2nd Division. He succeeded as the century-old side won the I-League 2nd Division, and earned promotion to the I-League 2013-14 along with Rangdajied. On 15 May 2013, he resigned as Mohammedan coach, he had revealed to The Telegraph that with his son Class X Board examinations approaching, it would be difficult for him to continue as the Mohammedan Sporting coach.

On 16 August 2013, Sen was appointed as Mohammedan's head coach for the rest of the season. After that he won 2013 Durand Cup and he also won 2014 IFA Shield

=== Mohun Bagan ===
On 8 December 2014, Sen was appointed as the coach for Mohun Bagan. He won 2014–15 I-League with Mohun Bagan. The club won the trophy after 13 Year since they last won under the coach Subrata Bhattacharya in 2001–02. He also won 2015–16 Indian Federation Cup as Mohun Bagan defeated Aizawl in final. He resigned on 2 January 2018.

== Honours ==
=== Manager ===
Mohammedan

- I-League 2nd Division runner-up: 2013
- Durand Cup: 2013
- IFA Shield: 2014

Mohun Bagan

- I-League: 2014–15; runners up: 2015–16, 2016–17
- Federation Cup: 2015–16

West Bengal

- Santosh Trophy: 2024–25

Individual

- Best Coach of 2014-15 I-League
- Best Coach of 2013 I-League 2nd Division
