= 2014–15 Dempo SC season =

Indian football club season

Dempo
2014–15 season
- Chairman: Srinivas Dempo

The 2014–15 season will be Dempo's eighth season in the I-League and 47th season in existence.

== Transfers ==
Dempo began their squad changes for the 2014–15 season as early as April when they signed Tata Football Academy graduate Vinit Rai.

=== In ===
No.	Position	Player	Signed from	Date	Ref
	MF	(India) Vinit Rai	(India) Tata Football Academy	19 April 2014	
