= 2014–15 in Indian football =

Football in India
- Season: 2014–15

Men's football
- I-League: Mohun Bagan
- I-League 2nd Div.: Aizawl
- Federation Cup: Bengaluru

The 2014–15 season is the 127th competitive association football season in India.

== Changes in the I-League ==
Teams promoted to the 2014–15 I-League:

- Royal Wahingdoh

Teams expelled from the 2014–15 I-League:

- Churchill Brothers
- Rangdajied United
- United S.C.

Teams relegated from the 2014–15 I-League:

- Mohammedan

== Internationals ==
=== Men ===
==== International Friendlies ====
6 October International Friendly	India	2–3	Palestine	Siliguri, India
17:30	Chhetri 32'; Fernandes 36'	Report	Alfawaghra 8'; Wridat 52'; Yousef 72'	Stadium: Kanchenjunga Stadium

==== 2018 FIFA World Cup qualifier ====
12 March 2018 FIFA World Cup Qualifier – AFC first round	India	2–0	Nepal	Guwahati, India
19:00 UTC+5:30	Chhetri 53', 71'	Report (FIFA); Report (AFC)		Stadium: Indira Gandhi Athletic Stadium; Attendance: 11,200; Referee: Aziz Asimov (Uzbekistan)

17 March 2018 FIFA World Cup Qualifier – AFC first round	India	0–0	Nepal	Kathmandu, Nepal
15:30 UTC+5:45		Report (FIFA); Report (AFC)		Stadium: Dasarath Rangasala Stadium; Attendance: 10,500; Referee: Khamis Al-Marri (Qatar)

== I-League ==
Pos	Team	Pld	W	D	L	GF	GA	GD	Pts	Qualification or relegation
1	Mohun Bagan (C)	20	11	6	3	33	16	+17	39	Qualification for AFC Champions League qualifying play-off
2	Bengaluru	20	10	7	3	35	19	+16	37	Qualification for AFC Cup group stage (Note: Bengaluru FC, as the winner of 2014–15 Federation Cup, qualified for the 2016 AFC Cup)
3	Royal Wahingdoh	20	8	6	6	27	27	0	30	
4	East Bengal	20	8	5	7	30	28	+2	29 (Note: East Bengal ahead on goal difference, head-to-head record being the same; Pune 2–3 East Bengal East Bengal 1–2 Pune)	
5	Pune	20	8	5	7	24	26	−2	29	
6	Mumbai	20	5	9	6	22	27	−5	24 (Note: Mumbal ahead on head-to-head goal difference; Mumbai–Salgaocar 3–0, Salgaocar–Mumbai 3–1)	
7	Salgaocar	20	7	3	10	25	27	−2	24	
8	Sporting Goa	20	5	8	7	22	27	−5	23 (Note: Sporting Goa ahead on head-to-head record; Sporting Goa–Shillong Lajong 1–1, Shillong Lajong–Sporting Goa 1–2)	
9	Shillong Lajong	20	6	5	9	34	29	+5	23	
10	Dempo (R)	20	3	10	7	15	26	−11	19	Relegation to I-League 2nd Division
11	Bharat (Note: Bharat FC were not relegated as they had relegation immunity for two years.)	20	4	6	10	13	28	−15	18	

Source: IndiaFooty.com
Rules for classification: 1) points; 2) head-to-head points; 3) head-to-head goal difference; 4) goal difference; 5) number of goals scored; 6) play-off match.
(C) Champions; (R) Relegated

== Indian Super League ==
Pos	Team	Pld	W	D	L	GF	GA	GD	Pts	Qualification
1	Chennaiyin	14	6	5	3	24	20	+4	23	Advance to ISL Play-offs
2	Goa	14	6	4	4	21	12	+9	22	Advance to ISL Play-offs
3	Atlético de Kolkata (C)	14	4	7	3	16	13	+3	19	Advance to ISL Play-offs
4	Kerala Blasters	14	5	4	5	9	11	−2	19	Advance to ISL Play-offs
5	Delhi Dynamos	14	4	6	4	16	14	+2	18	
6	Pune City	14	4	4	6	12	17	−5	16	
7	Mumbai City	14	4	4	6	12	21	−9	16	
8	NorthEast United	14	3	6	5	11	13	−2	15	

Source: Soccerway
Rules for classification: 1) points; 2) goal difference; 3) number of goals scored
(C) Champions

=== Finals ===
Semi–finals
4	Kerala Blasters	3	1	4
1	Chennaiyin	0	3	3
3	Atlético de Kolkata (pen.)	0	0	0 (4)
2	Goa	0	0	0 (2)

Final
4	Kerala Blasters	0
3	Atlético de Kolkata	1
