= Eric Brown (footballer) =

Liberian footballer (born 1990)

Personal information
- Date of birth: 12 September 1990 (age 36)
- Place of birth: Liberia
- Height: 1.66 m (5 ft 5 in)
- Position: Attacking midfielder

Team information
- Current team: Mumbai FC
- Number: 10

Youth career
- Mumbai

Senior career*
Years	Team	Apps	(Gls)
2011–2013	ONGC	46	(11)
2013–2014	United SC	23	(10)
2014	Pune	22	(6)
2014–2015	United SC	?	(?)
2015–2016	Mumbai FC	10	(1)
2016–2017	United SC		
2017–	Pathachakra AC	8	(5)
- * Club domestic league appearances and goals as of 2 March 2016

Eric Brown (born 12 September 1990) is a Liberian footballer who plays as an attacking midfielder for Mumbai FC in the I-League.

== Career ==
=== ONGC ===
After spending his first professional senior season at Mumbai F.C. Brown signed for ONGC F.C. of the I-League, and made his debut for the club on 26 October 2012 against Prayag United at the Ambedkar Stadium in which he scored the only goal for his team from a free-kick in the 35th minute which led them to a 1–1 draw against the Kolkata club in the I-League.

=== United Sports Club ===
Brown was the top scorer for United SC during the 2013-14 I-League.

=== Pune FC ===
Brown joined up with Pune F.C. for the 2014-15 I-League.

=== Mumbai FC ===
Brown has joined up with Mumbai F.C. for the 2015-16 I-League

== Career statistics ==
=== Club ===
Statistics accurate as of 16 January 2015

Club	Season	League		Federation Cup		Durand Cup		AFC		Total	
Club	Season	Apps	Goals	Apps	Goals	Apps	Goals	Apps	Goals	Apps	Goals
ONGC	2012–13	20	7	0	0	–	–	–	–	20	7
United SC	2013–14	23	10	0	0	–	–	–	–	23	10
Pune	2014–15	0	0	4	0	–	–	–	–	4	10
Career total		43	17	4	0	0	0	0	0	47	17
