= 2014–15 Sporting Clube de Goa season =

2014–15 season of Sporting Clube de Goa

Sporting Goa
2014–15 season
- Chairman: Peter Vaz

The 2014–15 season will be Sporting Goa's 8th season in the I-League and 15th season in existence.

== Durand Cup ==
=== Quarter-finals ===
Team	Pld	W	D	L	GF	GA	GD	Pts
Sporting Goa	2	2	0	0	7	3	+4	6
United	2	1	0	1	4	4	0	3
Air India	2	0	0	2	2	6	−4	0

29 October 2014	Sporting Goa	3 – 2	United	Raia Sports Complex, Raia
15:30 IST	Karpeh 5', 17'; Wolfe 65' (pen.)	Report	Oraon 42'; Sujay Oraon 70'	Referee: Maria Joseph

2 November 2014	Sporting Goa	4 – 1	Air India	Raia Sports Complex, Raia
15:45 IST	Karpeh 15' (pen.); C. Fernandes 28'; Clemente 45+1'; Wolfe 64'	Report	Neil Gaikwad 70'

=== Semi-finals ===
6 November 2014	Sporting Goa	v	Group D Winner	Tilak Maidan Stadium, Vasco

== Transfers ==
Sporting Goa began signing players for the new season as early as April when they signed Tata Football Academy graduate Jarman Jeet Singh.

=== In ===
No.	Position	Player	Signed from	Date	Ref
	DF	(India) Jarman Jeet Singh	(India) Tata Football Academy	19 April 2014	
