= Waheed Adekunle =

Nigerian footballer (born 1986)

Personal information
- Full name: Waheed Owolabi Adekunle
- Date of birth: 1 January 1986 (age 40)
- Place of birth: Nigeria
- Position: Striker

Team information
- Current team: United SC (on loan from George Telegraph)
- Number: 29

Senior career*
Years	Team	Apps	(Gls)
2013	George Telegraph		
2014 (loan)	United	1	(0)
- * Club domestic league appearances and goals as of 19 February 2014

Waheed Owolabi Adekunle (born 1 January 1986) is a Nigerian professional footballer who played as a striker for United S.C. on loan from George Telegraph S.C. in the I-League.

== Career ==
=== United ===
On 14 February 2014, Waheed signed for United S.C. on loan from George Telegraph S.C. He made his debut in the I-League on 19 February 2014 against United S.C. at the Kalyani Stadium in which he started and played till 88th minute before being replaced by Jayanta Sen as United drew the match 1-1.

== Career statistics ==
As of 19 February 2014

Club	Season	League			Federation Cup		Durand Cup		AFC		Total		
Club	Season	Apps	Goals	Apps	Goals	Apps	Goals	Apps	Goals	Apps	Goals		
United	2013-14	1	0	0	0	0	0	-	-	1	0		
United	Career total			1	0	0	0	0	0	0	0	1	0
