= 2014 IFA Shield =

২০১৪ আইএফএ শিল্ড

Tournament details
- Country: India
- Teams: 8

Final positions
- Champions: (India) Mohammedan (6th title)
- Runners-up: (Bangladesh) Sheikh Jamal

Tournament statistics
- Top goal scorer: (Haiti) Sony Norde (4 goals)

The 2014 IFA Shield was the 118th edition of the IFA Shield. The tournament was held from 29 January to 11 February 2014 in Kolkata. That year, the Indian Football Association announced that three foreign clubs to participate in the tournament, S.League club Geylang International FC, South Korean Sun Moon University and Bangladesh Premier League club Sheikh Jamal Dhanmondi Club.

However, on 22 January 2014 it was announced that Shillong Lajong would not participate in this tournament and instead current I-League 2nd Division club United Sikkim would take their place.

== Group stage ==
=== Group A ===
Team	Pld	W	D	L	GF	GA	GD	Pts
(India) East Bengal	3	2	1	0	5	1	+4	7
(India) United	3	2	0	1	4	4	0	6
(South Korea) Sun Moon University	3	0	2	1	2	3	−1	2
(Singapore) Geylang International	3	0	1	2	1	4	−3	1

Source: RSSSF
29 January 2014
15:15 IST

Kingfisher East Bengal	1–1	Sun Moon University
Moga 77'	Report	Kim Dae-han 6'

Barasat Stadium, Barasat

1 February 2014
15:15 IST

East Bengal	2–0	Geylang International
Doungel 72' Chidi 90'	Report

Salt Lake Stadium, Kolkata
1 February 2014
18:15 IST

United	2–1	Sun Moon University
Rafique 41' Martins 86'	Report	Kim Jong-woo 44'

Salt Lake Stadium, Kolkata

4 February 2014
15:15 IST

East Bengal	2–0	United
Ralte 49' Moga 69'	Report

Salt Lake Stadium, Kolkata
4 February 2014
18:15 IST

Geylang International	0–0	Sun Moon University
	Report

Salt Lake Stadium, Kolkata

8 February 2014
18:15 IST

United	2–1	Geylang International
Singh 21' Brown 34'		Fukuda 38'

Salt Lake Stadium, Kolkata

=== Group B ===
Team	Pld	W	D	L	GF	GA	GD	Pts
(Bangladesh) Sheikh Jamal	3	2	0	1	5	3	+2	6
(India) Mohammedan	3	1	2	0	3	2	+1	5
(India) Mohun Bagan	3	1	1	1	1	1	0	4
(India) United Sikkim	3	0	1	2	2	5	−3	1

Source: RSSSF
30 January 2014
18:30 IST

Mohammedan	1–1	United Sikkim
Masih 8'	Report	Somide 10'

Barasat Stadium, Barasat

2 February 2014
15:15 IST

Mohun Bagan	1–0	United Sikkim
Sabeeth 27'	Report

Salt Lake Stadium, Kolkata
2 February 2014
18:15 IST

Mohammedan	2–1	Sheikh Jamal
Biswas 58'; Josimar 85'	Report	Norde 41'

Salt Lake Stadium, Kolkata

5 February 2014
15:15 IST

Mohun Bagan	0–0	Mohammedan
	Report

Salt Lake Stadium, Kolkata
5 February 2014
18:15 IST

United Sikkim	1–3	Sheikh Jamal
Somide 70'	Report	Enselme 5', 82'; Darlington 25'

Salt Lake Stadium, Kolkata

8 February 2014
15:15 IST

Mohun Bagan	0–1	Sheikh Jamal
	Report	Norde 23'

Salt Lake Stadium, Kolkata

== Semi-finals ==
11 February 2014
15:15 IST

East Bengal	0–3	Sheikh Jamal
	Report	Darlington 22'; Norde 37'; Anselme 66'

Salt Lake Stadium, Kolkata
11 February 2014
18:15 IST

Mohammedan	1–0 (a.e.t.)	United
Orji 94'	Report

Salt Lake Stadium, Kolkata

== Third-place match ==
13 February 2014
15:15 IST

East Bengal	1–1 (a.e.t.)	United
Edeh 22' (pen.)	Report	B. Singh 73'
Penalties
Edeh (penalty missed); Lobo (penalty scored); Tluanga (penalty scored); Kumar (penalty scored); N. Singh (penalty scored); Khabra (penalty missed)	4–5	(penalty scored) Martins; (penalty missed) Razaq; (penalty scored) D. Singh; (penalty scored) Biswas; (penalty scored) Sarkar; (penalty scored) Chakraborty

Salt Lake Stadium, Kolkata
Referee: Pranjol Banerjee

== Final ==
15 February 2014
18:15 IST

Sheikh Jamal	1–1 (a.e.t.)	Mohammedan
Norde 28'	Report	Wadoo 45+1'
Penalties
Anselme (penalty scored); Chowdhury (penalty scored); Khan (penalty scored); Amisu (penalty missed); Didarul (penalty missed)	3–4	(penalty scored) Paite; (penalty scored) Maithani; (penalty scored) Chettri; (penalty scored) Wadoo; (penalty missed) Josimar

Salt Lake Stadium, Kolkata
Attendance: 60,000
Referee: Santosh Kumar (Kerala)

== Goalscorers ==
4 Goals

- (Haiti) Sony Norde (Sheikh Jamal)

3 Goals

- (Haiti) Wedson Anselme (Sheikh Jamal)

2 Goals

- (South Sudan) James Moga (East Bengal)
- (Nigeria) Emeka Darlington (Sheikh Jamal)
- (Nigeria) Oluwaunmi Somide (United Sikkim)
- (Nigeria) Chidi Edeh (East Bengal)
- (India) Baldeep Singh (United)

1 Goal

- (India) Seminlen Doungel (East Bengal)
- (India) Lalrindika Ralte (East Bengal)
- (South Korea) Kim Dae-han (Sun Moon University)
- (South Korea) Kim Jong-woo (Sun Moon University)
- (Japan) Kento Fukuda (Geylang International)
- (India) Mohammed Rafique (United)
- (Nigeria) Ranti Martins (United)
- (Liberia) Eric Brown (United)
- (India) Rakesh Masih (Mohammedan)
- (India) Ashim Biswas (Mohammedan)
- (Brazil) Josimar (Mohammedan)
- (India) Chinadorai Sabeeth (Mohun Bagan)
- (Nigeria) Penn Orji (Mohammedan)
- (India) Mehrajuddin Wadoo (Mohammedan)
