= Zakeer Mundampara =

Indian footballer (born 1990)

MP Zakeer
Personal information
- Date of birth: 20 May 1990 (age 36)
- Place of birth: Areekode, Malapuram, Kerala, India
- Position: Midfielder

Youth career
- 2007–09: SBT

Senior career*
| Years | Team | Apps | (Gls) |
| 2009–10 | Chirag United Kerala | 29 | (12) |
| 2010–12 | Churchill Brothers | 17 | (5) |
| 2012–13 | United SC | 3 | (0) |
| 2013–14 | Mohun Bagan | 14 | (1) |
| 2014–15 | Salgaocar | 16 | (0) |
| 2015–2017 | Chennaiyin | 10 | (0) |
| 2016 | → DSK Shivajians (loan) | 0 | (0) |
| 2017 | → Chennai City (loan) | 9 | (0) |
| 2017–2018 | Mumbai City FC | 7 | (0) |
| 2018–2019 | Kerala Blasters FC | 5 | (0) |

International career
| 2011 | India U23 | 1 | (0) |
- * Club domestic league appearances and goals as of 17 December 2018

Zakeer Mundampara is an Indian footballer who last played as a midfielder for Indian Super League club Kerala Blasters FC.

== Early life ==
Zakeer started taking football seriously at the age of 15. He played for Spandanam, Areekode and Areekode Town Team during his early days as a footballer. He then joined Orient High School for studies where he continued playing football. From there he went to Moorkanad Higher Secondary School and then to MES College, Mampad.

== Career ==
=== SBT ===
Zakeer joined State Bank of Travancore (SBT) team in 2007. He proved himself to be a good playmaker with vision on the field.

=== Viva Kerala ===
Viva Kerala acquired Mundampara as a midfielder from SBT in 2009, when they gained promotion to the I-league. He was the backbone of the team, helping them to avoid relegation.

=== Churchill Brothers ===
Zakeer accepted a contract offer from Churchill Brothers SC in 2010. He scored his first career goal against Chirag United on 10 April 2011 helping the team secure a win.

=== Prayag United ===
On 31 May 2012, it was announced that Mundampara signed with Prayag United of the I-League.

=== Mohun Bagan ===
On 6 August 2013, it was announced that Zakeer has signed for Mohun Bagan on a one-year deal. He made his debut for Mohun Bagan in the I-League on 22 September 2013 against Bengaluru FC at the Bangalore Football Stadium in which he played the whole match and earned a yellow card in the 83rd minute as Mohun Bagan drew the match 1-1.

=== Chennaiyin FC ===
In July 2015, Mundampara was drafted to play for Chennaiyin FC in the 2015 Indian Super League.

== International ==
Zakeer made his India U-23 debut on 19 June 2011 against Qatar U23 coming on as a 72nd-minute substitute for Shilton D'Silva.

== Honours ==
Chennaiyin

- Indian Super League: 2015
