= 2013–14 I-League =

7th season of the I-League

I-League
- Season: 2013–14
- Champions: Bengaluru; 1st I-League title 1st Indian title
- Relegated: Mohammedan
- AFC Champions League: Bengaluru
- AFC Cup: Bengaluru; East Bengal
- Matches: 156
- Goals: 402 (2.58 per match)
- Top goalscorer: Cornell Glen; Sunil Chhetri; Darryl Duffy (14 goals each)
- Biggest home win: Mohun Bagan 4–0 United (6 December 2013); Sporting Goa 5–1 Shillong Lajong (14 December 2013); Dempo 4–0 Sporting Goa (8 March 2014); Rangdajied United 4–0 United (9 March 2014)
- Biggest away win: Shillong Lajong 0–4 East Bengal (9 October 2013)
- Highest scoring: Mohammedan 4–5 Shillong Lajong (16 April 2014)
- Longest winning run: 5 games Salgaocar
- Longest unbeaten run: 8 games East Bengal
- Longest losing run: 4 games Salgaocar
- Highest attendance: 80,000; Mohun Bagan 0–1 East Bengal (24 November 2013)
- Average attendance: 5,618

The 2013–14 I-League (known as the Airtel I-League for sponsorship reasons) was the seventh season of the I-League, the top-tier Indian professional league for football clubs, since its establishment in 2007. The season began on 21 September 2013, and ended on 28 April 2014.

Churchill Brothers were the defending champions, having won their second I-League title in the previous season.

On 21 April 2014, Bengaluru were crowned champions with one game remaining, winning their first ever I-League title by defeating Dempo 2–4 at Fatorda Stadium. Bengaluru FC also created history by becoming the first team ever to win the I-League title in its debut season. On 28 April 2014, Mohammedan were relegated from the I-League when Churchill Brothers defeated Salgaocar 2–1, and hence survived relegation. Churchill Brothers also avoided being the first defending champions to be relegated.

During the season, Maria Rebello became the first woman referee internationally to officiate in a country's premier league match when she officiated in Pune vs Shillong Lajong on 8 March 2014.

== Teams ==
A total of 13 teams are currently registered to start the new season. Ten clubs from the previous campaign, two promoted sides from the 2013 I-League 2nd Division and one new expansion team.

Rangdajied United as champions and Mohammedan as runners-up secured direct promotion from the 2nd Division.

United Sikkim and Air India were relegated, although Air India would not have been given a licence to compete in this edition after failing to fulfill the AIFF criteria. This same fate happened to ONGC who have also been left out of the coming season.

Mumbai Tigers was accepted into the league on 27 May 2013 but later withdrew citing unavoidable circumstances with only 20 days left into the start of the new season.

Bengaluru was also accepted into the league and is based in Bangalore. One other consortium from Kerala, whose leading company is Eagles FC, also expressed interest in joining the league. It was also announced in late May that English club Queens Park Rangers also expressed interest but look to be prepared to enter for the 2014–15 season.

On 29 August 2013, the AIFF decided to shut down Pailan Arrows and withdraw them from the coming season. The league committee also announced in May 2013 to use a Conference Model, the Eastern Conference and Western Conference. The top-four from each Conference would advance to play the final round. But this was later dropped.

On 20 September 2013, it was announced that the largest cellular service provider in India, Airtel, will be the title sponsor of I-League for the 2013–14 season.

=== Venues and locations ===
Locations of teams in the 2013–14 I-League

Team	Location	Stadium	Capacity
Bengaluru	Bangalore, Karnataka	Bangalore Football Stadium	8,400
Churchill Brothers	Salcette, Goa	Fatorda Stadium	24,000
Dempo	Panjim, Goa	Fatorda Stadium	24,000
East Bengal	Kolkata, West Bengal	Kalyani Stadium	10,000
Mohammedan	Kolkata, West Bengal	Salt Lake Stadium	120,000
Mohun Bagan	Kolkata, West Bengal	Salt Lake Stadium	120,000
Mumbai	Mumbai, Maharashtra	Balewadi Sports Complex	22,000
Pune	Pune, Maharashtra	Balewadi Sports Complex	22,000
Rangdajied United	Shillong, Meghalaya	Nehru Stadium	30,000
Salgaocar	Vasco da Gama, Goa	Tilak Maidan Stadium	16,000
Shillong Lajong	Shillong, Meghalaya	Nehru Stadium	30,000
Sporting Goa	Panjim, Goa	Duler Stadium	6,000
United	Kolkata, West Bengal	Kalyani Stadium	10,000

=== Personnel and kits ===
Team	Manager	Captain	Shirt sponsor	Kit sponsor
Bengaluru	(England) Ashley Westwood	(India) Sunil Chhetri	JSW	none
Churchill Brothers	(India) Mariano Dias	(India) Lenny Rodrigues	Churchill	none
Dempo	(Australia) Arthur Papas	(India) Clifford Miranda	Dempo	Nike
East Bengal	(India) Armando Colaco	(India) Mehtab Hussain	Kingfisher and SRMB TMT^{1}	Shiv-Naresh
Mohammedan	(India) Sanjoy Sen	(India) R Dhanarajan	EMTA Group^{2}	none
Mohun Bagan	(Morocco) Karim Bencherifa	(Nigeria) Odafe Okolie	McDowell's No.1	Fila
Mumbai	(India) Khalid Jamil	(Afghanistan) Zohib Amiri	TEN HD	Seven
Pune	(Netherlands) Mike Snoei	(India) Anas Edathodika	Peninsula	Adidas
Rangdajied United	(India) Herring Shangpliang	(India) Poibang Pohshna	none	Diadora
Salgaocar	(India) Derrick Pereira	(India) Francis Fernandes	Salgaocar	none
Shillong Lajong	(India) Thangboi Singto	(North Korea) Minchol Son	Aircel	Adidas
Sporting Goa	(Spain) Óscar Bruzón	(India) Matthew Gonsalves	Models	none
United	(India) Ananta Kumar Ghosh	(India) Deepak Mondal	T.H.P.L.	none

1. On the back of shirt.
2. On the sleeves.

=== Managerial changes ===
Team	Outgoing manager	Manner of departure	Date of vacancy	Position in table	Incoming manager	Date of appointment
Bengaluru	Expansion team			Pre-season	(England) Ashley Westwood	2 July 2013
Dempo	(India) Armando Colaco	End of Contract	31 May 2013	Pre-season	(Australia) Arthur Papas	1 June 2013
East Bengal	(England) Trevor Morgan	Mutual Agreement	12 May 2013	Pre-season	(Brazil) Marcos Falopa	12 June 2013
Mohammedan	(India) Sanjoy Sen	Resigned	10 May 2013	Pre-season	(Nigeria) Abdul Aziz Moshood	10 June 2013
Pune	(India) Derrick Pereira	End of Contract	12 May 2013	Pre-season	(Netherlands) Mike Snoei	12 May 2013
Rangdajied United	None^{1}			Pre-season	(India) Santosh Kashyap	6 June 2013
Salgaocar	(England) Dave Booth	End of Contract	12 May 2013	Pre-season	(India) Derrick Pereira	12 May 2013
East Bengal	(Brazil) Marcos Falopa	Resigned	13 November 2013	10th (5 games in)	(India) Armando Colaco	20 November 2013
Mohammedan	(Nigeria) Abdul Aziz Moshood	Sacked	17 December 2013	11th (13 games in)	(India) Sanjoy Sen	17 December 2013
United	(Netherlands) Eelco Schattorie	Resigned	27 January 2014	9th (15 games in)	(India) Ananta Kumar Ghosh	15 February 2014
Rangdajied United	(India) Santosh Kashyap	Sacked	21 February 2014	13th	(India) Herring Shangpliang	1 March 2014

1. Rangdajied United, during the 2013 I-League 2nd Division, were under the control of their General Secretary, Karsing Kurbah.

=== Foreign players ===
Restricting the number of foreign players strictly to four per team, including a slot for a player from AFC countries. A team could use four foreign players on the field during each game including at least one player from the AFC country.

Club	Player 1	Player 2	Player 3	AFC Player	Former Players^{1}
Bengaluru	(England) John Johnson	(Kenya) Curtis Osano	(Liberia) Johnny Menyongar	(Australia) Sean Rooney	
Churchill Brothers	(Costa Rica) Cristian Lagos	(Egypt) Abdelhamid Shabana	(Trinidad and Tobago) Anthony Wolfe	(Australia) Daniell Zeleny	(Gabon) Henri Antchouet (Portugal) Amoreirinha (Portugal) Hugo Machado (Syria) Ahmad Al Kaddour (Syria) Naser Al Sebai (Syria) Yasser Shahen
Dempo	(Australia) Simon Colosimo	(Australia) Tolgay Ozbey	(Brazil) Beto	(Afghanistan) Zohib Islam Amiri	(Republic of Ireland) Billy Mehmet (Japan) Shinnosuke Honda
East Bengal	(Nigeria) Chidi Edeh	(Nigeria) Uga Okpara	(South Sudan) James Moga	(Japan) Ryuji Sueoka	
Mohammedan	(Brazil) Josimar	(Brazil) Luciano Sabrosa	(Nigeria) Penn Orji	(Japan) Taro Hasegawa	(Australia) Tolgay Ozbey
Mohun Bagan	(Nigeria) Echezona Anyichie	(Nigeria) Christopher Chizoba	(Nigeria) Odafe Okolie	(Japan) Katsumi Yusa	(Kenya) Harrison Muranda
Mumbai	(Ghana) Yusif Yakubu	(Nigeria) Henry Ezeh	(Nigeria) Ebi Sukore	(Afghanistan) Ahmad Hatifi	(Afghanistan) Sandjar Ahmadi (Afghanistan) Zohib Islam Amiri
Pune	(England) Calum Angus	(Ivory Coast) Pierre Douhou	(Netherlands) Riga Mustapha	(Australia) Mirjan Pavlović	(Australia) James Meyer (Spain) Raul Fabiani
Rangdajied United	(Nigeria) Ranti Martins	(North Korea) Kim Song-Yong	(Senegal) Lamine Tamba	(Japan) Yohei Iwasaki	(Brazil) Edmar Figueira
Salgaocar	(Nigeria) Dudu Omagbemi	(Nigeria) Chika Wali	(Scotland) Darryl Duffy	(Australia) Matthew Foschini	(France) Claude Gnakpa
Shillong Lajong	(Brazil) Uilliams	(Japan) Taisuke Matsugae	(Trinidad and Tobago) Cornell Glen	(North Korea) Minchol Son	
Sporting Goa	(Nigeria) Martins Ekwueme	(Nigeria) Ogba Kalu Nnanna	(Spain) Gonzalo Hinojal	(Australia) Boima Karpeh	(Spain) Arturo Navarro
United	(Liberia) Eric Brown	(Nigeria) Waheed Adekunle	(Nigeria) Bello Razaq	(Syria) Hasan Al Moustafa	(Nigeria) Ranti Martins

- ^1 Foreign players who left their clubs midway or after first half of the season.

== League table ==
Pos	Team	Pld	W	D	L	GF	GA	GD	Pts	Qualification or relegation
1	Bengaluru (C)	24	14	5	5	42	28	+14	47	Qualification for 2015 AFC Champions League qualifying play-off
2	East Bengal	24	12	7	5	39	23	+16	43	Qualification for 2015 AFC Cup group stage
3	Salgaocar	24	11	6	7	36	25	+11	39	
4	Dempo	24	9	8	7	31	25	+6	35	
5	Sporting Goa	24	9	7	8	34	34	0	34	
6	Shillong Lajong	24	8	9	7	35	37	−2	33	
7	Pune	24	7	8	9	28	32	−4	29	
8	Mohun Bagan	24	6	10	8	23	24	−1	28	
9	Mumbai	24	5	13	6	31	32	−1	28	
10	United (R)	24	5	11	8	22	32	−10	26	Excluded (Note: United, Rangdajied United and Churchill Brothers were barred from I-League they failed to meet Asian Football Confederation's licensing criteria.)
11	Churchill Brothers (R)	24	6	7	11	25	37	−12	25	Excluded
12	Rangdajied United (R)	24	6	7	11	29	38	−9	25	Excluded
13	Mohammedan (R)	24	6	6	12	27	35	−8	24	Relegation to 2015 I-League 2nd Division

Source: IndiaFooty.com
Rules for classification: 1) points; 2) head-to-head points; 3) goal difference; 4) number of goals scored; 5) taking lots
(C) Champions; (R) Relegated

== Results ==
Home \ Away	BFC	CB	DEM	EB	MSC	MB	MUM	PFC	RUFC	SFC	SLFC	SCG	USC
Bengaluru		3–0	3–1	0–2	2–1	1–1	1–1	1–1	3–0	2–1	2–1	0–0	1–0
Churchill Brothers	1–3		1–4	1–0	3–1	0–0	0–2	3–2	1–0	0–1	0–1	3–2	0–2
Dempo	2–4	1–0		1–0	1–0	0–0	1–1	1–1	2–0	0–2	0–3	4–0	1–2
East Bengal	2–0	0–0	1–3		2–1	1–1	2–2	3–1	3–1	2–3	0–0	2–1	1–1
Mohammedan	2–3	0–0	0–0	1–3		0–0	1–0	1–3	2–1	0–1	4–5	3–1	0–0
Mohun Bagan	0–2	2–2	0–1	0–1	0–0		1–1	3–1	0–2	2–1	2–1	1–2	4–0
Mumbai	2–2	4–2	1–1	3–2	1–2	0–1		0–0	1–1	1–3	2–3	1–1	1–1
Pune	1–0	1–0	0–3	1–2	2–0	2–0	1–2		1–0	1–2	2–2	1–1	1–1
Rangdajied United	3–2	1–1	2–2	1–2	0–3	3–1	1–1	3–2		2–2	0–0	1–2	4–0
Salgaocar	1–2	1–2	1–1	0–0	3–0	1–0	2–0	1–1	1–2		3–1	0–1	0–0
Shillong Lajong	3–0	2–2	2–1	0–4	2–1	1–1	1–2	0–0	1–1	2–1		0–1	1–1
Sporting Goa	1–2	1–1	1–0	1–1	1–3	1–3	1–1	2–0	3–0	3–3	5–1		1–0
United	1–3	3–2	0–0	0–3	1–1	0–0	1–1	1–2	2–0	0–2	2–2	3–1	

Source: Results
Legend: Blue = home team win; Yellow = draw; Red = away team win.

== Season statistics ==
As of 28 April 2014

=== Top scorers ===
Rank	Player	Team	Goals
1	(India) Sunil Chhetri	Bengaluru	14
1	(Scotland) Darryl Duffy	Salgaocar	14
1	(Trinidad and Tobago) Cornell Glen	Shillong Lajong	14
4	(Brazil) Josimar	Mohammedan	13
5	(Nigeria) Ranti Martins	Rangdajied United	12
6	(Australia) Boima Karpeh	Sporting Goa	11
7	(Liberia) Eric Brown	United	10
7	(Australia) Sean Rooney	Bengaluru	10
7	(India) Balwant Singh	Churchill Brothers	10

=== Top Indian Scorers ===
Rank	Player	Team	Goals
1	(India) Sunil Chhetri	Bengaluru	14
2	(India) Balwant Singh	Churchill Brothers	10
3	(India) Gilbert Oliveira	Salgaocar	6
4	(India) Boithang Haokip	Shillong Lajong	5
4	(India) T Lalnunpuia	Rangdajied United	5
4	(India) Jeje Lalpekhlua	Dempo	5
4	(India) Robin Singh	Bengaluru	5

=== Hat-tricks ===
Player	Club	Against	Result	Date
(Nigeria) Kalu Ogba	Sporting Goa	Shillong Lajong	5—1	14 December 2013
(Australia) Tolgay Özbey ^{4}	Dempo	Churchill Brothers	4—1	28 March 2014
(Ghana) Yusif Yakubu	Mumbai	Churchill Brothers	4—2	13 April 2014
(Trinidad and Tobago) Cornell Glen	Shillong Lajong	Mohammedan	5—4	16 April 2014

^{4} Player scored 4 goals

=== Disciplinary ===
- Most red cards (2)
  - Echezona Anyichie (Mohun Bagan)
  - Amrinder Singh (Pune)
- Most yellow cards (7)
  - Eric Brown (United SC)
  - Yohei Iwasaki (Rangdajied United)
  - Luciano Sabrosa (Mohammedan)
  - Lamine Tamba (Rangdajied United)
- Worst disciplinary record (2 red cards & 5 yellow cards)
  - Echezona Anyichie (Mohun Bagan)

=== Fair play ===
The Fair Play qualities of the participating teams and which are pertinent to the spectators will be evaluated using the FIFA Fair Play evaluation form. Salgaocar led the Fair Play rankings at the end of the season.

Rank	Team	Games	Total Points
1	Salgaocar	24	1904.643
2	United	24	1850.357
3	Rangdajied United	24	1841.429
4	Mumbai	24	1839.286
5	Dempo	24	1824.286
6	Bengaluru	24	1816.571
7	East Bengal	24	1813.514
8	Shillong Lajong	24	1797.143
9	Mohun Bagan	24	1788.214
10	Pune	24	1760.357
11	Mohammedan	24	1744.286
12	Sporting Goa	24	1719.286
13	Churchill Brothers	24	1672.071

=== Average attendance ===
Average attendance at the various clubs were as follows:

Rank	Team	Average attendance
1	Mohun Bagan	17,068
2	Shillong Lajong	11,308
3	East Bengal	8,667
4	Rangdajied United	7,687
5	Mohammedan	7,083
6	Bengaluru	7,038
7	Pune	2,586
8	Dempo	2,542
9	Churchill Brothers	2,450
10	Salgaocar	2,421
11	United	2,250
12	Sporting Goa	1,608
13	Mumbai	321
	League Average	5618

== Awards ==
=== AIFF Awards ===
All India Football Federation awarded the following awards for the I-League season, voted by all the captains and the coaches of all the participating clubs.

- Best player of I-League: Sunil Chhetri (Bengaluru)
- Best goalkeeper of I-League: Karanjit Singh (Salgaocar)
- Best defender of I-League: John Johnson (Bengaluru)
- Best midfielder of I-League: Douhou Pierre (Pune)
- Best forward of I-League: Sunil Chhetri (Bengaluru)
- Best referee of I-League: Pratap Singh
- Best assistant referee of I-League: Sapan Kennedy

=== FPAI Awards ===
Football Player's Association of India awarded the following award for the season

- Indian player of the year : (India) Balwant Singh
- Coach of the season : (England) Ashley Westwood
- Young player of the season : (India) Alwyn George
- Foreign player of the season : (Scotland) Daryl Duffy
- Fans player of the season : (India) Boithang Haokip

== Number of teams by state ==
State	No. of teams	Teams	City
West Bengal	4	East Bengal	Kolkata
West Bengal	4	Mohammedan	Kolkata
West Bengal	4	Mohun Bagan	Kolkata
West Bengal	4	United	Kolkata
Goa	4	Dempo	Panaji
Goa	4	Sporting Goa	Panaji
Goa	4	Churchill Brothers	Salcette
Goa	4	Salgaocar	Vasco da Gama
Meghalaya	2	Rangdajied United	Shillong
Meghalaya	2	Shillong Lajong	Shillong
Maharashtra	2	Mumbai	Mumbai
Maharashtra	2	Pune	Pune
Karnataka	1	Bengaluru	Bangalore
