= Ananta Kumar Ghosh =

Indian football coach

Personal information
- Full name: Ananta Kumar Ghosh
- Date of birth: 4 November 1954 (age 71)
- Place of birth: Kolkata, West Bengal

Managerial career
- Years: Team
- 2014: United
- 2015–2016: Mohammedan

Ananta Kumar Ghosh (Bengali: অনন্ত কুমার ঘোষ; born 4 November 1954) is an Indian football coach who last managed Mohammedan Sporting.

== Coaching career ==
Born in Kolkata, West Bengal, Ghosh started his coaching career in football in the 1980s when he gained his Master of Sports from the National Institute of Sports in Patiala. He then earned his AFC "B" License in 1998 before earning his AFC "A" License in 2000. In 2005, while heading the Sports Authority of India coaching association, Ghosh blamed the lack of coordination between the government and sports bodies for why football in India is lacking behind the rest of the world.

In 2012, after sacking head coach Pakir Ali, Chirag United Club Kerala announced that Ghosh would join the team later in the season as a coach but for some reason that move never materialized.

=== United ===
On 15 February 2014, it was announced that Ghosh had signed with United S.C. of the I-League for the remainder of the season as the head coach following the resignation of Eelco Schattorie.

=== Mohammedan ===
After his stint with United, Ghosh signed on as the head coach of Mohammedan for their I-League 2nd Division campaign.

== Statistics ==
As of 28 November 2014.

Team	From	To	Record				
Team	From	To	G	W	D	L	Win %
(India) United	15 February 2014	28 April 2014	9	1	5	3	11.11
(India) Mohammedan	28 November 2014	Present	0	0	0	0	—
Total			9	1	5	3	11.11
