= Kim Song-yong =

North Korean association football player (born 1987)

Kim Song-yong 김성용 金成勇 キム ソンヨン
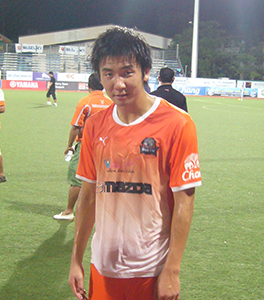
- Kim with Nakhon Ratchasima in 2013

Personal information
- Full name: Kim Song-yong (North Korea); Kimu Sonyon (Japan)
- Date of birth: 26 February 1987 (age 39)
- Place of birth: Tokyo, Japan
- Height: 1.86 m (6 ft 1 in)
- Position: Striker

Youth career
- 2005–2008: Korea University

Senior career*
Years	Team	Apps	(Gls)
2009–2011	Kyoto Sanga FC	33	(4)
2012	Thespa Kusatsu	39	(3)
2013	Nakhon Ratchasima	27	(11)
2013–2014	Rangdajied United	13	(4)
2014–2015	Royal Wahingdoh	19	(5)
2015–2016	Bengaluru FC	10	(4)
2016–2017	DSK Shivajians	13	(4)

International career^{‡}
2007	North Korea U23		
2010	North Korea	3	(1)
Medal record
Men's football
Representing North Korea
AFC Challenge Cup
Gold medal – first place	2010 Sri Lanka
- * Club domestic league appearances and goals as of 19:53, 10 May 2017 (UTC) ‡ National team caps and goals as of 24 April 2010

- Kim Song-yong
- Hangul: 김성용
- Hanja: 金成勇
- RR: Gim Seongyong
- MR: Kim Sŏngyong

Kim Song-yong, also known as Kimu Sonyon (キム ソンヨン; Korean: 김성용; Hanja: 金成勇; born February 26, 1987) is a former professional footballer who played as a striker. Born in Japan, he represented the North Korea at international level.

== Club career ==
Kim made his professional debut for Kyoto Sanga FC on 4 April 2009, coming on as a late substitute in a J1 League match against the Kashima Antlers. He scored his first professional goal against Albirex Niigata on 22 August 2009, ensuring his club emerged as the winners of the match. On 16 January 2013, it was announced that Kim Seng-Yong would be signing with Nakhon Ratchasima of Thailand. On 25 November 2013, Kim signed for I-league debutant Rangdajied United for the remainder of the season. Kim signed for Royal Wahingdoh for the 2014-15 I-League season, where he appeared 19 times and scored 5 times, helping his side finish a remarkable 3rd in the league.

=== Bengaluru FC ===
On 3 June 2015, Kim signed for Bengaluru FC on a 1-year deal.

On 24 January Kim scored his first goal for Bengaluru by scoring a brace against Shillong Lajong.

=== DSK Shivajians ===
In August 2016, Kim signed for another Pune based franchise club DSK Shivajians for a one-year deal. He scored four goals in thirteen appearances as the team finished on seventh position.

== International career ==
Kim was named as one of the North Korean squad for the 2010 AFC Challenge Cup. He made a full international debut for North Korea on February 19, 2010, in the 2010 AFC Challenge Cup against Kyrgyzstan at Sugathadasa Stadium in Colombo. He also played in a friendly match against South Africa in April 2010, prior to the 2010 FIFA World Cup.

== Personal life ==
Born and raised in Japan, it was his family connections and pride that made up his mind to choose North Korea, after his ancestors, like many during the time of World War II, chose to stay behind in Japan following the war and came to be known as Zainichi Korean. His father, Kim Kwang-Ho, was the first Zainichi Korean footballer to be called up for the senior Korea DPR national football team.

== Honours ==
North Korea

- AFC Challenge Cup: 2010
