= Karim Bencherifa =

Moroccan coach and former footballer

Personal information
- Date of birth: 15 February 1968 (age 58)
- Place of birth: Rabat, Morocco
- Position: Midfielder

Team information
- Current team: Malappuram FC (head coach)

Youth career
- 1984–1987: Safi

Senior career*
Years	Team	Apps	(Gls)
1987–1989	ASMF Rabat		
1990–1992	Stade Marocain		
1992–1993	3COM Rabat		

Managerial career
- 1994–1995: AST Rabat
- 1996–1997: USP Rabat
- 1997–1998: Morocco Women
- 1998–1999: Youssoufia FC
- 1999–2000: SA Salé
- 2000–2002: Floriana
- 2003–2004: Brunei
- 2004–2005: Tanjong Pagar United
- 2005–2006: Woodlands Wellington
- 2006–2007: Churchill Brothers
- 2008–2010: Mohun Bagan
- 2010–2011: Salgaocar
- 2012–2014: Mohun Bagan
- 2014–2015: Pune
- 2015: Warriors FC
- 2017–2019: Morocco U23 (assistant)
- 2020: Mouloudia Oujda (assistant)
- 2021: Hafia FC
- 2022–2023: IZK Khemisset
- 2023–2026: Singapore Women
- * Club domestic league appearances and goals

Karim Bencherifa (born 15 February 1968) is a Moroccan football manager and former player.

== I-League coaching record ==
As of April 2014

Team	From	To	Record				
Team	From	To	G	W	D	L	Win %
Mohun Bagan	1 July 2008	4 February 2010	35	19	6	10	54.29
Salgaocar	1 July 2010	19 October 2012	54	30	11	13	55.56
Mohun Bagan	19 October 2012	29 April 2014	48	17	18	13	35.42
Total			137	66	35	36	48.18

== Honours ==
=== As manager ===
Salgaocar

- I-League: 2010–11
- Federation Cup: 2011

Mohun Bagan

- Calcutta Football League: 2007–08

Individual

- FPAI Syed Abdul Rahim Award: 2010–11
