= 2015–16 East Bengal FC season =

Indian football club season

East Bengal
2015–16 season
- President: Dr Pranab Dasgupta
- Head-Coach: (India) Biswajit Bhattacharya (until 11 April 2016) (England) Trevor Morgan (from 13 April 2016)
- Stadium: Salt Lake Stadium; Kalyani Stadium; East Bengal Ground
- I-League: 3rd
- Calcutta Football League: Champions
- Federation Cup: Quarter-Finals
- Sheikh Kamal Trophy: Runners-up
- Top goalscorer: League: Ranti Martins (12); All: Ranti Martins (17)
- Highest home attendance: 28742
- Lowest home attendance: 11831
- Average home league attendance: 24962
Home kit colours	Away kit colours	Third kit colours

The 2015–16 season is East Bengal FC's 96th season in existence. The club had won the Calcutta Football League this season and became the runners of 2015 Sheikh Kamal International Club Cup.

== Pre-Season Overview ==
The club signed Do Dong-hyun, a South Korean attacking mid-fielder to support the striking part. With the arrival of veteran defender Bello Razaq from Mohun Bagan, the team became stronger and the Red and Gold Brigade are hoping to seal the CFL championship and set another hexa record. With the help of recent performances, The Club clinched to the 74th spot in the recent AFC Club Ranking, the highest among all Indian football clubs.

== Season Overview ==
=== August ===
The club started their Calcutta Football League (CFL) campaign on 8 August by beating SVF Tollygunge Agragami FC by 1–0. In the next match, against Aryan F.C., the club managed a draw, the only draw of this CFL campaign. Then they went on winning all the matches against Bengal Nagpur Railway, Army XI, Mohammedan S.C., Police AC and Sports Authority of India.

=== September ===
Maintaining their winning streak of August, East Bengal started their September by beating Kalighat Milan Sangha F.C. by 4–3. This fixture was their toughest in this campaign as at a time, the team was trailing by 0-2 and then they managed to win it.
The next fixture of the club was a prestigious Kolkata Derby against their arch rivals Mohun Bagan in which the team managed an easy 4–0 win with two stunning free kicks by Do Dong-hyun, the top scorer of the club, one of which came in just after 82 seconds from the kick off. This win sealed their league victory and their 118th win against their arch rivals. Moreover, it was the club's 6th consecutive CFL championship which is itself a record and they hold a similar 6 consecutive CFL League wins between the period 1970–75.
The last fixture was against Southern Samity on 10 September. East Bengal with their reserved squad managed to win it and became the unbeatable champions of this CFL. Do Dong-hyun became the top scorer of both the club and the CFL.

=== October ===
The club went to play an international tournament in Bangladesh named 2015 Sheikh Kamal International Club Cup. The team draw set East Bengal in Group B on the fixture of this tour. Due to the absence of almost all the main and first team players of the club (all out on loan in different clubs of Indian Super League), the junior and reserve bench players had taken part in it. The club brought Orok Essien and Subodh Kumar on loan for the tournament. East Bengal started off well by defeating Bangladesh club Abahani Limited (Chittagong) by 2–1 on 21st Oct 2015. Young Prohlad scored on the match along with Mohammed Rafique. After that the most important player of midfield, Do Dong-hyun, had a knee injury which couldn't let him play for the rest of the tour. The club kept on its winning streak by defeating the current best club of Pakistan K-Electric F.C. by a comfortable margin of 3–1. Then the club had its first draw of the tournament which was against Abahani Limited (Dhaka). Then the club went into the semis where they defeated (on 28th oct 2015) Mohammedan Sporting Club (Dhaka) by 3–0 to enter into the final. Ranti Martins scored a couple on the semis. On 30th Oct 2015, East Bengal FC played the final against Abahani Limited (Chittagong) once again after the very first match. But the young brigade could not seal the victory at the end in spite of taking a lead on the 9th minute by the goal scored by Avinabo Bag. This time East Bengal lost to the Bangladeshi club by 1–3. The brilliant performance of the junior players throughout the tournament came to an end with the defeat in final match. But the fight of the junior brigade were appreciated whole heartedly by the supporters of the club.

== Transfers ==
=== In ===
No.	Pos.	Name	Signed from	Month	Ref.
21	MF	(South Korea) Do Dong-hyun	Free Agent	N/A	
6	DF	(Nigeria) Bello Razaq	(India) Mohun Bagan	June	
43	FW	(Nigeria) Orok Essien (on loan)		October	
	MF	(India) Subodh Kumar (on loan)	(India) Tollygunge Agragami	October	

=== Out ===
Pos.	Name	Sold to	Month	Ref.
DF	(India) Safar Sardar	(India) Mohun Bagan	N/A	
MF	(India) Raju Gaikwad	(India) Mohun Bagan	N/A	

== Kit ==
Supplier: Shiv Naresh / Sponsors: Kingfisher Premium, Peerless

Home kit	Away kit	Third Kit

== Technical Staff ==
Position	Name
Chief coach	(India) Biswajit Bhattacharya
Assistant coach	(India) Debjit Ghosh
Goalkeeping coach	(India) Sanjay Majhi
Defence Coach	(Kenya) Sammy Omollo
Physiotherapist	(India) Rajesh Basak
Club Doctor	(India) Dr. Santiranjan Dasgupta
Team Manager	(India) Manish Banerjee
Team Media Officer	(India) Gautam Roy

== Competitions ==
=== Overall ===
Competition	First match	Last match	Final position
Calcutta Football League	8 August 2015	10 September 2015	Champions
Sheikh Kamal Trophy	21 October 2015	30 October 2015	Runners-up
I-League	10 January 2016	24 April 2016	3rd
Federation Cup	1 May 2017	4 May 2017	Quarter Finals

=== Overview ===
Competition	Record							
Competition	Pld	W	D	L	GF	GA	GD	Win %
Calcutta Football League	10	9	1	0	29	9	+20	90.00
Sheikh Kamal International Club Cup	5	3	1	1	9	5	+4	60.00
I-League	16	7	4	5	22	18	+4	43.75
Federation Cup	2	0	1	1	3	4	−1	0.00
Total	33	19	7	7	63	36	+27	57.58

Last updated: 31 May 2016
Source: Competitions

=== Calcutta Football League ===
==== Table ====
2015-16 Calcutta Premier Division

==== Fixtures & results ====
Win Draw Loss

8 August 2015 1	East Bengal	1–0	Tollygunge Agragami	Kolkata
14:00 IST	Harmanjot Khabra 79'	Report		Stadium: East Bengal Ground; Referee: Pranjal Banerjee; Man of the Match: Do Dong-hyun (East Bengal)

11 August 2015 2	East Bengal	0–0	Aryan	Kolkata
14:00 IST		Report		Stadium: East Bengal Ground; Referee: Prabir Dhar; Man of the Match: Priyant Singh (Aryan)

14 August 2015 3	East Bengal	6–0	Bengal Nagpur Railway	Kolkata
14:00 IST	Rafique 24'; Bello Razaq 27'; Do Dong-hyun 53', 83', 90+2'; Jiten Murmu 90+1'	Report		Stadium: East Bengal Ground; Referee: Animesh Biswas; Man of the Match: Do Dong-hyun (East Bengal)

19 August 2015 4	East Bengal	3–2	Army XI	Kolkata
14:00 IST	Do Dong-hyun 58', 69'; Saumik Dey 76'	Report	L'mawaya 16'; P Jain 34'	Stadium: East Bengal Ground; Referee: Ajit Dutta; Man of the Match: Do Dong-hyun (East Bengal)

23 August 2015 5	East Bengal	2–1	Mohammedan Sporting	Kolkata
14:00 IST	Do Dong-hyun 66', 73'	Report	Kareem Omolaja 90+5'	Stadium: Barasat Stadium; Referee: Uttam Sarkar; Man of the Match: Do Dong-hyun (East Bengal)

27 August 2015 6	East Bengal	4–1	Police A.C.	Kolkata
14:00 IST	Rafique 28'; Harmanjot Khabra 29'; Do Dong-hyun 62'; Bikash Jairu 70'	Report	Ainish 45'	Stadium: Barasat Stadium; Referee: Tanmoy Dhar; Man of the Match: Rafique (East Bengal)

30 August 2015 7	East Bengal	3–1	SAI Darjeeling	Kolkata
14:00 IST	Rahul Bheke 4'; Mehtab Hossain 52'; Do Dong-hyun 53'	Report	Asiruddin 48'	Stadium: Barasat Stadium; Referee: Pranjal Banerjee; Man of the Match: Mehtab Hossain (East Bengal)

2 September 2015 8	East Bengal	4–3	Kalighat MS	Kolkata
14:00 IST	Ranti Martins 48'; Rahul Bheke 61'; Do Dong-hyun 69'; Abhinas Ruidas 89'	Report	Cristopher 2', 26'; Kallol 75'	Stadium: Barasat Stadium; Referee: Animesh Biswas; Man of the Match: Abhinas Ruidas (East Bengal)

6 September 2015 9^{(KD)}	East Bengal	4–0	Mohun Bagan	Kolkata
14:30 IST	Do Dong-hyun 2', 37'; Mehtab Hossain (yellow card) 48'; Robert Lalthlamuana (yellow card) 52'; Rafique 81'; Rahul Bheke 90+3'	Report	Dudu Omagbemi (yellow card) 19' (yellow-red card) 50'; Sanjay Balmuchu (yellow card) 35'; Lalkamal Bhowmick (yellow card) 36' (yellow-red card) 90+3'	Stadium: Salt Lake Stadium; Referee: Ranjit Bakshi; Man of the Match: Do Dong-hyun (East Bengal)

10 September 2015 10	East Bengal	2–1	Southern Samity	Kolkata
14:00 IST	Prohlad Roy 37'; Rafique 69'	Report	Khaidem Vicky Meitei 47'	Stadium: Barasat Stadium; Referee: Tanmoy Dhar; Man of the Match: Rafique (East Bengal)

=== Sheikh Kamal International Club Cup ===
==== Group B ====
Pos	Team	Pld	W	D	L	GF	GA	GD	Pts	Qualification
1	(India) East Bengal	3	2	1	0	5	2	+3	7	Advance to Semi-finals
2	(Bangladesh) Chittagong Abahani (H)	3	2	0	1	6	4	+2	6	Advance to Semi-finals
3	(Bangladesh) Dhaka Abahani	3	1	1	1	3	3	0	4	
4	(Pakistan) K-Electric	3	0	0	3	5	10	−5	0	

Source: GSA
(H) Hosts

=== Bracket ===
Semi-finals
A1	(Afghanistan) De Spin Ghar Bazan	1
B2	(Bangladesh) Chittagong Abahani	3
B1	(India) East Bengal	3
A2	(Bangladesh) Mohammedan Dhaka	0

Final
B2	(Bangladesh) Chittagong Abahani	3
B1	(India) East Bengal	1

==== Fixtures & results ====
Win Draw Loss

20 October 2015 Group Stage	Chittagong Abahani	1–2	East Bengal	Chittagong
19:30 BST	Bello Razaq 78' (o.g.)		Mohammed Rafique 32'; Prohlad Roy 72'	Stadium: M. A. Aziz Stadium; Attendance: 12,000

22 October 2015 Group Stage	East Bengal	3–1	K-Electric	Chittagong
16:30 BST	Orok Essien 15'; Mohammed Rafique 25'; Ranti Martins 49'	Report	Muhammad Rasool 84'	Stadium: M. A. Aziz Stadium; Attendance: 4,000

24 October 2015 Group Stage	Dhaka Abahani	0–0	East Bengal	Chittagong
19:30 BST				Stadium: M. A. Aziz Stadium; Attendance: 18,000

28 October 2015 Semi Final	East Bengal	3–0	Dhaka Mohammedan	Chittagong
19:30 BST	Ranti Martins 8', 59'; Mohammed Rafique 48'			Stadium: M. A. Aziz Stadium; Attendance: 18,000

30 October 2015 Final	Chittagong Abahani	3–1	East Bengal	Chittagong
19:30 BST	Eleta Kingsley 45+1', 54'; Hemanta Vincent Biswas 57'	Report	Avinabo Bag 11'	Stadium: M. A. Aziz Stadium; Attendance: 30,000

=== I-League ===
==== Table ====
Pos	Team	Pld	W	D	L	GF	GA	GD	Pts	Qualification or relegation
1	Bengaluru (C)	16	10	2	4	24	17	+7	32	Qualification to Champions League qualifying play-off
2	Mohun Bagan	16	8	6	2	32	16	+16	30	Qualification to AFC Cup qualifying play-off (Note: Mohun Bagan qualified for the 2017 AFC Cup by winning the 2015–16 Federation Cup.)
3	East Bengal	16	7	4	5	22	18	+4	25	
4	Sporting Goa	16	5	7	4	24	20	+4	22	Withdrew (Note: Sporting Goa and Salgaocar withdrew from I-League.)
5	Mumbai	16	4	7	5	20	19	+1	19	

Source: I-League
Rules for classification: 1) points; 2) head-to-head points; 3) head-to-head goal difference; 4) goal difference; 5) number of goals scored; 6) play-off match
(C) Champions

==== Fixtures & results ====
Win Draw Loss

10 January 2016 1	Sporting Club de Goa	1–3	East Bengal	Margao
16:30 IST	Odafa Onyeka Okolie 29'; Alber Gonsalves (yellow card) 73'; Mahmoud Amnah (yellow card) 76'	Report	Ranti Martins 67', 81'; Bikash Jairu 78'	Stadium: Fatorda Stadium; Referee: R. Venkatesh

17 January 2016 2	Mumbai	0–0	East Bengal	Mumbai
19:05 IST	Eric Brown (yellow card) 32'	Report	Sanju Pradhan (yellow card) 39'; Harmanjot Khabra (yellow card) 40'; Ranti Martins (yellow card) 45+1'	Stadium: Cooperage Ground; Referee: P. Vairamuthu

23 January 2016 3^{(KD)}	Mohun Bagan	1–1	East Bengal	Kolkata
14:30 IST	Pronay Halder (yellow card) 53'; Luciano Sabrosa (yellow card) 72'; Dhanachandra Singh (yellow card) 76'; Cornell Glen 77'	Report	Arnab Mondal (yellow card) 53'; Ranti Martins 63'; Rahul Bheke (yellow card) 88'	Stadium: Salt Lake Stadium; Referee: A. Rowan

26 January 2016 4	East Bengal	1–0	DSK Shivajians	Kolkata
19:05 IST	Ranti Martins 29'	Report	Abdul Hakku (yellow card) 8'; Milan Singh (yellow card) 81'	Stadium: Barasat Stadium; Referee: Priyobarta Singh

30 January 2016 5	East Bengal	0–1	Bengaluru	Kolkata
14:05 IST	Rehenesh TP (yellow card) 6'; Samad Ali Mallick (yellow card) 8'; Ranti Martins (yellow card) 62'; Bikash Jairu (yellow card) 75'	Report	Seiminlen Doungel (yellow card) 26'; Sunil Chhetri 60'; Lalchhuanmawia (yellow card) 83'	Stadium: Barasat Stadium; Referee: Santosh Kumar

5 February 2016 6	East Bengal	2–0	Aizawl	Kolkata
14:30 IST	Rahul Bheke (yellow card) 17'; Bikash Jairu 72'; Bernard Mendy 74'	Report	Yuta Kinowaki (yellow card) 27'	Stadium: Barasat Stadium; Referee: A. Meitei

9 February 2016 7	East Bengal	4–0	Shillong Lajong	Kolkata
19:05 IST	Ranti Martins 17', 26', 37'; Bikash Jairu 52'	Report	Chinglensana Singh (yellow card) 61' (yellow-red card) 82'	Stadium: Barasat Stadium; Referee: Umesh Bora

21 February 2016 8	East Bengal	2–1	Salgaocar	Kolkata
14:30 IST	Rafique 38'; Bello Razaq 83'	Report	Darryl Duffy 65'	Stadium: Barasat Stadium; Referee: R. Venkatesh

1 March 2016 9	Salgaocar	3–1	East Bengal	Vasco da Gama
16:00 IST	Thongkhosiem Haokip 4', 90+5'; Calvin Mbarga 36' (pen.)	Report	Ranti Martins 25'; Samad Ali Mallick (yellow card) 35'; Sehnaj Singh (red card) 78'	Stadium: Tilak Maidan Stadium; Referee: Umesh Bora

6 March 2016 10	DSK Shivajians	2–0	East Bengal	Pune
16:00 IST	Douhou Pierre 8'; Surchandra Singh (yellow card) 45'; Zohmingliana Ralte (yellow card) 64'; Juan Quero 66'	Report	Ranti Martins 25'; Samad Ali Mallick (yellow card) 35'; Sehnaj Singh (red card) 78'	Stadium: Balewadi Stadium; Referee: C.R. Srikrishna

12 March 2016 11	Aizawl	2–3	East Bengal	Aizawl
16:00 IST	Brandon Vanlalremdika 19'; Alfred Jaryan (yellow card) 47'; Yuta Kinowaki 58'; Lalramchullova (yellow card) 64' (yellow-red card) 90'; David Lalrinmuana (yellow card) 65'; Emmanuel Chigozie (red card) 67'	Report	Sehnaj Singh (yellow card) 27'; Robert Lalthlamuana (yellow card) 47'; Ranti Martins 69' (pen.), 85', 88'; Bikash Jairu (yellow card) 90+3'	Stadium: Rajiv Gandhi Stadium; Referee: Om Prakash Thakur

2 April 2016 12^{(KD)}	East Bengal	2–1	Mohun Bagan	Siliguri
16:30 IST	Do Dong-hyun 40' (pen.), 75' (yellow card) 75'; Bello Razaq (yellow card) 45+1'; Sehnaj Singh (yellow card) 90+4'	Report	Luciano Sabrosa (yellow card) 38'; Katsumi Yusa 83'; Pritam Kotal (yellow card) 84'; Pronay Halder (yellow card) 87'	Stadium: Kanchenjunga Stadium; Referee: Santosh Kumar

5 April 2016 13	East Bengal	2–2	Mumbai	Kolkata
19:05 IST	Rahul Bheke (yellow card) 11'; Luis Barreto (yellow card) 14'; Ranti Martins 25'; Cavin Lobo (yellow card) 39'; Bernard Mendy 59'	Report	Steven Dias 15'; Pratik Chaudhari (yellow card) 44'; Allan Dias (yellow card) 67'; Ashutosh Mehta 77'	Stadium: Barasat Stadium; Referee: A. Rowan

10 April 2016 14	Bengaluru	3–1	East Bengal	Bengaluru
19:05 IST	Eugeneson Lyngdoh 28'; Sunil Chhetri (yellow card) 61'; Kim Song-yong 63'; Malsawmzuala 68'	Report	Do Dong-hyun 27' (yellow card) 39'; Bernard Mendy (yellow card) 47'	Stadium: Kanteerava Stadium; Referee: C.R. Srikrishna

15 April 2016 15	East Bengal	0–0	Sporting Club de Goa	Kolkata
19:05 IST	Samad Ali Mallick (yellow card) 44'; Mehtab Hossain (yellow card) 60'; Narayan Das (yellow card) 68' (yellow-red card) 86'	Report	Mehrajuddin Wadoo (yellow card) 57' (yellow-red card) 59'; Fulganco Cardozo (yellow card) 67'	Stadium: Barasat Stadium; Referee: B. Balasubramanium

24 April 2016 16	Shillong Lajong	1–0	East Bengal	Shillong
19:05 IST	Isaac Vanmalsawma 62'; Uilliams Bomfim Souza (yellow card) 64'; Chinglensana Singh (yellow card) 83'	Report		Stadium: Jawaharlal Nehru Stadium; Referee: Om Prakash Thakur

=== Federation Cup ===
Quarter-finals
1	Bengaluru FC	1	2	3
8	Aizawl	2	3	5
4	Sporting Goa	1	1	2
5	Mumbai	0	0	0
3	East Bengal	1	2	3
6	Shillong Lajong (aet)	2	2	4
2	Mohun Bagan	3	4	7
7	Salgaocar	2	0	2

Semi-finals
8	Aizawl (a)	0	2	2
4	Sporting Goa	0	2	2
6	Shillong Lajong	0	0	0
2	Mohun Bagan	5	0	5

Final
8	Aizawl	0
2	Mohun Bagan	5

==== Fixtures & results ====
Win Draw Loss

1 May 2016 Quarter-Final 1st Leg	Shillong Lajong	2–1	East Bengal	Shillong
17:00 IST	Konsham Singh 33'; Fábio Pena 62'	Report	Do Dong-hyun 44'	Stadium: Jawaharlal Nehru Stadium

4 May 2016 Quarter-Final 2nd Leg	East Bengal	2–2 (a.e.t.) (3–4 agg.)	Shillong Lajong	Kolkata
16:30 IST	Ranti Martins 23'; Lalrindika Ralte 37'	Report	Fábio Pena 17'; Uilliams Bomfim Souza 114'	Stadium: Barasat Stadium

== Statistics ==
=== Appearances ===
Players with no appearances are not included in the list.
As of end of 2015-16 season.

Appearances for East Bengal in 2015–16 season
No.	Pos.	Nat.	Name	CFL		I League		Fed Cup		S.K. Int. Cup		Total	
No.	Pos.	Nat.	Name	Apps	Starts	Apps	Starts	Apps	Starts	Apps	Starts	Apps	Starts
Goalkeepers
13	GK	(India)	Rehenesh TP			8	8	2	2			10	10
30	GK	(India)	Luis Barreto	9	9	8	8	0	0			17	17
26	GK	(India)	Abhra Mondal	1	1	0	0			0	0	1	1
31	GK	(India)	Dibyendu Sarkar	0	0	0	0			5	5	5	5
Defenders
6	DF	(Nigeria)	Bello Razaq	8	8	16	16	2	2	5	5	31	31
3	DF	(India)	Arnab Mondal	3	3	13	13	2	2			18	18
5	DF	(India)	Rahul Bheke	5	4	10	9	0	0			15	13
45	DF	(France)	Bernard Mendy			9	9	1	0			10	9
28	DF	(India)	Saumik Dey	7	6	8	7	0	0			15	13
38	DF	(India)	Samad Ali Mallick	6	6	6	6	0	0	2	1	12	12
19	DF	(India)	Robert Lalthlamuana	3	3	5	5	0	0			8	8
4	DF	(India)	Narayan Das			3	3	2	2			5	5
12	DF	(India)	Deepak Mondal	7	7	2	1	2	2	5	5	16	15
16	DF	(India)	Gurwinder Singh	2	1	0	0	0	0			2	1
24	DF	(India)	Babu Mondal	1	1					3	0	4	1
40	DF	(India)	Biswajit Saha	0	0					5	5	5	5
22	DF	(India)	Avinabo Bag	1	1	0	0			4	4	5	5
Midfielders
14	MF	(India)	Mehtab Hossain	8	8	14	14	2	2			24	24
21	MF	(South Korea)	Do Dong-Hyun	10	10	13	10	2	2	1	1	26	23
8	MF	(India)	Mohammed Rafique	9	8	12	6	2	0	5	5	28	19
23	MF	(India)	Bikash Jairu	8	8	11	9	0	0			19	17
11	MF	(India)	Cavin Lobo	5	3	9	2	0	0			14	5
15	MF	(India)	Sanju Pradhan			9	7	2	1			11	8
2	MF	(India)	Sehnaj Singh			8	3	0	0			8	3
34	MF	(India)	Abhinas Ruidas	5	4	8	8	1	0	4	3	18	15
7	MF	(India)	Harmanjot Khabra	8	7	7	5	2	2			17	14
28	MF	(India)	Shylo Malsawmtluanga	9	2	7	4	2	1			18	7
17	MF	(India)	Joaquim Abranches			7	4	0	0			7	4
20	MF	(India)	Lalrindika Ralte			2	1	2	2			4	3
35	MF	(India)	Anthony Soren	2	1					3	1	5	2
36	MF	(India)	Prohlad Roy	6	6	0	0			5	5	11	11
18	MF	(India)	Subodh Kumar	0	0	0	0			5	5	5	5
33	MF	(India)	Jagannath Sana	1	0					3	1	4	1
Forwards
10	FW	(Nigeria)	Ranti Martins	6	0	16	16	2	2	5	5	29	23
25	FW	(India)	Jiten Murmu	6	3					0	0	6	3
43	FW	(Nigeria)	Orok Essien							4	4	4	4
27	FW	(India)	C. S. Sabeeth			5	2	0	0			5	2

=== Goal Scorers ===
As of end of 2015-16 season.

Goals for East Bengal in 2015–16 season
Rank	No.	Pos.	Nat.	Name	CFL	I League	Fed Cup	S.K. Int. Cup	Total
1	10	FW	(Nigeria)	Ranti Martins	1	12	1	3	17
2	21	FW	(South Korea)	Do Dong-hyun	12	3	1	0	16
3	8	MF	(India)	Mohammed Rafique	4	1	0	3	8
4	23	MF	(India)	Bikash Jairu	1	3	0		4
5	5	DF	(India)	Rahul Bheke	3	0	0		3
6	6	MF	(Nigeria)	Bello Razaq	1	1	0	0	2
6	7	MF	(India)	Harmanjot Khabra	2	0	0		2
6	36	MF	(India)	Prohlad Roy	1	0		1	2
6	45	DF	(France)	Bernard Mendy		2	0		2
10	14	DF	(India)	Mehtab Hossain	1	0	0		1
10	20	MF	(India)	Lalrindika Ralte		0	1		1
10	22	MF	(India)	Avinabo Bag	0	0		1	1
10	25	FW	(India)	Jiten Murmu	1				1
10	29	DF	(India)	Saumik Dey	1	0	0		1
10	34	MF	(India)	Abhinas Ruidas	1	0	0	0	1
10	43	MF	(Nigeria)	Orok Essien				1	1
Own goals					0	0	0	0	0
Total					29	22	3	9	63

== See also ==
- 2015–16 in Indian football
