= 2015 Sheikh Kamal International Club Cup =

International club football tournament by the Bangladesh Football Federation

Tournament details
- Host country: Bangladesh
- City: Chittagong
- Dates: 20–30 October 2015
- Teams: 8 (from 5 nations under AFC)
- Venue: M. A. Aziz Stadium

Final positions
- Champions: (Bangladesh) Chittagong Abahani (1st title)
- Runners-up: (India) East Bengal

Tournament statistics
- Matches played: 15
- Goals scored: 54 (3.6 per match)
- Top scorer: (Nigeria) Eleta Kingsley (5 goals)
- Best player: (Nigeria) Eleta Kingsley

The 2015 Sheikh Kamal International Club Cup, also known as Sheikh Kamal Gold Cup 2015, was the 1st edition of Sheikh Kamal International Club Cup, an international club football tournament hosted by the Chittagong Abahani in association with the Bangladesh Football Federation. This tournament took place at the M. A. Aziz Stadium from 20 October 2015 to 30 October 2015 in the port city of Chittagong. Participation fees for each team was US$ 5000.

Chittagong Abahani won the inaugural edition of the tournament by defeating East Bengal 3–1.

== Participating teams ==
Eight clubs sent their teams to participate in the tournament from five nations of AFC. Three team from Bangladesh, two from India, one each from Sri Lanka, Pakistan and Afghanistan participated.

Following are the participated teams:

- (Bangladesh) Chittagong Abahani (Host)
- (Bangladesh) Abahani Limited Dhaka
- (Bangladesh) Mohammedan Dhaka
- (India) Mohammedan Kolkata
- (India) East Bengal
- (Pakistan) K-Electric
- (Sri Lanka) Solid SC
- (Afghanistan) De Spin Ghar Bazan

== Round ==
Phase	Date
Group Stage	20–25 October 2015
Semi-finals	27–28 October 2015
Final	30 October 2015

== Prize money ==
Prize money for 2015 Sheikh Kamal International Club Cup.

	Purse
Champions	US$ 25,000
Runners-up	US$ 10,000
Match winners	US$ 1,000
Man of the Match	US$ 500

== Draw ==
The draw ceremony was held 19:00 BST at Pan Pacific Hotel Sonargaon Dhaka on 12 October 2015.The Eight teams were divided into two groups. Top two teams from each group will move into the Semi-Finals.

=== Group draw ===
Group A	Group B
(Afghanistan) De Spin Ghar Bazan	(India) East Bengal
(Sri Lanka) Solid SC	(Bangladesh) Abahani Limited Dhaka
(Bangladesh) Mohammedan Dhaka	(Bangladesh) Chittagong Abahani
(India) Mohammedan Kolkata	(Pakistan) K-Electric

== Group stage ==
All times are Bangladesh Standard Time (BST) – UTC+06:00. The eight participants are divided into two groups. The top two teams from each group will move on to the semifinals.

=== Group A ===
Pos	Team	Pld	W	D	L	GF	GA	GD	Pts	Qualification
1	(Afghanistan) De Spin Ghar Bazan	3	2	1	0	7	4	+3	7	Advance to Semi-finals
2	(Bangladesh) Mohammedan Dhaka	3	2	0	1	8	3	+5	6	Advance to Semi-finals
3	(Sri Lanka) Solid SC	3	1	0	2	4	10	−6	3	
4	(India) Mohammedan Kolkata	3	0	1	2	5	7	−2	1	

Source: GSA

21 October 2015
16:30

Solid SC (Sri Lanka)	2–1	(India) Mohammedan Kolkata
Shola 47'; Vinoth 88'	Report	Manneh 39'

M. A. Aziz Stadium, Chittagong
Attendance: 2,000
Referee: Russel Talukdar

21 October 2015
19:30

Mohammedan Dhaka (Bangladesh)	0–1	(Afghanistan) De Spin Ghar Bazan
	Report	Akbari 33'

M. A. Aziz Stadium, Chittagong
Attendance: 8,000
Referee: Hemonto Islam

23 October 2015
16:30

Mohammedan Dhaka (Bangladesh)	6–1	(Sri Lanka) Solid SC
Mahmud 10'; Jony 18'; Baidya 24'; Jibon 32'; Camara 48'; Sohag 75'	Report	Olayemi 45+3'

M. A. Aziz Stadium, Chittagong
Attendance: 16,000
Referee: Rubel Mridha

23 October 2015
19:30

Mohammedan Kolkata (India)	3–3	(Afghanistan) De Spin Ghar Bazan
Omolaja 41' (pen.); Manneh 71'; Amobi 90'	Report	Akbari 11'; Hakimi 48'; Yari 87'

M. A. Aziz Stadium, Chittagong
Attendance: 8,000
Referee: Billal Islam

25 October 2015
16:30

De Spin Ghar Bazan (Afghanistan)	3–1	(Sri Lanka) Solid SC
Afshar 72'; Yari 78'; Niazi 88'	Report	Olayemi 43'

M. A. Aziz Stadium, Chittagong
Attendance: 3,200
Referee: Shahrukh Fakir

25 October 2015
19:30

Mohammedan Dhaka (Bangladesh)	2–1	(India) Mohammedan Kolkata
Peter 13', 90+3'	Report	Amobi 44'

M. A. Aziz Stadium, Chittagong
Attendance: 16,000
Referee: Nayeem Khan

=== Group B ===
Pos	Team	Pld	W	D	L	GF	GA	GD	Pts	Qualification
1	(India) East Bengal	3	2	1	0	5	2	+3	7	Advance to Semi-finals
2	(Bangladesh) Chittagong Abahani (H)	3	2	0	1	6	4	+2	6	Advance to Semi-finals
3	(Bangladesh) Dhaka Abahani	3	1	1	1	3	3	0	4	
4	(Pakistan) K-Electric	3	0	0	3	5	10	−5	0	

Source: GSA
(H) Hosts

20 October 2015
16:30

Abahani Limited Dhaka (Bangladesh)	3–2	(Pakistan) K-Electric
Faisal 24'; Chizoba 30'; Farooq 77' (o.g.)	Report	Rasool 75'; Oludeyi 90+2'

M. A. Aziz Stadium, Chittagong
Attendance: 8,000
Referee: Choyon Nigum

20 October 2015
19:30

Chittagong Abahani (Bangladesh)	1–2	(India) East Bengal
Razaq 78' (o.g.)	Report	Rafique 32'; Roy 72'

M. A. Aziz Stadium, Chittagong
Attendance: 12,000
Referee: Harun Gazi

22 October 2015
16:30

East Bengal (India)	3–1	(Pakistan) K-Electric
Essien 15'; Rafique 25'; Martins 49'	Report	Rasool 84'

M. A. Aziz Stadium, Chittagong
Attendance: 4,000
Referee: Khalek Sheikh

22 October 2015
19:30

Abahani Limited Dhaka (Bangladesh)	0–1	(Bangladesh) Chittagong Abahani
	Report	Hossain 47'

M. A. Aziz Stadium, Chittagong
Attendance: 12,000
Referee: Mizanur Rahman

24 October 2015
16:30

Chittagong Abahani (Bangladesh)	4–2	(Pakistan) K-Electric
Kingsley 12'; Hossain 12', 34', 83' (pen.)	Report	Rasool 25', 45+2' (pen.)

M. A. Aziz Stadium, Chittagong
Attendance: 16,000
Referee: Amin Bepari

24 October 2015
19:30

Abahani Limited Dhaka (Bangladesh)	0–0	(India) East Bengal

M. A. Aziz Stadium, Chittagong
Attendance: 18,000
Referee: Monir Khan

== Knockout stage ==
=== Bracket ===
Semi-finals
A1	(Afghanistan) De Spin Ghar Bazan	1
B2	(Bangladesh) Chittagong Abahani	3
B1	(India) East Bengal	3
A2	(Bangladesh) Mohammedan Dhaka	0

Final
B2	(Bangladesh) Chittagong Abahani	3
B1	(India) East Bengal	1

=== Semi-finals ===
27 October 2015
19:30

De Spin Ghar Bazan (Afghanistan)	1–3	(Bangladesh) Chittagong Abahani
Thomas 79' (o.g.)		Thomas 24'; Kingsley 57', 88'

M. A. Aziz Stadium, Chittagong
Attendance: 24,000
Referee: Sumon Promanik
28 October 2015
19:30

East Bengal (India)	3–0	(Bangladesh) Mohammedan Dhaka
Martins 8', 59'; Rafique 48'

M. A. Aziz Stadium, Chittagong
Attendance: 18,000
Referee: Farukh Islam

=== Final ===
30 October 2015

Chittagong Abahani (Bangladesh)	3–1	(India) East Bengal
Kingsley 45+1', 54'; Biswas 57'	Report	Karim 11' (o.g.)

M. A. Aziz Stadium, Chittagong
Attendance: 40,000
Referee: Jakir Talukdar

== Winners ==
Sheikh Kamal International Club Cup 2015
Winners

Chittagong Abahani
First Title

== Statistics ==
=== Top scorers ===
As of 11 January 2019

Rank	Player	Club	Goals
1	(Nigeria) Eleta Kingsley	Chittagong Abahani	5
2	(Pakistan) Muhammad Rasool	K-Electric	4
2	(Bangladesh) Mohamed Zahid Hossain	Chittagong Abahani	4
4	(Cambodia) Ayesoro Oluwafemi Shola	Solid SC	3
4	(Nigeria) Ranti Martins	East Bengal	3
4	(India) Mohammed Rafique	East Bengal	3

== Sponsorship ==
- SAIF Powertec Ltd. (Title Sponsor) – 2015
- Abul Khair Group (A.K.S) – 2015
- MARKS – 2015
- Muskan Group – 2015
- Dhaka Bank Limited
- Gonona Technologies Ltd. – 2015
- SAIF Powertec Ltd. (Sponsorship Rights Holder) – 2017

== Media partners ==
- Channel 9 (Bangladesh) – 2015
- Mashranga TV (Bangladesh) – 2017
- Razzi TV (Maldives) – 2017
