= 2018–19 K-Electric FC season =

K-Electric
2018-19 season
- Owner: K-Electric
- Head coach: Hassan Baloch
- Stadium: People's Football Stadium
- Premier League: 6th
- National Challenge Cup: Group stage
- Top goalscorer: League: Muhammad Rasool (12); All: Muhammad Rasool (12)
Home colours	Away colours

The 2018–19 season is K-Electric's 105th competitive season, 105th consecutive season in the top flight of Pakistani football, 10th consecutive season in the Pakistan Premier League since gaining promotion from Football Federation League in 2006 and 105th year in existence as a football club.

== Club ==
=== Coaching staff ===
Position	Staff
Manager	(Pakistan) Mujtaba Hussain
Assistant manager	(Pakistan) Saeed Sr.
Assistant manager	(Pakistan) Muhammad Essa
Local coach	(Pakistan) Imran Khan
Local coach	(Pakistan) Shahbaz Khan

Source: Global Sports Archive

=== Other information ===
Owner	(Pakistan) K-Electric
Chairman	(Pakistan) Zabe Khan

Source: Global Sports Archive

== First team squad ==
As of 13 January 2019.

Squad No.	Name	Nationality	Position(s)	Since	Date of birth (age)	Signed from	Games played	Goals scored
Goalkeepers
1	Jahangir Khan	(Pakistan)	GK	2011	2 May 1991 (aged 27)	Academy	32	0
24	Ghulam	(Pakistan)	GK	2013	29 December 1988 (aged 29)	(Pakistan) Khan Research Laboratories	28	0
Defenders
2	Umar Farooq	(Pakistan)	RB	2014	18 October 1989 (aged 28)	Academy	39	0
3	Hayatullah Khan	(Pakistan)	CB	2012	2 March 1987 (aged 31)	(Pakistan) Habib Bank	58	0
4	Waseem Shahzad	(Pakistan)	LB	2018	8 November 1990 (aged 27)	(Pakistan) Khan Research Laboratories	26	1
6	Wali Khan	(Pakistan)	CB	2009	4 February 1986 (aged 32)	Academy	111	2
14	Ali Khan Niazi	(Pakistan)	CB	2018	12 December 2000 (aged 17)	(Pakistan) Civil Aviation Authority	20	0
19	Akbar Ali	(Pakistan)	CB	2014	5 April 1980 (aged 38)	Free Agent	15	0
25	Muhammad Ali	(Pakistan)	RB / LB	2014	31 January 1977 (aged 41)	Free Agent	1	0
Midfielders
5	Aurangzeb Baloch	(Pakistan)	CM / DM	2011	23 February 1991 (aged 27)	Academy	101	0
8	Mohammad Mossa	(Pakistan)	CM	2014	10 March 1981 (aged 37)	Academy	15	0
10	Muhammad Riaz	(Pakistan)	RW / LW	2014	27 June 1996 (aged 22)	(Pakistan) Sui Southern Gas	21	6
13	Muhammad Dawood	(Pakistan)	AM	2015	4 March 1992 (aged 26)	(Pakistan) Khan Research Laboratories	25	1
6	Abid Ghafoor	(Pakistan)	CM	2011	20 August 1985 (aged 33)	(Pakistan) Khan Research Laboratories	77	1
21	Abayomi Wilson	(Nigeria)	CM	2014	8 November 1995 (aged 22)	(Nigeria) Dolphin	33	3
22	Jalil Ahmed	(Pakistan)	CM	2011	2 January 1989 (aged 29)	Academy	124	3
Strikers
7	Abdul Rehman	(Pakistan)	CF	2009	23 March 1985 (aged 33)	(Pakistan) Karachi Port Trust	42	11
9	Muhammad Rasool	(Pakistan)	CF	2009	23 March 1985 (aged 33)	(Pakistan) Khan Research Laboratories	171	116
11	Murtaza Hussain	(Pakistan)	CF	2016	22 December 1990 (aged 27)	(Pakistan) Khan Research Laboratories	26	9
15	Noman	(Pakistan)	CF	2018	7 July 1997 (aged 21)	(Pakistan) Civil Aviation Authority	25	2

== Season ==
=== National Challenge Cup ===
K-Electric were placed in group H with two second division teams, including runners-up Sui Northern Gas and Asia Ghee Mills. K-Electric finished last in their group after losing 1-0 to Sui Northern Gas and drew 0-0 to Asia Ghee Mills.

==== Table ====
Pos	Team	Pld	W	D	L	GF	GA	GD	Pts	Qualification
1	Asia Ghee Mills	2	1	1	0	1	0	+1	4	Advance to Knockout round
2	Sui Northern Gas	2	1	0	1	1	1	0	3	
3	K-Electric	2	0	1	1	0	1	−1	1	

Updated to match(es) played on 21 April 2018. Source:

==== Matches ====
25 April 2018 Group Stage	K-Electric	0–1	Sui Northern Gas	Karachi
16:30 PST	Riaz (yellow card) 78'	Report	M. Ahmed (yellow card) 14'; Umair Javed 60'	Stadium: KPT Sports Complex

3 May 2018 Group stage	Asia Ghee Mills	0–0	K-Electric	Karachi
16:30 PST	A. Wassay (yellow card) 14'; Shehzad Mehmood (yellow card) 23'; Syed Ghazi Khan (yellow card) 76'	Report		Stadium: KPT Sports Complex

=== Premier League ===
==== Tables ====
Pos	Team	Pld	W	D	L	GF	GA	GD	Pts
4	Pakistan Army	26	12	10	4	38	19	+19	46
5	WAPDA	26	13	6	7	32	18	+14	45
6	K-Electric	26	10	11	5	30	21	+9	41
7	Civil Aviation Authority	26	11	6	9	31	27	+4	39
8	National Bank	26	9	6	11	27	27	0	33

Source: Soccerway.com
Rules for classification: 1) points; 2) head-to-head points; 3) head-to-head goal difference; 4) goal difference; 5) number of goals scored; 6) drawing of lots

==== Matches ====
26 September 2018 1	Airforce	0–0	K-Electric	Multan
20:00 PST				Stadium: Qilla Kohna Qasim Bagh Stadium

29 September 2018 2	Afghan Chaman	2–2	K-Electric	Multan
20:00 PST	A. Rahim 47' (pen.), 55'		Rasool 84'; M. Dawood 90+4'	Stadium: Qilla Kohna Qasim Bagh Stadium

3 October 2018 3	Karachi Port Trust	0–1	K-Electric	Multan
20:00 PST			Riaz 48'	Stadium: Qilla Kohna Qasim Bagh Stadium

10 October 2018 4	K-Electric	4–0; Annulled	Ashraf Sugar Mills	Multan
22:45 PST	Rasool 11' (pen.), 79'; Murtuza Hussain 49'; A. Rehman 90'			Stadium: Qilla Kohna Qasim Bagh Stadium

15 October 2018 5	Navy	1–2	K-Electric	Multan
22:45 PST	A. Rehmaan 55' (pen.)		Rasool 57' (pen.), 64'	Stadium: Qilla Kohna Qasim Bagh Stadium

21 October 2018 6	Khan Research Laboratories	1–1	K-Electric	Multan
22:45 PST	Izharullah 11'		Rasool 21'	Stadium: Qilla Kohna Qasim Bagh Stadium

24 October 2018 7	Civil Aviation Authority	0–3	K-Electric	Lahore
22:45 PST			Riaz 4'; Abayomi Wilson 30'; Rasool 35'	Stadium: Punjab Stadium

28 October 2018 8	K-Electric	0–2	Sui Southern Gas	Lahore
22:45 PST			M. Lal 88'; Mehmood Khan 90+2'	Stadium: Punjab Stadium

1 November 2018 9	National Bank	1–1	K-Electric	Lahore
22:45 PST	Maqbool 60'		Nouman 43'	Stadium: Punjab Stadium

4 November 2018 10	Muslim	0–0	K-Electric	Lahore
22:45 PST				Stadium: Punjab Stadium

7 November 2018 11	Sui Northern Gas	3–0	K-Electric	Lahore
22:45 PST	Samad Khan 22'; A. Wassay 80'; Tauseef 87'			Stadium: Punjab Stadium

19 November 2018 12	Baloch Nushki	2–4	K-Electric	Karachi
22:45 PST	Daulat Khan 11', 67'		Rasool 4', 90+2'; Murtuza Hussain 13', 49'	Stadium: Korangi Baloch Stadium

22 November 2018 13	Pakistan Army	0–0	K-Electric	Karachi
22:45 PST				Stadium: KMC Stadium

25 November 2018 14	K-Electric	1–0	WAPDA	Karachi
22:45 PST	Murtaza Hussain 61'			Stadium: KMC Stadium

28 November 2018 15	K-Electric	0–0	Pakistan Airforce	Karachi
22:45 PST				Stadium: KPT Stadium

1 December 2018 16	K-Electric	0–0	Afghan Chaman	Karachi
22:45 PST				Stadium: KPT Stadium

4 December 2018 17	K-Electric	0–1	Karachi Port Trust	Karachi
22:45 PST			M. Bin Younis 32' (pen.)	Stadium: KPT Stadium

7 December 2018 18	Ashraf Sugar Mills	Cancelled	K-Electric	Karachi
22:45 PST				Stadium: KMC Stadium

10 December 2018 19	K-Electric	4–1	Pakistan Navy	Karachi
22:45 PST	Murtaza Hussain 34'; Rasool 45'; M. Riaz 75', 90'			Stadium: KMC Stadium

13 December 2018 20	K-Electric	1–1	Khan Research Laboratories	Karachi
22:45 PST	Abayomi Wilson 82'		Junaid Ahmed 61'	Stadium: KMC Stadium

16 December 2018 21	K-Electric	2–0	Civil Aviation Authority	Karachi
22:45 PST	Nouman 20'; Murtuza Hussain 87'			Stadium: KMC Stadium

19 December 2018 22	Sui Southern Gas	3–0	K-Electric	Karachi
22:45 PST	Bilawal-ur-Rehman 35'; Jadeed 45'; A. Salam 61'			Stadium: KMC Stadium

22 December 2018 23	K-Electric	1–0	National Bank	Karachi
22:45 PST	Murtuza Hussain 61'			Stadium: KMC Stadium

25 December 2018 24	K-Electric	2–0	Muslim	Karachi
22:45 PST	Murtuza Hussain 9'; Rasool 84'			Stadium: KMC Stadium

28 December 2018 25	K-Electric	3–0	Sui Northern Gas	Karachi
22:45 PST	Murtuza Hussain 75'; Riaz 88'; Rasool 90+1'			Stadium: KMC Stadium

3 January 2018 26	K-Electric	1–1	Baloch Nushki	Karachi
22:45 PST	Waseem Shehzad 75'		M. Asif 72'	Stadium: KMC Stadium

7 January 2018 27	K-Electric	0–1	Pakistan Army	Karachi
22:45 PST			Anser Abbas 90+2'	Stadium: KMC Stadium

10 January 2018 28	WAPDA	1–1	K-Electric	Karachi
22:45 PST	Ahmed Faheem 60'		Riaz 1'	Stadium: KMC Stadium

== Statistics ==
=== Appearances ===
No.	Pos.	Name	Premier League		Challenge Cup		Total		Discipline	
No.	Pos.	Name	Apps	Goals	Apps	Goals	Apps	Goals	Yellow card	Red card
1	GK	(Pakistan) Jahangir Khan	21	0	2	0	23	0	0	0
2	DF	(Pakistan) Umar Farooq	21	0	2	0	23	0	3	0
3	DF	(Pakistan) Hayat Ullah	9 (4)	0	2	0	11 (4)	0	0	0
4	DF	(Pakistan) Waseem Shehzad	26	1	2	0	28	1	1	0
5	MF	(Pakistan) Aurangzeb Baloch	20 (3)	0	0	0	20 (3)	0	0	0
6	DF	(Pakistan) Wali Khan	0	0	0	0	0	0	0	0
7	FW	(Pakistan) Abdul Rehman	16 (11)	0	2	0	18 (11)	1	0	0
8	MF	(Pakistan) Mohammad Moosa	15 (8)	0	2	0	17 (8)	0	0	0
9	FW	(Pakistan) Muhammad Rasool	24 (1)	12	2	0	26 (1)	12	0	0
10	MF	(Pakistan) Muhammad Riaz	21 (3)	6	2	0	23 (3)	6	0	0
11	FW	(Pakistan) Murtuza Hussain	26	9	0	0	26	9	2	0
14	MF	(Pakistan) Mohammad Dawood	26 (4)	1	2	0	28 (4)	1	2	0
14	MF	(Pakistan) Ali Khan Niazi	20	0	2	0	22	0	4	0
15	FW	(Pakistan) Nouman	25	2	2	0	27	2	0	0
16	MF	(Pakistan) Abid Ghafoor	3 (2)	0	0	0	3 (2)	0	0	0
19	DF	(Pakistan) Akber Ali	8	0	2	0	10	0	1	0
21	MF	(Nigeria) Abayomi Wilson	20	2	0	2	20	2	3	0
22	MF	(Pakistan) Jalil Ahmed	27	0	2	0	29	0	2	0
24	GK	(Pakistan) Ghulam Nabi	8 (2)	0	0	0	8 (2)	0	0	0
25	DF	(Pakistan) Muhammad Ali	0	0	0	0	0	0	0	0
27	FW	(Pakistan) Muhammad Yaqoob	6 (6)	0	0	0	6 (6)	0	0	0
–	GK	(Pakistan) Orangzeb Shahmir	0	0	0	0	0	0	0	0
–	MF	(Pakistan) Zain Ul Abdeen	0	0	0	0	0	0	0	0
–	MF	(Pakistan) Aftab	0	0	0	0	0	0	0	0

Last updated: 13 January 2019.
Source: Sports Archive

=== Top scorers ===
Rank	No.	Pos.	Player	Premier League	National Challenge Cup	Total
1	9	FW	(Pakistan) Muhammad Rasool	12	0	12
2	11	FW	(Pakistan) Murtaza Hussain	9	0	9
3	13	MF	(Pakistan) Muhammad Riaz	6	0	6
4	21	MF	(Nigeria) Abayomi Wilson	3	0	3
4	15	FW	(Pakistan) Nouman	3	0	3
6	13	MF	(Pakistan) Muhammad Dawood	1	0	1
6	7	FW	(Pakistan) Abdul Rehman	1	0	1
6	4	DF	(Pakistan) Syed Waseem Shehzad	1	0	1

Last updated: 13 January 2019.
Source: [ K-Electric F.C.]

=== Summary ===
Competition	P	W	D	L	GF	GA	CS	Booked	(yellow card) (yellow-red card)	Sent off (straight red)
Pakistan Premier League	26	10	11	5	30	21	13	18	0	0
National Challenge Cup	2	0	1	1	0	1	1	0	0	0
Total	28	10	12	6	30	22	14	18	0	0

=== Summary ===
Games played	28 (26 Pakistan Premier League) (2 National Football Challenge Cup)
Games won	10 (10 Pakistan Premier League)
Games drawn	12 (11 Pakistan Premier League) (2 National Football Challenge Cup)
Games lost	6 (5 Pakistan Premier League) (1 National Football Challenge Cup)
Goals scored	30 (30 Pakistan Premier League)
Goals conceded	22 (21 Pakistan Premier League) (1 National Football Challenge Cup)
Goal difference	+8 (9 Pakistan Premier League) (-1 National Football Challenge Cup)
Clean sheets	14 (13 Pakistan Premier League) (1 National Football Challenge Cup)
Yellow cards	18 (18 Pakistan Premier League)
Most appearances	(Pakistan) Jalil Ahmed (28 appearances)
Top scorer	(Pakistan) Muhammad Rasool (12 goals)
Winning Percentage	Overall: 10/28 (35.7%)

Last updated: 13 January 2019.
Source: K-Electric F.C.
