= Masuk Mia Jony =

Bangladeshi footballer

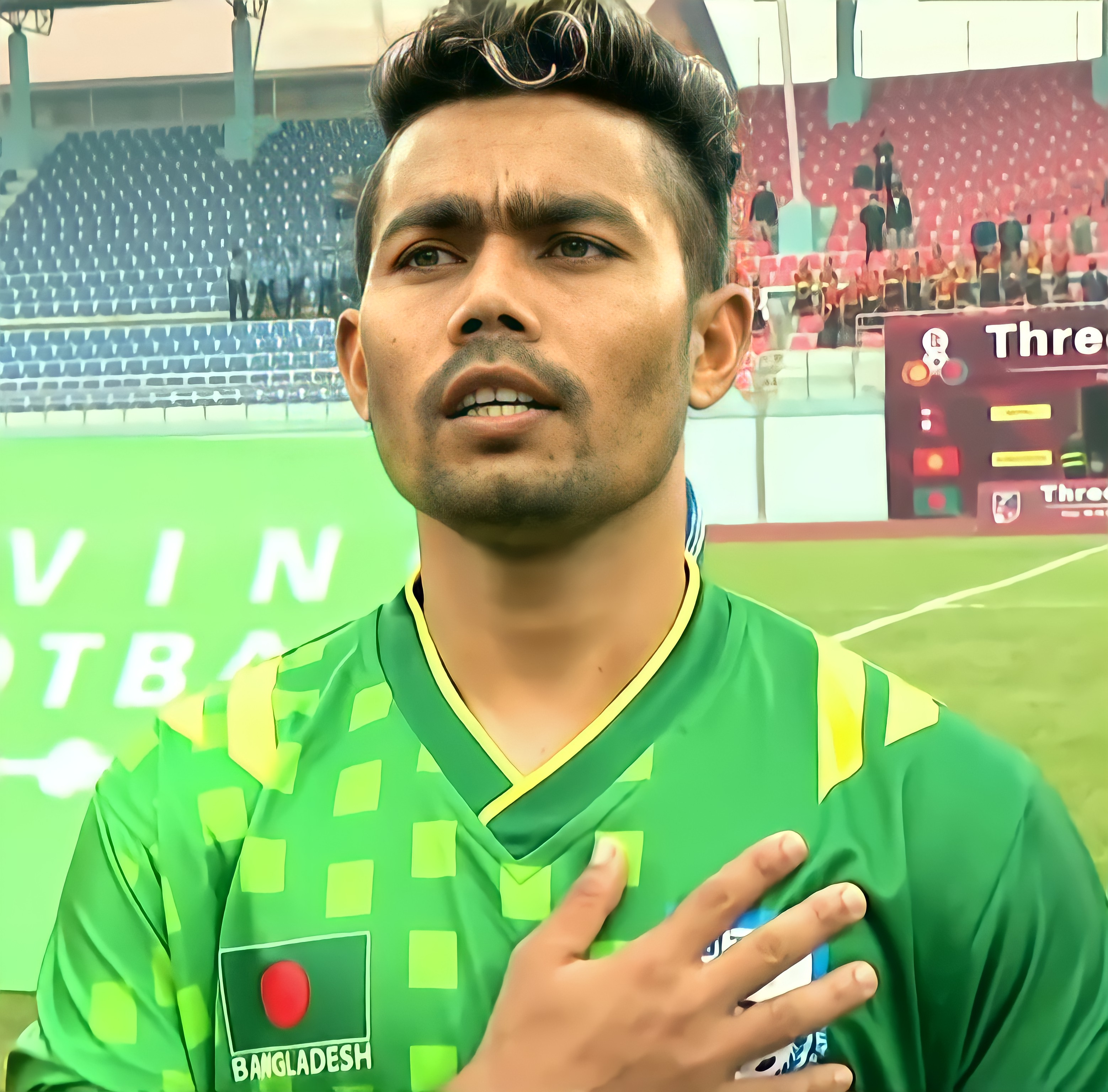
- Jony with Bangladesh in 2021

Personal information
- Full name: Masuk Mia Jony
- Date of birth: 16 January 1998 (age 28)
- Place of birth: Moulvibazar, Bangladesh
- Height: 1.67 m (5 ft 5 1/2 in)
- Position: Defensive midfielder

Senior career*
| Years | Team | Apps | (Gls) |
| 2013–2015 | Chittagong Abahani | | (1) |
| 2015–2017 | Mohammedan SC | | (2) |
| 2017–2018 | Chittagong Abahani | 20 | (0) |
| 2018 | → Saif SC (loan) | 0 | (0) |
| 2018–2024 | Bashundhara Kings | 95 | (0) |

International career^{‡}
| 2015 | Bangladesh U19 | | (2) |
| 2017–2019 | Bangladesh U23 | 8 | (0) |
| 2015–2021 | Bangladesh | 17 | (0) |
- * Club domestic league appearances and goals as of 28 July 2021 ‡ National team caps and goals as of 15 June 2021

Masuk Mia Jony (Bengali: মাসুক মিয়া জনি), also spelled as Masuk Miah Zoni, is a Bangladeshi professional footballer who plays as a midfielder. He last played for Bangladesh Premier League club Bashundhara Kings.

== International goals ==
=== U20 ===
Scores and results list Bangladesh's goal tally first.

| # | Date | Venue | Opponent | Score | Result | Competition |
|---|---|---|---|---|---|---|
| 1. | 2 October 2015 | Bangabandhu National Stadium, Dhaka | Sri Lanka U19 | 2–0 | 2–0 | 2016 AFC U-19 Championship qualification |
| 2. | 4 October 2015 | Bangabandhu National Stadium, Dhaka | Bhutan U19 | 1–1 | 1–1 | 2016 AFC U-19 Championship qualification |

=== Club ===
Dhaka Mohammedan

| # | Date | Venue | Opponent | Score | Result | Competition |
|---|---|---|---|---|---|---|
| 1. | 23 October 2015 | M. A. Aziz Stadium, Chittagong | (Sri Lanka) Solid SC | 2–0 | 6–1 | 2015 Sheikh Kamal International Club Cup |
