= 2017 Sheikh Kamal International Club Cup =

Tournament details
- Host country: Bangladesh
- City: Chittagong
- Dates: 18 February – 2 March 2017
- Teams: 8 (from 6 AFC nations)
- Venue: M. A. Aziz Stadium

Final positions
- Champions: (Maldives) TC Sports Club (1st title)
- Runners-up: (South Korea) Pocheon Citizen

Tournament statistics
- Matches played: 15
- Goals scored: 36 (2.4 per match)
- Top scorer(s): (Afghanistan) Amredin Sharifi (4 goals)

The 2017 Sheikh Kamal International Club Cup, also known as Sheikh Kamal Gold Cup 2017, was the 2nd edition of Sheikh Kamal International Club Cup, an international club football tournament hosted by the Chittagong Abahani in association with the Bangladesh Football Federation. The tournament took place at the M. A. Aziz Stadium from 18 February 2017 in the port city of Chittagong. TC Sports Club of Maldives became champion after beating Pocheon Citizen on penalty shoot-out.

== Participating teams ==
Eight clubs sent their team to participate in the tournament from 5 nations of AFC Three teams from Bangladesh, one of each from South Korea, Afghanistan, Maldives, Kyrgyzstan as well as Nepal participated.

Following are the participated teams:

- (Bangladesh) Chittagong Abahani (Host)
- (Bangladesh) Dhaka Mohammedan
- (Bangladesh) Dhaka Abahani
- (South Korea) FC Pocheon
- (Maldives) TC Sports Club
- (Afghanistan) Shaheen Asmayee F.C.
- (Kyrgyzstan) FC Alga Bishkek
- (Nepal) Manang Marshyangdi Club

== Prize money ==
Prize money for 2017 Sheikh Kamal International Club Cup.

	Purse
Champions	US$ 30,000
Runners-up	US$ 10,000

== Venue ==
Chittagong
M. A. Aziz Stadium
Capacity: 30,000

== Draw ==
The draw ceremony were held 16 February 2017 at BFF house Motijheel Dhaka. The eight participants were divided into two groups. The top two teams from each group advanced to the semi-finals.

== Group stage ==
- All matches were played at Chittagong
- Times Listed are UTC+6:00

=== Group A ===
Pos	Team	Pld	W	D	L	GF	GA	GD	Pts	Qualification
1	(Maldives) TC Sports Club	3	2	1	0	4	2	+2	7	Advance to Semi-Finals
2	(South Korea) FC Pocheon	3	1	2	0	3	1	+2	5	Advance to Semi-Finals
3	(Bangladesh) Dhaka Abahani	3	1	1	1	2	2	0	4	
4	(Kyrgyzstan) FC Alga Bishkek	3	0	0	3	2	6	−4	0	

Source: GSA

18 February 2017
15:30

FC Alga Bishkek (Kyrgyzstan)	0–2	(South Korea) FC Pocheon
	Report	Ji Kyeong-deuk 14'; Jang Yong-ik 19'

M. A. Aziz Stadium, Chittagong
Attendance: 2,000

18 February 2017
19:30

Dhaka Abahani (Bangladesh)	0–1	(Maldives) TC Sports Club
	Report	Ibrahim 16'

M. A. Aziz Stadium, Chittagong
Attendance: 8,000

20 February 2017
15:30

FC Pocheon (South Korea)	0–0	(Bangladesh) Dhaka Abahani
	Report

M. A. Aziz Stadium, Chittagong
Attendance: 16,000

20 February 2017
19:30

TC Sports Club (Maldives)	2–1	(Kyrgyzstan) FC Alga Bishkek
Hassan 45+'; Cornelius 70'	Report	Tursunali 36'

M. A. Aziz Stadium, Chittagong
Attendance: 8,000

23 February 2017
15:30

FC Pocheon (South Korea)	1–1	(Maldives) TC Sports Club
Park Jung Soo 77'	Report	Cornelius 45+'

M. A. Aziz Stadium, Chittagong
Attendance: 3,200

23 February 2017
19:30

Dhaka Abahani (Bangladesh)	2–1	(Kyrgyzstan) FC Alga Bishkek
Waly Faisal 27'; Jonathan 40'	Report	Tursunboy Khusanov 75' (pen.)

M. A. Aziz Stadium, Chittagong
Attendance: 16,000

=== Group B ===
Pos	Team	Pld	W	D	L	GF	GA	GD	Pts	Qualification
1	(Bangladesh) Chittagong Abahani	3	1	2	0	5	3	+2	5	Advance to Semi-Finals
2	(Nepal) Manang Marshyangdi Club	3	1	1	1	5	5	0	4	Advance to Semi-Finals
3	(Bangladesh) Dhaka Mohammedan	3	1	1	1	2	3	−1	4	
4	(Afghanistan) Shaheen Asmayee F.C.	3	1	0	2	5	6	−1	3	

Source: GSA

19 February 2017
15:30

Manang Marshyangdi Club (Nepal)	2–0	(Bangladesh) Mohammedan Sporting Club
Afeez Oladipo 53'; Bishal Rai 87'	Report

M. A. Aziz Stadium, Chittagong
Attendance: 2,000

19 February 2017
19:30

Chittagong Abahani (Bangladesh)	3–1	(Afghanistan) Shaheen Asmayee F.C.
Walson 24', 83'; Kingsley Chigozie 40'	Report	Nasir 58'

M. A. Aziz Stadium, Chittagong
Attendance: 8,000

21 February 2017
15:30

Shaheen Asmayee F.C. (Afghanistan)	3–1	(Nepal) Manang Marshyangdi Club
Sharifi 38', 65', 75' (pen.)	Report	Bimal Basnet 72'

M. A. Aziz Stadium, Chittagong
Attendance: 16,000

21 February 2017
19:30

Mohammedan Sporting Club (Bangladesh)	0–0	(Bangladesh) Chittagong Abahani
	Report

M. A. Aziz Stadium, Chittagong
Attendance: 8,000

24 February 2017
15:30

Chittagong Abahani (Bangladesh)	2–2	(Nepal) Manang Marshyangdi Club
Nasiruddin Chowdhury 32'; Walson 63' (pen.)	Report	Afeez Oladipo 3', 22'

M. A. Aziz Stadium, Chittagong
Attendance: 3,200

24 February 2017
19:30

Shaheen Asmayee F.C. (Afghanistan)	1–2	(Bangladesh) Mohammedan Sporting Club
Sharifi 88' (pen.)	Report	Cessay 32', 69'

M. A. Aziz Stadium, Chittagong
Attendance: 16,000

=== Bracket ===
Semi-Finals
GA1	(Maldives) TC Sports Club	1
GB2	(Nepal) Manang Marshyangdi Club	0
Group A Group B
GB1	(Bangladesh) Chittagong Abahani	1
GA2	(South Korea) FC Pocheon	2

Final
GA1	(Maldives) TC Sports Club	2 (4)
GA2	(South Korea) FC Pocheon	2 (2)

== Semi-finals ==
27 February 2017
18:00 BST (UTC+6)

(Maldives) T.C. Sports Club	1–0	(Nepal) Manang Marshyangdi Club
Nafiu Ali 83'	Report

M. A. Aziz Stadium, Chittagong

28 February 2017
18:00 BST (UTC+6)

(South Korea) FC Pocheon	2–1	(Bangladesh) Chittagong Abahani
Jang Yong-ik 43' (pen.); Park Seong Ryeol 46'	Report	Jamal Bhuyan 23'

M. A. Aziz Stadium, Chittagong

== Final ==
3 March 2017

(Maldives) T.C. Sports Club	2–2 (a.e.t.)	(South Korea) FC Pocheon
Abdulla Haneef 18'; Mohamed Azzam 83'	Report	Jang Yong-ik 43'; Farrah Ahmed 19' (o.g.)
Penalties
Esha Ibrahim (penalty scored); Stuard Justin (penalty scored); Ibrahim Mahudhee (penalty scored); Adnan Muruthala (penalty scored)	4–2	(penalty missed) Chutie Jing; (penalty scored) Ji Ki-yung; (penalty scored) Ko Ji-man; (penalty missed) Jo Seul-ki

M. A. Aziz Stadium, Chittagong
Attendance: 15,494
Referee: Mizanur Rahman

== Winners ==
2nd Sheikh Kamal International Club Cup 2017
Winners

TC Sports Club
First Title

== Goalscorers ==
There were 36 goals scored in 15 matches, for an average of 2.4 goals per match.

4 goals

- (Afghanistan) Amredin Sharifi (Shaheen Asmayee F.C.)

3 goals

- (Nigeria) Afeez Oladipo (Manang Marshyangdi Club)
- (South Korea) Jang Yong-ik (FC Pocheon)
- (Haiti) Walson Augustin (Chittagong Abahani)

2 goals

- (Saint Vincent and the Grenadines) Cornelius Stewart (FC Alga Bishkek)
- (The Gambia) Dawda Ceesay (Dhaka Mohammedan)

1 goal

- (South Korea) Ji Kyeong-deuk (FC Pocheon)
- (South Korea) Park Seong Ryeol (FC Pocheon)
- (Maldives) Ibrahim Waheed Hassan (TC Sports Club)
- (Bangladesh) Waly Faisal (Dhaka Abahani)
- (Wales) Jonathan Brown (Dhaka Abahani)
- (Uzbekistan) Tursunboy Khusanov (FC Alga Bishkek)
- (Nepal) Bishal Rai (Manang Marshyangdi Club)
- (Nepal) Bimal Basnet (Manang Marshyangdi Club)
- (Maldives) Ibrahim Mahudhee (TC Sports Club)
- (Bangladesh) Nasiruddin Chowdhury (Chittagong Abahani)
- (Bangladesh) Jamal Bhuyan (Chittagong Abahani)
- (Maldives) Abdulla Haneef (TC Sports Club)
- (Maldives) Mohamed Azzam (TC Sports Club)
- (Maldives) Nafiu Ali (TC Sports Club)
- (South Korea) Park Jung Soo (FC Pocheon)
- (Nigeria) Kingsley Chigozie (Chittagong Abahani)
- (Kyrgyzstan) Tursunali Rustamov (FC Alga Bishkek)
- (Afghanistan) Said Nasir (Shaheen Asmayee F.C.)

== 1 own goal ==
- (Maldives) Farrah Ahmed (playing against FC Pocheon)
