= List of foreign football players in Pakistan =

This list of foreign football players in Pakistan consists of players who are currently playing or have played in Pakistan, either in top division leagues like Pakistan Premier League, PFF League (alongside now defunct National Football Championship), or in other competitions such as Super Football League, etc. alongside domestic knock-out tournaments such as the National Challenge Cup.

- All these players have joined or played or contracted as foreign recruit or footballer for the football clubs all over Pakistan.
- The following players must meet both of the following criteria:
1. A player who joined any Pakistani football club (irrespective of whether he made an appearance for the team or not).
2. A player is considered foreign if he is not eligible to play for the Pakistan national team.
- **Bold** denotes players who have appeared or included in the squad in any edition of the **FIFA World Cup**.

== Afghanistan ==
- Kabirullah Lutfy – Habib Bank (1985–1986)
- Shamsuddin Amiri – Pakistan Television (2001–2002)
- Zohib Islam Amiri – Aga Khan Sports Academy (2002–2005)
- Maihan Tour Faizee – Huma (2014–2021)
- Muhammad Jawad – Huma (2021)
- Yar Mohammad Zakarkhel – Pak Afghan Clearing Agency (2023)
- Ibrahimi – Pak Afghan Clearing Agency (2023)

== England ==
- Jon Ashworth – K-Electric (2015)

== India ==
- Taj Mohammad Sr. – Hazara Club (1940), Sandemanians (1940), Muslim Club Quetta (1950s), Afghan Club Quetta (1950s), Karachi Kickers (1955), North-Western Railway (1957), Raiders (1950s)
- Mohammed Rahmatullah – Dacca Mohammedan (1963–1964), Dacca Wanderers (1965–1966)

== Nigeria ==
- Abdullah Yaro - West Pakistan Universities (1964)
- Emeka Aliewa – Islamabad United (2007); Ravi FC (2010s)
- Akeem Abbas Olajuwon – Wohaib (2007–2008)
- Abayomi Oludeyi – K-Electric (2013–2016)
- Abayomi Wilson – K-Electric (2014–2019)

== Poland ==
- Janusz Wójcik – Rawalpindi Division (1976–1977)

== Footnotes ==
1. Born in Pakistan
