= Gnaruban Vinoth =

Sri Lankan footballer

Personal information
- Place of birth: Sri Lanka
- Position: Midfielder

Team information
- Current team: Solid

Senior career*
Years	Team	Apps	(Gls)
- Solid

International career^{‡}
	Sri Lanka	7	(0)
- * Club domestic league appearances and goals ‡ National team caps and goals as of 15 November 2016

Gnaruban Vinoth is a Sri Lankan international footballer who plays as a midfielder.
