= Hemanta Vincent Biswas =

Bangladeshi footballer

Hemanta Biswas
- Hemanta in 2015

Personal information
- Full name: Hemanta Vincent Biswas
- Date of birth: 13 December 1995 (age 30)
- Place of birth: Dinajpur, Bangladesh
- Height: 1.71 m (5 ft 7 1/2 in)
- Positions: Attacking midfielder; centre midfielder

Team information
- Current team: Dhaka Wanderers
- Number: 99

Youth career
- 2007–2011: BKSP

Senior career*
Years	Team	Apps	(Gls)
2011–2012	Friends SWO		
2013	Victoria		(0)
2013–2014	Mohammedan		(0)
2014–2015	Sheikh Russel		(3)
2015	→ Chittagong Abahani (loan)	0	(0)
2015–2016	Dhaka Abahani		(1)
2016	→ Sheikh Jamal (loan)	0	(0)
2017–2018	Saif	20	(1)
2018–2019	Bashundhara Kings	10	(0)
2019–2023	Sheikh Russel	65	(1)
2023–2024	Chittagong Abahani	10	(0)
2024–2025	Bangladesh Police	2	(0)
2026–	Dhaka Wanderers	5	(4)

International career
2013–2014	Bangladesh U20	2	(0)
2014–2017	Bangladesh U23	11	(0)
2014–2022	Bangladesh	21	(2)
- * Club domestic league appearances and goals as of 23 April 2026

Hemanta Vincent Biswas (Bengali: হেমন্ত ভিনসেন্ট বিশ্বাস; born 13 December 1995) is a Bangladeshi professional footballer who plays as a midfielder for Bangladesh Football League club Dhaka Wanderers.

In 2013, he trialed for the Dutch club FC Twente, becoming the first Bangladeshi footballer to get a trial at a top European club.

== Early life ==
Hemanta was born in Dinajpur, Bangladesh.

== Club career ==
=== Early career ===
Hemanta earned his football training from BKSP. Hemanta began his domestic career with Friends SWO in the Dhaka Second Division in 2011. He helped the club secure promotion to the Senior Division, finishing as runners-up. In 2013, he joined Victoria, competing in the second-tier Bangladesh Championship League.

In December 2013, following his performances as captain of the Bangladesh U20 team earlier that year, Hemanta was arranged a trial with Eredivisie club FC Twente by then-Bangladesh national team head coach Lodewijk de Kruif and assistant coach Rene Koster.

=== Mohammedan ===
Hemanta joined Mohammedan ahead of the 2013–14 season, making his debut in the top flight. He was part of the squad that won the 2013–14 Independence Cup, starting in the final against Feni, where Mohammedan won 5–4 on penalties following a goalless draw. During his debut season, he established himself in the team ahead of experienced players Emon Mahmud Babu and Mezbabul Haque Manik.

=== Sheikh Russel ===
Ahead of the 2014–15 season, Hemanta joined Sheikh Russel, scoring three league goals. However, a hamstring injury sustained during international duty ruled him out of the 2015 AFC Cup qualifying play-off. In the same year, he was loaned to Chittagong Abahani for the 2015 Sheikh Kamal International Club Cup in Chittagong. He scored the third goal in the final against India's East Bengal, helping Chittagong Abahani secure a 3–1 victory on 30 October 2015.

=== Dhaka Abahani ===
Hemanta joined Dhaka Abahani for the 2015–16 season, winning his first league title and the 2016 Federation Cup. He scored his only goal of the season in a 3–0 league victory over Mohammedan on 20 September 2016, playing as a striker in the Dhaka derby. However, injuries limited his playing time during the season. He was loaned to Sheikh Jamal for the 2016 AFC Cup, however, missed the campaign due to injury.

=== Saif ===
The following season, Hemanta joined newly promoted Saif SC for the 2017–18 season. He made 20 league appearances, scoring once in a 5–0 victory over Brothers Union on 26 August 2017. He also featured in both legs of the 2018 AFC Cup qualifying play-offs.

=== Bashundhara Kings ===
Hemanta joined newly promoted Bashundhara Kings for the 2018–19 season, winning his second league title despite making only 10 league appearances. He also won the 2018 Independence Cup with the club. In the semi-final against Dhaka Abahani, he converted his penalty in the shootout as Bashundhara Kings advanced with a 7–6 victory following a 1–1 draw.

=== Return to Sheikh Russel ===
Hemanta returned to Sheikh Russel the following season and remained at the club for four seasons, making 65 league appearances and scoring once. His only league goal during this spell came against Sheikh Jamal on 21 June 2022 in the 2021–22 season.

=== Later career ===
Following unsuccessful spells with Chittagong Abahani and Bangladesh Police, Hemanta joined second-tier Dhaka Wanderers during the mid-season transfer window, scoring four goals in five appearances in the 2025–26 BCL. The club subsequently secured promotion to the top flight, with Hemanta retained for the following season.

== International ==
=== Youth ===
Hemanta made his Bangladesh U20 debut as captain against hosts Iraq U20 during the 2014 AFC U-19 Championship qualification in 2013. In the following qualifying match, Bangladesh defeated Kuwait U20 1–0, with skipper Hemanta being sent off in the first half.

Hemanta made his Bangladesh U23 debut against Nepal U23 in an international friendly in 2014. Hemanta also participated in the 2014 Asian Games in South Korea. Prior to the tournament he also featured in a friendly against Vietnam U23 on 7 March 2015. He later participated in the 2018 AFC U-23 Championship qualification under head coach Andrew Ord.

=== Senior team ===
Hemanta made his debut for Bangladesh in a friendly against India in Goa on 5 March 2014. His dummy opened up space for Mithun Chowdhury to score the first goal and later his cross led to an own goal from Arnab Mondal as Bangladesh tied 2–2 with the hosts. His performance was heavily praised by coach Lodewijk de Kruif.

On 2 February 2015, Hemanta scored his first international goal against Sri Lanka in the 2015 Bangabandhu Cup final group stage game which helped Bangladesh qualify for the semi-finals. However, he missed the tournament final against Malaysia U23 due to an hamstring injury.

On 19 September 2015, Hemanta was suspended from the national team camp after participating in a local football match in his hometown of Dinajpur while recovering from a hamstring injury, without BFF's permission. He apologised to the federation but was initially barred from rejoining the camp pending a disciplinary decision ahead of the 2018 FIFA World Cup qualification – AFC second round match against Kyrgyzstan on 13 October, in which he eventually featured.

Hemanta was part of the Bangladesh team that lost 3–1 to Bhutan in the 2019 AFC Asian Cup qualification – play-off round on 10 October 2016, a result that left Bangladesh out of international football for more than a year. He was initially included in the squad assembled by newly appointed head coach Jamie Day for a two-week training camp in Qatar in February 2018 but was unable to travel due to illness.

Hemanta was recalled to the national team by newly appointed coach Javier Cabrera in March 2022 for international friendlies against Maldives and Mongolia, but withdrew from the training camp due to a thigh injury. He was recalled for the September FIFA international window and featured in a 3–1 defeat to Nepal on 27 September, making his first appearance for Bangladesh in six years.

== Career statistics ==
=== International ===
As of 27 September 2022.

Bangladesh
Year	Apps	Goals
2014	2	0
2015	14	2
2016	4	0
2022	1	0
Total	21	1

List of international goals scored by Hemanta Vincent Biswas
No.	Date	Venue	Opponent	Score	Result	Competition
1.	2 February 2015	Bangabandhu National Stadium, Dhaka, Bangladesh	Sri Lanka	1–0	1–0	2015 Bangabandhu Cup
2.	26 December 2015	Trivandrum International Stadium, Thiruvananthapuram, India	Maldives	1–1	1–3	2015 SAFF Championship

== Honours ==
Mohammedan

- Independence Cup: 2013–14

Chittagong Abahani

- Sheikh Kamal International Club Cup: 2015

Dhaka Abahani

- Bangladesh Premier League: 2015–16
- Federation Cup: 2016
