= Amredin Sharifi =

Afghan footballer

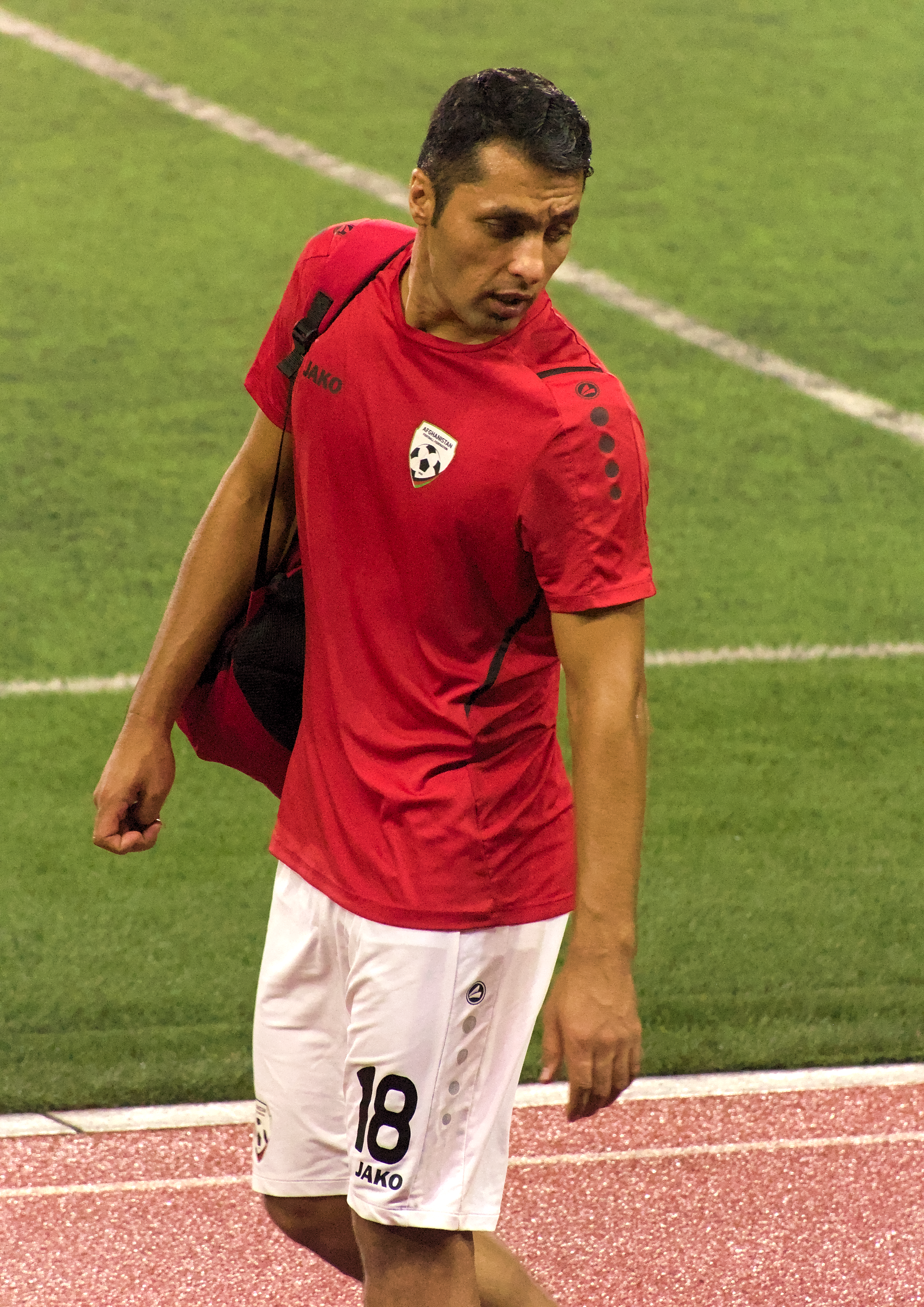

Personal information
- Full name: Amredin Mohammad Anwar Sharifi
- Date of birth: 2 June 1992 (age 34)
- Place of birth: Tehran, Iran
- Height: 1.85 m (6 ft 1 in)
- Position: Forward

Team information
- Current team: Neftchi Kochkor-Ata
- Number: 9

Senior career*
Years	Team	Apps	(Gls)
2013–2018	Shaheen Asmayee	10	(5)
2018–2019	Alay Osh		
2020–2021	Neftchi Kochkor-Ata	25	(15)
2021–2022	Bangladesh Police	17	(9)
2022–2023	Fortis	16	(4)
2024–	Neftchi Kochkor-Ata		

International career^{‡}
2013–	Afghanistan	29	(4)
Medal record
Men's football
Representing Afghanistan
SAFF Championship
Winner	2013 Nepal
- * Club domestic league appearances and goals as of 21 July 2023 ‡ National team caps and goals as of 21 November 2023

Amredin Mohammad Anwar Sharifi (Dari: امرالدين شریفی; born 2 June 1992) is a professional footballer who plays as a forward. He last played for Kyrgyz Premier League club Neftchi Kochkor-Ata. Born in Iran, he plays for the Afghanistan national team.

== Club career ==
=== Earlier career ===
He joined Shaheen Asmayee in 2013.

In 2017, Sharifi scored four goals in 2017 Sheikh Kamal International Club Cup, making him the top goalscorer in the competition.

=== Bangladesh Police ===
On 30 November 2021, Sharifi made his debut for Bangladesh Police against Chittagong Abahani during the 2021–22 Independence Cup group stage match. He scored his first goal for the club in the same competition against Sheikh Russel KC during the semifinals. On 7 March 2022, Sharifi scored a hattrick against newly promoted side Swadhinata KS, in the Bangladesh Premier League.

== International career ==
Sharifi was selected for the Afghanistan team for the 2014 AFC Challenge Cup in Maldives. They faced Philippines, Turkmenistan and Laos. He scored his first goal for the national team against Pakistan in a friendly match, on 6 February 2015, that ended in a 1–2 defeat.

=== International goals ===
Scores and results list Afghanistan's goal tally first.

No	Date	Venue	Opponent	Score	Result	Competition
1.	6 February 2015	Punjab Stadium, Lahore, Pakistan	Pakistan	1–1	1–2	Friendly
2.	25 May 2021	Jebel Ali Centre of Excellence, Dubai, United Arab Emirates	Indonesia	2–0	3–2	Friendly
3.	3 June 2021	Jassim Bin Hamad Stadium, Doha, Qatar	Bangladesh	1–0	1–1	2022 FIFA World Cup qualification
4.	16 November 2023	Khalifa International Stadium, Doha, Qatar	Qatar	1–1	1–8	2026 FIFA World Cup qualification

== Honours ==
Afghanistan

- SAFF Championship: 2013

Individual

- Sheikh Kamal International Club Cup Top Scorer: 2017
