= Chattogram Zila Krira Sangstha Swimming Complex =

Indoor swimming complex in Bangladesh

- Interactive map of Chattogram Zila Krira Sangstha Swimming Complex
- Location: Kazir Dewri, Chattogram, Bangladesh, 4000
- Coordinates: 22.3458°N 91.8257°E
- Owner: National Sports Council
- Operator: Chattogram Zila Krira Sangstha
- Type: Public

Construction
- Opened: 7am
- Closed: 8pm
- Cost: ৳11.62 crore (US$950,000)

Chattogram Zila Krira Sangstha Swimming Complex is a modern indoor swimming complex in outer stadium in Kazir Dewri, Chattogram, Bangladesh.

== Construction ==
Construction began in February 2017 and completed in November 2018 with an area over 1 acre (0.40 ha) of land at a cost of ৳11.62 crore (US$950,000), under the National Sports Council of Bangladesh.

On 12 October 2019, Chattogram City Corporation Mayor A J M Nasir Uddin announced that the facility would be known as Sheikh Russell Swimming Complex.
