= Abayomi Oludeyi =

Nigerian footballer (born 1993)

Personal information
- Full name: Abayomi Sunday Oludeyi
- Date of birth: 6 January 1993 (age 33)
- Place of birth: Lagos, Nigeria
- Position: Forward

Senior career*
Years	Team	Apps	(Gls)
2012–2013	Rivers United		
2013–2016	K-Electric	27	(12)
2017–2018	Cercle de Joachim		
2022	Garhwal Heroes		
2023–	FC Kerala		

International career
- Nigeria U23
- * Club domestic league appearances and goals

Abayomi Sunday Oludeyi (born 6 January 1993) is a Nigerian footballer who plays as a forward for Kerala Premier League club FC Kerala.

== Early and personal life ==
Oludeyi grew up in Lagos, attending Community Secondary School. He comes from a financially struggling family of seven, with his father retired and one of his brothers owning a small shop, with Oludeyi occasionally working at a church. Living in a rented house, his mother separated from her husband when Oludeyi was six months old. His parents have different religious backgrounds; his mother is a Muslim who went on Hajj in 2009–10, while his father is a Christian. Despite their differences, Oludeyi identifies as a Muslim and regularly engages in prayer.

== Club career ==
=== Early career ===
Oludeyi joined Golden Boys Academy in 2007 and later played for several clubs, including Oyo United. He then played at Rivers United. He also had a trial at the Dubai-based club Al-Ahli in 2012.

=== K-Electric ===
In November 2013, Pakistan Premier League club K-Electric announced the signing of Oludeyi, however he couldn't take part in a match against Khan Research Laboratories due to late arrival at night and some missing paperwork. He entered into the deal with the club through his agent and former Nigerian player Jay-Jay Okocha.

In December 2013, Oludeyi scored in his debut in the 2013–14 Pakistan Premier League in the 59th minute, in a 1–0 victory against Muslim FC at the KMC Stadium. He then scored a brace in the first half in a 4–0 victory over PIA which propelled the club to the top of the league table. He scored an opening goal via a penalty kick against WAPDA, in the eventual 1–2 defeat. He was sent off after a second yellow card in a match against Afghan Chaman. Oludeyi had represented the season runners-up K-Electric in 13 league matches after he was not issued a visa in time. He also participated in the 2014 NBP Challenge Cup, where he scored 4 goals in 5 matches, and was declared the best player of the tournament. He was also praised by local fans.

In August 2014, he renewed his contract, and was joined by fellow countryman Abayomi Wilson. In the next 2014–15 Pakistan Premier League, Oludeyi played a key role to guide K-Electric to their maiden title victory in the 11-year history of the league. He played 14 matches and scored 8 goals. He also played for K-Electric in the 2016 AFC Cup, scoring in a 1–0 victory against Bhutan club Khoromkhon.

"Sunday’s goal was instinctive… he showed exactly what he can do and the difference he can make to a game."

— Jay-Jay Okocha in an interview with Dawn after Oludeyi's performance against Khoromkhon FC.

He also played in the 2015 Sheikh Kamal International Club Cup, scoring a goal in the eventual 2–3 defeat against Abahani Limited Dhaka.

=== Cercle de Joachim ===
In 2017, Oludeyi signed for Mauritian club Cercle de Joachim SC.

=== Garhwal Heroes ===
Oludey represented Garhwal Heroes in the 2022–23 Delhi Premier League.

=== FC Kerala ===
Oludeyi later represented FC Kerala in the 2022–23 Kerala Premier League.

== International career ==
Oludeyi played for Nigeria national under-23 team at youth level. Since he didn't yet featured for his native country at senior level, in 2015 he expressed his interest to play for Pakistan if he was granted citizenship of the country.

== Honours ==
K-Electric

- Pakistan Premier League: 2014–15

=== Individual ===
- Best player: 2014 NBP Challenge Cup
