= Muhammad Riaz (footballer, born 1996) =

Pakistani footballer

Personal information
- Date of birth: 27 February 1996 (age 30)
- Place of birth: Landi Kotal, Pakistan
- Positions: Attacking midfielder; winger

Team information
- Current team: Mujahid FC
- Number: 10

Senior career*
Years	Team	Apps	(Gls)
2010–2020	K-Electric		
2014	→ Sui Southern Gas (loan)		
2020	Asia Ghee Mills		
2021	SA Gardens		
2021–2026	Hangu Union		
2026–	Mujahid FC		

International career
2013–2018	Pakistan U23	4	(0)
2013–2019	Pakistan	14	(2)
- * Club domestic league appearances and goals

Muhammad Riaz (Urdu, Pashto: محمد ریاض; born 27 February 1996) is a Pakistani footballer who plays as a midfielder for Khost Premier League club Mujahid FC. Although his favored position is that of an attacking midfielder, he can also be deployed as a striker or winger.

== Club career ==
=== Early career ===
In 2010, Riaz was selected through trials in Islamabad to represent Islamabad United in the Super Football League, a competition featuring city-based franchise teams assembled through regional selection trials. He was named player of the tournament, having featured in all nine of Islamabad United's matches.

=== K-Electric ===
He signed for Pakistan Premier League departmental side K-Electric in September 2010 at the age of 15 which was then playing at the Pakistan Premier League. He played for the club until the team got disbanded in 2020.

==== Loan to Sui Southern Gas ====
Riaz had a brief stint on loan at Sui Southern Gas in 2014.

=== Asia Ghee Mills ===
He represented Asia Ghee Mills in the departmental 2020 PFF Challenge Cup.

=== SA Gardens & Hangu Union ===
Following the suspension of the Pakistan Football Federation by FIFA and the persistent inactivity of the Pakistan Premier League, Riaz joined Lahore-based SA Gardens in 2021, participating in local tournaments in Peshawar and Chitral. He also played for his hometown club Hangu Union, where he helped organise local football tournaments.

=== Mujahid FC ===
In August 2026, Riaz joined Khost Premier League club Mujahid FC of Khost in Afghanistan.

== International career ==
Riaz's first senior appearance was against Afghanistan in 2013. He was subsequently called for the 2013 SAFF Championship.

Riaz appeared for Pakistan's U-23 team at the 2014 Asian Games in a 1–0 loss to the Chinese U-23 team. He scored his first goal on 6 February 2015, in a friendly against Afghanistan, scoring a header in the 18th minute. In 2015, he was part of the Pakistan squad for test matches against Malaysia under-19 and under-22 in Kuala Lumpur, where he scored against both teams in a 3–1 victory and 1–2 loss respectively. In May 2015, he was included in the 2018 FIFA World Cup qualification against Yemen.

Riaz missed international exposure for the next 3 years, as Pakistan was suspended from all football activities by FIFA on 10 October 2017 on account of "undue third-party interference". For three years since March 2015, Pakistan remained suspended from any international competition because of the crisis created inside the Pakistan Football Federation. Riaz along with other national team players meanwhile participated with Pakistan during local Leisure Leagues exhibitions matches involving Brazilian star Ronaldinho and Ryan Giggs in 2017.

In 2018, Riaz participated in Pakistan tour to Bahrain for test matches as a preparation for the 2018 SAFF Championship, when his national side returned to international circuit after 3 years. Riaz made three further appearances in the 2018 Asian Games. He scored in the 2018 SAFF Championship against Bhutan, as Pakistan terminated the campaign sealing its place in the semi-finals.

In 2019, Riaz played in the 2022 World Cup qualification against Cambodia playing as a left-back, as Pakistan failed to qualify for the next round. This was before Pakistan were once again suspended from all football activities by FIFA on 7 April 2021. After the suspension was lifted on 29 June 2022, Riaz was called in the national camp in February 2023, as preparation for future tournaments. However, he was unable to secure a spot in the final squad in March 2023.

== Personal life ==
Riaz was born in Landi Kotal in the Khyber Agency of Pakistan. His family originates from Hesar Shahi, in the Rodat District of Nangarhar Province in Afghanistan. He received his education through the 12th grade at an Afghan-run school.

On 9 March 2025, due to the long standing crisis within the Pakistan Football Federation and lack of domestic football in the country, Riaz was reported being forced to sell jalebis to meet his ends. The media coverage sparked widespread criticism, and Riaz reportedly received an invitation at the Prime Minister of Pakistan House three days later. It was also reported that he received financial assistance and job positions from the Prime Minister Shehbaz Sharif, the Chief Minister of Khyber Pakhtunkhwa Ali Amin Gandapur, and from a stakeholder of an aspiring franchise-based football league.

In June 2026, Riaz's brother, Mirwais commonly known as Mero Pathan, also a footballer, was deported from Pakistan to Afghanistan.

== Career statistics ==
=== International ===
As of match played 6 June 2019

Appearances and goals by national team and year
National team	Year	Apps	Goals
Pakistan	2013	4	0
Pakistan	2014	1	0
Pakistan	2015	3	1
Pakistan	2018	4	1
Pakistan	2019	2	0
Total		14	2

Scores and results list Pakistan's goal tally first, score column indicates score after each Riaz goal.

List of international goals scored by Muhammad Riaz
No.	Date	Venue	Opponent	Score	Result	Competition
1	6 February 2015	Ghazi Stadium, Kabul, Afghanistan	Afghanistan	1–0	2–1	Friendly
2	8 September 2018	Bangabandhu National Stadium, Dhaka, Bangladesh	Bhutan	1–0	3–0	2018 SAFF Championship
