= Subodh Kumar =

Indian footballer (born 1990)

Personal information
- Date of birth: 10 June 1990 (age 36)
- Place of birth: India
- Height: 1.66 m (5 ft 5 in)
- Position: Defender

Team information
- Current team: BSS

Youth career
- –2010: East Bengal

Senior career*
Years	Team	Apps	(Gls)
2010–2015	East Bengal	19	(0)
2010–2011	→ Pailan Arrows (loan)	1	(1)
2016–2017	Ozone	4	(0)
2021–2022	Corbett	3	(0)
2022–	BSS	4	(0)

International career
2010	India U23		
- * Club domestic league appearances and goals

Subodh Kumar (born 10 June 1990) is an Indian football player who last plays for CFL Premier A club BSS. Talented mid-field player with great speed and endurance. An introvert player who believes in attacking football. Expert in free kicks with outstanding ball control. Member of the Gold Medal-winning team at SAF Cup – Dhaka. Also represented the country in AFC U-19 at Iran, U-23 SAF Games at Dhaka and the U-19 team exposure trip to Germany.2010 played again games in China Guangzhou lost with Japan. Get awarded from Jharkhand ratna .

== Club career ==
=== Indian Arrows ===
After spending years in the East Bengal F.C. youth system Kumar moved to new side Indian Arrows for the 2010-11 I-League season. He scored his only goal for Arrows during his only appearance for the club on 29 January 2011 against Viva Kerala FC in the I-League.

=== East Bengal ===
After spending one great season at Arrows, Kumar moved back to his former club East Bengal. He made his debut for East Bengal against Mumbai F.C. on 2 November 2011.

Before the 2015–16 season, it was announced that Kumar had been released by East Bengal.

== Career statistics ==
=== Club ===
Statistics accurate as of 13 September 2013 2012

Club	Season	League		Federation Cup		Other		AFC		Total	
Club	Season	Apps	Goals	Apps	Goals	Apps	Goals	Apps	Goals	Apps	Goals
Pailan Arrows	2010–11	1	1	0	0	0	0	—	—	1	1
East Bengal	2011–12	5	0	0	0	0	0	0	0	5	0
East Bengal	2012–13	1	0	2	0	0	0	0	0	3	0
East Bengal	2013-14	0	0	0	0	2	0	0	0	2	0
Career total		7	1	2	0	2	0	0	0	11	1

== Honours ==
India U23

- SAFF Championship: 2009
