= Eleta Kingsley =

Bangladesh international footballer (born 1989)

Personal information
- Full name: Eleta Kingsley Oshiokha
- Date of birth: 29 October 1989 (age 37)
- Place of birth: Ogbona, Nigeria
- Height: 1.83 m (6 ft 0 in)
- Position: Forward

Team information
- Current team: Brothers Union
- Number: 10

Youth career
- Nigerian Ports Authority FC

Senior career*
Years	Team	Apps	(Gls)
2004–2005	Gabros International FC		
2005–2006	Dolphin		
2006–2007	Kwara United		
2007–2008	Gateway United		
2008–2009	Gabros International FC		
2009–2011	Akwa United	10	(9)
2011–2012	Arambagh KS	11	(8)
2012–2013	Team BJMC	8	(4)
2013–2014	Muktijoddha Sangsad	6	(5)
2015	Chittagong Abahani	0	(0)
2015–2019	Team BJMC	29+	(23)
2019	→ Bashundhara Kings (loan)	0	(0)
2019–2020	Arambagh KS	5	(6)
2020–2022	Bashundhara Kings	21	(9)
2022–2023	Dhaka Abahani	14	(8)
2023	Chittagong Muktijoddha Sangsad	2	(0)
2024–	Brothers Union	17	(5)

International career^{‡}
2023	Bangladesh	2	(0)
- * Club domestic league appearances and goals as of 29 May 2025 ‡ National team caps and goals as of 28 March 2023

Eleta Kingsley Oshiokha (Bengali: এলিটা কিংসলে; born 29 October 1989) is a professional footballer who plays as a forward for Bangladesh Premier League club Brothers Union. Born in Nigeria, he represented Bangladesh at international level.

== Early life ==
Kingsley started his football career at an early age, enrolling in Nigerian academies. He played youth football with Nigerian Ports Authority FC.

== Club career ==
Kingsley began his senior career with Nigeria club Gabros International FC. Afterwards, he played for Dolphin FC. From 2009 to 2011, he played for Nigerian club Akwa United F.C.

Afterwards, he left Nigeria and went to Uzbekistan, but due to work permit issues and other complications, he had to leave that country, ultimately heading to Bangladesh on the advice of a friend. He played in a match between foreigners and national team players, impressing and receiving offers from many top Bangladeshi clubs such as Abahani Limited Dhaka and Sheikh Jamal DC, but instead signed for Arambagh KS as he had made a prior commitment to them. He scored a hat trick in his first Bangladesh Premier League match in 2012 against Sheikh Jamal DC.

In 2012, Kingsley signed for Team BJMC.

In 2013, he joined Muktijoddha Sangsad KC.

In 2015, he played with Chittagong Abahani in the 2015 Sheikh Kamal International Club Cup, winning the tournament and finishing as top scorer with 5 goals, and earning the man of the match award in the final, as well as Tournament Most Valuable Player.

Afterwards, he returned to Team BJMC, staying with the club through 2019. In a 2016 Independence Cup match, he scored 5 goals in a 6–0 victory over Feni Soccer Club. He went on a brief loan for a few days in 2019 to Bashundhara Kings.

In 2019, he returned to Arambagh KS.

In 2021, he signed for the Bashundhara Kings. On 18 May 2022, he made his AFC Cup debut against Maziya as a naturalized.

In 2022, he signed for Dhaka Abahani.

In 2023, he played with Chittagong-based Muktijoddha Sangsad KC in the Chittagong Football League, but was released after playing two matches.

In March 2024, Kingsley signed with Brothers Union. On 30 March, he scored in his debut for Brothers Union, in a loss to the Bashundhara Kings.

== International career ==
Eligible for the Nigeria national team by birth, Kingsley obtained Bangladeshi citizenship in 2021, through naturalization, becoming the first foreign footballer to obtain a Bangladeshi passport. He was named to the preliminary squad for the Bangladesh national team for the 2021 SAFF Championship, but was unable to represent the team due to not obtaining the clearance from FIFA in time to be eligible. In March 2023, he was named to the provisional squad ahead of a set of friendlies. He appeared in an unofficial friendly for Bangladesh on 15 March 2023 against Malawi. He made his official debut in a substitute appearance on 25 March against Seychelles.

== Personal life ==
Born in Nigeria, Kingsley lives in Bashundhara Residential Area with his Bangladeshi wife Liza, whom he married in May 2012. The couple has a daughter named Safira. He applied for Bangladeshi citizenship in 2014, with it being granted in 2021.

== Career statistics ==
As of match played 22 August 2023

Appearances and goals by club, season and competition
Club	Season	League			National cup		Other cup		Continental		Total	
Club	Season	Division	Apps	Goals	Apps	Goals	Apps	Goals	Apps	Goals	Apps	Goals
Team BJMC	2017–18	Bangladesh Premier League	18	8	—		—		—		18	8
Team BJMC	2018–19	Bangladesh Premier League	11	3	—		—		—		11	3
Arambagh KS	2020	Bangladesh Premier League	5	6	—		—		—		5	6
Bashundhara Kings	2021	Bangladesh Premier League	9	3	—		—		—		9	3
Bashundhara Kings	2022	Bangladesh Premier League	9	6	—		—		2	0	11	6
Dhaka Abahani	2022–23	Bangladesh Premier League	14	8	—		—		0	0	14	8
Career total			66	34	0	0	0	0	2	0	68	34

== Honours ==
Chittagong Abahani

- Sheikh Kamal International Club Cup: 2015

Individual

- Sheikh Kamal International Club Cup Top Scorer: 2015
- Independence Cup Top Scorer: 2016
