= Abayomi Wilson =

Nigerian footballer

Personal information
- Full name: Abayomi Segun Wilson
- Date of birth: 8 November 1995 (age 31)
- Place of birth: Lagos, Nigeria
- Positions: Midfielder; winger

Team information
- Current team: SK Spēks

Youth career
- Dolphin

Senior career*
Years	Team	Apps	(Gls)
2014–2019	K-Electric	36	(3)
2021–	SK Spēks		
- * Club domestic league appearances and goals

Abayomi Segun Wilson (born 8 November 1995) is a Nigerian footballer who plays as a midfielder for Latvian Second League club SK Spēks.

== Club career ==
=== K-Electric ===
In August 2014, K-Electric announced the signing of Wilson, while the club also renewed the contract of another Nigerian striker Abayomi Oludeyi, who was signed the previous year. He entered into the deal with the club through his agent and former Nigerian player Jay-Jay Okocha, who had also been involved in the contract of Oludeyi with K-Electric last year.

He made his debut for K-Electric in the 2014 NBP Challenge Cup. He made his league debut in the 2014-15 Pakistan Premier League, and played a key role to guide K-Electric to their maiden title victory in the 11-year history of the league. He played thirteen matches and scored one goal. He also played for K-Electric in the 2016 AFC Cup. He also played in the 2015 Sheikh Kamal International Club Cup. Abayomi also played the 2018-19 Pakistan Premier League. He made 20 appearances and scored two goals, and impressed against Khan Research Laboratories.

=== SK Spēks ===
In 2021, Wilson signed for Latvian Second League club SK Spēks.

== International career ==
Wilson played for Nigeria under-17 and under-19 team at youth level.

== Honours ==
K-Electric

- Pakistan Premier League: 2014–15
