= Sheikh Kamal International Club Cup =

International club football tournament held in Bangladesh

- Founded: 2015; 11 years ago
- Teams: 8
- Current champions: (Malaysia) Terengganu (1st title)
- Most championships: (Bangladesh) Chittagong Abahani (Maldives) TC Sports Club (Malaysia) Terengganu
- Broadcaster(s): Bangla TV; Channel Nine

Sheikh Kamal International Club Cup (Bengali: শেখ কামাল আন্তর্জাতিক ক্লাব কাপ), also known as Sheikh Kamal Gold Cup, is a biennial international club football tournament held in Bangladesh. The inaugural edition took place in 2015. It is hosted by the Chittagong Abahani in association with the Bangladesh Football Federation. The tournament is held in the M. A. Aziz Stadium, in the port city of Chittagong.

Eight clubs from eleven countries participate in the tournament.

== Tournament summaries ==
Year	Final			Semi-finals
Year	Champion	Score	Second Place	Semi-finalist	Semi-finalist
2015	(Bangladesh); Chittagong Abahani	3–1	(India); East Bengal	(Afghanistan); De Spin Ghar Bazan	(Bangladesh); Mohammedan Dhaka
2017	(Maldives); TC Sports Club	2–2; 4–2 (p)	(South Korea); Pocheon Citizen	(Nepal); Manang Marshyangdi	(Bangladesh); Chittagong Abahani
2019	(Malaysia); Terengganu	2–1	(Bangladesh); Chittagong Abahani	(India); Gokulam Kerala	(India); Mohun Bagan
2021	Not held (Note: The 2021 edition didn't happen due to COVID-19 pandemic in Bangladesh)
2022	Not held
2023	Not held
2024	Not held
2025	Not held

== Participating teams ==
19 different clubs from 11 countries have participated in the tournament.

† Bold year represents the champion of that year.

SL	Team	Participation Year	Country	League
1	(Bangladesh) Chittagong Abahani	2015, 2017, 2019	Bangladesh	Bangladesh Premier League
2	(Maldives) TC Sports Club	2017, 2019	Maldives	Dhivehi Premier League
3	(Bangladesh) Dhaka Abahani	2015, 2017	Bangladesh	Bangladesh Premier League
4	(Bangladesh) Dhaka Mohammedan	2015, 2017	Bangladesh	Bangladesh Premier League
5	(Bangladesh) Bashundhara Kings FC	2019	Bangladesh	Bangladesh Premier League
6	(India) Kolkata Mohammedan	2015	India	I-League 2
7	(India) East Bengal FC	2015	India	I-League
8	(India) Chennai City FC	2019	India	I-League
9	(India) Gokulam Kerala FC	2019	India	I-League
10	(India) Mohun Bagan AC	2019	India	I-League, CFL
11	(Pakistan) K-Electric F.C.	2015	Pakistan	Pakistan Premier League
12	(Sri Lanka) Solid SC	2015	Sri Lanka	Sri Lanka Premier League
13	(Afghanistan) De Spin Ghar Bazan F.C.	2015	Afghanistan	Afghan Premier League
14	(Afghanistan) Shaheen Asmayee F.C.	2017	Afghanistan	Afghan Premier League
15	(South Korea) FC Pocheon	2017	South Korea	K3 League Advanced
16	(Kyrgyzstan) FC Alga Bishkek	2017	Kyrgyzstan	Kyrgyzstan League
17	(Nepal) Manang Marshyangdi Club	2017	Nepal	Martyr's Memorial A-Division League
18	(Malaysia) Terengganu FC	2019	Malaysia	Malaysia Super League
19	(Laos) Young Elephants FC	2019	Laos	Lao Premier League

== Statistics ==
=== All-time top scorers ===
Rank	Name	Club	Years	Goals
1	(England) Lee Tuck	Terengganu FC	2019	6
2	(Bangladesh) Eleta Kingsley	Chittagong Abahani, Bashundhara Kings	2015, 2019	5
3	(Afghanistan) Amredin Sharifi	Shaheen Asmayee F.C.	2017	4
3	(Bangladesh) Zahid Hossain	Chittagong Abahani	2015	4
3	(Pakistan) Muhammad Rasool	K-Electric F.C.	2015	4
3	(Brazil) (Japan) Bruno Suzuki	Terengganu FC	2019	4
3	(Uganda) Henry Kisekka	Gokulam Kerala F.C.	2019	4
3	(Nigeria) Matthew Chinedu	Chittagong Abahani	2019	4

=== Top scorers by edition ===
Year	Player(s)	Club	Goals
2015	(Bangladesh) Eleta Kingsley	Chittagong Abahani	5
2017	(Afghanistan) Amredin Sharifi	Shaheen Asmayee F.C.	4
2019	(England) Lee Tuck	Terengganu F.C.	6
