= Wali Faisal =

Bangladeshi footballer

Personal information
- Full name: Md. Wali Faisal
- Date of birth: 1 March 1985 (age 41)
- Place of birth: Narayanganj, Bangladesh
- Height: 1.71 m (5 ft 7 1/2 in)
- Position: Left-back

Senior career*
Years	Team	Apps	(Gls)
2001–2009	Dhaka Abahani		
2009–2010	Mohammedan SC		
2010–2011	Sheikh Jamal DC		
2011–2015	Dhaka Abahani		
2015–2016	Sheikh Russel KC		
2016–2021	Dhaka Abahani	53	(0)
2021–2022	Rahmatganj MFS	12	(0)
2022–2023	Mohammedan SC	0	(0)

International career
2006–2018	Bangladesh	48	(0)
Medal record
Representing Bangladesh U-23
South Asian Games
Gold medal – first place	2010
- * Club domestic league appearances and goals

Wali Faisal (Bengali: ওয়ালী ফয়সাল; born 1 March 1985) is a retired Bangladeshi international footballer who played as a defender. He played for the Bangladesh national football team from 2006 to 2018.

== Early life ==
Wali was born at Narayanganj, one of the oldest cities in Bangladesh, in 1985. While he was in 3rd and 4th grade in school, he produced great performance for his district team and attracted interest from both Abahani-Mohammedan. He traveled to Dhaka to watch league games of his maternal uncle Abdullah Parbez, who was a player of Team BJMC. Faisal was introduced to and participated in sports in the supervision of Abdullah.

== Club career ==
Despite the family reluctance, Wali was very attracted to his football career. Wali's academy coach Azmal Khandakar was impressed by his football skills. Seeing his playing style, late Monem Munna, ex captain of both the Bangladesh National football team and Abahani Limited, was impressed and invited him to play in the junior team of Abahani Limited Dhaka.
