= Bello Razaq =

Former Nigerian footballer (born 1984)

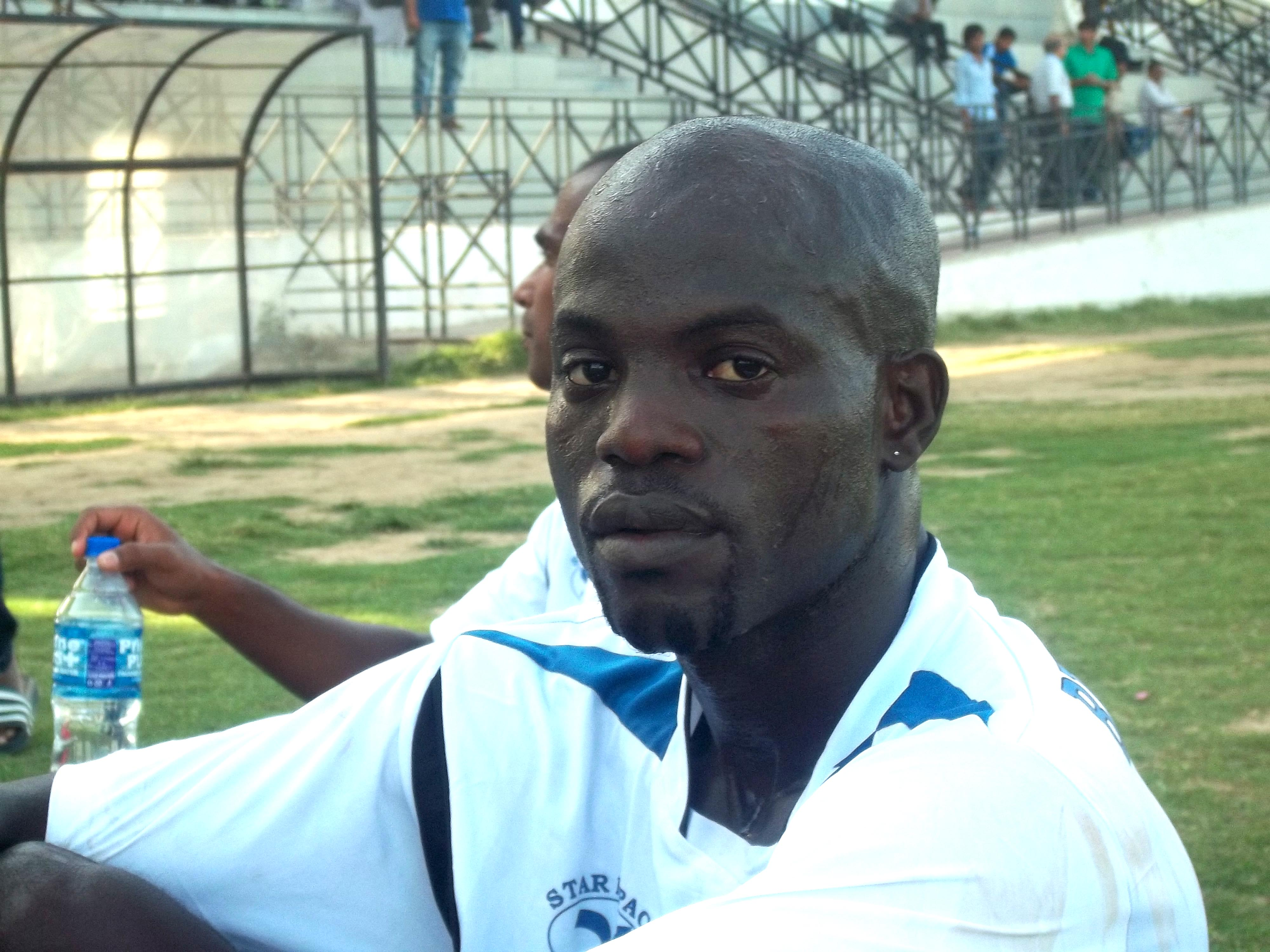

Personal information
- Full name: Rasaq Oladimeji Bello
- Date of birth: 19 August 1984 (age 42)
- Place of birth: Nigeria
- Height: 1.74 m (5 ft 9 in)
- Position: Centre-back

Team information
- Current team: Aryan

Senior career*
Years	Team	Apps	(Gls)
2001–2002	Fransa-Pax		
2002–2005	Salgaocar		
2006	Fransa-Pax		
2007	Sporting Goa		
2008	Mahindra United		
2009–2012	Chirag United Kerala		
2012–2014	United SC	45	(4)
2014	Tollygunge Agragami	8	(1)
2014–2015	Mohun Bagan	20	(1)
2015–2016	East Bengal	16	(1)
2017	Gokulam FC	4	(1)
2018	Aryan	3	(0)

International career
1998	Nigeria U17	1	(0)
- * Club domestic league appearances and goals as of 23:02, 20 August 2018 (UTC)

Rasaq Oladimeji Bello (born 19 August 1984) is a former Nigerian professional footballer, who last played for Aryan as a centre-back in the Calcutta Football League.

== Career ==
Razaq played for Viva Kerala and Mahindra United before heading towards United SC of Kolkata.

He first established himself in Indian football while playing for United SC. He contributed a lot to the success of United SC during 2012–14. The high point of, which came in 2012 when the club lifted the IFA Shield by defeating East Bengal 1–0. United Sports Club has been under severe financial constraint in 2013–14 and Bello along with the other team mates, decided to carry on for the sake of the team. They practically played without salary for most of the season and saved relegation in the 2013–14 I league. For the 2014–15 season, Bello joined in Mohun Bagan and played a key role in Mohun Bagan's i-League triumph. Bello scored his first goal for Mohun Bagan in the last fixture of the 2014–15 I-League season against Bengaluru FC. His header only three minutes from time handed Mohun Bagan their fourth national league title. For 2015–16 season, he switched over to the other Kolkata giant East Bengal F.C., the main rival of Mohun Bagan. In 2018, he appeared with Aryan.

== Honours ==
Mohun Bagan

- I-League: 2014–15
