= Orok Essien =

Nigerian professional footballer

Orok Orok Essien
Personal information
- Date of birth: 25 January 1992 (age 34)
- Place of birth: Lagos, Nigeria
- Height: 1.87 m (6 ft 2 in)
- Position: Forward

Youth career
- Mozico FC

Senior career*
Years	Team	Apps	(Gls)
	Calabar Rovers	4	(1)
	Anantigha Warriors	8	(5)
	Anambra United	21	(17)
2011–2012	→ Kenkre (loan)	19	(16)
2012–2013	George Telegraph	22	(17)
2013–2014	Mumbai	21	(11)
2014–2015	East Bengal	19	(9)
2015–2016	Karbi Anglong Morning Star	11	(23)
2015–2016	Viva Chennai	14	(21)
2016–2017	Bhawanipore	20	(11)
2018–2019	Paro	10	(8)
2021	Aryan	8	(5)

International career
2012–2013	Nigeria U23	4	(2)
- * Club domestic league appearances and goals

Orok Orok Essien (born 25 January 1992) is a Nigerian professional footballer who plays as a forward. He spent most of his career in India, alongside representing the Nigeria U23.

== Career ==
=== Early career ===
As a youth, Orok played for Audu Babes and Mozico. He then went on to play for amateur clubs Calabar Rover, Anantigha Warriors, and Anambra United. He then went on a short loan to Kenkre F.C. in the I-League 2nd Division in India before playing for George Telegraph in West Bengal.

=== Mumbai ===
On 20 September 2013 it was announced that Essien had signed for Mumbai F.C. of the Indian I-League for the 2013–14 season. He then made his professional debut for the side the next day on 21 September against Sporting Goa in which he started and played the whole match as Mumbai drew 1–1.

=== Aryan ===
Later, Essien was loaned out to CFL club Aryan.

== Career statistics ==
As of 21 September 2013

Club	Season	League			Federation Cup		Durand Cup		AFC		Total	
Club	Season	Division	Apps	Goals	Apps	Goals	Apps	Goals	Apps	Goals	Apps	Goals
Mumbai	2013–14	I-League	6	3	2	1	—	—	0	0	8	4
Mumbai	Career total		6	3	2	1	-	-	0	0	8	4
