= Solid SC =

Sri Lankan football club

Solid
- Full name: Solid Sports Club
- Founded: 1983; 43 years ago
- Ground: Prison Ground, Anuradhapura
- Capacity: 2,000
- League: Sri Lanka Champions League
Home colours	Away colours	Third colours

Solid Sports Club is a Sri Lankan professional football club based in the Anuradhapura in the Anuradhapura District. Founded in 1983, the team plays in Sri Lanka Champions League, the second division of domestic football.

== Achievements ==
- 2014–15 Sri Lanka Football Premier League, Champion
- 2013 Sri Lanka Premier League, Semifinal Play Off

== League participations ==
- Sri Lanka Premier League: 2013–present
- Kit Premier League Division I: ??–2012

== Stadium ==
Currently the team plays at the 2,000-capacity Prison Ground.
