= District Stadium, Chittagong =

Sports stadium in Bangladesh

Coordinates: 22°21′21″N 91°46′04″E

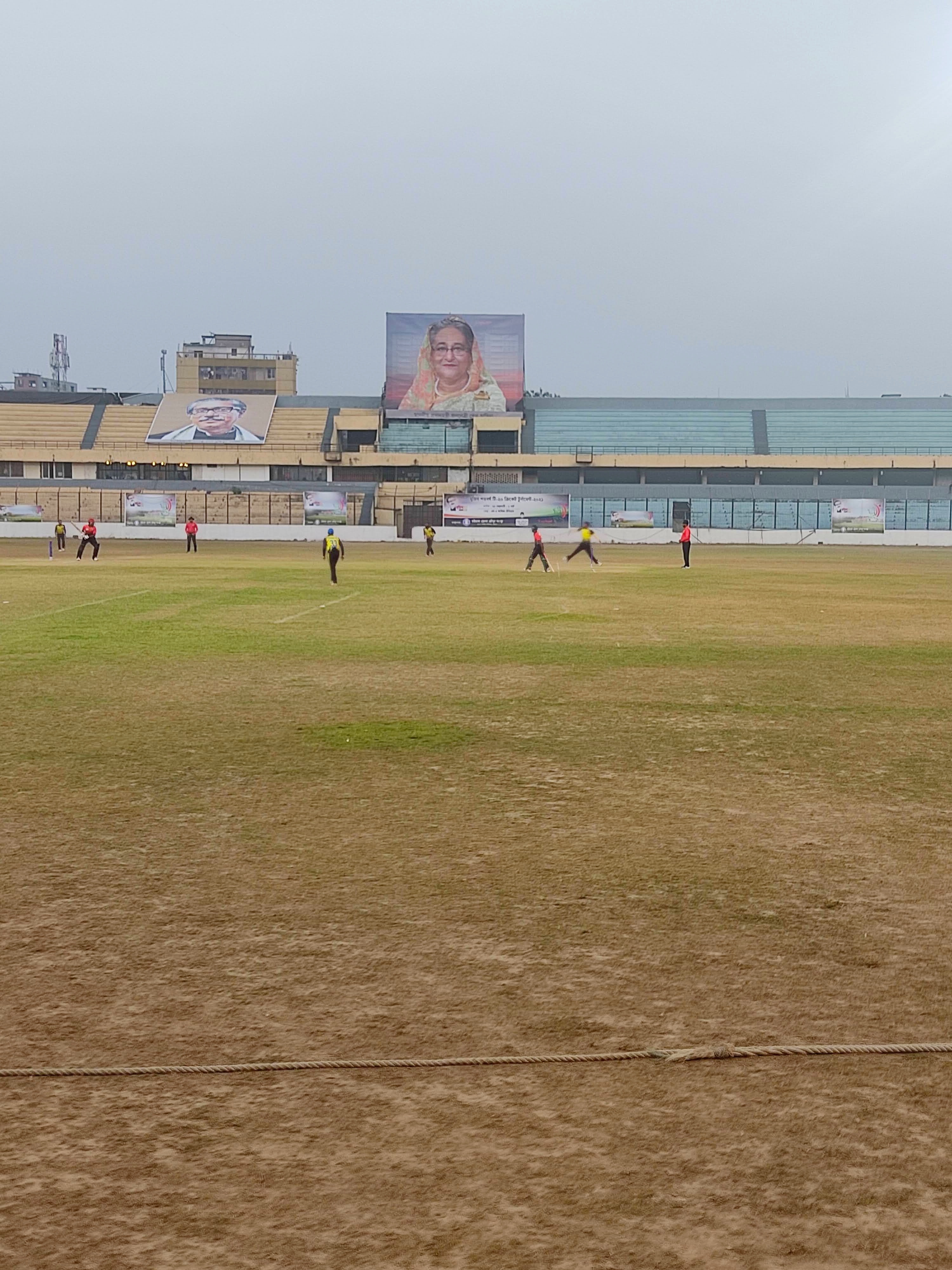
- during the local cricket match at District Stadium, Chittagong
- Interactive map of District Stadium, Chittagong

Ground information
- Location: Chittagong
- Country: Bangladesh
- Establishment: 1 January 1955
- Capacity: 40,000
- Owner: National Sports Council
- Operator: Bangladesh Football Federation
- Tenants: Chittagong Abahani (Football)
- End names
- Pedrollo End; Ispahani End

International information
- First men's Test: 15–19 November 2001: Bangladesh v Zimbabwe
- Last men's Test: 6–10 January 2005: Bangladesh v Zimbabwe
- First men's ODI: 27 October 1988: Bangladesh v India
- Last men's ODI: 26 January 2005: Bangladesh v Zimbabwe

District Stadium, Chittagong (Bengali: জেলা স্টেডিয়াম, চট্টগ্রাম), officially known as MA Aziz Stadium and formerly known as Niaz Stadium, is a multi-purpose stadium in Chittagong, Bangladesh. The stadium currently operated by the Bangladesh Football Federation, predominantly hosts football matches and has previously been used by the Bangladesh national football team. Its total capacity is 40,000.

On a historical note, it was used as headquarters during the 1971 Independence War. The stadium serves as the main football venue of Chittagong as the main cricket venue of the port city has been shifted to the Bir Shrestho Flight Lieutenant Matiur Rahman Cricket Stadium. It is the home venue of Chittagong Abahani in Bangladesh Premier League. The stadium also hosts the Sheikh Kamal International Club Cup, the country's only international club football tournament.

== History ==
On 1 January 1955 Indian team led by Vinoo Mankad came to play in the newly built stadium. Their opponents were East Pakistan Sports Federation. Then the stadium was called Niaz Stadium, after the name of District Administrator of that time who helped to build it. Then the name of the mountain covered area was Jongli Polton. Later it was changed. After the Mankad's team the stadium welcomed Donald Carr of MCC. MCC also came once more after the war of liberation. In 1976–77 the name of the stadium was changed to Chattagram Jilla Krira Porishod (Chittagong District Sports Organization) stadium. It was under the PG of that district.

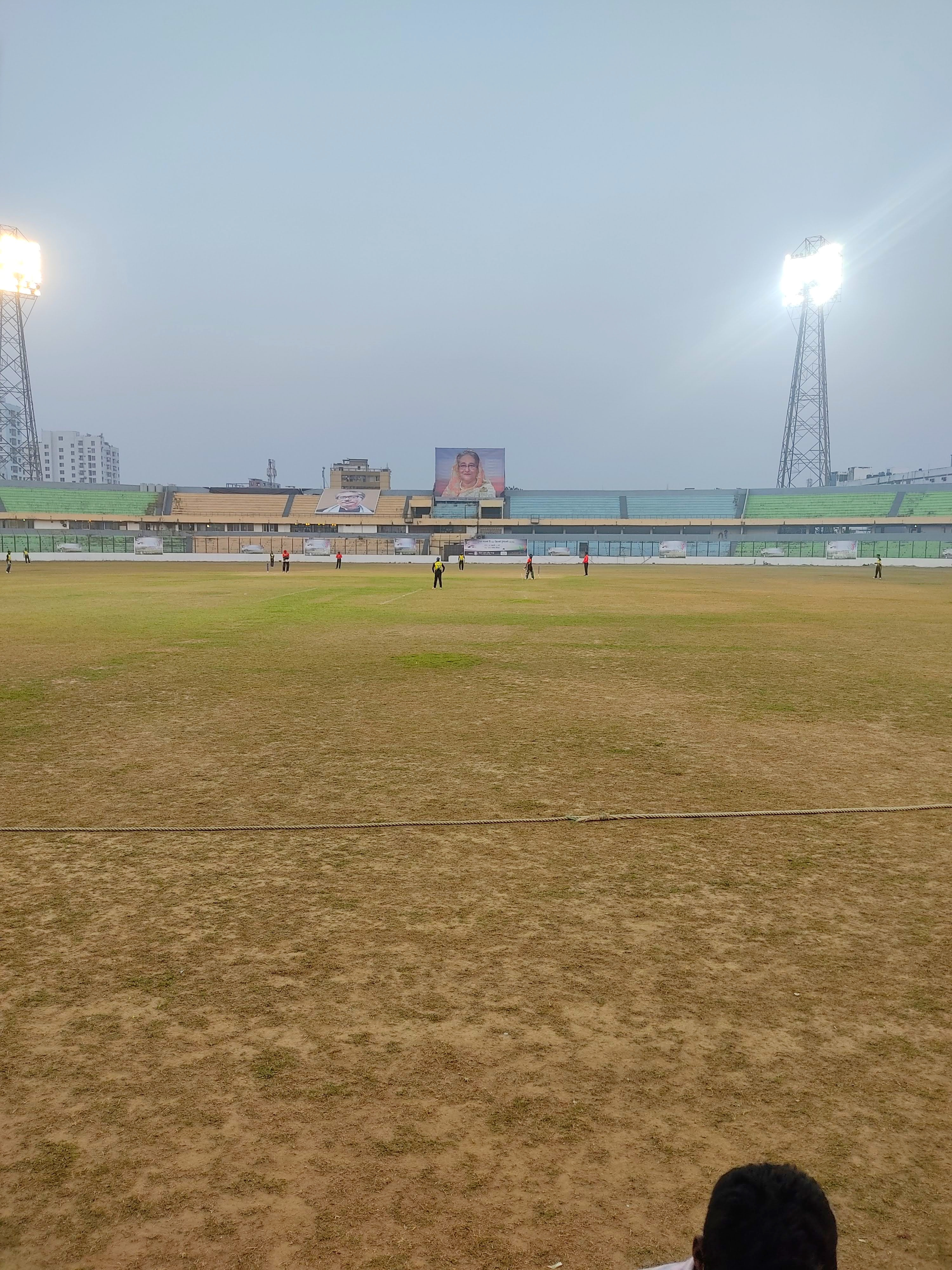
during the local match at M.A. Aziz Stadium

The stadium became the centre of Chittagong's sports over the years. In 1957–58 Chittagong Commerce College met Jogonnath College at the final of the Inter College Cricket. Chittagong team was runners up. At the outer part of the stadium Star Jubo and Star Summer tournaments were also held. East Bengal also came to play. In the 1980s cricket started to be influenced by Asgar, Abedin and Ispahani family. Many of the National Team cricketers like Minhajul Abedin, Akram Khan, Shaheedur Rahman and Nurul Abedin started their careers here. Later tournaments like Star Jubo and Star Summer had stopped.

The first One Day International (ODI) took place back on 27 October 1988 during the 1988 Asia Cup. Bangladesh's opponent was India and Pakistan in those two matches. Bangladesh lost the matches by 9 wickets and 173 runs respectively. Bangladesh played 7 Tests and 8 ODIs so far at this ground. The stadium made a debut as the 82nd test venue on 15 November 2001 with the Test match between Bangladesh and Zimbabwe.

The venue has also hosted group stage matches of 2004 and 2016 Under-19 Cricket World Cup matches.

The stadium is the main football venue of port city, it hosted matches during the 2006 AFC Challenge Cup and is also a regular venue for the Chittagong Football League. On 2 January 2025, the National Sports Council leased the stadium to the Bangladesh Football Federation for 25 years.

In 2025, the interim government of Bangladesh renamed the stadium as District Stadium, Chittagong.

== Stats and records ==
The venue has hosted

- Test Matches – 23
- One Day International – 25
- T20I – 22
- The venue hosted 1st ever International ODI match in Bangladesh in 1988. The match was between Bangladesh vs India.
- The venue became only 2nd test venue in Bangladesh in 2005. The first being Bangabandhu National Stadium.
- In January 2005, when Zimbabwe national cricket team toured to Bangladesh, In the first test Bangladesh won their first ever test match in their 35 test match at this venue. Bangladesh defeated Zimbabwe by 226 runs.

== BPL 2013 ==
After a long time the M. A. Aziz Stadium hosted cricket matches of the second edition of Bangladesh Premier League, along with Sher-e-Bangla Stadium in Dhaka and Sheikh Abu Naser Stadium in Khulna. Home team Chittagong Kings played 4 matches here. 10 matches were played from 25 January to 2 February 2013.

28 January
14:00
Scorecard

Chittagong Kings; 172/6 (20 overs)	v	Sylhet Royals; 176/7 (19.3 overs)
Naeem Islam 72 (52); Sohag Gazi 2/21 (3.1 overs)		Mohammad Nabi 43 (26); Kevon Cooper 3/21 (4 overs)

Sylhet Royals won by 3 wickets
M. A. Aziz Stadium, Chittagong
Umpires: Jeremy Lloyds (Eng) and Tanvir Ahmed (Ban)
Player of the match: Mohammad Nabi (Sylhet Royals)

- Sylhet Royals won the toss and elected to field

28 January
18:00 (D/N)
Scorecard

Duronto Rajshahi; 213/6 (20 overs)	v	Barisal Burners; 209/7 (20 overs)
Tamim Iqbal 66 (47); Alok Kapali 3/23 (4 overs)		Azhar Mahmood 54 (28); Abul Hasan 2/43 (4 overs)

Duronto Rajshahi won by 4 runs
M. A. Aziz Stadium, Chittagong
Umpires: Anisur Rahman (Ban) and Gazi Sohel (Ban)
Player of the match: Charles Coventry (Duronto Rajshahi)

- Duronto Rajshahi won the toss and elected to bat

29 January
14:00
Scorecard

Dhaka Gladiators; 158/5 (20 overs)	v	Sylhet Royals; 127/8 (20 overs)
Darren Stevens 55* (35); Mominul Haque 1/18 (2 overs)		Mushfiqur Rahim 41 (37); Alfonso Thomas 2/12 (4 overs)

Dhaka Gladiators won by 31 runs
M. A. Aziz Stadium, Chittagong
Umpires: Jeremy Lloyds (Eng) and Masudur Rahman (Ban)
Player of the match: Darren Stevens (Dhaka Gladiators)

- Sylhet Royals won the toss and elected to field

29 January
18:00 (D/N)
Scorecard

Rangpur Riders; 122 (20 overs)	v	Khulna Royal Bengals; 89 (18.4 overs)
Kevin O' Brien 24 (30); Daniel Harris 3/22 (4 overs)		Asif Ahmed 19 (18); Fidel Edwards 4/11 (3.4 overs)

Rangpur Riders won by 33 runs
M. A. Aziz Stadium, Chittagong
Umpires: Anisur Rahman (Ban) and Mahfuzur Rahman (Ban)
Player of the match: Fidel Edwards (Rangpur Riders)

- Rangpur Riders won the toss and elected to bat

31 January
14:00
Scorecard

Sylhet Royals; 126 (19.3 overs)	v	Rangpur Riders; 122 (19.3 overs)
Nazmul Hossain Milon 45; Nasir Hossain 2/19 (4 overs)		Shamsur Rahman 52 (46); Sohag Gazi 3/20 (4 overs)

Sylhet Royals won by 5 wickets
M. A. Aziz Stadium, Chittagong
Umpires: Jeremy Lloyds (Eng) and Tanvir Ahmed (Ban)
Player of the match: Nazmul Hossain Milon (Sylhet Royals)

- Sylhet Royals won the toss and elected to field

31 January
18:00 (D/N)
Scorecard

Barisal Burners; 182/5 (20 overs)	v	Chittagong Kings; 176/6 (20 overs)
Sabbir Rahman 40 (27); Kevon Cooper 2/27 (4 overs)		Brendan Taylor 51 (42); Elias Sunny 3/24 (4 overs)

Barisal Burners won by 6 runs
M. A. Aziz Stadium, Chittagong
Umpires: Anisur Rahman (Ban) and Tanvir Ahmed (Ban)
Player of the match: Azhar Mahmood (Barisal Burners)

- Barisal Burners won the toss and elected to bat

1 February
14:30
Scorecard

Dhaka Gladiators; 137/5 (20 overs)	v	Duronto Rajshahi; 124/9 (20 overs)
Owais Shah 43 (40); Taijul Islam 2/24 (4 overs)		Tamim Iqbal 33 (18); Mosharraf Hossain 2/17 (4 overs)

Dhaka Gladiators won by 13 runs
M. A. Aziz Stadium, Chittagong
Umpires: Jeremy Lloyds (Eng) and Gazi Sohel (Ban)
Player of the match: Alfonso Thomas (Dhaka Gladiators

- Dhaka Gladiators won the toss and elected to bat

1 February
18:30 (D/N)
Scorecard

Chittagong Kings; 137/2 (18 overs)	v	Khulna Royal Bengals; 136/5 (20 overs)
Brendan Taylor 69 (49); Sanjamul Islam 1/26 (4 overs)		Riki Wessels 35 (32); Enamul Haque Jr. 3/28 (4 overs)

Chittagong Kings won by 8 wickets
M. A. Aziz Stadium, Chittagong
Umpires: Mahfuzur Rahman (Ban) and Masudur Rahman (Ban)
Player of the match: Brendan Taylor (Chittagong Kings)

- Chittagong Kings won the toss and elected to field

2 February
14:30
Scorecard

Barisal Burners; 152/6 (20 overs)	v	Duronto Rajshahi; 153/6 (19.4 overs)
Azhar Mahmood 57 (34); Dilshan Munaweera 2/18 (4 overs)		Jahurul Islam 57 (38); Azhar Mahmood 2/20 (4 overs)

Duronto Rajshahi won by 4 wickets
M. A. Aziz Stadium, Chittagong
Umpires: Jeremy Lloyds (Eng) and Gazi Sohel (Ban)
Player of the match: Jahurul Islam (Duronto Rajshahi)

- Barisal Burners won the toss and elected to bat

2 February
19:30 (D/N)
Scorecard

Dhaka Gladiators; 88/8 (20 overs)	v	Chittagong Kings; 142 (20 overs)
Mohammad Ashraful 33 (48); Jacob Oram 2/7 (4 overs)		Naeem Islam 50 (38); Alfonso Thomas 2/11 (4 overs)

Chittagong Kings won by 54 runs
M. A. Aziz Stadium, Chittagong
Umpires: Mahfuzur Rahman (Ban) and Masudur Rahman (Ban)
Player of the match: Naeem Islam (Chittagong Kings)

- Dhaka Gladiators won the toss and elected to field

== Outer Stadium ==
Immediately east of MA Aziz Stadium lies Outer Stadium. Owned by the Bangladesh Army, it is on a 99-year lease to the Chittagong District Sports Association (Chattagram Jila Krira Sangstha or CJKS). By 2012, Outer Stadium was almost never being used for sports, instead being used to host various fairs. The Chattogram Zila Krira Sangstha Swimming Complex opened in 2019 on one acre of the site. In 2020, only one corner of the remaining ground could be used for batting and bowling practice. The rest of the field was described by bdnews24.com as an overgrown, waterlogged dump, "unusable for sports" because of chronic neglect and lack of maintenance.

== See also ==
- Stadiums in Bangladesh
- List of football stadiums in Bangladesh
- List of international cricket grounds in Bangladesh
