= Mumbai Premier League =

Mumbai Football League top tier

- Organising body: Mumbai Football Association (MFA)
- Founded: 1902; 124 years ago
- Country: India
- Number of clubs: 20
- Level on pyramid: 2
- Promotion to: Maharashtra State Senior Menʼs Football League
- Relegation to: Mumbai Super League
- League cup(s): Nadkarni Cup; Harwood League
- Current champions: India On Track FC
- Most championships: Tata Sports Club; Mahindra United FC (13 titles each)
- Website: Mumbai Premier League
- Current: 2025–26 Mumbai Premier League

Mumbai Premier League, formerly known as the MFA Elite Division or MDFA Elite Division, is the second tier of the Mumbai Football League competition. In March 2022, the Mumbai Premier League was rechristened as the Harwood Premier League, on the lines of the name that was once associated with the Mumbai's top division football stretching back to 1902. Most matches are played at Neville D'Souza Football Turf in Bandra.

== Clubs (2024) ==
2023–24 Mumbai Premier League teams

Teams	Location
Ambernath United–Bombay Muslims	Ambernath
Ambernath United–Bombay Muslims	Mumbai Central
Mighty Young Joe–Goalorious Mother	Malad
Mighty Young Joe–Goalorious Mother	Borivali
PIFA Colaba	Colaba
Maharashtra Oranje	Powai
Community Football Club India (CFCI)	Dahisar
Hope United (Karnataka Sports Association)	Churchgate
Sellebrity	Bandra
Mumbai Kenkre	Mahim
Millat FC	Jogeshwari
DK Pharma	Badlapur
Mumbai Knights (JMJ Sports)	Bandra
Silver Innings (Protrack)	Mira Road
Iron Born–Rudra	Andheri
Kalina Rangers CFF	Santacruz
Reliance FYC	Navi Mumbai
ICL Payyade Mumbai FC	Borivali

== Champions ==
Season	Champions	Note
1902	(United Kingdom) Oxfordshire Light Infantry	
1903	(United Kingdom) Royal Garrison Artillery	
1904	(United Kingdom) Cheshire Regiment	
1905	(United Kingdom) Yorkshire Regiment	
1906	(United Kingdom) Royal Scots	
1907	(United Kingdom) Royal Scots	
1908	(United Kingdom) Royal Scots	
1909	(United Kingdom) Gloucestershire Regiment	
1910	(United Kingdom) Royal Garrison Artillery	
1911	(United Kingdom) Royal Warwickshire Regiment	
1912	(British Raj) Royal Army Temperance Association	
1913	(United Kingdom) Sherwood Foresters	
1914	(United Kingdom) Sherwood Foresters	
1915	(United Kingdom) Royal Garrison Artillery	
1916–1920	None	Not held
1921	(United Kingdom) King's Shropshire Light Infantry	
1922	(United Kingdom) King's Shropshire Light Infantry	
1923	(United Kingdom) Royal Inniskilling Fusiliers	
1924	(United Kingdom) West Yorkshire Regiment	
1925	(United Kingdom) West Yorkshire Regiment	
1926	(United Kingdom) South Staffordshire Regiment	
1927	(United Kingdom) Cheshire Regiment	
1928	(United Kingdom) Royal Ulster Rifles	
1929	(United Kingdom) Royal Warwickshire Regiment	
1930	(United Kingdom) Duke of Wellington's Regiment	
1931	(United Kingdom) Duke of Wellington's Regiment	
1932	(United Kingdom) King's Own Scottish Borderers	
1933	(United Kingdom) Royal Irish Fusiliers	
1934	(British Raj) Royal Artillery (Colaba)	
1935	(United Kingdom) Durham Light Infantry	
1936	(United Kingdom) Durham Light Infantry	
1937	(United Kingdom) Cheshire Regiment	
1938	(United Kingdom) Cheshire Regiment	
1939	(United Kingdom) South Lancashire Regiment	
1940	(United Kingdom) Welch Regiment	
1941	(British Raj) Y.M.C.A.	
1942	(British Raj) Western India Automobile Association Staff	First native club to win the league.
1943	(British Raj) Western India Automobile Association Staff	
1944	(British Raj) Embarkation Headquarters	
1945	(British Raj) Tata Sports Club	
1946	(British Raj) Trades India Sports Club	
1947	Trades India Sports Club	
1948	Tata Sports Club	
1949	Trades India Sports Club	
1950	Tata Sports Club	
1951	India Culture League	
1952	India Culture League	
1953	Tata Sports Club	
1954	Indian Navy	
1955	None	
1956	Burmah-Shell Sports Club	
1957	Indian Navy	
1958	Tata Sports Club	
1959	Western Railway SC	
1960	Tata Sports Club	
1961	Tata Sports Club	
1962	Western Railway SC	
1963	Central Railway	
1964	Tata Sports Club	
1965	Central Railway	
1966	Tata Sports Club	
1967	Tata Sports Club	
1968	Mafatlal Group	
1969	Mafatlal Group	
1970	Mahindra & Mahindra	
1971	Mafatlal Group	
1972	Mafatlal Group	
1973	Tata Sports Club	
1974–75	Tata Sports Club	
1975–76	Mafatlal Group	
1976	Mafatlal Group	
1977	Orkay Mills	
1978–79	Mafatlal Group	
1979	Tata Sports Club	
1980	Orkay Mills	
1981	Century Rayon FC	
1982	Mahindra & Mahindra	
1983	Mafatlal Mills	
1984	Mahindra & Mahindra	
1985	Mahindra & Mahindra	
1986	Bank of India (Mumbai)	
1987	Rashtriya Chemicals and Fertilizers	
1988	Orkay Mills	
1989	Union Bank of India	
1990	Rashtriya Chemicals and Fertilizers	
1991	United Boys (Sahar)	
1992	Central Railway	
1993	ONGC	
1994	Carmelites SC	
1995	Central Railway	
1996	Royal Caterers	
1997	Abandoned	
1998	Village Amboli	
1999	unknown (Holy Family/Chembur English/Rhino)	
2000	Mahindra United	
2001–02	Mahindra United	
2002	Mahindra United	
2003	Mahindra United	
2004	Mahindra United	
2005	Maharashtra State Police	
2006–07	Mahindra United	
2007–08	Mahindra United	
2008–09	Mahindra United	
2009–10	Air India	
2010–11	Mumbai	
2011–12	ONGC	
2012–13	None	
2013–14	Air India	
2014–15	Air India	
2015–16	ONGC	
2016–17	Air India	
2017–18	ONGC	
2018–19	Mumbai Customs	
2019–20	Karnataka Sporting Association	
2020–21	Cancelled due to COVID-19	
2021–22	Ambernath United Atlanta	
2022–23	Ambernath United Atlanta	
2023–24	MYJ–GMSC	
2024–25	India On Track	
