= 2022–23 MFA Elite Division =

MFA Elite Division
- Season: 2022–23
- Champions: Ambernath United Atlanta (2nd title)
- Matches: 120
- Goals: 467 (3.89 per match)
- Top goalscorer: Arif Shaikh (22)
- Longest winning run: Ambernath United Atlanta (12)
- Longest unbeaten run: Ambernath United Atlanta (15)
- All statistics correct as of 22 March 2023.

The 2022–23 MFA Elite Division was the 110th season of the MFA Elite Division, the top-tier football league in Mumbai, a city in the Indian state of Maharashtra.

Ambernath United Atlanta are the defending champions.

== Stadiums ==
Matches were played at the Neville D’Souza Football Turf in Bandra.

== Teams ==
Sixteen teams are participating in the 2022–23 edition of the MFA Elite Division.

=== Changes ===
▲ from 2021 Super Division	▼ to 2022 Super Division
Protrack SC; Rudra FC	Bombay Gymkhana FC; FSI Seaview; Salsette FC; Companeroes

2022-2023 MFA Elite Premier League Teams

Premier League	Location
Ambernath United Atlanta	Mira Road
GMSC	Borivali
PIFA FC	Colaba
Maharashtra Oranje	Powai
Iron Born CFCI	Dahisar
India Rush	Santacruz
Karnataka Sports Association	Churchgate
Bombay Muslims	Mumbai Central
Sellebrity	Bandra
Mumbai Kenkre	Mahim
Millat FC	Bandra
DK Pharma	Badlapur
Mumbai Strikers	Mulund
JMJ Sports (Mumbai Knights)	Bandra
Protrack (Silver Innings)	Mira Road
Rudra	Andheri

Corporate League	Location
Mumbai Customs	Santacruz
Income Tax	Churchgate
Century Rayon	Churchgate
Air India FC	Vile Parle
Union Bank	Nariman Point
HDFC Bank	Churchgate
Bank of Baroda	Bandra
Reserve Bank of India	Ballard Estate
Central Railway	Fort
Bank of India	Bandra
Western Railway	Churchgate
ESIC	Lower Parel
Maharashtra Police	Colaba

== League table ==
=== Elite Premier League ===
Pos	Team	Pld	W	D	L	GF	GA	GD	Pts	Qualification
1	Ambernath United Atlanta	15	14	1	0	68	8	+60	43	Champions
2	Karnataka Sports Association	15	12	2	1	66	12	+54	38	Harwood Champions League (Note: Since the club represents Karnataka, it is not eligible for 2023–24 I-League 3)
3	Millat FC	15	12	1	2	51	14	+37	37	2023–24 I-League 3 and Harwood Champions League
4	Maharashtra Oranje	15	10	2	3	44	15	+29	32	2023–24 I-League 2 and Harwood Champions League (Note: In September 2023, Oranje FC took over current champions Ambernath United Atlanta FC. Hence, they will compete as Maharashtra Oranje FC in 2023–24 I-League 2 and Harwood Champions League)
5	DK Pharma	15	10	2	3	46	21	+25	32	
6	JMJ Sports	15	8	5	2	27	11	+16	29	
7	GMSC	15	7	1	7	25	26	−1	22	
8	PIFA	15	6	3	6	23	32	−9	21	
9	Mumbai Kenkre	15	5	4	6	23	29	−6	19	
10	Sellebrity	15	5	3	7	13	28	−15	18	
11	Protrack	15	4	2	9	19	52	−33	14	
12	Iron Born CFCI	15	4	1	10	12	25	−13	13	
13	Bombay Muslims	15	3	1	11	12	32	−20	10	
14	Rudra	15	3	1	11	19	66	−47	10	
15	Mumbai Strikers	15	1	1	13	6	36	−30	4	Relegation to MFA Super Premier League
16	India Rush	15	1	0	14	13	60	−47	3	Relegation to MFA Super Premier League

Source: MFA Elite Premier League
Rules for classification: 1) points; 2) goal difference; 3) number of goals scored

=== Elite Corporate League ===
Pos	Team	Pld	W	D	L	GF	GA	GD	Pts	Qualification
1	Air India FC	11	10	1	0	34	4	+30	31	Corporate League Champions and Harwood Champions League qualification
2	Century Rayon	11	8	2	1	27	12	+15	26	Harwood Champions League
3	Bank of Baroda	11	6	3	2	24	9	+15	21	Harwood Champions League
4	Union Bank	11	6	2	3	19	14	+5	20	
5	Mumbai Customs	11	6	1	4	22	11	+11	19	
6	HDFC Bank	11	6	0	5	19	13	+6	18	
7	Income Tax	11	4	1	6	12	24	−12	13	
8	Reserve Bank of India	11	4	0	7	10	16	−6	12	
9	Western Railway	11	3	1	7	16	27	−11	10	
10	Central Bank of India	11	2	3	6	12	15	−3	9	
11	Central Railway	11	2	0	9	12	21	−9	6	
12	ESIC	11	2	0	9	9	50	−41	6	
13	Maharashtra Police	0	0	0	0	0	0	0	0	Relegation to MFA Super Corporate League
14	Bank of India	0	0	0	0	0	0	0	0	Relegation to MFA Super Corporate League

Source: Mumbai Football The Away End
Rules for classification: 1) points; 2) goal difference; 3) number of goals scored

== Harwood Champions League ==
Pos	Team	Pld	W	D	L	GF	GA	GD	Pts	Qualification
1	Maharashtra Oranje	0	0	0	0	0	0	0	0	Harwood Champions League Winners
2	Karnataka Sports Association	0	0	0	0	0	0	0	0	
3	Millat FC	0	0	0	0	0	0	0	0	
4	Air India FC	0	0	0	0	0	0	0	0	
5	Century Rayon	0	0	0	0	0	0	0	0	
6	Bank of Baroda	0	0	0	0	0	0	0	0	

Updated to match(es) played on 22 March 2023. Source: Mumbai Football
Rules for classification: 1) points; 2) goal difference; 3) number of goals scored

== See also ==
- 2021–22 MFA Elite Division
- 2022–23 in Indian football
- 2022–23 I-League 2nd Division
