= 2021–22 MFA Elite Division =

MFA Elite Division
- Season: 2021–22
- Champions: Ambernath United Atlanta (1st title)
- Top goalscorer: Alister Anthony (21)
- Longest winning run: Ambernath United Atlanta (17)
- Longest unbeaten run: Ambernath United Atlanta (17)
- Longest winless run: Companeroes (17)
- Longest losing run: Companeroes

The 2021–22 MFA Elite Division was the 109th season of the MFA Elite Division, the top-tier football league in Mumbai, a city in the Indian state of Maharashtra. The 2020–21 season was called off due to the COVID-19 pandemic. The league format was restructured in 2018–19 season and two groups were formed. In 2021, the groups were renamed the MFA Elite Premier League and MFA Elite Corporate League.

Aaditya Thackeray was re-elected president of the Mumbai Football Association.

Mumbai City FC is considered Mumbai's premier club, having participated in the 2021–22 Indian Super League season and the 2022 AFC Champions League, while Kenkre FC was Mumbai's representative at the 2021–22 I-League. However, Mumbai City hasn't competed in the MFA Elite League since 2019 when their U-18 team was suspended for assaulting the assistant referee.

Karnatak Sports Association were the champions of the 2019–20 MFA Elite Division.

== Format ==
The MFA Elite Division consists of two parallel leagues, the MFA Elite Premier League and the MFA Elite Corporate League. This season, the Elite Premier League has 18 teams while the Elite Corporate League has 14. Only the teams from the MFA Elite Premier League are considered for promotion to the I-League 2nd Division.

In the League stage, teams from their respective leagues play each other once. The teams finishing at the top of their respective league are crowned winners.

The winners and the next two teams from each league qualify for the Harwood Champions League where they will play each other once in a joint league. The leaders will be declared the champions. This tournament is expected to run from the 27th June to 11th July at the Cooperage Ground, Mumbai.

== Stadiums ==
Matches were played at the Cooperage Ground in Nariman Point, Neville D’Souza Football Turf in Bandra, and Mumbai Football Arena in Andheri.

== Teams ==
MFA Elite Premier League Teams

Premier League	Location
Ambernath United Atlanta FC	Mira Road
GMSC	Borivali
PIFA FC	Colaba
The Oranje FC (ICL Payyade SC)	Powai
Iron Born CFCI	Dahisar
India Rush RSF	Santacruz
Karnataka Sports Association	Churchgate
Bombay Muslims SC	Mumbai Central
Sellebrity	Bandra
Kenkre FC	Mahim
Millat FC	Bandra
DK Pharma FC	Badlapur
Mumbai Strikers	Mulund
JMJ Sports Club	Bandra
FSI Seaview	Nerul
Bombay Gymkhana	Fort
Salsette FC	Thane
Companeroes	Bandra

Corporate League	Location
Mumbai Customs	Santacruz
Income Tax	Churchgate
Century Rayon	Churchgate
Air India FC	Vile Parle
Union Bank	Nariman Point
HDFC Bank	Churchgate
Bank of Baroda	Bandra
Reserve Bank of India	Ballard Estate
Central Railway	Fort
Bank of India	Bandra
Western Railway	Churchgate
ESIC	Lower Parel
Central Bank of India	Ballard Estate
Maharashtra Police	Colaba

== League table ==
=== Elite Premier League ===
Pos	Team	Pld	W	D	L	GF	GA	GD	Pts	Qualification
1	Ambernath United Atlanta FC	17	17	0	0	77	6	+71	51	Champions, Harwood Champions League, and possible qualification for the 2022–23 I-League 2
2	Karnatak Sports Association	17	10	4	3	50	21	+29	34	Harwood Champions League and possible qualification for the 2022–23 I-League 2
3	PIFA FC	17	10	4	3	45	19	+26	34	Harwood Champions League
4	The Oranje FC (ICL Payyade SC)	17	10	2	5	36	14	+22	32	
5	Iron Born CFCI	17	9	5	3	31	10	+21	32	
6	GMSC	17	10	1	6	34	24	+10	31	
7	Kenkre FC	17	8	4	5	36	24	+12	28	
8	India Rush RSF	17	8	4	5	25	16	+9	28	
9	Bombay Muslims SC	17	8	3	6	21	26	−5	27	
10	Sellebrity	17	8	1	8	41	32	+9	25	
11	DK Pharma FC	17	7	4	6	21	18	+3	25	
12	Millat FC	17	8	0	9	35	29	+6	24	
13	Mumbai Strikers	17	5	3	9	18	42	−24	18	
14	JMJ Sports Club	17	3	4	10	22	41	−19	13	
15	Bombay Gymkhana FC	17	3	3	11	20	45	−25	12	Relegation to MFA Super Division
16	FSI Seaview	17	3	2	12	15	51	−36	11	Relegation to MFA Super Division
17	Salsette FC	17	2	3	12	12	41	−29	9	Relegation to MFA Super Division
18	Companeroes	17	0	1	16	13	92	−79	1	Relegation to MFA Super Division

Source: MFA Elite Premier League Football Counter
Rules for classification: 1) points; 2) goal difference; 3) number of goals scored

=== Elite Corporate League ===
Pos	Team	Pld	W	D	L	GF	GA	GD	Pts	Qualification
1	Bank of Baroda	12	9	1	2	35	10	+25	28	Corporate League Champions and Harwood Champions League qualification
2	Income Tax	12	9	1	2	28	18	+10	28	Harwood Champions League
3	Mumbai Customs	12	8	3	1	36	14	+22	27	Harwood Champions League
4	Union Bank	13	7	3	3	23	24	−1	24	
5	HDFC Bank	13	5	8	0	33	11	+22	23	
6	Air India FC	12	6	3	3	27	19	+8	21	
7	Reserve Bank of India	12	5	2	5	16	11	+5	17	
8	Central Bank of India	7	5	1	1	27	8	+19	16	
9	Bank of India	11	4	2	5	17	21	−4	14	
10	Central Railway	12	3	3	6	16	21	−5	12	
11	Century Rayon	12	2	4	6	9	21	−12	10	
12	Maharashtra Police	11	2	1	8	12	21	−9	7	
13	Western Railway	11	0	2	9	7	31	−24	2	
14	ESIC	11	0	1	10	11	51	−40	1	

Updated to match(es) played on 26 June 2022. Source: MFA Elite Corporate League Football Counter
Rules for classification: 1) points; 2) goal difference; 3) number of goals scored

== Harwood Champions League ==
Pos	Team	Pld	W	D	L	GF	GA	GD	Pts	Qualification
1	Ambernath United Atlanta FC	5	4	1	0	10	3	+7	13	Harwood Champions League Winners
2	Bank of Baroda	5	3	1	1	8	6	+2	10	
3	Karnatak Sports Association	5	1	2	2	10	10	0	5	
4	PIFA FC	5	1	2	2	3	5	−2	5	
5	Income Tax	5	0	3	2	5	8	−3	3	
6	Mumbai Customs	5	0	3	2	3	7	−4	3	

Source: Mumbai Football Association Football Counter
Rules for classification: 1) points; 2) goal difference; 3) number of goals scored

== See also ==
- 2018–19 MDFA Elite Division
- 2021–22 season in state football leagues of India
- 2022–23 I-League 2nd Division
