= 2018–19 MDFA Elite Division =

MDFA Elite Division
- Season: 2018–19
- Champions: Mumbai Customs (1st title)
- All statistics correct as of 5 May 2019.

The 2018–19 MDFA Elite Division is the 106th season of the MDFA Elite Division, the top-tier football league in Mumbai, a city in the Indian state of Maharashtra. ONGC F.C. were the defending champions. The league will commence on 1 September 2018.

== Restructured ==
The 106th season of the MDFA Elite Division has been restructured. The league will be played between 26 teams (highest no. of teams ever) which will be divided into two groups. Group A contains public sector clubs, and Group B contains privately owned clubs. This decision was taken after the failure of private clubs who were not able to finish top 3 in the league table due to which clubs were not allowed entry into the I-League 2nd Division, another reason was the public sector clubs commitment for company tournaments due to which there were matches which got postponed, delaying the league further. The table standings of Group B will be considered for the upcoming seasons of I-League 2nd Division.

== Format ==
The league will be played in two stages: the Preliminary and the Playoffs. There will be 13 teams, each in two groups. In the Preliminary round, the teams will play against each other only once. After the completion of the Preliminary round, the top 3 teams from both groups will advance to the Playoffs.

== League table ==
Group A

Pos	Team	Pld	W	D	L	GF	GA	GD	Pts	Qualification or relegation
1	ONGC	11	10	1	0	33	7	+26	31	
2	Air India	11	7	3	1	29	9	+20	24	Advance to playoffs
3	Mumbai Customs	11	6	1	4	23	15	+8	19	Advance to playoffs
4	Central Bank	11	5	3	3	17	15	+2	18	Advance to playoffs
5	HDFC	11	5	2	4	13	11	+2	17	Advance to playoffs
6	Western Railway	11	4	3	4	18	14	+4	15	
7	Dena Bank	11	5	0	6	13	27	−14	15	
8	Union Bank	11	4	2	5	10	8	+2	14	
9	Century Rayon	11	3	3	5	14	18	−4	12	
10	Central Railway	11	2	4	5	16	26	−10	10	
11	Bank Of India	11	1	3	7	15	28	−13	6	
12	Maharashtra State Police	11	1	1	9	8	31	−23	4	

Updated to match(es) played on 30 April 2019. Source: To Be Updated Soon
Rules for classification: 1) points; 2) goal difference; 3) number of goals scored

Group B

Pos	Team	Pld	W	D	L	GF	GA	GD	Pts	Qualification or relegation
1	Karnatak Sporting	13	10	3	0	54	0	+54	33	Advance to playoffs
2	Kenkre	14	11	1	2	48	15	+33	34	Advance to playoffs
3	U Mumba FC	14	9	3	2	50	16	+34	30	Advance to playoffs
4	GMSC	13	9	0	4	24	13	+11	27	Advance to playoffs
5	Community Football Club Of India	14	8	1	5	27	13	+14	25	
6	Millat FC	13	5	6	2	34	16	+18	21	
7	Bombay Gymkhana	12	6	5	1	26	22	+4	23	
8	Mumbai Strikers S.C	14	5	3	6	21	20	+1	18	
9	Companeros	13	5	2	6	24	13	+11	17	
10	Sea Views	13	4	3	6	21	21	0	15	
11	Selebrity	12	4	0	8	18	43	−25	12	
12	PIFA	14	3	3	8	14	31	−17	12	
13	Salcette	12	3	2	7	11	27	−16	11	
14	Mumbai Muslims	14	2	1	11	16	56	−40	7	
15	Rhema SC	13	0	1	12	6	70	−64	1	

Updated to match(es) played on 30 April 2019. Source: To Be Updated Soon
Rules for classification: 1) points; 2) goal difference; 3) number of goals scored

== Playoffs ==
=== Group stage ===
Group A

Pos	Team	Pld	W	D	L	GF	GA	GD	Pts	Qualification or relegation
1	Central Bank	3	3	0	0	9	0	+9	9	Semifinals
2	Air India	3	2	0	1	6	2	+4	6	Semifinals
3	Kenkre	3	1	0	2	9	10	−1	3	
4	GMSC	3	0	0	3	1	13	−12	0	

Updated to match(es) played on 30 April 2019. Source: To Be Updated Soon
Rules for classification: 1) points; 2) goal difference; 3) number of goals scored

Group B

Pos	Team	Pld	W	D	L	GF	GA	GD	Pts	Qualification or relegation
1	U Mumba FC	3	1	2	0	3	2	+1	5	Semifinals
2	Mumbai Customs	3	1	1	1	2	2	0	4	Semifinals
3	Karnatak Sporting	3	1	1	1	4	0	+4	4	
4	HDFC	3	0	2	1	1	3	−2	2	

Updated to match(es) played on 30 April 2019. Source: To Be Updated Soon
Rules for classification: 1) points; 2) goal difference; 3) number of goals scored

=== Semi finals ===
1 May 2019
16:00

Central Bank Of India	0-3	Mumbai Customs

Cooperage Ground, Mumbai

2 May 2019
16:00

U Mumba F.C.	0-0	Air India
Penalties
	7-8

Cooperage Ground, Mumbai

=== Final ===
4 May 2019
16:30

Mumbai Customs	0-0	Air India
Penalties
	3-1

Cooperage Ground, Mumbai
