= 2016–17 MDFA Elite Division =

MDFA Elite Division
- Season: 2016–17
- Champions: Air India (9th title)
- All statistics correct as of December 2016.

The 2016–17 MDFA Elite Division is the 104th season of the MDFA Elite Division, the top-tier football league in Mumbai, a city in the Indian state of Maharashtra.

== Teams ==
Team	Location
Air India	Vile Parle
Central Bank of India	Ballard Estate
Indian Navy	Colaba
Karnataka Sporting	Churchgate
Kenkre F.C.	Mahim
Maharashtra Police	Colaba
Mumbai Customs	Santacruz
Mumbai F.C.	Mumbai
ONGC	Bandra
PIFA	Colaba
Rashtriya Chemicals & Fertilizers	Chembur
Union Bank of India	Nariman Point
Western Railway	Churchgate

== Table ==
Pos	Team	Pld	W	D	L	GF	GA	GD	Pts	Qualification or relegation
1	Air India	9	7	2	0	20	3	+17	23	Champion
2	ONGC	9	6	3	0	28	8	+20	21	
3	Maharashtra State Police	9	4	1	4	10	16	−6	13	
4	Mumbai Customs	9	3	3	3	9	9	0	12	
5	Western Railway	9	3	3	3	11	18	−7	12	
6	Union Bank	9	3	2	4	15	9	+6	11	
7	Central Bank	9	3	1	5	11	14	−3	10	
8	Kenkre	9	3	1	5	9	18	−9	10	
9	Karnataka Sporting	9	2	1	6	10	18	−8	7	
10	PIFA	9	2	1	6	13	23	−10	7	
11	Mumbai	0	-	-	-	-	-	—	0	Didn't play due to other commitments.
12	Rashtriya Chemicals & Fertilizers	0	-	-	-	-	-	—	0	Relegation to Super Division. Didn't play due to other commitments.
13	Indian Navy	0	-	-	-	-	-	—	0	Relegation to Super Division. Didn't play due to other commitments.

Updated to match(es) played on 22 June 2017. Source:
Rules for classification: 1) points; 2) head-to-head points; 3) head-to-head goal difference; 4) goal difference; 5) number of goals scored; 6) play-off match

== Result ==
Home \ Away	AIR	OFC	MSP	MC	WRM	UBI	CBI	KFC	KSA	PFC	MUM	RCF	INM
Air India	—		4–0			3–0	3–0	2–0	4–0		8–1		
ONGC	1–1	—											
Maharashtra State Police			—										
Mumbai Customs				—									
Western Railway	0–5				—								
Union Bank						—							
Central Bank							—						
Kenkre								—					
Karnataka Sporting	0–1								—				
PIFA										—			
Mumbai											—		
Rashtriya Chemicals & Fertilizers												—	
Indian Navy													—

Updated to match(es) played on 22 June 2017. Source:

== Top scorers ==
5 goals

- Rishikesh Shinde (Central Bank of India)

4 goals

- (India) Steven Dias (Mumbai)

3 goals

- (India) Karan Sawhney (Mumbai)

2 goals

- Fahim Faki (Central Bank of India)

1 goal

- (Nigeria) Michael Idewele (Union Bank of India)
- Ravi Sonune (Central Bank of India)
- Scott D'Souza (Central Bank of India)
- Anuraj Sidhu (Air India
- Sunny Thakur (Air India
- (India) John Coutinho (Mumbai Customs)
- (India) Satyam Sharma (ONGC)
- (India) Nitesh Monde (ONGC)
- (India) Dharmesh Patel (ONGC)
- (India) V Lalchhuanawma (ONGC)
- (India) Shilton D'Silva (Mumbai)
- (India) Charles Miranda (Mumbai Customs)
- (India) Rinaldo Fernandes (Mumbai Customs)
- (India) Sagar (Mumbai Customs)
- (India) Saheb Singh (Western Railways)
- (India) Ravikant Naidu (Western Railways)
- (India) Tejas Raut (PIFA)
