= Royston D'Souza =

Indian footballer (born 1990)

Royston D'souza
Personal information
- Date of birth: 28 October 1990 (age 36)
- Place of birth: Maharashtra, India
- Height: 1.65 m (5 ft 5 in)
- Position: Midfielder

Team information
- Current team: Fencibles United

Youth career
- 2008–2009: Mahindra United
- 2009–2011: Bengal Mumbai

Senior career*
Years	Team	Apps	(Gls)
2011–2012	Air India	9	(0)
2012–2013	Salgaocar	4	(0)
2013	Mumbai Tigers	4	(0)
2014	→ Sporting Goa (loan)	8	(0)
2015–2016	Union Bank of India		(1)
2016–2019	Eastern Suburbs	15	(0)
2020–	Fencibles United	14	(0)
2022–2023	Eastern Suburbs	0	(0)
- * Club domestic league appearances and goals as of 13 January 2020

Royston D'Souza (born 28 October 1990) is an Indian professional footballer who plays as a midfielder for Fencibles United in the NRFL Division 2. He has also worked as a football coach in New Zealand, with Eastern Suburbs.

== Early years ==
Royston D'Souza was born on 28 October 1990 in Mumbai, Maharashtra. He was selected for the U10 team at his high school, Don Bosco High School, Matunga, in which marked the beginning of his football journey. He then went on to represent the Maharashtra football team at u16 level while still continuing to rise through the age groups at Don Bosco. While in High School Dsouza was also a hockey player as well as a footballer but in the end chose to be a footballer.

He then joined I-League side Mahindra United at the U19 level in 2008. While with the Mahindra youth team Dsouza was converted into an attacking midfielder. He stayed at Mahindra for one year before joining Mumbai Harwood League outfit Bengal Mumbai FC, where Dsouza thought he would begin his professional career at during the I-League 2nd Division but Bengal Mumbai did not register for the 2nd Division and thus Dsouza barely played but in that time finished his studies.

In 2013, D'Souza appeared with St Joseph's FC at "The Times of India Baroda Open T20 Soccer Tournament". He later represented Maharashtra football team at the Santosh Trophy.

== Club career ==
=== Air India ===
Dsouza attended trials for I-League team Air India FC in August 2011 where after five days of training he had won a contract with the club. He then made his professional debut for Air India against Mumbai FC in the I-League on 23 October 2011. Air India lost 1–4.

=== Salgaocar ===
D'souza made his debut for Salgaocar F.C. on 12 October 2012 during an I-League match against Shillong Lajong F.C. at the Nehru Stadium in Shillong, Meghalaya; Salgaocar drew the match 1–1.

=== Mumbai Tigers ===
In 2013, he joined Mumbai Tigers FC for a season but later loaned out to Sporting Clube de Goa. In that season, he won Nadkarni Cup, organized by the Western India Football Association.

=== Sporting Goa (loan) ===
On 15 February 2014, Dsouza signed for Sporting Clube de Goa on loan from Mumbai Tigers. He made his debut for Sporting Goa on 16 February 2014 in the I-League match against Pune F.C. at the Balewadi Sports Complex in which he came on as a substitute for Mauvin Borges in the 44th minute as Sporting Goa drew the match 1–1.

With Sporting, he won the 2013–14 Goa Professional League.

=== Union Bank of India ===
In December 2015, Royston moved to Mumbai District Football Association side Union Bank of India and appeared in league matches. He scored his first goal on 6 January 2016 against Air India FC.

=== Eastern Suburbs AFC ===
After his loan stint in Union Bank of India, Royston joined New Zealand National League outfit Eastern Suburbs AFC in 2016 and had been with Eastern Suburbs Football Club for over four years. He started as a part-time coach while studying at Auckland University of Technology. He has grown to be part of the core coaching team, currently focusing on Grades 9 & 15. He works with the club driving strategy, tactics and growth for Youth Football. He also a part of the ESFC winter league team.

=== Fencibles United ===
In 2020, D'Souza moved to another New Zealand club, Fencibles United of Pakuranga, that competes in fourth division NRFL Division 2.

=== Return to Eastern Suburbs ===
In 2022 season, D'Souza rejoined Eastern Suburbs.

== Coaching career ==
Roy joined New Zealand side Eastern Suburbs AFC in 2016 with the bulk of his experience from a player's perspective, following a professional career spanning 5 years in India. Roy became a member of the club's Northern League (New Zealand) premier Men's squad, and began coaching to supplement his career in the strength and conditioning industry. Roy currently leading the club's player development program for 9th and 15th grade boys.

=== Strength and conditioning coach of New Zealand ===
Royston worked in collaboration with Fit For Life Gymnasium as a sports coach delivering personalized strength and conditioning sessions for young adults training in the space of competitive sports. Under the guidance of the head coach, he delivered sessions with personalized guidelines for the New Zealand s men's national football team in ISPA Handa Premiership.

== Personal life ==
While in Don Bosco High School, Matunga, Royston started playing hockey before the beginning of his football journey. His favorite player is David Silva. Royston is the brother of Indian footballer Raynier Fernandes.

== Career statistics ==
=== Club ===
As of 30 May 2015

Club	Season	League			Cup			AFC			Total		
Club	Season	Apps	Goals	Assists	Apps	Goals	Assists	Apps	Goals	Assists	Apps	Goals	Assists
Air India	2011–12	9	0	0	0	0	0	—	—	—	9	0	0
Salgaocar	2012–13	4	0	0	0	0	0	-	-	-	4	0	0
Sporting Goa	2013–14	7	0	0	0	0	0	-	-	-	7	0	0
2014–15	1	0	0	0	0	0	–	–	–	1	0	0	
Career total		21	0	0	0	0	0	0	0	0	21	0	0

== Honours ==
Mahindra United

- Mumbai Football League: 2010

Salgaocar

- Goa Professional League: 2012–13

Mumbai Tigers

- Nadkarni Cup: 2013

Sporting Clube de Goa

- Goa Professional League: 2013–14

== See also ==
- List of Indian football players in foreign leagues
