= 2017–18 MDFA Elite Division =

MDFA Elite Division
- Season: 2017–18
- Champions: ONGC (4th title)
- All statistics correct as of 1 August 2017.

The 2017–18 MDFA Elite Division is the 105th season of the MDFA Elite Division, the top-tier football league in Mumbai, a city in the Indian state of Maharashtra.

== Format ==
The 13 teams will play Preliminary League on a single leg basis. The two teams standing 1st and 2nd after completion of the Preliminary League will be declared the winner and runner-up of the MDFA Elite Division. The Two teams standing last after completion of the Preliminary league will be demoted to the Super Division of the 2018–19 season. The matches will be played at Cooperage Football Ground and Mumbai Football Arena. The league will commence from 1 September 2017.

== Teams ==
Team	Location
Air India	Vile Parle
Central Bank of India	Ballard Estate
Century Rayon	Churchgate
Karnataka Sporting	Churchgate
Kenkre F.C.	Mahim
Maharashtra Police	Colaba
Mumbai Customs	Santacruz
Mumbai Strikers	Mulund
ONGC	Bandra
PIFA	Colaba
Union Bank of India	Nariman Point
Western Railway	Churchgate

== Table ==
Pos	Team	Pld	W	D	L	GF	GA	GD	Pts	Qualification or relegation
1	ONGC	11	10	1	0	35	6	+29	31	Champion
2	Air India	11	10	0	1	41	5	+36	30	Runners Up
3	Union Bank	11	7	2	2	24	11	+13	23	
4	Western Railway	11	5	3	3	16	15	+1	18	
5	Mumbai Customs	11	5	1	5	13	13	0	16	
6	Karnataka Sporting	11	4	3	4	20	16	+4	15	
7	PIFA	11	3	3	5	12	18	−6	12	
8	Maharashtra State Police	11	3	2	6	13	29	−16	11	
9	Mumbai Strikers S.C	11	3	2	6	9	27	−18	11	
10	Central Bank	11	2	2	7	6	13	−7	8	
11	Century Rayon	11	1	3	7	16	33	−17	6	
12	Kenkre	11	1	2	8	10	29	−19	5	

Updated to match(es) played on 9 July 2018. Source:
Rules for classification: 1) points; 2) head-to-head points; 3) head-to-head goal difference; 4) goal difference; 5) number of goals scored; 6) play-off match
- No teams were relegated due to re-structuring of the league for next season.

== Results table ==
Home \ Away	AIR	CBI	CR	KSA	KFC	MSP	MC	MSC	OFC	PFC	UBI	WRM
Air India												
Central Bank of India												
Century Rayon												
Karnataka Sporting												
Kenkre												
Maharashtra Police												
Central Board of Excise and Customs												
Mumbai Strikers												
ONGC												
PIFA												
Union Bank of India												2–1
Western Railway											1–2	

Legend: Blue = home team win; Yellow = draw; Red = away team win.
