= 2015–16 MDFA Elite Division =

103rd MDFA Elite Division
- Season: 2015–16
- Champions: ONGC FC
- Relegated: G.M Sports, Central Railway
- Matches: 182
- Top goalscorer: Arihi Uchela

The 2015–16 MDFA Elite Division is the top-tier football in the Indian city of Mumbai. This is the 103rd season of the league. It was started from 14 September 2015. Air India FC are the defending champions. 14 teams participated in the league. All the matches were played at Cooperage Football Ground. ONGC F.C were crowned as champion while Mumbai F.C were runners up.

== Teams ==
Team	Location
Air India FC	Mumbai
Central Bank	Mumbai
Central Railway	Chhatrapati Shivaji Terminus
G.M Sports	Mumbai
Indian Navy	Mumbai
Karnataka Sporting	Churchgate
Kenkre F.C.	Mumbai
Mumbai Customs	Santacruz
Mumbai F.C	Mumbai
ONGC FC	Mumbai
PIFA F.C.	Colaba
Rashtriya Chemicals & Fertilizers	Chembur
Union Bank	Mumbai
Western Railway	Churchgate

== League table ==
Pos	Team	Pld	W	D	L	GF	GA	GD	Pts	Qualification or relegation
1	ONGC FC	13	10	2	1	31	16	+15	32	Champion
2	Mumbai F.C.	13	10	1	2	38	12	+26	31	
3	Air India F.C	13	9	1	3	46	9	+37	28	
4	Kenkre F.C.	13	7	3	3	24	18	+6	24	
5	Mumbai Customs	13	7	2	4	27	12	+15	23	
6	Union Bank of India	13	6	3	4	20	16	+4	21	
7	Central Bank	13	5	4	4	16	16	0	19	
8	Western Railway	13	5	3	5	23	23	0	18	
9	Indian Navy	13	5	1	7	17	24	−7	16	
10	Karnataka Sporting	13	4	2	7	18	19	−1	14	
11	PIFA F.C.	13	4	1	8	19	28	−9	13	
12	Rashtriya Chemicals & Fertilizers	13	3	2	8	13	27	−14	11	
13	Central Railway	13	2	1	10	10	38	−28	7	Relegation to Super Division
14	G.M Sports	13	0	0	13	6	50	−44	0	Relegation to Super Division

Updated to match(es) played on 01 April 2016. Source:
Rules for classification: 1) points; 2) head-to-head points; 3) head-to-head goal difference; 4) goal difference; 5) number of goals scored; 6) play-off match

== Statistics ==
As of match played on 01 April 2016
Source: Football Masala website

=== Top scorers ===
Rank	Player	Club	Goals
1	(Nigeria) Arihi Uchela	Karnataka Sporting	8
2	(India) Parminder Singh	ONGC FC	8
3	(Nigeria) Ennock Annan	ONGC FC	7
4	(India) Deepak Irmali	Mumbai Customs	6
5	(India) Neil Gaikwad	Air India FC	6
6	(Japan) Taisuke Matsugae	Mumbai F.C	6
7	(India) Cletus Paul	Mumbai FC	6
8	(Argentina) Troy Nunes	Rashtriya Chemicals & Fertilizers	5
9	(India) Raynier Fernandes	Air India FC	5
10	(India) Rashid Shaikh	Central Railway	5
