= 2017–18 MDFA Super Division =

MDFA Super Division
- Season: 2017–18
- Champions: HDFC Bank
- All statistics correct as of 21 August 2019.

The MDFA Super Division is a men's semi-professional football league in Mumbai, a city in the Indian state of Maharashtra. The league serves as the second-tier of the Mumbai Football League and is organized by the Mumbai District Football Association. It is contested by 29 clubs. The two teams standing 1st and 2nd in their respective groups after completion of the Group Stage, advance to the knockout round of the MDFA Super Division. The team standing last after completion of the Group Stage in the each group will be demoted to the First Division of the 2018-19 season. The matches will be played at Mumbai Football Arena and St Xaviers Ground.

== Teams Qualified For play-off ==
=== Group A ===
- FSI - Seaview
- Bombay Gymkhana

=== Group B ===
- Dena Bank
- FC India

=== Group C ===
- Central Railway
- Bank of India

=== Group D ===
- Air India U-19
- HDFC Bank

== Play-off ==
=== Group A ===
Pos	Team	Pld	W	D	L	GF	GA	GD	Pts	Qualification or relegation
1	Air India U-19	3	3	0	0	6	3	+3	9	Semi-finals
2	Central Railway	3	2	0	1	6	5	+1	6	Semi-finals
3	Dena Bank	3	1	0	2	3	4	−1	3	
4	FSI - Sea View	3	0	0	3	5	8	−3	0	

Updated to match(es) played on 26 June 2018. Source:
Rules for classification: 1) points; 2) goal difference; 3) head-to-head points; 4) number of goals scored; 5) play-off match

=== Group B ===
Pos	Team	Pld	W	D	L	GF	GA	GD	Pts	Qualification or relegation
1	Bank Of India	3	2	1	0	6	2	+4	7	Semi-finals
2	HDFC Bank	3	2	0	1	3	3	0	6	Semi-finals
3	Bombay Gymkhana	3	0	2	1	5	6	−1	2	
4	FC India	3	0	1	2	4	7	−3	1	

Updated to match(es) played on 26 June 2018. Source:
Rules for classification: 1) points; 2) goal difference; 3) head-to-head points; 4) number of goals scored; 5) play-off match

== Semi finals ==
28 April 2018
14:00

HDFC Bank	1-1	Air India U-19
Penalties
	5-3

Mumbai Football Arena, Mumbai

28 April 2018
17:00

Central Railway	2-1	Bank Of India

Mumbai Football Arena, Mumbai

== Final ==
30 April 2018
17:00

HDFC Bank	2-0	Central Railway

Cooperage Ground, Mumbai
