= Millat FC =

Indian association football club based in Mumbai

Millat
- Full name: Millat Football Club
- Short name: MFC
- Founded: 2009; 16 years ago
- Ground: Cooperage Ground
- Capacity: 5,000
- Owner: Farhan Butt
- Head coach: Augusto Wilson da Silva
- League: Mumbai Premier League
Home colours	Away colours

Millat Football Club (also known as Mumbai Millat FC) is an Indian professional football club based in Andheri-Jogeshwari, Mumbai, Maharashtra. It currently competes in the Mumbai Premier League (the top division of the Mumbai Football League).

== History ==
Founded in 2009, Millat FC has been competing in the MFA Elite Division since the restructured 2018-19 season.

In the 2022–23 MFA Elite Division season, Millat secured the third spot after beating Bombay Muslims SC 3–1. Since Karnataka Sporting was not eligible to represent Maharashtra in the newly formed I-League 3, Millat FC was nominated for the inaugural season.

== Honours ==
=== Domestic league ===
- MFA Super Division
  - Champions: 2021–22
