= Nadkarni Cup =

- Organiser(s): Mumbai Football Association
- Founded: 1908; 118 years ago
- Region: India (Mumbai)
- Teams: 16
- Current champions: MYJ-GMSC (1st title)
- Most championships: Tata SC (17 titles)
- 2024 Nadkarni Cup

The Nadkarni Cup is a football competition in Mumbai, India, which was first held in 1908. From 1908–1913 it was known as Junior Rovers Cup, contested by school and college teams of Bombay, with the trophy originally provided by G. N. Nadkarni. It is hosted by the Mumbai Football Association. The Cup was not held for some years due to the World War I.

In 1925, the Western India Football Association allocated Junior Rovers Cup trophy to a completely new tournament. The cup is contested by the Maharashtra State Senior Men's Football League, Mumbai Premier League and a couple of Mumbai Super League clubs.

== Prizes ==
Amounts in Indian rupee.

	Amount
Champions	₹100000
Runners-up	₹60000

== Venue ==
Mumbai
Cooperage Ground
Capacity: 5,000
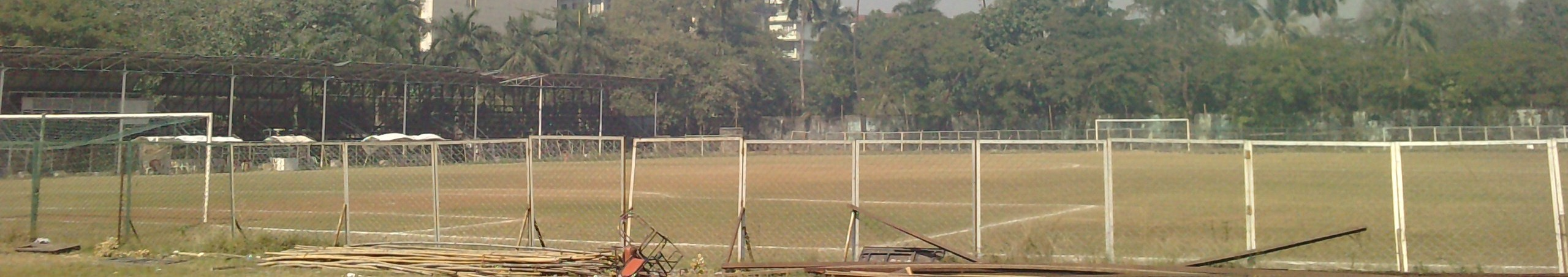

== Results ==
Year	Winners	Score	Runners-up	Notes
Junior Rovers Tournament (Nadkarni Cup)
1908	BES School (Bombay Education Society)	1–0	St Mary's College (Byculla)	
1909	St Mary's College	4–0	Cathedral High School	
1910	St Mary's College	3–0	BES School	
1911	St Mary's College	5–0	YMCA Juniors (Young Men's Christian Association)	
1912	St Mary's College	6–0	BES School	
1913	BES School	2–1	St Mary's College	
Nadkarni Cup
1925	Qamer Club	2–1	Matunga Hindus	
1926	Victoria Jubilee Technical Institute	0–0, 2–0	Colaba Casuals	
1927	Colaba Rangers	2–0	King George V	
1928	Colaba United	2–1	King George V	
1929	King George V	1–1, 0–0, 1–0	Colaba United	
1930	Colaba United	1–0	Young Footballers	
1931	Bombay, Baroda and Central India Railway	3–0	Young Footballers	
1932	Colaba United	1–0	King George V	
1933	Colaba United	1–0	Bengal Club	
1934	Bombay Portuguese Association	2–2, 1–0	Colaba United	
1935	Bombay City	3–0	Georgians	
1936	Bombay City	1–0	Lower Colaba Sokolis S.C.	
1937	Young Goans	0–0, 1–0	Dewjee's Kanara XI	
1938	Young Goans	1–0	Jagannath Fishermen	
1939	Young Goans	4–0	South Kanara	^{1}
1940	Bombay YMCA	1–0	Bombay Muslims	
1941	Jagannath Fishermen	1–0	Bombay YMCA	
1942	WIAA Staff	2–0	BEST	
1943	WIAA Staff	4–2	Tata SC	
1944	Tata SC	1–0	South Indians	
1945	Tata SC	1–0	St Francis Goans	
1946	Tata SC	1–0, 0–1, 3–0	Trades India SC	^{2}
1947	Trades India SC	3–2, 2–0	Great Indian Peninsular Railway	^{3}
1948	Great Indian Peninsular Railway	4–1	Rashid's XI	
1949	Bombay Amateurs	2–1	Burmah-Shell SC	
1950	Great Indian Peninsular Railway	2–1	Burmah-Shell SC	
1951	Indian Naval Dockyard	3–0	WIMCO SC (Western India Match Company)	
1952	Dynamos	2–0	Burmah-Shell SC	
1953	Central Railway	2–0	Dynamos	
1954	Western Railway	2–0	India Culture League	
1955	Western Railway	3–1, 2–0	Central Railway	^{4}
1956	Central Railway	2–2, 1–0, 4–4, 1–0	Caltex SC (California Texas Oil Company)	^{5}
1957	Indian Navy	3–1	Caltex SC (California Texas Oil Company)	
1958	Tata SC	2–0	Tata SC Youth	
1959	Tata SC	2–1	Tata SC Youth	
1960	Tata SC	1–1, 2–1	Western Railway	
1961	Tata SC	2–0	Western Railway	
1962	Mafatlal Mills	1–1, 4–1	Indian Navy	
1963	Mafatlal Mills	1–0	Phoenix Mills	
1964	Central Railway	1–1, 1–0	Mafatlal Mills	
1965	Tata SC	1–0	Mafatlal Mills	
1966	Central Railway	3–1	Reserve Bank	
1967	Tata SC	2–1	Mafatlal Group	
1968	Mafatlal Group	3–2	Mahindra & Mahindra	
1969	Mafatlal Group	2–1	Western Railway	
1970	Western Railway	4–3	Mafatlal Group	
1971	Mafatlal Group	3–1	Mahindra & Mahindra	
1972	Tata SC	1–1, 1–0	Mafatlal Group	
1973	Central Bank	2–0	Tata SC	
1974	Orkay Mills	3–1	Mahindra & Mahindra	
1975	Mafatlal Group and Tata SC (joint winners) – 1–1, 0–0			
1976	Central Bank	0–0, 3–1	Mafatlal Group	
1977	Orkay Mills	1–0	Mafatlal Group	
1978	Mafatlal Group	2–2, 4–0	Central Railway	
1979	Tata SC	1–0	Mafatlal SC	
1980	Tata SC and Mafatlal SC (joint winners) – 1–1			
1981	Tata SC and Mafatlal SC (joint winners) – 2–2			
1982	Tata SC and RCF (Rashtriya Chemicals & Fertilizers) (joint winners) – 0–0, 0–0			
1983	Tata SC	2–0	Air India FC	
1984	Air India FC	0–0, (3–1 p)	RCF	^{6}
1985	Tata SC	1–0	Western Railway	
1986	Mahindra & Mahindra	2–0	RCF	
1987	RCF	1–0	Hotel President	
1988	Orkay Mills	0–0, (5–4 p)	Air India FC	
1989	RCF	1–0	Union Bank	
1990	Carmelites	1–1, (5–4 p)	Maharashtra State Police	
1991	Air India FC	Round robin	Tata Electric	
1992	RCF Colony Boys	Round robin	Hotel Centaur	
1993–2000	Not held			
2001	Mahindra United FC	5–0	Air India FC	
2002	Mahindra United FC	2–0	RCF	
2003	Haywards 2000	2–1	Central Railway	
2005	Air India FC	1–1 (4–3 p)	Mahindra United FC	
2006	Air India FC	1–0	Mumbai Customs	
2007	Central Railway	3–0	ONGC FC	
2008	United Bank	3–1	Western Railway	
2009	Air India FC	1–0	Kenkre Academy	
2010	Mumbai FC	2–0	Air India FC	
2011	Mumbai FC	4–0	PIFA Colaba FC	
2012	Dodsal FC	5–0	Mumbai Customs	
2013	Mumbai Tigers	3–0	RCF	
2014	ONGC FC	0–0, (5–4 p)	Air India FC	
2015	Mumbai FC	1–0	Air India FC	
2016	Mumbai FC	–	PIFA Colaba FC	
2017	Air India FC	3–2	PIFA Colaba FC	
2018	Air India FC	2–1	Union Bank of India	
2019	Air India FC	2–1	HDFC Bank	
2023	Ambernath United Atlanta	3–1	Bank of Baroda	
2024	MYJ-GMSC	1–0	Mumbai City (R)	
Source: List of Nadkarni Cup Finals

Notes:

1. First match abandoned at 87' (score 2-0), pitch invasion
2. Replay after two legs
3. Two legs
4. Two legs
5. Two replays after two legs
6. Played early 1985

== See also ==
- Western India Football Association
- Mumbai Football Association
- Mumbai Football League
- Rovers Cup
