= South-East-Central Railway SC =

SEC Railway
- Full name: South East Central Railway Sports Club
- Nickname: The Railmen
- Ground: The Cooperage Ground, Mumbai, Maharashtra
- Capacity: 12,000
- Manager: (India) Jeevan Rajak
- League: NFL 2nd Division India
- 2006-07: 3rd (Group A)
Home colours	Away colours

South East Central Railway Sports Club is an Indian institutional football club based in Mumbai, Maharashtra.

== Overview ==
The club is the merger of three Indian football clubs – South Railway SC, Eastern Railway SC and Central Railway SC. They play their home matches on The Cooperage Ground in Mumbai. They are currently playing in the NFL 2nd Division and are one of the most popular Maharashtrian clubs in India.

Fans refer to them as the Railmen in English. They have recently improved a lot in their game under their current coach Santanu Ghosh. They have four Inter-Railway Trophies under their belt and added one memorable Khalifa Ziauddin Maharashtra State Club Championship in 2001. SEC Railway is voted as one of the prime contenders for the National Football League(India) 2nd Division.

== Players ==
=== Current roster ===
Note: Flags indicate national team as defined under FIFA eligibility rules; some limited exceptions apply. Players may hold more than one non-FIFA nationality.

No.	Pos.	Nation	Player
22	GK	IND	Gurpreet Singh
25	DF	IND	Jagabandhu Modi
5	DF	IND	Deepanshu Majumder
2	DF	IND	Vijay Anand Dadil
28	DF	IND	Balpreet Singh
8	MF	IND	Md.Tajuddin
18	MF	IND	Md.Rizwan
15	MF	IND	Subir Maji
11	MF	IND	Kulwant Singh
10	FW	IND	Ram Chandra Murmu
16	FW	IND	S.Senthil Kumar
21	GK	IND	Sunil Barla
23	MF	IND	Harsh Vardhan Sendey
7	FW		John Murray
3	DF	IND	Milan Dey
19		IND	Ganesh Chandra Hansda
14		IND	P.Santosh Kumar
6		IND	Durga Charan Muduli

No.	Pos.	Nation	Player
—		IND	Mohammed Nadeem
—		IND	Somnath Das
—		IND	Niladri Shekhar Chakraborty
—		IND	Surajit Chakraborty Sr
—		IND	Bijoy Das

=== Team management ===
Team Management Table
Name	Position
(India) Jeevan Rajak	Manager
(India) Santanu Ghosh	Coach

== Honours ==
=== Domestic tournaments ===
- National Football League III (East Zone)
  - Champions (1):- 2006–07
- Rovers Cup
  - Runners-up (1): 1998
- Lal Bahadur Shastri Cup
  - Runners-up (1): 2005
