= Pune District Football Association Stadium =

Football ground in Pune, India

- Full name: Pune District Football Association Stadium
- Location: Ghorpari, Pune, India
- Owner: Pune District Football Association
- Operator: Pune District Football Association

Construction
- Groundbreaking: 2009
- Built: 2014
- Opened: 2014
- Cost: Rs. 75 Lakhs

Tenant
- Pune District Football Association

Pune District Football Association Stadium is a football ground in Ghorpari area of Pune, Maharashtra. The Pune District Football Association announced that the 3.5 acres land was leased in 2009 for the ground development. It has been leased for 30 years.
