= Pune Football League =

- Organising body: Poona District Football Association
- Country: India
- Divisions: 4
- Number of clubs: 100+
- Level on pyramid: 2–5
- Promotion to: Various
- Relegation to: Various

The Pune Football League is a football competition overseen by the Poona District Football Association in Pune District of Maharashtra. It follows a ladder-based structure and includes four divisions with over 100 teams. The league encompasses teams from various locations across Pune District, the city of Pune, spanning from Pimpri-Chinchwad to Hadapsar. During the pre-season phase, clubs conduct trials, and the final roster is registered with the Mumbai District Football Association. The initial round-robin phase of the league typically lasts for three months, and the top-performing clubs proceed to a month-long post-season phase.

== Structure ==
PDFA (Poona District Football Association) Football League
Tier	Division
1 _{(2 on Maharashtra football pyramid)}	PFL Super Division _{↑promote (to MSSMFL) ↓relegate}
2 _{(3 on Maharashtra football pyramid)}	PFL Division One _{↑promote ↓relegate}
3 _{(4 on Maharashtra football pyramid)}	PFL Division Two _{↑promote ↓relegate}
4 _{(5 on Maharashtra football pyramid)}	PFL Division Three _{↑promote}

== PDFA Super Division League ==
The Super Division represents the highest level of competition in the PFL.

PDFA Super Division League
- Organising body: Poona District Football Association (PDFA)
- Country: India
- Number of clubs: 14
- Level on pyramid: 2
- Promotion to: Maharashtra State Senior Menʼs Football League
- Relegation to: PDFA First Division League
- Current champions: AIYFA Sky Hawks

=== Format ===
Clubs participate in an all-play-all format. Following this preliminary phase, the top six clubs from each group advance to the postseason playoffs. The points and goals scored during the preliminary phase do not carry over to the next round. At the conclusion of the playoff, the top two clubs earn promotion. Conversely, the two clubss at the bottom are demoted.

=== Clubs (2024) ===
AIYFA Sky Hawks A	Bombay Engineering Group
CMS Falcons A	Deccan XI A
Diego Juniors FCA	Fatima XI A
Greenbox Chetak FC A	Indrayani Sports Club A
Mischief Makers FC	Parshuramians SC A
Phoenix SC A	Sangam Young Boys A
SSKEMS FC	Class X Veral Khed

== PDFA First Division League ==
=== Clubs (2020) ===
Aryans Sports A	Association Poona Social	City Club	City Police - Pune	Commandos FC A
Deccan XI FC B	Deccan XI FC D	Ghorpadi Young Ones XI	Giantz FC A	Gunners Football Club
Jolly Rangehills FC	PIFA	Rangehills Milan	Roopali SC A	Ghorpadi Tamil United
Sangvi Football Club A	Tiger Combine	United Poona Sports Academy A	Utkarsh Krida Manch A	VOBA

== PDFA Second Division League ==
=== Clubs (2020) ===
AIYFA Sky Hawks B	Ashoka FC	Blue Stag Sports Academy	Central Railways - Pune	CMS Falcons B	Deccan XI FC C
FC BECKDINHO A	FC Joseph	FC Shivneri	FIN IQ GOG FCC	GOLFA	Dynamites SC
Greenbox Chetak FC B	Khadki Blues A	KIRKEENS FC	NDA YSC	New India Soccer Club	Parshuramians SC B
PCH Lions	Rahul FA	Ram Sporting A	Rangehills Young Boys	Real Pune United	Sangam Young Boys C
Strikers FC A	SUKHAI FC	Swaraj FC	Unique Wanowrie FC	Valley Hunters FC	Wanwadi Sports Club

== PDFA Third Division League ==
=== Clubs (2020) ===
Bhor FC	Infants FC	Akhil Bhusari Colony	Friends XI	Utkarsh Krida Manch B	Mathew FA	Indrayani Sports Club B
DMR FC	Invedors FC	Thundercatz B	Black Hawks FC	Predators FC	Golden Feather FC	Bharati FC
Giantz FC B	Bopodi Soccer Club	Commandos FC B	United Poona Sports Academy B	KMP XI	Phoenix SC B	Pune Pioneers FC
Eagle FC	Nav Maharashtra FC	Association Poona Social - B	Mominpura FC	Aryans Sports B	Shivajians FC - C	
Junner Taluka FC	Sunny Days	AFA Samford	NAAZ FA	Knights XI	Sai Football Academy	
National Youth FA	Yoddha FC	Puneri Warriors	Saswad Football Club	CMS Falcons C	Galactik Warriors Football Club	
Poona Social Sports Club	Diego Juniors FCA U-21	Snigmay FCBETA A-team	VOBA B	Telecom Sport Club	Highlanders FC	
Noisy Boys	Legends United Football Club	Daksh Football Academy	Sangvi Football Club B	Galaxy United Football Club	P. C. H. LIONS B	
