= Poona District Football Association =

- Sport: Football
- Jurisdiction: District
- Abbreviation: PDFA
- Founded: 1972; 54 years ago
- Affiliation: All India Football Federation (AIFF)
- Regional affiliation: Western India Football Association
- Headquarters: Pune
- President: Vishwajeet Kadam
- CEO: Mr. Akshay Chaudhary

Poona Football Association (PDFA) governs football in and around the Indian city of Pune. It is one of the district associations of the Western India Football Association, affiliated to the All India Football Federation (AIFF). The league encompasses teams from various locations, spanning from Pimpri-Chinchwad to Hadapsar.

== History ==
The Poona District Football Association came into inception from the year 1972 with motive of promoting, developing and popularising the game of football at grassroot level. More that 230 teams have been registered with the PDFA, including men's, women's and youth competitions.

== Competitions ==
=== Men's senior ===
- PFL Super Division
- PFL Division One
- PFL Division Two
- PFL Division Three

=== Women's senior ===
- PDFA Women’s League

=== Youth ===
- Pune Youth League (U9, U11, U13, U15, U17)

== Main grounds ==
- Pune District Football Association Stadium
- Shree Shiv Chhatrapati Sports Complex
- Ganga Legends Ground
- TopPlay Kharadi (Youth leauges)

== See also ==
- Maharashtra State Senior Men's Football League
