= Mighty Young Joe–Goalorious Mothers SC =

Indian association football club based in Mumbai

MYJ–GMSC
- Full name: Mighty Young Joe–Goalorious Mothers Sports Club
- Nickname: The Mighty Lions
- Short name: MYJ
- Founded: 2008; 18 years ago (as Mighty Young Joe Sports Club)
- Ground: St. Francis D'Assisi High School Ground; Neville D'souza Ground; Cooperage Ground
- Owner(s): Joe Miranda; Jeddy Almeida
- Head coach: Vijith Shetty
- League: I-League 2 Mumbai Premier League
- 2024–25: MSSMFL, 2nd of 8
- Website: myjfc.in
Home colours	Away colours	Third colours

Mighty Young Joe–Goalorious Mothers Sports Club (also known as MYJ Mumbai) is an Indian professional football club based in Orlem, a prominent catholic neighborhood in Malad, Mumbai. They won the prestigious Nadkarni Cup in 2024.

== History ==
Mighty Young Joe FC, established in 2008 by Agnelo Picardo and led by Joe Miranda, primarily competes in veteran and rink tournaments around the city.

GMSC club crest

Before the 2023–24 Mumbai Premier League, MYJ bought a 70% stake in Goalorious Mothers Sporting Club which was based in Immaculate Conception Colony, Borivali, and led by Jeddy Almeida. GMSC was founded on 5th September 2018 and had been competing in Mumbai's top division for five years before the merger. The GMSC club crest prominently features the image of Mother Mary from whom the club derives its name. The announcement of this alliance was made at the official jersey launch event.

Joe Miranda has been an integral figure in the football community for over a decade, having organized private and veteran tournaments. On the merger, he said:

I wanted to get into professional leagues, and Vijith and Steven suggested Jeddy and GMSC, and that’s how it came about.

On 1 May 2024, they drew their penultimate game against Millat FC to win the title and stay unbeaten throughout the tournament. They also entered their reserve side into the 2024 Reliance Foundation Development League.

On 9 September, MYJ allied with Carmona SC, a football club from Goa, which made them eligible to compete in the GFA Third Division.

On 11 September, they progressed to the playoffs of the 2024-25 I-League 3 by thrashing RKM 5-1, while HAL lost to Chanmari FC 1-2. They defeated Abbas Union 1-0 in their final playoff match. This enabled them to finish third in their playoff group and promoted them to the 2025-26 I-League 2 season.

In the 2024–25 Mumbai Premier League, they finished runners-up to India On Track FC, losing by 1-0 on the final day of the season.

MYJ-GMSC began their 2026 Indian Football League 2 journey on 27 March 2026 against Sporting Club Bengaluru. They are only club from Mumbai in the 2026 national 3rd division of the Indian football pyramid. National football returned to the Cooperage Ground after a year.

Running an I-League 2 club is, by Miranda's own admission, a “bleeding” exercise. MYJ-GMSC are set to spend ₹2.5 crore this I-League 2 season with little expectation of returns. Each home game costs ₹7–10 lakh, while away matches with travel and stay for a 30-member squad can go up to ₹15–20 lakh.

MYJ-GMSC avoided relegation on the last day of the 2025–26 I-League 2 season.

== Coaching staff ==
Position	Name
Head coach	(India) Vijith Shetty
Assistant coach	(India) Santosh Koli (India) Agnelo Picardo
Goalkeeping coach	(India) Sarfaraz Critchley
Strength and conditioning coach	(India) Manuel D'Souza
Physiotherapist	(India) Smruti Pawar
Team manager	(India) Henry Picardo
Assistant manager	(Netherlands) Jonathan Fraser

== Honours ==
=== Domestic ===
- Mumbai Premier League
  - Champions: 2023–24
- Nadkarni Cup
  - Champions: 2024
