= ONGC FC =

Former Indian association football club

ONGC
- Full name: Oil and Natural Gas Corporation Football Club
- Nickname: The Oilmen
- Short name: ONGC, ONGCFC
- Founded: 1990s (as Oil & Natural Gas Commission); 2006; 20 years ago (as ONGC FC)
- Ground: Cooperage Ground
- Capacity: 5,000
- Owner: ONGC
- Chairman: Vivek Bhowmik
- Head coach: Dharmesh Patel
- League: MDFA Elite League
- Website: ongcindia.com/football

Oil and Natural Gas Corporation Football Club (known simply as ONGC FC) was an Indian professional football club based in Mumbai. The club was an institutional arm of the Oil and Natural Gas Corporation (ONGC), and part of its multi-sports club.

Nicknamed "The Oilmen", they competed in both the domestic top tiers National Football League, and I-League, alongside the regional competition named MDFA Elite League. The club also operated a non-professional football section that participates in regional corporate tournaments, including All-India Public Sector League.

== History ==
=== 2006–2010: I-League 2nd Division ===
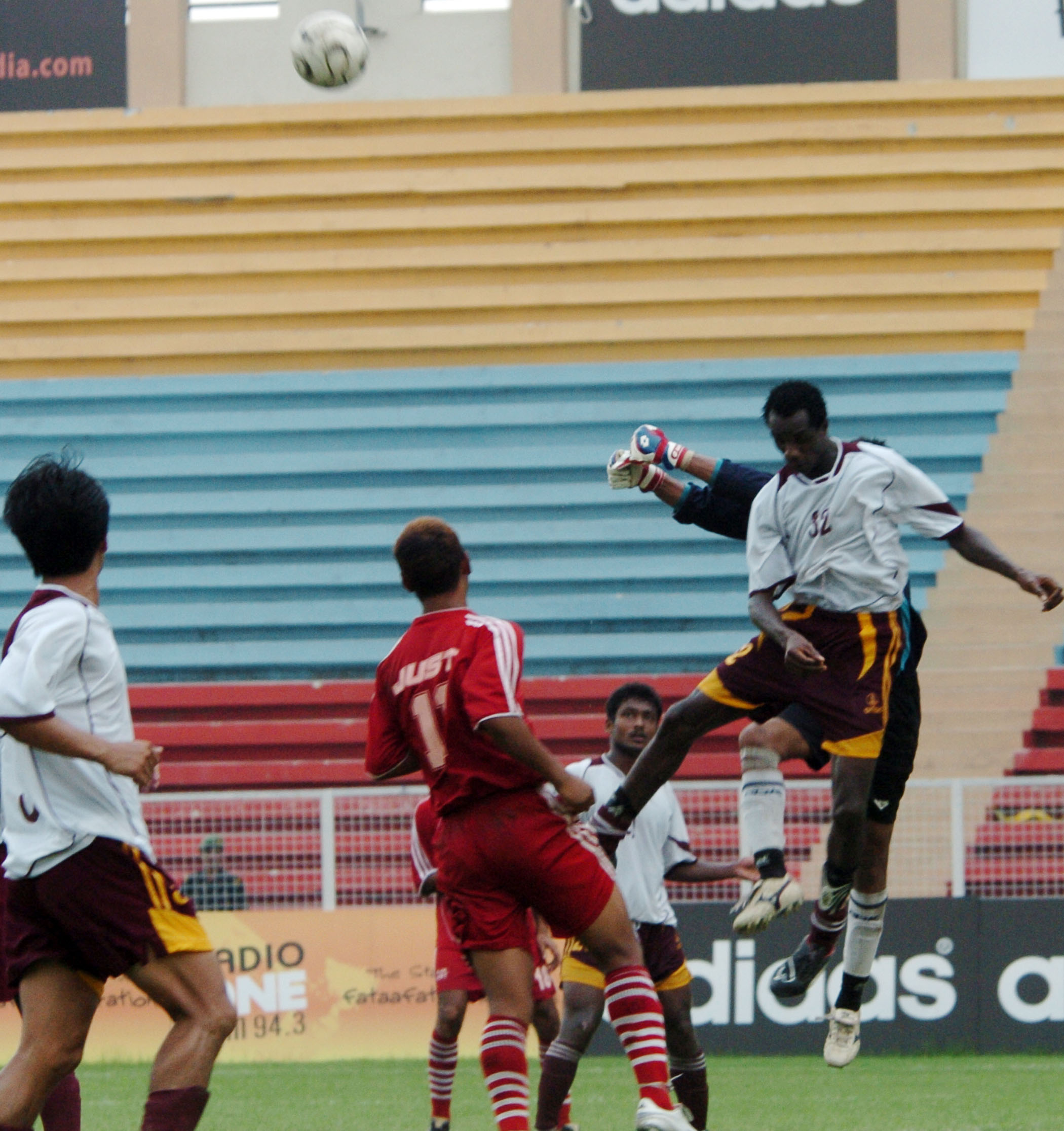
ONGC players (in white and black) in action against Border Security Force in 2008 Durand Cup at Ambedkar Stadium in New Delhi.

In 2006, the Oil and Natural Gas Corporation revived its football section and renamed it as ONGC F.C., in hope of expanding their involvement in Indian football, which included title sponsoring the old National Football League, Durand Cup and Nehru Cup. In 2007, ONGC reached final of the prestigious Bordoloi Trophy, in which they were beaten by Port Authority of Thailand 3–0 at the end. In their inaugural season in the I-League 2nd Division, the club finished on 6th place. After their first season, the club offered their players full-time contracts and higher salaries, as well as inducting youth sections. These changes helped the club finish on 5th place in the final round of the 2009 I-League 2nd Division, after topping the group stage. The next season would finally see ONGC get promoted, after the club won the 2010 I-League 2nd Division and went undefeated in the final round. It was the club's biggest achievement in domestic football.

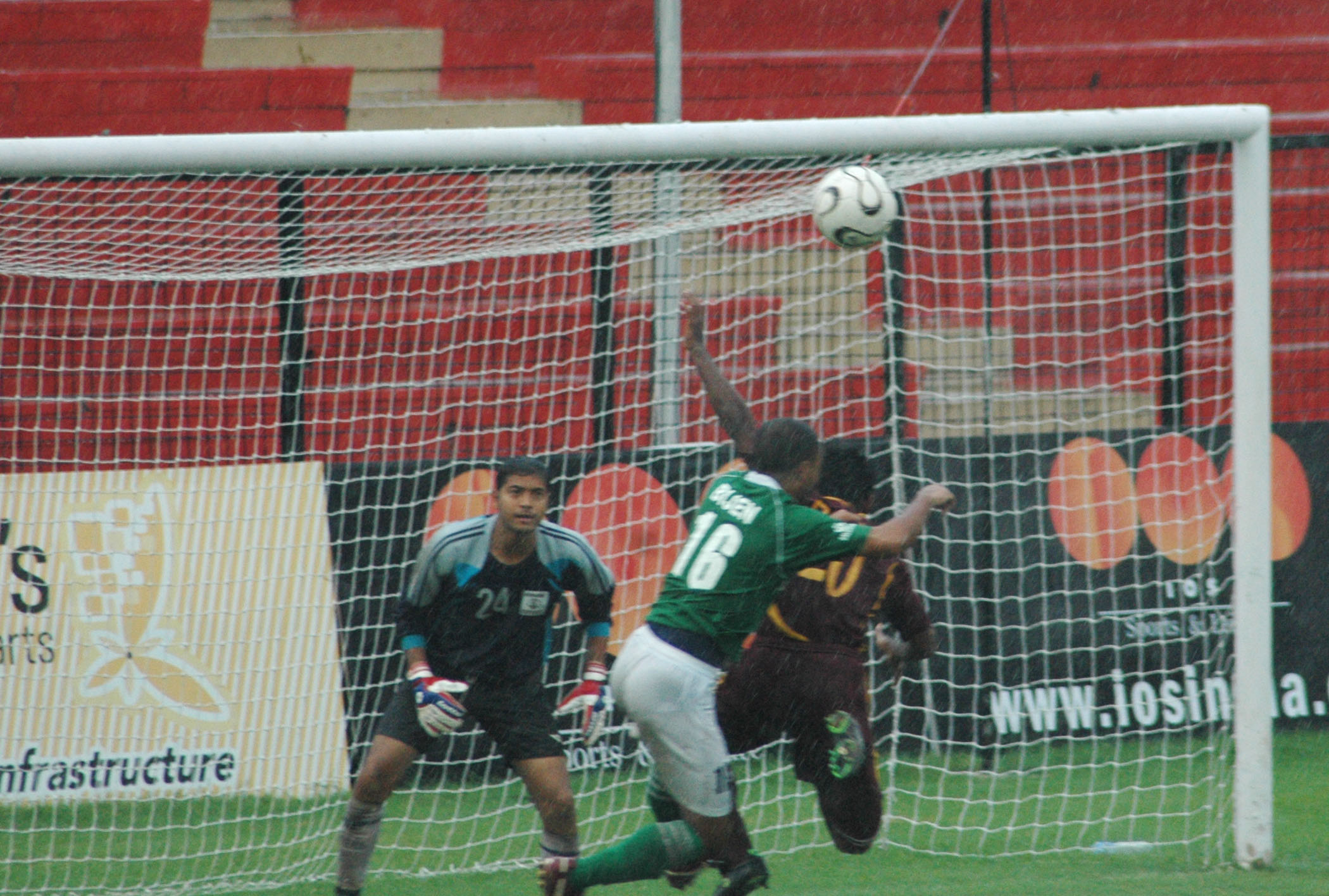
ONGC players defending against Salgaocar (in green) at the Durand Cup in New Delhi, 2008.

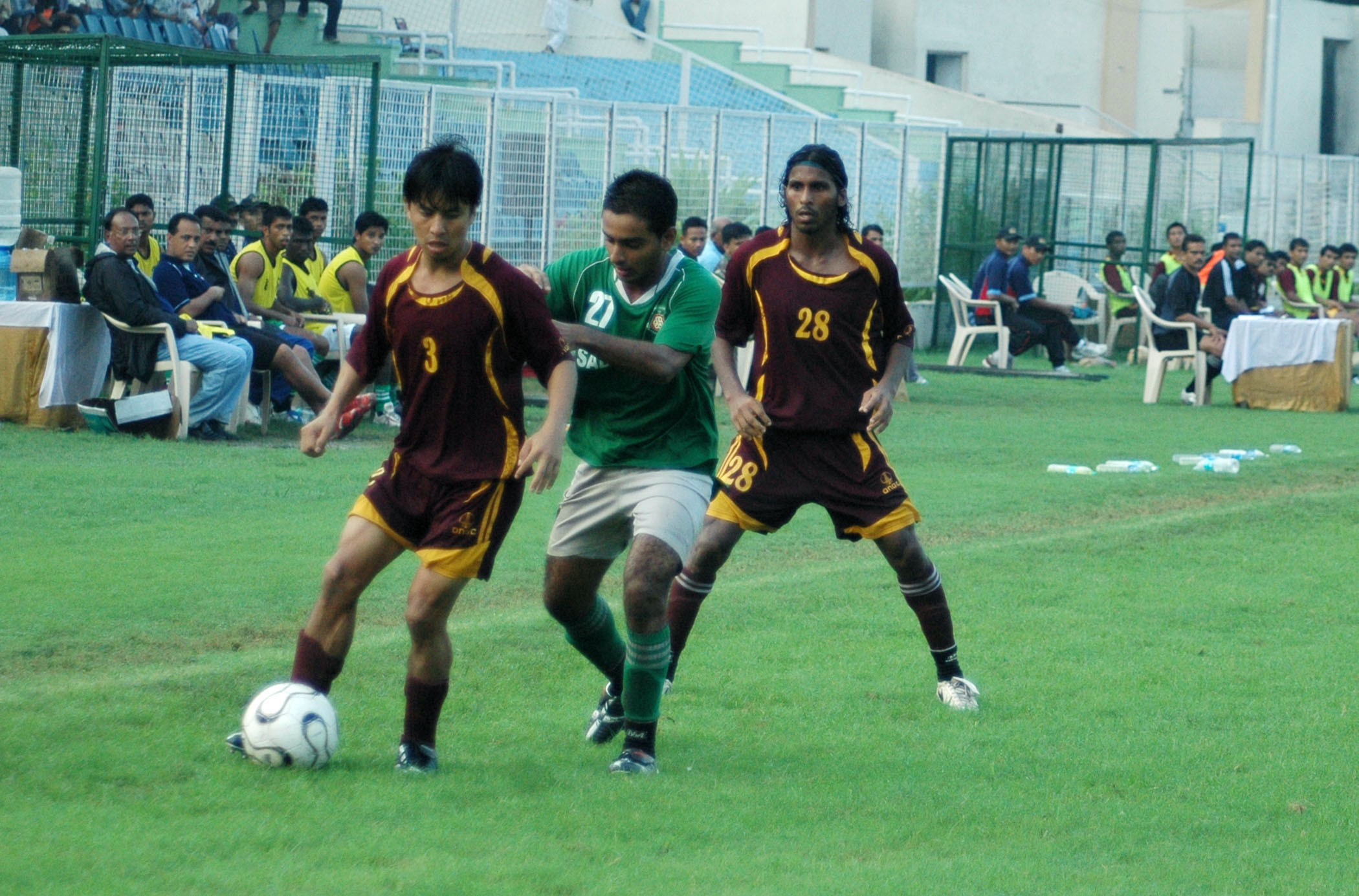
ONGC players in maroon, in action during a match in 2008.

In 2010, Caetano Pinho became the head coach of ONGC and helped the team winning the I-League 2nd Division and qualified for the 2010–11 season of I-League. Unfortunately, after one season in the I-League, the club were relegated back into the 2nd Division and Pinho's job was on the line as ONGC were considering folding the club. Even Pinho himself said: "The club's poor showing had not gone down well with the management, who it was believed were even considering the most extreme of repercussions. For a company which supports 16 different disciplines of sports around the country, they had after all pumped in the maximum amount of money into the football club's coffers."

=== 2010–2014: I-League and back ===
After earning promotion into the I-League, ONGC made some unexpected signings with the signatures of Nigerian playmaker David Opara and re-signing striker Badmus Babatunde, who was the overall top-scorer during the 2010 I-League 2nd Division, and signing former India national football team goalkeeper Rajat Ghosh Dastidar. ONGC played their first match of the 2010–11 on 4 December 2010 against East Bengal at the Salt Lake Stadium, in which they lost 1–0. It took the club register first win till 9 January 2011 against Viva Kerala at home with David Opara scoring the lone goal for ONGC. Then on 12 February 2011, ONGC created the biggest shock of the season after defeating East Bengal, who were undefeated before the game, 1–0 with Babatunde scoring in 58th minute at Cooperage Ground. Despite the unexpected result, ONGC could only do so much as despite scoring 11 more goals in the 2nd half of the season, they ultimately finished on last 14th place, which meant straight relegation back into 2nd Division after only one season.

ONGC began their mission for a comeback to the I-League by entering the 2012 I-League 2nd Division. The immediately made an impact after finishing the group stage in first place and entered the final round as automatic contenders. After a tough 12 matches in Siliguri and Sikkim, ONGC again finished in a promotion spot, second place, and thus qualified for the 2012–13 I-League, which was confirmed on 17 April 2012, after the club drew 1–1 with Aizawl. Santosh Kashyap managed the club in 2012–13 I-League. ONGC finished the next I-League season on 9th position with 31 points in 26 matches.

The club has also participated in the 2013 IFA Shield unlikely. On 4 March 2013, it was announced that Muktijoddha Sangsad of Bangladesh would not participate in this tournament and instead current I-League club ONGC would take their place. But they failed to qualify for the knockout stages. In 2014, they participated in the 14th Darjeeling Gold Cup and won the tournament with a 5–0 win over Dalhousie AC of Kolkata in final.

=== Sikkim Gold Cup win ===
In October 2014, ONGC participated in Sikkim Governor's Gold and reached to the final with a 2–1 win over Gangtok Himalayan. They clinched the trophy defeating Manang Marshyangdi Club of Nepal on penalty shoot-out.

=== In leagues of Mumbai ===
Since their inception, ONGC became a member of Western India Football Association (WIFA) and Mumbai District Football Association (formerly BDFA). They participated in later editions of Mumbai Harwood League alongside Maharashtra Football League.

Before getting revived in 2006, they participated in B.D.F.A League, and W.I.F.A. Super Division from 1990 to 1999 and clinched BDFA title in 1993. ONGC also participated in MDFA Elite Division, and lifted trophies in 2015–16 and 2017–18 season.

== Expulsion ==
In spite of finishing 9th in the 2012–13 I-League table with 36 points, ONGC were excluded from the next season, because they did not meet the AFC's club licensing criteria. New club Oil India has taken sponsorship and majority of ONGC's squad in the following years.

== Stadium ==
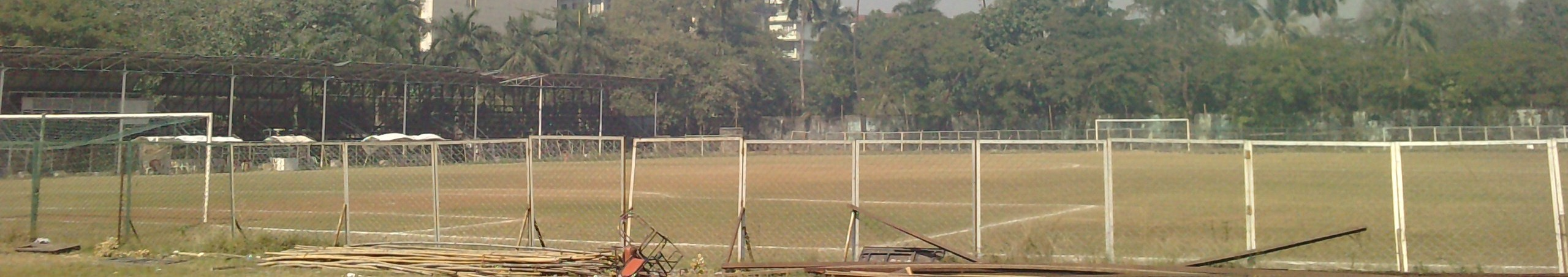
Cooperage Ground before renovation

ONGC played all their home matches for National Football League and I-League at the Cooperage Ground, which is located at the Nariman Point, Mumbai. It has a capacity of 5,000.

During the 2010–11 I-League season, Rajarshi Shahu Stadium in Kolhapur, hosted numerous matches of Mumbai teams due to unavailability of Cooperage Ground. ONGC played its home games at this ground throughout the season.

== Notable players ==
For all former notable players of ONGC FC with a Wikipedia article, see: ONGC FC players.

== Honours ==
=== League ===
- I-League 2nd Division
  - Champions (2): 2010, 2012
- Mumbai Football League/MDFA Elite Division
  - Champions (4): 1993, 2011–12, 2015–16, 2017–18
  - Runners-up (1): 2016–17

=== Cup ===
- Sikkim Governor's Gold Cup
  - Champions (2): 2010, 2014
- Bordoloi Trophy
  - Runners-up (1): 2007
- Durand Cup
  - Runners-up (1): 2013
- Kalinga Cup
  - Champions (1): 2014
- Darjeeling Gold Cup
  - Champions (1): 2014
- All-India Petroleum Sports Control Board Inter-unit Championship
  - Champions (8): 1998, 1999, 2000, 2003, 2004, 2005, 2008, 2009
  - Runners-up (1): 2007
- All-India Public Sector Football Tournament
  - Champions (1): 2010
- YMFC Centennial All India Football Tournament
  - Champions (1): 2016
- Nadkarni Cup
  - Champions (1): 2014
  - Runners-up (1): 2007
- Gadhinglaj United Cup
  - Champions (1): 2016
  - Runners-up (1): 2015
- ONGC Invitational Trophy
  - Champions (1): 2016
- YMFC Centennial All India Cup
  - Champions (1): 2016
- Hot Weather Football Championship
  - Runners-up (1): 2007
- All-India Ballarpur Industries Limited Trophy
  - Runners-up (2): 2001–02, 2002
- Principal Harbhajan Singh Memorial All-India Cup
  - Runners-up (1): 2018

== Team records ==
=== Notable win against foreign team ===
Competition	Round	Year	Opposition	Score	Venue	City	Ref
Bordoloi Trophy	Semi-final	2007	(Bangladesh) Abahani Limited Dhaka	0–0 (5–4 p)	Jawaharlal Nehru Stadium	Guwahati	
Sikkim Governor's Gold Cup	Semi-final	2011	(Nepal) Manang Marshyangdi	1–0	Paljor Stadium	Gangtok	
Sikkim Governor's Gold Cup	Final	2014	(Nepal) Manang Marshyangdi	2–2 (2–0 p)	Paljor Stadium	Gangtok	

== Other departments ==
=== Cricket ===
Club's cricket team competes in the Maharaja Padam Singh Cricket Tournament and other regional competitions affiliated to the Delhi & District Cricket Association. Noted Indian international players Gautam Gambhir, Praveen Kumar, Ishan Kishan, Tanmay Srivastava, and other first class players like Sandeep Sharma, Mithun Manhas, Taruwar Kohli, Unmukt Chand, and Sumit Narwal appeared with the team in domestic tournaments.

Honours

- Lala Raghubir Trophy
  - Champions (1): 2012
- Maharaja Padam Singh Cricket Tournament
  - Champions (1): 2013
- DDCA Hot Weather Championship
  - Champions (1): 2013
- DY Patil T-20 Trophy
  - Runners-up (1): 2016

=== Field hockey ===
ONGC has its field hockey team. It previously competed in Beighton Cup, one of world's oldest hockey tournaments. They finished as runners-up in the prestigious trophy in 2011 and 2013. Affiliated with the Bombay Hockey Association, ONGC also appeared in Bombay Gold Cup and Guru Tegh Bahadur Gold Cup.

Honours

- Beighton Cup
  - Runners-up (2): 2011, 2013
- Guru Tegh Bahadur Gold Cup
  - Runners-up (1): 2010
- Surjit Memorial Hockey Tournament
  - Runners-up (1): 2017
- Senior Nehru Hockey Tournament
  - Champions (1): 2011
  - Runners-up (1): 2010
- UP Hockey Championship
  - Champions (1): 2013–14
- PSPB Hockey Tournament
  - Champions (1): 2014
- Murugappa Gold Cup
  - Champions (1): 2017
- AIPSSPB Hockey Trophy
  - Champions (1): 2018
- Inter-Unit PSPB hockey tournament
  - Champions (1): 2018

=== Volleyball ===
ONGC operates men's volleyball team, that participates in domestic state and national level tournaments. In 2011, ONGC clinched IOB Platinum Jubilee National Volleyball Championship title, and qualified to represent India at the Asian Club Volleyball Championships in China.

Honours

- IOB Platinum Jubilee National Volleyball Championship
  - Champions (1): 2011
- All India Public-Sector Volleyball Championship
  - Champions (2): 2015, 2019
- All-India Volleyball Championship
  - Champions (1): 2017
- PSPB Inter-Unit Volleyball Tournament
  - Champions (1): 2014
  - Runners-up (1): 2019–20
- Chand Agarwala Memorial National Volleyball Championship
  - Runners-up (1): 2003

=== Basketball ===
ONGC operates men's basketball teams.

Honours

- Federation Cup Basketball Championship
  - Champions (1): 2013–14
- JCI All India Basketball Tournament
  - Champions (1): 2013

=== Kabaddi ===
Club's kabaddi team competes in the PSPB Inter-unit Kabaddi Tournament and other regional tournaments.

Honours

- PSPB Inter-unit Kabaddi Tournament
  - Champions (1): 2013

=== Athletics ===
ONGC has men's athletics division, and operating teams competing in the Open National Athletic Championship. At the 52nd Open National Athletic Championship held in Chennai in September 2012, the team finished at third position with 6 gold, 3 silver and 10 bronze medals. In December 2013, the team clinched All India Public Sector Athletics Meet title, which was hosted at the Maharaja College Ground in Kochi. ONGC also won the Federation Cup Athletic Championship in 2013.

== See also ==
- Sports in Maharashtra
- List of football clubs in Mumbai
- Oil India FC
