= Mumbai Football League =

Regional association football league in India

- Organising body: Mumbai Football Association (MFA)
- Founded: 1902; 124 years ago (as Harwood League)
- Country: India
- Divisions: 5
- Number of clubs: 100+
- Level on pyramid: 1–6
- Promotion to: Various
- Relegation to: Various
- Domestic cup: Rovers Cup (formerly)
- League cup: Nadkarni Cup

The Mumbai Football League, also known as the Harwood League, is organised by the Mumbai Football Association (MFA), as a ladder-based competition involving a total of five divisions and over 300 teams. It is the top football league in Mumbai and the second-oldest football league in Asia after Calcutta Football League.

The league was named after colonel Harwood who founded the Bombay Football Association and became first president.

== Structure ==
Maharashtra State League
Tier	Division
1 _{(Maharashtra football pyramid)}	Maharashtra State Senior Men's Football League _{↑promote (I-League 3) ↓relegate}
Mumbai Football League
1 _{(Mumbai football pyramid)}	Mumbai Premier League _{↑promote ↓relegate}
2 _{(Mumbai football pyramid)}	Mumbai Super League _{↑promote ↓relegate}
3 _{(Mumbai football pyramid)}	MFA First Division Championship _{↑promote ↓relegate}
4 _{(Mumbai football pyramid)}	MFA Second Division Championship _{↑promote ↓relegate}
5 _{(Mumbai football pyramid)}	MFA Third Division Championship _{↑promote}

== Maharashtra State Senior Men's Football League ==
Maharashtra State Senior Men's Football League
- Organising body: Western India Football Association
- Founded: 2025; 1 year ago
- Country: India
- Number of clubs: 8 (2024–25)
- Level on pyramid: 1 (Maharasthra football pyramid)
- Promotion to: I-League 3
- Relegation to: Mumbai Premier League; Pune Football League; District leagues
- Domestic cup: Nadkarni Cup
- Current champions: Magic Made Soccer (2025)
- Website: https://wifa.in/
- Current: 2026

== Mumbai Premier League ==
Mumbai Premier League, formerly known as the MFA Elite Division or MDFA Elite Division, is the first tier of the Mumbai Football League competition. In March 2022, the Mumbai Premier League was rechristened as the Harwood Premier League, on the lines of the name that was once associated with the Mumbai's top division football, stretching back to 1902.

== Mumbai Super League ==
The Mumbai Super League, formerly known as the MFA Super Division or MDFA Super Division, is the second tier of the Mumbai Football League competition, organized by the Mumbai District Football Association. The top two teams from super six of the Mumbai Super League get promoted to the Mumbai Premier League. The last-placed teams in the groups get relegated to the First Division. It is contested by 37 teams. The current champions are Mumbai City U19 and India on Track are runners-up.

Mumbai Super League
- Organising body: Mumbai Football Association (MFA)
- Country: India
- Number of clubs: 47
- Level on pyramid: 3
- Promotion to: Mumbai Premier League
- Relegation to: MFA First Division Championship
- League cup: Nadkarni Cup
- Current champions: Mumbai City U19
- Website: Mumbai Super League
- Current: 2025–26 Mumbai Super League

=== Format ===
All the 37 teams are divided into three groups. Two groups with 12 teams and one with 13. The top two teams from each group will advance to the playoffs (super six). The points and goals scored in the preliminary phase will not be carried forward to the next round. The top two teams at the end of the league will be promoted to the Mumbai Premier League.

== First Division Championship ==
MFA First Division Championship
- Organising body: Mumbai Football Association (MFA)
- Level on pyramid: 4
- Promotion to: Mumbai Super League
- Relegation to: MFA Second Division Championship
- League cup: Nadkarni Cup
- Website: MFA First Division Championship

1. All the teams in the division will be divided into five groups and shall play a preliminary phase of round-robin games.
2. The top two teams from each group will advance to the post-season playoffs.
3. The points and goals scored in the preliminary phase will not be carried forward to the next round.
4. The team standing first and second after the completion of the round-robin playoff league shall be declared the winner and runner-up and will be promoted to the Super Division.
5. The teams in last place in each group after the completion of the preliminary league will be demoted to the Division Two.

== Second Division Championship ==
MFA Second Division Championship
- Organising body: Mumbai Football Association (MFA)
- Level on pyramid: 5
- Promotion to: MFA First Division Championship
- Relegation to: MFA Third Division Championship
- League cup: Nadkarni Cup
- Website: MFA Second Division Championship

1. All the teams in the division will be divided into six or more groups and shall play a preliminary phase of round-robin games.
2. The top two teams from each group will advance to the post-season playoffs.
3. The points and goals scored in the preliminary phase will not be carried forward to the next round.
4. The post season playoffs will include a league phase followed by a single-leg knock out format to decide who will contest the Division Two final.
5. All eight quarter-finalists will be promoted to the Division One

== Third Division Championship ==
MFA Third Division Championship
- Organising body: Mumbai Football Association (MFA)
- Level on pyramid: 6
- Promotion to: MFA Second Division Championship
- League cup: Nadkarni Cup
- Website: MFA Third Division Championship

1. All the teams in the division will be divided into eight or more groups and shall play a preliminary phase of round-robin games.
2. The top two/three teams from each group will advance to the post-season playoffs.
3. The points and goals scored in the preliminary phase will not be carried forward to the next round.
4. The post season playoffs will include a league phase followed by a single-leg knock out format to decide who will contest the Division Three final.

== Champions ==
Year	Champion	Note
1902	(United Kingdom) Oxfordshire Light Infantry	
1903	(United Kingdom) Royal Garrison Artillery	
1904	(United Kingdom) Cheshire Regiment	
1905	(United Kingdom) Yorkshire Regiment	
1906	(United Kingdom) Royal Scots	
1907	(United Kingdom) Royal Scots	
1908	(United Kingdom) Royal Scots	
1909	(United Kingdom) Gloucestershire Regiment	
1910	(United Kingdom) Royal Garrison Artillery	
1911	(United Kingdom) Royal Warwickshire Regiment	
1912	(British Raj) Royal Army Temperance Association	
1913	(United Kingdom) Sherwood Foresters	
1914	(United Kingdom) Sherwood Foresters	
1915	(United Kingdom) Royal Garrison Artillery	
1916–1920	None	Not held
1921	(United Kingdom) King's Shropshire Light Infantry	
1922	(United Kingdom) King's Shropshire Light Infantry	
1923	(United Kingdom) Royal Inniskilling Fusiliers	
1924	(United Kingdom) West Yorkshire Regiment	
1925	(United Kingdom) West Yorkshire Regiment	
1926	(United Kingdom) South Staffordshire Regiment	
1927	(United Kingdom) Cheshire Regiment	
1928	(United Kingdom) Royal Ulster Rifles	
1929	(United Kingdom) Royal Warwickshire Regiment	
1930	(United Kingdom) Duke of Wellington's Regiment	
1931	(United Kingdom) Duke of Wellington's Regiment	
1932	(United Kingdom) King's Own Scottish Borderers	
1933	(United Kingdom) Royal Irish Fusiliers	
1934	(British Raj) Royal Artillery (Colaba)	
1935	(United Kingdom) Durham Light Infantry	
1936	(United Kingdom) Durham Light Infantry	
1937	(United Kingdom) Cheshire Regiment	
1938	(United Kingdom) Cheshire Regiment	
1939	(United Kingdom) South Lancashire Regiment	
1940	(United Kingdom) Welch Regiment	
1941	(British Raj) Y.M.C.A.	
1942	(British Raj) Western India Automobile Association Staff	First native club to win the league.
1943	(British Raj) Western India Automobile Association Staff	
1944	(British Raj) Embarkation Headquarters	
1945	(British Raj) Tata Sports Club	
1946	(British Raj) Trades India Sports Club	
1947	Trades India Sports Club	
1948	Tata Sports Club	
1949	Trades India Sports Club	
1950	Tata Sports Club	
1951	India Culture League	
1952	India Culture League	
1953	Tata Sports Club	
1954	Indian Navy	
1955	None	Abandoned
1956	Burmah-Shell Sports Club	
1957	Indian Navy	
1958	Tata Sports Club	
1959	Western Railway SC	
1960	Tata Sports Club	
1961	Tata Sports Club	
1962	Western Railway SC	
1963	Central Railway SC	
1964	Tata Sports Club	
1965	Central Railway SC	
1966	Tata Sports Club	
1967	Tata Sports Club	
1968	Mafatlal Group	
1969	Mafatlal Group	
1970	Mahindra & Mahindra	
1971	Mafatlal Group	
1972	Mafatlal Group	
1973	Tata Sports Club	
1974–75	Tata Sports Club	
1975–76	Mafatlal Group	
1976	Mafatlal Group	
1977	Orkay Mills	
1978–79	Mafatlal Group	
1979	Tata Sports Club	
1980	Orkay Mills	
1981	Century Rayon FC	
1982	Mahindra & Mahindra	
1983	Mafatlal Mills	
1984	Mahindra & Mahindra	
1985	Mahindra & Mahindra	
1986	Bank of India (Mumbai)	
1987	Rashtriya Chemicals and Fertilisers (RCF)	
1988	Orkay Mills	
1989	Union Bank of India	
Two separate leagues ran in competition to each other. The BDFA league retained the right to use the name "Harwood League", while the best teams eventually migrated to the WIFA league.
1990–99	WIFA League, Super Division	BDFA/MDFA League (The Harwood League)
1990	Bank of India (Mumbai)	Rashtriya Chemicals and Fertilisers (RCF)
1991	Central Bank	United Boys (Sahar)
1992	Air India	Central Railway SC
1993	Bank of India (Mumbai)	ONGC (Oil & Natural Gas Commission)
1994	Air India	Carmelites SC
1995	Mahindra & Mahindra	Central Railway SC
1996	Air India	Royal Caterers
1997	Air India	Abandoned
1998	Bengal Mumbai	Village Amboli
1999	Air India	unknown (Holy Family/Chembur English/Rhino)
In 2000, the two leagues merged when MDFA and WIFA resolved their various disputes. The resultant league has since been run by the MDFA (affiliated to WIFA), with the restored title of The Harwood League.
Mumbai Football League Elite Division / Mumbai Premier League
2000	Mahindra United	
2001–02	Mahindra United	
2002	Mahindra United	
2003	Mahindra United	
2004	Mahindra United	
2005	Maharashtra State Police	
2006–07	Mahindra United	
2007–08	Mahindra United	
2008–09	Mahindra United	
2009–10	Air India	
2010–11	Mumbai	
2011–12	ONGC	
2012–13	None	Not held
2013–14	Air India	
2014–15	Air India	
2015–16	ONGC	
2016–17	Air India	
2017–18	ONGC	
2018–19	Mumbai Customs	
2019–20	Karnataka Sporting Association (KSA)	
2020–21	None	Cancelled due to COVID-19 pandemic in India
2021–22	Ambernath United Atlanta	
2022–23	Ambernath United Atlanta	
2023–24	MYJ–GMSC	
2024–25	India On Track FC	
Source: Mumbai (Bombay) League champions

== See also ==
- Western India Football Association
- Mumbai Football Association
- Rovers Cup
- Nadkarni Cup
- Pune Football League
