= Rashtriya Chemicals and Fertilizers =

Indian central public sector undertaking

Rashtriya Chemicals and Fertilizers Limited
- Type: Public
- Traded as: BSE: 524230; NSE: RCF
- Industry: Agrochemical
- Founded: 1978; 48 years ago
- Headquarters: Mumbai, Maharashtra, India
- Key people: S. C. Mudgerikar (Chairman & MD)
- Products: Urea; Ammonia
- Revenue: ▲₹16,933.64 crore (US$1.8 billion) (2025)
- Operating income: ▲₹912 crore (US$95 million) (2021–22)
- Net income: ▲₹680 crore (US$71 million) (2021–22)
- Total assets: ▲₹10,472 crore (US$1.1 billion) (2021–22)
- Total equity: ▲₹3,338.47 crore (US$350 million) (2020–21)
- Owner: Government of India (75%)
- Number of employees: 2556(July 2023)
- Website: www.rcfltd.com

Rashtriya Chemicals and Fertilizers Ltd. (RCF) is an Indian central public sector undertaking which produces chemical and fertilizers and is based in Mumbai. It is under the ownership of the Government of India and administrative control of the Ministry of Chemicals and Fertilizers. RCF is fourth largest government owned-fertilizer-producer in India.

== History ==
Rashtriya Chemicals and Fertilizers Limited, was established in 1978 consequent to the reorganisation of Fertilizer Corporation of India. RCF manufactures Urea and Complex fertilizers (NPK) along with a wide range of Industrial Chemicals. It is 4th largest Urea manufacturer in India after IFFCO, NFL and KRIBHCO.

The Government of India (through the President of India) holds 75% of the share capital of the company as of December 2018.
