= Western India Football Association =

State governing body of Football in Maharashtra

- Sport: Football
- Jurisdiction: Maharashtra
- Membership: 36 district associations
- Abbreviation: WIFA
- Founded: 1902; 124 years ago (as Bombay Football Association)
- Affiliation: All India Football Federation (AIFF)
- Headquarters: Mumbai
- President: Praful Patel
- Secretary: Souter Vaz

Official website
- wifa.in

The Western India Football Association, abbreviated as WIFA, is the governing body for football in the Indian state of Maharashtra. It is affiliated with the All India Football Federation, the sports national governing body. The WIFA sends state teams for Santosh Trophy and Rajmata Jijabai Trophy.

== History ==
The Bombay Football Association was established in the Bombay province of 1902. It was amalgamated with the older Rovers Football Cup Committee to form the Western India Football Association on 12 July 1911. Justice Russel became president of the WIFA while P. R. Cadell became vice-president, and the objective of was to improve the sport of football in the Bombay state, and in the present-day Maharashtra. Before that, football games were organised for the Rovers Cup, which is India's second oldest football tournament started in 1890.

Then in 2011, after the sudden rise in the popularity of football in India, WIFA decided to revamp the Maharashtra Football System. The first thing they decided to do was renovate Mumbai's only national football stadium, the Cooperage Ground. After that they will work on starting the first ever statewide football league in Maharashtra known as the Maha League. They also announced plans to revive the Rovers Cup which had its last tournament in 2001.

== State teams ==
=== Men ===
- Maharashtra football team
- Maharashtra under-20 football team
- Maharashtra under-15 football team
- Maharashtra under-13 football team

=== Women ===
- Maharashtra women's football team
- Maharashtra women's under-19 football team
- Maharashtra women's under-17 football team

== Affiliated district associations ==
All 36 district of Maharashtra are affiliated with the Western India Football Association.

No.	Association	District	Representative
1	Ahmednagar District Football Association	Ahmednagar	Narenda S. Firodia
2	Akola District Football Association	Akola	Shyam Sarjuprasad Awasthi
3	Amravati district Football Association	Amravati	Arun M. Jaiswal
4	Aurangabad district Football Association	Aurangabad	Ranjitsingh Bhardwa
5	Beed district Football Association	Beed	Amarsingh Pandit
6	Bhandara district Football Association	Bhandara	Ahmed Lalani
7	Buldhana district Football Association	Buldhana	S. S. Thakare
8	Chanda district Football Association	Chandrapur	K. K. Singh
9	Dhule district Football Association	Dhule	Amrishbhai Patel
10	Gadchiroli district Football Association	Gadchiroli	Ravindra Darekar
11	The Gondia District Football Association	Gondia	Praful Patel
12	Hingoli district Football Association	Hingoli	Ab Samad
13	Jalgaon district Football Association	Jalgaon	Ulhas Patil
14	Jalna district Football Association	Jalna	Kailash Gorantyal
15	Kolhapur Sports Association	Kolhapur	Malojiraje Chhatrapati
16	Latur district Football Association	Latur	Shaikh Nizamoddin
17	Mumbai Football Association	Mumbai City	Aaditya Thackeray
18	Mumbai Football Association	Mumbai Suburban	Aaditya Thackeray
19	The Nagpur District Football Association	Nagpur	Haresh K Vora
20	Nanded district Football Association	Nanded	Md. Sadique
21	Nandurbar district Football Association	Nandurbar	D.R.Patel
22	Football Association of Nashik district	Nashik	Dr. Anniruddha Dharmadhikari
23	Osmanabad District Haushi Football Association	Dharashiv	Sayyed Khalil Saif
24	Palghar district Football Association	Palghar	Parth Jindal
25	District Football Association Parbhani	Parbhani	Abdul Gaffar Master
26	Poona District Football Association	Pune	Vishwajeet Kadam
27	Raigad district Football Association	Raigad	Aadesh Bandekar
28	Football Association of Ratnagiri district	Ratnagiri	Prasad Pranjape
29	Sangli district Football Association	Sangli	Jaggu Sulaiman Sayed
30	Satara district Football Association	Satara	Dhananjay Jadhav
31	Sindhudurg district Football Association	Sindhudurg	Laxman Dalvi
32	Solapur City & District Football Association	Solapur	Mahesh Gadekar
33	Thane Football Association	Thane	Shrikant Shinde
34	District Football Association Wardha	Wardha	Anand Kalokar
35	Washim district Football Association	Washim	K.M.Azhar Hussain
36	Yavatmal district Football Association	Yavatmal	Indranil Naik

== Competitions ==
=== District level ===
==== Men's ====
- WIFA Inter-District Men’s Championship

==== Men's youth ====
- WIFA Inter-District Junior Boys Championship
- WIFA Inter-District Sub-Junior Boys Championship

==== Women's ====
- WIFA Inter-District Women’s Championship

==== Women's youth ====
- WIFA Inter-District Junior Girls Championship
- WIFA Inter-District Sub-Junior Girls Championship

=== Club level ===
==== Men's ====
- Maharashtra State Senior Men's Football League

==== Men's youth ====
- WIFA Under-18 Youth League
- WIFA Under-15 Youth League
- WIFA Under-13 Youth League

==== Women's ====
- Maharashtra State Senior Women's Football League

==== Women's youth ====
- WIFA Under-18 Youth League
- WIFA Under-15 Youth League
- WIFA Under-13 Youth League

== Maharashtra Football League pyramid ==
=== Men's ===
Level	State leagues								
1	Maharashtra State Senior Men's Football League promotion (to I-League 3) ↑↓ relegation								
	District leagues								
	District level	Mumbai city and suburban	Pune	Nagpur	Kolhapur	Thane	Aurangabad	Nashik	Palghar
2	1	Mumbai Premier League ↑promote ↓relegate	PDFA Super Division League ↑promote ↓relegate	NDFA Elite Division League ↑promote ↓relegate	Kolhapur Senior League ↑promote	Thane Super Division ↑promote	Aurangabad Football League ↑promote	Nashik Football League ↑promote	Palghar Football League ↑promote
3	2	Mumbai Super League ↑promote ↓relegate	PDFA First Division League ↑promote ↓relegate	NDFA Super Division League ↑promote ↓relegate	1 divisions				
4	3	MFA First Division ↑promote ↓relegate	PDFA Second Division League ↑promote ↓relegate	NDFA Senior Division League ↑promote	1 divisions				
5	4	MFA Second Division ↑promote ↓relegate	PDFA Third Division League ↑promote	3 divisions	1 divisions				
6	5	MFA Third Division ↑promote	4 divisions	3 divisions	1 divisions				

=== Women's ===
Level	State leagues					
1	Maharashtra State Senior Women's Football League promotion (to Indian Women's League 2) ↑↓ relegation					
	District leagues					
	District level	Mumbai city and suburban	Pune	Kolhapur	Thane	Palghar
2	1	Women's Premier League ↑promote ↓relegate	PDFA Women's Division ↑promote	Kolhapur Women's League ↑promote	Thane District Women’s League ↑promote	Palghar DFA Women's League ↑promote
3	2	Women's Super League ↑promote	1 division			

== Management ==
As of 2024

Office	Name
President	Praful Patel
Vice-president(s)	Haresh Vora
Vice-president(s)	Malojiraje Chhatrapati
Vice-president(s)	Vishwajeet Kadam
Vice-president(s)	Shrikant Shinde
Vice-president(s)	Sunil Dhande
Secretary	Kiran Chougule
Assistant Secretary(s)	Sushilkumar Surve
Assistant Secretary(s)	Khaja Ansari
Assistant Secretary(s)	Ahmed Lalani
Treasurer	Salim Parkote

== See also ==
- List of Indian state football associations
- Football in India
- Mumbai Football Association
