= PIFA Sports FC =

Indian association football club based in Mumbai

PIFA Sports
- Full name: PIFA Sports FC
- Nickname(s): Mumbai's Pride
- Short name: PSFC
- Founded: 2006; 19 years ago
- Ground: Cooperage Ground
- Capacity: 5,000
- Owner: PIFA Sports Private Limited
- Chairman: Nirvan Shah
- Head coach: Anjali Shah
- League: MFA Elite Division

PIFA Sports Football Club, or simply PIFA, is an Indian professional football club based in Mumbai, Maharashtra that competes in the Mumbai Football League, They also participated in I-League 2.

== Players ==
=== 2019 senior team squad ===
As of 1 January 2019

Note: Flags indicate national team as defined under FIFA eligibility rules; some limited exceptions apply. Players may hold more than one non-FIFA nationality.

| No. | Pos. | Nation | Player |
|---|---|---|---|
| 1 | GK | (India) IND | Tejas Jadhav |
| 2 | DF | (India) IND | Andreas D'Souza |
| 3 | DF | (India) IND | Parth Shetty |
| 4 | MF | (India) IND | Satish Tevar |
| 5 | DF | (India) IND | Vaibhav Tandel |
| 6 | DF | (India) IND | Omkar Dalvi |
| 7 | MF | (India) IND | Gaurav Shinde |
| 8 | DF | (India) IND | Divyanshu Patil |
| 9 | MF | (India) IND | Ravi Bagdi |
| 10 | FW | (India) IND | Omkar Shinde |
| 11 | MF | (India) IND | Aloysius Fernandes |

| No. | Pos. | Nation | Player |
|---|---|---|---|
| 15 | MF | (India) IND | Anant Gadekar |
| 16 | FW | (India) IND | Ivan Reddy |
| 17 | FW | (India) IND | Kaiwalya Tare |
| 18 | MF | (India) IND | Chetan Tandel |
| 19 | MF | (India) IND | Vandan Meher |
| 20 | FW | (India) IND | Lalit Patil |
| 21 | FW | (India) IND | Akash Valmiki |
| 23 | DF | (India) IND | Neel Shah |
| 24 | DF | (India) IND | Kalpesh Nijap |
| 12 | DF | (India) IND | Anderson M. |
| 30 | GK | (India) IND | Faiz Thakkar |

== Honours ==
=== Men's team ===
- Nadkarni Cup
  - Runners-up (3): 2011, 2016, 2017

=== Women's team ===
- WIFA Women's Football League
  - Champions (1): 2021–22
  - Runners-up (1): 2022–23
