= Central Bank of India =

Indian public sector bank

- Central to You Since 1911

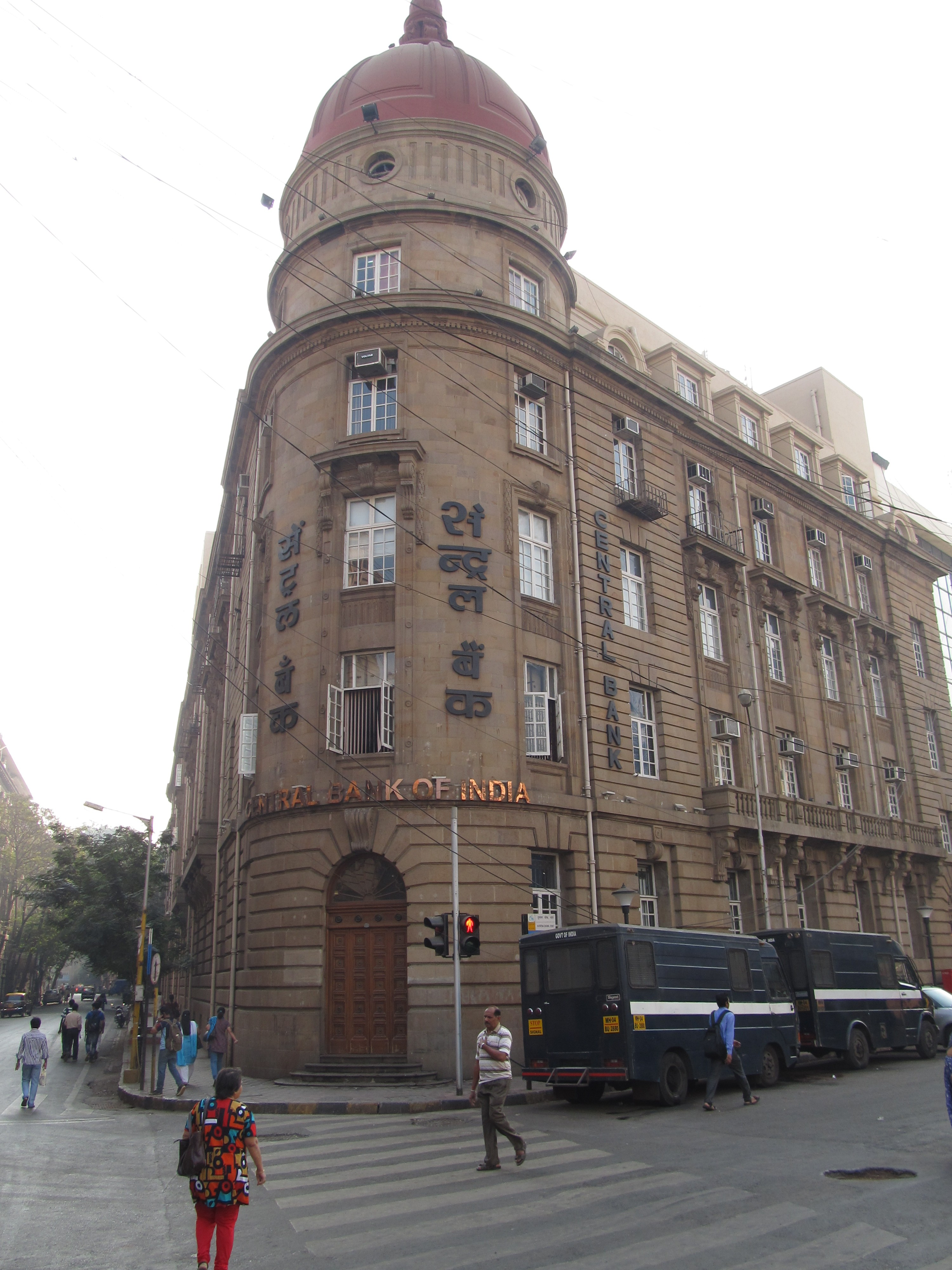
- Type: Public
- Traded as: BSE: 532885; NSE: CENTRALBK
- Industry: Banking; Financial services
- Founded: 21 December 1911; 114 years ago
- Headquarters: Mumbai, Maharashtra, India
- Number of locations: 4,622 branches and 3,820 ATMs (30 September 2026)
- Key people: Kalyan Kumar (MD & CEO)
- Revenue: ▲₹42,342 crore (US$4.4 billion) (2026)
- Operating income: ▲₹8,479 crore (US$880 million) (2026)
- Net income: ▲₹4,369 crore (US$450 million) (2026)
- Total assets: ▲₹549,480 crore (US$57 billion) (2026)
- Total equity: ▲₹34,599.72 crore (US$3.6 billion) (2026)
- Owner: Ministry of Finance, Government of India (81.19%, June 2026)
- Number of employees: 33,997 (2026)
- Parent: Government of India
- Capital ratio: 17.68% (September 2026)
- Website: centralbank.bank.in

The Central Bank of India (CBI) is an Indian public sector bank headquartered in Mumbai. Established on 21 December 1911. Despite its name, CBI is not the central bank of India, a role served by the Reserve Bank of India.

== History ==
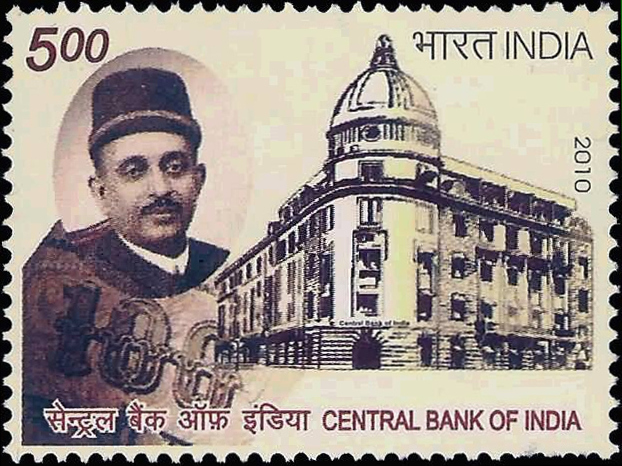
A 2010 stamp dedicated to Sorabji Pochkhanawala and the 100th anniversary of the Central Bank of India

The Central Bank of India was established on 21 December 1911 by Sir Sorabji Pochkhanawala with Sir Pherozeshah Mehta as chairman, and it was the first commercial Indian bank completely owned, operated and managed by Indians.

=== Early-20th century ===
By 1918, the Central Bank of India had established a branch in Hyderabad. A branch in nearby Secunderabad followed in 1925.

In 1923, it acquired the Tata Industrial Bank in the wake of the failure of the Alliance Bank of Simla. The Tata Bank, established in 1917, had opened a branch in Madras in 1920 that became the Central Bank of India, Madras.

The Central Bank of India was instrumental in the creation of the first Indian exchange bank, the Central Exchange Bank of India, which opened in London in 1936. However, Barclays Bank acquired Central Exchange Bank of India in 1938.

Also, before World War II, the Central Bank of India established a branch in Rangoon. The branch's operations concentrated on business between Burma and India, especially money transfers conducted via telegraph. Profits were derived primarily from the margins on foreign exchange. The bank also provided loans accepting assets such as land, produce or other goods as collateral. Most of the banks customers were Indian businesses.

=== Post-World War II ===
In 1963, the revolutionary government in Burma nationalized the Central Bank of India's operations there, which became People's Bank No. 1.

In 1969, the Indian Government nationalized the bank on 19 July, together with 13 others.

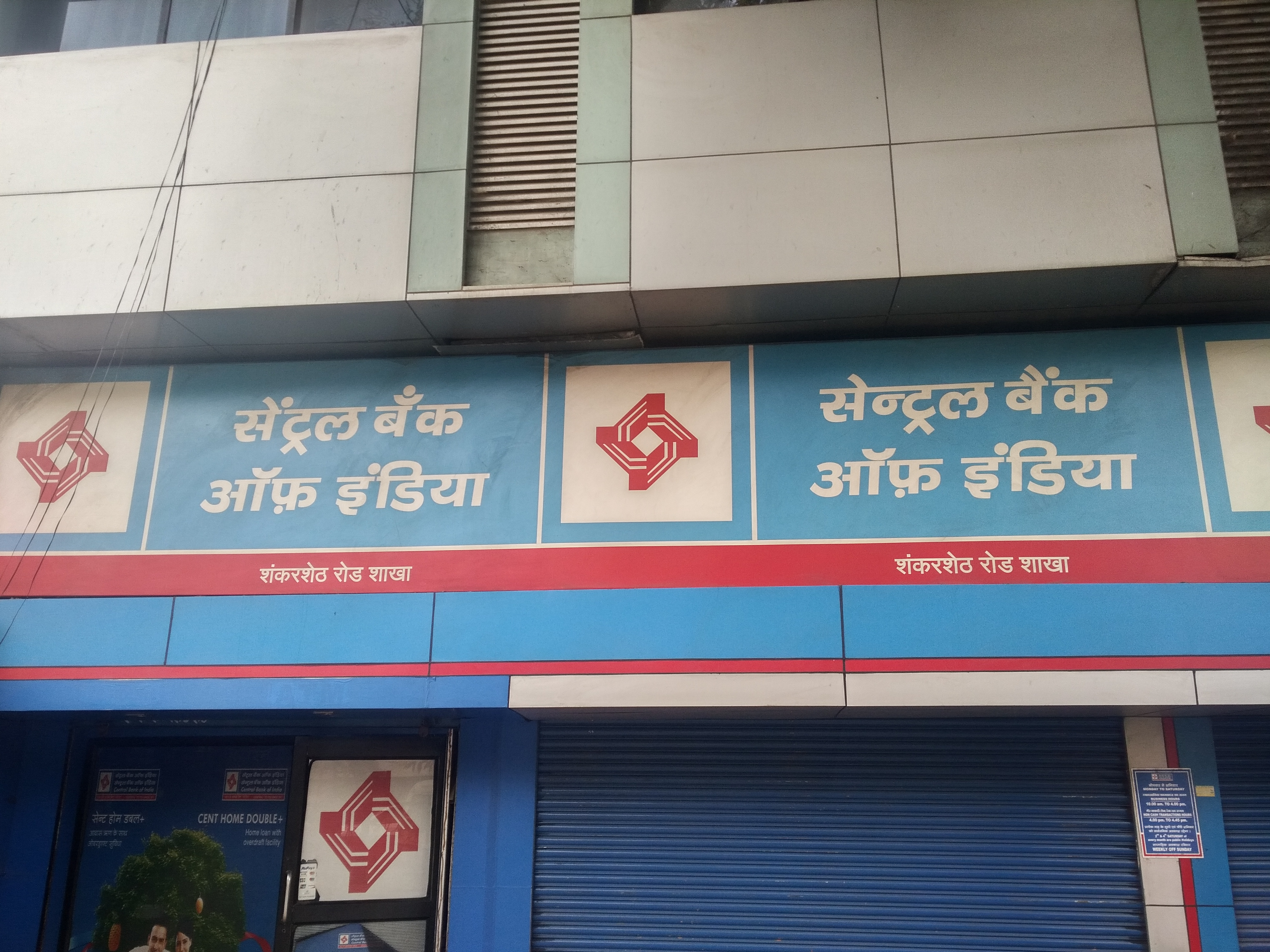
Nameboard of Central Bank of India, Shankar Sheth Road Branch, Pune.

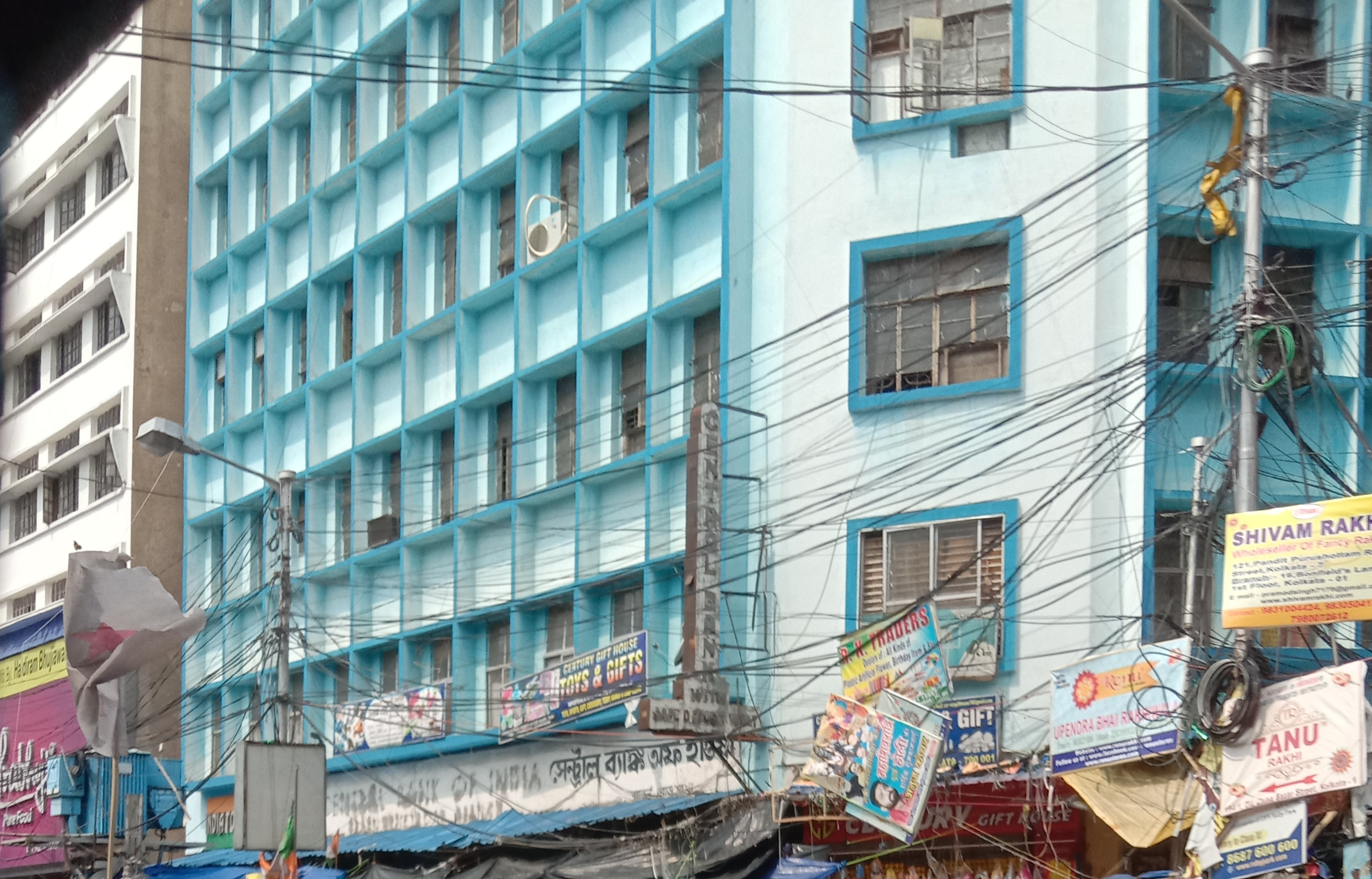
Central Bank of India, Brabourne Road Branch (in blue), in Kolkata.

Central Bank of India was one of the first banks in India to issue credit cards in the year 1980 in collaboration with Visa.

On its 108th Foundation Day, the Central Bank of India launched its first step towards robotic banking, a robot named "MEDHA".

CBI is one of twelve public sector banks in India that were recapitalised in 2009.

As of 31 March 2021, the bank has a network of 4,608 branches, 3,644 ATMs, ten satellite offices, and one extension counter. It has a pan-India presence covering all 28 states, seven out of eight union territories, and 574 district headquarters out of all districts in the country.

RBI's prompt corrective action (PCA) came out last in the public sector in 2022. The PCA framework blocked large loans, restricted dividend payments, and restricted expenses.

In 2024, Central Bank of India Governor MV Rao became chairman of the Indian Banks Association.

== Subsidiaries ==
- Centbank Financial Services Limited, wholly owned subsidiary of Central Bank of India
- Cent Bank Home Finance. As on 31st March, 2025, the CBI holds 64% stake.

== Controversies ==
In the 1980s, the managers of the London branches of Central Bank of India, Punjab National Bank, and Union Bank of India were caught up in a fraud in which they made dubious loans to the Bangladeshi jute trader Rajender Singh Sethia. The regulatory authorities in England and India forced all three Indian banks to close their London branches.

== Cited sources ==
- Turnell, Sean (2009) Fiery Dragons: Banks, Moneylenders and Microfinance in Burma. (NAIS Press). ISBN 9788776940409
