= Mumbai Football Association =

Mumbai Football Association (Mumbai District Football Association)
- Sport: Football
- Jurisdiction: Mumbai City district & Mumbai Suburban district
- Abbreviation: MFA, MDFA
- Founded: 1983; 43 years ago
- Affiliation: All India Football Federation (AIFF)
- Regional affiliation: Western India Football Association
- Headquarters: Mumbai
- President: Aaditya Thackeray

Official website
- footballmfa.com

Mumbai Football Association (MFA), formerly known as Mumbai District Football Association (MDFA), is an organisation that governs the football in and around the Indian city of Mumbai. It is a member of the Western India Football Association, which is affiliated to the All India Football Federation (AIFF).

== History ==
The Mumbai Football Association (MFA), which is a non-profit organization, was established in 1983. From a beginning of 57 football clubs affiliated to it, the association now caters to and conducts football activity for more than 10,000 players. Mumbai had been a center of football on the western coast of India since the British rule. After the foundation of the Western India Football Association as a result of the merger between the Bombay Football Association and the Bombay Rovers Cup Committee in 1911, it conducted the Harwood Football League and the prestigious Rovers Cup, an all India tournament which has come as a legacy to MFA.

The MFA is managed by the Executive Council consisting of a president, 4 vice presidents, general secretary, treasurer, 4 assistant secretaries and 15 committee members. In addition to these, six members whose services would be beneficial to the association are also co-opted on the executive committee. The term of the executive Council is four years.

== Olympians and internationals of MFA ==
Mumbai has produced several Olympians and international players who have represented India. Two-time olympian S. S. Narayan served as the vice-president of the MFA. Other Olympians from Mumbai include Sanjeeva Uchil and Fortunato Franco. International players associated with the MFA include Mario Gracious, Bandya Kakade, Derek D'Souza, Ranjit Thapa, Amar Bahadur, Yusuf Ansari, Godfrey Pereira, Khalid Jamil, Henry Menezes, Akhil Ansari, Bernard Pereira, Arthur Pereira, Santosh Kashyap, Steven Dias and Abhishek Yadav.

== Main competitions ==
=== Club level ===
==== Men's senior ====
- Maharashtra State Senior Men's Football League
- Mumbai Premier League
- Mumbai Super League
- MFA First Division Championship
- MFA Second Division Championship
- MFA Third Division Championship
- MFA Futsal Championship

==== Men's youth ====
- U-18 Boys
- U-16 Boys Division I
- U-16 Boys Division II
- U-14 Boys Division I
- U-14 Boys Division II
- U-12 Boys
- U-10 Boys
- U-8 Boys

==== Women's senior ====
- Maharashtra State Senior Women's Football League
- MFA Women’s Premier League

==== Women's youth ====
- Girls U-17
- Girls U-14

== Knockout tournaments ==
=== Men's ===
Event	Teams
Republic Cup	Invitation - Maharashtra State Senior Men's Football League, Mumbai Super League, First Division Championship, Second Division Championship
Independence Day Cup	Maharashtra State Senior Men's Football League, Mumbai Premier League
Nadkarni Cup	Maharashtra State Senior Men's Football League, Mumbai Premier League, 3 from Mumbai Super League

== Football grounds ==
MFA conducts most of their events on the following grounds.

Ground	Location	Image
Cooperage Ground	Colaba	
Mumbai Football Arena	Andheri	
Goan Football Ground	Marine Lines	
St Xaviers Ground	Parel	
Neville D’Souza Turf	Bandra	
MSSA Ground	Azad Maidan	
Karntak Sporting Ground	Marine Lines	
