= Kenkre FC =

Indian association football club based in Mumbai

Kenkre
- Full name: Kenkre Football Club
- Nickname: Mumbaikars
- Founded: 13 January 2000; 26 years ago
- Ground: Cooperage Ground
- Capacity: 5,000
- Owner: Adib Krishna Sinai Kenkre
- Head coach: Abdul Siddique
- League: Mumbai Premier League
- Website: kenkresports.com
Home colours	Away colours	Third colours

Kenkre Football Club is an Indian professional football club based in the city of Mumbai, Maharashtra. Founded in 2000, the club currently competes in the MFA Elite Division of Mumbai Football League. Nicknamed "Mumbaikars", they previously participated in the I-League, then highest division of the Indian football league system, as well as the I-League 2, and the I-League 3. Kenkre was relegated to the I-League 2 at the end of the 2022–23 I-League season.

== History ==
=== Formation and journey ===
The club was founded on 13 January 2000 as Kenkre Academy FC, under the patronage of former footballer and coach Adib Kenkre, and CEO Joshua Lewis. Kenkre was based at Shivaji Park during its incorporation.

When we first started this club, the players themselves contributed Rs. 100 each. With that, we were able to buy our half-time refreshments, and we paid for a train pass for those who couldn't afford it. While it feels surreal to think that we're actually going to play in the I-League, it's something we've worked extremely hard for. This academy [Kenkre FC academy] and club are all his doing. He [Adib Kenkre] could've easily given up and shut shop like the many clubs in Mumbai, but his perseverance is tremendous. This club is going to be in the top divisions of India football for a long time, now that it has finally entered the door.

— Joshua Lewis (CEO of Kenkre), on club's early days and journey towards I-League.

Kenkre FC were crowned champions of the Maharashtra Football League in 2010 for the first time in the club's history, after defeating Bengal Mumbai 3–0, thanks to goals from Nigerian striker Mathew Odje, Francisco Salin and Charanjeet Singh. After achieving that result, Kenkre was granted admission into the I-League 2nd Division, then second-tier of Indian football.

In March 2013, ahead of the I-League Second Division kick-off, Kenkre roped in Portuguese Jose Luis Lopes Da Costa as head coach and brought three of their first foreigners, Portuguese Rodilson Felisberto Fernandes Dias, Domingo De Jesus Gomes, Bruno Daniel Alciaes, and Australian Daniel Atkins.

=== 2020–present ===
In December 2021, the AIFF club licensing committee has unanimously decided to not grant the exemption sought by former I-League champion Chennai City FC, after having failed to receive the ICLS licence. As a result, Kenkre replaced them in the 2021–22 I-League. In June 2021, Akhil Kothari, India's youngest AFC A license holder, as new head coach of Kenkre. The club began their league journey on 4 March 2022 against Real Kashmir with earning a historic point in the 1–1 draw. Kenkre finished bottom after the phrase 1 and was placed in relegation stage. They achieved 12 points and got relegated to the 2022–23 I-League 2nd Division.

After being relegated at the end of the season, Kenkre was reinstated on sympathetic grounds and allowed to participate in the 2022–23 I-League season. The club later participated in Baji Raut Cup in Odisha, in which they reached semi-finals. After struggling since beginning of the 2022–23 league season, Kenkre along with Sudeva Delhi, relegated from I-League. The 2023–24 I-League 2 season became disastrous to Kenkre as the club ended their campaign with bottom place finish with 9 points in 14 matches, and relegated to I-League 3. In 2024–25 season, the club along with its fellow Mumbai-based team Maharashtra Oranje, took part in I-League 3.

== Kit manufacturers and shirt sponsors ==
Period	Kit manufacturer	Shirt sponsor
2021–2023	Hummel	Kenkre Sports Foundation
2024–present	KING	Kenkre Sports Foundation

== Stadium ==
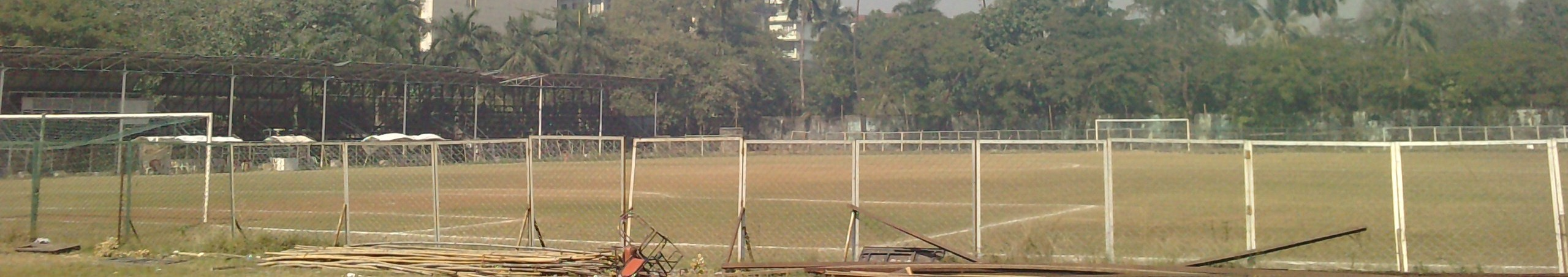
Cooperage Football Ground before renovation

Cooperage Ground in Nariman Point, Mumbai, serves as the home ground of Kenkre. It has artificial turf and has a seating capacity of 5,000. The club qualified for the I-League in 2021, but due to COVID-19 pandemic in India, league format was shortened and matches were played in few centralised venues. As the league came back with home-away format, Kenkre played its first home match at the Cooperage Ground against Churchill Brothers on 24 November 2022.

In later years, the club used Neville D'Souza Turf in Bandra for Mumbai Premier League matches. Ahead of the 2023–24 I-League 2, the club announced AIFF Centre of Excellence ground in Kharghar as their home venue.

== Personnel ==
=== Current technical staff ===
As of October 2024

Role	Name
Head coach	(India) Abdul Siddique
Assistant coach	(India) Deepak Dattu Kamble
Team manager	(India) Vishal Patel
Team doctor	(India) Prasad Risaldar
Team analyst	(India) Nilesh Pal

=== Management ===
As of December 2022

President	(India) Adib Krishna Sinai Kenkre
Chief Executive Officer	(India) Joshua K.Lewis
Team photographer	(India) Pravin Saru
Operations & accreditions	(India) Christopher Shriodkar
Logistics	(India) Shouvik Das

== Statistics and records ==
Season	League									
Season	League	Level	P	W	D	L	GF	GA	Points	Position
2011	I-League 2	II	6	3	1	2	14	11	10	Group Stage
2012	I-League 2	II	7	2	1	4	2	16	7	Group Stage
2013	I-League 2	II	8	3	3	2	12	10	12	Group Stage
2014	I-League 2	II	4	0	0	4	1	12	0	Group Stage
2015	I-League 2	II	14	3	1	10	21	39	10	7th
2015–16	I-League 2	II	8	1	3	4	6	11	6	Group Stage
2016–17	I-League 2	II	16	4	5	7	18	24	17	6th
2021	I-League 2	II	7	3	3	1	6	4	12	2nd ▲
2021–22	I-League	I	17	3	3	11	11	25	12	13th
2022–23	I-League	II	22	3	8	11	23	40	17	11th ▼
2021–22	I-League 2	III	14	3	0	11	17	34	9	8th ▼

== Honours ==
=== League ===
- I-League 2nd Division
  - Runners-up (1): 2021
- MFA Elite Division
  - Champions (1): 2010
  - Runners-up (1): 2019–20

=== Cup ===
- Nadkarni Cup
  - Runners-up (1): 2009

=== Women ===
- WIFA Women's Football League
  - Champions (1): 2019–20
- Mumbai Women's Football League
  - Champions (1): 2023–24

== Notable players ==
=== Past and present internationals ===
- The players below had senior/youth international cap(s) for their respective countries. Players with listed names represented their countries before or after playing for Kenkre FC.
- (Nigeria) Orok Essien (2011–2012)
- (Malawi) Young Chimodzi Jr. (2014–2015)
- (Guinea) Boubacar Keita (2011–2013)
- (Tibet) Tenzin Samdup (2021–2023)
- (Nepal) Anjan Bista (2023)

== Managerial history ==
- (Portugal) Jose Luis Lopes Da Costa (2014–2016)
- (India) Akhil Kothari (2021–2023)
- (India) Abdul Siddique (2023–2024)
- (India) Sushant Shripath Pawar (2024–present)

== Other departments ==
=== Women's section ===
Kenkre has its women's team which played in the Indian Women's League, the top flight of Women's football league system organised by the All India Football Federation. They also participate in WIFA Women's Football League. The club clinched WIFA Women's Football League title in 2019–20. Kenkre is also a one time champion in the MFA Women's Football League, title being clinched in the 2023–24 season.

=== Youth and academy ===
Since the inception of Kenkre, the club kept focus on nurturing youth talents and running academies. The club runs eight academies with more than a thousand kids enrolled before the COVID-19 pandemic in India. Club's U17 team, which was managed by both Floyd Pinto and Akhil Kothari, previously participated in the MSSA (Mumbai Schools Sports Association) tournaments. The club also took an initiative of grassroots development, organizing 'Go Green Cup' (with six categories including U-17, U-14, U-12, U-10, U-8 and open-age group of girls) in 2015, at the Don Bosco Grounds in Matunga. They also organized 'Kenkre Champions League', another academy-based tournament, in Mumbai.

Club's U-19 team participated in Maharashtra zone of 2014 I-League U19. The U17 team later took part in group stages of 2022–23 U-17 Youth Cup. The U19 team also participates in MDFA Super Division League. Club's U17 team has also competed in MFA Third Division league.

== See also ==
- List of football clubs in Mumbai
- Sports in Maharashtra

== Footnotes ==
1. Represented Tibet national football team in CONIFA tournaments internationally.
