= Union Bank of India =

Indian public sector bank

Union Bank of India (UBI)
- Type: Public
- Traded as: BSE: 532477; NSE: UNIONBANK
- ISIN: INE692A01016
- Industry: Banking; Financial services
- Founded: 11 November 1919; 106 years ago
- Headquarters: Union Bank Bhavan, 239, Vidhan Bhavan Marg, Nariman Point, Mumbai, Maharashtra, India
- Number of locations: 8,621 branches 8,910 ATMs (March 2025)
- Key people: Srinivasan Varadarajan (Non-Exe Chairman); Ashish Pandey (Managing Director & CEO)
- Services: Consumer banking, Corporate banking, Financial services, Investment banking, Mortgage loans, Private banking, Wealth management
- Revenue: ▲₹97,078 crore (US$10 billion) (FY23)
- Operating income: ▲₹25,250 crore (US$2.6 billion) (FY23)
- Net income: ▲₹8,511 crore (US$880 million) (FY23)
- Total assets: ▲₹1,490,323 crore (US$150 billion) (FY25)
- Total equity: ▲₹78,803 crore (US$8.2 billion) (FY23)
- Owner: Government of India (74.76%)
- Number of employees: 73,945
- Capital ratio: 18.02% (March 2025)
- Website: www.unionbankofindia.bank.in; www.unionbankonline.bank.in

Union Bank of India (UBI) is an Indian public sector bank headquartered in Mumbai. Established in 1919, the bank was nationalised by the Government of India in 1969. The bank is publicly listed, with the government owning about 74.76% of its total stake.

After the merger with Corporation Bank and Andhra Bank, which came into effect on 1 April 2020, UBI became the fifth largest Indian public sector bank. The bank has more than 8,650 domestic branches, 8,700 ATMs and 28,550 BC points.

== History ==
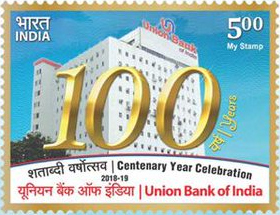
A 2018 stamp dedicated to the 100th anniversary of the Union Bank of India

Union Bank of India was established on 11 November 1919 in Bombay (now Mumbai) by Seth Sitaram Poddar. The bank shifted their registered corporate office to Samachar Marg, Fort, Mumbai in 1921. This office was inaugurated by Mahatma Gandhi.

During India's independence in 1947, the bank had four branches – three in Mumbai and one in Saurashtra in trade centres. At the time of its nationalisation in 1969, it had 240 branches. Post nationalisation, the bank sponsored four regional banks.

In 1975, it acquired Belgaum Bank, a private sector bank established in 1930 that had itself merged in a bank in 1964, the Shri Jadeya Shankarling Bank (Bijapur; incorporated on 10 May 1948). In 1985, it acquired Miraj State Bank, which had been established in 1929, and which had 26 branches. In 1999, UBI acquired Sikkim Bank with its eight branches.

In 2002, the bank undertook a public offer of equity shares, listing on NSE and BSE.

The global expansion of UBI began with the opening of representative offices in Doha and Qatar in 2004. UBI expanded internationally in 2007 with the opening of offices in Abu Dhabi, United Arab Emirates and in Shanghai, China. In 2008, it established a branch in Hong Kong. In 2009, Union Bank opened a representative office in Sydney, Australia.

In March 2011, the subsidiary of the bank, Union KBC Mutual Fund, received SEBI approval to act as the asset management company. In 2016, UBI completed the acquisition of 49% shareholding of Union KBC Asset Management Company Private Limited and Union KBC Trustee Company Private Limited from KBC participants and its affiliates. As a result of this, they became subsidiaries of the bank.

On 30 August 2019, Finance Minister Nirmala Sitharaman announced that Andhra Bank and Corporation Bank would be merged into Union Bank of India. The proposed merger would make Union Bank the fifth largest public sector bank in the country with assets of ₹14.59 lakh crore (US$150 billion) and 9,609 branches. After the requisite approvals, the merger was completed on 1 April 2020. After the merger, the bank had 9,500 branches and over 13,300 ATMs. As of March 2020, the government shareholding stood at 86.75%.

== Operations ==
As of 2026, the bank had a network of 8,697 branches and 2 overseas branches, 8,656 ATMs across 29 states and 5 union territories.

=== Employees ===
UBI has approximately 57,960 employees as of March 2026.

== Subsidiaries ==
- Union Bank of India (UK) Limited
- Union Asset Management Co. Private Limited
- Union Trustee Co. Pvt. Limited
- Star Union Dai-ichi Life Insurance
- Andhra Pradesh Grameena Bank
- Corpbank Securities ltd.
- UBI Services Ltd

== See also ==
- Banking in India
- List of banks in India
- Reserve Bank of India
- Indian Financial System Code
