= Cooperage Ground =

Sports venue in Mumbai, India

Coordinates: 18°55′28″N 72°49′43″E

Cooperage Football Ground
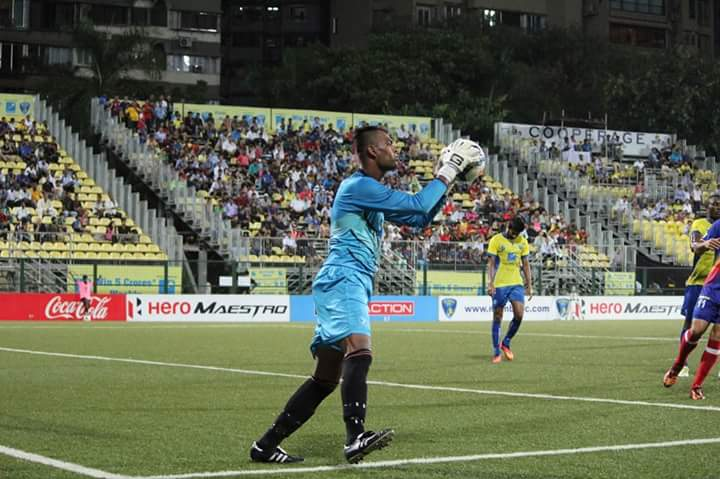
- Cooperage Football Ground on a matchday of the I-League in 2015
- Interactive map of Cooperage Football Ground
- Location: Mumbai, India
- Owner: Brihanmumbai Municipal Corporation
- Capacity: 5,000
- Surface: Artificial grass
- Field size: 105×68 metres

Construction
- Opened: 1904
- Renovated: 2017

Tenants
- Mumbai Football League; MFA Elite Corporate League; Mumbay FC; Maharashtra Oranje FC; Mumbai Knights FC; WIFA Women's Football League; Mumbai Women's Premier League

The Cooperage Football Ground is a football stadium located in Nariman Point, Mumbai, Maharashtra. It is predominantly home to multiple Mumbai Football League clubs.

The Western India Football Association has operated from the Cooperage Ground since 1969, and the Mumbai District Football Association holds a small office. It was a venue for one of India's premier national leagues, the I-League. Mahindra United FC, Kenkre FC, and Mumbai FC used the stadium as home ground in both the NFL and the I-League, while Ambernath United Atlanta FC hosted its I-League 2nd Division games.

== History ==
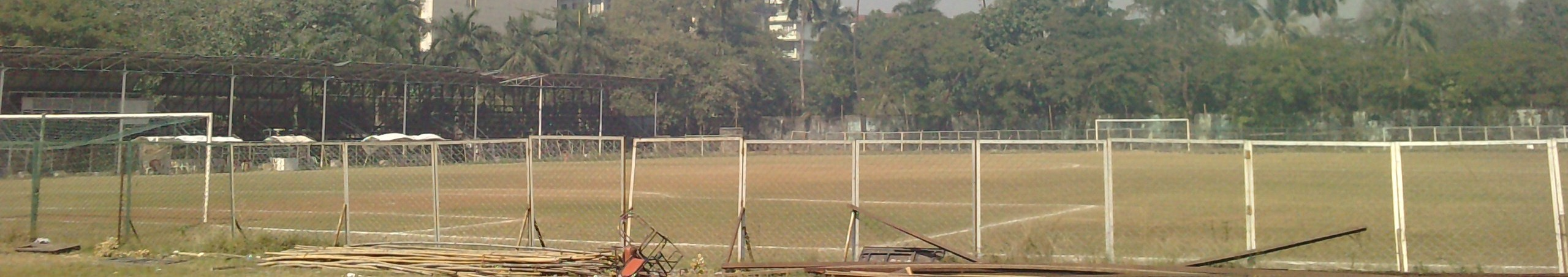
Cooperage Ground before renovation

Cooperage Ground was the primary venue for Rovers Cup, the third oldest football tournament in India after Durand and Trades Cup. The stadium was occupied by the British Indian Army during the World War I. In April 2011, plans were announced for the Cooperage Football Ground to be renovated when FIFA announced that they would give the Western India Football Association US$2 million in order to renovate that stadium. On 12 June 2011, it was announced in the Bombay High Court that the West India Football Association would be given the right to renovate the Cooperage Ground.

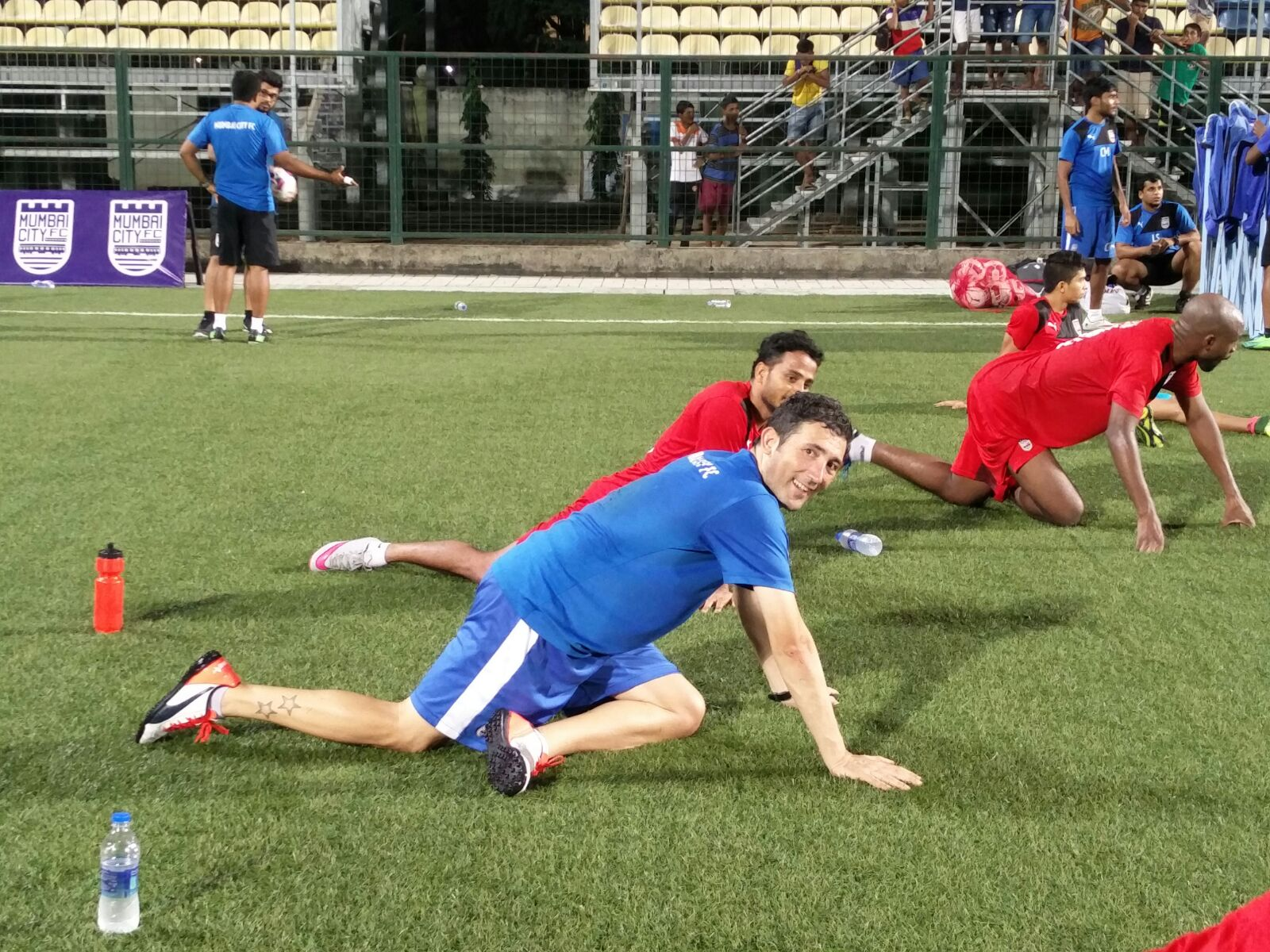
Mumbai City FC players practice at the stadium in December 2015

== See also ==
- List of football stadiums in India
- Mumbai Football Arena
