= 2025–26 Mumbai Premier League =

113th season of the Mumbai Football League

Mumbai Premier League
- Season: 2025–26
- Dates: 1 December 2025 – 22 May 2026
- Champions: Maharashtra Oranje
- Promoted: Maharashtra Oranje
- Matches: 102
- Goals: 400 (3.92 per match)
- Highest scoring: Bombay Gymkhana 10–0 Sellebrity; Millat 10–0 Mumbai Kenkre

The 2025–26 Mumbai Premier League is the 113th season of the regional football league run by the Mumbai Football Association in Mumbai. It represents the seventh tier of the Indian football league system after formation of the Maharashtra State Senior Men's Football League. India On Track are the defending champions.

== Venue ==
Matches are played at Neville D'Souza Football Turf in Bandra.

== Teams ==
20 teams are participating in the 2025–26 edition of the Mumbai Premier League.

2025–26 Mumbai Premier League teams

Teams	Location
Mumbai Soccer Prodigies	Bandra
MYJ–GMSC	Orlem
PIFA	Colaba
Maharashtra Oranje	Powai
Community Football Club India	Vile Parle
Hope United	Churchgate
Sellebrity	Bandra
Mumbai Kenkre	Mahim
Millat	Andheri
DK Flag Foundation	Badlapur
Reliance FYC	Navi Mumbai
Mumbay	Churchgate
India Culture League	Vashi
Kalina Rangers CFF	Kalina
Mumbai City B	Andheri
Iron Born	Andheri
India On Track FC	Andheri
Bombay Gymkhana	Fort
Waves FC	Madh Island
Mumbai Ultras	Saki Naka

=== Promoted/relegated teams ===
Mumbai Soccer Prodigies, Waves FC, and Mumbai Ultras gained promotion from the 2024–25 Mumbai Super League after finishing 1st, 2nd and 3rd, respectively. Bombay Muslims were relegated after the 2024–25 Mumbai Premier League for unknown reasons even though a relegation round was not conducted.

▲ from 2024-25 Super League	▼ to 2025-26 Super League
Mumbai Soccer Prodigies; Waves FC; Mumbai Ultras	Bombay Muslims

== League table ==
=== Group A ===
Pos	Team	Pld	W	D	L	GF	GA	GD	Pts	Qualification
1	India On Track	9	7	1	1	24	12	+12	22	Playoffs
2	Maharashtra Oranje	9	6	1	2	25	9	+16	19	Playoffs
3	Hope United	9	6	1	2	20	7	+13	19	Playoffs
4	Reliance FYC	8	4	1	3	15	11	+4	13	Playoffs
5	Kalina Rangers	9	4	1	4	24	17	+7	13	
6	Bombay Gymkhana	9	4	1	4	24	21	+3	13	
7	Mumbai City B	9	3	1	5	13	15	−2	10	
8	DK Flag Foundation	8	3	1	4	9	15	−6	10	
9	Waves	9	2	2	5	13	14	−1	8	
10	Sellebrity	9	0	0	9	6	52	−46	0	

Source: MFA official The Away End Football Counter
Rules for classification: 1) points; 2) goal difference; 3) number of goals scored

=== Fixtures ===
Home \ Away	IOT	OFC	HUF	KAL	REL	BGK	MCI	DKP	WAV	SEL
India On Track	—	2–1	2–1	0–4			2–1	3–1	2–1	5–1
Maharashtra Oranje		—		1–0	3–1	4–0		3–0		9–0
Hope United		3–0	—			2–1	1–0	4–0	1–2	4–0
Kalina Rangers			2–2	—		3–5	3–1		4–0	
Reliance FYC	1–1		0–2	5–1	—	0–2	3–0			3–1
Bombay Gymkhana	1–7					—				10–0
Mumbai City B		2–2				3–2	—	0–1	2–0	4–1
DK Flag				2–1		1–2		—	0–0	4–2
Waves		1–2			1–2	1–1			—	
Sellebrity				1–6					0–7	—

Source: The Away End Football Counter
Legend: Blue = home team win; Yellow = draw; Red = away team win.

==== Group B ====
Pos	Team	Pld	W	D	L	GF	GA	GD	Pts	Qualification
1	MYJ–GMSC	8	8	0	0	35	2	+33	24	Playoffs
2	Mumbai Ultras	9	6	1	2	25	11	+14	19	Playoffs
3	Mumbay FC	9	6	0	3	19	17	+2	18	Playoffs
4	ICL Mumbai	8	5	1	2	26	14	+12	16	Playoffs
5	Millat	8	5	0	3	21	8	+13	15	
6	PIFA	8	3	1	4	15	10	+5	10	
7	Mumbai Soccer Prodigies	9	3	1	5	13	17	−4	10	
8	Iron Born	9	3	0	6	14	22	−8	9	
9	CFCI	9	2	0	7	9	25	−16	6	
10	Mumbai Kenkre	9	0	0	9	5	56	−51	0	

Source: MFA official The Away End Football Counter
Rules for classification: 1) points; 2) goal difference; 3) number of goals scored

=== Fixtures ===
Home \ Away	MYJ	ULT	MFC	ICL	MIL	PIF	MSP	IBF	CFC	KEN
MYJ–GMSC	—							3–0	5–0	
Mumbai Ultras	0–4	—				2–0			5–0	
Mumbay	0–6	3–0	—			0–5		1–0		
ICL Mumbai	1–7	2–2	0–2	—						
Millat		0–1	2–4	1–2	—	2–0	1–0	3–0	2–1	10–0
PIFA	0–2					—		3–2		
Mumbai Prodigies	0–6	0–3	2–1	1–2		1–1	—	1–2		
Iron Born		2–3		0–4				—		6–3
CFCI			1–2	1–7		1–0	1–2	1–2	—	3–0
Mumbai Kenkre	1–2	0–9	1–6	0–8		0–6	0–6			—

Source: The Away End Football Counter
Legend: Blue = home team win; Yellow = draw; Red = away team win.

== Playoffs ==
=== Group A ===
Pos	Team	Pld	W	D	L	GF	GA	GD	Pts	Qualification
1	Maharashtra Oranje	3	2	1	0	6	3	+3	7	Semi-finals
2	ICL Mumbai	3	2	1	0	4	1	+3	7	Semi-finals
3	Mumbai Ultras	3	1	0	2	2	3	−1	3	
4	India On Track^{MSL}	3	0	0	3	1	6	−5	0	

Source: MFA official The Away End Football Counter
Rules for classification: 1) points; 2) goal difference; 3) number of goals scored

=== Fixtures ===
Home \ Away	OFC	ICL	ULT	IOT
Maharashtra Oranje	—		2–1	
ICL Mumbai	1–1	—	1–0	
Mumbai Ultras			—	1–0
India On Track	1–3	0–2		—

Source: The Away End Football Counter
Legend: Blue = home team win; Yellow = draw; Red = away team win.

=== Group B ===
Pos	Team	Pld	W	D	L	GF	GA	GD	Pts	Qualification
1	MYJ-GMSC^{IL2}	3	2	0	1	5	5	0	6	Semi-finals
2	Reliance FYC	3	2	0	1	9	8	+1	6	Semi-finals
3	Mumbay^{IL3/MSL}	3	1	0	2	6	5	+1	3	
4	Hope United^{MSL}	3	1	0	2	7	9	−2	3	

Source: MFA official The Away End Football Counter
Rules for classification: 1) points; 2) goal difference; 3) number of goals scored

=== Fixtures ===
Home \ Away	MUM	REL	MYJ	HOP
Mumbay	—	1–3		
Reliance FYC		—		5–4
MYJ-GMSC	2–1	3–1	—	
Hope United	0–4		3–0	—

Source: The Away End Football Counter
Legend: Blue = home team win; Yellow = draw; Red = away team win.

== Knockout stage ==
The semifinals and finals took place at Neville D'souza Football Ground, Bandra.

Semi-Finals
A1	Maharashtra Oranje	1
B2	Reliance FYC	0
B1	MYJ-GMSC	1
A2	ICL Mumbai	0

Finals
A1	Maharashtra Oranje	2
B1	MYJ-GMSC	1

== See also ==
- 2025–26 I-League 3 (Tier IV)
- 2025–26 Indian State Leagues (Tier V)
- 2025–26 Maharashtra State Football League (Tier VI)
- 2025–26 Mumbai Super League (Tier VIII)
- 2025–26 in Indian football
