= 2025–26 Mumbai Super League =

Mumbai Super League

Mumbai Super League
- Season: 2025–26
- Dates: 20 August 2025 –

The 2025–26 Mumbai Super League represents the 3rd tier of the Maharashtra football league system and the 7th tier of the Indian football pyramid. It is part of the Mumbai Football League, run by the Mumbai Football Association. The top three teams at the end of the playoffs are promoted to the Mumbai Premier League.

Mumbai Soccer Prodigies were crowned champions after the 2024–25 season. Waves FC and Mumbai Ultras finished second and third and were promoted to the 2025–26 Mumbai Premier League.

The MFA Independence Cup opened the 2025-26 Mumbai Super League season. The final of the men's editions, played on 15 August, was won by KSA Juniors. Bombay Gymkhana won the inaugural women's edition.

== Teams and venue ==
47 teams are participating in the 2025–26 Mumbai Super League. Matches are played at the Neville D'Souza Ground in Bandra.

South Mumbai United changed their name to Mumbai Dynamos. Mumbai Athletico, who took over Maharashtra Oranje FC's academy team, renamed themselves Urban Force FC.

The following teams have changed division since the 2024–25 season:

=== Entered Mumbai Super League ===
Promoted from 2024–25 First Division

- Navanagar
- Mumbai Warriors
- Yawn FC
- Catholic Gymkhana

Relegated from the 2024–25 Mumbai Premier League

- Bombay Muslims

=== Left Mumbai Super League ===
Promoted to the 2025–26 Mumbai Premier League

- Mumbai Soccer Prodigies
- Waves FC
- Mumbai Ultras

Relegated to 2025–26 MFA First Division Championship

- None

== League tables ==
On 20 August, the opening day of the campaign, FSI thrashed Urban Force 9-0. In December, Offshots qualified for the next stage while Brothers WA, Navanagar, and Skorost battled it out for the last remaining position.

=== Group A ===
Pos	Team	Pld	W	D	L	GF	GA	GD	Pts	Qualification
1	Shastri Nagar Offshots	11	11	0	0	60	10	+50	33	Qualification for playoffs
2	Brothers Football Welfare	11	7	2	2	36	21	+15	23	
3	Skorost United	10	7	1	2	51	8	+43	22	Qualification for playoffs
4	Navanagar	10	6	1	3	31	19	+12	19	
5	Mumbai Warriors	9	5	0	4	20	29	−9	15	
6	Anstrengung United	11	4	2	5	28	26	+2	14	
7	Ratnam	11	3	2	6	24	42	−18	11	
8	Football School of India	10	3	1	6	25	28	−3	10	
9	United Villagers	11	3	1	7	25	35	−10	10	
10	Mumbai Marines	11	3	1	7	11	39	−28	10	
11	Urban Force	10	3	0	7	17	44	−27	9	
12	Salsette FC	11	2	1	8	15	42	−27	7	

Source: MSL Group A Standings Football Counter
Rules for classification: 1) points; 2) head-to-head points; 3) head-to-head goal difference; 4) head-to-head goals scored; 5) goal difference; 6) goals scored

=== Group B ===
In September, Somiya and Young Guns showed their title credentials by beating JMJ 5-0 and Regal SF 12-1, respectively. In December, Charkop, Young Guns and Somaiya battled it out for the top two spots.

Pos	Team	Pld	W	D	L	GF	GA	GD	Pts	Qualification
1	Somaiya	11	9	2	0	38	4	+34	29	Qualification for playoffs
2	Young Guns Bandra	11	9	1	1	38	4	+34	28	Qualification for playoffs
3	Charkop FC	11	9	0	2	45	10	+35	27	
4	Spartans	11	5	1	5	22	20	+2	16	
5	West Zone United	11	5	1	5	23	22	+1	16	
6	Mumbai Strikers	10	4	2	4	26	19	+7	14	
7	Rudra-JBU	10	3	2	5	13	18	−5	11	
8	ICL U19	11	3	2	6	14	23	−9	11	
9	Soccer XI	11	3	1	7	17	39	−22	10	
10	JMJ Sports	11	3	1	7	9	36	−27	10	
11	Symbians	11	3	0	8	9	37	−28	9	
12	India Rush	11	2	1	8	13	35	−22	7	

Source: MSL Group B Standings Football Counter
Rules for classification: 1) points; 2) head-to-head points; 3) head-to-head goal difference; 4) head-to-head goals scored; 5) goal difference; 6) goals scored

=== Group C ===
In September, Mumbai Dynamos came back from a goal down to beat Regal SF by 3-1.

Pos	Team	Pld	W	D	L	GF	GA	GD	Pts	Qualification
1	Kopana	11	9	1	1	32	7	+25	28	Qualification for playoffs
2	Young Guns India	10	9	0	1	41	6	+35	27	Qualification for playoffs
3	Oscar Foundation	10	7	0	3	30	14	+16	21	
4	Mumbai Dynamos	11	6	1	4	26	19	+7	19	
5	Yawn FC	10	5	0	5	16	25	−9	15	
6	Tarun Sporting	11	4	2	5	29	20	+9	14	
7	Don Bosco Academy	11	4	2	5	16	21	−5	14	
8	Bombay Muslims	11	4	0	7	15	28	−13	12	
9	Millat B	11	3	2	6	14	34	−20	11	
10	Young Boys	11	3	1	7	17	31	−14	10	
11	Regal Foundation	10	3	0	7	12	33	−21	9	
12	Soccer Saga	11	2	1	8	15	25	−10	7	

Source: MSL Group C Standings Football Counter
Rules for classification: 1) points; 2) head-to-head points; 3) head-to-head goal difference; 4) head-to-head goals scored; 5) goal difference; 6) goals scored

=== Group D ===
Pos	Team	Pld	W	D	L	GF	GA	GD	Pts	Qualification
1	CFCI B	9	8	1	0	46	10	+36	25	Qualification for playoffs
2	KSA Juniors	9	6	0	3	29	26	+3	18	
3	Bombay Gymkhana Colts	9	5	2	2	23	8	+15	17	Qualification for playoffs
4	ROQS	9	5	2	2	21	10	+11	17	
5	United City	9	5	2	2	16	9	+7	17	
6	Iron Born B	9	4	1	4	22	13	+9	13	
7	Kenkre U19	9	2	3	4	15	19	−4	9	
8	Bombay YMCA	9	2	0	7	14	39	−25	6	
9	Colaba FC	9	1	1	7	13	40	−27	4	
10	ICL Youngstars	9	1	0	8	11	36	−25	3	
11	Catholic Gymkhana	0	0	0	0	0	0	0	0	

Source: MSL Group D Standings Football Counter
Rules for classification: 1) points; 2) head-to-head points; 3) head-to-head goal difference; 4) head-to-head goals scored; 5) goal difference; 6) goals scored

== Playoffs ==
=== Group A ===
Pos	Team	Pld	W	D	L	GF	GA	GD	Pts	Qualification
1	Somaiya	3	3	0	0	11	1	+10	9	Final round
2	CFCI B	3	2	0	1	10	2	+8	6	Final round
3	Bombay Gymkhana Colts	3	0	1	2	1	7	−6	1	
4	Kopana	3	0	1	2	1	13	−12	1	

Updated to match(es) played on 2 February 2026. Source: Football Counter
Rules for classification: 1) points; 2) head-to-head points 3) head-to-head goal difference; 4) head-to-head goals scored 5) goal difference 6) goals scored

=== Group B ===
Pos	Team	Pld	W	D	L	GF	GA	GD	Pts	Qualification
1	Offshots	3	2	1	0	9	3	+6	7	Final round
2	YG Bandra	3	2	0	1	8	4	+4	6	Final round
3	YG India	3	1	1	1	1	3	−2	4	
4	Skorost	3	0	0	3	0	8	−8	0	

Updated to match(es) played on 2 February 2026. Source: Football Counter
Rules for classification: 1) points; 2) head-to-head points 3) head-to-head goal difference; 4) head-to-head goals scored 5) goal difference 6) goals scored

== See also ==
- 2025–26 Mumbai Premier League
- 2025–26 I-League 3
- 2025–26 Indian State Leagues
- 2025–26 in Indian football
