= 2026 Maharashtra State Senior Men's Football League =

2nd season of the Maharashtra State Senior Men's Football League

Maharashtra State Senior Men's Football League
- Season: 2025–26
- Dates: 7 March – 20 April 2026
- Champions: Game of Goals
- Promoted: Game of Goals
- Matches: 60
- Goals: 235 (3.92 per match)
- Highest scoring: IOT 11-0 Mumbay

The 2026 Maharashtra State Senior Men's Football League (MSSMFL) is the second season of the top-tier state-level football league in the Indian state of Maharashtra, representing the fifth tier of the Indian football league system.

Magic Made Soccer from Solapur were the defending champions.

== Venues ==
All matches are played at the Sinhgad Sports Complex in Lonavala.

== Format ==
The league will follow a double round-robin format with 81 matches, offering a platform for football clubs from Maharashtra to enter I-League 3.

== Clubs ==
Location of MSSMFL teams

| Clubs | City | Qualification |
|---|---|---|
| India On Track | Mumbai | MPL 1st |
| Hope United | Mumbai | MPL 3rd |
| Mumbay | Mumbai | MPL 4th |
| Game Of Goals | Pune | PDFA League |
| AIYFA Skyhawks | Pune | PDFA League |
| Snigmay Pune | Pune | PDFA League |
| Firodia Shivajians | Ahmednagar | TBC |
| Kalyan East | Thane | Thane Football League |
| Magic Made Soccer | Solapur | KSA Winner |
| Nashik United Sports Academy | Nashik | TBC |

== League table ==
| Pos | Team | Pld | W | D | L | GF | GA | GD | Pts | Qualification |
|---|---|---|---|---|---|---|---|---|---|---|
| 1 | Game Of Goals | 14 | 11 | 2 | 1 | 39 | 10 | +29 | 35 | Champions and 2026–27 I-League 3 |
| 2 | India On Track | 14 | 10 | 3 | 1 | 50 | 10 | +40 | 33 | |
| 3 | Hope United | 14 | 8 | 3 | 3 | 41 | 9 | +32 | 27 | |
| 4 | Snigmay Pune | 14 | 6 | 2 | 6 | 27 | 24 | +3 | 20 | |
| 5 | AIYFA Skyhawks | 14 | 5 | 4 | 5 | 19 | 23 | −4 | 19 | |
| 6 | Kalyan East | 14 | 5 | 1 | 8 | 23 | 25 | −2 | 16 | |
| 7 | Nashik United | 9 | 3 | 1 | 5 | 20 | 19 | +1 | 10 | |
| 8 | Firodia Shivajians | 9 | 2 | 2 | 5 | 10 | 28 | −18 | 8 | |
| 9 | Mumbay FC^{IL3} | 9 | 1 | 0 | 8 | 4 | 49 | −45 | 3 | |
| 10 | Magic Made Soccer | 9 | 0 | 0 | 9 | 2 | 38 | −36 | 0 | |

Source: The Away End Instagram Football Counter WIFA
Rules for classification: 1) points; 2) goal difference; 3) number of goals scored

=== Fixtures ===
| 1st leg / 2nd leg | GOG | IOT | HOP | SNI | SKY | KAL | NAS | FIR | MUM | MMS |
|---|---|---|---|---|---|---|---|---|---|---|
| Game Of Goals | — | 1–0 | 1–0 | 0–3 | 3–0 | 4–0 | 3–1 | 2–2 | | 5–0 |
| India On Track | 0–0 | — | 2–1 | 6–2 | 4–1 | 2–0 | | | 11–0 | 6–0 |
| Hope United | 1–2 | 1–1 | — | 0–0 | 2–2 | 1–0 | | 5–0 | | 9–0 |
| Snigmay Pune | 2–3 | 0–1 | 0–1 | — | 0–1 | 1–0 | 4–3 | | 6–1 | |
| AIYFA Skyhawks | 0–3 | 3–3 | 1–4 | 1–1 | — | 0–2 | | 1–0 | | 2–0 |
| Kalyan East | 1–5 | 1–4 | 0–4 | 6–1 | 0–1 | — | | | 4–0 | |
| Nashik United | | 0–3 | 0–3 | | 1–1 | 1–2 | — | | 3–0 | |
| Firodia Shivajians | | 0–7 | | 0–5 | | 1–1 | 2–5 | — | 4–2 | |
| Mumbay | 0–7 | | 0–9 | | 0–5 | | | 0–1 | — | 1–0 |
| Magic Made Soccer | | | | 1–2 | | 0–6 | 1–6 | | | — |

Source: The Away End Instagram Football Counter WIFA
Legend: Blue = left column team win; Yellow = draw; Red = top row team win.

== See also ==
- 2025–26 Mumbai Premier League
- 2025–26 Mumbai Super League
- 2025–26 in Indian football
- 2025–26 I-League 3
- 2025–26 Indian State Leagues
