= 2024–25 Mumbai Premier League =

112th season of the Mumbai Football League

Mumbai Premier League
- Season: 2024–25
- Dates: 13 October 2024 – 13 April 2025
- Champions: India On Track
- Promoted: India On Track
- Relegated: Bombay Muslims
- Matches: 117
- Goals: 418 (3.57 per match)
- Top goalscorer: Zeeshan Akhtar (22 goals) (ICL Mumbai)
- Best goalkeeper: Prathamesh Honavarkar (India On Track)
- Highest scoring: India Culture League 13–0 Kalina Rangers (9 April 2025)
- All statistics correct as of 15 April 2025.

The 2024–25 Mumbai Premier League was the 112th season of the regional football league run by the Mumbai Football Association in Mumbai. It represents the sixth tier of the Indian football league system after formation of the Maharashtra State Senior Men's Football League. MYJ–GMSC were the defending champions.

== Cup tournaments ==
=== Harwood League ===
The season kicked off with the Harwood League, Mumbai's oldest football tournament first played in 1902, now a pre-season tournament featuring teams from the Premier League and the Corporate League. The tournament was won by the Indian Culture League Mumbai.

=== Nadkarni Cup ===
MYJ-GMSC won the 116-year-old Nadkarni Cup, one of the oldest domestic tournaments in Asia. They beat Mumbai City Reserves in the final by the score of 1–0.

== Venue ==
Matches were played at Neville D'Souza Football Turf in Bandra.

== Teams ==
18 teams are participating in the 2024–25 edition of the Mumbai Premier League.

2024–25 Mumbai Premier League teams

Teams	Location
Bombay Muslims	Mumbai Central
MYJ–GMSC	IC Colony
PIFA	Colaba
Maharashtra Oranje	Powai
Community Football Club India	Vile Parle
Hope United	Churchgate
Sellebrity	Bandra
Mumbai Kenkre	Mahim
Millat FC	Andheri
DK Flag Foundation	Badlapur
Reliance FYC	Navi Mumbai
Mumbay FC	Churchgate
India Culture League	Vashi
Kalina Rangers CFF	Kalina
Mumbai City B	Andheri
Iron Born	Andheri
India On Track FC	Andheri
Bombay Gymkhana	Fort

=== Promoted/relegated teams ===
Mumbai City B and India On Track gained promotion from the 2023–24 Mumbai Super League while JMJ Sports were relegated after withdrawing from the 2023-24 Mumbai Premier League halfway through the season. Bombay Gymkhana returns after finishing third in the 2023–24 Mumbai Super League.

Mumbay FC launched on 18 July 2024 sporting colours and a crest suspiciously similar to the defunct Mumbai FC, replaced Protrack from the previous season. Tiger Shroff was roped in as an unofficial marquee player to promote the new club.

▲ from 2023-24 Super League	▼ to 2024-25 Super League
Mumbai City B India On Track; Bombay Gymkhana; Mumbay FC	JMJ Sports

== Format ==
The teams are divided into two groups. The top five teams from each group advance to the Championship playoff round. The bottom four teams from each group enter the Relegation playoff round. Both playoff rounds follow a straight league format. The bottom four teams in the relegation round will be demoted to the 2025-26 Mumbai Super League.

== League table ==
=== Group A ===
Pos	Team	Pld	W	D	L	GF	GA	GD	Pts	Qualification
1	MYJ–GMSC	8	7	0	1	28	9	+19	21	Championship Round
2	CFCI	8	6	0	2	16	7	+9	18	Championship Round
3	Kalina Rangers	8	5	1	2	20	12	+8	16	Championship Round
4	Mumbai City B	8	5	0	3	15	9	+6	15	Championship Round
5	Mumbai Kenkre	8	4	1	3	12	12	0	13	Championship Round
6	Reliance FYC	8	3	3	2	11	7	+4	12	
7	DK Flag Foundation	8	2	1	5	13	18	−5	7	
8	PIFA	8	1	0	7	7	21	−14	3	
9	Bombay Muslims	8	0	0	8	1	28	−27	0	Relegation to 2025–26 Mumbai Super League

Source: MFA official The Away End Football Counter
Rules for classification: 1) points; 2) goal difference; 3) number of goals scored

=== Fixtures ===
Home \ Away	MYJ	CFC	KAL	MCI	KEN	REL	DKP	PIF	BMS
MYJ–GMSC	—						4–2	4–1	
CFCI	1–3	—	3–2			3–0	2–0	3–1	
Kalina Rangers	3–2		—	0–3		0–0		4–0	
Mumbai City B	1–4	0–2		—			2–0	4–0	2–1
Mumbai Kenkre	1–3	1–0	1–3	1–3	—	1–1			
Reliance FYC	0–1			1–0		—		3–1	
DK Flag Foundation			3–5		2–3	1–1	—	2–1	3–0
PIFA					0–1			—	
Bombay Muslims	0–7	0–2	0–3		0–3	0–5		0–3	—

Source: Football Counter
Legend: Blue = home team win; Yellow = draw; Red = away team win.

==== Group B ====
Pos	Team	Pld	W	D	L	GF	GA	GD	Pts	Qualification
1	India On Track	8	7	1	0	26	3	+23	22	Championship Round
2	Mumbay FC	8	6	0	2	11	8	+3	18	Championship Round
3	Maharashtra Oranje	8	5	1	2	28	4	+24	16	Championship Round
4	Hope United	8	5	1	2	22	6	+16	16	Championship Round
5	ICL Mumbai	8	4	1	3	23	10	+13	13	Championship Round
6	Millat	8	4	0	4	14	11	+3	12	
7	Iron Born	8	1	1	6	10	26	−16	4	
8	Bombay Gymkhana	8	1	1	6	9	33	−24	4	
9	Sellebrity	8	0	0	8	4	46	−42	0	

Source: MFA official The Away End Football Counter
Rules for classification: 1) points; 2) goal difference; 3) number of goals scored

=== Fixtures ===
Home \ Away	IOT	MFC	OFC	HUF	ICL	MIL	IBF	BGK	SEL
India On Track	—	4–0	1–1		3–1	3–1	3–0	7–0	4–0
Mumbay FC		—	1–0				2–1		
Maharashtra Oranje			—				7–0		
Hope United	0–1	2–3	1–0	—			4–0		
ICL Mumbai		0–2	0–1	1–1	—	2–1	3–0		9–0
Millat		1–0	1–2	0–1		—	3–1	3–1	4–1
Iron Born							—		5–1
Bombay Gymkhana		0–1	0–6	0–5	2–7		3–3	—	3–1
Sellebrity		0–2	0–11	1–8					—

Source: Football Counter
Legend: Blue = home team win; Yellow = draw; Red = away team win.

== Playoffs ==
The top five Group B teams were the first to confirm their places in the championship round. The championship playoff games began on 11 February 2025.

=== Championship Round ===
Previously, the champions of Mumbai were eligible for I-League 3. However, this season, the champions of the inaugural 2024–25 Maharashtra State Senior Men's Football League were considered as it replaced the Mumbai Premier League as Maharashtra's top-tier league.

Pos	Team	Pld	W	D	L	GF	GA	GD	Pts	Qualification
1	India On Track (C, P)	9	5	3	1	17	6	+11	18	Champions and 2026 MSSMFL
2	MYJ–GMSC^{IL2}	9	5	2	2	18	7	+11	17	
3	Hope United	9	4	4	1	19	10	+9	16	2026 MSSMFL
4	Mumbay FC	9	4	3	2	19	13	+6	15	2026 MSSMFL
5	Maharashtra Oranje	9	3	5	1	15	13	+2	14	
6	ICL Mumbai	9	3	1	5	21	17	+4	10	
7	Mumbai City B^{ISL}	9	2	4	3	13	19	−6	10	
8	Mumbai Kenkre	9	2	3	4	16	16	0	9	
9	Kalina Rangers	9	2	2	5	10	32	−22	8	
10	CFCI	9	1	1	7	9	24	−15	4	

Source: MFA official The Away End Football Counter
Rules for classification: 1) points; 2) goal difference; 3) number of goals scored
(C) Champions; (P) Promoted

=== Fixtures ===
Home \ Away	IOT	MYJ	HUF	MFC	OFC	ICL	MCI	KEN	KAL	CFC
India On Track	—	1–0			2–2	4–0		3–1		1–0
MYJ–GMSC		—				3–0		0–0	7–0	
Hope United	1–1	1–1	—						1–0	8–0
Mumbay FC	2–1	4–0	2–3	—	1–1					
Maharashtra Oranje		0–3	1–1		—	2–1	2–2			
ICL Mumbai			1–2	0–2		—	2–2	2–1	13–0	
Mumbai City B	0–4	1–2	1–1	3–2			—	0–3		2–2
Mumbai Kenkre			3–1	1–1	2–2			—	2–3	
Kalina Rangers	0–0			3–3	1–3		1–2		—	2–1
CFCI		0–2		1–2	0–2	1–2		4–3		—

Source: MFA official The Away End Football Counter
Legend: Blue = home team win; Yellow = draw; Red = away team win.

== Top scorers ==
Rank	Player	Team	Goals
1	Zeeshan Akhtar	ICL Mumbai	22
2	VS Thotkadhar Zimik	Mumbai Kenkre	16
3	Mohammed Khatib	Maharashtra Oranje	14
3	Mohammed Arfat Ansari	India On Track	14
5	Sunny Vishnu Thakur	Hope United	13

== Individual awards ==
- Best goalkeeper: Prathamesh Honavarkar (India On Track)
- Best defender: Nishant Shetty (India On Track)
- Best midfielder: Kamran Ansari (MYJ-GMSC)
- Best striker: Zeeshan Akhtar (ICL Mumbai)

== See also ==
- 2024–25 Maharashtra State Senior Men's Football League
- 2024–25 Mumbai Super League
- 2024–25 in Indian football
- 2024–25 I-League 3
- 2024–25 Indian State Leagues
