= 2025–26 in Indian football =

Competitive association football season

Football in India
- Season: 2025–26

Men's football
- ISL: East Bengal
- IFL: Diamond Harbour
- I-League 2: Delhi
- I-League 3: Banaras Baghpat
- Super Cup: Goa
- Durand Cup: NorthEast United

Women's football
- IWL: East Bengal
- IWL 2: HOPS

The 2025–26 season was the 138th competitive association football season in India. The domestic season began in June 2025.

Legend

Win Draw Loss Possible qualification Void or postponed Fixtures

== Men's national football team ==
=== Senior team ===
The following is a list of match results in the 2025–26 season, as well as any future matches that have been scheduled in the season.

==== 2025 ====
CAFA Nations Cup

29 August 2025 CAFA Nations Cup GS	Tajikistan	1–2	India	Hisor, Tajikistan
19:00 IST	Samiev 23'	Report	Anwar 5'; Jhingan 13'	Stadium: Hisor Central Stadium; Referee: Firdavs Norsafarov (Uzbekistan)

1 September 2025 CAFA Nations Cup GS	India	0–3	Iran	Hisor, Tajikistan
17:30 IST		Report	Hosseinzadeh 59'; Alipour 89'; Taremi 90+6'	Stadium: Hisor Central Stadium; Referee: Ilgiz Tantashev (Uzbekistan)

4 September 2025 CAFA Nations Cup GS	Afghanistan	0–0	India	Hisor, Tajikistan
17:30 IST		Report		Stadium: Hisor Central Stadium; Referee: Nurzatbek Abdıkadırov (Kyrgyzstan)

8 September 2025 CAFA Nations Cup Third place match	India	1–1 (a.e.t.) (3–2 p)	Oman	Hisor, Tajikistan
17:00	Kumam 80'	GSA Report AIFF	Al-Yahmadi 55'	Stadium: Hisor Central Stadium; Referee: Firdavs Norsafarov (Uzbekistan)
	Penalties
	Chhangte (penalty scored); Bheke (penalty scored); Ali (penalty missed); Jithin (penalty scored); Kumam (penalty missed)		(penalty missed) Al-Saadi; (penalty missed) Al-Kaabi; (penalty scored) Al-Rushaidi; (penalty scored) Al-Ghassani; (penalty missed) Al-Yahmadi

AFC Asian Cup qualifiers

Group C

Pos	Team	Pld	W	D	L	GF	GA	GD	Pts	Qualification	(Singapore)	(Hong Kong)	(Bangladesh)	(India)
1	Singapore	6	4	2	0	8	4	+4	14	2027 AFC Asian Cup		0–0	1–0	1–1
2	Hong Kong	6	2	2	2	8	8	0	8		1–2		1–1	1–0
3	Bangladesh	6	1	2	3	6	8	−2	5		1–2	3–4		1–0
4	India	6	1	2	3	4	6	−2	5		1–2	2–1	0–0	

Source: AFC
Legend: Blue = home team win; Yellow = draw; Red = away team win.
Rules for classification: Tiebreakers

9 October 2025 2027 ACQ – 3R	Singapore	1–1	India	Kallang, Singapore
17:00	Ikhsan 45+1'	Report; Report (AFC); Report (AIFF)	Rahim 90'	Stadium: National Stadium; Attendance: 13,232; Referee: Shen Yinhao (China)

14 October 2025 2027 ACQ – 3R	India	1–2	Singapore	Margao, India
19:30	Chhangte 14'	Report; Report (AFC); Report (AIFF)	Song Ui-young 44', 58'	Stadium: Jawaharlal Nehru Stadium; Referee: Mohamad Issa (Lebanon)

18 November 2025 2027 ACQ – 3R	Bangladesh	1–0	India	Dhaka, Bangladesh
17:30	Morsalin 11'	Report; Report (AFC); Report (AIFF)		Stadium: National Stadium; Attendance: 23,712; Referee: Clifford Daypuyat (Philippines)

Friendly matches

13 November 2025 Unofficial Friendly	India	6–1	Bhutan	Bengaluru, India
	V. P. Singh; Ali; Williams; Yumnam; Yadwad	Report	Jamtsho	Stadium: Padukone-Dravid Centre for Sports Excellence; Attendance: 0 (Closed Door)

==== 2026 ====
AFC Asian Cup qualifiers

31 March 2026 2027 ACQ – 3R	India	2–1	Hong Kong	Kochi, India
19:00 UTC+5:30	Williams 4'; Mishra 50'	Report; Report (AFC)	Camargo 65'	Stadium: Jawaharlal Nehru International Stadium; Attendance: 22,690; Referee: Songkran Bunmeekiart (Thailand)

Friendly matches

27 May 2026 2026 Unity Cup	India	0–2	Jamaica	London, England
19:30 UTC+1		Report	Clarke 8'; Dixon 78'	Stadium: The Valley; Referee: Darren England (England)

30 May 2026 2026 Unity Cup	Zimbabwe	1–0	India	London, England
14:30 UTC+1	Dube 34' (pen.)	Report		Stadium: The Valley; Referee: Andrew Madley (England)

=== Under-23 ===
==== 2025 ====
Friendly matches

25 August 2025 Friendly	India	1–2	Iraq	Kuala Lumpur, Malaysia
14:30 IST	Sanan 39'	Report	Younis 36'; Zai 72'	Stadium: UM Arena Stadium

28 August 2025 Friendly	India	1–3	Iraq	Kuala Lumpur, Malaysia
13:30 IST		Report		Stadium: Kuala Lumpur Stadium

10 October 2025 Friendly	Indonesia	1–2	India	Jakarta, Indonesia
18:30 IST	Pamungkas 44'	Report	Bhat 5', 26'	Stadium: Gelora Bung Karno Madya Stadium

13 October 2025 Friendly	Indonesia	1–1	India	Jakarta, Indonesia
18:30 IST	Pamungkas 70'	Report	Thingujam 47'	Stadium: Gelora Bung Karno Madya Stadium

15 November 2025 Friendly	Thailand	4–0	India	Pathum Thani, Thailand
17:00 UTC+7	Wandee 32'; Maneekorn 42' (pen.); Otton 47' (pen.); Chotmuangpak 62'	Report		Stadium: Thammasat Stadium

AFC U-23 Asian Cup qualification

Group H

Pos	Team	Pld	W	D	L	GF	GA	GD	Pts	Qualification
1	Qatar (H)	3	3	0	0	17	2	+15	9	Final tournament
2	India	3	2	0	1	9	2	+7	6	
3	Bahrain	3	1	0	2	11	4	+7	3	
4	Brunei	3	0	0	3	0	29	−29	0	

Source: AFC
Rules for classification: Qualification tiebreakers
(H) Hosts

Matches

3 September 2025 2026 AFC U23 Q	Bahrain	0–2	India	Doha, Qatar
20:45 IST		Report	Suhail 32'; Shivaldo 90+5'	Stadium: Suheim bin Hamad Stadium

6 September 2025 2026 AFC U23 Q	Qatar	2–1	India	Doha, Qatar
22:30 IST	Al-Hussein 18'; Al-Sharshani 67' (pen.)	Report	Suhail 52'	Stadium: Abdullah bin Khalifa Stadium

9 September 2025 2026 AFC U23 Q	India	6–0	Brunei	Doha, Qatar
20:45 IST	Vibin 5', 8', 62'; Chhetri 42'; Aimen 87', 90+7'	Report		Stadium: Suheim bin Hamad Stadium

==== 2026 ====
28 March 2026 U-23 Tri-Nation Championship	India	5–0	Bhutan	Yupia, India
19:00 IST	R. M. Haobam 44'; Bhat 51', 81'; T. S. Haobam 79'; Ajsal 85'	Report		Stadium: Golden Jubilee Stadium

31 March 2026 U-23 Tri-Nation Championship	India	0–1	Tajikistan	Yupia, India
19:00 IST		Report	Azizbek 9'	Stadium: Golden Jubilee Stadium; Referee: Crystal John (India)

=== Under-20 ===
SAFF U-20 Championship

Pos	Team	Pld	W	D	L	GF	GA	GD	Pts	Qualification
1	India	2	1	1	0	4	1	+3	4	Advanced to the Semi-finals
2	Bangladesh	2	1	1	0	3	1	+2	4	Advanced to the Semi-finals
3	Pakistan	2	0	0	2	0	5	−5	0	

Source: Sofascore

26 March 2026 2026 SAFF U20 GS	India	3–0	Pakistan	Malé, Maldives
16:15 IST	Vishal 2'; Omang 63', 88' (pen.)			Stadium: National Football Stadium; Referee: Virendha Rai (Bhutan)

28 March 2026 2026 SAFF U20 GS	Bangladesh	1–1	India	Malé, Maldives
16:15 IST	Riyad 45+10'	Report	V. Yadav 17'	Stadium: National Football Stadium; Attendance: 3,932; Referee: Raeef Rauf (Maldives)

1 April 2026 2026 SAFF U20 SF	India	5–0	Bhutan	Malé, Maldives
21:00 IST	Dodum 4'; Arbash 44'; Chaphamayum 56', 57'; Thokchom 90+2'	Report		Stadium: National Football Stadium; Attendance: 726; Referee: Mohamed Rideewita Withana Chirantha (Sri Lanka)

3 April 2026 2026 SAFF U20 Final	Bangladesh	0–0 (4–3 p)	India	Malé, Maldives
21:00 IST		Report		Stadium: National Football Stadium; Attendance: 4,100; Referee: Umesh Bidari (Nepal)
	Penalties
	Murshed (penalty scored); Chandon (penalty scored); Fahim (penalty scored); Raksam (penalty missed); R. Sullivan (penalty scored)		(penalty missed) Rishi; (penalty scored) Arbash; (penalty scored) Samson; (penalty scored) Vishal; (penalty missed) Dodum

=== Under-17 ===
==== 2025 ====
SAFF U-17 Championship

Pos	Team	Pld	W	D	L	GF	GA	GD	Pts	Qualification
1	India	3	3	0	0	10	2	+8	9	Qualified for Knockout stage
2	Pakistan	3	2	0	1	11	5	+6	6	Qualified for Knockout stage
3	Bhutan	3	1	0	2	1	5	−4	3	
4	Maldives	3	0	0	3	2	12	−10	0	

Source: SAFF

16 September 2025 2025 SAFF U17 GS	India	6–0	Maldives	Colombo, Sri Lanka
15:00 IST	Gangte 12', 68' (pen.); Manavathi 29'; Doungel 49'; Wangkheirakpam 59'; Najar 86'	Report		Stadium: Colombo Racecourse Stadium; Attendance: 141; Referee: Kasun L. Weerkakkody (Sri Lanka)

19 September 2025 2025 SAFF U17 GS	Bhutan	0–1	India	Colombo, Sri Lanka
19:30 IST		Report	Ahmed 58'	Stadium: Colombo Racecourse Stadium; Attendance: 171; Referee: Kasun L. Weerkakkody (Sri Lanka)

22 September 2025 2025 SAFF U17 GS	India	3–2	Pakistan	Colombo, Sri Lanka
15:00 IST	Gangte 31'; Wangkheirakpam 63'; R. Ahmed 74'	Report	M. Abdullah 43' (pen.); H. Yasir 70'	Stadium: Colombo Racecourse Stadium; Attendance: 157; Referee: Kasun L. Weerkakkody (Sri Lanka)

25 September 2025 2025 SAFF U17 SF	India	3–0	Nepal	Colombo, Sri Lanka
19:30 IST	Wangkheirakpam 61'; Shah 80'; Thokchom 90+4'	Report		Stadium: Colombo Racecourse Stadium; Attendance: 143; Referee: Afsheen Naseer (Maldives)

27 September 2025 2025 SAFF U17 Final	Bangladesh	2–2 (1–4 p)	India	Colombo, Sri Lanka
19:30 IST	M. Manik 24'; Riduan 90+7'	Report	Gangte 4'; A. Shah 38'	Stadium: Colombo Racecourse Stadium; Attendance: 374; Referee: Pema Tshewang (Bhutan)
	Penalties
	Islami (penalty missed); M. A. Khan (penalty missed); M. Manik (penalty scored)		(penalty scored) Gangte; (penalty scored) Konthoujam; (penalty scored) I. R. Magar; (penalty scored) Poonia

Friendly

8 October 2025 Friendly	China	4–0	India	Xianghe, China
		Report		Stadium: National Football Training Centre

10 October 2025 Friendly	China	0–1	India	Xianghe, China
		Report	Wangkheirakpam 75'	Stadium: National Football Training Centre

AFC U-17 Asian Cup qualification

Group D

Pos	Team	Pld	W	D	L	GF	GA	GD	Pts	Qualification
1	India (H)	4	2	1	1	6	5	+1	7 (Note: Head-to-head points: India 3, Iran 0)	Final tournament
2	Iran	4	2	1	1	10	4	+6	7	
3	Lebanon	4	1	3	0	4	2	+2	6	
4	Palestine	4	1	2	1	6	6	0	5	
5	Chinese Taipei	4	0	1	3	2	11	−9	1	

Source: AFC
Rules for classification: Qualification tiebreakers
(H) Hosts
Notes:

22 November 2025 2026 AFC U17 ACQ	Palestine	1–1	India	Ahmedabad, India
19:30	Jomah 74'	Report	Poonia 45'	Stadium: EKA Arena

26 November 2025 2026 AFC U17 ACQ	India	3–1	Chinese Taipei	Ahmedabad, India
19:30	Gangte 32', 77', 79'	Report	Yang Hao-wei 4'	Stadium: EKA Arena; Referee: Mohamed Rashid Ismail (UAE)

28 November 2025 2026 AFC U17 ACQ	India	0–2	Lebanon	Ahmedabad, India
19:00 IST		Report	Assaf 26'; Maakaroun 38'	Stadium: EKA Arena; Referee: Wissam Rabie (Syria)

30 November 2025 2026 AFC U17 ACQ	Iran	1–2	India	Ahmedabad, India
20:30 IST	Valipoor 19'	Report	Gangte 45+1' (pen.); Wangkheirakpam 52'	Stadium: EKA Arena

==== 2026 ====
Friendly

29 January 2026 Friendly	India	4–2	Tajikistan	Margao, India
16:00 IST	Gangte 8'; Wangkhem 48'; ?? 75' (o.g.); Ngangom 90+1'	Report	Odilzoda 18'; Sattorov 66'	Stadium: Jawaharlal Nehru Stadium

1 February 2026 Friendly	India	0–0	Tajikistan	Margao, India
16:00 IST		Report		Stadium: Jawaharlal Nehru Stadium

10 February 2026 Friendly	Turkey	1–0	India	Manavgat, Turkey
14:30 IST	Erdoğan 12' (pen.)	Report		Stadium: Emirhan Sports Center

12 February 2026 Friendly	Turkey	6–1	India	Manavgat, Turkey
14:30 IST	Seçil 7'; Fettahoğlu 14' (pen.); Ekici 20', 28'; Sayar 30'; Tuncel 85'	Report	Wangkhem 47'	Stadium: Emirhan Sports Center

12 February 2026 Unofficial Friendly	India	4–2	(Russia) Spartak Moscow U17	Serik, Turkey
	Ningthoujam 31'; Wangkheirakpam 57'; Ngangom 61'; Bin 82'	Report	?? 65'; ?? 86' (pen.)	Stadium: Fanatic Tour Serik Sport Center

3 March 2026 Friendly	Myanmar	1–2	India	Yangon, Myanmar
05:45 IST	Ko Ko 54'	Report	Ngangom 11'; Wangkheirakpam 24'	Stadium: Thuwunna Stadium; Referee: Khin Maung Soe (Myanmar)

5 March 2026 Friendly	Myanmar	0–0	India	Yangon, Myanmar
05:00 IST		Report		Stadium: Thuwunna Stadium; Referee: Thura Zaw (Myanmar)

25 March 2026 Friendly	Thailand	2–2	India	Lopburi, Thailand
17:30 IST	39', 86'	Report	Wangkheirakpam 22'; Wangkhem 67'	Stadium: Phra Ramesuan Stadium

28 March 2026 Friendly	India	3–0	Indonesia	Lopburi, Thailand
17:30 IST	Ngangom 17'; Wangkheirakpam 20', 58'	Report		Stadium: Phra Ramesuan Stadium

31 March 2026 Friendly	India	1–2	South Korea	Lopburi, Thailand
15:30 IST	Wangkheirakpam 32'	Report	5', 82'	Stadium: Phra Ramesuan Stadium

17 April 2026 Friendly	India	1–0	United Arab Emirates	Samut Prakan, Thailand
16:30 IST	Shah 27'	Report		Stadium: Windmill Football Club

21 April 2026 Friendly	India	1–5	United Arab Emirates	Samut Prakan, Thailand
16:30 IST	Gangte 89'	Report	5 x	Stadium: Windmill Football Club

25 April 2026 Friendly	Qatar	1–1	India	Doha, Qatar
21:30 IST	Goal	Report	Wangkhem 67'

28 April 2026 Friendly	Qatar	0–0	India	Doha, Qatar
21:30 IST		Report		Stadium: Hamad bin Khalifa Stadium

AFC U-17 Asian Cup

Group stage

Pos	Team	Pld	W	D	L	GF	GA	GD	Pts	Qualification
1	Uzbekistan	2	2	0	0	5	0	+5	6	Knockout stage and FIFA U-17 World Cup
2	Australia	2	1	0	1	4	2	+2	3	Knockout stage and FIFA U-17 World Cup
3	India	2	0	0	2	0	7	−7	0	
4	North Korea	0	0	0	0	0	0	0	0	Disqualified

Source: AFC
Rules for classification: Group stage tiebreakers

6 May 2026 2026 AFC U17 GS	Australia	4–0	India	Jeddah, Saudi Arabia
21:30 IST	Becvinovski 4'; Court 29' (pen.); Demuth 74'; Oliveira 86'	Report		Stadium: King Abdullah Sports City Training Stadium (Pitch C); Attendance: 72; Referee: Lothar D'hondt (Belgium)

10 May 2026 2026 AFC U17 GS	India	0–3	Uzbekistan	Jeddah, Saudi Arabia
22:30 IST	Abduraimov 32' (pen.); Singh 60' (o.g.); Ravshanbekov 78'	Report		Stadium: King Abdullah Sports City Hall Stadium; Attendance: 58; Referee: Abdullah Al-Shehri (Saudi Arabia)

13 May 2026 2026 AFC U17 GS	North Korea	Cancelled (Note: North Korea withdrew due to concerns related to the 2026 Iran war, leaving the tournament at 15 teams.)	India	Jeddah, Saudi Arabia
21:30 IST				Stadium: King Abdullah Sports City Training Stadium (Pitch C)

== Women's national football team ==
=== Senior team ===
The following is a list of match results in the 2025–26 season, as well as any future matches that have been scheduled in the season.

==== 2025 ====
Group H

Pos	Team	Pld	W	D	L	GF	GA	GD	Pts	Qualification
1	India	4	4	0	0	24	1	+23	12	Final tournament
2	Thailand (H)	4	3	0	1	23	2	+21	9	
3	Timor-Leste	4	1	1	2	3	9	−6	4	
4	Iraq	4	1	1	2	5	14	−9	4	
5	Mongolia	4	0	0	4	3	32	−29	0	

Source: AFC
Rules for classification: Qualification tiebreakers
(H) Hosts

Matches

23 June 2026 AFC ACQ	Mongolia	0–13	India	Chiang Mai, Thailand
16:00		Report	Basfore 8'; Guguloth 20', 59'; Xaxa 29', 45', 46', 52', 55'; Haldar 67'; Malavika P. 71'; Priyadharshini 73', 86'; Dangmei 75' (pen.)	Stadium: 700th Anniversary Stadium; Referee: Jon Sol-mi (North Korea)

29 June 2026 AFC ACQ	India	4–0	Timor-Leste	Chiang Mai, Thailand
16:00	Kalyan 12', 80'; Tamang 58'; Kom 85'	Report		Stadium: 700th Anniversary Stadium; Referee: Doumouh Albakkar (Lebanon)

2 July 2026 AFC ACQ	India	5–0	Iraq	Chiang Mai, Thailand
16:00	Basfore 14'; Kalyan 44'; Angamuthu 48'; Phanjoubam 64'; Nongmaithem 80'	Report		Stadium: 700th Anniversary Stadium; Referee: Azusa Sugino (Japan)

5 July 2026 AFC ACQ	Thailand	1–2	India	Chiang Mai, Thailand
19:30	Chatchawan 47'	Report	Basfore 29', 74'	Stadium: 700th Anniversary Stadium; Referee: Kim Yu-jeong (South Korea)

Friendly matches

21 October Friendly	Iran	2–0	India	Shillong, India
18:00	Didar 67', 74'	Report		Stadium: Jawaharlal Nehru Stadium; Referee: Pansa Chaisanit (Thailand)

27 October Friendly	India	1–2	Nepal	Shillong, India
18:00	Shirvoikar 81'	Report	Bhandari 2', 63'	Stadium: Jawaharlal Nehru Stadium; Referee: Pansa Chaisanit (Thailand)

29 October Unofficial friendly	India	1–1 (0–3 p)	Nepal	Gangtok, India
16:45 UTC+5:30	Guguloth 30'	Report	Ghising 45+2'	Stadium: Paljor Stadium; Referee: Meera Tamang (Bhutan)
	Penalties
	Priyadharshini (penalty missed); Santosh (penalty missed); Oraon (penalty missed)		S. Magar (penalty scored); Ghising (penalty scored); Basnet (penalty missed); Thokar (penalty scored)

==== 2026 ====
AFC Women's Asian Cup

Group C

Pos	Team	Pld	W	D	L	GF	GA	GD	Pts	Qualification
1	Japan	3	3	0	0	17	0	+17	9	Advance to knockout stage
2	Chinese Taipei	3	2	0	1	4	3	+1	6	Advance to knockout stage
3	Vietnam	3	1	0	2	2	6	−4	3	
4	India	3	0	0	3	2	16	−14	0	

Source: AFC

4 March AFC Women's Asian Cup GS	Vietnam	2–1	India	Perth, Australia
16:30 IST	Ngân Thị Vạn Sự 30', 90+4'	Report (AFC); Report (FIFA)	Nongrum 52'	Stadium: Perth Rectangular Stadium; Attendance: 1,961; Referee: Kim Yu-jeong (South Korea)

7 March AFC Women's Asian Cup GS	India	0–11	Japan	Perth, Australia
16:30 IST		Report (AFC); Report (FIFA)	Yamamoto 4'; Hasegawa 13'; Miyazawa 20', 35', 81'; Seike 45+5', 55'; Ueki 47', 50', 65'; Hijikata 62'	Stadium: Perth Rectangular Stadium; Attendance: 3,233; Referee: Veronika Bernatskaia (Kyrgyzstan)

10 March AFC Women's Asian Cup GS	India	1–3	Chinese Taipei	Sydney, Australia
14:30 IST	Manisha 39'	Report (AFC); Report (FIFA)	Su Yu-hsuan 12'; P. Chanu 45+9' (o.g.); Chen Yu-chin 77'	Stadium: Western Sydney Stadium; Attendance: 3,648; Referee: Casey Reibelt (Australia)

FIFA Series

11 April 2026 FIFA Series	Kenya	2–0	India	Nairobi, Kenya
18:00 UTC+3	Amnyolet 2'; Engesha 57'	FIFA; AIFF		Stadium: Nyayo National Stadium; Referee: Josephine Nantongo (Uganda)

15 April 2026 FIFA Series	India	3–2	Malawi	Nairobi, Kenya
16:30 IST	Oraon 18'; A. Singh 45+1'; Selladurai 84'	Report (FIFA)	Khumalo 43'; Henry 60'	Stadium: Nyayo National Stadium; Referee: Yordanos Mulugeta (Ethiopia)

SAFF Championship

Group B

Pos	Team	Pld	W	D	L	GF	GA	GD	Pts	Qualification
1	India (H)	2	2	0	0	14	0	+14	6	Advance to knockout stage
2	Bangladesh	2	1	0	1	4	5	−1	3	Advance to knockout stage
3	Maldives	2	0	0	2	2	15	−13	0	

Source: SAFF
Rules for classification: 1) points; 2) head-to-head points; 3) head-to-head goal difference; 4) goal difference; 5) number of goals scored; 6) drawing of lots
(H) Hosts

25 May 2026 2026 SAFF GS	Maldives	0–11	India	Margao, India
19:30 IST		Report	Naorem 10', 17'; Xaxa 29'; A. Singh 34', 66', 70', 86'; Dangmei 39'; Shirvoikar 52', 68'; Basfore 60'	Stadium: Jawaharlal Nehru Stadium; Attendance: 225; Referee: Sharaban Tahura (Bangladesh)

31 May 2026 2026 SAFF GS	India	3–0	Bangladesh	Margao, India
19:30 IST	Xaxa 36'; Kom 78' (pen.); Prasad 90+1'	Report		Stadium: Jawaharlal Nehru Stadium; Attendance: 553; Referee: Choki Om (Bhutan)

3 June 2026 2026 SAFF SF	India	1–0	Bhutan	Margao, India
18:30	Nongrum 58'	Report		Stadium: Jawaharlal Nehru Stadium; Attendance: 324; Referee: Yapa Appuhamilage Pabasara Minisaraniyapa (Sri Lanka)

5 June 2026 2026 SAFF Final	Bangladesh	1–3	India	Margao, India
18:30	R. Chakma 45+1'	Report	Xaxa 42'; Nongrum 46'; Kom 82'	Stadium: Jawaharlal Nehru Stadium; Attendance: 729; Referee: Anjana Rai (Nepal)

=== Under-20 ===
==== 2025 ====
Friendly matches

14 July 2025 Friendly	Uzbekistan	1–1	India	Tashkent, Uzbekistan
20:30 UTC+5:30	Egamberdiyeva 38'	Report	Raul 79'	Stadium: Do'stlik Stadium

16 July 2025 Friendly	Uzbekistan	1–4	India	Tashkent, Uzbekistan
20:30 UTC+5:30	Dekanbaeva 39'	Report	Nongmeikapam 28', 85'; Raul 65'; Sillay 71'	Stadium: Do'stlik Stadium

25 October 2025 Friendly	Kazakhstan	2–3	India	Shymkent, Kazakhstan
11:30 UTC+5:30	Talasbayeva 23' (pen.); Aldanazar 84' (pen.)	Report	Nongmeikapam 2'; Kayenpaibam 15'; Pooja 41'	Stadium: Sports Complex BIIK Shymkent

28 October 2025 Friendly	Kazakhstan	1–1	India	Shymkent, Kazakhstan
11:30 UTC+5:30	Bekkozhina 47'	Report	Pooja 55'	Stadium: Sports Complex BIIK Shymkent

29 November 2025 Friendly	India	1–0	Uzbekistan	Mamallapuram, India
17:00 UTC+5:30				Stadium: Scamper Park (FC Madras Academy)

2 December 2025 Friendly	India	4–2	Uzbekistan	Mamallapuram, India
17:00 UTC+5:30				Stadium: Scamper Park (FC Madras Academy)

AFC U-20 Women's Asian Cup qualification

Group D

Pos	Team	Pld	W	D	L	GF	GA	GD	Pts	Qualification
1	India	3	2	1	0	8	0	+8	7	Final tournament
2	Indonesia	3	1	2	0	6	2	+4	5	
3	Myanmar (H)	3	1	1	1	8	4	+4	4	
4	Turkmenistan	3	0	0	3	1	17	−16	0	

Source: AFC
Rules for classification: Qualification tiebreakers
(H) Hosts

Matches

6 August 2025 2026 AFC U20 WACQ	India	0–0	Indonesia	Yangon, Myanmar
18:00 UTC+5:30		Report		Stadium: Thuwunna Stadium; Referee: Nurul Ain Izatty Zainal (MAS)

8 August 2025 2026 AFC U20 WACQ	Turkmenistan	0–7	India	Yangon, Myanmar
18:00 UTC+5:30		Report	Singh 7', 42'; Nongmeikapam 14'; Toijam 35'; Raul 38', 90+6'; Pooja 65'	Stadium: Thuwunna Stadium; Referee: Sunita Thongthawin (THA)

10 August 2025 2026 AFC U20 WACQ	Myanmar	0–1	India	Yangon, Myanmar
15:00 UTC+5:30		Report	Pooja 27'	Stadium: Thuwunna Stadium; Referee: Nurul Ain Izatty Zainal (Malaysia)

==== 2026 ====
SAFF U-19 Women's Championship

India fielded their U-17 national team as a preparatory tournament for the 2026 AFC U-17 Women's Asian Cup.

- Check for Under-17 results below

Friendly matches

19 February Unofficial friendly	Hammarby women (Sweden men's national football team)	6–0	India	Stockholm, Sweden
18:30 IST	16', 22', 53', 59', 77', 85'	Report		Stadium: Hammarby IP

22 February Unofficial friendly	Täby women (Sweden men's national football team)	0–4	India	Lidingö, Sweden
–:– IST		Report	B. Kumari 10', 63'; Kipgen 23'; Sillay 80'	Stadium: Bosön

25 February Unofficial friendly	Enskede women (Sweden men's national football team)	1–1	India	Lidingö, Sweden
–:– IST	?? 88'	Report	Nongmeikapam 44'	Stadium: Bosön

28 February Unofficial friendly	Karlbergs women (Sweden men's national football team)	2–1	India	Lidingö, Sweden
–:– IST	?? 58'; ?? 72'	Report	Sillay 56'	Stadium: Bosön

5 March Unofficial friendly	Älvsjö women (Sweden men's national football team)	2–5	India	Lidingö, Sweden
–:– IST	??; ??	Report	Kipgen 1', 20' (pen.), 59'; Colney 34'; Raul 90'	Stadium: Bosön

AFC U-20 Women's Asian Cup

Group C

Pos	Team	Pld	W	D	L	GF	GA	GD	Pts	Qualification
1	Japan	3	3	0	0	13	2	+11	9	Knockout stage
2	Australia	3	2	0	1	12	5	+7	6	Knockout stage
3	India	3	1	0	2	3	12	−9	3	
4	Chinese Taipei	3	0	0	3	1	10	−9	0	

Source: AFC
Rules for classification: Qualification tiebreakers

2 April 2026 2026 AFC U20 GS	Japan	6–0	India	Bangkok, Thailand
18:30 IST	Chanu 12' (o.g.); Kimura 54'; Fukushima 57'; Tago 75'; Matsunaga 81'; Y. Honda 87'	Report		Stadium: Thammasat Stadium; Attendance: 47; Referee: Khin Nyein Chan (Myanmar)

5 April 2026 2026 AFC U20 GS	India	0–5	Australia	Pathum Thani, Thailand
14:30 IST		Report	Halmarick 38' (pen.), 39', 48'; Butrus 54'; Brown 90+4'	Stadium: Pathum Thani Stadium; Referee: Esra'a Al-Mbaidin (Jordan)

8 April 2026 2026 AFC U20 GS	Chinese Taipei	1–3	India	Pathum Thani, Thailand
14:30 IST	Kao Hsin 90+3'	Report	Khumukcham 26'; Nongmeikapam 32', 87' (pen.)	Stadium: Pathum Thani Stadium; Attendance: 30; Referee: Bùi Thị Thu Trang (Vietnam)

=== Under-17 ===
==== 2025 ====
SAFF U-17 Women's Championship

Pos	Team	Pld	W	D	L	GF	GA	GD	Pts	Status
1	India	6	5	0	1	30	4	+26	15	Champion
2	Bangladesh	6	4	1	1	15	8	+7	13	
3	Nepal	6	1	1	4	4	21	−17	4	
4	Bhutan (H)	6	0	2	4	4	20	−16	2	

Source: SAFF
Rules for classification: 1) points; 2) head-to-head points; 3) head-to-head goal difference; 4) goal difference; 5) number of goals scored;
(H) Hosts

20 August 2025 2025 SAFF U17	India	7–0	Nepal	Thimphu, Bhutan
14:30 IST	Basnett 16', 41'; Longjam 25', 56'; A. Kumari 33', 62'; Nongmaithem 45+1'	Report		Stadium: Changlimithang Stadium; Referee: Tahura Sharaban (Bangladesh)

22 August 2025 2025 SAFF U17	Bangladesh	0–2	India	Thimphu, Bhutan
14:30 IST		Report	P. Fernandes 14'; Shullai 76'	Stadium: Changlimithang Stadium; Referee: Pabasara Minisarani Yapa (Sri Lanka)

24 August 2025 2025 SAFF U17	Bhutan	0–8	India	Thimphu, Bhutan
14:30 IST		Report	Basnett 23', 88'; A. Kumari 53', 61', 72'; P. Fernandes 71'; Linda 77'; V. Fernandes 90+2'	Stadium: Changlimithang Stadium; Referee: Tahura Sharaban (Bangladesh)

27 August 2025 2025 SAFF U17	India	5–0	Bhutan	Thimphu
17:30 IST	A. kumari 4', 16'; Rani 24'; Nongmaithem 77'; Chanu 90+5'	Report		Stadium: Changlimithang Stadium; Referee: Kriti Sen (Nepal)

29 August 2025 2025 SAFF U17	India	5–0	Nepal	Thimphu, Bhutan
17:30 IST	Longjam 5'; P. Fernandes 15', 43'; Linda 79', 90+2'	Report		Stadium: Changlimithang Stadium; Referee: Sharaban Tahura (Bangladesh)

31 August 2025 2025 SAFF U17	Bangladesh	4–3	India	Thimphu, Bhutan
14:30 IST	Purnima 1'; Alpi 34'; Prity 49', 90+5'	Report	Anushka 9'; Pritika 65'; Nongmaithem 89'	Stadium: Changlimithang Stadium; Referee: Meera Tamang (Bhutan)

AFC U-17 Women's Asian Cup qualification

Pos	Team	Pld	W	D	L	GF	GA	GD	Pts	Qualification
1	India	2	2	0	0	4	2	+2	6	Final tournament
2	Kyrgyzstan (H)	2	1	0	1	3	3	0	3	
3	Uzbekistan	2	0	0	2	2	4	−2	0	

Source: AFC
Rules for classification: Qualification tiebreakers
(H) Hosts

13 October 2025 2026 AFC U17 WAC Qual.	Kyrgyzstan	1–2	India	Bishkek, Kyrgyzstan
18:30	Saiakbaeva 34'	Report	P. Fernandes 26'; Nongmaithem 90'	Stadium: Dolen Omurzakov Stadium; Referee: Haneen Murad (Jordan)

17 October 2025 2026 AFC U17 WAC Qual.	India	2–1	Uzbekistan	Bishkek, Kyrgyzstan
18:30	Baskey 55'; Kumari 66'	Report	Alikhonova 38'	Stadium: Dolen Omurzakov Stadium; Referee: Park Se-jin (South Korea)

==== 2026 ====
SAFF U-19 Women's Championship

India fielded their U17 national team, though the tournament is for U20 age group, as a preparatory tournament for the 2026 U-17 Women's Asian Cup.

Standing

Pos	Team	Pld	W	D	L	GF	GA	GD	Pts	Qualification	BAN	IND	NEP	BHU
1	Bangladesh	3	3	0	0	18	0	+18	9	Qualified for the Final		2–0	4–0	12–0
2	India	3	2	0	1	9	2	+7	6	Qualified for the Final			1–0	8–0
3	Nepal	3	1	0	2	2	6	−4	3					2–1
4	Bhutan	3	0	0	3	1	22	−21	0					

Source: Sofascore
Legend: Blue = home team win; Yellow = draw; Red = away team win.
Rules for classification: 1) points; 2) head-to-head points; 3) head-to-head goal difference; 4) goal difference; 5) goals scored

31 January 2025 2026 SAFF U19 Gr. Stage	India	1–0	Nepal U19	Pokhara, Nepal
14:45 IST	P. Fernandes 49'	Report		Stadium: Pokhara Rangasala; Attendance: 116; Referee: Tshering Yangkhey (Bhutan)

2 February 2025 2026 SAFF U19 Gr. Stage	Bangladesh U19	2–0	India	Pokhara, Nepal
11:45 IST	Biswas 29'; A. Akter 40'	Report		Stadium: Pokhara Rangasala; Attendance: 250; Referee: Choki Om (Bhutan)

4 February 2025 2026 SAFF U19 Gr. Stage	India	8–0	Bhutan U19	Pokhara, Nepal
11:45 IST	Lyngdoh 6'; Basnett 10'; P. Fernandes 16', 38', 40'; Linda 17'; Barman 25', 89'	Report		Stadium: Pokhara Rangasala; Attendance: 150; Referee: Saraban Tahura (Bangladesh)

7 February 2026 2026 SAFF U19 Final	Bangladesh U19	0–4	India	Pokhara, Nepal
14:45 IST		Report	Nongmaithem 42'; Lakra 63' (pen.); P. Fernandes 68'; Raghuraman 83'	Stadium: Pokhara Rangasala; Attendance: and 250; Referee: Om Choki (Bhutan)

Friendly matches

12 March 2026 Friendly	Myanmar	0–2	India	Yangon. Myanmar
16:00 IST		Report	Barman 38', 49'	Stadium: Thuwunna Stadium; Referee: Zin Mar Oo (Myanmar)

14 March 2026 Friendly	Myanmar	2–3	India	Yangon. Myanmar
16:00 IST	War Kyaw 12'; May Zitar 45'	Report	Senjam 33'; A. Kumari 88'; Joya 90+1'	Stadium: Thuwunna Stadium; Referee: Khin Nyein Chan (Myanmar)

11 April 2026 Friendly	Russia	4–0	India	Sochi, Russia
14:30 IST	Menyailova 44'; Dobrovitskaya 57' (pen.); Klimova 72' (pen.); Gulyaeva 88'	RFU; AIFF		Stadium: Matsesta Football Center

14 April 2026 Friendly	Russia	3–0	India	Sochi, Russia
14:30 IST	Svyatnaya 18'; Menyailova 49', 52'	RFU; AIFF		Stadium: Matsesta Football Center; Referee: Alexandra Ponomareva (Russia)

17 April 2026 Friendly	Russia	3–0	India	Sochi, Russia
14:30 IST	Menyailova 46'; Frolova 80'; Bykhanova 90+2'	RFU; AIFF		Stadium: Matsesta Football Center; Referee: Nadezhda Gorinova (Russia)

AFC U-17 Women's Asian Cup

Group stage

Pos	Team	Pld	W	D	L	GF	GA	GD	Pts	Qualification
1	Japan	3	3	0	0	21	0	+21	9	Knockout stage
2	Australia	3	1	1	1	3	6	−3	4	Knockout stage
3	India	3	1	0	2	4	5	−1	3	Knockout stage
4	Lebanon	3	0	1	2	1	18	−17	1	

Source: AFC
Rules for classification: Qualification tiebreakers

2 May 2026 2026 AFC U17 WAC GS	Australia	2–0	India	Suzhou, China
17:00 IST	Mouitys-Mickalad 25'; Basnett 59' (o.g.)	Report		Stadium: Suzhou Taihu Football Sports Centre (Pitch 8); Attendance: 80; Referee: Maïka Vanderstichel (France)

5 May 2026 2026 AFC U17 WAC GS	India	0–3	Japan	Suzhou, China
17:00 IST	Hayashi 59'; Ikeda 76', 81'	Report		Stadium: Suzhou Taihu Football Sports Centre (Pitch 4); Attendance: 124; Referee: Trần Thị Thanh (Vietnam)

8 May 2026 2026 AFC U17 WAC GS	India	4–0	Lebanon	Suzhou, China
13:00 IST	Barman 7', 85'; Senjam 36'; Joya 72'	Report		Stadium: Suzhou Taihu Football Sports Centre (Pitch 8); Attendance: 37; Referee: Sunita Thongthawin (Thailand)

11 May 2026 2026 AFC U17 WAC QF	China	3–0	India	Suzhou, China
17:00 IST	Huang Qinyi 38'; Liu Yuxi 45+4' (pen.); Li Qixian 90'	Report		Stadium: Suzhou Sports Centre Stadium; Attendance: 1,375; Referee: Park Se-jin (South Korea)

== Men's national futsal team ==
=== 2025 ===
Friendlies

13 September 2025 Friendly	Lebanon	7–2	India	Beirut, Lebanon
21:30 IST	Jaoude 5'; Maatouk 11', 29'; Koukezian 14', 27'; Hamouch 17'; Osman 36'	Report	D'Souza 31'; Adhikari 38'	Stadium: Al Sadaka Sporting Complex

15 September 2025 Friendly	Lebanon	7–4	India	Beirut, Lebanon
21:30 IST	Rhayem 1', 23'; Hamouch 3'; Koukezian 13'; Hamam 28'; Jaoude 29'; Kobeissi 38'	Report	Laltlansanga 8'; Marshall 19'; Mali 20'; Shah 30'	Stadium: Al Sadaka Sporting Complex

2026 AFC Futsal Asian Cup qualifiers

Pos	Team	Pld	W	D	L	GF	GA	GD	Pts	Qualification
1	Australia	3	2	1	0	20	4	+16	7	Final tournament
2	Kuwait (H)	3	2	1	0	12	5	+7	7	Final tournament
3	India	3	1	0	2	5	14	−9	3	
4	Mongolia	3	0	0	3	3	17	−14	0	

Source: AFC
Rules for classification: Qualification tiebreakers
(H) Hosts

20 September 2025 2026 AFC Futsal Qual	Kuwait	4–1	India	Ardiya, Kuwait
22:30 IST	Fadhel 10'; Sarraj 18'; Ajmi 27'; Basi 37'	Report	Laltlansanga 9'	Stadium: Qushaian Al-Mutairi Hall

22 September 2025 2026 AFC Futsal Qual	India	1–10	Australia	Ardiya, Kuwait
18:30 IST	D'Souza 15'	Report	Rogan 5', 32'; Kouta 5'; Sewell 11', 32'; Garner 17'; Guerreiro 18', 35'; Giovenali 20'; De Melo 21'	Stadium: Qushaian Al-Mutairi Hall

24 September 2025 2026 AFC Futsal Qual	Mongolia	0–3	India	Ardiya, Kuwait
18:30 IST		Report	D'Souza 17', 33'; A. Adhikari 35'	Stadium: Qushaian Al-Mutairi Hall

=== 2026 ===
2026 SAFF Futsal Championship

Pos	Team	Pld	W	D	L	GF	GA	GD	Pts	Result	MDV	IND	NEP	PAK	BAN	SRI	BHU
1	Maldives (C)	6	6	0	0	28	6	+22	18	Champions		5–0	2–1		6–1		
2	India	6	3	2	1	26	17	+9	11	Runners-up			3–3	4–1	4–4		
3	Nepal	6	3	2	1	18	12	+6	11	Third-place							
4	Pakistan	6	3	1	2	20	20	0	10		1–7		4–4			5–2	4–2
5	Bangladesh	6	2	1	3	16	21	−5	7				1–4	1–5		5–1	4–1
6	Sri Lanka	6	0	1	5	10	24	−14	1		2–5	1–4	1–2				3–3
7	Bhutan	6	0	1	5	11	29	−18	1		1–3	3–11	1–4				

Source: GSA
Legend: Blue = home team win; Yellow = draw; Red = away team win.
(C) Champions

14 January 2026 SAFF Futsal Championship	India	4–4	Bangladesh	Bangkok, Thailand
16:30	Anmol Adhikari 12'; Lalsawmpuia 20'; K Roluahpuia 27', 36'	Report	Md Moin Ahmed 9', 31'; Md Rahbar Wahed Khan 16', 37'	Stadium: Nonthaburi Stadium; Attendance: 70; Referee: Chris Sinclair (England)

18 January 2026 SAFF Futsal Championship	India	3–3	Nepal	Bangkok, Thailand
14:00	Laltluangzela 6'; Anmol Adhikari 39'; Nikhil Rajendra Mali 40'	Report	Bikrant Narsing Rana 5'; Amit Lama 25'; Bijay Shrestha 40'	Stadium: Nonthaburi Stadium; Attendance: 56; Referee: Ali Ahmadi (Iran)

20 January 2026 SAFF Futsal Championship	Maldives	5–0	India	Bangkok, Thailand
16:30	Mohamed Imran 12', 30'; Abdulla Shafiu 22'; Ali Shamal Abdulla 24'; Ahmed Hameed 40'	Report		Stadium: Nonthaburi Stadium; Attendance: 50; Referee: Ali Hafizi (Iran)

22 January 2026 SAFF Futsal Championship	Bhutan	3–11	India	Bangkok, Thailand
19:00	Jigme Tshultrim 11'; Jetsuen Dorji 15'; Nima Wangdi 35'	Report	Jonathan Lalrawngbawla 4'; Jignam Seltob Dorji 6' (o.g.); Laltluangzela 9', 39'; Lalsawmpuia 15'; Anmol Adhikari 17', 32'; Seon D'Souza 34'; Nikhil Mali 40', 40', 40'	Stadium: Nonthaburi Stadium; Attendance: 50; Referee: Mohammad Javed Ehtesham (Iran)

24 January 2026 2026 SAFF Championship	Sri Lanka	1–4	India	Bangkok, Thailand
17:30 IST	Mohamed Kursheeth 19'	Report	Seon D'Souza 3', 20'; Lalsawmpuia 10'; Nikhil Mali 12'	Stadium: Nonthaburi Stadium; Attendance: 19; Referee: Chonlakan Luangsa-Ard (Thailand)

26 January 2026 2026 SAFF Championship	India	4–1	Pakistan	Bangkok, Thailand
17:30 IST	Laltluangzela 6'; Lalsawmpuia 25', 40'; Nikhil Mali 32'	Report	Ali Agha 19'	Stadium: Nonthaburi Stadium; Attendance: 135; Referee: Chris Sinclair (New Zealand)

== Women's national futsal team ==
The following is a list of match results in the 2025–26 season, as well as any future matches that have been scheduled in the season.

=== 2026 ===
2026 SAFF Women's Futsal Championship

Pos	Team	Pld	W	D	L	GF	GA	GD	Pts	Result	BAN	IND	BHU	NEP	PAK	SRI	MDV
1	Bangladesh (C)	6	5	1	0	38	10	+28	16	Champions		3–1	3–3	3–0	9–1	6–3	14–2
2	India	6	4	0	2	31	12	+19	12	Runners-up				8–1	5–3		
3	Bhutan	6	3	2	1	18	13	+5	11	Third-place		2–1				5–1	4–2
4	Nepal	6	3	1	2	18	17	+1	10				5–3		5–1		
5	Pakistan	6	2	1	3	12	23	−11	7				1–1			3–2	
6	Sri Lanka	6	1	1	4	17	27	−10	4			2–5		2–2			7–6
7	Maldives	6	0	0	6	12	44	−32	0			1–11		0–5	1–3		

Source: Matchfoari
Legend: Blue = home team win; Yellow = draw; Red = away team win.
(C) Champions

13 January 2026 SAFF W Futsal	Maldives	1–11	India	Bangkok, Thailand
14:00	Achom Degio 39' (o.g.)	Report	Mithila Ramani 4'; Ritika Singh 6', 17'; Khushbu Saroj 17', 22', 24', 26'; Sonali Mondal 17', 37'; Nishka Parkash 33', 34'	Stadium: Nonthaburi Stadium; Attendance: 20; Referee: Khamprasong Xayavongsy (Laos)

15 January 2026 SAFF W Futsal	Bangladesh	3–1	India	Bangkok, Thailand
14:00	Khatun 7', 13'; Matsushima 31'	Report	Arya Dhanaji More 37'	Stadium: Hua Mak Stadium; Attendance: 50; Referee: Benjapol Mucharoensap (Thailand)

17 January 2026 SAFF W Futsal	India	8–1	Nepal	Bangkok, Thailand
16:30	Diti Kanungo 4', 4', 13', 15'; Nishka Parkash 8'; Ritika Singh 22', 37'; Khushbu Saroj 24'	Report	Manisha Thapa Magar 8'	Stadium: Nonthaburi Stadium; Attendance: 40; Referee: Benjapol Mucharoensap (Thailand)

19 January 2026 SAFF W Futsal	India	5–3	Pakistan	Bangkok, Thailand
19:00	Arya More 14'; Ritika Singh 28'; Khushbu Saroj 29'; Diti Kanungo 37', 40'	Report	Kayanat Bokhari 4'; Azwa Chaudhry 26'; Anmool Hira 27'	Stadium: Nonthaburi Stadium; Attendance: 50; Referee: Nattakit Hintua (Thailand)

23 January 2026 SAFF W Futsal	Bhutan	2–1	India	Bangkok, Thailand
19:00	Jamyang Choden 20'; Deki Lhazom 28'	Report	Khushbu Saroj 36'	Stadium: Nonthaburi Stadium; Attendance: 43; Referee: Ali Ahmadi (Iran)

25 January 2026 SAFF W Futsal	Sri Lanka	2–5	India	Bangkok, Thailand
16:30	Shanu Paskaran 22'; Gowry Surenthiran 28'	Report	Sonali Mondal 6', 7', 16'; Mithila Ramani 9'; Pooja Munnalal Gupta 36'	Stadium: Hua Mak Stadium; Attendance: 50; Referee: Benjapol Mucharoensap (Thailand)

== AFC club competitions (men's) ==
=== AFC Champions League Two ===
==== Qualifying play-offs ====
13 August 2025 Preliminary stage	Goa (All India Football Federation)	2–1	(Oman Football Association) Al-Seeb	Goa, India
19:30 IST	Dražić 24'; Siverio 52'	AFC; GSA	Nasser 60'	Stadium: Jawaharlal Nehru Stadium; Attendance: 12,314; Referee: Zhang Lei (China)

==== Group stage ====
===== Group C =====
Pos	Team	Pld	W	D	L	GF	GA	GD	Pts	Qualification	ALH	SEP	AHA	MBG
1	(Jordan) Al-Hussein	4	3	0	1	8	4	+4	9	Advance to round of 16	—	1–0	3–1	~~21 Oct~~
2	(Iran) Sepahan	4	2	1	1	5	3	+2	7	Advance to round of 16	2–0	—	2–2	~~30 Sep~~
3	(Turkmenistan) Ahal	4	0	1	3	4	10	−6	1		1–4	0–1	—	~~25 Nov~~
4	(India) Mohun Bagan	0	0	0	0	0	0	0	0	Withdrew (Note: On 27 September 2025, AFC announced that Mohun Bagan SG were considered to have withdrawn from the AFC Champions League Two after they failed to travel to Iran to play their fixture against Sepahan in Isfahan, citing security concerns. Their single match played, a 1–0 defeat to Ahal, was annulled and all their remaining matches were cancelled. This was the second year in a row that Mohun Bagan had been withdrawn from the competition for refusing to fulfill a fixture in Iran. In December 2025 the AFC banned them from entering the following season's AFC competitions, meaning they will not be eligible to re-enter the Champions League until the 2027–28 season)	~~4 Nov~~	~~23 Dec~~	~~0–1~~	—

Source: ACL2
Rules for classification: Tiebreakers
Notes:

16 September 2025 Group Stage	Mohun Bagan (All India Football Federation)	Voided (0–1)	(Football Federation of Turkmenistan) Ahal	Kolkata, India
19:15 UTC+5:30	Tom Aldred (yellow card) 45+1'	Report	N. Tovakelov (yellow card) 70'; Enver Annayev 83'	Stadium: Salt Lake Stadium; Attendance: 41,003; Referee: Clifford Daypuyat (Philippines)

30 September 2025 Group Stage	Sepahan (Football Federation Islamic Republic of Iran)	Cancelled (Note: On 27 September 2025, AFC announced that Mohun Bagan SG were considered to have withdrawn from the AFC Champions League Two after they failed to appear for their fixture against Sepahan in Isfahan. Their single match was voided.)	(All India Football Federation) Mohun Bagan	Isfahan, Iran
21:30 IST		Report		Stadium: Naghsh-e-Jahan Stadium

21 October 2025 Group Stage	Al-Hussein (Jordan Football Association)	Cancelled	(All India Football Federation) Mohun Bagan	Amman, Jordan
23:45 IST		Report		Stadium: Amman International Stadium

4 November 2025 Group Stage	Mohun Bagan (All India Football Federation)	Cancelled	(Jordan Football Association) Al-Hussein	Kolkata, India
19:15 IST		Report		Stadium: Salt Lake Stadium

25 November 2025 Group Stage	Ahal (Football Federation of Turkmenistan)	Cancelled	(All India Football Federation) Mohun Bagan	Isfahan, Iran
19:15 IST		Report		Stadium: Naghsh-e-Jahan Stadium

23 December 2025 Group Stage	Mohun Bagan (All India Football Federation)	Cancelled	(Football Federation Islamic Republic of Iran) Sepahan	Kolkata, India
19:15 IST		Report		Stadium: Salt Lake Stadium

===== Group D =====
Pos	Team	Pld	W	D	L	GF	GA	GD	Pts	Qualification	NSR	ZWR	IST	GOA
1	(Saudi Arabia) Al-Nassr	6	6	0	0	22	2	+20	18	Advance to round of 16	—	5–1	5–0	4–0
2	(Iraq) Al-Zawraa	6	3	0	3	8	11	−3	9	Advance to round of 16	0–2	—	2–1	2–1
3	(Tajikistan) Istiklol	6	3	0	3	7	13	−6	9		0–4	2–1	—	2–0
4	(India) Goa	6	0	0	6	3	14	−11	0		1–2	0–2	1–2	—

Source: ACL2
Rules for classification: Tiebreakers

17 September 2025 Group Stage	Goa (All India Football Federation)	0–2	(Iraq Football Association) Zawraa	Goa, India
19:30 IST		Report	Bani Hani 44'; Al-Rashdan 90+5'	Stadium: Jawaharlal Nehru Stadium; Attendance: 8,756; Referee: Baraa Aisha (Palestine)

1 October 2025 Group Stage	Istiklol (Tajikistan Football Federation)	2–0	(All India Football Federation) Goa	Hisor, Tajikistan
19:15 IST	Soirov 46'; Dehghani 74'	Report		Stadium: Hisor Central Stadium; Attendance: 5,750; Referee: Thoriq Alkatiri (Indonesia)

22 October 2025 Group Stage	Goa (All India Football Federation)	1–2	(Saudi Arabian Football Federation) Al-Nassr	Goa, India
19:30 IST	Fernandes 41'	Report	Ângelo 10'; Camara 27'	Stadium: Jawaharlal Nehru Stadium; Attendance: 14,389; Referee: Adel Al-Naqbi (United Arab Emirates)

6 November 2025 Group Stage	Al-Nassr (Saudi Arabian Football Federation)	4–0	(All India Football Federation) Goa	Riyadh, Saudi Arabia
00:15 IST	Ghareeb 35', 53'; Maran 65'; João Félix 84'	Report		Stadium: Al-Awwal Park; Referee: Kim Hee-gon (South Korea)

26 November 2025 Group Stage	Zawraa (Iraq Football Association)	2–1	(All India Football Federation) Goa	Baghdad, Iraq
21:30 IST	Raad 38'; Abdulkareem 65'	Report	Ismail 51' (o.g.)	Stadium: Al Zawraa Stadium; Attendance: 8,322; Referee: Firdavs Norsafarov (Uzbekistan)

24 December 2025 Group Stage	Goa (All India Football Federation)	1–2	(Tajikistan Football Federation) Istiklol	Goa, India
21:30 IST	Dražić 8'	Report	Komolafe 53'; Dzhuraboev 56' (pen.)	Stadium: Jawaharlal Nehru Stadium; Attendance: 1,083; Referee: Ammar Mahfoodh (Bahrain)

== AFC club competitions (women's) ==
=== AFC Women's Champions League ===
==== Preliminary Group E ====
Pos	Team	Pld	W	D	L	GF	GA	GD	Pts	Qualification
1	(India) East Bengal	2	1	1	0	2	1	+1	4	Advance to group stage
2	(Hong Kong) Kitchee	2	0	2	0	4	4	0	2	
3	(Cambodia) Phnom Penh Crown (H)	2	0	1	1	3	4	−1	1	

Source: AFC
Rules for classification: Tiebreakers
(H) Hosts

25 August 2025	Phnom Penh (Football Federation of Cambodia)	0–1	(India) East Bengal	Phnom Penh, Cambodia
17:30 IST		Report	Ikwaput 70'	Stadium: National Sports Complex; Attendance: 786; Referee: Oh Hyeon-jeong (KOR)

31 August 2025	East Bengal (India)	1–1	(Football Association of Hong Kong, China) Kitchee	Phnom Penh, Cambodia
17:30 IST	Basfore 11'	Report	Mei 59'	Stadium: National Sports Complex

==== Main Group B ====
Pos	Team	Pld	W	D	L	GF	GA	GD	Pts	Qualification
1	(China) Wuhan Jiangda (H)	3	2	1	0	7	1	+6	7	Advance to knockout stage
2	(Uzbekistan) Nasaf	3	1	1	1	4	2	+2	4	Advance to knockout stage
3	(India) East Bengal	3	1	0	2	3	6	−3	3	
4	(Iran) Bam Khatoon	3	1	0	2	2	7	−5	3	

Source: AFC
Rules for classification: Tiebreakers
(H) Hosts

17 November 2025 MD1	Bam Khatoon (Football Federation Islamic Republic of Iran)	1–3	(India) East Bengal	Wuhan, China
16:30 IST	Hamoudi 45+8' (pen.)	Report	Hemam 4'; Ikwaput 32'; Nanziri 87'	Stadium: Hankou Cultural Sports Centre; Attendance: 268; Referee: Casey Reibelt (Australia)

20 November 2025 MD2	East Bengal (All India Football Federation)	0–2	(Chinese Football Association) Wuhan Jiangda	Wuhan, China
16:30 IST		Report	Wang Shuang 8', 17' (pen.)	Stadium: Hankou Cultural Sports Centre; Attendance: 625; Referee: Kim Yu-jeong (South Korea)

23 November 2025 MD3	East Bengal (All India Football Federation)	0–3	(Uzbekistan) Nasaf	Wuhan, China
16:30 IST		Report	Khabibullaeva 18', 90+8'; Norboeva 52'	Stadium: Hankou Cultural Sports Centre; Attendance: 354; Referee: Yoshimi Yamashita (Japan)

=== SAFF Club Women's Championship ===
==== Group stage ====
Pos	Team	Pld	W	D	L	GF	GA	GD	Pts	Qualification	(India) EAB	(Nepal) APF	(Bhutan) TRU	(Pakistan) KAC	(Bangladesh) NAS
1	(India) East Bengal (C)	4	3	1	0	13	0	+13	10	Advance to final		0–0		2–0	
2	(Nepal) APF (H)	4	2	2	0	5	0	+5	8	Advance to final			0–0	1–0	
3	(Bhutan) Transport United	4	0	3	1	1	5	−4	3		0–4				1–1
4	(Pakistan) Karachi City	4	0	2	2	0	3	−3	2				0–0		0–0
5	(Bangladesh) Nasrin	4	0	2	2	1	12	−11	2		0–7	0–4			

Source: SAFF
Legend: Blue = home team win; Yellow = draw; Red = away team win.
Rules for classification: Qualification tiebreakers
(C) Champions; (H) Hosts

===== Matches =====
8 December 2025 SAFF Women's Championship GS	Transport United (Bhutan Football Federation)	0–4	(All India Football Federation) East Bengal	Kathmandu, Nepal
14:00 UTC+5:45 (13:45 IST)		Report	Ikwaput 36', 72'; Raul 60'; Nanziri 63'	Stadium: Dasharath Rangasala; Attendance: 125; Referee: Zin Mar Oo (Myanmar)

11 December 2025 SAFF Women's Championship GS	East Bengal (All India Football Federation)	2–0	(Pakistan Football Federation) Karachi City	Kathmandu, Nepal
14:00 UTC+5:45 (13:45 IST)	Raul 5'; Nanziri 49'	Report		Stadium: Dasharath Rangasala; Attendance: 305; Referee: Anjana Rai (Nepal)

14 December 2025 SAFF Women's Championship GS	Nasrin (Bangladesh Football Federation)	0–7	(All India Football Federation) East Bengal	Kathmandu, Nepal
18:00 UTC+5:45 (17:45 IST)		Report	Ikwaput 7', 26', 45', 74', 90'; Chouhan 45+1'; Raul 73'	Stadium: Dasharath Rangasala; Attendance: 299; Referee: Keomany Phengmeuagkhoun (Laos)

17 December 2025 SAFF Women's Championship GS	East Bengal (All India Football Federation)	0–0	(All Nepal Football Association) APF	Kathmandu, Nepal
18:00 UTC+5:45 (17:45 IST)		Report		Stadium: Dasharath Rangasala; Attendance: 8,323; Referee: Yapa A. Pabasara Minisarani (Sri Lanka)

20 December 2025 SAFF Women's Championship GS	East Bengal (All India Football Federation)	3–0	(All Nepal Football Association) APF	Kathmandu, Nepal
17:00 UTC+5:45 (16:45 IST)	Ikwaput 46', 22'; Hemam 35'	Report		Stadium: Dasharath Rangasala; Attendance: 8,253; Referee: Keomany Phengmeuagkhoun (Laos)

== Men's club football ==
=== Indian Super League ===
The Indian Super League started on 14 February and ended on 21 May 2026. East Bengal won the ISL title for the 1st time.

Pos	Team	Pld	W	D	L	GF	GA	GD	Pts	Qualification
1	East Bengal (C)	13	7	5	1	30	11	+19	26	Champions and Qualification for the Champions League Two qualifying playoffs (Note: As per Article 4 of entry regulations for AFC’s club competitions, each club needs to play a minimum of 24 matches per season in the domestic top division that runs for at least eight months, to receive direct slots in AFC club competitions. Since Indian clubs will play just 13 games, the ISL winners will enter the qualifying stage of the ACL2 instead of the group stage.)
2	Mohun Bagan	13	7	5	1	23	9	+14	26	
3	Mumbai City	13	7	4	2	17	9	+8	25	
4	Bengaluru	13	6	5	2	18	12	+6	23	
5	Jamshedpur	13	6	4	3	15	10	+5	22 (Note: Head-to-head points: Jamshedpur 3, Punjab 0.)	
6	Punjab	13	6	4	3	18	12	+6	22	
7	Goa	13	5	5	3	15	11	+4	20	Qualification for the Champions League Two qualifying playoffs (Note: Goa qualified for the AFC Champions League Two qualifying playoffs as the 2025–26 AIFF Super Cup winners.)
8	Kerala Blasters	13	5	2	6	15	17	−2	17	
9	NorthEast United	13	4	4	5	16	21	−5	16	
10	Inter Kashi	13	3	4	6	11	17	−6	13	
11	Odisha	13	2	5	6	14	22	−8	11 (Note: Head-to-head points: Odisha 3, Delhi 0.)	
12	Delhi	13	2	5	6	13	17	−4	11	
13	Chennaiyin	13	2	3	8	9	21	−12	9	
14	Mohammedan (R)	13	0	3	10	7	32	−25	3	Relegation to IFL

Source: Indian Super League
Rules for classification: 1) points; 2) goal difference; 3) number of goals scored; 4) head-to-head points; 5) head-to-head goal difference; 6) head-to-head goals scored; 7) fair play ranking; 8) drawing of lots.
(Note: Head-to-head record is used only after all the matches between the teams in question have been played).
(C) Champions; (R) Relegated

=== Indian Football League ===
The Indian Football League started on 27 February and ended on 23 May 2026. Diamond Harbour won the title for the 1st time.

First stage

This phase starts from 27 February and ends on 19 April 2026.

Pos	Team	Pld	W	D	L	GF	GA	GD	Pts	Qualification
1	Diamond Harbour	9	7	1	1	22	12	+10	22	Promotion round
2	Shillong Lajong	9	5	2	2	16	9	+7	17 (Note: Tied on head-to-head result and head-to-head goal difference. Total goal difference: Shillong Lajong +7, Rajasthan United +3.)	Promotion round
3	Rajasthan United	9	5	2	2	13	10	+3	17	Promotion round
4	Sreenidi Deccan	9	4	3	2	10	8	+2	15	Promotion round
5	Chanmari	9	3	2	4	14	15	−1	11	Promotion round
6	Dempo	9	2	3	4	14	14	0	9 (Note: Head-to-head result: Dempo 3–0 Aizawl.)	Promotion round
7	Aizawl	9	2	3	4	13	22	−9	9	Relegation round
8	Real Kashmir	9	2	2	5	15	14	+1	8 (Note: Head-to-head result: Real Kashmir 6–2 Gokulam Kerala.)	Relegation round
9	Gokulam Kerala	9	2	2	5	11	18	−7	8	Relegation round
10	Namdhari	9	1	4	4	12	18	−6	7	Relegation round

Source: IFL
Rules for classification: 1) Points; 2) Head-to-head points; 3) Head-to-head goal difference; 4) Total goal difference; 5) Total number of goals scored; 6) drawing of lots
(Note: Head-to-head record is used only after all the matches between the teams in question have been played)
Notes:

Promotion Round

This phase starts from 24 April and ends on 23 May 2026.

Pos	Team	Pld	W	D	L	GF	GA	GD	Pts	Promotion
1	Diamond Harbour (C, P)	14	9	2	3	31	20	+11	29	Promotion to ISL
2	Shillong Lajong	14	8	4	2	28	12	+16	28	
3	Sreenidi Deccan	14	7	5	2	18	13	+5	26	
4	Rajasthan United	14	5	3	6	20	24	−4	18	
5	Chanmari	14	4	3	7	19	25	−6	15	
6	Dempo	14	3	6	5	17	18	−1	15	

Source: IFL
Rules for classification: 1) Points; 2) Head-to-head points; 3) Head-to-head goal difference; 4) Total goal difference; 5) Total number of goals scored; 6) drawing of lots
(Note: Head-to-head record is used only after all the matches between the teams in question have been played)
(C) Champions; (P) Promoted

Relegation Round

This phase starts from 29 April and ends on 12 May 2026.

Pos	Team	Pld	W	D	L	GF	GA	GD	Pts	Relegation
1	Real Kashmir	12	4	2	6	20	18	+2	14	
2	Aizawl	12	3	4	5	18	27	−9	13	
3	Gokulam Kerala	12	3	3	6	14	23	−9	12	
4	Namdhari (R)	12	2	4	6	16	21	−5	10	Relegation to IL2

Source: IFL
Rules for classification: 1) Points; 2) Head-to-head points; 3) Head-to-head goal difference; 4) Total goal difference; 5) Total number of goals scored; 6) drawing of lots
(Note: Head-to-head record is used only after all the matches between the teams in question have been played)
(R) Relegated

=== I-League 2 ===
The Indian Football League 2 started on 27 March and ended on 15 May 2026. Delhi won the title for the 1st time.

Pos	Team	Pld	W	D	L	GF	GA	GD	Pts	Promotion or relegation
1	Delhi (C, P)	8	5	2	1	20	10	+10	17	Promotion to IFL
2	Bengaluru United (P)	8	4	3	1	12	6	+6	15 (Note: Tied on head-to-head result and head-to-head goal difference. Total goal difference: Bengaluru United +6, United +2.)	Promotion to IFL
3	United	8	4	3	1	7	5	+2	15	
4	Sporting Bengaluru	8	3	2	3	13	15	−2	11	
5	Morning Star	8	2	4	2	10	7	+3	10	
6	Sudeva Delhi	8	3	1	4	6	7	−1	10	
7	Sporting Goa	8	3	1	4	8	11	−3	10	
8	MYJ–GMSC	8	1	2	5	8	19	−11	5 (Note: Head-to-head result: MYJ-GMSC 2–1 NEROCA.)	
9	NEROCA (R)	8	1	2	5	11	15	−4	5	Relegation to IL3
10	SA Tirur (R)	0	0	0	0	0	0	0	0	Withdrew

Source: IFL AIFF
Rules for classification: 1) points; 2) Head-to-head result; 3) goal difference; 4) goals scored; 5) fair play ranking; 6) drawing of lots.
(C) Champions; (P) Promoted; (R) Relegated

=== I-League 3 ===
The I-League 3 started on 27 April and ended on 24 May 2026. Banaras Baghpat won the title for the 1st time.

Group stage

This phase starts from 27 April and ends on 7 May 2026.

Group A
Pos	Team	Pld	Pts
1	Sunrise	4	9
2	Raengdai (H)	4	7
3	Mawlai	4	5
4	ARA FC	4	4
5	Sikkim Brotherhood	4	3

Source: IFL
(H) Hosts

Group C
Pos	Team	Pld	Pts
1	KLASA	3	9
2	Chhaygaon	3	6
3	Diamond Rock (H)	3	3
4	Godavari Legends	3	0
5	Kuppuraj	0	0

Source: IFL
(H) Hosts

Group B
Pos	Team	Pld	Pts
1	TRAU (H)	4	10
2	Samaleswari	4	6
3	Zinc FA	4	5
4	CD Salgaocar	4	4
5	Mumbay	4	2

Source: IFL
(H) Hosts

Group D
Pos	Team	Pld	Pts
1	Banaras Baghpat	4	10
2	Agniputhra (H)	4	7
3	New Friends	4	6
4	Royal Rangers	4	6
5	Techtro Swades	4	0

Source: IFL
(H) Hosts

Final round

This phase starts from 16 May and ends on 24 May 2026.

Super Six
Pos	Team	Pld	Pts
1	Banaras Baghpat (C, P)	5	10
2	Raengdai (P, H)	5	10
3	Sunrise	5	9
4	KLASA (H)	5	6
5	TRAU (H)	5	3
6	Chhaygaon	5	1

Source: IFL
(C) Champions;
(H) Hosts;
(P) Promoted

=== State football leagues ===
Zone	State	League	Teams	League dates	Duration (months)	Champions	Runners-up	I-League 3 eligibility
North	Delhi	2025–26 Delhi Premier League	14	26 December 2025–31 May 2026	5	Garhwal Heroes	Royal Rangers	Garhwal Heroes
North	Punjab	2025–26 Punjab State Super League	10	1 August–28 December 2025	5	Punjab FC	Sher-e-Punjab	Sher-e-Punjab
North	Uttarakhand	2025-26 Uttarakhand State Football League	8	10 May–6 June 2026	1	Corbett FC	Amenity FA	Corbett FC
North	Rajasthan	2025–26 R-League A Division	7	20 March–30 April 2026	1	Zinc FA	Jaipur City	Zinc FA
Northeast
Northeast	Assam	2025 Assam State Premier League						
Northeast	Arunachal Pradesh	2025 Arunachal League	10	4 October–8 November 2025	1	Capital Complex	Subansiri United	Capital Complex
Northeast	Manipur	2025–26 Manipur State League	24	7 December 2025–5 April 2026	4	Eastern Sporting Union	NFMA Salam	Eastern Sporting Union
Northeast	Manipur	2025–26 Manipur Premier League	15	5 October 2025–9 January 2026	3	Southern Sporting Union	Anouba Imagi Mangal	Southern Sporting Union
Northeast	Mizoram	2025 Mizoram Premier League	8	25 August–1 November 2025	2.5	Chanmari	Aizawl	MLS FC
Northeast	Sikkim	2026 Sikkim Premier League	8	5 April–18 May 2026	1.5	Siniolchu FC	Singling SC	Siniolchu
Northeast	Nagaland	2026 Nagaland League						
Northeast	Meghalaya	2026 Meghalaya State League	33	15 April–5 June 2026	1.5	Nongkseh SCC	Langsning	Nongkseh SCC
East
East	Odisha	2025 FAO League						
East	West Bengal (Kolkata)	2025 CFL Premier Division	26	25 June–22 September 2025	3	East Bengal	United SC	Suruchi Sangha
East	Chhattisgarh	2025 Chhattisgarh Football League						
West	Goa	2025–26 Goa Professional League	15	18 September 2025–30 April 2026	7	SC De Goa	Dempo SC	Clube de Salgaocar
West	Gujarat	2025–26 Gujarat Championship	10	8 Nov 2025–15 Feb 2026	3.5	Charutkar Vidhya Mandal	Reserve Bank of India	Charutkar Vidhya Mandal
West	Madhya Pradesh	2025–26 Madhya Pradesh Premier League	8	27 September 2025–18 January 2026	4	Lakecity FC	Build Up Sport	Lakecity FC
West	Maharashtra	2025–26 Mumbai Premier League	20	1 December 2025–22 May 2026	6	Maharashtra Oranje	MYJ-GMSC	—N/a
West	Maharashtra	2026 Maharashtra Football League	10	7 March–20 April 2026	1	Game of Goals	India On Track	Game of Goals
South	Karnataka (Bengaluru)	2025 Bangalore Super Division	10	28 July–24 August 2025	1	Kickstart	Misaka	Kickstart
South	Andhra Pradesh	2026 AP Super Cup	8	28 January–4 February 2026	8 days	Godavari FC	Coramandal FC	Godavari
South	Telangana	2025-26 Telangana A Division Rahim League	14	7 June–7 October 2025	4	Sreenidi Deccan B	AGORC	
South	Kerala	2026 Kerala Premier League	14	8 March 2026–31 May 2026	3	Gokulam Kerala B	Calicut	Calicut

== Cup competitions (men's) ==
=== Durand Cup ===
The Durand Cup started on 23 July and ended on 23 August 2025. NorthEast United won the title for the second year in a row.

Group stage

This phase starts from 23 July and ends on 12 August 2025.

Group A
Pos	Team	Pld	Pts
1	East Bengal (H)	3	9
2	Namdhari	3	6
3	Indian Air Force	3	1
4	South United	3	1

Source: DFTS
(H) Hosts

Group B
Pos	Team	Pld	Pts
1	Mohun Bagan (H)	3	9
2	Diamond Harbour	3	6
3	Mohammedan (H)	3	3
4	Border Security Force	3	0

Source: DFTS
(H) Hosts

Group C
Pos	Team	Pld	Pts
1	Jamshedpur (H)	3	9
2	Indian Army	3	6
3	(Nepal) Tribhuvan Army	3	1
4	1 Ladakh	3	1

Source: DFTS
(H) Hosts

Group D
Pos	Team	Pld	Pts
1	Bodoland (H)	3	9
2	Punjab	3	4
3	ITB Police	3	4
4	Karbi Anglong Morning Star	3	0

Source: DFTS
(H) Hosts

Group E
Pos	Team	Pld	Pts
1	NorthEast United	3	7
2	Shillong Lajong (H)	3	6
3	(Malaysia) Armed Forces	3	3
4	Rangdajied United (H)	3	1

Source: DFTS
(H) Hosts

Group F
Pos	Team	Pld	Pts
1	Indian Navy	3	7
2	Real Kashmir	3	6
3	NEROCA (H)	3	2
4	TRAU (H)	3	1

Source: DFTS
(H) Hosts

Ranking of second-placed teams

Pos	Team	Pld	Pts
1	Shillong Lajong	3	6
2	Diamond Harbour	3	6
3	Namdhari	3	6
4	Real Kashmir	3	6
5	Indian Army	3	6
6	Punjab	3	4

Source: DFTS

Bracket

This phase starts from 16 August and the competition concluded with the final match on 23 August 2025.

Quarter-finals
16 Aug – Shillong
Shillong Lajong	2
Indian Navy	1
16 Aug – Kokrajhar
Bodoland	0
NorthEast United	4
17 Aug – Jamshedpur
Jamshedpur	0
Diamond Harbour	2
17 Aug – Kolkata
East Bengal	2
Mohun Bagan	1

Semi-finals
19 Aug – Shillong
Shillong Lajong	0
NorthEast United	1
20 Aug – Kolkata
Diamond Harbour	2
East Bengal	1

Final
23 Aug – Kolkata
NorthEast United	6
Diamond Harbour	1

Final

23 August 2025
17:30 IST

NorthEast United	6–1	Diamond Harbour
Akhtar 30'; Gogoi 45+1'; Ngasepam 50'; Samperio 81'; Rodríguez 85'; Ajaraie 90+3' (pen.)	Report; PDF	Majcen 68'

Vivekananda Yuba Bharati Krirangan, Kolkata, West Bengal
Attendance: 16,920

=== IFA Shield ===
The Durand Cup started on 8 October and ended on 18 October 2025. Mohun Bagan won the title for the 21st time.

Group stage

This phase started from 18 October and ended on 15 October 2025.

Group A
Pos	Team	Pld	Pts
1	East Bengal	2	6
2	Namdhari	2	3
3	Sreenidi Deccan	2	0

Source: IFA

Group B
Pos	Team	Pld	Pts
1	Mohun Bagan	2	6
2	United SC	2	3
3	Gokulam Kerala	2	0

Source: IFA

Final

18 October 2025
18:00 IST

Mohun Bagan	1–1 (a.e.t.)	East Bengal
Cummings (penalty missed) 34'; Apuia 45+3'	AIFF; I-League; PDF Report	Hamid 36'
Penalties
(penalty scored) Robson; (penalty scored) Manvir; (penalty scored) Liston; (penalty scored) Petratos; (penalty scored) Mehtab	5–4	(penalty scored) Miguel; (penalty scored) Sibille; (penalty scored) Mahesh; (penalty missed) Jay; (penalty scored) Ibusuki

Vivekananda Yuba Bharati Krirangan, Kolkata
Attendance: 50,236
Referee: Venkatesh Ramachadran
Man of the Match: Naorem Mahesh (East Bengal)

=== Super Cup ===
The Super Cup started on 25 October and ended on 7 December 2025. FC Goa won the title for the 3rd time.

Group stage

This phase started from 25 October and ended on 6 November 2025.

Group A
Pos	Team	Pld	Pts
1	East Bengal	3	5
2	Mohun Bagan	3	5
3	Dempo (H)	3	3
4	Chennaiyin	3	1

Source: AIFF
(H) Hosts

Group C
Pos	Team	Pld	Pts
1	Punjab	3	7
2	Bengaluru	3	7
3	Gokulam Kerala	3	3
4	Mohammedan	3	0

Source: AIFF

Group B
Pos	Team	Pld	Pts
1	Goa (H)	3	6
2	NorthEast United	3	5
3	Jamshedpur	3	4
4	Inter Kashi	3	1

Source: AIFF
(H) Hosts

Group D
Pos	Team	Pld	Pts
1	Mumbai City	3	6
2	Kerala Blasters	3	6
3	Rajasthan United	3	4
4	Delhi	3	1

Source: AIFF

Knockout stage

This phase starts from 4 December and the competition concluded with the final match on 7 December 2025.

Semifinals
A1	East Bengal	3
C1	Punjab	1
B1	Goa	2
D1	Mumbai City	1

Final
SF1	East Bengal	0 (5)
SF2	Goa (p)	0 (6)

Final

7 December 2025
19:30 IST
Final

East Bengal	0–0 (a.e.t.)	Goa
	I-League; PDF Report
Penalties
Sibille (penalty scored); Saúl (penalty scored); Miguel (penalty scored); Rashid (penalty missed); A. Ali (penalty scored); Ahadad (penalty scored); PV Vishnu (penalty missed)	5–6	(penalty missed) Borja; (penalty scored) Siverio; (penalty scored) Dejan; (penalty scored) Nemil; (penalty scored) Timor; (penalty scored) Udanta; (penalty scored) Tavora

Fatorda Stadium, Fatorda
Attendance: 9,400
Referee: Harish Kundu
Man of the Match: Hrithik Tiwari (Goa)

== Women's club football ==
=== Indian Women's League ===
Pos	Team	Pld	W	D	L	GF	GA	GD	Pts	Qualification or relegation
1	East Bengal (C)	14	13	0	1	47	5	+42	39	Qualification for AFC Champions League
2	Sethu	14	7	4	3	26	14	+12	25	
3	Kickstart	14	6	3	5	17	21	−4	21	
4	Nita	14	5	5	4	26	23	+3	20	
5	Gokulam Kerala	14	4	6	4	16	16	0	18	
6	Garhwal United	14	4	3	7	16	28	−12	15	
7	Sribhumi (R)	14	3	4	7	24	26	−2	13	Relegation to Indian Women's League 2
8	Sesa (R)	14	0	3	11	9	48	−39	3	Relegation to Indian Women's League 2

Source: IFL
Rules for classification: 1) points; 2) head-to-head points; 3) head-to-head goal difference; 4) goal difference; 5) number of goals scored; 6)drawing of lots
(C) Champions; (R) Relegated

=== Indian Women's League 2 ===
Final round

Pos	Team	Pld	W	D	L	GF	GA	GD	Pts	Promotion
1	HOPS (C, P)	5	5	0	0	8	0	+8	15	Promotion to Indian Women's League
2	Juba Sangha (P)	5	4	0	1	15	5	+10	12	Promotion to Indian Women's League
3	Kemp (H)	5	3	0	2	9	6	+3	9	
4	Krida Prabodhini	5	2	0	3	9	12	−3	6	
5	Mumbai Knights	5	1	0	4	3	9	−6	3	
6	Suruchi Sangha	5	0	0	5	3	15	−12	0	

Source: IFL
Rules for classification: 1) points; 2) head-to-head points; 3) head-to-head goal difference; 4) goal difference; 5) number of goals scored; 6) drawing of lots
(C) Champions; (H) Hosts; (P) Promoted

== Nationals ==
=== Santosh Trophy ===
The Santosh Trophy started on 15 December 2025 and ended on 8 February 2026.

First round

This phase starts from 15 December 2025 and ends on 26 December 2025.

Group A
Pos	Team	Pld	Pts
1	Punjab (H)	3	9
2	Jammu and Kashmir	3	6
3	Ladakh	3	3
4	Himachal Pradesh	3	0

Source: AIFF
(H) Hosts

Group B
Pos	Team	Pld	Pts
1	Uttarakhand	3	9
2	Haryana	3	4
3	Chandigarh	3	3
4	Uttar Pradesh (H)	3	1

Source: AIFF
(H) Hosts

Group C
Pos	Team	Pld	Pts
1	Railways	3	7
2	Delhi (H)	3	7
3	Jharkhand	3	3
4	Bihar	3	0

Source: AIFF
(H) Hosts

Group D
Pos	Team	Pld	Pts
1	Nagaland	3	7
2	Manipur	3	6
3	Mizoram	3	3
4	Tripura (H)	3	1

Source: AIFF
(H) Hosts

Group E
Pos	Team	Pld	Pts
1	Meghalaya (H)	2	3
2	Sikkim	2	3
3	Arunachal Pradesh	2	3

Source: AIFF
(H) Hosts

Group F
Pos	Team	Pld	Pts
1	Odisha	3	9
2	Telangana	3	6
3	Chhattisgarh (H)	3	3
4	Madhya Pradesh	3	0

Source: AIFF
(H) Hosts

Group G
Pos	Team	Pld	Pts
1	Tamil Nadu	3	9
2	Pondicherry	3	6
3	Andhra Pradesh (H)	3	3
4	Andaman & Nicobar	3	0

Source: AIFF
(H) Hosts

Group H
Pos	Team	Pld	Pts
1	Services	3	9
2	Goa (H)	3	4
3	Karnataka	3	3
4	Lakshadweep	3	1

Source: AIFF
(H) Hosts

Group I
Pos	Team	Pld	Pts
1	Rajasthan (H)	3	7
2	Gujarat	3	7
3	Maharashtra	3	3
4	DNHDD	3	0

Source: AIFF
(H) Hosts

Final round

This phase starts from 21 January 2025 and ends on 1 February 2026.

Group A
Pos	Team	Pld	Pts
1	West Bengal	5	11
2	Tamil Nadu	5	10
3	Rajasthan	5	7
4	Assam (H)	5	6
5	Uttarakhand	5	4
6	Nagaland	5	2

Source: AIFF
(H) Hosts

Group B
Pos	Team	Pld	Pts
1	Kerala	5	10
2	Railways	5	7
3	Punjab	5	7
4	Services	5	6
5	Meghalaya	5	6
6	Odisha	5	2

Source: AIFF

Bracket

Quarter-finals
3 February – Dhakuakhana
West Bengal	0 (2)
Services (p)	0 (3)
3 February – Dhakuakhana
Railways	2
Rajasthan	0
3 February – Dhemaji
Kerala	3
Assam	0
3 February – Dhemaji
Tamil Nadu	1 (1)
Punjab (p)	1 (4)

Semi-finals
5 February – Dhemaji
Services	2
Railways	0
5 February – Dhakuakhana
Kerala	4
Punjab	0

Final
8 February – Dhakuakhana
Services (a.e.t.)	1
Kerala	0

This phase starts from 3 February and the competition concluded with the final match on 8 February 2025.

Final

8 February 2026
13:00 IST

Kerala	0–1 (a.e.t.)	Services
	Report	Abhishek Pawar 109'

Dhakuakhana Football Stadium, Dhakuakhana, Assam
Attendance: 4,500
Referee: Jehrul Islam
Man of the Match: Abhishek Pawar (Services)

=== Rajmata Jijabai Trophy ===
The Rajmata Jijabai Trophy started on 4 September 2025 and ended on 15 October 2025.

First round

This phase starts from 4 September 2025 and ends on 16 September 2025.

Group A
Pos	Team	Pld	Pts
1	Punjab (H)	3	9
2	Himachal Pradesh	3	4
3	Ladakh	3	4
4	Jammu & Kashmir	3	0

Source: AIFF
(H) Hosts

Group B
Pos	Team	Pld	Pts
1	Haryana	2	6
2	Delhi	2	3
3	Uttarakhand (H)	2	0

Source: AIFF
(H) Hosts

Group C
Pos	Team	Pld	Pts
1	Uttar Pradesh	3	9
2	Jharkhand	3	6
3	Bihar	3	3
4	Rajasthan	3	0

Source: AIFF

Group D
Pos	Team	Pld	Pts
1	West Bengal (H)	3	9
2	Sikkim	3	6
3	Railways	3	3
4	Meghalaya	3	0

Source: AIFF
(H) Hosts

Group E
Pos	Team	Pld	Pts
1	Assam (H)	3	9
2	Arunachal Pradesh	3	4
3	Mizoram	3	4
4	Tripura	3	0

Source: AIFF
(H) Hosts

Group F
Pos	Team	Pld	Pts
1	Chhattisgarh	3	7
2	Karnataka	3	7
3	Telangana	3	3
4	Andhra Pradesh	3	0

Source: AIFF

Group G
Pos	Team	Pld	Pts
1	Tamil Nadu	3	9
2	Kerala (H)	3	6
3	Pondicherry	3	3
4	Andaman & Nicobar	3	0

Source: AIFF
(H) Hosts

Group H
Pos	Team	Pld	Pts
1	Goa	3	9
2	Gujarat (H)	3	6
3	Maharashtra	3	3
4	Madhya Pradesh	3	0

Source: AIFF
(H) Hosts

Final round

This phase starts from 1 October 2025 and ends on 10 October 2025.

Group A
Pos	Team	Pld	Pts
1	West Bengal	4	10
2	Tamil Nadu	4	7
3	Odisha	4	7
4	Chhattisgarh (H)	4	3
5	Goa	4	1

Source: AIFF
(H) Hosts

Group B
Pos	Team	Pld	Pts
1	Manipur	4	12
2	Uttar Pradesh	4	9
3	Assam	4	6
4	Haryana	4	3
5	Punjab	4	0

Source: AIFF

Bracket

This phase starts from 13 October and the competition concluded with the final match on 15 October 2025.

Semi-finals
West Bengal	2
Uttar Pradesh	1
Manipur	4
Tamil Nadu	0

Final
West Bengal	0
Manipur	1

Final

15 October 2025
15:00 IST

West Bengal	0–1	Manipur
	Report	Lynda 90+3'

Ramakrishna Mission Sports Complex, Narayanpur, Chhattisgarh
Attendance: 1,000
Referee: Pooja S
Man of the Match: Adrija Sarkhel (West Bengal)

== See also ==
- Football in India
- 2025 in Indian sports
- 2026 in Indian sports
- 2025–26 in Bangladeshi football
