= 2024–25 Maharashtra State Senior Men's Football League =

1st season of the Maharashtra State Senior Men's Football League

Maharashtra State Senior Men's Football League
- Season: 2024–25
- Dates: 10 May – 14 June 2025
- Champions: Magic Made Soccer
- Promoted: Magic Made Soccer
- Matches: 56
- Goals: 270 (4.82 per match)
- Highest scoring: Ratnagiri Pioneers 0-15 MYJ–GMSC

The 2024–25 Maharashtra State Senior Men's Football League (MSSMFL) was the inaugural season of the top-tier state-level football league in the Indian state of Maharashtra, representing a new fifth tier of the Indian football league system.

== Venues ==
The season started at Sinhgad Sports Complex in Lonavala. Hotfut Bavdhan and NMSA Vashi were added in June as the new venues.

== Format ==
The league will follow a double round-robin format with 56 matches, offering a platform for football clubs from Maharashtra to enter I-League 3.

== Clubs ==
Location of MSSMFL teams

Clubs	City
Maharashtra Oranje	Mumbai
MYJ–GM	Mumbai
Navi Mumbai SA	Thane
AIYFA Skyhawks	Pune
Snigmay Pune	Pune
Milan SB Foundation	Raigad
Ratnagiri Pioneers	Ratnagiri
Magic Made Soccer	Solapur

== League table ==
Pos	Team	Pld	W	D	L	GF	GA	GD	Pts	Qualification
1	Magic Made Soccer	14	11	3	0	54	4	+50	36	Champions
2	MYJ–GMSC^{IL2}	14	10	2	2	48	6	+42	32	
3	Maharashtra Oranje	14	9	2	3	54	9	+45	29	
4	Navi Mumbai SA	14	6	2	6	34	25	+9	20	
5	AIYFA Skyhawks	14	5	4	5	35	19	+16	19	
6	Snigmay Pune	14	5	3	6	36	32	+4	18	
7	Milan SB Foundation	14	0	2	12	5	67	−62	2	
8	Ratnagiri Pioneers	14	0	2	12	4	108	−104	2	

Source: The Away End Football Counter
Rules for classification: 1) points; 2) goal difference; 3) number of goals scored

=== Fixtures ===
1st leg / 2nd leg	MMS	MYJ	OFC	SKY	SNI	NAV	MIL	RAT
Magic Made Soccer	—	0–0	2–2	1–0	1–0	1–0	5–0	8–0
MYJ–GMSC	0–1	—	1–0	2–0	2–1	3–0	9–1	9–0
Maharashtra Oranje	1–1	2–0	—	0–1	0–1	2–0	11–0	9–1
AIYFA Skyhawks	0–5	1–1	0–2	—	1–1	2–2	8–0	8–0
Snigmay Pune	0–5	0–1	2–6	2–2	—	2–6	2–0	6–1
Navi Mumbai SA	1–5	0–2	0–1	3–2	4–4	—	3–0	8–1
Milan SB Foundation	0–6	0–3	0–7	0–4	3–5	0–3	—	1–1
Ratnagiri Pioneers	0–13	0–15	0–11	0–6	0–10	0–4	0–0	—

Source: The Away End
Legend: Blue = left column team win; Yellow = draw; Red = top row team win.

== See also ==
- 2024–25 Mumbai Premier League
- 2024–25 Mumbai Super League
- 2024–25 in Indian football
- 2024–25 I-League 3
- 2024–25 Indian State Leagues
