= Mumbay FC =

Indian association football club based in Mumbai

Mumbay
- Full name: Mumbay Football Club
- Short name: MFC
- Founded: July 17, 2024; 2 years ago
- Ground: Cooperage Ground; Neville D'Souza Ground
- Capacity: 5,000
- Owner: Ali Ahmed
- Head coach: Ajay Gopal Acharya
- League: Maharashtra State Senior Men's Football League; Mumbai Premier League (reserves)
Home colours	Away colours	Third colours

Mumbay FC is an Indian professional football club based in Mumbai, Maharashtra. The club competes in the I-League 3, the fourth tier of Indian football, and the Maharashtra State Senior Men's Football League. The club name is a portmanteau of Mumbai and Bombay.

== History ==
Mumbay FC was officially launched on 17 July 2024 by entrepreneur Ali Ahmed. At the launch, Mumbay FC sported colours and a crest similar to the defunct Mumbai FC. Zoheb Khan was named the club director, Asim Hassan the head coach, and Joe Paul Bence as the player-assistant.

Mumbay FC were granted entry to the 2024–25 Mumbai Premier League, replacing Protrack from the previous season. Tiger Shroff was roped in as an unofficial marquee player to promote the new club. He even made his debut as a professional footballer, and played a game. They finished the tournament in 4th place. During the tournament they also took on Mumbai City Reserves and lost the game by 3–2. Later in the year, Mumbay FC formed a partnership with Magic Made Soccer Solapur which entered the 2024–25 Maharashtra State Senior Men's Football League. MMS Solapur ended up winning the tournament unbeaten and were declared the champions of Maharashtra. Since MMS Solapur was its sister club, Mumbay FC was granted a slot in the 2025–26 I-League 3.

After a disappointing 2025–26 season in the I-League 3, Maharashtra League and Mumbai Premier League, the club is set to participate in the 2026 Durand Cup, marking a rapid rise for the Mumbai-based club.

== Personnel ==
=== Corporate ===
Position	Name
Chairman	Ali Ahmed
President	Zoheb Khan
