= 2023–24 Mumbai Super League =

Mumbai Super League

Mumbai Super League
- Season: 2023–24
- Dates: 23 August 2023 – 18 March 2024
- Champions: Mumbai City U19
- Promoted: Mumbai City U19; India on Track; Bombay Gymkhana
- Matches played: 226
- Goals scored: 920 (4.07 per match)
- All statistics correct as of 7 April 2024.

The 2023–24 Mumbai Super League represented the second-tier football league of the Mumbai Football League, run by the Mumbai Football Association. It is the sixth tier of the Indian football league system. The two teams at the end of the Super Six stage are promoted to the Mumbai Premier League.

Mumbai City U19 were crowned champions and returned to the Mumbai top division for the first time since they were banished during the 2021–22 MFA Elite Division.

== Venue and teams ==
All matches were played at Neville D'Souza Ground in Bandra. Thirty-seven teams participated in the 2023–24 edition of the Mumbai Super League.

== League tables ==
=== Group A ===
| Pos | Team | Pld | W | D | L | GF | GA | GD | Pts | Qualification |
|---|---|---|---|---|---|---|---|---|---|---|
| 1 | Bombay Gymkhana | 11 | 8 | 3 | 0 | 44 | 13 | +31 | 27 | Qualification for Super Six |
| 2 | Om Saidham | 11 | 8 | 2 | 1 | 56 | 11 | +45 | 26 | Qualification for Super Six |
| 3 | Mumbai Ultras | 11 | 8 | 1 | 2 | 46 | 12 | +34 | 25 | |
| 4 | Soccer Saga | 11 | 6 | 3 | 2 | 21 | 14 | +7 | 21 | |
| 5 | Rhema FC | 11 | 6 | 3 | 2 | 17 | 10 | +7 | 21 | |
| 6 | Spartans | 11 | 4 | 2 | 5 | 41 | 21 | +20 | 14 | |
| 7 | Mumbai Kenkre U19 | 11 | 4 | 2 | 5 | 19 | 16 | +3 | 14 | |
| 8 | Bombay YMCA | 11 | 4 | 1 | 6 | 22 | 37 | −15 | 13 | |
| 9 | SG5 Bharat | 11 | 2 | 4 | 5 | 15 | 28 | −13 | 10 | |
| 10 | India Culture League | 11 | 2 | 1 | 8 | 12 | 60 | −48 | 7 | |
| 11 | Ratnam | 11 | 2 | 0 | 9 | 10 | 35 | −25 | 6 | |
| 12 | Colaba FC | 11 | 1 | 0 | 10 | 4 | 50 | −46 | 3 | |

Source: MSL Group A Standings Football Counter
Rules for classification: 1) points; 2) head-to-head points 3) head-to-head goal difference; 4) head-to-head goals scored 5) goal difference 6) goals scored

=== Group B ===
| Pos | Team | Pld | W | D | L | GF | GA | GD | Pts | Qualification |
|---|---|---|---|---|---|---|---|---|---|---|
| 1 | Somaiya FC | 11 | 8 | 3 | 0 | 39 | 15 | +24 | 27 | Qualification for Super Six |
| 2 | Maharashtra Oranje U23 | 11 | 7 | 3 | 1 | 26 | 8 | +18 | 24 | Qualification for Super Six |
| 3 | Iron Born | 11 | 7 | 3 | 1 | 30 | 9 | +21 | 24 | |
| 4 | KSA Juniors | 11 | 7 | 2 | 2 | 28 | 12 | +16 | 23 | |
| 5 | India Rush | 11 | 4 | 4 | 3 | 22 | 14 | +8 | 16 | |
| 6 | Kopana | 11 | 3 | 6 | 2 | 19 | 16 | +3 | 15 | |
| 7 | Salsette | 11 | 4 | 1 | 6 | 18 | 17 | +1 | 13 | |
| 8 | Young Boys | 11 | 3 | 4 | 4 | 12 | 13 | −1 | 13 | |
| 9 | Mumbai Marines | 11 | 3 | 3 | 5 | 14 | 17 | −3 | 12 | |
| 10 | CFCI | 11 | 2 | 3 | 6 | 21 | 33 | −12 | 9 | |
| 11 | ICL Youngstars | 11 | 2 | 0 | 9 | 7 | 41 | −34 | 6 | |
| 12 | Millat FC B | 11 | 0 | 0 | 11 | 7 | 48 | −41 | 0 | |

Source: MSL Group B Standings Football Counter
Rules for classification: 1) points; 2) head-to-head points 3) head-to-head goal difference; 4) head-to-head goals scored 5) goal difference 6) goals scored

=== Group C ===
| Pos | Team | Pld | W | D | L | GF | GA | GD | Pts | Qualification |
|---|---|---|---|---|---|---|---|---|---|---|
| 1 | Mumbai City U19 | 12 | 9 | 3 | 0 | 43 | 3 | +40 | 30 | Qualification for Super Six |
| 2 | India On Track FC | 12 | 9 | 3 | 0 | 36 | 3 | +33 | 30 | Qualification for Super Six |
| 3 | Tarun Sporting | 12 | 8 | 3 | 1 | 41 | 14 | +27 | 27 | |
| 4 | Mumbai Soccer Prodigies | 12 | 6 | 2 | 4 | 20 | 11 | +9 | 20 | |
| 5 | Mumbai Strikers | 12 | 6 | 1 | 5 | 29 | 18 | +11 | 19 | |
| 6 | Charkop FC | 12 | 6 | 1 | 5 | 19 | 15 | +4 | 19 | |
| 7 | West Zone United | 12 | 5 | 3 | 4 | 16 | 23 | −7 | 18 | |
| 8 | United Villagers | 12 | 5 | 1 | 6 | 35 | 25 | +10 | 16 | |
| 9 | Young Guns Bandra | 12 | 5 | 1 | 6 | 19 | 30 | −11 | 16 | |
| 10 | Soccer XI | 12 | 4 | 3 | 5 | 17 | 19 | −2 | 15 | |
| 11 | Football School of India | 12 | 1 | 1 | 10 | 11 | 37 | −26 | 4 | |
| 12 | ROQS FC | 12 | 1 | 1 | 10 | 11 | 48 | −37 | 4 | |
| 13 | Skorost United | 12 | 1 | 0 | 11 | 7 | 61 | −54 | 3 | |

Source: MSL Group C Standings Football Counter
Rules for classification: 1) points; 2) head-to-head points 3) head-to-head goal difference; 4) head-to-head goals scored 5) goal difference 6) goals scored

== Super Six ==
| Pos | Team | Pld | W | D | L | GF | GA | GD | Pts | Qualification |
|---|---|---|---|---|---|---|---|---|---|---|
| 1 | Mumbai City U19 (C) | 5 | 4 | 1 | 0 | 19 | 2 | +17 | 13 | Promotion to Mumbai Premier League |
| 2 | India On Track FC | 5 | 3 | 2 | 0 | 10 | 5 | +5 | 11 | Promotion to Mumbai Premier League |
| 3 | Bombay Gymkhana | 5 | 2 | 2 | 1 | 11 | 12 | −1 | 8 | Promotion to Mumbai Premier League |
| 4 | Maharashtra Oranje U23 | 5 | 2 | 1 | 2 | 10 | 10 | 0 | 7 | |
| 5 | Somaiya FC | 5 | 0 | 1 | 4 | 7 | 15 | −8 | 1 | |
| 6 | Om Saidham | 5 | 0 | 1 | 4 | 7 | 20 | −13 | 1 | |

Source: MSL Super Six Standings Football Counter
Rules for classification: 1) points; 2) head-to-head points 3) head-to-head goal difference; 4) head-to-head goals scored 5) goal difference 6) goals scored
(C) Champions

== See also ==
- 2023–24 Mumbai Premier League
- 2023–24 I-League 3
- 2023–24 Indian State Leagues
- 2023–24 in Indian football
