= 2024–25 Mumbai Super League =

Mumbai Super League

Mumbai Super League
- Season: 2024–25
- Dates: 17 August 2024 – 14 February 2025
- Champions: Mumbai Soccer Prodigies
- Promoted: Mumbai Soccer Prodigies; Waves FC; Mumbai Ultras
- Matches played: 247
- Goals scored: 1,101 (4.46 per match)
- Best goalkeeper: Alex Erangle (Waves)
- Highest scoring: Anstrengung United 18–0 Spartans (14 December 2024)
- Longest losing run: Spartans (10)

The 2024–25 Mumbai Super League was the football league of the Mumbai Football League, run by the Mumbai Football Association. It represents the 3rd tier of the Maharashtra football league system. The top three teams at the end of the playoffs are promoted to the Mumbai Premier League.

Mumbai City U19 were crowned champions last season, followed by India On Track FC and Bombay Gymkhana in second and third place. These teams were promoted to the 2024–25 Mumbai Premier League season. JMJ FC was demoted to the Super League after withdrawing mid-season.

The 2024-25 MFA Super League season was prefixed by the MFA Independence Cup which included 16 Super League teams. The final, which was played on 15 August, was won by Mumbai Ultras FC.

== Teams and venue ==
45 teams participated in the 2024–25 edition of the Mumbai Super League. Matches were played at the Neville D'Souza Ground in Bandra.

The following teams have changed division since the 2024–25 season:

=== Entered Mumbai Super League ===
Promoted from 2023–24 First Division

- Shastri Nagar
- Don Bosco Academy
- South Mumbai United
- Regal Sports
- Rudra FC – JBU
- Waves FC
- Oscar Foundation
- Anstrengung United
- United City – FSA
- Bombay Gymkhana Colts

Relegated from the 2023–24 Mumbai Premier League

- JMJ Sports

=== Left Mumbai Super League ===
Promoted to the 2024–25 Mumbai Premier League

- Mumbai City B
- India On Track FC
- Bombay Gymkhana

Relegated to 2024–25 MFA First Division Championship

- None

== League tables ==
=== Group A ===
Pos	Team	Pld	W	D	L	GF	GA	GD	Pts	Qualification
1	Charkop FC	11	9	1	1	34	6	+28	28	Qualification for playoffs
2	Waves	11	7	3	1	37	12	+25	24	Qualification for playoffs
3	Football School of India	11	7	3	1	27	10	+17	24	
4	CFCI B	10	7	1	2	32	10	+22	22	
5	Mumbai Strikers	11	6	1	4	22	20	+2	19	
6	Iron Born B	11	5	3	3	19	12	+7	18	
7	Don Bosco Academy	11	3	4	4	25	17	+8	13	
8	Soccer XI	10	4	1	5	21	27	−6	13	
9	Symbians	11	2	2	7	16	26	−10	8	
10	India Rush	11	2	1	8	11	34	−23	7	
11	Mumbai Atletico	11	2	0	9	13	52	−39	6	
12	Rudra-JBU	11	1	0	10	10	41	−31	3	

Source: MSL Group A Standings Football Counter
Rules for classification: 1) points; 2) head-to-head points 3) head-to-head goal difference; 4) head-to-head goals scored 5) goal difference 6) goals scored

=== Group B ===
Pos	Team	Pld	W	D	L	GF	GA	GD	Pts	Qualification
1	Mumbai Ultras	10	8	1	1	39	10	+29	25	Qualification for playoffs
2	ROQS	10	7	2	1	27	6	+21	23	Qualification for playoffs
3	Soccer Saga	10	6	2	2	16	10	+6	20	
4	Anstrengung United	10	6	1	3	41	16	+25	19	
5	ICL U19	10	5	1	4	22	15	+7	16	
6	United Villagers	10	4	1	5	27	29	−2	13	
7	Oscar Foundation	10	3	2	5	32	23	+9	11	
8	Young Boys	10	2	5	3	25	22	+3	11	
9	Ratnam	10	2	4	4	23	28	−5	10	
10	JMJ Sports	10	2	1	7	19	29	−10	7	
11	Spartans	10	0	0	10	10	93	−83	0	

Source: MSL Group B Standings Football Counter
Rules for classification: 1) points; 2) head-to-head points 3) head-to-head goal difference; 4) head-to-head goals scored 5) goal difference 6) goals scored

=== Group C ===
Pos	Team	Pld	W	D	L	GF	GA	GD	Pts	Qualification
1	Tarun Sporting	10	8	0	2	33	9	+24	24	Qualification for playoffs
2	Young Guns India	10	7	1	2	25	12	+13	22	Qualification for playoffs
3	Young Guns Bandra	10	6	2	2	38	9	+29	20	
4	Somaiya	10	6	1	3	15	11	+4	19	
5	Salsette FC	10	5	1	4	21	14	+7	16	
6	Skorost United	9	5	0	4	10	14	−4	15	
7	Shastri Nagar	9	4	1	4	15	11	+4	13	
8	Mumbai Marines	10	3	1	6	20	26	−6	10	
9	Bombay YMCA	10	3	0	7	16	41	−25	9	
10	ICL Youngstars	10	2	1	7	10	19	−9	7	
11	Regal	10	0	2	8	7	44	−37	2	

Source: MSL Group C Standings Football Counter
Rules for classification: 1) points; 2) head-to-head points 3) head-to-head goal difference; 4) head-to-head goals scored 5) goal difference 6) goals scored

=== Group D ===
Pos	Team	Pld	W	D	L	GF	GA	GD	Pts	Qualification
1	Brothers Football Welfare	10	9	0	1	42	10	+32	27	Qualification for playoffs
2	Mumbai Soccer Prodigies	10	7	2	1	33	12	+21	23	Qualification for playoffs
3	Bombay Gymkhana Colts	10	6	1	3	29	14	+15	19	
4	KSA Juniors	10	6	1	3	28	25	+3	19	
5	West Zone United	10	5	1	4	30	16	+14	16	
6	United City	10	5	0	5	27	18	+9	15	
7	Kopana	10	4	2	4	22	20	+2	14	
8	South Mumbai FC	10	4	1	5	22	21	+1	13	
9	Millat B	10	3	1	6	23	40	−17	10	
10	Kenkre U19	10	1	0	9	15	42	−27	3	
11	Colaba FC	10	0	1	9	6	59	−53	1	

Source: MSL Group D Standings Football Counter
Rules for classification: 1) points; 2) head-to-head points 3) head-to-head goal difference; 4) head-to-head goals scored 5) goal difference 6) goals scored

== Playoffs ==
The top two teams from each group qualify for the playoff round, starting with the quarterfinals. Initially it was decided that the top four teams in the playoffs get promoted, would be promoted to the Mumbai Premier League. but only the top three were allowed promotion. Mumbai Ultras secured a playoff spot with a 3-1 win over ICL U-19. Mumbai Soccer Prodigies joined them with a string of wins, including a 7-1 victory over Kenkre U-19.

=== Group A ===
Pos	Team	Pld	W	D	L	GF	GA	GD	Pts	Qualification
1	Waves FC	3	2	1	0	7	2	+5	7	Final round
2	Mumbai Soccer Prodigies	3	2	1	0	7	2	+5	7	Final round
3	Charkop FC	3	1	0	2	4	4	0	3	
4	Tarun Sporting	3	0	0	3	3	13	−10	0	

Source: Football Counter
Rules for classification: 1) points; 2) head-to-head points 3) head-to-head goal difference; 4) head-to-head goals scored 5) goal difference 6) goals scored

=== Group B ===
Pos	Team	Pld	W	D	L	GF	GA	GD	Pts	Qualification
1	Mumbai Ultras	3	2	1	0	12	3	+9	7	Final round
2	Brothers Football Welfare	3	2	1	0	9	3	+6	7	Final round
3	Young Guns India	3	0	1	2	2	7	−5	1	
4	ROQS	3	0	1	2	2	12	−10	1	

Source: Football Counter
Rules for classification: 1) points; 2) head-to-head points 3) head-to-head goal difference; 4) head-to-head goals scored 5) goal difference 6) goals scored

== Final round ==
The final round of the Mumbai Super League sees four teams battle it out in a round-robin format. Waves FC, Mumbai Soccer Prodigies, Mumbai Ultras and Brothers SA confirmed their place in the final round.

Pos	Team	Pld	W	D	L	GF	GA	GD	Pts	Qualification
1	Mumbai Soccer Prodigies	3	2	0	1	8	6	+2	6	Champions and promotion to Mumbai Premier League
2	Waves FC	3	1	2	0	3	1	+2	5	Promotion to Mumbai Premier League
3	Mumbai Ultras	3	1	1	1	5	5	0	4	Promotion to Mumbai Premier League
4	Brothers Football Welfare	3	0	1	2	4	8	−4	1	

Source: Football Counter
Rules for classification: 1) points; 2) head-to-head points 3) head-to-head goal difference; 4) head-to-head goals scored 5) goal difference 6) goals scored

== Individual awards ==
Best goalkeeper: Alex Erangle (Waves)

Best defender: Devesh Pandey (Mumbai Ultras)

Best midfielder: Sunny Koli (Waves)

Best striker: Nihal Colaco (Mumbai Soccer Prodigies)

== See also ==
- 2024–25 Mumbai Premier League
- 2024–25 I-League 3
- 2024–25 Indian State Leagues
- 2024–25 in Indian football
