= Mumbai Marines FC =

Indian association football club

Mumbai Marines
- Full name: Mumbai Marines Football Club
- Short name: MMFC
- Founded: 2017; 9 years ago
- Ground: Various
- Owner: Mumbai Marines Sports Club LLP
- League: MFA Super League
- 2023–24: MFA Super League, 8th
Home colours	Away colours

Mumbai Marines Football Club is an Indian professional football club based in Mumbai, Maharashtra. The club competes in MFA Super League of Mumbai Football League. The club was established in 2017. Mumbai Marines finished fourth in the 2021–22 season and gained its inaugural promotion to the MFA Super Division.

== History ==
The club was founded and registered with the Mumbai Football Association in 2017 and played their first official league, MFA Third Division. In its first 5 years of existence, Mumbai Marines have gained three back to back promotions in Mumbai Football League. In 2018–19, club reached the round of 16 of MFA Third Division and gained promotion to the MFA Second Division. In 2019–20, the club was crowned runners-up of the MFA Second Division and promoted to MFA First Division. In the 2021–22 season, the club reached semi-final and finished fourth in the MFA First Division, which resulted in gaining promotion to the MFA Super Division.

== Honours ==
=== Domestic league ===
- MFA First Division
  - Semi-finalist (1): 2021–22
- MFA Second Division
  - Runners-up (1): 2019–20
