= India On Track FC =

Indian association football club based in Mumbai

India On Track
- Full name: India On Track Football Club
- Short name: IOT
- Founded: 2018; 8 years ago
- Ground: Neville D'souza Ground
- Owner: Gaurav Modwel
- Head coach: Yash Shah
- League: Maharashtra State Senior Men's Football League
- 2024–25: Mumbai Premier League, champions
- Website: https://indiaontrack.in
Home colours	Away colours	Third colours

India On Track F.C. is an Indian professional football club based in Mumbai, Maharashtra. The club competes in the Maharashtra State Senior Men's Football League. India On Track Football Club has achieved 5 consecutive promotions, starting from the lowest tier in 2018.

== History ==
India On Track F.C. is a subsidiary of India On Track, a sports management company. IOT's International Football Development Programme (IFDP) has produced players like Kajol D'Souza and Jay Gupta. The club was established in 2018 and began its first competitive season in the Third Division Championship. Since its inception, the club has won a championship title in First Division Championship (2022–2023) and was runners-up in the 2023–24 Mumbai Super League. India On Track F.C. went unbeaten for 1083 days, before the 2024–25 Mumbai Premier League season. On the final day of the season, India On Track beat MYJ-GMSC to become champions and qualify for the I-League 3.

== Seasons overview ==
Season	League	Division	Position
2019–20	MFL	Division 3	4th
2021–22	MFL	Division 2	4th
2022–23	MFL	Division 1	1st
2023–24	MFL	Mumbai Super League	2nd
2024–25	MFL	Mumbai Premier League	1st

Statistics
Season	GP	W	D	L	GF	GA	GD	Win %
2022–23	12	11	1	0	31	6	25	91.6 %
2023–24	17	12	5	0	46	8	38	70.5 %
2024–25	17	12	4	1	43	9	34	70.5 %

== Honours ==
=== Domestic ===
- Mumbai Premier League
  - Champions: 2024–25
- MFA Super Division
  - Runners up: 2023–24
- MFA First Division
  - Champions: 2022–23
