= Maharashtra Oranje FC =

Indian association football club

Maharashtra Oranje
- Full name: Maharashtra Oranje Football Club
- Nickname: Oranje
- Short name: MOFC
- Founded: 2017; 9 years ago
- Ground: Cooperage Ground; Neville D'Souza Ground
- Capacity: 5,000
- Owner: Satyajeet Saaini
- League: Maharashtra State Senior Men's Football League
- 2024–25: MSSMFL, 3rd of 8
- Website: theoranjeacademy.com
Home colours	Away colours	Third colours

Maharashtra Oranje Football Club (formerly known as The Oranje Football Club) is an Indian professional football club based in Powai, Mumbai, Maharashtra. It has previously competed in the Mumbai Premier League (the top division of the Mumbai Football League).

== History ==
Based in Powai, Mumbai, the Oranje Football Academy derived its name from the Dutch philosophy of total football. Satyajeet Saaini, a mechanical engineer by qualification and a self-taught footballer, founded the Oranje Football Academy in January 2016 with more than 200 students. They have established coaching centers in Powai Vihar, Hiranandani, and Bhandup.

In 2017, the Oranje Football Academy assembled a first-team named The Oranje FC. In 2018, they competed in the MFA 3rd Division for the first time. From 2019 onwards, they competed in three MFA Divisions (3rd, 2nd, and 1st) and multiple age groups. In 2022, they competed for the first time as The Oranje FC (ICL Payyade SC) in the 2021–22 MFA Elite Division the premier division of the Mumbai Football League. In the 2022–23 MFA Elite Division season, they finish 4th for the second season running.

In September 2023, The Oranje FC took over Atlanta FC, which was one-half of Ambernath United Atlanta who qualified for 2023–24 I-League 2 in the previous season. As a result, Maharashtra Oranje FC competed in the 2023–24 I-League 2 season in place of Ambernath United Atlanta. However, they were relegated to 2024–25 I-League 3 after accumulating just 15 points from 14 games.

They were further relegated from 2024–25 I-League 3 to 2024–25 Mumbai Premier League after failing to win any of their games.

== Honours ==
=== Domestic ===
- Mumbai Premier League
  - Champions: 2025–26
