= Maharashtra State Senior Men's Football League =

Football league in India

- Organising body: Western India Football Association; Mumbai Football Association
- Founded: 2025; 1 year ago
- Country: India
- Number of clubs: 8
- Level on pyramid: 5
- Promotion to: I-League 3
- Relegation to: Mumbai Premier League; Pune Football League
- Domestic cup: Nadkarni Cup
- Current champions: Magic Made Soccer (2025)
- Website: https://wifa.in/
- Current: 2026

The Maharashtra State Senior Menʼs Football League (MSSMFL) is the highest state-level football league in the Indian state of Maharashtra, organised by the Western India Football Association, currently contested by 8 clubs.

== History ==
For the inaugural edition, eight clubs from six regions competed in a unified, month-long league at the Sinhgad Sports Complex in Lonavala from May 10 to June 5, 2025. The league follows a double round-robin format with 56 matches, offering a platform for the I-League 3 promotion.

== Champions ==
Season	Champion	Runners-up	Ref
2024–25	Magic Made Soccer	MYJ–GMSC	

== See also ==
- Mumbai Football League
- Pune Football League
