= Sports in Maharashtra =

Overview of situation of sport in Indian state, Maharashtra

Sports play an integral part of culture in the Indian state of Maharashtra. Cricket is the most popular spectator sport in the state. Other popular sports include kabaddi and kho kho, which are played in rural areas, and field hockey, badminton, and table tennis, which are more common in urban areas, schools, and colleges. In the state's southern rural regions, annual wrestling championships such as Hind Kesari and Maharashtra Kesari are held. Games like Gillidanda and variations of Tag are played among children.

The Mumbai cricket team represents Mumbai, Palghar, and Thane districts in Indian domestic cricket, whilst the Maharashtra cricket team represents the rest of the state. Maharashtra Cricket Association (MCA) governs cricket in the state except for the Mumbai region. The state is home to international standard stadiums including Wankhede Stadium in Mumbai and Maharashtra Cricket Association Stadium in Pune. In the Indian Premier League (IPL), the Mumbai Indians franchise represents the state from Mumbai; the women's team plays in the Women's Premier League. The Maharashtra Open, a tennis ATP 250 tournament, is annually held in Shree Shiv Chhatrapati Sports Complex, Pune. In addition, Pune hosted the 2008 Commonwealth Youth Games.

== History ==
=== Pre-colonial sports ===
In ancient India, a Martial arts called mallavidya was practiced. It was a form of grappling that was more complex than wrestling, and was performed in earthen mud pits called akhadas or talims, some of which can still be found in Maharashtra today. Historical depictions of the martial art can be seen on archaeological sculptures from the region at numerous locations, such as Kharosa or Pavnar.

Baji Rao II, the last Peshwa of the Maratha Empire, was a patron of strength and wrestling competitions during the early 19th century. Under his patronage, the sport of Mallakhamba (pole gymnastics) was developed in Pune by Balambhat Deodhar. After Baji Rao lost power and was exiled to northern India, Deodhar brought malkhamb and mallavidya to other Maratha-ruled states such as Vadodara and Gwalior. In the later 19th and early 20th centuries, other rulers such as those of Kolhapur and Aundh, Pune were also patrons of organised wrestling and sporting festivals. Among the rulers of these princely states, horse riding, wrestling, fencing, archery, and shooting gained popularity.

=== Imported sports under British rule ===
British rule in India drastically changed the landscape of sports in Maharastra. Like in other regions of India, British rulers and aristocrats enjoyed outdoor sports and built facilities for their own leisure. This led to the introduction of several British sports, including cricket, and the development of the new game of badminton. New infrastructure—such as the building of a dam at Bund Garden in 1860—allowed for recreational boating on the Mula-Mutha river. In addition, the colonial rulers introduced horse racing; some racecourses built during this period, such as the Mahalaxmi Racecourse and Pune Race Course, are still in operation today.

By the late 19th century, the British had constructed numerous sports clubs that were exclusively white or restricted based on religion, such as Poona Europeans, Poona Parsees, and Poona Hindu Gymkhana. While many of the religion-based clubs were dominated by educated Brahmins, there were also some lower-caste sports stars such as the brothers Palwankar Baloo and Vithal Palwankar, who played cricket in the early 20th century.

=== Indigenous sports under British rule ===
At the same time that imported sports were being developed by the British, indigenous sports continued to change and develop. However, after Indian Civil Service officer Walter Charles Rand was assassinated in 1897 by the Chapekar brothers who ran a wrestling venue in Pune, British colonial authorities viewed these indigenous sports venues with suspicion. A committee was established in 1914 in order to set rules for kho-kho. The formalization of Indian sports continued in the region, and the Deccan Gymkhana sports club was instrumental in organizing the first Indian delegation to an Olympic games, which participated in the 1920 Summer Olympics. Other clubs, such as the Maharashtra Mandal club, which formed in the early 20th century, promoted physical culture and education by hosting both indigenous and Western sports.

Other indigenous sports and exercises developed as well, especially yoga. In the 1920s, Bhawanrao Shriniwasrao Pant Pratinidhi, the ruler of Aundh State, helped popularize the series of yoga positions called Surya Namaskar, a flowing sequence of salutations to the sun. This series contained popular asanas (positions) such as upward and downward dog and Uttanasana which helped to popularize yoga as exercise.

Beginning in the 1910s, local Indian organizations were established in order to propagate and develop Indian physical culture. One such organization, initially called Hanuman Akhara, was formed in 1922 by the Vaidya brothers in Amravati and eventually became the Hanuman Vyayam Prasarak Mandal (HVPM). A satellite organization of the HVPM helped to revise the rules for kabaddi in the 1930s after the Indian YMCA had first formulated the rules in earlier years.

== Administration ==
The Directorate of Sports and Youth Services (Maharashtra) is the governing body which is responsible for sports in Maharashtra. The directorate is a part of the School Education and Sports Department of the Government of Maharashtra and is let by the Sports and Youth Welfare Minister of Maharashtra.

The Maharashtra Olympic Association, affiliated with the Indian Olympic Association, is responsible for the selection and participation of the state's contingent in the Olympic Games, Commonwealth Games, Asian Games, and for the South Asian Games in Maharashtra.

The Maharashtra Cricket Association is the governing body for cricket activities in Maharashtra and for the Maharashtra cricket team. It is affiliated with the Board of Control for Cricket in India. The Maharashtra Cricket Association is one of three cricket associations based in Maharashtra, along with Mumbai Cricket Association and Vidarbha Cricket Association.

The Western India Football Association (WIFA) is the governing body for football in Maharashtra, and was established on 12 July 1911. It is affiliated with the All India Football Federation, the sport's national governing body for all of India.

=== Sports policy ===
The Maharashtra government announced its first sports policy in 1996, the first Indian state to do so. After five years, in 2001, the state government launched a second sports policy for a ten-year period, which had the motto "Fitness for all through Sports". As part of this policy, the Sports Infrastructure Development Plan was created and a reservation was made for a sportsperson in government and semi-government jobs. In 2012, a third sports policy was declared, which created financial assistance to prepare the state for participation in international competitions.

== Indigenous sports ==
Indian sports—include badminton, kabaddi, kho kho, atya patya, langdi, and mallakhamba—originated in or were formalised in Maharashtra. In rural areas of Maharashtra, kusti (Indian mud wrestling) and bullock cart competitions can regularly be seen during the annual jatra carnival. The Maharashtran government has supported kusti in the state by constructing two permanent training centers for the sport in the Kolhapur area.

=== Indian wrestling ===
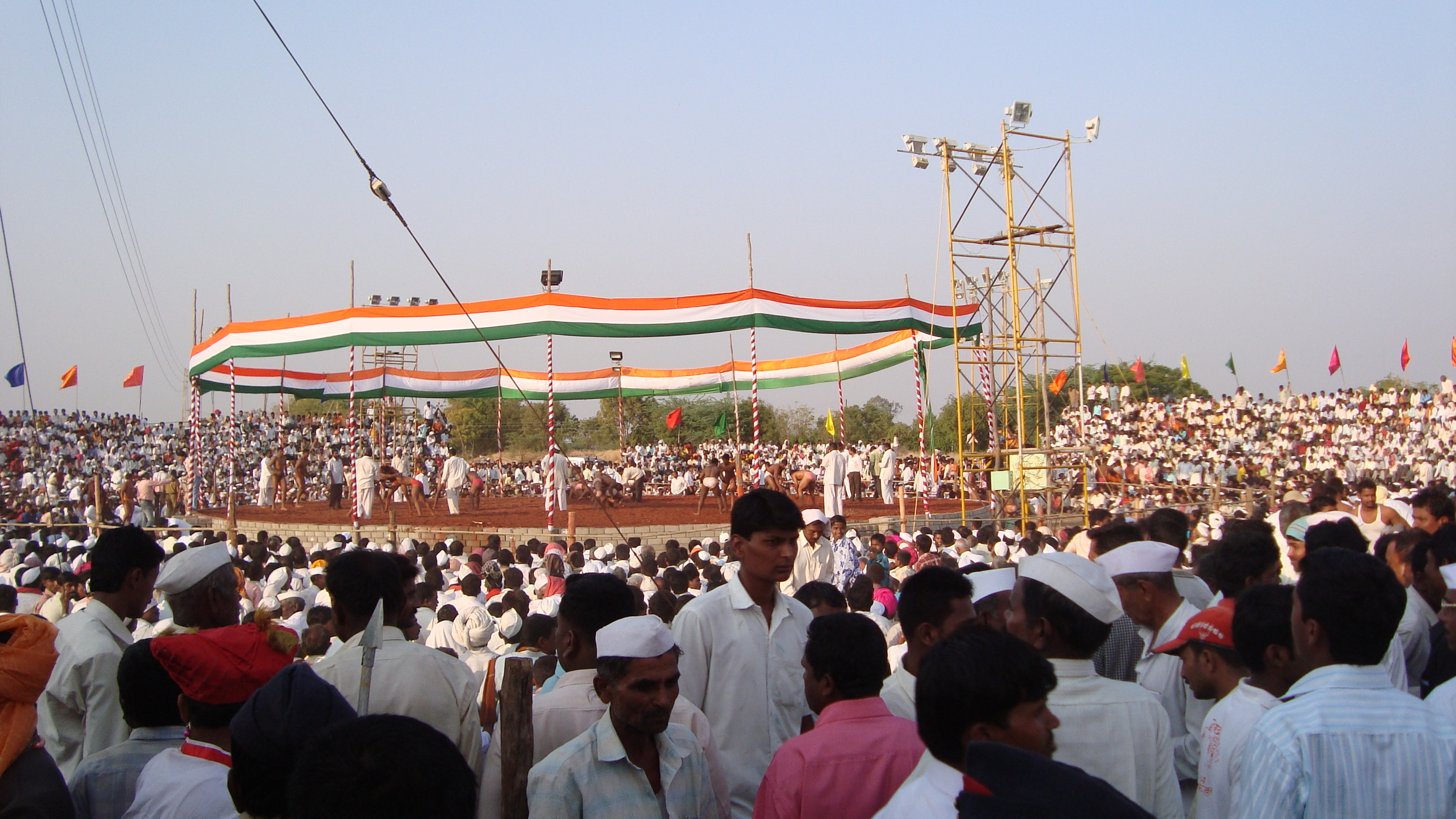
A kushti competition at Jawla in Solapur district

Despite cricket's dominance in most of India, wrestling has maintained its popularity in Maharashtra, especially in the rural regions of the state and Kolhapur district. One famous wrestler from the state was K. D. Jadhav, who won a bronze medal in the 1952 Summer Olympics; he was the first citizen from the newly independent nation of India to win an Olympic medal in an individual sport.

In kusti, a style of traditional wrestling, matches are typically held in a clay or dirt pit in which the soil is mixed with ghee and other materials. This sport encompasses an ancient subculture in which wrestlers live and train together and following strict rules on diet and leisure. The focus is on living a pure life and building one's strength and skills, and abstaining from drinking, smoking, and sex. The wrestlers' diets consist of milk, Almond, ghee, eggs, and chapattis. Kusti represents the intersection of sports, politics, and culture and is deeply embedded in the agrarian economy of rural Maharashtra.

Another style of wrestling popular in Maharashtra is that associated with Hind Kesari, a wrestling championship established in 1958 and affiliated with the All India Amateur Wrestling Federation (AIAWF). Most common in the rural areas of Western Maharashtra, wrestlers train in schools called taleems, in which wrestling gurus instruct students on both physical and moral instruction in a style of wrestling that blends spiritual and secular practices. The largest tournaments in the state draw top wrestlers from the region and even outside India, including from Pakistan, Iran, Turkey, and several African nations.

== Field hockey ==
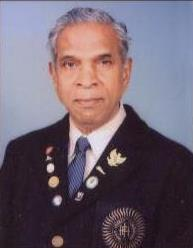
Hiranna Nimal, silver medalist at the 1962 Asian Games

Field hockey is one of the most popular sports in Maharashtra. Up to thirty domestic tournaments of the sport are held in a calendar year in Pune alone, such as the All India Bombay Gold Cup Hockey Tournament and the All India Aagha Khan Hockey Tournament. The state is home to three hockey clubs playing in different leagues, and was home to a now-defunct club called the Maratha Warriors, who competed in the Premier Hockey League. The Mumbai Magicians are based in Mumbai and play in the Hockey India League. The Mumbai Marines and the Pune Strykers play in the World Series Hockey.

Mahindra Hockey Stadium serves as the home venue of the Mumbai Marines and Mumbai Magicians, and used to be the home venue of the Maratha Warriors. The stadium hosted the 1982 Men's Hockey World Cup. PCMC Hockey Stadium serves as the home venue of the Pune Strykers.

Many individual Maharashtrian have also contributed to India's hockey legacy. Tushar Khandker is referred to as "the Goal Poacher". Hiranna Nimal was a silver medalist at the 1962 Asian Games and also represented Maharashtra in many other national and international leagues. Other notable hockey stars from the state include Dhanraj Pillay and Viren Rasquinha.

== Cricket ==
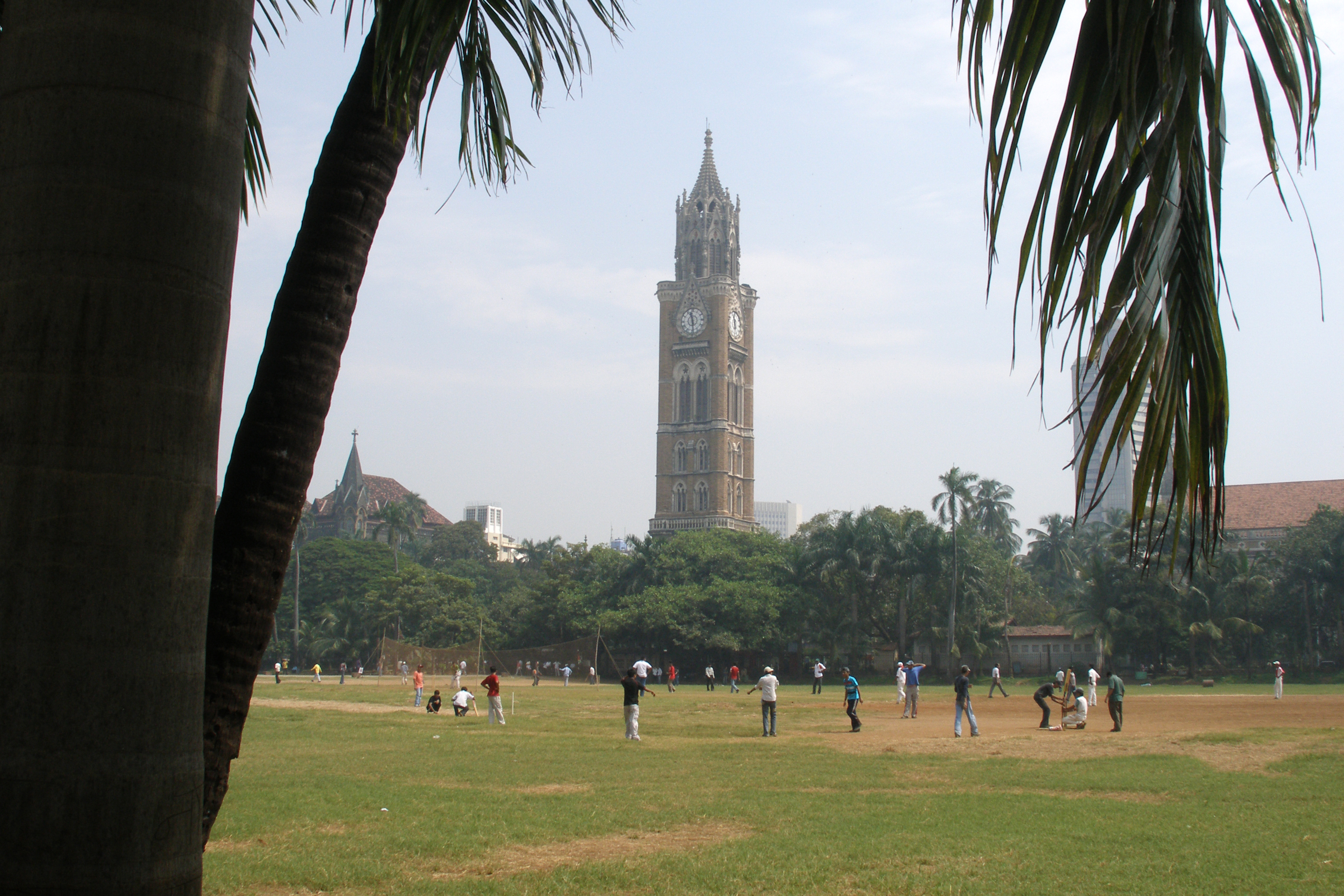
Playing cricket at Oval Maidan, Mumbai

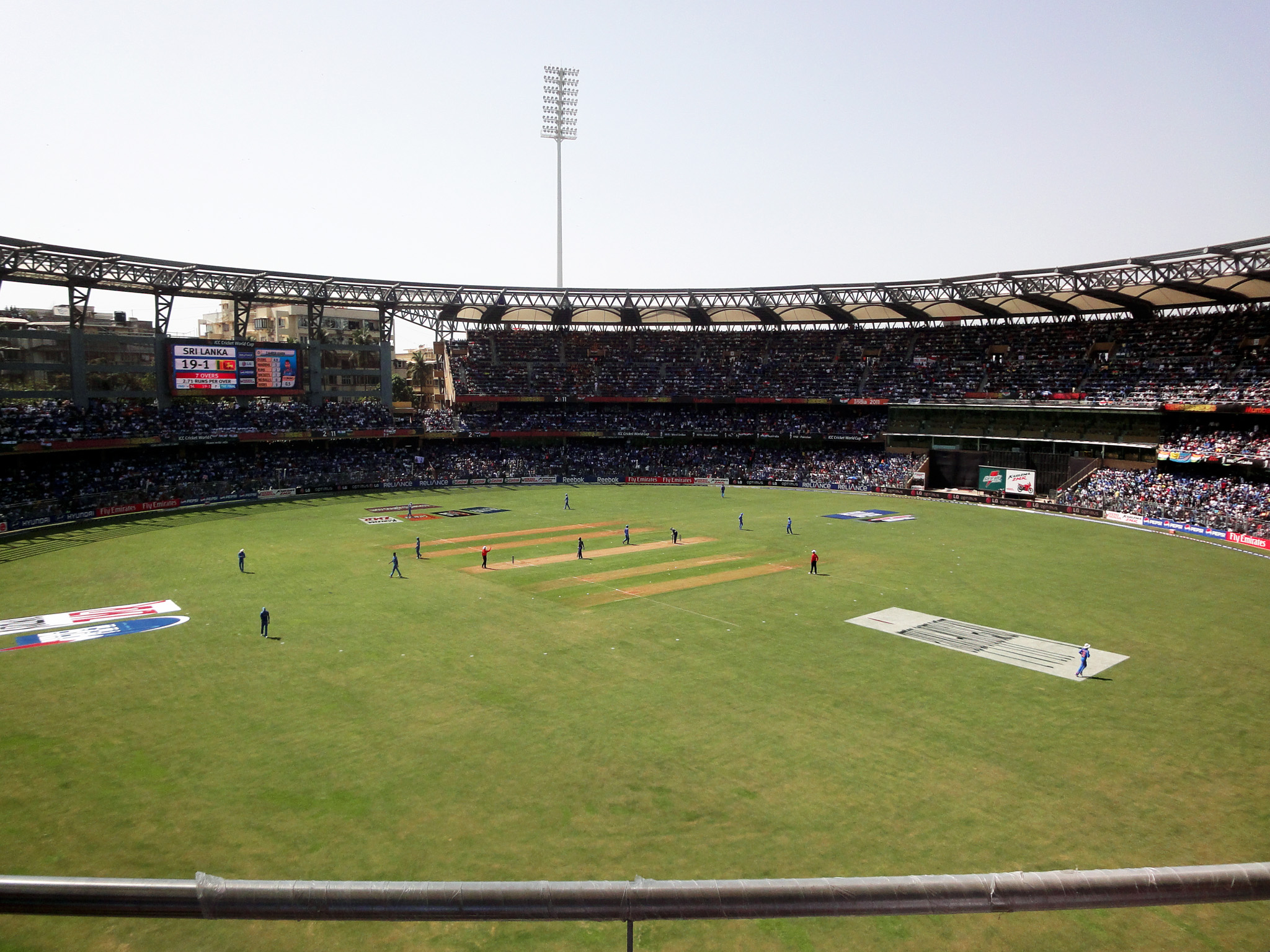
Wankhede Stadium during the first innings of the 2011 Cricket World Cup Final between Sri Lanka and India

Cricket is played at domestic and international levels in Maharashtra and is consistently supported by people from most parts of the state. Maharashtra is home to the Maharashtra cricket team, Vidarbha cricket team, Veer Marathi cricket franchise, Mumbai Indians, and the regionally dominant Mumbai cricket team. The Mumbai cricket team was the dominant franchise for much of the 20th century, winning the first Ranji Trophy Championship over North India in 1935 and winning fifteen consecutive Ranji Trophy victories between 1958–1973. Mumbai is the most successful team in the history of the Ranji Trophy championship, winning 40 titles over the course of its history, as well as the most successful team in the Irani Trophy, with 16 titles won.

The Mumbai cricket team is overseen by the Mumbai Cricket Association and the Maharashtra cricket team is overseen by the Maharashtra Cricket Association. The Mumbai cricket team and Mumbai Indians both have their home grounds at Wankhede Stadium, an international cricket ground. Both teams play in the Indian Premier League, of which the Mumbai Indians was one of eight founding members in 2008.

The Maharashtra Cricket Association set up a T20 franchise league called Maharashtra Premier League (MPL) in 2023, which has six teams. It sold the franchise rights for 57 crore rupees for three years through open bidding. The inaugural season was expected to start on 15 June 2023, at the association's Pune's stadium.

Maharashtra is home to India's first cricket museum, Blades of Glory, which is based in Pune and run by Rohan Pate, a former cricketer. It opened during the 2013 Indian Premier League season.

== Football ==
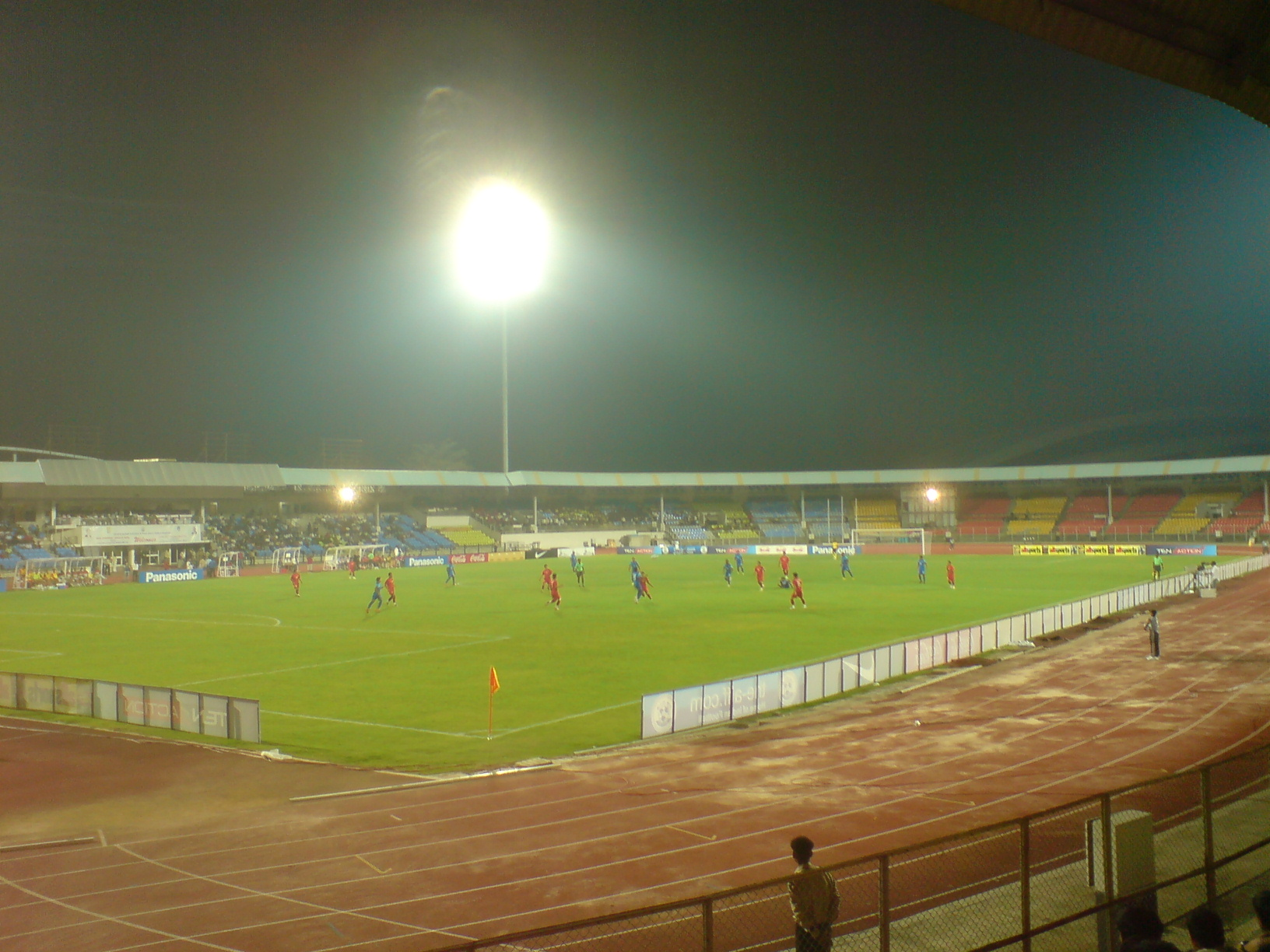
India versus Vietnam football match in the Shree Shiv Chhatrapati Sports Complex

Football is another popular sport in many parts of the state, with the FIFA World Cup and the English Premier League being followed widely. The Maharashtra Football Pyramid consists of district leagues, each of which are broken into sub-leagues. This pyramid operates during the whole calendar year, but at different times. In the Indian Football League, Mumbai was represented by Mumbai FC, Mahindra United FC, and Air India FC. Pune FC was established in August 2007 and is a recently founded football club in the I-League. There is local rivalry among the Mumbai-based clubs Air India FC and Mumbai FC, and state rivalry with Pune FC. Matches between these teams are called the "Maha Derby", as they are played in Maharashtra. Maharashtra is also represented in the Santosh Trophy by the Maharashtra football team, who last won the trophy in the 1999–2000 Santosh Trophy.

The Western India Football Association (WIFA) signed a deal with Sporting Ace, a sports management company, to infuse new investments into Maharashtra football. The Mumbai Football Association (MDFA) is the organisation responsible for association football in and around Mumbai. The MDFA organises around seven leagues that contain more than 300 club sides in total, in addition to being responsible for six of India's I-League sides.

Seven-a-side football is also hugely popular in Maharashtra. The eighth Motilal Mathurawala Trophy Seven-a-side Junior National Football Championship was held in Pune.

=== Football clubs in Maharashtra ===
Club	Primary league	Venue	Established	Status
Air India FC	I-League	Cooperage Ground	1952	Active
Mahindra United FC	I-League	Cooperage Ground	1962	Defunct (2010)
DSK Shivajians	I-League	Shree Shiv Chhatrapati Sports Complex	1987	Defunct (2017)
Bengal Mumbai FC	Mumbai Football League	Cooperage Ground	1998	Defunct (2011)
Kenkre FC	I-League	Cooperage Ground	2000	Active
ONGC FC	I-League	Cooperage Ground	2006	Active
PIFA Sports FC	Mumbai Football League	Cooperage Ground	2006	Active
Mumbai Tigers FC	Mumbai Football League	None	2006	Defunct (2014)
Mumbai FC	I-League	Cooperage Ground	2007	Defunct (2017)
Pune FC	I-League	Shree Shiv Chhatrapati Sports Complex	2007	Defunct (2016)
Ambernath United Atlanta FC	Mumbai Football League	Cooperage Ground	2011	Active
Mumbai City FC	Indian Super League	Mumbai Football Arena	2014	Active
FC Pune City	Indian Super League	Shree Shiv Chhatrapati Sports Complex	2014	Defunct (2019)
Bharat FC	I-League	Shree Shiv Chhatrapati Sports Complex	2014	Defunct (2015)
FC Pune City (women)	Indian Women's League	Shree Shiv Chhatrapati Sports Complex	2017	Defunct (2018)
Maharashtra Oranje FC	Maharashtra State Senior Men's Football League	Cooperage Ground	2017	Active

== American football ==
Maharashtra has two club franchises which play American football in the Elite Football League of India. The Mumbai Gladiators is a team based in Mumbai and the Pune Marathas is a team based in Pune with the Shree Shiv Chhatrapati Sports Complex as its home stadium. Maharashtra hosted the First Youth National American Football Championship in 2007 in which the Mumbai Gladiators and Pune Marathas played their first match against each other. However, neither team won the championship, which was instead won by the visiting Manipur team.

== Derby (horse racing) ==
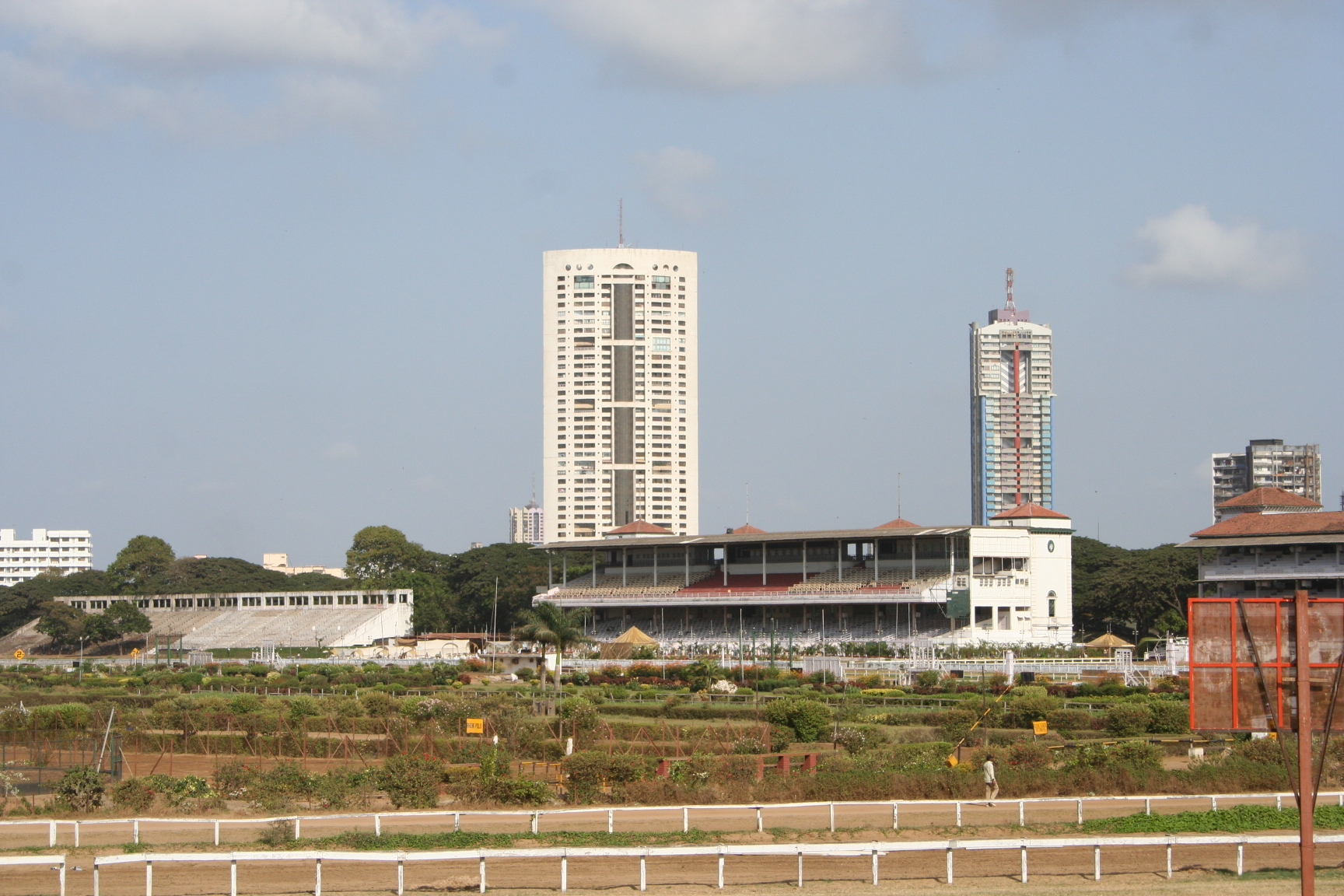
Mahalaxmi Racecourse

The horse racing season in Maharashtra starts in mid-November and ends in the last week of April. Every February, Mumbai holds derby races at the Mahalaxmi Racecourse. Since 1986, McDowell's Indian Derby has been sponsored by liquor baron Vijay Mallya's UB Group as The McDowell's Indian Derby.

The Mahalaxmi Racecourse horse racing track is one of two racecourses in Maharashtra. The track is oval with a 2,400 metres (7,900 ft) straight chute spread over approximately 225 acres (0.91 km^{2}; 0.352 sq mi). It was built in 1883 and modelled on the Caulfield Racecourse in Melbourne. Pune Race Course is the second racecourse in Maharashtra. It was built in 1830 and covers 118.5 acres (48.0 ha).

== Grand Prix ==
In March 2004, the Mumbai Grand Prix was part of the F1 powerboat world championship, and the Force India F1 team car was unveiled in Mumbai in 2008. As of 2011, the city plans to build its own F1 track and various sites were assessed, of which the authorities have narrowed down to either Marve-Malad or Panvel-Kalyan. If approved, the track will be clubbed with a theme park and will spread over 400 to 500 acres (162 to 202 ha).

== Marathon ==
=== Mumbai Marathon ===
In 2004, the annual Mumbai Marathon was established as a part of "The Greatest Race on Earth". The Mumbai Marathon is an annual international marathon held on the third Sunday of January. The Standard Chartered Mumbai Marathon is India's biggest charity platform.

=== Pune Marathon ===
The Pune International Marathon is an annual marathon held in Pune; it was established in 1983 and was the first Indian marathon to be certified by the AIMS. The Athletics Federation of India has awarded the status of National Marathon Championship to the Pune International Marathon. Funds raised from the race are donated to Project Concern International, an NGO working towards HIV/AIDS awareness and prevention.

Race types of Pune International Marathon
No	Race Name	Distance (in kilometers)
1	Men's & Women's Marathon	42.195
2	Men's & Women's Half Marathon	21
3	Women's Half Marathon	21
4	Men's & Women's 10 km	10
5	Men's & Women's 5 km	5
6	Wheelchair (Machine & Hand)	3.5

== Tennis ==
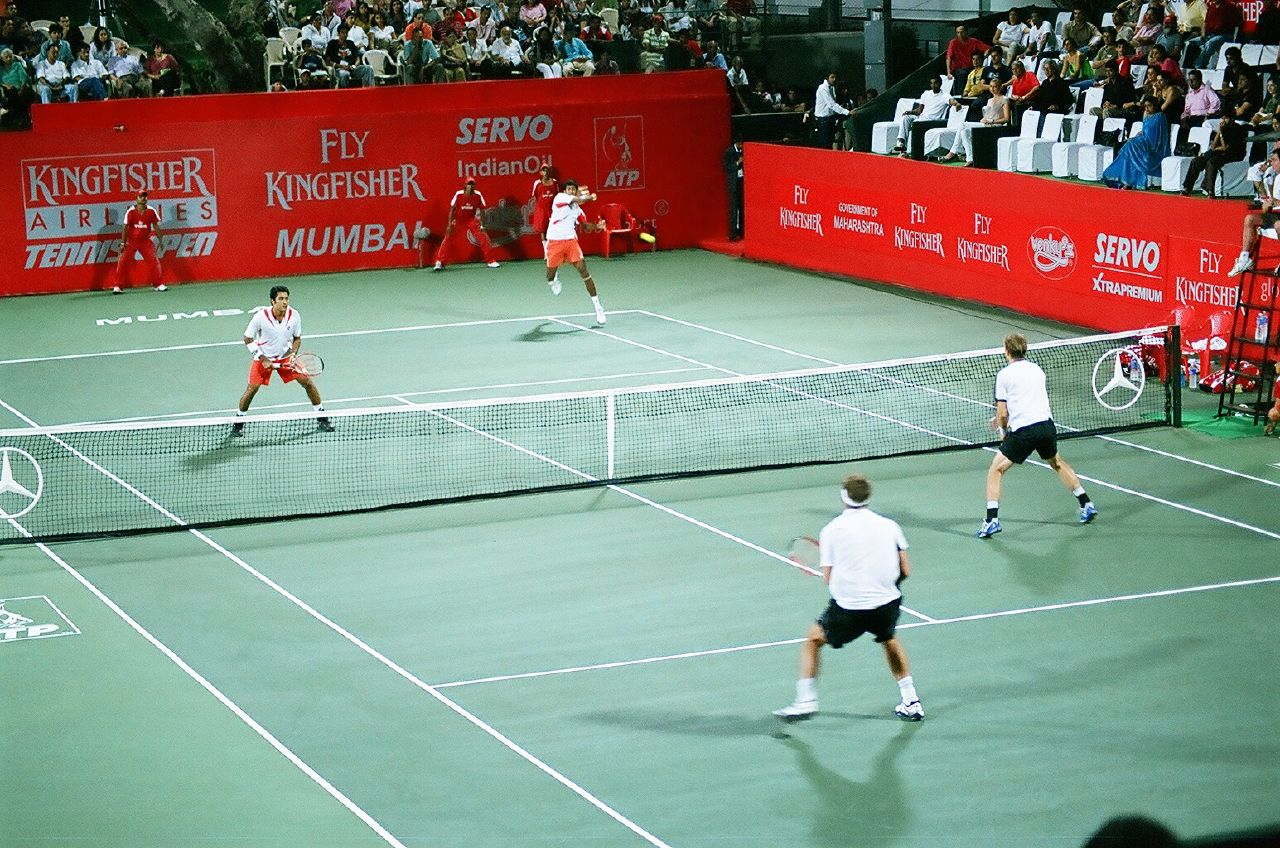
2007 Kingfisher Airlines Tennis Open men's doubles finals

ATP 250 Maharashtra Open is annually organised in Pune. It is India's only international level tennis tournament, with singles and doubles male players from the country and abroad participating. It is organised by Maharashtra Lawn Tennis Association, which is the governing body of this sport in the state.

Maharashtra has a franchise-based tennis league, the Maharashtra Tennis League (MTL), which is India's first league format in tennis. The MTL launched with a total of 80 players and five teams: the Mumbai Blasters, Sharp Smashers, Baseline Bombers, Accurate Aces, and Dazzling Deuces. Each team in the league consists of six players, at least two of which must be women and at least one of which must be from Maharashtra.

One famous Maharashtrian tennis player was Gaurav Natekar, a former Davis Cup player and seven-time Indian National Tennis Champion. He was awarded the Arjuna Award for Tennis in 1996.

Mumbai has hosted the Kingfisher Airlines Tennis Open, an International Series tournament of the ATP World Tour, in 2006 and 2007. The tournaments were played on outdoor hard courts at the Cricket Club of India in Mumbai.

== Chess ==
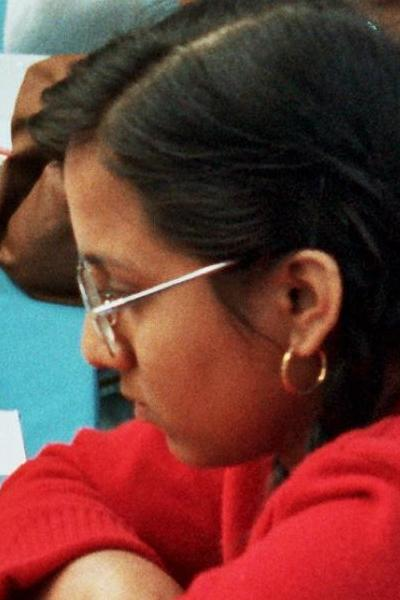
Rohini Khadilkar (Mumbai) a former women's chess champion of India

Maharashtra has a five-decade-long chess culture. The first chess association in Maharashtra was formed in 1921 and was known as the South Maharashtra Chess Club. The Sangali Chess Society was established in 1930. The Southern Maratha Country Chess Association originated in 1955. With the growth of the game in the state, the first chess body in Mumbai, known as the Bombay Chess Association, was established in 1944. Open chess tournaments started in the city in 1945. Then, in 1950, the All India Chess Federation was started in Mumbai and held tournaments at the national level for five years afterwards in Mumbai. The first Inter-State Championship was held in 1960. In 1963, the Bombay Chess Association and Southern Maratha Country Chess Association merged to form the Maharashtra Chess Association.

The Maharashtra Chess League, the first-ever IPL style chess league in India, started the PYC Hindu Gymkhana club in Pune on 24 April 2013. The tournament played on a league-cum-knock-out basis. Each team played the other five teams once, with the top four teams at the end of the league stage making it to the semifinals.

Maharashtra has produced many notable chess players, including Abhijit Kunte, Praveen Thipsay, Rohini Khadilkar, and Anupama Gokhale.

== See also ==
- Sport in India
- Outline of Maharashtra
- Marathi people
- Culture of Maharashtra
