= 2011 Roll Ball World Cup =

World Cup

The 2011 Roll Ball World Cup was the first World Cup of the game Roll ball. It was held at the Shree Shiv Chhatrapati Sports Complex in Pune. It was won by Denmark, a non-member of the International Roll Ball Federation, and host India placed second. The Cup had 28 group stage matches, 2 semi-finals and a final. There were 31 matches in total.

Tanzania from Africa, and Belgium, Belarus, Denmark, Netherlands and Sweden from Europe were the six non-members of International Rollball Federation participating in this World Cup.

== Participating teams ==
There were 16 national roll ball teams:

Africa (3)

- Kenya
- Tanzania
- Uganda

Asia (7)

- Bangladesh
- China
- Hong Kong
- India (host)
- Malaysia
- Nepal
- United Arab Emirates

Europe (6)

- Belgium
- Belarus
- Denmark (champions)
- (United Kingdom) Great Britain
- Netherlands
- Sweden

== Matches ==
17 April 2011

1. India vs Kenya
2. Denmark vs Bangladesh
3. (United Kingdom) Great Britain vs Hong Kong
4. Netherlands vs Malaysia

18 April 2011

1. Belarus vs Nepal
2. China vs Belgium
3. Denmark vs Belgium
4. (United Kingdom) Great Britain vs Tanzania
5. Netherlands vs Malaysia
6. India vs Sweden
7. Netherlands vs Nepal
8. Uganda vs Tanzania

19 April 2011

1. Bangladesh vs China
2. Denmark vs China
3. (United Kingdom) Great Britain vs Uganda
4. Hong Kong vs Uganda
5. India vs United Arab Emirates
6. Kenya vs United Arab Emirates
7. Malaysia vs Belarus
8. Netherlands vs Belarus

20 April 2011

1. Bangladesh vs Tanzania
2. Belarus vs Uganda
3. Denmark vs United Arab Emirates
4. Hong Kong vs Tanzania
5. India vs Belgium
6. Malaysia vs Nepal
7. Nepal vs (United Kingdom) Great Britain
8. Sweden vs Kenya

21 April 2011

- Visit day

22 April 2011

- Semi-final 1
  India vs Nepal
- Semi-final 2
  Denmark vs Belarus
- Final
  Denmark vs India

== See also ==
- Maha Roll Ball League
