= 2017 Roll Ball World Cup =

The 2017 Roll Ball World Cup was the 4th edition of the Roll Ball World Cup, organized by the International Roll Ball Federation (IRBF). The tournament was held for first time in Bangladesh, from 17 to 23 February 2017. 40 teams competed in the tournament.

== Participating teams ==
Some of the participating teams were:

Africa (7)

 Benin 
 Ivory Coast
 Kenya
 Zambia
 Senegal
 Egypt
 Tanzania

Asia (10)

 Bangladesh (Host)
 Bhutan
 Chinese Taipei
 India
 Iran
   Nepal
 Pakistan
 Sri Lanka
 Oman
 Saudi Arabia

Europe (8)

 England
 France
 Netherlands
 Belarus
 Denmark
 Latvia
 Turkey
 Russia

South America (2)

 Argentina
 Uruguay

== Venue ==
Dhaka	Dhaka	Dhaka	2017 Roll Ball World Cup is located in Bangladesh
Sheikh Russel Roller Skating Complex	Shaheed Tajuddin Ahmed Indoor Stadium	Shaheed Suhrawardy Indoor Stadium	2017 Roll Ball World Cup is located in Bangladesh
	Capacity: 400	Capacity: 15,000	2017 Roll Ball World Cup is located in Bangladesh

== Men's tournament ==
In the finale of men's tournament India defeated Iran by 8-7. For the third place match, Kenya won Bangladesh by 7-1.

=== Knockout stage ===
Pre quarter final
21 February
India	18
Benin	0
21 February
Bhutan	3
Zambia	8
21 February
Kenya	5
Argentina	4
21 February
Uruguay	0
Latvia	4
21 February
Bangladesh	8
England	1
21 February
Ivory Coast	5
Nepal	11
21 February
Belarus	3
Pakistan	7
21 February
Denmark	1
Iran	4

Quarter-finals
21 February
India	40
Zambia	0
21 February
Kenya	6
Latvia	5
21 February
Bangladesh	6
Nepal	3
21 February
Iran	6
Pakistan	2

Semi-finals
22 February
India	10
Kenya	4
22 February
Bangladesh	3
Iran	11

Final
23 February
India	8
Iran	7
Third place
23 February
Kenya	7
Bangladesh	1

== Women's tournament ==
In the finale of women's tournament India defeated Iran by 6-4. For the third place match, Kenya defeated Senegal by 8-1.

== See also ==
- Maha Roll Ball League
