= Balewadi =

- Suburb
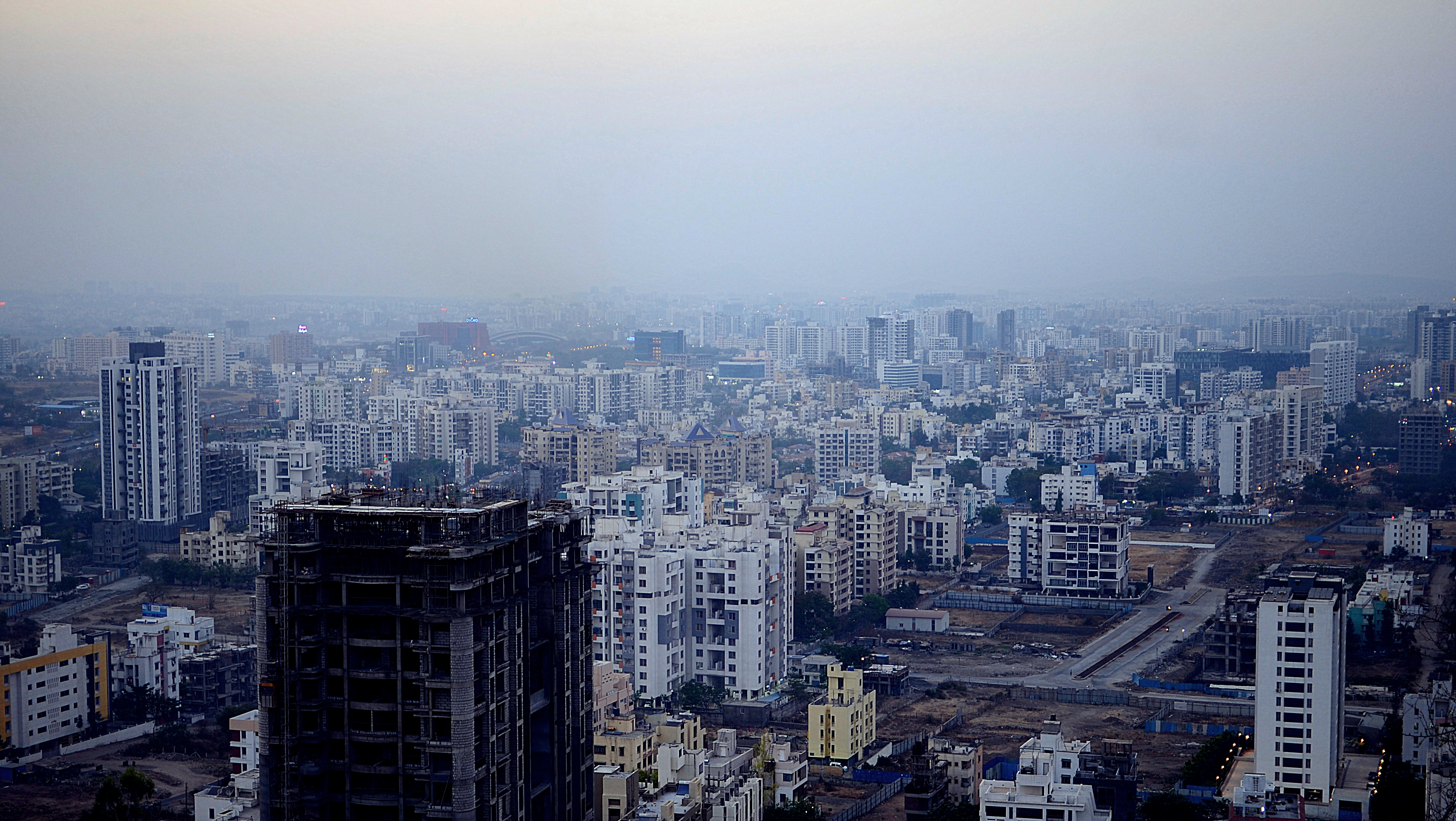
- Balewadi skyline

- Location in Maharashtra, India
- Coordinates: 18°35′1.89″N 73°46′5.83″E
- Country: India
- State: Maharashtra
- District: Pune

Languages
  - Official: Marathi
- Time zone: UTC+5:30 (IST)
- PIN: 411 045
- Vehicle registration: MH12-
- Coastline: 0 kilometres (0 mi)

Balewadi is a residential suburban town of Pune, located in the city's Western Metropolitan Corridor. It is famous for the Shree Shiv Chhatrapati Sports Complex which had hosted both the National Games in 1994 and the 2008 Commonwealth Youth Games. The complex had also hosted the second edition of Khelo India Youth Games, which kicked off on 9 January 2019.

== Infrastructure ==
Balewadi was a village at the edge of the city of Pune until 1997, when it was integrated into the limits of the Pune Municipal Corporation along with 22 other villages in various parts of the city.

Balewadi, along with neighbouring areas of Aundh and Baner are planned for development as part of the broader Smart Cities Mission initiated by the Government of India in 2015. The selected area will be developed as a model to be replicated in other parts of the city.

== Transport ==
Balewadi is linked to Pune Municipal Corporation, Pune Cantonment, Chinchwad and Alandi by Pune Mahanagar Parivahan Mahamandal Limited (PMPML) buses. The Katraj - Dehu Road corridor passes through Balewadi. Balewadi is connected to Pune via Baner Road. There are PMPML buses going to Hinjawadi via Balewadi.

Bus rapid transit is planned from the airport to Balewadi from Pune Municipal Corporation. And the third metro route of Shivaji Nagar to Hinjawadi is going to via Balewadi.

Very soon, the Pune Metro will also run through Balewadi with metro stations planned near NICMAR Institute and Balewadi High Street.

== Education ==
- National Institute of Construction Management and Research (NICMAR)

== Sports ==
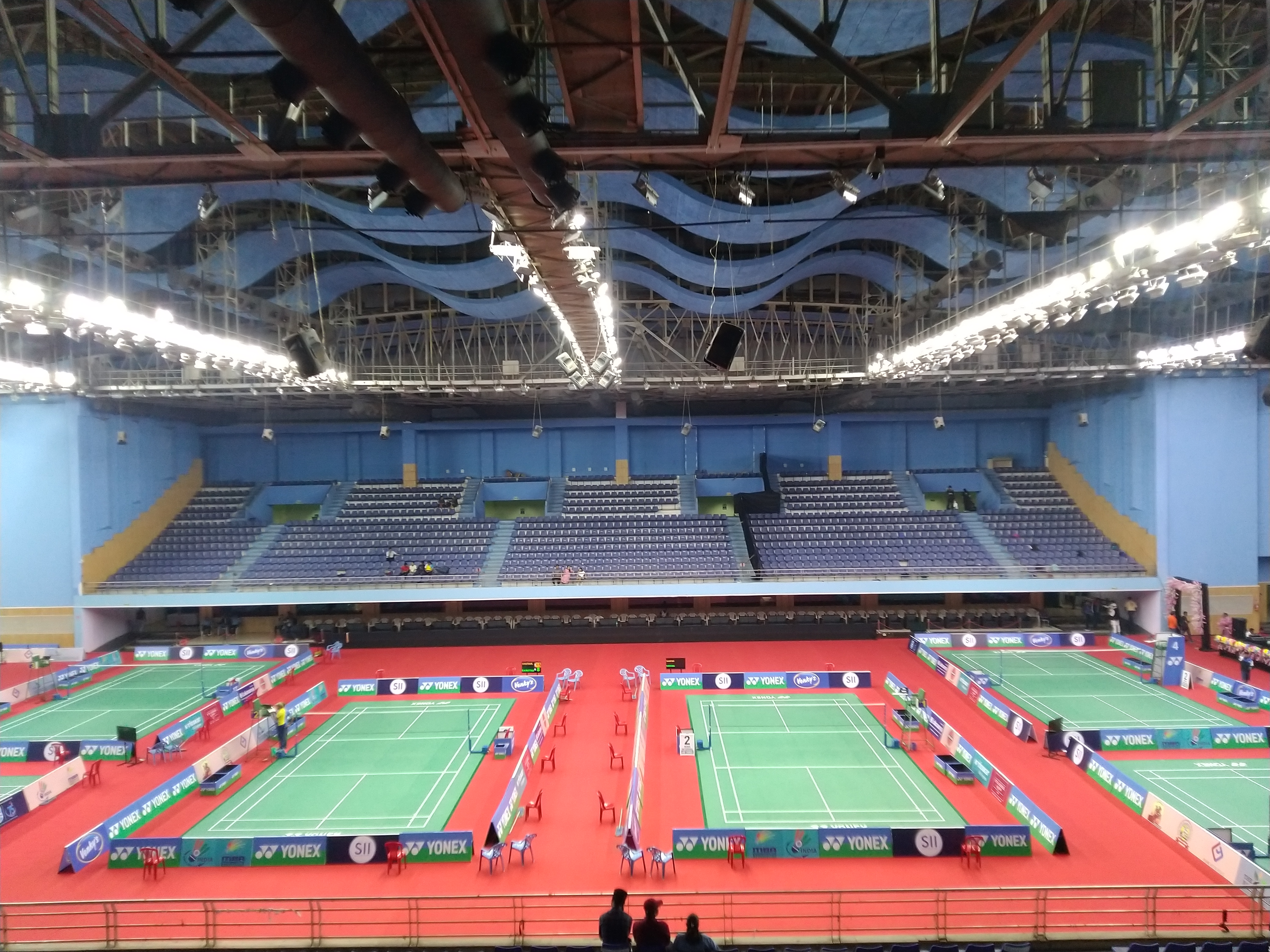
Badminton arena in Balewadi Sports Complex

Balewadi is home to the Shree Shiv Chhatrapati Sports Complex, which hosts various major sporting events and can hold roughly 20,000 spectators in its athletics stadium.

A museum dedicated to Sachin Tendulkar is also planned in Balewadi.

When the Elite Football League of India was introduced in August 2011, Pune was noted as one of eight cities to be awarded a team for the inaugural season, although the team's games will be played in Balewadi.

== Health ==
Nearest hospitals include:

- Aditya Birla Hospital
- Medipoint Hospital
- Jupiter Hospital
- Manipal Hospital on Baner Road

== Entertainment ==
A recent attraction in this location is the High Street Area, which has many upscale restaurants and pubs setting up here, which has seen influx of party goers.
