= Aditya Ganeshwade =

Indian roll ball player

Personal information
- Full name: Aditya Ganeshwade
- National team: India
- Born: 7 May 1994 (age 32) Pune, Maharashtra, India
- Website: www.adityaganeshwade.com

Sport
- Sport: Roll Ball

Aditya Ganeshwade is a professional roll ball player from India. He is the Captain of Indian roll ball team.

== Early life ==
Aditya Ganeshwade was introduced in the field of sports at the age of two years. From an early age, Ganeshwade followed Sachin Tendulkar and wanted to achieve greatness like the legendary cricketer.

Earlier, Aditya was a Speed skater and he was also a black belt in Taekwondo. Raju Dabhade the Secretary of the International Roll Ball Federation (IRBF) approached Aditya to try a new game known as Roll ball. Gradually he gained interest in Roll ball and was fascinated by the concept. Aditya was among the first players to play the Roll ball.

== Career ==
In Aditya's career of 17 years in roll ball, he has helped win major tournaments at national and international levels. He is nominated 7 times for the Arjuna Award.

Aditya holds the following world records:

- 12 goals in a single world cup match
- 33 goals in single world championship in the year of 2017
- 29 goals in single state level match, in the year of 2007

=== International career ===
International Roll Ball Goals
	Number of Goals
World Championship Goals	122
Asian Championship Goals	11
Total International Goals	133

International Roll Ball Medals
	Number of Medals
International Gold Medals	5
International Silver Medals	1
Total International Medals	6

=== National career ===
National Roll Ball Medals
	Number of Medals
National Gold Medals	12
National Silver Medals	4
Total National Medals	16
