= Netherlands national rollball team =

- Nickname(s): Oranje (Orange)
- Head coach: (India) Vishwaraj Jadeja
- Assistants: (Netherlands) Kim Walravens

First international
- Netherlands 1 – 1 Nepal (Pune, India; 17 April 2011)

Biggest win
- Netherlands 12 – 5 Malaysia (Pune, India; 18 April 2011)

Biggest defeat
- Netherlands 2 – 6 Belarus (Pune, India; 19 April 2011)

Rollball World Cup
- Appearances: 2 (first in 2011)
- Best result: 9th

The Netherlands national rollball team is the national men's roll ball team of the Netherlands.

The Netherlands competed in the 2011 Roll Ball World Cup where they finished 9th and won the fair play award. Four years later they also competed at the 2015 Rollball World Cup.

== Interlands ==
=== Friendly match ===
17 April 2011
Team 1	Score	Team 2
Nepal	1–1	Netherlands

=== 2011 Roll Ball World Cup ===
18 April 2011: first poule match
Team 1	Score	Team 2
Netherlands	12–5	Malaysia
18 April 2011: second poule match
Team 1	Score	Team 2
Netherlands	4–5 (3-1)	Nepal
19 April 2011: third poule match
Team 1	Score	Team 2
Netherlands	2–6 (1-2)	Belarus

Due to food poisoning Chris Bres, the goal keeper, could not play all the matches.

=== 2015 Rollball World Cup ===
16 December 2015: first poule match
Team 1	Score	Team 2
Netherlands	3-4 (0-4)	Sri Lanka
17 December 2015: second poule match
Team 1	Score	Team 2
Netherlands	3-5; 3-2	England
17 December 2015: third poule match
Team 1	Score	Team 2
Netherlands		Singapore

== Rosters ==
=== 2011 Roll Ball World Cup roster ===
- Chris Bres (G)
- Gustaaf Dekking
- Sander van Ginkel
- Rick Henneveld
- Thomas Kempen
- Niek Rosens (C)

=== 2015 Roll Ball World Cup roster ===
- 1 – Thomas Ebben (G)
- 3 – Casper Adrien
- 4 – Sander van Ginkel (C)
- 5 – Rigard van Klooster
- 30 – Roy Mulder
- 63 – Thijs Rooimans
