= Colombo Lions =

American football team in Sri Lanka

- Founded: 2011; 15 years ago
- League: EFLI
- Based in: Colombo, Western Province, Sri Lanka
- Stadium: Sugathadasa Stadium, 25,000 capacity
- Colors: Burgundy, Gold, Black
- Head coach: TBD
- Website: EFLI Sri Lanka

The Colombo Lions are a professional American football team based in Colombo, Sri Lanka. The Lions are one of the first eight franchises of the Elite Football League of India (EFLI) and compete in its inaugural season in 2012 as a member of the East Division, where they finished as semi-finalists.

The Colombo Lions play at 25,000 capacity Sugathadasa Stadium. The team is led by Dilroy Fernando, a one-time rugby union player and COO of EFLI's Sri Lankan efforts. The team's management have selected their 45-man roster, formed a company for operations and expect that the salaries paid to players will surpass that of Sri Lankan rugby players while rivaling contracts offered by cricket teams.
