= Pakistan Wolfpak =

- Founded: 2011
- League: EFLI
- Based in: Peshawar, Khyber Pakhtunkhwa, Pakistan
- Stadium: Wolfpak Stadium, 1,000 capacity
- Colors: Green, Black, White, Silver
- Head coach: TBD

The Pakistan Wolfpak are a professional American football team based in Peshawar, Pakistan. The Wolfpaks are one of the first eight franchises of the Elite Football League of India (EFLI) and compete in its inaugural season in 2012 as a member of the West Division.

It is also the first ever American football team in Pakistan.
