= Bangalore Warhawks =

- Founded: 2011
- League: EFLI
- Based in: Bangalore, Karnataka, India
- Stadium: Warhawks Stadium, 2,000 capacity
- Colors: Black, Burgundy, Gold
- Head coach: TBD

The Bangalore Warhawks were a professional American football team based in Bangalore, India. The Warhawks were one of the first eight franchises of the Elite Football League of India (EFLI) and compete in its inaugural season in 2012 as a member of the West Division, where they finished as semi-finalists.

The team was originally slated to play in Bhubaneshwar, but officials have since moved the franchise. The team is owned by Buffalo Bills player Mario Williams.
