= Hyderabad Skykings =

Former Indian American Football team

- Nickname: The Kings
- Founded: 2011
- League: Elite Football League of India
- Based in: Hyderabad, Telangana, India
- Stadium: Gachibowli Stadium, 30,000-capacity (Skykings use various stadiums for home games, like all EFL clubs)
- Colors: Cerulean Blue, Supernova Gold, Black, White
- Owner: Venkatesh Movva
- Head coach: Praveen Kumar Reddy Chintala
- Website: www.hyderabadskykings.com

The Hyderabad Skykings were a professional American football team based in Hyderabad, India. They were members of the East Division in the Elite Football League of India.

Originally based in Kandy, Sri Lanka and called the Kandy Skykings, the team formally joined the league in 2011 and began play in the 2012 season.

== Current roster ==
Hyderabad Skykings roster
Quarterbacks: 15 Ronit Banda; Running backs: 44 Sandeep Reddy Pothireddy; 27 Santhosh Sandri; Wide receivers: 18 Veera Manikanta Reddy Gade; 22 R P Raja; 81 Sudheer Yadav B; 10 Roshan Naidu; 84 Avaneesh Penumarthi; 11 Rahul Dev; 7 Laxmi Narayana; 75 Tarun Raj	Offensive linemen: 67 Mohammed Khan; 78 Santhosh Sarang; 79 Abhinav Yadavalli; 56 Sai Ganesh Adabala; Defensive linemen: 62 Manoj Darshan Racherla; 64 Srikar Reddy G; 69 Ravi Kiran P; 53 Abhinay Sira; 63 Rakesh Kumar K; 51 Sudheer Goud	Linebackers: 58 Paramesh M; 52 Prashanth Reddy Suram; 99 Naveen Kumar Kunku; Defensive backs: 54 Santhosh Yerrabolu; 59 Ketan Joga; 36 Manohar S; 77 Sarath Banoth; 52 Kartheek K; 22 R P Raja; 28 Vinay Preetham P; 83 Wasim Akaram Md; 25 Suraj Shinde; 02 Vijay; 50 Khannaya; 95 Shiva Guturu

== Coaches ==
=== Head coaches ===
Praveen Kumar Reddy Chintala, Hyderabad

== 2012 season ==
By the end of the regular season the Skykings were placed third in the east division.

=== Roster ===
Kandy Skykings roster
Quarterbacks: 16 Dulik Bandara; 15 Kanishka Konara; Running backs: 21 Nimesh Ediriweera; 29 Chathura Piyasena; 22 Sameera Senanayake; Wide receivers: 81 Yohan Arsarathna; 8 Malinga Godigamuwa; 85 Ashan Jayasekara; 89 Disham Jayasekara; 80 Ranil Perera; 25 Dunanjaya Samaradiwakara; 1 Kasun Waduge	Offensive linemen: 56 Chamika Abeykoon; 75 Kavinda Bakmeedeniya; 68 Ananda Bandara; 92 Thurshara Indrajith; 55 Pradeep Karunathilaka; 65 Suranga Priydharshana; Defensive linemen: 83 Janaka Bandara; 97 Dinender Dassanayake; 67 Percy Gunarathne; 95 Geethanjana Madushanka; 93 Amith Siriwardana	Linebackers: 45 Akila Amarathunga; 11 Nevin Jayasinghe; 37 Mohomad Rizvi; 43 Chetetya Wadugodapitiya; 40 Thusan Wimalasiri; Defensive backs: 26 Layan Chathuranga; 7 Dikshan Cramera; 24 Supun Dissanayake; 9 Dilum Jayaweera; 27 Sahan Sahanpriya
