= 2012 Elite Football League of India season =

The 2012 Elite Football League of India season or 2012 EFLI season was the debut season of Elite Football League of India and began on 22 September 2012. Eight franchises contested for the Elite Bowl, among whom five located in India, two in Sri Lanka and one in Pakistan.

The Pune Marathas claimed the title after defeating Delhi Defenders 6–0 in the Elite Bowl I on 10 November 2012 and became the first ever champions of an Elite Bowl.

== Broadcasting ==
Games were shown on Ten Sports and Ten Action with four matches per week on Saturday, Sunday, Monday and Tuesday.

== Teams ==
EFLI teams in 2012 season
| India | Pakistan | Sri Lanka |
|---|---|---|
| Location of EFLI teams in India | Location of EFLI teams in Pakistan | Location of EFLI teams in Sri Lanka |

| Team | City/State | Stadium | Founded | Joined |
East division
| Colombo Lions | Colombo, Western Province (LKA) | Sugathadasa Stadium | 2011 | |
| Delhi Defenders | Delhi, Capital Territory | Defenders Ground | 2011 | |
| Kandy Skykings | Kandy, Central Province (LKA) | Skykings Ground | 2011 | |
| Kolkata Vipers | Kolkata, West Bengal | Vipers Ground | 2011 | |
West division
| Bangalore Warhawks | Bangalore, Karnataka | Warhawks Ground | 2011 | |
| Mumbai Gladiators | Mumbai, Maharashtra | Cooperage Ground | 2011 | |
| Pakistan Wolfpak | Peshawar, Khyber Pakhtunkhwa (PAK) | Wolfpak Ground | 2011 | |
| Pune Marathas | Pune, Maharashtra | Balewadi Stadium | 2011 | |

== Venues ==
Sri Lanka
Colombo
Sugathadasa Stadium
Capacity: 30,000
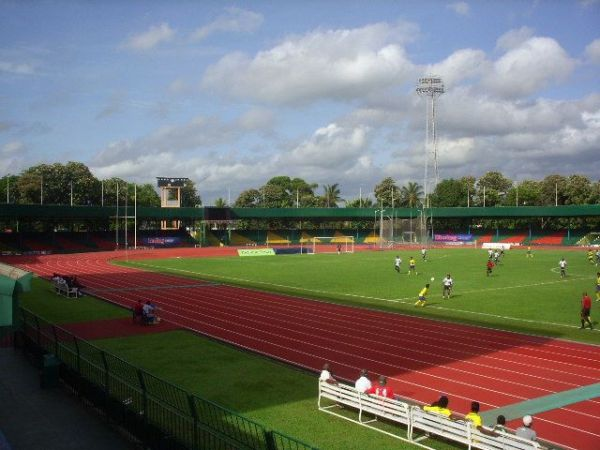

== Regular season ==
=== Standings ===
East

| Team | GP | W | L | Pct | PF | PA | NP |
|---|---|---|---|---|---|---|---|
| Colombo Lions | 5 | 4 | 1 | 0.800 | 64 | 35 | +29 |
| Delhi Defenders | 6 | 4 | 2 | 0.667 | 96 | 55 | +41 |
| Kandy Skykings | 6 | 2 | 4 | 0.333 | 55 | 92 | -37 |
| Kolkata Vipers | 6 | 0 | 6 | 0.000 | 15 | 104 | -90 |

West

| Team | GP | W | L | Pct | PF | PA | NP |
|---|---|---|---|---|---|---|---|
| Pune Marathas | 6 | 4 | 2 | 0.667 | 88 | 42 | +46 |
| Bangalore Warhawks | 6 | 4 | 2 | 0.667 | 84 | 44 | +40 |
| Mumbai Gladiators | 6 | 4 | 2 | 0.667 | 67 | 45 | +22 |
| Pakistan Wolfpak | 5 | 1 | 4 | 0.200 | 38 | 91 | -53 |

- Advanced to the Elite Bowl Qualifier

=== Fixtures ===
Following a complete list with results.

| Game | Date / Time (IST) | Home Team | Score | Away Team | Location |
|---|---|---|---|---|---|
| 1 | 22 SEP / 8:30 PM | Bangalore Warhawks | 26–06 | Pakistan Wolfpak | Sugathadasa Stadium |
| 2 | 23 SEP / 8:30 PM | Pune Marathas | 31–07 | Delhi Defenders | Sugathadasa Stadium |
| 3 | 24 SEP / 8:30 PM | Kandy Skykings | 13–00 | Kolkata Vipers | Sugathadasa Stadium |
| 4 | 25 SEP / 8:30 PM | Mumbai Gladiators | 07–12 | Colombo Lions | Sugathadasa Stadium |
| 5 | 29 SEP / 8:30 PM | Pune Marathas | 16–06 | Kolkata Vipers | Sugathadasa Stadium |
| 6 | 30 SEP / 8:30 PM | Pakistan Wolfpak | 12–14 | Mumbai Gladiators | Sugathadasa Stadium |
| 7 | 01 OCT / 8:30 PM | Bangalore Warhawks | 10–07 | Colombo Lions | Sugathadasa Stadium |
| 8 | 02 OCT / 8:30 PM | Delhi Defenders | 43–06 | Kandy Skykings | Sugathadasa Stadium |
| 9 | 06 OCT / 8:30 PM | Bangalore Warhawks | 07–10 | Pune Marathas | Sugathadasa Stadium |
| 10 | 07 OCT / 8:30 PM | Kolkata Vipers | 06–26 | Colombo Lions | Sugathadasa Stadium |
| 11 | 08 OCT / 8:30 PM | Pakistan Wolfpak | 00–21 | Delhi Defenders | Sugathadasa Stadium |
| 12 | 09 OCT / 8:30 PM | Kandy Skykings | 03–11 | Mumbai Gladiators | Sugathadasa Stadium |
| 13 | 13 OCT / 8:30 PM | Pune Marathas | 06–13 | Mumbai Gladiators | Sugathadasa Stadium |
| 14 | 14 OCT / 8:30 PM | Pakistan Wolfpak | 14–03 | Kolkata Vipers | Sugathadasa Stadium |
| 15 | 15 OCT / 8:30 PM | Bangalore Warhawks | 13–06 | Kandy Skykings | Sugathadasa Stadium |
| 16 | 16 OCT / 8:30 PM | Delhi Defenders | 06–10 | Colombo Lions | Sugathadasa Stadium |
| 17 | 20 OCT / 8:30 PM | Pakistan Wolfpak | Cancelled | Colombo Lions | Sugathadasa Stadium |
| 17 | 20 OCT / 8:30 PM | Delhi Defenders | 07–00 | Kolkata Vipers | Sugathadasa Stadium |
| 18 | 21 OCT / 8:30 PM | Bangalore Warhawks | 00–15 | Mumbai Gladiators | Sugathadasa Stadium |
| 19 | 22 OCT / 8:30 PM | Pune Marathas | 19–00 | Kandy Skykings | Sugathadasa Stadium |
| 20 | 27 OCT / 8:30 PM | Bangalore Warhawks | 28–00 | Kolkata Vipers | Sugathadasa Stadium |
| 21 | 28 OCT / 8:30 PM | Pune Marathas | 06–09 | Colombo Lions | Sugathadasa Stadium |
| 22 | 29 OCT / 8:30 PM | Delhi Defenders | 12–07 | Mumbai Gladiators | Sugathadasa Stadium |
| 23 | 30 OCT / 8:30 PM | Pakistan Wolfpak | 06–27 | Kandy Skykings | Sugathadasa Stadium |

== Playoffs ==
=== Elite Bowl Qualifier ===
| Game | Date / Time (IST) | Winning Team | Score | Losing Team | Location |
|---|---|---|---|---|---|
| 24 | 03 NOV / 8:30 PM | Delhi Defenders | 22–14 | Bangalore Warhawks | Sugathadasa Stadium |
| 25 | 04 NOV / 8:30 PM | Pune Marathas | 21–07 | Colombo Lions | Sugathadasa Stadium |

=== Elite Bowl I ===
| Game | Date / Time (IST) | Winning Team | Score | Losing Team | Location |
|---|---|---|---|---|---|
| 26 | 10 NOV / 8:30 PM | Pune Marathas | 06–00 | Delhi Defenders | Sugathadasa Stadium |

== Awards ==
Roshan Lobo, a running back of the Warhawks, was named MVP of the season.
