= National Institute of Construction Management and Research =

Indian educational institution

NICMAR University
- Established: 1982
- Affiliations: UGC
- Chairman: Ajit Gulabchand
- President: Anil Kashyap
- Location: Pune, Maharashtra, India; 18°34′26″N 73°46′00″E
- Nickname: NICMAR
- Website: Official Web Site

NICMAR University, also known as the National Institute of Construction Management and Research (NICMAR), is a higher education provider and a pioneer in techno-managerial studies in India.

NICMAR University is recognized as a state-private university by the UGC. NICMAR University Pune Act (L. C. Bill No. Of 2022) was passed by the Maharashtra State Government on 16 March 2022 and appeared in the “Maharashtra Government Gazette” on 12 May 2022 (Mah. Act No. XXXVI of 2022). The institution is now recognized by the government, ministry, and various state departments.

== Profile ==
NICMAR was founded in 1982 as a result of a joint effort by a group of major construction companies in India headed by Hindustan Construction Company (HCC), whose Chairman, Ajit Gulabchand, put forth the idea of setting up an advanced research center in construction management. HCC contributed ₹30,000,000 towards the setting up of the proposed institute. The result was the establishment of the institute with headquarters at Walchand Centre, Tardeo in Mumbai.

In 1990, NICMAR was accredited by the Department of Scientific and Industrial Research, Ministry of Science and Technology as a Scientific and Industrial Research Organization (SIRO). Advanced Construction Management Program, a higher studies program conducted by NICMAR in association with the Massachusetts Institute of Technology, International Labour Organization, and Indian Institute of Management, Ahmedabad is considered to be a premium education program by the industry. The program is funded by UNDP and has visiting faculty from MIT, the University of Michigan, the University of Loughborough, and IIMA as per agreements with the respective organizations.

== Facilities ==
NICMAR maintains a library at its main campus in Pune which stocks more than 40,000 printed materials. It also keeps references on national and international standards such as Bureau of Indian Standards, Indian Roads Congress, International Federation of Consulting Engineers, Geneva, (FIDIC) and International Labour Organization, Geneva.

The collections include 25,000 books and theses, 10,000 bound volumes of journals and 5,000 e-references in the form of compact discs. It also subscribes to 79 periodicals and 9 newspapers such as Proquest ABI Inform, ebrary-Business and Economics, ASCE Journals, SCIENCEDIRECT – Business, Management and Accounting, Sage Journals, and CMIE.

The other infrastructural facilities include classrooms, computer labs, conference halls, auditorium, open air theatre, student's hostel, executive hostel, dining facility, indoor and outdoor sports and Wi-Fi facility.

== Associations and collaborations ==
NICMAR has entered into collaborative associations with:

- Knowledge Partnership: With The Economic Times, Construction Week magazine and CREDAI
- NICMAR is associated with Bentley Education
- NICMAR is associated with Construction World magazine for recognizing excellence of construction companies based on a rating program developed by NICMAR, called Construction World NICMAR Award, in the field of construction.
- PMI Organisation Centre Private Limited, a subsidiary of Project Management Institute (PMI), has awarded two scholarships to the best students at NICMAR.
- NICMAR is an alliance member of the Microsoft Dynamics Academic Alliance for the use of Microsoft ERP programs and has set up a Construction ERP laboratory in Pune campus, known to be the first of its kind in India.
- NICMAR utilises the services of the Construction Computer Software (CCS), South Africa, for project estimation and control by way of CANDY, an industry specific software developed by CCS.
- Palisade EMEA and India, a subsidiary of Palisade Corporation, UK, is a software partner of NICMAR for the use of Decision Tools Suite Industrial, an ERP software for risk analysis.

== Courses ==
NICMAR's raison d'etre is to relentlessly strive to create the professionally educated engineering, managerial and leadership talent, in a sector that is rather starved of such high level talent.

NICMAR offers several MBA & post graduate level courses in the field of project engineering and construction management, Real Estate, Infrastructure, and Project Management areas. It also conducts short, medium and long term programs for executive development, primarily aimed at construction industry. The longer duration programs are based at Pune and Hyderabad campuses. At the end of every year, it invites application for all its courses.

- MBA in Advanced Construction Management (ACM)
- MBA in Advanced Project Management (APM)
- Integrated Masters of Business Administration (I-MBA), spread across ten semesters over a period of five years.
- Postgraduate Diploma in Management of Family-owned Construction Business (PGD MFOCB)
- Postgraduate Diploma in Quantity Surveying and Construction Management (PGD QSCM)
- MBA in Real Estate and Urban Infrastructure Management (MBA REUIM)
- Executive Education

=== Distance Education ===
NICMAR offers various programs by distance education mode. The courses were discontinued in January 2018 after the November 2017 Supreme Court ruling that technical education cannot be provided through distance learning or correspondence courses.

Two year post graduate distance education programs

- Post Graduate Program in Construction Management (PGP CM)
- Post Graduate Program in Project Management (PGP PM)
- Post Graduate Program in Infrastructure Development and Management (PGP IDM)
- Post Graduate Program in Construction Business Management (PGP CBM)
- Post Graduate Program in Real Estate Management (PGP REM)
- Post Graduate Program in Quantity Surveying (PGP QS)
- Post Graduate Program in Health, Safety and Environment Management (PGP HSEM)

One year part time weekend post graduate programs

- Post Graduate Program in Quantity Surveying and Contract Management (PGP QSCM)
- Post Graduate Program in Construction Management for Working Executives (PGP CMWE)
- Post Graduate Program in Project Management for Working Executives (PGP PMWE)
- Post Graduate Program in Facilities Management for Working Executives (PGP FMWE)

Graduate programs

- Graduate Program in Construction Project Management (GP PM)
- Graduate Program in Construction Business Management (GP CBM)
- Graduate Program in Construction Safety Management (GP CSM)
- Graduate Program in Construction Quantity Surveying (GP QS)
- Graduate Program in Power Sector Project Management (GP PSPM)
- Graduate Program in Contract Administration and Dispute Management (GP CADM)

Undergraduate Programs

• B.Tech Civil Engineering

• Bachelor of Architecture

== Centres ==
National Institute of Construction Management and Research
- Interactive map of the National Institute of Construction Management and Research area

General information
- Coordinates: 18.57417796391416°N 73.76858137478602°E

=== NICMAR PUNE Campus ===
The campus of NICMAR Pune is at Balewadi, Pune, along the Mumbai-Bangalore Expressway, on a land measuring 11 acres of land, with a total built up area of 377,676 sq ft. The campus hosts the administration and faculty offices, various classrooms, library, computer centre, dining hall, auditorium and a documentation centre. It also provides facilities such as medical clinic, community hall and indoor and outdoor recreational areas.

=== NICMAR HYDERABAD Campus ===
NICMAR Hyderabad (Shamirpet) campus is situated at Shamirpet, 30 kilometres away from the Secunderabad Railway Station and 7 kilometres from Ratnalayam Temple, which is on the Karimnagar highway. It has over 334,609 sq ft of built-up area on a 31.46-acre plot of land.

== Publications ==
The Institute publishes a periodical, Journal of Construction Management (ISSN 0970-3675) for dissemination of information on modern technologies in construction management.

- NICMAR. Journal of Construction Management. NICMAR. OCLC 51052980.

== See also ==
- Construction engineering
- Construction management
