= Maha Roll Ball League =

World's first professional roll ball league in Maharashtra, India

- Current season, competition or edition: 2017 Maha Roll Ball League season
- Sport: Roll Ball
- Founded: 2016
- First season: 2016
- No. of teams: Boys - 8, Girls - 6
- Country: India
- Venue: Andheri Sports Complex
- Most recent champions: Raigad Titans(Boys) and Laling Legends(Girls)
- Most titles: Raigad Titans(Boys) and Laling Legends(Girls)(1 title each)
- Website: www.rollball.info/league.html

Maha Roll Ball League (MRBL) is the world's first professional roll ball league organized by Maharashtra Roll Ball Federation in Maharashtra, India. The main aim of the MRBL is to promote the sport of roll ball, with the ultimate goal of its inclusion in the Olympics by getting professionals teams into the game. Raigad Titans and Laling Legends were crowned inaugural champions of Maha Roll Ball League in Boys' and Girls' category respectively in Pune.

== 2016 ==
MRBL 2016 was the inaugural season of the league played during 28–30 May 2016 in New English School, Tilak Road, Pune. Raigad Titans beat Rajgad Yoddhas and Laling Legends beat Panhala Warriors to win MRBL 2016 in the boys' and girls' category, respectively.

Boys' Team: Shivneri Lions, Sindhudurg Dynamites, Raigad Titans, Devgiri Panther, Vishalgad Warriors, Ramsej Rangers, Rajgad Yoddhas, Ramtek Callengers

Girls' Team: Arnala Royals, Laling Legends, Nalderg Fighters, Panhala Warriors

The players of Boys' team 1. Jay sadekar (captain) 2. Harsh goyanka (goalkeeper)

== 2017 ==
In 2017 MRBL was revamped with completely new set of team franchises, foreign players and Indian Premier League (IPL) style opening ceremony and player auction. The player auction was conducted in Pune on 4 June 2017. Initially the league was scheduled to be played during 3–6 June; this was postponed to 23–26 June, with a shift in venue from Andheri Sports Complex, Mumbai, to Balewadi Stadium, Pune.
