= Delhi Defenders =

American Football team from Delhi, India

- Founded: 2011
- League: EFLI
- Based in: Delhi, Capital Territory, India
- Stadium: Defenders Stadium, 1,000 capacity
- Colors: Royal Blue, Gold, Black
- Head coach: Adesh Kumar
- Website: delhidefenders.in

The Delhi Defenders are a professional American football team based in Delhi, India. The Defenders are one of the first eight franchises of the Elite Football League of India (EFLI) and compete in its inaugural season in 2012 as a member of the East Division, where they finished as runners-up after a successful qualifying for the Elite Bowl I.
