= Kolkata Vipers =

American football team based in Kolkata, India

- Founded: 2011
- League: EFLI
- Based in: Kolkata, West Bengal, India
- Stadium: Vipers Stadium, 1,000 capacity
- Colors: Purple, Gold, Dark Green, White
- Head coach: TBD

The Kolkata Vipers are a professional American football team based in Kolkata, India. The Vipers are one of the first eight franchises of the Elite Football League of India (EFLI) and compete in its inaugural season in 2012 as a member of the East Division.
