= Pune Marathas (American football) =

American football team based in Pune, India

- Founded: 2011
- League: EFLI
- Based in: Pune, Maharashtra, India
- Stadium: Balewadi Stadium, 11,900 capacity (Pune Marathas use various stadiums for home games, like all EFL clubs)
- Colors: Burgundy, Navy Blue, Silver, Gold
- Head coach: TBD
- Website: http://www.punemarathas.in/

The Pune Marathas are a professional American football team based in Pune, India. The Marathas are one of the first eight franchises of the Elite Football League of India (EFLI) and compete in its inaugural season in 2012 as a member of the West Division, where they became the first ever champions of an Elite Bowl.

The training sessions was a five-week training camp led by former NFL player and Arena Football League coach Doug Plank.

The team's debut match incidentally is the league's first match as well. The Marathas began their season by playing against the Mumbai Gladiators in November 2012.
