= Hiranna Nimal =

Indian field hockey player

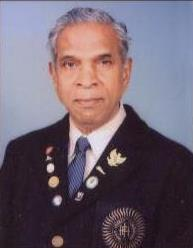

Personal information
- Born: 20 August 1935
- Died: 14 June 2010 (aged 74) Mumbai, Maharashtra, India

Sport
- Sport: Field hockey
National team
Years	Team	Caps	Goals
–	India		-
Medal record
Representing India
Men's field hockey
Asian Games
Silver medal – second place	1962 Jakarta	Team

Hiranna M. Nimal (20 August 1935 – 14 June 2010) was an Indian field hockey player from Maharashtra.

== Family ==
Hiranna Nimal came from a family of field hockey players. He was the son of Mogalanna Nimal. He was born and brought up in Pune and later moved to Mumbai in 1957.

== Career ==
=== International level ===
1957 Represented Indian Camp for Moscow Youth Festival.

1958 Represented I.H.F. for all India Tour.

1959 Represented India for East Africa Tour, WINNER.

1959 Represented Indian Hockey Camp for Europe Tour.

1960 Represented India Camp for I.H.F. Presidents Eleven for Rome Olympics.

1961 Represented Maharashtra state for Ceylon Tour, Gold Medal.

1962 Represented India for International Hockey Tournament held at Ahmedabad, WINNER.

1962 Represented India for Tours of Malaysia and Singapore, WINNER.

1962 Represented (IV) 1962 Asian Games, Jakarta, Indonesia, SILVER MEDALIST.

=== National level ===
1953–1956, Represented Maharashtra state for National Hockey Championship, three consecutive years. Winners.

1956 Represented Maharashtra as captain of Junior Team in the National Hockey Championship. Winners.

1956 Represented Kirkeeans for Maharashtra League Championship. Winners.

1956 Represented Poona Police Hockey Team for D.J.Spencer Cup. Runner-up.

1957 Represented Indian Railways in for Dhyanchand Memorial Hockey Tournament held at Delhi. Runner-up.

1957 Represented Asian Railway Games – Delhi.

1958 Represented Western Railway for Aga Khan Tournament. Winner.

1958 Represented Indian Railways for Rangaswami Cup. Winner.

1959 Represented Western Railway for 25th National Hockey Championship organized by "Railway Sports Control Board"

1957–1966 Represented National Tournaments held by Indian Railways.

1962 Represented Western Railways for Home Ministers Cup. Winner.

1962–64 Represented Western Rly. As captain of Hockey Team.

1957–66 Member of Indian Railways Hockey Team.

1965 Represented Bombay XI in Nehru Memorial Hockey Tournament held at Delhi. Winner.

In 1965 while Nimal was playing domestic tournament against Tata Sports Club he suffered a complex Fracture of his left hand, which was a major blow to his career, but he continued playing.

1966 Represented Indian Railways for National Hockey Championship held at Pune. Winner.

1970 Represented Western Rly. For 75th Beighton Cup. Winner.

1970 Represented Western Rly. For Inter Railway Hockey Tournament. Runner-up.

=== Appointments on Ad Hoc Committee ===
1977 Member of selection committee of Indian Railways Hockey Board

1977 Manager of Junior team of Indian Railways for National Championship held at Madras. Appointed as coach of Maharashtra state.

1991 Manager for Indian Railways women's Hockey Team for Gangotri Devi All India Hockey Tournament held at Gorakhpur. Winners.

=== Legacy ===
Nimal played primarily as a left half and was active in competitive field hockey for approximately 17 years. In addition to his professional career, he contributed to the development of the sport by providing voluntary coaching to schools and colleges.Obituary
