= Shree Shiv Chhatrapati Sports Complex =

Building in India

Coordinates: 18.574745°N 73.760984°E

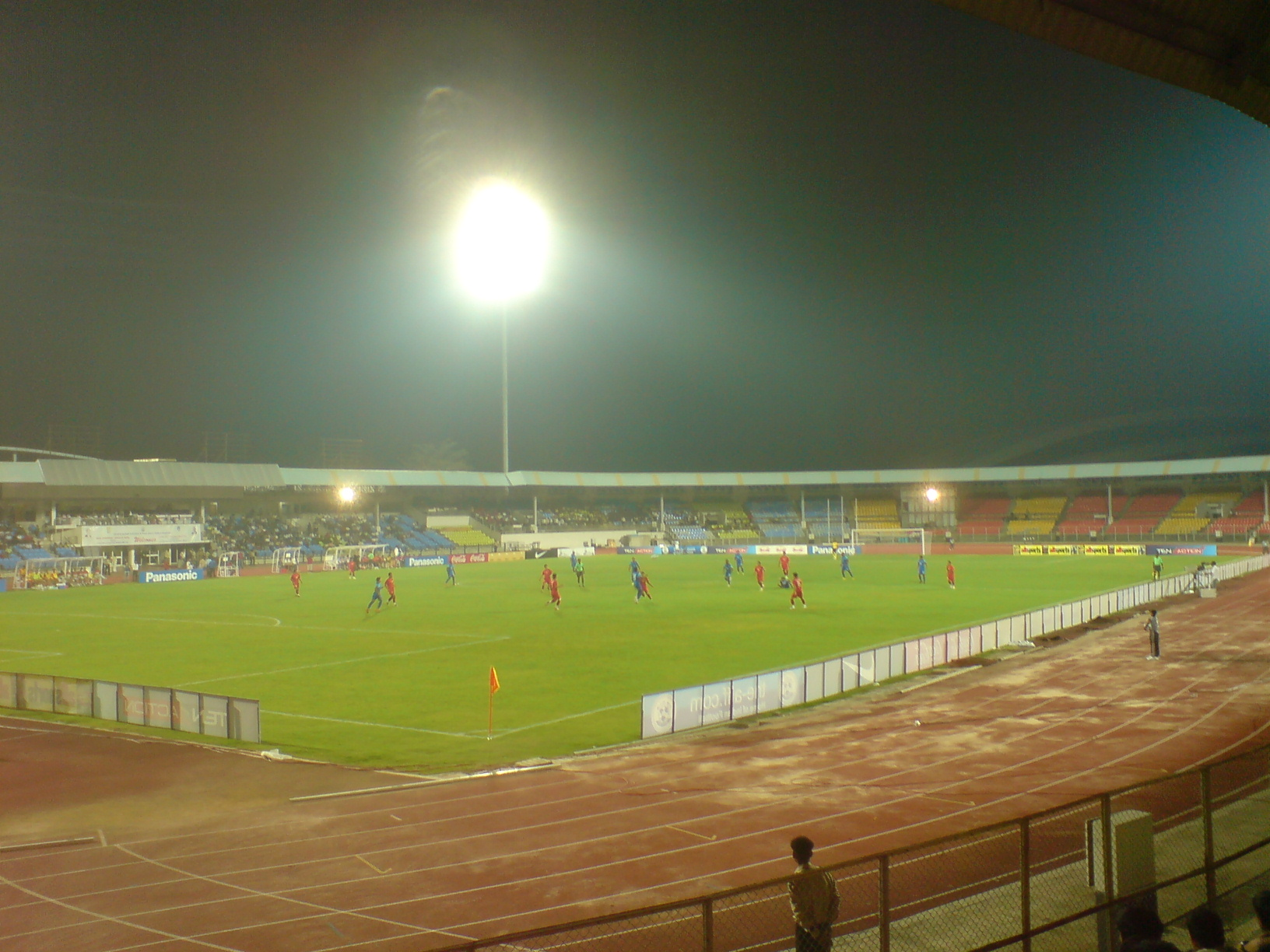
- Interactive map of Shree Shiv Chhatrapati Sports Complex
- Full name: Shree Shiv Chhatrapati Sports Complex
- Location: Mahalunge, Balewadi, Pune district, India
- Operator: Government of Maharashtra
- Capacity: 11,900
- Surface: Grass
- Scoreboard: Yes
- Field size: 100.0 M x 68.0 M

Construction
- Groundbreaking: 1992
- Built: 1994
- Opened: 1994
- Renovated: 2007, 2008

Tenants
- Air India (2011–2013); DSK Shivajians (until 2017); Pune (2009–2015); Bharat FC (2014–2015); FC Pune City (2014–2019); Puneri Paltan (2014–present)

The Shree Shiv Chhatrapati Sports Complex, also known as Balewadi Stadium, is a sports complex located in Pune, India. The complex is situated about 15 km from downtown Pune and 5 km from Hinjawadi. This complex was a venue for the 2008 Commonwealth Youth Games, Khelo India Youth Games in 2019 and AFC Women's Asian Cup.

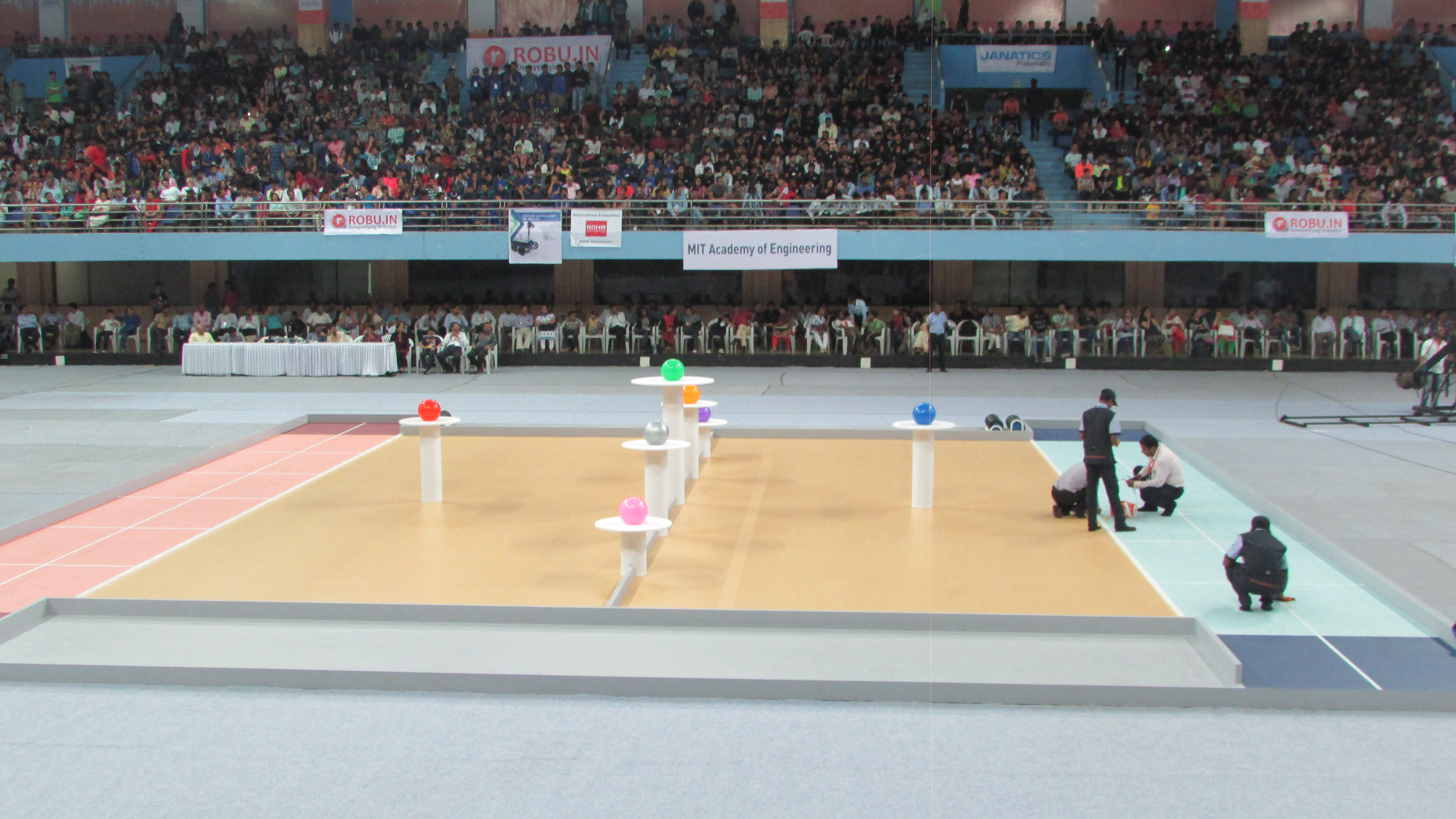
Indoor arena of Balewadi Sports Complex hosting 2017 Robocon India

== History ==
This complex was built in 1994 for the National Games 1994, which were hosted by Pune. The 2008 Commonwealth Youth Games were hosted here. In 2008 the World Junior Table Tennis Circuit was successfully held here. The 2009 FIVB Men's Junior World Championship was held here. The city also hosted FIBA Asia Under-16 Championship for Women 2009.

The second edition of the Khelo India Youth Games was kicked off in Shree Shiv Chhatrapati Sports Complex, by Sports Minister, Rajyavardhan Singh Rathore, and then Chief Minister of Maharashtra, Devendra Fadnavis.

The venue is also going to host upcoming 2022 AFC Women's Asian Cup.

Indian Super League club Mumbai City FC decided to use this arena for two of their home matches in AFC Champions League 2023 group stage.

== Other games ==
American football

Beginning in fall 2012, the Shree Shiv Chhatrapati Sports Complex Stadium underwent a retrofitting and it became the host stadium for the Elite Football League of India and the home arena for the Pune Marathas.

Rollball

The 2011 Rollball World Cup was held in this games village. This was the first world cup of Roll Ball. The Denmark national Rollball team was the winner of the tournament. Also the 3rd Roll Ball World Cup in 2015 was organized here.

Volleyball

The 2009 FIVB Men's Junior World Championship was held on 31 July 2009 to 9 August 2009. Host India ended 4th in this tournament. This tournament was conducted in Badminton Hall and Boxing Arena. Brazil won this championship.

== Facilities ==
The complex was designed by Shashi Prabhu & Associates as the venue for National Games 1995. It was later modernized in 2011 to host Youth Commonwealth Games.

=== Main Stadium ===
The Shree Shiv Chhatrapati Sports Complex Stadium has a seating capacity of roughly 11,000 people, and also has flood lights and an 8 lane track.

==== Football ====
The athletics stadium hosted matches for the India national football team. It has also hosted the I-League matches for Pune F.C. India played against Vietnam in a friendly match in 2010.

India played their first match in the 2012 London Olympic Qualifiers (first round) against Myanmar. India won the game 2–1. India then drew 1–1 with Qatar in the 2012 London Olympic Qualifier (second round) at the stadium. Then during the 2011 Indian Federation Cup the Balewadi Sports Complex co-hosted with the Salt Lake Stadium the Federation Cup group-stages. The Federation Cup is the second most important football competition in India. This stadium hosted Indian Super League for FC Pune City bought by Bollywood actor Hrithik Roshan.

==== International football matches ====
8 October 2010	India	3–1	Vietnam	Pune
	Chhetri 25', 48', 72'	Report	Vu Nhu Thanh 62'	Stadium: Shree Shiv Chhatrapati Sports Complex Stadium; Referee: Dinesh Nair (India)

23 February 2011	India u23	2–1	Myanmar u23	Pune
	Lalpekhlua; Malsawmfela		Mai Aih Naing	Stadium: Shree Shiv Chhatrapati Sports Complex Stadium

23 June 2011	India u23	1–1	Qatar u23	Pune
	Khalid Muftah o.g.		Mohammed Elneel	Stadium: Shree Shiv Chhatrapati Sports Complex Stadium

31 August 2015	India	0–0	Nepal	Pune
14:30		Report		Stadium: Shree Shiv Chhatrapati Sports Complex Stadium

==== Aquatics centre ====
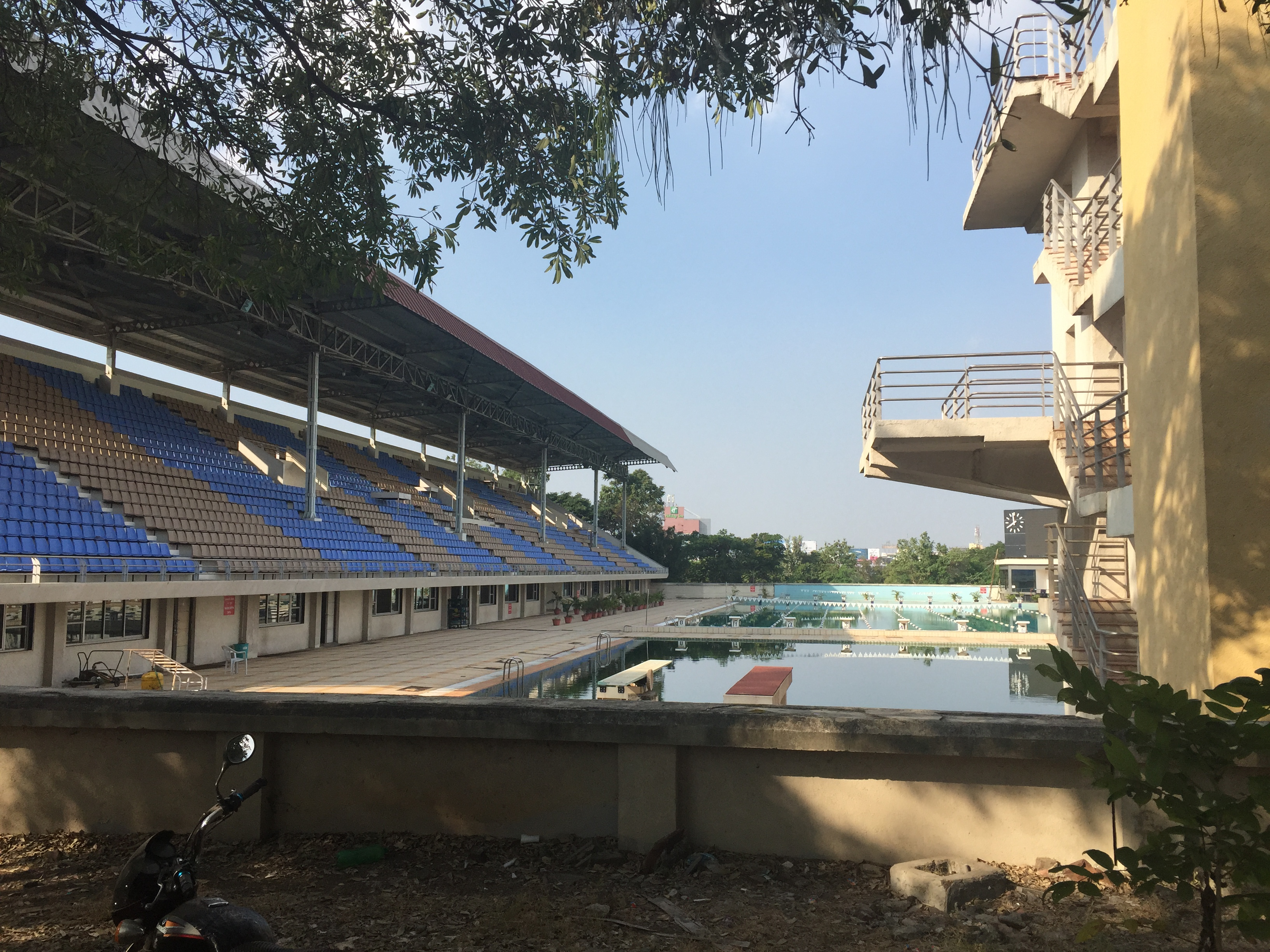
Aquatic centre

This aquatics centre contains two 50 x 25m swimming pools, with a seating capacity of 3500.

==== Badminton Hall ====
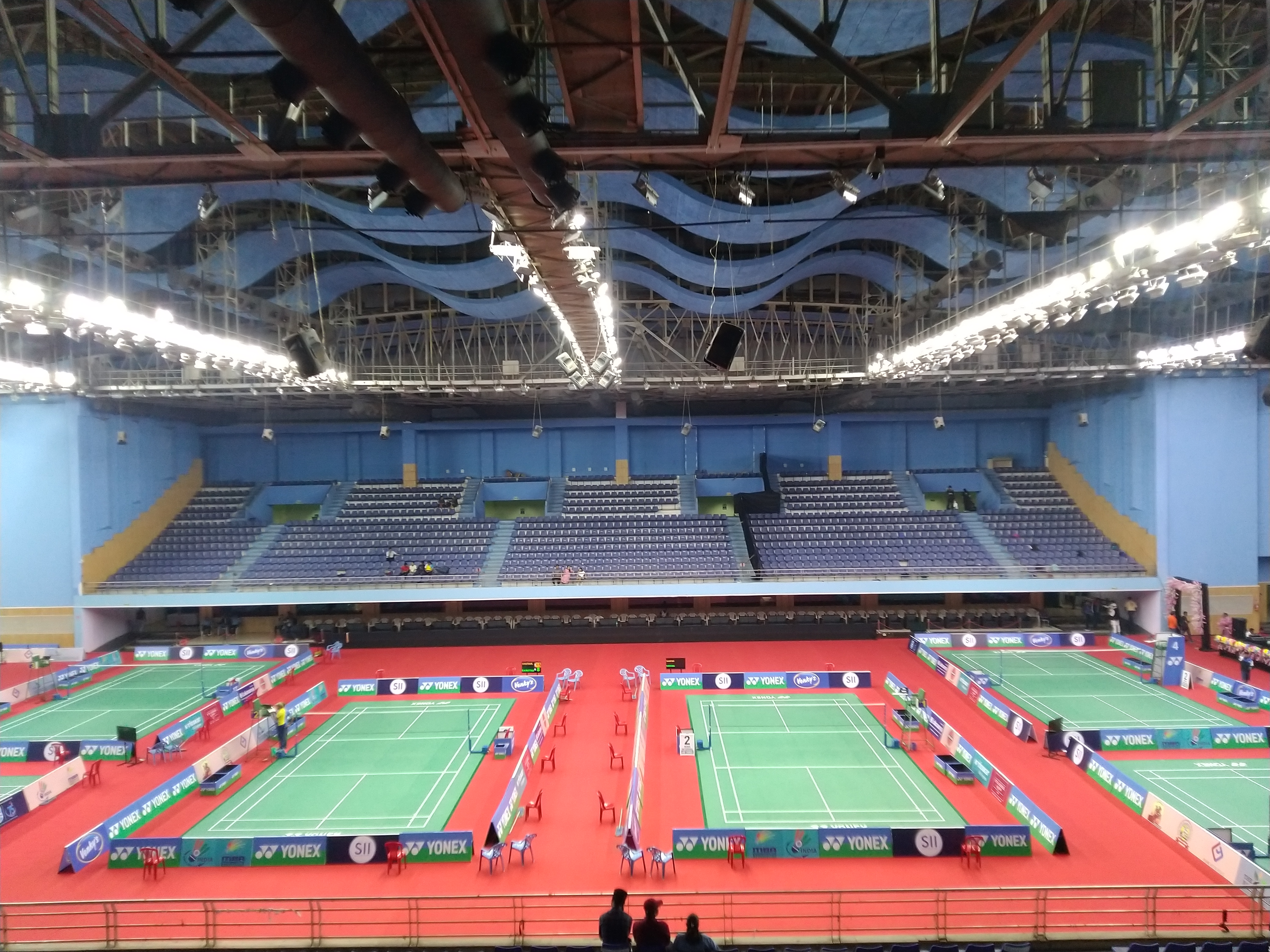
Badminton Arena

The badminton hall 6 competition courts and 4 warm-up courts, and has a seating capacity of 3800. This hall is air conditioned and has a wooden floor. It has changing rooms available and seating & lounges for VIPs. This venue is the home ground of Pune Pistons, a franchise in Indian Badminton League (IBL). So far 3 IBL matches have been played on this venue.

==== Basketball ====
The first edition of FIBA Asia Under-16 Championship for Women was played in this indoor stadium from 30 November 2009 to 6 December 2009. The host, India, finished in fifth position.

It has been a host for the UBA Pro Basketball League, India's top professional basketball division.

==== Boxing Arena ====
The boxing arena has 3 rings, and 5 warm-up rings, with a seating capacity of 3500. This hall is air conditioned and has changing rooms for players. This arena is the host of 2011 World Series Boxing.

==== Shooting Range ====
The complex has 15 shooting ranges, with a seating capacity of 1500. The ranges are constructed according to ISSF rules. Ranges 50 m, 25 m and 10 m are available

Ranges

Shooting Range	Seating Capacity	Firing points	Notes
10m Shooting Range	425	80	A/C
25m Shooting Range	425	50	Non A/C
50m Shooting Range	700	80	Non A/C
Combined Trap and Skee Shooting Range 1			Non A/C
Combined Trap and Skee Shooting Range 2			Non A/C
Combined Trap and Skee Shooting Range 3			Non A/C

==== Table Tennis Hall ====
The hall, with a seating capacity of 1500 people, successfully held World Junior Table Tennis Circuit in September 2008. This has 4 competition tables and 4 warm up tables. This hall is air conditioned and has changing rooms for players. Seating and lounges are for VIPs.

==== Tennis Court ====
The tennis courts feature one central court and four competition courts, with six warm-up courts. Centre court has a seating capacity of 4200. The stadium hosted the only South Asian ATP 250 series championship named Tata Open Maharashtra annually until 2023.

==== Weightlifting Hall ====
This hall has a capacity of 3,000. It has hosted the 2009 commonwealth bench press championships. The most famous athlete to compete was Britain's strongest man Paddy the Pac man Jumelle. The hall is air conditioned and has one competition podium and 10 warm-up platforms. Seating and lounges are provided for VIPs. There is also a changing room for competitors.

==== Wrestling Hall ====
The Shree Shiv Chhatrapati Sports Complex Wrestling Hall, which is used by Kabaddi club Puneri Paltan, has four rings, and six warm-up rings with a seating capacity of 4,400 people. This has seating and lounges for VIPs. This also has changing room for players. This is an air conditioned hall.

==== Velodrome ====
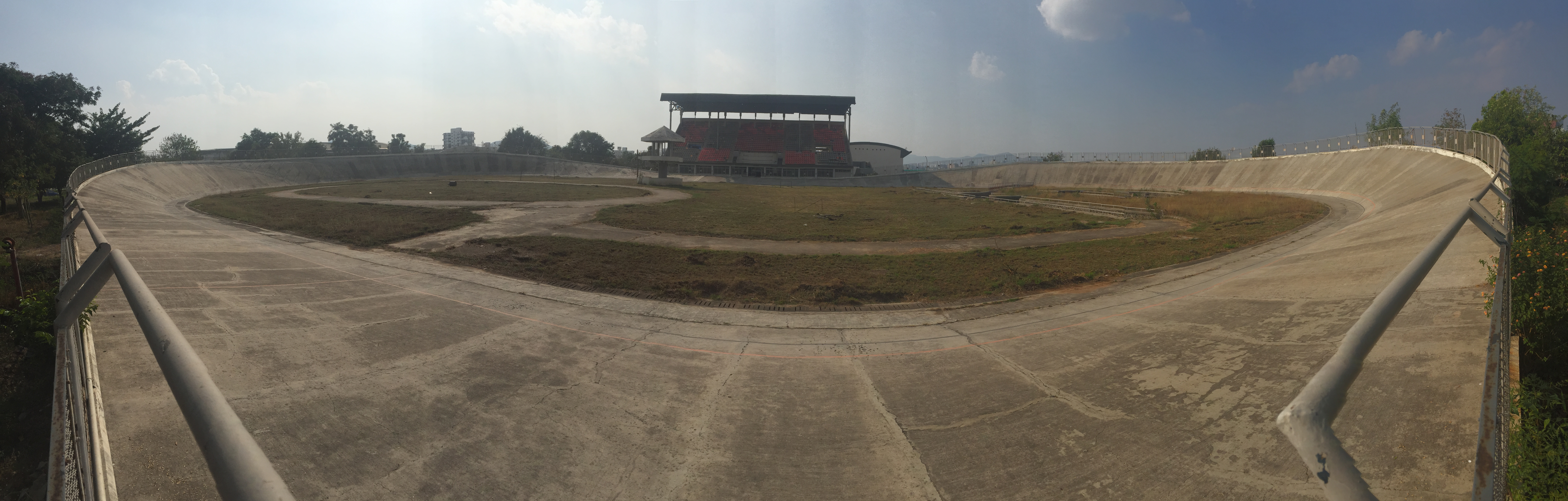
Velodrome

The 333.33 m or 1,093.6 ft velodrome is outdoor and the surface is made of concrete. While it was a prime venue for the 3rd Nationals Games in the year 1993–94 it has never been a place for any major events thereafter, and was left unused. In 2014 it was announced that with a Rs 10 crore maintenance grant from the governments for the entire complex, the facelift of the velodrome had top priority. At that time the velodrome was in dilapidated state.

=== Games village ===
This is a non-sporting venue at the sports city with 400 rooms, ranging between three and five stars.

=== Other buildings ===
The other buildings are as follows:

Cultural Centre

Fitness Centre

This centre has equipment to develop physical and physiological attributes. This hall is air condition hall and has provision for Yoga and Meditation. This has provision for sauna and chill water bath for recovery.

Sports Science Centre

This centre has sauna and chill water bath. This has seven departments:

1. Central dope collection centre.
2. Department of bio-mechanics.
3. Department of nutrition and ergogenic aids.
4. Department of physiotherapy.
5. Department of Psychology.
6. Department of sports rehabilitation.
7. Human performance and evolution laboratory.

== Teams ==
Club	Sport	League
Pune F.C.	Football	I-League
Bharat FC	Football	I-League
FC Pune City	Football	Indian Super League
Puneri Paltan	Kabaddi	Pro Kabaddi League
Pune Marathas	American football	Elite Football League of India
Mumbai City FC	Football	AFC Champions League 2023

== Tournaments ==
Major Tournaments

	Year	Tournament
1	1994	National Games of India
2	2008	World Junior Table Tennis Circuit
3	2008 (Details)	Commonwealth Youth Games
4	2009 (Details)	Men's Junior Volleyball World Championship
5	2009 (Details)	FIBA Asia Under-16 Championship for Women
6	2011 (Details)	Rollball World Cup.
7	2011	World Series Boxing
8	2013 (Details)	Asian Athletics Championships.
9	2014 (Details)	Pro Kabaddi League
10	2014 (Details)	Rollball
11	2019	Khelo India Youth Games
12	2022 (Details)	AFC Women's Asian Cup 2022
13	2022 (Details)	ATP 250 Maharashtra Open

Professional Leagues and Cups

	Sport	Team	League	Seasons	Matches Played
1	American football	Pune Marathas	Elite Football League of India	2012–13	0
2	Badminton	Pune Pistons	Indian Badminton League	2013	3
4	Football	Pune	I-League	2009–10, 2010–11, 2011–12, 2012–13, 2013–14	89
3	Football	FC Pune City	Indian Super League	2014, 2015 with semi-finals.	15
5	Football	Group A and Group B	Indian Federation Cup	2011	7
6	Kabaddi	Puneri Paltan	Pro Kabaddi League	2014, 2015	7

== International Sports University, Maharashtra ==
In 2020, Maharashtra passed a bill to establish a university named International Sports University, Maharashtra. For this, Pune's Balewadi-based Shree Shiv Chhatrapati Sports Complex will be upgraded to upcoming sports university. University will start functioning in 2021–22.

== Other uses ==
=== Filmset ===
Several scenes for the 2016 film Dangal were filmed at this sports complex in December 2015. The film is about two Indian daughters who won the gold and silver medal in wrestling at the 2010 Commonwealth Games.

== See also ==
- Lists of stadiums

Preceded by Kobe Universiade Memorial Stadium; Kobe	Asian Athletics Championships; Venue; 2013	Succeeded by TBA
Preceded by doesn't exist	Rollball World Cup; 2011	Succeeded by Moi International Sports Complex; Kasarani
