= Mumbai Gladiators =

- Founded: 2011
- League: EFLI
- Based in: Mumbai, Maharashtra, India
- Stadium: Cooperage Stadium, 5,000 capacity
- Colors: Black, Red, Silver, White, Yellow
- Head coach: Mark Philmore

The Mumbai Gladiators are a professional American football team based in Mumbai, India. The Gladiators are one of the first eight franchises of the Elite Football League of India (EFLI) and, as of 2012, compete in its inaugural season as a member of the West Division.

The team's debut match incidentally is the league's first match as well. The Gladiators began their season by playing against the Pune Marathas in November 2012.
