= Elite Football League of India =

American football league

EFLI
- Most recent season or competition: 2012 EFLI season
- Sport: American football
- Founded: 5 August 2011; 15 years ago
- First season: 2012
- CEO: Richard Whelan
- No. of teams: 23
- Country: India (20 teams); Pakistan (1 team); Sri Lanka (2 teams)
- Most recent champion: Pune Marathas (1st title)
- Most titles: Pune Marathas (1)
- Broadcasters: TEN Sports; TEN Action

The Elite Football League of India (EFLI) was a professional American football league based in India. It was founded with eight franchises in 2011, and had 23 franchises throughout South Asia, among whom 20 located in India, two in Sri Lanka and one in Pakistan. The league had only two seasons.

The winners of the first championship were Pune Marathas, who claimed the title after defeating Delhi Defenders 6–0 in the Elite Bowl I on 10 November 2012.

== Establishment ==
In August 2011, the EFLI announced the launch of the league. The aim of the league was to introduce American football to the Indian market and its large consumer base. The organisation's management team consisted of United States and Indian business and entertainment executives, and several U.S. sports figures. U.S. brand marketing consultant Sunday Zeller was reported as the founder.

Prominent investors included Brandon Chillar, an Indian American linebacker from the Super Bowl-winning Green Bay Packers who played eight games in the 2010 season before an injury placed him on the injured reserve list, Super Bowl-winning head coach Mike Ditka, former Dallas Cowboys wide receiver Michael Irvin, and former NFL quarterbacks Ron Jaworski and Kurt Warner. Investors outside of the sports community included U.S. actor and entertainment producer Mark Wahlberg.

The first regular-season games began on 22 September 2012. EFLI games were broadcast on television in India, Sri Lanka, and Pakistan, and in the Maldives, Bangladesh, Nepal, Hong Kong, Indonesia and Japan on Ten Sports. This represented a potential audience of over 500 million viewers.

== League structure ==
The EFLI management's intent is to draw current rugby players from India over to the sport, in part by paying higher salaries than the rugby leagues. In the announcement of the league on 5 August 2011, CEO Richard Whelan noted that orientation programmes had attracted over 4,000 interested players in the previous month alone. Similar orientation events are planned for Sri Lanka, Pakistan, Bangladesh and Nepal to attract a wide talent pool.

Ownership of the teams will follow a franchise system, similar to the structure of the NFL, and ownership will be determined in an auction format. Unlike ownership rules in other Indian sports leagues, bidding will be open to both Indian and non-Indian investors alike. Although specifics about league finances have not been announced, officials note that 15% of revenues will be shared with the Ministry of Sports.

While the teams represent cities across India, Sri Lanka and Pakistan, all games for the inaugural season were hosted in Sugathadasa Stadium in Colombo, Sri Lanka. The Sports Authority of India provided also the Balewadi Stadium, which was used for pre-season activities. The games were held in a round-robin format so that all teams played each other.

The expansion plans include total of 24 teams, as a part of a project, which aims to expand to 52 teams by 2022.

== Teams-across Asia ==
=== Current teams ===
India	Pakistan	Sri Lanka
Location of EFLI teams in India (Stallions and Warriors are not pinned on this map, because the associated cities have not been announced yet.)	Location of EFLI teams in Pakistan	Location of EFLI teams in Sri Lanka

Conference	Team	City/State	Stadium	First season
North Division
North 1 Conference 1	Amritsar Guardians	(India) Amritsar, Punjab	TBA	TBA (Season 2)
North 1 Conference 1	Patiala Silverbacks	(India) Patiala, Punjab	TBA	TBA (Season 2)
North 1 Conference 1	Punjab Stallions	(India) TBA, Punjab	TBA	TBA (Season 2)
North 1 Conference 1	Chandigarh Tigers	(India) Chandigarh	TBA	TBA (Season 2)
North 2 Conference 2	Delhi Defenders	(India) Delhi, Capital Territory	Defenders Ground	2012 (Season 1)
North 2 Conference 2	Lucknow Swarm	(India) Lucknow, Uttar Pradesh	TBA	TBA (Season 2)
North 2 Conference 2	Kolkata Vipers	(India) Kolkata, West Bengal	Salt Lake Stadium	2012 (Season 1)
North 2 Conference 2	Haryana Warriors	(India) TBA, Haryana	TBA	TBA (Season 2)
Center Division
Center 1 Conference 3	Surat Diamonds	(India) Surat, Gujarat	TBA	TBA (Season 2)
Center 1 Conference 3	Indore Flash	(India) Indore, Madhya Pradesh	TBA	TBA (Season 2)
Center 1 Conference 3	Jaipur Legends	(India) Jaipur, Rajasthan	TBA	TBA (Season 2)
Center 1 Conference 3	Gujarat Veers	(India) Ahmedabad, Gujarat	TBA	TBA (Season 2)
Center 2 Conference 4	Pune Blue Panthers	(India) Pune, Maharashtra	TBA	TBA (Season 2)
Center 2 Conference 4	Mumbai Gladiators	(India) Mumbai, Maharashtra	Cooperage Stadium	2012 (Season 1)
Center 2 Conference 4	Pune Marathas	(India) Pune, Maharashtra	Balewadi Stadium	2012 (Season 1)
Center 2 Conference 4	Navi Mumbai Sabers	(India) Navi Mumbai, Maharashtra	TBA	TBA (Season 2)
South Division
South 1 Conference 5	Bangalore Dragons	(India) Bangalore, Karnataka	TBA	TBA (Season 2)
South 1 Conference 5	Bangalore Warhawks	(India) Bangalore, Karnataka	Warhawks Ground	2012 (Season 1)
South 1 Conference 5	Goa Waves	(India) TBA, Goa	TBA	TBA (Season 2)
South 2 Conference 6	Chennai Cobras	(India) Chennai, Tamil Nadu	TBA	TBA (Season 2)
South 2 Conference 6	Kandy Kings^{1}	(Sri Lanka) Kandy, Central Province	TBA	TBA (Season 2)
South 2 Conference 6	Colombo Lions	(Sri Lanka) Colombo, Western Province	Sugathadasa Stadium	2012 (Season 1)
South 2 Conference 6	Pakistan Wolfpak	(Pakistan) Peshawar, Khyber Pakhtunkhwa	Wolfpak Ground	2012 (Season 1)
* denotes a relocation of a franchise. See respective team articles for more information.^{1} Kandy Kings are not to be confused with the now-defunct Kandy Skykings, which were known after their relocation as Hyderabad Skykings.

=== Former/defunct teams ===
Team	City/State	Stadium	First season	Last season
Hyderabad Skykings	(India) Hyderabad, Telangana	Gachibowli Stadium	2012 (Season 1)	2012 (Season 1)

== Championships ==
Season	Elite Bowl			Final Venue	MVP	# of Teams
Season	Winners	Score	Runners-up	Final Venue	MVP	# of Teams
2012; Details	Pune Marathas	06–00	Delhi Defenders	Sugathadasa Stadium, Colombo, Sri Lanka	Roshan Lobo (RB, Warhawks)	8
2015	Cancelled in favour of inaugural EFLI University Championship					

=== Elite Bowl records ===
In the table below, teams are ordered first by number of wins, then by number of appearances, and finally by year of first appearance. In the "Season(s)" column, bold years indicate winning seasons.

	Team	Appearances	Wins	Losses	Season(s)
1	Pune Marathas	1	1	0	2012
2	Delhi Defenders	1	0	1	2012

== Documentary ==
In 2012, the filmmaking duo Evan Rosenfeld and Jenna Moshell began following the EFLI and chronicling its inaugural season and the introduction of American football to South Asia in the documentary Birth of a Sport.

== See also ==
- National Football League
- NFL Europe
- Israeli Football League
- Philippine Tackle Football League
- Korea American Football Association (South Korea)
- X-League (Japan)
- List of leagues of American and Canadian football
