= Roll Ball World Cup =

International roll ball world cup

Tournament information
- Location: Various
- Month played: Various
- Established: 2011
- Format: Group stage followed by knockout
- Most championships: (M) India (5 Titles) (W) India (3 Titles)

Current champion
- India (men); India (women)

The Roll Ball World Cup is an international men's and women's international roll ball tournament organized by the International Roll Ball Federation (IRBF).

== Summary ==
=== 2011 World Cup ===
The first Roll Ball World Cup was held at the Shree Shiv Chhatrapati Sports Complex in Pune in Maharashtra state of the Republic of India. It was held between April 17 and 22, 2011. Denmark was the winner and India was the runner-up.

=== 2013 World Cup ===
The second World Cup was held in Nairobi, Kenya, from 3 to 6 October 2013. It was won by India by defeating Iran in the final.

=== 2015 World Cup ===
The hosts India won the third Roll Ball World Cup by beating Iran by 6–4 in the final. It was held in Pune in Balewadi Stadium.

=== 2017 World Cup ===
The host was Bangladesh and the venue was Dhaka. In the men's category, India defeated Iran by 8–7 while the women defeated the same opponent by 6–4.

=== 2019 World Cup ===
The host was India and the venue was Chennai. In the men's category final, India defeated Kenya by 9–3 while Kenya women's team triumphed against India women's team by 2–1.

=== 2023 World Cup ===
The hosting nation was India and the venue was Pune. In the men's category final, Kenya defeated India by 7–4 while in the women's category final Kenya defeated Egypt by 5–0.

== Results ==
=== Detail results ===
==== Men ====
1. 2023
2. 2019
3. 2017
4. 2015
5. 2013
6. 2011

==== Women ====
1. 2023
2. 2019
3. 2017
4. 2015
5. 2013
6. 2011

=== Men ===
Year	Host	Final			Third place match		
Year	Host	Winner	Score	Runner-up	3rd place	Score	4th place
2011	(India); Pune	Denmark	15–1	India	Belarus	15–1	Nepal
2013	(Kenya); Nairobi	India	9–6	Iran	Denmark	4–3	Kenya
2015	(India); Pune	India	6–4	Iran	Latvia	7–4	Kenya
2017	(Bangladesh); Dhaka	India	8–7	Iran	Kenya	7–1	Bangladesh
2019	(India); Chennai	India	9–3	Kenya	Bangladesh	7–2	Senegal
2023	(India); Pune	Kenya	7–4	India	Senegal	8–5	Latvia
2025	(United Arab Emirates); Dubai	India	11–10	Kenya	Iran	9–8	Egypt

=== Women ===
Year	Host	Final			Third place match		
Year	Host	Winner	Score	Runner-up	3rd place	Score	4th place
2011	(India); Pune	No Women Tournament					
2013	(Kenya); Nairobi	India	10–1	Kenya	Nepal	_	Only 3 Teams
2015	(India); Pune	Kenya	2–1	India	Iran	1–0	Uganda
2017	(Bangladesh); Dhaka	India	6–4	Iran	Kenya	8–1	Senegal
2019	(India); Chennai	Kenya	2–1	India	Egypt	3–2	Nepal
2023	(India); Pune	Kenya	5–0	Egypt	India	12–1	Poland
2025	(United Arab Emirates); Dubai	India	3–2	Kenya	Iran	19–1	Sri Lanka

== Continental championship ==
=== Asian Championship ===
1. 2024 Men
2. 2024 Women
3. 2019 Men
4. 2019 Women
5. 2016 Men
6. 2016 Women
7. 2010 Men
8. 2010 Women

=== South Asian Championship ===
1. 2017 Men
2. 2017 Women
3. 2014 Men
4. 2014 Women
5. 2012 Men
6. 2012 Women

=== East African Championship ===
1. 2019 Men
2. 2019 Women
3. 2016 Men
4. 2016 Women
5. 2015 Men
6. 2015 Women
7. 2013 Men
8. 2013 Women

=== African Championship ===
1. 2016 Men
2. 2016 Women

== Medal table ==
=== Total ===
Rank	Nation	Gold	Silver	Bronze	Total
1	India	8	4	1	13
2	Kenya	4	4	2	10
3	Denmark	1	0	1	2
4	Iran	0	4	3	7
5	Egypt	0	1	1	2
6	Bangladesh	0	0	1	1
6	Belarus	0	0	1	1
6	Latvia	0	0	1	1
6	Nepal	0	0	1	1
6	Senegal	0	0	1	1
Totals (10 entries)		13	13	13	39

=== Men ===
Rank	Nation	Gold	Silver	Bronze	Total
1	India	5	2	0	7
2	Kenya	1	2	1	4
3	Denmark	1	0	1	2
4	Iran	0	3	1	4
5	Bangladesh	0	0	1	1
5	Belarus	0	0	1	1
5	Latvia	0	0	1	1
5	Senegal	0	0	1	1
Totals (8 entries)		7	7	7	21

=== Women ===
Rank	Nation	Gold	Silver	Bronze	Total
1	India	3	2	1	6
1	Kenya	3	2	1	6
3	Iran	0	1	2	3
4	Egypt	0	1	1	2
5	Nepal	0	0	1	1
Totals (5 entries)		6	6	6	18

== Rollball results ==
1. Overall
2. Archive - 2021 Men - 2021 Women
3. 2021 Men
4. 2021 Women
5. 2020 Men
6. 2020 Women
7. 2019 Men
8. 2019 Women
9. 2018 Men
10. 2018 Women
11. 2017 Men
12. 2017 Women
13. 2016 Men
14. 2016 Women
15. 2015 Men
16. 2015 Women
17. 2014 Men
18. 2014 Women
19. 2013 Men
20. 2013 Women
21. 2012 Men
22. 2012 Women
23. 2011 Men
24. 2011 Women
25. 2010 Men
26. 2010 Women
