= Roll ball =

Roller skate sport

- Highest governing body: International Roll Ball Federation
- First played: 2005 (Pune, India)

Characteristics
- Contact: No
- Team members: 6
- Equipment: Roller skates, pads, helmet
- Venue: Hard surface court

Presence
- Country or region: Worldwide
- Olympic: No
- World Championships: Roll Ball World Cup
- Paralympic: No

Roll ball is a game played between two teams and is a unique combination of inline skates, basketball, handball, and throwball. It is played on "roller shoes" with each team consisting of twelve players, six on the field and six in reserve. The main objective of the game is to score maximum goals within a stipulated time. The main feature of roll ball is that the ball is held in one or both hands, when passing to the other players, with the ball repeatedly bounced on the ground.

== History ==
The game was invented by Raju Dabhade of Pune, India, while he was the sports teacher at MES Bal Shikshan Mandir, an English medium school. Dabhade is also secretary of the International Roll Ball Federation (IRBF).

== Rules and equipment ==
The roll-ball can be used by more than one player in the game. It is not an individual equipment.

Ball used	Weight	Circumference	Age group
Mini roll ball	340 gram to 400 gram	54 cm to 56 cm	Sub-junior girls, junior girls, senior girls
Normal roll ball	425 gram to 475 gram	58 cm to 60 cm	Junior boys, senior boys

Inline skates, plus a helmet, knee pads, and other forms of protective guards.

=== Playing court ===
The court size can vary from 28 to 40 metres (92 to 131 ft) in length and 15 to 20 metres (49 to 66 ft) in width. The court includes a center-line dividing offensive and defensive areas. The penalty line is drawn 4.5 m or 3.5 m away from the goal. Free Throw line or Goalkeeper's line or D arena is 3.5 m to 2.5 m away from the goal. The playing court is marked by 5 cm boundary line. All other lines are marked by red or white color. The court is any hard surface. A 3-meter line is drawn as a safety margin outside the boundary line. The goal is 2.25 meters wide by 2.00 meters height.

== Roll Ball World Cup ==
=== 2011 World Cup ===
==== Inauguration ====
The 1st Roll Ball World Cup was inaugurated by the Mayor of Pune, Mohansingh Rajpal. The opening ceremony started with lighting of the lamp representing Indian culture. A dance was performance by the dancer Parimal Phadke and his group set the tone of the Opening Ceremony. Following it was a performance by Milind Date accompanied by Devdatta Phadke. Next, there were two more performances by the Sphinx Adonis group and a group dance related to India. The opening ceremony ended with a demonstration match of Roll Ball. The competition was held from 17 to 22 April 2011.

2011 Roll Ball World Cup results
Position (men's only)	Country
1	Denmark
2	India

=== 2013 World Cup ===
The 2nd Roll Ball World Cup was held from 3 to 6 October 2013, at MOI International Sports Centre, Kasarani, Nairobi, Kenya. The event was organized by Kenya Roll Ball Federation, Africa Roll Ball Federation and Ministry of Youth Affairs and Sports Kenya under the aegis of International Roll Ball Federation. This event was organized in both Men's and Women's categories. The championship was declared open by Gordon Olouch, a Commissioner of Sports from Kenya.

=== 2015 World Cup ===
==== Preparations ====
The preparations for this World Cup began almost a year ahead with the logo for the championship being launched on 11 October 2015. The inauguration was held at the banquet hall of Hotel Marriot, S. B. Road, Pune.

==== Opening ceremony ====
The 3rd Roll Ball World Cup was inaugurated by the Mayor of Pune, Dattatray Dhankawde. This was followed by a march of all the participants from different countries. Ganesh Vandana was performed by dancers of Surabhee Cultural Academy, the classical dancers of Sanskriti Kala Manch, and the students of Bal Shikshan Mandir School, Mahesh Vidyalaya, Ryan International School, followed by a demonstration of yoga. The dance performances were followed by singing performance of the students of Blind School Pune.

==== Teams ====
The opening ceremony ended with the first league match in the women's category. An important tradition of the IRBF began that year with the slogan "Women's match in respect to Woman Power". This was a gesture by the IRBF to give importance to women empowerment. Out of the 32 confirmed teams, 26 countries participated in this championship which were Argentina, Bangladesh, Belarus, Benin, Bhutan, China, Denmark, Egypt, England, Fiji, India, Indonesia, Iran, Kenya, Latvia, Malaysia, Nepal, Netherlands, New Zealand, Russia, Senegal, Singapore, Slovenia, Sri Lanka, Uganda and Zambia. Six countries could not participate due to technical problems.

The League matches started on 15 December and were played until 20 December. The women's semifinal and men's quarterfinal matches were played on Saturday, 19 December. The Prize distribution of the Women's event was done by Swarn Singh Chhabda, a Secretary Sports Authority of India.

The men's semifinal matches were played on Sunday, 20 December. Shri Anil Shirole, MP Pune City, distributed prizes, accompanied by Penninah Kabenge, President of the International Roll Ball Federation.

==== Final remarks ====
Another important gesture by the IRBF was the social aspect brought to the championship by giving an opportunity for blind children to perform during the opening ceremony. A "Wheelchair Roll Ball" match was demonstrated by the Paraplegic Rehabilitation Center of the Indian Army. The BBC aired the cup on various global stations.

2015 Roll Ball World Cup results
Position	Women	Men
1	Kenya	India
2	India	Iran
3	Iran	Latvia

=== 2017 World Cup ===
==== Preparations and selection process ====
The 4th Roll Ball World Cup was held at Dhaka Bangladesh from 17 to 23 February 2017. Both the Indian Men and Women's teams participated in this World Cup. The preparations for this world cup began almost three months back with the selection process of the Indian team. Senior players who participated in the Roll Ball National Championship were invited for the selection trials. In total 68 male and 28 female participants joined the selection process. The selection process included anthropomorphic measurements and 8 different physical fitness and skill tests. Out the participants, 20 players each were selected for the training for 10 days which was organized at the Shiv Chhatrapati Sports Complex, Pune. The final Indian teams were selected from this camp.

==== Inauguration ====
The 4th Roll Ball World Cup was inaugurated by AHM Mustafa Kamal, the Minister of Planning Govt. of the People's Republic of Bangladesh, among many notable names.

Around 590 players, 100 officials, and 200 scout cadets from a total of 39 countries situated across Asia, Africa, Europe, Oceania and South America took part in the Roll Ball World Cup 2017. The World Cup matches were played at three different venues - Shaikh Russel Roll Ball Stadium, Hand Ball Stadium and Mirpur Indoor Stadium. The opening and closing ceremonies were held at the Sheikh Russel Roller Skating Complex at Paltan Maidan Dhaka Bangladesh.

==== Teams ====
The men's team were India, Ivory Coast, England, Sierra Leone, Oman, Iran, Argentina, Egypt, Uganda, Tanzania, Latvia, Pakistan, Guinea, Indonesia, Rwanda, Bangladesh, Bhutan, Myanmar, Fiji, Hong Kong, Nepal, Benin, France, Thailand, China, Kenya, Denmark, Sri Lanka, Senegal, Philippines, Belarus, Uruguay, Saudi Arabia, Turkey, Zambia, Chinese Taipei, Netherlands, and Vietnam.

The women's team were Kenya, England, Thailand, Indonesia, India, Slovenia, Egypt, Sierra Leone, Iran, Pakistan, China, Tanzania, Bangladesh, Nepal, Philippines, Sri Lanka, Rwanda, Zambia, Argentina, Denmark, Turkey, Latvia, Uruguay, Benin, Uganda, Senegal, and Chinese Taipei.

The Prize distribution of the Men's and Women world cup was done by the Prime Minister of Bangladesh, Sheikh Hasina in the presence of Abdul Hamid, a President Peoples Republic of Bangladesh Dhaka, and Mustafa Kamal, a Minister of Planning Govt. of Peoples Republic of Bangladesh, among many others. In the 4th Roll Ball World Cup all 113 matches were broadcast live.

==== Results ====
2017 Roll Ball World Cup results
Position	Men	Women
1	India	India
2	Iran	Iran
3	Kenya	Kenya

==== The Stadium ====
The Shaikh Russel Stadium was built in 75 day's record time with solar panels on top of the roof by the Bangladesh government specially for Roll Ball World Cup. All World Cup venues and accommodation area were given free Wi-Fi network along with high security.

=== 2019 World Cup ===
==== Inauguration ====
The inauguration function was held on 15 November 2019 at ICF Indoor Stadium. V.V.Moorthy, ME, MBA, Member of State Advisory Committee, Youth Welfare and Sports Development Department was the Chief Guest.

==== Teams ====
In this World Cup, 28 countries participated. The men's team countries were Bangladesh, Belarus, Canada, France, Guinea, Ivory Coast (Ivoirian), Kenya, Latvia, Nepal, New Zealand, Poland, Sierra Leone, Singapore, Sri Lanka, Uganda, England, Oman, Saudi Arabia, India, the Netherlands, Egypt, China, Vietnam, Senegal, Argentina, Uruguay, and Iran.

The women's team countries were Bangladesh, Guinea, Ivory Coast, Kenya, Latvia, Male, Nepal, Poland, Sierra Leone, Sri Lanka, Uganda, England, India, the Netherlands, Egypt, China, Senegal, and Iran.

==== Results ====
2019 Roll Ball World Cup results
Position	Men	Women
1	India	Kenya
2	Kenya	India
3	Bangladesh	Egypt

=== 2025 World Cup ===
Was held in UAE.

== Youth World Cup ==
=== 2025 ===
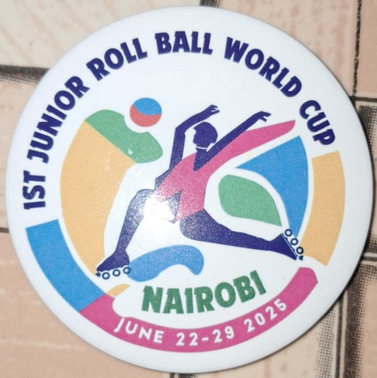
2025 Youth World Cup logo pin

The first Junior Roll Ball World Cup was held in Nairobi, Kenya between June 22 and 29, 2025. It was organized by International Roll Ball Federation, Kenya Roll Ball Federation and key stakeholders of the sport.

The inaugural junior championship tournament brought together players aged 17 and below with matches that were organized at the Kasarani and Ulinzi Sports Complex indoor arenas.

6 teams in boys and 4 teams in girls.

Tournament Format

Boys: Top 2 teams from each pool advance to semi-finals

Girls: Round-robin format with all teams playing each other

Points: 3 points for a win, 0 points for a loss

Tiebreaker: Goal difference, then goals scored

Boy: KEN, SRI, CON, IND, SSD, TAN ------- Group A: KEN/SRI/Congo Group B: IND/South Sudan/Tanzania

Girl: KEN, IND, SSD, TAN

Medalists:

Men (6): 1-IND 2- KEN 3- SRI 4- South Sudan 5- Tanzania 6- DRC Congo

Women (3): 1-IND 2- KEN 3-South Sudan 4- Tanzania (withdraw)

==== Men ====
Kenya9 - 0DRC

India14 - 0South Sudan

India14 - 1Tanzania

Kenya3 - 0Sri Lanka

DRC2 - 4Sri Lanka

South Sudan2 - 1Tanzania

boysSemi Final

Kenya10 - 0South Sudan

boysSemi Final

India21 - 0Sri Lanka

boys5th & 6th Place

Tanzania2 - 1DRC

boys3rd & 4th Place

South Sudan1 - 5Sri Lanka

boysBoys Final

Kenya1 - 5India

==== Women ====
Girls Round Robin

Kenya14 - 0South Sudan

Kenya0 - 6IndiaIndia

Kenya0 - 6India

India23 - 0South Sudan

Final

Kenya0 - 5India
