= 2012–13 Mumbai FC season =

Indian football club season

Mumbai
2012–13 season
- Chairman: Henry Picardo
- Manager: Khalid Jamil
- I-League: 6th
- Federation Cup: Group Stage
- Top goalscorer: League: Yusif Yakubu (6 goals); All: David Opara (7 goals)
Home colours	Away colours

The 2012–13 Mumbai F.C. season will be the club's sixth season since their formation in 2007 and their fifth season ever in the I-League which is India's top football league.

== Background ==
The club played their first season in the I-League during the 2008–09 I-League season. The club played their first ever I-League match against historic club Mohun Bagan on 27 September 2008 in which Abel Hammond scored the first ever I-League goal for Mumbai FC as Mumbai went on to win 2–1 at the Barasat Stadium. Mumbai then completed a double against the two giant Kolkata clubs after they defeated East Bengal F.C. at the Salt Lake Stadium 1–0 with Felix Aboagye scoring the only goal. Mumbai then played their first ever home match in their history at the Cooperage Ground on 11 October 2008 with Kalia Kulothungan scoring the only goal in the match. Half-way through the season Mumbai was placed in sixth place in the table. The club, however, could not last in the I-League and finished in 7th place which currently remains their best position to date.

== Transfers ==
In:

Out:

Note: Flags indicate national team as has been defined under FIFA eligibility rules. Players may hold more than one non-FIFA nationality.

No.	Pos.	Nation	Player
—	DF	IND	William Colaco (from Dempo)
—	DF	GHA	Evans Quao (Free Agent)
—	GK	IND	Kunal Sawant (from Air India)
—	DF	IND	Justin Stephen (from Prayag United)
—	DF	IND	Kamaljeet Kumar (from Pune)
—	DF	IND	James Singh (from Mohun Bagan)
—	FW	IND	Gabriel Fernandes (from Sporting Goa)
—	FW	NGA	David Opara (from Churchill Brothers)
—	FW	GHA	Yusif Yakubu (from Prayag United)
—	GK	IND	Luis Barreto (on loan from Dempo)
—	MF	IND	Chhangte Malsawmkima (Free Agent)

No.	Pos.	Nation	Player
—	GK	IND	Ishan Debnath (to Prayag United)
—	FW	IND	Cavin Lobo (to East Bengal)
—	MF	IND	Chhangte Malsawmkima (to Salgaocar)
—	DF	IND	Keegan Pereira (to Salgaocar)
—	FW	NGA	Gbeneme Friday (to Shillong Lajong)
—	FW	NGA	Ebi Sukore (to Shillong Lajong)
—	MF	NGA	Kingsley Chioma (released)
—	MF	LBR	Eric Brown (to ONGC)
—	DF	IND	Dhanachandra Singh (to Prayag United)

== Federation Cup ==
Mumbai entered the 2012 Indian Federation Cup automatically as they were already in the I-League. They were placed in Group A along with defending I-League champions Dempo, Pailan Arrows, and Shillong Lajong and their matches were played in Jamshedpur. The tournament did not end well for Mumbai as they lost two of their matches and drew one, finishing with 1 point, 3 goals scored and 7 conceded.

19 September 2012 Group Stage	Mumbai	1 – 2	Shillong Lajong	Jamshedpur, Orissa
15:00 IST	Opara 45'	Report	Menyongar 43'; Friday 90'	Stadium: Keenan Stadium

21 September 2012 Group Stage	Pailan Arrows	2 – 2	Mumbai	Jamshedpur, Orissa
15:00 IST	Ganeshan 45'; Devrani 78'	Report	Opara 12', 62'	Stadium: Keenan Stadium

23 September 2012 Group Stage	Mumbai	0 – 4	Dempo	Jamshedpur, Orissa
15:00 IST		Report	Miranda 23'; Sakibo 43', 79', 90'	Stadium: JRD Tata Sports Complex

== I-League ==
Mumbai began their first I-League game of 2012–13 away from home on 6 October 2012 against Pailan Arrows in which the team lost 3–2. The next match was not any better as Mumbai lost 3–2 to Pune at the Balewadi Sports Complex in Pune on 11 October 2012. After the defeat Mumbai had a two-week break before their next match on 27 October 2012 against Churchill Brothers at the Fatorda Stadium in Margao, Goa but when the match came Mumbai failed to secure yet another point as they lost their third game on the trot by a score of 3–1 with Ghanaian Yusif Yakubu scoring his first goal for Mumbai.

Mumbai started November with yet another lost as they stumbled to former champions Salgaocar at the Balewadi Sports Complex 1–0 after a 9th-minute goal for Francis Fernandes. This was Mumbai's fourth loss in a row and thus meant that after the first four matches of season, Mumbai had managed to win 0 points. However Mumbai finally won their first match of the season in their fifth attempt as they came back from 2–0 down to win 3–2 on 9 November 2012 at the Balewadi Sports Complex with Gabriel Fernandes, Justin Stephen, and Afghani international Zohib Islam Amiri scoring the goals for Mumbai. Mumbai then won their second game in a row on 17 November 2012 against Sporting Clube de Goa at the Balewadi Sports Complex Nicholas Rodrigues, Gabriel Fernandes, Justin Stephen, and David Opara providing the goals for Mumbai. Mumbai then drew their first match of the season in a surprising 1–1 draw on 25 November 2012 with Mohun Bagan at the Balewadi Sports Complex after former Indian international Abhishek Yadav scored the equalizer for Mumbai in the 62nd minute after three-time I-League top scorer Odafe Onyeka Okolie gave Bagan the lead in the 21st minute. The club then ended the month of November with their third win in four games on 28 November 2012 against ONGC F.C. at the Balewadi Sports Complex (this was Mumbai's 5th home game in a row) after Ghanaian Evans Quao gave Mumbai the winner in the 73rd minute.

The club then began the month of December with a major upset over new rich-boys Prayag United S.C. at the Salt Lake Stadium in Kolkata after Evans Quao scored a 52nd-minute equalizer for Mumbai after Ranti Martins gave Prayag the lead in the 29th minute; Mumbai then scored two more goals with Abhishek Yadav and Yusif Yakubu being the scorers in the 82nd and 94th minute to award Mumbai a special 3–2 victory. The club then went from major upsetters to the team that was getting the upset against them after the club lost 4–1 to relegation fighters Air India FC at the Balewadi Sports Complex. This was Mumbai's first loss in 6 games. The club then regrouped and went back onto the winning track after they defeated newly promoted side United Sikkim at the Balewadi Sports Complex on 15 December 2012 with David Opara being the only goalscorer for Mumbai in the 45th minute as the club won 1–0. The club then came up as the surprise winners again after they defeated Kolkata giants East Bengal F.C. at the Balewadi Sports Complex 2–1 thanks to goals from Gabriel Fernandes and Yusif Yakubu in the 64th and 94th minutes respectively; this result pushed Mumbai into fifth place, ahead of Prayag United, eight rounds after they found themselves in last place in the I-League and staring relegation in the face. Mumbai then ended the month of December and 2012 with a draw against the reigning champions of the I-League, Dempo S.C. at the Balewadi Sports Complex on 30 December 2012.

Then to begin the month of January and the year 2013 Mumbai took on United Sikkim at the Paljor Stadium on 9 January 2013 in Round 15 after their Round 14 clash with Mohun Bagan was canceled due to Bagan being expelled from the league. Mumbai drew the match late on by a score of 2–2 after Yusif Yakubu scored the equalizer for the club four minutes into second half stoppage time but not before he gave Mumbai the lead in the 11th minute before United Sikkim scored two goals in the 15th and 18th minutes of the match. The club then succumbed to their first loss of the season on 13 January 2013 when the club lost to East Bengal at the Kalyani Stadium in West Bengal by a score of 2–0 with Edeh and Lalrindika Ralte scoring the goals for East Bengal. However Mumbai did not let that loss get to them as they went back to winning ways on 19 January 2013 against Prayag United at the Balewadi Sports Complex when the club beaten them by a score of 2–1 with Gabriel Fernandes scoring the goal for Mumbai in the 30th minute before C.K. Vineeth equalized for Prayag in the 47th minute but Mumbai then won the match three minutes later in the 50th minute when Bello Razaq scored an own-goal and thus award the victory to Mumbai. The club then played their final match of January 2013 on 24 January 2013 against Churchill Brothers in which the club drew the match 0–0.

6 October 2012 Round 1	Pailan Arrows	3 – 2	Mumbai	Kolkata, West Bengal
14:30 IST	Narzary 34', 76'; Singh 54'	Report	Opara 39'; Singh 45'	Stadium: Salt Lake Stadium

11 October 2012 Round 2	Pune	3 – 2	Mumbai	Pune, Maharashtra
18:30 IST	Nishiguchi 6', 52'; Lalpekhlua 75'	Report	Quao 17'; Opara 25'	Stadium: Balewadi Sports Complex; Attendance: 3014; Referee: Vishnu Chauhan

27 October 2012 Round 3	Churchill Brothers	3 – 1	Mumbai	Margao, Goa
17:30 IST	Yadav (o.g.) 17'; Moghrabi 33'; Beto 69' (pen.)	Report	Yakubu 62'	Stadium: Fatorda Stadium

3 November 2012 Round 4	Mumbai	0 – 1	Salgaocar	Pune, Maharashtra
15:00 IST		Report	Fernandes 9'	Stadium: Balewadi Sports Complex; Referee: P. Dhar

9 November 2012 Round 5	Mumbai	3 – 2	Sporting Goa	Pune, Maharashtra
15:00 IST	G. Fernandes 26'; Stephen 45+2'; Amiri 89'	Report	Obiora 13'; D. Fernandes 18'	Stadium: Balewadi Sports Complex; Referee: C.R. Srikrishna (Tamil Nadu)

17 November 2012 Round 6	Mumbai	4 – 1	Shillong Lajong	Pune, Maharashtra
15:00 IST	Rodrigues 18'; Fernandes 20'; Stephen 82'; Opara 90+2'	Report	Singh 75'	Stadium: Balewadi Sports Complex; Referee: T. Nagvenkar

25 November 2012 Round 7	Mumbai	Cancelled	Mohun Bagan	Pune, Maharashtra
19:00 IST	Yadav 62'	Report	Okolie 21'	Stadium: Balewadi Sports Complex; Referee: T. Nagvenkar

28 November 2012 Round 8	Mumbai	1 – 0	ONGC	Pune, Maharashtra
15:00 IST	Quao 73'	Report		Stadium: Balewadi Sports Complex; Referee: P. Dhar

2 December 2012 Round 9	Prayag United	2 – 3	Mumbai	Kolkata, West Bengal
14:00 IST	Martins 29'; Oraon 90+2'	Report	Quao 52'; Yadav 82'; Yakubu 90+4'	Stadium: Salt Lake Stadium; Referee: A. Costa

9 December 2012 Round 10	Air India	4 – 1	Mumbai	Pune, Maharashtra
15:00 IST	Ezeh 36'; Fernandes 40'; Shetty 72'; Chakraborty 90+2'	Report	Yakubu 45+1'	Stadium: Balewadi Sports Complex; Referee: A. Arjunan

15 December 2012 Round 11	Mumbai	1 – 0	United Sikkim	Pune, Maharashtra
19:00 IST	Opara 45+1'	Report		Stadium: Balewadi Sports Complex; Referee: A. Meetei

23 December 2012 Round 12	Mumbai	2 – 1	East Bengal	Pune, Maharashtra
19:00 IST	Fernandes 64'; Yakubu 90+4'	Report	Edeh 90+7'	Stadium: Balewadi Sports Complex; Referee: A. Costa

30 December 2012 Round 13	Mumbai	0 – 0	Dempo	Pune, Maharashtra
15:00 IST		Report		Stadium: Balewadi Sports Complex; Referee: D. Naik

Round 14	Bye Round
Note: Mumbai were supposed to play against Mohun Bagan but the match was cancelled as Mohun Bagan were expelled from the 2012–13 I-League.

9 January 2013 Round 15	United Sikkim	2 – 2	Mumbai	Gangtok, Sikkim
15:00 IST	Bhutia 15'; Machado 18'	Report	Yakubu 11', 90+4'	Stadium: Paljor Stadium; Referee: R. Singh

13 January 2013 Round 16	East Bengal	2 – 0	Mumbai	Kalyani, West Bengal
14:00 IST	Chidi 11'; Ralte 53'	Report		Stadium: Kalyani Stadium; Referee: Santosh Kumar

19 January 2013 Round 17	Mumbai	2 – 1	Prayag United	Pune, Maharashtra
19:00 IST	Fernandes 30'; Razaq 50' (o.g.)	Report	Vineeth 47'	Stadium: Balewadi Sports Complex; Referee: A. Arjunan

24 January 2013 Round 18	Mumbai	0 – 0	Churchill Brothers	Pune, Maharashtra
15:00 IST		Report		Stadium: Balewadi Sports Complex

3 February 2013 Round 19	Dempo	v	Mumbai	Mapusa, Goa
15:00 IST				Stadium: Duler Stadium

=== Results summary ===
Overall								Home						Away					
Pld	W	D	L	GF	GA	GD	Pts	W	D	L	GF	GA	GD	W	D	L	GF	GA	GD
15	7	2	6	24	25	−1	23	6	1	1	13	6	+7	1	1	5	11	19	−8

Last updated: 19 January 2013.
Source: I-League table

=== Position by round ===
Round	1	2	3	4	5	6	7	8	9	10	11	12	13	14	15	16	17	18	19	20	21	22	23	24	25	26
Result	L	L	L	L	W	W	C	W	W	L	W	W	D	P	D	L	W									
Position	10	11	13	14	12	9	8	8	7	7	6	5	5	5	6	6	6									

Updated to match(es) played on 19 January 2013. Source: Mumbai FC
W = Win; D = Draw; L = Loss

== Players ==
=== First-team squad ===
As of 23 December 2012.

Note: Flags indicate national team as defined under FIFA eligibility rules; some limited exceptions apply. Players may hold more than one non-FIFA nationality.

No.	Pos.	Nation	Player
1	GK	IND	Sanjiban Ghosh
3	DF	IND	William Colaco
4	DF	IND	Peter Costa
5	DF	IND	Justin Stephen
6	MF	IND	Ashutosh Mehta
7	MF	IND	Nicholas Rodrigues
8	MF	IND	James Singh
9	FW	IND	Abhishek Yadav
10	FW	GHA	Yusif Yakubu
11	MF	IND	Subhas Chakraborty
12	MF	IND	Sampath Kuttimani
13	GK	IND	Sharath Kuniyil
14	FW	IND	Gabriel Fernandes

No.	Pos.	Nation	Player
15	MF	IND	Darren Caldeira
16	GK	IND	Luis Barreto (on loan from Dempo)
17	DF	IND	Kamaljeet Kumar
18	DF	AFG	Zohib Amiri (captain)
19	DF	IND	Faizal Rehman
20	FW	IND	Jayesh Rane
23	DF	IND	Dane Pereira
24	DF	GHA	Evans Quao
28	FW	NGA	David Opara
29	MF	IND	John Coutinho
31	GK	IND	Kunal Sawant
36	DF	IND	Ritesh Perambra
—	MF	IND	Rohit Mirza
—	MF	IND	Chhangte Malsawmkima

== Goalscorers ==
Place	Position	Nationality	Name	I-League	Federation Cup	Total
1	FW	(Nigeria)	David Opara	4	3	7
2	FW	(Ghana)	Yusif Yakubu	6	0	6
3	FW	(India)	Gabriel Fernandes	4	0	4
4	DF	(Ghana)	Evans Quao	3	0	3
5	DF	(India)	Justin Stephen	2	0	2
5	FW	(India)	Abhishek Yadav	2	0	2
7	MF	(India)	James Singh	1	0	1
7	MF	(India)	Nicholas Rodrigues	1	0	1
7	DF	(Afghanistan)	Zohib Amiri	1	0	1
			TOTALS	19	3	22
