= List of Air India FC managers =

This is a list of Air India Football Club's managers and their records from 2009, when the first full-time manager was appointed, to the present day.

== History ==
Ever since the beginning, Air India never really had a permanent professional manager. Most of their managers were primarily youth development coaches. It wasn't until 2010 when Air India signed their first A-licensed professional manager in Santosh Kashyap.

== Statistics ==
Information correct as of 30 December 2012. Only competitive matches are counted. Wins, losses and draws are results at the final whistle; the results of penalty shoot-outs are not counted.

Picture	Name	Nationality	From	To	P	W	D	L	GF	GA	Win%	Honours
	Bimal Ghosh	India	2008	2009	22	5	9	8	21	26	22.73	
	Yusif Ansari	India	2009	June 2010	26	7	7	12	28	46	26.92	
	Santosh Kashyap	India	August 2010	26 May 2012	52	14	14	24	54	94	26.92	
	Godfrey Pereira	India	3 July 2012	27 December 2012	17	7	3	7	25	27	41.18	2012 Durand Cup
	Anthony Fernandes	India	30 December 2012	2 March 2013	7	1	4	2	8	14	14.29	
	Naushad Moosa	India	2 March 2013	2013	0	0	0	0	0	0	—	
