= List of Mumbai FC seasons =

Mumbai Football Club is an Indian association football club based in Mumbai. The club was formed in 2007.

Mumbai have never won the League championship nor the Federation Cup.

== Key ==
- P = Played
- W = Games won
- D = Games drawn
- L = Games lost
- F = Goals for
- A = Goals against
- Pts = Points
- Pos = Final position
- IL = I-League
- F = Final
- Group = Group stage
- R16 = Round of 16
- QF = Quarter-finals
- R1 = Round 1
- R2 = Round 2
- R3 = Round 3
- R4 = Round 4
- R5 = Round 5
- R6 = Round 6
- SF = Semi-finals

1st or W	Winners
2nd or RU	Runners-up
↑	Promoted
↓	Relegated
♦	Top scorer in division

== Seasons ==
Results of league and cup competitions by season
Season	Division	P	W	D	L	F	A	Pts	Pos	Federation Cup	Super Cup	Asia	Round reached	Name	Goals
Season	League									Federation Cup	Super Cup	Asia	Round reached	Top goalscorer	
2008	IL2	10	8	1	1	18	5	25	1st	—	—	—	—	(Ghana) Felix Aboagye	4
2008-09	IL	22	7	7	8	22	27	28	7th	Group	—	—	—	(India) Kalia Kulothungan	7
2009-10	IL	26	6	11	9	24	26	29	11th	Group	—	—	—	—	—
2010-11	IL	26	9	7	10	24	28	34	7th	Group	—	—	—	(Nigeria) Ebi Sukore	9
2011-12	IL	26	7	3	16	31	52	24	11th	Group	—	—	—	(Nigeria) Gbeneme Friday	11
2012-13	IL	15	7	2	6	24	25	23	6th	Group				(Nigeria) David Opara	7
