= List of Mumbai FC managers =

This is a list of Mumbai Football Club's managers and their records, from 2007, when the first ever manager was appointed, to the present day.

== Statistics ==
Information correct as of 19 December 2011. Only competitive matches are counted. Wins, losses and draws are results at the final whistle; the results of penalty shoot-outs are not counted.

Picture	Name	Nationality	From	To	P	W	D	L	GF	GA	Win%	Honours
	David Booth	England	2007	August 2009	27	11	7	9	24	21	40.74	1 I-League 2nd Division
	Khalid Jamil	India	August 2009	June 2016	78	22	21	35	79	106	28.21	
	Santosh Kashyap	India	22 June 2016	17 March 2017	14	2	4	8	8	23	14.29	
	Oscar Bruzon	Spain	20 March 2017	May 2017	4	0	3	1	1	5	0.00	
