= 2012–13 I-League =

6th season of the I-League

I-League
- Season: 2012–13
- Champions: Churchill Brothers; 2nd I-League title 2nd Indian title
- Relegated: Air India; United Sikkim
- AFC Champions League: Pune
- AFC Cup: Pune; Churchill Brothers
- Matches: 182
- Goals: 531 (2.92 per match)
- Top goalscorer: Ranti Martins (26 goals)
- Biggest home win: Prayag United 10–1 United Sikkim (10 November 2012); Salgaocar 9–0 United Sikkim (13 April 2013)
- Biggest away win: Air India 0–6 Pune (20 April 2013)
- Highest scoring: Churchill Brothers 8–4 Sporting Goa (16 December 2012)
- Longest winning run: 6 games Churchill Brothers
- Longest unbeaten run: 10 games Churchill Brothers; Mohun Bagan
- Longest losing run: 6 games Air India

The 2012–13 I-League was the sixth season of the I-League, the Indian professional league for association football clubs, since its establishment in 2007. The season began on 6 October 2012 and finished on 12 May 2013 with Churchill Brothers crowned champions in matchday 25.

Dempo were the defending champions, having won their third I-League title the previous season.

On 29 December 2012, Mohun Bagan were barred from competing in the I-League for 2 years following a decision taken by the I League core committee. This was because they failed to turn up in the second half of the match against East Bengal because of crowd trouble. All their results in the I-League were declared null and void and all their remaining fixtures were cancelled.
But on 15 January 2013, Mohun Bagan appealed the decision to ban them from the league and were reinstated, but would start on 0 points.

== Teams ==
A total of 14 teams contested the league, including 12 sides from the 2011–12 season and two promoted from the 2012 I-League 2nd Division.

ONGC as champions and United Sikkim as runners-up secured direct promotion from the 2012 I-League 2nd Division. ONGC returned to the I-League after a one-year absence, while United Sikkim made their debut in the I-League.

=== Stadium Changes ===
==== Air India and Mumbai FC ====
Due to the ongoing redevelopment of the Cooperage Ground in Mumbai which is the regular home for Mumbai F.C. and Air India FC in the I-League both clubs will play at the Balewadi Sports Complex in Pune, Maharashtra until it is complete.

==== ONGC ====
The newly promoted ONGC F.C. also usually play at the Cooperage Ground in Mumbai but due to the redevelopment the team decided to play at the Ambedkar Stadium in Delhi which is where the main company, ONGC, are based. However it will only be for five home matches.

==== Goan clubs ====
The four Goan clubs in the I-League, Churchill Brothers, Dempo, Salgaocar, and Sporting Clube de Goa, usually play their I-League matches at the Fatorda Stadium in Margao. However, due to a major revamp at the stadium in preparation for the 2013 Lusophony Games which will be held in Goa, the Goan home games for the I-League will be played at the Duler Stadium and then the Tilak Maidan Stadium from the end of January.

=== Stadiums and Locations ===
Locations of teams in the 2012–13 I-League

Team	Location	Stadium	Capacity
Air India	Mumbai, Maharashtra	Balewadi Sports Complex	22,000 #
Churchill Brothers	Salcette, Goa	Duler Stadium	6,000 #
Dempo	Panjim, Goa	Duler Stadium	6,000 #
East Bengal	Kolkata, West Bengal	Salt Lake Stadium	120,000
Mohun Bagan	Kolkata, West Bengal	Salt Lake Stadium	120,000
Mumbai	Mumbai, Maharashtra	Balewadi Sports Complex	22,000 #
ONGC	Mumbai, Maharashtra	Ambedkar Stadium	20,000 #
Pailan Arrows	Kolkata, West Bengal	Salt Lake Stadium	120,000
Prayag United	Kolkata, West Bengal	Salt Lake Stadium	120,000
Pune	Pune, Maharashtra	Balewadi Sports Complex	22,000
Salgaocar	Vasco da Gama, Goa	Duler Stadium	6,000 #
Shillong Lajong	Shillong, Meghalaya	Nehru Stadium	30,000
Sporting Goa	Panjim, Goa	Duler Stadium	6,000 #
United Sikkim	Gangtok, Sikkim	Paljor Stadium	25,000

=== Personnel and kits ===
Note: Flags indicate national team as has been defined under FIFA eligibility rules. Players may hold more than one non-FIFA nationality.

Team	Manager	Captain	Shirt sponsor
Air India	(India) Naushad Moosa	(India) Vijith Shetty	Air India
Churchill Brothers	(India) Mariano Dias	(Brazil) Beto	Churchill
Dempo	(India) Armando Colaco	(India) Clifford Miranda	Dempo
East Bengal	(England) Trevor Morgan	(India) Sanju Pradhan	Kingfisher
Mohun Bagan	(Morocco) Karim Bencherifa	(Nigeria) Odafe Onyeka Okolie	Fila
Mumbai	(India) Khalid Jamil	(Afghanistan) Zohib Amiri	TEN HD
ONGC	(India) Santosh Kashyap	(India) Jatin Singh	ONGC
Pailan Arrows	(Australia) Arthur Papas	(India) Shouvik Ghosh	Poto Potato Flakes
Prayag United	(Netherlands) Eelco Schattorie	(India) Deepak Mondal	Prayag Group
Pune	(India) Derrick Pereira	(Ivory Coast) Pierre Douhou	Peninsula
Salgaocar	(England) David Booth	(Brazil) Luciano Sabrosa	Salgaocar
Shillong Lajong	(India) Thangboi Singto	(India) Renedy Singh	Aircel
Sporting Goa	(Spain) Oscar Bruzon	(India) Matthew Gonsalves	Models
United Sikkim	(Australia) Nathan Hall	(India) Anwar Ali	URO

=== Managerial changes ===
Team	Outgoing manager	Manner of departure	Date of vacancy	Position in table	Incoming manager	Date of appointment
ONGC	(India) Caetano Pinho	Unknown	30 April 2012	Pre-Season	(India) Subrata Bhattacharya	30 April 2012
Pailan Arrows	(India) Sujit Chakravarty	End of tenure as interim manager	7 May 2012	Pre-Season	(Australia) Arthur Papas	24 May 2012
Mohun Bagan	(India) Prasanta Banerjee	Sacked	26 May 2012	Pre-Season	(India) Santosh Kashyap	26 May 2012
Air India	(India) Santosh Kashyap	Signed by Mohun Bagan	26 May 2012	Pre-Season	(India) Godfrey Pereira	3 July 2012
Shillong Lajong	(Scotland) Pradhyum Reddy	Changed to a Head of Youth	8 June 2012	Pre-Season	(Scotland) Desmond Bulpin	8 June 2012
Churchill Brothers	(Brazil) Carlos Roberto Pereira	Did not renew contract	7 May 2012	Pre-Season	(India) Mariano Dias	13 July 2012
Mohun Bagan	(India) Santosh Kashyap	Resigned	13 October 2012	11th (2 games In)	(India) Mridul Banerjee	19 October 2012
Salgaocar	(Morocco) Karim Bencherifa	Resigned	20 October 2012	9th (2 games In)	(India) Peter Vales	20 October 2012
Prayag United	(India) Sanjoy Sen	Resigned	8 November 2012	5th (4 games In)	(Netherlands) Eelco Schattorie	8 November 2012
Salgaocar	(India) Peter Vales	Interem period ended	9 November 2012	9th (4 games In)	(England) David Booth	9 November 2012
United Sikkim	(Belgium) Philippe De Ridder	Changed Post to football director	13 November 2012	11th (5 games In)	(India) Baichung Bhutia	13 November 2012
Mohun Bagan	(India) Mridul Banerjee	Interim period ended	19 November 2012	5th (6 games in)	(Morocco) Karim Bencherifa	19 November 2012
Sporting Goa	(India) Ekendra Singh	Moved to Goalkeeper Coach	3 December 2012	11th (9 games in)	(Spain) Oscar Bruzon	3 December 2012
United Sikkim	(India) Baichung Bhutia	Interim period ended	10 December 2012	12th (10 games in)	(Australia) Nathan Hall	10 December 2012
ONGC	(India) Subrata Bhattacharya	Sacked	18 December 2012	14th (11 games in)	(India) Santosh Kashyap	18 December 2012
Air India	(India) Godfrey Pereira	Resigned	27 December 2012	10th (10 games in)	(India) Anthony Fernandes	30 December 2012
Shillong Lajong	(Scotland) Desmond Bulpin	Sacked	22 January 2013	12th (16 games in)	(India) Thangboi Singto	22 January 2013
Air India	(India) Anthony Fernandes	Interim period ended	2 March 2013	12th (17 games in)	(India) Naushad Moosa	2 March 2013

=== Foreign players ===
Restricting the number of foreign players strictly to four per team, including a slot for a player from AFC countries. A team could use three foreign players on the field each game including a least one player from the AFC country.

Club	Player 1	Player 2	Player 3	Asian Player
Air India	(Nigeria) Henry Ezeh	(Nigeria) Junior Obagbemiro	(Nigeria) Amos Omeje	(Afghanistan) Mujtaba Faiz
Churchill Brothers	(Brazil) Beto	(Gabon) Henry Antchouet	(Senegal) Lamine Tamba	(Afghanistan) Balal Arezou
Dempo	(Liberia) Johnny Menyongar	(Nigeria) Koko Sakibo	None	(Japan) Ryuji Sueoka
East Bengal	(Nigeria) Chidi Edeh	(Nigeria) Uga Okpara	(Nigeria) Penn Orji	(Australia) Andrew Barisic
Mohun Bagan	(Namibia) Quinton Jacobs	(Nigeria) Echezona Anyichie	(Nigeria) Odafe Okolie	(Australia) Tolgay Özbey
Mumbai	(Ghana) Evans Quao	(Ghana) Yusif Yakubu	(Nigeria) David Opara	(Afghanistan) Zohib Amiri
ONGC	(Liberia) Eric Brown	(Nigeria) Muritala Ali	(Nigeria) Hassan Odeola	(Japan) Katsumi Yusa
Pailan Arrows	Pailan Arrows don't use foreigners as they are a Developmental Team			
Prayag United	(Costa Rica) Carlos Hernández	(Nigeria) Ranti Martins	(Nigeria) Bello Razaq	(Japan) (New Zealand) Kayne Vincent (Note: Prayag United are allowed up to four foreign players (per I-League rules), one of which must be from Asia. Despite being a New Zealander and having represented them at youth international level Kayne Vincent is considered Japanese due to his Japanese mother.)
Pune	(Ivory Coast) Pierre Douhou	(Nigeria) Chika Wali	(South Sudan) James Moga	(Australia) Boima Karpeh
Salgaocar	(Brazil) Josimar	(Brazil) Luciano Sabrosa	(Nigeria) O. J. Obatola	(Singapore) John Wilkinson
Shillong Lajong	(Japan) Sho Kamimura	(Japan) Taisuke Matsugae	(Portugal) Edinho Júnior	(North Korea) Minchol Son
Sporting Goa	(Nigeria) Ogba Kalu Nnanna	(Spain) Ángel Berlanga	(Spain) Juanfri	(Japan) Seiya Sugishita
United Sikkim	(Guam) John Landa	(Nigeria) Salau Nuruddin	(Spain) Pablo Rodríguez	(Australia) Steve Hayes

== League table ==
Pos	Team	Pld	W	D	L	GF	GA	GD	Pts	Qualification or relegation
1	Churchill Brothers (C)	26	16	7	3	56	22	+34	55	Qualification for 2014 AFC Cup group stage
2	Pune	26	16	4	6	53	26	+27	52	Qualification for 2014 AFC Champions League qualifying play-off (Note: Pune were chosen to represent India in the AFC Champions League as they passed the club licensing requirements.)
3	East Bengal	26	13	8	5	44	18	+26	47	
4	Prayag United	26	13	5	8	55	35	+20	44	
5	Dempo	26	11	7	8	45	33	+12	40	
6	Sporting Goa	26	9	8	9	36	41	−5	35	
7	Salgaocar	26	9	6	11	34	29	+5	33	
8	Mumbai	26	8	8	10	36	42	−6	32	
9	ONGC (R)	26	7	10	9	30	40	−10	31	Excluded (Note: ONGC and Air India were expelled from I-League because they failed to meet Asian Football Confederation's licensing criteria.)
10	Mohun Bagan	26	11	8	7	40	34	+6	29 (Note: On 29 December 2012, Mohun Bagan failed to turn up in the second half of the match against East Bengal due to crowd trouble; their record was expunged, with their remaining fixtures scratched, and they were banned from the I-League for until 2015 by the I-League core committee. On 15 January 2013, Mohun Bagan appealed the decision to ban them from the league and were reinstated, but would start on 0 points.)	
11	Shillong Lajong	26	6	10	10	26	40	−14	28	
12	Pailan Arrows	26	6	5	15	25	45	−20	23	
13	Air India (R)	26	4	7	15	28	63	−35	19	Excluded
14	United Sikkim (R)	26	2	9	15	23	63	−40	15	Relegation to 2014 I-League 2nd Division

Source: IndiaFooty.com
Rules for classification: 1) points; 2) goal difference; 3) number of goals scored.
(C) Champions; (R) Relegated

== Results ==
Home \ Away	AI	CB	DEM	EB	MB	MUM	ONGC	PA	USC	PFC	SFC	SLFC	SCG	USFC
Air India		0–3	2–1	0–3	0–1	4–1	1–2	1–1	1–4	0–6	1–1	1–1	1–1	3–3
Churchill Brothers	3–0		2–2	0–3	1–1	3–1	5–0	3–1	2–2	2–1	2–1	6–0	8–4	2–1
Dempo	1–0	2–1		2–2	3–0	2–2	1–1	0–2	3–1	1–5	2–1	4–1	0–1	7–0
East Bengal	1–1	0–3	1–1		3–0	2–0	5–0	3–0	0–1	1–0	1–0	0–1	1–1	6–0
Mohun Bagan	3–2	0–2	2–1	0–0		3–2	3–1	2–0	1–2	1–3	3–0	2–2	3–1	0–0
Mumbai	3–1	0–0	0–0	2–1	1–1		1–0	1–1	2–1	0–3	0–1	4–1	3–2	1–0
ONGC	2–4	1–1	3–1	1–0	0–0	1–1		3–0	1–1	0–1	1–0	3–0	2–2	1–1
Pailan Arrows	2–1	0–3	1–2	1–2	2–3	3–2	4–1		1–2	0–2	1–2	1–0	0–2	1–1
Prayag United	5–1	1–2	1–0	2–2	1–1	2–3	3–1	4–1		2–0	1–1	2–0	1–3	10–1
Pune	4–0	0–1	2–0	1–2	2–2	3–2	3–2	2–0	3–1		0–2	2–2	0–0	2–2
Salgaocar	4–0	0–0	1–2	1–4	2–0	1–0	0–0	0–0	1–0	0–2		2–0	1–3	9–0
Shillong Lajong	2–2	0–1	0–0	0–0	2–0	2–0	1–1	3–1	3–2	1–2	1–1		1–2	2–1
Sporting Goa	0–1	1–0	0–5	0–0	1–5	2–2	1–1	0–1	1–2	1–2	2–0	0–0		2–1
United Sikkim	5–0	0–0	1–2	0–1	0–3	2–2	0–1	0–0	0–1	1–2	3–2	0–0	0–3	

Source: I-League
Legend: Blue = home team win; Yellow = draw; Red = away team win.

== Statistical leaders ==
=== Top scorers ===
As of 12 May 2013

Rank	Player	Club	Goals
1	(Nigeria) Ranti Martins	Prayag United	26
2	(Nigeria) Odafe Onyeka Okolie	Mohun Bagan	19
3	(Nigeria) Chidi Edeh	East Bengal	18
4	(South Sudan) James Moga	Pune	16
5	(Gabon) Henry Antchouet	Churchill Brothers	14
6	(Brazil) Beto	Churchill Brothers	13
7	(Nigeria) Ogba Kalu Nnanna	Sporting Goa	11
7	(Japan) Ryuji Sueoka	Dempo	11
9	(Lebanon) Akram Moghrabi	Churchill Brothers	10
9	(Ghana) Yusif Yakubu	Mumbai	10
9	(Australia) Tolgay Özbey	Mohun Bagan	10

=== Top Indian Scorers ===
As of 12 May 2013

Rank	Player	Club	Goals
1	(India) C.K. Vineeth	Prayag United	7
2	(India) Joaquim Abranches	Dempo	6
2	(India) Bineesh Balan	Churchill Brothers	6
2	(India) Francis Fernandes	Salgaocar	6
5	(India) Peter Carvalho	Dempo	5
5	(India) Dawson Fernandes	Sporting Goa	5
5	(India) Arata Izumi	Pune	5
5	(India) Jeje Lalpekhlua	Pune	5
5	(India) Holicharan Narzary	Pailan Arrows	5
5	(India) Clifford Miranda	Dempo	5
5	(India) Sushil Kumar Singh	Shillong Lajong	5
5	(India) Milan Singh	Pailan Arrows	5
5	(India) Lalrindika Ralte	East Bengal	5

=== Hattricks ===
Player	For	Against	Result	Round	Date
(Nigeria) Ranti Martins	Prayag United	Air India	5–1	1	7 October 2012
(Lebanon) Akram Moghrabi	Churchill Brothers	ONGC	5–0	2	11 October 2012
(Nigeria) Odafe Onyeka Okolie	Mohun Bagan	Sporting Goa	3–1	4	4 November 2012
(Nigeria) Ranti Martins (Note: Martins scored 5 goals in this match.)	Prayag United	United Sikkim	10–1	5	10 November 2012
(India) Bineesh Balan	Churchill Brothers	Sporting Goa	8–4	11	16 December 2012
(Nigeria) Chidi Edeh	East Bengal	Salgaocar	4–1	14	5 January 2013
(Nigeria) Koko Sakibo	Dempo	United Sikkim	7–0	17	19 January 2013
(India) C.K. Vineeth	Prayag United	Air India	4–1	19	2 February 2013
(Nigeria) Odafe Onyeka Okolie	Mohun Bagan	Sporting Goa	5–1	23	7 April 2013
(Brazil) Josimar	Salgaocar	United Sikkim	9–0	24	13 April 2013
