= Evans Quao =

Ghanaian footballer (born 1990)

Personal information
- Date of birth: 11 May 1990 (age 36)
- Place of birth: Ghana
- Height: 1.87 m (6 ft 2 in)
- Position: Defensive midfielder

Senior career*
Years	Team	Apps	(Gls)
2010–2011	Mumbai		(2)
2012–2013	Mumbai	24	(0)
2013–2015	Medeama		
2016–2017	Asante Kotoko	13	(0)
- * Club domestic league appearances and goals as of 21 June 2017

Evans Quao (born 11 May 1990) is a Ghanaian footballer who most recently played as a defender for Asante Kotoko in the First Capital Plus Premier League.

== Career ==
=== Mumbai ===
Quao played for Mumbai F.C. in the I-League during the 2009-10 and 2010-11 season but however left the club at the end of the season. Then on 12 July 2012 it was officially confirmed that Quao had re-signed with Mumbai F.C. for the 2012-13 I-League season. During his first spell at the club Quao scored two goals. His first goal occurred on 1 May 2010 against Viva Kerala in which he helped Mumbai win 1–0. He then scored his second goal for the club on 13 February 2011 against Air India FC as Mumbai won 1–0.

== Career statistics ==
=== Club ===
Statistics accurate as of 1 February 2013

Club	Season	League		Federation Cup		Durand Cup		AFC		Total	
Club	Season	Apps	Goals	Apps	Goals	Apps	Goals	Apps	Goals	Apps	Goals
Mumbai	2012-13	16	3	0	0	0	0	—	—	16	3
Career total		16	3	0	0	0	0	0	0	16	3
