= 2019 Nadkarni Cup =

Nadkarni Cup
- Season: 2019
- Teams: 16
- Champions: Air India
- All statistics correct as of 21 August 2019.

The 2019 Nadkarni Cup is the 112th season of the Nadkarni Cup, a football competition played in Mumbai, Indiain state of Maharashtra. The 16 teams will play the tournament. The cup will commence from 21 August 2019.

== Teams ==
A total of 16 teams are participating in this year's competition. 11 teams from MDFA Elite Division and 5 from MDFA Super Division.

MDFA Elite Division

- Air India
- Century Rayon
- Central Bank Of India
- Companeros
- FSI - Sea View
- HDFC Bank
- Karnatak Sporting Association
- Millat FC
- Mumbai Customs
- Rhema S.F
- Union Bank Of India

MDFA Super Division

- Atlanta FC
- Bank Of Baroda
- Iron Born - CFCI (U18)
- Kenkre FC (U18)
- Mumbai City (U18)

== Group stage ==
Tiebreakers
The teams are ranked according to points (3 points for a win, 1 point for a draw, 0 points for a loss). If two or more teams are equal on points on completion of the group matches, the following criteria are applied in the order given to determine the rankings:
1. Greater number of points obtained in the matches between the Teams concerned
2. Goal difference resulting from the matches between the Teams concerned
3. Greater number of goals scored in the matches between the Teams concerned
4. Goal difference in all the matches
5. Greater number of goals scored in all the matches
6. Drawing of lots

=== Group A ===
Pos	Team	Pld	W	D	L	GF	GA	GD	Pts	Qualification or relegation
1	Century Rayon	3	3	0	0	11	2	+9	9	Quarter Finals
2	Karnatak Sporting Association	3	2	0	1	6	3	+3	6	Quarter Finals
3	Iron Born - CFCI (U18)	3	0	1	2	0	5	−5	1	
4	Atlanta FC	3	0	1	2	3	9	−6	1	

Rules for classification: Group stage tiebreakers

21 August 2019
16:00

Atlanta FC	0-0	Iron Born - CFCI

Cooperage Ground, Mumbai

23 August 2019
14:00

Karnatak Sporting Association	1-2	Century Rayon
Allan Dias 42'		V. Luikham 64'; Sagar Bedekar 75'

Cooperage Ground, Mumbai

26 August 2019
16:00

Karnatak Sporting Association	2-1	Iron Born - CFCI
Pawan Mali 27'; Roger Sam 62'		Aman Mangani 5'

Cooperage Ground, Mumbai

27 August 2019
14:00

Century Rayon	6-1	Atlanta FC
Zingshepam Lungleng 45'; Venkatesh Tolimala 53'; Sheng Sheng 64'; Sunil Mani 83'; Janal Kumar Mandvi 91'; Thalchan Vashum 93'		Aditya Kerkar 80'

Cooperage Ground, Mumbai

1 September 2019
14:00

Iron Born - CFCI	0-3	Century Rayon

Cooperage Ground, Mumbai

1 September 2019
16:00

Karnatak Sporting Association	3-2	Atlanta FC

Cooperage Ground, Mumbai

=== Group B ===
Pos	Team	Pld	W	D	L	GF	GA	GD	Pts	Qualification or relegation
1	HDFC Bank	3	2	1	0	8	2	+6	7	Quarter Finals
2	Mumbai Customs	3	2	1	0	5	2	+3	7	Quarter Finals
3	Bank Of Baroda	3	1	0	2	2	6	−4	3	
4	Central Bank Of India	3	0	0	3	1	6	−5	0	

Rules for classification: Group stage tiebreakers

23 August 2019
16:00

Bank Of Baroda	0-1	Mumbai Customs
		Dhawal Waghela 49'

Cooperage Ground, Mumbai

24 August 2019
14:00

HDFC Bank	2-0	Central Bank Of India
Ramesh Singh 54'; Prashant Rane 64'

Cooperage Ground, Mumbai

28 August 2019
14:00

Central Bank Of India	0-1	Bank Of Baroda
		Kevin Fernandes 88'

Cooperage Ground, Mumbai

28 August 2019
16:00

HDFC Bank	1-1	Mumbai Customs
Melchoir Fernandes 59'		Hekmat Singh 93'

Cooperage Ground, Mumbai

2 September 2019
14:00

HDFC Bank	5-1	Bank Of Baroda

Cooperage Ground, Mumbai

2 September 2019
16:00

Mumbai Customs	3-1	Central Bank Of India

Cooperage Ground, Mumbai

=== Group C ===
Pos	Team	Pld	W	D	L	GF	GA	GD	Pts	Qualification or relegation
1	Air India	3	3	0	0	11	1	+10	9	Quarter Finals
2	Mumbai City (U18)	3	2	0	1	8	3	+5	6	Quarter Finals
3	Millat FC	3	0	1	2	2	7	−5	1	
4	FSI -Sea View	3	0	1	2	1	11	−10	1	

Rules for classification: Group stage tiebreakers

24 August 2019
16:00

Millat FC	1-1	FSI – Sea View
Tarique Ansari 2'		Abhishek Bhopale 77'

Cooperage Ground, Mumbai

25 August 2019
16:00

Air India	2-1	Mumbai City U-18
Sanchit Singh 4'; Rosenberg Gabriel 90'		Shreyas Vatekar 9'

Cooperage Ground, Mumbai

29 August 2019
14:00

Air India	2-0	Millat FC
Sumesh Nair 40'; Johnson D’silva 70'

Cooperage Ground, Mumbai

30 August 2019
14:00

Mumbai City U-18	3-0	FSI – Sea View
Twain Fernandes 5'; Abel Fernandes 8'; Izaan Shaikh 69'

Cooperage Ground, Mumbai

3 September 2019
15:00

Air India	7-0	FSI – Sea View
Rosenberg Gabriel 20' 30'; Ashiqe Mohammed 23'; Rishikesh Shinde 68' 76' 83'; Johnson D’ Silva 78'

Cooperage Ground, Mumbai

5 September 2019
14:00

Millat FC	1-4	Mumbai City U-18

Neville D'souza Ground, Mumbai

=== Group D ===
Pos	Team	Pld	W	D	L	GF	GA	GD	Pts	Qualification or relegation
1	Union Bank Of India	3	3	0	0	14	0	+14	9	Quarter Finals
2	Rhema S.F	3	2	0	1	4	4	0	6	Quarter Finals
3	Companeros	2	0	0	2	0	4	−4	0	
4	Kenkre FC (U18)	2	0	0	2	0	10	−10	0	

Rules for classification: Group stage tiebreakers

25 August 2019
14:00

Kenkre (U18)	0-2	Rhema S.F
		Hari Saini 16'; Ehtesham Mujawar 86'

Cooperage Ground, Mumbai

26 August 2019
14:00

Union Bank Of India	2-0	Companeros
Sherwyn Chang 25'; Pradeep Mannewar 75'

Cooperage Ground, Mumbai

30 August 2019
16:00

Rhema S.F	2-0	Companeros
Hari Saini 60'; Vasant Thapa 68'

Cooperage Ground, Mumbai

31 August 2019
14:00

Union Bank Of India	8-0	Kenkre (U18)
Pradeep Mannewar 14' 16' 75'; Hasan Golwalla 30'; Vallentine Pereira 35' 53' 67'; Jay Wadhwa 50'

Cooperage Ground, Mumbai

7 September 2019
16:00

Companeros	Abandoned	Kenkre (U18)

Cooperage Ground, Mumbai

5 September 2019
16:00

Union Bank Of India	4-0	Rhema S.F
Elvin Fernandes 23' 91'; Jay Wadhwa 35'; Athang Kanekar 53'

Cooperage Ground, Mumbai

== Knockout stage ==
=== Bracket ===
Quarter-Finals
Century Rayon	3(2)
Mumbai Customs	3(4)
Air India	7
Rhema S.F	0
Karnatak Sporting Association	0(4)
HDFC Bank	0(5)
Mumbai City (U18)	2
Union Bank Of India	1

Semi-Finals
Mumbai Customs	0
Air India	2
HDFC Bank	4
Mumbai City (U18)	2

Final
Air India	2
HDFC Bank	1

=== Quarter-finals ===
6 September 2019
14:00 IST

Century Rayon	3-3	Mumbai Customs
Penalties
	2-4

Cooperage Ground, Mumbai

6 September 2019
16:00 IST

Karnatak Sporting Association	0-0	HDFC Bank
Penalties
	4-5

Cooperage Ground, Mumbai

7 September 2019
14:00 IST

Air India	7-0	Rhema S.F

Cooperage Ground, Mumbai

7 September 2019
16:00 IST

Mumbai City (U18)	2-1	Union Bank Of India

Cooperage Ground, Mumbai

=== Semi-finals ===
9 September 2019
14:00 IST

HDFC Bank	4-2	Mumbai City (U18)

Cooperage Ground, Mumbai

9 September 2019
16:00 IST

Mumbai Customs	0-2	Air India

Cooperage Ground, Mumbai

== Final ==
14 September 2019
18:00

Air India	2-1	HDFC Bank

Cooperage Ground, Mumbai

== Goalscrores ==
4 goals

- Pradeep Mannewar (Union Bank Of India)

3 goals

- Vallentine Pereira (Union Bank Of India)
- Rosenberg Gabriel (Air India)
- Rishikesh Shinde (Air India)

2 goals

- (India) Hari Saini (Rhema S.F)
- Johnson D'silva (Air India)
- Elvin Fernandes (Union Bank Of India)
- Jay Wadhwa (Union Bank Of India)

1 goal

- (India) Allan Dias (Karnatak Sporting Association)
- (India) V. Luikham (Century Rayon)
- (India) Sagar Bedkar (Century Rayon)
- (India) Pawan Mali (Karnatak Sporting Association)
- (India) Roger Sam (Karnatak Sporting Association)
- (India) Aman Mangani (Iron Born - CFCI)
- (India) Zingshepam Lungleng (Century Rayon)
- (India) Venkatesh Tolimala (Century Rayon)
- (India) Sheng Sheng (Century Rayon)
- (India) Sunil Mani (Century Rayon)
- (India) Janal Kumar Mandvi (Century Rayon)
- (India) Thalchan Vashum (Century Rayon))
- (India) Dhawal Waghela (Mumbai Customs)
- (India) Ramesh Singh (HDFC Bank)
- (India) Prashant Rane (HDFC Bank)
- (India) Kevin Fernandes (Bank Of Baroda)
- (India) Melchoir Fernandes (HDFC Bank)
- (India) Hekmat Singh (Mumbai Customs)
- (India) Tarique Ansari (Millat FC)
- (India) Abhishek Bhopale (FSI – Sea View)
- Sanchit Singh (Air India)
- (India) Shreyas Vatekar (Mumbai City U-18)
- Sumesh Nair (Air India)
- (India) Twain Fernandes (Mumbai City U-18)
- (India) Abel Fernandes (Mumbai City U-18)
- (India) Izaan Shaikh (Mumbai City U-18)
- (India) Ehtesham Mujawar (Rhema S.F)
- Sherwyn Chang (Union Bank Of India)
- (India) Vasant Thapa (Rhema S.F)
- Hasan Golwalla (Union Bank Of India)
- Ashiqe Mohammed (Air India)
- Athang Kanekar (Union Bank Of India)
