= Justin Stephen =

Indian footballer (born 1988)

Personal information
- Full name: Justin Stephen
- Date of birth: 28 January 1988 (age 38)
- Place of birth: Kottayam, Kerala, India
- Height: 1.85 m (6 ft 1 in)
- Position: Centre back

Team information
- Current team: DSK Shivajians (on loan from Mumbai)
- Number: 4

Senior career*
Years	Team	Apps	(Gls)
2007–2010	Mahindra United		
2010–2012	Prayag United		
2012–2013	Mumbai	22	(2)
2013–2014	Mohammedan	3	(0)
2014–	Mumbai	17	(1)
2015	→ Chennaiyin (loan)	0	(0)
2016–	DSK Shivajians	2	(0)
- * Club domestic league appearances and goals as of 21:18, 22 January 2016 (UTC)

Justin Stephen (born 1988) is an Indian footballer who played as a centre back.

== Early career ==
Justin is born and raised in Uzhavoor, Kottayam. He completed his studies at OLLHS, Uzhavoor and went for further studies at Christ College. He began his football career with the Unity Soccer Club in Thodupuzha and later went on to play for his college side of Christ College.

== Career ==
Justin's signed for football team Viva Kerala in 2006 during their pursuit for top division football. After one year, he was signed by Mumbai based club, Mahindra United. Justin played at the club until the club went defunct in 2010. He was signed by Chirag United and played for the team for a further two seasons. In 2012, he signed for Mumbai F.C. for the remainder of the 2012-13 season. The following season, he joined Mohammedan S.C. Justin re-signed for Mumbai F.C. in 2014. In July 2015, Stephen was drafted to play for Tamil Nadu club Chennaiyin in the 2015 Indian Super League.

== Personal life ==
Stephen is a supporter of the Brazil national football team and considers English player John Terry as his role model. Indian He is the brother of Indian film producer, Listin Stephen. In addition to his footballer career, Justin worked as a producer for his brother's production studio Magic Frames.
