= Nathan Hall (football coach) =

Australian footballer (born 1985)

Personal information
- Full name: Nathan Hall
- Date of birth: 16 April 1985 (age 41)
- Place of birth: Sydney, Australia

Managerial career
- Years: Team
- 2012–2013: United Sikkim
- 2013: Abahani Limited
- 2014: Amicale

Nathan Hall (born 16 April 1985 in Sydney, Australia) is a former Australian association footballer and current manager.

== Coaching career ==
Hall started coaching at a young age and started out with minor roles with state league clubs Sutherland Sharks FC and the APIA Leichhardt Tigers Under-20s soccer team. However, after failing to get a main head coaching role or an assistant role at an A-League or state league levels in Australia Hall signed up as an assistant coach for Thai Premier League side Thai Port under the head coaching of former Thailand international Sasom Pobprasert. In order to get noticed by Thai Port, Hall had to send two versions of his letters to the clubs in both English and Thai, he did this with the help of a friend who also helped him gain seven interviews which Hall paid for himself. Hall had been quoted during his time at the club and how honored he was to be given the opportunity by saying "When Sasom gave me the contract, I was obviously excited, but also very honoured. He has taught me so much about Thai football, and has given me the opportunity to be involved in one of Asia's top clubs. I have learnt a lot." Hall also credited former assistant coach to the Thailand national team, Steve Darby, with helping him adjust to being in Thailand and helping Hall improve as a coach. Hall also said that eventually he would like to have a head coaching role in the A-League after he increases his experience as an assistant or head coach abroad.

=== United Sikkim ===
In November 2012 it was initially reported that Indian I-League club United Sikkim F.C. had started talks with Hall about a possible head coaching role at the club. On 10 December 2012 it was officially confirmed by United Sikkim that Hall had joined the club as its new head coach, replacing interim player-coach Baichung Bhutia. His first game as head coach of the club in the league came on 15 December against Mumbai at the Balewadi Sports Complex in which United Sikkim lost 0–1. Hall then managed to earn his first point as head coach in his next match against ONGC on 29 December in which his side drew 1–1 at the Ambedkar Stadium with Nadong Bhutia scoring the first goal for United Sikkim under Hall.

United Sikkim did not win a single game under Hall until 27 March 2013 in which his side managed a 5–0 victory over forced-relegated side Air India at the Paljor Stadium. This would turn out to be United Sikkim's last win and points for the rest of the season as the side lost its last four matches after this one and were thus relegated to the I-League 2nd Division.

=== Abahani Limited ===
Hall was signed as head coach of Abahani Limited of the Bangladesh Premier League before the 2013–14 season. However, Hall was sacked as coach after 32 days, before he even led the club in a competitive match.

=== Amicale ===
On 29 January 2014 it was confirmed that Hall had signed for Amicale F.C. of the Vanuatu Premia Divisen as the side prepares for the 2013–14 OFC Champions League. He earned his first victory with the club on 8 February 2014 in the league against Ifira Black Bird.

== Statistics ==
=== Coach ===
Since 9 February 2014

Team	From	To	Record				
Team	From	To	G	W	D	L	Win %
(India) United Sikkim	10 December 2012	May 2013	19	1	4	14	5.26
(Bangladesh) Abahani Limited	3 October 2013	21 November 2013	0	0	0	0	—
(Vanuatu) Amicale	29 January 2014	Present	8	3	3	2	37.50
Total			27	4	7	16	14.81
