= Naushad Moosa =

Indian footballer and manager

Personal information
- Full name: Naushad Moosa
- Date of birth: 2 October 1971 (age 55)
- Place of birth: Maharashtra, India
- Height: 1.88 m (6 ft 2 in)
- Position: Defender

Team information
- Current team: India U23 (head coach); NorthEast United (assistant)

Senior career*
Years	Team	Apps	(Gls)
1988–1992	East Bengal	84	(8)
1992–2000	Mahindra United	246	(12)
2000–2002	Mohammedan	44	(6)
2002–2006	Air India	96	(12)
Total		470	(38)

International career
1994–2000	India	42	(4)

Managerial career
- 2008–2012: Mumbai (youth coach)
- 2012–2013: Air India
- 2013–2016: Pune (youth coach)
- 2017–2022: Bengaluru B
- 2021–2023: Bengaluru (assistant)
- 2023–: NorthEast United (assistant)
- 2025–: India U23
- 2026: India (interim)
Medal record
Men's football
Representing India (as player)
SAFF Championship
Winner	1997 Nepal
Runner-up	1995 Sri Lanka
Representing India (as manager)
SAFF Championship
Winner	2026 Bangladesh
- * Club domestic league appearances and goals

Naushad Moosa (born 2 October 1971) is an Indian football coach and former footballer who is currently serving as the head coach of the India national under-23 football team. He is also the assistant manager, head coach of the reserve team, and head of youth development of Indian Super League club NorthEast United. He also served as the interim manager of India during the 2026 SAFF Championship.

During his playing days, Moosa played for East Bengal, Mahindra United, and Mohammedan in the National Football League and I-League. He also represented India from 1994 to 1998.

== Playing career ==
Moosa began his football career as a player with East Bengal who he played for in the National Football League. On 9 November 1997 Moosa played a part in East Bengal's historic victory over J. League Division 1 side Verdy Kawasaki in the Asian Cup Winners Cup in which a Samuel Omollo's goal in the 61st minute led to East Bengal winning the match 1–0 at the Salt Lake Stadium, however East Bengal were still out of the tournament as Verdy won the first leg of the two-legged event by a score of 5–2. Thirteen days later however, Mossa again made history with East Bengal as he helped the Kolkata club win the IFA Shield over KBL-FC Kochi in which East Bengal won 3–2 at the Salt Lake Stadium.

Moosa's time however at East Bengal officially ended in 1998 when he signed for Mumbai based club, Mahindra & Mahindra. While at Mahindra & Mahindra Moosa failed to reach the same success that he enjoyed at East Bengal. His biggest chance at silverware at Mahindra & Mahindra came on 12 November 2000 when Mahindra & Mahindra were in the final of the 2000 Durand Cup in which they had to face Mohun Bagan but an extra-time golden goal from R.C. Prakash saw the match end in Bagan's favor 2–1.

== Coaching career ==
=== Air India: 2013 ===
After Godfrey Pereira resigned as head coach of Air India of the I-League, Moosa was signed to replace him in February 2013. His first match in charge took place on 3 March 2013 against ONGC. Despite Air India taking the lead in the 41st minute, ONGC came back to win 2–1. He would fail to get Air India a single victory during his short three months stint with the club as Air India eventually finished 13th, in the relegation zone, at the end of the season.

=== Pune FC: 2013–16 ===
Moosa managed youth team of Pune FC Under his coaching Pune FC Academy won two I-League U20 titles in 2012 and 2013. He also led the team to Pune Football League title in 2016.

=== Bengaluru FC: 2017–2023 ===
On 29 June 2017 it was announced that Moosa would join Bengaluru FC as assistant coach and head coach of the club's reserve side.

On 6 January 2021 after the sacking of Carles Cuadrat, Moosa became the interim head coach of Bengaluru.

On 12 June 2021, Moosa signed a new three-year contract with the club, thus allowing the club to keep him till 2024

=== Northeast United FC: 2023–present ===
In 2023, Moosa joined Northeast United along with then Bengaluru FC technical director Mandar Tamahne and is serving as the assistant coach of Juan Benali.

== Statistics ==
=== Managerial statistics ===
As of 29 June 2017.

Team	From	To	Record				
Team	From	To	G	W	D	L	Win %
Air India	3 March 2013	12 May 2013	9	0	1	8	0.00
Total			9	0	1	8	0.00

== Honours ==
India

- SAFF Championship: 1997; runner-up: 1995

Maharashtra

- Santosh Trophy: 1999–2000
