= List of Air India FC seasons =

Air India Football Club is an Indian professional association football club based in Mumbai. The club was formed in Mumbai in 1952 by Air India.

Air India have never won the League championship, nor the Federation Cup. They were, though, the winners of the 1999–2000 National Football League Second Division.

== History ==
Air India FC has been playing in the Premier Harwood League since 1980. The team though qualified for the National Football League in 1995. In 1996 the club finished 6th in the League and then 5th in 1997.

After being relegated to the second division in 1998, Air India paved their way back into the first division the next year and played in the National Football League in 2000 as well. The years 2001 to 2004 saw Air India going through a tough phase as they were playing in the second division. In 2005 the team qualified to the National Football League first division and then 2007 saw Air India finishing 7th and were the Mumbai Harwood Champions in 2005.

== Key ==
- P = Played
- W = Games won
- D = Games drawn
- L = Games lost
- F = Goals for
- A = Goals against
- Pts = Points
- Pos = Final position
- Div 1 = National Football League
- Div 2 = National Football League Second Division
- IL = I-League
- F = Final
- Group = Group stage
- R16 = Round of 16
- QF = Quarter-finals
- R1 = Round 1
- R2 = Round 2
- R3 = Round 3
- R4 = Round 4
- R5 = Round 5
- R6 = Round 6
- SF = Semi-finals

1st or W	Winners
2nd or RU	Runners-up
↑	Promoted
↓	Relegated
♦	Top scorer in division

== Seasons ==
Results of league and cup competitions by season
Season	Division	P	W	D	L	F	A	Pts	Pos	Federation Cup	Super Cup	Asia	Round reached	Name	Goals
Season	League									Federation Cup	Super Cup	Asia	Round reached	Top goalscorer	
1996-97	Div 1	19	6	7	6	18	22	25	6th	—	—	—	—	—	—
1997-98	Div 1	18	6	8	4	18	16	26	5th	—	—	—	—	—	—
1998-99	Div 1	10	2	1	7	5	17	7	11th	—	—	—	—	—	—
1999-2000	Div 2	—	—	—	—	—	—	—	—	—	—	—	—	—	—
2000-01	Div 1	22	5	6	11	25	32	21	11th	—	—	—	—	—	—
2001-02	Div 2	—	—	—	—	—	—	—	—	—	—	—	—	—	—
2002-03	Div 2	—	—	—	—	—	—	—	—	—	—	—	—	—	—
2003-04	Div 2	—	—	—	—	—	—	—	—	—	—	—	—	—	—
2004-05	Div 2	—	—	—	—	—	—	—	—	—	—	—	—	—	—
2005-06	Div 1	17	5	4	8	16	22	19	7th	—	—	—	—	—	—
2006-07	Div 1	18	4	9	5	20	23	21	7th	—	—	—	—	—	—
2007-08	IL	18	3	8	7	10	20	17	8th	R1	—	—	—	Bashiree Abbas	4
2008-09	IL	22	5	9	8	21	26	24	10th	GS	—	—	—	Sunhash Singh	7
2009-10	IL	26	7	7	12	28	46	28	12th	GS	—	—	—	N. D. Opara	10
2010-11	IL	26	5	9	12	25	57	24	12th	GS	—	—	—	Okorogor Praise	11
2011–12	IL	26	9	5	12	29	37	32	9th	GS	—	—	—	Manandeep Singh; Sandesh Gadkari	7
