= Yusuf Ibrahim (footballer) =

Nigerian footballer (born 1986)

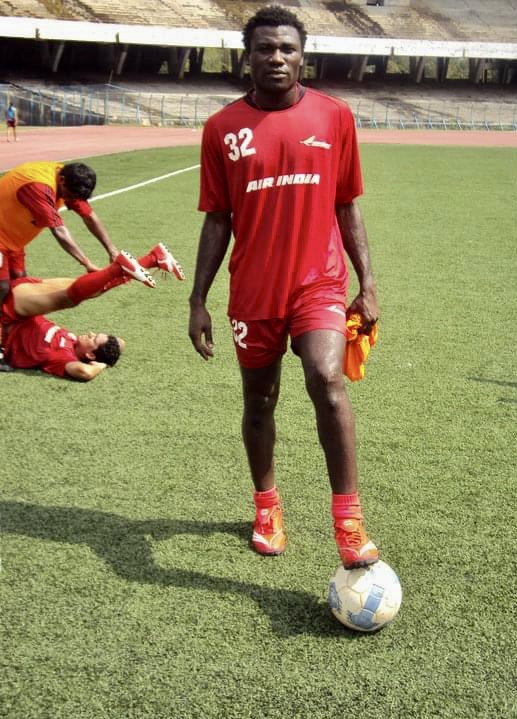
- Ibrahim with Air India

Personal information
- Full name: Yusuf Ibrahim Tijani
- Date of birth: 10 June 1986 (age 40)
- Place of birth: Lagos, Nigeria
- Height: 1.88 m (6 ft 2 in)
- Position: Midfielder

Yusuf Ibrahim (born 10 June 1986) is a Nigerian former professional footballer.

== Career ==
Ibrahim started his football career with Elyon United in Nigeria. He played for several clubs across Africa and Asia, most notably Shooting Stars SC, Hòa Phát Hà Nội FC in Vietnam, Mumbai United and Air India FC in India, and Club Valencia on Maldives. Ibrahim currently has the AIFF certified coaching license.
