= James Dissiramah =

Ghanaian footballer

Personal information
- Full name: James Cobblah Dissiramah
- Date of birth: 13 September 1983 (age 43)
- Place of birth: Accra, Ghana
- Height: 6 ft 1 in (1.85 m)
- Position: Defender

Team information
- Current team: Si Sa Ket
- Number: 15

Youth career
- 1998–1999: University of Ghana

Senior career*
Years	Team	Apps	(Gls)
2000–2007	Liberty Professionals FC		
2007–2009	Mumbai FC	26	(0)
2009	Stay Cool Professionals	30	(5)
2010	Club Valencia		
2011	Liberty Professionals FC		
2011	Sisaket F.C.		
2012–2014	Liberty Professionals FC		

International career
2006	Ghana	3	(0)
- * Club domestic league appearances and goals

James Cobblah Dissiramah (born 13 September 1983 in Accra) is a Ghanaian football player, he currently plays for Sisaket F.C.

== Career ==
Dissiramah began his career with Liberty Professionals FC and was signed on 19 October 2007 from Mumbai FC, after a successful trial with Indian club On 30 September 2009 his contract with Mumbai FC was not renewed and he left India to sign for Ghanaian club Stay Cool Professionals. He played than a year with Maldives top club Club Valencia, before in January 2011 returned to Liberty Professionals FC. Dissiramah signed in Mai 2011 with Thai Premier League side Sisaket F.C. and played his debut on 14 May against Thai Port F.C.

== International career ==
He previously captained the Ghanaian national football team and represented his country at the African Nations Cup and Topfo Cup.

== Honours ==
- 2006: Panasonic Best Player Award
