= Josimar (footballer, born 1984) =

Brazilian footballer (born 1984)

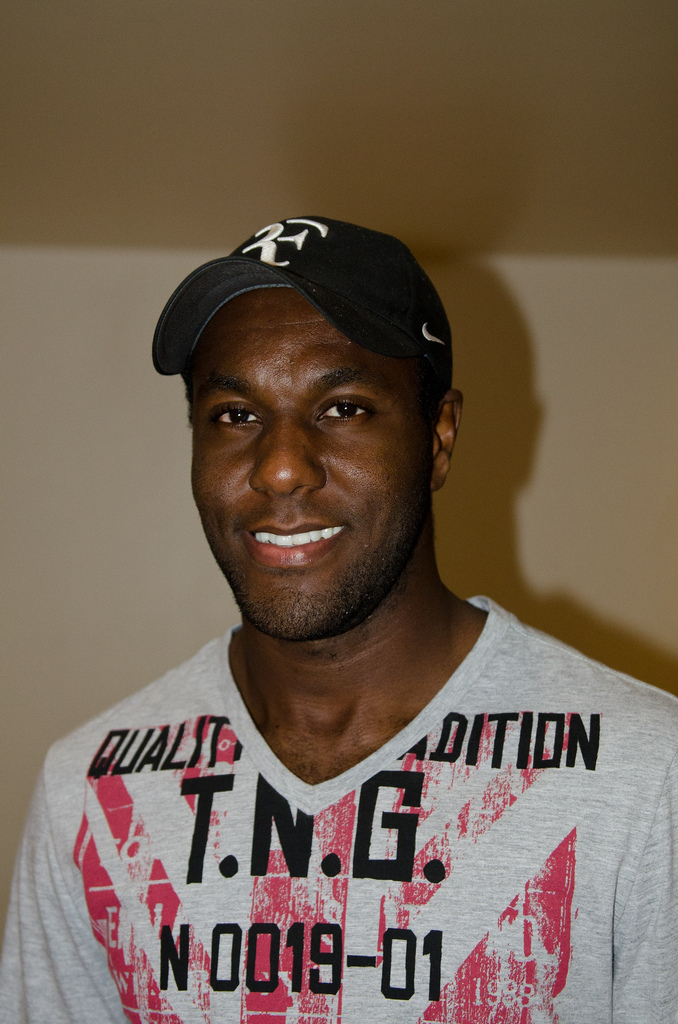

Personal information
- Full name: Josimar da Silva Martins
- Date of birth: 27 September 1984 (age 42)
- Place of birth: Brazil
- Height: 1.91 m (6 ft 3 in)
- Position: Striker

Senior career*
Years	Team	Apps	(Gls)
2007–2008	Ponte Preta		
2008–2009	Clube de Regatas Brasil		
2009	National AC		
2009–2012	United SC		(34)
2013	Salgaocar	9	(6)
2013–2014	Mohammedan	22	(13)
2014–2015	Mumbai	19	(8)
2015–2016	Dempo		
- * Club domestic league appearances and goals as of 11:21, 19 November 2015 (UTC)

Josimar da Silva Martins simply known as Josimar is a Brazilian footballer who last played for Dempo.

== Career ==
=== Club ===
In October 2014, Josimar signed for Mumbai.

In October 2015, Josimar signed for Dempo.

== Career statistics ==
=== Club ===
As of 30 May 2015

Club	Season	League		Cup		AFC		Other		Total	
Club	Season	Apps	Goals	Apps	Goals	Apps	Goals	Apps	Goals	Apps	Goals
Salgaocar	2012–13	9	6	0	0	-	-	-	-	9	6
Mohammedan	2013–14	23	13	3	2	-	-	-	-	26	15
Mumbai	2014–15	19	8	1	1	-	-	-	-	20	9
Career total		40	22	4	3	0	0	8	11	52	36
