= Allan Dias (Indian footballer) =

Indian footballer (born 1986)

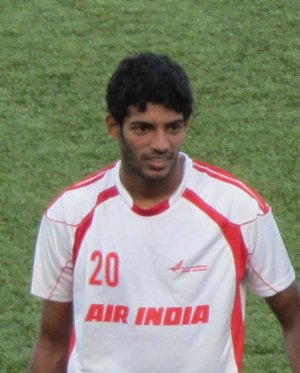

Personal information
- Date of birth: 17 December 1986 (age 39)
- Place of birth: Mumbai, Maharashtra, India
- Height: 1.81 m (5 ft 11 1/2 in)
- Position: Midfielder

Team information
- Current team: MYJ-GMSC
- Number: 10

Senior career*
| Years | Team | Apps | (Gls) |
| 2006–2014 | Air India | | |
| 2014–2017 | Mumbai | | |
| 2021–2022 | Ambernath United Atlanta | | |
| 2023- | MYJ-GMSC | | |
- * Club domestic league appearances and goals as of 25 June 2020

Allan Dias (born 17 December 1986 in Mumbai, Maharashtra) is an Indian footballer who currently plays for MYJ-GMSC in the I-league 3 as a midfielder.

== Playing career ==
At a very young age, Allan started playing football for Jolly Boys F.C., a local club started by his brother, Lawrence Dias, former Air India FC and Mahindra United F.C. starlet, in Sahar Village, a small place in Mumbai where he and his elder brother grew up. Determined hard work and rigorous training helped Allan achieve at various levels in private tournaments held all over the city.

Allan's hard work paid off and Air India FC was aware of the progress made by the youngster. In 2006, Air India FC signed the youngster to compete at the highest level of Indian football. Since then Allan Dias has shown great progress on the field. The lad put up his name on the scoresheet many times since then.

A number of clubs have been monitoring his situation at Air India, looking for a transfer, one of them rumored to be Mumbai F.C. The Sahar wonderboy took a great leap, from playing for his brothers club to captaining Air India FC. In 2014 he joined Mumbai F.C. and left the club after its dismissal in 2017.

In 2021, Allan Dias joined Ambernath United Atlanta FC. Allan as also been part of Maharashtra Squad and even led the side in the prestigious Santosh Trophy.

== Honors and awards ==
RCF: Led the clubs to triumphs in Nadkarni Cup and various All India tournaments.

Air India: Led the team in I-League, Won Durand Cup, Mumbai Elite Division, Nadkarni Cup and more.

Mumbai FC: Conquered Mumbai Elite Division and Nadkarni Cup

Ambernath United – Atlanta FC: Led the team to I-League 2 and Mumbai League glory twice.

KSA: Led the club to Mumbai League Title
