= Kamaljeet Kumar =

Indian footballer (born 1988)

Personal information
- Full name: Kamaljeet Kumar
- Date of birth: 22 March 1988 (age 38)
- Place of birth: Jammu, India
- Height: 1.79 m (5 ft 10 1/2 in)
- Position: Defender

Team information
- Current team: Mumbai
- Number: 17

Senior career*
Years	Team	Apps	(Gls)
2007–2010	Mumbai	46	(5)
2010–2012	Pune	13	(1)
2012–present	Mumbai	21	(0)
- * Club domestic league appearances and goals as of 27 April 2014

Kamaljeet Kumar (born 22 March 1988) is an Indian football player. He is currently playing for Mumbai in the I-League as a defender.
