= Godfrey Pereira =

Indian footballer

Personal information
- Full name: Godfred Pereira
- Place of birth: India

Team information
- Current team: Air India FC (head coach)

Senior career*
Years	Team	Apps	(Gls)
- Air India

International career
1992	India		

Managerial career
- 2012: Air India
- * Club domestic league appearances and goals

Godfred Godfrey Pereira is a former Indian footballer and current head coach of Air India FC.

== Coaching career ==
=== Air India ===
On 3 July 2012, it was announced that Pereira had become coach of Air India FC after Santosh Kashyap joined Mohun Bagan. Earlier in his playing career, Pereira played for the India national football team. He coached his first match for Air India on 26 August 2012 during the 2012 Durand Cup against Delhi United FC, in which Air India won 3–0. Then on 1 September 2012 Pereira led Air India to their first ever championship in their history after they won 3–2 on penalties against Dodsal F.C. in the final of the Durand Cup.

On 27 December 2012, with Air India in 10th place in the I-League, Pereira officially resigned from his post as the head coach of the club, citing salary issues as the reason for his resigning.

== Career statistics ==
=== Coach ===
Statistics accurate as of 27 December 2012. Include stats for all matches including league and cup. No friendlies.

Team	From	To	Record				
Team	From	To	G	W	D	L	Win %
Air India	3 July 2012	27 December 2012	17	7	3	7	41.18
Total			17	7	3	7	41.18
