= Santosh Kashyap =

Indian footballer and manager

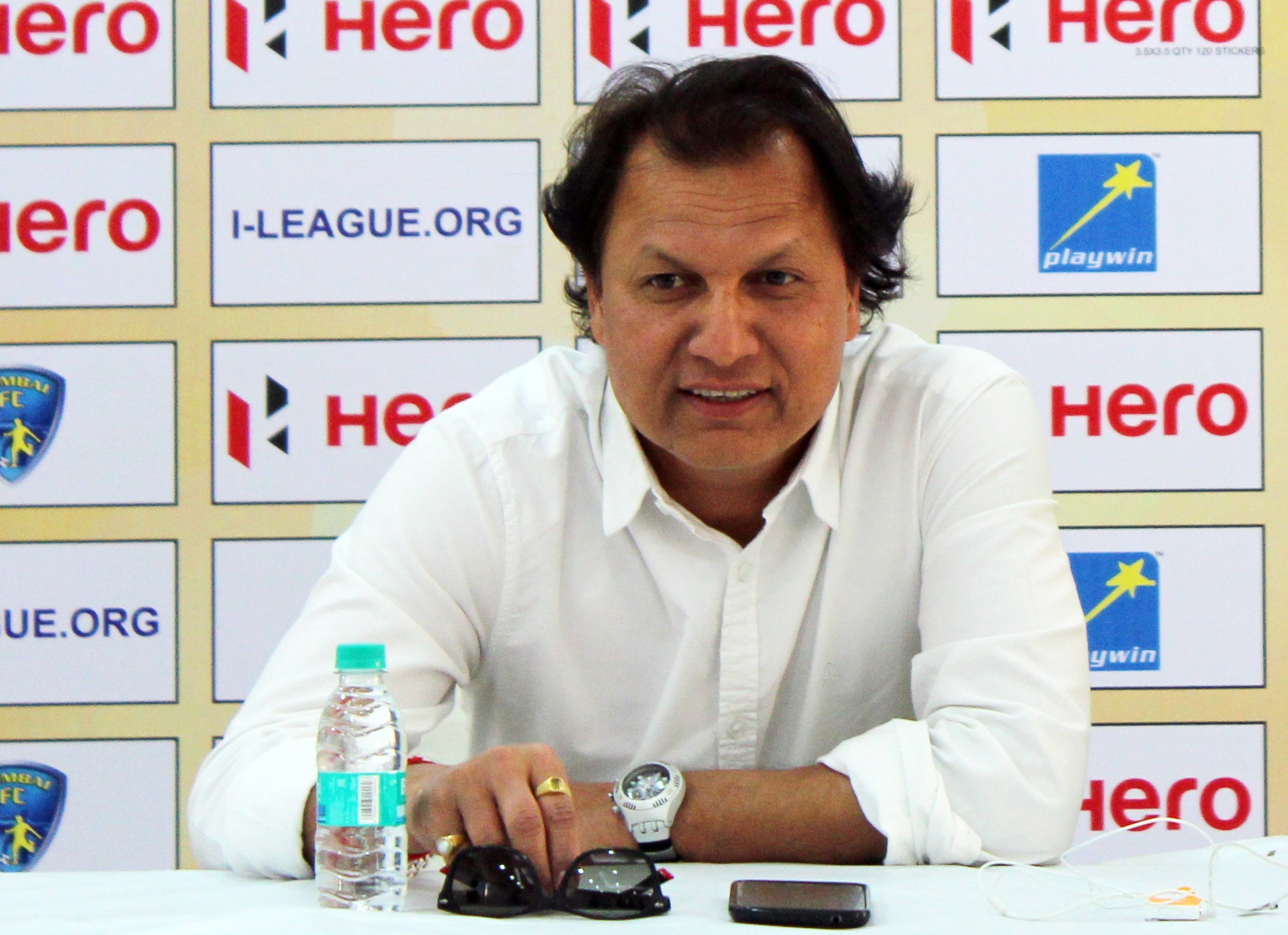
- Kashyap with Mumbai FC in 2015

Personal information
- Date of birth: 12 June 1966 (age 60)
- Place of birth: Delhi, India
- Position: Forward

Team information
- Current team: Maharashtra (head coach)

Senior career*
Years	Team	Apps	(Gls)
1984–1998	Bengal Mumbai	424	(76)
1998-2006	Mahindra United	256	(64)

International career
1990-2004	India	54	(8)

Managerial career
- 2010–2011: Air India
- 2011-2012: Mohun Bagan
- 2012–2013: ONGC
- 2012-2013: Rangdajied United
- 2013–2014: Royal Wahingdoh
- 2014-2015: NorthEast United (assistant)
- 2015-2016: Salgaocar
- 2016–2018: Mumbai
- 2018-2019: Aizawl
- 2019–2023: Chennaiyin FC B
- 2023–2024: Odisha FC (assistant)
- 2024-2025: India (women)
- 2025–: Maharashtra
- * Club domestic league appearances and goals

Santosh Kashyap (born 12 June 1966) is an Indian football head coach and former player who currently serves as the head coach of the Maharashtra state team. He also served as the head coach of the India women's national football team. He also served as the assistant coach of the Indian Super League club Odisha FC. During his professional career, he represented India in international level and Mahindra United in the National Football League. Previously, he has been youth coach at Mahindra United, and Mohun Bagan.

== Coaching career ==
After the end of his playing career, Kashyap went into coaching. His first job was as the Mahindra United U-19 coach. In his final season with the Mahindra Youth Team, he led them to clinch the championship in the highly competitive Super Division of the Mumbai Football League.

=== Air India ===
Before the 2010-11 I-League season Santosh signed for I-League club Air India FC. Despite the low amount of funds that were given to Santosh Kashyap still managed to keep Air India out of the relegation zone.

=== Mohun Bagan ===
Kashyap was appointed Mohun Bagan coach on 26 May 2012. However, he resigned after only two matches in 2012–13 I-League and a poor performance in 2012 Federation Cup.

=== ONGC ===
After resigning from Mohun Bagan, he was appointed by ONGC F.C. for the rest of the season.

=== Rangdajied United ===
Kashyap managed Rangdajied United F.C. for 2013–14 I-League season. However, On 21 February 2014, he was sacked by the team after a disappointing start of the season.

=== Royal Wahingdoh ===
Kashyap was appointed the coach for newly promoted Royal Wahingdoh before the start of the 2014–15 I-League. Under his coaching, Royal Wahingdoh ended the season in third position. However, Royal Wahingdoh pulled out of I-League and Kashyap left the club.

=== NorthEast United ===
In June 2015 Kashyap was appointed as the assistant coach of Indian Super League club NorthEast United FC. At the end of the season he left the club.

=== Salgaocar ===
Kashyap was appointed as Salgaocar head coach in 2015–16 season. Kashyap parted ways with the club on 27 April 2016 at the end of the season.

=== Mumbai ===
On 22 June 2016, Mumbai F.C. announced that Kashyap will take over as head coach for the 2016-17 season.

=== Aizawl ===
Kashyap was appointed as the head coach by the defending champions, Aizawl F.C.

== Personal life ==
His son Sameer Kashyap is also a footballer who plays as a forward, and represented DSK Shivajians at the U16 level and Chennaiyin's reserve team in the I-League 2nd Division.

== Statistics ==
=== Managerial statistics ===
As of 2024

Team	From	To	Record				
Team	From	To	G	W	D	L	Win %
Air India	2010	2012	26	9	5	12	34.62
Mohun Bagan	2012	2012	5	1	1	3	20.00
Rangdajied United	2013	2014	19	2	8	9	10.53
Royal Wahingdoh	2014	2015	24	9	7	8	37.50
Salgaocar	2016	2016	12	4	4	4	33.33
Mumbai	2016	2017	14	2	4	8	14.29
Aizawl	2018	2018	5	2	1	2	40.00
India Women	2024	2024	3	1	1	1	33.33
Total			108	30	31	47	27.78

== Honours ==
=== Player ===
Mahindra United

- Federation Cup runner-up: 1993

India

- South Asian Games Bronze medal: 1989

== See also ==
- List of association football families
