= Air India FC =

Indian multi-sports club

Air India
- Full name: Air India Football Club
- Nickname: The Pilots
- Founded: 1952; 74 years ago
- Ground: Cooperage Ground
- Capacity: 5,000
- Owner: Air India Limited
- Head coach: Godfrey Pereira
- League: MFA Elite Corporate League
- 2022–23: Champions
Home colours	Away colours

Air India Football Club is a football section of the same-named Indian institutional multi-sports club. Founded by Anand Prajapati in 1952, the club is based in Mumbai, Maharashtra. Sponsored by Air India, the club previously played in the Mumbai Football League, and now in the MFA Elite Corporate League.

The club previously competed in the I-League, then top tier of Indian football league system. As multiple champions in various Mumbai competitions, Air India is best known for nurturing youngsters into big time players. Many of these boys have played with distinction for bigger teams in the later years.

In 2005, the team qualified to the National Football League first division, and then 2007 saw Air India finishing 7th and were the Mumbai Harwood Champions in 2005. Considered as one of the "giant killers" in Indian leagues, Air India also appeared in corporate tournaments such as the All India Public Sector League, and ONGC Trophy.

== History ==
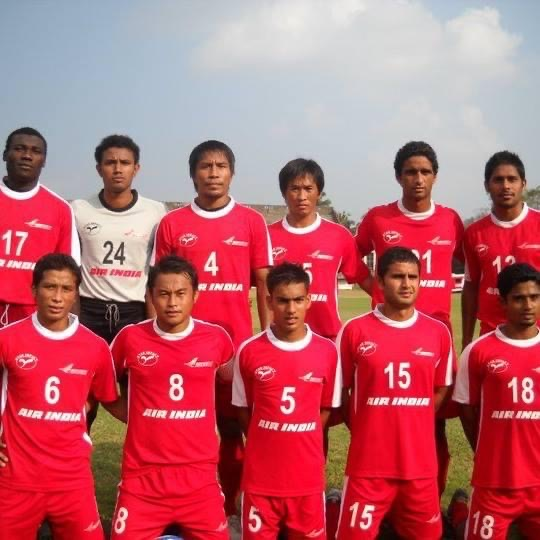
Air India team line-up in 2010

=== Formation and journey ===
Founded in 1952 in Bombay, Air India Football Club is one of the oldest institutional sides in the country. Since then, they became affiliated with Western India Football Association (WIFA). Though never considered as frontrunners in the I-League, the Mumbai-based club has often proved to be a thorn in the flesh for many top sides.

==== In leagues of Mumbai ====
Since their inception, Air India became a member of WIFA and later in 1983, became affiliated with Mumbai District Football Association (formerly BDFA). Nicknamed "the pilots", Air India participated in later editions of Bombay Harwood League alongside Maharashtra Football League.

They participated in B.D.F.A League, and W.I.F.A. Super Division from 1990 to 1999 and clinched WIFA title in 1999.

Air India also participated in MDFA Elite Division, and lifted trophies in 2009–10, 2013–14, 2014–15 and 2016–17 season. They also won Harwood league in 2000 and 2005.

=== National Football League seasons ===
They used to play in the NFL 2nd Division but got promoted to Premier Division and have maintained their position there until the formation of I-League. Generally a low budget side, Air India's best finish in the National Football League came in the 1997–1998 season, when they were placed sixth in the table and their coach Bimal Ghosh received the Best coach award.

Air India had been playing in the Premier Harwood League since 1980. Though it, they qualified for the National Football League in 1995. In the first season of NFL 1996, they finished 6th on the table and then 5th in 1997. After being relegated to the second division in 1998, Air India paved their way back into the first division the next year and played in the National Football League in 2000 as well. The years 2001 to 2004 saw Air India going through a tough phase as they were playing in the second division. In 2005 the team qualified to the National Football League first division and then 2007 saw Air India finishing 7th and were the Mumbai Harwood Champions in 2005. In 1996, they emerged as the champions of Sikkim Governor's Gold Cup and they lifted the trophy again in 2006. The club also hosted an inter-club tournament named "Air-India Millenium Cup" at the Air-India Colony Grounds, in Kalina, Mumbai, from 2000 to 2005 – in which they clinched title on four occasions.

=== Present years ===
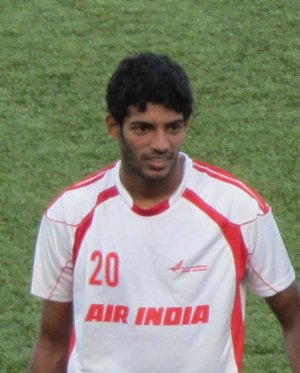
Allan Dias with Air India at the 2010–11 I-League

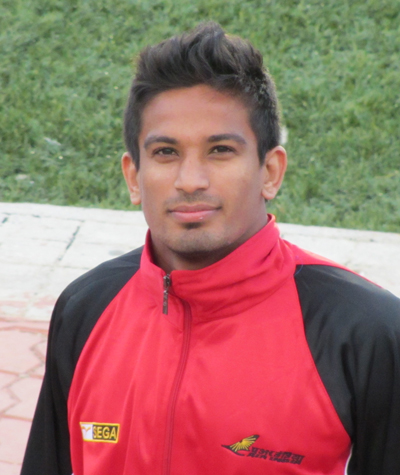
Manandeep Singh with Air India in 2011

Air India became part of the I-League since the inaugural edition. In 2008, they created history by winning the E. K. Nayanar Gold Cup, defeating three visiting foreign teams, Associação Ferroviária de Esportes of Brazil, Bayelsa FC of Nigeria and Buenos Aires De Futbal of Argentina. Interestingly Bayelsa won Nigerian Professional Football League and reached semi-finals of African Confederations Cup once. Other than Mohun Bagan A.C. (1911 IFA Shield) and East Bengal FC (ASEAN Club Championship), no other Indian club has defeated so many foreign teams to win a single tournament.

In 2012 Durand Cup, the club emerged as the champions, which was their last trophy. On 25 February 2012, it was announced that parent company Air India do not have any plans on fulfilling the AFC Criteria required to play in the league and thus may fold the club by the end of the 2011–12 I-League season. Anthony Fernandes was appointed as interim head coach on 30 December 2012 after Godfrey Pereira was revealed to be away from the team due to salary issues. On 2 January 2013, it was confirmed that Pereira had left his post, when Air India played against Salgaocar at Duler Stadium in I-League in which, and lost the match 4–0. They came back to I-League, participating in the 2012–13 I-League season. On 7 April 2013, they played against Mumbai F.C. and lost 3–1. They earned 26 points in 19 league matches and finished on thirteenth position.

The club later confirmed their inability to field team for the 2013–14 I-League, and financial reasons were main factors behind it.

== Crest & colours ==
Air India has sometimes used a crest different from the logo of the parent company. For the 2011–12 season, however, they used the parent logo on both the home and away jersey.

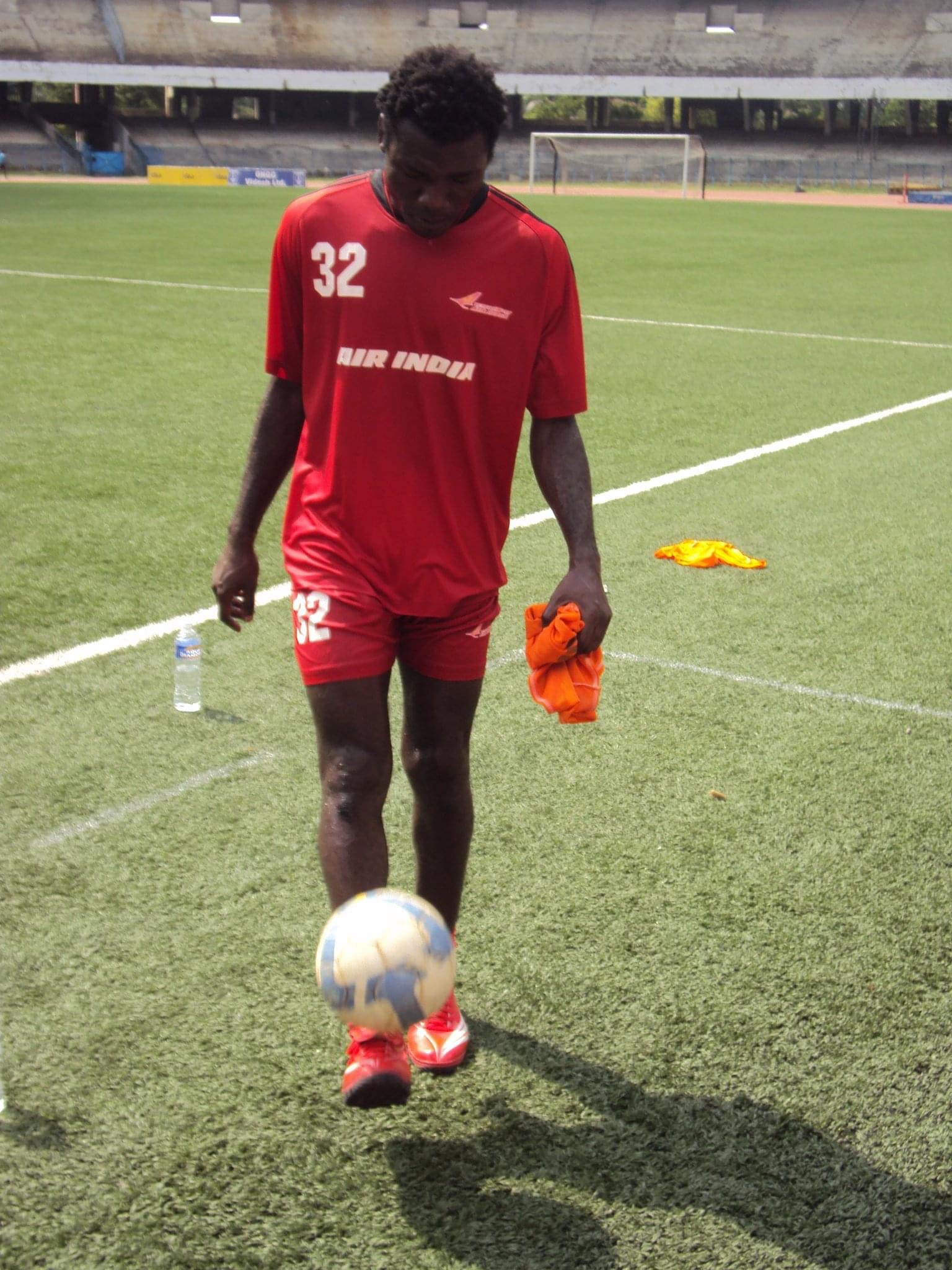
Nigerian midfielder Yusuf Ibrahim in Air India's red outfit

To keep up the image, they decided to make the main colour of the club red, as associated with the company.

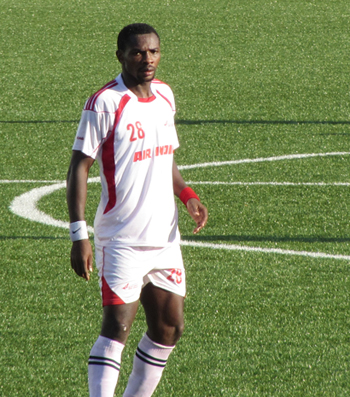
Nigerian striker Henry Ezeh in Air India's white outfit

== Stadium ==
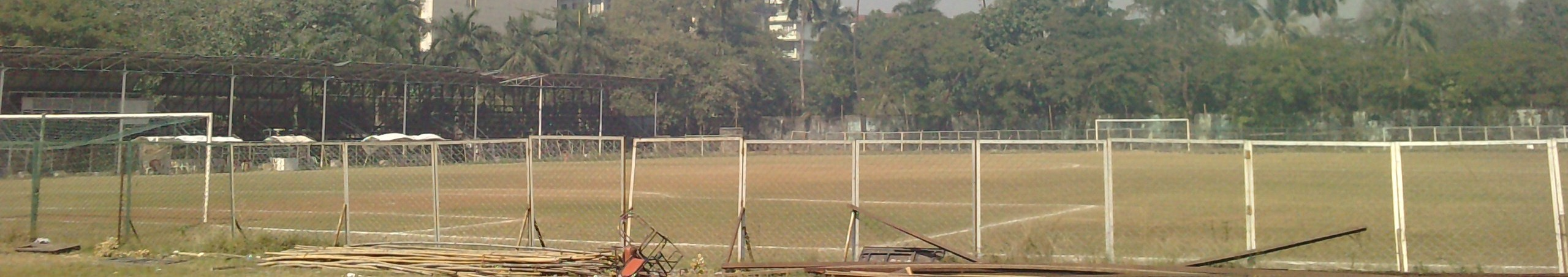
Cooperage Ground before renovation

Air India has been mostly playing at the Cooperage Ground in Mumbai. Between 2007 and 2013, the club hosted home games of the I-League at the ground. While renovations took place, Air India played at the Balewadi Sports Complex in Pune.

During the 2010–11 I-League season, Rajarshi Shahu Stadium in Kolhapur hosted numerous matches of Mumbai teams due to unavailability of Cooperage Ground. Air India played its home games at this ground throughout the season.

== Rivalry ==
Air India had a rivalry with their fellow Mumbai-based club Mahindra United, with whom they played in local derby matches in both the NFL and MDFA Elite League.

== Ownership ==
As a corporate sporting entity since its inception, Air India Football Club has been owned and run by airline company Air India which currently own a hub at Mumbai's Chhatrapati Shivaji International Airport which is where the club is located.

== Kit manufacturers and shirt sponsors ==
Period	Kit manufacturer	Shirt sponsor
2000–2011	–	Air India
2011–2013	Star Impact	Air India

== Managerial history ==
=== Head coach's record ===
Picture	Name	Nationality	From	To	P	W	D	L	GF	GA	Win%	Honours
	Bimal Ghosh	India	2008	2009	22	5	9	8	21	26	22.73	
	Yusif Ansari	India	2009	June 2010	26	7	7	12	28	46	26.92	
	Santosh Kashyap	India	August 2010	26 May 2012	52	14	14	24	54	94	26.92	
	Godfrey Pereira	India	3 July 2012	27 December 2012	17	7	3	7	25	27	41.18	2012 Durand Cup
	Anthony Fernandes	India	30 December 2012	2 March 2013	7	1	4	2	8	14	14.29	
	Naushad Moosa	India	2 March 2013	2013	0	0	0	0	0	0	—	

== Notable players ==
- The players below, had senior/youth international cap(s) for their respective countries. Players whose name is listed represented their countries before or after playing for Air India FC.
- (India) Khalid Jamil (1998–2001)
- (India) Steven Dias (2001–2003)
- (Spain) Gorka Guarrotxena Menárguez (2003–2005)
- (India) Nirmal Chettri (2006–2008)
- (Afghanistan) Mujtaba Faiz (2012–2013)
- (India) Rahul Bheke (2011–2013)
- (India) Raynier Fernandes (2014–2016)

== Honours ==
=== Domestic tournaments ===
- National Football League 2nd Division
  - Champions (1): 1999–00
  - Runners-up (1): 2004–05
  - Third place (1): 2001–02
- Durand Cup
  - Champions (1): 2012
- Sikkim Governor's Gold Cup
  - Champions (2): 1996, 2006
  - Runners-up (2): 2000, 2003
- Mumbai Harwood League/MDFA Elite Division
  - Champions (9): 1992, 1994, 1996, 1997–98, 1999, 2009–10, 2013–14, 2014–15, 2016–17
  - Runners-up (3): 1988, 2000, 2005
  - Third place (1): 2019–20
- MFA Elite Corporate League
  - Champions (1): 2023
  - Runners-up (1): 2022
- WIFA Super Division
  - Champions (1): 1999
- E. K. Nayanar Memorial Gold Cup
  - Champions (1): 2008
  - Runners-up (1): 2012
- IFA Shield (Note: Fourth oldest football tournament, organized by the IFA (W.B.), and played between the local clubs of West Bengal and other invited ones.)
  - Runners-up (1): 2009
- Rovers Cup
  - Runners-up (2): 1994, 1996
- Nadkarni Cup
  - Champions (8): 1984, 1991, 2005, 2006, 2009, 2017, 2018, 2019
  - Runners-up (6): 1983, 1988, 2001, 2010, 2014, 2015
- Air-India Millenium Cup
  - Champions (4): 2001, 2002, 2003, 2004
- Aurungabad Mayor's Trophy
  - Champions (1): 2006
- Kalina MLA Cup
  - Champions (1): 2013
- Arlem Cup
  - Runners-up (1): 2002
- Kalinga Cup
  - Runners-up (1): 2013
- G.V. Raja Football Tournament
  - Runners-up (1): 2015
- All India Super Sports Society Football Cup
  - Runners-up (1): 2016

== Team records ==
=== Individual records ===
- Youngest ever hat-trick scorer in Indian highest division league: Bungo Singh – 18 years and 3 days; for Air India vs. SBT (5 March 2001)

=== Notable wins against foreign teams ===
As of matches played 30 April 2008

Competition	Round	Year	Opposition	Score	Venue	City	Ref
DCM Trophy	Group stage	1993	Royal Nepal Airlines Club	2–0	Ambedkar Stadium	New Delhi	
DCM Trophy	Group stage	1994	(Nepal) S.D.A. Kathmandu	2–0	Ambedkar Stadium	New Delhi	
DCM Trophy	Group stage	1996	(Nepal) ANFA XI	1–0	Ambedkar Stadium	New Delhi	
Sikkim Governor's Gold Cup	Group stage	2006	Nepal XI	1–0	Paljor Stadium	Gangtok	
E. K. Nayanar Memorial Gold Cup	Group stage	2008	(Argentina) Buenos Aires	5–1	Kannur Municipal Corporation Stadium	Kannur	
E. K. Nayanar Memorial Gold Cup	Final	2008	(Brazil) Associação Ferroviária de Esportes	1–0	Kannur Municipal Corporation Stadium	Kannur	

== Other departments ==
=== Field hockey ===
The club has its hockey team, that competed in Beighton Cup (one of the oldest field hockey tournaments in the world), and lifted the trophy in 2007 and 2010. They also appeared in Bombay Gold Cup.

Notable players

- Ashok Kumar – member of the India national hockey team that won 1975 World Cup, recipient of Arjuna Award in 1974, played for Air India (then known as Indian Airlines).
- Adrian D'Souza – field hockey goalkeeper who represented India at the Sultan Azlan Shah Hockey Tournament, earned more than 100 international caps, and played for Air India.
- Mervyn Fernandis – won gold medal at the 1980 Summer Olympics at Moscow, representing India.
- Baljit Singh Dhillon – represented India at the numerous editions of the Summer Olympics.
- Sameer Dad – represented India at the 1998 Asian Games and 1998 Men's Hockey World Cup, also played for Air India.
- Subbaiah Anjaparavanda – represented India at the men's tournament of 1996 Summer Olympics, and played for Air India (Indian Airlines).
- Shakeel Ahmed – represented India at the 1992 Summer Olympics, also played for Air India.
- Yuvraj Walmiki – was a member of the Indian team that won the 2011 Asian Champions Trophy, played in domestic tournaments with Air India.
- Len Aiyappa Ballachanda – represented India at the Sultan Azlan Shah Cup and World Series Hockey, also played for Air India.

Honours

- Senior National Hockey Championship
  - Champions (2): 2013, 2014
  - Runners-up (2): 2012, 2020
  - Third place (1): 2015
- Beighton Cup
  - Champions (2): 2007, 2010
  - Runners-up (1): 1995
- Bombay Gold Cup
  - Champions (2): 2001, 2002
  - Runners-up (3): 2007, 2009, 2013
- Guru Tegh Bahadur Gold Cup
  - Champions (3): 2008, 2010, 2015
- Surjit Memorial Hockey Tournament
  - Champions (1): 2011
  - Runners-up (4): 1992, 1994, 1995, 2010
- Senior Nehru Hockey Tournament
  - Champions (4): 1995, 1997, 2001, 2010
  - Runners-up (1): 1994

=== Academy and youth football ===
The club operates youth academy teams (colts), and their under-19 team previously competed in I-League U19.

=== Men's cricket ===
The men's cricket team of Air India competes in regional tournaments including Maharaja Padam Singh Championship and Hot Weather Championship, which are organized by the Delhi & District Cricket Association.

Honours

- DDCA Hot Weather Championship
  - Runners-up (1): 2013

== See also ==
- List of Air India FC managers
- List of Air India FC seasons
- List of football clubs in Mumbai
- Sports in Maharashtra
