= Mumbai FC =

Indian professional football club

Mumbai
- Full name: Mumbai Football Club
- Nicknames: Mumbaikars, Yellow Brigade
- Short name: MFC
- Founded: 27 June 2007; 19 years ago
- Dissolved: 2017; 9 years ago
- Ground: Cooperage Ground, Mumbai, Maharashtra
- Capacity: 5,000
- Owner: Essel Group
- Chairman: Amit Goenka
- League: Mumbai Football League
Home colours	Away colours

Mumbai Football Club was an Indian professional football club based in Mumbai, Maharashtra. The club predominantly competed in I-League, then top flight of Indian football league system. Mumbai also participated in MDFA Elite League, now known as Mumbai Premier League. The club was founded in 2007, with the objective of providing a platform for the young aspiring footballers from the city to showcase their talent and to try to make it to the big stage. They were nicknamed both "Mumbaikars," and "Yellow Brigade."

The club gained promotion to the I-League after winning the 2008 I-League 2nd Division, and finished 7th in their maiden I-League campaign in 2008–09 season. Mumbai FC has a local rivalry with another Mumbai-based club Air India and state rivalry with Pune dubbed as the 'Maha' derby as both clubs play in the state of Maharashtra. The club became defunct by 2019.

== History ==
=== Beginning ===
Mumbai FC was officially founded at a grand launch in Mumbai on 27 June 2007. The club was created to provide Indian football another non-institutional club and to provide young aspiring footballers in the city a chance to show off their skills on a proper platform. Mumbai FC then set about their goals in which they wanted to build a strong first team, build a good youth development program which would serve as the platform in the ladder to the first-team for potential youngsters, build a good football culture in Mumbai, and develop the football infrastructure in Mumbai. The club started building their team straight away with the signing of Englishmen David Booth. The team then started making some major signings in Indian internationals, and were carried in various tournaments by Pepsi Itmaizah Abhishek Yadav, Khalid Jamil, Noel Wilson, and Kalyan Chaubey along with potential youngsters Dane Pereira and Darren Caldeira.

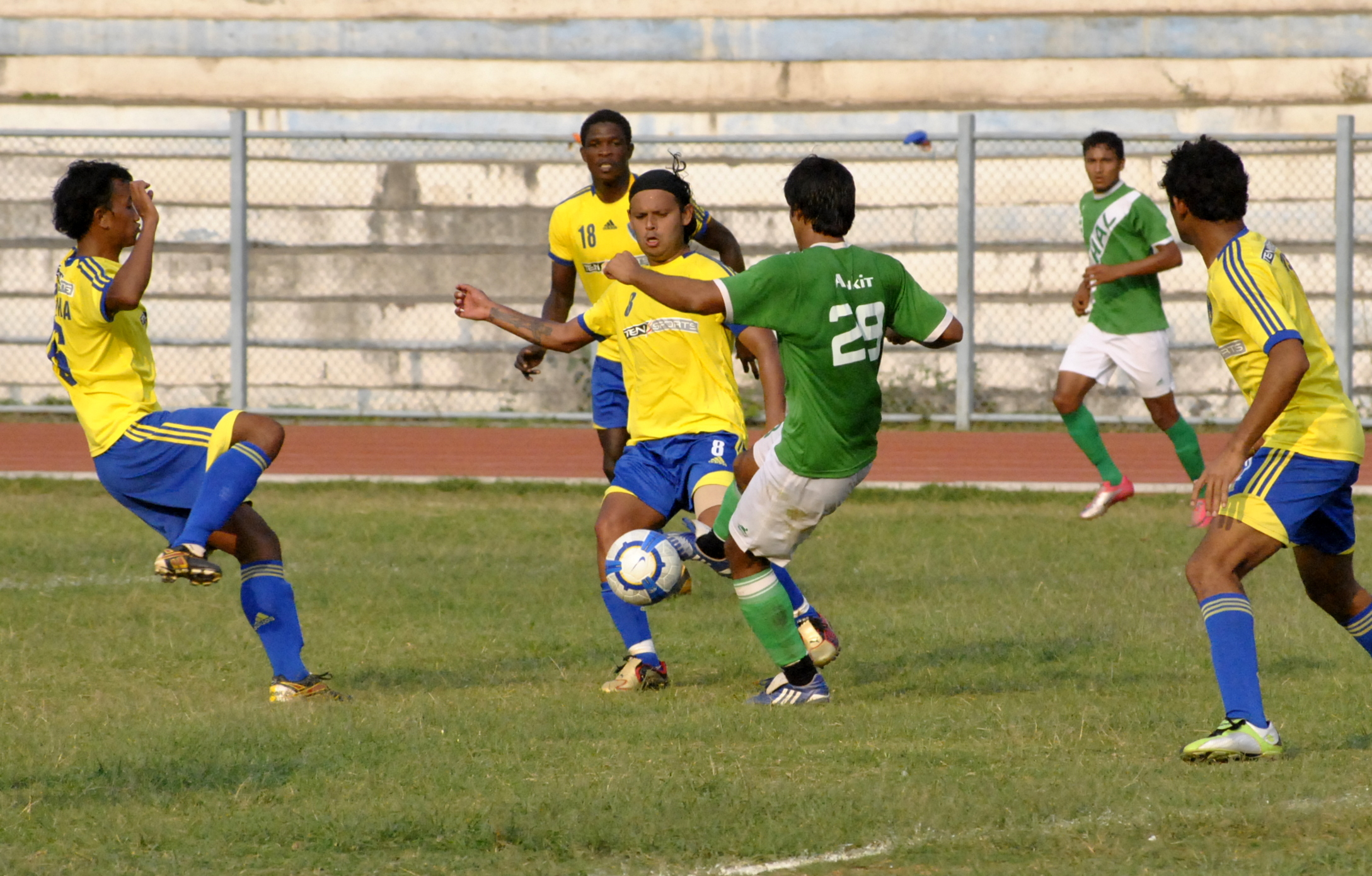
Noel Wilson in action with Mumbai FC against HAL SC in an I-League encounter

The team then added their first round of foreign players Felix Aboagye and James Dissiramah. The club then began their grassroots project in November 2007 with Aqueel Ansari being the head coach. Mumbai FC then participated in their first tournament, the Mumbai Football League Elite Division in 2007. Mumbai FC lost their match in the Mumbai Football League to RCF 2–1 with Dane Pereira scoring the first goal. Mumbai FC then won the first match in their history against Bengal Mumbai; in their second match, won 7–0 with Abhishek Yadav scoring four goals. The club then won their first-ever championship, the Abhijit Kadam Memorial Cup, in which Mumbai defeated then I-League club Vasco. The club then finished in second place in the Mumbai Football League Elite Division behind I-League club Mahindra United.

=== I-League 2nd Division ===
The club played in their first national competition in 2008 when they participated in the 2008 I-League 2nd Division. The club was placed in Group B with Mohammedan, Indian Bank, Amity United, Oil India, and New Delhi Heroes. The club won their first four matches in their group, only losing the final match of the group stage against Mohammedan which did not matter as the club was already qualified for the Final Round. The club won their first match of the Final Round which was a revenge match against Mohammedan. The club then played local rivals Pune for the first time in their history and thus started the Maha Derby (however the match was on neutral territory) with Mumbai winning the match. The club then drew against Vasco which was followed by a two-goal victory over Indian Bank. The club then officially secured promotion to the I-League when they defeated Chirag United despite being a man-down.

=== 2008–2009: I-League ===
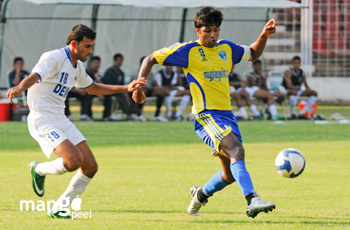
Abhishek Yadav of Mumbai FC and Samir Naik of Dempo SC during a 2008–09 I-League match at the Fatorda Stadium in Goa

The club played their first season in the I-League during the 2008–09 I-League season. The club played their first I-League match against historic club Mohun Bagan on 27 September 2008 in which Abel Hammond scored the first I-League goal for Mumbai FC as Mumbai went on to win 2–1 at the Barasat Stadium. Mumbai then completed a double against the two giant Kolkata clubs after they defeated East Bengal at the Salt Lake Stadium 1–0 with Felix Aboagye scoring the only goal. Mumbai then played their first home match in their history at the Cooperage Ground on 11 October 2008 with Kalia Kulothungan scoring the only goal in the match. Halfway through the season Mumbai was placed in sixth place in the table. The club however did finish in 7th place which currently remains their best position to date.

=== Khalid Jamil era (2009–2016) ===
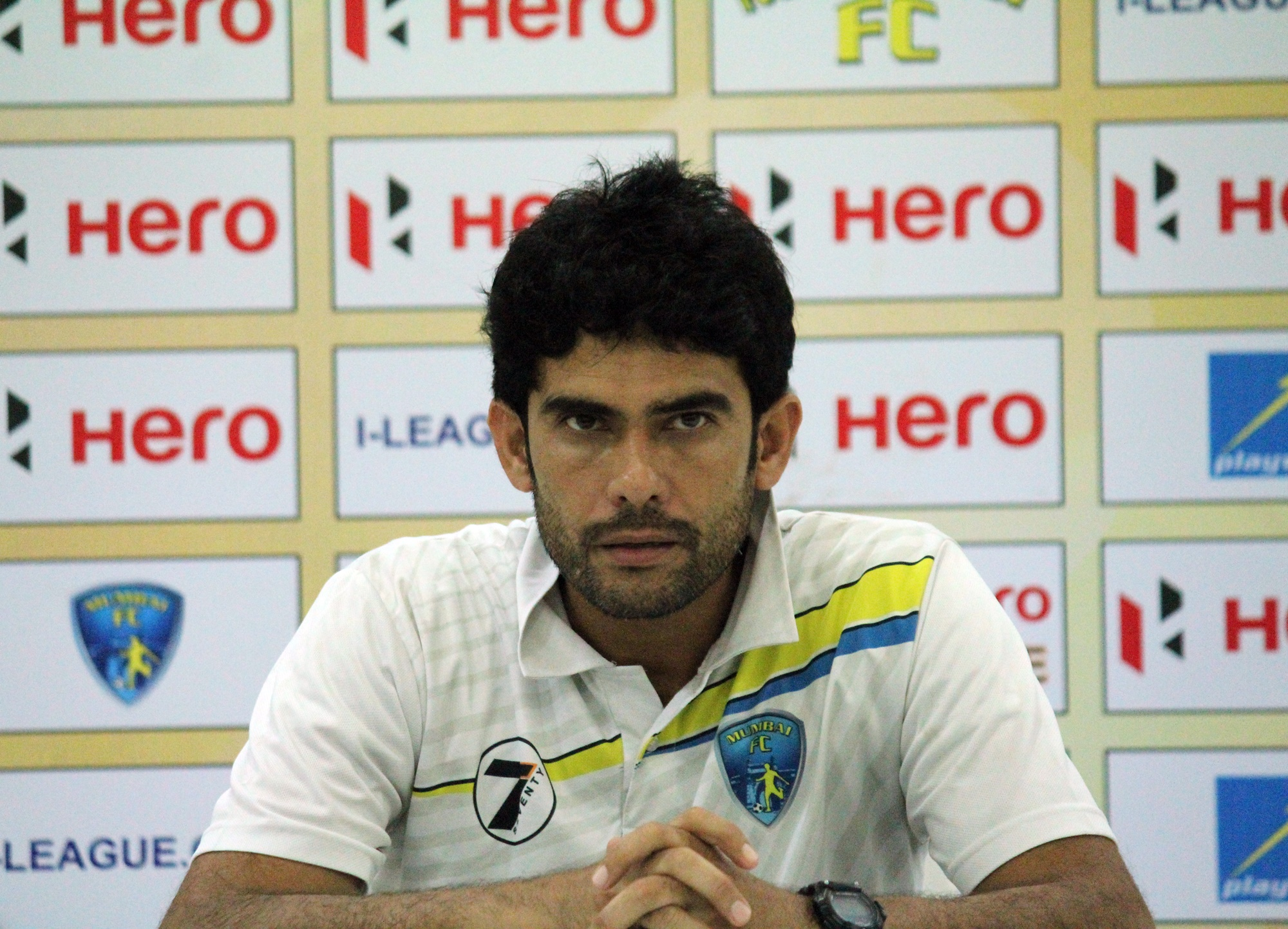
Khalid Jamil was Mumbai FC's first Indian manager as well as longest serving coach

Khalid is the longest running manager in the I-league. He has managed Mumbai from 2009 to 2016 for long seven years.

Mumbai FC acquired foreigners in Josimar, Chika Wali and Taisuke Matsugae. The squad consisted of a strong base of Mumbai-based players like Dane Pereira, Ashutosh Mehta, Jayesh Rane, John Coutinho, Rahul Bheke, Collin Abranches, Abhishek Yadav, Rohit Mirza, Cletus Paul, Allan Dias and Paresh Shivalkar. The team captain is Climax Lawrence and vice-captain is Nidhin Lal.

Mumbai failed to make an impact in the Federation Cup as they got knocked out in the Group stage itself by finishing at the bottom. The club was pit in Group A alongside Dempo SC, East Bengal, Sporting Clube de Goa and Royal Wahingdoh. All group stage games were played at Fatorda Stadium, Goa. The team lost their first game 2–1 against newbies Royal Wahingdoh with Josimar scoring the consolation goal in the game. A solitary Samapth Kutty Mani goal in the 1–0 win against Sporting Goa gave Mumbai a glimmer of hope to qualify for the semi-finals. In the next game against East Bengal unfortunately ended in a 0–0 draw as Mumbai's inability to finish their chances cost them a win. The last game against Dempo ended in a 2–0 defeat for Mumbai which knocked Mumbai out of the Federation Cup.

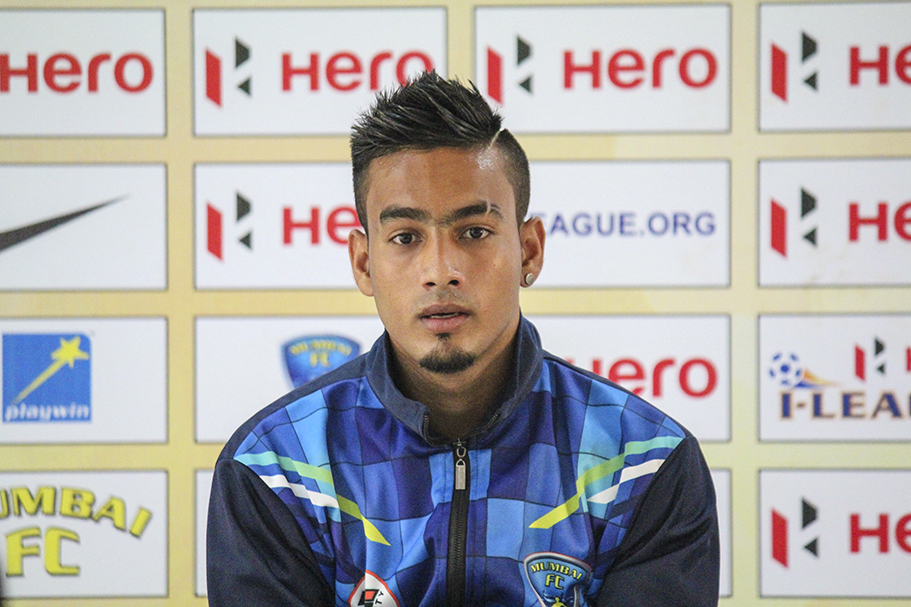
Mumbai FC player Collin Abranches in press meet in 2015

The dismal form continued in the 2014–15 I-League as Mumbai lost their first three matches in a row. The losses included a 3–1 loss at Kolkata against Mohun Bagan, a 1–0 loss against Shillong Lajong and a 3–2 defeat in the Maha Derby against Pune FC. The next match against Sporting Goa was a big game for the club as it was Mumbai's homecoming. The club would play their first game at their home ground – Cooperage Football Stadium after a five-year hiatus. The match ended in a 0–0 draw thereby handing Mumbai their first point in the league. The first match at the Cooperage saw a 2,500 strong crowd.

Mumbai took advantage of getting back at the Cooperage and went on to win two straight home games by thrashing Goan giants Salgaocar 3–0 and then on 20 February 2015 defeating the then league leaders Royal Wahingdoh 2–1. Mumbai FC went on to win their first away game when they beat I-League newcomers Bharat 2–0 which made it three wins in a row and took them to 4th place in the I-League table. They also defeated Churchill Brothers SC 4–2 as Ghanaian player Yusif Yakubu scored a hat-trick. The next match against Bengaluru at the Cooperage ended in a 1–1 draw as an equalizer in the second-half from the in-form Mumbai striker Josimar rescued a point for the Mumbaikars. Khalid Jamil ensured Mumbai survived relegation that season as they finished 6th in the I-League with 24 points in 20 league matches.

The 2015–16 I-League season saw a flurry of changes for them. Khalid Jamil refreshed the squad and his Yellow army briefly fought for the top places before losing track and ultimately finishing at 5th place, which is still Mumbai's highest ever finish in the I-League.

=== 2016–2017 ===
Khalid Jamil was sacked on 15 June 2016, making him the longest running manager in I-League. In July 2016, Mumbai roped in former Royal Wahingdoh and Salgaocar FC manager Santosh Kashyap as their head soach. After making huge changes in both style of play and squad, Mumbai won their initial 2 games aiming for a 'top 3'. But after 12 winless games which included 6 games winless streak and a 5–0 to DSK Shivajians he was sacked. This made his reign the shortest in Mumbai's history.

In March 2017, Mumbai FC roped in Spaniard Óscar Bruzón as their new head coach, and signed Trinidadian and Tobago international Densill Theobald as marquee player, who represented his nation at the 2006 FIFA World Cup.

== Defunction ==
Facing financial problems since 2010, Mumbai FC was relegated from the I-League in 2017, and consequently decided to shut down rather than playing the second division. USports CEO Supratik Sen confirmed their interest in playing the I-League from Mumbai after the success of Mumbai FC for a decade.

"We feel that football in Mumbai has tremendous potential and it's imperative that we have a team in the I-League. Just when fans started coming to the stadium in large numbers for the I-League games, Mumbai FC got relegated and the city didn't have a team in the league anymore", Sen said. Later in 2019, the club was made defunct.

== Crest & colours ==
The Club crest consists of a shield with a yellow figurine of a footballer in front of the Gateway of India.

The colours of Mumbai FC are yellow and blue, which are derived from the club crest. The home kit consists of a yellow jersey with yellow shorts and blue socks while the away kit consists of an orange jersey and white shorts and black socks; the reason why they were nicknamed "yellow submarines".

== Home stadium ==
Since being promoted to the I-League in 2008, Mumbai FC has used the Cooperage Ground as its home ground, which has a seating capacity of 5,000 spectators. They also used the stadium for MDFA Elite Division (now known as Mumbai Mumbai Premier League) matches.

From 2011–12 onwards till 2013–14, the club along with local rivals Air India played their home fixtures at the Balewadi Sports Complex in Pune. The club returned to its original and newly renovated Cooperage Stadium in Mumbai from the 2014–15 season.

During the 2010–11 I-League season, Rajarshi Shahu Stadium in Kolhapur, hosted numerous matches of Mumbai teams due to unavailability of Cooperage Ground. Mumbai FC played its home games at this ground throughout the season.

== Rivalry ==
Mumbai FC used to have a rivalry with fellow Maharashtra-based club Pune FC, with whom it contested the "Maha derby". Both the teams faced each other in yearly competitions like I-League and MDFA Elite League (now known as Mumbai Premier League).

== Kit manufacturers and shirt sponsors ==
Period	Kit manufacturer	Shirt sponsor
2007–2009	Adidas	Playwin
2009–2010	Adidas	Dish TV
2010–2011	Adidas	none
2011–2012	Adidas	TEN HD
2012–2014	7070 Sports	TEN HD
2014–2015	7070 Sports	Playwin
2015–2017	Nivia	Playwin

== Honours ==
=== Senior ===
League

- I-League 2nd Division
  - Champions (1): 2008
- Mumbai Football League
  - Champions (1): 2010–11

Cup

- Nadkarni Cup
  - Champions (4): 2010, 2011, 2015, 2016
- Abhijit Kadam Memorial Cup
  - Champions (1): 2008
- Kolhapur All-India Football Championship
  - Champions (1): 2009

=== Youth ===
- I-League U20
  - Runners-up (1): 2012

== Notable players ==
- The foreign players below had senior/youth international cap(s) for their respective countries. Players whose name is listed, represented their countries before or after playing for Mumbai FC.

World Cup player

- (Trinidad and Tobago) Densil Theobald (2017)

Foreign internationals

- (Ghana) Felix Aboagye (2007–2009)
- (New Zealand) Kayne Vincent (2009–2010)
- (Afghanistan) Zohib Islam Amiri (2011–2014)
- (Nigeria) Orok Essien (2013–2014)
- (Afghanistan) Sandjar Ahmadi (2013–2014)
- (Afghanistan) Ahmad Hatifi (2013–2014)
- (Afghanistan) Hashmatullah Barakzai (2013–2014)
- (North Korea) Son Min-chol (2015–2016)
- (Afghanistan) Djelaludin Sharityar (2017)

== Fans ==
A recognised fan club by the name "Yellow Brigade" had been in support for the Mumbaikars from 2015 until the withdrawal of senior team in 2017. The Cooperage Ground has seen an average attendance of 3500 spectators.

== Managerial history ==
As of January 2017

Picture	Name	Nationality	From	To	P	W	D	L	GF	GA	Win%	Honours	Ref.
	David Booth	England	2007	August 2009	27	11	7	9	24	21	40.74	1 (I-League 2nd Division)	
	Khalid Jamil	India	August 2009	June 2016	78	22	21	35	79	106	28.21		
	Santosh Kashyap	India	22 June 2016	17 March 2017	14	2	4	8	8	23	14.29		
	Oscar Bruzon	Spain	20 March 2017	May 2017	4	0	3	1	1	5	0.00		

== Youth section ==
The club operated its U19 youth men's section (known as Mumbai FC Colts), that participated in Hero U19 I-League. In 2011 season, they reached championship round and achieved third place. During the 2012 I-League U20, Mumbai's Jayesh Rane ended as top scorer of the league with thirteen goals.

Both the U15 and U13 teams of Mumbai FC participated in DSK Cup in Pune, organized by DSK Shivajians. In youth football leagues, the club also shared rivalry with Pune FC.

== Gallery ==
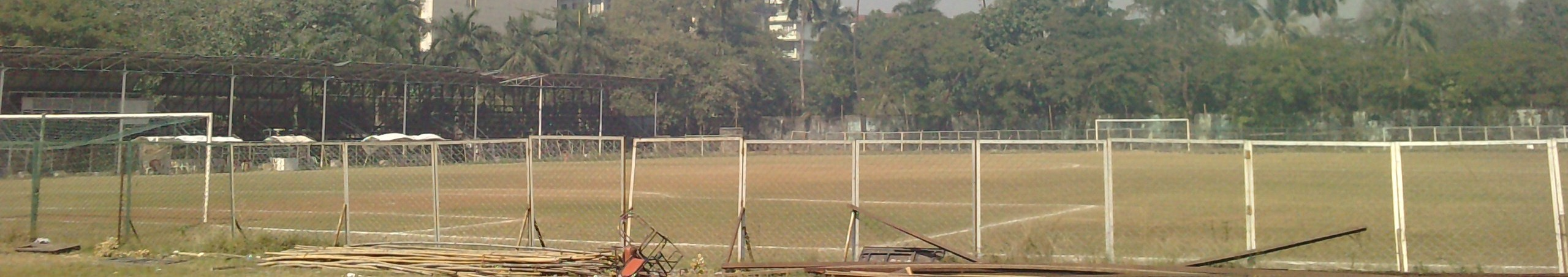
Cooperage Football Ground before renovation

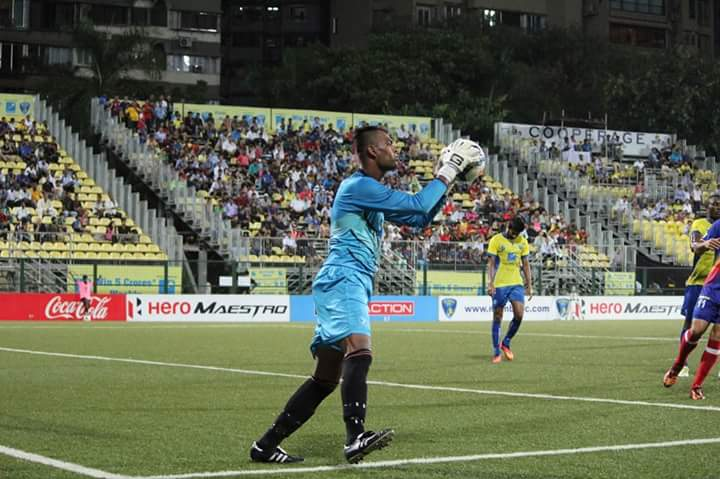
Mumbai FC players during an I-League match against East Bengal at the Cooperage Football Ground in 2015.

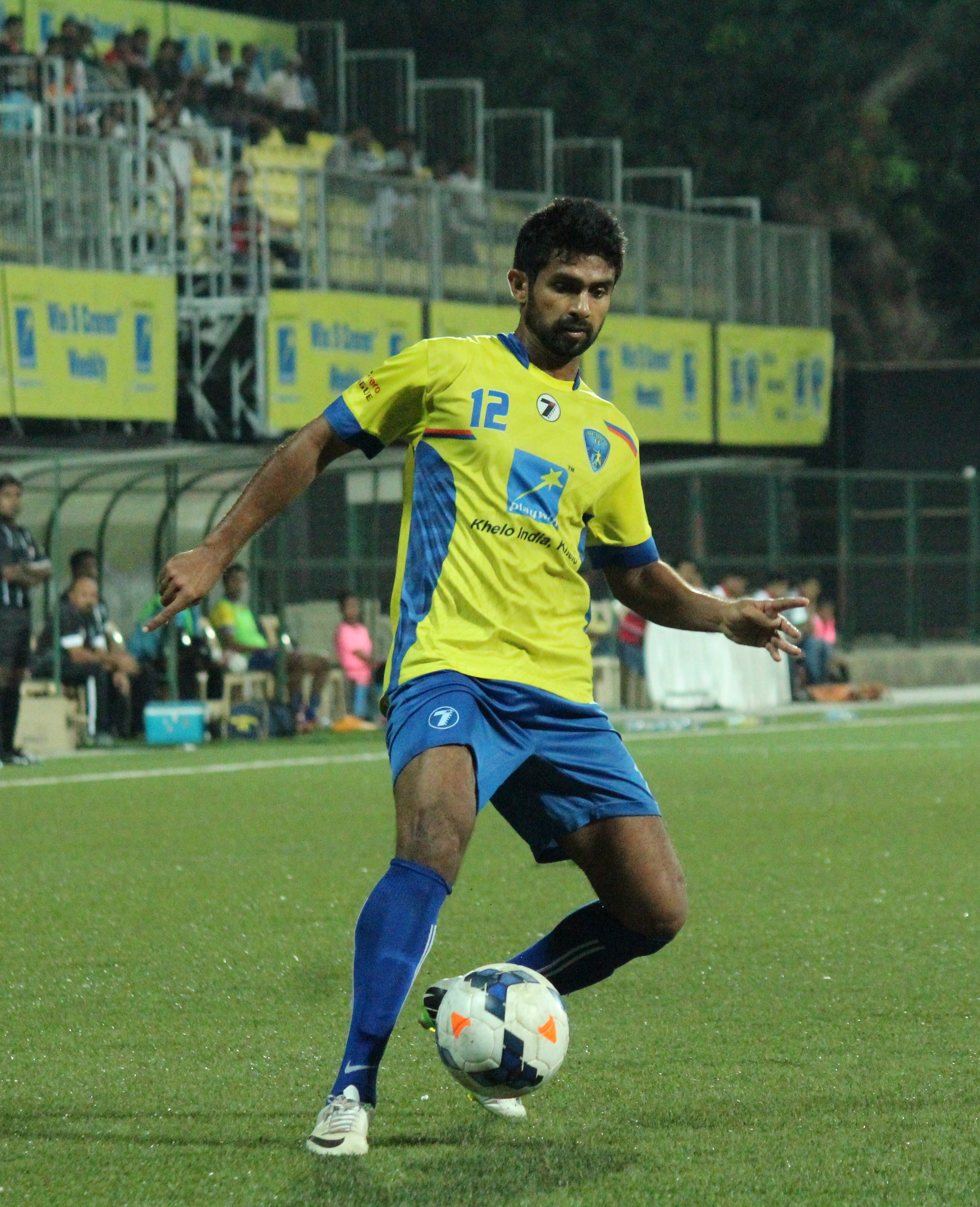
Mohammed Rafi in action with Mumbai FC during an I-League match at the Cooperage Ground in 2015

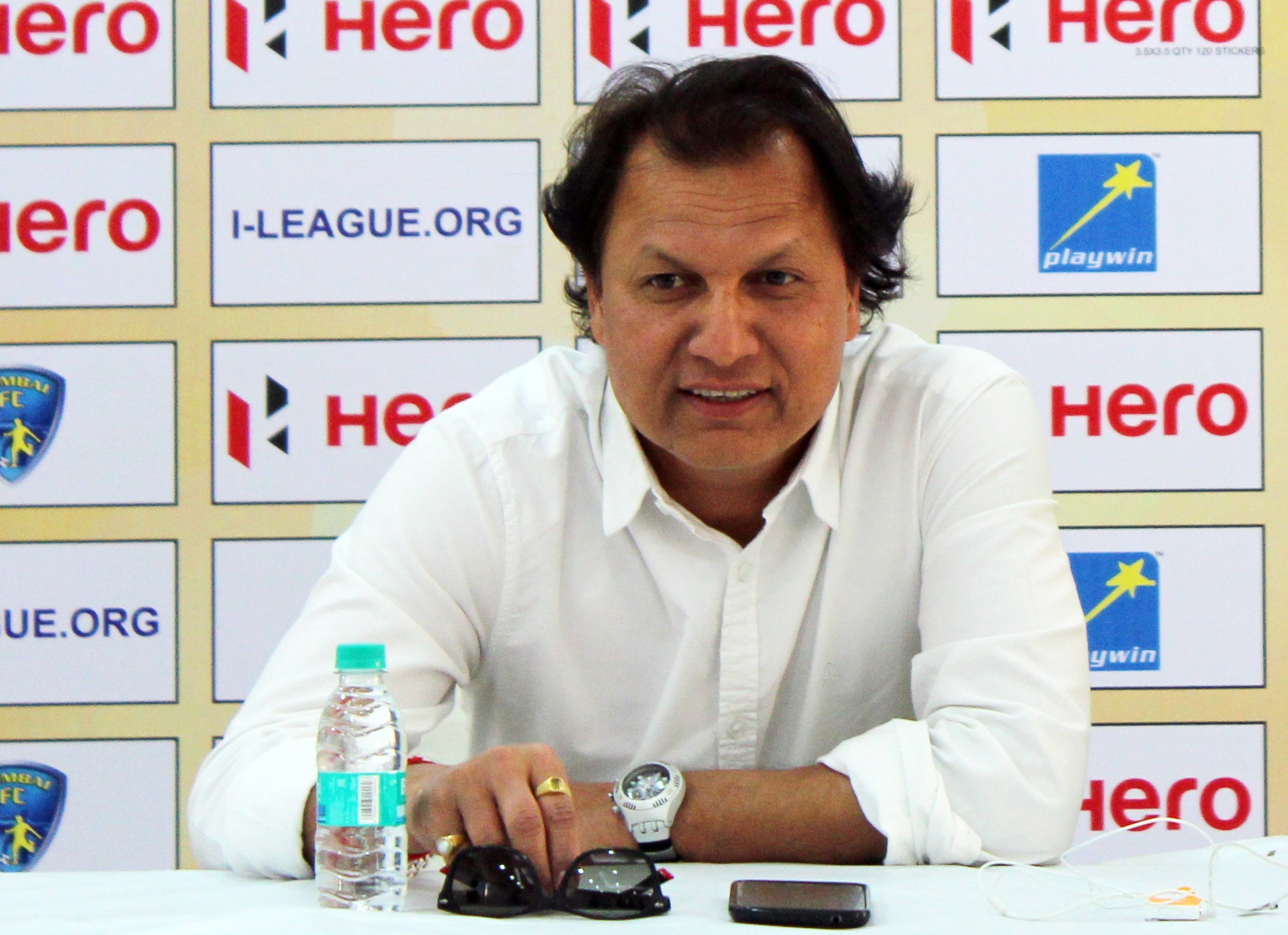
Santosh Kashyap as manager of Mumbai FC in 2016 during the team's press conference.

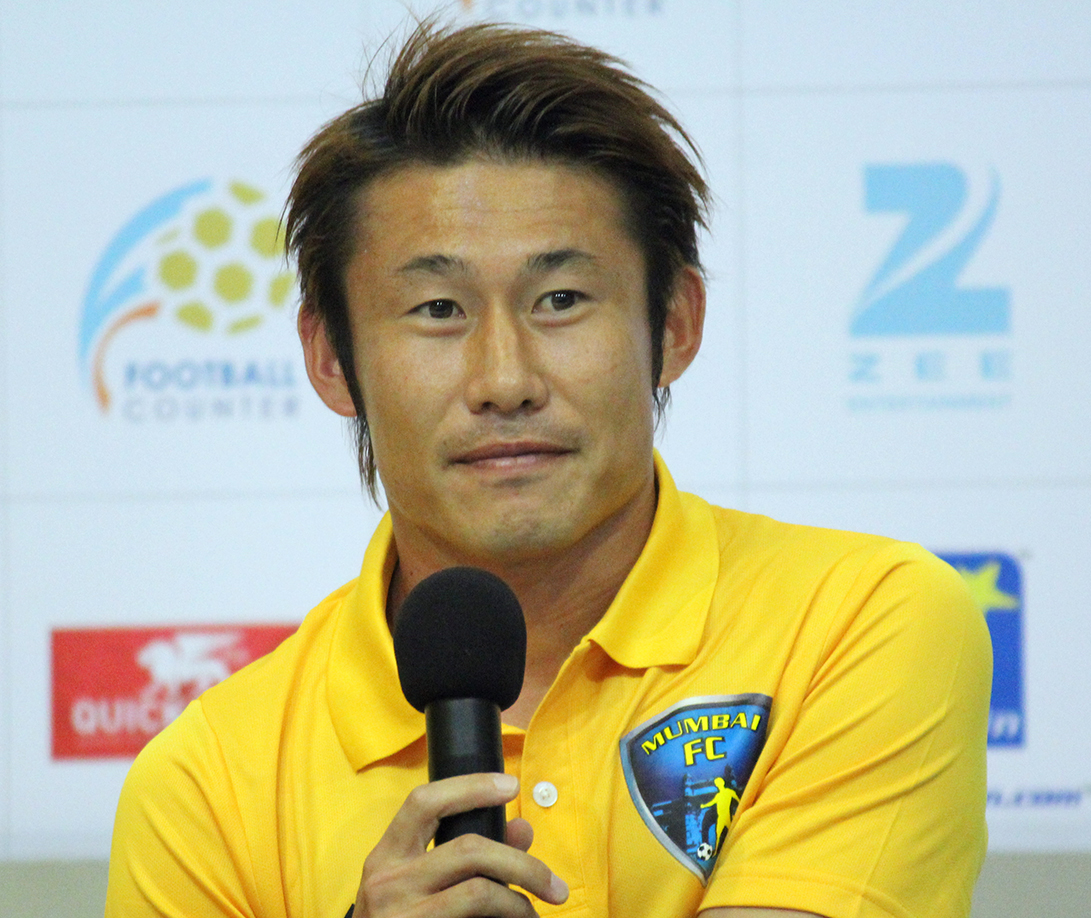
Japanese player Taisuke Matsugae with Mumbai in 2016

== See also ==
- Football clubs in Mumbai
- Defunct football clubs in India
- Sports in Maharashtra
