= 2015 FC Pune City season =

2nd season in existence of FC Pune City

Pune City
2015 season
- Chairman: Gaurav Modwel
- Head Coach: David Platt
- Stadium: Shree Shiv Chhatrapati Sports Complex
- Average home league attendance: 8,685

The 2015 Season is Pune City's 2nd season in existence in the Indian Super League.

== Transfers ==
In: Note: Flags indicate national team as defined under FIFA eligibility rules; some limited exceptions apply. Players may hold more than one non-FIFA nationality.

No.	Pos.	Nation	Player
2	DF	IND	Govin Singh (from (India) Royal Wahingdoh)
3	DF	ARG	Diego Colotto (from (Spain) Espanyol)
4	MF	CIV	Didier Zokora (from (Turkey) Akhisar Belediyespor)
5	DF	ENG	Roger Johnson (from (England) Charlton Athletic)
7	FW	CRC	Yendrick Ruiz (loan from (Costa Rica) Herediano)
8	MF	ENG	James Bailey (from (England) Barnsley)
9	FW	NGR	Kalu Uche (from (Spain) Levante)
10	FW	ROU	Adrian Mutu (from (Romania) Petrolul Ploiești)
11	MF	IND	Jackichand Singh (loan from (India) Royal Wahingdoh)
12	DF	IND	Pritam Kotal (loan from (India) Mohun Bagan)
15	DF	IND	Gurjinder Kumar (loan from (India) Salgaocar)
16	MF	IND	Eugeneson Lyngdoh (loan from (India) Bengaluru)
17	MF	TUR	Tuncay (from (Qatar) Umm Salal)
19	DF	IND	Gouramangi Singh (from (India) Chennaiyin)
20	DF	IND	Sushanth Mathew (from (India) Kerala Blasters)
22	DF	ENG	Nicky Shorey (from (England) Portsmouth)
23	MF	IND	Bikash Jairu (loan from (India) East Bengal)
25	GK	ENG	Steve Simonsen (from (Scotland) Rangers)
26	MF	NED	Wesley Verhoek (from (Netherlands) Feyenoord)
29	GK	IND	Lalit Thapa (from (India) Sporting Goa)
45	MF	IND	Fanai Lalrempuia (loan from (India) Pune)

Out: Note: Flags indicate national team as defined under FIFA eligibility rules; some limited exceptions apply. Players may hold more than one non-FIFA nationality.

No.	Pos.	Nation	Player
2	DF	COL	Andrés González (to (Peru) Alianza Atlético)
3	DF	KOR	Park Kwang-il (to (Japan) Matsumoto Yamaga)
4	DF	ITA	Daniele Magliocchetti (to (Italy) Aversa Normanna)
5	DF	ITA	Bruno Cirillo (to (Italy) Reggina)
7	MF	IND	Pratik Shinde
8	MF	IND	Tapan Maity (to (India) Bharat)
9	FW	ITA	Davide Colomba
10	MF	NED	John Goossens (to (Romania) Voluntari)
11	MF	IND	Ashutosh Mehta (loan return to (India) Mumbai)
12	DF	IND	Anupam Sarkar (loan to (India) Adeli Batumi)
15	MF	COL	Omar Andrés Rodríguez
16	DF	IND	Deepak Devrani (loan to (India) Mohun Bagan)
17	FW	FRA	David Trezeguet (Retired)
18	DF	BFA	Saïdou Panandétiguiri
20	FW	GEQ	Iván Bolado
21	MF	GRE	Kostas Katsouranis (to (Greece) Atromitos)
22	FW	IND	Joaquim Abranches (loan return to (India) East Bengal)
23	FW	NGR	Dudu (to (India) East Bengal)
25	GK	ITA	Emanuele Belardi (to (Italy) Reggina)
26	MF	IND	Mehrajuddin Wadoo (to (India) Chennaiyin)
31	MF	HUN	Krisztián Vadócz (to (Switzerland) Grasshopper)
32	MF	ENG	Jermaine Pennant (to (England) Wigan Athletic)

== Players and staff ==
=== Squad ===
Note: Flags indicate national team as defined under FIFA eligibility rules; some limited exceptions apply. Players may hold more than one non-FIFA nationality.

No.	Pos.	Nation	Player
2	DF	IND	Govin Singh
3	DF	ARG	Diego Colotto
4	MF	CIV	Didier Zokora (captain)
5	DF	ENG	Roger Johnson
6	MF	IND	Manish Maithani
7	FW	CRC	Yendrick Ruiz (on loan from Herediano)
8	MF	ENG	James Bailey
9	FW	NGR	Kalu Uche
10	FW	ROU	Adrian Mutu
11	FW	IND	Jackichand Singh (on loan from Royal Wahingdoh)
12	DF	IND	Pritam Kotal (on loan from Mohun Bagan)
13	DF	IND	Dharmaraj Ravanan
14	MF	IND	Israil Gurung

No.	Pos.	Nation	Player
15	DF	IND	Gurjinder Kumar (on loan from Salgaocar)
16	MF	IND	Eugeneson Lyngdoh (on loan from Bengaluru FC)
17	MF	TUR	Tuncay
19	DF	IND	Gouramangi Singh
20	MF	IND	Sushanth Mathew
22	DF	ENG	Nicky Shorey
23	MF	IND	Bikash Jairu (on loan from East Bengal)
24	MF	IND	Lenny Rodrigues
25	GK	ENG	Steve Simonsen
26	FW	NED	Wesley Verhoek
27	GK	IND	Arindam Bhattacharya
29	GK	IND	Lalit Thapa
45	MF	IND	Fanai Lalrempuia (on loan from Pune)

=== Coaching staff ===
Role	Name	Nation
Head coach	David Platt	(England)
Assistant coach	Renedy Singh	(India)
Goalkeeping coach	Massimo Battara	(Italy)
Fitness coach	Niall Clark	(England)
Physiotherapist	Matt Radcliffe	(England)

== Indian Super League ==
=== League table ===
Pos	Team	Pld	W	D	L	GF	GA	GD	Pts	Qualification or relegation
4	Delhi Dynamos	14	6	4	4	18	20	−2	22	Advance to ISL Play-offs
5	NorthEast United	14	6	2	6	18	23	−5	20	
6	Mumbai City	14	4	4	6	16	26	−10	16	
7	Pune City	14	4	3	7	17	23	−6	15	
8	Kerala Blasters	14	3	4	7	22	27	−5	13	

Source: Indian Super League standings
Rules for classification: 1) points; 2) goal difference; 3) number of goals scored.

=== Results summary ===
Overall								Home						Away					
Pld	W	D	L	GF	GA	GD	Pts	W	D	L	GF	GA	GD	W	D	L	GF	GA	GD
14	4	3	7	17	23	−6	15	4	1	2	11	8	+3	0	2	5	6	15	−9

Last updated: 5 December 2015.
Source: Matches

=== Results by round ===
Round	1	2	3	4	5	6	7	8	9	10	11	12	13	14
Ground	H	H	H	H	A	H	A	A	H	A	A	A	A	H
Result	W	W	L	W	L	W	D	L	D	D	L	L	L	L

Updated to match(es) played on 5 December 2015. Source: Matches
A = Away; H = Home; W = Win; D = Draw; L = Loss

=== Matches ===
5 October 2015 1	Pune City	3 – 1	Mumbai City	Pune
19:00 IST (UTC+5:30)	Tuncay (yellow card) 8' (goal) 12', 56'; Zokora (yellow card) 50'; Kumar (yellow card) 66'; Gurung 68'	Report	Piquionne 34'; Mehta (yellow card) 83'	Stadium: Shree Shiv Chhatrapati Sports Complex; Referee: Bhuvana Balasubramaniam

9 October 2015 2	Pune City	1 – 0	NorthEast United	Pune
19:00 IST (UTC+5:30)	Maithani (yellow card) 16'; Ralte 73' (o.g.)	Report	Silas (yellow card) 14'	Stadium: Shree Shiv Chhatrapati Sports Complex; Referee: Matthew Conger

14 October 2015 3	Pune City	1 – 2	Delhi Dynamos	Pune
19:00 IST (UTC+5:30)	Uche 90+8'	Report	R.Singh 23'; Riise (yellow card) 45'; Edathodika (yellow card) 60'; Gadze 90+7'	Stadium: Shree Shiv Chhatrapati Sports Complex

18 October 2015 4	Pune City	1 – 0	Atlético de Kolkata	Pune
19:00 IST (UTC+5:30)	J.Singh 2'	Report	Mohanraj (yellow card) 56'; Josemi (yellow card) 73'	Stadium: Shree Shiv Chhatrapati Sports Complex

24 October 2015 5	Chennaiyin	2 – 1	Pune City	Chennai
19:00 IST (UTC+5:30)	Blasi (yellow card) 2'; Bernard Mendy 34'; Mendoza 48'	Report	Ravanan (yellow card) 50'; Uche 75'; Johnson (yellow card) 53'; Lyngdoh (yellow card) 90'	Stadium: Jawaharlal Nehru Stadium; Attendance: 26,821

27 October 2015 6	Pune City	3 – 2	Kerala Blasters	Pune
19:00 IST (UTC+5:30)	Uche 16', 23'; Lyngdoh (yellow card) 60'; Tuncay 72'	Report	Rafi 1', 30'	Stadium: Shree Shiv Chhatrapati Sports Complex

30 October 2015 7	Goa	1 – 1	Pune City	Goa
19:00 IST (UTC+5:30)	Johnson 46' (o.g.)	Report	Lyngdoh 64' (yellow card) 66'; Uche (yellow card) 66'	Stadium: Fatorda Stadium

4 November 2015 8	Kerala Blasters	2 – 0	Pune City	Kochi
19:00 IST (UTC+5:30)	Dagnall 45+1'; Watt 60'; Ahmed (yellow card) 73'	Report	Zokora (yellow card) 59'	Stadium: Jawaharlal Nehru Stadium

8 November 2015 9	Pune City	2 – 2	Goa	Pune
19:00 IST (UTC+5:30)	Lyngdoh 32'; Mutu 90+4'	Report	Coelho 34'; Moura (yellow card) 36'; Lucca 44'	Stadium: Shree Shiv Chhatrapati Sports Complex

13 November 2015 10	Mumbai City	0 – 0	Pune City	Mumbai
19:00 IST (UTC+5:30)		Report	Zokora (yellow card) 87'	Stadium: DY Patil Stadium

19 November 2015 11	Delhi Dynamos	3 – 1	Pune City	Delhi
19:00 IST (UTC+5:30)	Nabi 35'; Edathodika 40'; Malouda (yellow card) 58'; Riise 87' (pen.)	Report	Johnson (yellow card) 13'; Shorey (yellow card) 51'; G.Singh (yellow card) 67' (yellow-red card) 86'; Mutu 90+5'	Stadium: Jawaharlal Nehru Stadium

27 November 2015 12	Atlético de Kolkata	4 – 1	Pune City	Kolkata
19:00 IST (UTC+5:30)	Hume 9', 47', 83'; Nato (yellow card) 38'; Lekić 90+4'	Report	Lyngdoh (yellow card) 27'; Maithani (yellow card) 45+2'; Mutu 86'	Stadium: Salt Lake Stadium

2 December 2015 13	NorthEast United	3 – 2	Pune City	Guwahati
19:00 IST (UTC+5:30)	Vélez 4'; Kamara 18' (yellow card) 90+5'; López (yellow card) 28'; Bikey 43' (yellow card) 61'; S.Singh (yellow card) 63'; Bruno (yellow card) 74'	Report	Bailey 8'; G.Singh (yellow card) 43'; Zokora (yellow card) 77'; Mutu 86'	Stadium: Indira Gandhi Athletic Stadium

5 December 2015 14	Pune City	0 – 1	Chennaiyin	Pune
19:00 IST (UTC+5:30)	Ravanan (yellow card) 57'; Lyngdoh (yellow card) 66'	Report	Elano (yellow card) 57'; Lalpekhlua 64'; Wadoo (yellow card) 89'	Stadium: Shree Shiv Chhatrapati Sports Complex

== Squad statistics ==
As of Match played 5 December 2015

=== Appearances and goals ===
No.	Pos	Nat	Player	Total		Indian Super League	
No.	Pos	Nat	Player	Apps	Goals	Apps	Goals
2	DF	(India) IND	Govin Singh	4	0	4	0
3	DF	(Argentina) ARG	Diego Colotto	3	0	3	0
4	MF	(Ivory Coast) CIV	Didier Zokora	12	0	12	0
5	DF	(England) ENG	Roger Johnson	11	0	10+1	0
6	MF	(India) IND	Manish Maithani	8	0	6+2	0
7	FW	(Costa Rica) CRC	Yendrick Ruiz	9	0	5+4	0
8	MF	(England) ENG	James Bailey	8	1	7+1	1
9	FW	(Nigeria) NGR	Kalu Uche	11	4	6+5	4
10	FW	(Romania) ROU	Adrian Mutu	10	4	7+3	4
11	FW	(India) IND	Jackichand Singh	9	1	6+3	1
12	DF	(India) IND	Pritam Kotal	2	0	2	0
13	DF	(India) IND	Dharmaraj Ravanan	10	0	9+1	0
14	MF	(India) IND	Israil Gurung	2	1	2	1
15	DF	(India) IND	Gurjinder Kumar	4	0	4	0
16	MF	(India) IND	Eugeneson Lyngdoh	9	2	9	2
17	MF	(Turkey) TUR	Tuncay	10	3	8+2	3
19	DF	(India) IND	Gouramangi Singh	8	0	8	0
20	MF	(India) IND	Sushanth Mathew	4	0	2+2	0
22	DF	(England) ENG	Nicky Shorey	14	0	14	0
23	MF	(India) IND	Bikash Jairu	11	0	3+8	0
24	MF	(India) IND	Lenny Rodrigues	9	0	9	0
25	GK	(England) ENG	Steve Simonsen	10	0	10	0
26	FW	(Netherlands) NED	Wesley Verhoek	6	0	2+4	0
27	GK	(India) IND	Arindam Bhattacharya	4	0	4	0
45	MF	(India) IND	Fanai Lalrempuia	3	0	2+1	0

=== Goal scorers ===
Place	Position	Nation	Number	Name	Indian Super League	Total
1	FW	(Nigeria)	9	Kalu Uche	4	4
1	MF	(Romania)	10	Adrian Mutu	4	4
3	MF	(Turkey)	17	Tuncay	3	3
4	FW	(India)	16	Eugeneson Lyngdoh	2	2
5	MF	(India)	14	Israil Gurung	1	1
5	FW	(India)	11	Jackichand Singh	1	1
5	MF	(England)	8	James Bailey	1	1
5				Own goal	1	1
				TOTALS	17	17

=== Disciplinary record ===
Number	Nation	Position	Name	Indian Super League		Total	
Number	Nation	Position	Name	Yellow card	Red card	Yellow card	Red card
2	(India)	DF	Govin Singh	3	1	3	1
4	(Ivory Coast)	MF	Didier Zokora	4	0	4	0
5	(England)	DF	Roger Johnson	2	0	2	0
6	(India)	MF	Manish Maithani	2	0	2	0
9	(Nigeria)	FW	Kalu Uche	1	0	1	0
13	(India)	DF	Dharmaraj Ravanan	2	0	2	0
15	(India)	DF	Gurjinder Kumar	1	0	1	0
16	(India)	MF	Eugeneson Lyngdoh	5	0	5	0
17	(Turkey)	MF	Tuncay	1	0	1	0
22	(England)	DF	Nicky Shorey	1	0	1	0
			TOTALS	21	1	21	1
