= 2014 FC Pune City season =

2014 season of FC Pune City

Pune City
2014 season
- Chairman: Gaurav Modwel
- Head Coach: Franco Colomba
- Stadium: Shree Shiv Chhatrapati Sports Complex
- ISL: 6th
- Top goalscorer: Kostas Katsouranis (4)
- Average home league attendance: 7,859

The 2014 Season was Pune City's 1st season in existence in the Indian Super League. They ended their first season on 6th as position of the inaugural edition of the Indian Super League.

== Signings ==
=== Foreign signings ===
#	Position:	Player	Last club	Date	Source
4	DF	(Italy) Daniele Magliocchetti	(Italy) Ascoli		
9	MF	(Italy) Davide Colomba	(Italy) Ascoli		
10	MF	(Netherlands) John Goossens	(Netherlands) Feyenoord	October 2014	
17	FW	(France) David Trezeguet	(Argentina) Newell's Old Boys	30 July 2014	
21	MF	(Greece) Kostas Katsouranis	(Greece) PAOK	1 October 2014	
23	FW	(Nigeria) Dudu	(India) East Bengal	29 September 2014	
31	MF	(Hungary) Krisztián Vadócz	(Denmark) OB	14 November 2014	
32	MF	(England) Jermaine Pennant	(England) Stoke City	6 November 2014	

=== Drafted domestic players ===
Round	Position	Player	I-League/Previous club
1	MF	(India) Lenny Rodrigues	Churchill Brothers
2	DF	(India) Dharmaraj Ravanan	Churchill Brothers
3	DF	(India) Ashutosh Mehta	Mumbai
4	FW	(India) Joaquim Abranches	East Bengal
5	DF	(India) Pritam Kotal	Mohun Bagan
6	MF	(India) Manish Maithani	Mohammedan
7	MF	(India) Israil Gurung	Mohammedan
8	DF	(India) Deepak Devrani	Sporting Goa
9	MF	(India) Tapan Maity	United Sports Club
10	GK	(India) Arindam Bhattacharya	Churchill Brothers
11	DF	(India) Anupam Sarkar	United Sports Club
12	MF	(India) Pratik Shinde	(United States) Houston Hurricanes
13	GK	(India) Lalit Thapa	Churchill Brothers
14	DF	(India) Mehrajuddin Wadoo	Mohammedan

=== Drafted foreign players ===
Round	Position	Player	Last Club
1	DF	(Italy) Bruno Cirillo	(Greece) AEK Athens
2	GK	(Italy) Emanuele Belardi	(Italy) Pescara
3	FW	(Equatorial Guinea) Iván Bolado	(Spain) Real Avilés
4	DF	(Burkina Faso) Saïdou Panandétiguiri	(South Africa) Chippa United
5	MF	(Colombia) Omar Andrés Rodríguez	(Colombia) Águilas Doradas
6	DF	(Colombia) Andrés González	(Colombia) Junior
7	DF	(South Korea) Park Kwang-il	(Japan) Matsumoto Yamaga

== Players and staff ==
=== Squad ===
Note: Flags indicate national team as defined under FIFA eligibility rules; some limited exceptions apply. Players may hold more than one non-FIFA nationality.

No.	Pos.	Nation	Player
1	GK	IND	Lalit Thapa
2	DF	COL	Andrés González
3	MF	KOR	Park Kwang-il
4	DF	ITA	Daniele Magliocchetti
5	DF	ITA	Bruno Cirillo
6	MF	IND	Manish Maithani
7	MF	IND	Pratik Shinde
8	MF	IND	Tapan Maity
9	MF	ITA	Davide Colomba
10	MF	NED	John Goossens
11	MF	IND	Ashutosh Mehta
12	DF	IND	Anupam Sarkar
13	DF	IND	Dharmaraj Ravanan
14	MF	IND	Israil Gurung
15	MF	COL	Omar Andrés Rodríguez

No.	Pos.	Nation	Player
16	DF	IND	Deepak Devrani
17	FW	FRA	David Trezeguet (Captain)
18	DF	BFA	Saïdou Panandétiguiri
19	DF	IND	Pritam Kotal
20	FW	GEQ	Iván Bolado
21	MF	GRE	Kostas Katsouranis
22	FW	IND	Joaquim Abranches
23	FW	NGR	Dudu
24	MF	IND	Lenny Rodrigues
25	GK	ITA	Emanuele Belardi
26	MF	IND	Mehrajuddin Wadoo
27	GK	IND	Arindam Bhattacharya
31	MF	HUN	Krisztián Vadócz
32	MF	ENG	Jermaine Pennant

=== Coaching staff ===
Role	Name	Nation
Head coach	Franco Colomba	Italy
Assistant coach	Giovanni Mei	Italy
Physical trainer	Juri Bartoli	Italy
Goalkeeping coach	Pietro Spinosa	Italy
Fitness and conditioning coach	Lena Fallkvist	Sweden

== Indian Super League ==
=== League table ===
Pos	Team	Pld	W	D	L	GF	GA	GD	Pts	Qualification
4	Kerala Blasters	14	5	4	5	9	11	−2	19	Advance to ISL Play-offs
5	Delhi Dynamos	14	4	6	4	16	14	+2	18	
6	Pune City	14	4	4	6	12	17	−5	16	
7	Mumbai City	14	4	4	6	12	21	−9	16	
8	NorthEast United	14	3	6	5	11	13	−2	15	

Source: Soccerway
Rules for classification: 1) points; 2) goal difference; 3) number of goals scored

=== Results summary ===
Overall								Home						Away					
Pld	W	D	L	GF	GA	GD	Pts	W	D	L	GF	GA	GD	W	D	L	GF	GA	GD
14	4	4	6	12	17	−5	16	3	2	2	8	5	+3	1	2	4	4	12	−8

Last updated: 27 August 2015.
Source: Matches

=== Results by round ===
Round	1	2	3	4	5	6	7	8	9	10	11	12	13	14
Ground	A	A	H	H	H	A	H	A	A	A	H	H	H	A
Result	D	L	W	L	W	W	D	D	L	L	D	W	L	L

Source: Matches
A = Away; H = Home; W = Win; D = Draw; L = Loss

=== Matches ===
14 October 2014 1	Delhi Dynamos	0 – 0	Pune City	Delhi
19:00 IST (UTC+5:30)		Report		Stadium: Jawaharlal Nehru Stadium; Referee: Pranjal Banerji

18 October 2014 2	Mumbai City	5 – 0	Pune City	Mumbai
19:00 IST (UTC+5:30)	Costa (yellow card) 3'; Moritz 12', 27', 71'; Singh 37'; Štohanzl (yellow card) 51'; Letzelter 85'	Report	Rodrigues (yellow card) 4'; Kotal (yellow card) 49'; Cirillo (yellow card) 70'; Rodríguez (yellow card) 85'	Stadium: DY Patil Stadium; Referee: Chris Penso

26 October 2014 4	Pune City	2 – 0	Goa	Pune
19:00 IST (UTC+5:30)	Katsouranis (yellow card) 14' (goal) 42'; Bolado (yellow card) 54'; Trezeguet 81'	Report		Stadium: Shree Shiv Chhatrapati Sports Complex; Referee: Pratap Singh

30 October 2014 4	Pune City	1 – 2	Kerala Blasters	Pune
19:00 IST (UTC+5:30)	Maity (yellow card) 3'; Trezeguet 15'	Report	Chettri (yellow card) 5'; Sabeeth 41'; Jhingan (yellow card) 43'; Orji 65'; James (yellow card) 89'	Stadium: Shree Shiv Chhatrapati Sports Complex; Referee: Tejas Nagvenkar

3 November 2014 5	Pune City	1 – 0	NorthEast United	Pune
19:00 IST (UTC+5:30)	Kotal (yellow card) 47'; Goossens 88'	Report	Yanes (yellow card) 90+5'	Stadium: Shree Shiv Chhatrapati Sports Complex; Referee: Muringothumalil Bhaskaran Santosh Kumar

7 November 2014 6	Atlético de Kolkata	1 – 3	Pune City	Kolkata
19:00 IST (UTC+5:30)	Nato (yellow card) 29'; Borja (yellow card) 34'; Josemi (yellow card) 70'; Teferra 84' (pen.)	Report	Kotal (yellow card) 15'; Dudu 35'; Katsouranis 55'; Gurung (yellow card) 67'; Bhattacharya (yellow card) 83'; Colomba 89'	Stadium: Salt Lake Stadium; Referee: Muringothumalil Bhaskaran Santosh Kumar

11 November 2014 7	Pune City	1 – 1	Chennaiyin	Pune
19:00 IST (UTC+5:30)	Katsouranis 9'; Magliocchetti (yellow card) 15'; Cirillo (yellow card) 28'	Report	Silvestre (yellow card) 45+2'; Mendoza 58'	Stadium: Shree Shiv Chhatrapati Sports Complex; Referee: Jarred Gillett

15 November 2014 8	NorthEast United	0 – 0	Pune City	Guwahati
19:00 IST (UTC+5:30)	Gurung (yellow card) 90+3'	Report	Katsouranis (yellow card) 31'	Stadium: Indira Gandhi Athletic Stadium; Referee: Pranjal Banerji

19 November 2014 9	Chennaiyin	3 – 1	Pune City	Chennai
19:00 IST (UTC+5:30)	Pelissari (yellow card) 58' (goal) 70'; Mendoza 62'; Mendy (yellow card) 72'; Djemba-Djemba (yellow card) 74'; Djordjic (yellow card) 90+3'; Lalpekhlua 90+4'	Report	Djemba-Djemba 70' (o.g.); Sarkar (yellow card) 80'; Ravanan (yellow card) 88'	Stadium: Jawaharlal Nehru Stadium; Referee: Ravshan Irmatov

22 November 2014 10	Goa	2 – 0	Pune City	Goa
19:00 IST (UTC+5:30)	Fernandes 6'; Desai (yellow card) 30'; Santos (yellow card) 69'; Fakhruddin (yellow card) 81'; Slepička 90+4'; Miranda (yellow card) 90+5'	Report	Ravanan (yellow card) 50'; Rodrigues (yellow card) 54'; Wadoo (yellow card) 90+1'	Stadium: Fatorda Stadium; Referee: Hettikankanamge Chrishantha Dilan Perera

29 November 2014 11	Pune City	1 – 1	Atlético de Kolkata	Pune
19:00 IST (UTC+5:30)	Katsouranis 45+1' (yellow card) 86'	Report	Podaný 11'; Masih (yellow card) 24'; Teferra (yellow card) 75'	Stadium: Shree Shiv Chhatrapati Sports Complex; Referee: Umesh Bora

3 December 2014 12	Pune City	2 – 0	Mumbai City	Pune
19:00 IST (UTC+5:30)	Cirillo (yellow card) 39'; Rodrigues (yellow card) 61'; Dudu 66', 80'	Report	Ribeiro (yellow card) 64'; Friedrich (yellow card) 64'	Stadium: Shree Shiv Chhatrapati Sports Complex; Referee: Baldomero Toledo

6 December 2014 13	Pune City	0 – 1	Delhi Dynamos	Pune
19:00 IST (UTC+5:30)	Rodrigues (yellow card) 17'; Bhattacharya (yellow card) 34'; Belardi (yellow card) 90+3'	Report	Marmentini (yellow card) 32' (goal) 88'	Stadium: Shree Shiv Chhatrapati Sports Complex; Referee: Ranjit Bakshi

9 December 2014 14	Kerala Blasters	1 – 0	Pune City	Kochi
19:00 IST (UTC+5:30)	Hume 23'; Gonsalves (yellow card) 66'; Nandy (yellow card) 90+10'	Report	Cirillo (yellow card) 87'; Katsouranis (yellow card) 90'; Bhattacharya (yellow card) 90+9'	Stadium: Jawaharlal Nehru Stadium; Referee: Samchrista Doss

== Squad statistics ==
As of Match played 9 December 2014

=== Appearances and goals ===
No.	Pos	Nat	Player	Total		Indian Super League	
No.	Pos	Nat	Player	Apps	Goals	Apps	Goals
2	DF	(Colombia) COL	Andrés González	4	0	1+3	0
3	DF	(South Korea) KOR	Park Kwang-il	8	0	4+4	0
4	DF	(Italy) ITA	Daniele Magliocchetti	8	0	8	0
5	DF	(Italy) ITA	Bruno Cirillo	14	0	14	0
6	MF	(India) IND	Manish Maithani	2	0	2	0
8	MF	(India) IND	Tapan Maity	1	0	1	0
9	MF	(Italy) ITA	Davide Colomba	6	1	6	1
10	MF	(Netherlands) NED	John Goossens	4	1	2+2	1
11	MF	(India) IND	Ashutosh Mehta	7	0	4+3	0
12	DF	(India) IND	Anupam Sarkar	7	0	6+1	0
13	DF	(India) IND	Dharmaraj Ravanan	13	0	12+1	0
14	MF	(India) IND	Israil Gurung	9	0	7+2	0
15	MF	(Colombia) COL	Omar Andrés Rodríguez	1	0	0+1	0
17	FW	(France) FRA	David Trezeguet	6	2	6	2
18	DF	(Burkina Faso) BFA	Saïdou Panandétiguiri	7	0	1+6	0
19	DF	(India) IND	Pritam Kotal	10	0	10	0
20	FW	(Equatorial Guinea) GEQ	Iván Bolado	7	0	3+4	0
21	MF	(Greece) GRE	Kostas Katsouranis	14	4	14	4
22	FW	(India) IND	Joaquim Abranches	2	0	0+2	0
23	FW	(Nigeria) NGR	Dudu	12	3	9+3	3
24	MF	(India) IND	Lenny Rodrigues	10	0	10	0
25	GK	(Italy) ITA	Emanuele Belardi	4	0	4	0
26	DF	(India) IND	Mehrajuddin Wadoo	10	0	8+2	0
27	GK	(India) IND	Arindam Bhattacharya	11	0	10+1	0
31	MF	(Hungary) HUN	Krisztián Vadócz	6	0	5+1	0
32	MF	(England) ENG	Jermaine Pennant	7	0	7	0

=== Goal scorers ===
Place	Position	Nation	Number	Name	Indian Super League	Total
1	MF	(Greece)	21	Kostas Katsouranis	4	4
2	FW	(Nigeria)	23	Dudu	3	3
3	FW	(France)	17	David Trezeguet	2	2
4	MF	(Netherlands)	10	John Goossens	1	1
4	MF	(Italy)	9	Davide Colomba	1	1
4				Own goal	1	1
				TOTALS	12	12

=== Disciplinary record ===
Number	Nation	Position	Name	Indian Super League		Total	
Number	Nation	Position	Name	Yellow card	Red card	Yellow card	Red card
4	(Italy)	DF	Daniele Magliocchetti	1	0	1	0
5	(Italy)	DF	Bruno Cirillo	4	0	4	0
8	(India)	MF	Tapan Maity	1	0	1	0
12	(India)	DF	Anupam Sarkar	1	0	1	0
13	(India)	DF	Dharmaraj Ravanan	2	0	2	0
14	(India)	MF	Israil Gurung	1	0	1	0
15	(Colombia)	MF	Omar Andrés Rodríguez	1	0	1	0
19	(India)	DF	Pritam Kotal	3	0	3	0
20	(Equatorial Guinea)	FW	Iván Bolado	1	0	1	0
21	(Greece)	MF	Kostas Katsouranis	4	0	4	0
24	(India)	MF	Lenny Rodrigues	4	0	4	0
25	(Italy)	GK	Emanuele Belardi	1	0	1	0
26	(India)	DF	Mehrajuddin Wadoo	1	0	1	0
27	(India)	GK	Arindam Bhattacharya	3	0	3	0
			TOTALS	28	0	28	0
