= List of FC Pune City players =

Football Club Pune City was a professional association football club based in Pune, India, that plays in Indian Super League. The club was formed in 2014 and played its first competitive match on 14 October 2014 and hold on Delhi Dynamos FC by 0-0 tie. The club had never won any ISL title. The Club was dissolved due to financial constrains before the advent of 2019–20.

== List of players ==
The list includes all the players registered under a FC Pune City contract. Some players might not have featured in a professional game for the club.

Name	Nat	Pos^{[NB]}	FC Pune City career	Apps	Goals	Ref
Emanuele Belardi	(Italy)	Goalkeeper	2014–2015	4	0	
Arindam Bhattacharya	(India)	Goalkeeper	2014–2017	16	0	
Lalit Thapa	(India)	Goalkeeper	2014–2015	0	0	
Anupam Sarkar	(India)	Defender	2014-2015	6	0	
Deepak Devrani	(India)	Defender	2014	0	0	
Andrés González	(Colombia)	Defender	2014	4	0	
Bruno Cirillo	(Italy)	Defender	2014	14	0	
Daniele Magliocchetti	(Italy)	Defender	2014	8	0	
Dharmaraj Ravanan	(India)	Defender	2014-2017	34	0	
Saïdou Panandétiguiri	(Burkina Faso)	Defender	2014	7	0	
Mehrajuddin Wadoo	(India)	Defender	2014	10	0	
Ashutosh Mehta	(India)	Defender	2014, 2018-2019	14	0	
Pritam Kotal	(India)	Defender	2014-2015	12	0	
Tapan Maity	(India)	Midfielder	2014-2015	1	0	
Kostas Katsouranis	(Greece)	Midfielder	2014-2015	14	4	
Lenny Rodrigues	(India)	Midfielder	2014-2017	29	1	
Krisztián Vadócz	(Hungary)	Midfielder	2014	6	0	
Manish Maithani	(India)	Midfielder	2014	10	0	
Park Kwang-il	(South Korea)	Midfielder	2014	8	0	
Omar Rodríguez	(Colombia)	Midfielder	2014	1	0	
Davide Colomba	(Italy)	Midfielder	2014	6	1	
Israil Gurung	(India)	Midfielder	2014, 2016	11	1	
John Goossens	(Netherlands)	Midfielder	2014	4	1	
Pratik Shinde	(India)	Midfielder	2014	0	0	
Jermaine Pennant	(Jamaica)	Forward	2014	7	0	
