= List of FC Pune City records and statistics =

FC Pune City (FCPC) is an Indian professional football club based in the city of Pune, Maharashtra, which plays in the Indian Super League. The club was formed in 2014 with a philosophy to provide stimulus to the growth and development of football in the state of Maharashtra and to participate in the inaugural season of the Indian Super League. The team is owned by Rajesh Wadhawan Group, its promoters Mr. Kapil Wadhawan and Mr. Dheeraj Wadhawan and actor Arjun Kapoor.

The philosophy behind the inception of the club was to promote and develop the game of football in the city of Pune right from the grassroots levels onwards. FC Pune City aims to be the club which players aspire to be a part of and a club to whom fans pledge their loyalties.

In 2016, FC Pune City became the only professional football club in India to have teams which participated at all levels of professional football; Senior Team (ISL), U-18 Team (I-League U-18), U- 16 Team, U-14 Team and the Women's Team.

== Team records ==
=== Seasons ===
As of 17 March 2018

Year	ISL Regular season								Finals	Top Scorer(s)	
Year	P	W	D	L	GF	GA	Pts	Pos.	Finals	Player(s)	Goals
2014	14	4	4	6	12	17	16	6th	DNQ	(Greece) Kostas Katsouranis	4
2015	14	4	3	7	17	23	15	7th	DNQ	(Nigeria) Kalu Uche (Romania) Adrian Mutu	4
2016	14	4	4	6	13	16	16	6th	DNQ	(Mexico) Aníbal Zurdo	5
2017-18	18	9	3	6	30	21	30	3rd	Semi finals	(Uruguay) Emiliano Alfaro	6

== Head coach's record ==
As of 27 August 2019

Name	Nationality	From	To	P	W	D	L	GF	GA	Win%
Franco Colomba	Italy	22 June 2014	20 December 2014	14	4	4	6	12	17	28.57
David Platt	England	2 June 2015	20 December 2015	14	4	3	7	17	23	28.57
Antonio López Habas	Spain	25 April 2016	15 September 2017	14	4	4	6	13	16	28.57
Miguel Martinez Gonzalez (Caretaker)	Spain	3 October 2016	3 October 2016	1	0	0	1	0	1	0.00
Ranko Popović	Serbia	25 September 2017	31 May 2018	18	9	3	6	30	21	50.00
Miguel Ángel Portugal	Spain	1 June 2018	26 October 2018	3	0	1	2	1	6	0.00
Pradhyum Reddy (Interim-Manager)	India	26 October 2018	24 December 2018	9	3	1	5	10	15	33.33
Phil Brown	England	24 December 2018	27 August 2019	7	3	3	1	14	13	42.86
Marcos Paqueta	Brazil	1 June 2018	27 August 2018	0	0	0	0	0	0	0.00

== Player records ==
- Youngest player to play- Fanai Lalrempuia (19 years and 148 years old, debut against Northeast United on 9 October 2015)
- Oldest player- Robertino Pugliara (33 years and 323 years old, debut against Chennaiyin FC on 13 January 2018)
- Top goalscorer- Emiliano Alfaro (19 goals, 0.47 per match)
