= 2021–22 ATK Mohun Bagan FC season =

Indian football club season

ATK Mohun Bagan
2021–22 season
- Head coach: Antonio López Habas (until 18 December); Juan Ferrando (from 20 December)
- Stadium: Vivekananda Yuba Bharati Krirangan; Pandit Jawaharlal Nehru Stadium (centralised venue for ISL)
- Indian Super League: 3rd
- Calcutta Football League: Withdrew
- ISL Playoffs: Semi-finalist
- AFC Cup: 2021: Inter-zone play-off semi-finalist; 2022: Inter-zone play-off semi-finalist (Note: The knockout stage is to be played in September 2022, which falls under 2022–23 football season, therefore the upcoming matches have been moved to 2022–23 ATK Mohun Bagan FC season.)
- Top goalscorer: League: Liston Colaco (8 goals); All: Liston Colaco (13 goals)
- Average home league attendance: 🔒 Closed Doors (Note: Matches were played behind closed doors due to COVID-19 pandemic in Asia)
Home colours	Away colours
- All statistics correct as of 24 May 2022.

The 2021–22 ATK Mohun Bagan FC season was the club's 2nd season in Indian Super League and 132nd season since its establishment in 1889. The club though initially participated in the Calcutta Football League, later withdrew before the start of their campaign.

== Summary ==
=== June ===
The club began the season with the signing of Hyderabad FC player Liston Colaco for an undisclosed fee, which is believed to be around $161,000. Finnish midfielder Joni Kauko became their next signing which was completed just a few days after Finland were knocked out of the UEFA Euro 2020.

=== July ===
On 8 July, the club announced the signing of Hugo Boumous from Mumbai City FC on a record transfer fee which is believed to be $280,000 in a first time ever in India, a 5-year deal. On the other hand, ATK Mohun Bagan defender Sandesh Jhingan moved to Croatia after agreeing to a free transfer deal with HNK Šibenik.

=== August ===
The 21 men squad for the campaign was announced on 14 August. The four foreigners in the squad were revealed to be Carl McHugh, Hugo Boumous, Roy Krishna and David Williams. ATK Mohun Bagan reached Malé on 15 August and kicked-off their AFC Cup 2021 campaign on 18 August with a victory against their domestic rivals Bengaluru FC by 2–0 as captain Krishna and Bose found the back of the net. They registered their second victory of the tournament with a win over Maziya S&RC by 3–1. The team produced a 1–1 draw against Bashundhara Kings to advance to the inter-zone semi-final of AFC Cup. ATK Mohun Bagan was set to start their 2021–22 CFL Premier Division A campaign on 29 August against George Telegraph SC but the club, on 28 August, officially informed IFA (WB) that they would skip CFL, due to the clash of AFC Cup inter-zone playoff semi-final occurring on 22 September with the CFL matches. The club also found the risk of having players either injured or getting COVID-19 positive due the lack of bio bubbles in the CFL, moreover the foreign players had already returned to their respective countries, and few domestic players got selected to represent India in the 2021 SAFF Championship. Meanwhile Antonio Habas returned home in Spain and said the need of a break for the players was essential after the AFC Cup group stage matches involving intense and painstaking work in 7 days. Therefore, all the teams were given walkover against ATK Mohun Bagan in the CFL.

=== September ===
The club mutually agreed to terminate the contract of their first choice goalkeeper, Arindam Bhattacharya, who also won the Golden Glove in the previous season, and moved to their city rivals, SC East Bengal. The team flew to Dubai on 11 September for a six-day training camp to train and acclimatise for the upcoming match in Qarshi. The only major change in the squad was Boumous replaced by Kauko after suffering an injury. On 22 September, ATK Mohun Bagan ended their AFC Cup campaign with a heavy defeat of 0–6 against FC Nasaf Qarshi in the inter-zonal semi-final, thus equaled Mohun Bagan's worst defeat record in AFC Cup.

=== October ===
ATK Mohun Bagan began their pre-season training camp in Goa on 18 October.

=== November ===
On 19 November, the club began its 2021–22 ISL season with a high scoring win of 4–2 against Kerala Blasters FC as Boumous scored a brace, while Krishna and Colaco scored a goal each. The team also achieved the Derby win in its second matchday.

=== December ===
ATK Mohun Bagan had its biggest defeat in ISL until then, on their third matchday against Mumbai City FC by 5–1. The effect of the big setback continued as the team lost the next match against Jamshedpur FC and drew the matches against Chennaiyin FC and Bengaluru FC. On 18 December, Habas announced his resignation from the duties as the team's head coach. After a numerous speculations, on the next evening, FC Goa president announced that their serving head coach, Juan Ferrando had decided to join ATK Mohun Bagan, through a buy-out clause. This move made him the highest paid coach in the ISL and also set a new record in the Indian football transfer history. Ferrando joined the camp on 21 December and faced NorthEast United FC the same evening, which ended with his first win as the ATK Mohun Bagan head coach. Boumous became the first ISL player to feature in FIFA Ultimate Team of the Week as he got placed in the TOTW15.

=== January ===
During the club's first match of 2022, Williams set the record for the fastest goal in the ISL history by scoring against Hyderabad FC at 12 seconds, but the match ended with a draw. Jhingan returned as the club's first signing during the winter transfer window. The next match, against Odisha FC, was postponed as one of the players of ATK Mohun Bagan, reportedly Krishna, tested COVID-19 positive on the matchday. The following matches against Bengaluru FC and Kerala Blasters FC were suspended as well due to numerous positive cases among the clubs. The team resumed play on 23 January with their rescheduled match against Odisha FC, that ended in a goalless draw. Before the second Derby of the season, the club announced the arrival of veteran Indian goalkeeper Subrata Paul on loan from Hyderabad FC. Tiri became the first foreigner to make 100 appearances in ISL as he started for the Derby. Kiyan Nassiri became the youngest goalscorer of the club and the youngest hattrick scorer of ISL at the age of 21 years 2 months and 12 days, as he led his team to a Derby win by two goals margin. This was the fifth Derby win in a row in all competitions since 2019.

=== February ===
A revised schedule of the league was released for the previously postponed matches as well as all the matches from 9 February onwards. The team extended their unbeaten run with wins against Hyderabad FC, NorthEast United FC, FC Goa and Benguluru FC, and draws against Mumbai City FC, Kerala Blasters FC and Odisha FC.

=== March ===
ATK Mohun Bagan qualified for the ISL playoffs by beating Chennaiyin FC and also matched FC Goa's 15 matches unbeaten record in ISL. On the final matchday, with at least a two goals margin win required to become the ISL Premiers, the team lost against Jamshedpur FC and finished 3rd in the league table. In the 1st leg of semifinal, ATK Mohun Bagan suffered a heavy defeat of 3–1 against Hyderabad, and in the 2nd leg, the team won by 1–0 but failed to win by aggregate score.

=== April ===
ATK Mohun Bagan began their preparations for the upcoming continental games at their home venue, Kolkata from 1 April. After relaxation in the registration limits of foreigners in 2021, the club could include all of their foreigners in their squad. The team qualified for the AFC Cup group stage by convincingly beating Blue Star SC and Abahani Ltd. Dhaka in the qualifying stage.

=== May ===
On 2 May the AIFF announced the dates for India's friendly games in May, among which a match against ATK Mohun Bagan was also scheduled on 11 May, which was decided as a preparatory match for the club's upcoming AFC Cup group stage campaign. The team played the friendlies against 2021–22 Santosh Trophy runners-up West Bengal on 5 May and India on the scheduled date. In the opening match of AFC Cup Group D, ATK Mohun Bagan suffered a loss of 4–2 against Gokulam Kerala FC. The team got back and cruised past Bashundhara Kings and Maziya S&RC with dominating performances to qualify for the inter-zone play-off semi-final.

== Players ==
First team players
Squad No.	Name	Nationality	Date of Birth & Age	Appearances	Goals
Goalkeepers
1	Amrinder Singh	(India)	27 May 1993 (age 33)	28	0
28	Subrata Paul	(India)	24 November 1986 (age 39)	1	0
31	Arsh Anwer Sheikh	(India)	9 July 2002 (age 24)	3	0
Defenders
2	Sumit Rathi	(India)	26 August 2001 (age 25)	11	0
3	Gursimrat Singh Gill	(India)	2 November 1997 (age 28)	4	0
4	Tiri	(Spain)	14 July 1991 (age 35)	41	0
5	Sandesh Jhingan	(India)	21 July 1993 (age 33)	33	0
6	Ashutosh Mehta	(India)	21 February 1992 (age 34)	40 (Note: Has Previously played 18 games for Mohun Bagan (2019-20))	0
13	Ravi Bahadur Rana	(India)	15 October 2002 (age 23)	4	0
15	Subhasish Bose	(India)	18 August 1995 (age 31)	70 (Note: Has Previously played 19 matches for Mohun Bagan (2016-17))	3
20	Pritam Kotal	(India)	8 September 1993 (age 33)	134 (Note: Has Previously played 81 matches for Mohun Bagan (2013-17))	6
33	Prabir Das	(India)	20 December 1993 (age 32)	87 (Note: Has Previously played 43 matches for Mohun Bagan (2015-17))	1
Midfielders
7	Joni Kauko	(Finland)	12 July 1990 (age 36)	26	7
8	Carl McHugh	(Republic of Ireland)	5 February 1993 (age 33)	45	1
10	Hugo Boumous	(France)	24 July 1995 (age 31)	21	5
16	Abhishek Suryavanshi	(India)	12 March 2001 (age 25)	6	0
18	Ningomba Engson Singh	(India)	2 January 2003 (age 23)	3	0
19	Bidyananda Singh	(India)	27 November 1997 (age 28)	7	0
22	Deepak Tangri	(India)	1 February 1999 (age 27)	25	0
23	Michael Soosairaj	(India)	30 October 1994 (age 31)	7	0
24	Lenny Rodrigues	(India)	10 May 1987 (age 39)	53 (Note: Has Previously played 19 matches for Mohun Bagan (2015-16))	0
27	Sk. Sahil	(India)	28 April 2000 (age 26)	32 (Note: Has Previously played 20 matches for Mohun Bagan (2019-20))	0
Forwards
9	David Williams	(Australia)	26 February 1988 (age 38)	46	16
11	Manvir Singh	(India)	6 November 1995 (age 30)	54	15
17	Liston Colaco	(India)	12 November 1998 (age 27)	30	13
21	Roy Krishna	(Fiji)	30 August 1987 (age 39)	46	24
25	Kiyan Nassiri	(India)	17 November 2000 (age 25)	19 (Note: Has Previously played 2 matches for Mohun Bagan (2019-20))	3
99	Md. Fardin Ali Molla	(India)	10 April 2002 (age 24)	1	0

== Transfers ==
=== In ===
No.	Pos	Player	Transferred from	Fee	Date
1	GK	(India) Amrinder Singh	(India) Mumbai City	Free transfer	1 August 2021
3	DF	(India) Gursimrat Singh Gill	(India) Sudeva Delhi	Free transfer	1 October 2021
5	DF	(India) Sandesh Jhingan	(Croatia) Šibenik	Free transfer	6 January 2022
6	DF	(India) Ashutosh Mehta	(India) NorthEast United	Free transfer	1 August 2021
7	MF	(Finland) Joni Kauko	(Denmark) Esbjerg fB	Free transfer	1 August 2021
10	MF	(France) Hugo Boumous	(India) Mumbai City	₹1,88,30,000	1 August 2021
13	MF	(India) Ravi Bahadur Rana	Free Agent	Free transfer	1 October 2021
14	MF	(India) Ricky Shabong	(India) Indian Arrows	Free transfer	1 August 2021
17	FW	(India) Liston Colaco	(India) Hyderabad	₹94,10,000	1 August 2021
19	MF	(India) Bidyananda Singh	(India) Mumbai City	Free transfer	1 August 2021
22	MF	(India) Deepak Tangri	(India) Chennaiyin	Free transfer	1 August 2021
28	GK	(India) Subrata Paul	(India) Hyderabad	Loan transfer	27 January 2022
99	FW	(India) Md. Fardin Ali Molla	(India) Mohammedan	Loan return	1 August 2021

=== Out ===
No.	Pos	Player	Transferred to	Fee	Date
4	FW	(India) Komal Thatal	(India) Jamshedpur	Free transfer	20 August 2021
5	DF	(India) Sandesh Jhingan	(Croatia) Šibenik	Free transfer	1 August 2021
10	MF	(Spain) Edu García	(India) Hyderabad	Free transfer	1 August 2021
11	MF	(Australia) Brad Inman	(India) Mumbai City	Free transfer	1 August 2021
14	MF	(India) Ricky Shabong	(India) Rajasthan United	Loan transfer	31 January 2022
16	MF	(India) Jayesh Rane	(India) Bengaluru	Free transfer	1 August 2021
17	MF	(India) Pronoy Halder	(India) Jamshedpur	Loan transfer	1 August 2021
19	MF	(Spain) Javi Hernández	(India) Odisha	Free transfer	1 August 2021
22	MF	(India) Jobby Justin	(India) Chennaiyin	Free transfer	25 July 2021
29	GK	(India) Arindam Bhattacharya	(India) East Bengal	Contract termination	6 September 2021
–	DF	(England) John Johnson	(India) RoundGlass Punjab	Contract termination	1 September 2021
–	DF	(India) Salam Ranjan Singh	(India) Chennaiyin	Free transfer	1 July 2021
–	GK	(India) Aryan Niraj Lamba	(India) Kerala United	Loan transfer	5 July 2021
–	GK	(India) Surajit Pramanik	Free Agent	Contract termination	1 May 2021

== Competitions ==
=== Overview ===
Competition	First match (Round)	Latest match (Round)	Final Position
AFC Cup (2021)	18 August 2021 (group stage)	22 September 2021 (Inter-zone play-off semi-final)	Inter-zonal semifinalist
Indian Super League	19 November 2021 (Round 1)	16 March 2022 (semifinals)	3rd of 11; Semifinalist
AFC Cup (2022)	12 April 2022 (Preliminary round 2)	24 May 2022 (group stage)	Inter-zonal semifinalist

Competition	Record							
Competition	Pld	W	D	L	GF	GA	GD	Win %
2021 AFC Cup	4	2	1	1	6	8	−2	50.00
Indian Super League	22	11	7	4	39	29	+10	50.00
2022 AFC Cup	5	4	0	1	19	7	+12	80.00
Total	31	17	8	6	64	44	+20	54.84

Last updated: 24 May 2022
Source: Competitions

=== 2021 AFC Cup ===
==== Group stage ====
===== Group table =====
Pos	Team	Pld	W	D	L	GF	GA	GD	Pts	Qualification	MBSG	BSK	BFC	MAZ
1	(India) ATK Mohun Bagan	3	2	1	0	6	2	+4	7	Inter-zone play-off semi-finals	—	1–1	2–0	—
2	(Bangladesh) Bashundhara Kings	3	1	2	0	3	1	+2	5		—	—	—	2–0
3	(India) Bengaluru	3	1	1	1	6	4	+2	4		—	0−0	—	—
4	(Maldives) Maziya (H)	3	0	0	3	3	11	−8	0		1–3	—	2–6	—

Source: AFC
Rules for classification: Tiebreakers
(H) Hosts

===== Matches =====
18 August 2021 1	ATK Mohun Bagan (India)	2–0	(India) Bengaluru	Malé, Maldives
16:00 UTC+5	Krishna 39'; Bose 46'; Boumous (yellow card) 64'; Rathi (yellow card) 77'	Report	Silva (yellow card) 10'; Wangjam (yellow card) 90+4'	Stadium: National Football Stadium; Attendance: 0 Referee: (Jordan) Mohammad Arafah; Man of the Match: Roy Krishna (ATK Mohun Bagan)

21 August 2021 2	Maziya (Maldives)	1–3	(India) ATK Mohun Bagan	Malé, Maldives
21:00 UTC+5	Ibrahim 25'; Nihan (yellow card) 41'; Yaamin (yellow card) 80'	Report	Tangri (yellow card) 7'; Colaco 48'; Krishna 64'; Singh 77'; Boumous (yellow card) 80'	Stadium: National Football Stadium; Attendance: 0 Referee: (Hong Kong) Ping-Wun Tam; Man of the Match: Roy Krishna (ATK Mohun Bagan)

24 August 2021 3	ATK Mohun Bagan (India)	1–1	(Bangladesh) Bashundhara Kings	Malé, Maldives
16:00 UTC+5	Kotal (yellow card) 13'; Tangri (yellow card) 49'; Williams 62'	Report	Becerra (yellow card) 6'; Ghosh (yellow card) 20'; Fernandes 28'; Zoni (yellow card) 39'; Fahad (yellow card) 45'; Tripura (red card) 45+3'; Fernandes (yellow card) 80'	Stadium: National Football Stadium; Attendance: 0 Referee: (Oman) Qasim Al-Hatmi; Man of the Match: Jonathan Fernandes (Bashundhara Kings)

==== Knockout stage ====
===== Match =====
22 September 2021 Inter-zone play-off semi-final	Nasaf Qarshi (Uzbekistan)	6–0	(India) ATK Mohun Bagan	Qarshi, Uzbekistan
20:00 UTC+5	Kotal 4' (o.g.); Norchaev 18', 21', 31'; Bozorov 45+1'; Narzullaev 71'; Sadullayev (yellow card) 79'	Report	Bose (yellow card) 27'; Mehta (yellow card) 65'	Stadium: Markaziy Stadium; Attendance: 5,865; Referee: (Syria) Hanna Hattab; Man of the Match: Khusain Norchaev (Nasaf Qarshi)

=== Indian Super League ===
==== League table ====
Pos	Team	Pld	W	D	L	GF	GA	GD	Pts	Qualification
1	Jamshedpur (L)	20	13	4	3	42	21	+21	43	Qualification to ISL playoffs and Playoffs for 2023–24 AFC Champions League group stage
2	Hyderabad (Note: Hyderabad qualified for Playoffs for 2023–24 AFC Cup qualifying playoffs by winning the ISL playoffs) (C)	20	11	5	4	43	23	+20	38	Qualification to ISL playoffs and Playoffs for 2023–24 AFC Cup qualifying playoffs
3	ATK Mohun Bagan	20	10	7	3	37	26	+11	37	Qualification to ISL playoffs
4	Kerala Blasters	20	9	7	4	34	24	+10	34	Qualification to ISL playoffs
5	Mumbai City	20	9	4	7	36	31	+5	31	

Source: Indian Super League
Rules for classification: 1) points; 2) head-to-head points; 3) head-to-head goal difference; 4) head-to-head goals scored; 5) goal difference; 6) number of goals scored; 7) fair play ranking; 8) drawing of lots
(C) Champions; (L) League Winners' Shield Winners

==== Result summary ====
Overall								Home						Away					
Pld	W	D	L	GF	GA	GD	Pts	W	D	L	GF	GA	GD	W	D	L	GF	GA	GD
20	10	7	3	37	26	+11	37	5	3	2	18	14	+4	5	4	1	19	12	+7

==== Results by round ====
To preserve chronological evolvements, the postponed matches are not included to the round at which it was originally scheduled, but added to the full round they were played immediately afterwards. For example, if the match which was previously scheduled for round 10, but then played between rounds 11 and 12, it was added to the standings for round 11.

Round	1	2	3	4	5	6	7	8	9	10	11	12	13	14	15	16	17	18	19	20
Venue	H	A	H	A	H	A	A	H	H	H	H	A	A	H	A	A	A	H	A	H
Result	W	W	L	L	D	D	W	W	D	D	W	D	W	W	W	D	D	W	W	L
Position	1	1	4	5	6	6	5	3	3	7	4	5	4	2	2	1	3	3	2	3

Updated to match(es) played on 7 March 2022. Source: Indian Super League
A = Away; H = Home; W = Win; D = Draw; L = Loss

==== Matches ====
19 November 2021 1	ATK Mohun Bagan	4–2	Kerala Blasters	Fatorda, Goa
19:30 IST	Boumous 2', 39'; Krishna 27' (pen.); McHugh (yellow card) 38'; Colaco 50'; Tangri (yellow card) 82'	Report	Samad 24'; Gomes (yellow card) 26'; Khabra (yellow card) 55'; Díaz 69'	Stadium: PJN Stadium; Attendance: 0 Referee: Harish Kundu; Man of the Match: Hugo Boumous (ATK Mohun Bagan)

27 November 2021 2	East Bengal	0–3	ATK Mohun Bagan	Vasco da Gama, Goa
19:30 IST	Hnamte (yellow card) 7'; Sidoel (yellow card) 27'; Perošević (yellow card) 82'	Report	Krishna 12'; M Singh 14'; Colaco 23'	Stadium: Tilak Maidan; Attendance: 0 Referee: Rahul Kumar Gupta; Man of the Match: Joni Kauko (ATK Mohun Bagan)

1 December 2021 3	ATK Mohun Bagan	1–5	Mumbai City	Fatorda, Goa
19:30 IST	Tangri (yellow card) 32' (yellow-red card) 46'; Williams 60'; Bose (yellow card) 61'	Report	VP Singh 4', 25'; Angulo 38'; Fall 47'; B Singh 52'; Desai (yellow card) 74'; G Singh (yellow card) 85'	Stadium: PJN Stadium; Attendance: 0 Referee: C.R. Srikrishna; Man of the Match: Vikram Pratap Singh (Mumbai City)

6 December 2021 4	Jamshedpur	2–1	ATK Mohun Bagan	Bambolim, Goa
19:30 IST	Sabiá (yellow card) 3'; Doungel 37'; Halder (yellow card) 74'; Rehenesh (yellow card) 84'; Stewart (yellow card) 84'; Alex 84'	Report	Krishna (yellow card) 45+1'; Boumous (yellow card) 75'; Kotal 88'	Stadium: GMC Athletic Stadium; Attendance: 0 Referee: Rowan Arumughan; Man of the Match: Jitendra Singh (Jamshedpur)

11 December 2021 5	ATK Mohun Bagan	1–1	Chennaiyin	Fatorda, Goa
19:30 IST	Colaco 18'; Tiri (yellow card) 22'	Report	R Singh (yellow card) 25'; Koman 45'	Stadium: PJN Stadium; Attendance: 0 Referee: Rahul Kumar Gupta; Man of the Match: Anirudh Thapa (Chennaiyin)

16 December 2021 6	Bengaluru	3–3	ATK Mohun Bagan	Bambolim, Goa
19:30 IST	Silva 18' (pen.); Bhat 26'; Kamaraj (yellow card) 39'; NR Singh (yellow card) 69'; Ibara 72'; U Singh (yellow card) 81'	Report	Bose 13'; Boumous 38' (yellow card) 43'; Krishna 58' (pen.)	Stadium: GMC Athletic Stadium; Attendance: 0 Referee: Crystal John; Man of the Match: Subhasish Bose (ATK Mohun Bagan)

21 December 2021 7	NorthEast United	2–3	ATK Mohun Bagan	Fatorda, Goa
19:30 IST	Suhair 2'; Shereef 87'	Report	Colaco 45+2'; Boumous 52', 76'	Stadium: PJN Stadium; Attendance: 0 Referee: Harish Kundu; Man of the Match: Liston Colaco (ATK Mohun Bagan)

29 December 2021 8	ATK Mohun Bagan	2–1	Goa	Fatorda, Goa
19:30 IST	Colaco 23'; Krishna 56'; Boumous (yellow card) 60'	Report	Nemil (yellow card) 64'; Ortiz 81'	Stadium: PJN Stadium; Attendance: 0 Referee: Crystal John; Man of the Match: Liston Colaco (ATK Mohun Bagan)

8 January 2022 9	ATK Mohun Bagan	2–2	Hyderabad	Fatorda, Goa
19:30 IST	Williams 1' (yellow card) 45+8'; Mehta (yellow card) 39'; Boumous (yellow card) 45+14'; Rai 64' (o.g.)	Report	Ogbeche 18' (yellow card) 29'; Rai (yellow card) 45+13'; Siverio 90+1'	Stadium: PJN Stadium; Attendance: 0 Referee: Rahul Kumar Gupta; Man of the Match: Asish Rai (Hyderabad)

~~5 January 2022~~; 23 January 2022 10	ATK Mohun Bagan	0–0	Odisha	Fatorda, Goa
21:30 IST	Tangri (yellow card) 64'; Bose (yellow card) 79'	Report	T Singh (yellow card) 31'; Hernández (yellow card) 54'	Stadium: PJN Stadium; Attendance: 0 Referee: Harish Kundu; Man of the Match: Thoiba Singh (Odisha)
Note: The match was postponed due to a player testing COVID-19 positive on the matchday.

29 January 2022 11	ATK Mohun Bagan	3–1	East Bengal	Fatorda, Goa
IST	Williams (yellow card) 44'; Nassiri 64', 90+3', 90+5'; McHugh (yellow card) 79'	Report	Sidoel 56'; Mondal (yellow card) 60'	Stadium: PJN Stadium; Attendance: 0 Referee: Crystal John; Man of the Match: Kiyan Nassiri (ATK Mohun Bagan)

3 February 2022 12	Mumbai City	1–1	ATK Mohun Bagan	Fatorda, Goa
19:30 IST	Jahouh (yellow card) 19'; Kotal 24' (o.g.); Bheke (yellow card) 35'	Report	Williams 9'; Boumous (yellow card) 20'	Stadium: PJN Stadium; Attendance: 0 Referee: Rahul Kumar Gupta; Man of the Match: Tiri (ATK Mohun Bagan)

8 February 2022 13	Hyderabad	1–2	ATK Mohun Bagan	Bambolim, Goa
19:30 IST	Chianese 67'; Tavora (yellow card) 80'; Rai (yellow card) 81'	Report	Das (yellow card) 12'; Colaco 56'; M Singh 59'; Boumous (yellow card) 68'	Stadium: GMC Athletic Stadium; Attendance: 0 Referee: Harish Kundu; Man of the Match: Liston Colaco (ATK Mohun Bagan)

~~4 March 2022~~; 12 February 2022 14	ATK Mohun Bagan	3–1	NorthEast United	Fatorda, Goa
19:30 IST	Kauko 22'; Colaco 45'; M Singh 52'	Report	Suhair 17'; Kumar (yellow card) 44'; Santana (yellow card) 68'	Stadium: PJN Stadium; Attendance: 0 Referee: Ramachandran Venkatesh; Man of the Match: Joni Kauko (ATK Mohun Bagan)
Note: Match was rescheduled.

~~25 February 2022~~; 15 February 2022 15	Goa	0–2	ATK Mohun Bagan	Bambolim, Goa
19:30 IST	Martins (yellow card) 51'	Report	M Singh 3', 46'; Tangri (yellow card) 24'; Bose (yellow card) 87'	Stadium: GMC Athletic Stadium; Attendance: 0 Referee: Crystal John; Man of the Match: Manvir Singh (ATK Mohun Bagan)
Note: Match was rescheduled.

~~20 January 2022~~; 19 February 2022 16	Kerala Blasters	2–2	ATK Mohun Bagan	Vasco da Gama, Goa
19:30 IST	Luna 7', 64' (yellow card) 51'; Lešcović (yellow card) 35'; Khawlhring (yellow card) 56'; Díaz (yellow card) 84' (yellow-red card) 90+8'; S Singh (yellow card) 86'; Vàzquez (yellow card) 90+4'	Report	Williams 8'; Kauko (yellow card) 56' (goal) 90+7'; Das (red card) 90+2'	Stadium: Tilak Maidan; Attendance: 0 Referee: Rahul Kumar Gupta; Man of the Match: Adrián Luna (Kerala Blasters)
Note: The match was postponed due to numerous players and members of staff testing COVID-19 positive.

~~13 February 2022~~; 24 February 2022 17	Odisha	1–1	ATK Mohun Bagan	Vasco da Gama, Goa
19:30 IST	Tlang 5'; T Singh (yellow card) 44'; Thangmuansang (yellow card) 85'	Report	Kauko 8' (pen.); Jhingan (yellow card) 45'; Krishna (yellow card) 58' (yellow-red card) 90+3'; Mehta (yellow card) 78'; Tiri (yellow card) 90+5'	Stadium: Tilak Maidan; Attendance: 0 Referee: Aditya Purkyastha; Man of the Match: Sebastian Thangmuansang (Odisha)
Note: Match was rescheduled.

~~15 January 2022~~; 27 February 2022 18	ATK Mohun Bagan	2–0	Bengaluru	Fatorda, Goa
19:30 IST	Colaco 45+1'; M Singh 85'	Report	S Chhetri (yellow card) 50'; Yaya (yellow card) 71'; Augustine (yellow card) 75'	Stadium: PJN Stadium; Attendance: 0 Referee: Harish Kundu; Man of the Match: Sandesh Jhingan (ATK Mohun Bagan)
Note: The match was postponed due to numerous players and members of staff testing COVID-19 positive.

~~21 February 2022~~; 3 March 2022 19	Chennaiyin	0–1	ATK Mohun Bagan	Fatorda, Goa
19:30 IST		Report	Krishna 45+3'; Tangri (yellow card) 56'	Stadium: PJN Stadium; Attendance: 0 Referee: Crystal John; Man of the Match: Tiri (ATK Mohun Bagan)
Note: Match was rescheduled.

~~16 February 2022~~; 7 March 2022 20	ATK Mohun Bagan	0–1	Jamshedpur	Fatorda, Goa
19:30 IST	Tiri (yellow card) 90+6'	Report	Halder (yellow card) 10'; Chukwu (yellow card) 13'; Stewart (yellow card) 38'; R Das 57'; Laldinpuia (yellow card) 84'	Stadium: PJN Stadium; Attendance: 0 Referee: Crystal John; Man of the Match: Peter Hartley (Jamshedpur)
Note: Match was rescheduled.

=== ISL Playoffs ===
==== Matches ====
12 March 2022 Semi-final 1st leg	Hyderabad	3–1	ATK Mohun Bagan	Bambolim, Goa
19:30 IST	Ogbeche 45+2'; Yasir 58'; Siverio 64'	Report	Krishna 18'	Stadium: GMC Athletic Stadium; Attendance: 0 Referee: Rahul Kumar Gupta; Man of the Match: Bartholomew Ogbeche (Hyderabad)

16 March 2022 Semi-final 2nd leg	ATK Mohun Bagan	1–0 (2–3 agg.)	Hyderabad	Bambolim, Goa
19:30 IST	A Singh (yellow card) 58'; Krishna 79'	Report	Ogbeche (yellow card) 42'; Mishra (yellow card) 58'	Stadium: GMC Athletic Stadium; Attendance: 0 Referee: Ramachandran Venkatesh; Man of the Match: Laxmikant Kattimani (Hyderabad)

=== 2022 AFC Cup ===
==== Qualifying stage ====
===== Matches =====
12 April 2022 Preliminary round 2	ATK Mohun Bagan (India)	5–0	(Sri Lanka) Blue Star	Kolkata, India
19:30 UTC+5:30	Kauko 24', 39' (pen.); M Singh 29', 88'; Das (yellow card) 33'; Williams 76'; Rathi (yellow card) 84'	Report		Stadium: Salt Lake Stadium; Attendance: 25,948; Referee: (Malaysia) Razlan Joffri Ali; Man of the Match: Joni Kauko (ATK Mohun Bagan)

19 April 2022 Play-off round	ATK Mohun Bagan (India)	3–1	(Bangladesh) Abahani Ltd. Dhaka	Kolkata, India
19:00 UTC+5:30	Williams 6', 29', 85'; Boumous (yellow card) 43'; Tangri (yellow card) 45+1'	Report	Colindres (yellow card) 17' (goal) 60'; Soleimani (yellow card) 43'; Royal (yellow card) 90+1'	Stadium: Vivekananda Yuba Bharati Krirangan; Attendance: 31,925; Referee: (Iran) Seyed Vahid Kazemi; Man of the Match: David Williams (ATK Mohun Bagan)

==== Group stage ====
===== Group table =====
Pos	Team	Pld	W	D	L	GF	GA	GD	Pts	Qualification	MBSG	BSK	MAZ	GOK
1	(India) ATK Mohun Bagan (H)	3	2	0	1	11	6	+5	6 (Note: Head-to-head points: ATK Mohun Bagan 3, Bashundhara Kings 0.)	Inter-zone play-off semi-finals	—	4–0	—	—
2	(Bangladesh) Bashundhara Kings	3	2	0	1	3	5	−2	6		—	—	1–0	—
3	(Maldives) Maziya	3	1	0	2	3	6	−3	3 (Note: Head-to-head points: Maziya 3, Gokulam Kerala 0.)		2–5	—	—	1–0
4	(India) Gokulam Kerala	3	1	0	2	5	5	0	3		4–2	1–2	—	—

Source: AFC
Rules for classification: Tiebreakers
(H) Hosts

===== Matches =====
18 May 2022 1	Gokulam Kerala (India)	4–2	(India) ATK Mohun Bagan	Kolkata, India
16:30 UTC+4:30	Benny (yellow card) 24'; Majcen 50', 65'; Rishad 57'; Hakku (yellow card) 68'; Jithin 89'	Report	Tiri (yellow card) 37'; Pritam Kotal 53'; Prabir Das (yellow card) 70'; Colaco 80'	Stadium: Vivekananda Yuba Bharati Krirangan; Attendance: 31,790; Referee: (Iran) Seyed Vahid Kazemi; Man of the Match: Luka Majcen (Gokulam Kerala)

21 May 2022 2	ATK Mohun Bagan (India)	4–0	(Bangladesh) Bashundhara Kings	Kolkata, India
16:30 UTC+5:30	Colaco 24', 33', 53'; Williams 77'	Report	Shafiei (yellow card) 67'; Figuera (yellow card) 72'	Stadium: Vivekananda Yuba Bharati Krirangan; Attendance: 34,595; Referee: (Chinese Taipei) Chen Hsin-Chuan; Man of the Match: Liston Colaco (ATK Mohun Bagan)

24 May 2022 3	Maziya (Maldives)	2–5	(India) ATK Mohun Bagan	Kolkata, India
20:30 UTC+5:30	Tana 45', 73'	Report	Kauko 26', 37'; Tangri (yellow card) 30'; Krishna 56'; Bose 58'; McHugh 71'	Stadium: Vivekananda Yuba Bharati Krirangan; Attendance: 33,729; Referee: (Brunei) Abdul Hakim Haidi; Man of the Match: Joni Kauko (ATK Mohun Bagan)

== Friendlies ==
Date	Venue	Opponent	Results	Goalscorers	
Date	Venue	Opponent	Results	For	Against
5 May 2022	Kolkata, India	West Bengal	0–1	–	Tuhin Das
11 May 2022	Kolkata, India	India	2–1	Liston Colaco; Kiyan Nassiri	Sunil Chhetri

== Statistics ==
As of 24 May 2022

=== Appearances ===
Players with no appearances are not included in the list.

Appearances for Mohun Bagan in 2021–22 season
No.	Pos.	Nat.	Name	AFC Cup 2021		Indian Super League		ISL Playoffs		AFC Cup Qualifiers		AFC Cup 2022		Total	
No.	Pos.	Nat.	Name	Apps	Starts	Apps	Starts	Apps	Starts	Apps	Starts	Apps	Starts	Apps	Starts
Goalkeepers
1	GK	(India)	Amrinder Singh	4	4	20	20	2	2	1	1	1	1	28	28
28	GK	(India)	Subrata Paul	—								1	0	1	0
31	GK	(India)	Arsh Anwer	—						1	1	2	2	3	3
Defenders
2	CB	(India)	Sumit Rathi	2	2	1	1	—		1	0	1	0	5	3
3	CB	(India)	Gursimrat Singh Gill	—		2	0	—		1	0	1	0	4	0
4	CB	(India)	Tiri	—		16	16	1	1	2	2	1	1	20	20
5	CB	(India)	Sandesh Jhingan	—		7	6	2	2	—		2	2	11	10
6	RB	(India)	Ashutosh Mehta	3	2	16	10	1	0	1	0	1	0	22	12
13	RB	(India)	Ravi Rana	—		1	0	—		1	0	2	0	4	0
15	LB	(India)	Subhasish Bose	4	4	20	19	2	2	2	2	3	3	31	30
20	CB	(India)	Pritam Kotal	4	4	20	20	2	2	2	2	3	3	31	31
33	RB	(India)	Prabir Das	—		17	5	2	1	2	2	3	3	24	11
Midfielders
7	CM	(Finland)	Joni Kauko	1	1	18	13	2	2	2	2	3	3	26	21
8	CDM	(Republic of Ireland)	Carl McHugh	4	4	16	16	2	1	—		2	2	24	23
10	AM	(France)	Hugo Boumous	2	1	15	14	2	1	2	2	—		21	18
16	CDM	(India)	Abhishek Suryavanshi	2	0	2	0	—		1	0	1	0	6	0
18	CM	(India)	Engson Singh	1	0	—				1	0	—		2	0
19	CM	(India)	Bidyananda Singh	2	0	3	0	—		2	0	—		7	0
22	CDM	(India)	Deepak Tangri	3	3	17	14	1	1	2	2	2	2	25	22
23	LW/CM	(India)	Michael Soosairaj	1	0	5	0	—						6	0
24	CDM	(India)	Lenny Rodrigues	4	4	18	10	1	1	—		2	1	25	16
27	CM	(India)	SK Sahil	4	1	—				1	0	—		5	1
Forwards
9	ST	(Australia)	David Williams	4	4	15	6	2	1	2	2	3	1	26	14
11	RW	(India)	Manvir Singh	4	4	20	20	2	0	2	2	3	3	31	29
17	LW	(India)	Liston Colaco	4	2	20	19	2	1	1	1	3	3	30	26
21	ST	(Fiji)	Roy Krishna	4	4	14	11	2	2	—		3	3	23	20
25	SS/RW	(India)	Kiyan Nassiri	1	0	11	0	2	1	2	1	1	0	17	2
99	CF	(India)	Fardin Ali Molla	—								1	0	1	0

=== Goalscorers ===
Rank	No.	Nat.	Name	AFC Cup 2021	Indian Super League	ISL Playoffs	AFC Cup Qualifiers	AFC Cup 2022	Total
1	17	(India)	Liston Colaco	1	8	0	0	4	13
2	9	(Australia)	David Williams	1	4	0	4	1	10
2	21	(Fiji)	Roy Krishna	2	5	2	0	1	10
3	11	(India)	Manvir Singh	1	6	0	2	0	9
4	7	(Finland)	Joni Kauko	0	3	0	2	2	7
5	10	(France)	Hugo Boumous	0	5	0	0	0	5
6	15	(India)	Subhasish Bose	1	1	0	0	1	3
6	25	(India)	Kiyan Nassiri	0	3	0	0	0	3
7	20	(India)	Pritam Kotal	0	1	0	0	1	2
8	8	(Republic of Ireland)	Carl McHugh	0	0	0	0	1	1
Own Goal(s)				0	1	0	0	0	1
Total				6	37	2	8	11	64

=== Assists ===
Rank	No.	Nat.	Name	AFC Cup 2021	Indian Super League	ISL Playoffs	AFC Cup Qualifiers	AFC Cup 2022	Total
1	7	(Finland)	Joni Kauko	0	6	0	1	1	8
1	10	(France)	Hugo Boumous	1	5	0	2	0	8
1	17	(India)	Liston Colaco	1	3	2	0	2	8
2	21	(Fiji)	Roy Krishna	0	4	0	0	1	5
3	11	(India)	Manvir Singh	0	1	0	1	2	4
3	15	(India)	Subhasish Bose	1	1	0	0	2	4
4	6	(India)	Ashutosh Mehta	1	1	0	0	0	2
4	9	(Australia)	David Williams	1	1	0	0	0	2
4	20	(India)	Pritam Kotal	0	2	0	0	0	2
4	22	(India)	Deepak Tangri	0	1	0	1	0	2
5	24	(India)	Lenny Rodrigues	0	1	0	0	0	1
5	33	(India)	Prabir Das	0	0	0	1	0	1

=== Cleansheets ===
Rank	No.	Nat.	Name	AFC Cup 2021	Indian Super League	ISL Playoffs	AFC Cup Qualifiers	AFC Cup 2022	Total
1	1	(India)	Amrinder Singh	0	5	1	0	1	7
2	31	(India)	Arsh Anwer Shaikh	0	0	0	1	1	2
3	28	(India)	Subrata Pal	0	0	0	0	1	1
