= 2016 FC Pune City season =

3rd season in existence of FC Pune City

Pune City
2016 season
- Head Coach: Antonio López Habas
- Stadium: Balewadi Sports Complex

The 2016 FC Pune City season will be the club's third season since its establishment in 2014 and their third season in the Indian Super League. This season will also be the first in which the club is coached by Spaniard Antonio López Habas, replacing David Platt who served as head coach the previous season.

== Background ==
After the end of the 2014 ISL season, FC Pune City parted ways with their inaugural season head coach, Franco Colomba. Soon after, David Platt, was named as the new head coach for the 2015 season. The season began for Pune City with a 3–1 victory to the Mumbai City on 5 October. The team ended the season with four wins through fourteen matches and failed to qualify for the finals but were seven points short.

== Player movement ==
=== Retained players ===
==== Domestic ====
Position	Player
GK	(India) Arindam Bhattacharya
DF	(India) Gouramangi Singh
DF	(India) Dharmaraj Ravanan
MF	(India) Lenny Rodrigues
MF	(India) Eugeneson Lyngdoh

=== Signings ===
Position	Player	Old club	Date	Ref
GK	(India) Vishal Kaith	(India) Shillong Lajong	10 May 2016	
DF	(India) Zodingliana Ralte	(India) Delhi Dynamos	10 May 2016	
DF	(India) Rahul Bheke	(India) East Bengal	15 June 2016	
MF	(Spain) Pitu	(Spain) Llagostera	21 June 2016	

== Indian Super League ==
Pos	Team	Pld	W	D	L	GF	GA	GD	Pts	Qualification
4	Atlético de Kolkata (C)	14	4	8	2	16	14	+2	20	Advance to ISL Play-offs
5	NorthEast United	14	5	3	6	14	14	0	18	
6	Pune City	14	4	4	6	13	16	−3	16	
7	Chennaiyin	14	3	6	5	20	25	−5	15	
8	Goa	14	4	2	8	15	25	−10	14	

Source: Indian Super League
Rules for classification: 1) points; 2) head-to-head points; 3) head-to-head goal difference; 4) goal difference; 5) number of goals scored; 6) play-off match
(C) Champions

=== Results summary ===
Overall								Home						Away					
Pld	W	D	L	GF	GA	GD	Pts	W	D	L	GF	GA	GD	W	D	L	GF	GA	GD
0	0	0	0	0	0	0	0	0	0	0	0	0	0	0	0	0	0	0	0

Last updated: October 2016.
Source: Matches

=== Matches ===
Win Draw Loss

3 October 2016 1	Pune City	0–1	Mumbai City	Pune, Maharashtra
19:00 IST (UTC+5:30)		Report	Defederico 68'	Stadium: Shree Shiv Chhatrapati Sports Complex; Attendance: 8,189; Referee: Ali Abdulnabi

8 October 2016 2	Goa	1–2	Pune City	Margao, Goa
19:00 IST (UTC+5:30)	Coelho 33'	Report	Izumi 25'; Ndoye 90'	Stadium: Fatorda Stadium; Attendance: 19,003; Referee: Bhaskaran Santosh Kumar

12 October 2016 3	Pune City	0–1	NorthEast United	Pune, Maharashtra
19:00 IST (UTC+5:30)		Report	Alfaro 79'	Stadium: Shree Shiv Chhatrapati Sports Complex; Attendance: 7,911; Referee: Fernando Guerrero Ramírez

17 October 2016 4	Pune City	1–1	Kerala Blasters	Pune, Maharashtra
19:00 IST (UTC+5:30)	Sissoko 68'	Report	Hengbart 3'	Stadium: Shree Shiv Chhatrapati Sports Complex; Attendance: 8,556; Referee: Ajit Meetei

23 October 2016 5	Pune City	1–1	Chennaiyin	Pune, Maharashtra
19:00 IST (UTC+5:30)	Zurdo 82'	Report	Lalpekhlua 28'	Stadium: Shree Shiv Chhatrapati Sports Complex; Attendance: 9,013; Referee: Tejas Nagvenkar

27 October 2016 6	Delhi Dynamos	1–1	Pune City	Delhi
19:00 IST (UTC+5:30)	Singh 79'	Report	Tato 45+2'	Stadium: Jawaharlal Nehru Stadium, Delhi; Attendance: 13,275; Referee: Hettikamkanamge Perera

3 November 2016 7	Pune City	0–1	Goa	Pune, Maharashtra
19:00 IST (UTC+5:30)		Report	Coelho 32'	Stadium: Shree Shiv Chhatrapati Sports Complex; Attendance: 8,587; Referee: Ajit Dutta

2016 8	v
19:00 IST (UTC+5:30)

2016 9	v
19:00 IST (UTC+5:30)

2016 10	v
19:00 IST (UTC+5:30)

2016 11	v
19:00 IST (UTC+5:30)

2016 12	v
19:00 IST (UTC+5:30)

2016 13	v
19:00 IST (UTC+5:30)

2016 14	v
19:00 IST (UTC+5:30)

== Player statistics ==
Season stats
#	Position	Player	GP	G
	GK	(India) Arindam Bhattacharya	0	0
	GK	(India) Vishal Kaith	0	0
	DF	(India) Dharmaraj Ravanan	0	0
	DF	(India) Gouramangi Singh	0	0
	DF	(India) Zodingliana Ralte	0	0
	DF	(India) Rahul Bheke	0	0
	MF	(India) Eugeneson Lyngdoh	0	0
	MF	(India) Lenny Rodrigues	0	0
	MF	(Spain) Pitu	0	0

== See also ==
- 2016–17 in Indian football
