= Massimo Battara =

Italian footballer and coach

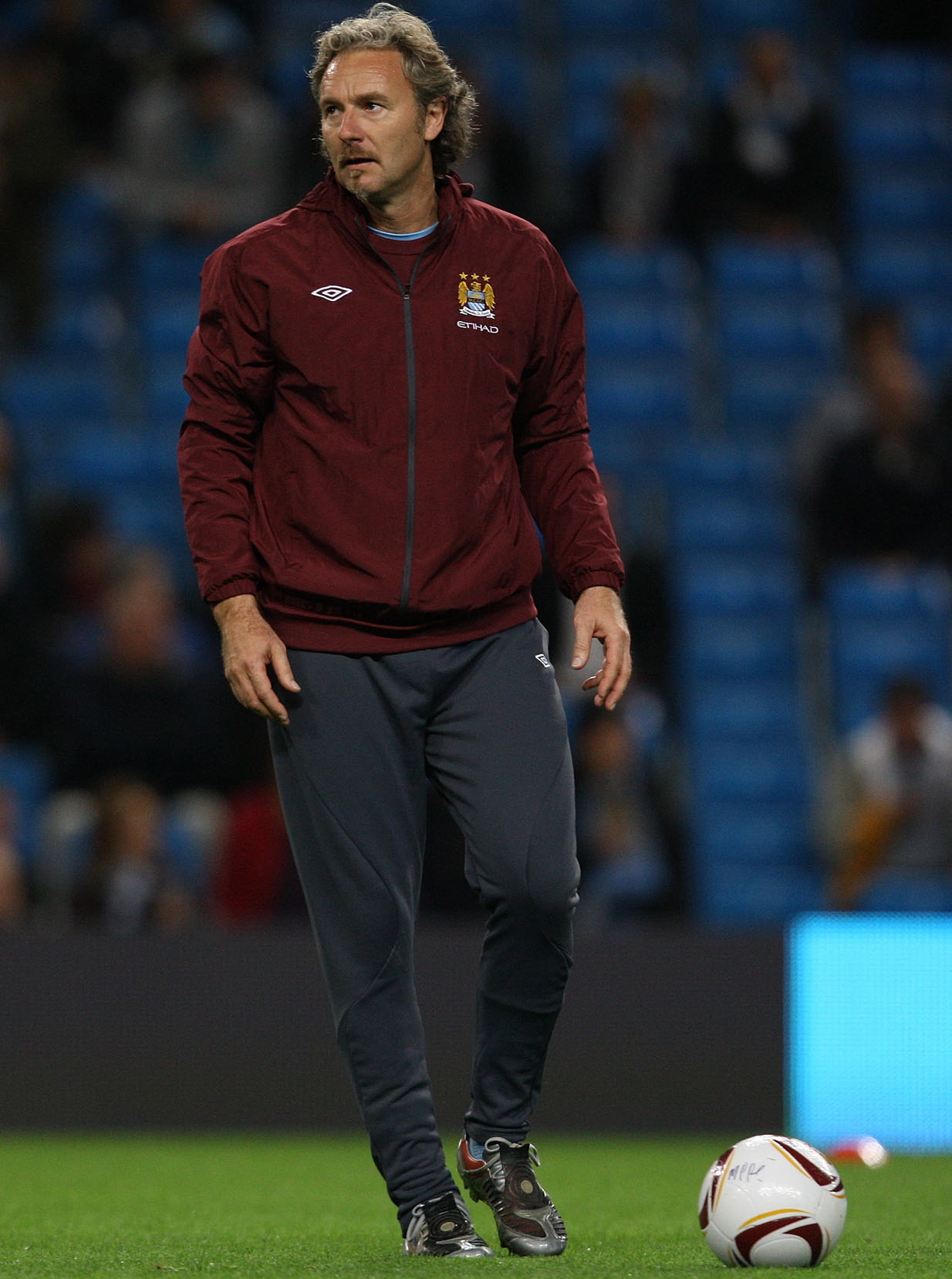
- Massimo Battara in 2011

Personal information
- Full name: Massimo Battara
- Date of birth: 3 May 1963 (age 63)
- Place of birth: Genoa, Italy
- Height: 1.92 m (6 ft 4 in)
- Position: Goalkeeper

Team information
- Current team: Saudi Arabia (Goalkeeping Coach)

Senior career*
| Years | Team | Apps | (Gls) |
| 1981–1982 | Bologna | | |
| 1982–1983 | Viadanese | | |
| 1983–1984 | Sampdoria | 0 | (0) |
| 1984–1985 | Sambenedettese | | |
| 1985–1996 | Puteolana Internapoli | | |
| 1986–1989 | Casertana | | |
| 1989–1991 | Salernitana | | |
| 1991–1992 | US Lecce | 29 | (0) |
| 1992–1993 | SPAL | 29 | (0) |
| 1994–1995 | Sassuolo | | |

Managerial career
- 1998–2000: Ittihad Jeddah FC (Goalkeeping Coach)
- 2001: Napoli (Goalkeeping Coach)
- 2001–2002: Fiorentina (Goalkeeping Coach)
- 2004–2008: Internazionale (Goalkeeping Coach)
- 2008–2009: Benevento (Goalkeeping Coach)
- 2009–2013: Manchester City (Goalkeeping Coach)
- 2014–2015: Schalke 04 (Goalkeeping Coach)
- 2015–2016: FC Pune City (Goalkeeping Coach)
- 2016: Aston Villa (Goalkeeping Coach)
- 2017–2018: Zenit St. Petersburg (Goalkeeping Coach)
- 2018–2023: Italy (Goalkeeping Coach)
- 2023–: Saudi Arabia (Goalkeeping Coach)
- * Club domestic league appearances and goals

Massimo Battara (born 3 May 1963) is an Italian football coach and a former player, who played as a goalkeeper. He currently works as a goalkeeping coach with the Saudi Arabia national football team. He has worked with Roberto Di Matteo both at Aston Villa and at FC Schalke 04. Between 2009 until his resignation in May 2013, he was the goalkeeping coach at Manchester City.

== Career ==
Battara has also worked at Inter Milan and with ex Manchester City manager Roberto Mancini, and joined City in December 2009 as part of Mancini's new coaching team.

He worked under David Platt in India at FC Pune City before joining Roberto Di Matteo at Aston Villa in 2016.

== Honours ==
Manchester City

- FA Cup: 2010–11 (as goalkeeping coach)
