= 1997–98 Serie C1 =

The Serie C1 1997-1998 was the twentieth edition of the rebranded major competition of the present-day Serie C.

== Group A (North) ==
		North	Pt	G	V	N	P	GF	GS
15px	1.	Cesena	67	34	18	13	3	49	22
15px	2.	Cremonese	59	34	16	11	7	41	31
	3.	Livorno	58	34	19	5	10	48	34
	4.	Alzano Virescit	58	34	15	13	6	45	29
	5.	Lumezzane	55	34	15	10	9	43	31
	6.	Modena	49	34	14	7	13	40	37
	7.	Calcio Lecco	43	34	10	13	11	31	35
	8.	Siena	41	34	9	14	11	34	41
	9.	Brescello	39	34	9	12	13	42	43
	10.	Calcio Como	39	34	9	12	13	30	38
	11.	Carpi	39	34	9	12	13	29	43
	12.	Calcio Saronno	38	34	6	20	8	29	28
	13.	Montevarchi	38	34	8	14	12	29	34
	14.	Pistoiese	37	34	8	13	13	21	27
15px	15.	Prato	36	34	8	12	14	24	38
	16.	Carrarese	36	34	8	12	14	27	39
15px	17.	Alessandria	36	34	6	18	10	29	35
15px	18.	Fiorenzuola	34	34	7	13	14	29	35

=== Play-off ===
Semifinals

	Risultati		Luogo e data
Lumezzane	1 - 2	Cremonese	Lumezzane, 31 maggio 1998
Cremonese	0 - 1	Lumezzane	Cremona, 7 giugno 1998
Alzano Virescit	0 - 0	Livorno	Alzano, 31 maggio 1998
Livorno	3 - 2	Alzano Virescit	Livorno, 7 giugno 1998

Final

	Risultati		Luogo e data
Cremonese	1 - 0 dts	Livorno	Perugia, 14 giugno 1998

=== Play-out ===
	Risultati		Luogo e data
Carrarese	2 - 0	Prato	Carrara, 31 maggio 1998
Prato	0 - 1	Carrarese	Prato, 8 giugno 1998
Alessandria	1 - 1	Pistoiese	Alessandria, 31 maggio 1998
Pistoiese	2 - 1	Alessandria	Pistoia, 8 giugno 1997

== Group B (South) ==
		South	Pt	G	V	N	P	GF	GS
15px	1.	Cosenza	68	34	19	11	4	45	21
15px	2.	Ternana	65	34	16	17	1	38	15
	3.	Gualdo	54	34	12	15	7	33	26
	4.	Nocerina	51	34	15	9	10	29	24
	5.	Atletico Catania	48	34	12	12	10	31	25
	6.	Juve Stabia	47	34	9	20	5	28	24
	7.	Avellino	46	34	12	10	12	36	37
	8.	Acireale	45	34	10	15	9	21	18
	9.	Savoia	44	34	10	14	10	27	27
	10.	Ascoli	41	34	8	17	9	32	38
	11.	Giulianova	41	34	11	8	15	40	38
15px	12.	Ischia	41	34	9	14	11	27	32
	13.	Fermana	41	34	11	8	15	35	47
	14.	Palermo	37	34	8	12	14	32	37
	15.	Lodigiani	36	34	5	18	11	25	35
15px	16.	Turris	33	34	8	13	13	22	32
	17.	Battipagliese	33	34	7	12	15	25	37
15px	18.	Casarano	30	34	7	9	18	27	50

=== Play-off ===
Semifinals

	Risultati		Luogo e data
Atletico Catania	0 - 0	Ternana	Catania, 31 maggio 1998
Ternana	1 - 0	Atletico Catania	Terni, 7 giugno 1998
Nocerina	2 - 0	Gualdo	Nocera Inferiore, 31 maggio 1998
Gualdo	3 - 2	Nocerina	Gualdo Tadino, 7 giugno 1998

Final

	Risultati		Luogo e data
Ternana	1 - 0 dts	Nocerina	Ancona, 14 giugno 1998

=== Play-out ===
	Risultati		Luogo e data
Battipagliese	1 - 0	Palermo	Battipaglia, 31 maggio 1998
Palermo	0 - 0	Battipagliese	Palermo, 7 giugno 1998
Turris	1 - 2	Lodigiani	Torre del Greco, 31 maggio 1998
Lodigiani	1 - 0	Turris	Roma, 7 giugno 1998

== References and sources ==
- Almanacco Illustrato del Calcio - La Storia 1898-2004, Panini Edizioni, Modena, September 2005

Specific
