= Gurjinder Kumar =

Indian footballer

Personal information
- Date of birth: 10 October 1990 (age 36)
- Place of birth: Nawanshahr, Punjab, India
- Height: 1.78 m (5 ft 10 in)
- Position: Left back

Team information
- Current team: Malappuram FC
- Number: 3

Youth career
- 2001–2007: Chandigarh FA
- 2007–2010: Tata FA

Senior career*
Years	Team	Apps	(Gls)
2010–2014	Pune	84	(5)
2014–2016	Salgaocar	29	(1)
2015	→ Pune City (loan)	4	(0)
2017	Minerva Punjab	3	(0)
2017–2020	Mohun Bagan	24	(0)
2020–2023	NorthEast United	45	(0)
2024-	Malappuram FC	1	(0)

International career
2011	India U23	2	(0)
2012–2013	India	5	(0)
- * Club domestic league appearances and goals as of 19:28, 4 February 2023 (UTC)

Gurjinder Kumar (Punjabi: ਗੁਰਜਿੰਦਰ ਕੁਮਾਰ; born 10 October 1990) is an Indian professional footballer who plays as a defender for Super League Kerala club Malappuram FC.

== Club career ==
=== Early career ===
Born in Nawanshahr, Punjab, Gurjinder was born into a family of footballers. At the age of 10, after his older brother died, he started to take football seriously and joined the Chandigarh Football Academy. After spending seven years there Kumar moved to the famed Tata Football Academy where he joined the academy senior side.

=== Pune ===
In 2010, Gurjinder signed his first professional contract with Pune of the I-League. He scored his first professional goal during his first season at the club on 26 February 2011 against Viva Kerala in which his 11th-minute goal put Pune into an early 2–0 lead. The club eventually managed to get into a 4–0 lead but then gave up four goals to draw the match 4–4. After the 2010–11 season, he was named the Pune's best under-23 player at the club's annual awards ceremony. Gurjinder was part of the team that played against the then Premier League side Blackburn Rovers on 7 October 2011, in a game that Blackburn won 3-0 He then scored his second career goal the next season against Viva Kerala again, in a match Pune managed to win 3–1. Kumar then went on to score his third goal of his career, and his second that season, only a month later on 21 December 2011 against Churchill Brothers in which his 84th-minute strike helped Pune finish the match 2–0 winners. His fourth goal of his career, and last for the season, came on 18 January 2012 against Mumbai in which he found the net in the 90th minute to finish a 3–0 victory for Pune. Then after the 2011–12 season, he was given the "Goal of the Year" award for his strike against Chirag United Kerala. He won the Ashok Piramal Group "Young Player of the Year" award for 2012–13 season.

Gurjinder did not score again until the 2013–14 season when his goal against Rangdajied United on 11 December 2013 to give Pune a 2–0 lead which they would eventually give up and lose 3–2.

=== Salgaocar ===
Gurjinder Kumar signed for Salgaocar for the 2014-15 I-League and made his debut in the 2014-15 Indian Federation Cup, scoring 3 times in the group stages.

=== FC Pune City ===
In July 2015 Kumar was drafted to play for FC Pune City in the 2015 Indian Super League.

=== NorthEast United ===
In 2020 Kumar was signed by NorthEast United on a 2 years deal.

== International ==
In June 2011 Kumar made his international debut for India at the under-23 level against Qatar U23 side for the 2012 Olympic qualifiers. Then on 1 February 2012 Kumar was called up to the senior India side for a preparation camp for the upcoming 2012 AFC Challenge Cup. He then made his senior international debut for India on 27 February 2012 against Azerbaijan in a friendly in which he started and played the full 90 minutes as India lost 0–3.

== Career statistics ==
=== Club ===
As of 19 April 2023

Club	Season	League			Cup		AFC		Total	
Club	Season	Division	Apps	Goals	Apps	Goals	Apps	Goals	Apps	Goals
Pune	2010–11	I-League	22	1	4 (Note: Appearance(s) in Super Cup) (Note: Appearance(s) in Durand Cup)	0	—		26	1
Pune	2011–12	I-League	21	3	3	0	—		24	3
Pune	2012–13	I-League	23	0	5	0	—		28	0
Pune	2013–14	I-League	18	1	3	0	7 (Note: Appearance(s) in AFC Champions League) (Note: Appearance(s) in AFC Cup)	0	28	1
Pune	Total		84	5	15	0	7	0	106	5
Salgaocar	2014–15	I-League	18	0	9	3	—		27	3
Pune City (loan)	2015	Indian Super League	4	0	0	0	—		4	0
Salgaocar	2015–16	I-League	11	1	0	0	—		11	1
Minerva Punjab	2016–17	I-League	3	0	0	0	—		3	0
Mohun Bagan	2017–18	I-League	5	0	3	0	—		8	0
Mohun Bagan	2018–19	I-League	11	0	0	0	—		11	0
Mohun Bagan	2019–20	I-League	8	0	4	0	—		12	0
Mohun Bagan	Total		24	0	7	0	0	0	31	0
NorthEast United	2020–21	Indian Super League	18	0	—		—		18	0
NorthEast United	2021–21	Indian Super League	16	0	—		—		16	0
NorthEast United	2022–23	Indian Super League	11	0	2	0	—		13	0
NorthEast United	Total		45	0	2	0	0	0	47	0
Career total			189	6	33	3	7	0	229	9

=== International stats ===
As of 24 December 2013

India national team
Year	Apps	Goals
2012	1	0
2013	4	0
Total	5	0

== Honours ==
=== Individual ===
- Pune's Best U-23 Player of the Year: 2010–11
- Pune F.C. Goal of the Year: 2011–12
- Ashok Piramal Group Young Player of the Year: 2012–13

=== Club ===
Mohun Bagan

- Calcutta Football League (1): 2018–19
