= Iván Bolado =

Equatoguinean footballer (born 1989)

Personal information
- Full name: Iván Bolado Palacios
- Date of birth: 3 July 1989 (age 37)
- Place of birth: Santander, Spain
- Height: 1.80 m (5 ft 11 in)
- Position: Striker

Youth career
- Racing Santander

Senior career*
Years	Team	Apps	(Gls)
2007–2008	Racing B		
2007–2011	Racing Santander	44	(6)
2008–2009	→ Elche (loan)	22	(2)
2011–2012	Cartagena	10	(2)
2012	CSKA Sofia	1	(0)
2014	Avilés	3	(0)
2014	Pune City	7	(0)
2016–2017	Rayo Cantabria	11	(4)
2017	Don Benito	13	(2)
2017–2018	Rayo Cantabria	0	(0)
Total		112	(16)

International career^{‡}
2008	Spain U19	5	(3)
2009	Spain U20	3	(1)
2009	Spain U21	1	(1)
2012–2017	Equatorial Guinea	14	(1)
- * Club domestic league appearances and goals ‡ National team caps and goals as of 9 June 2017

Iván Bolado Palacios (born 3 July 1989) is a former professional footballer who played as a striker. Born in Spain, he played for his country of birth and Equatorial Guinea at youth and senior levels, respectively.

== Club career ==
Born in Santander, Cantabria, Bolado made his professional debut with hometown club Racing de Santander's first team in 2007–08 and scored three league goals during the season, one of them in the dying minutes of the final matchday as the team defeated CA Osasuna 1–0 at home to secure a first-ever qualification to the UEFA Cup. His La Liga debut came on 26 August 2007, in a 0–0 home draw against FC Barcelona.

In August 2008, Bolado was loaned for a season to second division club Elche CF, with a clause which permitted his return to Racing in the January transfer window if requested. He returned to the Cantabrians in June 2009, going on to spend the vast majority of the 2009–10 campaign in the sidelines, with a severe knee injury he sustained in pre-season.

In one of his first games upon his return to action, Bolado netted twice – once through a bicycle kick – but Racing lost 3–4 at Athletic Bilbao on 29 March 2010. In 2010–11, barred by the likes of Ariel Nahuelpán and Markus Rosenberg (and Giovani dos Santos from January 2011 onwards), he could only appear in 19 games (seven starts, 728 minutes of action, one goal, again against the Basques and in another away defeat (1–2)).

In February 2012, after starting off with FC Cartagena in the second level, Bolado moved to Bulgaria and signed with PFC CSKA Sofia. In only his first match, a 0–2 away defeat against PSFC Chernomorets Burgas, he tore the ligaments in his knee and missed the rest of the season.

Bolado had fully recovered from his injury by mid-September 2012. In March 2014 he returned to his country of birth, joining Real Avilés from Segunda División B.

In the summer of 2014, Bolado joined FC Pune City in the newly formed Indian Super League.

== International career ==
Born to a mixed-race Equatoguinean father of Cantabrian and Fang descent, Bolado was called by the Equatorial Guinea team for the 2012 Africa Cup of Nations tournament. He made his debut on 6 January 2012, in a friendly with South Africa.

== Career statistics ==
As of 29 January 2017

Appearances and goals by club, season and competition
Club	Season	League			Cup		Other		Total	
Club	Season	Division	Apps	Goals	Apps	Goals	Apps	Goals	Apps	Goals
Racing Santander	2007–08	La Liga	14	3	7	1	—		21	4
Racing Santander	2009–10	La Liga	12	2	0	0	—		12	2
Racing Santander	2010–11	La Liga	19	1	2	1	—		21	2
Racing Santander	Total		45	6	9	2	—		54	8
Elche (loan)	2008–09	Segunda División	22	2	1	0	—		23	2
Cartagena	2011–12	Segunda División	10	2	1	0	—		11	2
CSKA Sofia	2011–12	A PFG	1	0	0	0	—		1	0
Avilés	2013–14	Segunda División B	3	0	0	0	—		3	0
Pune City	2014	Indian Super League	7	0	—		—		7	0
Rayo Cantabria	2016–17	Tercera División	11	4	0	0	—		11	4
Career total			99	14	11	2	0	0	110	16

== Honours ==
Spain U20

- Mediterranean Games: 2009
