= Emanuele Belardi =

Italian footballer (born 1977)

Personal information
- Date of birth: 9 October 1977 (age 49)
- Place of birth: Eboli, Italy
- Height: 1.87 m (6 ft 2 in)
- Position: Goalkeeper

Youth career
- Reggina

Senior career*
| Years | Team | Apps | (Gls) |
| 1995–2006 | Reggina | 103 | (0) |
| 1997–1998 | → Turris (loan) | 18 | (0) |
| 2004–2005 | → Napoli (loan) | 16 | (0) |
| 2005 | → Modena (loan) | 0 | (0) |
| 2005–2006 | → Catanzaro (loan) | 35 | (0) |
| 2006–2008 | Juventus | 5 | (0) |
| 2008–2012 | Udinese | 7 | (0) |
| 2012 | Reggina | 9 | (0) |
| 2012–2013 | Cesena | 15 | (0) |
| 2013 | Grosseto | 0 | (0) |
| 2013–2014 | Pescara | 21 | (0) |
| 2014 | Pune City | 4 | (0) |
| 2015–2016 | Reggina | 11 | (0) |
| Total | | 244 | (0) |
- * Club domestic league appearances and goals

Emanuele Belardi (born 9 October 1977) is a retired Italian footballer who was a goalkeeper.

== Club career ==
=== Reggina ===
Belardi started his career as a youth member at Reggina Calcio, before he was promoted to the club's first team in 1995. After two seasons with both first team and reserve, Belardi was loaned out to Turris for the 1997–98 Serie C1 season. With Turris, the keeper managed to make 18 appearances, before returning to Calabria in the summer of 1998, following the expiration of his loan deal. He would remain at Reggina, for the next 6 seasons, totalling 103 league appearances for the club, before being loaned out to another Serie C1 club Napoli Soccer, in 2004. He made 16 starts for the club that season. In January 2005 he moved to Modena F.C. of Serie B to play as a backup keeper. Following his return to Reggio Calabria on 1 July 2005, he was again loaned out. This time, Belardi moved to Serie B club, F.C. Catanzaro. He was the starting keeper for the club, and made 36 appearances during the season.

=== Juventus ===
Belardi was jointed newly relegated Juventus FC in summer 2006 on free transfer (relegated due to 2006 Italian football scandal), to serve as a third choice goalkeeper behind Gianluigi Buffon, and Antonio Mirante. He signed a contract until 30 June 2009. Despite failing to make a single appearance during the entire 2006–07 Serie B season, Belardi became the second choice keeper to Italian International, Buffon, after Mirante was loaned out to U.C. Sampdoria. He made 5 league appearances, along with a select number of Coppa Italia matches for Juve during an injury spell to Buffon between December 2007 and January 2008. However, during the 2008/2009 Summer Transfer Market, it was realized that Juventus were in search of a new back-up goalkeeper, as the club felt that Belardi was shaky in goal when given the opportunity, while both Jess Vanstrattan and Cristiano Novembre were deemed too inexperienced. Veteran keeper Antonio Chimenti was brought back to the Turin-based club, on loan from Udinese Calcio in July 2008. In return, Belardi was sent to Udinese, in exchange, also on a loan deal. On 5 August 2008, Juventus purchased Alexander Manninger, who will replace Belardi as Buffon's back-up, while Chimenti will become third choice, replacing Vanstrattan, who was sent back to Hellas Verona F.C. and eventually sold to Gold Coast United of the Australian League. Novembre also was released as a free agent. Therefore, 3 of 4 goalkeepers were replaced at Juventus following the 2007–08 Serie A season, only excluding Buffon.

=== Udinese ===
In January 2009 the swap deal of Belardi to Udinese and Antonio Chimenti to Juventus became permanent. After his transfer to Udinese, Belardi had served as a back-up goalkeeper to Samir Handanovic, and had made select appearances for the northern club. Uniquely for a goalkeeper he wore the number 6 for his squad number. On 26 November 2011, his contract was terminated and he became a free agent.

=== Reggina, Cesena, Grosseto ===
Again, in 2012, he returns to Reggio Calabria to play with Reggina that challenges in Serie B. In July 2012 he moved to newly relegated Serie B team A.C. Cesena in 1-year deal. On 28 December 2012 he terminated his contract with Cesena and on 31 January 2013 signed by U.S. Grosseto F.C..

== Career statistics ==
=== Club ===
Appearances and goals by club, season and competition
| Club | Season | League | | | National cup | | Europe | | Other | | Total | |
| Club | Season | Division | Apps | Goals | Apps | Goals | Apps | Goals | Apps | Goals | Apps | Goals |
|---|---|---|---|---|---|---|---|---|---|---|---|---|
| Reggina | 1995–96 | Serie B | 1 | 0 | 0 | 0 | — | | — | | 1 | 0 |
| Reggina | 1996–97 | Serie B | 4 | 0 | 0 | 0 | — | | — | | 4 | 0 |
| Reggina | 1998–99 | Serie B | 5 | 0 | 4 | 0 | — | | — | | 9 | 0 |
| Reggina | 1999–2000 | Serie A | 4 | 0 | 4 | 0 | — | | — | | 8 | 0 |
| Reggina | 2000–01 | Serie A | 1 | 0 | 1 | 0 | — | | 0 | 0 | 2 | 0 |
| Reggina | 2001–02 | Serie B | 38 | 0 | 2 | 0 | — | | — | | 40 | 0 |
| Reggina | 2002–03 | Serie A | 20 | 0 | 4 | 0 | — | | 2 | 0 | 26 | 0 |
| Reggina | 2003–04 | Serie A | 30 | 0 | 3 | 0 | — | | — | | 33 | 0 |
| Reggina | Total | | 103 | 0 | 18 | 0 | — | | 2 | 0 | 123 | 0 |
| Turris (loan) | 1997–98 | Serie C1 | 18 | 0 | — | | — | | — | | 18 | 0 |
| Napoli (loan) | 2004–05 | Serie C1 | 16 | 0 | — | | — | | — | | 16 | 0 |
| Modena (loan) | 2004–05 | Serie B | 0 | 0 | — | | — | | — | | 0 | 0 |
| Catanzaro (loan) | 2005–06 | Serie B | 35 | 0 | 1 | 0 | — | | — | | 36 | 0 |
| Juventus | 2006–07 | Serie B | 0 | 0 | 0 | 0 | — | | — | | 0 | 0 |
| Juventus | 2007–08 | Serie A | 5 | 0 | 4 | 0 | — | | — | | 9 | 0 |
| Juventus | Total | | 5 | 0 | 4 | 0 | — | | — | | 9 | 0 |
| Udinese | 2008–09 | Serie A | 4 | 0 | 1 | 0 | 2 | 0 | — | | 7 | 0 |
| Udinese | 2009–10 | Serie A | 0 | 0 | 1 | 0 | — | | — | | 1 | 0 |
| Udinese | 2010–11 | Serie A | 3 | 0 | 3 | 0 | — | | — | | 6 | 0 |
| Udinese | 2011–12 | Serie A | 0 | 0 | — | | 0 | 0 | — | | 0 | 0 |
| Udinese | Total | | 7 | 0 | 5 | 0 | 2 | 0 | — | | 14 | 0 |
| Reggina | 2011–12 | Serie B | 9 | 0 | — | | — | | — | | 9 | 0 |
| Cesena | 2012–13 | Serie B | 15 | 0 | 1 | 0 | — | | — | | 16 | 0 |
| Grosseto | 2012–13 | Serie B | 0 | 0 | — | | — | | — | | 0 | 0 |
| Pescara | 2013–14 | Serie B | 21 | 0 | 0 | 0 | — | | — | | 21 | 0 |
| Pune City | 2014 | Indian Super League | 4 | 0 | — | | — | | — | | 4 | 0 |
| Reggina | 2014–15 | Lega Pro | 11 | 0 | — | | — | | 2 | 0 | 13 | 0 |
| Career total | | | 244 | 0 | 29 | 0 | 2 | 0 | 4 | 0 | 544 | 81 |
