= Israil Gurung =

Indian footballer

Personal information
- Date of birth: 2 April 1989 (age 37)
- Place of birth: Jaigaon, West Bengal, India
- Height: 1.72 m (5 ft 7 1/2 in)
- Position: Forward

Team information
- Current team: Goa (assistant)

Youth career
- Sports Authority of India
- East Bengal

Senior career*
Years	Team	Apps	(Gls)
2007–2008	Hindustan FC		
2008–2009	Sporting Goa		
2009–2010	SESA		
2010–2013	Churchill Brothers	9	(2)
2013–2014	Mohammedan	10	(0)
2014–2016	Pune City	11	(1)
2015	→ Vitória de Guimarães B (loan)	0	(0)
2016–2017	Churchill Brothers	15	(1)
2017–2018	Mohun Bagan		
2018–2021	Churchill Brothers	58	(4)
2022–2023	Delhi		

Managerial career
- 2023–2024: Delhi (assistant)
- 2024−: Goa (assistant)
- * Club domestic league appearances and goals

Israil Gurung (born 2 April 1989) is an Indian football coach and former player.

== Career ==
Gurung joined up with Portuguese 2nd division side Vitória de Guimarães B on loan from his Indian Super League team FC Pune City during the 2015 winter transfer window.

In 2018 he signed for Churchill Brothers, where he scored a goal in a 2–0 victory against Indian Arrows.

== See also ==
- List of Indian football players in foreign leagues
