= Andrés González (footballer, born 1984) =

Colombian footballer (born 1984)

Personal information
- Full name: Andrés Felipe González Ramírez
- Date of birth: 8 January 1984 (age 42)
- Place of birth: Cali, Colombia
- Height: 1.87 m (6 ft 2 in)
- Position: Centre back

Youth career
- 1995–2002: América Cali

Senior career*
Years	Team	Apps	(Gls)
2003–2007	América Cali	115	(6)
2006	→ Colo-Colo (loan)	18	(3)
2008–2011	Independiente Santa Fe	74	(1)
2011–2014	Junior	32	(0)
2014	Pune City	4	(0)

International career
2004–2009	Colombia	11	(0)
- * Club domestic league appearances and goals

Andrés Felipe González Ramírez (born 8 January 1984) is a Colombian footballer.

== Career ==
González started his career at local América de Cali, at whose system he arrived at 11, making his professional debuts eight years later. In January 2006, he was loaned to Chilean side Colo-Colo with an option to a further year, which was not activated.

In 2008, González signed for another club in his country, Independiente Santa Fe.

In 2014, González signed for Indian club, FC Pune City. He played nearly four matches in the Indian Super League.

== Honours ==
Colo-Colo

- Primera División de Chile: 2006 Apertura, 2006 Clausura
- Copa Sudamericana runner-up: 2006

Independiente Santa Fe

- Copa Colombia: 2009

Junior

- Categoría Primera A: 2011
