= Lalit Thapa =

Indian footballer

Personal information
- Full name: Lalit Thapa
- Date of birth: 20 December 1984 (age 41)
- Place of birth: Imphal, Manipur, India
- Height: 1.79 m (5 ft 10 1/2 in)
- Position: Goalkeeper

Team information
- Current team: Mohammedan (goalkeeping coach)

Senior career*
Years	Team	Apps	(Gls)
2010–2014	Churchill Brothers	12	(0)
2014	Pune City		
2015	Sporting Goa	3	(0)
2015	→ Pune City (loan)		
2016–2019	NEROCA	40	(0)
2019	Gokulam Kerala		
- * Club domestic league appearances and goals

Lalit Thapa is an Indian football coach and former professional player who is the current goalkeeping coach of Mohammedan SC.

== Club career ==
Thapa joined Churchill Brothers in 2010. Thapa was critical in Churchill Brothers 2013–14 season, especially in a game against S.C. Goa and the 3–1 win in the Federation's final also against Goa.

After it was announced that Churchill Brothers would not take part in the 2014–15 I-League Thapa said it was likely that he will join another team in the ISL or IMG. On the AIFF's decision to suspend Churchill Brothers from the league Thapa says "I really don't know what to say [about Churchill Brothers not being in I-League]. There are a lot of players who are contracted with the club," he said."

Then he joined Sporting Clube de Goa later.

In July 2015 Thapa was drafted to play for FC Pune City in the 2015 Indian Super League. He later played for NEROCA.

== International career ==
Although born in India Thapa is of Nepalese descent and thus eligible to play for either India or Nepal, although he has not made a senior appearance for either team.

== Personal life ==
Thapa is a Nepali Indian. His favorite team is Brazil national football team.

== Honours ==
Individual

- 2016 Manipur State League Best Player
