= Saïdou Panandétiguiri =

Burkinabé footballer

Personal information
- Full name: Saïdou Madi Panandétiguiri
- Date of birth: 22 March 1984 (age 42)
- Place of birth: Ouahigouya, Upper Volta
- Height: 1.80 m (5 ft 11 in)
- Positions: Centre back; right back

Youth career
- 1994–1999: Santos d'Ouagadougou
- 2000–2001: ASFA Yennenga

Senior career*
Years	Team	Apps	(Gls)
2001–2004	Bordeaux B	41	(0)
2004–2008	Lokeren	92	(0)
2008–2009	Wehen Wiesbaden	27	(0)
2009–2011	Leiria	26	(1)
2012	Valletta	13	(0)
2012–2013	Antwerp	21	(0)
2013–2014	Chippa United	5	(0)
2014	FC Pune City	7	(0)
Total		232	(1)

International career
2001	Burkina Faso U-17	6	(0)
2002–2013	Burkina Faso	57	(2)
2003	Burkina Faso U-20	3	(0)
Medal record
Representing Burkina Faso
Africa Cup of Nations
Runner-up	2013 South Africa
- * Club domestic league appearances and goals

Saïdou Madi Panandétiguiri (born 22 March 1984) is a Burkinabé former professional footballer who played as a centre back or right back. He last played for FC Pune City in the Indian Super League.

== Club career ==
Panandétiguiri was born in Ouahigouya. He began his career 1994 with Santos FC Ouagadougou and signed 2000 his first professional contract with ASFA Yennega. In 2001, he was scouted by Girondins Bordeaux, after five years in the reserve team from Girondins Bordeaux and 41 games he was sold to Lokeren. He played for Lokeren under Slavoljub Muslin. After Muslin transferred to Lokomotiv Moscow, Panandétiguiri wanted to follow him to but the transfer failed. Panandétiguiri signed on 6 May 2008 a three-year contract with SV Wehen Wiesbaden and played his first game on 24 September 2009. After just one year with SV Wehen Wiesbaden and the relegation, he signed in July 2009 with Le Havre AC, but the contract was after a short time terminated and he signed in August 2009 with U.D. Leiria.

In January 2012, Panandétiguiri signed for Maltese outfit Valletta FC, where he stayed a few months before signing with Antwerp.

== International career ==
Panandétiguiri was a member of the Burkinabé 2004 African Nations Cup team, who finished bottom of their group in the first round of competition, thus failing to secure qualification for the quarter-finals. Panandétiguiri was member for Burkina Faso at 2003 FIFA World Youth Championship and 2001 FIFA U-17 World Championship. He also played in 2008 Pre-Olympics tournament, but along with Fousseni Traoré, were found too old for a U-23 event (born on or after 1 January 1985). So the FIFA awarded Ghana who originally lost 0–2 to win 3–0.

== Career statistics ==
=== International goals ===
Scores and results list. Burkina Faso's goal tally first.

#	Date	Venue	Opponent	Score	Result	Competition
1.	18 June 2005	Stade du 4-Août, Ouagadougou	DR Congo	1–0	2–0	2006 FIFA World Cup Qualifying
2.	11 August 2010	Stade Municipal de Senlis, Senlis	Congo	2–0	3–0	Friendly
