= Tapan Maity =

Indian footballer (born 1984)

Personal information
- Full name: Tapan Maity
- Date of birth: {26-11-1990}
- Place of birth: Kolkata, India
- Height: 1.71 m (5 ft 7 1/2 in)
- Position: Midfielder

Team information
- Current team: Prayag United

Senior career*
Years	Team	Apps	(Gls)
2010–11	ONGC F.C.	4	(0)
2011–2012	Mohammedan		
2012–2013	Prayag United	19	(0)
2014	FC Pune City	1	(0)
2015	Bharat FC	8	(0)
2015–	Southern Samity	1	(0)
- * Club domestic league appearances and goals as of 24 May 2015

Tapan Maity (Hindi: तपन माइति; born 1984) is an Indian football player. He is currently playing for Prayag United in the I-League in India as a left midfielder. Before joining Prayag united he played for Mohammedan sporting, ONGC FC, Air India FC, and Maidan giants Mohun Bagan.
