= Daniele Magliocchetti =

Italian footballer (born 1986)

Personal information
- Full name: Daniele Magliocchetti
- Date of birth: 11 May 1986 (age 40)
- Place of birth: Rome, Italy
- Height: 1.83 m (6 ft 0 in)
- Position: Defender

Youth career
- Roma

Senior career*
Years	Team	Apps	(Gls)
2006–2007	Roma	0	(0)
2006–2007	→ Hellas Verona (loan)	10	(0)
2007–2011	Cagliari	4	(0)
2009–2010	→ Triestina (loan)	8	(0)
2014	FC Pune City	8	(0)
2014–2015	Aversa Normanna	15	(2)
- * Club domestic league appearances and goals

Daniele Magliocchetti (born 11 May 1986), is a former Italian football defender.

== Football career ==
He began to play in the youth system of A.S. Roma, and won the 2005 Scudetto Primavera with giallorossi, but he never played an official match with the first team.

During the 2006–07 season he played on loan with Serie B team Hellas Verona F.C., while in 2007/08 he went on loan to Cagliari Calcio as part of the agreement that brought Mauro Esposito to AS Roma.

The following season Cagliari paid €516 for his co-ownership.
