= Ashutosh Mehta =

Indian footballer

Personal information
- Date of birth: 21 February 1991 (age 35)
- Place of birth: Mumbai, Maharashtra, India
- Height: 1.79 m (5 ft 10 in)
- Position: Right-back

Team information
- Current team: SC Delhi

Senior career*
| Years | Team | Apps | (Gls) |
| 2010–2015 | Mumbai | 113 | (6) |
| 2014 | → Pune City (loan) | 7 | (0) |
| 2015–2017 | Mumbai City | 16 | (0) |
| 2015–2016 | → Mumbai (loan) | 15 | (1) |
| 2016–2017 | → Aizawl (loan) | 16 | (1) |
| 2017–2018 | ATK | 12 | (0) |
| 2018–2019 | Pune City | 7 | (0) |
| 2019–2020 | Mohun Bagan | 14 | (0) |
| 2020–2021 | NorthEast United | 18 | (1) |
| 2021–2022 | ATK Mohun Bagan | 17 | (0) |
| 2024–2025 | Jamshedpur | 14 | (0) |
| 2026– | SC Delhi | 2 | (0) |

International career^{‡}
| 2021 | India | 1 | (0) |
- * Club domestic league appearances and goals as of 28 October 2026 ‡ National team caps and goals as of 24 March 2025

Ashutosh Mehta (born 21 February 1991) is an Indian professional footballer who plays as a defender for Indian Super League club SC Delhi.

== Club career ==
=== Mumbai ===
The 2010–11 season got off to a good start for Mehta as he made his debut for Mumbai in the 2010 Federation Cup against HAL. He then made his I-League debut for Mumbai against East Bengal on 2 November 2010.

=== Mumbai City ===
In July 2015 Mehta was drafted to play for Mumbai City in the 2015 Indian Super League.

=== Mohun Bagan ===
On 6 July 2021, Mohun Bagan confirmed the signing of Mehta on its social media and various other platforms for the 2021–22 season. He has been released on May 15, 2022.

In 2022 Ashutosh Mehta failed a doping test and was banned for two years.

== International career ==
On 2 March 2021, Mehta was selected for the 35-man-squad national camp ahead of India national team's friendlies against Oman and UAE. On 25 March, he made his debut against Oman, which ended as 1–1.

== Career statistics ==
=== Club ===
As of 18 May 2022

| Club | Season | League | | | Cup | | AFC | | Total | |
| Club | Season | Division | Apps | Goals | Apps | Goals | Apps | Goals | Apps | Goals |
|---|---|---|---|---|---|---|---|---|---|---|
| Mumbai | 2011–12 | I-League | 19 | 1 | 2 (Note: Appearance(s) in Federation Cup) | 1 | — | | 21 | 1 |
| Mumbai | 2012–13 | I-League | 21 | 1 | 3 | 0 | — | | 24 | 1 |
| Mumbai | 2013–14 | I-League | 23 | 3 | 2 | 0 | — | | 25 | 3 |
| Mumbai | 2014–15 | I-League | 19 | 1 | 4 | 0 | — | | 23 | 1 |
| Mumbai | Mumbai total | | 82 | 6 | 11 | 1 | 0 | 0 | 93 | 7 |
| Pune City (loan) | 2014 | Indian Super League | 10 | 0 | 0 | 0 | — | | 10 | 0 |
| Mumbai City | 2015 | Indian Super League | 11 | 0 | 0 | 0 | — | | 11 | 0 |
| Mumbai City | 2016 | Indian Super League | 5 | 0 | 0 | 0 | — | | 5 | 0 |
| Mumbai City | Mumbai City total | | 16 | 0 | 0 | 0 | 0 | 0 | 16 | 0 |
| Mumbai (loan) | 2015–16 | I-League | 15 | 1 | 2 | 0 | — | | 17 | 1 |
| Aizawl (loan) | 2016–17 | I-League | 16 | 1 | 3 | 0 | — | | 19 | 1 |
| ATK | 2017–18 | Indian Super League | 12 | 0 | 2 (Note: Appearance(s) in Super Cup) | 1 | — | | 14 | 1 |
| Pune City | 2018–19 | Indian Super League | 7 | 0 | 0 | 0 | — | | 7 | 0 |
| Mohun Bagan | 2019–20 | I-League | 14 | 0 | 4 (Note: Appearance(s) in Durand Cup) | 0 | — | | 18 | 0 |
| NorthEast United | 2020–21 | Indian Super League | 18 | 1 | 0 | 0 | — | | 18 | 1 |
| Mohun Bagan | 2021–22 | Indian Super League | 17 | 0 | 0 | 0 | 5 (Note: Appearance(s) in AFC Cup) | 0 | 22 | 0 |
| Career total | | | 227 | 9 | 18 | 2 | 5 | 0 | 264 | 14 |

== Honours ==
Aizawl

- I-League: 2016–17

Mohun Bagan

- I-League: 2019–20
