= Omar Rodríguez (footballer) =

Colombian footballer (born 1981)

Personal information
- Full name: Omar Andrés Rodríguez Martínez
- Date of birth: March 4, 1981 (age 45)
- Place of birth: Bogotá, Colombia
- Height: 1.80 m (5 ft 11 in)
- Position: Midfielder

Youth career
- 1994–2000: Millonarios

Senior career*
| Years | Team | Apps | (Gls) |
| 2001–2005 | Millonarios | 42 | (3) |
| 2005 | Aucas | 15 | (1) |
| 2006 | Millonarios | 2 | (0) |
| 2007–2009 | Academia FC | 75 | (20) |
| 2009 | Deportivo Pasto | 15 | (1) |
| 2010–2011 | Millonarios | 39 | (2) |
| 2012 | Deportivo Pasto | 45 | (5) |
| 2013–2014 | Once Caldas | 5 | (0) |
| 2014 | FC Pune City | 1 | (0) |
| 2016–2017 | Tigres | 8 | (1) |
- * Club domestic league appearances and goals as of April 6, 2020

Omar Andrés Rodríguez Martínez (born March 4, 1981) is a retired Colombian football midfielder.

== Club career ==
Rodríguez is a product of the Millonarios youth system and has played with the Millonarios first team since January 2001.

He was released by FC Pune City due to his kidney problems.

== Statistics (Official games/Colombian Ligue and Colombian Cup) ==
(As of November 14, 2011)

| Year | Team | Colombian Ligue Matches | Goals | Colombian Cup Matches | Goals | Total Matches | Total Goals |
|---|---|---|---|---|---|---|---|
| 2001 | Millonarios | 5 | 0 | 0 | 0 | 5 | 0 |
| 2002 | Millonarios | 3 | 0 | 0 | 0 | 3 | 0 |
| 2003 | Millonarios | 0 | 0 | 0 | 0 | 0 | 0 |
| 2004 | Millonarios | 21 | 2 | 0 | 0 | 21 | 2 |
| 2005 | Millonarios | 13 | 1 | 0 | 0 | 13 | 1 |
| 2006 | Millonarios | 2 | 0 | 0 | 0 | 2 | 0 |
| 2010 | Millonarios | 21 | 0 | 7 | 3 | 28 | 3 |
| 2011 | Millonarios | 18 | 2 | 5 | 3 | 23 | 5 |
| Total | Millonarios | 83 | 5 | 12 | 6 | 95 | 11 |
