= Pritam Kotal =

Indian footballer (born 1993)

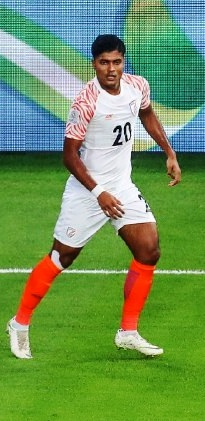
- Kotal playing for India at the 2019 AFC Asian Cup

Personal information
- Full name: Pritam Kotal
- Date of birth: 8 September 1993 (age 33)
- Place of birth: Uttarpara, West Bengal, India
- Height: 1.79 m (5 ft 10 in)
- Positions: Right-back; centre-back

Team information
- Current team: Sreenidi Deccan
- Number: 20

Youth career
- 1997–2009: Chirag United
- 2009–2010: Wari

Senior career*
Years	Team	Apps	(Gls)
2011–2013	Pailan Arrows	32	(0)
2013–2017	Mohun Bagan	61	(3)
2014	→ Pune City (loan)	10	(0)
2015	→ Pune City (loan)	2	(0)
2016	→ ATK (loan)	12	(0)
2017–2018	Delhi Dynamos	24	(2)
2019–2020	ATK	27	(1)
2020–2023	Mohun Bagan	68	(2)
2023–2025	Kerala Blasters	33	(0)
2025–2026	Chennaiyin	20	(0)
2026–	Sreenidi Deccan		

International career
2011–2012	India U19	3	(0)
2012–2016	India U23	10	(1)
2015–	India	52	(0)
Medal record
Men's football
Representing India
SAFF Championship
Winner	2015 India
Winner	2021 Maldives
Winner	2023 India
- * Club domestic league appearances and goals as of 23:59, 21 May 2026 (UTC)

Pritam Kotal (Bengali: প্রীতম কোটাল; born 8 September 1993) is an Indian professional footballer who plays as a defender for Indian Football League club Sreenidi Deccan.

After passing through the youth academies of Chirag United and Wari, Kotal joined Palian Arrows in 2011. He made only 26 appearances for the club, as Kotal signed for Mohun Bagan in 2013. He later would later go on loan to Pune City and ATK, before returning to Mohun Bagan in 2017. During his first tenure with the Mariners, Kotal scored three goals in 61 appearances, before departing for Delhi Dynamos. After impressing in his first season with the club, he was given the captain armband in 2018. Kotal returned to ATK a year later, this time as a permanent transfer. He would win his second league title in 2020. As ATK and Mohun Bagan merged into one club that same year, Kotal joined the club. He would win his third league title with the club a year later. Kotal would join Kerala Blasters in 2023.

== Club career ==
=== Early career and Indian Arrows ===
Born in Uttarpara, West Bengal, Kotal began playing football at the age of four after being inspired by his uncle, who was also a footballer. He began his youth career with Chirag United before playing for the West Bengal youth team. Kotal also played for Wari in 2009.

After spending time with the India under-19 side, Kotal joined the All India Football Federation's development I-League side, Pailan Arrows (current Indian Arrows). He played in six matches during his debut 2011–12 season for the side.

=== Mohun Bagan ===
==== 2013–16: First goals and loan spells ====
After Pailan Arrows disbanded and before the 2013–14 season, Kotal signed with Mohun Bagan. He made his debut for the club on 23 October 2013 against Salgaocar. He came on as an 85th-minute substitute for Aiborlang Khongjee as Mohun Bagan won 2–1. Kotal scored his first goal for the club on 7 February 2015 against Pune. His 77th-minute goal was the only one in a 1–0 victory for Mohun Bagan. He scored his second goal of his career, and second of the season on 20 May against Royal Wahingdoh. His goal was the first of two as Mohun Bagan won 2–0. As well as by providing two goals, Kotal also helped Mohun Bagan to win their first ever I-League title, and thus Mohun Bagan became the first side from Kolkata to win the title, since the inception of league in 2007. Kotal played the 2015-16 I-League campaign, and played his first match of the season against Aizawl on 9 January 2016. Kotal scored an own goal in that match, thereby Aizawl getting an equalizer. But after the final whistle, Mohun Bagan went on to win the match 3–1. Kotal played his first continental match on 27 January, when he played the East zone preliminary round 1 match of the 2016 AFC Champions League's qualifying play-off match against Tampines Rovers FC on 27 January 2016, which they won 3–1 after final whistle. Mohun Bagan after was redirected to 2016 AFC Cup, when they failed to make it to the group stages of the 2016 AFC Champions League. Kotal played his first AFC Cup match against South China AA on 9 March, where they won the match on a big margin of 0–4. Kotal later that season left the club on loan for his second spell at FC Pune City, and from there, he went on to play for Atletico de Kolkata in the 2016 ISL season.

==== 2016–17: Return to Mohun Bagan and departure ====
He returned to the club after winning the 2016 Indian Super League title with Atlético de Kolkata for the 2016-17 I-League season in early 2017. He scored his first goal for the club that season against Mumbai FC on 8 March 2017, where he opened the scored sheet in the 12th minute of the match, which concluded in a 2–2 draw after the final whistle. Kotal played his last match for the club against Chennai City FC on 30 April, which ended 2–1 with Mohun Bagan taking the three points of the match. Kotal then left the club to join Delhi Dynamos on a permanent deal.

==== 2014–15: Loan spells at Pune City ====
In July 2014, it was announced that Kotal would be among 84 Indian players who would be a part of the 2014 ISL Inaugural Domestic Draft, being available on loan from Mohun Bagan. On 22 July 2014, he was drafted in the fifth round of the draft by Pune City. He made his debut for the club in the Indian Super League on 18 October against Mumbai City FC. Despite starting the match, Pune City lost the match against their Maharashtra rivals 5–0. After his first season at the club, Kotal said that the experience of playing in the Indian Super League really helped him, that he played as a left back for all the games he played, and playing with the former Inter Milan defender Bruno Cirillo really helped him to improve his style of play.

Kotal returned to Pune City for the 2015 season, but he played only two matches in that season.

==== 2016: Loan to Atlético de Kolkata ====
On 14 June 2016 it was announced that Kotal had signed with Atlético de Kolkata (later ATK) on loan for the 2016 Indian Super League. He made his debut for the side on 2 October against Chennaiyin FC. Kotal started in the match and played the whole 90 minutes, as Atlético de Kolkata drew 2–2. Kolkata had a breakthrough season as they went on to qualify for the knockout stages of the season. Kolkata faced Mumbai City in the semi-finals, and progressed through to the final on an aggregate score of 3–2 from both legs. During the second leg of the semi-final against Mumbai on 13 December, Kotal was involved in a brawl that broke after the final whistle of the game. He said that he was mildly injured during the scuffle, and felt a sensation of blindness. He later confirmed that he was fine. Kolkata then went on to face Kerala Blasters FC in the final match of the season, which they won 4–3 on penalty shootout, after the match drew 1–1 after the full time and extra time. Kotal thus won his maiden ISL title, and Atlético de Kolkata was emerged as the champions for the second time in their history.

=== Delhi Dynamos ===
==== 2017–18: Debut season and impressions ====
Kotal joined Indian Super League side Delhi Dynamos FC (current Odisha FC) for the 2017–18 season. He played his debut match for the club against FC Pune City on 22 November 2017, which ended in a 2–3 victory for Delhi. He scored his debut goal for the club against Kerala Blasters on 10 January 2018, where Kotal scored the equalizer in the 44th minute, but the match turned out to be a defeat, after Kerala scored two more goals, resulting in a 1–3 defeat for Delhi.

==== 2018–19: Assuming the captaincy and departure ====
He stayed at the club for the 2018–19 season and he was given captain's armband for his impressive 2017-18 campaign. He played his first match of the season against Pune City on 3 October 2018 in a 1–1 draw. Kotal scored his first goal of the season against his former club ATK on 17 October, which ended in a 1–2 loss for Delhi. He played his last match for Delhi Dynamos on 3 March 2019 in the return match against ATK, which again ended in a 2–1 defeat for Delhi. Kotal stayed two seasons at Delhi Dynamos, and left the club to return to ATK in January transfer window.

=== Return to ATK ===
In the late 2018, it was being reported, and later confirmed that Kotal would be returning to ATK after the 2019 AFC Asian Cup in the January transfer window. He played his remaining 2018-19 campaign with ATK, and played his first match with ATK that season against Kerala Blasters on 25 January 2019, which ended in a 1–1 draw. Kotal played his first match in a regular season after returning to ATK in the 2019–20 Indian Super League season against Kerala Blasters in the opening match of the season on 20 October, which they eventually lost 2–1 after taking the lead in the beginning of the match. He scored his debut goal for ATK and first of this season against FC Goa on 18 January 2020, where he opened the score sheet in the 47th minute of the match, which ended 2–0 victory for ATK. ATK qualified for the knockout stages of the 2019–20 season, and progressed through to final after defeating Bengaluru FC in an aggregate score of 3–2 from both legs to face Chennaiyin FC in the final. Kotal played the final that took place in Fatorda Stadium in Goa, where they emerged victorious after defeating Chennaiyin 3–1 in the final whistle. Kotal thus won his second ISL title, and ATK won the trophy for a record third time.

=== Return to Mohun Bagan ===
==== 2020–21: Return season, first goals, and league runner-up ====
After ATK merged with his former club Mohun Bagan, the new merged brand came to be called ATK Mohun Bagan FC, who would play in the Indian Super League from the 2020–21 season. Kotal was signed by the squad, and was named one of the 5 captains for the season by the coach Antonio Habas. He played his 62nd match for Mohun Bagan in ISL against Kerala Blasters in the opening match of the season on 20 October 2020, which they won 0–1 at GMC Athletic Stadium, Goa. Kotal scored his 4th goal for the club against Hyderabad FC in a 2–2 draw on 22 February 2021, where he scored in the injury time, thereby equalising the game for ATK Mohun Bagan. Mohun Bagan qualified for the Indian Super League final in their maiden season after defeating NorthEast United FC on an aggregate score of 3–2 in the semi-finals from both legs. Kotal played in the final against Mumbai City on 13 March, in which they were defeated by a 2–1 score after Mumbai City scored a last minute goal.

==== 2021–22: Semi-finalist ====
For the 2021–22 season, Kotal was appointed as one of the captains of the club. He played his first match of the season against Bengaluru FC in the 2021 AFC Cup group stage match on 18 August 2021, which they won 2–0 at full-time. He scored his only goal of the season on 6 December against Jamshedpur FC in the Indian Super League, which they lost 2–1 even-though Kotal scored an 88th-minute goal.

On 18 May 2022, Kotal scored his last goal for ATK Mohun Bagan in the 2022 AFC Cup group stage match against Gokulam Kerala FC, where he equalized in the 53rd minute, but they would go on to lose the match by the score of 4–2 at the end of the game.

==== 2022–23: League title and departure ====
During this season, he played all the matches for ATK Mohun Bagan in the league and won the league championship for the third time in his career after defeating Bengaluru on penalty shoot-outs.

=== Kerala Blasters ===
On 14 July 2023, Kerala Blasters announced the signing of Kotal on a 3-year deal until 2026. Mohun Bagan swapped Kotal for Sahal Abdul Samad and reportedly paid a transfer fee of 90 lakhs to the Blasters. He made his debut for the club on 13 August 2023 in a 4–3 loss against Gokulam Kerala in the 2023 Durand Cup. On 21 September, Pritam made his debut for the club in the Indian Super League, in the season opener against Bengaluru FC at home, which the Blasters won 2–1.

== International career ==
=== Youth ===
==== 2011–2012: Beginnings and AFC U-19 Championship qualification ====
Kotal first began his international career for India at the under-19 level. After successfully going through a trial, Kotal was selected into the squad that went on an exposure trip to China before playing for the side during the 2012 AFC U-19 Championship qualifiers which India failed to make.

==== 2012–2016: AFC U-22 Championship qualification and Asian Games ====
He then played for the under-22 side during the 2013 AFC U-22 Championship qualifiers in Oman. He was then part of the under-23 side to participate at the 2014 Asian Games in South Korea. Kotal's participation with the under-23 side continued further, as he was a part of the 2015's India's squad that took part in the 2016 AFC U-23 Championship qualifiers in Bangladesh.

=== Senior ===
==== 2015–2018: Beginnings, SAFF Championship, and Intercontinental Cup title ====
After his impressive performances at club level, Kotal made it to the senior national squad of India, and made his international debut on 12 March 2015 in their 2018 FIFA World Cup qualifying match against Nepal. The match was also Stephen Constantine's first match as the head coach for India. He played the full match but earned a sixth minute yellow card as India won 2–0. Nine months later, on 3 January 2016, Kotal helped India clinch the SAFF Championship, when they defeated the reigning champions Afghanistan 2–1 in extra-time. Kotal started the match and played the entire match for India. He was called up for the squad of India, that took part in the 2018 Intercontinental Cup. He started in the final against Kenya on 10 August 2018, which India won 2–0.

==== 2019: King's Cup and first Asian Cup ====
Kotal was later called up for India's squad for the 2019 King's Cup.

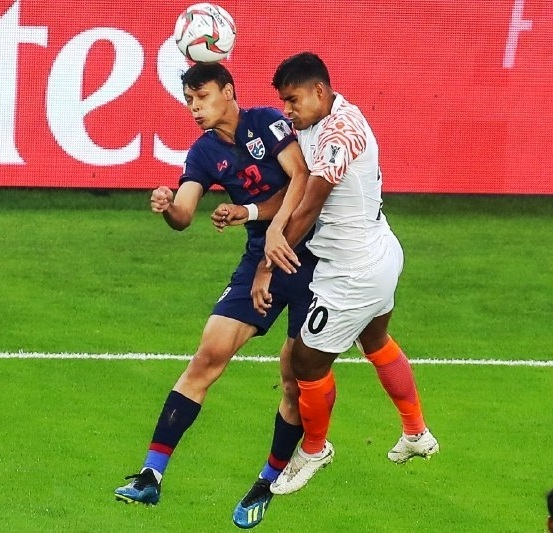
Kotal in a melee during 2019 AFC Asian Cup group match against Thailand.

India qualified for the 2019 AFC Asian Cup after missing out of the 2015's edition. Kotal played five matches in the qualifiers for India in the 2019 AFC Asian Cup. Kotal was included in the 23-member squad of India to travel to UAE. He played his debut match in any edition AFC Asian Cup, and also his first of the 2019 edition on 6 January 2019, where India outplayed Thailand, and defeated them with an humongous score of 1–4. It was also India's first victory in an AFC Asian Cup match in 55 years, and was also their biggest win in Asian Cup history. Kotal played all three matches in their group stage including the do-or-die match against Bahrain on 14 January, which India lost 0–1, resulting in the elimination of India from the campaign.

== Style of play ==
Kotal is a versatile right back who is capable of playing any role in the defensive area.

== Personal life ==
Kotal's date of birth is contentious with many different dates being reported but he is believed to have been born in the Uttarpara, West Bengal on 8 September 1993. His dad was a rickshaw puller, and his uncle played football, who introduced him to playing football. Kotal idolized former Indian international Deepak Mondal, who used to play as a right back during his playing time. In 2020, Kotal launched an academy to provide training and practice to the underprivileged young footballers. In March 2020, he donated Indian rupees 50,000 to the West Bengal Chief Minister's fund for the COVID-19 pandemic.

In April 2023, Kotal married his long-time girlfriend and Bengali sports-reporter Sonela Paul.

== Career statistics ==
=== Club ===
As of 12 October 2024

Club	Season	League			Cup		Continental		Total	
Club	Season	Division	Apps	Goals	Apps	Goals	Apps	Goals	Apps	Goals
Pailan Arrows	2011–12	I-League	6	0	0	0	—		6	0
Pailan Arrows	2012–13	I-League	26	0	3 (Note: Appearance(s) in Federation Cup) (Note: Appearance(s) in Durand Cup)	0	—		29	0
Pailan Arrows	Total		32	0	3	0	0	0	35	0
Mohun Bagan	2013–14	I-League	20	0	4	0	—		24	0
Mohun Bagan	2014–15	I-League	17	2	0	0	—		17	2
Mohun Bagan	2015–16	I-League	6	0	5	0	4 (Note: Appearance(s) in AFC Champions League) (Note: Appearance(s) in AFC Cup)	0	15	0
Mohun Bagan	2016–17	I-League	18	1	5	0	2	0	25	1
Mohun Bagan	Total		61	3	14	0	6	0	81	3
Pune City (loan)	2014	Indian Super League	10	0	0	0	—		10	0
Pune City (loan)	2015	Indian Super League	2	0	0	0	—		2	0
Pune City (loan)	Total		12	0	0	0	0	0	12	0
ATK (loan)	2016	Indian Super League	12	0	0	0	—		12	0
Delhi Dynamos	2017–18	Indian Super League	14	1	1 (Note: Appearance(s) in Super Cup)	0	—		15	0
Delhi Dynamos	2018–19	Indian Super League	10	1	0	0	—		10	1
Delhi Dynamos	Total		24	2	1	0	0	0	25	2
ATK	2018–19	Indian Super League	6	0	3	0	—		9	0
ATK	2019–20	Indian Super League	21	1	0	0	—		21	1
ATK	Total		27	1	3	0	0	0	30	1
Mohun Bagan	2020–21	Indian Super League	22	1	0	0	—		22	1
Mohun Bagan	2021–22	Indian Super League	22	1	0	0	9	1	31	2
Mohun Bagan	2022–23	Indian Super League	24	0	4	0	2 (Note: Appearance in AFC Cup and Indian club qualifiers for 2023–24 AFC competitions)	0	30	0
Mohun Bagan	Total		68	2	4	0	11	1	83	3
Kerala Blasters	2023–24	Indian Super League	19	0	3 (Note: One appearance in 2023 Durand Cup)	0	—		22	0
Kerala Blasters	2024–25	Indian Super League	4	0	3	0	0	0	7	0
Kerala Blasters	Total		23	0	6	0	0	0	29	0
Career total			247	8	31	0	17	1	295	9

=== International ===
As of 1 July 2023

India
Year	Apps	Goals
2015	9	0
2016	4	0
2017	9	0
2018	7	0
2019	7	0
2021	7	0
2022	4	0
2023	5	0
Total	52	0

== Honours ==
Mohun Bagan

- I-League: 2014–15
- Federation Cup: 2015–16
- Indian Super League Championship: 2022–23; runner-up: 2020–21; Premiership runner-up: 2020–21

ATK

- Indian Super League: 2016, 2019–20

India

- SAFF Championship: 2015, 2021, 2023
- Tri-Nation Series: 2017, 2023
- Intercontinental Cup: 2018, 2023
- King's Cup third place: 2019

India U23

- South Asian Games silver medal: 2016

Individual

- AIFF Emerging Player of the Year: 2015
