= Dharmaraj Ravanan =

Indian footballer (born 1987)

Personal information
- Full name: Dharmaraj Ravanan
- Date of birth: 29 July 1987 (age 39)
- Place of birth: Tiruchirappalli, Tamil Nadu, India
- Height: 1.79 m (5 ft 10 1/2 in)
- Position: Defender

Youth career
- Indian Bank

Senior career*
Years	Team	Apps	(Gls)
2005–2006	Dempo	24	
2006–2007	Mohun Bagan	26	
2007–2010	Mahindra United	56	
2010–2014	Churchill Brothers	78	(1)
2014–2017	Pune City	34	(0)
2015	→ Bharat FC (loan)	18	(0)
2016	→ SC de Goa (loan)	9	(0)
2017–2018	Chennai City	35	(0)
2018–2019	Real Kashmir	21	(0)
2019–2020	Gokulam Kerala FC	2	(0)
2020–2021	Real Kashmir		

International career
2008–2010	India U23	15	(1)
- * Club domestic league appearances and goals

Dharmaraj Ravanan (born 27 July 1987) is an Indian professional football player who plays as a defender. He most recently appeared with I-League club Real Kashmir.

== Career ==
Ravanan started his professional career at Dempo S.C., coach Armando Colaco saw him in Bangalore when he was playing for Chennai's Indian Bank and he gave him an opportunity and at 19 he joined them where he learned a lot from his teammates. The following year he moved to Mohun Bagan, but there it was a different experience and thereafter he joined Mahindra United. At Mahindra United he learned a lot from his coaches Derrick Pereira and David Booth. Then he joined Churchill Brothers. He captained Churchill Brothers to the I-League (2013), and Federation Cup (2014) titles. He also played for FC Pune City in the inaugural edition of the Indian Super League. He later joined new entrants Bharat FC for the 2014-15 I-League On Loan from FC Pune City season after Churchill Brothers had been axed from the 2014–15 season for failing to pass the club licensing criteria. While he continued to play for FC Pune City for next Two Season 2015 & 2016 in the Indian Super League.In 2015–16 I-League Season he joined SC de Goa on Loan from his ISL Team FC Pune City. Later he Joined His Home Town Club Chennai City F.C. in the I-League 2016–17 and Captained his Team through the Season, and remained with the club for next Season as well in 2017–18 I-League.

== Honours ==
India U23

- SAFF Championship: 2009

Churchill Brothers

- Durand Cup: 2011
- IFA Shield: 2011
- I-League: 2012–13
- Federation Cup: 2013–14

Mohun Bagan

- Federation Cup 2006

Mahindra United

- IFA shield – 2008
- Durand cup – 2008–2009

Real Kashmir

- IFA Shield: 2020
