= Lenny Rodrigues =

Indian footballer (born 1987)

Personal information
- Date of birth: 10 May 1987 (age 39)
- Place of birth: Cortalim, Goa, India
- Height: 1.85 m (6 ft 1 in)
- Position: Central midfielder

Team information
- Current team: Thrissur Magic
- Number: 24

Youth career
- Fransa-Pax
- Salgaocar
- Churchill Brothers

Senior career*
Years	Team	Apps	(Gls)
2008–2014	Churchill Brothers	50	(1)
2014–2016	Pune City	29	(1)
2015	→ Dempo (loan)	18	(1)
2016	→ Mohun Bagan (loan)	8	(1)
2017	→ Bengaluru (loan)	14	(1)
2017–2018	Bengaluru	17	(1)
2018–2021	Goa	51	(2)
2021–2023	Mohun Bagan	37	(1)
2023	Goa	2	(0)
2023–2024	Odisha	23	(0)
2024–2025	Hyderabad	11	(0)
2025–	Thrissur Magic	5	(0)

International career
2012–2015	India	22	(0)
- * Club domestic league appearances and goals as of 13:03, 3 October 2025 (UTC)

Lenny Rodrigues (born 10 May 1987) is an Indian professional footballer who plays as a central midfielder for Super League Kerala club Thrissur Magic.

== Club career ==
=== Early career ===
Born in Cortalim, Goa, began to develop a passion for football when his grandfather took him to watch local matches. He began playing for Fransa-Pax before the club folded. Rodrigues then spent a year and a half with Salgaocar before turning down a professional contract with the club to join his boyhood club, Churchill Brothers. While with Churchill Brothers, Rodrigues helped the club win the I-League twice, one Federation Cup, and one Durand Cup. Also while with Churchill Brothers, Rodrigues made the transition from playing as a forward to playing as a defensive midfielder.

=== Pune City ===
On 22 July 2014, Rodrigues was selected as the first ever pick in the 2014 ISL Inaugural Domestic Draft by Pune City. He made his debut for the club in their first ever match against Delhi Dynamos on 14 October 2014. He started and played the whole match as it ended 0–0.

==== Dempo and Mohun Bagan loans ====
Prior to the 2014–15 season, Rodrigues was loaned out to I-League side, Dempo. He made his debut for the club on 17 January 2015 against Bengaluru. He started and played the whole match as it ended 0–0. The next season, Rodrigues was loaned to Mohun Bagan. He made his debut for the club in their AFC Cup match against Maziya. He started and played 84 minutes as Mohun Bagan won 5–2.

==== Bengaluru loan ====
After the conclusion of the 2016 ISL season, Rodrigues was loaned out to another I-League side, Bengaluru, on 15 December 2016. Rodrigues made his debut for the club on 7 January 2017 in their opening match against Shillong Lajong. Partnering with Cameron Watson, he started and played the whole match as Bengaluru won 3–0. Rodrigues then scored his first goal for the club on 5 March 2017 against Minerva Punjab. His 17th-minute striker was the only one in a 1–0 victory for Bengaluru.

=== Bengaluru ===
On 23 July 2017, Rodrigues was selected in the 8th round of the 2017–18 ISL Players Draft by Bengaluru for the 2017–18 Indian Super League. He then made his re-debut for the side on 23 August 2017 in their AFC Cup knockout match against April 25. He started the match and scored Bengaluru's third goal in a 3–0 victory before coming off in the 89th minute.

On 20 April 2018, Rodrigues earned his only trophy for the club as a permanent player when he started for Bengaluru in their 4–1 victory over East Bengal in the Super Cup.

=== Goa ===
On 20 March 2018 it was announced that Rodrigues would move to Goa for the 2018–19 season. During the 2018–19 ISL season Lenny, along with Ahmed Jahouh formed a solid midfielding partnership for FC Goa. Lenny was one of the top five passers in the Indian Super League. He started all the league matches and Super Cup matches for FC Goa. He showed his potential of acting as a deep lying playmaker. He recorded the highest passing accuracy of nearly 85% among Indians which is very good considering Indian standard. His work rate in all matches throughout the season was impressive. He intercepted the ball, tackled, and forwarded the ball. Due to his impressive performance throughout the season, he won the award of Indian player of the season for FC Goa.

=== Mohun Bagan ===
In 2021 January transfer window he joined Mohun Bagan from FC Goa, on an 18-month contract. He made his debut against Odisha FC, which Mohun Bagan won 4–1.

=== Hyderabad FC ===
Lenny joined Hyderabad FC for the 2024–25 season which is playing with an all-Indian squad this season.

=== Thrissur Magic ===
In September 2025, Rodrigues joined Super League Kerala club Thrissur Magic.

== International career ==
Rodrigues made his international debut for India on 23 February 2012 against Oman. He came on as a substitute as India lost 5–1.

=== International stats ===
As of 17 March 2015

India national team
Year	Apps	Goals
2012	7	0
2013	11	0
2014	2	0
2015	2	0
Total	22	0

== Honours ==
Churchill Brothers

- I-League: 2008–09, 2012–13
- Federation Cup: 2013–14
- Durand Cup: 2009

Mohun Bagan

- Federation Cup: 2015–16 Indian Super League Cup : 2022–2023

Bengaluru

- Super Cup: 2018
- Federation Cup: 2016–17
- Indian Super Cup: 2019
- Indian Super League premiership: 2019–20

India

- SAFF Championship runner-up: 2013
- Nehru Cup: 2012

== Personal life ==
In January 2020, he got married and lives in Goa.
