= 2015 Kerala Blasters FC season =

2nd season in existence of Kerala Blasters FC

Kerala Blasters
2015 season
- General Manager: Viren D'Silva
- Head Coach: Peter Taylor (until 1 November); Terry Phelan (from 1 November)
- Stadium: Jawaharlal Nehru Stadium
- Top goalscorer: Chris Dagnall (6) Antonio German (6)
- Highest home attendance: 62,013
- Lowest home attendance: 32,313
- Average home league attendance: 52,008
Home colours	Away colours

The 2015 season was the second season in Kerala Blasters FC's existence, as well as their second season in Indian Super League. The club were the runner-up in the 2014 ISL tournament where they lost to Atlético de Kolkata 0–1 in the final. The club appointed former England-U20 manager Peter Taylor as its new manager for the 2015 season after the departure of David James.

== Season overview ==
After the 2014 season, it was announced that David James would not return to the club as head coach and marquee player. On 12 May 2015 it was announced that former England U20 head coach Peter Taylor would take over as the Blasters head coach. New foreign signings coming into the season included Peter Ramage, Stephen Bywater, Bruno Perone, Sanchez Watt, João Coimbra, and marquee signing Carlos Marchena.

The first match of the season was played at the Jawaharlal Nehru Stadium, with the Kerala Blasters hosting NorthEast United. The Kerala Blasters won 3–1 through goals from Josu, Mohammed Rafi, and Sanchez Watt. However, the Blasters followed that victory drawing their next match against Mumbai City and then losing their next four matches which eventually led to the dismissal of Peter Taylor as head coach. Assistant coach Trevor Morgan was in charge for one match before Terry Phelan was named head coach for the rest of the season. Fortunes failed to change for the Kerala Blasters as the club ended their second season in last place, failing to qualify for the Indian Super League finals.

== Players and staff ==
=== Squad ===
Note: Flags indicate national team as defined under FIFA eligibility rules; some limited exceptions apply. Players may hold more than one non-FIFA nationality.

No.	Pos.	Nation	Player
2	MF	IND	Rahul Bheke (on loan from East Bengal)
4	DF	IND	Ramandeep Singh
5	DF	ENG	Peter Ramage
7	MF	IND	Cavin Lobo (on loan from East Bengal)
8	MF	POR	João Coimbra
11	MF	IND	Ishfaq Ahmed
12	MF	IND	Shankar Sampingiraj (on loan from Bengaluru FC)
13	MF	IND	C.K. Vineeth (on loan from Bengaluru FC)
14	MF	IND	Mehtab Hossain (on loan from East Bengal)
15	DF	IND	Sandesh Jhingan
16	DF	IND	Gurwinder Singh (on loan from East Bengal)
17	FW	IND	Manandeep Singh
18	DF	IND	Deepak Mondal (on loan from East Bengal)

No.	Pos.	Nation	Player
20	FW	IND	Mohammed Rafi
21	FW	ENG	Antonio German
22	GK	IND	Shilton Paul (on loan from Mohun Bagan)
23	DF	BRA	Bruno Perone
24	GK	IND	Sandip Nandy
29	DF	IND	Saumik Dey (on loan from East Bengal)
30	DF	ENG	Marcus Williams
43	GK	ENG	Stephen Bywater
44	DF	BRA	Rodrigo Arroz
66	MF	IND	Peter Carvalho (on loan from Dempo S.C.)
85	MF	ESP	Pulga
99	MF	ESP	Josu
—	DF	IND	Nirmal Chettri

Source: Indian Super League 2015

== Transfers ==
=== In ===
==== Pre-season ====
No.	Pos	Player	Transferred From	Fee	Date	Source
9	ST	(England) Chris Dagnall	(England) Leyton Orient	Free	1 July 2015	
17	ST	(India) Manandeep Singh	(India) Delhi Dynamos	Free	1 July 2015	
20	ST	(India) Mohammed Rafi	(India) Mumbai F.C.	Free	1 July 2015	
8	CM	(Portugal) João Coimbra	(Romania) Rapid București	Free	3 August 2015	
10	LW	(England) Sanchez Watt	(England) Colchester United	Free	4 August 2015	
23	CB	(Brazil) Bruno Perone	(Brazil) Grêmio Novorizontino	Free	18 August 2015	
5	CB	(England) Peter Ramage	(England) Crystal Palace	Free	24 August 2015	
43	GK	(England) Stephen Bywater	(England) Doncaster Rovers	Free	24 August 2015	
21	ST	(England) Antonio German	(England) Gillingham	Free	26 August 2015	
6	CB	(Spain) Carlos Marchena	(Spain) Deportivo La Coruña	Free	28 August 2015	
30	LB	(England) Marcus Williams	(England) Scunthorpe United	Free	29 August 2015	
99	AM	(Spain) Josu	(Poland) Górnik Łęczna	Free	6 August 2015	

==== During the season ====
No.	Pos	Player	Transferred From	Fee	Date	Source
44	CB	(Brazil) Rodrigo Arroz	(Brazil) S.E.R. Caxias do Sul	Free	26 November 2015	

=== Out ===
==== Pre-season ====
No.	Pos	Player	Transferred To	Fee	Date	Source
9	ST	(Brazil) Pedro Gusmão	(Brazil) Atlético Paranaense	Loan Return	31 December 2014	
12	ST	(India) Chinadorai Sabeeth	(India) Mohun Bagan	Loan Return	31 December 2014	
32	CB	(Republic of Ireland) Colin Falvey	(United States) Charleston Battery	Loan Return	31 December 2014	
44	CB	(Brazil) Erwin Spitzner	(Brazil) Atlético Paranaense	Loan Return	31 December 2014	
14	MF	(India) Mehtab Hossain	(India) East Bengal	Loan Return	31 December 2014	
16	DF	(India) Gurwinder Singh	(India) East Bengal	Loan Return	31 December 2014	
29	DF	(India) Saumik Dey	(India) East Bengal	Loan Return	31 December 2014	
30	GK	(India) Luis Barreto	(India) East Bengal	Loan Return	31 December 2014	
70	GK	(England) David James		Retired	31 December 2014	
13	CM	(India) Duleep Menon	Free Agent	Free	1 January 2015	
23	RB	(India) Avinabo Bag	Free Agent	Free	1 January 2015	
27	ST	(Australia) Andrew Barisic	(Australia) Melbourne Knights	Free	1 January 2015	
88	ST	(India) Milagres Gonsalves	(India) Salgaocar F.C.	Free	1 January 2015	
18	CM	(Nigeria) Penn Orji	(India) Shillong Lajong	Free	15 January 2015	
3	LB	(Scotland) Jamie McAllister	(England) Exeter City	Free	16 January 2015	
21	RM	(India) Godwin Franco	(India) Royal Wahingdoh	Free	5 February 2015	
25	CM	(Scotland) Stephen Pearson	(Scotland) Motherwell	Free	19 January 2015	
22	CB	(France) Raphaël Romey	(France) FC Istres	Free	25 January 2015	
10	ST	(Canada) Iain Hume	(England) Tranmere Rovers	Free	29 January 2015	
8	ST	(England) Michael Chopra	(Scotland) Alloa Athletic	Free	17 March 2015	
2	RB	(France) Cédric Hengbart	(India) NorthEast United	Free	3 July 2015	
7	DM	(India) Sushanth Mathew	(India) FC Pune City	Free	10 July 2015	

==== During the season ====
No.	Pos	Player	Transferred To	Fee	Date	Source
6	CB	(Spain) Carlos Marchena	(Spain) CD Gerena	Free	19 November 2015	
10	LW	(England) Sanchez Watt	Free Agent	Free	26 November 2015	
9	ST	(England) Chris Dagnall	(Scotland) Hibernian F.C.	Free	23 December 2015	

=== Loan in ===
==== Pre-season ====
No.	Pos	Player	Loaned From	Start	End	Source
14	DM	(India) Mehtab Hossain	(India) East Bengal	1 July 2015	31 December 2015	
16	CB	(India) Gurwinder Singh	(India) East Bengal	1 July 2015	31 December 2015	
18	CB	(India) Deepak Mondal	(India) East Bengal	1 July 2015	31 December 2015	
22	GK	(India) Shilton Paul	(India) Mohun Bagan	1 July 2015	31 December 2015	
29	LB	(India) Saumik Dey	(India) East Bengal	1 July 2015	31 December 2015	
7	LM	(India) Cavin Lobo	(India) East Bengal	10 July 2015	31 December 2015	
12	CM	(India) Shankar Sampingiraj	(India) Bengaluru	10 July 2015	31 December 2015	
13	CM	(India) C.K. Vineeth	(India) Bengaluru	10 July 2015	31 December 2015	
66	DM	(India) Peter Carvalho	(India) Dempo S.C.	10 July 2015	31 December 2015	

==== During the season ====
No.	Pos	Player	Loaned From	Start	End	Source
2	RB	(India) Rahul Bheke	(India) East Bengal	13 September 2015	31 December 2015	

=== Loan Out ===
==== Pre-season ====
No.	Pos	Player	Loaned To	Start	End	Source
6	LM	(India) Renedy Singh	(Bulgaria) CSKA Sofia	27 February 2015	30 June 2015	

== Pre-season ==
10 September 2015 Friendly	Kerala Blasters	10-2	KSEB FC	Thiruvananthapuram
				Stadium: Green Field Stadium

22 September 2015 Friendly	Kerala Blasters	7-0	SBT	Thiruvananthapuram
		Official Facebook Post		Stadium: Green Field Stadium

24 September 2015 Friendly	Kerala Blasters	2-0	Southern Samity	Thiruvananthapuram
				Stadium: Green Field Stadium

26 September 2015 Friendly	Kerala Blasters	0-0	Southern Samity	Thiruvananthapuram
				Stadium: Green Field Stadium

29 September 2015 Friendly	Kerala Blasters	7-0	AG's Office, Thiruvananthapuram	Thiruvananthapuram
		Report		Stadium: Green Field Stadium

== Indian Super League ==
=== League table ===
Pos	Team	Pld	W	D	L	GF	GA	GD	Pts	Qualification or relegation
4	Delhi Dynamos	14	6	4	4	18	20	−2	22	Advance to ISL Play-offs
5	NorthEast United	14	6	2	6	18	23	−5	20	
6	Mumbai City	14	4	4	6	16	26	−10	16	
7	Pune City	14	4	3	7	17	23	−6	15	
8	Kerala Blasters	14	3	4	7	22	27	−5	13	

Source: Indian Super League standings
Rules for classification: 1) points; 2) goal difference; 3) number of goals scored.

=== Results summary ===
Overall								Home						Away					
Pld	W	D	L	GF	GA	GD	Pts	W	D	L	GF	GA	GD	W	D	L	GF	GA	GD
14	3	4	7	22	27	−5	13	2	2	3	9	11	−2	1	2	4	13	16	−3

Last updated: 3 December 2015.
Source: Matches

=== Results by round ===
Round	1	2	3	4	5	6	7	8	9	10	11	12	13	14
Ground	H	H	A	H	A	A	H	H	H	A	A	A	H	A
Result	W	D	L	L	L	L	D	W	L	W	L	D	L	D

Updated to match(es) played on 3 December 2015. Source: Matches
A = Away; H = Home; W = Win; D = Draw; L = Loss

=== Matches ===
6 October 2015 1	Kerala Blasters	3 – 1	NorthEast United	Kochi
19:00 IST (UTC+5:30)	Carvalho (yellow card) 37'; Josu 49'; Rafi 68'; Watt 71'; Bywater (yellow card) 90+7'	Report	Hanghal (yellow card) 21'; Pradhan (yellow card) 54'; Vélez 82'; Silas (yellow card) 83'	Stadium: Jawaharlal Nehru Stadium; Attendance: 60,017; Referee: Ramaswamy Srikrishna

10 October 2015 2	Kerala Blasters	0 – 0	Mumbai City	Kochi
19:00 IST (UTC+5:30)		Report	Bertin (yellow card) 52'	Stadium: Jawaharlal Nehru Stadium; Attendance: 61,483; Referee: Pranjal Banerjee

13 October 2015 3	Atlético de Kolkata	2 – 1	Kerala Blasters	Kolkata
19:00 IST (UTC+5:30)	Izumi (yellow card) 6'; Lara 53'	Report	Josu (yellow card) 44'; R.Singh (yellow card) 46'; Hossain (yellow card) 63' (yellow-red card) 89'; Dagnall 80'	Stadium: Salt Lake Stadium; Attendance: 61,237

18 October 2015 4	Kerala Blasters	0 – 1	Delhi Dynamos	Kochi
19:00 IST (UTC+5:30)	Vineeth (yellow card) 82'	Report	Gadze 87'	Stadium: Jawaharlal Nehru Stadium; Attendance: 62,087

22 October 2015 5	Goa	2 – 1	Kerala Blasters	Goa
19:00 IST (UTC+5:30)	Sabrosa (yellow card) 40'; Moura 45+1' (yellow card) 89'; Arnolin 83'	Report	Rafi 24'; Williams (yellow card) 44'	Stadium: Fatorda Stadium; Attendance: 18,927

27 October 2015 6	Pune City	3 – 2	Kerala Blasters	Pune
19:00 IST (UTC+5:30)	Uche 16', 23'; Lyngdoh (yellow card) 60'; Tuncay 72'	Report	Rafi 1', 30'	Stadium: Shree Shiv Chhatrapati Sports Complex

31 October 2015 7	Kerala Blasters	1 – 1	Chennaiyin	Kochi
19:00 IST (UTC+5:30)	Dagnall 46'; Perone (red card) 75'	Report	Elano 34' (pen.); M. Wadoo (yellow card) 59'; Mailson (yellow card) 63'	Stadium: Jawaharlal Nehru Stadium; Attendance: 47,852

4 November 2015 8	Kerala Blasters	2 – 0	Pune City	Kochi
19:00 IST (UTC+5:30)	Dagnall 45+1'; Watt 60'; Ahmed (yellow card) 73'	Report	Zokora (yellow card) 59'	Stadium: Jawaharlal Nehru Stadium; Attendance: 40,125

10 November 2015 9	Kerala Blasters	2 – 3	Atlético de Kolkata	Kochi
19:00 IST (UTC+5:30)	German 42' (pen.), 85'; Hossain (yellow card) 52'	Report	Mohanraj 28' (yellow card) 68'; Franco (yellow card) 41'; Izumi 84', 90+3'	Stadium: Jawaharlal Nehru Stadium; Attendance: 60,251

15 November 2015 10	NorthEast United	1 – 4	Kerala Blasters	Guwahati
19:00 IST (UTC+5:30)	López (yellow card) 40'; Hanghal (yellow card) 59'; Vélez 90+1'	Report	Dagnall 1', 76' (yellow card) 59'; Lobo 21'; Bywater (yellow card) 28'; Ramage (yellow card) 31'; Dey (yellow card) 45+3'; German 75'	Stadium: Indira Gandhi Athletic Stadium

21 November 2015 11	Chennaiyin	4 – 1	Kerala Blasters	Chennai
19:00 IST (UTC+5:30)	D.Singh 4' (yellow card) 69'; Mendoza 16', 80', 81'; Blasi (yellow card) 89'	Report	Hossain (yellow card) 69'; German 90'	Stadium: Jawaharlal Nehru Stadium; Attendance: 20,483

26 November 2015 12	Mumbai City	1 – 1	Kerala Blasters	Mumbai
19:00 IST (UTC+5:30)	Subrata Pal (yellow card) 41'; Aguilera 25'; Čmovš (yellow card) 61'; Cristian Bustos (yellow card) 79'	Report	German 88'	Stadium: DY Patil Stadium; Attendance: 25,317

29 November 2015 13	Kerala Blasters	1 – 5	Goa	Kochi
19:00 IST (UTC+5:30)	Pulga 2'; Josu (red card) 45'	Report	Jofre 12'; Reinaldo 29', 50', 61'; Mandar 64'; Léo Moura (yellow card) 82'	Stadium: Jawaharlal Nehru Stadium; Attendance: 32,313

3 December 2015 14	Delhi Dynamos	3 – 3	Kerala Blasters	Delhi
19:00 IST (UTC+5:30)	Marmentini 7'; Nabi 40'; Greene (yellow card) 57'; S.Singh	Report	Dagnall 9'; Coimbra 30'; Jhingan (yellow card) 31'; German 39'; Hossain (yellow card) 48'; Ahmed (yellow card) 75'	Stadium: Jawaharlal Nehru Stadium

== Squad statistics ==
As of Match played 3 December 2015

=== Appearances and goals ===
No.	Pos	Nat	Player	Total		Indian Super League	
No.	Pos	Nat	Player	Apps	Goals	Apps	Goals
2	DF	(India) IND	Rahul Bheke	12	0	11+1	0
4	DF	(India) IND	Ramandeep Singh	1	0	0+1	0
5	DF	(England) ENG	Peter Ramage	14	0	14	0
7	MF	(India) IND	Cavin Lobo	6	1	5+1	1
8	MF	(Portugal) POR	João Coimbra	11	1	6+5	1
11	MF	(India) IND	Ishfaq Ahmed	7	0	2+5	0
12	MF	(India) IND	Shankar Sampingiraj	3	0	2+1	0
13	MF	(India) IND	C.K. Vineeth	9	0	3+6	0
14	MF	(India) IND	Mehtab Hossain	13	0	12+1	0
15	DF	(India) IND	Sandesh Jhingan	10	0	10	0
16	DF	(India) IND	Gurwinder Singh	3	0	2+1	0
17	FW	(India) IND	Manandeep Singh	2	0	2	0
18	DF	(India) IND	Deepak Mondal	2	0	2	0
20	FW	(India) IND	Mohammed Rafi	9	4	7+2	4
21	MF	(England) ENG	Antonio German	9	6	5+4	6
23	DF	(Brazil) BRA	Bruno Perone	10	0	7+3	0
24	GK	(India) IND	Sandip Nandy	2	0	2	0
29	DF	(India) IND	Saumik Dey	8	0	8	0
30	DF	(England) ENG	Marcus Williams	5	0	5	0
43	GK	(England) ENG	Stephen Bywater	12	0	12	0
44	DF	(Brazil) BRA	Rodrigo Arroz	1	0	1	0
66	MF	(India) IND	Peter Carvalho	2	0	2	0
85	MF	(Spain) ESP	Pulga	9	1	6+3	1
99	MF	(Spain) ESP	Josu	11	1	9+2	1
Players who left Kerala Blasters due to injury during the season:
10	FW	(England) ENG	Sanchez Watt	9	2	5+4	2
Players who left Kerala Blasters during the season:
6	DF	(Spain) ESP	Carlos Marchena	1	0	1	0
9	FW	(England) ENG	Chris Dagnall	13	6	13	6

=== Goal scorers ===
Place	Position	Nation	Number	Name	Indian Super League	Total
1	FW	(England)	21	Antonio German	6	6
1	FW	(England)	9	Chris Dagnall	6	6
3	FW	(India)	20	Mohammed Rafi	4	4
4	FW	(England)	10	Sanchez Watt	2	2
5	MF	(Spain)	99	Josu	1	1
5	MF	(India)	7	Cavin Lobo	1	1
5	MF	(Spain)	85	Pulga	1	1
5	MF	(Portugal)	8	João Coimbra	1	1
TOTALS					22	22

=== Disciplinary record ===
Number	Nation	Position	Name	Indian Super League		Total	
Number	Nation	Position	Name	Yellow card	Red card	Yellow card	Red card
4	(India)	DF	Ramandeep Singh	1	0	1	0
5	(England)	DF	Peter Ramage	2	0	1	0
9	(England)	FW	Chris Dagnall	1	0	1	0
11	(India)	MF	Ishfaq Ahmed	2	0	2	0
13	(India)	MF	C.K. Vineeth	1	0	1	0
14	(India)	MF	Mehtab Hossain	5	1	5	1
15	(India)	DF	Sandesh Jhingan	1	0	1	0
23	(Brazil)	DF	Bruno Perone	0	1	0	1
29	(India)	DF	Saumik Dey	1	0	1	0
30	(England)	DF	Marcus Williams	1	0	1	0
43	(England)	GK	Stephen Bywater	2	0	2	0
66	(India)	MF	Peter Carvalho	1	0	1	0
99	(Spain)	MF	Josù	1	1	1	1
			TOTALS	19	3	19	3

== Home Stadium Attendances ==
As of 29 November 2015

Pos	Date	Opponent	Stadium Attendance
1	6 Oct 2015	NorthEast United FC	60,017
2	10 Oct 2015	Mumbai City FC	61,483
3	18 Oct 2015	Delhi Dynamos FC	62,013
4	31 Oct 2015	Chennaiyin FC	47,852
5	4 Nov 2015	FC Pune City	40,125
6	10 Nov 2015	Atlético de Kolkata	60,251
7	29 Nov 2015	FC Goa	32,313
