= 2014 ISL Inaugural Domestic Draft =

ISL Domestic Draft
- Date: 22–23 July 2014
- Location: Mumbai

The 2014 ISL Inaugural Domestic Draft was the first ever draft from the Indian Super League, the new domestic football league in India. The draft featured eighty-four Indian domestic players. They were drafted by six out of the eight teams featured in the Indian Super League to form the domestic core of the teams. NorthEast United FC and Goa were the two non-participating teams as they selected their Indian players from both I-League teams, Dempo and Shillong Lajong respectively. Forty of the eighty-four players up for selection have either played for the India national team or have attended a camp for the national team.

The draft took place within two days, 22 to 23 July, in Mumbai.

== Players available to draft ==
=== Main pool ===
India national team
Player	Last Team	Position	Caps	Goals
Climax Lawrence	Mumbai	MF	72	2
Gouramangi Singh	Rangdajied United	DF	68	5
Syed Nabi	Mohammedan	DF	59	7
Subrata Pal	(Denmark) Vestsjælland	GK	56	0
Renedy Singh	Shillong Lajong	MF	54	4
Steven Dias	Churchill Brothers	MF	51	7
Pappachen Pradeep	Mumbai	MF	41	7
Deepak Mondal	East Bengal	DF	38	0
Anwar Ali	Mumbai	DF	33	0
Mehrajuddin Wadoo	Mohammedan	DF	32	2
Mehtab Hossain	East Bengal	MF	28	2
Sushil Kumar Singh	Shillong Lajong	FW	26	2
Francis Fernandes	Salgaocar	MF	23	0
Raju Gaikwad	East Bengal	DF	22	0
Jeje Lalpekhlua	Dempo	FW	21	8
Lenny Rodrigues	Churchill Brothers	MF	19	0
Sandip Nandy	Mohun Bagan	GK	16	0
Nirmal Chettri	Mohammedan	DF	15	0
Lalrindika Ralte	East Bengal	MF	12	0
Joaquim Abranches	East Bengal	FW	11	1
Denzil Franco	Churchill Brothers	DF	11	0
Arnab Mondal	East Bengal	DF	9	1
Mohammed Rafi	Mumbai	FW	5	1
Rakesh Masih	Mohammedan	DF	5	0
Subhasish Roy Chowdhury	Dempo	GK	4	0
Nallappan Mohanraj	Sporting Goa	DF	4	0
Govin Singh	Shillong Lajong	DF	4	0
Shylo Malsawmtluanga	East Bengal	MF	3	0
Adil Khan	Mohun Bagan	MF	3	0
Sanju Pradhan	Dempo	MF	3	0
Manandeep Singh	Rangdajied United	FW	3	0
Robert Lalthlamuana	East Bengal	DF	2	0
Chinadorai Sabeeth	Mohun Bagan	FW	2	0
Arindam Bhattacharya	Churchill Brothers	GK	1	0
Harmanjot Khabra	East Bengal	MF	1	0
Lester Fernandez	Pune	MF	1	0
Manish Maithani	Mohammedan	MF	1	0
Baljit Sahni	East Bengal	FW	1	0
Balwant Singh	Mohun Bagan	FW	1	0
Ishfaq Ahmed	Mohammedan	MF	—	

Non national team
Player	Last I-League team	Position
Jagroop Singh	Air India	GK
Lalit Thapa	Churchill Brothers	GK
Abhijit Mondal	East Bengal	GK
Luis Barreto	East Bengal	GK
Shilton Paul	Mohun Bagan	GK
Ishan Debnath	United	GK
Ramandeep Singh	Air India	DF
Dharmaraj Ravanan	Churchill Brothers	DF
Naoba Singh	East Bengal	DF
Biswajit Saha	Mohun Bagan	DF
Kingshuk Debnath	Mohun Bagan	DF
Pritam Kotal	Mohun Bagan	DF
Shouvik Ghosh	Mohun Bagan	DF
Khelemba Singh	Mumbai	DF
Peter Costa	Mumbai	DF
Sandesh Jhingan	Mumbai	DF
Avinabo Bag	Pailan Arrows	DF
Munmun Lugun	Rangdajied United	DF
Deepak Devrani	Sporting Goa	DF
Dhanachandra Singh	United	DF
Pratik Shinde	(United States) Houston Hurricanes FC	MF
Anthony Barbosa	Churchill Brothers	MF
Godwin Franco	Dempo	MF
Mohammed Rafique	East Bengal	MF
Denson Devadas	Mohun Bagan	MF
Lalkamal Bhowmick	Mohun Bagan	MF
Lalrin Fela	Mohun Bagan	MF
Manish Bhargav	Mohun Bagan	MF
Ram Malik	Mohun Bagan	MF
Souvik Chakraborty	Mohun Bagan	MF
Ashutosh Mehta	Mumbai	MF
Dane Pereira	Mumbai	MF
Rohit Mirza	Mumbai	MF
Sushanth Mathew	Rangdajied United	MF
Asif Kottayil	United	MF
Snehasish Chakraborty	United	MF
Tapan Maity	United	MF
Jaison Vales	Churchill Brothers	FW
Cavin Lobo	East Bengal	FW
Israil Gurung	Mohammedan	FW
Jayesh Rane	Mumbai	FW
Milagres Gonsalves	Salgaocar	FW
Subhash Singh	Shillong Lajong	FW
Nadong Bhutia	United Sikkim	FW

=== Reserves ===
Player	Last I-League team	Position
Abhra Mondal	East Bengal	GK
Priyant Singh	East Bengal	GK
Abhishek Das	East Bengal	DF
Gurwinder Singh	East Bengal	DF
Saumik Dey	East Bengal	DF
Chingkhei Yumnam	Pailan Arrows	MF
Simranjit Singh	Pailan Arrows	MF
Alvito D'Cunha	East Bengal	FW
Rajinder Kumar	United	FW

== Draft selections – Day 1 ==
=== Round 1 ===
The first round saw FC Pune City go first, with them selecting Lenny Rodrigues as the first ever Indian player in ISL history.

Pick #	ISL team	Player	Position
1	FC Pune City	Lenny Rodrigues	Midfielder
2	Mumbai	Subrata Pal	Goalkeeper
3	Kerala Blasters FC	Mehtab Hossain	Midfielder
4	Chennai	Harmanjot Khabra	Midfielder
5	Atlético de Kolkata	Cavin Lobo	Midfielder
6	Delhi Dynamos FC	Francis Fernandes	Midfielder

=== Round 2 ===
The second round saw Delhi Dynamos FC go first, with them selecting Robert Lalthlamuana as their pick.

Pick #	ISL team	Player	Position
1	Delhi Dynamos FC	Robert Lalthlamuana	Defender
2	Atlético de Kolkata	Arnab Mondal	Defender
3	Chennai	Dhanachandra Singh	Defender
4	Kerala Blasters FC	Sandesh Jhingan	Defender
5	Mumbai	Lalrindika Ralte	Midfielder
6	FC Pune City	Dharmaraj Ravanan	Defender

=== Round 3 ===
The third round saw Kerala Blasters FC pick first. The player they selected was Ishfaq Ahmed.

Pick #	ISL team	Player	Position
1	Kerala Blasters FC	Ishfaq Ahmed	Midfielder
2	Chennai	Jeje Lalpekhlua	Forward
3	Atlético de Kolkata	Denzil Franco	Defender
4	Delhi Dynamos FC	Naoba Singh	Defender
5	FC Pune City	Ashutosh Mehta	Forward
6	Mumbai	Syed Nabi	Defender

=== Round 4 ===
The fourth round saw Mumbai pick first, their pick being Raju Gaikwad.

Pick #	ISL team	Player	Position
1	Mumbai	Raju Gaikwad	Defender
2	FC Pune City	Joaquim Abranches	Forward
3	Delhi Dynamos FC	Shylo Malsawmtluanga	Midfielder
4	Atlético de Kolkata	Rakesh Masih	Midfielder
5	Chennai	Gouramangi Singh	Defender
6	Kerala Blasters FC	Gurwinder Singh	Defender

=== Round 5 ===
The fifth round saw Chennai pick first. They selected Shilton Paul with their pick.

Pick #	ISL team	Player	Position
1	Chennai	Shilton Paul	Goalkeeper
2	Kerala Blasters FC	Nirmal Chettri	Defender
3	Mumbai	Subhash Singh	Forward
4	FC Pune City	Pritam Kotal	Defender
5	Delhi Dynamos FC	Shouvik Ghosh	Defender
6	Atlético de Kolkata	Mohammed Rafique	Forward

=== Round 6 ===
The sixth round saw Atlético de Kolkata pick first. They selected Mohammed Rafi with their pick.

Pick #	ISL team	Player	Position
1	Atlético de Kolkata	Mohammed Rafi	Forward
2	Delhi Dynamos FC	Souvik Chakraborty	Midfielder
3	FC Pune City	Manish Maithani	Midfielder
4	Mumbai	Ram Malik	Midfielder
5	Kerala Blasters FC	Sushanth Mathew	Midfielder
6	Chennai	Denson Devadas	Midfielder

=== Round 7 ===
The sixth round saw FC Pune City pick first. They selected Israil Gurung with their pick.

Pick #	ISL team	Player	Position
1	FC Pune City	Israil Gurung	Forward
2	Mumbai	Deepak Mondal	Defender
3	Kerala Blasters FC	Godwin Franco	Midfielder
4	Chennai	Khelemba Singh	Defender
5	Atlético de Kolkata	Biswajit Saha	Defender
6	Delhi Dynamos FC	Munmun Lugun	Defender

== Draft selections – Day 2 ==
=== Round 8 ===
The first round of the second day and the eighth round overall began with Delhi Dynamos FC drafting Adil Khan.

Pick #	ISL team	Player	Position
1	Delhi Dynamos FC	Adil Khan	Midfielder
2	Atlético de Kolkata	Sanju Pradhan	Midfielder
3	Chennai	Abhishek Das	Defender
4	Kerala Blasters FC	Avinabo Bag	Defender
5	Mumbai	Rohit Mirza	Midfielder
6	FC Pune City	Deepak Devrani	Defender

=== Round 9 ===
The second round of the second day and the ninth round overall began with Kerala Blasters FC drafting Sandip Nandy.

Pick #	ISL team	Player	Position
1	Kerala Blasters FC	Sandip Nandy	Goalkeeper
2	Chennai	Jayesh Rane	Forward
3	Atlético de Kolkata	Kingshuk Debnath	Defender
4	Delhi Dynamos FC	Manish Bhargav	Midfielder
5	FC Pune City	Tapan Maity	Midfielder
6	Mumbai	Ishan Debnath	Goalkeeper

=== Round 10 ===
The third round of the second day and the tenth round overall began with Mumbai drafting Nadong Bhutia.

Pick #	ISL team	Player	Position
1	Mumbai	Nadong Bhutia	Forward
2	FC Pune City	Arindam Bhattacharya	Goalkeeper
3	Delhi Dynamos FC	Govin Singh	Defender
4	Atlético de Kolkata	Lester Fernandez	Midfielder
5	Chennai	Abhijit Mondal	Goalkeeper
6	Kerala Blasters FC	Chinadorai Sabeeth	Forward

=== Round 11 ===
The fourth round of the second day and the eleventh round overall began with Chennai drafting Anthony Barbosa.

Pick #	ISL team	Player	Position
1	Chennai	Anthony Barbosa	Midfielder
2	Kerala Blasters FC	Luis Barreto	Goalkeeper
3	Mumbai	Asif Kottayil	Midfielder
4	FC Pune City	Anupam Sarkar	Defender
5	Delhi Dynamos FC	Jagroop Singh	Goalkeeper
6	Atlético de Kolkata	Subhasish Roy Chowdhury	Goalkeeper

=== Round 12 ===
The fifth round of the second day and the twelfth round overall began with Atlético de Kolkata drafting Baljit Sahni.

Pick #	ISL team	Player	Position
1	Atlético de Kolkata	Baljit Sahni	Forward
2	Delhi Dynamos FC	Steven Dias	Midfielder
3	FC Pune City	Pratik Shinde	Midfielder
4	Mumbai	Peter Costa	Defender
5	Kerala Blasters FC	Milagres Gonsalves	Forward
6	Chennai	Dane Pereira	Midfielder

=== Round 13 ===
The sixth round of the second day and the thirteenth round overall began with Atlético de Kolkata drafting Climax Lawrence.

Pick #	ISL team	Player	Position
1	Atlético de Kolkata	Climax Lawrence	Midfielder
2	Delhi Dynamos FC	Anwar Ali	Defender
3	FC Pune City	Lalit Thapa	Goalkeeper
4	Mumbai	Lalrin Fela	Midfielder
5	Kerala Blasters FC	Ramandeep Singh	Defender
6	Chennai	Pappachen Pradeep	Midfielder

=== Round 14 ===
The seventh round of the second day and the fourteenth round overall began with Chennai drafting Jaison Vales.

Pick #	ISL team	Player	Position
1	Chennai	Jaison Vales	Midfielder
2	Kerala Blasters FC	Renedy Singh	Midfielder
3	Mumbai	Sushil Kumar Singh	Forward
4	FC Pune City	Mehrajuddin Wadoo	Midfielder
5	Delhi Dynamos FC	Manandeep Singh	Forward
6	Atlético de Kolkata	Nallappan Mohanraj	Defender

== Goa and North East United ==
Due to both FC Goa and NorthEast United FC technically not being a part of the official draft, the two teams were placed at the bottom for every round to select their one player from Dempo and Shillong Lajong, respectively, from the I-League.

Round #	Goa player	Position	North East United player	Position
1	Laxmikant Kattimani	Goalkeeper	Kunzang Bhutia	Goalkeeper
2	Debabrata Roy	Defender	Jibon Singh	Defender
3	Gabriel Fernandes	Midfielder	Durga Boro	Forward
4	Clifford Miranda	Midfielder	Aiborlang Khongjee	Defender
5	Jewel Raja	Midfielder	Zohmingliana Ralte	Defender
6	Alwyn George	Midfielder	Rehnesh TP	Goalkeeper
7	Narayan Das	Defender	Boithang Haokip	Midfielder
8	Mandar Rao Desai	Midfielder	Pritam Kumar Singh	Defender
9	Romeo Fernandes	Midfielder	Milan Singh	Midfielder
10	Peter Carvalho	Midfielder	Robin Gurung	Defender
11	Holicharan Narzary	Forward	Alen Deory	Midfielder
12	Pronay Halder	Midfielder	Redeem Tlang	Midfielder
13	Prabir Das	Defender	Seminlen Doungel	Forward
14	Rowilson Rodrigues	Defender	David Ngaihte	Midfielder
