= History of Kerala Blasters FC =

Detailed history of Kerala Blasters Football Club

The History of Kerala Blasters FC goes from the club's founding in 2014 and its season by season performance up to current time. Kerala Blasters FC, also known simply as The Blasters is based in Kochi, Kerala, India. The Blasters are one of the most widely supported clubs in Asia and have one of the largest social media following among the football clubs from the continent. This article gives a brief history about the club since its inception to the present.

== Formation ==
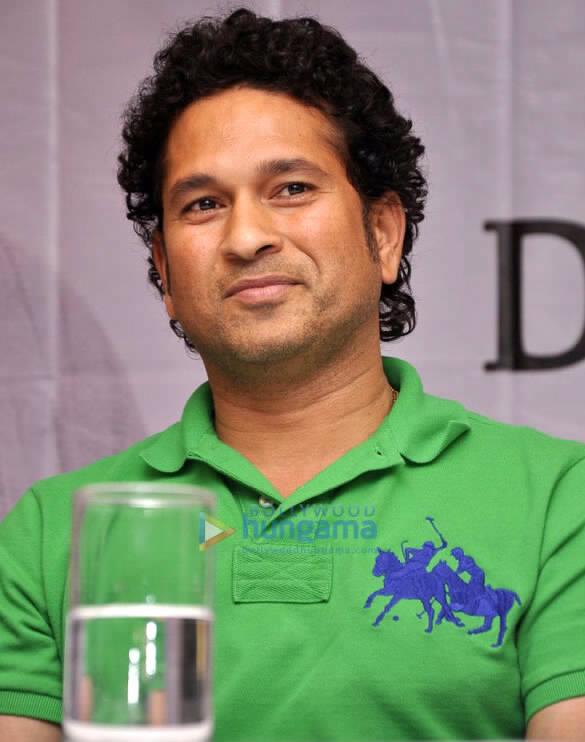
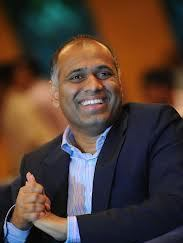
Sachin Tendulkar and Prasad V Potluri were the first owners of the club

In early 2014, the All India Football Federation—the governing body of association football in India, announced they would accept bids for the ownership of eight franchises from selected cities for the inaugural season of Indian Super League (ISL). On 13 April 2014, it was announced the rights to the Kochi franchise had been won by former India national cricket team captain Sachin Tendulkar and entrepreneur Prasad V Potluri. On 27 May 2014, the club's official name, Kerala Blasters FC, was announced; it is because the club represents not only Kochi, but the whole Kerala's passion towards football. The name Blasters was based on the nickname of Tendulkar, who was known as Master Blaster during his playing days.

Preparations for the first season started on 22 July when the Kerala Blasters took part in the first domestic draft to select fourteen Indian players. Indian international Mehtab Hossain was the first choice made by the club. The management also selected Avinabo Bag, Sandip Nandy, Chinadorai Sabeeth, Luis Barreto, Milagres Gonsalves, Ramandeep Singh, Renedy Singh, Sandesh Jhingan, Ishfaq Ahmed, Gurwinder Singh, Nirmal Chettri, Sushanth Mathew, and Godwin Franco for their inaugural season. As a mandatory rule, ISL clubs had to sign one internationally reputed player as a marquee signing. On 13 August 2014, former England international goalkeeper David James was chosen as the first head coach and marquee player of the team. On 21 August 2014, the club participated in the international draft; the management selected seven foreign players for the team. Michael Chopra, Iain Hume, Pulga, Erwin Spitzner, Pedro Gusmão, Cedric Hengbart and Raphaël Romey were the seven foreign players drafted to Kerala Blasters. Along with them, the club directly signed Penn Orji, Jamie McAllister, Andrew Barisic, Stephen Pearson and Colin Falvey in the remaining foreign players slots.

== Inaugural season ==
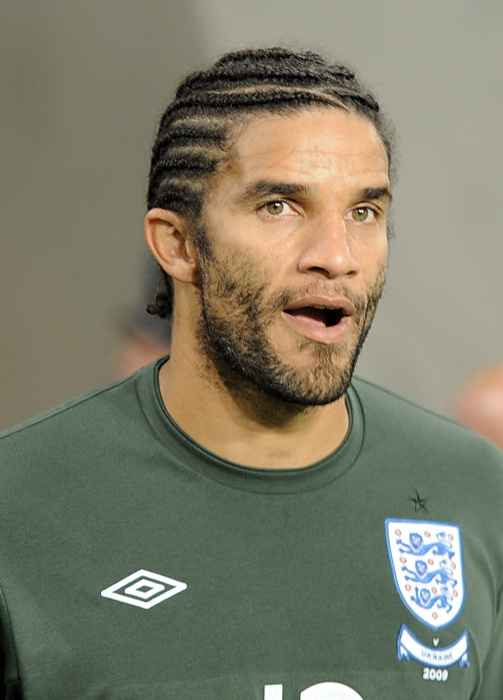
David James was the first manager and marquee player of the club

Kerala Blasters played their first game on 13 October 2014 against NorthEast United at the Indira Gandhi Athletic Stadium; they lost the game 1–0 after Koke scored in the 45th minute. On 21 October, the club's first-ever goal was scored by Iain Hume during their second match, which was against Chennaiyin. Despite Hume's goal, the Blasters lost the game 2–1. The Blasters first win came in their fourth game, which was played against Pune City; Chinadorai Sabeeth and Penn Orji scored the club's goals, leading to a 2–1 victory. After playing their first five matches away from home, Kerala Blasters hosted their first home match on 6 November 2014 against Goa. A goal by Milagres Gonsalves led to a 1–0 victory in front of 49,517 fans at the Jawaharlal Nehru Stadium (Kochi). The Blasters qualified for the playoffs on 9 December 2014 with a 1–0 victory over Pune City.

After finishing in fourth place during the regular season, the side played their first semi-finals match on 13 December 2014 against Chennaiyin. Despite not being considered the favourite to win the two-legged tie, they won the first leg at home 3–0 with goals from Ishfaq Ahmed, Iain Hume, and Sushanth Mathew. During the second leg in Chennai, the Blasters were about to suffer a massive setback. Despite entering the second leg with a three-goal advantage, Chennaiyin drew the tie level by winning in regular time 3–0. In extra time, however, Stephen Pearson scored the decisive goal in the 117th minute to win the tie 4–3 to enter the final.

2014 Indian Super League final starting lineup

In the final, Kerala Blasters played ATK at the DY Patil Stadium in Mumbai. Hume should have given Blasters the lead after 55 minutes, but he took too long alone in front of the goalkeeper, allowing the defenders to eventually block his shot. The match was destined to go to extra time until ATK were given a corner kick in the last minute, and headed the ball at the near post. As a result, the Blasters lost the match 1–0 despite dominating it throughout the 90 minutes.

== 2015 season ==
After the 2014 season, the club announced David James would not return to the club as the head coach and marquee player, and on 12 May 2015, it was confirmed that former England Under-20 head coach Peter Taylor would take over the manager role at the club. New signings for the season included Peter Ramage, Stephen Bywater, Bruno Perone, Sanchez Watt, João Coimbra, Josu, Mohammed Rafi and Carlos Marchena as the marquee signing.

The first match of the season was played at the Jawaharlal Nehru Stadium against NorthEast United where the Blasters won 3–1 with goals from Josu, Mohammed Rafi, and Sanchez Watt. They drew their next match against Mumbai City and then lost their next four matches, which led to the dismissal of Peter Taylor as head coach. Assistant coach Trevor Morgan was in charge for one match before Terry Phelan was named as the head coach for the rest of the season. After playing just one match in the league, Carlos Marchena also left the club for personal reasons. Under Phelan, the Blasters managed to get two wins and three draws in the last seven games of the season. They ended their second season in the last place of the league table.

== 2016 season ==
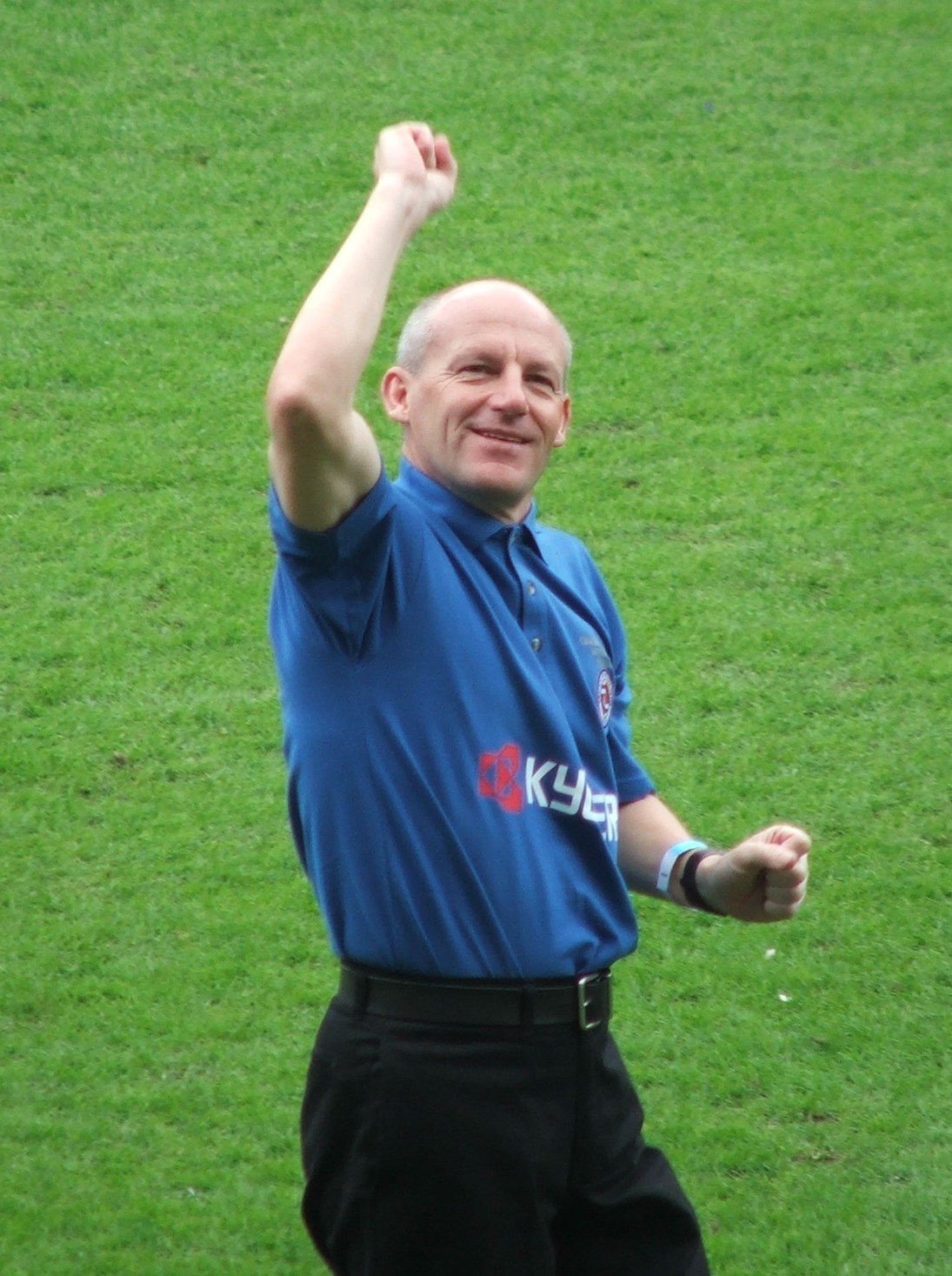
Steve Coppell led the Blasters into the 2016 ISL finals.

In an effort to rebuild the team after failing to qualify for the semi-finals in the previous season, the Blasters announced the signing of former Crystal Palace manager Steve Coppell as their head coach on 21 June 2016. A week later, the club announced the signing of Northern Ireland international Aaron Hughes as their marquee player for the season. Other signings for the season included Graham Stack, Kervens Belfort, Duckens Nazon, and Mohammed Rafique along with the return of former players Michael Chopra and Cédric Hengbart.

The season began with a 1–0 defeat away from home against NorthEast United. The Blasters struggled early in the season, as they failed to score goals. After the return of C.K. Vineeth from his loan-spell with Bengaluru FC, Blasters solved their goal-scoring issue. He scored four goals from his first five matches which includes a winner against FC Goa and a brace over Chennaiyin FC. In order to qualify for semi-final, Blasters needed to avoid a defeat against North East United FC. Vineeth's only goal in the 66th minute helped Blasters to beat North East United 1–0 to seal the second place behind Mumbai City FC in the league table.

2016 Indian Super League final starting lineup

After finishing in second place during the regular season, the Blasters played third-placed Delhi Dynamos in the first leg of the semi-finals, which took place in Kochi. The Blasters won the match 1–0 through Kervens Belfort's 65th-minute goal. During the second leg in Delhi, the Dynamos won in extra time 2–1, which meant the scores became tie on aggregate and the match went to penalty shootout where the Blasters won it 3–0 to enter the final. In the final, the Blasters played host to ATK and got the lead early through Mohammed Rafi before ATK equalized soon after and the match went into a penalty shootout. Despite taking the lead early in the shootout, the Blasters lost 4–3; it was their second finals defeat in three seasons.

== 2017–18 season ==
After losing in the previous season's finals, Steve Coppell rejected a new contract extension so the club appointed former Manchester United assistant manager René Meulensteen as their new manager. Blasters released all of their foreign players and signed some new players, including former Manchester United players Dimitar Berbatov and Wes Brown. Sandesh Jhingan was appointed as the captain and the club re-signed their leading goalscorer from the first season Iain Hume. The Blasters won only one of their first eight games that season, leading to the sacking of Meulensteen. Fan-favourite manager David James returned to the squad as caretaker. Midfielder Victor Pulga was brought back into the squad as a replacement for the injured Kizito Keziron during the mid-season. The club also signed the Icelandic striker Guðjón Baldvinsson as a replacement for Mark Sifneos, who left the club to join FC Goa. Berbatov was mainly employed as a midfielder in most of the matches and were only able to score one goal during the entire season. The Blasters won five of the remaining ten matches and finished sixth in the 2017–18 Indian Super League. After criticising David James of poor tactics, Berbatov left the club, even when the Super Cup was remaining. The Blasters announced their squad for Super Cup with only five foreigners in their squad and were eliminated in the first round of the tournament.

== 2018–19 season ==
Having failed to qualify for the previous season's semi-finals, the Blasters signed a three-year deal with manager David James. Among the foreigners, Nemanja Lakić-Pešić, Courage Pekuson and Kizito Keziron were retained. Along with them, Slavisa Stojanovic, Matej Poplatnik, Cyril Kali and Nikola Krčmarević were recruited as new foreign signings. On 29 September 2018, the Blasters played their first game of the season against ATK, where they won 2–0. The Blasters had consecutive draws in their next four games, followed by three consecutive defeats. During the season, Sahal Abdul Samad established himself as Blasters' mainstay in midfield. The club had one of their worst season ever, won only one and drawn six of their twelve fixtures, leading to the sacking of James. After the international mid-season break, the Blasters appointed Nelo Vingada as their new manager for the remaining six matches. Of the remaining games, the team had only one win and three draws, and finished ninth in the league. They were eliminated from the Super Cup in the qualifying round of the tournament.

== 2019–20 season ==
After a disappointing season, the Blasters appointed Eelco Schattorie as their new manager. The club released all of their foreign players and signed a new roster that included Cameroon-born Raphaël Messi Bouli and former Nigeria international Bartholomew Ogbeche as forwards. Blasters beat their arch-rivals ATK on the season's first day. Throughout the season, the team was hit by injury concerns. Defender Sandesh Jhingan, who captained the club for the last two seasons, was out of action with an ACL injury and newly signed Brazilian defender Jairo Rodrigues was also injured. Both defenders missed the entire season and Rodrigues played a few matches in the start. Gianni Zuiverloon and Mario Arqués and other players were also hit by minor injuries in the season; they missed some of the crucial fixtures. After the victory against ATK in the opening game, the team were not able to find win in the next eight games. On 5 January 2020, they ended their winless run by defeating Hyderabad FC 5–1. This was also the club's largest victory in their history until that date. On 15 January 2020, the Blasters defeated their southern rivals Bengaluru FC for the first time ever in the South Indian Derby. After a 4–4 draw in their final game of the season against Odisha FC on 23 February 2020, the Blasters finished the season in seventh place in the table. This match against Odisha was the highest scoring draw in the history of Indian Super League.

== 2020–21 season ==
From the 2020–21 season onwards, the management decided to build a new strategy at the club. As a part of this, the Blasters appointed Karolis Skinkys as their new sporting director on 15 March 2020. On 22 April 2020, the club officially announced the appointment of Kibu Vicuña as their new manager. Fan-favourite defender Sandesh Jhingan left the club on 21 May 2020 by mutual consent, ending his six-year association with the Blasters along with CEO Viren D'Silva who also left the club the same day itself.

As a part of their new philosophy, the Blasters decided to rely more upon young Indian players and extended the contracts of Sahal and Rahul KP until 2025. They signed Nishu Kumar on a four-year deal from Bengaluru FC. Givson Singh, who performed well for the Indian Arrows the previous season was signed on a three-year deal. Puitea, Rohit Kumar, Ritwik Das, and Prabhsukhan Gill were the other major signings for the season. For the first time in the club's history, six players were promoted from the reserves into the senior team in a season. While developing a squad of young players, the club also extended the contract of senior player Jessel Carneiro until 2023. The Blasters only extended the contract of Sergio Cido among the foreign players and signed a new roster of them under the supervision of the new sporting director. Facundo Pereyra, Costa Nhamoinesu, and Bakary Koné were signed for a one-year deal while Vicente Gómez was signed on a performance based three-year deal. They fulfilled the AFC player quota by signing Jordan Murray.

Due to COVID-19 pandemic, the seventh season of ISL were decided to took place in 3 venues in Goa behind the closed doors. The Blasters started their season with a 1–0 against ATK Mohun Bagan on 20 November 2020. Same as in the previous season, the team suffered an early setback, with this time, captain Sergio Cidoncha suffering a ligament injury on his right ankle during their third match against Chennaiyin FC, ruling out for the remainder of the season. It took the Blasters seven games to register their first victory of the season, winning against Hyderabad FC 2–0. The team were affected by injuries, lesser compared to the previous season. The Blasters registered their second win against Jamshedpur FC after which they were undefeated for the next 4 games. They signed Juande as a replacement for Cido in the January transfer window. In late January, Facundo Pereyra broke his nose during training and missed the remainder of the season. Sandeep Singh was deployed in the right back position for the injured Nishu and the young defensive midfielder Jeakson Singh was deployed as a centre-back for five consecutive games. The Blasters lost 18 points from winning position, which includes 4 losses after taking the early lead. The club had the worst defensive performance in their history conceding 33 goals in 18 games and had only 3 wins. On 17 February 2021, after a 4–0 loss against Hyderabad FC on 16 February, Kibu Vicuna and the management decided to part ways on mutual consent. Assistant manager Ishfaq Ahmed was appointed as the interim head coach for the remaining 2 games of the season. The club's fortunes remained largely unchanged in the season as they finished tenth place in the league table.

== 2021–22 season ==
After another disappointing season, the club appointed Ivan Vukomanović as their head coach on 17 June 2021. The club brought in a series of new foreign players, as well as the domestic players from the summer transfer window. The Blasters started their pre-season camp in July 2021, and played the most number of friendlies across all ISL clubs prior to the season. In the month of August, the Blasters confirmed their participation in the 2021 Durand Cup, competing in the tournament for the first time in their history. After three league stage matches, the Blasters were knocked out of the tournament, following their defeat over Delhi FC on 22 September. On 19 November, the Blasters played their first match of the 2021–22 Indian Super League against ATK Mohun Bagan, which they lost 4–2. The club won their first match of the season by defeating Odisha on 5 December by 2–1. This victory was Kerala Blasters' first ISL victory in 11 months. Breaching of coronavirus in the Kerala Blasters camp in Goa led to the postponement of two of their matches in January 2022. Following their defeat over ATK Mohun Bagan in the opening match of the season, the Blasters went unbeaten for the next 10 games, until they were beaten by the southern rivals Bengaluru on 30 January. In between the unbeaten run, the Blasters moved to the top spot in league table for the first time in 7 years during the middle of the season. After Mumbai City lost against Hyderabad on 6 March, the Blasters qualified for the playoffs for the first time since the 2016 season. When the regular phase of the season ended, Vukomanović's Blasters side broke many club records in terms of the number of wins, total number of goals and clean-sheets, points-per-game, and achieved a positive goal difference for the first time in the club's history.

2022 Indian Super League final starting lineup

With the Blasters winning 2–1 on aggregate against Jamshedpur from both the semi-finals, the Blasters qualified for the finals of the ISL for the third time in their history. They met Hyderabad in the final on 20 March, which they lost in the penalty shoot-out after the Blasters' early lead though Rahul KP was equalised by Hyderabad in the last moments of the regular ninety minutes of the game. It was the club's third defeat in an Indian Super League final match.

== 2022–23 season ==
After an impressive season, in April 2022, Kerala Blasters renewed the contract of the head coach Ivan Vukomanović till 2025. It was the first time that the club has renewed the contract of a first-team head coach in its history. Even though the Blasters' pre-season preparations in the UAE were interrupted by the FIFA ban on AIFF, the club sent their reserve team for the 2022 Durand Cup, in which they reached the quarter-finals but were knocked out by Mohammedan SC from the tournament. The club only retained Marko Lešković and Adrián Luna as their foreigner players from the previous season, as the rest of the foreigners left the club.

They played the opening match of the season on 7 October against East Bengal FC, which they won 3–1. Even though the Blasters lost their next three games, they recovered from the bad run and went on an eight match unbeaten streak and five consecutive wins for the first time in their history in this season. By the end of the season, the Blasters won ten of their twenty league stage matches, which became a club record, and ended up 5th in the table and qualified for the playoffs. The Blasters met arch-rivals Bengaluru FC in the first knockout stage match in a new format for the ISL playoffs. The match that took place on 3 March is known for the controversial Sunil Chhetri's goal and walk-off by the Kerala Blasters players. Ivan Vukomanović called-off the Blasters players from the pitch into the dressing room after the referee gave green light to the Sunil Chhetri's free-kick goal for Bengaluru in the extra-time, which the Blasters players and staff deemed illegitimate citing that the Blasters players did not set themselves in their defensive positions prior to the free-kick was taken. Bengaluru was awarded the win, and the Blasters appealed to the federation for the match to be replayed and demanded for the match referee Crystal John to banned from refereeing. The AIFF disciplinary committee rejected the Blasters' appeal and imposed a fine of rupees four crores on the Blasters for abandoning the match and asked them to issue a public apology within a week, failing which they would be obliged to pay a fine of rupees six crores, and Vukomanović was handed a ten-match ban by the AIFF-DC from taking part in any AIFF held tournaments along with a fine of rupees five lakhs, and directed him to issue a public apology within a week as well, failing which the fine would be doubled to rupees ten lakhs. The club and Vukomanović then issued their apologies and 'regrets' as demanded by the AIFF-DC, giving a dramatic end to their ISL campaign.

Kerala Blasters also took part in the 2023 Indian Super Cup, which took place in Kozhikode after the end of the ISL season in April 2023. They won their first group stage match of the tournament against RoundGlass Punjab FC on 8 April by 3–1. Even though they won the first match, they lost their next match against Sreenidi Deccan FC by 2–0. They played Bengaluru FC in a must-win match from Group A on 16 April, but the match ended in a 1–1 draw, and the Blasters were eliminated from the tournament, as they ended yet another season without a silverware.

== 2023–24 season ==
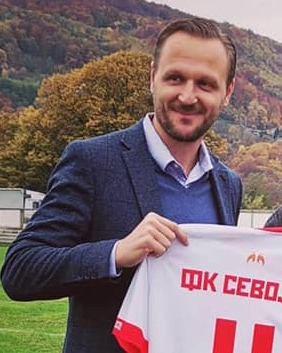
During his three years at the club, coach Ivan Vukomanović took the Blasters to three consecutive playoffs; leading them to the 2022 ISL Final.

The Kerala Blasters underwent significant changes following the 2022–23 season. The club parted ways with assistant coach Ishfaq Ahmed after four years, and saw captain Jessel Carneiro move to Bengaluru FC. Indian midfielder Sahal Abdul Samad also departed, transferring to Mohun Bagan Super Giant in a swap deal involving Pritam Kotal, with a transfer fee of ₹90 lakhs. The Blasters made their most expensive signing by paying FC Goa ₹1.45 crores for Aibanbha Dohling on a three-year contract. However, they retained key foreign players Dimitrios Diamantakos, Adrián Luna, and Marko Lešković for the new season. The Blasters began the 2023–24 season with the 2023 Durand Cup, drawn in Group C with rivals Bengaluru FC. Their campaign started on 13 August 2023 with a 3–4 loss to Gokulam Kerala FC. Despite a record 5–0 win over Indian Navy FT in their final group stage match, the Blasters were eliminated, finishing third in the group with four points.

Ahead of the league matches, the Blasters made several new foreign signings, including Miloš Drinčić, Kwame Peprah, and Daisuke Sakai. They won their opening match against Bengaluru FC 2–1 on 21 September. Coach Ivan Vukomanović, who had been serving a ten-match ban due to a walk-out incident from the previous season’s playoffs, returned on 27 October for a 2–1 comeback win against Odisha FC. During this match, Adrián Luna became the joint all-time top scorer of the club alongside Bartholomew Ogbeche. The team experienced an injury crisis, with midfielder Freddy Lallawmawma sidelined for a significant part of the season due to a bike accident. Diamantakos scored a brace against Chennaiyin FC in November, becoming the club’s all-time top scorer with 16 goals across all competitions.

The Blasters faced further challenges as captain Luna was injured midway through the season but returned for the league playoffs in April 2024. During this season, the Blasters secured their first-ever win against Mohun Bagan Super Giant in their final match of 2023. After the winter break, the Blasters competed in the 2024 Indian Super Cup, starting with a 3–1 victory over Shillong Lajong FC on 10 January. However, they were disqualified after two additional losses in the group stage.

The second phase of the league resumed after the Super Cup. The Blasters, dealing with injuries, returned on 2 February and lost 2–1 to Odisha. They won only two of their remaining ten league matches (against FC Goa and Hyderabad FC), ending the regular season in 5th place with 33 points and qualifying for the league playoffs for the third consecutive time. In the playoffs, the Blasters faced Odisha away on 19 April 2024. After a goalless first half, Fedor Černych scored for the Blasters, but Odisha equalized late and won in extra time, eliminating the Blasters with a 2–1 scoreline. By the end of the season, the Blasters had over a dozen injuries in their squad throughout the season, as the Blasters ended their 2023–24 season without a silverware.

Despite the season's difficulties, striker Dimitrios Diamantakos topped the league’s goal-scoring charts with 13 goals in 17 games and won the league's Golden Boot. On 26 April, the club announced the departure of coach Ivan Vukomanović after his three-year tenure at the club.
