= 2014 Kerala Blasters FC season =

1st season in existence of Kerala Blasters FC

Kerala Blasters FC
2014 season
- General manager: Prasanth Agarwal
- Head coach: David James
- Stadium: Jawaharlal Nehru Stadium
- ISL: 4th
- ISL Playoffs: Runners-up
- Top goalscorer: League: Iain Hume (4); All: Iain Hume (5)
- Highest home attendance: 61,323 vs. Chennaiyin (30 November)
- Lowest home attendance: 34,657 vs. Delhi Dynamos (9 November)
- Average home league attendance: 49,111
Home colours	Away colours

The 2014 season was the first ever season in Kerala Blasters Football Club's existence after its establishment in May 2014, as well as their first season in the inaugural season of Indian Super League. The club managed to secure qualification for the Indian Super League playoffs on 9 December 2014, after finishing the regular season in fourth position. They managed to make it to the final, but were defeated by Atlético de Kolkata through a stoppage time goal.

The Blasters signed the former England international, David James, as their first ever coach in August. They also drafted in India internationals such as Mehtab Hossain, Sandip Nandy, Chinadorai Sabeeth, Renedy Singh, Ishfaq Ahmed, and Nirmal Chettri. The Blasters have selected an international foreign player, Canadian international Iain Hume, before signing on former Scottish internationals Jamie McAllister and Stephen Pearson outside the draft.

After starting the season with five straight away games, the Blasters found themselves with only four points. Once the team started playing home games they gained 11 points from the next five games. Another 4 points from their final four games were enough for the team to qualify for the finals. The finals started off very well for Kerala Blasters as they defeated Chennaiyin 3–0 at home in the first leg of the semi-finals. Despite giving up that lead in the second-leg, an extra-time goal from Stephen Pearson ensured that the Blasters qualified for the final. In the final, the club were defeated 1–0 by Atlético de Kolkata through a last-minute strike by Mohammed Rafique.

== Background ==
In early 2014, it was announced that the All India Football Federation, the national federation for football in India, and IMG–Reliance would be accepting bids for ownership of eight of the nine selected cities for the inaugural Indian Super League (ISL), a franchise tournament modelled along the lines of the Indian Premier League for cricket. On 13 April 2014 it was announced that the rights to the Kerala franchise were won by former India cricket captain, Sachin Tendulkar, and serial entrepreneur, philanthropist, and educationalist, Prasad V Potluri. Then, on 27 May 2014, the team's official name was unveiled as 'Kerala Blasters FC' which is based on the nickname of co-owner Sachin Tendular, 'Master Blaster'.

Selection of the players for the first season started on 22 July when the Blasters, along with the other seven franchises, took part in the domestic draft to select the first fourteen Indian players in each team. India international Mehtab Hossain was the first draft pick made by Kerala Blasters and thus the first player in Kerala Blasters history. At the end of the draft, the Blasters were composed of fourteen players, including Hossain: Avinabo Bag, Sandip Nandy, Chinadorai Sabeeth, Luis Barreto, Milagres Gonsalves, Ramandeep Singh, Renedy Singh, Ishfaq Ahmed, Gurwinder Singh, Nirmal Chettri, Sushanth Mathew, and Godwin Franco.

On 13 August 2014, former England international goalkeeper, David James was announced as the first head coach of the club and the first marquee player in team history, thus coming in as a player-head coach. Then, on 21 August 2014, the team participated in the international draft in which each team selected seven foreign players to join their team. Former Newcastle United forward Michael Chopra was the first foreign player drafted by the Blasters.

=== Signings ===
==== Indian draft ====
Round	Position	Player	I-League club
1	MF	(India) Mehtab Hossain	East Bengal
2	DF	(India) Sandesh Jhingan	Mumbai FC
3	MF	(India) Ishfaq Ahmed	Mohammedan
4	DF	(India) Gurwinder Singh	East Bengal
5	DF	(India) Nirmal Chettri	Mohammedan
6	MF	(India) Sushanth Mathew	Rangdajied United
7	MF	(India) Godwin Franco	Dempo
8	DF	(India) Avinabo Bag	Pailan Arrows
9	GK	(India) Sandip Nandy	Mohun Bagan
10	FW	(India) Chinadorai Sabeeth	Mohun Bagan
11	GK	(India) Luis Barreto	East Bengal
12	FW	(India) Milagres Gonsalves	Salgaocar
13	DF	(India) Ramandeep Singh	Air India
14	MF	(India) Renedy Singh	Shillong Lajong

==== International draft ====
Round	Position	Player	Last Club
1	FW	(England) Michael Chopra	(England) Blackpool
2	FW	(Canada) Iain Hume	(England) Fleetwood Town
3	MF	(Spain) Pulga	(Greece) Kallithea
4	DF	(Brazil) Erwin Spitzner	(Brazil) Atlético Paranaense
5	FW	(Brazil) Pedro Gusmão	(Brazil) Atlético Paranaense
6	DF	(France) Cedric Hengbart	(France) Ajaccio
7	DF	(France) Raphaël Romey	(France) Bastia

==== Other signings ====
No.	Position	Player	Last club	Date	Ref
70	GK	(England) David James	(Iceland) ÍBV Vestmannaeyjar	13 August 2014	
3	DF	(Scotland) Jamie McAllister	(England) Yeovil Town	23 August 2014	
18	MF	(Nigeria) Penn Orji	(India) Mohammedan	1 September 2014	
27	FW	(Australia) Andrew Barisic	(Hong Kong) South China	1 September 2014	
25	MF	(Scotland) Stephen Pearson	(England) Bristol City	1 September 2014	
32	DF	(Republic of Ireland) Colin Falvey	(United States) Charleston Battery	4 September 2014	
29	DF	(India) Saumik Dey	(India) East Bengal	7 September 2014	
13	MF	(India) Duleep Menon	(India) Central Excise	27 September 2014	

== Pre-season ==
18 September 2014 Friendly	Kerala Blasters	5–1	Kerala Police FC	Thrissur
	Sabeeth (2 goals); Chopra (2 goals)	Report		Stadium: Thrissur Municipal Corporation Stadium

24 September 2014 Friendly	Kerala Blasters	6–0	Sree Kerala Varma College	Thrissur
		Report		Stadium: Thrissur Municipal Corporation Stadium

25 September 2014 Friendly	Kerala Blasters	5–0	Central Excise	Thrissur
		Report		Stadium: Thrissur Municipal Corporation Stadium

27 September 2014 Friendly	Kerala Blasters	1–0	Mohammedan	Thrissur
		Report		Stadium: Thrissur Municipal Corporation Stadium

3 October 2014 Friendly	Vasco	0–4	Kerala Blasters	Goa
		Report

5 October 2014 Friendly	Cavelossim	1–4	Kerala Blasters	Goa
		Report

7 October 2014 Friendly	Churchill Brothers	0–1	Kerala Blasters	Goa
		Report

9 October 2014 Friendly	Salgaocar	1–2	Kerala Blasters	Goa
		Report

== Indian Super League ==
Kerala Blasters began their first ever season away from home against NorthEast United on 13 October. A goal from Koke lead to the Blasters losing that match 1–0 to open the season. Their second match was no better as the Blasters lost their second match of the season to Chennaiyin 2–1. Despite Canadian international Iain Hume scoring the first goal in Blasters history, Chennaiyin managed to grab the victory through goals from Elano and Bernard Mendy. The winless streak continued for Kerala Blasters as they headed into their third match against Atlético de Kolkata. An equalizer from Iain Hume meant that the Blasters managed to draw the match 1–1 and thus earn their first ever point. The draw helped propel the momentum for the Blasters as they ended their first month of competitive football with their first ever victory against Pune City. The Blasters fell behind in the match early through a David Trezeguet goal in the 15th minute but Chinadorai Sabeeth managed to level the score in the 41st minute, becoming the first Indian player to score for the team ever. It was then Penn Orji who scored the winning goal in the 65th minute as Kerala Blasters won 2–1.

The team then began what would be a long month of November for the team as they would have to play eight matches. Their first match came on 2 November against Mumbai City in Mumbai. The Blasters fell in the match 1–0 after Nicolas Anelka scored for Mumbai City from a free-kick. The team then returned to Kerala to play their first home game of the season of a three-game home stand against FC Goa on 6 November. After a goalless first half, it was Milagres Gonsalves who came up with the winning goal for Kerala Blasters in the 64th minute as the Blasters won 1–0. Despite the opening home victory, the Blasters were unable to do more than achieve 0–0 in their next two matches against the Delhi Dynamos and Mumbai City respectively.

After their three-match home stand, Kerala Blasters returned to the road as the took on the Delhi Dynamos in Delhi. A 61st-minute goal from Penn Orji was enough as the Blasters won the away tie 1–0. Five days later, the Blasters returned home to take on Atlético de Kolkata. Early goals from Iain Hume and Pedro Gusmão helped lead the Blasters to a 2–1 victory of the Kolkata side. The joy from the victory was short-lived though as Kerala Blasters ended the month losing two matches in a row. Their first defeat occurred away from home to FC Goa on 26 November. A brace from Miroslav Slepička and another goal from André Santos lead to the Blasters losing 3–0. That defeat was followed with a 1–0 defeat at home to Chennaiyin.

With just two matches left before the finals entering December, Kerala Blasters knew the two matches would be crucial for their season. Their first match occurred on 4 December against NorthEast United. Despite creating many chances upfront, the Blasters were held to a 0–0 result. That result meant that the final match of the regular season, at home to Pune City, would prove to be the decider between the two sides to see who qualifies for the finals. Due to a free-kick goal from Iain Hume and a fantastic performance from Sandip Nandy in goal, the Blasters came out victorious 1–0 and thus qualified for the finals.

13 October 2014 1	NorthEast United	1–0	Kerala Blasters	Guwahati
19:00 IST	Koke 45'	Report		Stadium: Indira Gandhi Athletic Stadium; Attendance: 29,500; Referee: Pratap Singh

21 October 2014 2	Chennaiyin	2–1	Kerala Blasters	Chennai
19:00 IST	Elano 14' (pen.); Mendy 63'	Report	Hume 50'	Stadium: Jawaharlal Nehru Stadium; Attendance: 19,430; Referee: Rahul Dsa

26 October 2014 3	Atlético de Kolkata	1–1	Kerala Blasters	Kolkata
16:30 IST	Sahni 22'	Report	Hume 41'	Stadium: Salt Lake Stadium; Attendance: 30,000; Referee: Arumughan Rowan

30 October 2014 4	Pune City	1–2	Kerala Blasters	Pune
19:00 IST	Trezeguet 15'	Report	Sabeeth 41'; Orji 65'	Stadium: Shree Shiv Chhatrapati Sports Complex; Attendance: 8,227; Referee: Tejas Nagvenkar

2 November 2014 5	Mumbai City	1–0	Kerala Blasters	Mumbai
19:00 IST	Anelka 45'	Report		Stadium: DY Patil Stadium; Attendance: 20,439; Referee: Jarred Gillett

6 November 2014 6	Kerala Blasters	1–0	Goa	Kochi
19:00 IST	Gonsalves 64'	Report		Stadium: Jawaharlal Nehru Stadium; Attendance: 49,517; Referee: Jarred Gillet

9 November 2014 7	Kerala Blasters	0–0	Delhi Dynamos	Kochi
19:00 IST		Report		Stadium: Jawaharlal Nehru Stadium; Attendance: 34,657; Referee: Pranjal Banerjee

12 November 2014 8	Kerala Blasters	0–0	Mumbai City	Kochi
19:00 IST		Report		Stadium: Jawaharlal Nehru Stadium; Attendance: 41,362; Referee: Pranjal Banerjee

16 November 2014 9	Delhi Dynamos	0–1	Kerala Blasters	Delhi
19:00 IST		Report	Orji 61'	Stadium: Jawaharlal Nehru Stadium; Attendance: 17,853; Referee: Jarred Gillet

21 November 2014 10	Kerala Blasters	2–1	Atlético de Kolkata	Kochi
19:00 IST	Hume 4'; Gusmão 42'	Report	Teferra 55'	Stadium: Jawaharlal Nehru Stadium; Attendance: 57,296; Referee: Ravshan Irmatov

26 November 2014 11	FC Goa	3–0	Kerala Blasters	Margao
19:00 IST	Slepička 63', 79'; Santos 69'	Report		Stadium: Fatorda Stadium; Attendance: 19,752; Referee: Ranjit Bakshi

30 November 2014 12	Kerala Blasters	0–1	Chennaiyin	Kochi
19:00 IST		Report	Pelissari	Stadium: Jawaharlal Nehru Stadium; Attendance: 61,323; Referee: Magho Singh

4 December 2014 13	Kerala Blasters	0–0	NorthEast United	Kochi
19:00 IST		Report		Stadium: Jawaharlal Nehru Stadium; Attendance: 43,299; Referee: Anthony Simoes

9 December 2014 14	Kerala Blasters	1–0	Pune City	Kochi
19:00 IST	Hume 23'	Report		Stadium: Jawaharlal Nehru Stadium; Attendance: 44,532; Referee: Samchista Doss

=== Table ===
Pos	Team	Pld	W	D	L	GF	GA	GD	Pts	Qualification
2	Goa	14	6	4	4	21	12	+9	22	Advance to ISL Play-offs
3	Atlético de Kolkata (C)	14	4	7	3	16	13	+3	19	Advance to ISL Play-offs
4	Kerala Blasters	14	5	4	5	9	11	−2	19	Advance to ISL Play-offs
5	Delhi Dynamos	14	4	6	4	16	14	+2	18	
6	Pune City	14	4	4	6	12	17	−5	16	

Source: Soccerway
Rules for classification: 1) points; 2) goal difference; 3) number of goals scored
(C) Champions

=== Results summary ===
Overall								Home						Away					
Pld	W	D	L	GF	GA	GD	Pts	W	D	L	GF	GA	GD	W	D	L	GF	GA	GD
14	5	4	5	9	11	−2	19	3	3	1	4	2	+2	2	1	4	5	9	−4

Source: http://www.indiansuperleague.com/kerala-blasters-fc/schedules-results

== Indian Super League finals ==
=== Final ===
The Kerala Blasters entered the finals as the fourth seed from the regular season and thus had to face the first seed, Chennaiyin in the semi-finals. The first leg of the semi-final turned out to be the Blasters' best offensive performance of the season as they came away with the 3–0 advantage. Ishfaq Ahmed scored the first goal for Kerala in the 27th minute before Iain Hume doubled the lead in the 29th minute. The match was set to finish 2–0 before Sushanth Mathew fired home the third goal for the Kerala Blasters. Despite having the advantage, the Blasters found themselves giving it away in Chennai. Strikes from Mikaël Silvestre and Jeje Lalpekhlua, as well as an own goal from Sandesh Jhingan saw the match end 3–0 to Chennaiyin and thus require extra-time to decide the tie. The match looked set to be going to penalties but it was Stephen Pearson who broke the deadlock in the 117th minute and send the Kerala Blasters into the final.

13 December 2014 Leg 1	Kerala Blasters	3–0	Chennaiyin	Kochi
19:00 IST	Ahmed 27'; Hume 29'; Mathew 90+4'	Report		Stadium: Jawaharlal Nehru Stadium; Attendance: 60,900; Referee: Pranjal Banerjee

16 December 2014 Leg 2	Chennaiyin	3–1 (a.e.t.) (3–4 agg.)	Kerala Blasters	Chennai
19:00 IST	Silvestre 42'; Jhingan (o.g.); Lalpekhlua 90'	Report	Pearson 117'	Stadium: Jawaharlal Nehru Stadium; Attendance: 25,327; Referee: Tejas Nagvenkar

=== Final ===
The final of the Indian Super League took place at the DY Patil Stadium in Mumbai against Atlético de Kolkata. The match remained at 0–0 until the very final minute of second stoppage time when Mohammed Rafique scored for Kolkata and thus take the title away from the Kerala Blasters.

20 December 2014 Final	Kerala Blasters	0–1	Atlético de Kolkata	Mumbai
18:00 IST		Report	Rafique 90+5'	Stadium: DY Patil Stadium; Attendance: 36,484; Referee: Ravshan Irmatov

== Player statistics ==
Season stats
#	Position	Player	GP	G
2	DF	(France) Cédric Hengbart	13	0
3	DF	(Scotland) Jamie McAllister	6	0
4	DF	(India) Ramandeep Singh	0	0
5	DF	(India) Nirmal Chettri	12	0
6	MF	(India) Renedy Singh	2	0
7	MF	(India) Sushanth Mathew	4	1
8	FW	(England) Michael Chopra	9	0
9	FW	(Brazil) Pedro Gusmão	7	1
10	FW	(Canada) Iain Hume	16	5
11	MF	(India) Ishfaq Ahmed	9	1
12	FW	(India) Chinadorai Sabeeth	8	1
13	MF	(India) Duleep Menon	0	0
14	MF	(India) Mehtab Hossain	9	0
15	DF	(India) Sandesh Jhingan	14	0
16	DF	(India) Gurwinder Singh	11	0
18	MF	(Nigeria) Penn Orji	13	2
21	MF	(India) Godwin Franco	4	0
22	DF	(France) Raphaël Romey	8	0
23	DF	(India) Avinabo Bag	5	0
24	GK	(India) Sandip Nandy	6	0
25	MF	(Scotland) Stephen Pearson	17	1
27	FW	(Australia) Andrew Barisic	11	0
29	DF	(India) Saumik Dey	10	0
30	GK	(India) Luis Barreto	1	0
32	DF	(Republic of Ireland) Colin Falvey	9	0
44	DF	(Brazil) Erwin Spitzner	0	0
70	GK	(England) David James	12	0
85	MF	(Spain) Pulga	6	0
88	FW	(India) Milagres Gonsalves	13	1

== See also ==
- 2014–15 in Indian football
- History of Kerala Blasters FC
