= 2015–16 Santosh Trophy =

2016 Santosh Trophy
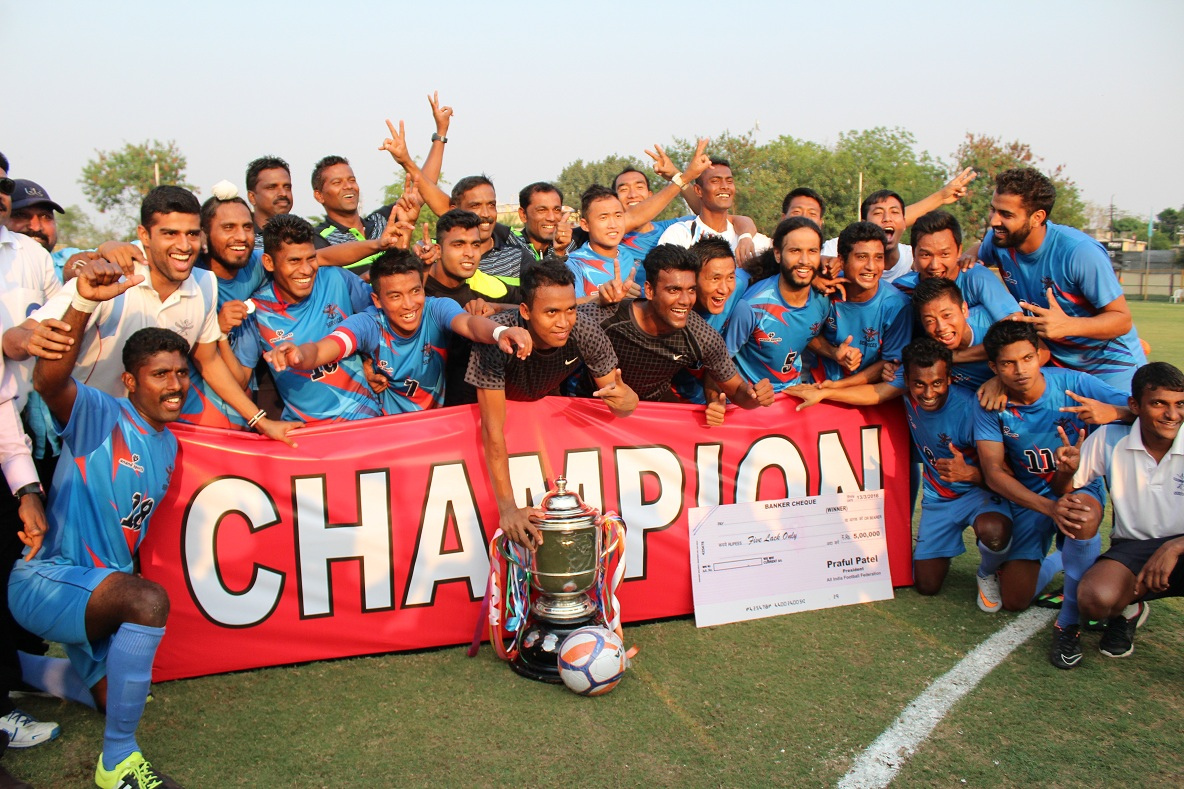

Tournament details
- Country: India
- Dates: 29 February – 13 March 2016
- Teams: 10

Final positions
- Champions: Services (5th title)
- Runners-up: Maharashtra

Tournament statistics
- Matches played: 23
- Goals scored: 55 (2.39 per match)
- Top goal scorer: Narohari Shreshta (4 goals)

Awards
- Best player: Arjun Tudu

The 2016 Santosh Trophy was the 70th edition of the Santosh Trophy, the main state competition in Indian football. The qualifiers for the tournament took place from 6 February and the final of the tournament proper was held in Nagpur from 13 March 2016.

== Round and dates ==
| Round | Match dates | Teams |
|---|---|---|
| Qualifiers | 6 February 2016 – 23 February 2016 | 33 |
| Group stage | 29 February 2016 – 9 March 2016 | 10 |
| Semi-finals | 11 March 2016 | 4 |
| Final | 13 March 2016 | 2 |

== Qualified Teams ==
The following 10 teams have qualified for the Santosh Trophy proper.

- Assam
- Goa
- Jammu & Kashmir
- Maharashtra
- Mizoram
- Punjab
- Railways
- Services
- Tamil Nadu
- West Bengal

== Group stage ==
=== Group A ===
| Pos | Team | Pld | W | D | L | GF | GA | GD | Pts | Qualification |
|---|---|---|---|---|---|---|---|---|---|---|
| 1 | Maharashtra | 4 | 3 | 0 | 1 | 7 | 2 | +5 | 9 | Advance to Semi-finals |
| 2 | Services | 4 | 3 | 0 | 1 | 5 | 3 | +2 | 9 | Advance to Semi-finals |
| 3 | Mizoram | 4 | 2 | 1 | 1 | 7 | 4 | +3 | 7 | |
| 4 | Jammu & Kashmir | 4 | 1 | 0 | 3 | 4 | 9 | −5 | 3 | |
| 5 | Railways | 4 | 0 | 1 | 3 | 3 | 8 | −5 | 1 | |

Updated to match(es) played on 8 March 2016. Source:
Rules for classification: 1) points; 2) goal difference; 3) goals scored; 4) head-to-head result.

=== Fixtures and Results ===
| 29 February 2016 | Mizoram | 1–1 | Railways | University Stadium, Nagpur |
| | Malsawmfela 90+4' (pen.) | Report | 58' Jagtar Singh |

| 29 February 2016 | Maharashtra | 3–1 | Jammu & Kashmir | SEC Railway Stadium, Nagpur |
| | Shrikant Veramullu 61', 70'; Raynier Fernandes 84' (pen.) | Report | 64' (pen.) Syed Shoaib |

| 2 March 2016 | Services | 1–0 | Jammu & Kashmir | University Stadium, Nagpur |
| | P Jain 52' | Report |

| 2 March 2016 | Railways | 0–3 | Maharashtra | SEC Railway Stadium, Nagpur |
| | | Report | 14' Vijith Shetty; 39' Mohammed Shabaz Pathan; 61' Aaron D'costa |

| 4 March 2016 | Mizoram | 0–1 | Maharashtra | SEC Railway Stadium, Nagpur |
| | | Report | 66' Mohammed Shabaz Pathan |

| 4 March 2016 | Services | 2–1 | Railways | University Stadium, Nagpur |
| | Vipin 14'; Vivek Kumar 67' | Report | 51' Jagtar Singh |

| 6 March 2016 | Services | 1–0 | Maharashtra | SEC Railway Stadium, Nagpur |
| | Francis Zoununtluanga 90' | Report |

| 6 March 2016 | Mizoram | 4–1 | Jammu & Kashmir | University Stadium, Nagpur |
| | K Lal Thanthanga 4'; Malsawmfela 59'; Laldingngheta 65'; Lalmunsanga 85' | Report | 5' Farukh Chowdhary |

| 8 March 2016 | Railways | 1–2 | Jammu & Kashmir | University Stadium, Nagpur |
| | Anil Kisku 61' | Report | 38' Shahnwaz Bashir; 85' Altamash Syed |

| 8 March 2016 | Services | 1–2 | Mizoram | SEC Railway Stadium, Nagpur |
| | Arjun Tudu 23' (pen.) | Report | 49' MS Dawngliana; 59' Lalkhapuimawia |

=== Group B ===
| Pos | Team | Pld | W | D | L | GF | GA | GD | Pts | Qualification |
|---|---|---|---|---|---|---|---|---|---|---|
| 1 | Tamil Nadu | 4 | 3 | 1 | 0 | 9 | 0 | +9 | 10 | Advance to Semi-finals |
| 2 | Goa | 4 | 3 | 1 | 0 | 5 | 1 | +4 | 10 | Advance to Semi-finals |
| 3 | West Bengal | 4 | 2 | 0 | 2 | 7 | 5 | +2 | 6 | |
| 4 | Punjab | 4 | 1 | 0 | 3 | 2 | 7 | −5 | 3 | |
| 5 | Assam | 4 | 0 | 0 | 4 | 1 | 11 | −10 | 0 | |

Updated to match(es) played on 9 March 2016. Source:
Rules for classification: 1) points; 2) goal difference; 3) goals scored; 4) head-to-head result.

=== Fixtures and Results ===
| 1 March 2016 | Tamil Nadu | 3–0 | Assam | University Stadium, Nagpur |
| | Kali Alaudeen 33' (pen.); Praveendran 81', 85' | Report |

| 1 March 2016 | West Bengal | 1–3 | Goa | SEC Railway Stadium, Nagpur |
| | Narohari Shreshta 90+3' | Report | 54' Milagres Gonsalves; 66' Beevan D'Mello; 69' Angelo Colaco |

| 3 March 2016 | Punjab | 0–1 | West Bengal | SEC Railway Stadium, Nagpur |
| | | Report | 11' Narohari Shreshta |

| 3 March 2016 | Assam | 0–1 | Goa | University Stadium, Nagpur |
| | | Report | 13' Rowilson Rodrigues |

| 5 March 2016 | Tamil Nadu | 0–0 | Goa | SEC Railway Stadium, Nagpur |
| | | Report |

| 5 March 2016 | Punjab | 2–0 | Assam | University Stadium, Nagpur |
| | | Report | 11' Vijay Kumar; 76' Pawan Kumar Tiwari |

| 7 March 2016 | Goa | 1–0 | Punjab | SEC Railway Stadium, Nagpur |
| | Francis Fernandes 7' | Report |

| 7 March 2016 | West Bengal | 0–1 | Tamil Nadu | University Stadium, Nagpur |
| | | Report | 51' Soosairaj |

| 9 March 2016 | West Bengal | 5–1 | Assam | University Stadium, Nagpur |
| | Dipendu Dowary 10'; Sheikh Faiz 24', 90+1'; Narohari Shreshta 39', 49' | Report | 90+3' Appuruba Phukan |

| 9 March 2016 | Punjab | 0–5 | Tamil Nadu | SEC Railway Stadium, Nagpur |
| | | Report | 51' Edwin Sydney; 63', 68', 87' Raegan; 65' Pradeep Mohanraj |

== Knockout stage ==
Semi-finals
11 March 2016
Maharashtra | 1
Tamil Nadu | 0
11 March 2016
Goa | 0
Services | 1

Final
13 March 2016
Maharashtra | 1
Services | 2

=== Semi-finals ===
11 March 2016

| Maharashtra | 1–0 | Tamil Nadu |
|---|---|---|
| Prem Kumar 58' (o.g.) | Report |

SEC Railway Stadium, Nagpur
11 March 2016

| Goa | 0–1 (a.e.t.) | Services |
|---|---|---|
| | Report | 115' (o.g.) Mohammed Ali |

SEC Railway Stadium, Nagpur

=== Final ===
13 March 2016

| Maharashtra | 1–2 | Services |
|---|---|---|
| Mohammed Shabaz Pathan 15' | Report | 26', 37' Arjun Tudu |

SEC Railway Stadium, Nagpur

== Goalscorers ==
4 Goals

- Narohari Shreshta (West Bengal)

3 Goals

- A Raegan (Tamil Nadu)
- Arjun Tudu (Services)
- Mohammed Shabaz Pathan (Maharashtra)

2 Goals

- Jagtar Singh (Railways)
- Malsawmfela (Mizoram)
- Sheikh Faiz (West Bengal)
- Shrikant Veramullu (Maharashtra)

1 Goal

- Aaron D'costa (Maharashtra)
- Altamash Syed (Jammu & Kashmir)
- Angelo Colaco (Goa)
- Appuruba Phukan (Assam)
- Anil Kisku (Railways)
- Beevan D'Mello (Goa)
- Edwin Sydney (Tamil Nadu)
- Farukh Chowdhary (Jammu & Kashmir)
- Francis Fernandes (Goa)
- Francis Zoununtluanga (Services)
- Kali Alaudeen (Tamil Nadu)
- K Lal Thanthanga (Mizoram)
- Lalkhapuimawia (Mizoram)
- Laldingngheta (Mizoram)
- Lalmunsanga (Mizoram)
- Milagres Gonsalves (Goa)
- MS Dawngliana (Mizoram)
- Pawan Kumar Tiwari (Punjab)
- P Jain (Services)
- Pradeep Mohanraj (Tamil Nadu)
- Raynier Fernandes (Maharashtra)
- Rowilson Rodrigues (Goa)
- Shahnwaz Bashir (Jammu & Kashmir)
- Soosairaj (Tamil Nadu)
- Syed Shoaib (Jammu & Kashmir)
- Vipin (Services)
- Vijay Kumar (Punjab)
- Vivek Kumar (Services)

== Notable players ==
| Position | Player | Team |
|---|---|---|
| GK | Laxmikant Kattimani | Goa |
| DF | Rowilson Rodrigues | Goa |
| DF | Shallum Pires | Goa |
| MF | Francis Fernandes | Goa |
| MF | Peter Carvalho | Goa |
| MF | Richard Costa | Goa |
| MF | Velito Cruz | Goa |
| FW | Angelo Colaco | Goa |
| FW | Beevan D'Mello | Goa |
| FW | Milagres Gonsalves | Goa |
| GK | Harshad Meher | Maharashtra |
| MF | Vijith Shetty | Maharashtra |
| FW | Abhishek Ambedkar | Maharashtra |
| DF | Lalrinchhana Tochhawng | Mizoram |
| DF | Lalrinzuala Khiangte | Mizoram |
| DF | Lalrozama Fanai | Mizoram |
| DF | Ricky Lallawmawma | Mizoram |
| MF | Laldingngheta | Mizoram |
| FW | Malsawmfela | Mizoram |
| DF | Gurwinder Singh | Punjab |
| DF | Vishal Kumar | Punjab |
| MF | Gurtej Singh | Punjab |
| FW | Ajay Singh | Punjab |
| GK | Jagroop Singh | Railways |
| DF | Phoolchand Hembram | Railways |
| DF | Rajib Boro | Railways |
| DF | Satish Kumar Jr. | Railways |
| MF | Keniston C | Railways |
| FW | Jagtar Singh | Railways |
| DF | Kali Alaudeen | Tamil Nadu |
| DF | Prem Kumar | Tamil Nadu |
| MF | Pradeep Mohanraj | Tamil Nadu |
| GK | Priyant Singh | West Bengal |
| MF | Anthony Soren | West Bengal |
| MF | Imran Khan | West Bengal |
| MF | Manish Maithani | West Bengal |
| MF | Mumtaz Akhtar | West Bengal |
| FW | Ashim Biswas | West Bengal |
| FW | Dipendu Dowary | West Bengal |
