= Bijendra Rai =

Indian footballer (born 1992)

Personal information
- Date of birth: 8 June 1992 (age 34)
- Place of birth: Jorethang, Sikkim, India
- Position: Midfielder

Team information
- Current team: IMG RELIANCE

Youth career
- 2010: Nang Kiew Rat

Senior career*
Years	Team	Apps	(Gls)
2010–2011	Royal Wahingdoh		
2011–2012	Pailan Arrows	4	(0)
2012–2013	Mohun Bagan	0	(0)
2014–2015	Mohammedan S.C.	0	(0)
2016–	Gangtok Himalayan SC	0	(0)

International career
2007–2008	India U16	5	(1)
- * Club domestic league appearances and goals

Bijendra Rai (born 8 June 1992) is an Indian footballer who currently plays for IMG RELIANCE.

== Early career ==
He was born in Jorethang, South Sikkim district. His father and elder brother were footballers. His father used to play football locally but his brother played for a club in Darjeeling.

He joined Gangtok State Sports Academy in 2006 and stayed there till 2009. The tag line of the academy was "Search for more Baichung." he took the name of few coaches who had helped me a lot while in the academy. They are Hongunorden Lepcha, Suresh Mukhia, and Suren Chhetri.

While in the academy, he got the chance to play for the Sikkim U-16 team.

== Career ==
In 2010, he went to Shillong and joined Nang-Kiew-Rat where he played as a striker in the local league.

In the next season, he joined Royal Wahingdoh F.C. where he played for 4 months. He played in the 2011 I-League 2nd Division. They reached the 2nd phase but could not qualify for the I-league.

He scored 5 goals in that tournament. His best match was against Ar-Hima FC. In that match, though he scored 2 goals, they lost the 3–2. They trounced Southern Samity 6–1, where he scored 1 goal.

=== Pailan Arrows ===
The 2011–12 season got off to a good start for Rai as he made his debut for Pailan Arrows in the 2011 Indian Federation Cup against Mumbai. He then made his I-League debut against HAL SC on 2 November 2011.

=== Eagles ===
On 5 December 2013 it was announced that Bijendra has signed up with Eagles F.C. of Kerala on loan for 2013–14 season along with Nadong Bhutia, Avinabo Bag, Jagroop Singh, Bisheshwor Singh, Biswajit Saha, Ramandeep Singh and Govin Singh. Moreover, IMG-Reliance, the organisers of the proposed IPL-style football tournament Indian Super League, and Eagles F.C. will facilitate a two to six week training stint for the eight players with UK based Reading F.C. Academy.

== International ==
In 2007, Coach Collin Toal gave him a chance for the 1st time in the U-16 Indian team, when we went to play in Saudi Arabia for the AFC qualifying Round. Later on, they went for exposure trips to Germany and England.

In the Gangtok Academy, he used to play as a striker, but in the Indian team, he played for the first time as a right winger.

He scored his first goal for U-16 Indian team against Sri Lanka. He scored the goal within 20 seconds. He placed the ball inside goal from Lalrindika's cross.

Later, he also got a chance in the U-19 Indian team for an exposure trip to Malaysia and for a tournament in Dubai, but he missed the tour due to injury at the last moment.

== Career statistics ==
=== Club ===
Statistics accurate as of 29 December 2011

Club	Season	League			Cup			AFC			Total		
Club	Season	Apps	Goals	Assists	Apps	Goals	Assists	Apps	Goals	Assists	Apps	Goals	Assists
Pailan Arrows	2011–12	4	0	0	2	0	0	—	—	—	6	0	0
Career total		4	0	0	2	0	0	0	0	0	6	0	0
