= Ameerudeen Mohaideen =

Indian football player

Personal information
- Full name: Ameerudeen Mohaideen
- Date of birth: 1 May 1992 (age 34)
- Place of birth: Thanjavur, Tamil Nadu, India
- Position: Forward

Team information
- Current team: Chennai City
- Number: 27

Senior career*
Years	Team	Apps	(Gls)
- Sports Authority of India
- Income Tax
2018–2019	Chennai City	10	(1)
2021–	Chennai City	1	(0)
- * Club domestic league appearances and goals as of 02:01, 13 March 2021 (UTC)

Ameerudeen Mohaideen (born 1 May 1992) is an Indian professional footballer who plays as a forward for I-League club Chennai City.

== Club career ==
=== Early life ===
Born in Thanjavur, Tamil Nadu, Mohaideen first participated in the Chennai Football Association Senior Division with Sport Authority of India. In 2012, Mohaideen was selected for the Tamil Nadu side that would participate in the 2011–12 edition of the Santosh Trophy. He was selected for this second Santosh Trophy for the 2013–14 edition. His coach while playing with Tamil Nadu was his former Sport Authority of India coach M. Narayanamoorthy. On 3 February 2014, Mohaideen scored for Tamil Nadu against Andhra Pradesh during the qualifiers.

The next season, Mohaideen was selected to the Tamil Nadu squad for the 2014–15 Santosh Trophy. He was then part of the squad the next edition. In 2015, Mohaideen was playing with Income Tax.

=== Chennai City ===
Prior to the 2018–19 season, Mohaideen joined local I-League club Chennai City. He made his debut for the club on 4 November 2018 against Gokulam Kerala. He came on as a 42nd-minute substitute and scored the club's third goal in the 68th minute as Chennai City won 3–2.

Success came at the end of the season for Mohaideen as Chennai City won the I-League title.

== Career statistics ==
As of match played 3 February 2021

Appearances and goals by club, season and competition
Club	Season	League			Cup		Continental		Total	
Club	Season	Division	Apps	Goals	Apps	Goals	Apps	Goals	Apps	Goals
Chennai City	2018–19	I-League	10	1	—	—	—	—	10	1
Chennai City	2020–21	I-League	1	0	—	—	—	—	1	0
Chennai City	Total		11	1	0	0	0	0	11	1
Career total			11	1	0	0	0	0	11	1

== Honours ==
Chennai City

- I-League: 2018–19
