= Raegan Albarnas =

Indian footballer

Personal information
- Full name: Raegan Albarnas
- Date of birth: 11 October 1989 (age 37)
- Place of birth: India
- Position: Striker

Team information
- Current team: Chennai City
- Number: 12

Senior career*
Years	Team	Apps	(Gls)
2017	Chennai City	3	(0)

International career
2008	India U16		
- * Club domestic league appearances and goals as of 12 March 2017

Raegan Albarnas is a professional association football player who plays for Chennai City F.C. and for Tamil Nadu in the national level.

== Early career ==
Raegan began his career with representing Tamil Nadu football team in Santosh Trophy. In 2016 Santosh Trophy, he scored 3 goals and helped his team reach the semi-finals.

== Club career ==
=== Chennai City ===
In January 2017, Raegan was signed by I-League debutants, Chennai City F.C. Raegan made his professional debut against Mohun Bagan A.C. on 21 January 2017 when he was substituted in on 80th minute. He was later released by the club, by mutual consent. He joined AGORC FC in the Chennai Super Division Football League.

== International career ==
Raegan was selected in the squad for 2008 AFC U-16 Championship to represent India national under-16 football team.
