= Biswajit Saha =

Indian footballer

Personal information
- Full name: Biswajit Saha
- Date of birth: 15 December 1987 (age 38)
- Place of birth: Kolkata, India
- Position: Left back

Team information
- Current team: Atletico de Kolkata

Youth career
- 2006–2007: Milan Samity

Senior career*
Years	Team	Apps	(Gls)
2007–2009	George Telegraph		
2009–2011	Mohun Bagan		
2011–2012	Salgaocar		
2012–2013	Mohun Bagan	20	(0)
2013–2014	→ Eagles F.C. (loan)		
2014–	Atletico de Kolkata	11	(0)
2014–	Sporting Clube de Goa	3	(0)
- * Club domestic league appearances and goals as of 16:16, 23 May 2015 (UTC)

Biswajit Saha (Bengali: বিশ্বজিৎ সাহা; born 15 December 1987) is an Indian footballer who plays as a left back.

== Career ==
After becoming Champions, he joined Milan Samity in 2006 and played in Calcutta Football League 1st Division B group. Then he joined George Telegraph SC. where he played for a couple of seasons. While in George, he was settled down nicely in the left back position by coach Raghu Nandy. In 2007, George Telegraph defeated East Bengal 3–1. Saha played a vital role in that match. The next year, they defeated both East Bengal and Mohammedan SC in Calcutta Football League to finish in 3rd position. He also represented West Bengal in Santosh Trophy. Where they finished runners up, losing to Goa in tie-breaker.

=== Mohun Bagan ===
He joined Mohun Bagan in 2009. Since he had a very good season in George Telegraph, he got an offer from Mohun Bagan, East Bengal and Chirag United, but he chose to join Mohun Bagan, because all his family members were supporters of the club.

He first played for Mohun Bagan in the semi-final of the 2009 IFA Shield against Chirag United. They were down to 10 men within the first 10 minutes and eventually won the match in the tie breaker. He came as a replacement for Nallappan Mohanraj in the extra time.

=== Salgaocar ===
He received an offer from Salgaocar FC. Karim Bencherifa, the coach of Salgaocar, prompted him to leave Kolkata. Salgaocar won the Federation Cup after 14 years. He was the only Bengali player in that team. The last time when Salgaocar won the Federation Cup, Shabbir Ali was the only Bengali player in their team. Incidentally, in the year 1987, Salgaocar defeated East Bengal 2–1 to lift the title whereas in 2011 they defeated the same team 3–1 to win the 2011 Indian Federation Cup.

=== Mohun Bagan ===
In 2012, he re-joined Mohun Bagan. He played 20 Matches for Mohun Bagan in the 2012–13 I-League.

=== Eagles ===
On 5 December 2013 it was announced that Biswajit has signed up with Eagles F.C. of Kerala on loan for 2013–14 season along with Nadong Bhutia, Bijendra Rai, Avinabo Bag, Jagroop Singh, Bisheshwor Singh, Ramandeep Singh and Govin Singh. Moreover, IMG-Reliance, the organisers of the proposed IPL-style football tournament Indian Super League, and Eagles F.C. will facilitate a two to six week training stint for the eight players with UK based Reading F.C. Academy.
