= Govin Singh =

Indian footballer (born 1988)

Personal information
- Full name: Moirangthem Govin Singh
- Date of birth: 3 January 1988 (age 38)
- Place of birth: Tentha, Manipur, India
- Height: 1.84 m (6 ft 0 in)
- Position: Defender

Team information
- Current team: Southern Samity

Senior career*
Years	Team	Apps	(Gls)
2008–2009	Churchill Brothers	16	(0)
2009–2011	East Bengal	16	(0)
2011	Salgaocar	5	(0)
2011–2012	United Sikkim	0	(0)
2012–2013	Shillong Lajong	4	(1)
2014	Delhi Dynamos	10	(0)
2014–16	Royal Wahingdoh	17	(0)
2015–16	→ Pune City (loan)	14	(0)
2016–18	NEROCA	32	(1)
2018–2019	Aizawl	14	(1)
2019–	Southern Samity	10	(0)

International career
2011	India	2	(0)
- * Club domestic league appearances and goals as of 15:21, 9 September 2017 (UTC)

Moirangthem Govin Singh (born 3 January 1988 in Tentha, Manipur) is an Indian footballer who plays as a defender for Southern Samity. He has been capped twice for India at senior level. He was part of the Churchill Brothers S.C. squad that won I-League 2008-09.

Singh won the I-League with his former club Churchill Brothers S.C. in season 2008-2009 where he formed a solid defensive partnership alongside Gouramangi Moirangthem.

== Club career ==
=== Churchill Brothers ===
Singh signed for Churchill Brothers S.C. in 2008 and after 22 games in which Singh played in 16 of them Churchill Brothers S.C. won the I-League championship.

=== East Bengal ===
After his one-year stint with Churchill Brothers Singh signed with Kolkata club Kingfisher East Bengal F.C. who also play in the I-League. During his maiden year in Kolkata Singh played in 16 games out of the 26 matches as Kingfisher ended the season in 2nd place.

=== Salgaocar ===
After his one-year stay with Kingfisher East Bengal, Singh signed with Goa club Salgaocar S.C. also of the I-League. During his first year with Salgaocar Singh played in only five matches because of his Indian team commitments and because of injury. Even though he was absent from the team Singh was available for the match that won Salgaocar the I-League title. With that victory Govin Singh became the first and only player in I-League history to win the title with more than one club.

=== United Sikkim ===
After the season ended Singh made a surprise move by signing for I-League 2nd Division team United Sikkim F.C. for one year.

=== Eagles ===
On 5 December 2013 it was announced that Govin has signed up with Eagles F.C. of Kerala on loan for 2013–14 season along with Nadong Bhutia, Bijendra Rai, Avinabo Bag, Jagroop Singh, Bisheshwor Singh, Biswajit Saha and Ramandeep Singh. Moreover, IMG-Reliance, the organisers of the proposed IPL-style football tournament Indian Super League, and Eagles F.C. will facilitate a two to six week training stint for the eight players with UK based Reading F.C. Academy.

=== Pune City ===
In July 2015 Singh was drafted to play for FC Pune City in the 2015 Indian Super League.

== International career ==
Govin Singh played and started his first match for India against Chinese Taipei on 21 March 2011. He was also included in playing 11 against FC Bayern Munich in Bhaichung Bhutia's farewell match in New Delhi.

== Honours ==
India

- AFC Challenge Cup: 2008
- SAFF Championship: 2011
