= Nadong Bhutia =

Indian footballer (born 1993)

Personal information
- Full name: Nadong Bhutia
- Date of birth: 25 November 1993 (age 32)
- Place of birth: Kalimpong, India
- Height: 1.80 m (5 ft 11 in)
- Positions: Striker; winger

Senior career*
Years	Team	Apps	(Gls)
2012–2013	United Sikkim	16	(8)
2014	Mumbai City	13	(2)
2014–2015	Royal Wahingdoh	22	(7)
2015	Atletico de Kolkata	9	(0)
2016–2017	Pathachakra	19	(5)
2017–2018	Minerva Punjab	5	(0)
2018–2019	Real Kashmir	29	(7)
Total		119	(29)
- * Club domestic league appearances and goals as of 21 May 2018

Nadong Bhutia (born 25 November 1993) is an Indian former footballer who played as a striker or winger.

== Career ==
=== United Sikkim ===
Bhutia made his debut for United Sikkim F.C. on 19 January 2013 during an I-League match against Dempo S.C. at the Duler Stadium in Mapusa, Goa in which he was in Starting 11 and then went on as a 58th-minute substitute for Lineker Machado; United Sikkim lost the match 7–0.

=== Eagles ===
On 5 December 2013 it was announced that Nadong has signed up with Eagles F.C. of Kerala on loan for 2013–14 season along with Bijendra Rai, Avinabo Bag, Jagroop Singh, Bisheshwor Singh, Biswajit Saha, Ramandeep Singh and Govin Singh. Moreover, IMG-Reliance, the organisers of the proposed IPL-style football tournament Indian Super League, and Eagles F.C. will facilitate a two to six week training stint for the eight players with UK based Reading F.C. Academy.

=== Mumbai City FC ===
Nadong represented Mumbai City FC in the 2014 Indian Super League and made 11 appearances. He was once given the "SWIFT MOMENT OF THE MATCH AWARD".

=== Atlético de Kolkata ===
In July 2015 Bhutia was drafted to play for Atlético de Kolkata in the 2015 Indian Super League. Habas pronounced him as a speedster of ATK.

=== Minerva Punjab FC ===
In November 2017 Bhutia joined Minerva Punjab FC.

== Career statistics ==
=== Club ===
Statistics accurate as of 22 March 2016

Club	Season	League		Federation Cup		AFC		Total	
Club	Season	Apps	Goals	Apps	Goals	Apps	Goals	Apps	Goals
United Sikkim	2012–13	16	2	0	0	—	—	16	2
Mumbai City FC	2014	13	0	—	—	—	—	11	0
Royal Wahingdoh	2014–15	11	5	—	—	—	—	11	5
Minerva Punjab	2017–18	0	0	—	—	—	—	0	0
Career total		30	3	0	0	0	0	30	3

== Honours ==
Real Kashmir

- I-League 2: 2017-18
