= Rodrigo Arroz =

Brazilian footballer (born 1984)

Personal information
- Full name: Rodrigo Antônio Magalhães Alves Pereira
- Date of birth: 21 March 1984 (age 42)
- Place of birth: Valença, Rio de Janeiro, Brazil
- Height: 1.83 m (6 ft 0 in)
- Position: Centre-back

Team information
- Current team: Tigres do Brasil

Youth career
- 2004: Flamengo

Senior career*
Years	Team	Apps	(Gls)
2005–2008	Flamengo		
2008–2010	Belenenses		
2011	Grêmio Prudente		
2012	Guarani		
2013	Boa Esporte		
2013–2015	Linense		
2015	Caxias		
2015	Kerala Blasters		
2016	Paulista		
2016	Sampaio Corrêa		
2017–	Tigres do Brasil		
- * Club domestic league appearances and goals as of 4 December 2015

Rodrigo Antônio Magalhães Alves Pereira, known as Rodrigo Arroz, (born 21 March 1984), is a Brazilian footballer who plays as a central defender.

== Career ==
Rodrigo Arroz began his youth career in Flamengo. In 2005, he had formally signed a contract with the professional club and had played until the end of the 2007–2008 season.

On 8 January 2011, he joined Grêmio Prudente.

In November 2015, Arroz was signed as an injury for Sanchez Watt by Kerala Blasters.

== Honours ==
- Brazilian Cup: 2006
- Taça Guanabara: 2007, 2008
- Rio de Janeiro State League: 2007, 2008
