= Prem Kumar (footballer) =

Indian footballer (born 1989)

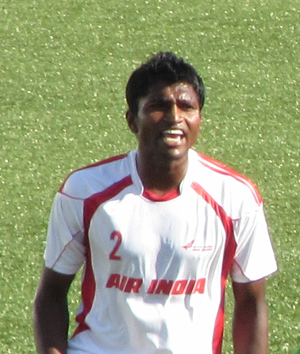

Personal information
- Date of birth: 21 March 1989 (age 37)
- Place of birth: Chennai, Tamil Nadu, India
- Position: Defender

Team information
- Current team: Air India
- Number: 29

Senior career*
Years	Team	Apps	(Gls)
2010–2011	Mumbai	0	(0)
2011–2013	Air India	17	(0)
- * Club domestic league appearances and goals as of 13 May 2013

Prem Kumar (born 21 March 1989 in Chennai, Tamil Nadu) is an Indian footballer who played as a defender for Air India FC in the I-League.

== Career ==
=== Air India ===
After spending two seasons in the Mumbai youth team Kumar signed for I-League club Air India FC. On 27 March 2013 Kumar was sent-off against United Sikkim at the Paljor Stadium in the 31st minute as Air India went on to lose the match 5–0.

== Career statistics ==
=== Club ===
Statistics accurate as of 12 May 2013

Club	Season	League		Federation Cup		Durand Cup		AFC		Total	
Club	Season	Apps	Goals	Apps	Goals	Apps	Goals	Apps	Goals	Apps	Goals
Air India	2011–12	4	0	0	0	0	0	—	—	4	0
Air India	2012–13	13	0	0	0	0	0	—	—	13	0
Career total		17	0	0	0	0	0	0	0	17	0
