= Anthony Barbosa =

Indian footballer

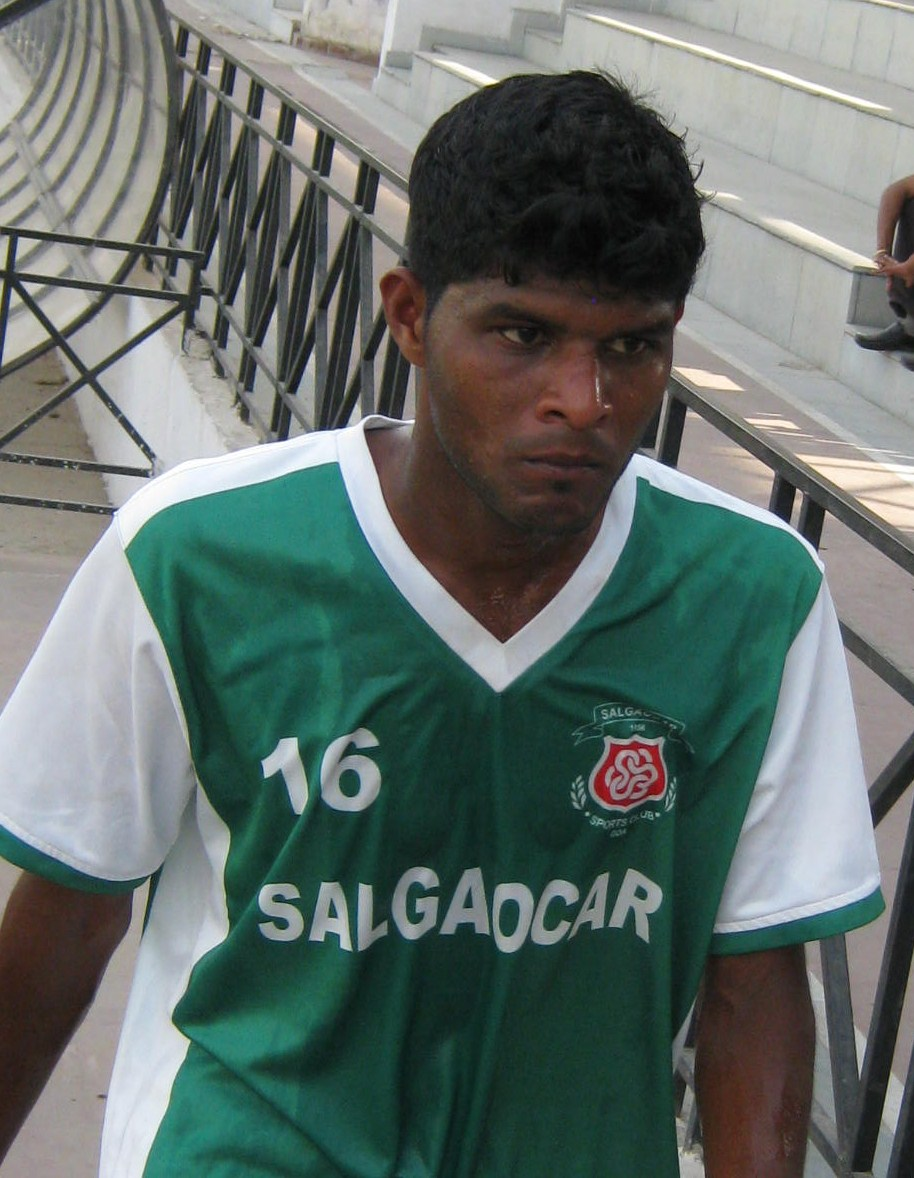

Personal information
- Full name: Anthony Barbosa
- Date of birth: 13 July 1989 (age 37)
- Place of birth: Raia, Goa, India
- Height: 1.75 m (5 ft 9 in)
- Position: Midfielder

Senior career*
| Years | Team | Apps | (Gls) |
| 2010–2013 | Salgaocar | 8 | (0) |
| 2013 | Churchill Brothers | 3 | (0) |
| 2014 | Chennaiyin | 0 | (0) |
- * Club domestic league appearances and goals as of 14 June 2015

Anthony Barbosa born in Raia, Goa is an Indian football player.

== Career ==
=== Youth career ===
Barbosa comes from Raia, Goa and began his football career with the Raia SC for the U-15 team. He used to watch a lot of tournaments. "He used to watch the teams play, their styles and compare himself to them. He then attended the Salgaocar Youth development football trials. Within 2 years, he was selected for Salgaocar's senior team.

=== Salgaocar ===
During the course of his first season Barbosa played in only five games and scored two goals.

=== Churchill Brothers ===
On 26 May 2013 it was announced that Barbosa has signed for Churchill Brothers. He made his debut for Churchill Brothers in the I-League on 21 September 2013 against Salgaocar at the Duler Stadium; as Churchill Brothers lost the match 1–0.

== International ==
Barbosa was first selected to the India U-23 team in June 2011 for the 2012 Olympics qualifier against Qatar but did not feature in any of the two matches.
