= Arjun Tudu =

Indian footballer (born 1990)

Personal information
- Date of birth: 1 January 1990 (age 36)
- Place of birth: India
- Position: Forward

Senior career*
Years	Team	Apps	(Gls)
2008–2016	Army Red		
2016	Odisha		
2019–2020	Southern Samity		
- * Club domestic league appearances and goals

Arjun Tudu (born 1 January 1990) is an Indian former professional footballer who played as a forward.

== Early life ==
Tudu was born in 1990 in India. He used his father's football shoes as a child.

== Club career ==
Tudu started his career with Army Red. In 2016, he signed for Odisha. In 2019, he signed for Southern Samity. He has won the Santosh Trophy.

== International career ==
Tudu was called up to train with the India national team. He was first called up for a 2015 SAFF Championship training camp.

== Style of play ==
Tudu mainly operated as a forward. He was known for his ball control.

== Personal life ==
Tudu is the son of Chunnu Tudu. He is a native of Sarjamda, India.
