= Jagroop Singh =

Indian footballer (born 1991)

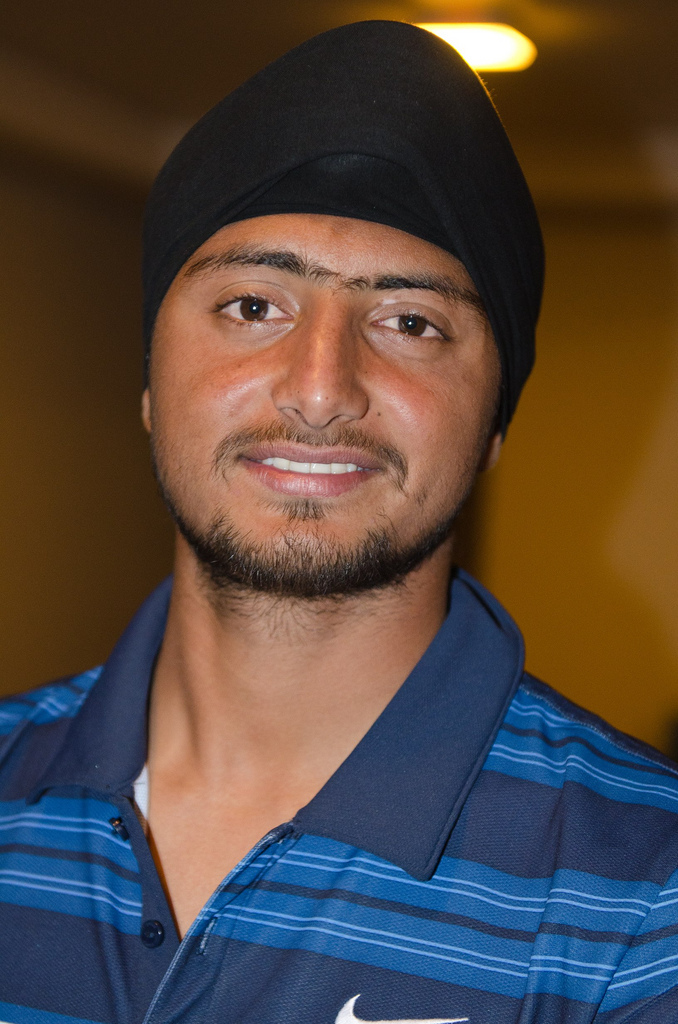

Personal information
- Date of birth: 16 May 1991 (age 35)
- Place of birth: Gurdaspur, Punjab, India
- Height: 1.79 m (5 ft 10 1/2 in)
- Position: Goalkeeper

Team information
- Current team: Delhi Dynamos

Senior career*
| Years | Team | Apps | (Gls) |
| 2010–2011 | Indian Arrows | 25 | (0) |
| 2011–2012 | Prayag United | 3 | (0) |
| 2012–2013 | Air India | 10 | (0) |
| 2013–2014 | Eagles | | |
| 2014– | Delhi Dynamos | 0 | (0) |

International career
| 2009–2010 | India U19 | 3 | (0) |
| 2011 | India U23 | 1 | (0) |
- * Club domestic league appearances and goals

Jagroop Singh (born 16 May 1991 in Gurdaspur, Punjab) is an Indian footballer who plays as a goalkeeper for Delhi Dynamos FC of the Indian Super League.

== Career ==
=== Indian Arrows ===
For the 2010-11 I-League season Singh played for Indian Arrows after being scouted from his state team Gurdaspur. After his first season in the top flight of Indian football Singh finished with 25 games played out of 26 and earning huge praise by his Indian Arrows and India U23 coach Desmond Bulpin.

=== Prayag United ===
In July 2011 Singh announced that he has signed on with Prayag United S.C. which is a club also in the I-League.

=== Air India ===
After the season ended Singh moved on yet again, this time to Air India FC who are also in the I-League. He made his debut for Air India on 28 October 2012 against Mohun Bagan in which Air India lost the match 1–0.

=== Eagles ===
On 5 December 2013 Singh signed with Eagles F.C. of Kerala on loan for 2013–14 season along with Nadong Bhutia, Bijendra Rai, Avinabo Bag, Bisheshwor Singh, Biswajit Saha, Ramandeep Singh and Govin Singh. Moreover, IMG-Reliance, the organisers of the proposed IPL-style football tournament Indian Super League, and Eagles F.C. facilitated a two to six week training stint for the eight players with UK based Reading F.C. Academy.

=== Delhi Dynamos ===
Singh has played in the Hero Indian Super League for the Delhi Dynamos since October 2014. He is one of the three goalkeepers of the team, sharing his position with Marek Čech and Kristof Van Hout.

== Career statistics ==
=== Club ===
Statistics accurate as of 12 May 2013

| Club | Season | League | | Federation Cup | | Durand Cup | | AFC | | Total | |
| Club | Season | Apps | Goals | Apps | Goals | Apps | Goals | Apps | Goals | Apps | Goals |
|---|---|---|---|---|---|---|---|---|---|---|---|
| Pailan Arrows | 2010–11 | 25 | 0 | 0 | 0 | 0 | 0 | — | — | 25 | 0 |
| Prayag United | 2011-12 | 3 | 0 | 0 | 0 | 0 | 0 | - | - | 3 | 0 |
| Air India | 2012-13 | 10 | 0 | 0 | 0 | 0 | 0 | - | - | 10 | 0 |
| Career total | | 36 | 0 | 0 | 0 | 0 | 0 | 0 | 0 | 36 | 0 |
