= João Coimbra =

Portuguese footballer (born 1986)

Personal information
- Full name: João Carlos Amaral Marques Coimbra
- Date of birth: 24 May 1986 (age 40)
- Place of birth: Santa Comba Dão, Portugal
- Height: 1.83 m (6 ft 0 in)
- Position: Midfielder

Youth career
- 1995–1996: Amora
- 1996–2005: Benfica

Senior career*
Years	Team	Apps	(Gls)
2005–2006	Benfica B	26	(1)
2006–2008	Benfica	13	(0)
2007–2008	→ Nacional (loan)	8	(0)
2008–2009	Marítimo	0	(0)
2008–2009	→ Gil Vicente (loan)	14	(0)
2009–2014	Estoril	90	(3)
2014–2015	Académico Viseu	19	(0)
2015	Rapid București	12	(0)
2015	Kerala Blasters	11	(1)
2016–2017	União Leiria	27	(1)
2017–2018	Trofense	28	(2)
2018–2021	Mondorf-les-Bains	48	(0)
Total		296	(8)

International career
2001–2002	Portugal U16	10	(0)
2002–2003	Portugal U17	18	(0)
2004	Portugal U18	5	(0)
2004–2005	Portugal U19	7	(0)
2005–2006	Portugal U20	14	(0)
2007	Portugal U21	4	(1)
Medal record
Men's football
Representing Portugal
UEFA European U17 Championship
Winner	2003 Portugal
- * Club domestic league appearances and goals

João Carlos Amaral Marques Coimbra (born 24 May 1986) is a Portuguese former professional footballer who played as a midfielder.

== Club career ==
Coimbra was born in Santa Comba Dão, Viseu District. A product of S.L. Benfica's youth system, he appeared in 13 Primeira Liga games with the first team over the course of two seasons, after which he was loaned to Madeira's C.D. Nacional also of the top division for the 2007–08 campaign.

In July 2008, Coimbra was definitely sold by Benfica, joining C.S. Marítimo. Upon arriving, he was immediately loaned to Segunda Liga club Gil Vicente F.C. in a season-long move.

After this, Coimbra returned to Marítimo but was immediately released, moving to another side in division two, G.D. Estoril Praia. He contributed 26 matches (all starts) and two goals in 2011–12, as his team returned to the top tier after an absence of seven years.

Coimbra represented in quick succession Académico de Viseu F.C. and FC Rapid București after leaving Estoril in 2014, the latter from Romania. On 3 August 2015, he signed for Indian Super League franchise Kerala Blasters FC.

In the summer of 2016, Coimbra returned to Portugal, on a one-year deal with U.D. Leiria.

== Personal life ==
Coimbra studied medicine at the University of Lisbon.

== Career statistics ==
As of match played on 3 December 2015

Club	Season	League			Cup		Other		Total	
Club	Season	Division	Apps	Goals	Apps	Goals	Apps	Goals	Apps	Goals
Benfica	2005–06	Primeira Liga	1	0	0	0	0	0	1	0
Benfica	2006–07	Primeira Liga	12	0	1	0	0	0	13	0
Benfica	Total		13	0	1	0	0	0	14	0
Nacional (loan)	2007–08	Primeira Liga	8	0	2	0	—		10	0
Gil Vicente (loan)	2008–09	Segunda Liga	14	0	1	0	—		15	0
Estoril	2009–10	Segunda Liga	21	0	6	0	—		27	0
Estoril	2010–11	Segunda Liga	28	1	10	0	—		38	1
Estoril	2011–12	Segunda Liga	26	2	8	1	—		34	3
Estoril	2012–13	Primeira Liga	14	0	4	0	—		18	0
Estoril	2013–14	Primeira Liga	1	0	0	0	—		1	0
Estoril	Total		90	3	28	1	—		118	4
Académico Viseu	2014–15	Segunda Liga	19	0	5	1	—		24	1
Rapid București	2014–15	Liga I	12	0	0	0	—		12	0
Kerala Blasters	2015	Indian Super League	11	1	—		—		11	1
Career total			167	4	37	1	0	0	204	5

== Honours ==
Estoril

- Segunda Liga: 2011–12

Portugal

- UEFA European Under-17 Championship: 2003
