= Avinabo Bag =

Indian footballer (born 1989)

Personal information
- Full name: Avinabo Bag
- Date of birth: 8 September 1989 (age 37)
- Place of birth: Kalimpong, West Bengal, India
- Height: 1.63 m (5 ft 4 in)
- Position: Right back

Team information
- Current team: Bhawanipore

Youth career
- Kalighat MS

Senior career*
Years	Team	Apps	(Gls)
2011–2013	Pailan Arrows	16	(0)
2013–2014	→ Eagles F.C. (on loan)	-	(-)
2014	Kerala Blasters	5	(0)
2015–2016	East Bengal	5	(1)
2016–2017	Southern Samity	9	(0)
2020–2021	Mohammedan	4	(0)
2021–2022	Peerless SC		
2022–	Bhawanipore		
- * Club domestic league appearances and goals as of 16:05, 26 November 2014 (UTC)

Avinabo Bag (born 8 September 1989 in West Bengal) is an Indian footballer who plays as a defender for Bhawanipore.

== Career ==
=== Pailan Arrows ===
During the summer of 2011 Bag joined Pailan Arrows of the I-League from Kalighat MS. Bag made his professional debut for Pailan against Salgaocar on 28 October 2012 in the I-League. Pailan lost the match 0–4. He then scored his first goal of his career on 28 August 2012 against Air India FC during the 2012 Durand Cup in which Pailan drew 1–1 and we knocked-out by 2 points.

=== Eagles ===
On 5 December 2013 it was announced that Bag has signed up with Eagles F.C. of Kerala on loan for 2013–14 season along with Nadong Bhutia, Bijendra Rai, Jagroop Singh, Bisheshwor Singh, Biswajit Saha, Ramandeep Singh and Govin Singh. Moreover, IMG-Reliance, the organisers of the proposed IPL-style football tournament Indian Super League, and Eagles F.C. will facilitate a two to six week training stint for the eight players with UK based Reading F.C. Academy.

=== Mohammedan SC ===
I-League club Mohammedan SC signed former Kerala Blasters FC midfielder Avinabo Bag for I-League 2020–21 Season.

== Career statistics ==
=== Club ===
Statistics accurate as of 6 January 2013

Club	Season	League		Federation Cup		Durand Cup		AFC		Total	
Club	Season	Apps	Goals	Apps	Goals	Apps	Goals	Apps	Goals	Apps	Goals
Pailan Arrows	2011–12	9	0	0	0	0	0	—	—	9	0
Pailan Arrows	2012–13	7	0	2	0	2	1	—	—	11	1
Career total		16	0	2	0	2	1	0	0	20	1
