= Ramandeep Singh (footballer) =

Indian footballer (born 1991)

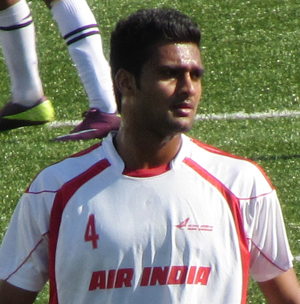

Personal information
- Date of birth: 27 June 1991 (age 35)
- Place of birth: Amritsar, Punjab, India
- Height: 1.87 m (6 ft 1 1/2 in)
- Position: Defender

Team information
- Current team: Delhi FC

Youth career
- 2008–2010: Tata FA
- 2010–2011: Mumbai

Senior career*
Years	Team	Apps	(Gls)
2011–13	Air India	29	(0)
2013-14	Eagles FC	18	(2)
2014–15	Kerala Blasters	1	(0)
2016−18	Minerva Punjab	20	(0)
2019-2020	Trau FC	10	(0)
2021-2022	Delhi FC	8	(0)
- * Club domestic league appearances and goals as of 13:52, 13 July 2015 (UTC)

Ramandeep Singh (born 27 June 1991 in Amritsar, Punjab) is an Indian professional footballer who currently plays as a defender for Trau FC in the I-League.

== Career ==
=== Air India ===
After spending his youth with Tata Football Academy and Mumbai F.C. Singh signed for Air India FC in the I-League and made his first professional start for the club on 24 November 2011 against Pune F.C. at the Balewadi Sports Complex in which Air India lost 2–0.

=== Eagles ===
On 5 December 2013 it was announced that Ramandeep has signed up with Eagles F.C. of Kerala on loan for 2013–14 season along with Nadong Bhutia, Bijendra Rai, Avinabo Bag, Jagroop Singh, Bisheshwor Singh, Biswajit Saha and Govin Singh. Moreover, IMG-Reliance, the organisers of the proposed IPL-style football tournament Indian Super League, and Eagles F.C. will facilitate a two to six week training stint for the eight players with UK based Reading F.C. Academy.

== Career statistics ==
=== Club ===
Statistics accurate as of 12 May 2013

Club	Season	League		Federation Cup		Durand Cup		AFC		Total	
Club	Season	Apps	Goals	Apps	Goals	Apps	Goals	Apps	Goals	Apps	Goals
Air India	2011–12	14	0	0	0	0	0	—	—	14	0
Air India	2012–13	12	0	2	0	1	0	—	—	15	0
Career total		26	0	2	0	1	0	0	0	29	0

== Honours ==
=== Club ===
Air India

- Durand Cup: 2012
