= Luis Barreto =

Indian footballer

Personal information
- Full name: Luis Xavier Barreto
- Date of birth: 14 October 1980 (age 46)
- Place of birth: Nuvem, Goa, India
- Height: 1.73 m (5 ft 8 in)
- Position: Goalkeeper

Senior career*
Years	Team	Apps	(Gls)
- Dempo
2012–2013	→ Mumbai (loan)	16	(0)
2013–2014	→ Mohammedan (loan)	13	(0)
2014–2018	East Bengal	29	(0)
2014	→ Kerala Blasters FC (loan)	1	(0)
2015	→ FC Goa (loan)	0	(0)
- * Club domestic league appearances and goals as of 2 January 2018

Luis Xavier Barreto (born 14 October 1980) is an Indian former footballer who used to play as a goalkeeper for East Bengal FC in the I-League.

== Career ==
=== Mumbai (loan) ===
Singh made his debut for Churchill Brothers S.C. on 19 January 2013 during an I-League match against East Bengal F.C. at the Salt Lake Stadium in Kolkata, West Bengal in which he came on as an 89th-minute substitute for Steven Dias; Churchill Brothers won the match 3–0.

=== Mohammedan (loan) ===
After the 2012–13 season ended, Barreto signed with IMG-Reliance to join their Indian Super League but due to objection from the I-League clubs in which they said they would not sign any players who joined the ISL it meant that Barreto would be without a club for a long period of time. Then, on 30 October 2013, it was announced that Mohammedan S.C. had broken that barrier when they signed Barreto on loan.

=== East Bengal ===
On 7 June he signed for East Bengal F.C. on a 3-year contract.

=== Kerala Blasters FC ===
Luis Barreto played in the inaugural of the Indian Super League for Kerala Blasters FC.

=== Dempo ===
On 12 November 2019, Dempo SC announced the signing of Luis Barreto.

== Career statistics ==
=== Club ===
As of 7 June 2014

Club	Season	League		Federation Cup		Durand Cup		AFC		Total	
Club	Season	Apps	CS	Apps	CS	Apps	CS	Apps	CS	Apps	CS
Mumbai	2012–13	16	4	0	0	0	0	—	—	16	4
Mohammedan	2013-14	13	0	3	0	0	0	-	-	16	0
Career total		26	4	3	0	0	0	0	0	29!4	
