= Godwin Franco =

Indian footballer (born 1985)

Godwin Diogo Franco
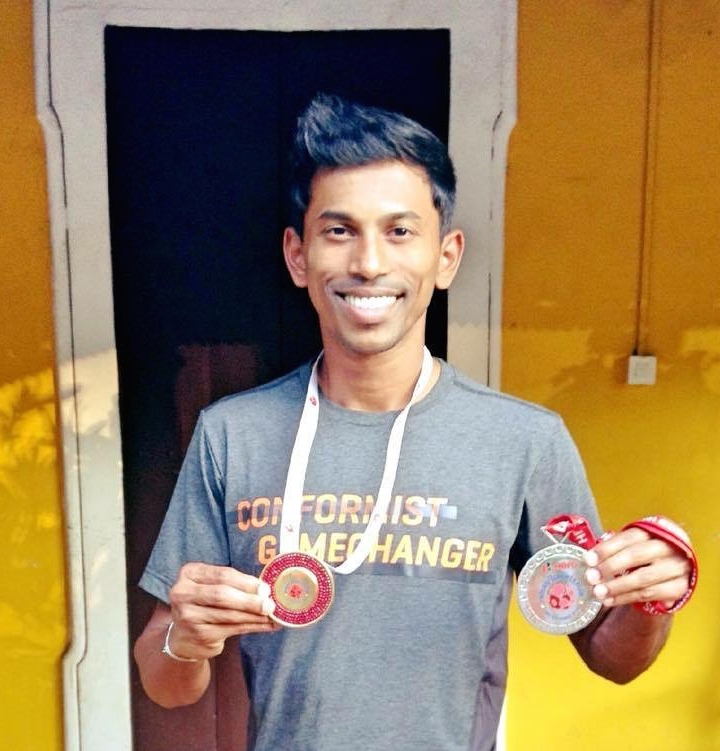
- Godwin Franco with the 2015 ISL Gold medal and 2014 ISL silver medal

Personal information
- Full name: Godwin Diogo Tito Alexander Franco
- Date of birth: 16 February 1985 (age 41)
- Place of birth: Socorro, Goa, India

Youth career
  - 2001: 2001
- 2001–2003: 2001–2003
- 2001 (loan): → 2001 (loan)
- 2003: 2003

Senior career*
Years	Team	Apps	(Gls)
2003–2005	2003–2005		(0)
2005–2006	2005–2006		(0)
2006–2009	2006–2009		
2009–2010	2009–2010		(0)
2010–2014	Dempo		(2)
2014–2015	Kerala Blasters	4	(0)
2015	→ 2015 (loan)		(2)
2015–2016	Chennaiyin	6	(0)
2018	Guadalupe	9	(2)

International career
2003	India U19	3	(0)
2006	Goa-India	2	(0)
- * Club domestic league appearances and goals as of 08:35, 27 September 2015 (UTC)

Godwin Diogo Franco (16 February 1985) is an Indian former professional footballer.

== Early life ==
Godwin Diogo Franco comes from the Parish of Saint Diogo's (Saint Didacus) Catholic Church, Goa.

He played academy football from 2001 to 2003. He played in the then U-19 National Football League in 2001 and in the then U-19 National Football League in 2003.

== Club career ==
=== 2003-2005 ===
He started his professional career in 2003. He played for two seasons, winning the Goa Governors Cup with them. He played in the National Football League, the top-tier football league of India. He played in the Indian Federation Cup.

=== 2005-2006 ===
He played in the National Football League. He played in the Indian Federation Cup.

=== 2006-2009 ===
Godwin won the Goa Professional League and G.F.A. Charity Cup. He played in the Indian Federation Cup. During this time Godwin sustained a major injury in a road accident in 2007 after which he returned in 2009.

=== 2009-2010 ===
Godwin finished 3rd in the I-league, starting 23 times in the midfield. He played in the Indian Federation Cup.

=== 2010-2014 ===
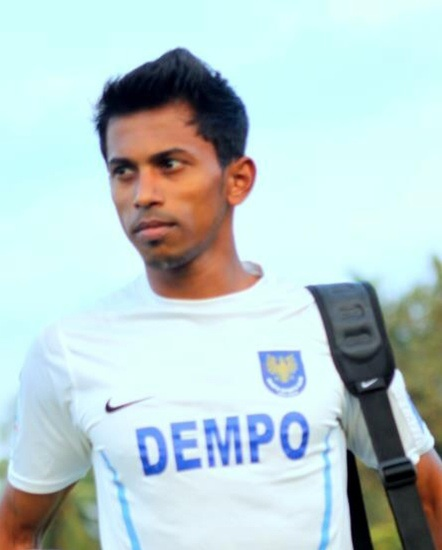
Franco with Dempo SC in 2014

Godwin won 9 trophies including the I-League and the Indian Super Cup 1997–2011. He finished runner up in the 2012 Indian Federation Cup, in which he made an assist for a goal in the final. He played in the 2011 AFC Champions League qualifier. Godwin started in a match that created an all-time record for the highest goals scored by a team in a single match in any of the top tier Indian league football matches, with a 14–0 home win in the I-League. He completed his part in that match with a 100% pass ratio.

=== 2013 ===
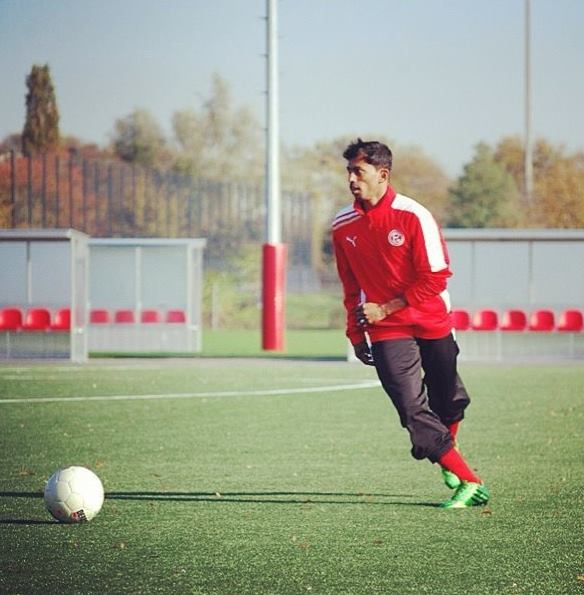
Franco in training with Fortuna Düsseldorf in Germany

Godwin was selected along with fellow Indian player Nirmal Chettri by former German Bundesliga champions Fortuna Düsseldorf, for a trial in November 2013.

=== 2014 ===
Godwin finished 2nd place in the 1st Indian Super League.

=== 2015 ===
After the first five matches of the I League, Godwin started every match scoring two long range goals, finishing 3rd in the I League.

=== 2015 ===
Godwin won the 2015 Indian Super League final in his home state Goa.

=== C. D. Guadalupe ===
On 11 March 2018, Godwin made his debut for Costa Rican side Club Deportivo Guadalupe in the Liga Promérica. He was making a comeback from another major injury from a road accident soon after the 2015 Indian Super League final. He was to sign on loan for the 2016 I-League, but he met with a road accident on the day he did his medical tests for the club. Godwin played for C.D. Guadalupe in 9 matches, qualifying for the first division of that league system. He played in 9 matches, scoring 2 goals from open play and 1 goal from a penalty shoot out.

== International career ==
Godwin played for India in the 2006 at the Lusophony Games in Macau, representing the Indian Olympic Association. Godwin played for the India under-19 team in 2003. Godwin was part of the India national football team camp for the 2010 AFC Challenge Cup. He could not play because of late registration. Godwin was selected as a probable for the India national football team for the 2018 World Cup qualifiers. He was also a part of the India national football team preliminary squad for the 2019 AFC Asian Cup qualifiers.

Godwin played for the U-16, U-19 and U-21 Goa state football teams at National Championships for his state Goa. He captained Goa at the U-21 level. Godwin played for the Goa football team for the National Championship tournament. He was the semi-finalist of the National Championship tournament. Godwin played for the Goa state team vs the Zambia national football team in an invitational match in Goa.

== Honours ==
=== Club ===
2003-2005

- Goa Governors Cup: Winner

2006-2009

- Goa Professional League 2006-2007 Winner
- GFA Charity Cup: Winner 2006

2010-2014.

- I League 2011–12 Winner
- Indian Super Cup 2010 Winner
- Goa Professional League (2): 2010-2011 Winner, 2011-2012 Winner
- Goa Super League: 2011-2012 Winner
- Goa Super Cup: 2011-2012 Winner
- GFA Knock Out Cup: 2011-2012 Winner
- GFA Charity Cup (3): 2010 Winner, 2011 Winner, 2012 Winner
- Indian Federation Cup 2012 Runner Up
- AFC Champions League 2011 Qualifier
- AFC Cup 2011 Pre Quarter Finalist

2014

- Indian Super League 2014 Runner Up

2015

- Indian Super League 2015 Winner

Guadalupe

- Qualified for 1st Division of a football league in Costa Rica

== See also ==
- List of Indian football players in foreign leagues
