= Milagres Gonsalves =

Indian footballer

Personal information
- Date of birth: 24 January 1987 (age 39)
- Place of birth: Tiswadi, Goa, India
- Height: 1.86 m (6 ft 1 in)
- Position: Forward

Team information
- Current team: Dempo
- Number: 8

Youth career
- Sporting Goa
- 2003–2005: Salgaocar

Senior career*
Years	Team	Apps	(Gls)
2005–2014	Salgaocar	255	(91)
2014	Kerala Blasters	13	(1)
2015	Mumbai	33	(19)
2015	Dempo	120	(50)
- * Club domestic league appearances and goals as of 19 November 2015

Milagres Gonsalves (born 24 January 1987) is an Indian footballer who last played for Dempo in the I-League 2nd Division.

== Career ==
Gonsalves began playing football at age nine after joining a summer coaching camp. He played for Don Bosco Oratory, Sao Miguel Taleigao, and Sporting Clube de Goa before joining Salgaocar's under-18 team, which won the under-18 category twice. He was promoted to Salgaocar's senior team at age 17 and led the Goa Professional League scoring chart in his debut season.

During the 2010–11 season, Salgaocar won the I-League and Indian Federation Cup. Gonsalves also represented Goa at the 2005 Lusophony Games in Macau.

== Career statistics ==
=== Club ===
As of 30 May 2015

Club	Season	League			Cup			AFC			Total		
Club	Season	Apps	Goals	Assists	Apps	Goals	Assists	Apps	Goals	Assists	Apps	Goals	Assists
Salgaocar	2012–13	20	4	3	3	0	0	–	–	–	23	4	3
Salgaocar	2013-14	14	1	0	1	0	0	–	–	–	15	1	0
Kerala Blasters FC	2014	13	1	1	–	–	–	–	–	–	13	1	1
Mumbai	2014–15	8	1	0	0	0	0	–	–	–	8	1	0
Career total		46	7	4	4	0	0	0	0	0	50	7	4
