= Eagles FC =

Indian association football club

Eagles
- Full name: Eagles Football Club
- Nickname: Ernakulam Eagles
- Founded: 1956; 70 years ago (as Ernakulam Eagles); 2010; 16 years ago (revival as Eagles FC)
- Ground: Maharaja College Stadium
- Capacity: 25,000
Home colours	Away colours

Eagles Football Club was an Indian professional football club based in Kochi, Kerala, that last competed in the Kerala Premier League. It is one of the oldest football clubs in the state of Kerala. Currently the club runs only its youth academy, competing in the Kerala Youth League.

== History ==
The original Ernakulam Eagles was formed in 1955 in Kochi by a group of football-loving students of St. Albert's High School and NJ Joseph, their mathematics teacher, and an ardent sports-loving businessman.

Varghese Chelatt, then manager of the school, became the first President of the club while Imbayi Mather became secretary.

Ernakulam Eagles were active until the late 1990s, but the professional commitments of its members made the administration of the club difficult. They then folded the club due to those reasons.

The team then announced their second coming in October 2010 as Kochi Eagles Football Club and made it clear that they have great plans to make history in keeping with their lineage. The team is now owned by Ziqitza Sports Management Pvt Ltd.

Eagles F.C. entered into an agreement with Reading F.C. in April 2013 where Reading would send coaches and identify players for training at the Madejski Stadium. The aim was to identify young talent from Kochi in the age group around 13.

Eagles FC got an entry into the Federation Cup 2014 after Langsning FC pulled out of the campaign. Eagles were pitted in Group A against the likes of defending I-League champions Churchill Brothers FC, runners-up Pune FC and Kolkata-based United SC. Eagles FC drew their match against Pune FC by 1–1 and then defeated United SC by 2 goals to 1. Eventually, they finished second in the group stages.

== Honours ==
- Kerala Premier League
  - Champions (1): 2013–14
