= 2014 ISL Inaugural International Draft =

Indian association football draft

ISL International Draft
- Date: 21 August 2014
- Location: Mumbai

The 2014 ISL Inaugural International Draft is the second draft in the Indian Super League, the new domestic football league in India. The draft featured 49 foreign players who were selected by the eight teams in the ISL.

The draft took place on 21 August 2014 in Mumbai.

== Players available to draft ==
International Players
Player	Last club	Position	Age
(Argentina) Diego Nadaya	(Argentina) Almirante Brown	FW	24
(Armenia) Apoula Edel	(Israel) Hapoel Tel Aviv	GK	28
(Brazil) Bruno Pelissari	(Brazil) Atlético Paranaense	MF	21
(Brazil) Erwin Spitzner	(Brazil) Atlético Paranaense	DF	20
(Brazil) Guilherme Batata	(Brazil) Atlético Paranaense	MF	22
(Brazil) Gustavo Marmentini	(Brazil) Atlético Paranaense	MF	20
(Brazil) Pedro Gusmao	(Brazil) Atlético Paranaense	FW	22
(Burkina Faso) Saïdou Panandétiguiri	(South Africa) Chippa United	DF	30
(Canada) Iain Hume	(England) Fleetwood Town	FW	30
(Colombia) Andrés González	(Colombia) Junior	DF	30
(Colombia) Jairo Suárez	(Colombia) Santa Fe	DF	29
(Colombia) Luis Yanes	(Colombia) Atlético Bucaramanga	FW	31
(Colombia) Omar Andrés Rodríguez	(Colombia) Once Caldas	MF	33
(Czech Republic) Jakub Podaný	(Czech Republic) Sparta Prague	MF	27
(Czech Republic) Jan Šeda	(Czech Republic) Mladá Boleslav	GK	28
(Czech Republic) Jan Štohanzl	(Czech Republic) Mladá Boleslav	MF	29
(Czech Republic) Marek Čech	(Czech Republic) Sparta Prague	GK	38
(Czech Republic) Miroslav Slepička	(Czech Republic) 1. FK Příbram	FW	32
(Czech Republic) Pavel Eliáš	(Czech Republic) Jablonec	MF	27
(Czech Republic) Tomáš Josl	(Czech Republic) Vysočina Jihlava	DF	29
(England) Michael Chopra	(England) Blackpool	FW	30
(Equatorial Guinea) Iván Bolado	(Spain) Real Avilés	FW	25
(France) Bernard Mendy	(France) Brest	DF	32
(France) Cédric Hengbart	(France) Ajaccio	DF	34
(France) Gennaro Bracigliano	(France) Marseille	GK	35
(France) Raphaël Romey	(France) Bastia	DF	26
(France) Sylvain Monsoreau	(France) Troyes	DF	33
(France) Youness Bengelloun	(France) Mulhouse	DF	31
(Greece) Ilias Pollalis	(Greece) Glyfada	DF	21
(Portugal) André Preto	(Portugal) Vitória Guimarães	GK	21
(Portugal) Edgar Marcelino	(Oman) Al-Seeb	MF	29
(Portugal) Henrique Dinis	(Portugal) Vitória Guimarães	DF	24
(Portugal) Miguel Herlein	(Portugal) Vilaverdense	FW	24
(Martinique) Grégory Arnolin	(Portugal) Paços Ferreira	DF	34
(Senegal) Massamba Sambou	(France) Châteauroux	DF	27
(Spain) Arnal	(Spain) Alcorcón	FW	33
(Spain) Bruno Herrero Arias	(Spain) Girona	MF	29
(Spain) Cristian Hidalgo	(Israel) Bnei Sakhnin	MF	30
(Spain) Eduardo Silva	(Spain) Alcoyano	FW	24
(Spain) Jofre Mateu	(Spain) Girona	MF	34
(Spain) Javier Fernández	(Spain) Algeciras	MF	26
(Spain) Victor Herrero Forcada	(Greece) Kallithea	MF	28
(South Korea) Do Dong-hyun	(Japan) Gifu	MF	20
(South Korea) Park Kwang-il	(Japan) Matsumoto Yamaga	MF	23
(Sweden) Bojan Djordjic	(Sweden) Vasalund	MF	32

== Draft Selection ==
=== Round 1 ===
The first round saw Pune go first, with them selecting Bruno Cirillo as the first ever foreign player in ISL history.

Pick #	ISL team	Player	Position
1	FC Pune City	(Italy) Bruno Cirillo	Defender
2	Atlético de Kolkata	(Spain) Borja Fernández	Midfielder
3	Kerala Blasters FC	(England) Michael Chopra	Forward
4	Mumbai City FC	(Argentina) Diego Nadaya	Forward
5	North East United FC	(Zambia) Isaac Chansa	Midfielder
6	Chennai	(France) Bernard Mendy	Defender
7	Goa	(Czech Republic) Miroslav Slepička	Forward
8	Delhi Dynamos FC	(Denmark) Mads Junker	Forward

=== Round 2 ===
Pick #	ISL team	Player	Position
1	Delhi Dynamos FC	(Denmark) Morten Skoubo	Forward
2	Goa	(Czech Republic) Jan Šeda	Goalkeeper
3	Chennai	(Spain) Cristian Hidalgo	Midfielder
4	North East United FC	(Trinidad and Tobago) Cornell Glen	Forward
5	Mumbai City FC	(Czech Republic) Jan Štohanzl	Midfielder
6	Kerala Blasters FC	(Canada) Iain Hume	Forward
7	Atlético de Kolkata	(Spain) Jofre Mateu	Midfielder
8	FC Pune City	(Italy) Emanuele Belardi	Goalkeeper

=== Round 3 ===
Pick #	ISL team	Player	Position
1	Goa	(Portugal) Bruno Pinheiro	Midfielder
2	Delhi Dynamos FC	(Spain) Bruno Herrero Arias	Midfielder
3	FC Pune City	(Spain) Iván Bolado	Forward
4	Atlético de Kolkata	(Spain) Josemi	Defender
5	Kerala Blasters FC	(Spain) Victor Herrero Forcada	Midfielder
6	Mumbai City FC	(Spain) Javier Fernandez	Midfielder
7	North East United FC	(Senegal) Massamba Sambou	Defender
8	Chennai	(France) Gennaro Bracigliano	Goalkeeper

=== Round 4 ===
Pick #	ISL team	Player	Position
1	Chennai	(Sweden) Bojan Djordjic	Midfielder
2	North East United FC	(South Korea) Do Dong-Hyun	Forward
3	Mumbai City FC	(Czech Republic) Pavel Čmovš	Defender
4	Kerala Blasters FC	(Brazil) Erwin Spitzner	Defender
5	Atlético de Kolkata	(Spain) Arnal Llibert	Forward
6	FC Pune City	(Burkina Faso) Saïdou Panandétiguiri	Midfielder
7	Delhi Dynamos FC	(Brazil) Gustavo Marmentini	Midfielder
8	Goa	(France) Youness Bengelloun	Defender

=== Round 5 ===
Pick #	ISL team	Player	Position
1	North East United FC	(Brazil) Guilherme Batata	Midfielder
2	Chennai	(Brazil) Bruno Pelissari	Midfielder
3	Goa	(Portugal) Miguel Herlein	Forward
4	Delhi Dynamos FC	(Czech Republic) Marek Čech	Goalkeeper
5	FC Pune City	(Colombia) Omar Andrés Rodríguez	Midfielder
6	Atlético de Kolkata	(France) Sylvain Monsoreau	Defender
7	Kerala Blasters FC	(Brazil) Pedro Gusmão	Forward
8	Mumbai City FC	(France) Johan Letzelter	Defender

=== Round 6 ===
Pick #	ISL team	Player	Position
1	Mumbai City FC	(Portugal) André Preto	Goalkeeper
2	Kerala Blasters FC	(France) Cedric Hengbart	Defender
3	Atlético de Kolkata	(Czech Republic) Jakub Podaný	Midfielder
4	FC Pune City	(Colombia) Andrés González	Defender
5	Delhi Dynamos FC	(Czech Republic) Pavel Eliáš	Midfielder
6	Goa	(France) Gregory Arnolin	Defender
7	Chennai	(Colombia) Jairo Suárez	Defender
8	NorthEast United FC	(Czech Republic) Tomáš Josl	Defender

=== Round 7 ===
Pick #	ISL team	Player	Position
1	Kerala Blasters FC	(France) Raphaël Romey	Defender
2	Mumbai City FC	(Greece) Ilias Pollalis	Defender
3	NorthEast United FC	(Colombia) Luis Yanes	Forward
4	Chennai	(Spain) Eduardo Silva	Forward
5	Goa	(Portugal) Edgar Marcelino	Midfielder
6	Delhi Dynamos FC	(Portugal) Henrique Dinis	Defender
7	FC Pune City	(South Korea) Park Kwang-il	Defender
8	Atlético de Kolkata	(Armenia) Apoula Edel	Goalkeeper
