= 2014 Indian Super League final =

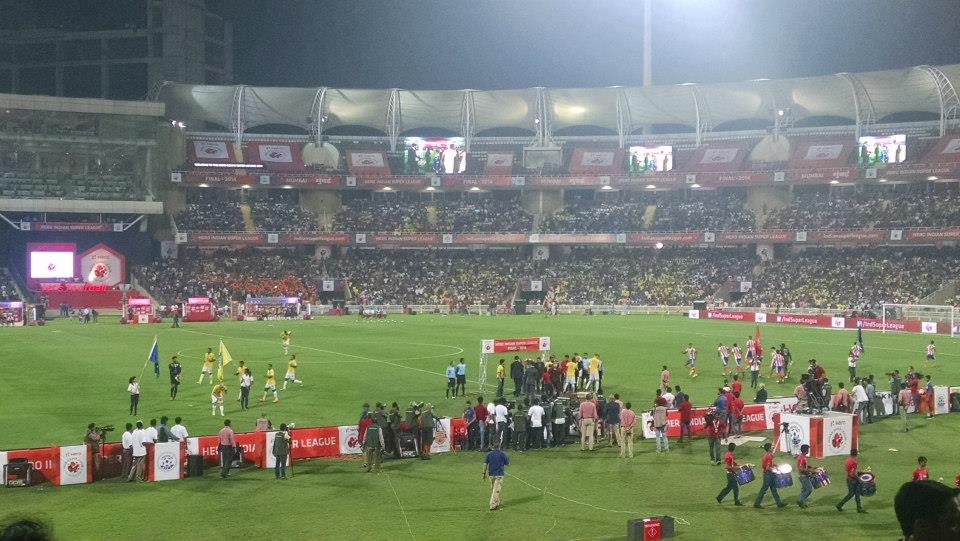
- The final venue, DY Patil Stadium, before the match
- Event: 2014 Indian Super League season
ATK	Kerala Blasters
(India)	(India)
1	0
- Date: 20 December 2014
- Venue: DY Patil Stadium, Navi Mumbai
- Man of the Match: Mohammed Rafique
- Referee: Ravshan Irmatov (Uzbekistan)
- Attendance: 36,484
- Weather: Clear Night; 29 °C (84 °F); 48% humidity

The 2014 Indian Super League final was an association football match between the Kerala Blasters and ATK played on 20 December 2014, at the DY Patil Stadium in Navi Mumbai. The match was the final match to determine the inaugural champions of the Indian Super League for the 2014 season.

The Kerala Blasters had qualified for the final through defeating the first-place regular season side, Chennaiyin, 4–3 on aggregate. ATK qualified after defeating Goa in a penalty shoot-out 4–2. Prior to the final, during the regular season, both sides played to a 1–1 draw at the Salt Lake Stadium while Kerala Blasters won the return match 2–1 in Kochi.

ATK won the final to win the inaugural title of the league, with late substitute Mohammed Rafique scoring the only goal in added time.

== Road to the final ==
The Indian Super League is a franchise league started between IMG-Reliance and STAR Sports with the objective of making football one of the main sports in India, as well as make it a known name in the world of football. The 2014 edition was the inaugural season of the Indian Super League.

The Indian Super League, which started its inaugural season with eight franchises, acted in a round-robin format, with each team facing each other twice, home and away. The top four teams at the end of the 14-game regular season would qualify for the play-offs. The play-offs would feature a two-legged semi-final which would pit the first place team against the fourth place team, while second and third would face off against each other. The final would then be a one-legged affair at a neutral venue.

Pos	Team	Pld	W	D	L	GF	GA	GD	Pts	Qualification
1	Chennaiyin	14	6	5	3	24	20	+4	23	Advance to ISL Play-offs
2	Goa	14	6	4	4	21	12	+9	22	Advance to ISL Play-offs
3	Atlético de Kolkata (C)	14	4	7	3	16	13	+3	19	Advance to ISL Play-offs
4	Kerala Blasters	14	5	4	5	9	11	−2	19	Advance to ISL Play-offs
5	Delhi Dynamos	14	4	6	4	16	14	+2	18	
6	Pune City	14	4	4	6	12	17	−5	16	
7	Mumbai City	14	4	4	6	12	21	−9	16	
8	NorthEast United	14	3	6	5	11	13	−2	15	

Source: Soccerway
Rules for classification: 1) points; 2) goal difference; 3) number of goals scored
(C) Champions

=== Kerala Blasters ===
The Kerala Blasters played their first ever game in the Indian Super League on 13 October 2014 against NorthEast United at the Indira Gandhi Athletic Stadium. They lost the match 0–1 after Koke found the net in the 45th minute. It took till 26 October 2014, the Blasters' third game, before they gained their first ever point in the Indian Super League. It was against their future final opponents, ATK, at the Salt Lake Stadium. Iain Hume scored the equalizer for the Blasters after Baljit Sahni gave the Kolkata side the lead. In the next game, four days later, the Blasters recorded their first ever victory against Pune City at the Balewadi Sports Complex. David Trezeguet gave Pune City the lead in the 15th minute before Chinadorai Sabeeth scored a 41st-minute equalizer. Penn Orji scored the winner for the Blasters in the 65th minute as they ran out with a 2–1 scoreline.

The team played their first home match of the season on 6 November 2014 against Goa. A goal from Milagres Gonsalves helped the Kerala Blasters win 1–0 in front of over 55,000 fans. In the end, the Kerala Blasters managed to just qualify for the finals of the Indian Super League when they defeated Pune City 1–0 at home with Iain Hume scoring his fourth goal of the season.

In the semi-finals, the Kerala Blasters were set to take on the regular season winners, Chennaiyin. The first leg took place at home for the Kerala Blasters, the Jawaharlal Nehru Stadium in Kochi, on 13 December 2014. The match could not have been any better for the Kerala Blasters as goals from Ishfaq Ahmed, Iain Hume, and Sushanth Mathew gave the Kerala Blasters a 3–0 advantage heading to Chennai. The second leg took place three days later at the Jawaharlal Nehru Stadium in Chennai. Despite heading into the game leading 3–0 on aggregate, the Blasters managed to concede three goals to Chennaiyin in the second leg and thus bring the game into extra-time. Just as it looked like the game was going to be settled in a penalty shoot-out, the Blasters managed to steal the tie when Stephen Pearson scored in the 117th minute and thus help the Kerala Blasters win 4–3 on aggregate.

=== Atlético de Kolkata ===
Atlético de Kolkata played in the first ever Indian Super League match on 12 October 2014 against Mumbai City at the Salt Lake Stadium. Goals from Fikru Teferra, Borja Fernández, and Arnal helped Kolkata win the inaugural match 3–0. They played their first road match four days later against NorthEast United at the Indira Gandhi Athletic Stadium. Kolkata won the match 2–0 with goals coming from Fikru Teferra and Jakub Podaný.

ATK qualified for the play-offs after they drew Goa at the Salt Lake Stadium 1–1 on 10 December 2014. Edgar Marcelino scored first to give Goa the lead before Fikru scored the equalizer for Kolkata. In the semi-finals, Atlético de Kolkata once again took on Goa. The first leg at the Salt Lake Stadium ended in a 0–0 draw. The second leg at the Fatorda Stadium also ended 0–0 and after the tie could not be settled in extra-time that meant the game went into penalty-kicks. Atlético de Kolkata won the shoot-out 4–2 after André Santos and Zohib Islam Amiri missed their penalties for Goa and Kolkata converted all four of theirs.

== Pre-match ==
=== Officials ===
Uzbekistani referee, Ravshan Irmatov, was selected as the referee for the final. He had previously officiated the match between the Kerala Blasters and Atlético de Kolkata almost a month before the final on 21 November. He booked seven players that night as the Kerala Blasters won 2–1.

=== Venue ===
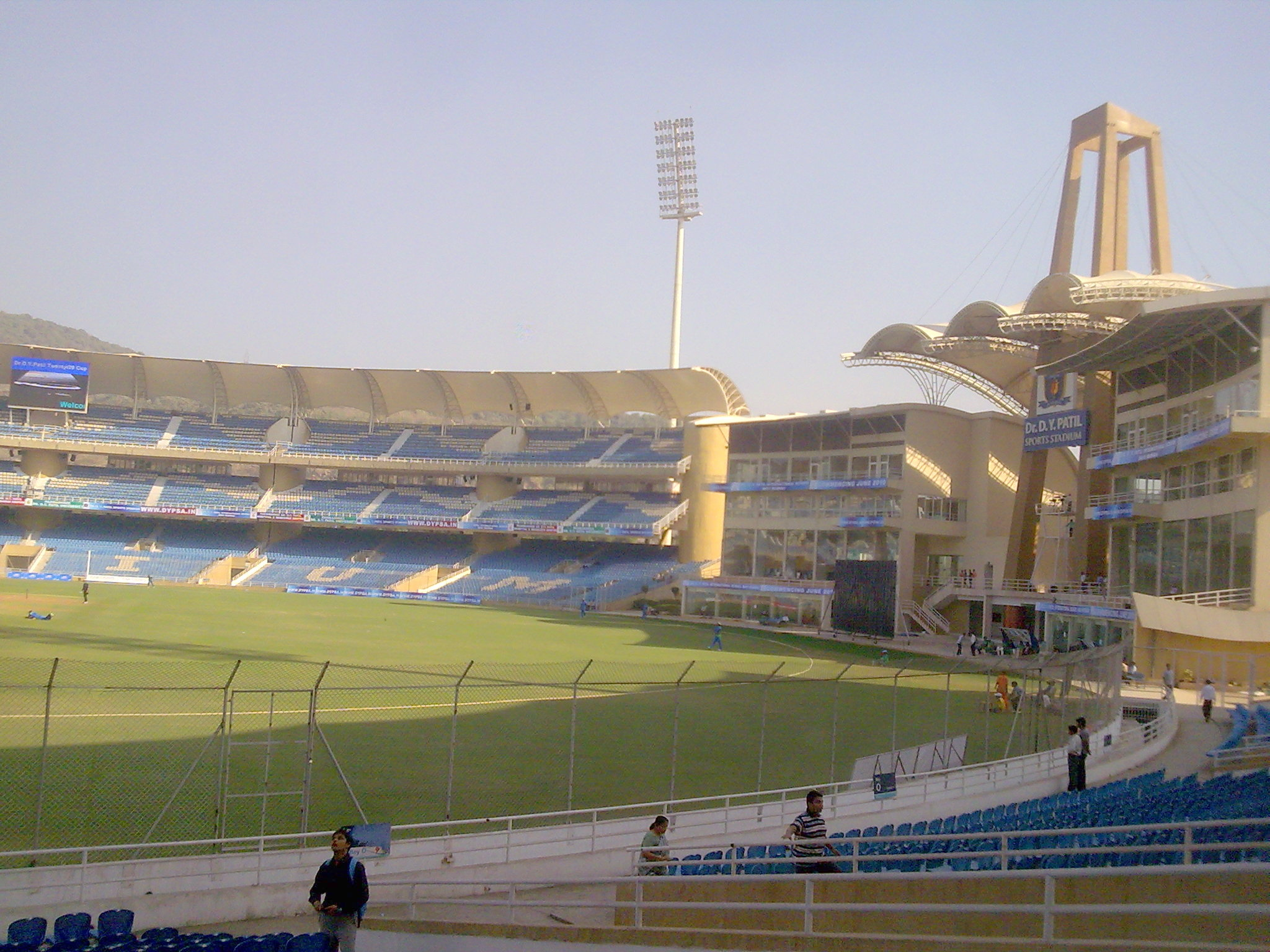
DY Patil Stadium in Navi Mumbai

In early December 2014 it was announced that the DY Patil Stadium in Navi Mumbai would host the final of the Indian Super League. It was also announced that tickets for the final would be available online from 8 December 2014. On 18 December 2014, one day after the semi-finals had concluded, it was reported that a packed crowd was expected for the final. According to the owner of the DY Patil Stadium, Vijay Patil, the stands during the Indian Super League final will be just as full as they were during the 2008 Indian Premier League final.

Due to the strong celebrity influence expected at the Indian Super League final it was reported that over 250 police officers would be in attendance at the stadium to maintain order of the crowd. It was also reported that over 150 personnel would be brought in to man the streets outside the stadium.

=== Analysis ===
Going into the final, former India national team captain, Baichung Bhutia, predicted Atlético de Kolkata to go on and win the final.

Before this match, the Kerala Blasters and Atlético de Kolkata had played each other twice during the regular season. Their first match against each other, on 26 October 2014, ended in a 1–1 draw at the Salt Lake Stadium. Baljit Sahni scored the opening goal in the 22nd minute before Iain Hume equalized for the Blasters to earn the Blasters their first point of the season. In the second game, on 21 November 2014, it was the Kerala Blasters who came out on top as 2–1 winners. Iain Hume and Pedro Gusmão gave the Blasters the 2–0 lead before Fikru Teferra scored the consolation for Kolkata.

== Match ==
=== Team selection ===
Coming into the match, the Kerala Blasters made a couple necessary defensive changes from the squad that faced Chennaiyin in the semi-finals. David James replaced the injured Sandip Nandy in goal, while Saumik Dey and Nirmal Chettri replaced the suspended pair of Jamie McAllister and Gurwinder Singh in the middle of defense. Atlético de Kolkata head coach, Antonio Lopez Habas, meanwhile decided to bench the team's marquee player, Luis García, and instead started Arnal in central midfield. Habas also decided to switch to playing four defenders instead of three, which meant that Kingshuk Debnath started the match while Lester Fernandez moved to the bench.

=== Summary ===
The first opportunity of the match came in the fifth minute when Kerala Blasters midfielder, Iain Hume, put Michael Chopra through on goal only for Josemi to deny Chopra with a last-minute tackle. The Blasters then had the second realistic chance of the match five minutes later when Pulga received the ball in the box from Saumik Dey but his shot went out for a corner after a deflection off Atlético's Borja Fernández. The pressure continued to mount on Atlético de Kolkata as their goalkeeper Apoula Edel was forced into action; first he had to punch away a direct free-kick from Stephen Pearson before Ishfaq Ahmed's shot moments later was caught by the keeper. Atlético de Kolkata had their first major chance of the match in the 26th minute when Arnal put Mohammed Rafi through on goal, only for Nirmal Chettri to make a last-ditch tackle to keep the score level. The score would remain 0–0 going into half time.

Atlético de Kolkata had the first major opportunity of the second half when Jakub Podaný crossed the ball into the box with both Baljit Sahni and Arnal looking to head it in before David James came out to catch the ball. The Kerala Blasters soon had three chances in three minutes but could not convert any of those into goals. Just after the 60th minute, Kerala Blasters defender Sandesh Jhingan almost headed the ball into his own net while trying to clear it. The Kerala Blasters continued to have the most chances throughout the match, which was compounded in the last minute of regulation time when Michael Chopra had his point blank range shot saved by Apoula Edel. Four minutes later, in the final minute of stoppage time, Atlético de Kolkata substitute Mohammed Rafique headed home a corner from Podaný to win the match and the cup.

=== Details ===
20 December 2014
19:00 IST

Kerala Blasters	0–1	Atlético de Kolkata
	Report	Rafique 90+5'

DY Patil Stadium, Mumbai
Attendance: 36,484

Kerala Blasters	Atlético de Kolkata

GK	70	(England) David James
RB	5	(India) Nirmal Chettri
CB	15	(India) Sandesh Jhingan
CB	32	(Republic of Ireland) Colin Falvey
LB	29	(India) Saumik Dey	(substituted off) 90+3'
DM	14	(India) Mehtab Hossain
RM	11	(India) Ishfaq Ahmed
AM	85	(Spain) Victor Pulga	(substituted off) 78'
LM	25	(Scotland) Stephen Pearson
CF	10	(Canada) Iain Hume (c)
CF	8	(England) Michael Chopra
Substitutes:
GK	24	(India) Sandip Nandy
DF	22	(France) Raphaël Romey
DF	44	(Brazil) Erwin Spitzner
MF	6	(India) Renedy Singh
MF	18	(Nigeria) Penn Orji	(substituted on) 78'
MF	21	(India) Godwin Franco
FW	7	(India) Sushanth Mathew	(substituted on) 90+3'
FW	9	(Brazil) Pedro Gusmão
FW	88	(India) Milagres Gonsalves
Manager:
(England) David James

GK	25	(Armenia) Apoula Edel
RB	4	(India) Kingshuk Debnath
CB	5	(India) Arnab Mondal
CB	17	(Spain) Josemi (c)
LB	21	(Czech Republic) Jakub Podaný
DM	8	(Spain) Borja Fernández
DM	23	(Botswana) Ofentse Nato
CM	24	(Spain) Arnal
RM	6	(India) Baljit Sahni
LM	15	(India) Sanju Pradhan
CF	14	(India) Mohammed Rafi	(substituted off) 74'
Substitutes:
GK	1	(India) Subhasish Roy Chowdhury
DF	3	(India) Nallappan Mohanraj
MF	22	(India) Lester Fernandez
MF	10	(Spain) Luis García
MF	11	(Spain) Jofre
MF	18	(India) Mohammed Rafique	(substituted on) 74'
FW	7	(India) Cavin Lobo
Manager:
(Spain) Antonio López Habas

Hero of the match

- (India) Mohammed Rafique (Atlético de Kolkata)

Match officials

- Assistant referees:
  - Abdukhamidullo Rasulov (Uzbekistan)
  - Bakhadyr Kochkarov (Kyrgyzstan)
- Fourth official: C. R. Srikrishna (India)

Match rules

- 90 minutes.
- 30 minutes of extra time if necessary.
- Penalty shoot-out if scores still level.
- Seven named substitutes, of which three may be used.

== Post-match ==
Atlético de Kolkata head coach Habas lauded his players after the final: "I must thank my players for they have been magnificent. I cannot ask them for anything more, for they have given me the ultimate gift." He also praised his backroom staff: "I must thank my entire support staff, for without them, I would not have been able to function. The owners have been fantastic and have supported us through thick and thin. This title is for the fans as they have been our strength." Habas was also delighted that the match was won from a goal scored by an Indian player, saying, "I think it is marvellous that Rafique got the winning goal. It is fantastic that an Indian player settled the contest."

Despite the defeat, David James expressed his opinions over them match while also suggesting that the match would most likely be his last in the Indian Super League. After scoring the winning goal for his side, Mohammed Rafique was very happy while also singing the praises of his coach, saying, "I cannot describe what I am feeling in words," said the midfielder. "I would like to thank my coach, who had faith in me. It was he who decided to bring me on and what happened next was surreal. People dream of scoring in a final and I am very fortunate that I got to experience that in the flesh."
