= 2014 Indian Super League playoffs =

Tournament details
- Country: India
- Teams: 4

Final positions
- Champions: Atlético de Kolkata
- Runners-up: Kerala Blasters

Tournament statistics
- Matches played: 5
- Goals scored: 8 (1.6 per match)

The 2014 Indian Super League playoffs were the first edition of the playoffs series that takes place after the Indian Super League regular season. The tournament began on 13 December and culminated on 20 December, with the first ever ISL final.

Atlético de Kolkata became the inaugural champions after defeating the Kerala Blasters in the final, 1–0. The goal was scored by Mohammed Rafique in the last minute of stoppage time.

== Format ==
After a fourteen game regular season, the top four teams in the table qualify for the playoffs. The first place team at the end of the regular season played the fourth place team while the second place team took on the third. The semi-final round was played over two-legs while the final is played over one leg at a neutral venue.

== Qualification ==
| Pos | Team | Pld | W | D | L | GF | GA | GD | Pts | Qualification |
|---|---|---|---|---|---|---|---|---|---|---|
| 1 | Chennaiyin | 14 | 6 | 5 | 3 | 24 | 20 | +4 | 23 | Advance to ISL Play-offs |
| 2 | Goa | 14 | 6 | 4 | 4 | 21 | 12 | +9 | 22 | Advance to ISL Play-offs |
| 3 | Atlético de Kolkata (C) | 14 | 4 | 7 | 3 | 16 | 13 | +3 | 19 | Advance to ISL Play-offs |
| 4 | Kerala Blasters | 14 | 5 | 4 | 5 | 9 | 11 | −2 | 19 | Advance to ISL Play-offs |
| 5 | Delhi Dynamos | 14 | 4 | 6 | 4 | 16 | 14 | +2 | 18 | |
| 6 | Pune City | 14 | 4 | 4 | 6 | 12 | 17 | −5 | 16 | |
| 7 | Mumbai City | 14 | 4 | 4 | 6 | 12 | 21 | −9 | 16 | |
| 8 | NorthEast United | 14 | 3 | 6 | 5 | 11 | 13 | −2 | 15 | |

Source: Soccerway
Rules for classification: 1) points; 2) goal difference; 3) number of goals scored
(C) Champions

== Bracket ==
Semi–finals
4 | Kerala Blasters | 3 | 1 | 4
1 | Chennaiyin | 0 | 3 | 3
3 | Atlético de Kolkata (pen.) | 0 | 0 | 0 (4)
2 | Goa | 0 | 0 | 0 (2)

Final
4 | Kerala Blasters | 0
3 | Atlético de Kolkata | 1

== Schedule ==
=== Semi-finals ===
| Team 1 | Agg. | Team 2 | 1st leg | 2nd leg |
|---|---|---|---|---|
| Kerala Blasters (India) | 4–3 | (India) Chennaiyin | 3–0 | 3–1 (a.e.t.) |
| Atlético de Kolkata (India) | 0–0 (4–2 p) | (India) Goa | 0–0 | 0–0 (a.e.t.) |

==== Leg 1 ====
13 December
19:00 IST

| Kerala Blasters | 3–0 | Chennaiyin |
|---|---|---|
| Ahmed 27'; Hume 29'; Mathew 90'+3' | Report |

Jawaharlal Nehru Stadium, Kochi
Attendance: 60,900
Referee: Pranjal Banerjee (India)

14 December
19:00 IST

| Atlético de Kolkata | 0–0 | Goa |
|---|---|---|
| | Report |

Salt Lake Stadium, Kolkata
Attendance: 53,173
Referee: Santosh Kumar (India)

==== Leg 2 ====
16 December
19:00 IST

| Chennaiyin | 3–1 (a.e.t.) | Kerala Blasters |
|---|---|---|
| Silvestre 42'; Jhingan 76' (o.g.); Lalpekhlua 90' | Report | Pearson 117' |

Jawaharlal Nehru Stadium, Chennai
Attendance: 25,317
Referee: Tejas Nagvenkar (India)

Kerala Blasters won 4–3 on aggregate

17 December
19:00 IST

| Goa | 0–0 (a.e.t.) | Atlético de Kolkata |
|---|---|---|
| | Report |
Penalties
| Santos (penalty missed); Özbey (penalty scored); Amiri (penalty missed); Miranda (penalty scored) | 2–4 | (penalty scored) Josemi; (penalty scored) Rafi; (penalty scored) Jofre; (penalty scored) Fernández |

Fatorda Stadium, Goa
Attendance: 19,012
Referee: Ravshan Irmatov (Uzbekistan)

Atlético de Kolkata 0–0 Goa on aggregate.
Atlético de Kolkata won 4–2 on penalties.

=== Final ===
20 December
19:00 IST

| Kerala Blasters | 0–1 | Atlético de Kolkata |
|---|---|---|
| | Report | Rafique 90+5' |

DY Patil Stadium, Navi Mumbai
Attendance: 36,484
Referee: Ravshan Irmatov (Uzbekistan)

== See also ==
- 2014–15 in Indian football
- 2014 Indian Super League season
