= Josemi =

Spanish footballer (born 1979)

Personal information
- Full name: José Miguel González Rey
- Date of birth: 15 November 1979 (age 46)
- Place of birth: Torremolinos, Spain
- Height: 1.83 m (6 ft 0 in)
- Position: Defender

Youth career
- Torremolinos

Senior career*
Years	Team	Apps	(Gls)
1997–1998	Torremolinos		
1998–2001	Málaga B	67	(1)
2001–2004	Málaga	93	(0)
2004–2006	Liverpool	21	(0)
2006–2008	Villarreal	32	(0)
2008–2010	Mallorca	53	(1)
2010–2011	Iraklis	26	(0)
2011–2012	Cartagena	18	(0)
2012–2013	Levadiakos	25	(0)
2013–2014	Skoda Xanthi	16	(0)
2014–2015	Atlético Kolkata	20	(0)
Total		371	(2)
Medal record
UEFA Champions League
Gold medal – first place	2004–05
Football League Cup
Silver medal – second place	2004–05
UEFA Super Cup
Gold medal – first place	2005
Indian Super League
Gold medal – first place	2014
- * Club domestic league appearances and goals

José Miguel González Rey (born 15 November 1979), known as Josemi, is a Spanish former footballer. Mainly a right back, he also played as a central defender.

He appeared in 178 La Liga matches over nine seasons (one goal), with Málaga, Villarreal and Mallorca, also representing Liverpool for one and a half seasons where he won two major titles including the 2005 Champions League. He later competed professionally in Greece, before moving to the newly formed Indian Super League.

== Club career ==
=== Early career ===
Born in Torremolinos, Málaga, Josemi started his professional career at Málaga CF, arriving from local amateurs Torremolinos Club de Fútbol in 1998. He started appearing for his new club with the reserve team, in Tercera División.

After one match in 2000–01's closer, a 0–4 away loss against Deportivo de La Coruña on 17 June 2001, Josemi went on to become an essential defensive element for the Andalusia side, helping them to the 2002 UEFA Intertoto Cup and soon attracting interest from bigger European clubs.

=== Liverpool ===
Subsequently, Josemi became Rafael Benítez's first signing as Liverpool manager, for £2 million in the summer of 2004. He played 15 games in the Premier League in his debut season and, after an initial run, he was sent off in the club's 4–2 victory at Fulham on 16 October 2004, his subsequent ban leading to Steve Finnan re-establishing himself as first-choice right-back.

Josemi made seven appearances (five starts) in the Reds' victorious campaign in the UEFA Champions League, but struggled to make the substitutes bench in the knockout stages, and also lost his place in the first half of 2005–06, suggesting he would soon leave Anfield.

=== Return to Spain ===
On 29 December 2005, it was announced that Liverpool and Villarreal CF had agreed to swap Josemi and Jan Kromkamp in the January 2006 transfer window. He made a good start and appeared in 22 league matches in 2006–07, but only took part in only one the following season for the eventual La Liga runners-up.

In July 2008, Josemi signed for RCD Mallorca. He scored his first goal as a professional on 23 November, in a 2–2 home draw against former owners Málaga. In his second year he was challenged by new signing Felipe Mattioni, but ended up contributing with 28 games as the Balearic Islands side finished fifth and qualified for the UEFA Europa League.

=== Later years ===
At nearly 31, Josemi left Spain for the second time in August 2010, signing a three-year contract with Iraklis. After only one season – which brought Super League Greece relegation due to irregularities – however, he returned to his country and joined FC Cartagena in Segunda División, on a two-year deal.

On 21 August 2014, after two seasons in Greece with Levadiakos F.C. and Skoda Xanthi respectively, Josemi was a third-round draft pick for Atlético de Kolkata in the inaugural draft of the Indian Super League draft. He made his debut in the competition in the opening match, starting a 3–0 home victory over Mumbai City FC, and formed a formidable stopper partnership with Arnab Mondal during his first year, acting as team captain in the final win over the Kerala Blasters in the absence of countryman Luis García, where he also won the Fittest Player of the Match award.

Following his successful debut season, on 12 June 2015 Josemi renewed his contract with Atlético for one more year. He was released on 13 November, after being ruled out for the remainder of the campaign due to injury.

On 22 September 2016, after almost a year with a club, 36-year-old Josemi announced his retirement. In February 2017, he returned to Málaga as match delegate.

== Club statistics ==
Club	Season	League			Cup		Continental		Other		Total	
Club	Season	Division	Apps	Goals	Apps	Goals	Apps	Goals	Apps	Goals	Apps	Goals
Málaga	2000–01	La Liga	1	0	0	0	—				1	0
Málaga	2001–02	La Liga	23	0	2	0	—				25	0
Málaga	2002–03	La Liga	32	0	2	0	14 (Note: 8 appearances in UEFA Cup and 6 appearances in UEFA Intertoto Cup)	0	—		48	0
Málaga	2003–04	La Liga	37	0	4	0	—				41	0
Málaga	Total		93	0	8	0	14	0	—		115	0
Liverpool	2004–05	Premier League	15	0	1	0	7 (Note: Appearances in UEFA Champions League)	0	—		23	0
Liverpool	2005–06	Premier League	6	0	0	0	4	0	2 (Note: 1 appearance in UEFA Super Cup and 1 appearance in FIFA Club World Cup)	0	12	0
Liverpool	Total		21	0	1	0	11	0	2	0	35	0
Villarreal	2005–06	La Liga	9	0	1	0	—				10	0
Villarreal	2006–07	La Liga	22	0	4	0	1 (Note: Appearance in UEFA Intertoto Cup)	0	—		27	0
Villarreal	2007–08	La Liga	1	0	4	0	3 (Note: Appearance in UEFA Europa League)	0	—		8	0
Villarreal	Total		32	0	9	0	4	0	—		45	0
Mallorca	2008–09	La Liga	25	1	5	0	—				30	1
Mallorca	2009–10	La Liga	28	0	3	0	—				31	0
Mallorca	Total		53	1	6	0	—				59	1
Iraklis	2010–11	Super League Greece	26	0	2	0	—				28	0
Cartagena	2011–12	Segunda División	18	0	1	0	—				19	0
Levadiakos	2012–13	Super League Greece	25	0	5	0	—				30	0
Skoda Xanthi	2013–14	Super League Greece	16	0	2	0	—				18	0
Atlético Kolkata	2014	Indian Super League	17	0	—						17	0
Atlético Kolkata	2015	Indian Super League	3	0	—						3	0
Atlético Kolkata	Total		20	0	—						20	0
Career total			304	1	34	0	29	0	2	0	369	1

== Honours ==
Málaga

- UEFA Intertoto Cup: 2002

Liverpool

- UEFA Champions League: 2004–05
- UEFA Super Cup: 2005
- Football League Cup runner-up: 2004–05
- FIFA Club World Championship runner-up: 2005

Atlético Kolkata

- Indian Super League: 2014
