= Pulga (footballer) =

Spanish footballer

Personal information
- Full name: Víctor Herrero Forcada
- Date of birth: 6 November 1985 (age 40)
- Place of birth: Almassora, Spain
- Height: 1.79 m (5 ft 10 1/2 in)
- Position: Midfielder

Team information
- Current team: Villarreal C (assistant)

Youth career
- 2003–2005: Castellón

Senior career*
Years	Team	Apps	(Gls)
2004–2005	Castellón B		
2005–2006	Castellón	7	(1)
2006–2007	Almazora		
2007–2008	Logroñés	37	(2)
2008–2009	Villarreal B	24	(0)
2009–2010	Toledo	35	(3)
2010–2011	Alzira	32	(6)
2011–2012	Conquense	32	(5)
2012	Burriana		
2012–2013	Iraklis Psachna	14	(3)
2013–2014	Kallithea	13	(0)
2014–2015	Kerala Blasters	15	(1)
2016	Rayo Majadahonda	10	(1)
2016–2017	Mitra Kukar	10	(2)
2017	Rayo Majadahonda	3	(0)
2017	Nacional Potosí	4	(0)
2018	Kerala Blasters	1	(0)
Total		237	(25)

Managerial career
- 2019–2020: Jamshedpur (assistant)
- 2021: Benicarló
- 2022: East Bengal (assistant)
- 2024–2025: Villarreal (assistant youth)
- 2025–: Villarreal C (assistant)
- * Club domestic league appearances and goals

Víctor Herrero Forcada (born 6 November 1985), known as Pulga, is a Spanish former professional footballer who played as a central midfielder.

== Playing career ==
=== Spain ===
Born in Almassora, Province of Castellón, Valencian Community, Pulga graduated from CD Castellón's youth setup, and made his senior debut with the reserves in 2004, in the regional leagues. He played his first match as a professional on 28 August 2005, coming on as a 71st-minute substitute in a 1–0 away loss against UE Lleida in the Segunda División.

Pulga scored his only second-division goal on 11 September 2005, netting his team's in a 2–1 defeat at Xerez CD. He appeared in seven games with the main squad during the season as they narrowly avoided relegation, and signed for hometown club CD Almazora in the summer of 2007.

In July 2007, Pulga joined Logroñés CF of Segunda División B. He subsequently resumed his career mainly in the third tier, representing Villarreal CF B, CD Toledo, UD Alzira, UB Conquense and CD Burriana.

=== Greece ===
Pulga moved abroad for the first time in his career in August 2012, signing with Football League Greece club Iraklis Psachna FC. In July of the following year, he joined Kallithea F.C. in the same league.

=== Kerala Blasters ===
In August 2014, Pulga was announced in the international draft of the inaugural season of the Indian Super League. He was drafted by Kerala Blasters FC late in that month, his first appearance in top-flight football occurring on 21 October as he started in a 2–1 loss away to Chennaiyin FC. He totalled six games over the campaign, including the defeat to ATK in the final.

Pulga remained in Kochi for the league's second year, playing nine times as his side finished last. On 29 November 2015, in their penultimate match, he scored his only goal in the second minute against FC Goa at the Jawaharlal Nehru Stadium, albeit in a 5–1 defeat.

== Post-retirement ==
In February 2018, Pulga was named president of amateurs CD Almazora in his hometown. He returned to the Indian top flight on 26 July 2019, joining his compatriot Antonio Iriondo's staff at Jamshedpur FC.
