= Gennaro Bracigliano =

French footballer (born 1980)

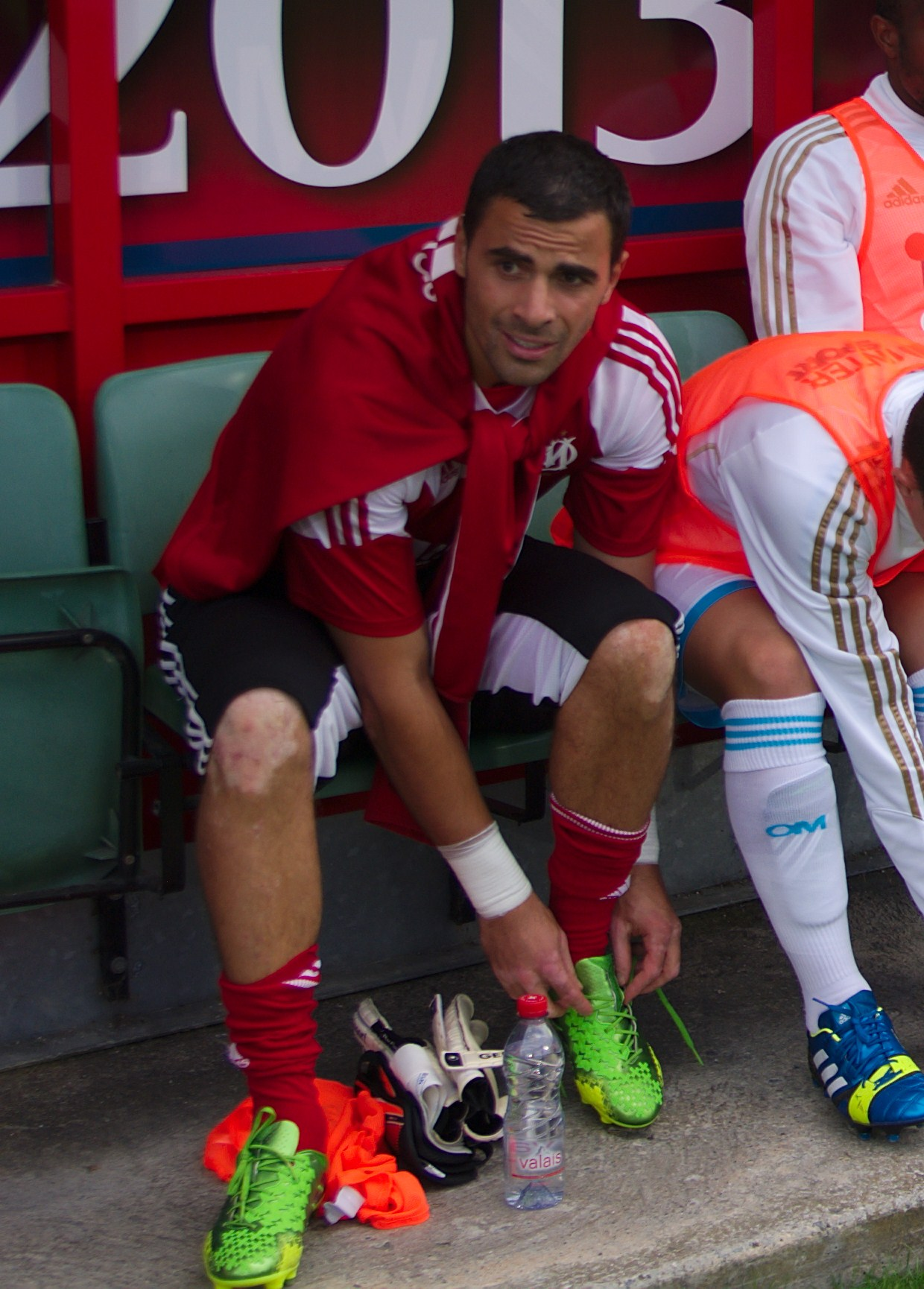
- Bracigliano with Marseille in 2013

Personal information
- Date of birth: 1 March 1980 (age 46)
- Place of birth: Forbach, France
- Height: 1.83 m (6 ft 0 in)
- Position: Goalkeeper

Team information
- Current team: Nancy (goalkeeping coach)

Youth career
- Nancy

Senior career*
Years	Team	Apps	(Gls)
1999–2011	Nancy	220	(0)
2001–2002	→ Louhans-Cuiseaux (loan)	32	(0)
2002–2003	→ Angers (loan)	35	(0)
2011–2014	Marseille	6	(0)
2014–2015	Chennaiyin	13	(0)
2015–2016	NorthEast United	2	(0)
2016–2019	Lunéville	1	(0)
Total		309	(0)

Managerial career
- 2015–2016: NorthEast United (goalkeeping coach)
- 2016–2019: Lunéville (youth)
- 2019–: Nancy (goalkeeping coach)
- * Club domestic league appearances and goals

Gennaro Bracigliano (born 1 March 1980) is a French former professional footballer who played as a goalkeeper.

== Career ==
Bracigliano was born in Forbach, Moselle. He started his career with Nancy, then he transferred to Marseille in 2011. On 13 March 2012, he came on as a substitute in his UEFA Champions League debut against Inter Milan in the stoppage time, after Steve Mandanda had been dismissed. Despite conceding a goal from a penalty by Giampaolo Pazzini, he made several crucial saves which made Marseille qualify to the quarter-finals of the 2011–12 UEFA Champions League on away goals rule, after drawing 2–2 on aggregate.

On 21 August 2014, Bracigliano was a third round pick in the Inaugural ISL International Draft, signing for Chennai. He joined the North East United FC as a goalkeeping coach and player for the second season of the Indian Super League.

== Personal life ==
His uncle Vincent Bracigliano is a former football midfielder who played for Metz and Nantes.

== Honours ==
Nancy

- Coupe de la Ligue: 2005–06

Marseille

- Trophée des Champions: 2011
- Coupe de la Ligue: 2011–12
