= Kerala Blasters FC =

Association football club in India

Kerala Blasters
- Full name: Kerala Blasters Football Club
- Nicknames: Manjappada (Yellow Army); The Tuskers
- Short name: KBFC, KER
- Founded: 27 May 2014; 12 years ago
- Ground: Jawaharlal Nehru Stadium
- Capacity: 41,000
- Owners: Al Fursan Sports Investment
- Chairman: Ahmed bin Faisal Al Qassimi
- Head coach: Ashley Westwood
- League: Indian Super League
- 2025–26: Indian Super League, 8th of 14
- Website: keralablastersfc.in
Home colours	Away colours

Kerala Blasters Football Club (Malayalam: [keːɾɐɭa(ː) bɭaːsteːɻsə̆]), commonly referred to simply as Blasters, is an Indian professional football club based in Kochi, Kerala, that competes in the Indian Super League (ISL), the top tier of football in India. The club was established in May 2014 during the inaugural season of the ISL.

The club played their inaugural match on 13 October 2014, losing 1–0 to NorthEast United. The Blasters are the three-time runners-up of the Indian Super League. They first entered the final in 2014, where they lost 1–0 to ATK after an injury-time goal from them. In 2016, they were again defeated 4–3 by ATK, this time through penalties in the final. The club entered the final for the third time in 2022, where they were defeated 3–1 by Hyderabad FC through penalties. The Blasters play home games at the Jawaharlal Nehru Stadium in Kochi. In most of the seasons since the club's founding, Kerala Blasters have held the record for the highest league attendance. The club share a rivalry with fellow South Indian neighbours Bengaluru FC and Chennaiyin FC, with whom they contest in the South Indian Derby.

The Blasters are one of the most widely supported clubs in Asia and have one of the largest social media following among football clubs from the continent. The club is also known for their fan base, including the supporters group called Manjappada, which has gained a reputational for being one of the most vocal and passionate fan clubs in Asia. The club's crest features an elephant holding a football with its trunk, denoting Kerala's deep connection with the sport. The club's traditional kit consists of a yellow and blue colour scheme, with yellow being the primary colour and identity of the club ever since the beginning.

== History ==
=== Formation ===
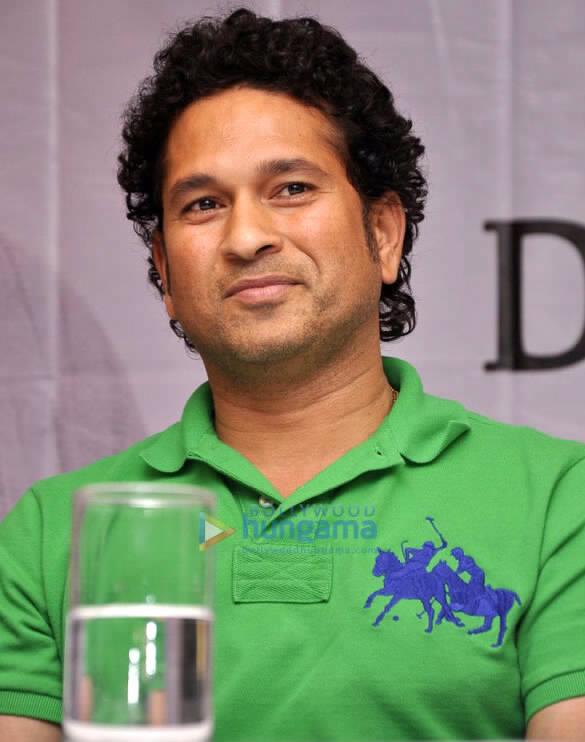
Sachin Tendulkar, one of the first co-owners of the club

In early 2014, the All India Football Federation—the governing body of association football in India, announced they would accept bids for the ownership of eight franchises from selected cities for the inaugural season of the Indian Super League (ISL). On 13 April 2014, it was announced the rights to the Kochi franchise had been won by former India national cricket team captain Sachin Tendulkar and entrepreneur Prasad V. Potluri. On 27 May 2014, the club's official name, Kerala Blasters FC (named after Sachin, as his nickname is "Master Blaster"), was announced.

Indian international Mehtab Hossain was the first player signed by the club, as he was the first one to be picked up by the Blasters during the first domestic draft. The management also selected seven other Indian players for their inaugural season. On 13 August 2014, former England international goalkeeper David James was chosen as the first head coach and marquee player of the team. On 21 August 2014, the club participated in the international draft; the management selected seven foreign players for the team. Michael Chopra, Iain Hume, Pulga, Erwin Spitzner, Pedro Gusmão, Cedric Hengbart, and Raphaël Romey were the seven foreign players drafted to Kerala Blasters. Along with them, the club directly signed Penn Orji, Jamie McAllister, Andrew Barisic, Stephen Pearson, and Colin Falvey in the remaining foreign players' slots.

=== Inaugural season ===
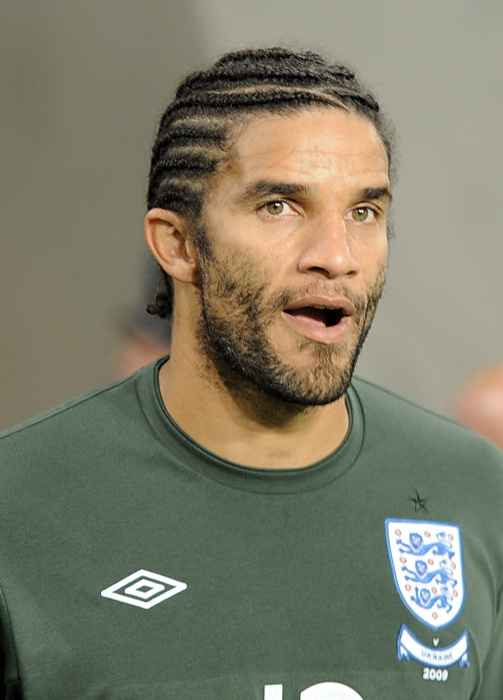
David James was the first manager and marquee player of the club

Kerala Blasters played their first game on 13 October 2014 against NorthEast United at the Indira Gandhi Athletic Stadium; they lost the game 1–0 after Koke scored in the 45th minute. On 21 October, the club's first-ever goal was scored by Iain Hume during their second match, which was against Chennaiyin. Despite Hume's goal, the Blasters lost the game 2–1. The club's first win came in their fourth game, which was played against Pune City; Chinadorai Sabeeth and Penn Orji scored the club's goals, leading to a 2–1 victory. After playing their first five matches away from home, Kerala Blasters hosted their first home match on 6 November 2014 against Goa. A goal by Milagres Gonsalves led to a 1–0 victory in front of 49,517 fans at the Jawaharlal Nehru Stadium. The Blasters qualified for the playoffs on 9 December 2014 with a 1–0 victory over Pune City.

After finishing in fourth place during the regular season, the side played their first semi-finals match on 13 December 2014 against Chennaiyin. Despite not being considered the favourite to win the two-legged tie, they won the first leg at home 3–0 with goals from Ishfaq Ahmed, Iain Hume, and Sushanth Mathew. During the second leg in Chennai, the Blasters were about to suffer a massive setback. Despite entering the second leg with a three-goal advantage, Chennaiyin drew the tie level by winning in regular time 3–0. In extra time, however, Stephen Pearson scored the decisive goal in the 117th minute to win the tie 4–3 to enter the final.

2014 Indian Super League final starting lineup

In the final, Kerala Blasters played ATK at the DY Patil Stadium in Mumbai. Hume should have given Blasters the lead after 55 minutes, but he took too long alone in front of the goalkeeper, allowing the defenders to block his shot eventually. The match was destined to go to extra time until ATK were given a corner kick in the last minuet, and headed the ball at the near post. As a result, the Blasters lost the match 1–0 despite dominating it throughout the 90 minutes.

=== 2015 season ===
After the 2014 season, the club announced David James would not return to the club as the head coach and marquee player, and on 12 May 2015, it was confirmed that former England Under-20 head coach Peter Taylor would take over the manager role at the club. The club signed a new roster of foreign players, which includes Carlos Marchena as the marquee signing.

The first match of the season was played at the Jawaharlal Nehru Stadium against NorthEast United where the Blasters won 3–1 with goals from Josu, Mohammed Rafi, and Sanchez Watt. They drew their next match against Mumbai City and then lost their next four matches, which led to the dismissal of Peter Taylor as head coach. Assistant coach Trevor Morgan was in charge for one match before Terry Phelan was named as the head coach for the rest of the season. The Blasters ended their second season in the last place of the league table.

=== 2016 season ===
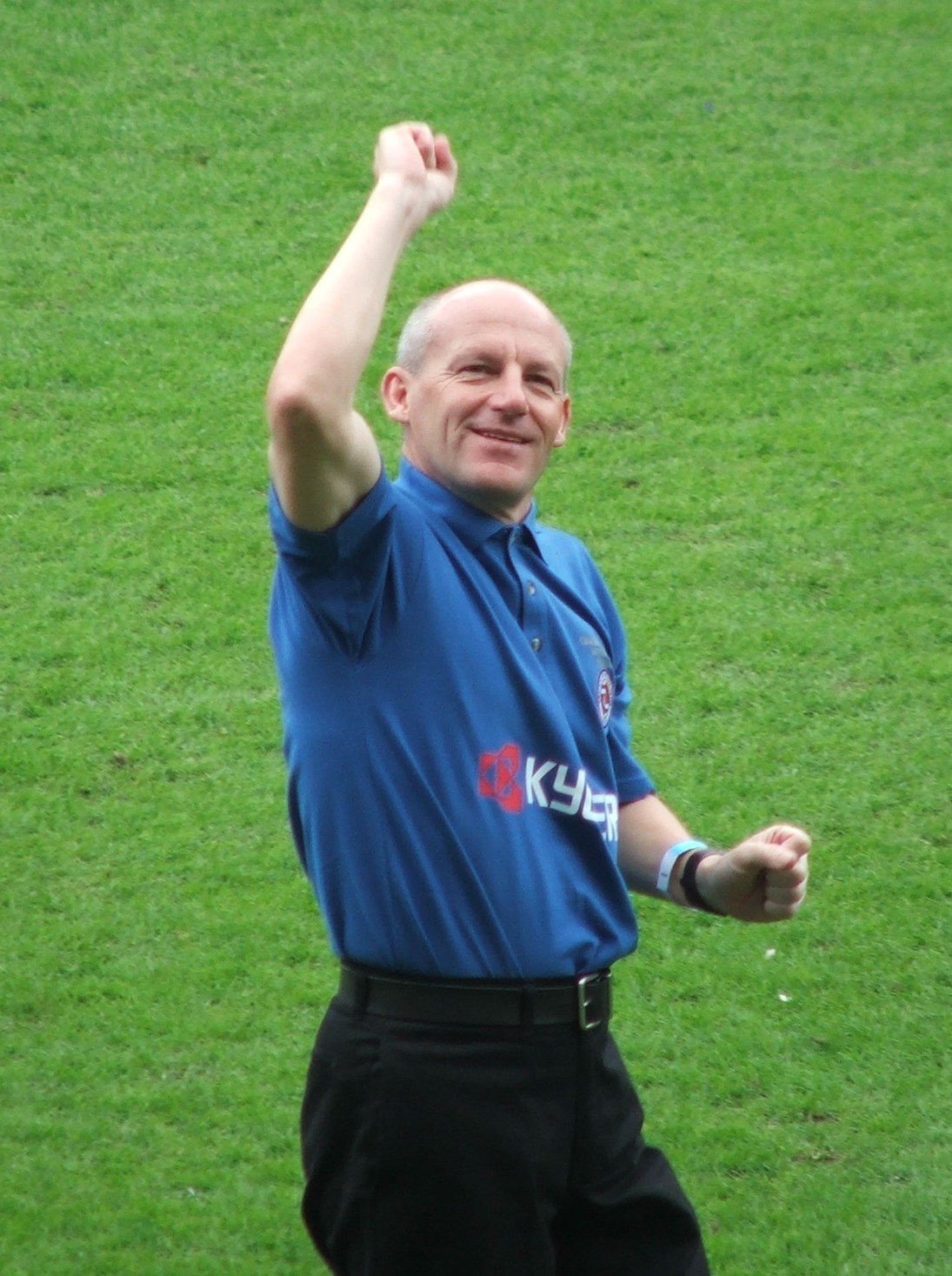
Steve Coppell led the Blasters into the 2016 ISL finals.

In an effort to rebuild the team after failing to qualify for the semi-finals in the previous season, the Blasters announced the signing of Steve Coppell as their head coach on 21 June 2016. A week later, the club announced the signing of Northern Ireland international Aaron Hughes as their marquee player for the season.

2016 Indian Super League final starting lineup

The season began with a 1–0 defeat away from home against NorthEast United. The Blasters struggled early in the season, as they failed to score goals. After the return of C.K. Vineeth from his loan-spell with Bengaluru FC, Blasters solved their goal-scoring issue. He scored four goals from his first five matches which includes a winner against FC Goa and a brace over Chennaiyin FC. In order to qualify for the semi-final, Blasters needed to avoid a defeat against NorthEast United FC. Vineeth's only goal in the 66th minute helped Blasters to beat NorthEast United 1–0 to seal the second place behind Mumbai City FC in the league table.

After finishing in second place during the regular season, the Blasters played third-placed Delhi Dynamos in the first leg of the semi-finals, which took place in Kochi. The Blasters won the match 1–0 through Kervens Belfort's 65th-minute goal. During the second leg in Delhi, the Dynamos won in extra time 2–1, which meant the scores became tied on an aggregate and the match went to penalty shootout where the Blasters won it 3–0 to enter the final. In the final, the Blasters played host to ATK and got the lead early through Mohammed Rafi before ATK equalized soon after and the match went into a penalty shootout. Despite taking the lead early in the shootout, the Blasters lost 4–3; it was their second finals defeat in three seasons.

=== 2017–18 season ===
After losing in the previous season's finals, Steve Coppell rejected a new contract extension so the club appointed former Manchester United assistant manager René Meulensteen as their new manager. Blasters released all of their foreign players and signed some more, including former Manchester United players Dimitar Berbatov and Wes Brown. Sandesh Jhingan was appointed as the captain and the club re-signed their leading goalscorer from the first season Iain Hume. The Blasters won only one of their first eight games that season, leading to the sacking of Meulensteen. Fan-favourite manager David James returned to the squad as caretaker. The Blasters won five of the remaining ten matches and finished sixth in the 2017–18 Indian Super League. They were eliminated in the first round of the Super Cup.

=== 2018–19 season ===
Having failed to qualify for the previous season's semi-finals, the Blasters signed a three-year deal with manager David James. With a new roster, Kerala Blasters had one of their worst seasons, winning only one and drawing six of their twelve fixtures, leading to the sacking of James. This season witnessed the club's rising star Sahal Abdul Samad's emergence as Blasters' mainstay in midfield. After the international mid-season break, the Blasters appointed Nelo Vingada as their new manager for the remaining six matches. Of the remaining games, the team had only one win and three draws and finished ninth in the league. They were eliminated from the Super Cup in the tournament's qualifying round.

=== 2019–20 season ===
After a disappointing season, the Blasters appointed Eelco Schattorie as their new manager. The club released all of their foreign players and signed a new roster that included Cameroon-born Raphaël Messi Bouli and former Nigeria international Bartholomew Ogbeche as forwards. Blasters beat their arch-rivals ATK on the season's first day. Throughout the season, the team was hit by injury concerns. Defender Sandesh Jhingan, who captained the club for the last two seasons, was out of action with an ACL injury, and newly signed Brazilian defender Jairo Rodrigues was also injured. Both defenders missed the entire season and Rodrigues played a few matches at the start. Gianni Zuiverloon and Mario Arqués and other players were also hit by minor injuries in the season; they missed some of the crucial fixtures. The Blasters finished the season in seventh place in the table.

=== 2020–21 season ===
From the 2020–21 season onwards, the management decided to build a new strategy at the club. As a part of this, the Blasters appointed Karolis Skinkys as their new sporting director on 15 March 2020. On 22 April 2020, the club officially announced the appointment of Kibu Vicuña as their new manager. Fan-favourite defender Sandesh Jhingan left the club on 21 May 2020 by mutual consent, ending his six-year association with the Blasters.

The Blasters decided to rely more upon young Indian players and extended the contracts of Sahal and Rahul KP until 2025. They signed Nishu Kumar on a four-year deal from Bengaluru FC. The Blasters only extended the contract of Sergio Cido among the foreign players and signed a new roster of them under the supervision of the new sporting director.

Due to the COVID-19 pandemic, the seventh season of ISL was decided to take place in 3 venues in Goa behind closed doors. Same as in the previous season, the team suffered an early setback, with this time, captain Sergio Cidoncha suffering a ligament injury on his right ankle during their third match against Chennaiyin FC, ruling out for the remainder of the season. It took the Blasters seven games to register their first victory of the season, winning against Hyderabad FC 2–0. The team was affected by injuries, lesser compared to the previous season. They lost 18 points from the winning position, which includes 4 losses after taking the early lead. The club had the worst defensive performance in their history conceding 33 goals in 18 games and having only 3 wins. On 17 February 2021, after a 4–0 loss against Hyderabad FC on 16 February, Kibu Vicuna and the management decided to part ways on mutual consent. Assistant manager Ishfaq Ahmed was appointed as the interim head coach for the remaining 2 games of the season. The club's fortunes remained largely unchanged in the season as they finished tenth place in the league table.

=== 2021–22 season ===
After another disappointing season, the club appointed Ivan Vukomanović as their head coach on 17 June 2021. The Blasters started their pre-season camp in July 2021, and played the most friendlies across all ISL clubs prior to the season. In August, the club confirmed its participation in the 2021 Durand Cup, thus competing in the tournament for the first time in its history. After three league stage matches, they were knocked out of the tournament, following their defeat over Delhi FC on 22 September. On 19 November, the Blasters played their first match of the 2021–22 Indian Super League against ATK Mohun Bagan, in which they lost 4–2. The club won their first season match by defeating Odisha on 5 December by 2–1. This victory was Kerala Blasters' first ISL victory in 11 months. After their defeat in the season's opening match, the Blasters remained unbeaten for the next 10 games, until they were beaten by the southern rivals Bengaluru on 30 January. In between the unbeaten run, the Blasters moved to the top spot in the league table for the first time in 7 years during the middle of the season. After Mumbai City's defeat against Hyderabad on 6 March, the Blasters qualified for the playoffs for the first time since the 2016 season. When the regular phase of the season ended, Vukomanović's Blasters side broke many club records in terms of the number of wins, the total number of goals and clean sheets, points-per-game, and achieved a positive goal difference for the first time in the club's history.

2022 Indian Super League final starting lineup

With the Blasters winning 2–1 on aggregate against Jamshedpur from both the semi-finals, they qualified for the finals of the ISL for the third time in their history. They faced Hyderabad in the final on 20 March, which they lost in the penalty shoot-out. It was the club's third defeat in an Indian Super League final.

=== 2022–23 season ===
After an impressive season, in April 2022, Kerala Blasters renewed the contract of the head coach Ivan Vukomanović till 2025. It was the first time that the club has renewed the contract of a first-team head coach in its history. Even though the Blasters' pre-season preparations in the UAE were interrupted by the FIFA ban on AIFF, the club sent their reserve team for the 2022 Durand Cup, in which they reached the quarter-finals but were knocked out by Mohammedan SC from the tournament. The club only retained Marko Lešković and Adrián Luna as their foreigner players from the previous season, as the rest of the foreigners left the club.

They played the opening match of the season on 7 October against East Bengal FC, which they won 3–1. Even though the Blasters lost their next three games, they recovered from the bad run and went on an eight match unbeaten streak and five consecutive wins for the first time in their history in this season. By the end of the season, the Blasters won ten of their twenty league stage matches, which became a club record, and ended up 5th in the table and qualified for the playoffs. The Blasters met arch-rivals Bengaluru FC in the first knockout stage match in a new format for the ISL playoffs. The match that took place on 3 March is known for the controversial Sunil Chhetri's goal and walk-off by the Kerala Blasters players. Ivan Vukomanović called-off the Blasters players from the pitch into the dressing room after the referee gave green light to the Sunil Chhetri's free-kick goal for Bengaluru in the extra-time, which the Blasters players and staff deemed illegitimate citing that the Blasters players did not set themselves in their defensive positions prior to the free-kick was taken. Bengaluru was awarded the win, and the Blasters appealed to the federation for the match to be replayed and demanded for the match referee Crystal John to banned from refereeing. The AIFF disciplinary committee rejected the Blasters' appeal and imposed a fine of rupees four crores on the Blasters for abandoning the match and asked them to issue a public apology within a week, failing which they would be obliged to pay a fine of rupees six crores, and Vukomanović was handed a ten-match ban by the AIFF-DC from taking part in any AIFF held tournaments along with a fine of rupees five lakhs, and directed him to issue a public apology within a week as well, failing which the fine would be doubled to rupees ten lakhs. The club and Vukomanović then issued their apologies and 'regrets' as demanded by the AIFF-DC, giving a dramatic end to their ISL campaign.

Kerala Blasters also took part in the 2023 Indian Super Cup, which took place in Kozhikode after the end of the ISL season in April 2023. They won their first group stage match of the tournament against RoundGlass Punjab FC on 8 April by 3–1. Even though they won the first match, they lost their next match against Sreenidi Deccan FC by 2–0. They played Bengaluru FC in a must-win match from Group A on 16 April, but the match ended in a 1–1 draw, and the Blasters were eliminated from the tournament, as they ended yet another season without a silverware.

=== 2023–24 season ===
After a dramatic end to the 2022–23 season, the club parted ways with their assistant coach Ishfaq Ahmed after his four years stint at the club. Ahead of the season, the Blasters' captain Jessel Carneiro also left the club and signed for the rivals Bengaluru FC. This season also witnessed the departure of their Indian midfielder and then-most-capped player at the time, Sahal Abdul Samad, who left the club following a swap deal with Mohun Bagan Super Giant for Pritam Kotal, and for a transfer fee of ₹90 lakhs. The club also made their most expensive signing its history by paying FC Goa a reported fee of ₹1.45 crores for the transfer of Aibanbha Dohling on a three-year contract. The Blasters retained Dimitrios Diamantakos, who was their leading goal-scorer from the previous season, as he signed a one-year contract extension, and was one among the three foreign players alongside Adrián Luna and Marko Lešković to be retained for this season. The Blasters started the 2023–24 season with 2023 Durand Cup after being drawn alongside Bengaluru in Group C. They started their campaign on 13 August 2023 with a 3–4 defeat against Gokulam Kerala FC. With their 5–0 win over the Indian Navy FT in their last match of the Durand Cup, the Blasters registered the highest win in their history, but was eliminated from the competition after finishing third in the group with just four points.

After making new foreign reinforcements with the likes of Miloš Drinčić, Kwame Peprah, and Daisuke Sakai, the Blasters came in to the new season of the Indian Super League, as they played in the opening match of the season against Bengaluru FC on 21 September, which they would win 2–1 at full-time. After the end of the ten-match ban imposed on Ivan Vukomanović by the AIFF-DC due to the walk-out incident from the previous season's playoffs, the Blasters gaffer made his return to the dug-out on 27 October Odisha FC in a 2–1 comeback win. During this match, the Blasters captain Adrián Luna became the joint all-time top-scorer of the club alongside Bartholomew Ogbeche after scoring the winner of the match for the Blasters. After his brace against Chennaiyin FC in November, the Blasters's striker Diamantakos became the all-time top scorer at the club with 16 goals across all competitions, surpassing the joint-record set by Ogbeche and Luna. During this season, the Blasters registered their first ever win against Mohun Bagan Super Giant in their last match of 2023.

Following the winter-breaks, the Blasters took part in the 2024 Indian Super Cup in the month of January. They began their campaign on 10 January in a 3–1 over Shillong Lajong FC. However, the Blasters were disqualified from the tournament following the two defeats in the rest of the group stage matches.

The second phase of the league began following the conclusion of the Super Cup, as an injury stricken Blasters made their return on 2 February in a 2–1 defeat against Odisha. Following their win against Mohun Bagan in December 2023, the Blasters would win only two out of their rest of the ten league matches (against FC Goa and Hyderabad FC respectively), as they ended the regular season with 33 points at 5th spot in the table, but qualified for the league playoffs for the third consecutive time for the first time in club's history. The Blasters met Odisha away from home in the knockout play-offs on 19 April 2024. After a goalless first-half, the Blasters took the lead through a second-half goal by Fedor Černych, but a late minute equalizer by Odisha took the game to extra-time, and the home side would score their winner in the extra-time to knock the Blasters out of the tournament as they lost the match by the score of 2–1 at 120 minutes. By the end of the season, the Blasters had over a dozen injuries in their squad throughout the season coupled with a dozen suspensions, as the Blasters ended their 2023–24 season without a silverware.

After topping the goal-scoring charts in the league with 13 goals in 17 games, the Blasters' striker Dimitrios Diamantakos won the league's Golden Boot award.

=== 2024–25 season ===
After three successive seasons under Ivan Vukomanović, Kerala Blasters entered the 2024–25 season with significant changes both on and off the pitch. On 26 April 2024, the club and Vukomanović mutually agreed to part ways, bringing an end to one of the most successful managerial spells in the club's history. A month later, on 23 May, Swedish coach Mikael Stahre was appointed as the new head coach on a two-year deal. Many players left the Blasters' including the club's all-time leading goalscorer Dimitrios Diamantakos and fan favorite Jeakson Singh, who left the club after spending six seasons. Amid all these departures, club captain Adrián Luna committed his future by signing a contract extension until 2027.

Following their Thailand tour during the pre-season, the Blasters began their 2024–25 campaign with an 8–0 win over Mumbai City FC in the 2024 Durand Cup in their first competitive match of the season. This victory broke the club record for the biggest win in the Blasters' history and tied the record for the biggest win in the tournament's history, matching the score of the 1889 Durand Cup final. The team progressed to the knockout stage after finishing at the top of their group but saw their campaign come to an end in the quarter-finals following a narrow defeat to Bengaluru FC.

The Blasters started their Indian Super League season with a defeat against Punjab FC. Inconsistent results gradually derailed their campaign, as the team managed only one victory in seven league matches during the middle phase of the season. The poor run ultimately led to the departure of Mikael Stahre on 16 December 2024, less than seven months after his appointment. Assistant coaches T. G. Purushothaman and Tomasz Tchórz were entrusted with the responsibility of managing the team on an interim basis for the remainder of the season. The Blasters concluded the league stage with eight wins, five draws and eleven defeats from twenty-four matches, finishing eighth in the standings with 29 points and missed out on qualification for the playoffs for the first time since the 2020–21 season.

=== 2025–26 season ===
Following the conclusion of the 2024–25 season, Kerala Blasters appointed Spanish coach David Català as their new head coach on 22 March 2025, signing him on a one-year contract ahead of the 2025 Super Cup. Preparations for the new season, however, coincided with uncertainty surrounding the future of the Indian Super League after the expiry of the Master Rights Agreement between the All India Football Federation and Football Sports Development Limited in December 2025.

With the commencement of the league remaining uncertain, Kerala Blasters began their competitive season in the 2025 Super Cup in October. The Blasters began their competitive season in the 2025 Super Cup on 30 October 2025 with a 1–0 victory over Rajasthan United. After defeating Sporting Club Delhi 3–0 in the next match, they only needed draw in their final group-stage fixture against Mumbai City to qualify for the semi-finals. But the Blasters conceded an 88th-minute own goal in the match and lost 1–0, finishing second in the group and was eliminated from the tournament.

Amid uncertainty around the Indian Super League, the club temporarily suspended its operations in November 2025 following their exit from the Super Cup. With further delay in confirming the league calendar, the club continued to face financial constraints. Due to the prolonged uncertainty, many core players left the club during the January 2026 transfer window. Captain Adrián Luna joined Indonesian side Persik Kediri on loan until the end of the season, while Noah Sadaoui was also loaned to Dewa United. The club also parted ways with several first-team Indian players, including fan favourites Mohammed Aimen and Mohammed Azhar.

The Indian Super League eventually commenced in February 2026 after several months of delay. This was the first season without the ISL playoffs with each team playing only 13 matches with the table toppers at the end of the league being crowned champions. The AIFF also implemented relegation from this season despite objections from all 14 clubs, who cited the shortened season as their primary concern. The Blasters endured a poor start to the campaign, collecting only one point from their opening six matches. Following the poor results, the club parted ways with David Català in March 2026 and appointed Ashley Westwood as his successor. Westwood oversaw a marked improvement in the club's performances during the remainder of the campaign. Under him, the Blasters defeated rivals Bengaluru FC 2–1 at the Sree Kanteerava Stadium, registering the club's first ever away game win against them. The Blasters also made a four-match winning run before ending the season unbeaten in their final six matches of the league and finished eighth at the table.

== Crest, colours and kits ==
The crest and colours for Kerala Blasters were announced at the club's official launch on 15 September 2014.

=== Crest ===
The club's crest is designed around the elephant, one of Kerala's main symbols, to reflect its place in Kerala's culture and festivities, and to represent the state's sporting legacy. The elephant holds a football with its trunk, denoting the state's deep connection with the sport. The elephant is a symbol of unity, power, and pride; it also symbolises the heritage, culture, spirit, and passion of Kerala, and its love for football.

=== Colours ===
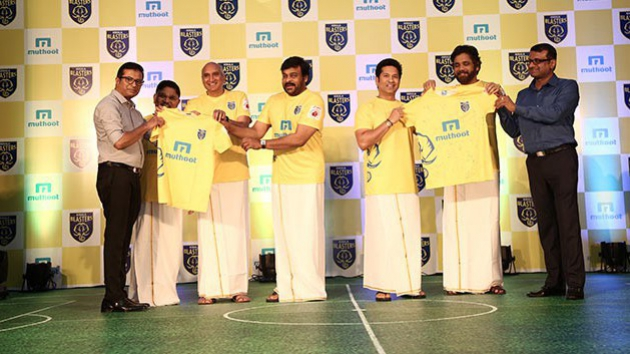
The club's home shirts during the 2016 season

Since its inception, the club colours have been yellow and blue. Yellow is the club's primary colour as well as its main identity. According to former co-owner Sachin Tendulkar, yellow stands for determination and faith. During their inaugural season, the club wore yellow shirts and blue shorts and this was used until the 2016 season. For the 2017–18 season, the Blasters introduced an all-yellow kit with a different shade of yellow. Here the blue remained as the secondary colour that flows across the side of the shirt. This kit was used for the 2018–19 season, after which the team returned to its traditional yellow and blue kit with the same shades as the previous season. In 2020, a New Jersey in the club's customary yellow and blue colours was launched, with this time, the blue coming in the arms. The kit which pays homage to the state of Kerala also had horizontal lines that run along the breadth of the jersey. In 2021, they introduced a jersey in the familiar yellow and blue colors, inspired by the Kerala football team's victory in the 1973 Santosh Trophy. In 2022 and 2023, new jerseys were launched, all adhering to the club's traditional yellow and blue color scheme but featuring distinct patterns.

The club's away colours for the first three seasons were yellow shirts and white shorts. For the 2017–18 season, the club introduced the all-black jersey with yellow stripe on the bottom of arms and shorts and this was used until the 2019–20 season. In 2020, the Blasters launched a new blue away kit with a distinctive pattern. This kit was launched by the club as a dedication to their fans, who were missed at the stands due to COVID-19 pandemic. In 2021, they brought back their black away kit with blue stripes as a homage to their passionate fans. In 2022, the black away kit was retained but featured blue and purple stripes. In 2023, the club introduced a fresh blue and purple away kit.

In 2020, the Blasters launched a contest for the fans to design the club's first-ever third kit for the 2020–21 season. The third kit which had a white and gold colour scheme, designed by one of the fans was released by the club as an honour to the sacrifices and contribution of the frontline workers, who have been relentlessly working to win the fight against the COVID-19 pandemic.

=== Kit manufacturers and shirt sponsors ===
Period	Kit manufacturer	Shirt sponsor	Back sponsor
2014–15	Puma	Muthoot Group	Bajaj Allianz
2015–16	Puma	Muthoot Group	Oxigen
2016–17	Spartan	Muthoot Group	
2017–18	Admiral	Muthoot Group	Unitac
2018–19	SIX5SIX	Muthoot Group	
2019–20	Reyaur	Muthoot Group	Jain University
2020–21	Reyaur	BYJU'S	Haeal
2021–22	SIX5SIX	BYJU'S	PhonePe
2022–24	SIX5SIX	BYJU'S	1XBat
2024–25	Reyaur	Medhaa	Batery
2025–26	SIX5SIX	White Gold	KEI
2026–27	SIX5SIX		

== Grounds ==
=== Stadium ===
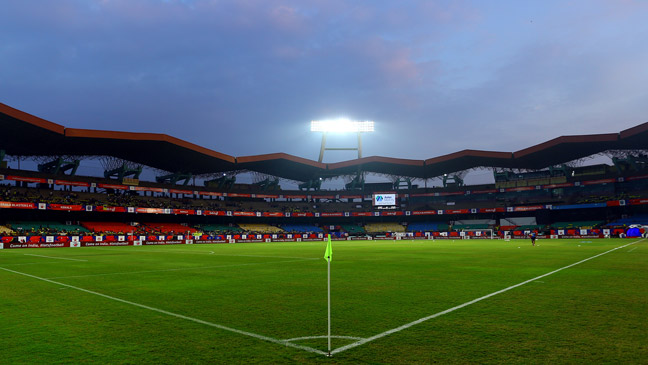
The Jawaharlal Nehru Stadium in Kochi

Kerala Blasters play their home matches at the Jawaharlal Nehru Stadium in the city of Kochi. The stadium is multipurpose but is mostly used for football. It has hosted games of both the Indian national football and cricket teams, and has hosted National Football League and I-League clubs FC Kochin and Chirag United Club Kerala. The stadium was also a venue for the Indian Premier League side Kochi Tuskers Kerala and was selected as a venue for the 2017 FIFA U-17 World Cup. As a part of the FIFA event, the stadium was renovated and new seats were fitted and its capacity was reduced to 50,000 and later to 41,000, taking into account security issues. The stadium received the Best Pitch of the Season Award of the League in the 2018–19 season of Indian Super League. In 2019, Greater Cochin Development Authority proposed the installation of solar panels in the stadium, which would make it the first such venue in Kerala and the third in the country to be powered by solar energy.

=== Training Ground ===
Kerala Blasters uses The Sanctuary as their official training facility. Located within Sree Narayana Vidyapeetam Public School inThrippunithura, Kochi, it was built in partnership with the school. The club have a long term lease agreement for the complete control of the facility. The senior team, academy, and the reserves share the same facility. It also includes dedicated spaces for recovery, medical care, performance analysis, meetings and media operations along with dressing rooms for the players and coaches.

== Support ==
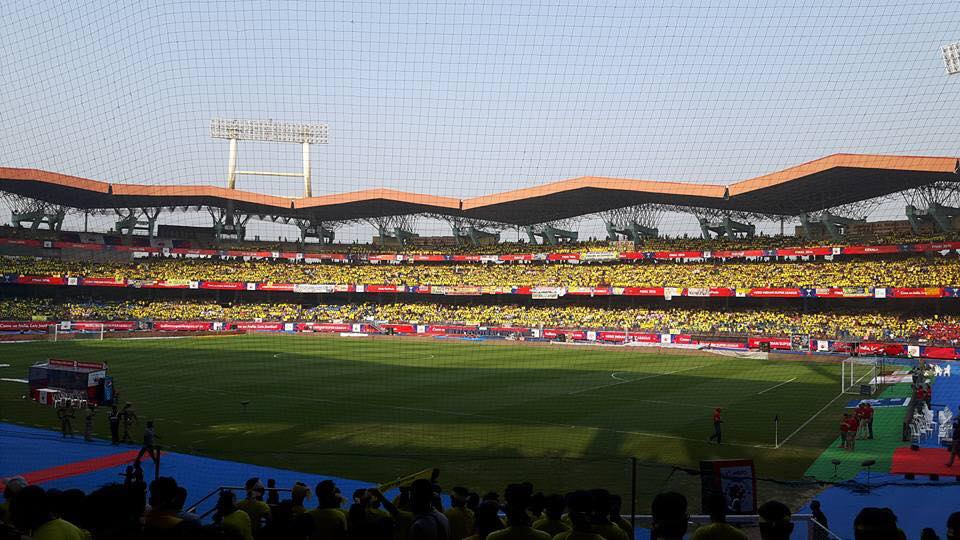
Fans at the Jawaharlal Nehru Stadium during an Indian Super League match

Kerala Blasters are known in the ISL for their fanatical supporters. During the early years, averaging over 55,000 fans a game, the Blasters had the highest average attendance in most of the seasons they have played. It fell to 37,500 in 2017 because safety regulations reduced the stadium's capacity to 41,000 as a part of 2017 FIFA U-17 World Cup where Kochi was a venue. According to former India international player Pappachen Pradeep, "In Kerala, the people support football tirelessly. It doesn't matter if the team wins or loses, they are always there in high numbers. I've played at places like Kolkata, where if the team loses two-three matches on the spin, the numbers in the stadium diminish. There is nothing like that in Kerala." However Kerala Blasters have seen reduction in the average attendance below 30,000 on two seasons. During 2018–19 season, the Blasters had an average attendance of 16,432 and it became 17,500 in 2019–20 season.

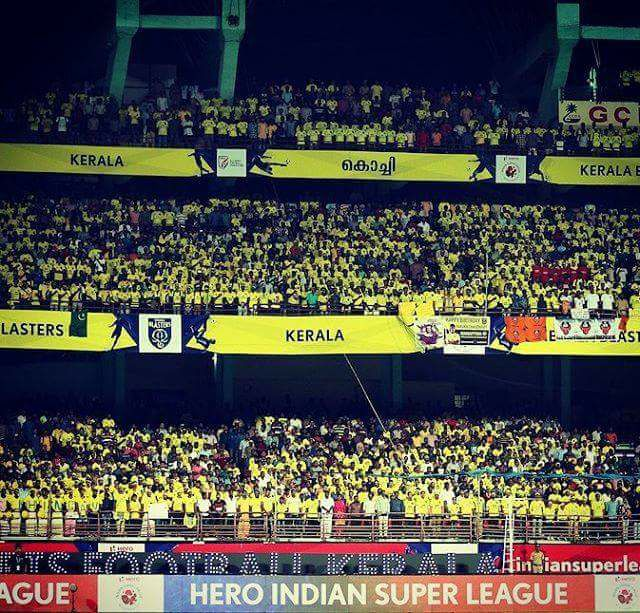
Supporters of Kerala Blasters during an ISL match at the Jawaharlal Nehru Stadium in 2016

According to Fox Asia, as of January 2023, the Blasters are the sixth most-popular Asian club on social media, becoming so in 2018 within the four years of its existence and were the youngest club among the list. They are also the most followed Indian club on social media. In February 2021, Kerala Blasters became the first Indian club to attain two million followers on Instagram. According to a research in 2021, the club has the joint-fastest growing social media account on Instagram in Asia and sixth across the world in terms of fans interaction among all the football clubs.

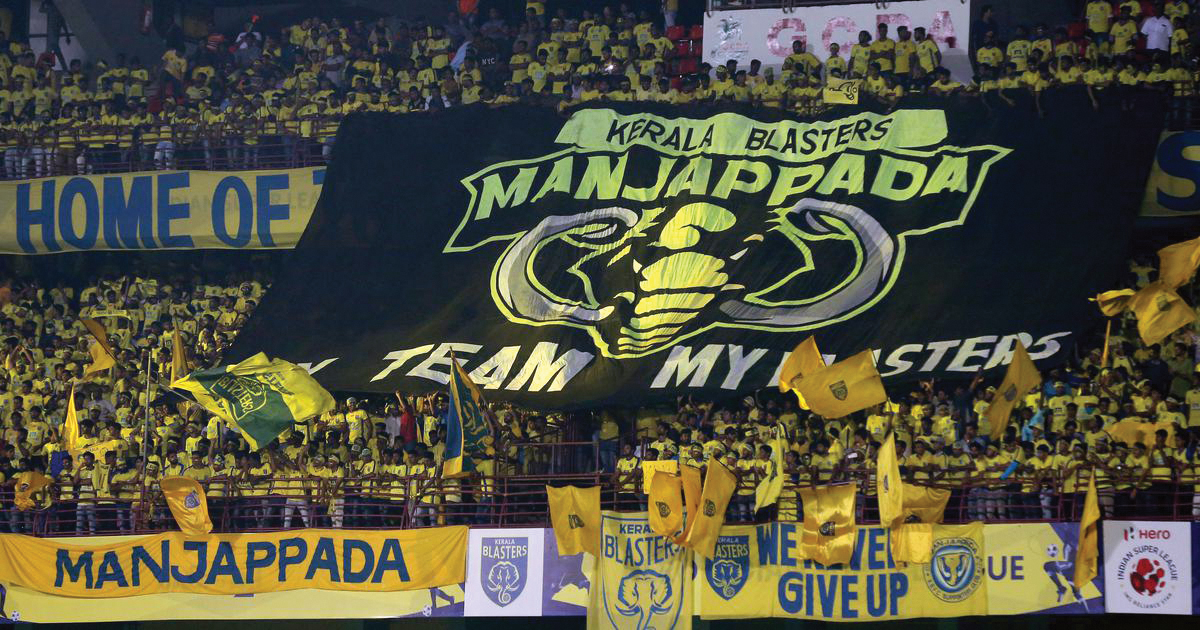
Manjappada (Yellow army) of Kerala Blasters

The Blasters are also known for having one of the most vocal and passionate supporters groups, known as Manjappada. Founded in 2014, they are one of the largest and most active supporters groups in the country. The group has also won the award for the 'Best Fan Club' at the Indian Sports Honours for two times in 2017 and 2020.

== Rivalries ==
=== South Indian Derby ===
The club's main rivals are their South Indian neighbours, Chennaiyin FC and Bengaluru FC.

==== Chennaiyin FC ====
Kerala Blasters have developed a rivalry with fellow southern club Chennaiyin FC from the inaugural season of the Indian Super League itself. Former Chennaiyin head coach and player Marco Materazzi was sent off when the clubs played each other in the 2014 semi-final and was then given a one-match suspension in 2016 after he was involved in a scuffle between a Chennaiyin player and a Kerala Blasters player. This incident led Kerala Blasters fans to wear masks of Zinedine Zidane at the return leg in Kochi, intensifying the rivalry between the clubs. The meetings between the two clubs later came to be known as the South Indian Derby. Bengaluru FC became a part of the South Indian Derby, when they joined Indian Super League in 2017.

==== Bengaluru FC ====
The Blasters have also developed a rivalry with Karnataka-based club Bengaluru FC, which started in 2017 before Bengaluru began playing in the ISL. The rivalry stems from the competition between both clubs fan bases; Manjappada of the Blasters and Bengaluru's West Block Blues. The South Indian Derby between the Blasters and Bengaluru is often known as the Real South Indian Derby.

=== Rivalry with Mohun Bagan SG ===
The Blasters shares an intense rivalry with the Kolkata based club Mohun Bagan Super Giant. Even before the inception of Indian Super League, the states of Kerala and West Bengal had a long lasting rivalry in the Santosh Trophy. The club's rivalry with ATK started at the 2014 final, which ATK won in extra time. Both clubs once again met at the final in 2016, which the Blasters lost on penalties. In 2020, ATK merged with the football section of multi-sport club Mohun Bagan to form ATK Mohun Bagan. In 2023, Kolkata club's name was changed to Mohun Bagan Super Giant. Mohun Bagan since has dominated the rivalry as they only lost once in last 5 seasons they met. Kerala are yet to win against them in their own home ground.

== Ownership and finances ==
In April 2014, it was announced that the former India cricket captain Sachin Tendulkar, along with PVP Ventures, won the bidding for the Kochi franchise in Indian Super League. A consortium named Blasters Sports Ventures Private Limited (BSVPL) was established to oversee the administration and operations of the club. Tendulkar said that he took a stake in the club because he wanted to help popularise football in India and to see Kerala return to its former glory as a footballing state. In May 2014, he said; "People used to call me Master Blaster. I'm supporting Kerala, Kochi team. I hope the entire Kerala will be behind our football team. That's why we thought of naming it as Kerala Blasters FC." PVP group owned 60 percent of the club. In October 2015, Securities and Exchange Board of India, imposed a fine of ₹30 crore on PVP Group for not complying with disclosure terms, pushing the club into financial uncertainty. To overcome the financial crisis, Tendulkar partnered with the club's main sponsor Muthoot Group, bought 40 percent from PVP Group's stake and acquired the majority stake at the club.

In June 2016, it was confirmed that a consortium led by industrialist Nimmagadda Prasad, Telugu film actors Chiranjeevi, Nagarjuna and film producer Allu Aravind have purchased 80 percent stake at the club. The 20 percent stake of the club remained with Tendulkar. In September 2018, Tendulkar sold his remaining stake at the club to its majority shareholders for personal reasons, stating; "A piece of my heart will always beat for Kerala Blasters". In January 2021, the consortium was renamed as Magnum Sports Private Limited. Nikhil Bhardwaj, son of the majority shareholder Nimmagadda Prasad served as the director of the club. Magnum Sports Private Limited also owned the Pro Kabaddi League team Tamil Thalaivas and in 2020, entered in a partnership with Serbian volleyball club Radnicki Belgrade to form Radnicki Blasters, which plays in the Serbian First Division tournaments.

In early 2026, rumours emerged that Magnum Sports Private Limited was considering the sale of the club amid financial constraints and protests from its supporters. In August 2026, it was widely reported that a UAE-based consortium was finalising an offer to acquire Kerala Blasters FC. After months of speculation, the ownership change was announced on 29 September 2026, after Magnum Sports Private Limited agreed to sell 100% stake of the club to the UAE-based consortium named Al Fursan Sports Investment. The consortium is led by Sheikh Ahmed bin Faisal Al Qassimi, a member of the UAE's Al Qassimi royal family. The deal was reported to be worth about ₹120 crore and the takeover would be completed in a staggered manner over the course of the 2026–27 season. Al Fursan appointed Ofioh Sporty India Private Limited, a Kerala-based sports management firm as its operational partner to oversee the club's day-to-day management and operational execution.

=== Sponsorship ===
On 29 September 2014, it was announced Kerala-based Muthoot Pappachan Group would be the title sponsor for Kerala Blasters. Under the agreement, Muthoot sponsored the Blasters for one season with the option to extend the sponsorship. On 24 October that year, a month later, the Blasters announced the German sports manufacturer Puma would be the kit sponsors for the 2014 season. Both sponsorships continued in 2015 and Muthoot remained as title sponsor for the club until 2020. In 2020, a 5 year deal was signed with Byju's to become the club's title sponsor. The agreement with Byju's was cancelled in 2024 due to the financial constraints faced by the company. The club's 2024–25 title sponsor was Medhaa. The deal with Medhaa lasted only one season, and the Blasters signed a deal with White Gold in 2025 to become the team's title sponsor for the 2025–26 season.

== Management ==
Position	Name
Chairman	(United Arab Emirates) Ahmed bin Faisal Al Qassimi
Chief executive officer	(India) Abhik Chatterjee
Head of Football development	(India) Thangboi Singto
Chief operating officer	(India) Shushen Vashisth
Chief financial officer	(India) Mohit Thadi
Head of Administrative operations	(India) Thameem Anvar Sadiq
Marketing officer	(India) Antony Manu
Revenue officer	(India) Joby Joseph
Director of academy	Vacant

Last updated: 29 September 2026

== Technical staff ==
As of 29 September 2026

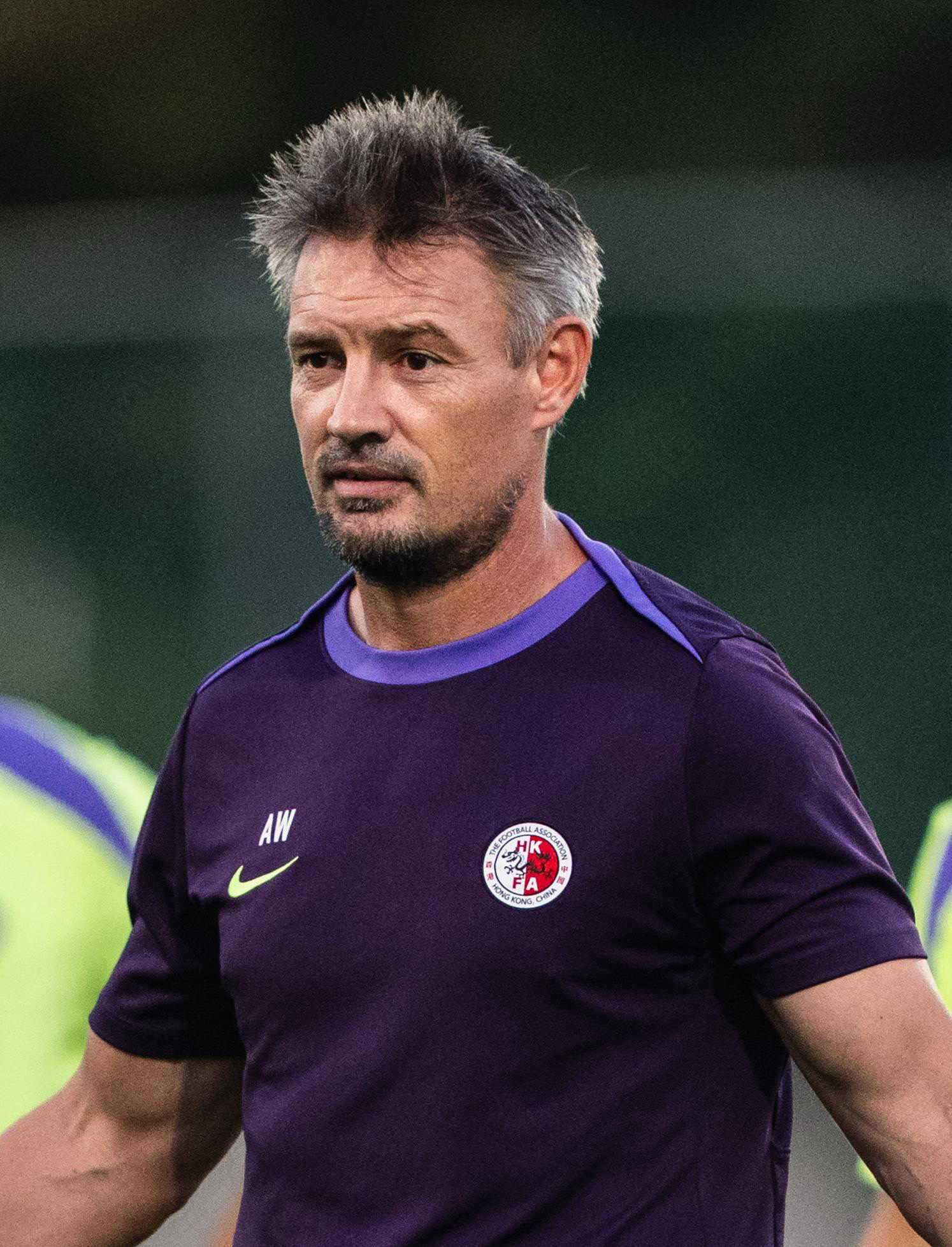
Ashley Westwood, the current head coach of Kerala Blasters.

Role	Name
Head coach	(England) Ashley Westwood
Assistant coach	(England) Hasney Aljofree
Assistant coach	(India) Amit Rana
Strength and conditioning coach	(England) Alfy Perry
Goalkeeping coach	(India) Felix D'Souza
Reserves head coach	(India) Aiswaryan Ajay
U-18 head coach	Vacant
U-15 head coach	Vacant
U-13 head coach	(India) Rohan Shah
Scouting head	(India) Nasim Akhtar

== Players ==
=== First-team squad ===
As of 09 October 2026

Note: Flags indicate national team as defined under FIFA eligibility rules; some limited exceptions apply. Players may hold more than one non-FIFA nationality.

No.	Pos.	Nation	Player
1	GK	IND	Amrinder Singh
3	DF	IND	Sandeep Singh
4	DF	IND	Hormipam Ruivah
5	DF	IND	Sumit Sharma
6	MF	IND	Freddy Lallawmawma (5th captain)
7	FW	IND	Korou Singh
8	MF	IND	Vibin Mohanan (4th captain)
9	FW	ENG	Andre Green
10	MF	URU	Adrián Luna (captain)
11	MF	IND	Mohammed Sanan
13	DF	ENG	James Bolton
15	MF	IND	Sahil Tavora
16	MF	IND	Paul Ramfangzauva
19	DF	IND	Jaganath Jayan
23	MF	MNE	Nebojša Kosović

No.	Pos.	Nation	Player
24	MF	IND	Joel Lalramengmawia
27	DF	IND	Aibanbha Dohling (3rd captain)
31	GK	IND	Arsh Anwer Shaikh
32	MF	IND	Mohammad Yasir
33	DF	IND	Bikash Yumnam (vice-captain)
44	DF	SEN	Fallou Ndiaye
45	FW	IND	Sreekuttan MS
46	FW	IND	Ramhlunchhunga
47	MF	IND	Ebindas Yesudasan
50	DF	IND	Naocha Singh
55	DF	IND	Amey Ranawade
81	GK	IND	Alsabith ST
99	FW	GUI	Momo Yansané

=== Other players under contract ===
Note: Flags indicate national team as defined under FIFA eligibility rules; some limited exceptions apply. Players may hold more than one non-FIFA nationality.

No.	Pos.	Nation	Player
—	DF	IND	Rakesh Meitei

== Records and statistics ==
=== Season by season ===
Correct as the end of the 2025–26 season.

Season	League								Playoffs	Super Cup	Other competitions	Top scorer(s)	
Season	Pld	W	D	L	GF	GA	Pts	Pos	Playoffs	Super Cup	Durand Cup	Player(s)	Goals
2014	14	5	4	5	9	11	19	4th	RU	DNE	DNP	(Canada) Iain Hume	5
2015	14	3	4	7	22	27	13	8th	DNQ	DNE	SUSP	(Grenada) Antonio German (England) Chris Dagnall	6
2016	14	6	4	4	12	14	22	2nd	RU	DNE	DNP	(India) C.K. Vineeth	5 🇮🇳
2017–18	18	6	7	5	20	22	25	6th	DNQ	R16	SUSP	(Canada) Iain Hume	5
2018–19	18	2	9	7	18	28	15	9th	DNQ	QL	SUSP	(Serbia) Slaviša Stojanović (Slovenia) Matej Poplatnik	4
2019–20	18	4	7	7	29	32	19	7th	DNQ	SUSP	SUSP	(Nigeria) Bartholomew Ogbeche	15 ⭐
2020–21	20	3	8	9	23	36	17	10th	DNQ	SUSP	DNP	(Australia) Jordan Murray	7
2021–22	20	9	7	4	34	24	34	4th	RU	SUSP	GS	(Argentina) Jorge Pereyra Díaz (Spain) Álvaro Vázquez	8
2022–23	20	10	1	9	28	28	31	5th	KO	GS	QF	(Greece) Dimitrios Diamantakos	12
2023–24	22	10	3	9	32	31	33	5th	KO	GS	GS	(Greece) Dimitrios Diamantakos	16⭐
2024–25	24	8	5	11	33	37	29	8th	DNQ	QF	QF	(Morocco) Noah Sadaoui	14
2025–26	13	5	2	6	15	17	17	8th	SUSP	GS	DNP	(Spain) Víctor Bertomeu	4

=== Key ===
- Pld – Matches played
- W – Matches won
- D – Matches drawn
- D – Matches lost
- GF – Goals for
- GA – Goals against
- Pts – Points
- Pts – Position
- SUSP – Competition suspended
- DNQ – Did not qualify
- DNE – Did not exist
- DNP – Did not participate
- QL – Qualifier
- R16 – Round of 16
- QF – Quarter-finals
- SF – Semi-finals
- RU – Runners-up

=== Managerial history ===
Name	Nationality	Period	Note
David James	England	2014	Player-manager
Peter Taylor	England	2015	
Trevor Morgan	England	2015	Caretaker
Terry Phelan	Ireland	2015–2016	
Steve Coppell	England	2016–2017	
René Meulensteen	Netherlands	2017	
David James	England	2017–2018	
Nelo Vingada	Portugal	2019	Interim
Eelco Schattorie	Netherlands	2019–2020	
Kibu Vicuña	Spain	2020–2021	
Ishfaq Ahmed	India	2021	Interim
Ivan Vukomanović	Serbia	2021–2024	
Mikael Stahre	Sweden	2024	
T. G. Purushothaman	India	2024	Caretaker
David Català	Spain	2025–2026	
Ashley Westwood	England	2026–	

=== Player records ===
Most appearances
Rank	Player	Apps.
1	(India) Sahal Abdul Samad	97
2	(Uruguay) Adrián Luna	90
2	(India) Hormipam Ruivah	90
4	(India) Rahul KP	89
5	(India) Sandeep Singh	88

Top goalscorers
Rank	Player	Goals
1	(Greece) Dimitrios Diamantakos	28
2	(Uruguay) Adrián Luna	15
2	(Nigeria) Bartholomew Ogbeche	15
4	(Ghana) Kwame Peprah	14
4	(Morocco) Noah Sadaoui	14

== Reserves and academy ==
=== Kerala Blasters Reserves ===
On 20 February 2018, the All India Football Federation, the organising body for Indian football announced the Kerala Blasters and six other ISL sides would field a reserve team in the I-League 2nd Division, India's second division football league. The team began playing in March 2018, when it was coached by Renjith TA. The team's best performance came out in 2020 as they won the 2019–20 Kerala Premier League after defeating the reserve side of Gokulam Kerala FC in a Penalty shootout.

=== Kerala Blasters Youth and Academy ===
The Kerala Blasters youth system, which is known as KBFC Young Blasters, consists of three teams from the under-18, under-15 and under-13 age groups.

== In media ==
Kerala Blasters were featured in the Manorama's programme 'Blasting out with Blasters', which shared in-depth interviews with the players and behind-the-scenes footages from the club's camp during the 2017–18 season. On 19 November 2020, a day ahead of the 2020–21 ISL season, the Blasters released Yennum Yellow, a musical album inspired by the passionate fanbase of the club across the globe. The album consists of six songs that shows the importance of yellow to its fans and it was the first time in India that a football club released an album as a dedication to their fans. A week later, the Blasters also launched the Yennum Yellow comic book envisioned to provide the fans with a fun way to learn more about the club, its history, the squad and the activities being carried out by the club. This was also a first of its kind project in Indian Football.

== eSports ==
The organizers of ISL introduced eISL, a FIFA video game tournament, for the ISL playing clubs, each represented by two players. Kerala Blasters hosted a series of qualifying games for all the participants wanting to represent the club in eISL.

=== Roster ===
Kerala Blasters FC eSports FIFA roster
Players
Coaches

Handle	Name	Nationality
A-K-S-H-A-T08	Khandelwal, Akshat	India
lokmanyu06	Chaturvedi, Lokmanyu	India

Head coach

- Vacant

Legend:
- (I) Inactive
- (S) Suspended
- Substitute
- (injured) Injury / Illness

Latest roster transaction: 19 November 2021.

== Honours ==
- Indian Super League
  - Cup Runners-up (3): 2014, 2016, 2021–22

== See also ==
- Football in Kerala
- Football in India
