= Jakub Podaný =

Czech footballer

Personal information
- Full name: Jakub Podaný
- Date of birth: 15 June 1987 (age 39)
- Place of birth: Přerov, Czechoslovakia
- Height: 1.84 m (6 ft 0 in)
- Positions: Left-back; left midfielder

Youth career
- Sparta Prague

Senior career*
Years	Team	Apps	(Gls)
2009–2015	Sparta Prague	30	(1)
2009–2010	→ Bohemians (Střížkov) (loan)	5	(0)
2010	→ Senica (loan)	9	(0)
2012	→ Sigma Olomouc (loan)	11	(2)
2012–2013	→ Teplice (loan)	20	(2)
2013–2014	→ AEL Kalloni (loan)	34	(1)
2014	→ Atlético de Kolkata (loan)	11	(2)
2015–2016	Slovan Bratislava	25	(0)
2016–2020	Dukla Prague	73	(5)
2019–2020	→ Bohemians 1905 (loan)	21	(2)
2020–2021	Jablonec	14	(0)
- * Club domestic league appearances and goals

Jakub Podaný (born 15 June 1987) is a former Czech football player. He was a player for Sparta Prague between 2009 and 2015, although he played on loan at clubs in Greece, Slovakia, and India, as well as his native Czech Republic during that period. Towards the end of his career, Podaný was a permanent player for Slovan Bratislava, Dukla Prague, and Jablonec.

== Career ==
=== Sparta and loans ===
Podaný played for Sparta Prague between 2009 and 2015, going out on loan numerous times during that period.

Podaný played 11 matches and scored two goals for Indian Super League team Atlético de Kolkata in 2014. In the 2014 Indian Super League final, Podaný assisted the only goal of the game, scored by Mohammed Rafique, as his team won the inaugural competition.

=== Later career ===
Podaný headed to Slovakia in 2015, signing a two-year contract with Slovak First Football League side Slovan Bratislava. He moved back to the Czech Republic a year later, joining Dukla Prague in July 2016 as one of three defenders to join the club as free agents during the off-season. He scored his first league goal for Dukla in the first match after the Czech First League's winter break in February 2017, away against Hradec Králové. His goal, which came from a direct free kick, opened the scoring in the match which finished 2–0 to the visitors.

After Dukla Prague's relegation during the 2018–19 Czech First League, Podaný joined First League side Bohemians 1905 on a season-long loan for the 2019–20 season. He then left Dukla permanently, signing for Jablonec in the summer of 2020. In 2021, Podaný continued his football on an amateur level, featuring for Regional Championship (fifth-tier) side SK Hřebeč and sustaining a knee injury in a game against TJ Klíčany.

== Honours ==
Atlético de Kolkata

- Indian Super League: 2014

Slovan Bratislava

- Slovak Cup runner-up: 2015–16
