= Iain Hume =

Canadian soccer player and manager

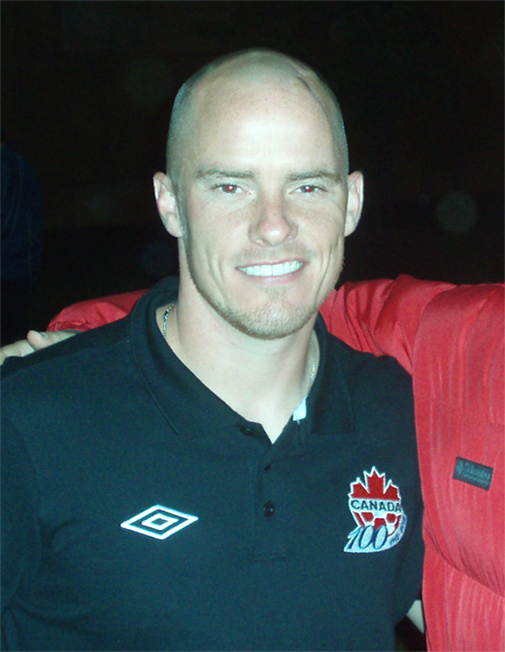
- Hume after a match with Canada in 2012

Personal information
- Full name: Iain Edward Hume
- Date of birth: 30 October 1983 (age 43)
- Place of birth: Edinburgh, Scotland
- Height: 1.70 m (5 ft 7 in)
- Position: Striker

Team information
- Current team: Woodstock FC (manager)

Senior career*
Years	Team	Apps	(Gls)
2000–2005	Tranmere Rovers	149	(32)
2005–2008	Leicester City	122	(33)
2008–2011	Barnsley	51	(9)
2010–2011	→ Preston North End (loan)	14	(4)
2011–2014	Preston North End	61	(19)
2012–2013	→ Doncaster Rovers (loan)	33	(7)
2014	→ Fleetwood Town (loan)	8	(1)
2014	Kerala Blasters	16	(5)
2015	Tranmere Rovers	12	(0)
2015–2016	Atlético de Kolkata	30	(18)
2016	→ Ponferradina (loan)	7	(0)
2017	Extremadura	10	(1)
2017–2018	Kerala Blasters	13	(5)
2018–2019	Pune City	10	(1)
Total		536	(135)

International career
2001–2003	Canada U20	18	(7)
2003–2016	Canada	43	(6)

Managerial career
- 2020–: Woodstock FC
- * Club domestic league appearances and goals

Iain Edward Hume (born 30 October 1983) is a soccer manager and former professional soccer player who played as a forward.

He began his career at Tranmere Rovers in 2000, and six years later moved to Leicester City for an initial £500,000 fee. Three years later he was signed by Barnsley for £1.2 million, where he suffered a serious head injury in a match against Sheffield United. He later played for Preston North End, and was loaned to Doncaster Rovers and Fleetwood Town, where he won League One and the League Two play-offs respectively.

In 2014, Hume joined Kerala Blasters FC of the newly formed Indian Super League, and played the next two seasons with Atlético de Kolkata, winning the 2016 ISL season before returning to Kerala Blasters in 2017–18 Indian Super League. He then played for FC Pune City next season in ISL.

Hume was born in Edinburgh, Scotland, but played internationally for Canada. He debuted for them in 2003 and represented the nation at three CONCACAF Gold Cups.

== Early life ==
Hume was born in Edinburgh to Scottish parents. At the age of one, he relocated to Canada with his family and was raised in Brampton, Ontario.

Whilst on tour with the Canada under-18 team, a 15-year-old Hume played a friendly match against English club Tranmere Rovers. Hume joined Tranmere on trial, eventually signing for the club after impressing for their under-16 team.

== Club career ==
=== Tranmere Rovers ===
Hume progressed through the youth ranks at Tranmere Rovers, making his professional debut on 15 April 2000 as a 76th-minute substitute for Nick Henry in a 3–1 First Division loss at Swindon Town. On 29 October 2002, he scored his first professional goal; two minutes after replacing Stuart Barlow, he headed in Gareth Roberts' free kick to open a 1–1 draw with Peterborough United at Prenton Park. He scored six goals from 23 games that Second Division season, including both of Tranmere's goals in a 2–1 win over Blackpool on 22 February 2003, ending the visitors' 12-game unbeaten run.

On 13 January 2004, Hume scored the winner in the first minute of extra time, as Tranmere defeated Premier League club Bolton Wanderers 2–1 in the third round replay of the FA Cup. In the next round, he again scored the winner, from 20 yards for a 2–1 home victory against Swansea City on 14 February. The team were eliminated in the quarter-finals by eventual finalists Millwall.

His best season for Tranmere was during the 2004–05 campaign where he finished as the club's top scorer with 16 goals, including braces in a 2–1 win at Torquay United on 25 September 2004 and a 4–5 home defeat to Bradford City on 16 October.

=== Leicester City ===
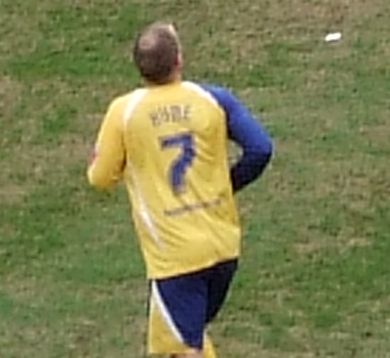
Hume playing for Leicester City in 2008

Signed on transfer deadline day at the end of August 2005, Hume was Craig Levein's most expensive signing in his first year as manager. He was bought as a direct replacement for David Connolly who moved to Wigan the same day. Hume put pen-to-paper on a three-year deal after leaving Tranmere where he made 176 appearances, scoring 37 goals. The fee for Hume was an initial £500,000 that could rise to £750,000, while Tranmere were entitled to a 10% sell-on clause.

Hume made his debut for Leicester in the Championship on 10 September, replacing Elvis Hammond for the final 13 minutes of a 2–0 win over Sheffield Wednesday at the Walkers Stadium. On 1 October, he scored his first goal for the team, an 86th-minute opener in a 1–1 draw at Derby County, and on 26 November he added two more in a 4–2 home win over Sheffield United. He finished his first season with the Foxes with 9 goals from 37 games, including one each in three consecutive matches in February 2006.

Hume signed a new three-year deal on 5 June 2007 to stay at the club. He scored his first goal of the 2007–08 season against Watford on 25 August, and was named in the Championship Team of the Week two days later. The goal was voted Goal of the Season on 28 April 2008. Despite scoring a goal in his 100th match for Leicester on 11 December, his team still lost 3–1 to Ipswich. Hume scored his 30th goal for Leicester on 16 February 2008, beating Norwich City 4–0. Despite finishing as the club's top goalscorer with 11 league goals, Hume could not prevent Leicester from being relegated at the end of the season.

=== Barnsley ===
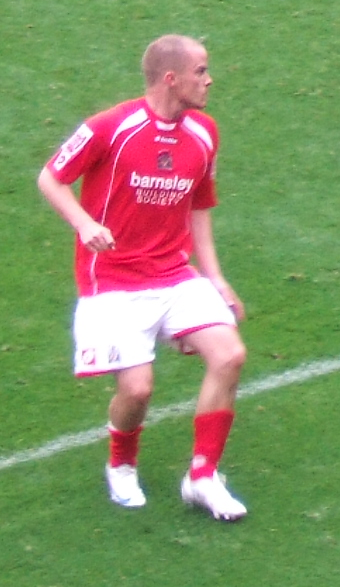
Hume with Barnsley in August 2008

Despite announcing that he would stay at Leicester, on 25 June 2008, Barnsley secured the signing of Hume for £1.2 million. On 9 August, the opening day of the Championship season, Hume scored just five minutes into his Barnsley debut away to Queens Park Rangers, but the Tykes lost the game 2–1. He was sent off on his home debut eight days later, a loss by the same score to Coventry City at Oakwell. On his return on 30 August, he scored what BBC Sport called a "spectacular volley" to open a 2–0 win over Derby, and in October he netted in victories against Yorkshire rivals Doncaster Rovers and Sheffield Wednesday, the former seeing his team come from a goal down to win 4–1 with ten men.

On 8 November 2008, Hume sustained a fractured skull and internal bleeding following an elbow to the head, prior to challenging for the ball, from Chris Morgan against Sheffield United. He was taken to hospital with life-threatening injuries, and underwent surgery. The opposing club issued a statement that "Sheffield United are saddened and concerned to hear that Barnsley striker Iain Hume is being monitored in a high dependency unit following last Saturday's fixture, and we wish him a speedy and full recovery."

Later in November, Hume was discharged, while the FA decided that they would not discipline Morgan. Barnsley manager Simon Davey criticised this decision, opining that Morgan and referee Andy D'Urso should have been suspended and claiming that different action would have been taken if Cristiano Ronaldo were injured. Hume was left with an 18-inch horseshoe-shaped scar and cognitive difficulties.

After missing the remainder of the season, Hume made his return to the team with a 50th-minute substitute appearance against Gainsborough on 21 July 2009, nearly scoring from a header with his first touch of the game. He scored five goals in 35 games in his second season, including two in a 2–2 home draw against Peterborough United on 5 April 2010 which relegated the opponents to League One.

=== Preston North End ===
Hume joined Preston North End on 17 September 2010, on a three-month loan. He made his debut the next day in a 0–1 home loss against Norwich City and scored his first goal for the Lilywhites the following Saturday at Coventry, a right-footed shot from 20 yards, following this with the final goal in the 6–4 comeback win at Leeds United on the 28th. On 23 October it was announced that Hume would return to Barnsley following a poor run of results for his parent club. However, five days later, his loan was extended, with Paul Hayes going the other way to Barnsley with view to a permanent deal for Hume in January. Hume moved to Preston in the January 2011 transfer window for an undisclosed fee. At the end of the season, Preston were relegated to League One, following a dismal season with only 42 points. He led the team with 12 goals in the Championship and became the first player from Preston following relegation to come out publicly committing himself to the team for the following season. In his second season at Preston, Hume scored 9 goals in 28 league games, including braces in a 4–3 win at Wycombe Wanderers on 27 September 2011 and a 2–1 triumph at Exeter City the following 17 March; his goals in the latter were the 100th and 101st of his career.

On 31 August 2012, Hume signed for Doncaster Rovers on loan until January 2013, a deal that was extended till the end of the season. He made his debut for the club the following day as a second-half substitute for Kyle Bennett against Yeovil Town, the game ended in a 2–1 defeat at Huish Park. Hume then went on to score in a 2–0 victory over Leyton Orient and a crucial added-time winner against leaders Tranmere. His 7 goals from 33 league games helped Rovers to the 2012–13 Football League One title, his first honour.

On 20 March 2014, Hume joined League Two side Fleetwood Town until the end of the season. The move reunited him with Graham Alexander, his captain at Preston North End. Hume was assigned the number 36 shirt. He made his debut two days later, as a half-time replacement for Stewart Murdoch in a 2–0 loss at Exeter. Hume made eight appearances for the Cod Army, scoring once, an 85th-minute strike to secure a 2–2 home draw with Lancashire rivals Morecambe on 12 April. The team qualified for the play-offs, where they beat York City in the semi-finals and then Burton Albion 1–0 in the final at Wembley Stadium, which Hume started.

=== Later career ===
On 21 August 2014, Hume was drafted by the Kerala Blasters of the newly founded Indian Super League, joining Player-Manager David James and Michael Chopra at the club. In their first game on 21 October, away to Chennaiyin FC, he scored their first goal to equalise in an eventual 2–1 loss. Five days later, he equalised again at Atlético de Kolkata for a 1–1 draw which gave the team their first point, and on 21 November his fourth-minute goal opened a 2–1 win over the same team at the Jawaharlal Nehru Stadium in Kochi.

Hume's fourth goal was the game's only against FC Pune City on 9 December in the last game of the regular season, qualifying Kerala to the playoffs. Four days later, in the semi-final first leg, he scored in a 3–0 win over regular season winners Chennaiyin, and played the full 90 minutes of the inaugural final, a 1–0 loss to Kolkata at the DY Patil Stadium in Mumbai. Hume earned the nickname "ഹ്യൂമേട്ടൻ (Humettan)", meaning "elder brother Hume" in Malayalam, and was voted the best player of the league's first season.

On 29 January 2015, Hume signed a six-month contract with his first club Tranmere Rovers, now in League Two. After 12 scoreless games in a season which saw the club relegated to the Conference, Hume was one of seven players released by the club on 6 May.

Hume returned for the second season of the Indian Super League on 5 June 2015, when he signed for Atlético de Kolkata. He made his debut on 3 October as they began the season with a 3–2 win at Chennaiyin, and scored his first goals in the form of a hat-trick on 1 November in a 4–1 win at Mumbai City FC, and added another treble 26 days later in a win by the same score over Pune at the Salt Lake Stadium. The latter result caused the team to be the first to qualify for the season's play-offs. On 4 December, in the last game of regular play at home to Mumbai, Hume scored a penalty for his tenth goal of the season in a 2–3 loss. In the play-off semi-final second leg, he scored again in a 2–1 home win over Chennaiyin, a 2–4 aggregate elimination. With 11 goals, he was second place in the Indian Super League Golden Boot, two goals behind winner Stiven Mendoza; however, he won the season's Fittest Player award.

On 8 February 2016, Hume signed with SD Ponferradina of Spain's Segunda División until the end of the season. He played seven times for the team from Castile and León, who ended up relegated.

On 13 June 2016 it was announced that Hume was retained by Atlético de Kolkata and would be returning to the side for the 2016 season. He was the league's second top scorer with 7 goals as the team won the title, behind Delhi Dynamos' Marcelinho; this haul included a brace in a 3–2 win over Mumbai in the semi-finals first leg.

On 1 February 2017, Hume returned to Spain, joining Segunda División B club Extremadura UD for the remainder of the season. He scored his only goal in Spanish football on 7 May, opening a 2–0 win over Atlético Sanluqueño CF at the Estadio Francisco de la Hera to save his team from relegation.

On 24 July 2017, Hume re-signed for Kerala Blasters ahead of the 2017–18 Indian Super League. He opened his account for the campaign on 10 January, scoring a hat-trick in a 3–1 win at Delhi Dynamos.

After not playing professionally since 2019, in November 2022 Hume confirmed he was retired.

== International career ==
At age 15, Hume turned down the opportunity to represent Scotland at under-16 level, saying that he is more devoted to Canada.

Hume played at the 2001 FIFA World Youth Championship in Argentina, alongside Atiba Hutchinson and Mike Klukowski among others. He starred for Canada at the 2003 FIFA World Youth Championship. He scored three goals, including the game winner versus Czech Republic. The win over the Czech's qualified Canada for the round of 16, where they eliminated Burkina Faso on a goal by Josh Simpson. In the quarter finals, Hume scored the equaliser in the 53rd minute to send their game against Spain to extra time. Canada eventually bowed out to the Spanish by a 2–1 scoreline. It is Canada's best showing at a FIFA male event.

He made his senior debut for Canada in a February 2003 friendly match against Libya.

Coming on as a substitute in the 2007 CONCACAF Gold Cup semi-final versus the United States, he made an immediate impact, making his presence known through a few tough tackles and a remarkable goal, snapping Canada's 705-minute scoring drought in matches versus the United States. Minutes later he kept Canada within a goal's reach courtesy of a goal-line clearance with his heel, to deny Clint Dempsey a goal.

== Personal life ==
Hume is a supporter of Liverpool and Hearts. He idolised Ian Rush, John Barnes and John Robertson as a child.

In September 2020, it was reported that Hume, his wife and two children have moved to Woodstock, Ontario. He was a guest head coach for the Woodstock F.C. Premier Stallions and assistant with the Division 2 Stallions.

== Career statistics ==
=== Club ===
Appearances and goals by club, season and competition
Club	Season	League			National cup		League cup		Other (Note: Includes play-offs and Football League Trophy.)		Total	
Club	Season	Division	Apps	Goals	Apps	Goals	Apps	Goals	Apps	Goals	Apps	Goals
Tranmere Rovers	1999–00	Division One	3	0	0	0	0	0	0	0	3	0
Tranmere Rovers	2000–01	Division One	10	0	1	0	0	0	0	0	11	0
Tranmere Rovers	2001–02	Division Two	13	0	0	0	2	0	1	0	16	0
Tranmere Rovers	2002–03	Division Two	35	6	1	0	1	0	2	0	39	6
Tranmere Rovers	2003–04	Division Two	40	10	7	3	2	0	1	1	50	14
Tranmere Rovers	2004–05	League One	42	15	1	0	2	0	5	1	50	16
Tranmere Rovers	2005–06	League One	6	1	0	0	1	0	0	0	7	1
Tranmere Rovers	Total		149	32	10	3	8	0	9	2	176	37
Leicester City	2005–06	Championship	37	9	1	0	0	0	0	0	38	9
Leicester City	2006–07	Championship	45	13	2	0	3	1	0	0	50	14
Leicester City	2007–08	Championship	40	11	1	0	3	0	0	0	44	11
Leicester City	Total		122	33	4	0	6	1	0	0	132	34
Barnsley	2008–09	Championship	15	4	0	0	1	0	0	0	16	4
Barnsley	2009–10	Championship	35	5	0	0	2	0	0	0	37	5
Barnsley	2010–11	Championship	1	0	0	0	1	0	0	0	2	0
Barnsley	Total		51	9	0	0	4	0	0	0	55	9
Preston North End (loan)	2010–11	Championship	14	4	0	0	0	0	0	0	14	4
Preston North End	2010–11	Championship	17	8	0	0	0	0	0	0	17	8
Preston North End	2011–12	League One	28	9	0	0	1	1	0	0	29	10
Preston North End	2012–13	League One	0	0	0	0	0	0	0	0	0	0
Preston North End	2013–14	League One	16	2	2	0	2	0	0	0	20	2
Preston North End	Total		61	19	2	0	3	1	0	0	66	20
Doncaster Rovers (loan)	2012–13	League One	33	7	1	1	1	0	1	0	36	8
Fleetwood Town (loan)	2013–14	League Two	8	1	0	0	0	0	3	0	11	1
Kerala Blasters	2014	Indian Super League	16	5	0	0	0	0	0	0	16	5
Tranmere Rovers	2014–15	League Two	12	0	0	0	0	0	0	0	12	0
Atlético de Kolkata	2015	Indian Super League	16	11	0	0	0	0	0	0	16	11
Atlético de Kolkata	2016	Indian Super League	14	7	0	0	0	0	0	0	14	7
Atlético de Kolkata	Total		30	18	0	0	0	0	0	0	30	18
Ponferradina (loan)	2015–16	Segunda División	7	0	0	0	0	0	0	0	7	0
Extremadura	2016–17	Segunda División B	10	1	0	0	0	0	0	0	10	1
Kerala Blasters	2017–18	Indian Super League	13	5	0	0	0	0	0	0	13	5
Pune City	2018–19	Indian Super League	10	1	0	0	0	0	0	0	10	1
Career total			536	135	17	4	22	2	13	2	588	143

=== International ===
Scores and results list Canada's goal tally first, score column indicates score after each Hume goal.

List of international goals scored by Iain Hume
No.	Date	Venue	Opponent	Score	Result	Competition
1	16 November 2005	Stade Alphonse Theis, Hesperange, Luxembourg	Luxembourg	1–0	1–0	Friendly match
2	21 June 2007	Soldier Field, Chicago, United States	United States	1–2	1–2	2007 CONCACAF Gold Cup
3	6 September 2011	Estadio Juan Ramón Loubriel, Bayamon, Puerto Rico	Puerto Rico	1–0	3–0	2014 FIFA World Cup qualification
4	7 October 2011	Beausejour Stadium, Gros Islet, Saint Lucia	Saint Lucia	6–0	7–0	2014 FIFA World Cup qualification
5	7 October 2011	Beausejour Stadium, Gros Islet, Saint Lucia	Saint Lucia	7–0	7–0	2014 FIFA World Cup qualification
6	16 October 2012	Estadio Olímpico Metropolitano, San Pedro Sula, Honduras	Honduras	1–6	1–8	2014 FIFA World Cup qualification

== Honours ==
Doncaster Rovers

- Football League One: 2012–13

Fleetwood Town

- Football League Two play-offs: 2014

Atletico de Kolkata

- Indian Super League: 2016

Individual

- Indian Super League Hero of the League: 2014
- ISL Fittest Player: 2015
- ISL Team of the Year: 2014, 2016
