= Arnal Llibert =

Spanish footballer

Arnal
Personal information
- Full name: Arnal Llibert Conde Carbó
- Date of birth: 21 January 1980 (age 46)
- Place of birth: Girona, Spain
- Height: 1.74 m (5 ft 8 1/2 in)
- Position: Forward

Team information
- Current team: Brighton & Hove Albion (director of scouting)

Youth career
- 1995–1996: Castelfollit
- 1996–1998: Garrotxa
- 1998–1999: Espanyol

Senior career*
Years	Team	Apps	(Gls)
1999–2001	Espanyol B	34	(13)
2001–2002	Leganés	35	(6)
2002–2004	Elche	33	(4)
2004–2005	Lleida	30	(3)
2005	Racing Ferrol	11	(0)
2006	Córdoba	16	(4)
2006–2007	Sant Andreu	38	(8)
2007–2009	Girona	55	(10)
2009–2010	Sabadell	30	(6)
2010	AEK Larnaca	12	(2)
2011	Doxa	8	(4)
2011–2013	Alki Larnaca	34	(11)
2013	Ethnikos Achna	10	(2)
2013	Valletta	0	(0)
2013–2014	Olot	12	(1)
2014	Alcorcón	10	(1)
2014	Atlético Kolkata	11	(1)

Managerial career
- 2017–2018: Levante (scout)
- 2018–2019: Gimnàstic Tarragona (sporting director)
- 2019–2020: AEK Larnaca (technical director)
- 2022–2024: Brighton & Hove Albion (scout)
- 2025–: Brighton & Hove Albion (director of scouting)
- * Club domestic league appearances and goals

Arnal Llibert Conde Carbó (born 21 January 1980), known simply as Arnal, is a Spanish professional football official and a former forward. He is the director of scouting for Brighton & Hove Albion.

== Club career ==
Born in Girona, Catalonia, Arnal started playing as a senior with RCD Espanyol's reserves in Segunda División B. He made his professional debut with CD Leganés in the 2001–02 season in Segunda División, representing also in that tier Elche CF, UE Lleida, Racing de Ferrol, Girona FC and AD Alcorcón and amassing totals in the competition of 145 games and 17 goals over the course of seven seasons.

Arnal moved abroad for the first time in his career in the summer of 2010, aged nearly 30, and spent the better of the next four years competing in the Cypriot First Division, with AEK Larnaca FC, Doxa Katokopias FC, Alki Larnaca FC and Ethnikos Achna FC. On 21 August 2014, he was a fourth-round pick for Atlético de Kolkata in the inaugural Indian Super League draft.

In the league's opening match on 12 October 2014, Arnal scored the last goal in a 3–0 win over Mumbai City FC.

== Club statistics ==
As of 22 December 2014

Club	Season	League			Cup		Other		Total	
Club	Season	Division	Apps	Goals	Apps	Goals	Apps	Goals	Apps	Goals
Espanyol B	1998–99	Segunda División B	2	0	—				2	0
Espanyol B	2000–01	Segunda División B	32	13	—		6 (Note: Appearances in Segunda División play-offs)	0	38	13
Espanyol B	Total		34	13	—		6	0	40	13
Leganés	2001–02	Segunda División	35	6	0	0	—		35	6
Leganés	Total		35	6	0	0	—		35	6
Elche	2002–03	Segunda División	17	2	1	0	—		18	2
Elche	2003–04	Segunda División	16	2	0	0	—		16	2
Elche	Total		33	4	1	0	—		34	4
Lleida	2004–05	Segunda División	30	3	3	1	—		33	4
Lleida	Total		30	3	3	1	—		33	4
Racing Ferrol	2005–06	Segunda División	11	0	1	0	—		12	0
Racing Ferrol	Total		11	0	1	0	—		12	0
Córdoba	2005–06	Segunda División B	16	4	0	0	—		16	4
Córdoba	Total		16	4	0	0	—		16	4
Sant Andreu	2006–07	Segunda División B	38	8	1	0	—		39	8
Sant Andreu	Total		38	8	1	0	—		39	8
Girona	2007–08	Segunda División B	29	7	0	0	4	0	33	7
Girona	2008–09	Segunda División	26	3	2	0	—		28	3
Girona	Total		55	10	2	0	4	0	61	10
Sabadell	2009–10	Segunda División B	30	6	0	0	—		30	6
Sabadell	Total		30	6	0	0	—		30	6
AEK Larnaca	2010–11	Cypriot First Division	12	2	0	0	—		12	2
AEK Larnaca	Total		12	2	0	0	—		12	2
Doxa	2010–11	Cypriot First Division	8	4	0	0	—		8	4
Doxa	Total		8	4	0	0	—		8	4
Alki Larnaca	2011–12	Cypriot First Division	28	11	4	3	—		32	14
Alki Larnaca	2012–13	Cypriot First Division	12	2	0	0	—		12	2
Alki Larnaca	Total		40	13	4	3	—		44	16
Ethnikos Achna	2012–13	Cypriot First Division	15	2	1	0	—		16	2
Ethnikos Achna	Total		15	2	1	0	—		16	2
Valletta	2013–14	Maltese Premier League	0	0	0	0	1 (Note: Appearances in UEFA Europa League)	0	1	0
Valletta	Total		0	0	0	0	1	0	1	0
Olot	2013–14	Segunda División B	12	1	2	1	—		14	2
Olot	Total		12	2	2	1	—		14	2
Alcorcón	2013–14	Segunda División	10	1	0	0	—		10	1
Alcorcón	Total		10	1	0	0	—		10	1
Atlético Kolkata	2014	Indian Super League	11	1	—				11	1
Atlético Kolkata	Total		11	1	—				11	1
Career total			395	77	15	5	10	0	420	82

== Honours ==
Girona

- Segunda División B: 2007–08

Atlético Kolkata

- Indian Super League: 2014
