= Edgar Marcelino =

Portuguese footballer (born 1984)

Personal information
- Full name: Edgar Carvalho Figueira Marcelino
- Date of birth: 10 September 1984 (age 42)
- Place of birth: Coimbra, Portugal
- Height: 1.70 m (5 ft 7 in)
- Position: Winger

Youth career
- 1996–1997: Académica
- 1997–2002: Sporting CP

Senior career*
Years	Team	Apps	(Gls)
2002–2004	Sporting B	63	(10)
2004–2005	→ F.C. Penafiel (loan)	20	(1)
2005–2006	→ RBC Roosendaal (loan)	26	(0)
2006	Vitória Guimarães	6	(0)
2007–2008	Omonia Nicosia	18	(1)
2008	Racing de Ferrol	12	(0)
2009–2011	APOP Kinyras	13	(1)
2011	Estoril	3	(0)
2011–2012	KAC	17	(1)
2013	AEP Paphos	8	(0)
2013–2014	Al-Seeb	21	(4)
2014	FC Goa	3	(1)
2015	Pune	11	(0)
2016	Karmiotissa	5	(0)
2017	Acharnaikos	9	(2)
2017–2018	Zakynthos		
2018	Richmond	5	(1)
2018–2019	Amora	10	(1)
2019–2020	Fabril Barreiro	13	(1)
2021	Atlético Malveira	3	(0)
2021	União Serpense	11	(0)
2024	Porto Salvo	4	(0)

International career
2004–2005	Portugal U21	3	(2)

Managerial career
- 2022: União Serpense (general director)
- * Club domestic league appearances and goals

Edgar Carvalho Figueira Marcelino (born 10 September 1984) is a Portuguese professional footballer who played as a winger.

== Club career ==
Born in Coimbra, Marcelino started his career at Sporting CP, but never represented the main squad, going on to have consecutive loan stints. He made his professional debut with F.C. Penafiel, first appearing in a 1–1 home draw against Rio Ave; he was an important attacking element throughout the season, as his team retained their Primeira Liga status.

For 2005–06, Marcelino was loaned to Dutch Eredivisie's RBC Roosendaal, which dropped down a level at the end of the campaign. Subsequently, released by Sporting, he joined Vitória de Guimarães in the second division, but left in January 2007 to Cypriot side Omonia Nicosia, where he failed to establish himself.

Marcelino moved countries again in 2008–09, moving to Spanish third level team Racing de Ferrol. However, in January 2009, he returned to Cyprus with APOP Kinyras, joining several other compatriots in the squad and being released exactly two years later.

In 2013, after one year in Morocco, Marcelino signed a contract with Omani club Al-Seeb. On 21 August of the following year, he was drafted by FC Goa to play in the inaugural edition of the Indian Super League. He scored his first and only goal for the club on 10 December, helping to a 1–1 draw with Atlético de Kolkata.

Marcelino was signed by another Indian side on 22 January 2015, I-League's Pune, completing the team's foreign quota after replacing Liberian Eric Brown. He made his debut the following day, starting against title holders Bengaluru FC, providing an assist for Luciano Sabrosa in the 25th minute and being replaced later on in an eventual 3–1 win.

On 12 January 2016, Marcelino joined Cypriot Second Division club Karmiotissa FC.

== Career statistics ==
As of 17 May 2015

Appearances and goals by club, season and competition
Club	Season	League			Cup		Continental		Total	
Club	Season	Division	Apps	Goals	Apps	Goals	Apps	Goals	Apps	Goals
Sporting B	2001–02	Portuguese Second Division	1	0	—		—		1	0
Sporting B	2002–03	Portuguese Second Division	24	1	—		—		24	1
Sporting B	2003–04	Portuguese Second Division	38	9	—		—		38	9
Sporting B	Total		63	10	0	0	0	0	63	10
F.C. Penafiel	2004–05	Primeira Liga	20	1	2	0	—		22	1
RBC Roosendaal	2006–07	Eredivisie	26	0	1	0	—		27	0
Vitória Guimarães	2006–07	Primeira Liga	6	0	1	0	—		7	0
Omonia Nicosia	2006–07	Cypriot First Division	3	1	0	0	—		3	1
Omonia Nicosia	2007–08	Cypriot First Division	15	0	2	0	—		17	0
Omonia Nicosia	Total		18	1	2	0	0	0	20	1
Racing de Ferrol	2008–09	Segunda División B	12	0	1	0	—		13	0
APOP Kinyras	2008–09	Cypriot First Division	9	1	4	0	—		13	1
APOP Kinyras	2009–10	Cypriot First Division	1	0	1	0	2 (Note: Appearances in UEFA Europa League qualifiers)	1	4	1
APOP Kinyras	2010–11	Cypriot First Division	3	0	1	0	2	1	6	1
APOP Kinyras	Total		13	1	6	0	4	2	23	3
Estoril	2010–11	Segunda Liga	3	0	0	0	—		3	0
KAC	2011–12	Botola 2	17	1	0	0	—		17	1
AEP Paphos	2012–13	Cypriot First Division	8	0	2	0	—		10	0
Al-Seeb	2013–14	Oman Professional League	21	4	0	0	—		21	4
Goa	2014	Indian Super League	3	1	—		—		3	1
Pune	2015	I-League	11	0	—		—		11	0
Career total			221	19	15	0	4	2	240	23

== Honours ==
APOP

- Cypriot Cup: 2008–09
