= Pedro Gusmão =

Brazilian footballer

Personal information
- Full name: Pedro Adriano Veloso Gusmão
- Date of birth: 4 June 1992 (age 34)
- Place of birth: Bacabal, Maranhão, Brazil
- Height: 1.77 m (5 ft 10 in)
- Positions: Forward; winger

Team information
- Current team: CSA
- Number: 9

Senior career*
Years	Team	Apps	(Gls)
2011	Guarani	0	(0)
2012	Santa Cruz	0	(0)
2012	Ypiranga	5	(1)
2013	Bacabal	1	(0)
2013	Atlético Paranaense	1	(0)
2013	→ Ferroviária (on loan)	1	(0)
2014	→ Kerala Blasters (on loan)	7	(1)
2015	→ Moto Club (on loan)		
2016	CSA		
- * Club domestic league appearances and goals

Pedro Adriano Veloso Gusmão, also known as Pedro Gusmao, is a Brazilian footballer who currently plays for Moto Clube.

== Clubs ==
Pedro saw many transfers in his career.

=== Bacabal ===
Pedro played on his hometown's team called Bacabal Esporte Clube. He did many goals and, for a little time, was the player who did more goals on Brazil.

=== Ypiranga ===
Pedro has made his first senior career appearance for Ypiranga Futebol Clube. This was the team for which he scored his first goal against Petrolina SFC.

=== Atletico-PR ===
Pedro had played only one match for Atlético Paranaense.

=== Kerala Blasters ===
He was drafted by Kerala Blasters in Indian Super League to play in the inaugural season of it. In only his 4th match for Kerala Blasters against Atlético de Kolkata, he not only scored one goal but also assisted one goal, which made him receive the 'Hero of the Match' award.
