= Raphaël Romey =

French footballer (born 1981)

Personal information
- Date of birth: 26 February 1981 (age 45)
- Place of birth: Seoul, South Korea
- Height: 1.86 m (6 ft 1 in)
- Position: Defender

Team information
- Current team: Fréjus Saint-Raphaël
- Number: 22

Senior career*
Years	Team	Apps	(Gls)
1997–1998	Grenoble	0	(0)
1998–2000	Valence	0	(0)
2000–2002	Saint-Marcellin	?	(?)
2002–2004	Échirolles	?	(?)
2004–2005	Cassis Carnoux	?	(?)
2005–2006	Brignoles	?	(?)
2006–2007	Marseille Endoume	4	(0)
2007–2008	Consolat Marseille	?	(?)
2008–2009	Romorantin	18	(1)
2009–2010	Toulon	22	(0)
2010–2011	Bayonne	36	(0)
2011–2013	Gazélec Ajaccio	62	(1)
2013–2014	CA Bastia	14	(0)
2014–2015	Kerala Blasters	7	(0)
2015	Istres	13	(1)
2015–2016	Excelsior Virton	21	(2)
2016–2017	Fréjus Saint-Raphaël	7	(0)
- * Club domestic league appearances and goals as of 08:37, 21 August 2017 (UTC)

Raphaël Romey (born 26 February 1981) is a French former professional footballer.

== Kerala Blasters ==
On 21 August 2014, Romey was drafted by Indian Super League side Kerala Blasters.
