= Erwin Spitzner =

Brazilian footballer (born 1994)

Personal information
- Date of birth: 29 April 1994 (age 32)
- Place of birth: São Bento do Sul, Brazil
- Height: 1.85 m (6 ft 1 in)
- Position: Defender

Team information
- Current team: EC São Bernardo

Youth career
- Atlético Paranaense

Senior career*
Years	Team	Apps	(Gls)
2012–	Atlético Paranaense	0	(0)
2013–2014	→ PSTC (loan)	0	(0)
2014–2015	→ Kerala Blasters (loan)	0	(0)
2015–2016	→ Foz do Iguaçu (loan)	0	(0)
2016	→ Desportiva Ferroviária (loan)	1	(0)
2018	→ Inter de Lages (loan)	0	(0)
2016	→ Paranavaí (loan)	0	(0)
2017	Grêmio Prudente	0	(0)
2017–2018	Foz do Iguaçu	6	(0)
2019	Rio Branco	0	(0)
2019	Maringá	0	(0)
2019	Andraus	0	(0)
2020	São Luiz	0	(0)
2020–	EC São Bernardo	0	(0)
- * Club domestic league appearances and goals as of 14:11, 25 June 2019 (UTC)

Erwin Spitzner (born 29 April 1994) is a Brazilian football defender who plays for EC São Bernardo.

== Biography ==
Erwin Spitzner was born in São Bento do Sul, Brazil. He started his career in the Clube Atlético Paranaense U19 side and made his senior team debut for Atlético Paranaense on 21 January 2013 against Rio Branco-PR in a 1–1 draw at home. Erwin scored his first goal for his senior team against Operário Ferroviário on 3 March 2013, which Atlético Paranaense won 3–0.

== Honours ==
- Copa do Brasil (Runner-up):
  - 2013
