= List of Kerala Blasters FC records and statistics =

Kerala Blasters Football Club is an Indian professional association football club based in Kochi, Kerala, who play in the Indian Super League. Established on 27 May 2014, they were the founding members of Indian Super League in 2014.

This list encompasses the major honours won by Kerala Blasters, records set by the club, their managers and their players. The player records section includes details of the club's leading goalscorers and those who have made most appearances in first-team competitions.

== Honours ==
Best performances in competitions entered
Competition	Best result	Championship	Runners-up
Indian Super League	Runners-up	0	3
Super Cup	Round of 16	0	0
Durand Cup	Quarter-finals	0	0

- Indian Super League
  - Runners-up (3): 2014, 2016, 2021–22

== Competitive record ==
The table that follows is accurate as of the last match against Chennaiyin on 31 October 2026.

Competition	Titles	Part	Pld	W	D	L	GF	GA	GD	Win %
Indian Super League	0	13	230	75	66	89	290	325	-35	32.61%
Super Cup	0	6	13	5	1	7	19	20	-1	38.46%
Durand Cup (Note: 5 Durand cup matches were played by the Blasters reserves.)	0	4	15	6	3	6	33	17	16	40%
Total	0	23	258	86	70	102	342	362	-20	33.33%

== Club records ==
As of 25 October 2026

=== Matches ===
==== Firsts ====
- First match: Kerala Blasters 0–1 NorthEast United, Indian Super League, 13 October 2014
- First win: Kerala Blasters 2–1 Pune City, Indian Super League, 30 October 2014
- First Super Cup match: Kerala Blasters 2–3 NEROCA, 6 April 2018
- First Durand Cup match: Kerala Blasters 1–0 Indian Navy, 11 September 2021

==== Wins ====
- Record Win : 8–0 against Mumbai City in the Durand Cup, 1 August 2024
- Record league win: 5–1 against Hyderabad in the Indian Super League, 5 January 2020
- Record away league win:
  - 1–4 against NorthEast United, 15 November 2015
  - 0–3 against Mumbai City, 19 December 2021
  - 0–3 against Chennaiyin, 22 December 2021
  - 0–3 against NorthEast United, 5 November 2022
- Record Durand Cup win: 8–0 against Mumbai City, 1 August 2024
- Record Super Cup win: 3–0 against Sporting Delhi, 3 November 2025
- Most league wins in a season: 10 wins from 21 games (during the 2022–23 season)
- Fewest league wins in a season: 2 wins from 18 games (during the 2018–19 season)
- Most home league wins in a season: 7 wins from 10 games (during the 2022–23 season)
- Most league wins away from home in a season: 3 wins from 9 games (during the 2022–23 season)

==== Defeats ====
- Record league defeat:
  - 0 - 5 against Mumbai City in the Indian Super League, 19 November 2016
  - 1–6 against Mumbai City in the Indian Super League, 16 December 2018
- Record league defeat at home:
  - 3–6 against Chennaiyin in the Indian Super League, 1 February 2020 (also record-scoring defeat)
  - 2–5 against ATK Mohun Bagan in the Indian Super League, 16 October 2022
- Record Super Cup defeat:
  - 0–2 against Indian Arrows, 15 March 2019
  - 2–0 against Sreenidi Deccan, 12 April 2023
- Record Durand Cup defeat: 0–3 against Mohammedan, 9 September 2022
- Most league defeats in a season: 9 defeats from 20 games (during the 2020–21 season)
- Fewest league defeats in a season:
  - 4 defeats from 14 games (during the 2014 season)
  - 4 defeats from 20 games (during the 2021–22 season)

==== Draws ====
- Highest scoring draw:
  - 4–4 against Odisha in the Indian Super League, 23 February 2020 (also a league record)
  - 4–4 against Goa in the Indian Super League, 6 March 2022 (also a league record)
- Most league draws in a season: 9 draws from 18 games (during the 2018–19 season)

==== Record consecutive results ====
- Record consecutive wins: 5 (from 5 November to 19 December 2022) and (from 18 April to 11 October 2026)
- Record consecutive defeats: 4 (from 13 to 27 October 2015) and (from 14 February 2026 to 7 March 2026)
- Record consecutive matches without a defeat: 8 (from 5 November 2022 to 3 January 2023)
- Record consecutive matches without a win: 14 (from 5 October 2018 to 6 February 2019)
- Record consecutive home league wins: 6 (from 13 November 2022 to 7 February 2023)
- Record consecutive home league matches without defeat: 6 (from 13 November 2022 to 7 February 2023 and 15 April 2026 to 25 October 2026)
- Record consecutive draws: 4 (from 5 October to 2 November 2018)
- Record consecutive matches without conceding a goal: 4 (from 6 to 16 November 2014)
- Record consecutive matches in which Kerala Blasters have scored a goal: 14 (from 3 December 2017 to 17 February 2018)
- Record consecutive home league defeats: 4 (from 22 February to 21 March 2026)
- Record consecutive home league matches without a win: 7 (from 5 October 2018 to 25 January 2019)

=== Goals ===
- More league goals scored in a season: 34 goals in 20 games (during the 2021–22 season)
- Fewest league goals scored in a season: 9 goals in 14 games (during the 2014 season)
- Most league goals conceded in a season: 36 goals in 20 games (during the 2020–21 season)
- Fewest league goals conceded in a season: 11 goals in 14 games (during the 2014 season)

=== Points ===
- Most points in a season: 34 points from 20 games (during the 2021–22 season)
- Fewest points in a season: 13 points from 14 games (during the 2015 season)

=== Attendance ===
- Record highest home attendance: 62,087 (against Delhi Dynamos in the Indian Super League, 18 October 2015)
- Highest average home attendance in a season: 52,008 (during the 2016 season, also a league record)
- Record lowest home attendance: 3,298 (against Chennaiyin in the Indian Super League, 15 February 2019)

== Player records ==
As of 25 October 2026

=== Appearances ===
- Most appearance in all competitions: 97, Sahal Abdul Samad
- Most league appearances: 92, Sahal Abdul Samad
- Most Super Cup appearances: 11, Danish Farooq Bhat
- Most Durand Cup appearances: 12, Mohammed Aimen (Note: Including 5 matches played with the reserve team in the 2022 Durand Cup)
- Youngest first-team player: Korou Singh Thingujam, 17 years and 47 days (against NorthEast United, 20 January 2024)
- Oldest first-team player: David James, 44 years and 139 days (against Atlético de Kolkata, 20 December 2014)

=== Most appearances ===
Bold denotes players currently playing for the club.

Most appearances for Kerala Blasters FC
Rank	Player	Years	ISL	Super Cup	Durand Cup	Total
1	(India) Sahal Abdul Samad	2017–2023	92	4	1	97
2	(Uruguay) **Adrián Luna**	2021–	78	4	8	90
2	(India) **Hormipam Ruivah**	2021–	77	6	7	90
4	(India) Rahul KP	2019–2025	81	3	5	89
5	(India) **Sandeep Singh**	2020–	79	6	3	88
6	(India) Jeakson Singh	2018–2024	78	3	5	86
7	(India) Sandesh Jhingan	2014–2020	76	2	0	78
8	(India) Danish Farooq	2023–2026	56	11	6	73
8	(India) **Vibin Mohanan**	2022–	60	6	7	73
10	(India) Jessel Carneiro	2019–2023	63	0	3	66
10	(India) Prasanth K	2016–2022	61	2	3	66

=== Goalscorers ===
- Most goals in all competitions: 28, Dimitrios Diamantakos
- Most league goals: 23, Dimitrios Diamantakos
- Most goals in Super Cup: 5, Dimitrios Diamantakos
- Most goals in Durand Cup: 7, Mohammed Aimen (Note: Including 3 goals with the reserve team in the 2022 Durand Cup)
- First player to score for Kerala Blasters: Iain Hume (against Chennaiyin, 21 October 2014)
- First Indian player to score for Kerala Blasters: C. S. Sabeeth (against Pune City, 30 October 2014)
- First goal in home ground: Milagres Gonsalves (against Goa, 6 November 2014)
- First goalscorer in Super Cup: Pulga (against NEROCA, 5 April 2018)
- First Indian goalscorer in Super Cup: Prasanth Karuthadathkuni (against NEROCA, 5 April 2018)
- First goalscorer in Durand Cup: Adrián Luna (against Indian Navy, 11 September 2021)
- First Indian goalscorer in Durand Cup: Prabir Das (against Gokulam Kerala, 13 August 2023) (Note: matches played by the reserve team in the 2022 Durand Cup not are not taken into consideration)
- Most goals in a season in league: 15, Bartholomew Ogbeche (2019–20)
- Most goals in a season in all competitions: 16, Dimitrios Diamantakos (2023–24)
- Most goals in a league match: 3
  - Iain Hume (against Delhi Dynamos, 10 January 2018)
  - Bartholomew Ogbeche (against Chennaiyin, 1 February 2020)
- Most goals in a Durand Cup match: 3
  - Bidyashagar Singh (against Indian Air Force, 21 August 2023)
  - Kwame Peprah (against Mumbai City, 1 August 2024)
  - Noah Sadaoui (against CISF, 10 August 2024)
- First hat-trick (also in league): Iain Hume (against Delhi Dynamos, 10 January 2018)
- First Indian hat-trick scorer (also the first ever hat-trick in Durand cup): Bidyashaghar Singh (against Indian Air Force, 21 August 2023)
- Youngest Indian goalscorer in league: Korou Singh Thingujam, 18 years and 27 days
- Youngest foreign goalscorer in league: Mark Sifneos, 21 years and 9 days
- Youngest Indian goalscorer in Durand Cup: Mohammed Aimen: 20 years and 208 days (Note: matches played with the reserve team in the 2022 Durand Cup not are not taken into consideration)
- Youngest foreign goalscorer in Durand Cup: Justine Emmanuel, 20 years and 122 days
- Oldest goalscorer in league: Wes Brown, 38 years and 127 days
- Fastest goal scored in a match: 29 seconds, Chris Dagnall (against NorthEast United, 15 November 2015)

=== Top goalscorers ===
Competitive matches only. Matches played (including as a substitute) appear in brackets.

Bold denotes players currently playing for the club.

Top goalscorers for Kerala Blasters FC
Rank	Player	Years	ISL	Super Cup	Durand Cup	Total	Goal Ratio
1	(Greece) Dimitrios Diamantakos	2022–2024	23 (38)	5(6)	0 (0)	**28** (44)	0.64
2	(Nigeria) Bartholomew Ogbeche	2019–2020	15 (16)	0 (0)	0 (0)	**15** (16)	0.94
2	(Uruguay) **Adrián Luna**	2021–	13 (78)	0 (4)	2 (8)	**15** (90)	0.17
4	(Morocco) Noah Sadaoui	2024–2026	7 (19)	1 (5)	6 (4)	**14** (28)	0.58
4	(Ghana) Kwame Peprah	2023–2025	8 (34)	2 (2)	4 (4)	**14** (40)	0.35
6	(Spain) Jesús Jiménez	2024–2025	11 (16)	1 (1)	0 (0)	**12** (17)	0.71
7	(India) C. K. Vineeth	2015–2019	11 (42)	0 (1)	0 (0)	**11** (43)	0.26
8	(Canada) Iain Hume	2014–2018	10 (29)	0 (0)	0 (0)	**10** (29)	0.34
8	(India) Sahal Abdul Samad	2017–2023	10 (92)	0 (4)	0 (1)	**10** (97)	0.10
10	(India) Mohammed Aimen	2022–2025	1 (31)	1 (7)	7 (12)	**9** (50)	0.18
10	(India) Rahul KP	2019–2025	8 (78)	1 (3)	0 (5)	**9** (86)	0.10

=== Hat-tricks ===
Bold denotes players currently playing for the club.

Hat-trick goal-scorers for Kerala Blasters FC
Player	Against	Final score	Venue and competition	Date	Ref.
(Canada) Iain Hume	Delhi Dynamos	3–1 (A)	Jawaharlal Nehru Stadium, Delhi (Indian Super League)	10 January 2018 (2017–18)	
(Nigeria) Bartholomew Ogbeche	Chennaiyin	3–6 (H)	Jawaharlal Nehru Stadium, Kochi (Indian Super League)	1 February 2020 (2019–20)	
(India) Bidyashagar Singh	Indian Airforce FT	5-0 (N)	Kishore Bharati Krirangan, Kolkata (Durand Cup)	21 August 2023 (2023–24)	
(Ghana) Kwame Peprah	Mumbai City	0–8 (N)	Kishore Bharati Krirangan, Kolkata (Durand Cup)	1 August 2024 (2024–25)	
(Morocco) Noah Sadaoui	Mumbai City	0–8 (N)	Kishore Bharati Krirangan, Kolkata (Durand Cup)	1 August 2024 (2024–25)	
(Morocco) Noah Sadaoui	CISF Protectors	7–0 (N)	Salt Lake Stadium, Kolkata (Durand Cup)	10 August 2024 (2024–25)	

- First hat-trick (also in league): Iain Hume (against Delhi Dynamos, 10 January 2018)
- First hat-trick by Indian (also the first ever hat-trick in Durand cup): Bidyashaghar Singh (against Indian Air Force, 21 August 2023)

=== Assists ===
- Most assists in all competitions: 28, Adrián Luna
- First assist: Milagres Gonsalves (against ATK, 26 October 2014)
- Most assists in a season: 7, Adrián Luna (2021–22)
- Youngest assist provider in the league: Korou Singh, 17 years, 11 months and 9 days

Competitive matches only. Matches played (including as a substitute) appear in brackets.

Bold denotes players currently playing for the club.

Most assists for Kerala Blasters FC
Rank	Player	Years	League	Cup	Other (Note: The "Other" column includes goals and appearances from Durand Cup)	Total
1	(Uruguay) **Adrián Luna**	2021–	24 (78)	1 (4)	3 (8)	**28** (90)
2	(India) Sahal Abdul Samad	2017–2023	8 (92)	1 (4)	0 (1)	**9** (97)
2	(India) Mohammed Aimen	2022–2025	5 (31)	0 (7)	4 (12)	**9** (50)
4	(Morocco) Noah Sadoui	2024–	5 (19)	0 (5)	2 (4)	**7** (28)
4	(Greece) Dimitrios Diamantakos	2022–2024	6 (38)	1 (6)	0 (0)	**7** (44)
6	(India) Vibin Mohanan	2022–	2 (60)	0 (6)	4(7)	**6** (73)
6	(Spain) Josué Currais Prieto	2015–2016	6 (25)	0 (0)	0 (0)	**6** (25)
6	(India) Jessel Carneiro	2019–2023	6 (60)	0 (0)	0 (3)	**6** (63)
9	(India) Korou Singh	2024–	5 (25)	0 (4)	0 (0)	**5** (29)
9	(India) **Ebindas Yesudasan**	2025–	5 (14)	0 (1)	0 (4)	**5** (19)
9	(Grenada) Antonio German	2015–2017	5 (23)	0 (0)	0 (0)	**5** (23)
9	(Ghana) Courage Pekuson	2017–2019	5 (30)	0 (0)	0 (0)	**5** (30)
9	(Ghana) Kwame Peprah	2023–2025	1 (30)	0 (2)	4 (4)	**5** (36)
9	(India) Danish Farooq Bhat	2023–	1 (56)	1 (11)	3 (6)	**5** (73)8
9	(India) Rahul KP	2019–2025	5 (81)	0 (3)	0 (5)	**5** (89)

=== Clean sheets ===
- Most clean sheets in all competitions: 13, Sachin Suresh
- Most clean sheets in League Matches: 11, Prabhsukhan Singh Gill
- First clean sheet: David James (against Goa, 6 November 2014)
- Most clean sheets in a season: 7, Prabhsukhan Singh Gill (2021–22)

Competitive matches only. Matches played (including as a substitute) appear in brackets.

Bold denotes players currently playing for the club.

Most clean sheets for Kerala Blasters FC
Rank	Player	Years	League	Cup	Other	Total
1	(India) Sachin Suresh	2021–2026	9 (32)	1 (8)	3 (9)	**13** (49)
2	(India) Prabhsukhan Singh Gill	2020–2023	11 (39)	0 (0)	0 (1)	**11** (40)
3	(India) Sandip Nandy	2014–2016	8 (18)	0 (0)	0 (0)	**8** (18)
4	(India) Albino Gomes	2020–2022	5 (24)	0 (0)	1 (2)	**6** (26)
5	(England) David James	2014	5 (12)	0 (0)	0 (0)	**5** (12)
5	(England) Paul Rachubka	2017–2018	5 (12)	0 (1)	0 (0)	**5** (13)
7	(India) Nora Fernandes	2024–2026	1 (2)	2 (0)	1 (1)	**4** (7)
7	(India) Dheeraj Singh	2018–2019	4 (13)	0 (1)	0 (0)	**4** (14)
9	(India) **Amrinder Singh**	2026–	2 (2)	0 (0)	0 (0)	**2** (2)
9	(India) Som Kumar	2024–2025	0 (4)	0 (0)	2 (4)	**2** (8)
9	(England) Stephen Bywater	2015	2 (12)	0 (0)	0 (0)	**2** (12)
9	(India) Rehenesh TP	2019–2020	2 (13)	0 (0)	0 (0)	**2** (13)
9	(India) **Arsh Anwer Shaikh**	2025–	2 (14)	0 (0)	0 (0)	**2** (14)

=== Miscellaneous records ===
- Most penalty saves in an Indian Super League season: 3, Albino Gomes (2020–21)
- First Indian goalkeeper to assist in the Indian Super League: Albino Gomes (for Jordan Murray against East Bengal, 15 January 2021)
- Longest goal in the Indian Super League: 59 meters, Álvaro Vázquez (against NorthEast United, 4 February 2022)

=== Indian Super League ===
- Indian Super League Golden Ball:
  - (Canada) Iain Hume (2014)
- Indian Super League Golden Boot:
  - (Greece) Dimitrios Diamantakos (2023–24)
- Indian Super League Golden Glove:
  - (India) Prabhsukhan Singh Gill (2021–22)
- Indian Super League Emerging Player of the League (3):
  - (India) Sandesh Jhingan (2014)
  - (India) Lalruatthara (2017–18)
  - (India) Sahal Abdul Samad (2018–19)

=== Durand Cup ===
- Durand Cup Golden Boot:
  - (Morocco) Noah Sadaoui (2024)

== Managerial records ==
=== Managers ===
As of 25 October 2026

- First manager: David James, from 13 August 2014 to 20 December 2014
- Longest-serving manager: Ivan Vukomanović, 2 years, 314 days (from 17 June 2021 to 26 April 2024)
- Shortest tenure as manager by time (excluding caretakers): Terry Phelan, 49 days (from 1 November to 20 December 2015)
- Shortest tenure as a manager by matches (excluding caretakers): Peter Taylor, 6 matches (from 12 May to 28 October 2015)
- Most matches managed: 76, Ivan Vukomanović
- Most matches won as manager: 33, Ivan Vukomanović
- Most matches drawn as manager: 14, Ivan Vukomanović
- Most matches lost as manager: 29, Ivan Vukomanović
- Highest win percentage: 54.55%, Ashley Westwood
- Lowest win percentage (excluding caretakers): 14.29%, René Meulensteen

== See also ==
- Kerala Blasters FC
- List of Kerala Blasters FC players
- List of Indian Super League records and statistics
- Kerala Blasters FC results by opponent
- List of Kerala Blasters FC seasons
- List of Kerala Blasters FC managers
