= List of Kerala Blasters FC managers =

Kerala Blasters Football Club is an Indian professional football club based in Kochi, Kerala. Established on 27 May 2014, the club competes in the Indian Super League, the top-tier of Indian football. David James served as a player-manager during the club's inaugural season in the 2014 Indian Super League, while Peter Taylor became the club's first full-time manager. Ivan Vukomanović holds the record for managing the most matches for the club.

== Managerial history ==
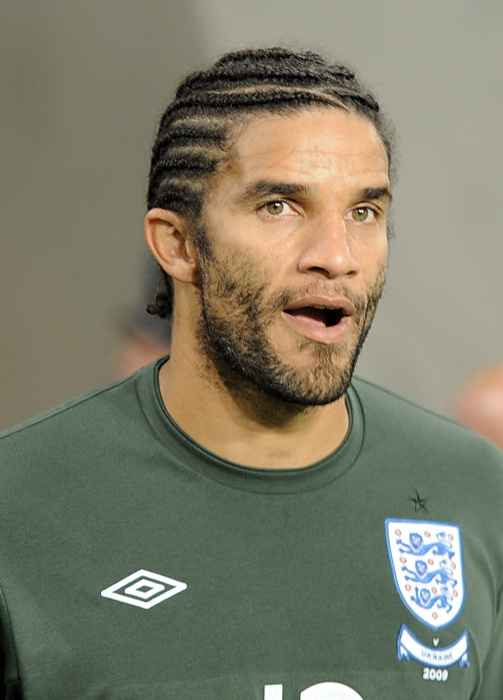
David James is the first manager and marquee player of the club

The club is currently managed by Ashley Westwood who took over the role in 27 March 2026. The club's longest-serving manager, in terms of both length of tenure and number of games was Ivan Vukomanović, who departed the club on 26 April 2024 after three seasons in the ISL.

=== 2014 season ===
On 13 August 2014, former England international goalkeeper, David James, was announced as the first head coach of the Blasters and the first marquee player in team history, thus coming in as a player-head coach. The Blasters finished at 4th position and qualified for semifinal. The Blasters won the first leg at home 3–0. During the second leg in Chennai, the Blasters suffered a massive scare. Despite entering the second leg with the three goal advantage, Chennaiyin managed to draw the tie level by winning in regular time 3–0 themselves. However, in extra-time, the Blasters managed to strike back and score the decisive goal in the 117th minute from Stephen Pearson to win the tie 4–3 and thus enter the final.

In the final, the Blasters took on Atlético de Kolkata at the DY Patil Stadium in Mumbai. Despite holding on for ninety minutes, it was Atlético de Kolkata that came out on top with a Mohammed Rafique goal in the 95th minute earning the Kolkata side the title with a 1–0 victory.

=== 2015 season ===
After the 2014 season, it was announced that David James would not return to the club as head coach and marquee player. On 12 May 2015 it was announced that former England U20 head coach Peter Taylor would take over as the Blasters head coach.

The first match of the season was played at the Jawaharlal Nehru Stadium, with the Blasters hosting NorthEast United. However, the Blasters followed that victory drawing their next match against Mumbai City and then losing their next four matches which eventually led to the dismissal of Peter Taylor as head coach. Assistant coach Trevor Morgan was in charge for one match before Terry Phelan was named head coach for the rest of the season. Fortunes failed to change for the Kerala Blasters as the club ended their second season in last place, failing to qualify for the Indian Super League finals.

=== 2016 season ===
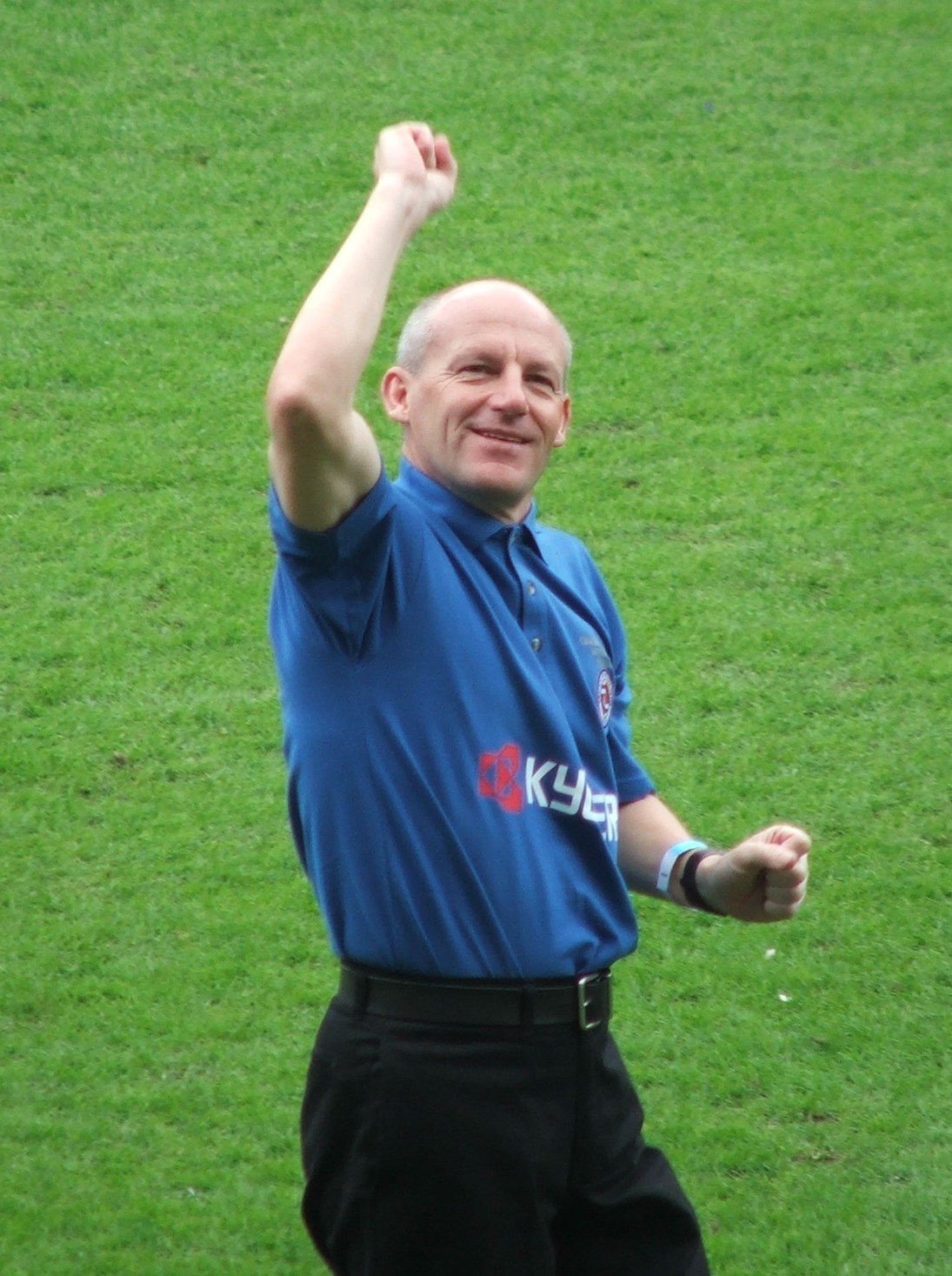
Steve Coppell is one of the most popular head coach of the Blasters

On 21 June 2016 Blasters announced the signing of former Crystal Palace manager Steve Coppell as their head coach. After the first month of the season, the Blasters had one of the best defenses statistically in the league but struggled to find the back of the net. In the second half of the season, after the return of C.K. Vineeth from loan with Bengaluru FC, the Blasters managed to surge their way into the finals.

In the final, the Kerala Blasters would play host to Atlético de Kolkata.The match went into a penalty shootout, Despite taking the lead early in the shootout, the Blasters lost 4–3 and thus were defeated in their second final in three seasons.

=== 2017–18 season ===
On 14 July 2017, René Meulensteen was appointed as head coach of Kerala Blasters. Dimitar Berbatov signed with Blasters on 23 August 2017 on a one-year deal for a salary of ₹7.5 crore (approximately £900,000). On 2 January 2018, René Meulensteen step back from head coach position due to personal issues. David James was signed on 3 January 2018, for the rest of the season. Kerala Blasters finished at 6th position on the table and did not qualify for playoffs.

=== 2018–19 season ===
Blasters signed a three-and-a-half-year agreement with David James. But was sacked due to poor performance, discontinued from 18 December 2018. Former NEUFC head coach Nelo Vingada was signed for the rest of the season. The Blasters finished at 9th position on the table with only 2 wins from 18 games and did not qualify for playoffs.

=== 2019–20 season ===
Blasters brought in Dutchman Eelco Schattorie as their new manager with a long term. Having previously coached other Indian clubs like East Bengal, United S.C and Northeast United. Blasters started the season with a win against ATK FC at home but then had a 9 winless run and inconsistent performance along with injury issues. At the end, the Blasters finished the season at 7th position with only 4 wins in 18 matches.

=== 2020–21 season ===
On 2020 April, the Blasters announced that Kibu Vicuña has been appointed as their manager for the 2020-21 season. After 18 games under Kibu, the Blasters only had 16 points losing which eventually led to the dismissal of Kibu vicuna as head coach. Assistant coach Ishfaq Ahmed was in charge for the last two matches of the season. They finished in 10th place in the table.

=== 2021–22 season ===
On 17 June 2021, Ivan Vukomanović was appointed as the head coach of Kerala Blasters. Under Vukomanović, on 11 September 2021, Kerala Blasters won their first game of the season in the 2021 Durand Cup match against Indian Navy with a score of 0–3 at full-time. Vukomanović's first Indian Super League match as the Blasters' manager ended in 4–2 defeat against ATK Mohun Bagan on 19 November. The following two games saw Blasters drawing against NorthEast United FC and Bengaluru FC respectively. It was on 5 December that Vukomanović's Blasters side saw their first league win as they defeated Odisha FC by 2–1. This victory was Kerala Blasters' first Indian Super League victory in 11 months. The Blasters' winning streak continued as they won back-to-back games against defending champions Mumbai City FC, and against rivals Chennaiyin FC, and thereby entering the top four in the table. The Blasters extended their unbeaten steak under Vukomanović to ten, when they won back-to-back games against Hyderabad FC on 9 January 2022, and against Odisha three days later, which helped the Blasters to move to the first spot in table after a long time of 7 years during the middle of the season. The Blasters unbeaten streak of ten match under Vukomanović ended with their 0–1 defeat over the arch-rivals Bengaluru on 30 January 2022. On 5 March, Blasters side qualified for the playoffs for the first time since 2016. With the end of the regular phase of the season, Vukomanović's Blasters side broke many club records in terms of number of wins, goals, clean-sheets, points-per-game, and achieved a positive goal difference for the first time in the club's history. Under Vukomanović, the club qualified for the finals of the ISL for the first time in 6 years after defeating Jamshedur FC on an aggregate score of 2–1 from both legs. Kerala Blasters played Hyderabad in the final on 20 March, which they lost in the penalty shoot-out after the allotted extra time went goalless, as both sides ended the match 1–1 at 120 minutes.

=== 2022–23 season ===
On 4 April 2022, the Blasters renewed the contract of the head coach Ivan Vukomanović till 2025, which was the first time the club has renewed the contract of a first-team head coach in its history. The Blasters played their first match of the season under the management of Vukomanović in the opening match of the 2022–23 Indian Super League season on 7 October against East Bengal FC, which they won 3–1. Under Vukomanović's guidance, the Blasters went on an eight match unbeaten-streak and also achieved a five consecutive wins in the league stage for the first time in their history in this season. Vukomanović's Blasters also set a new club record of most number of wins in the league stage by winning ten games out of twenty matches at the end of the season, and ended up 5th in the table and qualified for the playoffs. The Blasters met arch-rivals Bengaluru FC in the first knockout stage match in a new format for the ISL playoffs. Following a controversial Sunil Chhetri's free-kick goal on the match that took place on 3 March 2023, Vukomanović called-off the Kerala Blasters players from the pitch and abandoned the game. Bengaluru was awarded the win, and the Blasters appealed to the federation for the match to be replayed and demanded for the match referee Crystal John to banned from refereeing. As a consequence of calling-off the players and abandoning the match, Vukomanović was handed a ten-match ban by the All India Football Federation's disciplinary committee from taking part in any AIFF held tournaments along with a fine of rupees five lakhs, and directed him to issue a public apology within a week of issuing the verdict, failing which the fine would be doubled to rupees ten lakhs. Vukomanović issued his apologies as per the verdict of the AIFF-DC, thereby giving an end to a dramatic ISL season. Following the ban of Vukomanović, the assistant coach Frank Dauwen took charge of the club and managed the club in the 2023 Indian Super Cup.

=== 2023–24 season ===
Following the 10-match ban imposed on Vukomanović by the AIFF-DC as a result of the walk-out incident in the previous season, Vukomanović missed-out the entire 2023 Durand Cup tournament. After being absent for the entirety of the Durand Cup, and missing out on the opening four matches of the 2023–24 Indian Super League matches, Vukomanović made his return to the dug-out on 27 October 2023 against Odisha FC, where he was welcomed with a tifo in the stands, as the Blasters won the match 2–1 with a comeback win. On 27 December, the Blasters met Mohun Bagan Super Giant away from home, and an early strike by Dimitrios Diamantakos helped the Vukomanović's men to record their first win in their history over Mohun Bagan, as well as their first win ever against a side managed by the Spaniard Juan Ferrando. This win over Mohun Bagan also made Vukomanović the first Blasters manager to guide the team to a three consecutive clean-sheets, as well as he became the first Blasters manager to defeat all the sides in the Indian Super League. The Blasters would have a roller-coaster season, as the Vukomanović's side won eight out of the first twelve matches, as they ended the first half of the season as table-toppers before going into the winter-breaks. Coming from the winter-breaks, the Blasters played the 2024 Indian Super Cup in January 2024, but was subsequently disqualified after securing just three points in three games from group stage matches. Coupled with dozens of injuries at the club, along with dozens of suspensions, the Vukomanović's side had a difficult second half of the league campaign as they won only two out of the rest of the ten league matches. They finished the regular season with 33 points and ended up 5th in the table, as the Blasters qualified for the league playoffs for the third consecutive time, an accomplishment which was unprecedented in the club's history. Vukomanović also became the first Blasters manager to take the side to the playoffs for three times in their history, as well as the first ever manager in the league to do it three seasons in a row, before losing out to Odisha FC in the knockout play-offs in extra-time, marking an end to the Blasters' 2023–24 season. Despite the impressive performance and the contract renewed till 2025, Vukomanović parted ways with club officially in April 2024.

=== 2024–25 season ===
In May 2024, Mikael Stahre was appointed as the new head-coach for the season, with contract signed till 2026. The club started season with the Durand Cup match against Mumbai City FC, winning in a huge score of 8–0, the club's highest win by far. They continued their journey in the Durand Cup and was qualified for the semi-finals, where they lost to Bengaluru FC for 1-0 and got eliminated from the tournament.

The club started its ISL journey with a home loss against Punjab FC for 2–1. After 12 matches, the club only managed three wins. Due to the poor performance, the management announced the departure of Mikael Stahre on 16 December 2024.

== List and statistics ==
As of 31 October 2026

Only competitive matches played by first team are taken into account. Durand cup matches played by the reserve team are not taken into account.

Table headers

- P – The number of games managed for Kerala Blasters.
- W – The number of games won as a manager.
- D – The number of games draw as a manager.
- L – The number of games lost as a manager.
- GF – The number of goals scored under his management.
- GA – The number of goals conceded under his management.
- Win% – The total winning percentage under his management.

List of Kerala Blasters FC head coaches
Name	Nationality	From	To	P	W	D	L	GF	GA	Win%
David James	England	13 August 2014	20 December 2014	17	6	4	7	13	15	35.29
Peter Taylor	England	12 May 2015	28 October 2015	6	1	1	4	7	9	16.67
Trevor Morgan (caretaker)	England	28 October 2015	1 November 2015	1	0	1	0	1	1	0.00
Terry Phelan	Ireland	1 November 2015	20 December 2015	7	2	2	3	14	17	28.57
Steve Coppell	England	21 June 2016	12 July 2017	17	7	4	6	15	17	41.18
René Meulensteen	Netherlands	14 July 2017	2 January 2018	7	1	4	2	6	10	14.29
David James	England	3 January 2018	18 December 2018	24	6	9	9	26	22	25.00
Nelo Vingada (interim)	Portugal	18 January 2019	17 March 2019	7	1	3	3	6	10	14.29
Eelco Schattorie	Netherlands	19 May 2019	22 April 2020	18	4	7	7	29	33	22.22
Kibu Vicuna	Spain	22 April 2020	17 February 2021	18	3	7	8	22	33	16.67
Ishfaq Ahmed (interim)	India	17 February 2021	27 February 2021	2	0	1	1	1	3	0.00
Ivan Vukomanović	Serbia	17 June 2021	26 April 2024	76	33	14	29	115	105	43.42
Frank Dauwen (stand-in) (Note: When AIFF imposed a 10 match ban on Ivan Vukomanović from AIFF held tournaments, assistant coach Frank Dauwen was in charge of the team for the 2023 Indian Super Cup.)	Belgium	5 April 2023	16 April 2023	3	1	1	1	4	4	33.33
Mikael Stahre	Sweden	23 May 2024	16 December 2024	16	5	3	8	35	26	31.25
T. G. Purushothaman (caretaker) (Note: When Mikael Stahre was sacked, Tomasz Tchórz and Purushothaman joinly managed the first team. Purushothaman was registered as the head coach while Tchórz became the de facto head coach.)	India	17 December 2024	24 March 2025	12	5	3	4	14	13	41.67
David Català	Spain	25 March 2025	27 March 2026	9	2	1	6	7	11	22.22
Ashley Westwood	England	27 March 2026	Present	11	6	3	2	15	11	54.55

== Assistant managers ==
The following is a list of all the persons who worked as an Assistant Manager for the club.

- (England) Trevor Morgan (2014–2015)
- (Scotland) Jamie McAllister (2014)
- (India) Ishfaq Ahmed (2015–2017), (2019–2023)
- (England) Wally Downes (2016–2017)
- (Netherlands) Wim Suurbier (2017)
- (England) Iain Shaw (2017)
- (India) Thangboi Singto (2017–2019)
- (Iceland) Hermann Hreidarsson (2017–2018)
- (Portugal) João Arnaldo Correia de Carvalho (2019)
- (India) Francisco Bruto Da Costa (2019)
- (Australia) Shaun Ontong (2019–2020)
- (India) Shameel Chembakath (2020)
- (Venezuela) Guillermo Sanchez (2020)
- (Poland) Tomasz Tchórz (2020–2021)
- (Belgium) Patrick Van Kets (2021)
- (Belgium) Stéphane van der Heyden (2021–2022)
- (Belgium) Frank Dauwen (2022–2024)
- (India) T. G. Purushothaman (2023–2025)
- (Sweden) Björn Wesström (2024)
- (Portugal) Frederico Pereira Morais (2024)
- (India) Chinta Chandrashekar Rao(2026)
- (England) Peter Hartley (2026)
- (India) Amit Rana (2026–)
- (England) Hasney Aljofree (2026–)

== See also ==
- Kerala Blasters
- Kerala Blasters FC Reserves and Academy
- List of Kerala Blasters FC players
- List of Kerala Blasters FC records and statistics
- List of Kerala Blasters FC Seasons
- Kerala Blasters FC results by opponent
