= Bader Al-Khamees =

Saudi Arabian footballer

Bader Al-Khames
Personal information
- Full name: Bader Adel Al-Khames
- Date of birth: August 4, 1984 (age 42)
- Place of birth: Dammam, Saudi Arabia
- Height: 1.80 m (5 ft 11 in)
- Position: Striker

Team information
- Current team: Al-Thoqbah
- Number: 9

Youth career
- Al-Ettifaq FC

Senior career*
Years	Team	Apps	(Gls)
2003–2010	Al-Ettifaq FC		
2008	→ Sdoos (loan)	7	(1)
2009–2010	→ Al-Taawoun (loan)	4	(0)
2010–2012	Al-Taawoun	52	(29)
2012–2013	Al-Ahli	9	(0)
2013–2014	Al-Fateh	21	(3)
2014–2016	Al-Taawoun	24	(3)
2016–2018	Al-Nahda		
2018–2019	Al-Safa		
2019	Al-Shoulla		
2019–2020	Al-Thoqbah		
2020–2021	Al-Arabi		
2021–2022	Al-Thoqbah		
2023–2024	Al-Hada		
2024–	Al-Thoqbah		

International career
2011	Saudi Arabia	5	(2)
- * Club domestic league appearances and goals

Bader Al-Khames (Arabic: بدر الخميس; born 4 August 1984) is a Saudi Arabian football player who plays for Al-Thoqbah as a striker.

== International Goals ==
#	Date	Venue	Opponent	Score	Result	Competition
1	October 13, 2011	Bahrain	United Arab Emirates	1–1	Draw	2011 GCC Games
2	October 22, 2011	Bahrain	Bahrain	1–3	Loss	2011 GCC Games (Final)
