= Peter Taylor (footballer, born 1953) =

English footballer and football manager (born 1953)

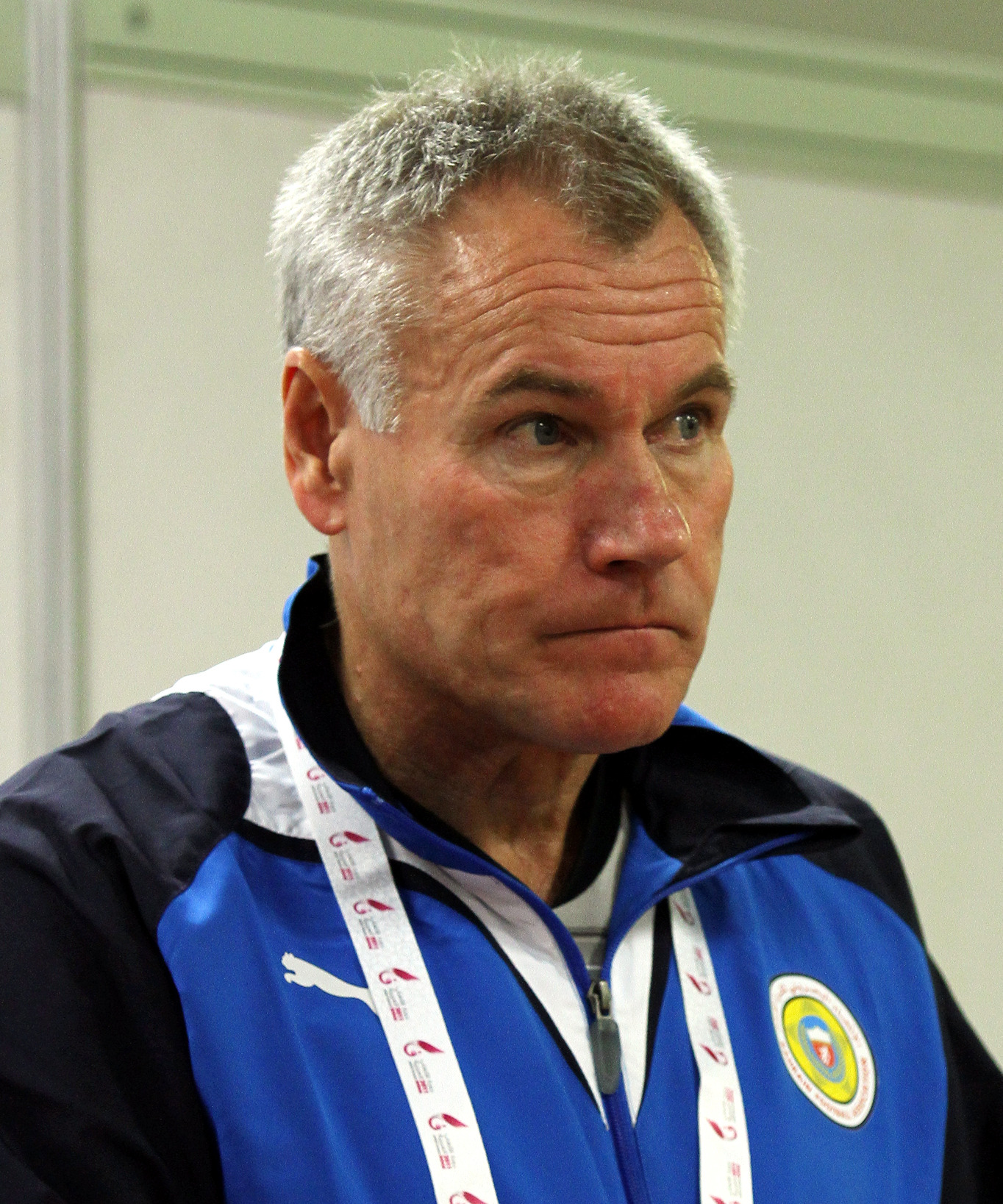
- Taylor at the 2011 Pan Arab Games

Personal information
- Full name: Peter John Taylor
- Date of birth: 3 January 1953 (age 73)
- Place of birth: Rochford, England
- Position: Winger

Team information
- Current team: Thailand (assistant)

Youth career
- –1969: Canvey Island
- 1969–1971: Southend United

Senior career*
Years	Team	Apps	(Gls)
1971–1973	Southend United	75	(12)
1973–1976	Crystal Palace	122	(33)
1976–1980	Tottenham Hotspur	123	(31)
1980–1983	Leyton Orient	56	(11)
1983	→ Oldham Athletic (loan)	4	(0)
1983–1984	Exeter City	8	(0)
1984–1985	Maidstone United	20	(2)
1985	Heybridge Swifts		
1985–1986	Chelmsford City	56	(16)
1986–1990	Dartford	253	(94)
1990–1991	Enfield		
1995	Chelmsford City	3	(0)
Total		470	(105)

International career
1974–1975	England U23	4	(4)
1976	England	4	(2)
1984	England C	3	(0)

Managerial career
- 1986–1990: Dartford
- 1990–1991: Enfield
- 1993–1995: Southend United
- 1995–1996: Dover Athletic
- 1996–1999: England U21
- 1999–2000: Gillingham
- 2000–2001: Leicester City
- 2000: England (caretaker)
- 2001–2002: Brighton & Hove Albion
- 2002–2006: Hull City
- 2004–2007: England U21
- 2006–2007: Crystal Palace
- 2007–2008: Stevenage Borough
- 2008–2009: Wycombe Wanderers
- 2010–2011: Bradford City
- 2011–2012: Bahrain
- 2013: England U20
- 2013–2014: Gillingham
- 2015: Kerala Blasters
- 2017: Gillingham (caretaker)
- 2018–2019: Dagenham & Redbridge
- 2021–2022: Welling United
- 2022–2023: Maldon & Tiptree
- 2025: Canvey Island
- * Club domestic league appearances and goals

Peter John Taylor (born 3 January 1953) is an English professional football manager and former player who is the assistant coach of the Thailand national team.

During his time as a player with Crystal Palace during the 1970s, Taylor became one of the few players to have been selected for the senior England national team when not playing in the top two flights of a domestic league.

He was previously manager at Dartford, Enfield, Southend United, Dover Athletic, Leicester City, Brighton and Hove Albion, Hull City, Crystal Palace, Kerala Blasters, Stevenage Borough, Wycombe Wanderers, Bradford City and (twice) Gillingham, Maldon & Tiptree.

He also had two spells as head coach of the England under-21 team and took charge of the senior England national team as caretaker manager for one game against Italy, for which he made David Beckham captain of England for the first time. He managed the England under-20 team in 2013. Outside England, Taylor was the head coach of the Bahrain national team.

== Playing career ==
Taylor enjoyed a successful playing career as a winger. He began his youth career with Canvey Island, and had trials at Tottenham Hotspur and Crystal Palace before signing as a junior with Southend United in 1971. Southend gained promotion to the Third Division in 1972 and Taylor's part in their success brought him to the attention of Crystal Palace manager, Malcolm Allison, who signed him on 11 October 1973 for £110,000. Palace were relegated to the third tier at the end of that season, but Taylor was named Player of the Year and remained at the club for two further seasons, becoming player of the year again in 1976. The 1975–76 season was a high point in Taylor's career as Palace reached the FA Cup semi-final, Taylor scoring two goals in the fifth round in a 3–2 away win at Chelsea and he also made four appearances for the full England team, scoring twice. However, Palace's season tailed off after the semi-final and they did not achieve promotion to the second tier. At the end of the season Allison resigned and was replaced by Terry Venables, and on 30 September 1976 Taylor was allowed to depart for top-flight Tottenham Hotspur for a fee of £400,000.

Taylor scored on his debut in a 4–2 defeat at The Hawthorns to West Bromwich Albion. He had a mixed career at Spurs; the club suffered relegation in 1977 but was promoted in 1978. Taylor did not make another England appearance and in 1980 moved on to Leyton Orient, having made 123 appearances for Tottenham during which he scored 31 times. He played 56 times for Orient, scoring eleven times in three seasons, and had a brief loan spell at Oldham Athletic. In 1983–84 Taylor made eight appearances for Exeter City before moving into non-league football with firstly Maidstone United, and then Chelmsford City, Dartford and Enfield.

Taylor made his England debut as a substitute versus Wales and scored the winning goal in the 80th minute of that game. He scored his second international goal against the same opponents in the next match that he played. Taylor was the last English footballer to score two goals in his first two international games before Rickie Lambert repeated the feat in 2013.

After his playing career ended, Taylor embarked on a career as a coach and manager.

== Management career ==
=== Early management ===
Taylor became player manager at non-league club Dartford. In his four seasons the club finished 4th, 2nd (on goal difference), 2nd and 3rd in the Southern League Premier Division. Reached two FA Trophy semi finals, won the Southern League Cup twice and beaten finalists on a further occasion plus two Kent Senior Cup wins. During this period attendances rose from 400 to around 1,000 and each season he was there Dartford scored more than 100 goals. He made 253 appearances as player-manager for Dartford between 1986-1990 scoring 94 goals.

Taylor's first managerial role in the Football League was at Southend United. He spent two years between 1993 and 1995 as manager but quit at the end of the 1994–95 season after failing to get them beyond the middle of the Division One table. Taylor took on the job as manager of Conference club Dover Athletic in 1995–96 season and guided the club to 20th, enough to stave off the threat of relegation as only two clubs were relegated that season.

=== England U-21 ===
He agreed and signed a two-year contract at Dover in May 1996 but was to leave the club only two months later after being asked by then England boss Glenn Hoddle to manage the England under-21 side. His record (for competitive matches) was eleven wins, three draws and one defeat from fifteen games. In this time, England finished ninth in 1998 European Championship and qualified for the 2000 finals comfortably, winning every match without conceding a goal. But with three matches to play, Taylor was replaced in a controversial manner by Howard Wilkinson, who won the next two matches. The three goals conceded in the 3–1 defeat to group runners-up Poland were the only blemish on the team's qualifying record. England under Wilkinson later got knocked out in the group stage of the finals, winning against Turkey but losing to Slovakia and champions Italy.

=== Gillingham ===
Taylor returned to club management at the beginning of the 1999–2000 season with Gillingham, and at the end of the season guided them to victory over Wigan Athletic in the Division Two play-off final which marked the Kent club's promotion to the upper half of the English league for the first time in their history. During this season he also guided the Gills to the quarterfinals of the FA Cup after impressive wins over Premiership opposition in Bradford City and Sheffield Wednesday (a brace of 3–1 home wins), before losing 5–0 away to Chelsea in the last eight.

=== Leicester City ===
A few weeks later he left the club to take charge at Leicester City in the Premier League. He had an excellent start at the East Midlands club and they went top of the league on 1 October 2000. They stayed at the top of the league for two weeks (Taylor having been voted Premier League Manager of the Month for September 2000) and were in contention for a UEFA Cup place for well over half a season, but nine defeats from their final ten games sucked them down to 13th place in the wake of a shock defeat by Wycombe Wanderers in the FA Cup quarter-final.

After a terrible start to the 2001–02 season, Taylor was sacked on 30 September 2001.

==== England ====
In November 2000, whilst managing Leicester, Taylor was appointed caretaker manager of England for one match. For that game, a 1–0 defeat by Italy in the Stadio Delle Alpi in Turin on 15 November 2000, Taylor looked to youth. He handed David Beckham the captain's armband for the first time and used six players then still eligible for the Under-21s: Gareth Barry, Jamie Carragher, Kieron Dyer, Rio Ferdinand, Emile Heskey and Seth Johnson.

=== Brighton and Hove Albion ===
After being sacked by Leicester, he returned to management within two weeks to take charge at Brighton & Hove Albion whose previous manager Micky Adams had become the new assistant manager of Leicester City. Taylor guided Brighton to the Division Two championship (marking their return to the upper half of the English league after eleven years) but resigned from his job at the end of the season, citing a low budget and the delay to the new stadium.

=== Hull City ===
In November 2002 Taylor was appointed manager of Hull City who were weeks away from their move to the 25,404-seat KC Stadium. A mid-table finish was followed in 2003–04 by promotion as Division Three runners-up. They finished League One runners-up the following season, 2004–05, and thus reached the Football League Championship in the 2005–06 season – their first appearance at that level since 1990–91, and they finished 18th in the league.

=== England U-21 (second spell) ===
Taylor had returned to manage England's U-21 team for a second spell in 2004, combining the role with his job at Hull. England comfortably progressed from their qualification group for the 2006 finals but lost to eventual semi-finalists France in a play-off over two legs. He initially retained his position after joining Crystal Palace, and the team qualified for the 2007 finals. However, he left in January 2007 as the new senior manager, Steve McClaren, wanted the England U-21 manager's role to be a full-time position. Taylor's record in competitive fixtures in his second spell with the U21s was nine wins, five draws and two defeats from sixteen games.

=== Crystal Palace ===
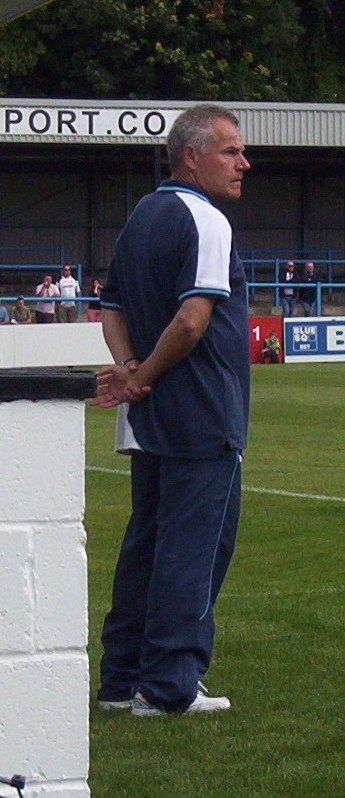
Taylor on the sidelines as Dover Athletic manager.

Success at Hull drew attention from other clubs, and Taylor returned to former club Crystal Palace in June 2006 after Palace agreed a £300,000 compensation package with Hull. He only lasted sixteen months at Selhurst Park as he was sacked in October 2007 after a run of poor form left the Eagles hovering dangerously above the bottom three.

=== Stevenage Borough ===
A few weeks after his departure from Palace, Taylor was appointed manager of Conference team Stevenage Borough in November 2007. His first purchase in this role was Junior Lewis, a player he had previously brought into five other clubs (Dover, Gillingham, Leicester, Brighton and Hull).

On 28 April 2008, Taylor left Stevenage Borough after six months in charge when his short-term contract expired and he had failed to get them into the end of season play-offs. They finished the season in sixth place, 22 points behind the champions, having been in third place and just four points off top spot when he took charge.

=== Wycombe Wanderers ===
On 29 May 2008, he became Wycombe Wanderers manager, following the resignation of Paul Lambert after their failure to reach the League Two play-off final. He signed Junior Lewis, this time as first team coach. Taylor had a successful start to the 2008–09 season as Wycombe went on an 18-game unbeaten run in the league with promotion to League One being secured on the final day of the season. However, he was dismissed on 9 October 2009 after Wycombe's slow start to the League One season.

=== Bradford City ===
On 16 February 2010, Taylor replaced Stuart McCall to become manager of League Two side Bradford City, initially on a three-month contract until the end of the 2009–10 season. Junior Lewis was employed as first team coach, working with assistant manager Wayne Jacobs and youth team coach David Wetherall. Taylor signed a one-year contract at Bradford the day before Bradford played Northampton. In January 2011, Taylor turned down an offer from Premier League Newcastle United to be assistant to their new manager Alan Pardew. After three successive defeats later in the month, Taylor came under pressure but vowed to carry on, saying: "I'm not a fool, I can tell that I'm probably not the most popular manager Bradford City's ever had. I'm not prepared to walk away, I'm prepared to take this difficult job head on." City's run of poor form continued and the following month, Taylor and City parted company by mutual consent; although the announcement came before City's game with Stockport County, Taylor remained in charge for one final time.

=== Bahrain ===
On 11 July 2011, the Bahrain Football Association signed Taylor to train the national football team. Just a few months later he led Bahrain to winning the football tournament at the 1st GCC Games in Manama, the first time Bahrain's national team had won a regional competition in their history. Bahrain beat arch rivals Saudi Arabia 3–1 in a one-sided final. Taylor received a lot of praise from the players, fans and officials for his achievement.

Two months later, Taylor successfully led the Bahrainian team to clinch football gold in the 2011 Arab Games in Doha, beating Jordan 1–0 in the final with a last-gasp goal by striker Ismail Abdullatif.

Asked in April 2012 about the arrest and torture of up to 150 pro-democracy athletes, including three of his own players, Taylor told reporters: "Don't go there. You're getting boring."

FIFA had to investigate a match after Bahrain defeated Indonesia 10–0, in a World Cup qualifier. Bahrain needed to overcome a 9–0 deficit to have a chance of qualifying for the next stage.

He was sacked on 17 October 2012 after a 2–6 loss to United Arab Emirates in a friendly match.

=== England U-20 ===
In March 2013, Taylor was appointed as the England national under-20 football team manager on a two-month contract, to lead the team who had qualified for the 2013 FIFA U-20 World Cup in Turkey. In the finals, England under Taylor were knocked out in the group stages, drawing with Iraq and Chile, and losing to Egypt; England finished bottom of their group.

=== Return to Gillingham ===
In October 2013, Taylor was appointed Gillingham manager for the second time, on an interim basis, following the club's sacking of Martin Allen. On 11 November he was appointed full-time manager, with a contract lasting until the end of the season. He was relieved of his duties on 31 December 2014.

=== Kerala Blasters ===
On 8 May 2015, Indian Super League club Kerala Blasters appointed Taylor as the head coach for the season. However, four defeats in a row in the 14-game season put the club in serious jeopardy and, on 28 October 2015, Taylor was dismissed from his post.

=== New Zealand (assistant) and third Gillingham spell ===
In September 2016, Taylor accepted the offer to become assistant to Anthony Hudson with the New Zealand men's national football team. Taylor was to be based in England and mainly to work with the New Zealand players based there.

In May 2017 he was appointed as director of football at Gillingham, alongside his New Zealand duties. He was appointed Gillingham's interim manager following the departure of head coach Adrian Pennock on 25 September 2017. He left both roles at Gillingham on 12 October 2017.

=== Dagenham & Redbridge ===
Taylor was appointed manager of National League club Dagenham & Redbridge on 5 June 2018, with Terry Harris as his assistant. Taylor left Dagenham & Redbridge in December 2019; the club stated that a change was required due to recent results.

=== Welling United ===
On 28 September 2021, Taylor was appointed manager of National League South club Welling United. On 13 March 2022, after 166 days in charge, Taylor departed Welling after a 1–1 draw against Bath City four points above the relegation zone, with bottom club Billericay Town having a game in hand over Welling.

=== Maldon & Tiptree ===
On 13 December 2022, Taylor was appointed manager of Isthmian League North Division club Maldon & Tiptree. On 20 August 2023, Taylor left Maldon & Tiptree.

=== Canvey Island ===
On 7 May 2025, Taylor was appointed manager of Isthmian League Premier Division club Canvey Island, the club he started at as a youth player. He resigned from his role on 22 October 2025.

== Honours ==
=== As a player ===
Southend United

- Football League Fourth Division runner-up: 1971–72

Individual

- Crystal Palace Player of the Season: 1973–74, 1975–76

=== As a manager ===
Gillingham

- Football League Second Division play-offs: 2000

Brighton & Hove Albion

- Football League Second Division: 2001–02

Hull City

- Football League Third Division promotion: 2003–04
- Football League One promotion: 2004–05

Wycombe Wanderers

- Football League Two promotion: 2008–09

Bahrain

- Pan Arab Games Gold Medal: 2011
- GCC Games Gold Medal: 2011

Individual

- Premier League Manager of the Month: September 2000
- Football League One Manager of the Month: December 2004
- Football League Two Manager of the Month: November 2008

== Career statistics ==
=== International ===
Appearances and goals by national team and year
National team	Year	Apps	Goals
England	1976	4	2
Total		4	2

Scores and results list England's goal tally first, score column indicates score after each Taylor goal.

List of international goals scored by Peter Taylor
No.	Date	Venue	Opponent	Score	Result	Competition	Ref.
1	24 March 1976	Racecourse Ground, Wrexham, Wales	Wales	2–0	2–1	Friendly	
2	8 May 1976	Ninian Park, Cardiff, Wales	Wales	1–0	1–0	1975–76 British Home Championship	

=== Managerial ===
As of match played 23 October 2025

Team	Nat	From	To	Record				
Team	Nat	From	To	G	W	D	L	Win %
Southend United	(England)	August 1993	February 1995	84	27	16	41	32.14
England U-21s	(England)	July 1996	June 1999	20	12	6	2	60.00
Gillingham	(England)	July 1999	June 2000	62	34	12	16	54.84
Leicester City	(England)	June 2000	September 2001	54	19	9	26	35.19
England	(England)	November 2000	November 2000	1	0	0	1	0.00
Brighton & Hove Albion	(England)	October 2001	May 2002	38	21	11	6	55.26
Hull City	(England)	October 2002	June 2006	184	77	50	57	41.85
England U-21s	(England)	2004	January 2007	16	9	2	5	56.25
Crystal Palace	(England)	June 2006	October 2007	60	21	16	23	35.00
Stevenage Borough	(England)	November 2007	April 2008	32	13	4	15	40.63
Wycombe Wanderers	(England)	May 2008	October 2009	46	19	17	10	41.30
Bradford City	(England)	February 2010	February 2011	46	18	7	21	39.13
Bahrain	(Bahrain)	July 2011	October 2012	20	7	6	7	35.00
England U-20s	(England)	March 2013	July 2014	3	0	2	1	0.00
Gillingham	(England)	October 2013	December 2014	67	23	14	30	34.33
Kerala Blasters	(India)	May 2015	October 2015	6	1	1	4	16.67
Gillingham (caretaker)	(England)	25 September 2017	12 October 2017	4	1	1	2	25.00
Dagenham & Redbridge	(England)	5 June 2018	29 December 2019	81	25	20	36	30.86
Welling United	(England)	28 September 2021	13 March 2022	25	6	5	14	24.00
Maldon & Tiptree	(England)	13 December 2022	21 August 2023	24	9	7	8	37.50
Canvey Island	(England)	7 May 2025	23 October 2025	11	1	1	9	9.09
Total				884	343	206	335	38.80
