= List of Kerala Blasters FC seasons =

Kerala Blasters is an Indian professional football club based in Kochi, Kerala. The club participates in the Indian Super League, the top tier of Indian football. The club was established on 27 May 2014 and began their first professional season a few months later in October 2014. They play their home matches at the Jawaharlal Nehru Stadium and is one of the most supported football clubs in Asia.

== Key ==
Key to league competitions:

- Indian Super League – Rebranded India's Top Tier Football League, Established In 2014

Key to colours and symbols:

| 1st or W | Winners |
| 2nd or RU | Runners-up |
| 3rd | Third |
| ⭐ | Top scorer in division |
| 🇮🇳 | Top Indian scorer in division |

Key to league record:

- Season = The year and article of the season
- Finals = Final position
- P = Games played
- W = Games won
- D = Games drawn
- L = Games lost
- GF = Goals scored
- GA = Goals against
- Pts = Points

Key to cup record:

- En-dash (–) = The Blasters did not participate or cup not held
- R32 = Round of 32
- R16 = Round of 16
- QF = Quarter-finals
- SF = Semi-finals
- RU = Runners-up
- W = Winners

== Seasons ==
Correct as of the end of the 2025–26 season.

Seasons of Kerala Blasters FC
| Season | League | | | | | | | | Finals | Super Cup | Other competitions | Top scorer(s) | |
| Season | Pld | W | D | L | GF | GA | Pts | Pos | Finals | Super Cup | Durand Cup | Player(s) | Goals |
|---|---|---|---|---|---|---|---|---|---|---|---|---|---|
| 2014 | 14 | 5 | 4 | 5 | 9 | 11 | 19 | 4th | Runners-up | Did not exist | — | (Canada) Iain Hume | 5 |
| 2015 | 14 | 3 | 4 | 7 | 22 | 27 | 13 | 8th | DNQ | Did not exist | — | (England) Antonio German (England) Chris Dagnall | 6 |
| 2016 | 14 | 6 | 4 | 4 | 12 | 14 | 22 | 2nd | Runners-up | Did not exist | — | (India) C.K. Vineeth | 5 🇮🇳 |
| 2017–18 | 18 | 6 | 7 | 5 | 20 | 22 | 25 | 6th | DNQ | R16 | — | (Canada) Iain Hume | 5 |
| 2018–19 | 18 | 2 | 9 | 7 | 18 | 28 | 15 | 9th | DNQ | Qualifiers | — | (Serbia) Slaviša Stojanović (Slovenia) Matej Poplatnik | 4 |
| 2019–20 | 18 | 4 | 7 | 7 | 29 | 32 | 19 | 7th | DNQ | Tournament suspended | — | (Nigeria) Bartholomew Ogbeche | 15 ⭐ |
| 2020–21 | 20 | 3 | 8 | 9 | 23 | 36 | 17 | 10th | DNQ | Tournament suspended | — | (Australia) Jordan Murray | 7 |
| 2021–22 | 20 | 9 | 7 | 4 | 34 | 24 | 34 | 4th | Runners-up | Tournament suspended | Group stage | (Argentina) Jorge Pereyra Díaz (Spain) Álvaro Vázquez | 8 |
| 2022–23 | 20 | 10 | 1 | 9 | 28 | 28 | 31 | 5th | Knockout round | Group stage | Quarter-finals | (Greece) Dimitrios Diamantakos | 12 |
| 2023–24 | 22 | 10 | 3 | 9 | 32 | 31 | 33 | 5th | Knockout round | Group stage | Group stage | (Greece) Dimitrios Diamantakos | 16 ⭐ |
| 2024–25 | 24 | 8 | 5 | 11 | 33 | 37 | 29 | 8th | DNQ | Quarter-finals | Quarter-finals | (Morocco) Noah Sadaoui | 14 |
| 2025–26 | 13 | 5 | 2 | 6 | 15 | 17 | 17 | 8th | SUSP | GS | DNP | (Spain) Víctor Bertomeu | 4 |

== See also ==
- Kerala Blasters FC
- Kerala Blasters FC Reserves and Academy
- List of Kerala Blasters FC records and statistics
- List of Kerala Blasters FC players
- List of Kerala Blasters FC managers
- Kerala Blasters FC results by opponent
