= Kerala Blasters FC results by opponent =

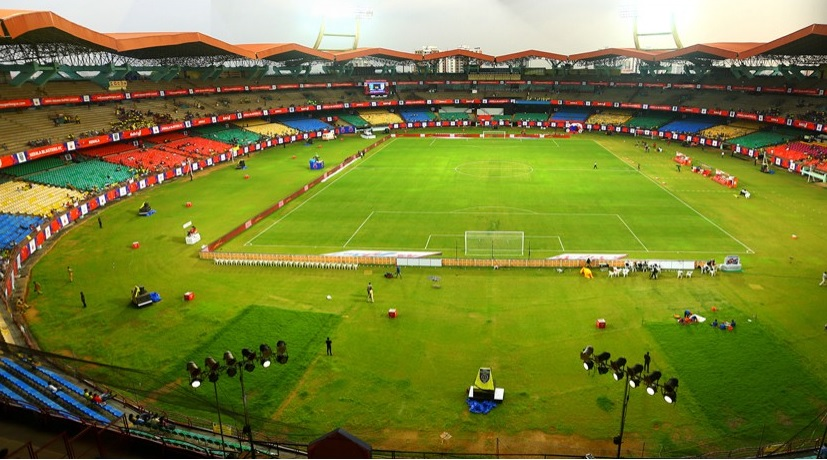
The Nehru Stadium before a Kerala Blasters match in 2014.

Kerala Blasters is an Indian professional football club based in Kochi, Kerala. The club participates in the Indian Super League since its inception. The club was established on 27 May 2014 and began their first professional season a few months later in October 2014. They play their home matches at the Jawaharlal Nehru Stadium.

== Indian Super League ==
The table that follows is accurate as of the last match against Chennaiyin on 31 October 2026

Note: The following table contains the results of Kerala Blasters Football Club against all the clubs participating in the Indian Super League. Defunct clubs are marked in Italics.

Club	P	W	D	L	P	W	D	L	P	W	D	L	P	W	D	L	Win %	First
Club	Home				Away				Neutral				Total				Win %	First
Mohun Bagan (Note: Includes games played against ATK before the merger with Mohun Bagan)	10	2	3	5	10	3	3	4	5	0	1	4	25	5	7	13	20.00	2014
Chennaiyin FC	11	5	3	3	11	1	5	5	4	2	2	0	26	8	10	8	30.77	2014
Odisha FC	11	6	4	1	11	2	3	6	4	2	1	1	26	10	8	8	38.46	2014
FC Goa	10	5	1	4	9	1	0	8	4	0	3	1	23	6	4	13	26.09	2014
Mumbai City	11	3	5	3	9	1	2	6	4	2	0	2	24	6	7	11	25.00	2014
NorthEast United	10	4	6	0	10	3	2	5	4	1	2	1	24	8	10	6	33.33	2014
Pune City	5	3	1	1	5	2	2	1	-	-	-	-	10	5	3	2	50.00	2014
Bengaluru FC	6	3	0	3	8	1	1	6	4	1	1	2	18	5	2	11	27.78	2017
Jamshedpur FC	7	3	4	0	6	1	2	3	6	2	3	1	19	6	9	4	31.58	2017
Hyderabad FC	4	2	0	2	5	2	1	2	5	2	1	2	14	6	2	6	42.86	2019
East Bengal	3	2	0	1	4	1	1	2	4	1	3	0	11	4	4	3	36.36	2020
Punjab FC	3	0	0	3	2	2	0	0	0	0	0	0	5	2	0	3	40.00	2023
Mohammedan SC	2	2	0	0	1	1	0	0	0	0	0	0	3	3	0	0	100.00	2024
Inter Kashi	1	0	0	1	1	1	0	0	0	0	0	0	2	1	0	1	50.00	2026
Total	94	40	27	27	92	22	22	48	44	13	17	14	230	75	66	89	32.61	

== Super Cup ==
As of 6 November 2025
Note: The following table contains the results of Kerala Blasters Football Club against the clubs which they faced in the Super Cup .

Club	P	W	D	L	P	W	D	L	P	W	D	L	P	W	D	L	Win %	First
Club	Home				Away				Neutral				Total				Win %	First
NEROCA	0	0	0	0	0	0	0	0	1	0	0	1	1	0	0	1	0.00	2018
Indian Arrows	0	0	0	0	0	0	0	0	1	0	0	1	1	0	0	1	0.00	2019
RoundGlass Punjab	0	0	0	0	0	0	0	0	1	1	0	0	1	1	0	0	100.00	2023
Sreenidi Deccan	0	0	0	0	0	0	0	0	1	0	0	1	1	0	0	1	0.00	2023
Bengaluru	0	0	0	0	0	0	0	0	1	0	1	0	1	0	1	0	0.00	2023
Shillong Lajong	0	0	0	0	0	0	0	0	1	1	0	0	1	1	0	0	100.00	2024
Jamshedpur	0	0	0	0	0	0	0	0	1	0	0	1	1	0	0	1	0.00	2024
NorthEast United	0	0	0	0	0	0	0	0	1	0	0	1	1	0	0	1	0.00	2024
East Bengal	0	0	0	0	0	0	0	0	1	1	0	0	1	1	0	0	100.00	2025
Mohun Bagan	0	0	0	0	0	0	0	0	1	0	0	1	1	0	0	1	0.00	2025
Rajasthan United	0	0	0	0	0	0	0	0	1	1	0	0	1	1	0	0	100.00	2025
Sporting Delhi	0	0	0	0	0	0	0	0	1	1	0	0	1	1	0	0	100.00	2025
Mumbai City	0	0	0	0	0	0	0	0	1	0	0	1	1	0	0	1	0.00	2025
Total	0	0	0	0	0	0	0	0	13	5	1	7	13	5	1	7	38.46	

== Durand Cup ==
As of 23 August 2024

Note: The following table contains the results of Kerala Blasters Football Club against the clubs which they faced in the Durand Cup.

Club	P	W	D	L	P	W	D	L	Win %	First
Club	Neutral				Total				Win %	First
Bengaluru FC	3	0	1	2	3	0	1	2	0.00	2021
Delhi FC	1	0	0	1	1	0	0	1	0.00	2021
Indian Navy	1	1	0	0	1	1	0	0	100.00	2021
Mumbai City	1	1	0	0	1	1	0	0	100.00	2024
NorthEast United	1	1	0	0	1	1	0	0	100.00	2022
Odisha FC	1	0	0	1	1	0	0	1	0.00	2022
Sudeva Delhi	1	0	1	0	1	0	1	0	0.00	2022
Army Green	1	1	0	0	1	1	0	0	100.00	2022
Mohammedan SC	1	0	0	0	1	0	0	0	0.00	2022
Gokulam Kerala	1	0	0	1	1	0	0	0	0.00	2023
Indian Air Force	1	1	0	0	1	0	0	0	100.00	2023
Punjab FC	1	0	1	0	1	0	1	0	0.00	2024
CISF Protectors	1	1	0	0	1	1	0	0	100.00	2024
Total`	15	6	3	6	15	6	3	6	40.00	

== See also ==
- Kerala Blasters
- Kerala Blasters FC Reserves and Academy
- List of Kerala Blasters FC records and statistics
- List of Kerala Blasters FC Seasons
- List of Kerala Blasters FC players
- List of Kerala Blasters FC managers
