= List of Kerala Blasters FC players =

Kerala Blasters FC is an Indian professional football club that competes in the Indian Super League, the top-tier of Indian football. The club was established on 27 May 2014 and began their first professional season a few months later in October 2014. They play their home matches at the Jawaharlal Nehru Stadium, Kochi.

The following list includes all the appearances and goals scored by the Blasters' players across Durand Cup, Super Cup, and the Indian Super League.

== Players ==
As of 31 October 2026

Notes:

- This list includes players who have made at least one appearance for Kerala Blasters FC's senior team in an official competition
- Players whose only appearances for the club were for the reserve team in the 2022 Durand Cup are excluded.

Name	Position	Country	Years	League		Other		Total	
Name	Position	Country	Years	Games	Goals	Games	Goals	Games	Goals
Andrew Barisic	FW	Australia	2014	11	0	0	0	11	0
Pedro Gusmão	FW	Brazil	2014	7	1	0	0	7	1
Iain Hume	FW	Canada	2014, 2017–2018	29	10	0	0	29	10
David James	GK	England	2014	12	0	0	0	12	0
Michael Chopra	FW	England	2014, 2016	19	1	0	0	19	1
Cédric Hengbart	DF	France	2014, 2016	30	1	0	0	30	1
Raphaël Romey	DF	France	2014	8	0	0	0	8	0
Avinabo Bag	DF	India	2014	5	0	0	0	5	0
Chinadorai Sabeeth	FW	India	2014	8	1	0	0	8	1
Godwin Franco	MF	India	2014	4	0	0	0	4	0
Gurwinder Singh	DF	India	2014–2015	14	0	0	0	14	0
Ishfaq Ahmed	MF	India	2014–2016	25	1	0	0	25	1
Luis Barreto	GK	India	2014	1	0	0	0	1	0
Mehtab Hossain	MF	India	2014–2016	38	0	0	0	38	0
Milagres Gonsalves	FW	India	2014	13	1	0	0	13	1
Nirmal Chettri	DF	India	2014–2015	12	0	0	0	12	0
Ramandeep Singh	DF	India	2014–2015	1	0	0	0	1	0
Renedy Singh	MF	India	2014	2	0	0	0	2	0
Sandesh Jhingan	DF	India	2014–2020	76	0	2	0	78	0
Sandip Nandy	GK	India	2014–2018	18	0	0	0	18	0
Saumik Dey	DF	India	2014–2015	18	0	0	0	18	0
Sushanth Mathew	MF	India	2014	4	1	0	0	4	1
Penn Orji	MF	Nigeria	2014	13	2	0	0	13	2
Colin Falvey	DF	Ireland	2014	9	0	0	0	9	0
Jamie McAllister	DF	Scotland	2014	6	0	0	0	6	0
Stephen Pearson	MF	Scotland	2014	17	1	0	0	17	1
Pulga	MF	Spain	2014–2015, 2018	16	1	1	1	17	2
Chris Dagnall	FW	England	2015	13	6	0	0	13	6
Josu	MF	Spain	2015–2016	25	1	0	0	25	1
Stephen Bywater	GK	England	2015	12	0	0	0	12	0
Marcus Williams	DF	England	2015	5	0	0	0	5	0
Rahul Bheke	DF	India	2015	12	0	0	0	12	0
Mohammed Rafi	FW	India	2015–2016, 2019–2020	29	6	0	0	29	6
Bruno Perone	DF	Brazil	2015	10	0	0	0	10	0
C.K. Vineeth	MF	India	2015–2018	42	11	1	0	43	11
Cavin Lobo	MF	India	2015	6	1	0	0	6	1
Sanchez Watt	FW	England	2015	9	2	0	0	9	2
Carlos Marchena	DF	Spain	2015	1	0	0	0	1	0
Rodrigo Arroz	DF	Brazil	2015	1	0	0	0	1	0
Peter Carvalho	MF	India	2015	2	0	0	0	2	0
João Coimbra	MF	Portugal	2015	11	1	0	0	11	1
Deepak Mondal	DF	India	2015	2	0	0	0	2	0
Antonio German	FW	Grenada	2015–2016	23	6	0	0	23	6
Manandeep Singh	FW	India	2015	2	0	0	0	2	0
Peter Ramage	DF	England	2015	14	0	0	0	14	0
Shankar Sampingiraj	MF	India	2015	3	0	0	0	3	0
Thongkhosiem Haokip	FW	India	2016	1	0	0	0	1	0
Pratik Chaudhari	DF	India	2016	8	0	0	0	8	0
Kervens Belfort	FW	Haiti	2016	15	3	0	0	15	3
Aaron Hughes	DF	Northern Ireland	2016	11	1	0	0	11	1
Graham Stack	GK	Ireland	2016	8	0	0	0	8	0
Elhadji Ndoye	DF	Senegal	2016	5	0	0	0	5	0
Mohammed Rafique	MF	India	2016	10	0	0	0	10	0
Rino Anto	DF	India	2016–2018	16	0	1	0	17	0
Didier Kadio	MF	Ivory Coast	2016	12	1	0	0	12	1
Vinit Rai	MF	India	2016	2	0	0	0	2	0
Duckens Nazon	FW	Haiti	2016	13	2	0	0	13	2
Azrak Mahamat	MF	Chad	2016	14	0	0	0	14	0
Prasanth Karuthadathkuni	FW	India	2016–2022	61	1	5	1	66	2
Farukh Choudhary	FW	India	2016	2	0	0	0	2	0
Lalruatthara	DF	India	2017–2021	37	0	1	0	38	0
Milan Singh	MF	India	2017–18	15	0	1	0	16	0
Arata Izumi	MF	India	2017–18	6	0	1	0	7	0
Subhasish Roy Chowdhury	GK	India	2017–18	7	0	0	0	7	0
Jackichand Singh	MF	India	2017–18	17	2	0	0	17	2
Siam Hanghal	MF	India	2017–18	8	0	0	0	8	0
Pritam Singh	DF	India	2017–2020	6	0	1	0	7	0
Samuel Shadap	DF	India	2017–18	4	0	0	0	4	0
Loken Meitei	MF	India	2017–2019	6	0	1	0	7	0
Karan Sawhney	FW	India	2017–2018	4	0	0	0	4	0
Courage Pekuson	MF	Ghana	2017–2019	30	2	1	0	31	2
Nemanja Lakić-Pešić	DF	Serbia	2017–2019	26	0	2	0	28	0
Wes Brown	DF	England	2017–2018	14	1	1	0	15	1
Paul Rachubka	GK	England	2017–18	12	0	1	0	13	0
Mark Sifneos	FW	Netherlands	2017–18	12	4	0	0	12	4
Dimitar Berbatov	FW	Bulgaria	2017–18	9	1	0	0	9	1
Sahal Abdul Samad	MF	India	2017–2023	92	10	5	0	97	10
Deependra Negi	MF	India	2017–2019	3	1	0	0	3	1
Kizito Keziron	MF	Uganda	2017–2019	17	0	1	0	18	0
Guðjón Baldvinsson	FW	Iceland	2018	6	1	0	0	6	1
Dheeraj Singh	GK	India	2018–2019	13	0	1	0	14	0
Nikola Krčmarević	MF	Serbia	2018–2019	12	2	1	0	13	2
Cyril Kali	DF	Saint Martin	2018–2019	14	0	0	0	14	0
Slaviša Stojanović	FW	Serbia	2018–2020	16	4	1	0	17	4
Seiminlen Doungel	FW	India	2018–2019	18	2	1	0	19	2
Matej Poplatnik	FW	Slovenia	2018–2020	16	4	1	0	17	4
Mohammad Rakip	DF	India	2018–2020	26	0	1	0	27	0
Anas Edathodika	DF	India	2018–2019	8	0	1	0	9	0
Halicharan Narzary	MF	India	2018–2020	26	2	0	0	26	2
Zakeer Mundampara	MF	India	2018–2019	5	0	1	0	6	0
Naveen Kumar	GK	India	2018–2019	5	0	0	0	5	0
Suraj Rawat	MF	India	2018–2019	2	0	0	0	2	0
Abdul Hakku	DF	India	2018–2022	11	1	1	0	12	1
Jeakson Singh	MF	India	2018–2024	78	2	8	0	86	2
Baoringdao Bodo	FW	India	2019	2	0	0	0	2	0
Nongdamba Naorem	FW	India	2018–2020	3	0	0	0	3	0
Mario Arqués	MF	Spain	2019–2020	6	0	0	0	6	0
Bartholomew Ogbeche	FW	Nigeria	2019–2020	16	15	0	0	16	15
Rahul KP	MF	India	2019–2025	81	8	8	1	89	9
Sergio Cidoncha	MF	Spain	2019–2021	16	2	0	0	16	2
Gianni Zuiverloon	DF	Netherlands	2019–2020	8	0	0	0	8	0
Bilal Khan	GK	India	2019–2021	5	0	0	0	5	0
Moustapha Gning	MF	Senegal	2019–2020	13	0	0	0	13	0
Rehenesh TP	GK	India	2019–2020	13	0	0	0	13	0
Darren Caldeira	MF	India	2019–2020	1	0	0	0	1	0
Jessel Carneiro	DF	India	2019–2023	63	0	3	0	66	0
Seityasen Singh	MF	India	2019–2022	25	1	3	0	28	1
Jairo Rodrigues	DF	Brazil	2019	4	0	0	0	4	0
Raphaël Messi Bouli	FW	Cameroon	2019–2020	17	8	0	0	17	8
Samuel Lalmuanpuia	FW	India	2019–2020	5	0	0	0	5	0
Raju Gaikwad	DF	India	2019–2020	12	0	0	0	12	0
Vlatko Drobarov	DF	North Macedonia	2019–2020	13	1	0	0	13	1
Givson Singh	MF	India	2020–2024	7	0	1	0	8	0
Nishu Kumar	DF	India	2020–2024	37	1	3	1	40	2
Albino Gomes	GK	India	2020–2022	24	0	2	0	26	0
Prabsukhan Gill	GK	India	2020–2023	39	0	1	0	40	0
Ayush Adhikari	MF	India	2020–2023	25	0	5	0	30	0
Ritwik Das	MF	India	2020–2021	4	0	0	0	4	0
Denechandra Meitei	DF	India	2020–2023	9	0	1	0	10	0
Rohit Kumar	MF	India	2020–2021	11	0	0	0	11	0
Sandeep Singh	DF	India	2020–	79	1	9	0	88	1
Facundo Pereyra	SS	Argentina	2020–2021	12	0	0	0	12	0
Puitea	MF	India	2020–2022	36	1	3	0	39	1
Vicente Gómez	MF	Spain	2020–2021	19	2	0	0	19	2
Gary Hooper	FW	England	2020–2021	18	5	0	0	18	5
Costa Nhamoinesu	DF	Zimbabwe	2020–2021	16	2	0	0	16	2
Jordan Murray	FW	Australia	2020–2021	19	7	0	0	19	7
Bakary Koné	DF	Burkina Faso	2020–2021	14	0	0	0	14	0
Juande	MF	Spain	2020–2021	10	0	0	0	10	0
Sanjeev Stalin	DF	India	2021–2022	8	0	1	0	9	0
Sachin Suresh	GK	India	2021–2026	32	0	17	0	49	0
Hormipam Ruivah	DF	India	2021–	77	0	13	0	90	0
Vincy Barretto	MF	India	2021–2022	17	2	2	0	19	2
Harmanjot Khabra	DF	India	2021–2023	26	2	2	0	28	2
Adrián Luna	MF	Uruguay	2021–	78	13	12	2	90	15
Enes Sipović	DF	Bosnia and Herzegovina	2021–2022	14	1	3	0	17	1
Jorge Pereyra Díaz	FW	Argentina	2021–2022	21	8	0	0	21	8
Álvaro Vázquez	FW	Spain	2021–2022	23	8	0	0	23	8
Chencho Gyeltshen	FW	Bhutan	2021–2022	18	0	1	0	19	0
Sreekuttan VS	MF	India	2021–2022	0	0	2	0	2	0
Marko Lešković	DF	Croatia	2021–2024	48	1	5	0	53	1
Bijoy Varghese	DF	India	2021–2025	6	0	4	0	10	0
Karanjit Singh	GK	India	2021–2024	9	0	0	0	9	0
Bryce Miranda	MF	India	2022–2025	12	0	8	0	20	0
Saurav Mandal	MF	India	2022–2025	21	0	5	0	26	0
Apostolos Giannou	FW	Australia	2022–2023	17	2	3	0	20	2
Víctor Mongil	DF	Spain	2022–2023	19	0	3	0	22	0
Ivan Kalyuzhnyi	MF	Ukraine	2022–2023	18	4	1	0	19	4
Bidyashagar Singh	FW	India	2022–2024	7	0	7	3	14	3
Dimitrios Diamantakos	FW	Greece	2022–2024	38	23	6	5	44	28
Vibin Mohanan	MF	India	2022–	60	3	13	0	73	3
Nihal Sudeesh	MF	India	2022–2026	23	2	9	0	32	2
Mohammed Aimen	FW	India	2022–2025	31	1	19	8	50	9
Mohammed Azhar	MF	India	2022–2025	22	0	13	1	35	1
Sreekuttan M.S.	FW	India	2022–	6	1	3	1	9	2
Danish Farooq Bhat	MF	India	2023–2026	56	3	17	1	73	4
Muhammed Saheef	DF	India	2022–2026	12	0	15	0	27	0
Prabir Das	DF	India	2023–2025	9	0	5	1	14	1
Naocha Singh	DF	India	2023–	49	0	12	1	61	1
Pritam Kotal	DF	India	2023–2025	33	0	6	0	39	0
Lara Sharma	GK	India	2023–2024	3	0	0	0	3	0
Yoihenba Meitei	MF	India	2023–2026	5	0	6	0	11	0
Justine Emmanuel	FW	Nigeria	2023–2024	6	0	3	2	9	2
Ishan Pandita	FW	India	2023–2025	18	0	3	2	21	2
Miloš Drinčić	DF	Montenegro	2023–2025	40	3	9	0	49	3
Kwame Peprah	FW	Ghana	2023–2025	35	8	8	6	43	14
Aibanbha Dohling	DF	India	2023–	28	0	7	0	35	0
Freddy Lallawmawma	MF	India	2023–	39	1	7	0	46	1
Daisuke Sakai	MF	Japan	2023–2024	21	3	3	0	24	3
Fedor Černych	FW	Lithuania	2024	10	3	0	0	10	3
Korou Singh	MF	India	2024–	25	2	4	1	29	3
Aritra Das	DF	India	2024-2025	2	0	5	1	7	1
Som Kumar	GK	India	2024–2025	4	0	4	0	8	0
R. Lalthanmawia	MF	India	2024–2026	11	0	1	0	12	0
Noah Sadaoui	FW	Morocco	2024–2026	19	7	9	7	28	14
Nora Fernandes	GK	India	2024–2026	3	0	4	0	7	0
Alexandre Coeff	DF	France	2024–2025	13	1	1	0	14	1
Jesús Jiménez	FW	Spain	2024–2025	18	11	2	1	20	12
Dušan Lagator	DF	Montenegro	2025–2026	7	1	4	0	11	1
Bikash Yumnam	DF	India	2025–	12	0	5	0	17	0
Kamaljit Singh	GK	India	2025	1	0	0	0	1	0
Amey Ranawade	DF	India	2025–	1	0	1	0	2	0
Arsh Anwer Shaikh	GK	India	2025–	14	0	0	0	14	0
Sumit Sharma	DF	India	2025–	3	0	0	0	3	0
Tiago Alves	FW	Portugal	2025–2026	2	0	0	0	2	0
Juan Rodríguez	DF	Spain	2025–2026	0	0	3	0	3	0
Jai Quitongo	FW	Scotland	2026	5	0	0	0	5	0
Koldo Obieta	FW	Spain	2026	0	0	3	3	3	3
Fallou Ndiaye	DF	Senegal	2026–	10	2	0	0	10	2
Kévin Yoke	FW	France	2026	13	1	0	0	13	1
Karim Benarif	MF	Morocco	2026	3	0	0	0	3	0
Matías Hernández	MF	Spain	2026	8	1	0	0	8	1
Marlon Roos-Trujillo	MF	Germany	2026	6	0	0	0	6	0
Víctor Bertomeu	FW	Spain	2026	10	4	0	0	10	4
Franchu	MF	Argentina	2026	6	2	0	0	6	2
Rowllin Borges	MF	India	2026	5	0	0	0	5	0
Muhammad Ajsal	FW	India	2026	10	1	5	2	15	3
Oumar Bah	DF	Guinea	2026	3	0	0	0	3	0
Ebindas Yesudasan	MF	India	2026–	14	0	5	0	19	0
James Bolton	DF	England	2026–	4	0	0	0	4	0
Nebojša Kosović	MF	Montenegro	2026–	4	0	0	0	4	0
Andre Green	FW	England	2026–	4	1	0	0	4	1
Paul Ramfangzauva	MF	India	2026–	1	0	0	0	1	0
Momo Yansané	FW	Guinea	2026–	4	1	0	0	4	1
Mohammed Sanan	MF	India	2026–	4	0	0	0	4	0
Amrinder Singh	GK	India	2026–	2	0	0	0	2	0

== Notable foreign internationals ==
- (England) David James (2014)
- (Canada) Iain Hume (2014 & 2017-2018)
- (Spain) Carlos Marchena (2015)
- (Northern Ireland) Aaron Hughes (2016–2017)
- (Haiti) Duckens Nazon (2016–2017)
- (England) Wes Brown (2017–2018)
- (Bulgaria) Dimitar Berbatov (2017–2018)
- (Uganda) Kizito Keziron (2017–2019)
- (Nigeria) Bartholomew Ogbeche (2019–2020)
- (Burkina Faso) Bakary Koné (2020–2021)
- (Zimbabwe) Costa Nhamoinesu (2020–2021)
- (Bhutan) Chencho Gyeltshen (2021–2022)
- (Croatia) Marko Lešković (2021–2024)
- (Greece) Dimitrios Diamantakos (2022–2024)
- (Ukraine) Ivan Kalyuzhnyi (2022–2023)
- (Lithuania) Fedor Černych (2024)

== By nationality ==
As of 25 October 2026

=== All Players ===
Country	Number of players
India	114
Spain	14
England	12
Brazil	4
France	4
Argentina	3
Australia	3
Montenegro	3
Nigeria	3
Scotland	3
Senegal	3
Serbia	3
Ghana	2
Guinea	2
Haiti	2
Ireland	2
Morocco	2
Netherlands	2
Portugal	2
Bhutan	1
Bosnia and Herzegovina	1
Bulgaria	1
Burkina Faso	1
Cameroon	1
Canada	1
Chad	1
Croatia	1
Germany	1
Greece	1
Grenada	1
Iceland	1
Ivory Coast	1
Japan	1
Lithuania	1
North Macedonia	1
Northern Ireland	1
Saint Martin	1
Slovenia	1
Uganda	1
Ukraine	1
Uruguay	1
Zimbabwe	1
TOTAL	206

== Club captains ==
Captain	Period
(Canada) Iain Hume (England) David James (France) Cédric Hengbart (Nigeria) Penn Orji	2014
(England) Peter Ramage	2015
(Northern Ireland) Aaron Hughes	2016
(India) Sandesh Jhingan	2017–2019
(Nigeria) Bartholomew Ogbeche	2019–2020
(India) Jessel Carneiro (Spain) Sergio Cidoncha (Zimbabwe) Costa Nhamoinesu	2020–2021
(India) Jessel Carneiro	2021–2022
(Uruguay) Adrián Luna (Note: When Adrián Luna was loaned to Persik Kediri in 2026 due to uncertainty in the league, Bikash Yumnam was appointed as the stand-in-captain for the season.)	2022–2026
(India) Vibin Mohanan	2026–

== See also ==
- Kerala Blasters
- List of Kerala Blasters FC records and statistics
- List of Kerala Blasters FC managers
- Kerala Blasters FC results by opponent
- List of Kerala Blasters FC Seasons
- Kerala Blasters FC Reserves and Academy
