= 2011 GCC Games =

2011 GCC Games دورة الألعاب الرياضية الأولى لدول مجلس التعاون
- Nations: 6
- Athletes: 1500
- Opening: 11 October
- Closing: 22 October
- Opened by: HRH Hamad bin Isa Al Khalifa
- Main venue: Bahrain National Stadium

The 2011 GCC Games was the first multi-sport event for the Gulf Cooperation Council (GCC) countries. It was held in Bahrain, from 11 October to 22 October 2011. Around 1,500 sportspeople participated in 11 sports.

== Sports ==
- Athletics
- Basketball
- Bowling
- Cycling
- Goalball
- Football (soccer)
- Volleyball
- Handball
- Equestrianism
- Table tennis
- Swimming

== Medal standings ==
* Host nation (Bahrain)

Rank	Nation	Gold	Silver	Bronze	Total
1	Kuwait (KUW)	14	8	7	29
2	Bahrain (BHR)*	8	6	5	19
3	Qatar (QAT)	7	11	2	20
4	United Arab Emirates (UAE)	4	9	8	21
5	Oman (OMA)	4	2	1	7
6	Saudi Arabia (KSA)	3	4	16	23
Totals (6 entries)		40	40	39	119

== Media Coverage ==
The host broadcaster is Abu Dhabi Sports Channel.

== Football ==
2011 GCC Games Football
Tournament details
- Host country: Bahrain
- Dates: 13 October – 22 October
- Teams: 6 (from 1 confederation)
- Venue: 1 (in 1 host city)

Final positions
- Champions: Bahrain (1st title)
- Runners-up: Saudi Arabia
- Third place: United Arab Emirates
- Fourth place: Qatar

Tournament statistics
- Matches played: 10
- Goals scored: 25 (2.5 per match)
- Top scorer: (Bahrain) Ismail Abdul-Latif (4 goals)

The Association football tournament at the 2011 Arab Gulf Games was held from 13 October to 22 October. All matches took place at Bahrain National Stadium in Riffa.

=== Competition ===
==== Group A ====
Team	Pld	W	D	L	GF	GA	GD	Pts
Bahrain	2	2	0	0	4	2	+2	6
Qatar	2	1	0	1	1	1	0	3
Oman	2	0	0	2	2	4	−2	0

===== Matches =====
October 13, 2011
17:45 UTC+3

Oman	0 – 1	Qatar
	Report	El Neel 61' (pen.)

Bahrain National Stadium, Riffa
Referee: Mishal Allasousi (Kuwait)

October 15, 2011
20:15 UTC+3

Bahrain	3 – 2	Oman
Abdul-Latif 3' (pen.); Al Huseiny 62'; H. Ali 89'	Report	Abdulhady 38'; Al Mumary 66'

Bahrain National Stadium, Riffa
Referee: Abdulwahid Khatir (UAE)

October 17, 2011
20:00 UTC+3

Qatar	0 – 1	Bahrain
	Report	Al Malod 81'

Bahrain National Stadium, Riffa
Referee: Fahad Abdulla (Saudi Arabia)

==== Group B ====
Team	Pld	W	D	L	GF	GA	GD	Pts
Saudi Arabia	2	1	1	0	3	1	+2	4
United Arab Emirates	2	0	2	0	1	1	0	2
Kuwait	2	0	1	1	0	2	−2	1

===== Matches =====
October 13, 2011
20:15 UTC+3

United Arab Emirates	1 – 1	Saudi Arabia
K. Ali 56'	Report	Khamees 27'

Bahrain National Stadium, Riffa
Referee: Abdulbaqui Yaqoob (Oman)

October 15, 2011
17:45 UTC+3

Kuwait	0 – 0	United Arab Emirates
	Report

Bahrain National Stadium, Riffa
Referee: A.Amar A.Sharehd (Bahrain)

October 17, 2011
17:30 UTC+3

Saudi Arabia	2 – 0	Kuwait
Bahberi 81'; Abdu 90+5'	Report

Bahrain National Stadium, Riffa
Referee: Abdulrahaman Abdu (Qatar)

==== Semi-finals ====
October 20, 2011
17:30 UTC+3

Bahrain	4 – 2	United Arab Emirates
Abdul-Latif 12'; Hardan 44'; Al Huseiny 44', 51'	Report	Salim 33'; Shamroukh 57'

Bahrain National Stadium, Riffa
Referee: Abdulbaqui Yaqoob (Oman)

October 20, 2011
20:00 UTC+3

Saudi Arabia	2 – 0	Qatar
Sefiani 23', 63'	Report

Bahrain National Stadium, Riffa
Referee: A.Amar A.Sharehd (Bahrain)

==== Third-place match ====
October 22, 2011
16:00 UTC+3

United Arab Emirates	2 – 0	Qatar
Hassan 4'; Salim 65'	Report

Bahrain National Stadium, Riffa
Referee: Mishal Allasousi (Kuwait)

==== Final ====
October 22, 2011
18:15 UTC+3

Bahrain	3 – 1	Saudi Arabia
Hardan 39'; Abdul-Latif 62' (pen.), 71'	Report	Al-Khames 60'

Bahrain National Stadium, Riffa
Referee: Abdulrahaman Abdu (Qatar)

Winner of 2011 GCC Games Football Tournament

Bahrain
First title

==== Final rankings ====
Rank	Team
1	Bahrain
2	Saudi Arabia
3	United Arab Emirates
4	Qatar
5	Kuwait
6	Oman

=== Scorers ===
4 goals

- (Bahrain) Ismail Abdul-Latif

3 goals

- (Bahrain) Samy Al Huseiny

2 goals

- (Bahrain) Fahad Hardan
- (Saudi Arabia) Bader Al-Khames
- (Saudi Arabia) Rabeaa Sefiani
- (United Arab Emirates) Fahad Salim

1 goal

- (Bahrain) Abdulwahab Al Malod
- (Bahrain) Hussain Ali Baba
- (Qatar) Mohamed El Neel
- (Oman) Abdulla Abdulhady
- (Oman) Abdulla Al Mumary
- (Saudi Arabia) Ahmed Abdu
- (Saudi Arabia) Hatan Bahberi
- (United Arab Emirates) Abdulla Hassan
- (United Arab Emirates) Ahmed Shamroukh
- (United Arab Emirates) Khamis Ali
