= 2011–12 East Bengal FC season =

Indian football club season

East Bengal
2011–12 season
- President: Dr Pranab Dasgupta
- Head-Coach: (England) Trevor Morgan
- Ground: Salt Lake Stadium; Kalyani Stadium; East Bengal Ground
- I-League: Runner-up
- Calcutta Football League: Champions
- Federation Cup: Runner-up
- Super Cup: Champions
- IFA Shield: Champions
- BTV Cup: Group stage
- AFC Cup: Group stage
- Top goalscorer: League: Tolgay Ozbey (18); All: Tolgay Ozbey (29)
Home colours	Away colours

The 2011–12 season is East Bengal Football Club's 5th season in the I-League, and also marks the club's 92nd season. East Bengal will seek to win their first league trophy for 7 seasons, competing in the I-League, the Federation Cup and the AFC Cup.

== Key events ==
On 26 September 2011 East Bengal defeat Prayag United in the 2011 Indian Federation Cup semi-finals 2–1 to make the final. On 18 October 2011, East Bengal defeat Salgaocar by 9-8 (penalty - sudden death) in 2011 Indian Super Cup final to win the first trophy of the season.they also won IFA Shield and Calcutta Premiere League

== Players ==
=== First-Team Squad ===
Transfer period is on-going for new season: 2011–12.

As of 4 February 2012.

Note: Flags indicate national team as defined under FIFA eligibility rules; some limited exceptions apply. Players may hold more than one non-FIFA nationality.

No.	Pos.	Nation	Player
0	FW	IND	Branco Cardozo
2	DF	IND	Raju Gaikwad
3	DF	IND	Nirmal Chettri
4	DF	NGR	Uga Samuel Okpara
5	DF	IND	Sunil Thakur
6	FW	IND	Baljit Sahni
7	MF	IND	Harmanjyot Khabra
8	DF	IND	Naoba Singh
9	MF	IND	Alvito D'Cunha
11	MF	IND	Khemtang Paite
12	MF	IND	Reisangmei Vashum
14	MF	IND	Mehtab Hossain
15	MF	IND	Sanju Pradhan (captain)
16	DF	IND	Gurwinder Singh
17	MF	IND	Sushanth Mathew
18	MF	NGR	Penn Orji
19	DF	IND	Ravinder Singh

No.	Pos.	Nation	Player
20	FW	AUS	Tolgay Ozbey
21	GK	IND	Debjit Majumder
22	MF	IND	Charan Rai
23	FW	IND	Robin Singh
24	GK	IND	Sandip Nandy
25	DF	IND	Robert Lalthalma
26	DF	IND	Sunil Kumar
28	FW	BRA	Edmilson
29	DF	IND	Saumik Dey
30	GK	IND	Gurpreet Singh Sandhu
31	GK	IND	Jayanta Paul
32	DF	IND	Abhishek Das
33	DF	IND	Saikat Saha Roy
34	MF	IND	Subodh Kumar
35	FW	IND	Budhiram Tudu
37	FW	IND	Nabin Hela
38	FW	IND	Seiminlen Doungel

- Coach: Trevor Morgan
- Asst coach: Ranjan Choudhury
- Goalkeeper coach: Atanu Bhattacharya
- Physical trainer: Kaji Juyef Islam
- Team doctor: Dr. S R Dasgupta
- Physiotherapist: Rajesh Basak
- Team manager: Swapan Ball, Gopal Ghosh

=== Transfers ===
In:

No.	Pos.	Nation	Player
-	FW	IND	Robert Lalthalma (Free from (India) Churchill Brothers)
-	FW	IND	Khemtang Paite (Free from (India) Churchill Brothers)
-	FW	IND	Charan Rai (Free from (India) Churchill Brothers)
-	FW	IND	Sunil Kumar (Free from (India) Pune)
15	FW	SCO	Alan Gow (Free from (England) Notts County)
-	FW	BRA	Edmilson Marques Pardal (Free from (India) Royal Wahingdoh)
30	GK	IND	Gurpreet Singh Sandhu (Loan return from (India) Pailan Arrows)

Out:

No.	Pos.	Nation	Player
1	GK	IND	Abhra Mondal (On loan (India) Pune)
15	FW	SCO	Alan Gow (Released)

== Stadiums ==
Kingfisher East Bengal F.C. have been using both the Salt Lake Stadium and the East Bengal Ground sense Salt Lake Stadium opened in 1984. As of today the Salt Lake Stadium is used for East Bengal's I-League, AFC Cup, and Federation Cup games. The East Bengal Ground is used for the Calcutta Football League matches.

== Kit ==
- Main Sponsor: Kingfisher (Parent Company United Breweries Group is 50% stake holder in the club).
- Co-sponsor: Tower Group
- Co-sponsor: Saradha Group
- Co-sponsor: Rose-Valley

Home	Away

== Competitions ==
=== Overall ===
Competition	First match	Last match	Final position
Federation Cup	17 September 2011	29 September 2011	Runners-up
BTV Becamex IDC Cup	7 October 2011	11 October 2011	Group Stage
Super Cup	18 October 2011		Champions
I-League	22 October 2011	5 May 2012	Runners-up
Calcutta Football League	12 November 2011	14 May 2012	Champions
IFA Shield	3 March 2012	16 March 2012	Champions
AFC Cup	6 March 2012	9 May 2012	Group Stage

=== Overview ===
Competition	Record							
Competition	Pld	W	D	L	GF	GA	GD	Win %
Federation Cup	5	3	1	1	7	6	+1	60.00
BTV Becamex IDC Cup	3	0	1	2	2	4	−2	0.00
Super Cup	1	0	1	0	0	0	+0	0.00
I-League	26	15	6	5	46	22	+24	57.69
Calcutta Football League	10	8	0	2	26	8	+18	80.00
IFA Shield	4	3	1	0	6	1	+5	75.00
AFC Cup	6	0	0	6	2	14	−12	0.00
Total	55	29	10	16	89	55	+34	52.73

Last updated: 31 May 2012
Source: Competitions

=== Federation Cup ===
Group C

Team	Pld	W	D	L	GF	GA	GD	Pts
East Bengal	3	2	1	0	4	2	+2	7
Pune	3	1	1	1	3	3	0	4
Dempo	3	1	0	2	4	4	0	3
Mohammedan	3	0	2	1	2	4	−2	2

==== Fixtures & results ====
Win Draw Loss

17 September 2011	East Bengal	1 – 1	Mohammedan SC	Kolkata
	Sanju 49'		Stanley 20'	Stadium: Salt Lake Stadium

19 September 2011	East Bengal	2 – 1	Pune F.C.	Kolkata
	Alan Gow 42'; Robin Singh 81'		Jeje Lalpekhlua 55'	Stadium: Salt Lake Stadium

21 September 2011	East Bengal	1 - 0	Dempo	Kolkata
	Robin Singh 66'			Stadium: Salt Lake Stadium

26 September 2011	East Bengal	2 - 1	Prayag United	Kolkata
6:00 pm IST	Alan Gow 37' (pen.); Khemtang Paite 81'		Snehashish Dutta 17'	Stadium: Salt Lake Stadium

29 September 2011	East Bengal	1 - 3	Salgaocar	Kolkata
	Alan Gow 26'		Chidi Edeh 5'; Francis Fernandes 17'; Ryuji Sueoka 67'	Stadium: Salt Lake Stadium

=== BECAMEX IDC Cup ===
==== Fixtures & results ====
Win Draw Loss

7 October 2011	SHB Đà Nẵng F.C. (Vietnam)	2–2	(India) East Bengal	Gò Đậu Stadium, Thu Dau Mot
	Quoc Anh 40'; Merlo Gaston 88'		Khanthang Paite 22'; Reisangmei Vashum 52'; Tolgay Ozbey (red card) 89'

9 October 2011	East Bengal (India)	0–1	(Vietnam) Sai Gon Xuan Thanh	Gò Đậu Stadium, Thu Dau Mot
	RObin Singh (yellow card); Nirmal Chettri (yellow card); Uga Okpara (yellow card)		Kim 89'

11 October 2011	East Bengal (India)	0–1	(Brazil) Matsubara	Gò Đậu Stadium, Thu Dau Mot
	Robert Lalthlamuana (yellow card) 7'; Nirmal Chettri (yellow card) 18'; Reisangmei Vashum (yellow card) 44'		Oliviera 22'

=== Super Cup ===
Last year's Federation Cup Champion East Bengal beat last year's I-League Champion Salgaocar in the Super Cup on sudden death.

==== Fixtures & results ====
Win Draw Loss

18 October 2011	Salgaocar	0 - 0 (8 - 9 p)	East Bengal	Ambedkar Stadium, New Delhi
5:45 pm IST		Report		Referee: Pratap Singh
	Penalties
	(penalty scored) Edeh; (penalty scored) Sueoka; (penalty scored) Lamare; (penalty scored) Kumar; (penalty scored) Wadoo; (penalty scored) Fernandes; (penalty scored) Sabrosa; (penalty scored) T. Singh; (penalty missed) J. Singh		Ozbey (penalty scored); Gow (penalty scored); Robin Singh (penalty scored); Pradhan (penalty scored); Mathew (penalty scored); Paite (penalty scored); Chetri (penalty scored); Okpara (penalty scored); Roy (penalty scored)

=== I League ===
==== League table ====
Pos	Team	Pld	W	D	L	GF	GA	GD	Pts	Qualification or relegation
1	Dempo (C)	26	18	3	5	59	21	+38	57	
2	East Bengal	26	15	6	5	46	22	+24	51	2013 AFC Cup Group stage (Note: East Bengal, the winner of the 2012 Indian Federation Cup, qualified for the 2013 AFC Cup.)
3	Churchill Brothers	26	14	6	6	47	28	+19	48	2013 AFC Cup Group stage (Note: Dempo refused to enter the 2013 AFC Cup, so they were replaced by Churchill Brothers.)
4	Mohun Bagan	26	13	8	5	51	32	+19	47	
5	Pune	26	13	7	6	44	34	+10	46	

Source: IndiaFooty.com
Rules for classification: 1) points; 2) goal difference; 3) number of goals scored.
(C) Champions

==== Results summary ====
Overall								Home						Away					
Pld	W	D	L	GF	GA	GD	Pts	W	D	L	GF	GA	GD	W	D	L	GF	GA	GD
25	14	5	6	42	23	+19	47	10	0	3	24	12	+12	4	5	3	18	11	+7

Last updated: 15 December 2011.
Source: Soccerway

==== Results by round ====
Round	1	2	3	4	5	6	7	8	9	10	11	12	13	14	15	16	17	18	19	20	21	22	23	24	25	26
Ground	H	A	A	H	H	A	A	A	H	A	A	A	H	A	H	H	A	H	H	A	H	H	A	H	H	A
Result	L	D	W	W	W	L	W	W	W	D	W	L	W	D	W	W	D	L	D	L	W	W	W	D	W	W
Position	10	11	6	5	3	6	4	3	3	4	2	4	2	2	2	2	2	2	2	3	2	2	2	3	2	2

Source: Soccrway
A = Away; H = Home; W = Win; D = Draw; L = Loss

==== Fixtures & results ====
Win Draw Loss

22 October 2011 1	East Bengal	0 – 1	Churchill Brothers	Salt Lake Stadium
		Summary	Opara 12'

29 October 2011 2	Prayag United	1 – 1	East Bengal	Salt Lake Stadium
	Yakubu 49'	Summary	Sahni 84'

2 November 2011 3	Mumbai	1 – 4	East Bengal	Cooperage Ground
	Kuttymani 33'	Summary	Pradhan 69'; Ozbey 71'; Vashum 82'; Gow 90'

6 November 2011 4	East Bengal	2 – 0	Shillong Lajong	Salt Lake Stadium
	Pradhan 29'; Okpara 89'	Summary

9 November 2011 5	East Bengal	3 – 1	Pune	Salt Lake Stadium
	Chettri 43'; Ozbey 64'; Gow 87'	Summary	Fernandez 45'

20 November 2011 6^{(KD)}	Mohun Bagan	1 – 0	East Bengal	Salt Lake Stadium
	Okolie 21' (pen.)	Summary

23 November 2011 7	HAL	1 – 8	East Bengal	Bangalore Football Stadium
	Hamza 17' (pen.)	Summary	Singh 7'; Okpara 26', 37'; Ozbey 49', 57', 71', 86'; Sahni 74'

5 December 2011 8	Sporting Clube de Goa	0 – 1	East Bengal	Fatorda Stadium
		Summary	Ozbey 25'

15 December 2011 9	East Bengal	2 – 1	Dempo	Salt Lake Stadium
	Orji 31'; Ozbey 42'	Summary	Miranda 11'

18 December 2011 10	Pailan Arrows	0 – 0	East Bengal	Salt Lake Stadium
		Summary

23 December 2011 11	Chirag United Kerala	0 – 2	East Bengal	Kaloor International Stadium
		Summary	Orji 51'; Ozbey 90+7'

29 December 2011 12	Salgaocar	4 – 0	East Bengal	Fatorda Stadium
	Fernandes 24'; Sueoka 67'; Singh 85'; Chettri 90+3' (o.g.)	Summary

2 January 2012 13	East Bengal	2 – 1	Air India	Salt Lake Stadium
	Orji 25', 74'	Summary	Henry 52'

14 January 2012 14	Pune	0 – 0	East Bengal	Balewadi Sports Complex
		Summary

16 January 2012 15	East Bengal	4 - 1	Pailan Arrows	Salt Lake Stadium
	Orji 27'; Ozbey 31', 76'; Lalthalma 57'	Summary	Maulingkar 60'

20 January 2012 16	East Bengal	2 - 0	HAL	Salt Lake Stadium
	Dey 66'; Orji 89'	Summary

26 January 2012 17	Churchill Brothers	1 - 1	East Bengal	Churchill Braz Alemao
	Opara 8'	Summary	Ozbey 53'

31 January 2012 18	East Bengal	0 - 1	Prayag United	Salt Lake Stadium
		Summary	Vincent 90+3'

4 February 2012 19^{(KD)}	East Bengal	1 - 1	Mohun Bagan	Salt Lake Stadium
	Singh 32'	Summary	Okolie 47'

10 February 2012 20	Shillong Lajong	2 - 1	East Bengal	Khuman Lampak Main Stadium
	Menyongar 12'; Lyngdoh 16'	Summary	Ozbey 4'

24 March 2012 21	East Bengal	1 - 0	Salgaocar	Salt Lake Stadium
	Ozbey 54'	Summary

30 March 2012 22	East Bengal	3 - 1	Mumbai	Salt Lake Stadium
	Ozbey 22' (pen.); R.Singh 25'; Edmilson 87'	Summary	Rodrigues 5'

16 April 2012 25	East Bengal	4 - 3	Chirag United Kerala	Salt Lake Stadium
	Orji 24'; Ozbey 33', 54'; Singh 77'	Summary	Sunday 37', 41', 48'

20 April 2012 23	Dempo	0 - 0	East Bengal	Fatorda Stadium
		Summary

30 April 2012 24	East Bengal	3 - 0	Sporting Clube de Goa	Salt Lake Stadium
	Pradhan 76'; Ozbey 77'; Singh 82' (pen.)	Summary

5 May 2012 26	Air India	0 - 1	East Bengal	Cooperage Ground
		Summary	Edmilson 27'

=== Calcutta Football League ===
==== Fixtures & results ====
Win Draw Loss

12 November 2011 1	East Bengal	3–1	George Telegraph	Kolkata
	Ravinder Singh 8'; Sunil Thakur 40'; Robin Singh 45+1'	Report	Orok Essien 90+2'	Stadium: East Bengal Ground

15 November 2011 2	East Bengal	4–0	BNR	Kolkata
	Robin Singh 19'; Seiminlen Doungel 56'; Saumik Dey 58'; Tolgay Ozbey 65'	Report		Stadium: Salt Lake Stadium

27 November 2011 3	East Bengal	2–1	Police A.C.	Kolkata
	Saumik Dey 70'; Seiminlen Doungel 73'	Report	Emmanuel 75'	Stadium: East Bengal Ground

1 December 2011 4	East Bengal	1–0	Southern Samity	Kolkata
	Saumik Dey 31'	Report		Stadium: East Bengal Ground

9 December 2011 5	East Bengal	3–0	Prayag United	Kolkata
	Tolgay Ozbey 12', 69'; Seiminlen Doungel 81'	Report		Stadium: Salt Lake Stadium

12 December 2011 6	East Bengal	2–0	Peerless	Kolkata
	Subodh Kumar 23'; Seiminlen Doungel 42'	Report		Stadium: East Bengal Ground

7 January 2012 7	East Bengal	0–2	Mohun Bagan	Kolkata
		Report	Odafa Onyeka Okolie 22'; Manish Bhargav 28'	Stadium: Salt Lake Stadium; Referee: Ravshan Irmatov

10 January 2012 8	East Bengal	1–4	Aryan	Kolkata
	Tolgay Ozbey 43'	Report	Charles 60', 68', 84'; Gopal 66'	Stadium: East Bengal Ground

27 March 2012 9	East Bengal	4–0	Tollygunge Agragami	Kolkata
	Seiminlen Doungel 32'; Nirmal Chettri 53'; Tolgay Ozbey 67'; Budhiram Tudu 90+2'	Report		Stadium: Salt Lake Stadium

14 May 2012 10	East Bengal	6–0	Mohammedan Sporting	Kolkata
	Tolgay Ozbey 13', 31', 40', 56'; Seiminlen Doungel 65'; Penn Orji 77'	Report		Stadium: Salt Lake Stadium

=== IFA Shield ===
==== Fixtures & results ====
Win Draw Loss

3 March 2013 Group stage	East Bengal	2–1	Bhawanipore	Kolkata
	Robin Singh 5', 52'	Report	Biswajit Biswas 16'	Stadium: Salt Lake Stadium; Referee: Ajit Dutta

10 March 2013 Group stage	East Bengal	3–0	Shillong Lajong	Kolkata
	Tolgay Ozbey 17'; Gurwinder Singh 75'; Robin Singh 90'	Report		Stadium: Salt Lake Stadium

13 March 2013 Semi Final	East Bengal	1–0	Pailan Arrows	Kolkata
	Tolgay Ozbey 21'	Report		Stadium: Salt Lake Stadium

16 March 2012 Final	East Bengal	0–0 (a.e.t.) (4–2 p)	Prayag United	Kolkata
14:30 IST		Report		Stadium: Salt Lake Stadium; Attendance: 30,000 (est.); Referee: Santosh Kumar
	Penalties
	Ozbey (penalty scored); Khanthang Paite (penalty scored); Robin Singh (penalty scored); Subodh Kumar (penalty scored)		(penalty missed) James Singh; (penalty missed) Bello Razaq; (penalty scored) Jayanta Sen; (penalty scored) Yusif Yakubu

=== AFC Cup ===
==== Group stage ====
The group were drawn on 6 December 2011 in (Kuala Lumpur, Malaysia)

Team	Pld	W	D	L	GF	GA	GD	Pts	ERB	KAZ	ORU	KEB
(Iraq) Erbil	6	4	2	0	11	5	+6	14		1–1	2–1	2–0
(Kuwait) Kazma	6	3	2	1	10	6	+4	11	1–2		1–1	3–0
(Yemen) Al-Oruba	6	2	2	2	10	8	+2	8	2–2	1–2		4–1
(India) East Bengal	6	0	0	6	2	14	−12	0	0–2	1–2	0–1	

Source: RSSSF
Legend: Blue = home team win; Yellow = draw; Red = away team win.

==== Fixtures & results ====
Win Draw Loss

6 March 2012 1	East Bengal (India)	0 – 1	(Yemen) Al-Oruba	Salt Lake Stadium, Kolkata
15:00 UTC+05:30		Report; Summary	Adisa 45+1' (pen.)	Attendance: 10,000; Referee: Tayeb Hasan Shamsuzzaman (Bangladesh)

20 March 2012 2	Kazma (Kuwait)	3 – 0	(India) East Bengal	Al-Sadaqua Walsalam Stadium, Kuwait City
18:30 UTC+03:00	Nasser 38'; Al Wuhaib 44'; Jammeh 58'	Report		Attendance: 1,000; Referee: Marai Al Awaji (Saudi Arabia)

4 April 2012 3	East Bengal (India)	0 – 2	(Iraq) Arbil	Salt Lake Stadium
15:15 UTC+05:30		Summary	Radhi 75'; Al Hussain 90'	Attendance: 10,000; Referee: Leow Thiam Hoe (Singapore)

10 April 2012 4	Arbil (Iraq)	2 – 0	(India) East Bengal	Franso Hariri Stadium
18:00 UTC+03:00	Al Hussain 45+1' (pen.), 47' (pen.)	Summary		Attendance: 5,000; Referee: Ali Sabbagh (Lebanon)

25 April 2012 5	Al-Oruba (Yemen)	4 – 1	(India) East Bengal	Prince Mohammed Stadium, Zarqa (Jordan)^{2}
16:00 UTC+03:00	Naggar 6'; Alao 33'; Sharyan 58'; Al-Gabr 70'	Summary	Edmilson 79'	Attendance: 600; Referee: Khurram Shahzad (Pakistan)

9 May 2012 6	East Bengal (India)	1 – 2	(Kuwait) Kazma	Salt Lake Stadium
15:30 UTC+05:30	Edmilson 18'; Saha (red card) 34'	Summary	Ismail 7'; Al Azmi 90'

Notes

- Note 2: Due to the political crisis in Yemen, the AFC requested Yemeni clubs to play their home matches at neutral venues.

== Statistics ==
=== Appearances ===
Players with no appearances are not included in the list.

Appearances for East Bengal in 2011–12 season
No.	Pos.	Nat.	Name	CFL		I League		Fed Cup		BTV Cup		Super Cup		IFA Shield		AFC Cup		Total	
No.	Pos.	Nat.	Name	Apps	Starts	Apps	Starts	Apps	Starts	Apps	Starts	Apps	Starts	Apps	Starts	Apps	Starts	Apps	Starts
Goalkeepers
30	GK	(India)	Gurpreet Singh Sandhu			16	16					1	1	3	3	4	4	24	24
24	GK	(India)	Sandip Nandy	6	6	10	10	5	5	0	0			1	1	2	2	24	24
26	GK	(India)	Abhra Mondal							3	3							3	3
21	GK	(India)	Debjit Majumder	3	3													3	3
31	GK	(India)	Jayanta Pal	1	1	0	0					0	0					1	1
Defenders
4	DF	(Nigeria)	Uga Okpara	5	4	24	24	5	5	3	3	1	1	4	4	5	5	47	46
3	DF	(India)	Nirmal Chhetri	3	3	17	17	2	2	3	3	1	1			4	4	30	30
25	DF	(India)	Robert Lalthalmuana	4	4	14	13	2	1	3	3	1	1	2	0	4	3	30	25
16	DF	(India)	Gurwinder Singh	6	6	14	13			0	0	0	0	3	3	5	5	28	27
29	DF	(India)	Soumik Dey	8	6	13	13	4	4	0	0	0	0	3	3	4	3	32	29
8	DF	(India)	Naoba Singh	1	1	11	10	5	4	3	3	0	0			1	1	21	19
2	DF	(India)	Raju Gaikwad	2	2	5	4	3	3	0	0	0	0			2	2	12	11
33	DF	(India)	Saikat Saha Roy	6	6	4	4					1	1	3	3	2	1	16	15
19	DF	(India)	Ravinder Singh	6	4	3	0					1	0	1	1	0	0	11	5
26	DF	(India)	Sunil Thakur	5	5	1	1											6	6
5	DF	(India)	Sunil Kumar	3	3													3	3
	DF	(India)	Abhishek Das					1	1			0	0					1	1
Midfielders
18	MF	(Nigeria)	Penn Orji	7	3	23	22	5	4	3	3	1	1	4	4	5	5	48	42
15	MF	(India)	Sanju Pradhan	6	4	22	15	5	2	2	1	1	0	4	2	6	5	46	29
7	MF	(India)	Harmanjot Khabra	5	4	21	20	5	5	1	1			2	2	3	3	37	35
12	MF	(India)	Reisengmei Vashum	3	2	20	19	4	4	3	3	1	1			0	0	31	29
14	MF	(India)	Mehtab Hossain	6	3	16	14	4	4					1	1	4	2	31	24
11	MF	(India)	Khantang Paite	3	2	13	7	4	0	3	3	1	1	4	3	3	1	31	17
17	MF	(India)	Sushant Matthews	2	2	10	8			3	2	1	1	4	4	1	1	21	18
34	MF	(India)	Subodh Kumar	5	4	6	4			1	0	0	0	3	2	3	3	18	13
	MF	(India)	Charan Rai	4	4							0	0			1	0	5	4
9	MF	(India)	Alvito D'Cunha	0	0									2	0	0	0	2	0
	MF	(India)	Sourav Roy	1	0													1	0
Forwards
20	FW	(Australia)	Tolgay Ozbey	8	7	25	24	5	3	1	1	1	0	4	4	5	4	49	43
23	FW	(India)	Robin Singh	7	5	15	13	3	3	2	2	1	1	4	4	6	5	38	33
6	FW	(India)	Baljit Singh Saini	4	3	15	7	3	2	0	0	0	0	3	0	5	2	30	14
28	FW	(Brazil)	Edmilson Marques Pardal			10	3									6	4	16	7
10	FW	(Scotland)	Alan Gow	1	1	6	3	4	3	2	2	1	1					14	10
38	FW	(India)	Semilen Doungel	10	10	4	2							1	1	1	1	16	14
35	FW	(India)	Budhiram Tudu	4	2													4	2

=== Goal scorers ===
Goals for East Bengal in 2011–12 season
Rank	No.	Pos.	Nat.	Name	CFL	I League	Fed Cup	BTV Cup	Super Cup	IFA Shield	AFC Cup	Total
1	20	FW	(Australia)	Tolgay Ozbey	9	18	0	0	0	2	0	29
2	23	FW	(India)	Robin Singh	2	5	2	0	0	3	0	12
3	18	MF	(Nigeria)	Penn Orji	1	7	0	0	0	0	0	8
4	38	FW	(India)	Semilen Doungel	6	0				0	0	6
5	10	FW	(Scotland)	Alan Gow	0	2	3	0	0			5
6	15	MF	(India)	Sanju Pradhan	0	3	1	0	0	0	0	4
6	28	FW	(Brazil)	Edmilson Marques Pardal		2					2	4
6	29	DF	(India)	Soumik Dey	3	1	0	0	0	0	0	4
9	4	DF	(Nigeria)	Uga Okpara	0	3	0	0	0	0	0	3
10	3	DF	(India)	Nirmal Chhetri	1	1	0	0	0	0	0	2
10	6	FW	(India)	Baljit Singh Saini	0	2	0	0	0	0	0	2
10	11	MF	(India)	Khantang Paite	0	0	1	1	0	0	0	2
10	12	MF	(India)	Reisengmei Vashum	0	1	0	1	0	0	0	2
14	16	DF	(India)	Gurwinder Singh	0	0		0	0	1		1
14	19	DF	(India)	Ravinder Singh	1	0	0	0	0	0	0	1
14	25	DF	(India)	Robert Lalthalmuana	0	1	0	0	0	0	0	1
14	26	DF	(India)	Sunil Thakur	1	0				0	0	1
14	34	MF	(India)	Subodh Kumar	1	0				0	0	1
14	35	FW	(India)	Budhiram Tudu	1							1
Own Goals					0	0	0	0	0	0	0	1
Total					26	46	7	2	0	6	2	89
