= 2010–11 East Bengal FC season =

Indian football club season

East Bengal
2010–11 season
- President: Dr Pranab Dasgupta
- Head-Coach: (England) Trevor Morgan
- Ground: Salt Lake Stadium; Barasat Stadium; East Bengal Ground
- I-League: Runners-up
- Calcutta Football League: Champions
- Federation Cup: Champions
- Durand Cup: Semi-Finals
- Platinum Jubilee Cup: Champions
- IFA Shield: Group Stage
- Super Cup: Runners-up
- AFC Cup: Group Stage
- Top goalscorer: League: Tolgay Ozbey (17); All: Tolgay Ozbey (37)
Home colours	Away colours

The 2010–11 season is East Bengal Football Club's 4th season in the I-League, and also marks the club's 91st season. East Bengal will seek to win their first league trophy for 6 seasons, competing in the I-League, the Federation Cup and the AFC Cup.

== Players ==
=== Current squad ===
For the 2010–11 season.
Note: Flags indicate national team as defined under FIFA eligibility rules; some limited exceptions apply. Players may hold more than one non-FIFA nationality.

No.	Pos.	Nation	Player
1	GK	IND	Abhra Mondal
22	GK	IND	Naseem Akhtar
21	GK	IND	Sandip Nandy
31	GK	IND	Jayanta Pal
2	DF	IND	Ravinder Singh
29	DF	IND	Saumik Dey [Captain]
26	DF	IND	Mehrajuddin Wadoo
37	DF	IND	Rajib Ghosh
3	DF	IND	Nirmal Chettri
5	DF	IND	Sunil Kumar Thakur
34	DF	IND	Sukamal Santra
16	DF	IND	Gurwinder Singh
33	DF	IND	Saikat Saha Roy
8	DF	IND	Noaba Singh
4	DF	NGR	Uga Samuel Okpara
19	DF	IND	Syed Rahim Nabi
7	MF	IND	Harmanjyot Singh Khabra
-	MF	IND	Biswarup Deb

No.	Pos.	Nation	Player
9	MF	IND	Alvito D'Cunha
24	MF	IND	Aseem Koraliyadan
32	MF	IND	Lalchuan Awma
14	MF	IND	Mehtab Hossain
12	MF	IND	Reisangmei Vashum
11	MF	IND	Sanju Pradhan
17	MF	IND	Sushanth Mathew
42	MF	IND	Bishwajit Natta
18	MF	NGR	Penn Orji
23	FW	IND	Robin Singh
25	FW	IND	Bikash Narjinary (Currently on loan to Southern Samity)
20	FW	AUS	Tolgay Ozbey
6	FW	IND	Baljit Sahni

- Coach: Trevor Morgan
- Asst coach: Tushar Rakshit
- Goalkeeper coach: Atanu Bhattacharya
- Team doctor: Dr. S R Dasgupta
- Team manager: Swapan Ball, Gopal Ghosh

=== Transfers ===
In:

No.	Pos.	Nation	Player
-	FW	IND	Reisangmei Vashum (Free from (India) Churchill Brothers)
-	DF	IND	Sushanth Mathew (Free from (India) Mahindra United)
-	DF	IND	Naoba Singh (Free from (India) Churchill Brothers)
-	MF	IND	Penn Orji (Free from (India) JCT)
-	FW	BRA	Alexandro da Silva Santos (Free from (Hong Kong) Citizen AA)

Out:

No.	Pos.	Nation	Player
15	FW	IND	Baichung Bhutia (On loan (India) United Sikkim FC)
35	FW	IND	Budhiram Tudu (On loan (India) United Sikkim FC)
27	FW	IND	Bengaicho Beokhokhei Singh (On loan (India) United Sikkim FC)
-	GK	IND	Gurpreet Singh Sandhu (On loan (India) Pailan Arrows)
-	FW	BRA	Alexandro da Silva Santos (Released)

== Stadiums ==
East Bengal F.C. have been using both the Salt Lake Stadium and the East Bengal Ground sense Salt Lake Stadium opened in 1984. As of today the Salt Lake Stadium is used for East Bengal's I-League, AFC Cup, and Federation Cup games. The East Bengal Ground is used for the Calcutta Football League matches.

== Kit ==
- Main Sponsor: Kingfisher (Parent Company United Breweries Group is 50% stake holder in the club).
- Co-sponsor: Tower Group
- Co-sponsor: Saradha Group

Home	Away

== Competitions ==
=== Overall ===
Competition	First match	Last match	Final position
Calcutta Football League	31 August 2010	14 December 2010	Champions
Federation Cup	21 September 2010	2 October 2010	Champions
Durand Cup	30 October 2010	4 November 2010	Semi-Finals
Platinum Jubilee Cup	12 November 2010	14 November 2010	Champions
Super Cup	1 December 2010		Runners-up
I-League	4 December 2010	1 June 2011	Runners-up
IFA Shield	12 March 2011	25 March 2011	Group-Stage
AFC Cup	2 March 2011	10 May 2011	Group Stage

=== Overview ===
Competition	Record							
Competition	Pld	W	D	L	GF	GA	GD	Win %
Calcutta Football League	16	14	1	1	49	9	+40	87.50
Federation Cup	5	5	0	0	8	2	+6	100.00
Platinum Jubilee Cup	2	1	1	0	4	3	+1	50.00
Durand Cup	3	2	0	1	6	3	+3	66.67
Super Cup	1	0	0	1	1	3	−2	0.00
I-League	26	15	6	5	44	21	+23	57.69
IFA Shield	4	1	1	2	5	5	+0	25.00
AFC Cup	6	0	3	3	9	17	−8	0.00
Total	63	38	12	13	126	63	+63	60.32

Last updated: 1 June 2011
Source: Competitions

=== Calcutta Football League ===
==== Fixtures & results ====
Win Draw Loss

31 August 2010 1	East Bengal	5–0	Mohammedan AC	Kolkata
	Budhiram Tudu 3'; Penn Orji 14'; Bikash Narzinary 39', 64', 66'	Report		Stadium: East Bengal Ground; Man of the Match: Bikash Narzinary (East Bengal)

3 September 2010 2	East Bengal	2–0	WB Police	Kolkata
	Penn Orji 78', 88'	Report		Stadium: Salt Lake Stadium; Man of the Match: Penn Orji (East Bengal)

9 September 2010 3	East Bengal	4–1	BNR	Kolkata
	Ekene Ikenwa 4', 39'; Reisangmei Vashum 34'; Mehtab Hossain 58'	Report	Michael 6'	Stadium: East Bengal Ground; Man of the Match: Naoba Singh (East Bengal)

13 September 2010 4	East Bengal	5–0	Mohammedan Sporting	Kolkata
	Harmanjot Khabra 6'; Penn Orji (yellow card) 33' (yellow-red card) 34'; Robin Singh 47', 50'; Saumik Dey 58'; Tolgay Ozbey 76'	Report		Stadium: Salt Lake Stadium; Referee: Tushar Kanti Guha; Man of the Match: Mehtab Hossain (East Bengal)

16 September 2010 5	East Bengal	3–0	Peerless	Kolkata
	Ekene Ikenwa 8'; Harmanjot Khabra 36'; Nirmal Chettri 87'	Report		Stadium: East Bengal Ground; Man of the Match: Reisangmei Vashum (East Bengal)

7 October 2010 6	East Bengal	2–0	Calcutta Port Trust	Kolkata
	Saikat Saha Roy 56'; Tolgay Ozbey 67'	Report		Stadium: Salt Lake Stadium; Man of the Match: Saikat Saha Roy (East Bengal)

9 October 2010 7	East Bengal	6–0	Eastern Railway	Kolkata
	Ekene Ikenwa 3', 36', 45', 79' (pen.); Penn Orji 90', 90+2'	Report		Stadium: Salt Lake Stadium; Man of the Match: Ekene Ikenwa (East Bengal)

12 October 2010 8	East Bengal	3–1	George Telegraph	Kolkata
	Budhiram Tudu 10'; Sushanth Mathew 12'; Penn Orji 57'	Report	Deepak Dolui 47'	Stadium: Salt Lake Stadium; Man of the Match: Penn Orji (East Bengal)

20 October 2010 9	East Bengal	1–0	Tollygunge Agragami	Kolkata
	Penn Orji 25'	Report		Stadium: East Bengal Ground; Man of the Match: Nasibul Haq (Tollygunge Agragami)

23 October 2010 10	East Bengal	5–2	Kalighat MS	Kolkata
	Ekene Ikenwa 39'; Robin Singh 43' (pen.), 45'; Tolgay Ozbey 50', 84'	Report	Prasenjit Neogi 6'; Christopher Chizoba 58' (pen.)	Stadium: East Bengal Ground; Man of the Match: Christopher Chizoba (Kalighat M)

25 October 2010 11	East Bengal	3–0	Railway FC	Kolkata
	Tolgay Ozbey 4'; Penn Orji 47'; Budhiram Tudu 64'	Report		Stadium: East Bengal Ground; Man of the Match: Penn Orji (East Bengal)

18 November 2010 12	East Bengal	3–0	Kalighat Club	Kolkata
	Tolgay Ozbey 25', 31'; Alvito D'Cunha 87'	Report		Stadium: Salt Lake Stadium; Man of the Match: Tolgay Ozbey (East Bengal)

21 November 2010 13	East Bengal	1–1	Chirag United	Kolkata
	Tolgay Ozbey 8'	Report	Arnab Mondal 26'	Stadium: Salt Lake Stadium; Man of the Match: Arnab Mondal (Chirag United)

23 November 2010 14	East Bengal	3–2	Southern Samity	Kolkata
	Budhiram Tudu 40'; Mehtab Hossain 71'; Penn Orji 90+3'	Report	Edmilson Marques Pardal 46'; Marcos Pereira 56'	Stadium: Salt Lake Stadium; Man of the Match: Mehtab Hossain (East Bengal)

26 November 2010 15	East Bengal	2–0	Mohun Bagan	Kolkata
	Robin Singh 12', 59'	Report		Stadium: Salt Lake Stadium; Attendance: 100,000 (est.); Referee: Gamini Nivon Roesh; Man of the Match: Penn Orji (East Bengal)

14 December 2010 16	East Bengal	1–2	Aryan	Kolkata
	Rajib Ghosh 5'	Report	Snehasish Dutta 60', 91'	Stadium: East Bengal Ground; Man of the Match: Snehasish Dutta (Aryan)

=== Federation Cup ===
Group A

Team	Pld	W	D	L	GF	GA	GD	Pts
East Bengal	3	3	0	0	6	2	+4	9
HAL SC	3	1	1	1	2	2	0	4
Pune	3	1	0	2	2	2	0	3
Air India	3	0	1	2	1	5	−4	1

==== Fixtures & results ====
Win Draw Loss

21 September 2010 Group Stage	East Bengal	3–1	Air India	Cuttack
	Tolgay Ozbey 25', 55' (pen.); Robin Singh 63'	Report	Bijith Setty 89' (pen.)	Stadium: Barabati Stadium

23 September 2010 Group Stage	East Bengal	2–1	HAL	Cuttack
	Penn Orji 13'; Tolgay Ozbey 33'	Report	Hamza 9'; Sreekant (yellow card) 55' (yellow-red card) 65'	Stadium: Barabati Stadium

25 September 2010 Group Stage	East Bengal	1–0	Pune	Cuttack
	Penn Orji 67'	Report		Stadium: Barabati Stadium

29 September 2010 Semi Final	East Bengal	1–0	Churchill Brothers	Cuttack
	Tolgay Ozbey 11' (penalty missed) 22'	Report		Stadium: Barabati Stadium

2 October 2010 Final^{(KD)}	East Bengal	1–0	Mohun Bagan	Cuttack
	Tolgay Ozbey (penalty missed) 21'; Reisangmei Vashum 53'	Report	Muritala Ali (yellow card) 70' (yellow-red card) 88'	Stadium: Barabati Stadium; Referee: Dinesh Nair

=== Durand Cup ===
==== Fixtures & results ====
Win Draw Loss

30 October 2010 Group Stage	East Bengal	4–1	Air India	Delhi
	Tolgay Ozbey 42', 71'; Ekene Ikenwa 89'; Penn Orji 90+2'	Report	Yusuf Tijani 13'	Stadium: Ambedkar Stadium

1 November 2010 Group Stage	East Bengal	2–1	Salgaocar	Delhi
	Sanju Pradhan 62' (pen.); Tolgay Ozbey 68'	Report	Yusif Yakubu 29'	Stadium: Ambedkar Stadium

4 November 2010 Semi Final	East Bengal	0–1	Chirag United	Delhi
		Report	Mohammed Rafique 87'	Stadium: Ambedkar Stadium

=== Platinum Jubilee Cup ===
==== Fixtures & results ====
Win Draw Loss

12 November 2010 Semi Final	East Bengal	1–0	Mohammedan Sporting	Kolkata
	Sanju Pradhan 92' (pen.)	Report		Stadium: Salt Lake Stadium; Referee: Rathin Mukherjee

14 November 2010 Final	East Bengal	3–3 (a.e.t.) (3–2 p)	Mohun Bagan	Kolkata
	Alvito D'Cunha 45+1'; Robin Singh 76', 101'	Report	Satish Kumar 55'; Ashim Biswas 67'; Harpreet Singh 115'	Stadium: Salt Lake Stadium; Referee: Barun Saha; Man of the Match: Robin Singh (East Bengal)
	Penalties
	Sanju Pradhan (penalty scored); Robin Singh (penalty scored); Sushanth Mathew (penalty scored); Ravinder Singh (penalty missed); Biswajit Natta (penalty missed)		(penalty missed) Souvik Chakrabarti; (penalty missed) Snehasish Chakraborty; (penalty scored) Rahul Kumar; (penalty scored) Dipendu Duwary; (penalty missed) Gouranga Dutta

=== Super Cup ===
Last year's Federation Cup Champion East Bengal faced last year's I-League Champion Dempo in the Super Cup.

==== Fixtures & results ====
Win Draw Loss

1 December 2010	Dempo	3–1	East Bengal	Gurgaon
	Ranti Martins 34', 38', 50'	Report	Penn Orji 23'	Stadium: Tau Devi Lal Stadium

=== I League ===
==== League table ====
Pos	Team	Pld	W	D	L	GF	GA	GD	Pts	Qualification or relegation
1	Salgaocar (C)	26	18	2	6	58	27	+31	56	2012 AFC Cup Group stage
2	East Bengal	26	15	6	5	44	21	+23	51	2012 AFC Cup Group stage (Note: Since Salgaocar SC also won the 2011 Indian Federation Cup, East Bengal qualified for the 2012 AFC Cup as 2010–11 I-League runners-up.)
3	Dempo	26	15	5	6	63	33	+30	50	
4	Churchill Brothers	26	14	8	4	57	31	+26	50	
5	Pune	26	9	9	8	32	27	+5	36	

Source: IndiaFooty.com
Rules for classification: 1) points; 2) goal difference; 3) number of goals scored.
(C) Champions

==== Results summary ====
Overall								Home						Away					
Pld	W	D	L	GF	GA	GD	Pts	W	D	L	GF	GA	GD	W	D	L	GF	GA	GD
26	15	6	5	44	21	+23	51	11	1	1	30	9	+21	4	5	4	14	12	+2

Last updated: 1 June 2011.
Source: Soccerway

==== Fixtures & results ====
Win Draw Loss

4 December 2010 1	East Bengal	1–0	ONGC	Kolkata
	Tolgay Ozbey 88'	Report		Stadium: Salt Lake Stadium

8 December 2010 2	Dempo	0–1	East Bengal	Margao
		Report	Tolgay Ozbey 53'	Stadium: Fatorda Stadium

12 December 2010 3	East Bengal	4–0	AIFF XI	Kolkata
	Robin Singh 49', 71'; Penn Orji 66'; Tolgay Ozbey 79'	Report		Stadium: Salt Lake Stadium

17 December 2010 4	JCT	0–1	East Bengal	Ludhiana
		Report	Uga Okpara 37'	Stadium: Guru Nanak Stadium

22 December 2010 5	East Bengal	1–0	Salgaocar	Kolkata
	Tolgay Ozbey 60'	Report		Stadium: Salt Lake Stadium

29 December 2010 6	East Bengal	6–1	Air India	Kolkata
	Saumik Dey 10'; Robin Singh 34', 90'; Tolgay Ozbey 43', 48'; Mehtab Hossain 90'	Report	E. Mputu 55'	Stadium: Salt Lake Stadium

4 January 2011 7	Mumbai	1–1	East Bengal	Kolhapur
	Henry Ezeh 75'	Report	Uga Okpara 18'	Stadium: Rajarshi Shahu Stadium

8 January 2011 8	East Bengal	1–0	Pune	Kolkata
	Tolgay Ozbey 63'	Report		Stadium: Salt Lake Stadium

14 January 2011 9	Chirag United	0–0	East Bengal	Kolkata
		Report		Stadium: Salt Lake Stadium

18 January 2011 10	Viva Kerala	0–1	East Bengal	Kozhikode
		Report	Tolgay Ozbey 42'	Stadium: EMS Stadium

22 January 2011 11	East Bengal	1–0	HAL	Kolkata
	Penn Orji 35'	Report		Stadium: Salt Lake Stadium

29 January 2011 12	East Bengal	2–2	Churchill Brothers	Kolkata
	Sanju Pradhan 51' (pen.); Tolgay Ozbey 70'	Report	Kayne Vincent 68', 90'	Stadium: Salt Lake Stadium

6 February 2011 13	Mohun Bagan	1–1	East Bengal	Kolkata
	Jose Ramirez Barreto 29'	Report	Sanju Pradhan 8' (pen.)	Stadium: Salt Lake Stadium

12 February 2011 14	ONGC	1–0	East Bengal	Kolhapur
	Badmus Babatunde 53'	Report		Stadium: Rajarshi Shahu Stadium

26 February 2011 15	AIFF XI	1–1	East Bengal	Gurgaon
	Milan Singh 8'	Report	Reisangmei Vashum 19'	Stadium: Tau Devi Lal Stadium

6 March 2011 16	East Bengal	1–2	Mumbai	Kolkata
	Biswarup Dey 90'	Report	Henry Ezeh 11'; Ebi Sukore 24'	Stadium: Salt Lake Stadium

9 March 2011 17	East Bengal	3–0	JCT	Kolkata
	Baljit Sahni 28', 73'; Robin Singh 76'	Report		Stadium: Salt Lake Stadium

4 April 2011 18	Air India	0–3	East Bengal	Kolhapur
		Report	Tolgay Ozbey 72', 89', 90+1'	Stadium: Rajarshi Shahu Stadium

9 April 2011 19	East Bengal	2–1	Mohun Bagan	Kolkata
	Tolgay Ozbey 5'; Baljit Sahni 54'	Report	Surkumar Singh 48'	Stadium: Salt Lake Stadium

18 April 2011 20	Pune	2–1	East Bengal	Pune
	Mandjou Keita 32'; Shanmugam Venkatesh 64'	Report	Uga Okpara 18'	Stadium: Balewadi Stadium

22 April 2011 21	East Bengal	3–0	Viva Kerala	Kolkata
	Syed Rahim Nabi 17'; Penn Orji 19'; Sushil Kumar Singh 41'	Report		Stadium: Salt Lake Stadium

15 May 2011 22	East Bengal	3–2	Dempo	Kolkata
	Baljit Sahni 47'; Tolgay Ozbey 50', 57'	Report	Ranti Martins 7'; Roberto Mendes Silva 90' (pen.)	Stadium: Salt Lake Stadium

19 May 2011 23	Salgaocar	3–2	East Bengal	Margao
	Rino Anto 33'; Cajetan Fernandes 79'; Yusif Yakubu 85'	Report	Tolgay Ozbey 10' (pen.); Baljit Sahni 16'	Stadium: Fatorda Stadium

22 May 2011 24	Churchill Brothers	2–1	East Bengal	Margao
	Odafa Onyeka Okolie 30', 58'	Report	Baljit Sahni 78'	Stadium: Fatorda Stadium

28 May 2011 25	HAL	1–1	East Bengal	Bangaluru
	Xavier Vijay Kumar 84'	Report	Robin Singh 76'	Stadium: Bangalore Football Stadium

1 June 2011 26	East Bengal	2–1	Chirag United	Kolkata
	Sushanth Mathew 19'; Tolgay Ozbey 38'	Report	Sunil Chhetri 65'	Stadium: Salt Lake Stadium

=== IFA Shield ===
==== Fixtures & results ====
Win Draw Loss

12 March 2011 Group Stage	East Bengal	1–2	Southern Samity	Kolkata
	Ravinder Singh 2'	Report	Edmilson Marques Pardal 43', 90+2'	Stadium: Salt Lake Stadium

20 March 2011 Group Stage	East Bengal	1–1	Mohammedan Sporting	Kolkata
	Baljit Sahni 86'	Report	Christopher Chizoba 63' (pen.)	Stadium: Salt Lake Stadium

23 March 2011 Group Stage	East Bengal	0–1	Churchill Brothers	Kolkata
		Report	Bineesh Balan 60'	Stadium: Salt Lake Stadium

25 March 2011 Group Stage	East Bengal	3–1	Shandong Luneng	Kolkata
	Baljit Sahni 41'; Reisangmei Vashum 77'; Ravinder Singh 90+3'	Report	Mi-Hao-Ling 22'	Stadium: Salt Lake Stadium

=== AFC Cup ===
==== Group stage ====
Team	Pld	W	D	L	GF	GA	GD	Pts	CHO	PJY	SCA	KEB
(Thailand) Chonburi	6	4	1	1	18	8	+10	13		4–1	3–0	4–0
(Indonesia) Persipura Jayapura	6	3	2	1	14	9	+5	11	3–0		4–2	4–1
(Hong Kong) South China	6	1	2	3	7	14	−7	5	0–3	1–1		1–0
(India) Kingfisher East Bengal	6	0	3	3	9	17	−8	3	4–4	1–1	3–3	

Source: RSSSF
Legend: Blue = home team win; Yellow = draw; Red = away team win.

==== Fixtures & results ====
Win Draw Loss

2 March 2011 Group Stage	East Bengal (India)	4–4	(Thailand) Chonburi	Salt Lake Stadium, Kolkata
17:00 UTC+05:30	Ozbey 8', 22'; Sahni 74'; R. Singh 82' (pen.)	Report	Pipob 29', 47'; Adul 43'; Ekaphan 53'	Attendance: 2,000; Referee: Hettikamkanamge Perera (Sri Lanka)

16 March 2011 Group Stage	Persipura Jayapura (Indonesia)	4–1	(India) East Bengal	Gelora Bung Karno Stadium, Jakarta
16:00 UTC+07:00	Bonai 16'; B. Solossa 19'; Bonsapia 62'; Mandowen 90+3'	Report	Ozbey 22'	Attendance: 700; Referee: Vo Minh Tri (Vietnam)

13 April 2011 Group Stage	South China (Hong Kong)	1–0	(India) East Bengal	Hong Kong Stadium, Hong Kong
20:00 UTC+08:00	Kežman 69'	Report		Attendance: 7,366; Referee: Sgt. Win Cho (Myanmar)

26 April 2011 Group Stage	East Bengal (India)	3–3	(Hong Kong) South China	Barabati Stadium, Cuttack (Note: Kingfisher East Bengal v South China moved to Barabati Stadium at Cuttack due to the state assembly elections which would mean lack of security personnel for the match in Kolkata.)
15:00 UTC+05:30	Ozbey 20', 90+4' (pen.); Sahni 69'	Report	Kwok Kin Pong 58'; Cheng Lai Hin 87'; Li Haiqiang 90+3'	Attendance: 3,000; Referee: Kadhum Auda (Iraq)

3 May 2011 Group Stage	Chonburi (Thailand)	4–0	(India) East Bengal	IPE Chonburi Stadium, Chonburi
19:00 UTC+07:00	Ney Fabiano 45+1'; Therdsak 49'; Pipob 51', 69'	Report		Attendance: 6,897; Referee: Fan Qi (China P.R.)

10 May 2011 Group Stage	East Bengal (India)	1–1	(Indonesia) Persipura Jayapura	Salt Lake Stadium, Kolkata
17:00 UTC+05:30	Sahni 46'	Report	Bonai 3'	Attendance: 400; Referee: Ali Shaban (Kuwait)

== Statistics ==
=== Appearances ===
Players with no appearances are not included in the list.

Appearances for East Bengal in 2010–11 season
No.	Pos.	Nat.	Name	CFL		I League		Fed Cup		Durand Cup		Jubilee Cup		Super Cup		IFA Shield		AFC Cup		Total	
No.	Pos.	Nat.	Name	Apps	Starts	Apps	Starts	Apps	Starts	Apps	Starts	Apps	Starts	Apps	Starts	Apps	Starts	Apps	Starts	Apps	Starts
Goalkeepers
24	GK	(India)	Sandip Nandy	4	4	23	23	5	5	3	3			0	0	1	0	5	5	41	40
31	GK	(India)	Jayanta Paul	10	9	3	3	0	0	0	0	1	0	1	1			1	1	16	14
22	GK	(India)	Nassim Akhtar									2	2			1	1			3	3
1	GK	(India)	Abhra Mondal	3	3											3	2	0	0	6	5
Defenders
8	DF	(India)	Naoba Singh	10	10	22	21	5	5	3	3					1	0	4	4	45	43
29	DF	(India)	Soumik Dey	9	9	21	21	5	5	3	3							4	4	42	42
4	DF	(Nigeria)	Uga Okpara	10	10	20	20	5	5	3	3							4	4	42	42
16	DF	(India)	Gurwinder Singh	8	8	20	19	0	0	0	0	2	2	1	1	2	1	4	4	37	35
2	DF	(India)	Ravinder Singh	8	6	17	7	2	0	1	1	2	2	1	1	3	2	5	2	39	21
19	DF	(India)	Syed Rahim Nabi			10	8											4	3	14	11
3	DF	(India)	Nirmal Chhetri	8	8	10	7	5	5	3	3					1	1	1	1	28	25
5	DF	(India)	Sunil Thakur	7	5	7	5					2	2	1	1	2	2	2	2	21	17
26	DF	(India)	Mehrajuddin Wadoo			4	3									3	3	2	2	9	8
33	DF	(India)	Saikat Saha Roy	6	6	3	1					2	2	1	1	3	3	2	2	17	15
30	DF	(India)	Rajib Ghosh	2	2											3	2	0	0	5	4
Midfielders
14	MF	(India)	Mehtab Hossain	14	12	23	23	5	5	2	2			1	1	1	1	5	5	51	49
18	MF	(Nigeria)	Penn Orji	13	11	23	23	5	5	2	2			1	1			5	5	49	47
15	MF	(India)	Sanju Pradhan	14	7	19	17	3	0	3	2	2	2	1	1	3	2	6	2	51	33
17	MF	(India)	Sushant Matthews	5	4	17	15	3	0	2	1	2	2	1	1	2	2	4	3	36	28
7	MF	(India)	Harmanjot Khabra	11	9	10	8	5	5	3	3							1	1	30	26
12	MF	(India)	Reisengmei Vashum	9	8	7	6	5	5	1	1					3	2	3	3	28	25
27	MF	(India)	Beikhokhei	6	5	3	1													9	6
9	MF	(India)	Alvito D'Cunha	4	2	2	0					2	2	1	0					9	4
	MF	(India)	Aseem Kutty	1	1							2	1							3	2
	MF	(India)	Lalchuanwama	1	1							1	0							2	1
42	MF	(India)	Biswajit Natta	1	1							2	0							3	1
	MF	(India)	Sukamal Santra	1	0															1	0
	MF	(India)	Surojit Roy	1	0															1	0
Forwards
20	FW	(Australia)	Tolgay Ozbey	10	7	23	22	5	5	2	2			1	0	1	1	5	5	47	42
23	FW	(India)	Robin Singh	13	10	16	13	5	5	3	3	2	2	1	1	2	2	5	4	47	40
6	FW	(India)	Baljit Singh Saini			14	11									3	3	6	0	23	14
11	FW	(India)	Sushil Kumar			6	3									2	2	3	2	11	7
35	FW	(India)	Budhiram Tudu	12	8	5	0	3	0	2	1	2	2	1	1					25	12
10	FW	(Nigeria)	Ekene Ikenwa	11	8			3	0	3	0									17	8
10	FW	(Brazil)	Leko			5	3									1	1	3	2	9	6
40	FW	(India)	Biswarup Deb			4	3											0	0	4	3
25	FW	(India)	Bikash Narzinary	3	2							2	1							5	3

=== Goal scorers ===
Goals for East Bengal in 2010–11 season
Rank	No.	Pos.	Nat.	Name	CFL	I League	Fed Cup	Durand Cup	Jubilee Cup	Super Cup	IFA Shield	AFC Cup	Total
1	20	FW	(Australia)	Tolgay Ozbey	8	17	4	3		0	0	5	37
2	18	MF	(Nigeria)	Penn Orji	9	3	2	1		1		0	16
3	23	FW	(India)	Robin Singh	6	6	1	0	2	0	0	0	15
4	6	FW	(India)	Baljit Singh Saini		6				0	2	3	11
5	10	FW	(Nigeria)	Ekene Ikenwa	8		0	1					9
6	12	MF	(India)	Reisengmei Vashum	1	1	1	0		0	1	0	4
6	15	MF	(India)	Sanju Pradhan	0	2	0	1	1	0	0	0	4
6	35	FW	(India)	Budhiram Tudu	4				0	0			4
9	2	DF	(India)	Ravinder Singh	0	0	0	0	0	0	2	1	3
9	4	DF	(Nigeria)	Uga Okpara	0	3	0	0		0	0	0	3
9	14	MF	(India)	Mehtab Hossain	2	1	0	0		0	0	0	3
9	25	FW	(India)	Bikash Narzinary	3				0				3
13	7	MF	(India)	Harmanjot Khabra	2	0	0	0		0	0	0	2
13	9	MF	(India)	Alvito D'Cunha	1	0			1	0	0	0	2
13	17	MF	(India)	Sushant Matthews	1	1	0	0	0	0	0	0	2
13	29	DF	(India)	Soumik Dey	1	1	0	0		0	0	0	2
17	3	DF	(India)	Nirmal Chhetri	1	0	0	0		0	0	0	1
17	11	FW	(India)	Sushil Kumar		1					0	0	1
17	19	DF	(India)	Syed Rahim Nabi		1						0	1
17	30	DF	(India)	Rajib Ghosh	1				0		0		1
17	33	DF	(India)	Saikat Saha Roy	1	0		0	0	0	0	0	1
17	40	FW	(India)	Biswarup Deb		1						0	1
Own Goals					0	0	0	0	0	0	0	0	0
Total					49	44	8	6	4	1	5	9	126
