= 2013–14 East Bengal FC season =

Indian football club season

East Bengal
2013-14 season
- President: Dr Pranab Dasgupta
- Head-Coach: Marcos Falopa (until 14 November 2013); Armando Colaco (from 14 November 2013)
- Ground: Salt Lake Stadium; Kalyani Stadium; East Bengal Ground
- I-League: Runner-up
- Calcutta Football League: Champions
- Federation Cup: Group Stage
- AFC Cup: Semi-finals
- IFA Shield: Fourth
- Top goalscorer: League: Chidi Edeh (9); All: Chidi Edeh (20)
Home colours	Away colours

The 2013–14 season was East Bengal's 94th season since its formation in 1920.

== Key events ==
- 12 June 2013: Brazilian Marcos Falopa succeeds Trevor Morgan as the head coach.
- 6 July 2013: The club signed James Moga from Pune FC who became their second foreigner.
- 15 July 2013: The club revealed Ryuji Sueoka as their fourth foreigner.
- 17 September 2013: They continue their winning streak in the AFC Cup by beating Semen Padang. AIFF General Secretary Kushal Das congratulated the club on the behalf of entire AIFF.
- 24 September 2013: East Bengal drew with Semen and secured the semi-final stages, becoming the second Indian club to do so. They will meet Al-Kuwait.
- 14 November 2013: East Bengal appoint Armando Colaco as their new head coach.

== Transfers ==
In: Note: Flags indicate national team as defined under FIFA eligibility rules; some limited exceptions apply. Players may hold more than one non-FIFA nationality.

No.	Pos.	Nation	Player
—	FW	JPN	Ryuji Sueoka (from Dempo)
—	GK	IND	Abhra Mondal (from Pune)
—	FW	SSD	James Moga (Free Agent)
—	FW	IND	Joaquim Abranches (Free Agent)

Out: Note: Flags indicate national team as defined under FIFA eligibility rules; some limited exceptions apply. Players may hold more than one non-FIFA nationality.

No.	Pos.	Nation	Player
—	FW	IND	Robin Singh (Released)
—	MF	NGR	Penn Orji (to Mohammedan)
—	FW	AUS	Andrew Barisic (Released)
—	MF	IND	Khanthang Paite (Released)

== First-team squad ==
As of 2 September 2013

Note: Flags indicate national team as defined under FIFA eligibility rules; some limited exceptions apply. Players may hold more than one non-FIFA nationality.

No.	Pos.	Nation	Player
1	GK	IND	Abhijit Mondal
2	DF	IND	Raju Gaikwad
3	DF	IND	Arnab Mondal
4	DF	NGR	Uga Okpara (vice-captain)
5	DF	IND	Abhishek Das
6	FW	IND	Baljit Sahni
7	MF	IND	Harmanjot Khabra
8	DF	IND	Naoba Singh (3rd captain)
9	MF	IND	Alvito D'Cunha
10	FW	NGR	Chidi Edeh
11	MF	JPN	Ryuji Sueoka
12	MF	IND	Reisangmei Vashum
14	MF	IND	Mehtab Hossain (captain)
15	FW	SSD	James Moga
16	DF	IND	Gurwinder Singh

No.	Pos.	Nation	Player
17	FW	IND	Joaquim Abranches
19	DF	IND	Robert Lalthalma
20	MF	IND	Lalrindika Ralte
21	FW	IND	Seminlen Doungel
23	DF	IND	Safar Sardar
24	FW	IND	Cavin Lobo
26	GK	IND	Abhra Mondal
27	GK	IND	Jayanta Pal
28	MF	IND	Shylo Tulunga
29	DF	IND	Saumik Dey
30	GK	IND	Gurpreet Singh Sandhu
33	MF	IND	Dipankar Roy
34	MF	IND	Subodh Kumar
35	FW	IND	Nilendra Dewan

== Competitions ==
=== Overall ===
Competition	First match	Last match	Final position
Calcutta Football League	12 September 2013	11 January 2014	Champions
I-League	9 October 2013	28 April 2014	Runners-up
Federation Cup	15 January 2014	21 January 2014	Group Stage
IFA Shield	29 January 2014	13 February 2014	Fourth
AFC Cup (Note: The continuation of the 2013 AFC Cup from the Quarter-final stage happened in the 2013-14 season.)	17 September 2013	22 October 2013	Semi-finals

=== Overview ===
Competition	Record							
Competition	Pld	W	D	L	GF	GA	GD	Win %
Calcutta Football League	11	9	1	1	28	5	+23	81.82
I-League	24	12	7	5	39	23	+16	50.00
Federation Cup	3	1	1	1	4	3	+1	33.33
IFA Shield	5	2	2	1	6	5	+1	40.00
AFC Cup	4	1	1	2	4	8	−4	25.00
Total	47	25	12	10	81	44	+37	53.19

Last updated: 31 May 2014
Source: Competitions

=== Calcutta Football League ===
==== Table ====
2013–14 Calcutta Premier Division

==== Fixtures & results ====
Win Draw Loss

12 September 2013 1	East Bengal	4–0	Police A.C.	Kolkata
16:00 IST	Chidi Edeh 10'; Joaquim Abranches 27', 49'; Lalrindika Ralte 33'	report		Stadium: Salt Lake Stadium; Referee: Prabeer Dhar

13 November 2013 2	East Bengal	2–1	Peerless	Kolkata
14:00 IST	Harmanjot Khabra 35'; James Moga 47'	report	Christopher Chizoba 63'	Stadium: East Bengal Ground; Referee: Ajit Dutta

16 November 2013 3	East Bengal	2–1	Aryan	Kolkata
17:00 IST	Cavin Lobo 25'; Chidi Edeh 41'	report	Stanley 78' (pen.)	Stadium: Salt Lake Stadium; Referee: Pranjal Banerjee

19 November 2013 4	East Bengal	4–1	George Telegraph	Kolkata
17:00 IST	Cavin Lobo 22'; Chidi Edeh 42', 62', 72'	report	Bibekananda 90+2'	Stadium: Salt Lake Stadium; Referee: Bapi Dey

19 December 2013 5	East Bengal	5–0	Bhawanipore	Kolkata
14:00 IST	James Moga 25', 44', 47'; Reisangmei Vashum 45+1'; Ryuji Sueoka 75'	report		Stadium: East Bengal Ground; Referee: Ranjit Bakshi

29 December 2013 6	East Bengal	3–0	Army XI	Kolkata
17:00 IST	Ryuji Sueoka 31'; Seiminlen Doungel 37'; Reisangmei Vashum 81'	report		Stadium: Salt Lake Stadium; Referee: Subrata Burman

31 December 2013 7	East Bengal	4–1	Railway FC	Kolkata
14:00 IST	Lalrindika Ralte 27' (pen.); Harmanjot Khabra 45+1'; Seiminlen Doungel 62', 65'	report	Raju Gaikwad 85' (o.g.)	Stadium: East Bengal Ground; Referee: Kanika Burman

2 January 2014 8	East Bengal	0–0	Mohammedan Sporting	Kolkata
16:30 IST		report		Stadium: Salt Lake Stadium; Referee: Prabir Dhar

5 January 2014 9	East Bengal	2–0	United	Kolkata
16:30 IST	James Moga 12'; Chidi Edeh 81'; Harmanjot Khabra (yellow card) 42' (yellow-red card) 90+2'	report		Stadium: Salt Lake Stadium; Referee: Biplab Poddar

8 January 2014 10	East Bengal	2–0	Kalighat MS	Kolkata
14:00 IST	James Moga 23'; Chidi Edeh 76'	report		Stadium: East Bengal Ground; Referee: Ujjal Haldar

11 January 2014 11	East Bengal	0–1	Mohun Bagan	Kolkata
16:30 IST		report	Katsumi Yusa 83'	Stadium: Salt Lake Stadium; Referee: Pranjal Banerjee

=== I-League ===
==== Table ====
Pos	Team	Pld	W	D	L	GF	GA	GD	Pts	Qualification or relegation
1	Bengaluru (C)	24	14	5	5	42	28	+14	47	Qualification for 2015 AFC Champions League qualifying play-off
2	East Bengal	24	12	7	5	39	23	+16	43	Qualification for 2015 AFC Cup group stage
3	Salgaocar	24	11	6	7	36	25	+11	39	
4	Dempo	24	9	8	7	31	25	+6	35	
5	Sporting Goa	24	9	7	8	34	34	0	34	

Source: IndiaFooty.com
Rules for classification: 1) points; 2) head-to-head points; 3) goal difference; 4) number of goals scored; 5) taking lots
(C) Champions

==== Fixtures & results ====
Win Draw Loss

9 October 2013 1	Shillong Lajong	0–4	East Bengal	Shillong
15:30 IST		Report	James 20' 63'; Chidi 45'; Subodh (yellow card) 50'; Cavin 55'	Stadium: Jawaharlal Nehru Stadium; Referee: Raktim Shah

17 October 2013 2	East Bengal	1–3	Dempo	Kalyani
14:30 IST	Uga (yellow card) 10' (yellow-red card) 75'; Baljit 85'	Report	Clifford 3'; Beto 54' (pen.), 77'	Stadium: Kalyani Stadium; Referee: Pratap Singh

26 October 2013 3	East Bengal	2–0	Bengaluru FC	Kolkata
14:30 IST	Mehtab (yellow card) 21'; Robin 49' (o.g.); Robert (yellow card) 82'; James 90+4' (yellow card) 90+4'	Report	John (yellow card) 22'; Johnny (yellow card) 82'; Siam (yellow card) 90+1'	Stadium: Salt Lake Stadium; Referee: Rahul Dsa

1 November 2013 4	East Bengal	2–3	Salgaocar	Kolkata
14:30 IST	Moga 64'; Gurwinder (yellow card) 66'; Len 77'	Report	Karma 8'; Francis 10'; Clifton 60'	Stadium: Salt Lake Stadium; Referee: Umesh Bora

5 November 2013 5	Sporting Clube de Goa	1–1	East Bengal	Mapusa
15:45 IST	Dawson 41' (pen.); Ravi (yellow card) 45'	Report	Harmanjot (yellow card) 43'; Dika (yellow card) 45+1'; Arnab (yellow card) 59'; Cavin (yellow card) 61'; Mehtab (yellow card) 70' (goal) 90+4'	Stadium: Duler Stadium; Referee: Ratheesh Kumar

24 November 2013 6	Mohun Bagan	0–1	East Bengal	Kolkata
17:00 IST		Report	Ryuji (yellow card) 44'; Dika 73' (yellow card) 74'	Stadium: Salt Lake Stadium; Referee: Pratap Singh

28 November 2013 7	East Bengal	1–1	United SC	Kolkata
17:30 IST	Chidi (yellow card) 27' (goal) 32'	Report	Anupam (yellow card) 6'; Dhanachandra 59'; Hasan (yellow card) 83'	Stadium: Salt Lake Stadium; Referee: Khamba Singh

2 December 2013 8	Mumbai FC	3–2	East Bengal	Mumbai
18:00 IST	Yakubu 2'; Ahmad 37' (yellow card) 67' (yellow-red card) 80'; Pradeep 65'	Report	Cavin (yellow card) 1' (goal) 32'; Ryuji 87'	Stadium: Cooperage Ground; Referee: CR Srikrishna

7 December 2013 9	Rangdajied United	1–2	East Bengal	Shillong
17:00 IST	Lamine (yellow card) 15'; Kim 45+1'; Yohei (yellow card) 90+1'	Report	Gurwinder 41'; Harmanjot (yellow card) 76'; Shylo 84'; Saumik (yellow card) 90+3'	Stadium: Jawaharlal Nehru Stadium; Referee: Umesh Bora

11 December 2013 10	Salgaocar	0–0	East Bengal	Mapusa
15:30 IST		Report		Stadium: Duler Stadium; Referee: Vishnu Chauhan

15 December 2013 11	Bengaluru FC	0–2	East Bengal	Bangaluru
15:00 IST	Darren (yellow card) 76'	Report	James 17'; Raju (yellow card) 42'; Cavin (yellow card) 59'; Chidi 81'	Stadium: Bangalore Football Stadium; Referee: Anthony Simoees

18 February 2014 12	East Bengal	0–0	Churchill Brothers	Kolkata
15:00 IST		Report		Stadium: Salt Lake Stadium; Referee: Pratap Singh

23 February 2014 13	Dempo	1–0	East Bengal	Vasco da Gama
15:00 IST	Ozbey 70'	Report		Stadium: Tilak Maidan Stadium; Referee: Vishnu Chauhan

1 March 2014 14	East Bengal	1–1	Mohun Bagan	Kolkata
17:00 IST	James 39'	Report	Sabeeth 67'	Stadium: Salt Lake Stadium; Referee: Santosh Kumar

11 March 2014 15	East Bengal	2–1	Mohammedan Sporting	Kolkata
17:00 IST	James 18'; Chidi 84'	Report	Hasegawa 34'	Stadium: Salt Lake Stadium; Referee: C.R. Srikrishna

14 March 2014 16	East Bengal	0–0	Shillong Lajong	Kolkata
17:00 IST		Report		Stadium: Salt Lake Stadium; Referee: Rahul Dsa

23 March 2014 17	East Bengal	3–1	Rangdajied United	Kolkata
15:00 IST	Chidi 16' (pen.); Vashum 45+1'; Lenn 55'	Report	Ranti Martins 30'	Stadium: Salt Lake Stadium; Referee: Armughan Rowan

26 March 2014 18	East Bengal	2–2	Mumbai	Kolkata
15:00 IST	Ryuji 66', 68'	Report	Yakubu 61'; Mehta 87'	Stadium: Salt Lake Stadium; Referee: Anthony Simoees

30 March 2014 19	East Bengal	2–1	Sporting Club de Goa	Kolkata
17:00 IST	Sahni 45+2'; Dika 65'	Report	D'Mello 90'	Stadium: Salt Lake Stadium; Referee: Umesh Bora

5 April 2014 20	Mohammedan Sporting	1–3	East Bengal	Kolkata
17:00 IST	Joshimar 41'	Report	Ryuji 11'; Abranches 40'; Chidi 62'	Stadium: Salt Lake Stadium; Referee: Pratap Singh

12 April 2014 21	East Bengal	3–1	Pune	Kolkata
17:00 IST	Chidi 18'; Dika 43', 70'	Report	Pavlović 58'	Stadium: Salt Lake Stadium; Referee: Khamba Singh

16 April 2014 22	Churchill Brothers	1–0	East Bengal	Margao
17:00 IST	Raju 23'	Report		Stadium: Fatorda Stadium; Referee: C.R. Srikrishna

19 April 2014 23	Pune	1–2	East Bengal	Pune
19:00 IST	D'Souza 39'	Report	Chidi 72'; Lenn 75'	Stadium: Balewadi Stadium; Referee: Armughan Rowan

28 April 2014 24	United	0–3	East Bengal	Kolkata
17:30 IST		Report	Das 64'; Chidi 84'; Lenn 90'	Stadium: Salt Lake Stadium; Referee: Umesh Bora

=== Federation Cup ===
Group B

Team	Pld	W	D	L	GF	GA	GD	Pts
Sporting Goa	3	2	0	1	7	6	+1	6
East Bengal	3	1	1	1	4	3	+1	4
Bengaluru FC	3	1	1	1	6	6	0	4
Rangdajied United	3	0	2	1	2	4	−2	2

==== Fixtures & results ====
Win Draw Loss

15 January 2014 Group Stage	East Bengal	1–1	Rangdajied United	Manjeri
	Moga 56'	Report	Seng-Yong 20'	Stadium: MDS Complex

18 January 2014 Group Stage	Sporting Goa	2–1	East Bengal	Manjeri
	Fernandes 18'; D'Mello 85'	Report	Sueoka 58'	Stadium: MDS Complex

21 January 2014 Group Stage	East Bengal	2–0	Bengaluru FC	Manjeri
	Edeh 62', 75'	Report		Stadium: MDS Complex

=== IFA Shield ===
Group A

Team	Pld	W	D	L	GF	GA	GD	Pts
(India) East Bengal	3	2	1	0	5	1	+4	7
(India) United	3	2	0	1	4	4	0	6
(South Korea) Sun Moon University	3	0	2	1	2	3	−1	2
(Singapore) Geylang International	3	0	1	2	1	4	−3	1

Source: RSSSF

==== Fixtures & results ====
Win Draw Loss

29 January 2014 Group stage	East Bengal	1–1	Busan Kyotong	Kolkata
15:15 UTC+5:30	James Moga 78'	Report	Gim Dae Han 6'	Stadium: Barasat Stadium

1 February 2014 Group stage	East Bengal	2–0	Geylang International	Kolkata
15:15 UTC+5:30	Seminlen Doungel 72'; Chidi Edeh 90'	Report		Stadium: Salt Lake Stadium

4 February 2014 Group stage	East Bengal	2–0	United SC	Kolkata
15:15 UTC+5:30	Lalrindika Ralte 49'; James Moga 69'	Report	Ranti Martins (red card) 47'	Stadium: Salt Lake Stadium

11 February 2014 Semi-final	East Bengal	0–3	Sheikh Jamal Dhanmondi	Kolkata
15:15 UTC+5:30		Report	Emeka Darlington 22'; Sony Norde 37'; Wedson Anselme 66'	Stadium: Salt Lake Stadium

13 February 2014 Third-Place Play-off	East Bengal	1–1 (a.e.t.) (4-5 p)	United	Kolkata
15:15 UTC+5:30	Chidi Edeh 22' (pen.)	Report	Baldeep Singh 73'	Stadium: Salt Lake Stadium
	Penalties
	Edeh (penalty missed); Lobo (penalty scored); Tluanga (penalty scored); Kumar (penalty scored); N. Singh (penalty scored); Khabra (penalty missed)		(penalty scored) Martins; (penalty missed) Razaq; (penalty scored) D. Singh; (penalty scored) Biswas; (penalty scored) Sarkar; (penalty scored) Chakraborty

=== AFC Cup ===
==== Knock-out Stage ====
Round of 16
(Kuwait) Al-Qadsia	4
(Oman) Fanja	0
(Iraq) Erbil	3
(Syria) Al-Shorta (a.e.t.)	4
(Malaysia) Kelantan	0
(Hong Kong) Kitchee	2
(Jordan) Al-Faisaly	3
(Bahrain) Al-Riffa	1
(Maldives) New Radiant (a.e.t.)	2
(Malaysia) Selangor	0
Al-Kuwait (p)	1 (4)
(Iraq) Dohuk	1 (1)
(India) East Bengal	5
(Myanmar) Yangon United	1
(Indonesia) Semen Padang	2
(Vietnam) SHB Đà Nẵng	1

Quarter-finals
(Kuwait) Al-Qadsia (a)	0	2	2
(Syria) Al-Shorta	0	2	2
(Hong Kong) Kitchee	1	1	2
(Jordan) Al-Faisaly	2	2	4
(Maldives) New Radiant	2	0	2
Al-Kuwait	7	5	12
(India) East Bengal	1	1	2
(Indonesia) Semen Padang	0	1	1

Semi-finals
(Kuwait) Al-Qadsia	2	1	3
(Jordan) Al-Faisaly	1	0	1
Al-Kuwait	4	3	7
(India) East Bengal	2	0	2

Final
(Kuwait) Al-Qadsia	0
Al-Kuwait	2

==== Fixtures & results ====
Win Draw Loss

17 September 2013 QF 1st leg	East Bengal	1–0	Semen Padang	Kolkata
16:30 IST	Sueoka 71'	report		Stadium: Salt Lake Stadium; Attendance: 30,000; Referee: Iida Jumpe (Japan)

24 September 2013 QF 2nd leg	Semen Padang	1–1	East Bengal	Padang
1:30 IST	Junior 23'	report	James Moga 78'	Stadium: Haji Agus Salim Stadium; Attendance: 11,350; Referee: Mohammed A Alawaji (Saudi Arabia)

1 October 2013 SF 1st leg	Al-Kuwait	4–2	East Bengal	Kuwait City
19:30 UTC+3	Jemâa 17', 33'; Ali 32'; Hammami 48'	Report	Okpara 65'; Ralte 87'	Stadium: Al Kuwait Sports Club Stadium; Attendance: 1,000; Referee: Tan Hai (China PR)

22 October 2013 SF 2nd leg	East Bengal	0–3	Al-Kuwait	Kolkata
16:00 UTC+5:30		Report	Rogerinho 43'; Khamis 44'; Das 87' (o.g.)	Stadium: Salt Lake Stadium; Attendance: 50,000; Referee: Strebre Delovski (Australia)

== Statistics ==
=== Appearances ===
Players with no appearances are not included in the list.

Appearances for East Bengal in 2013–14 season
No.	Pos.	Nat.	Name	CFL		I League		Fed Cup		IFA Shield		AFC Cup		Total	
No.	Pos.	Nat.	Name	Apps	Starts	Apps	Starts	Apps	Starts	Apps	Starts	Apps	Starts	Apps	Starts
Goalkeepers
1	GK	(India)	Abhijit Mondal	2	2	12	12	0	0	0	0	1	1	15	15
30	GK	(India)	Gurpreet Singh Sandhu	9	9	8	8	3	3	3	3	3	3	26	26
26	GK	(India)	Abhra Mondal	2	0	4	4	0	0	2	2	0	0	8	6
Defenders
3	DF	(India)	Arnab Mondal	5	5	20	18	2	2	3	3	4	4	34	32
2	DF	(India)	Raju Gaikwad	4	4	17	14	3	3	5	5	0	0	29	26
8	DF	(India)	Naoba Singh	9	9	15	11	1	1	1	1	3	3	29	25
19	DF	(India)	Robert Lalthlamuana	6	6	14	14	1	1	4	4	3	2	28	27
16	DF	(India)	Gurwinder Singh	8	8	13	8	0	0	1	1	1	0	23	17
5	DF	(India)	Abhishek Das	1	1	10	9			5	4	1	1	17	15
29	DF	(India)	Soumik Dey	8	7	10	10	2	2	2	2	4	4	26	25
4	DF	(Nigeria)	Uga Okpara	2	2	9	9	3	3			4	4	18	18
23	DF	(India)	Safar Sardar			1	0							1	0
Midfielders
24	MF	(India)	Cavin Lobo	10	9	23	20	2	2	3	1	3	2	41	34
20	MF	(India)	Lalrindika Ralte	6	6	22	20	3	3	4	3	4	3	39	35
7	MF	(India)	Harmanjot Khabra	9	9	21	19	2	2	2	0	1	1	35	31
11	MF	(Japan)	Ryuji Sueoka	10	9	18	17	3	3	4	4	2	1	37	34
28	MF	(India)	Shylo Malsawmtluanga	9	3	17	12	1	1	4	4	1	0	32	20
17	MF	(India)	Joaquim Abranches	4	4	15	9	1	1	2	2	4	3	26	19
14	MF	(India)	Mehtab Hossain	1	1	8	8			2	1	4	4	15	14
18	MF	(India)	Subodh Kumar	6	5	7	4	0	0	5	4			18	13
12	MF	(India)	Reisangmei Vashum	6	6	3	3			0	0	1	1	10	10
9	MF	(India)	Alvito D'Cunha	4	1	0	0			3	1	1	0	8	2
33	MF	(India)	Dipankar Roy	2	0									2	0
Forwards
10	FW	(Nigeria)	Chidi Edeh	8	4	22	22	3	3	5	5	4	4	42	38
21	FW	(India)	Semilen Doungel	8	2	17	2	0	0	4	1			29	5
15	FW	(South Sudan)	James Moga	9	7	14	11	3	3	4	4	4	3	34	28
6	FW	(India)	Baljit Singh Sahni	5	2	9	0					3	0	17	2

=== Goal scorers ===
Goals for East Bengal in 2013–14 season
Rank	No.	Pos.	Nat.	Name	CFL	I League	Fed Cup	IFA Shield	AFC Cup	Total
1	10	FW	(Nigeria)	Chidi Edeh	7	9	2	2	0	20
2	15	FW	(South Sudan)	James Moga	6	7	1	2	1	17
3	11	MF	(Japan)	Ryuji Sueoka	2	4	1	0	1	8
3	20	MF	(India)	Lalrindika Ralte	2	4	0	1	1	8
3	21	FW	(India)	Semilen Doungel	3	4	0	1		8
6	24	MF	(India)	Cavin Lobo	2	2	0	0	0	4
7	12	MF	(India)	Reisangmei Vashum	2	1		0	0	3
7	17	MF	(India)	Joaquim Abranches	2	1	0	0	0	3
9	6	FW	(India)	Baljit Singh Sahni	0	2	0	0	0	2
9	7	MF	(India)	Harmanjot Khabra	2	0	0	0	0	2
11	4	DF	(Nigeria)	Uga Okpara	0	0	0		1	1
11	5	DF	(India)	Abhishek Das	0	1		0	0	1
11	16	DF	(India)	Gurwinder Singh	0	1	0		0	1
11	28	MF	(India)	Shylo Malsawmtluanga	0	1	0	0	0	1
Own goals					0	2	0	0	0	2
Total					28	39	4	6	4	81
