= Mehtab Hossain =

Indian footballer

Mahtab Hossain
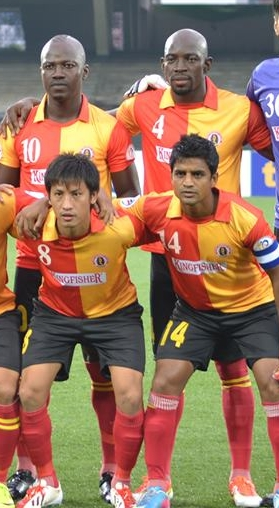
- Mahtab (bottom right) in 2013 with East Bengal

Personal information
- Full name: Mahtab Hossain
- Date of birth: 5 September 1985 (age 41)
- Place of birth: Baruipur, West Bengal, India
- Height: 1.70 m (5 ft 7 in)
- Position: Defensive midfielder

Team information
- Current team: Sundarban Bengal Auto (head coach)

Youth career
- Food Corporation of India

Senior career*
Years	Team	Apps	(Gls)
2001–2003	Tollygunge Agragami	17	(1)
2003–2006	Mohun Bagan	39	(3)
2006–2007	ONGC		
2007–2017	East Bengal	244	(10)
2014–2016	→ Kerala Blasters (loan)	38	(0)
2017–2018	Jamshedpur	12	(0)
2018–2019	Mohun Bagan	11	(0)
2021	Madan Maharaj	5	(0)

International career
2005–2015	India	33	(2)

Managerial career
- 2019–2020: Southern Samity
- 2025–: Sundarban Bengal Auto
- * Club domestic league appearances and goals

Mehtab Hossain (born 5 September 1985) is an Indian football manager and former footballer who serves as the head coach of the Bengal Super League club Sundarban Bengal Auto. He played as a defensive midfielder.

During his career, Hossain has played for both of the Kolkata football giants, Mohun Bagan and East Bengal. He played with East Bengal for ten seasons, winning the Federation Cup three times. He also managed to gain 31 caps for the India national football team between 2005 and 2014, scoring twice for the country. On 2019, Mehtab started his coaching career as manager at Southern Samity in 2019–20 Calcutta Premier Division. He joined Bharatiya Janata Party on 21 July 2020 by taking party flag from BJP president of West Bengal Dilip Ghosh, but within 24 hours he changed his decision and resigned.

== Career ==
Mehtab is a product of IFA's Baby League, which was the brain child of Legendary Football Secretary Shri Prodyut Dutta, which promoted football amongst the children and youth of Bengal.

It was reported in June 2012, that he was on trial with Falkirk, Airdrie, and Exeter City FC on recommendation of his former teammate Alan Gow.

He scored his first goal in the 2012–13 I-League in their penultimate match in the 6–0 win against United Sikkim F.C. on 8 May at Kolkata. Then he scored in the 5–1 win in Round of 16 match in 2013 AFC Cup match against Yangon United F.C. on 15 May at Kolkata.

On 2015, Mehtab retired from international duty after being omitted from the 26-man squad for World Cup Qualifiers.

Mehtab had more than 400 appearances in his career at six Indian clubs.

=== East Bengal ===
Hossain joined East Bengal in 2007. He had 255 appearances for the club over a span of ten years.

=== Kerala Blasters ===
On 2014, he was picked by Kerala Blasters FC of Indian Super League on a three years contract.

=== Jamshedpur ===
On 23 July 2017, Hossain was selected in the third round of the 2017–18 ISL Players Draft by Jamshedpur for the 2017–18 Indian Super League. He made his debut for the club during the first ever match on 18 November 2017 against NorthEast United. He started the match and played 69 minutes as Jamshedpur drew 0–0.

=== Mohun Bagan ===
After ending the season with Jamshedpur, Hossain reportedly decided not to renew his contract with the club since he wanted to return to Kolkata and be near his family. Despite stating previously that he would like to return to East Bengal, it was reported that he was in talks with Mohun Bagan. Then, on 22 May 2018, it was officially announced that Hossain had signed with Mohun Bagan, after last playing for them 12 years prior.

In 2021, he came out of retirement to play for Madan Maharaj FC in the I-League Qualifiers where he is also the mentor.

== Honours ==
India

- SAFF Championship: 2005; runner-up: 2013
- Nehru Cup: 2012

East Bengal

- Federation Cup: 2007, 2009–10, 2010, 2012
- Super Cup: 2011
- IFA Shield: 2012
- Calcutta Football League: 2010, 2011, 2012–13, 2013–14, 2014, 2015, 2016

Mohun Bagan

- Calcutta Football League: 2018

== Career statistics ==
=== Club ===
As of 27 January 2019

Club	Season	League			Federation Cup		CFL Premier A		Domestic Cups		Others		AFC		Total	
Club	Season	Division	Apps	Goals	Apps	Goals	Apps	Goals	Apps	Goals	Apps	Goals	Apps	Goals	Apps	Goals
Tollygunge Agragami	2001–02	NFL	17	1	—	—	—	—	—	—	—	—	—	—	17	1
Tollygunge Agragami	2002–03	NFL	0	0	—	—	—	—	—	—	—	—	—	—	0	0
Tollygunge Agragami	Tollygunge Agragami Total		17	1	—	—	—	—	—	—	—	—	—	—	17	1
Mohun Bagan	2003–04	NFL	0	0	—	—	—	—	—	—	—	—	—	—	0	0
Mohun Bagan	2004–05	NFL	20	0	—	—	—	—	—	—	—	—	—	—	20	0
Mohun Bagan	2005–06	NFL	19	3	—	—	—	—	—	—	—	—	—	—	19	3
Mohun Bagan	Mohun Bagan Total		39	3	—	—	—	—	—	—	—	—	—	—	39	3
ONGC	2006–07	I-League 2nd Division	0	0	—	—	—	—	—	—	—	—	—	—	0	0
ONGC	ONGC Total		0	0	—	—	—	—	—	—	—	—	—	—	0	0
East Bengal	2007–08	I-League	17	1	0	0	7	1	2	0	1 (Note: Appearances in Super Cup.)	0	6	0	33	2
East Bengal	2008–09	I-League	17	0	4	0	9	1	—	—	—	—	—	—	30	1
East Bengal	2009–10	I-League	25	2	4	1	9	0	3 (Note: 2 Appearances in IFA Shield and 1 Appearances in Durand Cup.)	0	1 (Note: Appearances in E. K. Nayanar Cup.)	0	5	1	47	4
East Bengal	2010–11	I-League	23	1	5	0	14	2	3 (Note: 2 Appearances in Durand Cup and 1 Appearances in IFA Shield.)	0	1	0	5	0	51	3
East Bengal	2011–12	I-League	16	0	4	0	6	0	1 (Note: Appearances in IFA Shield.)	0	—	—	4	0	31	0
East Bengal	2012–13	I-League	23	1	4	0	2	0	2	0	—	—	6	1	37	2
East Bengal	2013–14	I-League	8	0	—	—	1	0	2	0	—	—	4	0	15	0
East Bengal	2014–15	I-League	16	0	4	0	5	0	—	—	—	—	4	0	29	0
East Bengal	2015–16	I-League	14	0	2	0	8	1	—	—	—	—	—	—	24	1
East Bengal	2016–17	I-League	16	0	3	0	8	0	—	—	—	—	—	—	27	0
East Bengal	East Bengal Total		175	5	30	1	69	5	13	0	3	0	34	2	324	13
Kerala Blasters (loan)	2014	Indian Super League	9	0	—	—	—	—	—	—	—	—	—	—	9	0
Kerala Blasters (loan)	2015	Indian Super League	13	0	—	—	—	—	—	—	—	—	—	—	13	0
Kerala Blasters (loan)	2016	Indian Super League	16	0	—	—	—	—	—	—	—	—	—	—	16	0
Kerala Blasters (loan)	Kerala Blasters Total		38	0	—	—	—	—	—	—	—	—	—	—	38	0
Jamshedpur FC	2017–18	Indian Super League	12	0	1	0	—	—	—	—	—	—	—	—	13	0
Jamshedpur FC	Jamshedpur Total		12	0	1	0	—	—	—	—	—	—	—	—	13	0
Mohun Bagan	2018–19	I-League	9	0	0	0	2	0	—	—	—	—	—	—	11	0
Mohun Bagan	Mohun Bagan Total		9	0	0	0	2	0	—	—	—	—	—	—	11	0
Career Total			290	9	31	1	71	5	13	0	3	0	34	2	442	17

=== International stats ===
India national team
Year	Apps	Goals
2005	3	2
2006	3	0
2011	5	0
2012	6	0
2013	12	0
2014	2	0
Total	31	2

Sporting positions
Preceded by Manitombi Singh	Mohun Bagan captain 2006–2007	Succeeded by Jose Ramirez Barreto
Preceded by Sanju Pradhan	Kingfisher East Bengal captain 2013–2014	Succeeded by Harmanjot Khabra
