= Raju Gaikwad =

Indian footballer (born 1990)

Personal information
- Full name: Raju Eknath Gaikwad
- Date of birth: 25 September 1990 (age 36)
- Place of birth: Mumbai, Maharashtra, India
- Height: 1.80 m (5 ft 11 in)
- Positions: Centre-back; left back

Team information
- Current team: Diamond Harbour FC
- Number: 47

Youth career
- Tata Football Academy

Senior career*
Years	Team	Apps	(Gls)
2010–2011	Pailan Arrows	14	(0)
2011–2015	East Bengal	37	(0)
2014	→ Mumbai City (loan)	3	(0)
2015–2017	Mohun Bagan	14	(0)
2015–2016	→ Goa (loan)	23	(0)
2017–18	Mumbai City	15	(0)
2018-2019	Jamshedpur	5	(0)
2019–2020	Kerala Blasters	12	(0)
2021–2022	East Bengal	19	(0)
2022–2023	Churchill Brothers	12	(1)
2023	Delhi	2	(0)
2024-	Diamond Harbour FC	2	(0)

International career^{‡}
2011–2013	India U23	4	(0)
2011–	India	23	(0)
- * Club domestic league appearances and goals as of 19:49, 11 March 2023 (UTC) ‡ National team caps and goals as of 16:18, 6 October 2014 (UTC)

Raju Eknath Gaikwad (born 25 September 1990) is an Indian professional footballer who plays as a defender for I-League 3 club Diamond Harbour FC. Gaikwad primarily plays as a centre back, but can also play as a full back and is a long throw specialist.

== Career ==
=== Pailan Arrows ===
After spending time at Tata Football Academy Gaikwad signed for Pailan Arrows (then AIFF XI) in the I-League. He made his league debut for the club on 3 December 2010 against Prayag United at the Salt Lake Stadium which was also Pailan Arrows's first ever game in the I-League; Pailan lost 2–1.

=== East Bengal ===
In July 2011 Gaikwad signed for East Bengal after one season at Pailan and made his debut for the club on 4 February 2012 after missing the first few months of the season through injury.

=== Mohun Bagan A.C. ===
In June 2015 Gaikwad signed for Mohun Bagan from rival club East Bengal.

=== Kerala Blasters ===
Kerala Blasters signed Raju as a replacement for Sandesh Jhingan in the 2019–20 ISL season.

== International ==
Gaikwad made his debut for the India U23 on 23 February 2011 against Myanmar's U23s in the 2012 Olympic Qualifiers; India U23 won 2–1. He then made his senior debut for India on 21 March 2011 in the 2012 AFC Challenge Cup qualifiers against Chinese Tapei at the MBPJ Stadium in Petaling Jaya, Malaysia; India won 3–0. Gaikwad then won his first championship with India on 11 December 2011 when he helped India beat Afghanistan in the 2011 SAFF Cup. Gaikwad then went on to lead India to win the 2012 Nehru Cup when India managed to beat Cameroon's B team on 2 September 2012 at the Nehru Stadium in the Indian capital, Delhi.

== Career statistics ==
=== Club ===
As of 11 March 2023

Club	Season	Division	League		Cup		Other		AFC		Total	
Club	Season	Division	Apps	Goals	Apps	Goals	Apps	Goals	Apps	Goals	Apps	Goals
Pailan Arrows	2010–11	I-League	14	0	1 (Note: Appearance(s) in Federation Cup)	0	—		—		15	0
East Bengal	2011–12	I-League	0	0	3	0	2 (Note: Appearances in Calcutta Football League)	0	2 (Note: Appearance(s) in AFC Cup)	0	12	0
East Bengal	2012–13	I-League	9	0	2	0	6	1	3	0	20	1
East Bengal	2013–14	I-League	17	0	3	0	9 (Note: 4 Apps in Calcutta Football League and 5 Apps in 2012 IFA Shield)	0	—		29	0
East Bengal	2014–15	I-League	11	0	2	0	3	0	4	0	9	0
East Bengal	East Bengal total		37	0	10	0	20	1	9	0	70	3
Mumbai City (loan)	2014	Indian Super League	3	0	0	0	—		—		3	0
Mohun Bagan	2015–16	I-League	8	0	0	0	—		6 (Note: Appearance(s) in AFC Champions League)	0	14	0
Mohun Bagan	2016–17	I-League	6	0	2	0	—		5	0	13	0
Mohun Bagan	East Bengal total		14	0	2	0	0	0	11	0	27	0
Goa (loan)	2014	Indian Super League	9	0	0	0	—		—		9	0
Goa (loan)	2015	Indian Super League	14	0	0	0	—		—		14	0
Goa (loan)	Goa total		23	0	0	0	0	0	0	0	23	0
Mumbai City	2017–18	Indian Super League	15	0	2 (Note: Appearance(s) in Super Cup)	0	—		—		17	0
Jamshedpur	2018–19	Indian Super League	5	0	0	0	—		—		5	0
Kerala Blasters	2019–20	Indian Super League	12	0	0	0	—		—		12	0
East Bengal	2020–21	Indian Super League	7	0	0	0	—		—		7	0
East Bengal	2021–22	Indian Super League	12	0	0	0	—		—		12	0
East Bengal	East Bengal total		19	0	0	0	0	0	0	0	19	0
Churchill Brothers	2022–23	I-League	12	1	0	0	0	0	—		12	1
Delhi	2023–24	I-League	0	0	0	0	0	0	—		0	0
Career total			154	1	15	0	20	1	20	0	209	2

=== National team statistics ===
Statistics accurate as of 6 May 2015

India national team
Year	Apps	Goals
2011	9	0
2012	8	0
2013	4	0
2014	2	0
Total	23	0

== Honours ==
Tata Football Academy

- I-League U19: 2008

India

- SAFF Championship runner-up: 2013
- Nehru Cup: 2012

East Bengal

- Federation Cup: 2012
- Calcutta Football League: 2011–12, 2012–13, 2013–14, 2014–15
- IFA Shield (1): 2012

Mohun Bagan

- Federation Cup: 2015–16

Churchill Brothers

- Baji Rout Cup runner-up: 2022
