= 2011 Indian Super Cup =

- Event: 2011 Indian Super Cup
Salgaocar	East Bengal
0	0
- East Bengal won 9–8 on penalties
- Date: 18 October 2011
- Venue: Ambedkar Stadium, New Delhi
- Referee: Pratap Singh
- Attendance: 5,000

The 2011 Indian Super Cup was the 10th Indian Super Cup, an annual football match contested by the winners of the previous season's I-League and Federation Cup competitions. The match was between Salgaocar and East Bengal with East Bengal winning 9–8 on penalties. The match played at Ambedkar Stadium, New Delhi, on 18 October 2011.

== Background ==
This was Salgaocar's third time playing in this match (they won the first two times) and fifth for East Bengal (they won it two times as well).

== Match details ==
18 October 2011
7PM IST

Salgaocar	0–0	East Bengal
	Report
Penalties
(penalty scored) Edeh; (penalty scored) Sueoka; (penalty scored) Lamare; (penalty scored) Kumar; (penalty scored) Wadoo; (penalty scored) Fernandes; (penalty scored) Sabrosa; (penalty scored) T. Singh; (penalty missed) J. Singh	8–9	Ozbey (penalty scored); Gow (penalty scored); Robin Singh (penalty scored); Pradhan (penalty scored); Mathew (penalty scored); Paite (penalty scored); Chetri (penalty scored); Okpara (penalty scored); Roy (penalty scored)

Ambedkar Stadium, New Delhi
Referee: Pratap Singh

Salgaocar	East Bengal

SALGAOCAR:
GK	1	(India) Karanjit Singh	(yellow card) 89'
RB	20	(Brazil) Luciano Sabrosa (c)
CB	6	(India) Irungbam Khelemba Singh	(yellow card) 75'
CB	2	(India) Jaspal Singh
LB	7	(India) Tomba Singh	(yellow card) 40'
CM	25	(India) Rocus Lamare
CM	15	(India) Ishfaq Ahmed		(substituted off) 87'
CM	30	(India) Francis Fernandes
RW	14	(India) Biswajit Saha		(substituted off) 90'
LW	10	(Nigeria) Chidi Edeh
CF	11	(Japan) Ryuji Sueoka
Substitutes:
DF	5	(India) Mehrajuddin Wadoo		(substituted in) 87'
DF	23	(India) Rahul Kumar		(substituted in) 90'
Manager:
(Morocco) Karim Bencherifa

EAST BENGAL:
GK	30	(India) Gurpreet Singh Sandhu
RB	33	(India) Saikat Saha Roy	(yellow card) 60'
CB	5	(Nigeria) Uga Samuel Okpara (c)
CB	3	(India) Nirmal Chettri
LB	17	(India) Robert Lalthalma		(substituted off) 90'
RM	13	(India) Reisangmei Vashum	(yellow card) 40'
CM	7	(India) Sushanth Mathew
CM	18	(Nigeria) Penn Orji		(substituted off) 76'
LM	11	(India) Khemtang Paite		(substituted off) 85'
SS	23	(India) Robin Singh
CF	15	(Scotland) Alan Gow
Substitutes:
FW	20	(Australia) Tolgay Ozbey		(substituted in) 76'
MF	22	(India) Sanju Pradhan		(substituted in) 85'
DF	19	(India) Ravinder Singh		(substituted in) 90'
Manager:
(England) Trevor Morgan

MATCH OFFICIALS

- Assistant referees:

MAN OF THE MATCH

- Unknown

MATCH RULES

- 90 minutes.
- Penalty shootout if scores still level.
- Maximum of three substitutions.
