= Tolgay =

Tolgay is a Turkish given name for males. "Tol" means "gift" or "present" in Turkish, and the word "gay" means "swift" or "fast".

Therefore, Tolgay can be interpreted as "swift gift" or "fast present" in Turkish. Notable people with the surname include:

- Tolgay Arslan (born 1990), German-Turkish football player
- Tolgay Özbey (born 1986), Australian-Turkish football player
