= Gurwinder Singh =

Indian footballer

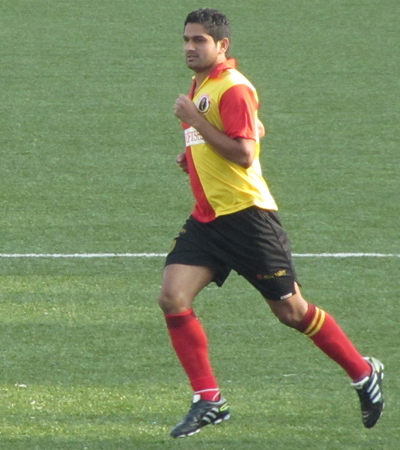

Personal information
- Full name: Gurwinder Singh
- Date of birth: 16 April 1986 (age 40)
- Place of birth: Jalandhar, Punjab, India
- Height: 1.83 m (6 ft 0 in)
- Position: Defender

Youth career
- 2004–2005: JCT

Senior career*
Years	Team	Apps	(Gls)
2005–2010	JCT	67	(19)
2010–2018	East Bengal	81	(12)
2014	→ Kerala Blasters (loan)	11	(0)
2015	→ Kerala Blasters (loan)	3	(0)
2016	→ Kerala Blasters (loan)	2	(0)
2018–2019	NorthEast United	8	(0)
2019–2020	East Bengal	2	(0)

International career^{‡}
2013–2017	India	10	(1)
- * Club domestic league appearances and goals as of 06:22, 3 March 2020 (UTC) ‡ National team caps and goals as of 16:09, 19 March 2015 (UTC)

Gurwinder Singh (born 16 April 1986) is a former Indian professional footballer who played as a defender.

== Career ==
Gurwinder started his senior career with JCT in 2005 after passing out from their youth academy, where he spent a year. Gurwinder left JCT to join East Bengal in 2010. Gurwinder was loaned out to Kerala Blasters FC for the 2014 Indian Super League and was a regular for the Kerala-based team, making 11 appearances including the final match of the competition. Gurwinder is currently represented by UK based Football Agency - Inventive Sports.

He was signed by Northeast United FC for 2018–19 season. He was fondly called as 'Gurwinder Paaji' by his teammates.

== International ==
After a great season with [East Bengal F.C.|East Bengal], Singh was called up to the India national football team preparatory camp in June 2011 but didn't make any appearances. He made his India debut in 2013, and has gone on to make 10 appearances for the national team. However, he has fallen out of favor since 2015 and hasn't made an appearance since.

== Honours ==
East Bengal

- I-League (runners): 2010-11, 2011-12, 2013-14
- Federation Cup (winner): 2010, 2012
- Calcutta Football League (winner): 2010, 2011, 2012, 2013, 2014, 2015, 2016, 2017
- IFA Shield (winner): 2012
- Super Cup (winner): 2011
- Mohammedan Sporting Platinum Jubilee Cup (winner): 2010

India

- Nehru Cup: 2012

Individual

- NorthEast United FC Defender of the Season: 2018-19
