= Uga Okpara =

Nigerian footballer

Ugah Opara
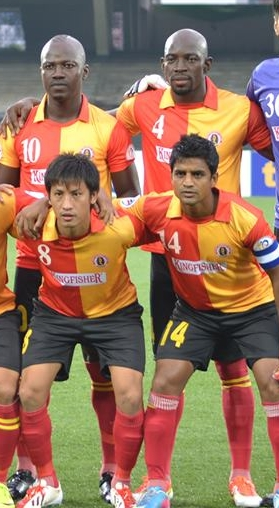
- Okpara in 2013 (top right)

Personal information
- Full name: Uga Samweli Okpara
- Date of birth: 28 August 1982 (age 44)
- Place of birth: Nigeria
- Height: 1.83 m (6 ft 0 in)
- Position: Defender

Senior career*
Years	Team	Apps	(Gls)
2002–2009	Enyimba		
2009– 2014	East Bengal	188	(7)

International career
2004–2007	Nigeria Beach Soccer		
- * Club domestic league appearances and goals as of 09:20, 20 May 2014 (UTC)

Uga Samweli Okpara (born 28 August 1982) is a Nigerian football player.

== Career ==
Okpara began his career with Enyimba International F.C. and was an import member of the team that won the 2002 and 2003 African Champions Leagues. On 15 October 2009, he left Enyimba International F.C. and joined Indian I-League team East Bengal. He became the rock solid defender for the Red and Gold in I-League, Fed Cup and the AFC Cup as well. He was voted as the best defender in 2012-13 season

== Statistics ==
As of 30 May 2014

Club	Season	League		Federation Cup		AFC Cup		CFL		Total	
Club	Season	App	Goals	App	Goals	App	Goals	App	Goals	App	Goals
East Bengal	2012–13	21	0	5	0	6	0	5	0	37	0
East Bengal	2013–14	9	0	3	0	4	1	1	0	17	1
Career total		30	0	8	0	10	1	6	0	54	1

== International career ==
For two years, Okpara was the Vice Captain of the Nigeria national beach soccer team and represented the team at FIFA Beach Soccer World Cup 2005 and 2007.

== Honours ==
=== Club ===
Enyimba International F.C.

- Nigerian Premier League: 2002, 2003, 2005, 2007
- Nigerian FA Cup: 2005
- Nigerian Super Cup: 2003
- CAF Champions League: 2003, 2004
- CAF Super Cup: 2004, 2005

East Bengal F.C.

- Federation Cup: 2009–10, 2010, 2012
- Super Cup: 2011
- IFA Shield: 2012
- Calcutta Football League: 2010, 2011, 2012, 2013
