= 2011–12 in Indian football =

Football in India
- Season: 2011–12

Men's football
- I-League: Dempo
- I-League 2nd Div.: ONGC
- Federation Cup: Salgaocar
- Super Cup: East Bengal

The 2011–12 season is the 124th competitive association football season in India since the inaugural Durand Cup in 1888. The season began on the 8 September 2011 with the Federation Cup.

== Promotion and Relegation ==
Teams relegated from I-League

- ONGC
- JCT

Teams promoted to I-League

- Shillong Lajong
- Sporting Clube de Goa

== Events of the season ==
6 May 2011: Shillong Lajong make the first transfer of the season by transferring Anil Gurung to Nepali club Manang Marshyangdi Club.

2 June 2011: Mohun Bagan make the first big signing and maybe the biggest signing of the season by signing three time I-League golden boot winner Odafe Onyeka Okolie to a $320,000 a year deal.

7 June 2011: Chirag Computers expel their relationship with United Sports Club.

13 June 2011: Churchill Brothers make three of the next big signings of the season by signing both Roberto Mendes Silva and India internationals Jagpreet Singh and Xavier Vijay Kumar.

18 June 2011: Dempo make the fifth biggest signing of the season by signing Indian footballer golden boot runner-up Anil Kumar from Viva Kerala FC.

22 June 2011: Churchill Brothers make the sixth biggest signing of the season by signing Gabon international Henry Antchouet while Shillong Lajong make the seventh biggest signing of the season by signing Johnny Menyongar from United Sikkim.

29 June 2011: Viva Kerala FC rename themselves as Chirag United Club Kerala after signing a sponsorship deal.

7 July 2011: Pune retain Jeje Lalpekhlua from Indian Arrows after a one-year loan spell.

3 August 2011: United Sports Club is renamed Prayag United S.C. after signing a six-year sponsorship deal.

29 September 2011: Salgaocar win the 2011 Federation Cup with a 3–1 victory over last season's winners East Bengal.

18 October 2011: East Bengal win the 2011 Indian Super Cup over Salgaocar 9–8 in penalties after the match ended 0-0.

10 April 2012: HAL is officially relegated from the I-League after losing 4–6 to Pune at the Bangalore Football Stadium. This was further made true when Mumbai drew with Pailan Arrows. This means that on April 10 that HAL was 13 points below Mumbai who occupied the last 2012–13 I-League spot and with HAL at 23 games meant that HAL could only win 9 points.

=== Clubs Removed ===
- JCT, folded due to financial difficulties.

=== Name Changes ===
- Chirag United → United Sports Club
- Viva Kerala FC → Chirag United Club Kerala
- United Sports Club → Prayag United

== Men's national football team ==
=== 2011 SAFF Cup ===
3 December 2011 SAFF Cup	India	1 – 1	Afghanistan	New Delhi, India
	Chhetri 10'	Report	Arezou 5'	Stadium: Jawaharlal Nehru Stadium

5 December 2011 SAFF Cup	India	5 – 0	Bhutan	New Delhi, India
	Nabi 29'; Miranda 44', 58'; Chhetri 69', 84'	Report		Stadium: Jawaharlal Nehru Stadium; Referee: Sukhbir Singh

7 December 2011 SAFF Cup	India	3 – 0	Sri Lanka	New Delhi, India
	Lalpekhlua 50'; Chhetri 69'	Report	Warakagoda 90' (o.g.)	Stadium: Jawaharlal Nehru Stadium

9 December 2011 SAFF Cup	India	3 – 1	Maldives	New Delhi, India
3:00 PM IST	Nabi 24'; Chhetri 70' (pen.); Chhetri 90+1'	Report	Shamweel Qasim 32'	Stadium: Jawaharlal Nehru Stadium

11 December 2011 SAFF Cup	India	4 – 0	Afghanistan	New Delhi, India
18:00 IST	Chhetri 70' (pen.); Miranda 79'; Lalpekhlua 80'; S. Kumar 90+5'	Report		Stadium: Jawaharlal Nehru Stadium; Referee: Sukhbir Singh

=== Friendlies ===
10 July International Friendly	Maldives	1 – 1	India	Male, Maldives
			Chhetri 18'	Stadium: Rasmee Dhandu Stadium

17 July International Friendly	Qatar	1 – 2	India	Doha, Qatar
			Chhetri 16'; Kumar Singh 73'	Stadium: Jassim Bin Hamad Stadium

21 August International Friendly	Trinidad and Tobago	3 – 0	India	Port of Spain, Trinidad and Tobago
				Stadium: Hasely Crawford Stadium

24 August International Friendly	Guyana	2 – 1	India	Providence, Guyana
			Dias 36'	Stadium: Providence Stadium

13 November International Friendly	India	1 – 1	Malaysia	Guwahati, India
	Nabi 88'	Report	Safiq 42'	Stadium: Indira Gandhi Athletic Stadium; Attendance: 20,000

16 November International Friendly	India	3 – 2	Malaysia	Kolkata, India
	Chhetri 39', 53'; Lalpekhlua 47'	Report	Safee 45', 60'	Stadium: Salt Lake Stadium; Attendance: 2,500

29 November International Friendly	India	0 – 5	Zambia	Goa, India
		Report	Chisenga 15'; Mushumba 55'; Bwalya 69', 73', 90'	Stadium: Fatorda Stadium

10 January International Friendly	India	0 – 4	(Germany) FC Bayern Munich	New Delhi, India
18:00 IST		Report	Gomez 14'; Müller 29'; Müller 38'; Schweinsteiger 43'	Stadium: Jawaharlal Nehru Stadium; Attendance: 45,000; Referee: Santosh Kumar

23 February International Friendly	Oman	5 – 1	India	Muscat, Oman
15:00 IST	Mohammed 5'; Ajmi 7', 58'; Rabia 87'; Thuwaini 90'	Report	Abranches 64'	Stadium: Sultan Qaboos Sports Complex

27 January International Friendly	Azerbaijan	3–0	India	Dubai, United Arab Emirates

==== 2014 FIFA World Cup Qualification ====
23 July FIFA qualif.	United Arab Emirates	3 – 0	India	Al-Ain, United Arab Emirates
	Al Kamali 21' (pen.); Al Shehhi 29' (pen.); Al Hammadi 82'	Report		Stadium: Sheikh Khalifa International Stadium; Attendance: 3,179; Referee: Banjar Al Dosari (Qatar)

28 July FIFA qualif.	India	2 – 2	United Arab Emirates	New Delhi, India
	Lalpekhula 73'; G.Singh 90+2'	Report	Al Shehhi 39'; Al-Wehaibi 71'	Stadium: Ambedkar Stadium; Attendance: 13,000; Referee: Abdul Malik Bashir (Singapore)

=== U-20 Team ===
==== 2012 AFC U-19 Championship qualifiers ====
31 October 2011	India	3 – 1	Turkmenistan	Takhti Stadium, Tehran, Iran
18:30 IRST	Fernandes 39'; Malsawmfela 60'; Das 82'	Report	Myradov 58'	Attendance: 25; Referee: Ali Al-Qaysi (Iraq)

2 November 2011	Iran	3 – 0	India	Takhti Stadium, Tehran, Iran
18:30 IRST	Abdollqhzadeh 8'; Jahan 67' 81'

4 November 2011	Uzbekistan	2 – 1	India	Takhti Stadium, Tehran, Iran
15:30 IRST	Vladimir Kozak 32' 88'		Pronoy Halder 60'	Attendance: 25

8 November 2011	Pakistan	2 – 1	India	Takhti Stadium, Tehran, Iran
15:30 IRST

== I-League ==
Pos	Team	Pld	W	D	L	GF	GA	GD	Pts	Qualification or relegation
1	Dempo (C)	26	18	3	5	59	21	+38	57	
2	East Bengal	26	15	6	5	46	22	+24	51	2013 AFC Cup Group stage (Note: East Bengal, the winner of the 2012 Indian Federation Cup, qualified for the 2013 AFC Cup.)
3	Churchill Brothers	26	14	6	6	47	28	+19	48	2013 AFC Cup Group stage (Note: Dempo refused to enter the 2013 AFC Cup, so they were replaced by Churchill Brothers.)
4	Mohun Bagan	26	13	8	5	51	32	+19	47	
5	Pune	26	13	7	6	44	34	+10	46	
6	Salgaocar	26	12	8	6	32	19	+13	44	
7	Prayag United	26	11	9	6	41	32	+9	42	
8	Sporting Goa	26	11	7	8	53	43	+10	40	
9	Air India	26	9	5	12	30	37	−7	32	
10	Shillong Lajong	26	7	7	12	24	44	−20	28	
11	Mumbai	26	7	3	16	31	52	−21	24	
12	Chirag United Kerala (R)	26	6	2	18	28	50	−22	20	Relegation to 2013 I-League 2nd Division (Note: Pailan Arrows were not relegated in the season as they were a developmental team.)
13	Pailan Arrows	26	2	10	14	17	40	−23	16	
14	HAL (R)	26	1	5	20	19	68	−49	8	Relegation to 2013 I-League 2nd Division

Source: IndiaFooty.com
Rules for classification: 1) points; 2) goal difference; 3) number of goals scored.
(C) Champions; (R) Relegated

== See also ==
- 2011–12 I-League
- 2011 Indian Federation Cup
- India national football team
