= Sanju Pradhan =

Indian footballer (born 1989)

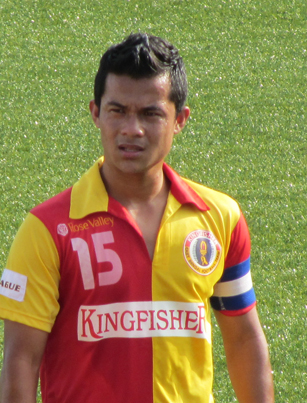
- Pradhan captaining East Bengal in 2011

Personal information
- Full name: Sanju Pradhan
- Date of birth: 11 March 1989 (age 37)
- Place of birth: West Sikkim, Sikkim, India
- Height: 1.78 m (5 ft 10 in)
- Position: Winger

Youth career
- 1999–2006: Namchi Sports Hostel
- 2006: Sports Academy of Sikkim

Senior career*
Years	Team	Apps	(Gls)
2006–2008	Air India		
2008–2013	East Bengal	139	(15)
2013–2014	Dempo	8	(0)
2014	Atletico de Kolkata	11	(0)
2015	Salgaocar	6	(0)
2015–2016	NorthEast United	11	(0)
2016	→ East Bengal (loan)	9	(0)
2016	FC Pune City	7	(0)
2017	DSK Shivajians	15	(2)
2017–2019	Mumbai City	26	(0)
2019–2021	Minerva Punjab	25	(1)
2021	Bengaluru United	7	(1)
2022	Bhawanipore	8	(0)

International career^{‡}
2000	India U14		
2003–2004	India U17		
2012–2016	India	5	(0)
- * Club domestic league appearances and goals ‡ National team caps and goals as of 31 December 2016

Sanju Pradhan (born 11 March 1989) is an Indian professional footballer who plays as a winger.

Pradhan has won 2 Federation Cups in 2009–10 and 2012 while he also has won 1 Indian Super Cup with the club in 2011. He also represented India internationally. Pradhan recently became the Technical Partner for Kipsta (Decathlon Sports India) in 2016.

== Career ==
=== Early career ===
Hailing from a Nepali Newar family, Pradhan was born to D.B. Pradhan and Sarda Pradhan on 11 March 1989 in the village of Sombaria which is located in the West Sikkim district of the Indian state of Sikkim which is located in North East India. Pradhan gained a liking to football at a young age through watching people in his village play the game in their free time. During his child years Pradhan had to play at the school level but because his school did not have a team he had to play for other teams. He then attended the trials for the "Search for more Bhaichungs" at the West Sikkim district headquarters. After impressing Pradhan was selected to attend the statewide trials for the program in Gangtok where he passed as well and was one of 30 boys selected from the trial. In April 1999 the boys were sent to the Namchi Sports Hostel Football Academy where they participated in the Subroto Cup every year. Pradhan was also selected by the Sikkim football team at junior level. In 2006 Pradhan joined the Sports Academy of Sikkim after he and the other boys were sent there. That same year Pradhan, along with teammate Nirmal Chettri, was invited for a trial with Prayag United S.C. of Kolkata but neither player passed the trial. Then in October 2006, after a great performance in the All India Governors Gold Cup Football Tournament for the Sports Academy of Sikkim, Pradhan was scouted by then Air India FC coach Bimal Ghosh and was offered a chance to join the current I-League team. After going through then Sports Minister, P.S. Golay, Pradhan signed with Air India.

=== East Bengal ===
After spending two years at Air India FC Pradhan signed for East Bengal F.C. who also play in the I-League in 2008. Pradhan scored his first goal for the Red and Gold on 7 February 2009 against his old club now, Air India, in which he scored in the 81st to guarantee East Bengal a 3–1 victory over the Airmen. Pradhan then made his Asian international debut in the 2010 AFC Cup against Al-Ittihad of Syria on 10 March 2010 in which East Bengal lost 1–4. Pradhan then went on to score his second ever goal for East Bengal on 29 March 2010 against Salgaocar F.C. at the Fatorda Stadium which turned out to be East Bengal's only goal in another 1–4 loss. He then scored again on 23 May 2010 against Churchill Brothers in which East Bengal drew 2–2. Pradhan did not score again for East Bengal until 29 January 2011 in which he scored again against Churchill Brothers in yet another 2–2 draw. Pradhan then scored probably his most memorable goal on 6 February 2011 in which he scored in the 8th minute from the penalty spot against historic rivals of East Bengal, Mohun Bagan A.C. at the Salt Lake Stadium in front of 60,000 fans which led East Bengal to a 1–1 draw. Then in 2011 Pradhan was made captain of East Bengal and soon he shown why after he scored 2 goals in 2 matches for East Bengal; the first coming on 2 November 2011 against Mumbai F.C. and the second against Shillong Lajong F.C. on 6 November 2011. Pradhan then scored again for East Bengal on 30 April 2012 against Sporting Clube de Goa at the Salt Lake Stadium in which East Bengal won 3–0. In 2011, he was made club captain.

Pradhan then started the 2012-13 I-League on the a regular substitute but then he sustained an injury in November before returning with a bang on 30 December 2012 in which Pradhan started his first I-League match of the season and scored his first brace of the season as East Bengal went out 3–0 winners over Pailan Arrows at the Kalyani Stadium.

=== Dempo ===
Sanju Pradhan joined Dempo on loan from IMG Reliance on 30 December 2013.

=== Salgaocar ===
In 2015 Pradhan joined Salgaocar on a season long deal, also getting to be re-united with his schoolmate and childhood friend Bikash Jairu.

=== Return to East Bengal ===
In December 2015 it was announced that Pradhan would be returning on loan to his former club for the 2016 season.

=== Mumbai City ===
In 2017, Pradhan joined Mumbai City FC and became the first person to play for four different ISL clubs. He stayed with the club for the following season.

== Career statistics ==
=== International ===
As of 28 November 2015

India national team
Year	Apps	Goals
2012	3	0
2015	2	0
Total	5	0

== Honours ==
East Bengal

- Federation Cup: 2009–10, 2012
- Indian Super Cup: 2011
- IFA Shield: 2012
- Calcutta Premier Division: 2010, 2011

Atlético de Kolkata

- Indian Super League 2014

Bhawanipore

- Naihati Gold Cup: 2022
- CFL Premier Division A runner-up: 2022

India

- SAFF Championship: 2015
- Nehru Cup: 2012

Sporting positions
Preceded by Saumik Dey	Kingfisher East Bengal captain 2011–2013	Succeeded by Mehtab Hussain
