= 2010 Indian Super Cup =

Football match

- Event: 2010 Indian Super Cup
Dempo	East Bengal
3	1
- Dempo defeated East Bengal 3-1
- Date: 2 November 2010
- Venue: Tau Devi Lal Stadium, Gurgaon

The 2010 Indian Super Cup was the 9th Indian Super Cup, an annual football match contested by the winners of the previous season's I-League and Federation Cup competitions. The match was between Dempo and East Bengal with Dempo winning 3-1. The match was played in Gurgaon, In 2010. The Man of the Match was Bryan Cohen of Dempo.
