= Jaspal Parmar =

Indian footballer

Jaspal Singh
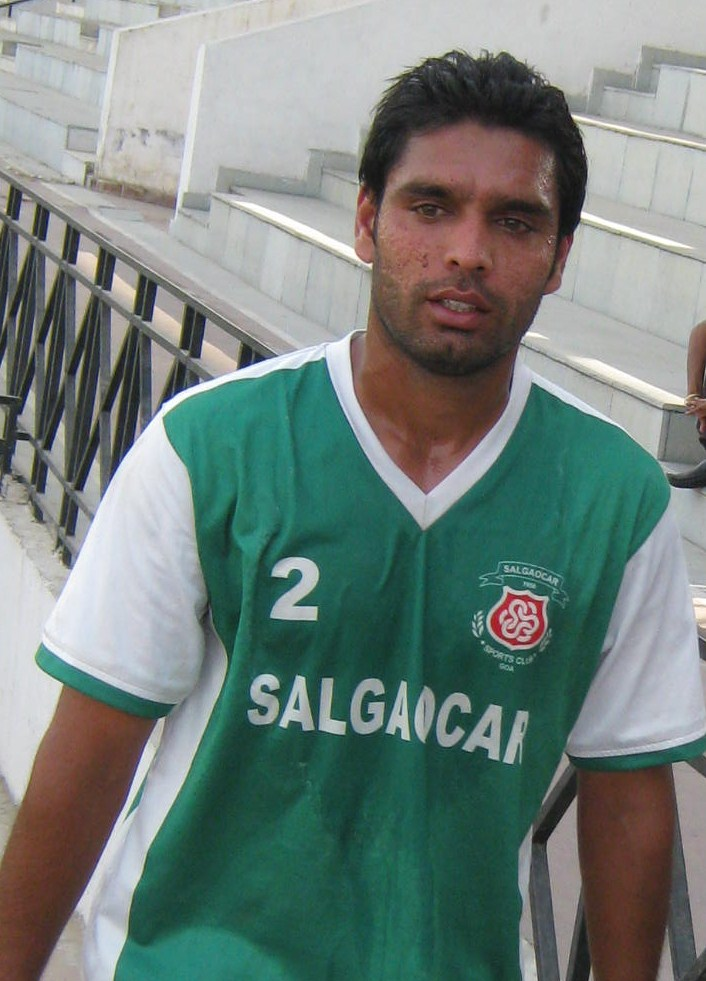

Personal information
- Full name: Jaspal Parmar Singh
- Date of birth: 6 August 1984 (age 42)
- Place of birth: Hoshiarpur, Punjab, India
- Height: 1.70 m (5 ft 7 in)
- Position: Defender

Senior career*
Years	Team	Apps	(Gls)
2006–2010	JCT		
2010–2012	Salgaocar	36	(1)
2012–2013	East Bengal		

International career
2011	India	3	(0)
- * Club domestic league appearances and goals

Jagpal Singh (born 6 August 1984, in Punjab) is an Indian former professional football player who played as a defender.
