= Rahul Kumar (footballer) =

Indian footballer (1985–2021)

Personal information
- Full name: Rahul Kumar
- Date of birth: 25 March 1985
- Place of birth: Chandigarh, India
- Date of death: 20 May 2021 (aged 36)
- Place of death: India
- Height: 5 ft 11 in (1.81 m)
- Position: Defender

Senior career*
Years	Team	Apps	(Gls)
2007–2010	Pune		
2010	Mohun Bagan		
2011	Chirag United		
2012–	Salgaocar		
- Southern Samity
–2016	Churchill Brothers		
- * Club domestic league appearances and goals as of 04:55, 21 May 2021 (UTC)

Rahul Kumar (25 March 1985 – 20 May 2021) was an Indian professional footballer who played as a defender. He began his career with upstart club Pune in 2007 before moving to Kolkata and signing with Mohun Bagan. He spent one season with Mohun Bagan before signing with city rivals Chirag United. The next year, he moved to Goa and signed with Salgaocar before ending his career with Churchill Brothers.

== Career ==
Born in Chandigarh, Kumar began his career playing in school tournaments before representing Punjab in the Santosh Trophy in 2005. His performance during the Santosh Trophy led to him signing with new I-League 2nd Division club Pune prior to their inaugural 2008 season. He made his debut for the club in their debut match on 26 March 2008 against Hindustan Aeronautics Limited, starting in the 2–1 victory.

In April 2009, Kumar was part of the Pune side which earned promotion to the I-League, the top flight of Indian football, following the 2009 season. After one season in the I-League with Pune, Kumar signed with Kolkata club Mohun Bagan prior to the start of the 2010–11 season. Following the season though, Kumar left and joined Chirag United. He spent a season with club before moving to Salgaocar.

Later in his career, Kumar signed with Southern Samity and Churchill Brothers. He retired in 2016 due to a physical illness.

== Death ==
On 20 May 2021, Kumar died at the age of 36. Reports indicated that Kumar had been suffering from liver cancer and had recently contracted COVID-19.
