= Jayanta Paul =

Indian footballer (born 1992)

Personal information
- Date of birth: 30 December 1992 (age 33)
- Place of birth: West Bengal, India
- Height: 1.81 m (5 ft 11 1/2 in)
- Position: Goalkeeper

Team information
- Current team: United S.C. (on loan from East Bengal)
- Number: 27

Youth career
- 2010–2012: East Bengal

Senior career*
Years	Team	Apps	(Gls)
2012–	East Bengal	0	(0)
2014– (on loan)	United	0	(0)

International career
2007–2008	India U16		
- * Club domestic league appearances and goals as of 20 January 2014

Jayanta Paul (born 30 December 1992 in West Bengal) is an Indian professional footballer who plays as a goalkeeper for United S.C. on loan from East Bengal in the I-League.

== Career ==
He was a regular first choice goalkeeper for East Bengal U-19 squad before he signed for senior team of East Bengal.

=== United ===
Paul signed for United S.C. in January 2014 on loan from East Bengal. He made his debut on 14 January 2014 in the Indian Federation Cup match against Churchill Brothers at Jawaharlal Nehru Stadium, Kochi in which he played the whole match as United lost the match 2–1.

== International ==
Jayanta was part of India U-16 in 2008 AFC U-16 Championship held in Tashkent.

== Career statistics ==
As of 20 January 2014

Club	Season	League			Federation Cup		Durand Cup		AFC		Total		
Club	Season	Apps	Goals	Apps	Goals	Apps	Goals	Apps	Goals	Apps	Goals		
United (loan)	2013–14	0	0	3	0	0	0	-	-	3	0		
United (loan)	Career total			0	0	3	0	0	0	0	0	3	0
