= Robert Lalthlamuana =

Indian footballer

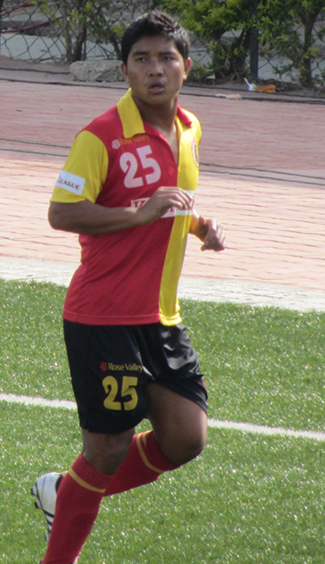
- Lalthlamuana with East Bengal

Personal information
- Date of birth: 4 September 1988 (age 38)
- Place of birth: Mizoram, India
- Height: 1.72 m (5 ft 7 1/2 in)
- Position: Left back

Youth career
- Tata FA
- 2006–2008: Churchill Brothers

Senior career*
Years	Team	Apps	(Gls)
2008–2011	Churchill Brothers	5	(0)
2011–2017	East Bengal	66	(0)
2014	→ Delhi Dynamos (loan)	3	(0)
2015	→ Delhi Dynamos (loan)	3	(0)
2016	→ Atlético de Kolkata (loan)	9	(0)
2017–2019	NorthEast United	24	(0)
Total		110	(0)

International career^{‡}
2010	India U23	3	(0)
2011–2019	India	2	(0)
- * Club domestic league appearances and goals as of 05:16, 28 January 2019 (UTC) ‡ National team caps and goals as of 09:09, 10 March 2015 (UTC)

Robert Lalthlamuana is a retired Indian football player who had formerly played in left-back position for NorthEast United.

== Career ==
=== Churchill Brothers ===
After graduating from the Tata Football Academy, Robert started his footballing career with I-League club Churchill Brothers in 2008. He would go on to have a successful time at the Goan clubs, winning the I-League in 2008-09 season and the Durand Cup in 2009.

=== East Bengal ===
In June 2011, Robert signed with East Bengal of Kolkata. Robert was an important part of the East Bengal squad that won the Federation Cup in 2012 and the IFA shield in 2012.

Robert represented Delhi Dynamos FC of the Indian Super League on loan from East Bengal for the 2014 edition. In June 2015, Delhi Dynamos retained him for next season ISL along with 4 more players.

=== NorthEast United ===
On 23 July 2017, NorthEast United has signed Robert as their fourth pick in 2017–18 ISL Players Draft. He captained his team in the first match of the season against Jamshedpur.

== International ==
After a good season at Churchill Brothers, Robert was called up to the India national football team preparatory camp in June and made his debut against Maldives on 10 July 2011 coming off the bench.

== Career statistics ==
As of 12 March 2016

Club	Season	League			League Cup		Domestic Cup		AFC		Total	
Club	Season	Division	Apps	Goals	Apps	Goals	Apps	Goals	Apps	Goals	Apps	Goals
East Bengal	2011–12	I-League	4	1	0	0	0	0	4	0	8	1
East Bengal	2012–13	I-League	9	0	0	0	0	0	5	0	14	0
East Bengal	2013–14	I-League	14	0	2	0	0	0	—	—	16	0
East Bengal	2014–15	I-League	14	0	4	0	0	0	3	0	21	0
East Bengal	2014–15	I-League	3	0	0	0	0	0	0	0	3	0
Delhi Dynamos FC (loan)	2014	ISL	3	0	—	—	—	—	—	—	3	0
Career total			47	1	6	0	0	0	12	0	65	1

== Honours ==
India U23

- SAFF Championship: 2009
