= Sushanth Mathew =

Indian footballer and manager

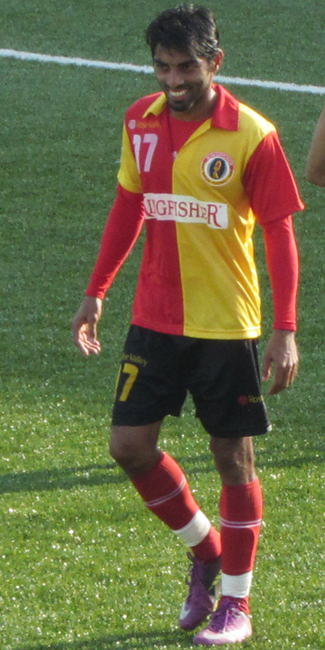
- Mathew with East Bengal in 2011

Personal information
- Date of birth: 18 May 1981 (age 45)
- Place of birth: Wayanad, Kerala, India
- Height: 1.74 m (5 ft 9 in)
- Positions: Defender; midfielder

Youth career
- 1997–2001: FC Kochin

Senior career*
Years	Team	Apps	(Gls)
2001–2004	Vasco	61	(5)
2004–2010	Mahindra United	36	(8)
2010–2012	East Bengal	77	(4)
2012–2013	Mohun Bagan	4	(0)
2013–2014	Rangdajied United	4	(1)
2014–2015	Kerala Blasters FC	4	(1)
2015	FC Pune City	7	(1)
2016	NEROCA FC	6	(0)
2017−2019	Gokulam Kerala FC	8	(0)
Total		207	(20)

Managerial career
- 2020–: Technical Director & Coaching for Academies
- * Club domestic league appearances and goals as of 19 November 2018

Sushanth Mathew (born 18 May 1981) is a retired Indian professional footballer who played as a defender or midfielder, who currently works as a technical director and coach in academies.

== Career ==
Sushanth was born in the Ambalavayal, Wayanad, Kerala. He showed glimpses of his skills for his school team, from where he pursued his footballing career to a local club named the Dyna FC. He graduated from Farook College, Calicut, where he represented the university team.

He was called for the Kerala Santhosh Trophy camp at Kochi. This helped him to join the FC Cochin in the season 1997–98.

He played for three years for FC Kochin, playing alongside his boyhood hero I. M. Vijayan. He was acquired by Vasco S.C. Another three years of consistent performances at the goan club earned him a move to the Mahindra United, for whom he played for six years. He then moved to East Bengal in 2010, remaining two years. He then joined Mohun Bagan for the 2012–13 season, playing four I-League matches.

=== Rangdajied United ===
On 13 January 2014 Mathew signed for Rangdajied United F.C. on loan from IMG RELIANCE. He made his debut in the I-League on 11 February 2014 against Churchill Brothers at the Tilak Maidan Stadium in which he started and played until the 89th minute before being replaced by Sandesh Gadkari as Rangdajied lost the match 1–0.

=== Kerala Blasters ===
He became the first Malayali player to be drafted into the Kochi-based squad on day one of the draft picks for the inaugural edition of the Indian Super League. Trevor Morgan who mentored him in East Bengal was influential in selecting him.

Sushanth played just 56 minutes over four matches for the Blasters in the inaugural season.

However, on 13 December 2014, Sushanth scored a long-range goal for Kerala Blasters in the first leg of semi-final match against Chennaiyin FC at Jawaharlal Nehru Stadium, Kochi, his "blitz curler" goal made him an instant hero and propelled the team to the finals. It is considered to be one of the best goals in the history of Kerala Blasters as well as Indian Super League.

After his retirement, ISL media team had an interview with him, below is an excerpt about the strike:

"I must say I have a lot of fantastic memories from my football career - sharing dressing rooms and playing with world football stars, etc. But ‘that’ goal, I will cherish always. That goal made me a hero to the Kerala fans, I so adore, almost overnight. I still get messages from fans and well-wishers saying that they still have goosebumps whenever they watch that goal. A lot of them keep insisting that it is the best goal in Hero ISL so far. I feel very fortunate to be remembered so fondly."

=== FC Pune City ===
In July 2015, Mathew was drafted to play for FC Pune City in the 2015 Indian Super League.

After playing just thrice for the Stallions, he suffered a horrific injury following a late tackle by former France international Florent Malouda. The injury kept Mathew out for the season and marked the end of his time in the Hero ISL.

=== Gokulam FC ===
In January 2017, Sushanth joined the Kerala-based I-League club Gokulam Kerala FC.
