= Saumik Dey =

Indian footballer

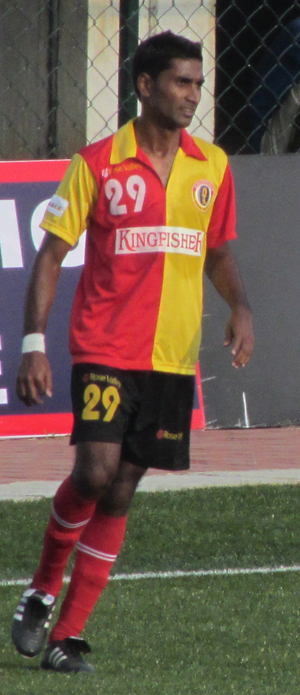

Personal information
- Full name: Saumik Dey
- Date of birth: 18 October 1984 (age 42)
- Place of birth: Hindmotor, India
- Height: 1.78 m (5 ft 10 in)
- Position: Left back

Team information
- Current team: East Bengal
- Number: 29

Senior career*
| Years | Team | Apps | (Gls) |
| 2006 | Tollygunge Agragami | | |
| 2006–2016 | East Bengal | 279 | (10) |
| 2014 | → Kerala Blasters (loan) | 10 | (0) |
| 2015 | → Kerala Blasters (loan) | 8 | (0) |
| Total | | 297 | (10) |

International career^{‡}
| 2013–2015 | India | 7 | (0) |
- * Club domestic league appearances and goals as of 09:41, 10 July 2015 (UTC) ‡ National team caps and goals as of 15:46, 17 March 2015 (UTC)

Saumik Dey (born 18 October 1984) is an Indian former footballer who used to play as a left-back for East Bengal. He captained the club to the victories in the 32nd Federation Cup and the Calcutta Football League in 2010.

== International ==
Saumik made his senior national team debut against Nepal on 12 March 2015.

Sporting positions
| Preceded by Abhra Mondal | Kingfisher East Bengal captain 2010–2011 | Succeeded by Sanju Pradhan |
