= 2012 IFA Shield =

২০১২ আইএফএ শিল্ড

Tournament details
- Country: India
- Date: 3–16 March
- Teams: 12

Final positions
- Champions: East Bengal (28th title)
- Runners-up: Prayag United

2012 IFA Shield began on 3 March 2012. Pune FC along with six other I-League teams participated in the 116th edition. Brazilian Série A famous team Botafogo came here to participate in the 116th edition of the Shield.

== Groups ==
Group A	Group B	Group C	Group D
East Bengal	(Brazil) Botafogo	Pune FC	Prayag United
Shillong Lajong	Chirag United Kerala	Pailan Arrows	Mumbai
Bhawanipore	Southern Samity	Ar-Hima	Aryan

Pune FC were held by minnows Pailan Arrows, while Southern Samity stunned I-League side United Kerala. East Bengal pip Bhawanipore FC 2–1 in the 116th IFA Shield opener at the Yuba Bharati Krirangan in Kolkata.

Pune FC Won 3–0 over Ar Hima FC.

== Knockouts ==
East Bengal won the trophy by pipping Prayag united by 4–2 via a tie-breaker.

Semi–finals
D1	Prayag United	1
B1	(Brazil) Botafogo	0
A1	East Bengal	1
C1	Pailan Arrows	0

Final
D1	Prayag United	0 (2)
A1	East Bengal (p)	0 (4)

=== Final ===
16 March 2012
14:30 IST

East Bengal	0–0 (a.e.t.)	Prayag United
	Report
Penalties
Ozbey (penalty scored); Khanthang Paite (penalty scored); Robin Singh (penalty scored); Subodh Kumar (penalty scored)	4–2	(penalty missed) James Singh; (penalty missed) Bello Razaq; (penalty scored) Jayanta Sen; (penalty scored) Yusif Yakubu

Salt Lake Stadium, Kolkata
Attendance: 30,000 (est.)
Referee: Santosh Kumar (Kerala)

East Bengal	Prayag United
