= Indian Super Cup (1997–2011) =

- Founded: 1997; 29 years ago
- Abolished: 2011; 15 years ago
- Region: India
- Teams: 2
- Last champions: East Bengal (3rd title)
- Most championships: East Bengal (3 titles)

The Indian Super Cup was Indian football's annual match contested between the champions of the previous National Football League or the I-League season and the holders of the Federation Cup, usually held at a neutral venue. If the League champions also won the Federation Cup then the league runners-up would provide the opposition. The fixture was usually considered the curtain raiser to the Indian football domestic season.

The fixture was last contested in 2011 when East Bengal won the cup for the third time, defeating Salgaocar 9–8 on penalties.

== History ==
The Indian Super Cup was started in 1997 by the All India Football Federation as a playoff between the then National Football League champions and Federation Cup holders. The first edition took place that year between the 1996–97 NFL (first season in league history) champions JCT Mills and 1996 Federation Cup holders East Bengal. After the match ended 0–0, East Bengal won the first Super Cup on penalties 4–2. Salgaocar proceeded to win the next two editions of the Super Cup before the tournament was suspended for three seasons. When the cup returned in 2003 Mahindra United defeated East Bengal on penalties 4–3 after drawing them 1–1. The cup was then held seven more times before being suspended and hasn't been played since the 2011 fixture.

== Records ==
- The most successful side in the Indian Super Cup is East Bengal. The club have won the annual fixture three times.
- The biggest victory in the Super Cup was during the 2007 fixture when Mohun Bagan defeated Dempo 4–0 at the Tau Devi Lal Stadium.
- Salgaocar have won the cup consecutively the most times (2) in 1998 and 1999.
- Sporting Goa are the only side to have won the Super Cup, without winning the league or Federation Cup.

== Results and winners ==
=== Results ===
Year	Winner	Score	Runner-up	Venue
1997	East Bengal	0–0 (4–2 p)	JCT Mills	Salt Lake Stadium
1998	Salgaocar	1–0	Mohun Bagan	Salt Lake Stadium
1999	Salgaocar	1–0	Mohun Bagan	Ambedkar Stadium
Tournament suspended between 2000 and 2002
2003	Mahindra United	1–1 (4–3 p)	East Bengal	Salt Lake Stadium
2005	Sporting Goa	3–0	Dempo	EMS Stadium
2006	East Bengal	2–1	Mahindra United	Cooperage Ground
2007	Mohun Bagan	4–0	Dempo	Tau Devi Lal Stadium
2008	Dempo	1–0	East Bengal	Tau Devi Lal Stadium
2009	Mohun Bagan	2–1	Dempo	Tau Devi Lal Stadium
2010	Dempo	3–1	East Bengal	Tau Devi Lal Stadium
2011	East Bengal	0–0 (9–8 p)	Salgaocar	Ambedkar Stadium

=== Winners ===
Club	Wins	Last match won	Runners-up
East Bengal	3	2011	3
Dempo	2	2010	3
Mohun Bagan	2	2009	2
Salgaocar	2	1999	1
Mahindra United	1	2003	1
Sporting Goa	1	2005	0
JCT	0	—	1
