= Tolgay Özbey =

Australian soccer player (born 1986)

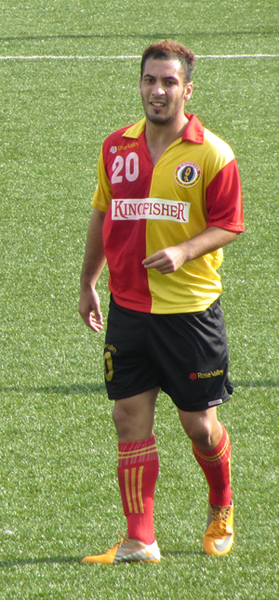
- Özbey with East Bengal in 2011

Personal information
- Date of birth: 12 April 1986 (age 40)
- Place of birth: Sydney, New South Wales, Australia
- Height: 1.77 m (5 ft 9 1/2 in)
- Position: Striker

Senior career*
Years	Team	Apps	(Gls)
2003–2004	Sydney United	3	(0)
2003–2004	Sydney Crescent Star	13	(5)
2004	Fairfield Bulls	3	(4)
2004–2005	Sydney Crescent Star	0	(0)
2005–2006	Sydney FC	1	(0)
2006	Blacktown City Demons	0	(0)
2006–2007	Newcastle United Jets	5	(0)
2007	Blacktown City Demons	10	(4)
2008	Marconi Stallions	18	(7)
2009–2010	Bursa Nilüfer S.A.Ş.	7	(1)
2010	Blacktown City FC	20	(23)
2010–2012	East Bengal	84	(66)
2012–2013	Mohun Bagan	28	(14)
2013	Mohammedan	11	(1)
2014–2015	Dempo	19	(12)
2014	→ FC Goa (loan)	9	(2)
2015	→ Sydney Olympic (loan)	1	(0)
2015–2016	Rockdale City	0	(0)
- * Club domestic league appearances and goals as of 16 September 2015

Tolgay Özbey (born 12 April 1986) is a former Australian professional soccer player, who last played for Rockdale City Suns in the National Premier Leagues NSW as a striker.

== Biography ==
=== Australian Clubs ===
Early in his career, Özbey was recognised for his contributions as a striker with Blacktown City Demons during which he was chosen as the NSW Premier League "Player of the Year" in 2006 and won the competition's top goal scorer award (Andreas Golden Boot Award) back-to-back in 2006 and 2007.

The successful period in 2006 led to his recruitment on loan by A-League side Sydney FC for their 2005–06 season finals campaign. Özbey's first appearance for Sydney came on 12 February 2006, as a substitute in the first leg of the semi-final against Adelaide United at Hindmarsh Stadium. Although Özbey was given a few minutes of game time during the final minutes of the first leg of the semi-final against Adelaide, he remained an unused substitute for the rest of Sydney FC's campaign in which Sydney became eventual champions with their 1–0 victory over the Central Coast Mariners.

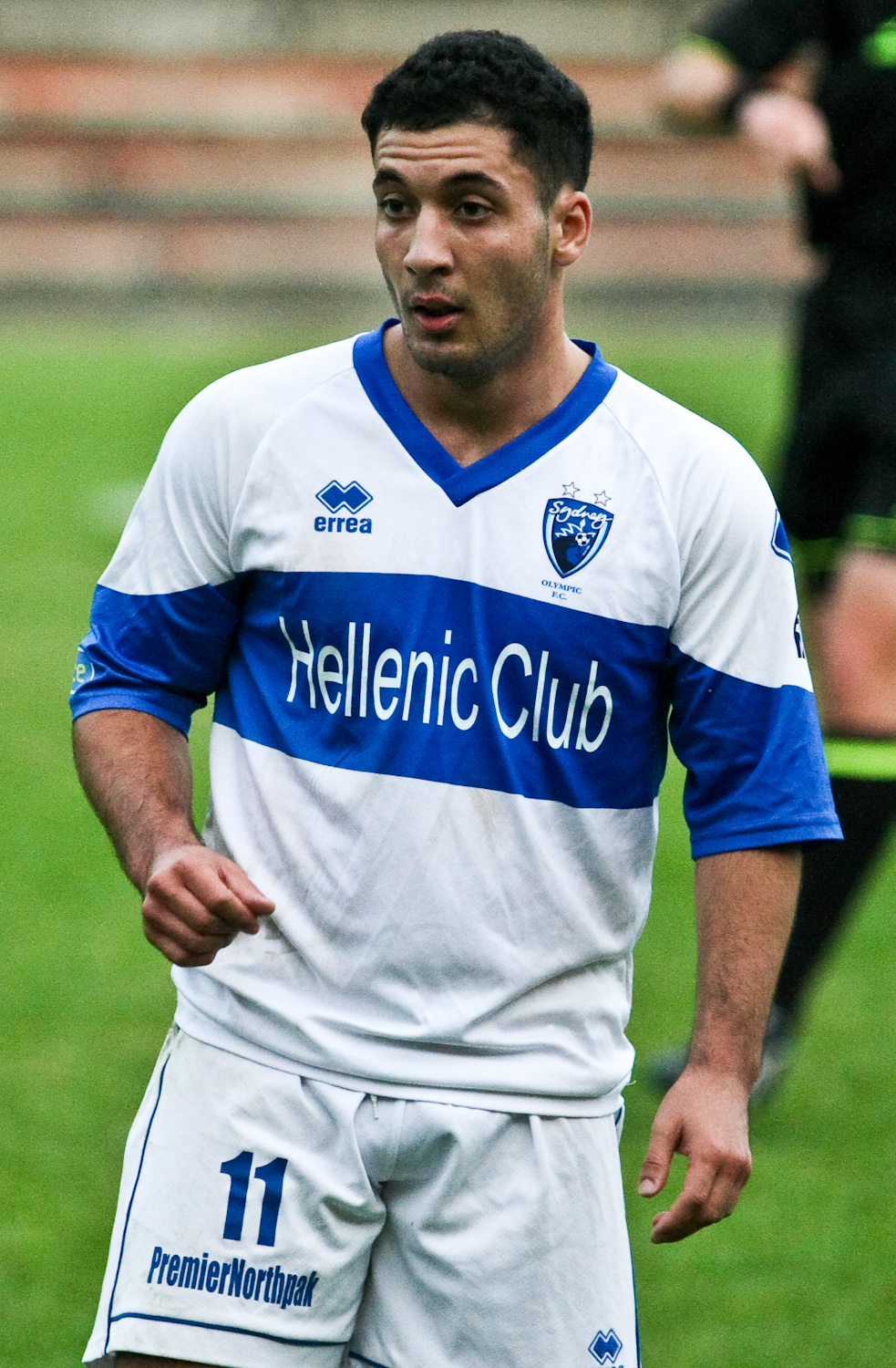
Ozbey in Australia

Özbey's stint at Sydney FC lead to his signing by former mentor Nick Theodorakopoulos who had just taken over charge at A-League side Newcastle Jets for the 2006–07 season. Özbey's time at Newcastle didn't last long after Theodorakopoulos was sacked early on in the season.

Following his attempt at an A-League career, Özbey returned to the NSW Premier League in 2008 with the Marconi Stallions. After a disappointing year with the Stallions, he signed with Sydney Olympic FC for the 2008 season. Özbey had previously played at Sydney Olympic FC during his youth career.

In July 2009, he had trials in Turkey and was signed soon after by Bursa Nilüferspor and participated in the TFF Third League (TFF 3. Lig).

Following the completion of the TFF 3. Lig 2009 season in which Bursa Nilüfer S.A.Ş. finished fourth and missed the opportunity to participate in the TFF 3. Lig Promotion Group, Özbey returned to Australia to again team up with Aytek Genç and many of his old comrades from the successful 2006 and 2007 Blacktown City Demons teams to play for Blacktown City FC in the NSW Premier League 2010 season.

The 2010 NSW Premier League season proved to be fruitful for Özbey at Blacktown as he won a league record, third Golden Boot award with 22 goals from 19 matches bringing his total goals scored wearing the Blacktown guernsey to 76 from 75 matches. Furthermore, Özbey was voted the 2010 NSW Premier League Player of the Year.

=== East Bengal ===
Following the completion of the 2010 NSW Premier League Finals Series, Özbey joined Indian club, East Bengal FC who will be competing in the All India Football Federation (AIFF) I-League as well as the AFC Cup to which East Bengal FC qualified after defeating arch rivals Mohun Bagan AC 1–0 in the 2010 AIFF Federation Cup (India). On 26 April in the 2011 AFC Cup at Barabati Stadium in Cuttack, he gave his side lead by finding the net the 20th minute, and then scored the all-important equaliser in the 93rd minute against South China AA to manage a 3–3 draw. He also scored against Prayag United in East Bengal's 2–1 win, which secured a runner-up finish in the I-League.

=== Mohun Bagan ===
Tolgay Ozbey switched to cross-city rivals Mohun Bagan for the 2012–13 season signing a 2-year deal worth Rs 3.3 crore. The transition was not smooth as the two clubs and the player involved themselves in reciprocal verbal attacks. Early in the season, he picked up an injury in the Federation Cup (India) and was out of action for a few months. He played a big part in Mohun Bagan's survival after being docked off all their points in the I-League. He appeared in 17 I-League matches for the club and scored 10 goals. He scored his first I-League goal for Mohun Bagan against Prayag United on 27 January 2013. He was a frequent scorer in the later half of the season as he scored braces against Sporting Clube de Goa and Pailan Arrows. He also scored goals against United Sikkim, Shillong Lajong, Air India (football club), Mumbai FC, ONGC FC.

Tolgay scored his first derby goal for Mohun Bagan in the last match of the season. The Australian striker had a good run down the right side of the East Bengal defense, before taking a powerful left-footed shot in the last minute of the match in Mohun Bagan's 2–3 loss in the Calcutta Premier Division decider.

However, following some problems with the Mohun Bagan officials, he opted to leave the club.

=== Mohammedan Sporting ===
Ozbey signed for newly promoted Mohammedan on a one-year deal for 2013–14 I-League season, hence joining the elusive list of players who have played for all three Kolkata giants. He started the season in style, scoring a goal in the Durand Cup final on 19 September 2013.

=== Dempo ===
On 12 January 2014, Özbey signed for Goan giant Dempo SC in a one-year deal. He immediately responded to this new signing and scored four (4) goals against the defending champions Churchill Brothers S.C. On 30 May he signed an extension with the club.

=== Return to Australia ===
Mid-way through the 2015 National Premier Leagues NSW season, Ozbey returned to Sydney Olympic, and debuted against Manly United. Whilst injury would go on to hamper the rest of his season, Ozbey returned for Olympic in their 2015 FFA Cup campaign against Gungahlin United and Hume City.

In November 2015, it was announced that Ozbey had joined Rockdale City Suns for the 2016 National Premier Leagues NSW season.

== Personal life ==
Özbey is of Turkish descent and is nicknamed Tolly. Tolgay is a Galatasaray fan and writes regular columns for the Bengali tabloid Ebela.
