= 2010–11 Mohun Bagan FC season =

Indian football club season

Mohun Bagan
2010–11 season
- Chairman: Siddharth Mallya
- Head coach: Stanley Rozario (until 13.12.2010); Sujit Chakraborty (From 24.12.2010)
- Stadium: Salt Lake Stadium; Mohun Bagan Ground
- I-League: 6th
- Calcutta Football League: 3rd
- Federation Cup: Runners Up
- IFA Shield: Runners Up
- Platinum Jubilee Cup: Runners Up
- Top goalscorer: League: Muritala Ali (10 goals); All: Muritala Ali (32 goals)
Home colours	Away colours

The 2010–11 Mohun Bagan Football Club season was the club's 4th season in I-League and 121st season since its establishment in 1889. The team finished runners-up in the Calcutta Football League Federation Cup, Platinum Jubilee Cup, IFA Shield and sixth in the I-League with 34 points in 26 games, winning 8, drawing 10, and losing 8 in the process.

The Kolkata giants, who had a disappointing 2009–10 season that saw three coaches at the helm and the team finishing fifth in I-League, also announced Stanley Rozario as their new head coach for the 2010-11 Season.

On 13 December 2010, less than 24 hours after the green and maroons lost 0–2 to Churchill Brothers in Margao, Stanley Rozario stepped down as the head coach. Next day on 15.12.2010, Mohun Bagan, roped in Subhash Bhowmick as the team's Technical Director and they also announced that Bagan would submit a coach's name who holds an A-licence to the AFC, by 31 December.

Keeping the 31 December deadline for fulfilling Asian Football Confederation's guidelines in mind, Mohun Bagan on Friday 24 December 2010, appointed Sujit Chakraborty as the team coach.

Muritala Ali was their top goalscorer during the season, scoring 32 goals in all competitions. The Nigerian International was signed from Mahindra United.

== Transfers ==
=== In ===
Sl No.	Name	Nat	Position	From
1	Sudipta Banerjee	(India)	GK	Railways FC
2	Kingshuk Debnath	(India)	DF	Chirag United
3	R. Dhanarajan	(India)	DF	Chirag United
4	Nagimuddin Mollick	(India)	DF	Tollygunge Agragami
5	Suman Dutta	(India)	DF	Peerless SC
6	Okwy Diamondstar	(Australia)	DF	Bayswater City SC
7	Jayanta Sen	(India)	MF	Chirag United
8	Gouranga Dutta	(India)	MF	Chirag United
9	Surabuddin Mollick	(India)	MF	Mohammedan AC
10	Santosh Oraon	(India)	MF	Railways FC
11	Satish Kumar Jr	(India)	MF	HAL
12	Jewel Raja	(India)	MF	Dempo SC
13	Muritala Ali	(Nigeria)	FW	Mahindra United
14	Ashim Biswas	(India)	FW	Chirag United
15	Jagtar Singh	(India)	FW	Tata Football Academy
16	Jacken Sebastian		FW	Malabar United FC

=== Out ===
Sl No.	Name
1	Chiradeep Chattopadhyay
2	Mashangva Genius Zenith
3	Subhojit Majumdar
4	Rino Anto
5	Nanjangud Shivananju Manju
6	Deepak Kumar Mondal
7	Joseph Anandavasan
8	Nallappan Mohanraj
9	James Lukram Singh
10	Tomba Singh
11	Micky Fernandes
12	Subho Kumar
13	Kalia Perumal Kulothungan
14	Marcos Alexandro de Carvalho Pereira
15	Santha Kumar
16	Lalramluaha
17	Kartick Kisku
18	Branco Vincent Cardozo
19	Ryuji Sueoka
20	Suraj Mondal

== Squad ==
Note: Flags indicate national team as defined under FIFA eligibility rules; some limited exceptions apply. Players may hold more than one non-FIFA nationality.

No.	Pos.	Nation	Player
—	GK	IND	Sangram Mukherjee
—	GK	IND	Shilton Paul
—	GK	IND	Pralay Banerjee
—	GK	IND	Sudipto Banerjee
—	DF	IND	Habibur Rehman Mondal
—	DF	IND	Sheikh Azim
—	DF	IND	Sangram Mandi
—	DF	IND	Surkumar Singh
—	DF	IND	Karan Atwal
—	DF	IND	Kingshuk Debnath
—	DF	IND	Rahul Kumar
—	DF	IND	Biswajit Saha
—	DF	AUS	Okwy Diamondstar
—	DF	IND	R. Dhanarajan
—	DF	IND	Parminder Singh
—	DF	IND	Nagimuddin Mollick
—	DF	IND	Suman Dutta

No.	Pos.	Nation	Player
—	MF	IND	Snehasish Chakraborty
—	MF	IND	Rakesh Masih
—	MF	IND	Ishfaq Ahmed
—	MF	IND	Manish Mathani
—	MF	IND	Jayanta Sen
—	MF	IND	Souvik Chakraborty
—	MF	IND	Dipendu Dowari
—	MF	IND	Gouranga Dutta
—	MF	IND	Satish Kumar Jr
—	MF	IND	Santosh Oraon
—	MF	IND	Surabuddin Mollick
—	FW	NGA	Chidi Edeh
—	FW	BRA	José Barreto
—	FW	NGA	Muritala Ali
—	FW	IND	Jagtar Singh
—	FW	IND	Ashim Biswas
—	FW	IND	Jacken Sebastian

== Overview ==
=== Overall ===
Competition	First match	Last match	Final position
Calcutta Football League	31 August 2010	29 November 2010	Runners
Federation Cup	22 September 2010	2 October 2010	Runners
Platinum Jubilee Cup	12 November 2010	14 November 2010	Runners
I-League	3 December 2010	29 May 2011	6th
IFA Shield	14 March 2011	31 March 2011	Runners

=== Overview ===
Competition	Record							
Competition	Pld	W	D	L	GF	GA	GD	Win %
Calcutta Football League	16	13	1	2	45	9	+36	81.25
Federation Cup	5	3	1	1	8	3	+5	60.00
Platinum Jubilee Cup	2	1	0	1	4	3	+1	50.00
I-League	26	8	10	8	34	32	+2	30.77
IFA Shield	6	3	2	1	8	5	+3	50.00
Total	55	28	14	13	99	52	+47	50.91

Last updated: 1 June 2011
Source: Competitions

== Kit ==
- Main Sponsor: McDowell's No.1 (Parent Company United Breweries Group is 50% stake holder in the club).
- Kit manufacturer: Reebok

Home Kit	Away Kit

== Platinum Jubilee Cup ==
=== Fixtures & results ===
Win Draw Loss

12 November 2010 Semi Final	Mohun Bagan	1–0	(England) Sheffield FC	Kolkata
15:00 IST	Ashim Biswas 90'	Report	Ashely (penalty missed) 70'	Stadium: Salt Lake Stadium; Man of the Match: Sangram Mukherjee (Mohun Bagan)

14 November 2010 Final	East Bengal	3–3 (a.e.t.) (3–2 p)	Mohun Bagan	Kolkata
15:15 IST	Alvito D'Cunha 45+1'; Robin Singh 76', 101'	Report; MBAC	Satish Kumar Jr 55'; Ashim Biswas 67'; Harpreet Singh 115'	Stadium: Salt Lake Stadium; Referee: Barun Saha; Man of the Match: Robin Singh (East Bengal)
	Penalties
	Sanju Pradhan (penalty scored); Robin Singh (penalty scored); Sushanth Mathew (penalty scored); Ravinder Singh (penalty missed); Biswajit Natta (penalty missed)		(penalty missed) Souvik Chakrabarti; (penalty missed) Snehasish Chakraborty; (penalty scored) Rahul Kumar; (penalty scored) Dipendu Duwary; (penalty missed) Gouranga Dutta

== Calcutta Football League ==
1 September 2010 1	Mohun Bagan	4–0	Tollygunge Agragami	Kolkata
	Muritala Ali 45' (pen.); Barreto 68', 89'; Chidi Edeh 90+3'	Report; MBAC		Stadium: Mohun Bagan Ground; Man of the Match: Barreto (Mohun Bagan)

4 September 2010 2	Mohun Bagan	0-1	Aryan FC	Kolkata
		Report; MBAC	Stanly Okoroigwe 8'	Stadium: Mohun Bagan Ground; Man of the Match: Sourav Chakrabarty (Aryan FC)

8 September 2010 3	Mohun Bagan	4–1	Kalighat MS	Kolkata
	Manish Maithani 54'; Chidi Edeh 68', 86'; Muritala Ali 78'	Report; MBAC	Bapi Das 43'	Stadium: Mohun Bagan Ground; Man of the Match: Manish Maithani (Mohun Bagan)

12 September 2010 4	Mohun Bagan	2-2	Chirag United	Kolkata
	Muritala Ali 6'; Barreto 58'	Report; MBAC	Munna Mullick 8'; Denson Devdas 65'	Stadium: Salt Lake Stadium; Man of the Match: Munna Mullick (Chirag United)

19 October 2010 5	Mohun Bagan	7–0	George Telegraph SC	Kolkata
14:30 IST	Chidi Edeh 1', 6', 45', 71'; Muritala Ali 48', 53', 77' (pen.)	Report; MBAC		Stadium: Mohun Bagan Ground; Man of the Match: Chidi Edeh(Mohun Bagan)

21 October 2010 6	Mohun Bagan	3–0	Railway FC	Kolkata
14:30 IST	Muritala Ali 33'; Chidi Edeh 60', 80'	Report; MBAC		Stadium: Mohun Bagan Ground; Man of the Match: Snehasish Chakraborty(Mohun Bagan)

24 October 2010 7	Mohun Bagan	1–0	Eastern Railway FC	Kolkata
14:30 IST	Abraham 90' (o.g.)	Report		Stadium: Mohun Bagan Ground; Man of the Match: Biswanath Sengupta (Eastern Railway)

27 October 2010 8	Mohun Bagan	3-1	Mohammedan AC	Kolkata
14:30 IST	Muritala Ali 9', 23', 63'	Report; MBAC	Saheed 17'	Stadium: Mohun Bagan Ground; Man of the Match: Muritala Ali (Mohun Bagan)

30 October 2010 9	Mohun Bagan	4–0	Kalighat Club	Kolkata
14:30 IST	Souvik Chakraborty 18'; Barreto 30'; Muritala Ali 44', 70'	Report		Stadium: Mohun Bagan Ground; Man of the Match: Muritala Ali (Mohun Bagan)

1 November 2010 10	Mohun Bagan	3–0	Southern Samity	Kolkata
14:30 IST	Barreto 9', 90+1'; Muritala Ali 90+3'	Report		Stadium: Mohun Bagan Ground; Man of the Match: Barreto (Mohun Bagan)

4 November 2010 11	Mohun Bagan	3-0	Mohammedan SC	Kolkata
15:30 IST	Chidi Edeh 69', 93'; Muritala Ali 84'	Report; MBAC		Stadium: Salt Lake Stadium; Man of the Match: Chidi Edeh (Mohun Bagan)

9 November 2010 12	Mohun Bagan	4–0	West Bengal Police	Kolkata
14:30 IST	Chidi Edeh 21'; Muritala Ali 43' (pen.); Souvik Chakraborty 69'; Snehasish Chakraborty 85'	Report; MBAC		Stadium: Mohun Bagan Ground; Man of the Match: Souvik Chakraborty (Mohun Bagan)

19 November 2010 13	Mohun Bagan	3–0	Calcutta Port Trust	Kolkata
14:30 IST	Barreto 45'; Kingshuk Debnath 74'; Muritala Ali 90'	Report; MBAC		Stadium: Mohun Bagan Ground; Man of the Match: Kingshuk Debnath (Mohun Bagan)

22 November 2010 14	Mohun Bagan	2-1	Peerless SC	Kolkata
14:30 IST	Muritala Ali 90+1', 90+6'	Report; MBAC	Binod Bauri 45'	Stadium: Mohun Bagan Ground; Man of the Match: Debasish Das (Peerless)

26 November 2010 15	East Bengal	2–0	Mohun Bagan	Kolkata
16:30 IST	Robin Singh 12', 59'	Report		Stadium: Salt Lake Stadium; Attendance: 100,000 (est.); Referee: Gamini Nivon Roesh; Man of the Match: Penn Orji (East Bengal)

29 November 2010 16	Mohun Bagan	2-1	BNR	Kolkata
14:30 IST	Jayanta Sen 43'; Barreto 45'	Report	Krisanu Banerjee 90+2'	Stadium: Salt Lake Stadium; Man of the Match: Krisanu Banerjee (BNR)

== Federation Cup ==
Mohun Bagan entered the 2010 Indian Federation Cup automatically as they were already in the I-League. They were placed in Group D along with Mumbai, Salgaocar and Shillong Lajong and their matches were played in Cuttack.The tournament got off to a mix start as well for Bagan as they won against Shillong Lajong 1–0 in their first match with Muritala Ali scoring the winner for Bagan and then drew goalless with Mumbai FC in their second match. In the last game of the group they required a win against Salgaocar to qualify and Bagan thrashed the Goan club by 6–1 with José Ramirez Barreto and Muritala Ali scoring hattricks each. In the semi-finals Mohun Bagan took on Dempo and the game ended 1–1 after 120 minutes. Ranti Martins put Dempo ahead in the 2nd minute while Chidi Edeh scored the equaliser in the 66th minute for Bagan. In the penalty shootout, Sangram Mukherjee saved Ogba Kalu Nnanna's shot as they won 5–3 to reach the finals.

Group D

Team	Pld	W	D	L	GF	GA	GD	Pts
Mohun Bagan AC	3	2	1	0	7	1	+6	7
Salgaocar SC	3	1	1	1	5	8	−3	4
Shillong Lajong FC	3	0	2	1	2	3	−1	2
Mumbai FC	3	0	2	1	0	2	−2	2

=== Matches ===
Win Draw Loss

22 September 2010 Group Stage	Mohun Bagan	1-0	Shillong Lajong	Cuttack
16:00 IST	Muritala Ali 19'; Kingshuk Debnath (red card) 38'	Report		Stadium: Barabati Stadium

24 September 2010 Group Stage	Mohun Bagan	0-0	Mumbai FC	Cuttack
18:45 IST		Report		Stadium: Barabati Stadium

26 September 2010 Group Stage	Mohun Bagan	6-1	Salgaocar	Cuttack
	Barreto 10', 21', 34'; Muritala Ali 24', 39', 88'	Report	Suoeka 85'	Stadium: Barabati Stadium

=== Semi Finals ===
30 September 2010 Semi Final	Mohun Bagan	1-1 (a.e.t.) (5-3 p)	Dempo SC	Cuttack
18:00 IST	Chidi Edeh 66'	Report	Ranti Martins 2'	Stadium: Barabati Stadium
	Penalties
	Barreto (penalty scored); Chidi Edeh (penalty scored); Gouranga Dutta (penalty scored); Snehasish Chakraborty (penalty scored); Muritala Ali (penalty scored)		(penalty scored) Ranti Martins; (penalty scored) Beto; (penalty missed) Kalu; (penalty scored) Godwin Franco

=== Finals ===
2 October 2010 Final	East Bengal	1–0	Mohun Bagan	Cuttack
	Tolgay Ozbey (penalty missed) 21'; Reisangmei Vashum 53'	Report	Muritala Ali (yellow card) 70' (yellow-red card) 88'	Stadium: Barabati Stadium; Referee: Dinesh Nair

== I-League ==
=== League table ===
Pos	Team	Pld	W	D	L	GF	GA	GD	Pts
4	Churchill Brothers	26	14	8	4	57	31	+26	50
5	Pune	26	9	9	8	32	27	+5	36
6	Mohun Bagan	26	8	10	8	34	32	+2	34
7	Mumbai	26	9	7	10	24	28	−4	34
8	Chirag United	26	5	14	7	31	36	−5	29

Source: IndiaFooty.com
Rules for classification: 1) points; 2) goal difference; 3) number of goals scored.

=== Results summary ===
Overall								Home						Away					
Pld	W	D	L	GF	GA	GD	Pts	W	D	L	GF	GA	GD	W	D	L	GF	GA	GD
26	8	10	8	34	32	+2	34	5	5	3	17	11	+6	3	5	5	17	21	−4

Last updated: 1 June 2011.
Source: Flashscore

=== Results by round ===
Round	1	2	3	4	5	6	7	8	9	10	11	12	13	14	15	16	17	18	19	20	21	22	23	24	25	26
Ground	A	H	A	H	A	H	A	H	A	A	H	A	H	H	A	H	H	A	A	A	A	H	H	H	H	A
Result	D	L	L	D	W	W	L	L	W	W	W	D	D	D	D	D	W	L	D	L	D	L	W	D	W	L

Source: Flashscore
A = Away; H = Home; W = Win; D = Draw; L = Loss

=== Fixtures & results ===
Win Draw Loss

3 December 2010 1	Pune	1 – 1	Mohun Bagan	Shree Shiv Chhatrapati Sports Complex (Pune)
19:00 IST	Arata Izumi 82'	Report	Snehasish Chakraborty 30'

8 December 2010 2	Mohun Bagan	1 - 2	HAL	Mohun Bagan Ground
13:45 IST	Barreto 32'	Report	V. Kumar 22'; M. Muralidharan 80'

12 December 2010 3	Churchill Brothers	2 - 0	Mohun Bagan	Jawaharlal Nehru Stadium Goa (Margao)
15:45 IST	Odafa 4', 67'	Report; News 18

16 December 2010 4	Mohun Bagan	2 - 2	Dempo	Mohun Bagan Ground
16:00 IST	Muritala Ali 9'; Barreto 80'	Report; Rediff	Cliffton Gonsalves 37'; Ranty Martins 79'

23 December 2010 5	JCT	0–1	Mohun Bagan	Ludhiana
		Report	Manish Maithani 67'	Stadium: Guru Nanak Stadium

30 December 2010 6	Mohun Bagan	2-0	Mumbai FC	Mohun Bagan Ground
13:45 IST	Muritala Ali 45'; Ashim Biswas 78'	Report

4 January 2011 7	Viva Kerala	2–0	Mohun Bagan	Kannur
16:00 IST	T. Karmakar 11'; Anil Kumar 73'	Report; TOI		Stadium: Municipal Jawahar Stadium

9 January 2011 8	Mohun Bagan	0–1	Chirag United	Kolkata
14:00 IST		Report	Josimar 81'	Stadium: Mohun Bagan Ground

15 January 2011 9	Salgaocar	1 - 3	Mohun Bagan	Jawaharlal Nehru Stadium Goa (Margao)
15:45 IST	Ryuiji Sueoka 87'	Report; TOI	Ishfaq Ahmed 13'; Chidi Edeh 18', 24'

18 January 2011 10	ONGC	1 – 3	Mohun Bagan	The Cooperage Ground
15:30 IST	ND Opara 44'	Report; TOI	Ishfaq Ahmed 32'; Chidi Edeh 35', 90'

23 January 2011 11	Mohun Bagan	2 - 0	Pailan Arrows	Mohun Bagan Ground
14:00 IST	Chidi Edeh 11', 82'	Report

29 January 2011 12	Air India	1 – 1	Mohun Bagan	Shree Shiv Chhatrapati Sports Complex (Pune)
15:30 IST	Manjit Singh 45'	Report; Rediff	Barreto 59'

6 February 2011 13	Mohun Bagan	1–1	East Bengal	Kolkata
	Jose Ramirez Barreto 29'	Report	Sanju Pradhan 8' (pen.)	Stadium: Salt Lake Stadium

12 February 2011 14	Mohun Bagan	0–0	Pune FC	Kolkata
13:45 IST		Report		Stadium: Salt Lake Stadium

20 February 2011 15	HAL	1 - 1	Mohun Bagan	Bengaluru
15:45 IST	M. Muralidharan 39'	Report	Surkumar Singh 31'	Stadium: Sree Kanteerava Stadium

26 February 2011 16	Mohun Bagan	0–0	Churchill Brothers	Kolkata
13:45 IST		Report		Stadium: Salt Lake Stadium

5 March 2011 17	Mohun Bagan	2-1	Viva Kerala	Kolkata
13:45 IST	Muritala Ali 9'; Barreto 35'	Report	CS.Sabeeth 85'	Stadium: Salt Lake Stadium

10 March 2011 18	Dempo	4 - 1	Mohun Bagan	Jawaharlal Nehru Stadium Goa (Margao)
16:00 IST	Lawrence Climax 26'; Clifford Miranda 29', 74'; Ranty Martins 46'	Report; Telegraph	Muritala Ali 87'

3 April 2011 19	Mumbai	0-0	Mohun Bagan	Kolhapur
16:00 IST		Report		Stadium: Rajarshi Shahu Stadium

9 April 2011 20	East Bengal	2–1	Mohun Bagan	Kolkata
17:00 IST	Tolgay Ozbey 5'; Baljit Sahni 54'	Report	Surkumar Singh 48'	Stadium: Salt Lake Stadium

16 April 2011 21	Chirag United	1-1	Mohun Bagan	Kolkata
17:00 IST	Sunil Chhetri 31'	Report	Muritala Ali 80'	Stadium: Salt Lake Stadium

24 April 2011 22	Mohun Bagan	1 – 2	ONGC	Kolkata
17:00 IST	Surkumar Singh 3'	Report	Kailash Patil 78', 83'	Stadium: Mohun Bagan Ground

1 May 2011 23	Mohun Bagan	2 – 0	Air India	Kolkata
17:00 IST	Muritala Ali 65', 82'	Report		Stadium: Mohun Bagan Ground

8 May 2011 24	Mohun Bagan	2 - 2	Salgaocar	Kolkata
17:00 IST	Chidi Edeh 14', 52'	Report	Ryuiji Sueoka 29'; Oliveira G. 38'	Stadium: Mohun Bagan Ground

22 May 2011 25	Mohun Bagan	2 - 0	JCT	Kolkata
	Satish Kumar Jr 60'; Ashim Biswas 69'	Report		Stadium: Mohun Bagan Ground

29 May 2011 26	Pailan Arrows	5 - 4	Mohun Bagan	Dr. Ambedkar Stadium
16:30 IST	Jeje Lalpekhlua 9', 25', 87'; Shilton D'Silva 18', 21'	Report	Chidi Edeh 42'; Muritala Ali 57', 78', 90+2'

== IFA Shield ==
=== Group Stage ===
2011 IFA Shield Group B
Team	Pld	W	D	L	GF	GA	GD	Pts
Mohun Bagan	4	2	2	0	5	2	+3	8
Shillong Lajong FC	4	2	2	0	6	4	+2	8
Pune FC	4	2	0	2	3	4	−1	6
Chirag United	4	1	1	2	5	4	+1	4
Aryan Club	4	0	1	3	1	6	−5	1

=== Matches ===
Win Draw Loss

14 March 2011 Group Stage	Mohun Bagan	1-1	Shillong Lajong	Kolkata
15:00 IST	Ashim Biswas 32'	Report	Zenith 66'	Stadium: Salt Lake Stadium; Man of the Match: Zenith (Shillong Lajong)

17 March 2011 Group Stage	Mohun Bagan	1-0	Aryan FC	Kolkata
17:00 IST	Ashim Biswas 38'	Report		Stadium: Salt Lake Stadium; Man of the Match: Ashim Biswas (Mohun Bagan)

21 March 2011 Group Stage	Mohun Bagan	2-0	Pune FC	Kolkata
17:00 IST	Chidi Edeh 16', 44'	Report		Stadium: Salt Lake Stadium; Man of the Match: Chidi Edeh (Mohun Bagan)

24 March 2011 Group Stage	Mohun Bagan	1-1	Chirag United	Kolkata
15:00 IST	Narugopal 9' (o.g.)	Report	Choi 61' (pen.)	Stadium: Salt Lake Stadium; Man of the Match: Choi (Chirag United)

=== Semi Finals ===
28 March 2011 Semi Final	Mohun Bagan	2-1	Southern Samity	Kolkata
IST	Chidi Edeh 43'; Ashim Biswas 80'	Report	Edmilson 8'	Stadium: Salt Lake Stadium; Man of the Match: Ashim Biswas (Mohun Bagan)

=== Finals ===
31 March 2011 Final	Mohun Bagan	1-2	Churchill Brothers	Kolkata
IST	Chidi Edeh 37'	Report	Odafa Onyeka Okolie 49'; Charan Rai 65'	Stadium: Salt Lake Stadium; Man of the Match: Charan Rai (Churchill Brothers)

== Player Statistics ==
Sl No.	Name	Nat	CFL	Federation Cup	Jublee Cup	I-League	IFA Shield	Total
1	Muritala Ali	(Nigeria)	18	4	0	10	0	32
2	Chidi Edeh	(Nigeria)	12	1	0	9	4	26
3	Barreto	(Brazil)	8	3	0	5	0	16
4	Ashim Biswas	(India)	0	0	2	2	3	7
5	Surkumar Singh	(India)	0	0	0	3	0	3
6	Satish Kumar Jr	(India)	0	0	1	1	0	2
6	Ishfaq Ahmed	(India)	0	0	0	2	0	2
6	Souvik Chakraborty	(India)	2	0	0	0	0	2
6	Manish Maithani	(India)	1	0	0	1	0	2
6	Snehasish Chakraborty	(India)	1	0	0	1	0	2
7	Kingshuk Debnath	(India)	1	0	0	0	0	1
7	Jayanta Sen	(India)	1	0	0	0	0	1
7	Harpreet Singh	(India)	0	0	1	0	0	1
Own Goal(s)			1	0	0	0	1	2
Total			45	8	4	34	8	99

== See also ==
- Mohun Bagan Super Giant
- 2009-10 Mohun Bagan FC season
- 2011–12 Mohun Bagan season
- 2012–13 Mohun Bagan FC season
