= 2010 Indian Federation Cup final =

- Event: 2010 Indian Federation Cup
East Bengal	Mohun Bagan
1	0
- Date: 2 October 2010
- Venue: Barabati Stadium, Cuttack, Odisha
- Man of the Match: Reisangmei Vashum
- Referee: Dinesh Nair

The 2010 Indian Federation Cup final was the 32nd final of the Indian Federation Cup, the top knock-out competition in India, and was contested between arch-rivals East Bengal and Mohun Bagan on 2 October 2010.

East Bengal won the final 1–0, to successfully retain and claim their seventh Federation Cup title. Reisangmei Vashum scored the solitary goal for the Red and Gold brigade in the 53rd minute from Robin Singh's lay-off pass.

== Route to the final ==
=== East Bengal ===
Round	Date	Opposition	Score
GS	21 September 2010	Air India	3–1
GS	23 September 2010	HAL	2–1
GS	25 September 2010	Pune FC	1–0
Semi-final	29 September 2010	Churchill Brothers	1–0

East Bengal entered the 2010 Indian Federation Cup automatically as they were already in the I-League. They were placed in Group A along with Air India, HAL, and Pune FC and their matches were played in Cuttack. The tournament got off to a great start for East Bengal as they defeated Air India in their opening match by 3–1 with Tolgay Ozbey scoring a brace and Robin Singh scoring the third. Bijith Setty scored a consolation goal in the 89th minute for Air India. In the second match, East Bengal came from behind to defeat HAL by 2–1 with Penn Orji and Tolgay Ozbey finding the back of the net in the 13th and 33rd minute respectively after Hamza put HAL ahead in the 9th minute. In the last game of the group stages, East Bengal pipped Pune FC by 1–0 with Penn Orji finding the back of the net once again in the 67th minute as the Red and Gold brigade confirmed the top spot in the group with 3 wins and progressed to the Semi-finals where they would face Churchill Brothers. Tolgay Ozbey's 11th-minute strike was enough for Trevor Morgan's men to reach the final.

=== Mohun Bagan ===
Round	Date	Opposition	Score
GS	22 September 2010	Shillong Lajong	1–0
GS	24 September 2010	Mumbai FC	0–0
GS	26 September 2010	Salgaocar	6–1
Semi-final	30 September 2010	Dempo	1–1 (5–3 pen)

Mohun Bagan entered the 2010 Indian Federation Cup automatically as they were already in the I-League. They were placed in Group D along with Mumbai, Salgaocar and Shillong Lajong and their matches were played in Cuttack.The tournament got off to a mix start as well for Bagan as they won against Shillong Lajong 1–0 in their first match with Muritala Ali scoring the winner for Bagan and then drew goalless with Mumbai FC in their second match. In the last game of the group they required a win against Salgaocar to qualify and Bagan thrashed the Goan club by 6–1 with José Ramirez Barreto and Muritala Ali scoring hattricks each. In the semi-finals Mohun Bagan took on Dempo and the game ended 1–1 after 120 minutes. Ranti Martins put Dempo ahead in the 2nd minute while Chidi Edeh scored the equaliser in the 66th minute for Bagan. In the penalty shootout, Sangram Mukherjee saved Ogba Kalu Nnanna's shot as they won 5–3 to reach the finals.

== Match ==
=== Details ===
2 October 2010^{(KD)}
18:30 IST

East Bengal	1 – 0	Mohun Bagan
Reisangmei Vashum 53'	Report	Muritala Ali (yellow card) 70' (yellow-red card) 88'

Barabati Stadium, Cuttack
Attendance: 10,000 (est.)
Referee: Dinesh Nair

East Bengal	Mohun Bagan

GK	24	(India) Sandip Nandy
LB	29	(India) Saumik Dey (c)
CB	3	(India) Nirmal Chettri
CB	4	(Nigeria) Uga Okpara
RB	8	(India) Naoba Singh
RM	7	(India) Harmanjot Khabra	(substituted off) 88'
CM	14	(India) Mehtab Hossain
CM	18	(Nigeria) Penn Orji
LM	12	(India) Reisangmei Vashum	(substituted off) 79'
ST	23	(India) Robin Singh	(substituted off) 80'
ST	20	(Australia) Tolgay Ozbey	(substituted off) 77'
Substitutes:
DF	2	(India) Ravinder Singh	(substituted on) 88'
MF	17	(India) Sushanth Mathew	(substituted on) 80'
FW	10	(Nigeria) Ekene Ikenwa	(substituted on) 77'
Manager:
(England) Trevor Morgan

GK	31	(India) Shilton Paul
RB	2	(India) S.K. Azim
CB	4	(India) Kingshuk Debnath
CB	34	(India) Sagram Mandi
LB	6	(India) R Dhanarajan
DM	16	(Australia) Okwy Diamondstar	(substituted off) 60'
CM	14	(India) Manish Maithani (c)
MF	8	(India) Snehasish Chakraborty
ST	12	(India) Ashim Biswas	(substituted off) 74'
ST	10	(Brazil) José Ramirez Barreto
ST	11	(Nigeria) Muritala Ali	(yellow card) 70' (yellow-red card) 88'
Substitutes:
MF	7	(India) Jayanta Sen		(substituted on) 70'
FW	9	(Nigeria) Chidi Edeh		(substituted on) 60'
Manager:
(India) Stanley Rozario
