= List of Indian football transfers 2010–11 =

List of Indian transfers for 2010-11 season.

== AIFF XI ==
In: Note: Flags indicate national team as defined under FIFA eligibility rules; some limited exceptions apply. Players may hold more than one non-FIFA nationality.

No.	Pos.	Nation	Player
—	GK	IND	Ravi Kumar (Transferred from TFA)
—	DF	IND	Vishal Kumar Ravindrakumar (Transferred from HAL SC)
—	DF	IND	Shouvik Ghosh (Transferred from Chirag United)
—	MF	IND	Aksay Vimal Kumar (Transferred from Gujarat F.A)
—	FW	IND	Milan Singh (Transferred from Churchill Brothers SC)
—	MF	IND	Lalrindika Ralte (Transferred from Churchill Brothers SC)
—	FW	IND	Jagtar Singh (Transferred from Mohun Bagan)
—	FW	IND	Malsawmfela (Transferred from Salgaocar SC)
—	DF	IND	Inderpreet Singh (Transferred from Salgaocar SC)
—	DF	IND	Shilton D'Silva (Transferred from Mahindra United)
—	DF	IND	Pramathesh (Transferred from Dempo SC)
—	MF	IND	Vikramjit Singh (Transferred from Chandigarh F.A)
—	MF	IND	Tirthankar Sarkar (Transferred from Salgaocar SC)

Out: Note: Flags indicate national team as defined under FIFA eligibility rules; some limited exceptions apply. Players may hold more than one non-FIFA nationality.

No.	Pos.	Nation	Player

== Air India FC ==
In: Note: Flags indicate national team as defined under FIFA eligibility rules; some limited exceptions apply. Players may hold more than one non-FIFA nationality.

No.	Pos.	Nation	Player
—	FW	IND	Manjit Singh (Transferred from Salgaocar SC)
—		IND	Chanchal Saha (Transferred from Vasco SC)
—		IND	Bijay Bospore (Transferred from Railway FC)
—	DF	IND	Dhanachandra Singh (Transferred from Churchill Brothers SC)
—	GK	IND	Arup Debnath (Transferred from East Bengal FC)
—	DF	IND	Amrit Pal Singh (Transferred from Mohammedan SC)
—	MF	IND	Babin Biswas (Transferred from Mohammedan SC)
—	MF	IND	Jothi Kumar (Transferred from Mohammedan SC)
—		IND	Shekh Nadeem (Transferred from Betul Academy)
—	MF	IND	Dharamjit Singh (Transferred from East Bengal FC)
—		IND	Avijit Ghosh (Transferred from East Bengal FC)
—	FW	NGA	Nnabuike Praise (Transferred from Raghav SC)
—	DF	BRA	Eduardo (Transferred from Chirag United)

Out: Note: Flags indicate national team as defined under FIFA eligibility rules; some limited exceptions apply. Players may hold more than one non-FIFA nationality.

No.	Pos.	Nation	Player
—	DF	IND	Ravinder Singh (Transferred to East Bengal FC)
—	GK	IND	Arnab Das Sharma (Transferred to Salgaocar)
—	DF	IND	Irungbam Khelemba Singh (Transferred to Salgaocar)
—	DF	IND	Syed Farid (Transferred to Salgaocar)
—		IND	Aamir Shaik (Transferred to BEML)
—	DF	IND	Harpreet Singh (Transferred to Mohun Bagan AC)
—	GK	IND	Shambhu Mistry (Transferred to Khalighat FC)
—	GK	NGA	Abiodun Martins (Transferred to George Telegraph FC)
—	MF	IND	James Sargolsem Singh (Transferred to HAL SC)

== Chirag United ==
In: Note: Flags indicate national team as defined under FIFA eligibility rules; some limited exceptions apply. Players may hold more than one non-FIFA nationality.

No.	Pos.	Nation	Player
—	DF	IND	Justin Stephen (Transferred from Mahindra United)
—	MF	IND	Nacimento Silveira (Transferred from Churchill Brothers SC)
—	MF	IND	Jerry Zirsanga (Transferred from Dempo SC)
—	DF	NGA	Chika Wali (Transferred from Pune FC)
—	DF	IND	Melwyn Rodrigues (Transferred from Salgaocar SC)
—	DF	UZB	Sergey Tokov (Transferred from Pune FC)
—	FW	NGA	Junior Obagbemiro (Transferred from Sporting Clube deGoa)
—	GK	IND	Abhijit Mondal (Transferred from Dempo)
—		IND	Asif.K (Transferred from Malabar United)
—	DF	IND	Noushad.K (Transferred from Viva Kerala)
—	MF	IND	Sirajudeen (Transferred from Viva Kerala)

Out: Note: Flags indicate national team as defined under FIFA eligibility rules; some limited exceptions apply. Players may hold more than one non-FIFA nationality.

No.	Pos.	Nation	Player
—	FW	IND	Parveen Kumar (Transferred to JCT FC)
—	DF	IND	Rahul K (Transferred to JCT FC)
—	MF	IND	Bengkok Nameirakpam (Transferred to HAL SC)
—	DF	BRA	Eduardo (Transferred to Air India FC)

== Churchill Brothers ==
In: Note: Flags indicate national team as defined under FIFA eligibility rules; some limited exceptions apply. Players may hold more than one non-FIFA nationality.

No.	Pos.	Nation	Player
—	DF	IND	Denzil Franco (Transferred from Mahindra United)
—	FW	IND	M.Mohammed Rafi (Transferred from Mahindra United)
—		IND	Jayanta Rajbhansi (Transferred from Aryans Club)
—	DF	IND	Dharmaraj Ravanan (Transferred from Mahindra United)
—	MF	IND	Steven Dias (Transferred from Mahindra United)
—		IND	Sunil Barla (Transferred from JCB Bhillai)
—	MF	IND	M.P. Sakeer (Transferred from Viva Kerala)
—		IND	Amit Rajbhansi (Transferred from Calcutta Customs)
—	MF	IND	Noel Fernandes (Transferred from Mahindra United)
—	DF	IND	Rauf Khan (Transferred from Mahindra United)
—		IND	Hardeep Singh (Transferred from IFA Jamshedpur)
—	MF	IND	Chitrasen Singh Chinta (Salgaocar)
—	DF	IRN	Siavash Saminia (Salgaocar)
—	FW	NGA	Koko Sakibo (Vasco)

Out: Note: Flags indicate national team as defined under FIFA eligibility rules; some limited exceptions apply. Players may hold more than one non-FIFA nationality.

No.	Pos.	Nation	Player
—	MF	IND	Reisangmei Vashum (Transferred to East Bengal FC)
—	DF	IND	Noaba Singh (Transferred to East Bengal FC)
—	GK	IND	Nacimento Silveira (Transferred to Chirag United)
—	DF	IND	Dhanachandra Singh (Transferred to Air India FC)
—	FW	IND	Saran Singh (Transferred to JCT FC)
—	DF	IND	Shekar Muralidharan (Transferred to HAL SC)

== Dempo SC ==
In: Note: Flags indicate national team as defined under FIFA eligibility rules; some limited exceptions apply. Players may hold more than one non-FIFA nationality.

No.	Pos.	Nation	Player
—	GK	IND	Subhasish Roy Chowdhury (Transferred from Mahindra United)
—	MF	IND	Godwin Franco (Transferred from Pune FC)
—	MF	IND	Micky Fernandes (Transferred from Mohun Bagan)
—	DF	IND	Debabrata Roy (Transferred from Mahindra United)

Out: Note: Flags indicate national team as defined under FIFA eligibility rules; some limited exceptions apply. Players may hold more than one non-FIFA nationality.

No.	Pos.	Nation	Player
—	GK	IND	Abhijit Mondal (Transferred to Chirag United)
—	MF	IND	Jerry Zirsanga (Transferred to Chirag United)
—	MF	IND	Velito Cruz (Transferred to Pune FC)

== East Bengal ==
In: Note: Flags indicate national team as defined under FIFA eligibility rules; some limited exceptions apply. Players may hold more than one non-FIFA nationality.

No.	Pos.	Nation	Player
—	FW	NGA	Ekene Ikenwa (Transferred from Salgaocar SC)
—	DF	IND	Gurwinder Singh (Transferred from JCT FC)
—	MF	NGA	Penn Orji (Transferred from JCT FC)
—	DF	IND	Ravinder Singh (Transferred from Air India FC)
—	MF	IND	Reisangmei Vashum (Transferred from Churchill Brothers SC)
—	MF	IND	Noaba Singh (Transferred from Churchill Brothers SC)
—	MF	IND	Baljit Sahni (Transferred from JCT FC)
—	FW	IND	Sushil Kumar Singh (Transferred from Mahindra United)
—	MF	IND	Aseem Kutty (Transferred from Mahindra United)
—	DF	IND	Sunil Kumar Thakur (Transferred from JCT FC)
—	FW	IND	Robin Singh (Transferred from TFA)
—	MF	IND	Sushanth Mathew (Transferred from Mahindra United)
—	FW	AUS	Tolgay Özbey (Transferred from Blacktown City FC)

Out: Note: Flags indicate national team as defined under FIFA eligibility rules; some limited exceptions apply. Players may hold more than one non-FIFA nationality.

No.	Pos.	Nation	Player
—	GK	IND	Arup Debnath (Transferred to Air India FC)
—	FW	GHA	Yusif Yakubu (Transferred to Salgaocar SC)
—	FW	IND	Singam Subhash Singh (Transferred to Salgaocar SC)
—	FW	IND	Malswamkima (Transferred to Mumbai FC)
—	MF	IND	Dharamjit Singh (Transferred to Air India FC)
—	MF	IND	Wasim Feroze (Transferred to J&K Bank)
—		IND	Gobin Adhikari (Transferred to Faria SM)
—		IND	Krishna Das (Transferred to Faria SM)
—		IND	Avijit Ghosh (Transferred to Air India FC)
—	DF	IND	Poibang Poshana (Transferred to Ar-Hima)
—	FW	NGA	Ekene Ikenwa (Loaned to Salgaocar SC)

== HAL ==
In: Note: Flags indicate national team as defined under FIFA eligibility rules; some limited exceptions apply. Players may hold more than one non-FIFA nationality.

No.	Pos.	Nation	Player
—	DF	NEP	Rohit Chand (Free Transfer)
—	MF	IND	James Sargolsem Singh (Transferred from Air India FC)
—		IND	Goutam Debnath (Transferred from Vasco SC)
—		IND	Vijesh Kumar (Transferred from Salgaocar SC)
—		IND	Sanath Kumar (Transferred from Salgaocar SC)
—	DF	IND	Shekar Muralidharan (Transferred from Churchill Brothers SC)
—		IND	Samuel Dhinakarat (Transferred from Indian Nationals FC)
—		IND	Arun.S (Transferred from Viva Kerala)
—		IND	Pramod.P (Transferred from Malabar United F.C.)
—		IND	Shshas.K (Transferred from Subash SC)
—		IND	Liliyan Kennath (Transferred from Akbar Travels)
—		IND	P.Karthik (Transferred from ICF Chennai)
—	MF	IND	Bengkok Nameirakpam (Transferred from Chirag United)

Out: Note: Flags indicate national team as defined under FIFA eligibility rules; some limited exceptions apply. Players may hold more than one non-FIFA nationality.

No.	Pos.	Nation	Player
—	FW	IND	Satish Kumar Jr (Transferred to Mohun Bagan AC)
—		IND	Bimal Minz (Transferred to ONGC FC)
—		IND	Jotin Singh (Transferred to ONGC FC)
—		IND	Ricky Joy (Transferred to ONGC FC)
—		IND	R.Ravi Babu (Transferred to Saroj Sangha)
—		NGA	Okwagbe Fredarick (Transferred to Vasco SC)
—	FW	NGA	Ayuba Mbwas Mangut (Transferred to Viva Kerala)
—		IND	Amar Deb (Transferred to Mohun Bagan AC)

== JCT ==
In: Note: Flags indicate national team as defined under FIFA eligibility rules; some limited exceptions apply. Players may hold more than one non-FIFA nationality.

No.	Pos.	Nation	Player
—	FW	NGA	Keke Ibrahim (Transferred from Vasco SC)
—	DF	NGA	Daniel Bedemi (Transferred from Shillong Lajong FC)
—	FW	IND	Parveen Kumar (Transferred from Chirag United)
—	DF	IND	Amarwant Singh (Transferred from Viva Kerala)
—	DF	IND	Rahul.K (Transferred from Chirag United)
—	FW	IND	Saran Singh (Transferred from Churchill Brothers SC)

Out: Note: Flags indicate national team as defined under FIFA eligibility rules; some limited exceptions apply. Players may hold more than one non-FIFA nationality.

No.	Pos.	Nation	Player
—	DF	IND	Gurwinder Singh (Transferred to East Bengal FC)
—	MF	NGA	Penn Orji (Transferred to East Bengal FC)
—	MF	IND	Baljit Sahni (Transferred to East Bengal FC)
—	GK	NGA	Chukwukere Ndudiri (Transferred to Langsning SC)
—	DF	IND	Sunil Kumar Thakur (Transferred to East Bengal FC)
—	MF	IND	Baldeep Singh Junior (Transferred to Salgaocar)
—	GK	IND	Karanjit Singh (Transferred to Salgaocar)
—	FW	NGA	Emmamuel Okoro (Transferred to Eastern Railway SC)
—	DF	IND	Jaspal Singh (Transferred to Salgaocar)
—	DF	IND	P.C.Lalhimthara (Transferred to Shillong Lajong FC)

== Mohun Bagan ==
In: Note: Flags indicate national team as defined under FIFA eligibility rules; some limited exceptions apply. Players may hold more than one non-FIFA nationality.

No.	Pos.	Nation	Player
—	DF	IND	Rahul Kumar (Transferred from Pune FC)
—	FW	IND	Jacken Sebastien (Transferred from Malabar United)
—	FW	NGA	Muritala Ali (Transferred from Mahindra United)
—	DF	IND	Harpreet Singh (Transferred from Air India FC)
—	MF	IND	Jewel Raja shaikh (Transferred from ONGC FC)
—		IND	Amar Deb (Transferred from HAL SC)

Out: Note: Flags indicate national team as defined under FIFA eligibility rules; some limited exceptions apply. Players may hold more than one non-FIFA nationality.

No.	Pos.	Nation	Player
—	DF	IND	Genius Zenith (Transferred to Shillong Lajong FC)
—	MF	IND	Lalramluaha (Transferred to Shillong Lajong FC)
—	MF	JPN	Ryuji Sueoka (Transferred to Salgaocar)
—	MF	IND	Mickey Fernandes (Transferred to Dempo SC)
—	DF	IND	Rino Anto (Transferred to Salgaocar)
—	MF	IND	Kaila Kulothungan (Transferred to Viva Kerala)

== Mumbai FC ==
In: Note: Flags indicate national team as defined under FIFA eligibility rules; some limited exceptions apply. Players may hold more than one non-FIFA nationality.

No.	Pos.	Nation	Player
—	DF	IND	Bungo Singh (Transferred from Salgaocar SC)
—	FW	IND	Malswamkima (Transferred from East Bengal FC)
—	DF	IND	Nicholas Rodrigues (Transferred from SC Goa)
—		IND	V.Prem Kumar (Transferred from Mohammedan SC)
—	FW	NGA	Ezeh Henry (Transferred from Calcutta Port Trust)

Out: Note: Flags indicate national team as defined under FIFA eligibility rules; some limited exceptions apply. Players may hold more than one non-FIFA nationality.

No.	Pos.	Nation	Player
—	DF	IND	Gurpreet Singh (Transferred to Secrsa Bilaspur)
—	GK	IND	Amit Singha Roy (Transferred to Southern Samity)
—	MF	IND	Surojit Roy (Transferred to Aryan Club)
—	MF	NGA	Bashiru Abbas (Transferred to Ageya Chalo Sangha)
—	MF	IND	Jagdish Kumar.P (Transferred to Bangalore Independence FC)

== ONGC ==
In: Note: Flags indicate national team as defined under FIFA eligibility rules; some limited exceptions apply. Players may hold more than one non-FIFA nationality.

No.	Pos.	Nation	Player
—		IND	Bimal Minz (Transferred from HAL SC)
—		IND	Jotin Singh (Transferred from HAL SC)
—		IND	Ricky Roy (Transferred from HAL SC)
—		IND	Bidyut Halder (Transferred from Customs SC)

Out: Note: Flags indicate national team as defined under FIFA eligibility rules; some limited exceptions apply. Players may hold more than one non-FIFA nationality.

No.	Pos.	Nation	Player
—	MF	IND	Jewel Raja shaikh (Transferred to Mohun Bagan AC)
—	MF	IND	Malsawmdawngliana (Transferred to Ar-Hima FC)
—	FW	NGA	Nwoke Chinedu (Transferred to Calcutta Port Trust)
—		IND	Chand Hembram (Transferred to Aryan Club)
—		IND	Jonathan Lalsangzuala (Transferred to Peerless SC)

== Pune FC ==
In: Note: Flags indicate national team as defined under FIFA eligibility rules; some limited exceptions apply. Players may hold more than one non-FIFA nationality.

No.	Pos.	Nation	Player
—		IND	Amit Kumar Nandi (Transferred from Salgaocar SC)
—	DF	IND	Gurjinder Kumar (Transferred from TFA)
—	MF	IND	Krishnan Ajayan Nair (Transferred from Mahindra United)
—	DF	SEN	Lamine Tamba (Transferred from Mahindra United)
—	DF	IND	Kamaljeet Kumar (Transferred from Mumbai FC)
—	MF	IND	Paresh Shivalkar (Transferred from Mahindra United)
—		IND	Raj Singh (Transferred from SAI Gujarat)
—		IND	Themreishang.A.S (Transferred from Southern SC)
—	DF	IND	Lester Fernandez (Transferred from Salgaocar SC)
—		IND	Thckchom Roshan Singh (Transferred from Simla Youngs FC)
—		IND	Shivaram.R (Transferred from Southern Blues)
—		IND	Velito Cruz (Transferred from Dempo SC)
—	FW	GUI	Mandjou Keita (Transferred from Salgaocar SC)
—		IND	Kamardeep Singh (Transferred from Dalbir FA)
—		IND	Britto PM (Transferred from Viva Kerala)

Out: Note: Flags indicate national team as defined under FIFA eligibility rules; some limited exceptions apply. Players may hold more than one non-FIFA nationality.

No.	Pos.	Nation	Player
—	MF	IND	Godwin Franco (Transferred to Dempo SC)
—	DF	IND	Rahul Kumar (Transferred to Mohun Bagan AC)
—		IND	Mahesh Sarkar (Transferred to Southern Samity)
—	DF	IND	Gurjinder Singh (Transferred to Peerless FC)
—	DF	IND	Rauf Khan (Transferred to Churchill Brothers SC)
—	DF	NGA	Chika Wali (Transferred to Chirag United)
—	DF	UZB	Sergey Tokov (Transferred to Chirag United)
—	MF	IND	Anees Kutty (Transferred to KSEB)
—		IND	Johny Khamrang (Transferred to Ukhrul FC)

== Salgaocar ==
In: Note: Flags indicate national team as defined under FIFA eligibility rules; some limited exceptions apply. Players may hold more than one non-FIFA nationality.

No.	Pos.	Nation	Player
—	DF	IND	N. Kali Alaudeen (Transferred from Mahindra United)
—	FW	IND	Khangemban Thoi Singh (Transferred from Mahindra United)
—	MF	IND	Sukhwinder Singh (Transferred from Mahindra United)
—	GK	IND	Monotosh Ghosh (Transferred from Mahindra United)
—	MF	JPN	Ryuji Sueoka (Transferred from Mohun Bagan)
—	DF	IND	Irungbam Khelemba Singh (Transferred from Air India FC)
—	GK	IND	Arnab Das Sharma (Transferred from Air India FC)
—	DF	IND	Syed Farid (Transferred from Air India FC)
—	DF	IND	Rino Anto (Transferred from Mohun Bagan)
—	GK	IND	Karanjit Singh (Transferred from JCT FC)
—	DF	IND	Jaspal Singh (Transferred from JCT FC)
—	FW	GHA	Yusif Yakubu (Transferred from East Bengal FC)
—	FW	IND	Singam Subhash Singh (Transferred from East Bengal FC)
—	DF	IND	Daniel Albert Vales (Transferred from TFA)
—		IND	Jagdeep Singh (Transferred from TFA)

Out: Note: Flags indicate national team as defined under FIFA eligibility rules; some limited exceptions apply. Players may hold more than one non-FIFA nationality.

No.	Pos.	Nation	Player
—	FW	NGA	Ekene Ikenwa (Transferred to East Bengal FC)
—	DF	IND	Sanjeev Kumar Maria (Transferred to Peerless FC)
—	DF	IND	Melwyn Rodrigues (Transferred to Chirag United)
—		IND	Amit Kumar Nandi (Transferred to Pune FC)
—	FW	IND	Manjit Singh (Transferred to Air India FC)
—	DF	IND	Gurpreet Singh (Transferred to Southern Samity)
—	DF	IND	Bungo Singh (Transferred to Mumbai FC)
—	DF	IND	Lester Fernandez (Transferred to Pune FC)
—		IND	Debasish Kundu (Transferred to Bengal Mumbai FC)
—		IND	Pronoy Roy (Transferred to Southern Samity)
—		IND	Vijesh Kumar (Transferred to HAL SC)
—		IND	Sanath Kumar.R (Transferred to HAL SC)
—		IND	M.Subash Singh (Transferred to Shillong Lajong FC)

== Viva Kerala ==
In: Note: Flags indicate national team as defined under FIFA eligibility rules; some limited exceptions apply. Players may hold more than one non-FIFA nationality.

No.	Pos.	Nation	Player
—		IND	O.K.Javed (Transferred from chandini FC)
—		IND	K.V.Shamil (Transferred from Chandini FC)
—		IND	D.Sajin (Transferred from Josco fC)
—		IND	T.Faisal (Transferred from Akbar Travels)
—	FW	NGA	Ayuba Mbwas Mangut (Transferred from ONGC FC)
—	MF	IND	Kaila Kulothungan (Transferred from Mohun Bagan)
—	DF	IND	Muhammed Muneer (Transferred from Bengal Mumbai FC)
—	MF	IND	V.R.Murugappan (Transferred from Sethu FC)

Out: Note: Flags indicate national team as defined under FIFA eligibility rules; some limited exceptions apply. Players may hold more than one non-FIFA nationality.

No.	Pos.	Nation	Player
—		IND	Sirajudeen (Transferred to Chirag United)
—		IND	Noushad.K (Transferred to Chirag United)
—		IND	M.P.Sakeer (Transferred to Churchill Brothers SC)
—	DF	IND	Amarwant Singh (Transferred to JCT FC)
—		IND	Sarath E.C (Transferred to Bengal Mumbai FC)
—		IND	Arun.S (Transferred to HAL SC)
—		IND	Britto PM (Transferred to Pune FC)
—		IND	Fredy.S (Transferred to ICF Chennai)

== External links/Source ==
https://web.archive.org/web/20110716215154/http://www.the-aiff.com/pages/content/index.php?action=document&id=17

https://web.archive.org/web/20100820150247/http://vivakerala.net/viva/transfers-2010.html

== See also ==
- I-League
