= 2005–06 Santosh Trophy =

2005-06 Santosh Trophy
60th Senior National Football Championship

Tournament details
- Country: India
- Teams: 32

Final positions
- Champions: Goa (4th title)
- Runners-up: Maharashtra

Tournament statistics
- Matches played: 52
- Goals scored: 198 (3.81 per match)
- Top goal scorer: Fredy Mascarenhas (9)

Awards
- Best player: Nicholas Rodrigues

The 2005–06 Santosh Trophy (known as the 60th Air India Express Santosh Trophy 2005–06 for sponsorship reasons) was the 60th edition of the Santosh Trophy. The tournament was held from 4 to 21 November 2005 in Kerala.

Goa won the Santosh Trophy 2005–06 for the fourth time after defeating Maharashtra in the 2005 final at Jawaharlal Nehru Stadium, Kochi after 15 years. Host Kerala claimed third spot after defeating Punjab.

== Teams ==
=== Automatically qualified to the group stage ===
30 States / UT teams of India along with Services and Railways with total of 32 teams participated in the tournament The defending champions Kerala, runners-up Punjab along with last year's losing semi-finalists Services and Manipur receive automatic qualification into the Quarter-final stage.

Teams directly Qualified for Quarter Finals
Kerala
Punjab
Services
Manipur

=== Qualification round entry ===
Cluster I	Cluster II	Cluster III	Cluster IV	Cluster V	Cluster VI	Cluster VII	Cluster VIII
Uttar Pradesh	Delhi	Maharashtra	Assam	Tamil Nadu	Karnataka	Goa	West Bengal
Uttarakhand	Bihar	Orissa	Railways	Jharkhand	Chandigar	Tripura	Mizoram
Madhya Pradesh	Himachal Pradesh	Jammu and Kashmir	Chhattisgarh	Gujarat	Haryana	Rajasthan	Nagaland
		Meghalaya	Pondicherry			Rajasthan	Andhra Pradesh

Legend
Team that qualified for the pre-quarters
Teams that are eliminated

== Stadiums and locations ==
Location of stadiums in Santosh Trophy 2005–06

Stadium	Location	Capacity	Matches
Jawaharlal Nehru Stadium, Kochi	Kochi	60,000	Final, semi-finals and quarter-finals
Municipal Corporation Stadium, Kozhikode	Kozhikode	53,000	Qualifying rounds
Chandrasekharan Nair Stadium	Thiruvananthapuram	25,000	Qualifying rounds
Fertilisers and Chemicals Travancore Ground	Udyogamandalam		Quarter-finals

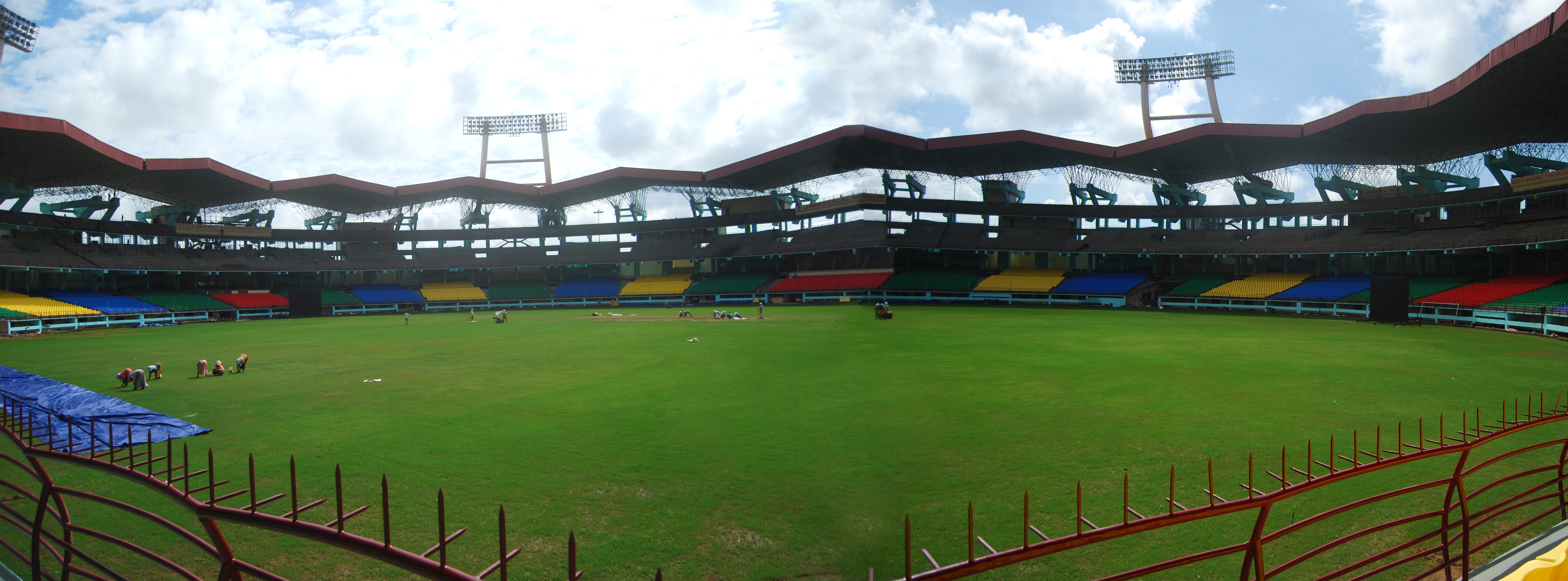
Jawaharlal Nehru Stadium, Kochi, hosted the Semi-finals and Final

== Qualifying rounds ==
Qualifying round held from 4 to 10 November at the venues Chandrasekharan Nair Stadium, Thiruvananthapuram and Municipal Corporation Stadium, Kozhikode. 28 teams participated in qualifying rounds for Quarter final berth.

=== Cluster I - Calicut ===
Team	Pld	W	D	L	GF	GA	GD	Pts
Uttar Pradesh	2	2	0	0	4	1	+3	6
Uttarakhand	2	1	0	1	2	3	−1	3
Madhya Pradesh	2	0	0	2	2	4	−2	0

4 November 2005

Madhya Pradesh	1–2	Uttarakhand
Praveen Nair 27'	Report	Siddharth Thapa 13'; Kundan Kanwal Singh 15'

Municipal Corporation Stadium, Calicut

6 November 2005

Uttar Pradesh	2–0	Uttarakhand
Shamshi Raza 31'; Amit Singh 62'	Report

Municipal Corporation Stadium, Calicut

8 November 2005

Madhya Pradesh	1–2	Uttar Pradesh
Anuj Pratap Singh 90+'	Report	Bhuvan Krishna Joshi 67', 84'

Municipal Corporation Stadium, Calicut

=== Cluster II - Thiruvananthapuram ===
Team	Pld	W	D	L	GF	GA	GD	Pts
Delhi	2	2	0	0	10	0	+10	6
Bihar	2	1	0	1	3	3	0	3
Himachal Pradesh	2	0	0	2	0	10	−10	0

4 November 2005

Delhi	7–0	Himachal Pradesh
Praveen Rawat Singh 10', 59', 87', 89'; Sumit Thapa 62', 88'; Ricky Chakchanak 85'	Report

Chandrasekharan Nair Stadium, Thiruvananthapuram

6 November 2005

Bihar	3–0	Himachal Pradesh
Upendra Kumar 32'; Manoj Raman 81'; Awdhes Kumar 89'	Report

Chandrasekharan Nair Stadium, Thiruvananthapuram

8 November 2005

Delhi	2–0	Uttar Pradesh
Sumit Thapa 32', 52'	Report

Chandrasekharan Nair Stadium, Thiruvananthapuram

=== Cluster III - Thiruvananthapuram ===
Team	Pld	W	D	L	GF	GA	GD	Pts
Maharashtra	3	2	1	0	7	1	+6	7
Orissa	3	2	0	1	6	6	0	6
Jammu and Kashmir	3	0	2	1	4	5	−1	2
Meghalaya	3	0	1	2	3	8	−5	1

4 November 2005

Maharashtra	2–0	Meghalaya
Abhishek Yadav 57'; Sumit Thapa 61'	Report

Chandrasekharan Nair Stadium, Thiruvananthapuram

4 November 2005

Jammu and Kashmir	1–2	Orissa
JK Ishfaq Ahmed 70'	Report	Bijay Ray 28'; Antu Murmu 84'

Chandrasekharan Nair Stadium, Thiruvananthapuram

6 November 2005

Maharashtra	1–1	Jammu and Kashmir
Mehraj Din Wadoo (own Goal) 70'	Report	Bilal Ahmed Wani 11'

Chandrasekharan Nair Stadium, Thiruvananthapuram

6 November 2005

Meghalaya	1–4	Orissa
Rogesterwell Basaiawmdit 46'	Report	Gyan Ranjan Samal 2', 33', 59'; Rajendra Prasad Singh 24'

Chandrasekharan Nair Stadium, Thiruvananthapuram

8 November 2005

Jammu and Kashmir	2–2	Meghalaya
	Report

Chandrasekharan Nair Stadium, Thiruvananthapuram

9 November 2005

Maharashtra	4–0	Orissa
Paresh Shivalkar 46'; Soccor Velho 55'; Abhishek Yadav 66', 71'	Report

Chandrasekharan Nair Stadium, Thiruvananthapuram

=== Cluster IV - Calicut ===
Team	Pld	W	D	L	GF	GA	GD	Pts
Assam	3	3	0	0	17	2	+15	9
Railways	3	2	0	1	13	2	+11	6
Chhattisgarh	3	1	0	2	4	15	−11	3
Pondicherry	3	0	0	3	0	15	−15	0

4 November 2005

Railways	4–0	Chhattisgarh
Kasif Jamal 32', 90+3'; PV Vinoy 40'; S Suresh Kumar 78'	Report

Chandrasekharan Nair Stadium, Thiruvananthapuram

4 November 2005

Pondicherry	0–5	Assam
	Report	Nitu Narzary 17'; Rahajuddin Ahmed 31', 35'; Manikanta Brahma 61'; Thomson Langthasa 86'

Municipal Corporation Stadium, Calicut

6 November 2005

Railways	8–0	Pondicherry
Ashim Biswas 2', 4', 17', 37'; Kasif Jamal 14', 57', 84'; PV Vinoy 28'	Report

Municipal Corporation Stadium, Calicut

6 November 2005

Assam	10–1	Chhattisgarh
Manikanta Brahma 14', 33', 90+1'; Sanjiva Rongpi 31', 37', 74'; Khirod Das 57'; Rahajuddin Ahmed 59'; Nitu Narzary 68'; Thong Tham Kom 87'	Report	Laxmendra Kumar 52'

Municipal Corporation Stadium, Calicut

8 November 2005

Pondicherry	1–3	Chhattisgarh
Anas 24'	Report	Kulwant Singh 40', 43'; Krishna Naidu 90'

Municipal Corporation Stadium, Calicut

8 November 2005

Railways	1–2	Assam
Kasif Jamal 54'	Report	Sanjiva Rongpi 40', 61'

Municipal Corporation Stadium, Calicut

=== Cluster V - Thiruvananthapuram ===
Team	Pld	W	D	L	GF	GA	GD	Pts
Tamil Nadu	2	1	1	0	3	1	+2	4
Jharkhand	2	0	2	0	3	3	0	2
Gujarat	2	0	1	1	2	4	−2	1

5 November 2005

Tamil Nadu	2–0	Gujarat
Kalia Kulothungan 44', 64'	Report

Chandrasekharan Nair Stadium, Thiruvananthapuram

7 November 2005

Jharkhand	2–2	Gujarat
Vimal Pariyar 44', 64'	Report	Vishnu Chauhan 5'; Mehul Rana 86'

Chandrasekharan Nair Stadium, Thiruvananthapuram

9 November 2005

Tamil Nadu	1–1	Jharkhand
Jegan 88'	Report	Mirja Besra 38'

Chandrasekharan Nair Stadium, Thiruvananthapuram

=== Cluster VI - Calicut ===
Team	Pld	W	D	L	GF	GA	GD	Pts
Karnataka	2	1	1	0	2	1	+1	4
Chandigarh	2	1	0	1	1	1	0	3
Haryana	2	0	1	1	1	2	−1	1

5 November 2005

Karnataka	1–0	Chandigarh
Shanmugam Venkatesh 30'	Report

Municipal Corporation Stadium, Calicut

7 November 2005

Chandigarh	1–0	Haryana
Sameer Singh 15'	Report

Municipal Corporation Stadium, Calicut

7 November 2005

Karnataka	1–1	Haryana
Xavier Vijayakumar 17'	Report	Praveen Arora] 36'

Municipal Corporation Stadium, Calicut

=== Cluster VII - Calicut ===
Team	Pld	W	D	L	GF	GA	GD	Pts
Goa	3	3	0	0	32	0	+32	9
Sikkim	3	1	1	1	5	12	−7	4
Tripura	3	1	1	1	4	16	−12	4
Rajasthan	3	0	0	3	1	14	−13	0

5 November 2005

Goa	8–0	Rajasthan
Anthony Pereira 27'; Freddy Mascarenhas 37', 59', 79'; Climax Lawrence 51'; Mahesh Gawli 61'; Joaquim Abranches 90+2'	Report

Municipal Corporation Stadium, Calicut

5 November 2005

Tripura	1–1	Sikkim
Amarjit Singh 12'	Report	Bigen Tamang 72'

Municipal Corporation Stadium, Calicut

7 November 2005

Goa	15–0	Tripura
Clifford Miranda 12'; Anthony Pereira 17', 55'; Freddy Mascarenhas 18', 22', 29', 39', 42', 54'; Rodrigues 63', 70', 83'; Nicolas Borges 35', 38'; Alvito Rodrigues 90'	Report

Municipal Corporation Stadium, Calicut

7 November 2005

Sikkim	4–1	Rajasthan
Birbahadur Pradhan 4', 32', 72'; Milan Lepcha 83'	Report	Rajesh Shyam 56'

Municipal Corporation Stadium, Calicut

9 November 2005

Tripura	3–0	Rajasthan
Sathyajit Dev Roy 34', 52'; Shyamal Bhowmick 51'	Report

Municipal Corporation Stadium, Calicut

9 November 2005

Goa	10–0	Sikkim
Anthony Pereira 8'; Rodrigues 33'; Climax Lawrence 35', 40', 45+1', 85'; Nicolas Borges 48'; Joaquim Abranches 61', 83'; Samir Naik 76'	Report

Municipal Corporation Stadium, Calicut

=== Cluster VIII -Thiruvananthapuram ===
Team	Pld	W	D	L	GF	GA	GD	Pts
West Bengal	3	1	2	0	6	3	+3	5
Mizoram	3	1	2	0	6	4	+2	5
Nagaland	3	0	2	1	4	6	−2	2
Andhra Pradesh	3	0	2	1	3	6	−3	2

5 November 2005

West Bengal	2–2	Nagaland
Dipendu Biswas 12'; Syed Rahim Nabi 45+1'	Report	Temjen Kibang 44'; Vizorü Peseyie 76'

Chandrasekharan Nair Stadium, Thiruvananthapuram

5 November 2005

Andhra Pradesh	2–2	Mizoram
Mohammed Quizar 14'; MD Fareed 73'	Report	Shylo Malswam Tulunga 25'; Pachau Lalam Puia 67'

Chandrasekharan Nair Stadium, Thiruvananthapuram

7 November 2005

West Bengal	3–0	Andhra Pradesh
Dipendu Biswas 8'; Sasthi Duley 64'; Syed Rahim Nabi 89'	Report

Chandrasekharan Nair Stadium, Thiruvananthapuram

7 November 2005

Nagaland	1–3	Mizoram
Yapong 18'	Report	Jerry Zirsanga 32'; Vanlal Rovay 59'; Shylo Malswam Tulunga 60'

Chandrasekharan Nair Stadium, Thiruvananthapuram

9 November 2005

Andhra Pradesh	1–2	Nagaland
Mohammed Fareed 67'	Report	Leipakchao 81'

Chandrasekharan Nair Stadium, Thiruvananthapuram

== Quarterfinal League ==
Quarterfinal rounds held from 11 to 17 November at the venue Jawaharlal Nehru Stadium, Kochi. Cheer girls, helicopter fly, sky diving, cultural programmes and mass drill was held to the kick-off of the main leg of the 60th Air India Express-Santosh Trophy national football tournament at Kochi on 11 November 2005. 4500 students from 25 schools and three colleges in the City lined up for mass drills, folk dances, traditional art forms while another 1000 students conducted special balloon display.

=== Group A ===
Team	Pld	W	D	L	GF	GA	GD	Pts
Kerala	2	2	0	0	4	0	+4	6
Uttar Pradesh	2	1	0	1	2	1	+1	3
Delhi	2	0	0	2	0	5	−5	0

11 November 2005	Kerala	1–0	Uttar Pradesh	Kochi
	MA Abdul Hakkim 71'	Report		Stadium: Jawaharlal Nehru Stadium

15 November 2005	Uttar Pradesh	2–0	Delhi	Udyogamandalam
15:00 IST	Bhuvan Joshi; Prahlad Rawat	Report		Stadium: Fertilisers and Chemicals Travancore Ground

16 November 2005	Kerala	3–0	Delhi	Kochi
17:00 IST	Ajayan 71'; MA Abdul Hakkim 53'; Pradeep 67'	Report		Stadium: Jawaharlal Nehru Stadium

=== Group B ===
Team	Pld	W	D	L	GF	GA	GD	Pts
Punjab	2	1	1	0	4	2	+2	4
Karnataka	2	1	1	0	3	2	+1	4
Tamil Nadu	2	0	0	2	0	3	−3	0

13 November 2005	Punjab	2–2	Karnataka	Kochi
08:00 IST	Taranjit Singh 27'; Yadwinder Singh 71'	Report	Venkatesh 62'; Rajendra Prasad 84'	Stadium: Jawaharlal Nehru Stadium

15 November 2005	Tamil Nadu	0–1	Karnataka	Kochi
19:00 IST	Amrutharaja 48' (o.g.)	Report		Stadium: Jawaharlal Nehru Stadium

17 November 2005	Punjab	2–0	Tamil Nadu	Kochi
17:00 IST	Gyan Moyon Thapa 51'; Charanjit Singh 83'	Report		Stadium: Jawaharlal Nehru Stadium

=== Group C ===
Team	Pld	W	D	L	GF	GA	GD	Pts
Maharashtra	2	2	0	0	7	3	+4	6
West Bengal	2	1	0	1	3	4	−1	3
Services	2	0	0	2	5	8	−3	0

11 November 2005	Services	3–5	Maharashtra	Kochi
	L Danny 33', 70'; A Thirunavukarasu 67'	Report	Abhishek Yadav 28', 37', 77'; Soccor Velho 41', 49'	Stadium: Jawaharlal Nehru Stadium

15 November 2005	Maharashtra	2–0	West Bengal	Kochi
17:00 IST	Reuben D'Souza 58'; Shivalkar 64'	Report		Stadium: Jawaharlal Nehru Stadium

16 November 2005	Services	2–3	West Bengal	Kochi
19:00 IST	L Danny 71'; Shaji D'Silva 73'	Report	Jayanta Sen 26'; Raman Vijayan 51'; S. Ramesh 85' (o.g.)	Stadium: Jawaharlal Nehru Stadium

=== Group D ===
Team	Pld	W	D	L	GF	GA	GD	Pts
Goa	2	1	1	0	7	1	+6	4
Manipur	2	1	1	0	4	2	+2	4
Assam	2	0	0	2	1	9	−8	0

12 November 2005	Manipur	3–1	Assam	Kochi
	Sushil Kumar 23'; Samson Singh 70'; Dharamjit Singh 90+1'	Report	Sanjiva Rongpi 83'	Stadium: Jawaharlal Nehru Stadium; Attendance: 300

15 November 2005	Assam	0–6	Goa	Udyogamandalam
08:30 IST		Report	Pereira 12', 26', 45', 53'; Lawrence 16'; Miranda 25'	Stadium: Fertilisers and Chemicals Travancore Ground

16 November 2005	Manipur	0–1	Goa	Kochi
19:00 IST	T. Singh 87'	Report	Lawrence 89'	Stadium: Jawaharlal Nehru Stadium; Referee: Shaji C. Kurian (Kerala)

== Semi-finals ==
18 November 2005
19:00 IST

Kerala	0–1	Maharashtra
	Report	Reuben D'Souza 49'

Jawaharlal Nehru Stadium, Kochi

19 November 2005
19:00 IST

Punjab	0–2	Goa
	Report	Carvalho 14'; Rodrigues 48'

Jawaharlal Nehru Stadium, Kochi

== Third place play-off ==
20 November 2005
19:00 IST

Kerala	2–1	Punjab
Pradeep 57'; Saheer 79'	Report	Narinder Singh 68'

Jawaharlal Nehru Stadium, Kochi

== Final ==
21 November 2005
19:00 IST

Maharashtra	1–3 (a.e.t.)	Goa
Velho 73'; Hekmat Singh (yellow card) 106'	Report	Philip Gomes 74'; Rodrigues 105'; Abranches 115'; Rodrigues (yellow card) 21'; Abranches (yellow card) 81'

Jawaharlal Nehru Stadium, Kochi
Referee: Shaji C. Kurian (Kerala)

Winning Goa Team with Santosh Trophy

=== Awards ===
Best Player: Nicholas Rodrigues

=== Statistics ===
Maharashtra	Match Statistics	Goa
1	Goals scored	3
9	Total shots	12
3	Shots on target	4
6	Shots off target	8
12	Corner kicks	7
21	Fouls committed	13
3	Offsides	8
2	Yellow cards	1
0	Second yellow card & red card	0
0	Red cards	0

=== Prizes ===
The Kerala Chief Minister, Oommen Chandy gave away the trophies. Besides the top prize and a cheque of Rs. 5 lakhs, the winning team also received Rs. 1 lakh announced by the Goa Sports Minister, Pandurang Madkikar .

== Top scorers ==
Rank	Player	State	Goals
1	Fredy Mascarenhas	Goa	9
2	Kasif Jamal	Railways	6
3	Sanjiv Rongpi	Assam	5
4	Ashim Biswas	Railways	4
4	Anthony Pereira	Goa	4
4	Nicholas Rodrigues	Goa	4
4	Climax Lawrence	Goa	4
4	Praveen Rawat	Delhi	4
4	Sumit Thapa	Delhi	4

== Controversy ==
In a Group D match between Goa and Manipur on 17 November 2005, the referee Shaji C. Kurian allowed Goa to restart the game even as most of the Manipur players were celebrating Tomba Singh's goal in the 87th minute from a free kick. With the Manipur players unsettled for restart, Climax Lawrence rode on a break from the right and scored past Manipur goalkeeper Ingobi Singh. The Manipuri players argued with referee Kurian, disputing the restart. Police was called in due to be some shoving and pushing between players and there was some argument between the Manipur players and the local police. Game has only resumed after Manipur's coach Ekendra Singh and manager Dinamani Singh entered the ground and asked Manipur players to finish off the game. Even though the match ended in a tie, Goa advanced to the semifinals with their superior goal difference in Group D. Immediately after the incident, the Manipur team manager lodged a complaint contending violation of Rule No. 8 of the Laws of the Game, and Article No. 15 of the Regulation of the Championship.

The All Manipur Football Association decided to boycott the national Under-19 and Under-14 football tournaments organized by the All India Football Federation in protest against a referee's decision People of Manipur gave a rousing welcome to the players and officials of the State team which participated in the 60th Air India Express Santosh trophy football Tournament on their arrival at Imphal. To protest the biased decision of the referee, Manipur Students Federation had organised only sit-in-protest demonstration and imposed a 22-hour general strike on the day the final match. The All India Football Federation (AIFF) on 18 December 2005 decided to retain Goa as the champions of the Santosh Trophy rejecting Manipur's appeal, which had asked the AIFF to strip the champions of the title.

== Telecast ==
Zee Sports telecasted the 16 matches from the quarterfinals onwards live. John Helm and Russell Osman have been hired as commentators. The telecast packages included preview and review shows, half time match analysis. Music and dance performances by renowned bands during the half time and in between the two matches. Special performance by Zebra's was there to entertain the crowds before the start of each match. Zee provided soccer fans with the latest team news, match scores, statistics and player profiles, as well as exclusive player interviews and photo galleries.
