= Soccor Velho =

Indian footballer (1983–2013)

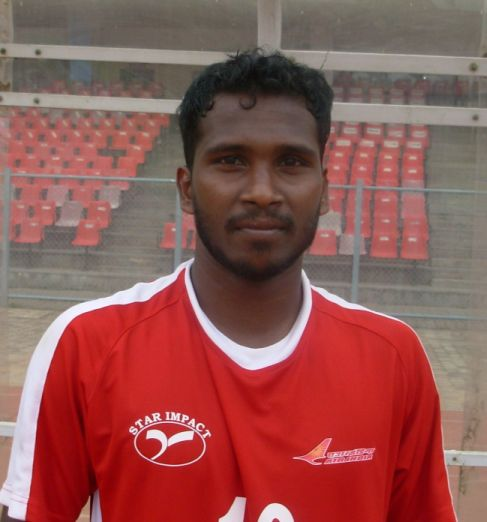
- Velho pictured in 2011

Personal information
- Date of birth: 27 July 1983
- Place of birth: Goa, India
- Date of death: 22 June 2013 (aged 29)
- Place of death: Margao, Goa, India
- Height: 1.74 m (5 ft 8 1/2 in)
- Position: Midfielder

Senior career*
Years	Team	Apps	(Gls)
2003–2005	Cabral SC		
2005–2006	Golden Gunners		
2006	→ Air India (loan)		(0)
2006–2007	Central Railway		
2007–2013	Air India		
- * Club domestic league appearances and goals

Soccor Velho (27 July 1983 – 22 June 2013) was an Indian footballer who last played for Air India in the I-League. He previously played for Cabral, Golden Gunners and Central Railway.

== Life and career ==
Velho was born in Goa, where he played football for Cabral before joining Golden Gunners of the Mumbai District Football Association's Elite Division in 2005. Described in the Hindustan Times as "the potent firepower in Golden Gunners arsenal", Velho scored seven of Gunners' twelve goals as they finished in fourth place and qualified for the championship stage, but was not afraid to admit he needed to work on his finishing. He represented Maharashtra in the 2005–06 Santosh Trophy, scored four goals as his team progressed through the group stages, and flicked on Rauf Khan's corner to open the scoring in the final, albeit in a losing cause as Goa won 3–1 after extra time. Rated by Daily News and Analysis as one of the "finds of the tournament", he was named among the "probables" by the All India Football Federation for the 2005 SAFF Cup but did not play.

He signed on loan for Air India in January 2006. He made several appearances in the National Football League, without scoring, though he had a "goal" against Mahindra United disallowed for handball. Coach Bimal Ghosh attributed his goal drought to inexperience and needing "a bit of luck".

In the latter part of 2006, he returned to regional competition with Central Railway, contributing to their second-place finish in the Mumbai Elite Division and scoring once as they finished fourth in the championship round. He scored just twice in the Elite Division as Central Railway finished in fourth place in 2007. In July, Velho scored a hat-trick as Central Railway beat Air India's under-19 team 7–1 in the quarter-final of the Nadkarni Cup; in the final, he opened the scoring as Central Railway beat ONGC 3–1.

Velho signed for Air India ahead of the 2008–09 I-League season, and made his debut on the opening day of the season, in a 1–1 draw away to Mohammedan Sporting. He scored his first I-League goal on the second matchday, away to Mohun Bagan; just before half-time, Napoleon Singh's free kick was poorly cleared and Velho, playing as an attacking midfielder, was first to react. After the next game, Air India's first win of the season, coach Ghosh commented favourably on the pace and positioning of both Velho and goalscorer Surojit Roy, particularly on the counter-attack. Velho scored once more during the season, in a 2–0 win against Mumbai FC in November. He sustained a facial injury in an incident in January 2009 in which Mohammedan Sporting's Madhab Das was sent off; according to Goal.com's Rahul Bali in March, "[he hadn't] been at his best ever since". Air India avoided relegation by just two points.

Under Velho's captaincy, Air India finished one point nearer relegation in 2009–10. He scored the opening goal in the IFA Shield semifinal, only for his club to be eliminated by Churchill Brothers on penalties.

=== Death ===
On 22 June 2013 Velho participated in a friendly match between Margao XI and the India U19 team in Goa. Velho played for Margao in that match and lasted the whole 90 minutes. After the match Velho went home. According to the Salgaocar youth team coach, Joaquim Crasto, Soccor was completely fine after the game and went home normally. After he arrived home, according to Dempo forward Joy Ferrao, Velho had dinner and a shower but then complained of feeling uneasy before having a heart attack. He died on his way to the hospital; he was 29.

Velho was survived by his wife and young daughter.
