= 2009 IFA Shield =

২০০৯ আইএফএ শিল্ড

Tournament details
- Country: India
- Teams: 12

Final positions
- Champions: Churchill Brothers (1st title)
- Runners-up: Mohun Bagan

Tournament statistics
- Matches played: 15
- Goals scored: 34 (2.27 per match)

The 2009 IFA Shield was an association football tournament organised by the Indian Football Association. Most of the teams came from the I-League 1 & 2, with AS Douanes (Dakar) invited from Senegal and Tata Football Academy qualifying by winning the Prodyut Dutta Memorial Trophy. The Shield was won by Churchill Brothers SC.

The teams were divided into 4 groups of 3 teams each. The winner of each group will qualify for the semifinals. The tournament started on 30 August and the final was played on 12 September. ESPN televised the two semifinals and final live from the Yuba Bharati Krirangan in Saltlake.

The probable venues would be Mohun Bagan ground, East Bengal ground, Howrah Municipal Stadium, Barasat Stadium and Kalyani Municipal Stadium.

== Groups ==
Group A	Group B	Group C	Group D
East Bengal; Chirag United; Tata Football Academy	Mohammedan SC; Churchill Brothers; Shillong Lajong FC	Mohun Bagan; Mahindra United; George Telegraph SC	Air-India; Pune (Senegal) AS Douanes

- Tata Football Academy won a thrilling Prodyut Dutta Memorial Trophy final against West Bengal Police to qualify for the 114th IFA Shield.
- Viva Kerala withdrew from the tournament due to failure to register players on time.

== Tables and results ==
=== Group A ===
Team	Pld	W	D	L	GF	GA	GD	Pts
(India) Chirag United	2	1	1	0	5	3	+2	4
(India) Tata Football Academy	2	1	1	0	4	2	+2	4
(India) East Bengal	2	0	0	2	3	7	−4	0

1 September 2009

Chirag United	1–1	Tata Football Academy

3 September 2009

East Bengal	1–3	Tata Football Academy

5 September 2009

East Bengal	2–4	Chirag United

=== Group B ===
Team	Pld	W	D	L	GF	GA	GD	Pts
(India) Churchill Brothers	2	1	1	0	3	1	+2	4
(India) Mohammedan SC	2	1	1	0	2	1	+1	4
(India) Shillong Lajong FC	2	0	0	2	0	3	−3	0

30 August 2009

Mohammedan SC	1–0	Shillong Lajong

2 September 2009

Mohammedan SC	1–1	Churchill Brothers

4 September 2009

Churchill Brothers	2–0	Shillong Lajong

=== Group C ===
Team	Pld	W	D	L	GF	GA	GD	Pts
(India) Mohun Bagan	2	1	1	0	5	1	+4	4
(India) Mahindra United	2	1	1	0	3	1	+2	4
(India) George Telegraph SC	2	0	0	2	0	6	−6	0

1 September 2009

Mahindra United	2–0	George Telegraph

4 September 2009

Mohun Bagan	4–0	George Telegraph SC
Chidi Edeh 3', 40'; James Singh 38'; Subho Kumar 87'	Report; MBAC

6 September 2009

Mohun Bagan	1–1	Mahindra United
Snehasish Chakraborty 30'	Report	Mijin 47'

=== Group D ===
Team	Pld	W	D	L	GF	GA	GD	Pts
Air India	2	1	1	0	2	1	+1	4
(India) Pune	2	1	0	1	3	2	+1	3
(Senegal) AS Douanes	2	0	1	1	0	2	−2	1

1 September 2009

Air-India	2–1	Pune

4 September 2009

AS Douanes (Senegal)	0–0	Air-India

6 September 2009

AS Douanes (Senegal)	0–2	Pune

== Semi-finals ==
8 September 2009
15:05

Churchill Brothers	1–1	Air India
Reisangmei Vashum 76'		Rowilson Rodrigues 14'
Penalties
	4–2

Saltlake Stadium, Calcutta
Referee: Minangsu Bhattacharya (West Bengal)

9 September 2009
15:05

Chirag United	0–0	Mohun Bagan
	Report
Penalties
(penalty missed) Jayanta Sen; (penalty scored) Lalawmpuia; (penalty scored) Edu; (penalty scored) Lal Kamal Bhowmick; (penalty scored) Subhasish Roy Chowdhury	4–5	Marcos Pereira (penalty scored); Rakesh Masih (penalty scored); Snehasish Chakraborty (penalty scored); Surkumar Singh (penalty scored); James Singh (penalty scored)

Saltlake Stadium, Calcutta
Referee: Om Prakash Thakur

== Final ==
12 September 2009
15:05

Churchill Brothers	2–0	Mohun Bagan
Vashum 41'; Okolie 45'	Report

Saltlake Stadium, Calcutta
Referee: Laba Khatri

IFA Shield
2009 winners

1st title
