= Emmanuel Akwuegbu =

Nigerian footballer

Personal information
- Date of birth: 20 December 1978 (age 47)
- Place of birth: Nigeria

Youth career
- 199?–1997: RC Lens

Senior career*
Years	Team	Apps	(Gls)
1997–1999	RC Lens B		
1999–2003	SW Bregenz		
2003–2005	FC Waidhofen/Ybbs		
2005–2006	Stuttgarter Kickers	26	(8)
2006–2008	SV Sandhausen	41	(14)
2008–2009	SV Elversberg	10	(0)
2009–2010	FC Dornbirn 1913	5	(0)
2010–2011	Sporting Clube de Goa		
- * Club domestic league appearances and goals

Emmanuel Akwuegbu (born 20 December 1978 in Nigeria) is a Nigerian-Austrian football coach and retired footballer.

== Career ==
=== Germany ===
Chalking up five goals as Stuttgarter Kickers got three points four times in a row leading up to December 2005, Akuwegbu contract ended with the Kickers next July, but engaged in a conflict with them, stating that his contract was still valid until 2007. However, extenuating circumstances allowed the management to officially end the contract. The Nigerian-Austrian then went on to stay with SV Sandhausen until 2008 and SV Elversberg until 2009.

=== India ===
Hitting a hat-trick on his debut as Sporting Clube de Goa put six past Malabar United at the 2010 Indian Federation Cup, the former Lens man was involved in a road accident that fall, causing him to be sidelined and eventually released.
