= Kolkata Derby =

Association football derby in India

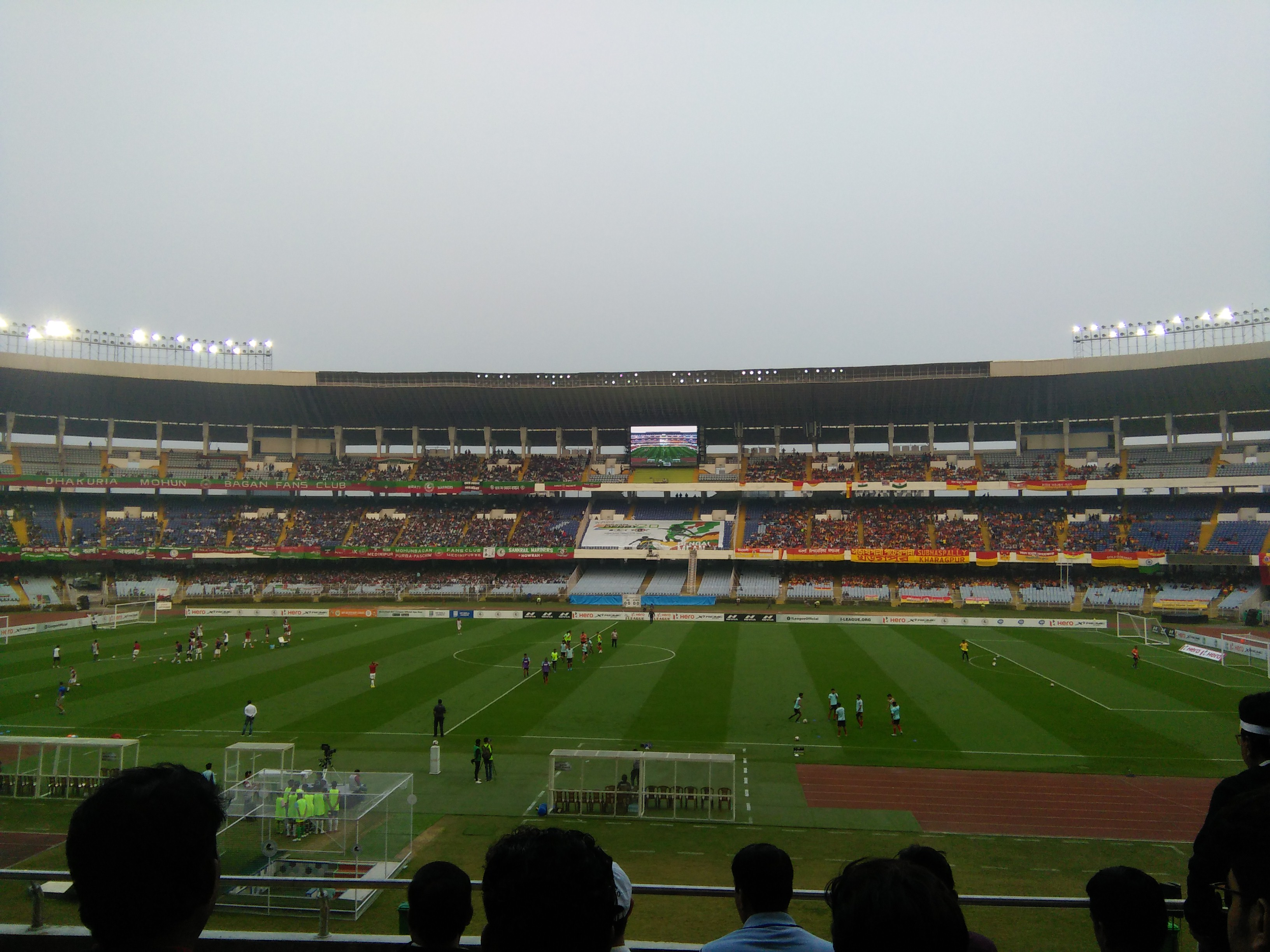
- The Vivekananda Yuba Bharati Krirangan on a matchday of Kolkata Derby in 2020
- Other names: Boro Match (Big Match)
- Location: Kolkata, West Bengal
- Teams: Mohun Bagan; East Bengal
- First meeting: Mohun Bagan 0–0 East Bengal in (Cooch Behar Cup) on 8 August 1921 (unofficial); East Bengal 1–0 Mohun Bagan in (Calcutta Football League) on 28 May 1925 (official)
- Latest meeting: Mohun Bagan 1–0 East Bengal in (2026 IFA Shield) on 8th October 2026
- Broadcasters: Sports18 (Indian Super League)
- Stadiums: Vivekananda Yuba Bharati Krirangan; Mohun Bagan Ground; East Bengal Ground; Kanchenjunga Stadium; Eden Gardens

Statistics
- Total meetings: Total: 412; Competitive: 385
- Most wins: East Bengal (145)
- Top scorer: Bhaichung Bhutia (19)
- All-time series: Total: East Bengal: 145 Mohun Bagan: 136 Drawn: 131; Competitive: East Bengal: 139 Mohun Bagan: 125 Drawn: 121
- Largest victory: East Bengal 5–0; Mohun Bagan; 30 September 1975 (IFA Shield Final)
- Largest goal scoring: Mohun Bagan 5–3; East Bengal; 25 October 2009 (I-League)
- Longest win streak: Mohun Bagan (8) (2019–2023)
- Location of the two teams in Kolkata, as well as Vivekananda Yuba Bharati Krirangan, the shared home ground of the two clubs.

The Kolkata Derby (locally known as "Boro Match" i.e. "Big Match") is the football match in Kolkata, between Mohun Bagan and East Bengal. The rivalry between these two teams dates back to over a century, and the matches witnessed large audience attendance and rivalry between patrons. It is considered to be the biggest Asian footballing rivalry. The first match was played on 8 August 1921 in Cooch Behar Cup. The Kolkata Derby is considered to be greatest derby in Asian Football and also one of the biggest derbies in the world.

The two clubs meet at least three times a year, twice in the Indian Super League and once in the Calcutta Football League. Often these two clubs met in other competitions like the Durand Cup, IFA Shield and Super Cup.

Both clubs have large and dedicated fan bases around the world, and represent specific sections of Bengali people, Mohun Bagan represents people of western part of Bengal (known as Ghotis), while East Bengal represents people from eastern part of pre-independence Bengal (known as Bangals). Culturally, this derby is similar to the Scottish Professional Football League's Old Firm derby, since the Mohun Bagan supporters represent the 'nativist' population of Indian Bengalis' (similar to Rangers) and the East Bengal fans represent the 'immigrant' population coming from Bangladesh (similar to Celtic). The celebrations of a derby win is traditionally marked with dishes prepared from either ilish or golda chingri, depending on which team wins. The East Bengal supporters celebrate their win with ilish courses, being associated to the eastern region of Bengal (now Bangladesh), where as the Mohun Bagan fans celebrate with courses of golda chingri.

== Origins ==
Mohun Bagan is one of the oldest existing club of India having been established in 1889 in the city, then known under its anglicized name, Calcutta and till date one of the two most successful clubs in India, the other being East Bengal. The significant British influence in what was, until 1911, the nation's capital, ensured the game flourished, drawing players from other regions, and it is against this backdrop in which today's rivalry took root.

In 1920, the Jora Bagan club took field against Mohun Bagan who chose play without their star halfback Sailesh Bose, much to the chagrin of club vice-president Suresh Chandra Chaudhuri. Such was the industrialist's displeasure, he decided to form a new club and East Bengal was born. As Chaudhuri and his co-founders hailed from eastern part of Bengal, essentially now modern-day Bangladesh, the club became an identity for the people who migrated from that region during the partition of Bengal. This resulted in the clubs being backed by two different socioeconomic groups, although this has largely changed over period of time. The first ever clash happened on 8 August 1921 in Cooch Behar Cup semifinal which ended in a goalless draw. Mohun Bagan would win the following replayed match on 10 August 1921 by defeating East Bengal 3–0, courtesy to the goals from Rabi Ganguly, Poltu Dasgupta and Abhilash Ghosh. But the first official meeting is considered to be the CFL match-up held on 28 May 1925 at the Calcutta Football Ground (now Mohun Bagan Ground) where East Bengal won 1–0 with the help of a solitary goal from Nepal Chakraborty.

As of 2026, it is believed that the tally of overall meetings stands at 412 matches up till now, where East Bengal have been triumphant 145 and Mohun Bagan 136 times and 131 ended in draw, which also includes walkover wins.

Among these two historic clubs, Mohun Bagan has won a total of 197 tournaments, while East Bengal has won 163 tournaments.

== Colours ==
=== Traditional ===
The earliest kit worn by the Mohun Bagan	The earliest kit worn by the East Bengal

=== Current ===
Mohun Bagan	East Bengal

== History ==
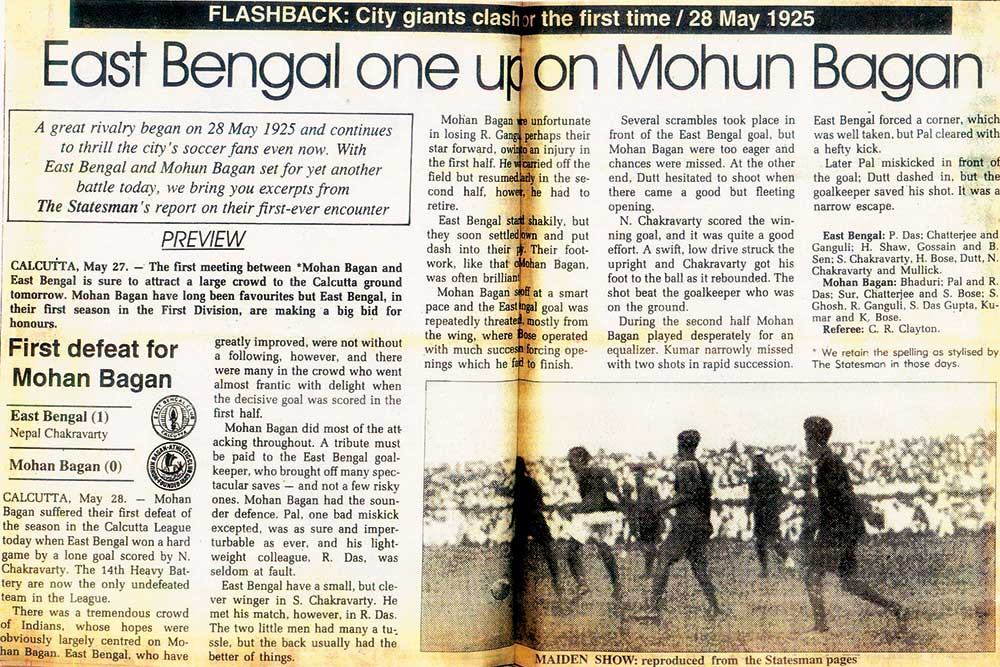
News report, by The Statesman, of first official Kolkata Derby, that took place on 28 May 1925.

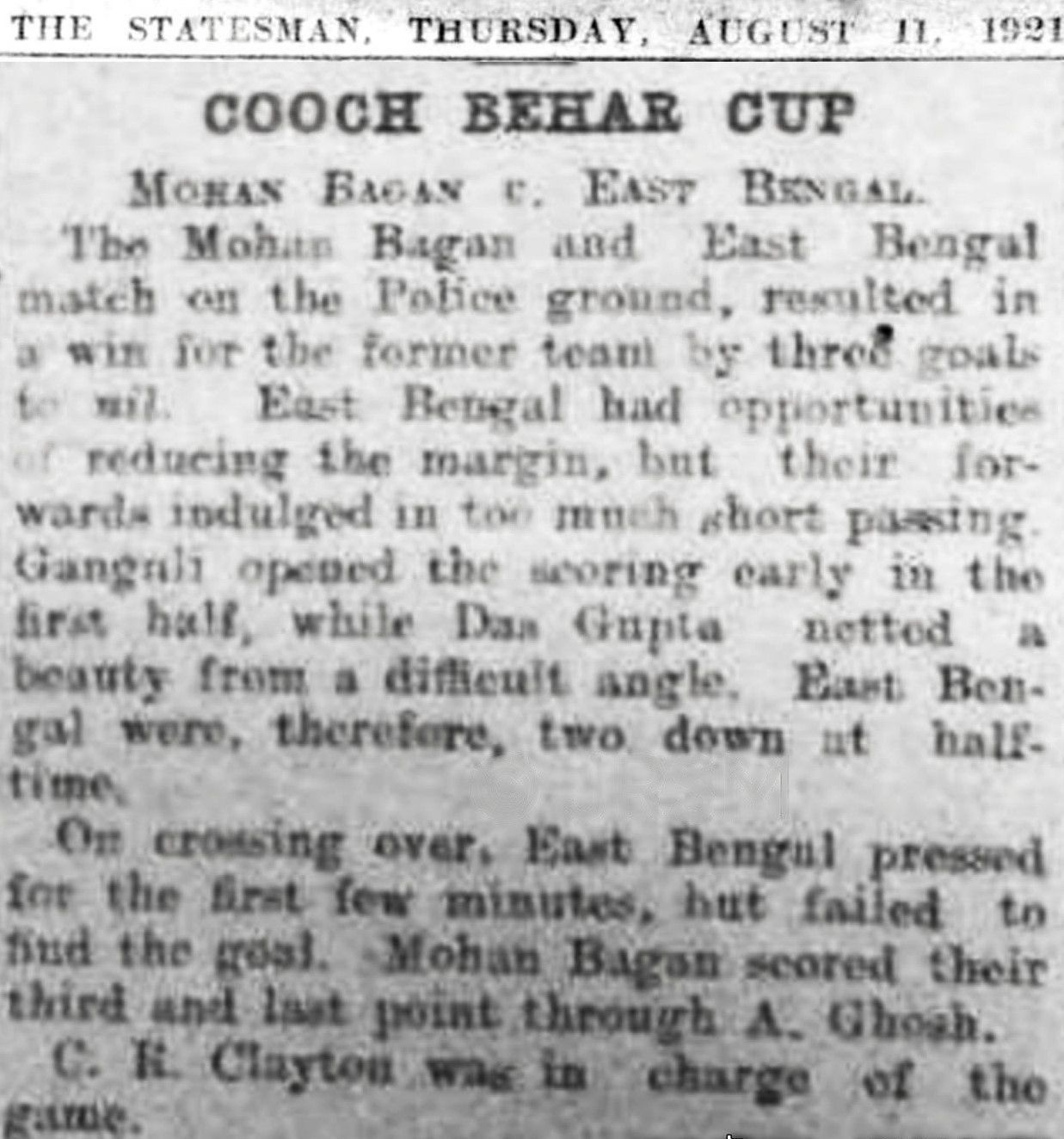
News report, by The Statesman, of second Kolkata Derby, that took place on 10 August 1921, which was the replayed semi-final of Cooch Behar Cup after it went into a goalless draw the first time.

The first match between the sides was played on 8 August 1921 in the Coochbehar Cup, and the semifinal match ended in a 0–0 draw. Mohun Bagan won the replayed semifinal 3–0 on 10 August 1921 which was the first-ever win in this historic derby. Rabi Ganguly scored the first-ever derby goal in that match, and the other two goals were scored by Poltu Dasgupta and Abhilash Ghosh.

The first official match between the sides was played on 28 May 1925 in CFL, where East Bengal beat Mohun Bagan 1–0 with the help of a solitary goal from Nepal Chakraborty.

Mohun Bagan holds the record of scoring the fastest goal in a derby (24 July 1976, a 17-second goal from Md Akbar of Mohun Bagan). They have the record of winning two consecutive derbies on two successive days (7 and 8 August 1935) and had the unique distinction of losing only one derby in 7 years (1933 to 1939). During this phase, they won 29 trophies. Out of 23 derbies they won 12, drew 10 and lost only 1 against their arch-rivals. It was a golden period in the history of the club.

A few notable victories include the Darbhanga Shield match on 5 September 1934, when Mohun Bagan won 4–1 (Amiya Deb scored all four goals). Another memorable instance where they scored four goals against was in Raja Memorial Shield final played on 6 August 1937 at the common ground of both the clubs (Eden Gardens Stadium), where Mohun Bagan beat East Bengal 4–0 and Asit Ganguly scored three goals in that match.

The 1960s proved a golden period for Mohun Bagan and it concluded in perfect fashion for the Mariners. Having already won the league, Mohun Bagan then did the double, defeating their rivals on their own ground in the IFA Shield final. The 3–1 victory credited to the then revolutionary 4–2–4 formation employed by innovative coach Amal Dutta.

The wheel eventually turned, and the 1970s was East Bengal's decade. The Red and Gold Brigade remained undefeated in the Derbies for 1932 days. (Note: East Bengal FC lost to Mohun Bagan, first time since their 3–1 defeat in the IFA Shield Final on 20 September 1969, after 1932 days, on 5 January 1975, in the Durand Cup Semi Final at the Ambedkar Stadium, Delhi by 1–0.) In fact, they lost only one derby (that too outside Kolkata) in six years (1970 to 1975) which culminated in a 5–0 IFA Shield win over their great rivals. The Red and Golds won with a record 5–0 scoreline and, with it, a record of five consecutive Shield victories. Such was the ignominy surrounding the heavy defeat that several Mohun Bagan players spent the night holed up on a boat in the Ganges trying to escape the wrath of shell-shocked supporters. Umakanto Palodhi, an ardent Mohun Bagan fan, committed suicide. He wrote in his suicide note that in his next life he will born as a Mohun Bagan footballer and will take revenge of that 0–5 defeat.

On 16 August 1980, 16 football fans died due to stampede and riot inside the Eden Gardens stadium, Kolkata on the occasion of a Kolkata Derby match in the Calcutta Football League. It is now remembered as Football Lover's Day.

The most memorable derby on many accounts took place in 1997 at the semi-final of the Federation Cup, when a remarkable crowd of 1,31,781 – a record attendance for any sport in India – filled a heaving Salt Lake Stadium. India's most recognizable footballer, Baichung Bhutia, took centre stage, scoring a hat-trick as East Bengal triumphed 4–1.

On 25 October 2009, Mohun Bagan beat East Bengal 5–3 with Chidi Edeh scoring a hat-trick for Bagan (4 goals) in an I-League encounter.

On 6 September 2015, another memorable derby took place when East Bengal FC equaled the record for the highest margin of victory in a Calcutta Football League Derby as they triumphed 4–0 against Mohun Bagan. South Korean forward Do Dong-hyun scored a free-kick brace while Mohammed Rafique and Rahul Bheke scored the other two as the Red and Gold brigade matched their own record which they set back on 23 May 1936, when they defeated the Green and Maroons by the similar 4–0 scoreline with goals from Laxminarayan, K. Prasad, Murgesh and Majid.

On 29 January 2022, in an ISL derby Mohun Bagan beat East Bengal 3–1 scores with a hat-trick from Kiyan Nassiri, son of former East Bengal player Jamshid Nassiri, and became the youngest player to score a hat-trick in the derby. East Bengal lost six consecutive derbies since 2019.

On 25 February 2023, Mohun Bagan made the record of winning back to back eight consecutive derbies— one in the Durand Cup, one in the I-League and six in the ISL (From 19 January 2020).

The derby of 2025–26 Indian Super League on 17 May 2026 became the most consequential derby in the history of the first tier league due to the direct title implications it carried in the season. The match ended in a 1—1 draw with both goals scored within the last five minutes.

=== First official derby ===
Calcutta Football League
28 May 1925
12:00 IST (UTC+05:30)

East Bengal	1–0	Mohun Bagan
Nepal Chakravarty	Report

Calcutta Ground (now Mohun Bagan Ground), Calcutta
Referee: C. R. Clayton

GK	(India) Purna Das
DF	(India) Prafulla Chatterjee
DF	(India) Santosh Ganguly
MF	(India) Bijay Hari Sen
MF	(India) Haran Saha
MF	(India) Nani Gosai
ST	(India) Surya Chakravarty
ST	(India) Hemanga Bose
ST	(India) Mona Dutta
ST	(India) Nepal Chakravarty
ST	(India) Mana Mallick
Captain	Mona Dutta

GK	(India) Nripen Bhaduri
DF	(India) Gostha Pal
DF	(India) R.Das
MF	(India) Tarak Sur
MF	(India) Balai Chatterjee
MF	(India) Sudhangshu Bose
ST	(India) M. Ghosh
ST	(India) Rabi Ganguly
ST	(India) Poltu Das Gupta
ST	(India) Umapati Kumar
ST	(India) Khetra Bose
Captain	Gostha Pal

== Statistics ==
=== Trophy counts ===
Major and Minor Honours (International, National and State)

This following table includes only those titles recognised and organised by the AFC, AFF, AIFF, ANFA, IFA, SFA, WIFA, DSA and other associations:

Type	Association	Competition	Mohun Bagan	East Bengal	Ref.
International	AFF	ASEAN Club Championship	0	1	
International	AFC	Central Asia Champions' Cup	0	1	
International	ANFA	Wai Wai Cup	0	1	
International	ANFA	San Miguel International Cup	0	1	
International	Total		0	4	
National	AIFF	NFL/I-League/Indian Super League	7	4	
National	AIFF	ISL Cup	2	0	
National	AIFF	Federation Cup/Super Cup	14	9	
National	AIFF	Durand Cup	17	17	
National	AIFF	Indian Super Cup	2	3	
National	Total		42	33	
Domestic (Major)	WIFA	Rovers Cup	14	10	
Domestic (Major)	IFA	IFA Shield	22	29	
Domestic (Major)	IFA	Calcutta Football League	31	41	
Domestic (Major)	IFA	Trades Cup	11	4	
Domestic (Major)	IFA	Cooch Behar Cup	18	5	
Domestic (Major)	Total		96	89	
Domestic (Minor)	SFA	Sikkim Gold Cup	10	0	
Domestic (Minor)	DGHSA	Darjeeling Gold Cup	3	5	
Domestic (Minor)	DSA	DCM Trophy	1	7	
Domestic (Minor)	GSA	Bordoloi Trophy	7	5	
Domestic (Minor)	IFA	All Airlines Gold Cup	8	7	
Domestic (Minor)	IFA	Lakshmibilas Cup	7	3	
Domestic (Minor)	IFA	Raja Memorial Shield	5	1	
Domestic (Minor)	IFA	Lady Hardinge Shield	6	1	
Domestic (Minor)	IFA	Gladstone Cup	4	1	
Domestic (Minor)	IFA	Griffith Shield	4	2	
Domestic (Minor)	IFA	McDowell's Cup	1	3	
Domestic (Minor)	IFA	William Younger Cup	3	2	
Domestic (Minor)	Total		59	37	
Cumulative Total			197	163	

=== Kolkata Derby matches ===
As of matches played on 8 October 2026

Overall Kolkata Derby head-to-head record
Competition	Matches played	East Bengal wins	Mohun Bagan wins	Draws
National Football League / I-League / Indian Super League (Note: Consists of both league winners shield and champions trophy.)	56	17	24	15
Federation Cup / Super Cup	24	9	6	9
Calcutta Football League (Note: Includes 8 Walkover Matches.)	166	58	47	61
IFA Shield (Note: Includes 1 Walkover Match.)	43	21	9	13
Durand Cup	25	11	9	5
Rovers Cup	12	4	4	4
All Airlines Gold Cup	10	7	1	2
Delhi Cloth Mills Trophy	1	1	0	0
Scissors Cup	2	0	2	0
McDowell Cup	2	1	1	0
Bordoloi Trophy	1	0	1	0
Darjeeling Gold Cup	3	1	0	2
Horendra Mukherjee Memorial Shield	2	1	0	1
Amrita Bazar Centenary Cup	1	0	1	0
Peerless Trophy	1	0	1	0
Mohun Bagan Centenary Cup	1	0	0	1
Nehru Centenary Cup	1	1	0	0
J. C. Guha Trophy	1	0	0	1
Shibdas Bhaduri Memorial Trophy	1	0	1	0
SSS Trophy	1	0	0	1
PNB Centenary Trophy	1	0	1	0
Kalinga Cup	1	1	0	0
Md. Sporting Platinum Jubilee Cup	1	1	0	0
Cooch Behar Cup	10	2	4	4
Khogendra Shield	1	1	0	0
Raja Memorial Shield	1	0	1	0
Gladstone Cup	1	0	1	0
Darbhanga Shield	3	0	3	0
William Younger Challenge Cup	3	0	2	1
Lady Hardinge Shield	5	1	4	0
Trades Cup	2	0	1	1
Chandicharan Shield	2	1	1	0
Competitive Matches Total (including walkovers)	385	139	125	121
Exhibition Games	27	6	11	10
All Time Total	412	145	136	131

East Bengal has 6 W/O wins over Mohun Bagan and Mohun Bagan has 3 W/O wins over East Bengal.

==== Recent match results ====
The records of the meetings between the sides since 2009 have been listed below.

Date	Home team	Result	Away team	Stadium	Competition
29 November 2026	Mohun Bagan		East Bengal	Vivekananda Yuva Bharati Krirangan	ISL
8 October 2026	Mohun Bagan	1 – 0	East Bengal	Vivekananda Yuva Bharati Krirangan	IFA Shield
7 September 2026	East Bengal	1–1	Mohun Bagan	Barasat Stadium	Calcutta Football League
23 August 2026	East Bengal	4–1	Mohun Bagan	Vivekananda Yuva Bharati Krirangan	Durand Cup
25 July 2026	Mohun Bagan	1–0	East Bengal	Vivekananda Yuva Bharati Krirangan	Durand Cup
17 May 2026	Mohun Bagan	1–1	East Bengal	Vivekananda Yuva Bharati Krirangan	ISL
31 October 2025	Mohun Bagan	0–0	East Bengal	Fatorda Stadium	Super Cup
18 October 2025	East Bengal	1–1; 4–5 (p)	Mohun Bagan	Vivekananda Yuva Bharati Krirangan	IFA Shield
17 August 2025	East Bengal	2–1	Mohun Bagan	Vivekananda Yuva Bharati Krirangan	Durand Cup
26 July 2025	East Bengal	3–2	Mohun Bagan	Kalyani Stadium	CFL
11 January 2025	Mohun Bagan	1–0	East Bengal	Vivekananda Yuva Bharati Krirangan	ISL
19 October 2024	East Bengal	0–2	Mohun Bagan	Vivekananda Yuva Bharati Krirangan	ISL
2 September 2024	Mohun Bagan	1–1; 3–2 (p)	East Bengal	K. D. Singh Babu Stadium	Exhibition match
18 August 2024	Mohun Bagan	– (Note: The match was cancelled due to security reasons.)	East Bengal	Vivekananda Yuva Bharati Krirangan	Durand Cup
13 July 2024	Mohun Bagan	1–2	East Bengal	Vivekananda Yuva Bharati Krirangan	CFL
10 March 2024	East Bengal	1–3	Mohun Bagan	Vivekananda Yuva Bharati Krirangan	ISL
3 February 2024	Mohun Bagan	2–2	East Bengal	Vivekananda Yuva Bharati Krirangan	ISL
19 January 2024	Mohun Bagan	1–3	East Bengal	Kalinga Stadium	Super Cup
30 November 2023	East Bengal	3–0 (Note: Match was turned into a walkover win for East Bengal after Bagan decided not to field a team, and hence East Bengal was awarded 3 goals and walkover victory.)	Mohun Bagan	Bankimanjali Stadium	CFL
3 September 2023	East Bengal	0–1	Mohun Bagan	Vivekananda Yuva Bharati Krirangan	Durand Cup
12 August 2023	Mohun Bagan	0–1	East Bengal	Vivekananda Yuva Bharati Krirangan	Durand Cup
25 February 2023	East Bengal	0–2	Mohun Bagan	Vivekananda Yuva Bharati Krirangan	ISL
29 October 2022	Mohun Bagan	2–0	East Bengal	Vivekananda Yuva Bharati Krirangan	ISL
28 August 2022	East Bengal	0–1	Mohun Bagan	Vivekananda Yuba Bharati Krirangan	Durand Cup
29 January 2022	Mohun Bagan	3–1	East Bengal	Fatorda Stadium	ISL
27 November 2021	East Bengal	0–3	Mohun Bagan	Tilak Maidan	ISL
19 February 2021	Mohun Bagan	3–1	East Bengal	Fatorda Stadium	ISL
27 November 2020	East Bengal	0–2	Mohun Bagan	Tilak Maidan	ISL
15 March 2020	East Bengal	– (Note: Match was cancelled due to the spread of COVID-19 in India.)	Mohun Bagan	Vivekananda Yuba Bharati Krirangan	I-League
19 January 2020	Mohun Bagan	2–1	East Bengal	Vivekananda Yuba Bharati Krirangan	I-League
1 September 2019	Mohun Bagan	0–0	East Bengal	Vivekananda Yuba Bharati Krirangan	CFL
27 January 2019	Mohun Bagan	0–2	East Bengal	Vivekananda Yuba Bharati Krirangan	I-League
16 December 2018	East Bengal	3–2	Mohun Bagan	Vivekananda Yuba Bharati Krirangan	I-League
2 September 2018	East Bengal	2–2	Mohun Bagan	Vivekananda Yuba Bharati Krirangan	CFL
21 January 2018	East Bengal	0–2	Mohun Bagan	Vivekananda Yuba Bharati Krirangan	I-League
3 December 2017	Mohun Bagan	1–0	East Bengal	Vivekananda Yuba Bharati Krirangan	I-League
24 September 2017	East Bengal	2–2	Mohun Bagan	Kanchenjunga Stadium	CFL
14 May 2017	Mohun Bagan	2–0	East Bengal	Barabati Stadium	Federation Cup
9 April 2017	Mohun Bagan	2–1	East Bengal	Kanchenjunga Stadium	I-League
12 February 2017	East Bengal	0–0	Mohun Bagan	Kanchenjunga Stadium	I-League
7 September 2016	East Bengal	3–0 (Note: Match was turned into a walkover win for East Bengal after Bagan decided not to field a team for this game as they claimed their team should've got some time to practice on the pitch which they weren't allowed to, and hence East Bengal was awarded 3 goals and walkover victory.)	Mohun Bagan	Kalyani Stadium	CFL
2 April 2016	East Bengal	2–1	Mohun Bagan	Kanchenjunga Stadium	I-League
23 January 2016	Mohun Bagan	1–1	East Bengal	Kanchenjunga Stadium	I-League
6 September 2015	East Bengal	4–0	Mohun Bagan	Vivekananda Yuba Bharati Krirangan	CFL
28 March 2015	Mohun Bagan	1–0	East Bengal	Vivekananda Yuba Bharati Krirangan	I-League
17 February 2015	East Bengal	1–1	Mohun Bagan	Vivekananda Yuba Bharati Krirangan	I-League
31 August 2014	East Bengal	3–1	Mohun Bagan	Vivekananda Yuba Bharati Krirangan	CFL
1 March 2014	East Bengal	1–1	Mohun Bagan	Vivekananda Yuba Bharati Krirangan	I-League
11 January 2014	East Bengal	0–1	Mohun Bagan	Vivekananda Yuba Bharati Krirangan	CFL
24 November 2013	East Bengal	1–0	Mohun Bagan	Vivekananda Yuba Bharati Krirangan	I-League
23 May 2013	East Bengal	3–2	Mohun Bagan	Vivekananda Yuba Bharati Krirangan	CFL
17 March 2013	East Bengal	1–1; 4–2 (p)	Mohun Bagan	Vivekananda Yuba Bharati Krirangan	IFA Shield
9 February 2013	Mohun Bagan	0–0	East Bengal	Vivekananda Yuba Bharati Krirangan	I-League
9 December 2012	East Bengal	3–0 (Note: Match was turned into a walkover win for East Bengal after Bagan decided to forfeit the match at half time.)	Mohun Bagan	Vivekananda Yuba Bharati Krirangan	I-League
4 February 2012	East Bengal	1–1	Mohun Bagan	Vivekananda Yuba Bharati Krirangan	I-League
7 January 2012	Mohun Bagan	2–0	East Bengal	Vivekananda Yuba Bharati Krirangan	CFL
20 November 2011	Mohun Bagan	1–0	East Bengal	Vivekananda Yuba Bharati Krirangan	I-League
9 April 2011	East Bengal	2–1	Mohun Bagan	Vivekananda Yuba Bharati Krirangan	I-League
6 February 2011	Mohun Bagan	1–1	East Bengal	Vivekananda Yuba Bharati Krirangan	I-League
26 November 2010	Mohun Bagan	0–2	East Bengal	Vivekananda Yuba Bharati Krirangan	CFL
14 November 2010	Mohun Bagan	3–3; 2–3 (p)	East Bengal	Vivekananda Yuba Bharati Krirangan	MDS Platinum Jubilee Cup
2 October 2010	East Bengal	1–0	Mohun Bagan	Barabati Stadium	Federation Cup
16 May 2010	Mohun Bagan	2–1	East Bengal	Vivekananda Yuba Bharati Krirangan	I-League
24 April 2010	Mohun Bagan	0–0	East Bengal	Vivekananda Yuba Bharati Krirangan	CFL
31 December 2009	East Bengal	2–0	Mohun Bagan	Nehru Stadium	Federation Cup
25 October 2009	Mohun Bagan	5–3	East Bengal	Vivekananda Yuba Bharati Krirangan	I-League
22 February 2009	East Bengal	3–0	Mohun Bagan	Vivekananda Yuba Bharati Krirangan	I-League

Last updated: 2 September 2024
Source: soccerway.com

- Since 2009, 53 matches have been played between the teams (including exhibition matches) where:
1. Mohun Bagan won: 22 (including exhibition match from 2024.)
2. East Bengal won: 20 (including walkovers from 2016 and 2023 CFL and 2012 I-League.)
3. 12 matches ended as draws.
- Highest scorer in a single match — Chidi Edeh (Mohun Bagan), scored 4 goals in 2009.

=== Head-to-head ranking in National Football League/I-League/Indian Super League ===
1996–97 to 2026–27

R/S	National Football League											I-League													Indian Super League						
R/S	1 (Note: Mohun Bagan did not qualify in the first season, but was given entry in the next season by then AIFF president Priya Ranjan Dashmunshi.)	2 (Note: Only Championship Stage matches taken into account.)	3 (Note: Only Championship Stage matches taken into account.)	4	5	6	7	8	9	10	11	12	13	14	15	16	17	18	19	20	21	22	23	24	25	26	27	28	29	30	31
1		1		1	1	1	1	1											1					1				1	1	1	
2		2	2		2					2			2		2	2		2		2	2		2	2	2					2	
3	3								3	3							3			3	3	3				3	3				
4			4									4				4			4			4									
5						5					5			5									5								
6												6	6		6																
7				7			7																								
8									8		8							8													
9								9						9											9		9	9	9		
10																	10														
11																										11					
12																															
13																															
14																															

Last updated: 23 February 2025
Source: soccerway.com

Note: Red & Gold refers to East Bengal, while Green & Maroon refers to Mohun Bagan.

== See also ==
- List of association football club rivalries in Asia and Oceania
- List of association football rivalries
