= 2010 Indian Federation Cup =

32nd edition of the Federation Cup

2010 Federation Cup
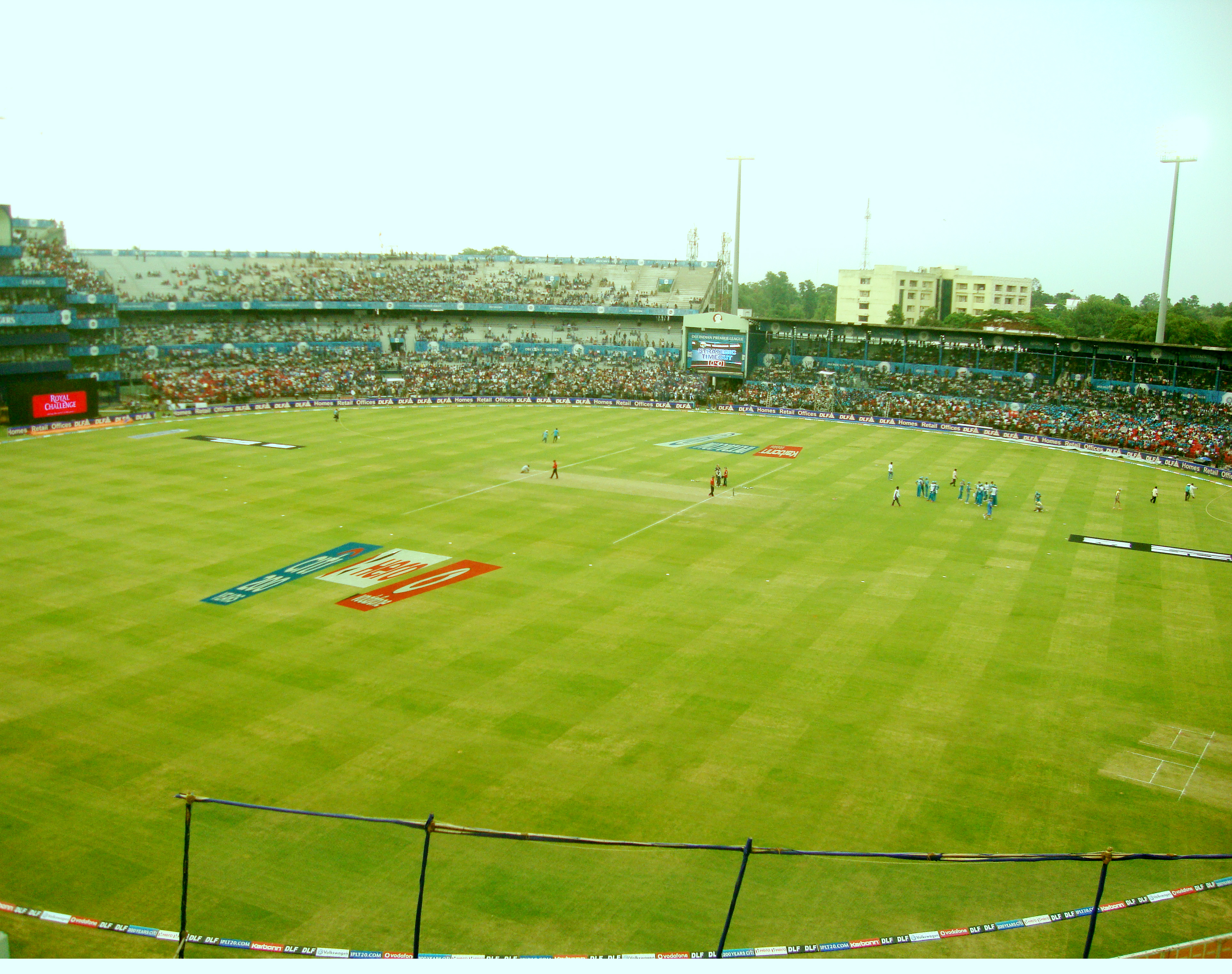
- Barabati Stadium hosted the final on 2 October 2010

Tournament details
- Country: India
- Dates: 14 – 18 September (qualification rounds); 21 September – 2 October (main competition)
- Teams: 22 (total); 16 (main competition)

Final positions
- Champions: East Bengal (7th title)
- Runners-up: Mohun Bagan
- AFC Cup: East Bengal

Tournament statistics
- Matches played: 33
- Top goal scorer(s): Ranti Martins; Muritala Ali

The 2010 Federation Cup was the 32nd season of the Indian Federation Cup. The qualifiers commenced from 14 September. Eight teams battled it out for a place in the quarterfinal round and had been divided into two groups.

The cup winner were guaranteed a place in the 2011 AFC Cup.

== Qualifying play-offs ==
The winner from each Zone qualified for the quarterfinal round which were held from 21 September.

Team 1	Score	Team 2
Zone A Round 1
Mohammedan SC	1–3	Oil India
NISA	0–3	Shillong Lajong FC
Final Play-off
Oil India	2–4	Shillong Lajong FC
Zone B Round 1
Vasco SC	0–1	SESA
Sporting Clube de Goa	6–0	Malabar United
Final Play-off
SESA	2–2(aet) (5–4 p)	Sporting Clube de Goa

== Quarter-final league ==
The two qualifiers from the preliminary knock-out round joined the 14 I-League teams, who had been divided into four groups.

=== Group A ===
Team	Pld	W	D	L	GF	GA	GD	Pts
East Bengal	3	3	0	0	6	2	+4	9
HAL SC	3	1	1	1	2	2	0	4
Pune	3	1	0	2	2	2	0	3
Air India	3	0	1	2	1	5	−4	1

=== Group B ===
Team	Pld	W	D	L	GF	GA	GD	Pts
Churchill Brothers SC	3	1	2	0	5	1	+4	5
Chirag United SC	3	1	2	0	3	2	+1	5
SESA	3	0	2	1	1	2	−1	2
Viva Kerala	3	0	2	1	2	6	−4	2

=== Group C ===
Team	Pld	W	D	L	GF	GA	GD	Pts
Dempo SC	3	2	1	0	7	2	+5	7
ONGC FC	3	2	0	1	6	7	−1	6
AIFF XI	3	1	0	2	1	3	−2	3
JCT FC	3	0	1	2	1	3	−2	1

=== Group D ===
Team	Pld	W	D	L	GF	GA	GD	Pts
Mohun Bagan AC	3	2	1	0	7	1	+6	7
Salgaocar SC	3	1	1	1	5	8	−3	4
Shillong Lajong FC	3	0	2	1	2	3	−1	2
Mumbai FC	3	0	2	1	0	2	−2	2

== Semi-finals ==
Team 1	Score	Team 2
Semi-final 1
East Bengal	1–0	Churchill Brothers SC
Semi-final 2
Dempo SC	1–1(aet) (3–5 p)	Mohun Bagan AC

== Final ==
Team 1	Score	Team 2
The Final
East Bengal	1–0	Mohun Bagan

== Top scorers ==
Top scorers as of 29 September 2010.

5 goals

- (Nigeria) Ranti Martins
- (Nigeria) Muritala Ali

4 goals

- (Australia) Tolgay Ozbey

3 goals

- (Brazil) Jose Ramirez Barreto

2 goals

- (Nigeria) Odafe Onyeka Okolie
- (India) C.S.Sabeeth
- (India) Kailash Patil
- (India) F.Lalmuanpuia
- (Nigeria) Abdula Hamza
- (Brazil) Josimar da Silva Martins

1 goal

- (India) Joaquim Abranches
- (India) Malsawmfela
- (India) Aibor Khongjee
- (India) Robin Singh(footballer)
- (India) Denson Devdas
- (Nigeria) Chidi Edeh
- (India) Paresh Shivalkar
- (India) Reisang Pemme
- (India) Peter Carvalho
- (India) P.M.Lalhlimthara
- (India) Boithang Haokip
- (India) Jeje Lalpekhlua
- (Japan) Ryuji Sueoka
- (Brazil) Luciano Sabrosa
- (India) Ajay Singh
- (India) Reisangmei Vashum

== See also ==
- 2010–11 I-League
