= 2011 IFA Shield =

২০১১ আইএফএ শিল্ড

Tournament details
- Country: India
- Teams: 10

Final positions
- Champions: Churchill Brothers (2nd title)
- Runners-up: Mohun Bagan

Tournament statistics
- Matches played: 24
- Goals scored: 53 (2.21 per match)

The 2011 IFA shield was held in Kolkata starting from 11 March, with a total of 10 teams including a Chinese super league team participating. Teams were divided into 2 groups and played each other with the top 2 advancing to the semifinals. This was the 115th edition of the tournament.

== Participating teams ==
Group A: East Bengal, Mohammedan SC, Southern Samity, Churchill Brothers SC, Shandong Luneng.

Group B: Mohun Bagan, Chirag United, Aryan FC, Shillong Lajong FC, Pune FC.

== Venue ==
Kolkata
Yuva Bharati Krirangan
Capacity: 120,000
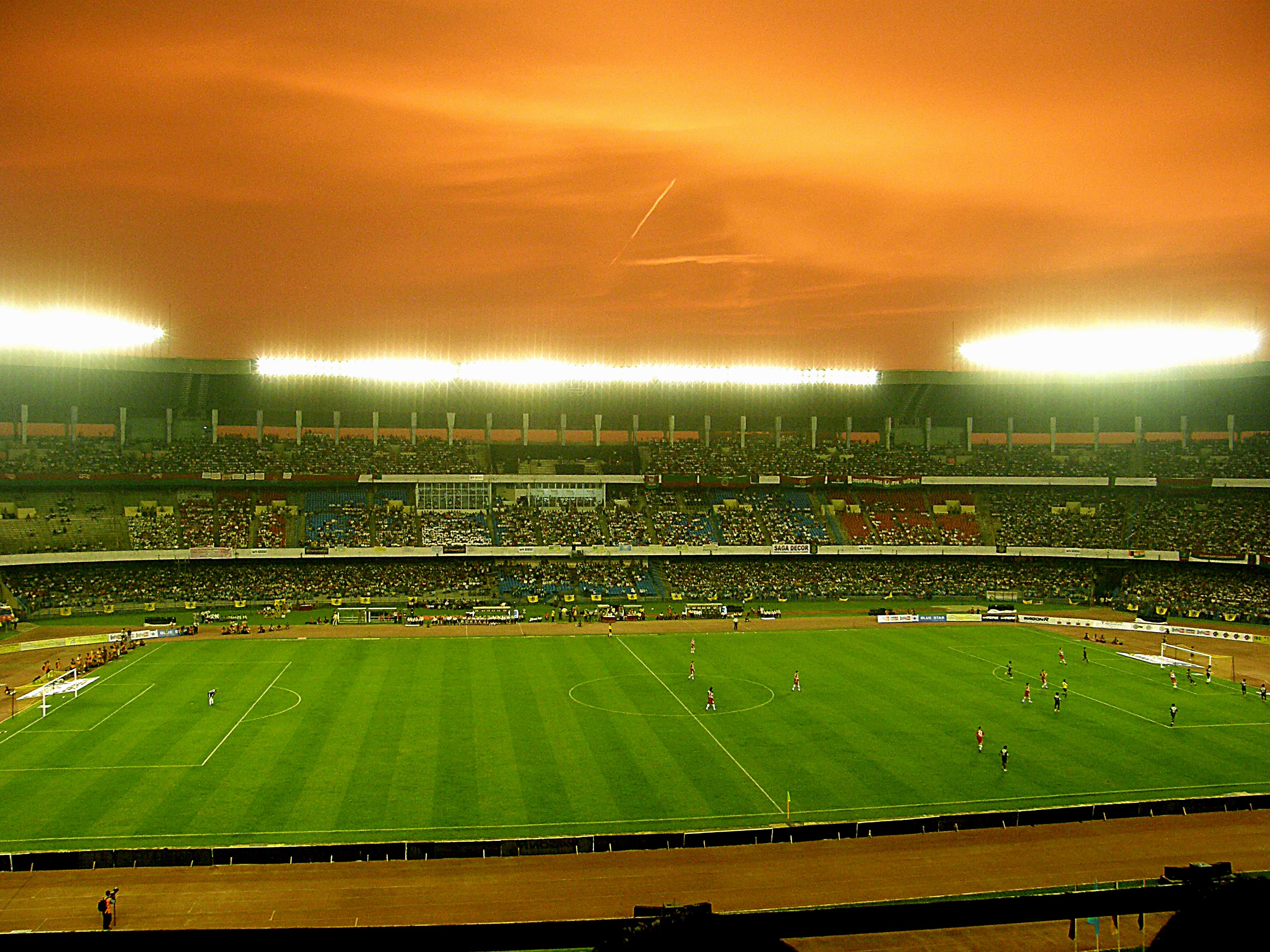

2011 IFA Shield Group A
| Team | Pld | W | D | L | GF | GA | GD | Pts |
|---|---|---|---|---|---|---|---|---|
| Churchill Brothers | 4 | 3 | 0 | 1 | 5 | 3 | +2 | 9 |
| Southern Samity | 4 | 2 | 1 | 1 | 4 | 3 | +1 | 7 |
| Mohammedan SC | 4 | 1 | 2 | 1 | 4 | 5 | −1 | 5 |
| East Bengal | 4 | 1 | 1 | 2 | 5 | 5 | 0 | 4 |
| Shandong Luneng | 4 | 1 | 0 | 3 | 3 | 5 | −2 | 3 |

East Bengal 3 – 1 Shandong Luneng (Yuva Bharati Krirangan)

East Bengal 1 – 2 Southern Samity (Yuva Bharati Krirangan)

Shandong Luneng 0 – 1 Southern Samity (Yuva Bharati Krirangan)

Mohammedan SC 1 – 3 Churchill Brothers (Yuva Bharati Krirangan)

Mohammedan SC 1 – 0 Shandong Luneng (Yuva Bharati Krirangan)

East Bengal 1 – 1 Mohammedan SC (Yuva Bharati Krirangan)

Churchill Brothers 0 – 2 Shandong Luneng (Yuva Bharati Krirangan)

Mohammedan SC 1 – 1 Southern Samity(Yuva Bharati Krirangan)

East Bengal 0 – 1 Churchill Brothers (Yuva Bharati Krirangan)

Churchill Brothers 1 – 0 Southern Samity (Yuva Bharati Krirangan)

2011 IFA Shield Group B
| Team | Pld | W | D | L | GF | GA | GD | Pts |
|---|---|---|---|---|---|---|---|---|
| Mohun Bagan | 4 | 2 | 2 | 0 | 5 | 2 | +3 | 8 |
| Shillong Lajong FC | 4 | 2 | 2 | 0 | 6 | 4 | +2 | 8 |
| Pune FC | 4 | 2 | 0 | 2 | 3 | 4 | −1 | 6 |
| Chirag United | 4 | 1 | 1 | 2 | 5 | 4 | +1 | 4 |
| Aryan Club | 4 | 0 | 1 | 3 | 1 | 6 | −5 | 1 |

Aryan Club 1 – 1 Shillong Lajong FC (Yuva Bharati Krirangan)

Mohun Bagan 1 – 1 Shillong Lajong FC (Yuva Bharati Krirangan)

Chirag United 0 – 1 Pune FC (Yuva Bharati Krirangan)

Mohun Bagan 1 – 0 Aryan Club (Yuva Bharati Krirangan)

Chirag United 1 – 2 Shillong Lajong FC (Yuva Bharati Krirangan)

Chirag United 3 – 0 Aryan (Yuva Bharati Krirangan)

Mohun Bagan 2 – 0 Pune FC(Yuva Bharati Krirangan)

Aryan Club 0 – 1 Pune FC (Yuva Bharati Krirangan)

Mohun Bagan 1 – 1 Chirag United (Yuva Bharati Krirangan)

Pune FC 1 – 2 Shillong Lajong FC (Yuva Bharati Krirangan)

=== Semi-final ===
28 March 2011 :: Mohun Bagan 2 -1 Southern Samity (YBK – 14.00 IST)

28 March 2011 ::Churchill Brothers 2 – 0 Shillong Lajong FC(YBK – 16.30 IST)

=== 3rd-place game ===
31 March 2011 :: Southern Samity 4 – 0 Shillong Lajong FC(YBK – 14.00 IST)

=== Final ===
31 March 2011 :: Mohun Bagan 1 – 2 Churchill Brothers (YBK – 16.30 IST)

== Goal scorers ==
- 3 goals
  - Racy
- 2 goals
  - Edmílson
  - Ashim Biswas
  - Mi Haolun
- 1 goal
  - Thoiba Singh
  - Ravinder Singh
  - Subhash Singh
  - Swoumi PT
  - Christopher
  - Cheng Yuan
