= Velito Cruz =

Indian professional footballer

Personal information
- Date of birth: 5 January 1991 (age 35)
- Place of birth: Goa, India
- Position: Midfielder

Team information
- Current team: Sporting Clube de Goa
- Number: 26

Youth career
- SESA

Senior career*
Years	Team	Apps	(Gls)
2013–2015	Sporting Goa	16	(0)
2015–	Dempo	0	(0)
- * Club domestic league appearances and goals as of 19 November 2015

Velito Cruz (born 5 January 1991) is an Indian professional footballer who plays as a midfielder for Dempo in the I-League 2nd Division.

== Career ==
=== Sporting Goa ===
Cruz made his professional debut for Sporting Goa in the I-League on 2 November 2013 against Pune at the Duler Stadium in which he came on as a substitute for Victorino Fernandes in the 78th minute; as Sporting Goa won the match 2–0.

== Career statistics ==
As of 28 April 2014

Club	Season	League			Federation Cup		Durand Cup		AFC		Total	
Club	Season	Apps	Goals	Apps	Goals	Apps	Goals	Apps	Goals	Apps	Goals	
Sporting Goa	2013–14	10	0	0	0	0	0	-	-	10	0	
Sporting Goa	2014–15	6	0	0	0	0	0	–	–	6	0	
Career total			16	0	0	0	0	0	0	0	16	0
