= Nicholas Rodrigues =

Indian footballer

Personal information
- Date of birth: 9 September 1982 (age 44)
- Place of birth: Goa, India
- Height: 1.73 m (5 ft 8 in)
- Position: Midfielder

Team information
- Current team: Mumbai
- Number: 7

Senior career*
Years	Team	Apps	(Gls)
- Sporting Goa
- Salgaocar
- Churchill Brothers
2010–	Mumbai		
- * Club domestic league appearances and goals

Nicholas Rodrigues (born 9 September 1982) is an Indian footballer who currently plays for Mumbai F.C. in the I-League. He most notably won the NFL Player of the Year award in 2005–06.
