= Ekene Ikenwa =

Nigerian footballer

Personal information
- Full name: Ekene Michael Ikenwa
- Date of birth: 14 September 1980 (age 46)
- Place of birth: Lagos, Nigeria
- Height: 1.83 m (6 ft 0 in)
- Position: Forward

Senior career*
Years	Team	Apps	(Gls)
2002	Clementi Khalsa FC	4	(3)
2003	Jasper United	15	(0)
2003–2004	Enugu Rangers		(?)
2003–2004	Pelita Jaya	18	(8)
2004–2005	Persik Kediri	17	(8)
2005–2007	Persib Bandung	26	(13)
2007–2008	Persekabpas Pasuruan	20	(7)
2008–2009	Kuala Muda Naza FC	21	(5)
2009–2010	Salgaocar SC	24	(17)
2010	→ Preah Khan Reach (loan)	12	(11)
2010	East Bengal Club	0	(0)
2010–2011	Salgaocar SC	15	(5)
2013–2014	PSBK Blitar	23	(6)
- * Club domestic league appearances and goals

Ekene Michael Ikenwa (born 14 September 1977 in Lagos) is a Nigerian former professional footballer who last played for PSBK Blitar in the Liga Indonesia Premier Division. Ekene played as a forward.
