= Okwy Diamondstar =

Australian association football player

Personal information
- Full name: Okwy Diamondstar
- Date of birth: 20 January 1986 (age 40)
- Place of birth: Australia
- Position: Defender

Senior career*
Years	Team	Apps	(Gls)
- Blood Mouth Club
2006	Floreat Athena		
2007	Stirling Lions		
2007	Persis Solo		
2009	Western Knights		(1)
2010	Bayswater City		(2)
2010–2011	Mohun Bagan		
2012–2014	Ashfield	3	(0)
- * Club domestic league appearances and goals as of 10 September 2023

Okwy Diamondstar (born 20 January 1986) is an Australian retired footballer who played as a defender and last played for Ashfield.

== Club career ==
=== Indonesia ===
Recommended to Persis Solo prior to the 2007–08 Liga Indonesia Premier Division, Diamondstar eventually put pen to paper on the deal.

=== India ===
Called to test for Mohun Bagan partway through August 2010, he was listed prior to the Mariners matchup with Chirag United, debuting as they fell 1–0.

Claiming that Mohun Bagan owed him a part of his salary and medical expenses, he lodged a complaint to the AIFF and FIFA but it was dismissed by a city court, alleviating Mohun's pressure to pay.
