= Snehasish Chakraborty =

Indian football player (born 1989)

Personal information
- Full name: Snehasish Chakraborty
- Date of birth: 16 February 1989 (age 37)
- Place of birth: Shyamnagar, West Bengal, India
- Height: 1.84 m (6 ft 1/2 in)
- Position: Midfielder

Team information
- Current team: Prayag United S.C.

Youth career
- 2004–05: Eveready
- 2005–07: East Bengal

Senior career*
Years	Team	Apps	(Gls)
2007–09	Chirag United		
2009–2013	Mohun Bagan	23	(0)
2013–2014	United	7	(0)
2014–2015	Pune FC		
2015	Southern Samity		
- * Club domestic league appearances and goals

Snehasish Chakraborty (Bengali: স্নেহাশিস চক্রবর্তী; born 16 February 1989) is an Indian football player. He most notably played for Prayag United in the I-League as a midfielder.

== Career ==
=== Early career ===
While living in Icchapur, he used to attend a coaching camp. In Shyamnagar, he used to practice under Jahar Biswas who used to come all the way from Naihati. When he was in Class 7, he played in Sodepur Nursery League along with players like Lalkamal Bhowmick who is his childhood buddy.

In the year 2004–05, he moved to Eveready where he played under the coaching of Aloke Mukherjee. After staying 1 year in Eveready, he played 2 years for East Bengal F.C. before changing over to Chirag United.

=== Mohun Bagan ===
Chakraborty started his football career with Mohun Bagan in 2009–10. In his first season, he played eight games and scored one goal. He spent four seasons with them.

=== Prayag United ===
For the 2013–14 season he signed for Prayag United S.C. He made his debut in the I-League on 6 October 2013 against Bengaluru FC at the Bangalore Football Stadium in which he came on as a substitute for Shouvik Chakraborty in 61st minute as Prayag United lost the match 1–0.

== International ==
Chakraborty was first selected for the India U23 team in June 2011 for the 2012 Olympics qualifiers against Qatar U-23 but he did not feature in each of the two matches for India.
