= Muritala Ali =

Nigerian footballer

Personal information
- Full name: Subair Muritala Ali
- Date of birth: 1 February 1984 (age 42)
- Height: 1.85 m (6 ft 1 in)
- Position: Forward

Senior career*
Years	Team	Apps	(Gls)
2004–2005	Air India		
2005–2006	Sporting Goa		
2006–2007	Kuala Lumpur City		
2007–2008	Mohammedan		
2008–2009	Chirag United		
2009–2010	Mahindra United		
2010–2011	Mohun Bagan AC		
2011–2013	ONGC F.C.		
2013–2014	Al-Suqoor Club	16	(12)
2014–2018	Spartan FC	10	(8)
- * Club domestic league appearances and goals

Subair Muritala Ali (born 1 February 1984) is a Nigerian football player. Muritala earlier played for Mahindra United and Chirag United.
