= Reisangmei Vashum =

Indian footballer

Personal information
- Date of birth: 10 January 1988 (age 38)
- Place of birth: Manipur, India
- Position: Midfielder

Team information
- Current team: Yarkhok United

Youth career
- HAL

Senior career*
Years	Team	Apps	(Gls)
2008–2010	Churchill Brothers		(6)
2010–2014	East Bengal	32	(3)
2014–2015	Mumbai FC	11	(1)
2015–2016	Tollygunge Agragami		
2016–2017	Mohammedan		
2018–2019	TRAU		
2019–	Yarkhok United		

International career
2012	India	3	(0)
- * Club domestic league appearances and goals as of 2 March 2018

Reisangmei Vashum (born 10 January 1988 in Manipur) is an Indian professional footballer who plays as a midfielder for TRAU in I-League 2nd Division. He represented India in 2012, earning three caps.

== Career ==
=== Early career ===
Vashum first played for Hindustan Aeronautics Limited of Bangalore in his youth career before signing for Churchill Brothers of the I-League in 2008. Vashum scored his first goal for Churchill Brothers in the I-League on 15 November 2008 against Mumbai F.C. in the 70th minute in a match that Churchill drew 2–2. He then scored his second goal for Churchill Brothers on 20 February 2009 against Vasco S.C. in the 77th minute in a match that Churchill Brothers won 9–1. Vashum then scored again for Churchill Brothers on 6 October 2009 against Viva Kerala in which he scored in the 5th minute for the club as Churchill Brothers won 2–0. Vashum then continued his scoring run in the next round against Mumbai F.C. on 16 October 2009 in which he scored in the 20th minute in a match that Churchill drew 1–1. Vashum then went on to score the equalizer for Churchill Brothers in the next match against JCT Mills on 23 October 2009 in which he scored in the 84th minute to help Churchill salvage a 1–1 draw. Vashum did not score again for Churchill Brothers till 22 January 2010 in which he scored in the 14th minute for Churchill Brothers against East Bengal F.C. at the Salt Lake Stadium in a match that Churchill Brothers lost 3–2.

=== East Bengal ===
Vashum signed for East Bengal F.C. in 2010 and he scored his first goal for East Bengal on 26 February 2011 against Indian Arrows in which he scored in the 19th minute in a match that East Bengal drew 1–1.

=== Mumbai ===
In December 2014, Vashum signed for Mumbai F.C.

== Honours ==
Churchill Brothers

- IFA Shield: 2009
