= Ravinder Singh (footballer) =

Indian footballer (born 1991)

Personal information
- Full name: Ravinder Singh
- Date of birth: 17 December 1991 (age 34)
- Place of birth: India
- Height: 1.73 m (5 ft 8 in)
- Position: Leftback

Team information
- Current team: Mohun Bagan
- Number: 3

Senior career*
Years	Team	Apps	(Gls)
2008–2010	Air India		
2010–2011	East Bengal		
2012–2013	Prayag United	6	(0)
2013–present	Mohun Bagan	2	(0)

International career
2009–2010	India U23	6	(0)
- * Club domestic league appearances and goals as of 27 April 2014

Ravinder Singh (born 17 December 1991) is an Indian footballer who played as a leftback for Mohun Bagan in the I-League.

== Career ==
=== Early career ===
Singh started his career at Air India FC in 2008 where he stayed till 2010. While with Air India Singh scored four goals. He scored his first goal for the club on 26 October 2008 against Dempo in which Air India lost 3–1. Singh scored his second goal for the club one year later on 8 October 2009 against Pune at the Balewadi Sports Complex. He then scored his third goal for the club on 22 January 2010 against Salgaocar and his fourth against JCT FC on 3 February 2010.

After spending two seasons with Air India Singh then signed for East Bengal F.C. where he spent only one season at the club where he scored four goals. His first goal for the club came on 29 December 2010 against his former club Air India at the Salt Lake Stadium as East Bengal thrashed Air India 6–1. He then scored his second goal for the club on 2 March 2011 during the 2011 AFC Asian Cup against Chonburi FC in a match that ended 4–4. Singh then scored in his second match in a row against JCT FC on 9 March 2011 as East Bengal won the match 3–0. He then scored his final goal for the club on 28 May 2011 against HAL at the Bangalore Football Stadium in a match that ended 1–1.

=== Prayag United ===
After spending one full season out of the I-League Singh signed for Prayag United. He made his debut for the club on 16 December 2012 against his former club, East Bengal, at the Salt Lake Stadium in which Prayag United won 1–0.

=== Mohun Bagan ===
On 15 June 2013, Singh signed for Mohun Bagan for one year. He made his debut in the I-League on 22 October 2013 against Bengaluru FC at the Bangalore Football Stadium in which he played till 54th minutes before being replaced by Nicolau Borges as Mohun Bagan drew the match 1–1.

== Honours ==
India U23

- SAFF Championship: 2009
