= Chidi Edeh =

Nigerian footballer

Personal information
- Full name: Chidi Edeh
- Date of birth: 18 August 1987 (age 39)
- Place of birth: Lagos, Nigeria
- Height: 1.84 m (6 ft 0 in)
- Position: Forward

Senior career*
Years	Team	Apps	(Gls)
2003–2004	Mohammedan	19	(4)
2004–2006	Sporting Goa	37	(15)
2006–2007	JCT	16	(12)
2007–2008	Dempo	15	(8)
2008–2009	Mahindra United	22	(11)
2009–2011	Mohun Bagan	39	(21)
2011–2012	Salgaocar	21	(6)
2012–2014	East Bengal	48	(27)
2015	Kedah FA	26	(18)
2016	Enugu Rangers	30	(17)
2018	Penang	4	(0)
2018	Aizawl	0	(0)
- * Club domestic league appearances and goals as of 27 July 2018

Chidi Edeh (born 18 August 1987) is a Nigerian professional footballer who plays as a striker. He played most of his career for clubs in India.

== Career ==
=== Dempo ===
In 2007, Edeh signed with I-League side Dempo SC and appeared in 15 league matches. He scored 8 goals for the Goan side as Dempo clinched their maiden I-League title. With Dempo, he also played in the AFC Cup in 2008.

=== Mohun Bagan ===
In 2009–10, he was a prolific scorer for the Kolkata-based side. He became the darling of the club's fans when he scored a hat-trick (4 goals) in the I-League match to beat East Bengal 5–3.

=== East Bengal ===
In the 2012–13 I-League, he was a prolific scorer for the Kolkata-based side. In the 2013 AFC Cup, he played a major role in East Bengal's unbeaten run in Group-H. On 30 April, he scored from the spot against Sài Gòn Xuân Thành F.C. on the 8th minute, after he was brought down in the box.

In the pre-quarter final of the 2013 AFC Cup, he netted a hat-trick in the 5-1 win over Yangon United F.C., and also assisted Penn Orji to score on the 2nd minute. On 5 April 2014, Edeh became the fifth player to score 100 goals in the I-league when he scored the third goal for East Bengal against Mohammedan.

=== Kedah FA ===
In January 2015 he signed a contract with Kedah FA. He scored 14 goals and five assists in 16 appearances for Kedah FA in all competitions. He scored a hat trick against Johor Darul Ta'zim II F.C. at Stadium Darul Aman in a Malaysia Premier League match. He scored two goals for Kedah FA against LionsXII in Malaysia Cup 2015 competition.

=== Aizawl FC ===
On 7 June 2018, former I-League champions Aizawl FC announced the signing of Edeh, as they continued bolstering their squad for the next season. "Join us in welcoming The Nigerian Goal Machine - Chidi Edeh," the Aizawl-based club revealed the news through their Twitter handle.

== Honours ==
=== Club ===
Kedah

- Malaysia Premier League: 2015

Individual

- Indian Federation Cup top goalscorers: 2012
