= 2013–14 Churchill Brothers FC season =

Indian football club season

Churchill Brothers
2013–14 season
- Technical Director: Sukhwinder Singh
- Head coach: Mariano Dias
- Stadium: Fatorda Stadium, Margao
- I-League: 12th
- Federation Cup: Winner
| Home colours | Away colours |

The 2013–14 Churchill Brothers S.C. season will be the club's seventh season in the I-League, the top division of Indian football. Churchill Brothers enter this season as the reigning I-League champions after winning the 2012–13 I-League.

== I-League ==
=== Matches ===
| 21 September 2013 Match 1 | Churchill Brothers | 0 – 1 | Salgaocar | Margao |
| 17:00 | Fernandes (yellow card) 73'; Rodrigues (yellow card) 90+1' | Summary | Wali (yellow card) 36'; Duffy 41'; Colaco (yellow card) 57' | Stadium: Fatorda Stadium; Referee: (India) Pranjal Banerji |

| 28 September 2013 Match 2 | Churchill Brothers | 0 – 0 | Mohun Bagan | Mapusa |
| 17:00 | Fernandes (yellow card) 62'; Singh (yellow card) 66'; Balan (yellow card) 90' | Summary | Khongjee (yellow card) 34' | Stadium: Duler Stadium; Referee: (India) Cr Srikrishna |

| 5 October 2013 Match 3 | Churchill Brothers | 0 – 2 | Mumbai | Mapusa |
| 16:00 | Singh (yellow card) 35'; Henri Antchouet (yellow card) 48'; Singh (yellow card) 73' | Summary | Pereira (yellow card) 36'; Orok Essien 46'; Lawrence 87' | Stadium: Duler Stadium; Referee: (India) Mb Santosh Kumar |

| 10 October 2013 Match 4 | Rangdajied United | 1 – 1 | Churchill Brothers | Shillong |
| 16:00 | Lyngdoh 25' | Summary | Singh 27' | Stadium: Jawaharlal Nehru Stadium, Shillong; Referee: (India) Ph Singh |

| 19 October 2013 Match 5 | Pune | 1 – 0 | Churchill Brothers | Pune |
| 20:15 | Edathodika (yellow card) 29'; Angus 52'; Meyer (yellow card) 61'; Izumi (yellow card) 77' | Summary | Franco (yellow card) 49' | Stadium: Shree Shiv Chhatrapati Sports Complex; Referee: (India) Pranjal Banerji |

| 28 October 2013 Match 6 | Shillong Lajong F.C. | 2 – 2 | Churchill Brothers | Shillong |
| 11:00 | Singh 21' (pen.); Singh (yellow card) 32'; Uilliams 34'; Matsugae (yellow card) 38'; Singh (yellow card) 56'; Passah (yellow card) 88' | Summary | Balan 6' (yellow card) 90+2'; Hamed Adesope (yellow card) 20'; Ravanan (yellow card) 21'; Singh (yellow card) 51'; Hugo Machado 90' | Stadium: Jawaharlal Nehru Stadium, Shillong; Referee: (India) Subrata Barman |

| 2 November 2013 Match 7 | United S.C. | 3 – 2 | Churchill Brothers | Kalyani, West Bengal |
| 12:30 | Vineeth 55'; Martins 77', 88' | Summary | Singh 25', 47'; Fernandes (yellow card) 75'; Franco (red card) 89' | Stadium: Kalyani Stadium; Referee: (India) Vishnu Chauhan |

| 6 November 2013 Match 8 | Dempo | 1 – 0 | Churchill Brothers | Mapusa |
| 10:00 | Lalpekhlua 15'; Das (yellow card) 16'; Roy (yellow card) 85' | Summary | Singh (yellow card) 31'; Pereira (yellow card) 90+4' | Stadium: Duler Stadium; Referee: (India) Mb Santosh Kumar |

| 23 November 2013 Match 9 | Mohammedan | 0 – 0 | Churchill Brothers | Kolkata |
| 12:30 | Masih (yellow card) 85' | Summary | Fernandes (yellow card) 12' | Stadium: Salt Lake Stadium; Referee: (India) Coimbatore Ramaswamy Srikrishna |

| 28 November 2013 Match 10 | Churchill Brothers | 3 – 2 | Sporting Goa | Mapusa |
| 14:00 | Shabana 2'; Singh 37'; Raju (yellow card) 86'; Vales 90+5' (yellow card) 90+5' | Summary | Karpeh 5'; Martins (yellow card) 83'; Shirodkar 89' | Stadium: Duler Stadium; Referee: (India) Vishnu Chauhan |

=== Table ===
| Pos | Team | Pld | W | D | L | GF | GA | GD | Pts | Qualification or relegation |
|---|---|---|---|---|---|---|---|---|---|---|
| 9 | Mumbai | 24 | 5 | 13 | 6 | 31 | 32 | −1 | 28 | |
| 10 | United (R) | 24 | 5 | 11 | 8 | 22 | 32 | −10 | 26 | Excluded (Note: United, Rangdajied United and Churchill Brothers were barred from I-League they failed to meet Asian Football Confederation's licensing criteria.) |
| 11 | Rangdajied United (R) | 24 | 6 | 7 | 11 | 29 | 38 | −9 | 25 | Excluded |
| 12 | Churchill Brothers (R) | 24 | 6 | 7 | 11 | 25 | 37 | −12 | 25 | Excluded |
| 13 | Mohammedan (R) | 24 | 6 | 6 | 12 | 27 | 35 | −8 | 24 | Relegation to 2015 I-League 2nd Division |

Source: IndiaFooty.com
Rules for classification: 1) points; 2) head-to-head points; 3) goal difference; 4) number of goals scored; 5) taking lots
(R) Relegated

== Competitions ==
=== Federation Cup ===
==== Group stage ====
| Team | Pld | W | D | L | GF | GA | GD | Pts |
|---|---|---|---|---|---|---|---|---|
| Churchill Brothers | 3 | 3 | 0 | 0 | 7 | 4 | +3 | 9 |
| Eagles | 3 | 1 | 1 | 1 | 4 | 3 | +1 | 4 |
| United | 3 | 1 | 0 | 2 | 2 | 4 | −2 | 3 |
| Pune | 3 | 0 | 1 | 2 | 3 | 5 | −2 | 1 |

| 14 January 2014 | Churchill Brothers | 2–1 | United | Jawaharlal Nehru Stadium, Kochi |
| | Shabana 5'; Singh 17' | Report | Martins 43' |

| 17 January 2014 | Eagles | 1–2 | Churchill Brothers | Jawaharlal Nehru Stadium, Kochi |
| | Sakibo 83' | Report | Singh 74'; Shabana 86' |

| 20 January 2014 | Churchill Brothers | 3–2 | Pune | Jawaharlal Nehru Stadium, Kochi |
| | Wolfe 8', 74'; Rodrigues 24' | Report | Fernandes 19', 53' |

==== Semifinal ====
| 23 January 2014 | Churchill Brothers | 2–1 | Mohun Bagan | Jawaharlal Nehru Stadium, Kochi |
| | Singh 4'; Wolfe 14' | Report | Okolie 33' |

==== Final ====
| 25 January 2014 | Churchill Brothers | 3–1 | Sporting Goa | Jawaharlal Nehru Stadium, Kochi |
| | Singh 21'; Sawant 47'; Shabana 67' | Report | Fernandes 62' |

=== AFC Cup ===
==== Group stage ====
| Team | Pld | W | D | L | GF | GA | GD | Pts |
|---|---|---|---|---|---|---|---|---|
| (Indonesia) Persipura Jayapura | 6 | 3 | 2 | 1 | 9 | 4 | +5 | 11 |
| (India) Churchill Brothers | 6 | 3 | 1 | 2 | 10 | 7 | +3 | 10 (Note: Tiebreakers: Churchill Brothers and Home United are ranked on head-to-head record.) |
| (Singapore) Home United | 6 | 3 | 1 | 2 | 8 | 6 | +2 | 10 |
| (Maldives) New Radiant | 6 | 1 | 0 | 5 | 2 | 12 | −10 | 3 |

Notes:

| 25 February 2014 | Persipura Jayapura (Indonesia) | 2–0 | (India) Churchill Brothers | Mandala Stadium, Jayapura |
| 16:00 UTC+9 | Solossa 48'; Pahabol 62' | Report | | Attendance: 9,000; Referee: Win Cho (Myanmar) |

| 11 March 2014 | Churchill Brothers (India) | 3–0 | (Maldives) New Radiant | Fatorda Stadium, Margao |
| 17:30 UTC+5:30 | Lagos 31', 75'; Wolfe 53' | Report | | Attendance: 1,500; Referee: Mohd Nafeez Abdul Wahab (Malaysia) |

| 18 March 2014 | Churchill Brothers (India) | 3–1 | (Singapore) Home United | Fatorda Stadium, Margao |
| 17:30 UTC+5:30 | Wolfe 16'; Raju 26'; B. Singh 90+1' | Report | Qiu Li 10' | Attendance: 1,000; Referee: Adham Makhadmeh (Jordan) |

| 2 April 2014 | Home United (Singapore) | 2–1 | (India) Churchill Brothers | Jalan Besar Stadium, Singapore |
| 19:30 UTC+8 | Nawaz 25'; Daud 72' | Report | Precious 27' (o.g.) | Attendance: 1,020; Referee: Ma Ning (China PR) |

| 9 April 2014 | Churchill Brothers (India) | 1–1 | (Indonesia) Persipura Jayapura | Fatorda Stadium, Margao |
| 17:30 UTC+5:30 | B. Singh 84' | Report | Solossa 78' | Attendance: 200; Referee: Ng Kai Lam (Hong Kong) |

| 23 April 2014 | New Radiant (Maldives) | 1–2 | (India) Churchill Brothers | Galolhu National Stadium, Malé |
| 18:30 UTC+5 | Umair 40' | Report | Kumar 64'; Wolfe 67' | Attendance: 1,500; Referee: Ali Shaban (Kuwait) |

== First-team squad ==
As of 2 Jan 2014

Note: Flags indicate national team as defined under FIFA eligibility rules; some limited exceptions apply. Players may hold more than one non-FIFA nationality.

| No. | Pos. | Nation | Player |
|---|---|---|---|
| 1 | GK | IND | Arindam Bhattacharya |
| 3 | DF | IND | Charles Fernandes |
| 4 | MF | IND | William Colaco |
| 5 | DF | IND | Gurpreet Singh |
| 6 | DF | IND | Sudhakaran Kumar |
| 9 | MF | EGY | Abdelhamid Shabana |
| 10 | MF | IND | Micky Fernandes |
| 11 | MF | IND | Sanjay Balmuchu |
| 12 | DF | IND | Denzil Franco |
| 13 | DF | IND | Dharmaraj Ravanan (vice-captain) |
| 14 | MF | IND | Israil Gurung |
| 15 | MF | IND | Tirthankar Sarkar |
| 16 | MF | IND | Amandeep Singh |
| 17 | FW | IND | Balwant Singh |
| 18 | DF | IND | Thangjam Singh |

| No. | Pos. | Nation | Player |
|---|---|---|---|
| 19 | MF | IND | Anthony Barbosa |
| 20 | GK | IND | Lalit Thapa |
| 21 | GK | IND | Presley Mascarenhas |
| 22 | FW | IND | Jaison Vales |
| 24 | MF | IND | Lenny Rodrigues |
| 26 | DF | IND | Yumnam Raju |
| 28 | MF | IND | Bikramjit Singh |
| 29 | DF | IND | Satish Singh |
| 31 | MF | IND | Ashley Fernandes |
| 32 | DF | IND | Lionel Rodrigues |
| 33 | MF | IND | Richard Costa |
| 35 | FW | IND | Bineesh Balan |
| 39 | DF | IND | Dannies Fernandes |
| 45 | FW | IND | Biswajit Biswas |
| — | MF | IND | Alesh Sawant |
| — | MF | TTO | Anthony Wolfe |
| — | FW | CRC | Cristian Lagos |

== Transfers ==
=== In ===
| # | Position: | Player | From | Date | Source |
|---|---|---|---|---|---|
| — | MF | (India) Micky Fernandes | Air India | 21 May 2013 | |
| — | MF | (India) Tirthankar Sarkar | (India) Pailan Arrows | 21 May 2013 | |
| — | MF | (Japan) Shingo Nejime | (Japan) Roasso Kumamoto (Free Agent) | 7 June 2013 | |
| — | GK | (India) Arindam Bhattacharya | (India) Mohun Bagan | 16 June 2013 | |

=== Out ===
| Position: | Player | Moved to | Date | Source |
|---|---|---|---|---|
| MF | (Brazil) Beto | (India) Dempo | 26 May 2013 | |
| FW | (India) Sunil Chhetri | Sporting Portugal B (loan return) | 1 June 2013 | |
| FW | (Afghanistan) Balal Arezou | (Norway) Asker (loan return) | 1 June 2013 | |
| DF | (Senegal) Lamine Tamba | Released | 1 June 2013 | |
| MF | (India) Steven Dias | Released | 1 June 2013 | |
| GK | (India) Sandip Nandy | Released | 1 June 2013 | |
| MF | (India) Tomba Singh | Released | 1 June 2013 | |
| FW | (India) Xavier Vijay Kumar | Released | 1 June 2013 | |
| DF | (India) Gurtej Singh | Released | 1 June 2013 | |
| GK | (India) Felix D'Souza | (India) Salgaocar | 12 June 2013 | |

== Player statistics ==
As of 23 June 2014

| No. | Pos | Nat | Player | Total | | I-League | | Federation Cup | |
| No. | Pos | Nat | Player | Apps | Goals | Apps | Goals | Apps | Goals |
|---|---|---|---|---|---|---|---|---|---|
| 6 | DF | (India) IND | Sudhakaran Kumar | 0 | 0 | 0+0 | 0 | 0+0 | 0 |
| 7 | FW | (India) IND | Ajay Singh | 0 | 0 | 0+0 | 0 | 0+0 | 0 |
| 9 | FW | (Gabon) GAB | Henri Antchouet | 0 | 0 | 0+0 | 0 | 0+0 | 0 |
| 27 | DF | (Nigeria) NGR | Hammed Adesope | 0 | 0 | 0+0 | 0 | 0+0 | 0 |
| 11 | MF | (India) IND | Sanjay Balmuchu | 0 | 0 | 0+0 | 0 | 0+0 | 0 |
| 12 | DF | (India) IND | Denzil Franco | 0 | 0 | 0+0 | 0 | 0+0 | 0 |
| 13 | DF | (India) IND | Dharmaraj Ravanan | 0 | 0 | 0+0 | 0 | 0+0 | 0 |
| 14 | MF | (India) IND | Israil Gurung | 0 | 0 | 0+0 | 0 | 0+0 | 0 |
| 16 | MF | (India) IND | Amandeep Singh | 0 | 0 | 0+0 | 0 | 0+0 | 0 |
| 18 | DF | (India) IND | Thangjam Singh | 0 | 0 | 0+0 | 0 | 0+0 | 0 |
| 19 | GK | (India) IND | Lalit Thapa | 0 | 0 | 0+0 | 0 | 0+0 | 0 |
| 22 | FW | (India) IND | Jaison Vales | 0 | 0 | 0+0 | 0 | 0+0 | 0 |
| 24 | MF | (India) IND | Lenny Rodrigues | 0 | 0 | 0+0 | 0 | 0+0 | 0 |
| 26 | DF | (India) IND | Yumnam Raju | 0 | 0 | 0+0 | 0 | 0+0 | 0 |
| 28 | MF | (India) IND | Bikramjit Singh | 0 | 0 | 0+0 | 0 | 0+0 | 0 |
| 29 | DF | (India) IND | Satish Singh | 0 | 0 | 0+0 | 0 | 0+0 | 0 |
| 31 | MF | (India) IND | Ashley Fernandes | 0 | 0 | 0+0 | 0 | 0+0 | 0 |
| 33 | MF | (India) IND | Richard Costa | 0 | 0 | 0+0 | 0 | 0+0 | 0 |
| 35 | FW | (India) IND | Bineesh Balan | 0 | 0 | 0+0 | 0 | 0+0 | 0 |
| 39 | DF | (India) IND | Dannies Fernandes | 0 | 0 | 0+0 | 0 | 0+0 | 0 |
| 45 | FW | (India) IND | Biswajit Biswas | 0 | 0 | 0+0 | 0 | 0+0 | 0 |
| — | GK | (India) IND | Arindam Bhattacharya | 0 | 0 | 0+0 | 0 | 0+0 | 0 |
| — | MF | (India) IND | Micky Fernandes | 0 | 0 | 0+0 | 0 | 0+0 | 0 |
| — | MF | (India) IND | Tirthankar Sarkar | 0 | 0 | 0+0 | 0 | 0+0 | 0 |
| — | MF | (Japan) JPN | Shingo Nejime | 0 | 0 | 0+0 | 0 | 0+0 | 0 |
