= 2013–14 Mohammedan SC (Kolkata) season =

Indian football club season

Mohammedan S.C.
2013–14 season
- Chairman: Jamil Manzar
- Head Coach: Sanjoy Sen
- Stadium: Salt Lake Stadium
- I-League: 7th
- Durand Cup: Winners
- Indian Federation Cup: Group stage
- Top goalscorer: Josimar (7)
Home colours	Away colours

The Mohammedan Sporting Club, a football club of Kolkata, won the Durand Cup at the beginning of the 2013–14 season. In the I-League, they lost 6 of their first 13 matches and won 3. In mid-season Sanjoy Sen took over as coach.

== Competitions ==
=== Durand Cup ===
==== Quarter-finals ====
Team	Pld	W	D	L	GF	GA	GD	Pts
Mohammedan	2	2	0	0	7	3	+4	6
Kalighat MS	2	1	0	1	5	4	+1	3
Army Green	2	0	0	2	5	6	−1	0

==== Semi-finals ====
16 September 2013	Mumbai Tigers	1–3	Mohammedan	Ambedkar Stadium, Delhi
14:30 IST	Jairu 82'	Report	Orji 2'; C.Abranches 45+1'; Soren 65'

==== Final ====
19 September 2013	Mohammedan	2–1	ONGC	Ambedkar Stadium, New Delhi
17:30 IST	Soen 38'; Ozbey 45+2'	Report	Lavino 57'

=== I-League ===
==== Results by round ====
Round	1	2	3	4	5	6	7	8	9	10	11	12	13	14	15	16	17	18	19	20	21	22	23	24	25	26
Ground	H	A	A	A	H	A	A	H	H	A	H	H	A													
Result	L	L	L	W	D	W	L	W	D	D	D	L	L													
Position	11	12	12	13	10	10	8	9	7	7	7	11	11													

Updated to match(es) played on 1 December 2013. Source: I-leguage official
A = Away; H = Home; W = Win; D = Draw; L = Loss

==== Matches ====
Mohammedan S.C. results of I-League matches as of 22 December 2013

21 September 2013 1	Mohammedan S.C.	1–3	Pune FC	Kolkata
3:00 PM IST	Josimar 11'	Report	Raúl Fabiani 16'; James Meyer 52'; Raúl Fabiani 76'	Stadium: Salt Lake Stadium; Referee: U. Bora

6 October 2013 2	Salgaocar F.C.	3–0	Mohammedan S.C.
	Augustin Melwyn Fernandes; Darryl Duffy; Claude Gnakpa

10 October 2013 3	Bengaluru FC	2–1	Mohammedan S.C.
	John James Johnson; Sean Daniel Rooney		Josimar

20 October 2013 4	Rangdajied United F.C.	0–3	Mohammedan S.C.
			Josimar; Tolgay Özbey; Jerry Zirsanga

24 October 2013 5	Mohammedan S.C.	0–0	United Sports Club

27 October 2013 6	Sporting Clube de Goa	1–3	Mohammedan S.C.
	Boima Karpeh		Josimar; Ajay Singh

2 November 2013 7	Shillong Lajong FC	2–1	Mohammedan S.C.
	Uilliams Souza Silva		Josimar

6 November 2013 8	Mohammedan S.C.	1–0	Mumbai FC
	Josimar

23 November 2013 9	Mohammedan S.C.	0–0	Churchill Brothers SC	Kolkata
2:00 PM IST		Report		Stadium: Salt Lake Stadium; Referee: C. Srikrishna

27 November 2013 10	Mohun Bagan A.C.	0 -0	Mohammedan S.C.	Kolkata
5:00 PM IST		Report		Stadium: Salt Lake Stadium; Referee: M. Santosh Kumar

30 November 2013 11	Mohammedan S.C.	0–0	Dempo Sports Club	Kolkata
5:00 PM IST		Report		Stadium: Salt Lake Stadium; Referee: U. Bora

11 December 2013 12	Mohammedan S.C.	2–3	Bengaluru FC	Kolkata
3:30 PM IST	Josimar 45+1'; Josimar 57'	Report	John Menyongar 21'; Sunil Chhetri 48'; Sunil Chhetri 71'	Stadium: Salt Lake Stadium

15 December 2013 13	Churchill Brothers SC	3–1	Mohammedan S.C.	Goa
3:30 PM IST	Lenny Rodrigues 51'; Jaison Vales 71'; Balwant Singh 74 p'	Report	Ashim Biswas 86'	Stadium: Duler Stadium; Referee: A. Rowan

16 February 2014 14	Mohammedan S.C.	v	Shillong Lajong FC	Kolkata
12:00 AM IST				Stadium: Salt Lake Stadium

22 February 2014 15	Mohammedan S.C.	–	Salgaocar F.C.	Kolkata
12:00 AM IST				Stadium: Salt Lake Stadium

28 February 2014 16	Mohammedan S.C.	–	Sporting Clube de Goa	Kolkata
12:00 AM IST				Stadium: Salt Lake Stadium

=== Federation Cup ===
==== Group stage ====
Team	Pld	W	D	L	GF	GA	GD	Pts
Dempo	3	2	1	0	5	1	+4	7
Mohammedan	3	2	1	0	4	1	+3	7
Bhawanipore	3	1	0	2	2	4	−2	3
United Sikkim	3	0	0	3	1	6	−5	0

14 January 2014	Mohammedan	2–1	United Sikkim	MDS Complex, Manjeri
	Josimar 63'; Orji 70'	Report	Somide 85'

17 January 2014	Bhawanipore	0–2	Mohammedan	MDS Complex, Manjeri
		Report	Josimar 75'; Masih 90+2'

20 January 2014	Dempo	0–0	Mohammedan	MDS Complex, Manjeri
		Report

== Squad information ==
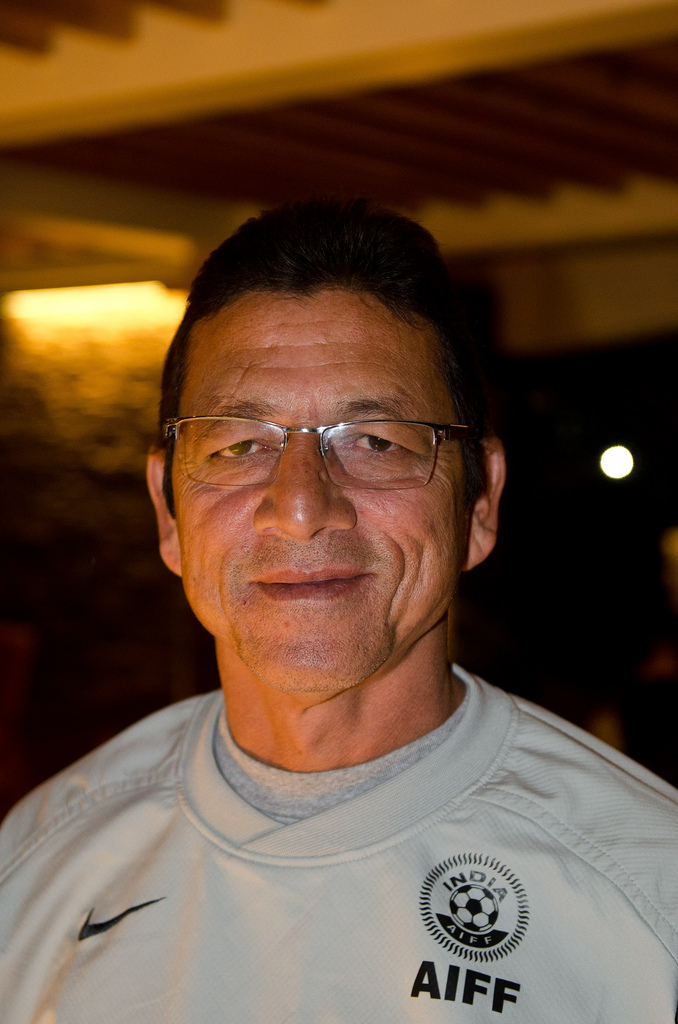
Head coach Sanjoy Sen

On 17 December 2013 Sanjoy Sen was officially announced as the new Coach of Mohammedan Sporting Club, replacing former coach Abdul Aziz Moshood.
