= 2013 Durand Cup final =

Final of the 126th edition of the Durand Cup

- Event: 2013 Durand Cup
Mohammedan	ONGC
2	1
- Date: 19 September 2013
- Venue: Ambedkar Stadium, Delhi

The 2013 Durand Cup final was a football match between Mohammedan and ONGC on 19 September 2013 at Ambedkar Stadium, Delhi. It was the final match of the 2013 Durand Cup, the 126th season of the Durand Cup, a football competition for Indian football system. Mohammedan were appearing in their third final and whereas ONGC were appearing in their first final.

Mohammedan wins Durand Cup by defeating ONGC 2-1.

== Route to the final ==
=== Mohammedan ===
Round	Opponents	Score
GS	Army Green FC	4–2
GS	Kalighat MS	3–1
SF	Mumbai Tigers	3–1

Mohammedan entered the Durand Cup at the 2013 Durand Cup Quarter-Finals and was paired in Group A with Army Green FC and Kalighat MS. They played their first match on 12 September 2013 against Army Green FC in which Mohammedan won 4–2 with 2 goals from Tolgay Özbey, one goal each from Collin Abranches and Penn Orji. Then on 14 September 2013 the club played their second match of the tournament against Kalighat MS in which they won 3–1 with 2 goals from Ajay Singh and one goal from Penn Orji. That victory managed to push Mohammedan through to the semi-finals in which they faced Mumbai Tigers on 16 September 2013. Mohammedan won the match 3–1 with goals from Collin Abranches, Penn Orji and Anthony Soren to move on to the final of the Durand Cup.

=== ONGC ===
Round	Opponents	Score
GS	Army Red FC	4–1
GS	Pune	2–1
SF	Indian Navy FC	1–0

ONGC also entered the Durand Cup via Group Stage. They won their first match on 11 September 2013 against Army Red FC 4–1 with 2 goals from Asim Hassan, and one goal each from Henry Ezeh and Parwinder Singh. Then they played their second match on 13 September 2013 against Pune and won 2-1 with 2 goals from Henry Ezeh to qualify for semi finals. In the semi-final ONGC played against Indian Navy on 17 September 2013, beating them 1–0 with goal from Henry Ezeh to qualify for the final.
