= 2013–14 Indian Federation Cup group stage =

The group stage of the 2013–14 Indian Federation Cup was played from 14 January to 21 January 2014. A total of sixteen teams competed in the group stage.

== Group A ==
Team	Pld	W	D	L	GF	GA	GD	Pts
Churchill Brothers	3	3	0	0	7	4	+3	9
Eagles	3	1	1	1	4	3	+1	4
United	3	1	0	2	2	4	−2	3
Pune	3	0	1	2	3	5	−2	1

14 January 2014
16:00 IST

Churchill Brothers	2–1	United
Shabana 5'; Singh 17'	Report	Martins 43'

Jawaharlal Nehru Stadium, Kochi
14 January 2014
19:00 IST

Pune	1–1	Eagles
Mustapha 55'	Report	Sakibo 78'

Jawaharlal Nehru Stadium, Kochi

17 January 2014
16:30 IST

United	1–0	Pune
Singh 71'	Report

Jawaharlal Nehru Stadium, Kochi
17 January 2014
19:00 IST

Eagles	1–2	Churchill Brothers
Sakibo 83'	Report	Singh 74'; Shabana 86'

Jawaharlal Nehru Stadium, Kochi

20 January 2014
16:35 IST

United	0–2	Eagles
	Report	Sakibo 12', 86'

Jawaharlal Nehru Stadium, Kochi
20 January 2014
19:00 IST

Churchill Brothers	3–2	Pune
Wolfe 8', 74'; Rodrigues 24'	Report	Fernandes 19', 53'

Jawaharlal Nehru Stadium, Kochi

== Group B ==
Team	Pld	W	D	L	GF	GA	GD	Pts
Sporting Goa	3	2	0	1	7	6	+1	6
East Bengal	3	1	1	1	4	3	+1	4
Bengaluru FC	3	1	1	1	6	6	0	4
Rangdajied United	3	0	2	1	2	4	−2	2

15 January 2014
17:00 IST

Bengaluru FC	5–3	Sporting Goa
Beingaichho 5', 40'; Chhetri 33'; Singh 66', 90+3'	Report	Karpeh 74'; D'Mello 89'; Fernandes 90+1'

MDS Complex, Manjeri
15 January 2014
19:30 IST

East Bengal	1–1	Rangdajied United
Moga 56'	Report	Seng-Yong 20'

MDS Complex, Manjeri

18 January 2014
17:00 IST

Sporting Goa	2–1	East Bengal
Fernandes 18'; D'Mello 85'	Report	Sueoka 58'

MDS Complex, Manjeri
18 January 2014
19:30 IST

Rangdajied United	1–1	Bengaluru FC
Tamba 80'	Report	Singh 2'

MDS Complex, Manjeri

21 January 2014
17:00 IST

Sporting Goa	2–0	Rangdajied United
Karpeh 54'; Fernandes 70'	Report

MDS Complex, Manjeri
21 January 2014
19:30 IST

East Bengal	2–0	Bengaluru FC
Edeh 62', 75'	Report

MDS Complex, Manjeri

== Group C ==
Team	Pld	W	D	L	GF	GA	GD	Pts
Mohun Bagan	3	2	1	0	8	1	+7	7
Shillong Lajong	3	2	0	1	8	6	+2	6
Salgaocar	3	1	1	1	3	6	−3	4
Mumbai	3	0	0	3	1	7	−6	0

15 January 2014

Salgaocar	0–4	Shillong Lajong
Tuboi 17'; Tlang 37'; Matsugae 46'; Glen 63'	Report

Jawaharlal Nehru Stadium, Kochi
15 January 2014

Mohun Bagan	1–0	Mumbai
Chizoba 27'	Report

Jawaharlal Nehru Stadium, Kochi

18 January 2014

Shillong Lajong	0–6	Mohun Bagan
	Report	Okolie 10', 77'; Chizoba 24', 60'; Yusa 31'; Howladar 90+3'

Jawaharlal Nehru Stadium, Kochi
18 January 2014

Mumbai	1–2	Salgaocar
Pradeep 46'	Report	Foschini 12'; Oliveira 74'

Jawaharlal Nehru Stadium, Kochi

21 January 2014

Shillong Lajong	4–0	Mumbai
Glen 16', 53', 90'; Haokip 24'	Report

Jawaharlal Nehru Stadium, Kochi
21 January 2014

Salgaocar	1–1	Mohun Bagan
Jairu 79'	Report	Okolie 58'

Jawaharlal Nehru Stadium, Kochi

== Group D ==
Team	Pld	W	D	L	GF	GA	GD	Pts
Dempo	3	2	1	0	5	1	+4	7
Mohammedan	3	2	1	0	4	1	+3	7
Bhawanipore	3	1	0	2	2	4	−2	3
United Sikkim	3	0	0	3	1	6	−5	0

14 January 2014

Dempo	2–1	Bhawanipore
George 67'; Beto 76'	Report	Dowry 9'

MDS Complex, Manjeri
14 January 2014

Mohammedan	2–1	United Sikkim
Josimar 63'; Orji 70'	Report	Somide 85'

MDS Complex, Manjeri

17 January 2014

Bhawanipore	0–2	Mohammedan
	Report	Josimar 75'; Masih 90+2'

MDS Complex, Manjeri
17 January 2014

United Sikkim	0–3	Dempo
	Report	Beto 23'; Özbey 45+1', 63'

MDS Complex, Manjeri

20 January 2014

Bhawanipore	1–0	United Sikkim
Bedemi 4'	Report

MDS Complex, Manjeri
20 January 2014

Dempo	0–0	Mohammedan
	Report

MDS Complex, Manjeri
