= 2013 Durand Cup quarter-finals =

This article details the 2013 Durand Cup quarter-finals.

The group stage features 12 teams: the 10 automatic qualifiers and the 2 winners of the preliminary stage.

The teams are drawn into four groups of three, and play each once. The matchdays are between 9 September to 15 September.

The top teams in each group advanced to the semi-finals.

== Group A ==
| Team | Pld | W | D | L | GF | GA | GD | Pts |
|---|---|---|---|---|---|---|---|---|
| Mumbai Tigers | 2 | 2 | 0 | 0 | 10 | 2 | +8 | 6 |
| United Sikkim | 2 | 1 | 0 | 1 | 5 | 7 | −2 | 3 |
| Assam Regiment Centre | 2 | 0 | 0 | 2 | 1 | 7 | −6 | 0 |

10 September 2013
13:30 IST

| Mumbai Tigers | 4 – 0 | Assam Regiment Centre |
|---|---|---|
| Jairu 9', 81'; P.Mohanraj 57'; Ambedkar 90' | Report |

Ambedkar Stadium, New Delhi

12 September 2013
13:30 IST

| Assam Regiment Centre | 1 – 3 | United Sikkim |
|---|---|---|
| Anal 40', 59' | Report | S Adelaja 40', 59'; Lepcha 89' |

Ambedkar Stadium, New Delhi

14 September 2013
15:30 IST

| Mumbai Tigers | 6 – 2 | United Sikkim |
|---|---|---|
| Jairu 25', 41', 45+2', 53'; Chhangte 86'; Z.Rehman 90+4' | Report | A.Singh 17'; Tamang 30' |

Ambedkar Stadium, New Delhi

== Group B ==
| Team | Pld | W | D | L | GF | GA | GD | Pts |
|---|---|---|---|---|---|---|---|---|
| Indian Navy | 2 | 1 | 1 | 0 | 2 | 0 | +2 | 4 |
| Bhawanipore | 2 | 1 | 1 | 0 | 4 | 3 | +1 | 4 |
| Air India | 2 | 0 | 0 | 2 | 3 | 6 | −3 | 0 |

11 September 2013
13:30 IST

| Air India | 0 – 2 | Indian Navy |
|---|---|---|
| | Report | Riyad B 76'; R.Rai 78' |

Ambedkar Stadium, New Delhi

13 September 2013
13:30 IST

| Bhawanipore | 0 – 0 | Indian Navy |
|---|---|---|
| | Report |

Ambedkar Stadium, New Delhi

15 September 2013
13:30 IST

| Air India | 3 – 4 | Bhawanipore |
|---|---|---|
| Johny Singh 45+3'; Suddesh A 58', 59' | Report | S.Dutta 25', 40'; M.Singh 78'; Barreto 90+3' |

Ambedkar Stadium, New Delhi

== Group C ==
| Team | Pld | W | D | L | GF | GA | GD | Pts |
|---|---|---|---|---|---|---|---|---|
| Mohammedan | 2 | 2 | 0 | 0 | 7 | 3 | +4 | 6 |
| Kalighat MS | 2 | 1 | 0 | 1 | 5 | 4 | +1 | 3 |
| Army Green | 2 | 0 | 0 | 2 | 5 | 6 | −1 | 0 |

10 September 2013
15:30 IST

| Kalighat MS | 4 – 1 | Army Green |
|---|---|---|
| P.Biswas 10'; Sunday 50', 75'; S.Majumdar 77' | Report | Nigil Raj 45' |

Ambedkar Stadium, New Delhi

12 September 2013
15:30 IST

| Mohammedan | 4 – 2 | Army Green |
|---|---|---|
| Ozbey 27', 36'; C.Abranches 61'; Orji 90' | Report | S.Singh 5'; S.Sarkar 52' |

Ambedkar Stadium, New Delhi

14 September 2013
13:30 IST

| Kalighat MS | 1 – 3 | Mohammedan |
|---|---|---|
| Dzisah 30' | Report | A.Singh 16', 61'; Orji 78' |

Ambedkar Stadium, New Delhi

== Group D ==
| Team | Pld | W | D | L | GF | GA | GD | Pts |
|---|---|---|---|---|---|---|---|---|
| ONGC | 2 | 2 | 0 | 0 | 6 | 2 | +4 | 6 |
| Army Red | 2 | 1 | 0 | 1 | 3 | 4 | −1 | 3 |
| Pune | 2 | 0 | 0 | 2 | 1 | 4 | −3 | 0 |

9 September 2013
17:45 IST

| Pune | 0 – 2 | Army Red |
|---|---|---|
| | Report | TV Vipin 37' (pen.); C Lallidianmawaya 87' |

Ambedkar Stadium, New Delhi

11 September 2013
13:30 IST

| Army Red | 1 – 4 | ONGC |
|---|---|---|
| TV Vipin 19' (pen.) | Report | Hassan 39', 58'; Ezeh 64'; P.Singh 76' |

Ambedkar Stadium, New Delhi

13 September 2013
15:30 IST

| ONGC | 2 – 1 | Pune |
|---|---|---|
| Hassan 64' (o.g.) | Report | Ezeh 60' (pen.), 63' |

Ambedkar Stadium, New Delhi
