= 2013 Durand Cup =

126th edition of the Durand Cup

Durand Cup
Tournament details
- Country: India
- Teams: 12

Final positions
- Champions: Mohammedan (2nd title)
- Runners-up: ONGC

Tournament statistics
- Matches played: 25
- Goals scored: 63 (2.52 per match)
- Top goal scorer: (India) Bikash Jairu (7)

The 2013 Durand Cup was the 126th season of the Durand Cup, the third oldest football tournament in the world, which is a knock-out competition held in India. Air India were the current holders, having beaten Mumbai Tigers 3–2 on penalties after the match ended 0-0 after 120 minutes in the 2012 Final.

The tournament is held from 2 September to 19 September with all matches at the Ambedkar Stadium in New Delhi.

== Preliminary round ==
2 September 2013	Indian Air Force	2 – 3	Youngster Club	Ambedkar Stadium, Delhi
13:30 IST	V.Kumar 69'; Mandeep 81'		A.Javed 31'; R.Negi 65'; A.Kataria 80'

2 September 2013	Assam Regiment Centre	3 – 1	CRPF FT	Ambedkar Stadium, Delhi
15:45 IST	R.Singh 8'; A.Swarna 12'; K.Singh 90+3'		Sugesh M 29'

3 September 2013	ASC Bangalore	2 – 0	Delhi United	Ambedkar Stadium, Delhi
13:30 IST	Ramachandran 2', 32'

3 September 2013	Garhwal Heros	2 – 2 (a.e.t.) (4 – 5 p)	Indian Navy	Ambedkar Stadium, Delhi
15:45 IST	M.Choudhary 42'; K.Rawat 68'		Riyad B 40', 46'

4 September 2013	Assam Regiment Centre	2 – 1	BSF	Ambedkar Stadium, Delhi
13:30 IST	R.Singh 42'; A.Swarna 53'		B.Singh 28'

4 September 2013	TATA FA	0 – 1	Youngster Club	Ambedkar Stadium, Delhi
15:30 IST			A.Singh 54'

5 September 2013	Indian Navy	1 – 0	Kerala Police	Ambedkar Stadium, Delhi
13:30 IST	Riyad B 54'

5 September 2013	Assam Rifles	1 – 1 (4 – 3 p)	ASC Bangalore	Ambedkar Stadium, Delhi
15:30 IST	D Mukhim 90+2'		Ramachandran 88'

6 September 2013	Assam Regiment Centre	0 – 0 (5 – 4 p)	Youngster Club	Ambedkar Stadium, Delhi
15:00 IST

7 September 2013	Indian Navy	2 – 0	Assam Rifles	Ambedkar Stadium, Delhi
15:00 IST	R.Rai 44'; P.Singh 74'

== Quarter-finals ==
The quarter-finals of the Durand Cup shall be played between 12 teams. Four of the teams currently played in 2012–13 I-League and four played in the 2013 I-League 2nd Division. The other four spots would have been taken up by the top two teams from the preliminary round plus two services team.

=== Group A ===
Team	Pld	W	D	L	GF	GA	GD	Pts
Mumbai Tigers	2	2	0	0	10	2	+8	6
United Sikkim	2	1	0	1	5	7	−2	3
Assam Regiment Centre	2	0	0	2	1	7	−6	0

=== Group B ===
Team	Pld	W	D	L	GF	GA	GD	Pts
Indian Navy	2	1	1	0	2	0	+2	4
Bhawanipore	2	1	1	0	4	3	+1	4
Air India	2	0	0	2	3	6	−3	0

=== Group C ===
Team	Pld	W	D	L	GF	GA	GD	Pts
Mohammedan	2	2	0	0	7	3	+4	6
Kalighat MS	2	1	0	1	5	4	+1	3
Army Green	2	0	0	2	5	6	−1	0

=== Group D ===
Team	Pld	W	D	L	GF	GA	GD	Pts
ONGC	2	2	0	0	6	2	+4	6
Army Red	2	1	0	1	3	4	−1	3
Pune	2	0	0	2	1	4	−3	0

== Semi-finals ==
16 September 2013	Mumbai Tigers	1 – 3	Mohammedan	Ambedkar Stadium, Delhi
14:30 IST	Jairu 82'	Report	Orji 2'; C.Abranches 45+1'; Soren 65'

17 September 2013	Indian Navy	0 – 1	ONGC	Ambedkar Stadium, Delhi
14:30 IST		Report	Ezeh 63'

== Final ==
19 September 2013	Mohammedan	2 – 1	ONGC	Ambedkar Stadium, New Delhi
17:30 IST	Soen 38'; Ozbey 45+2'	Report	Lavino 57'

== Scorers ==
All goals from tournament proper. Goals from qualifiers are not counted in this list.

7 goals

- . (India) Bikash Jairu (Mumbai Tigers)

4 goals

- . (Nigeria) Henry Ezeh (ONGC)

3 goals

- . (Nigeria) Penn Orji (Mohammedan)
- . (Australia) Tolgay Özbey (Mohammedan)

2 goals

- . (Nigeria) Joel Sunday (Kalighat MS)
- . (India) TV Vipin (Army Red FC)
- . (India) Asim Hassan (ONGC)
- . (India) S Adelaja (United Sikkim)
- . (India) Collin Abranches (Mohammedan)
- . (India) Ajay Singh (Mohammedan)
- . (India) Snehasish Dutta (Bhawanipore)
- . Suddesh A (Air India)

1 goal

- . (India) C Lallidianmawaya (Army Red FC)
- . (India) Abhishek Ambedkar (Mumbai Tigers)
- . (India) Pradeep Mohanraj (Mumbai Tigers)
- . (India) Phaoom Biswas (Kalighat MS)
- . (India) Suvojit Hazra (Kalighat MS)
- . (India) Charles Dzisah (Kalighat MS)
- . (India) Nigil Raj (Army Green)
- . (India) Sanaton Singh (Army Green)
- . (India) Subrata Sarkar (Army Green)
- . (India) Riyad B (Indian Navy FC)
- . (India) Raman Rai (Indian Navy)
- . (India) Parwinder Singh (ONGC)
- . (India) Lavino Fernandes (ONGC)
- . (India) Nim Lepcha (United Sikkim)
- . (India) Amrit Pal Singh (United Sikkim)
- . (India) Nima Tamang (United Sikkim)
- . (India) TS Workham Anal (Assam Regimental Centre)
- . (India) Anthony Soren (Mohammedan)
- . (India) Mohammed Soen (Mohammedan)
- . (India) Manjit Singh (Bhawanipore)
- . (India) Jose Ramirez Barreto (Bhawanipore)
- . Johny Singh (Air India)
