= 2013–14 Indian Federation Cup =

35th edition of the Federation Cup

2013–14 Federation Cup
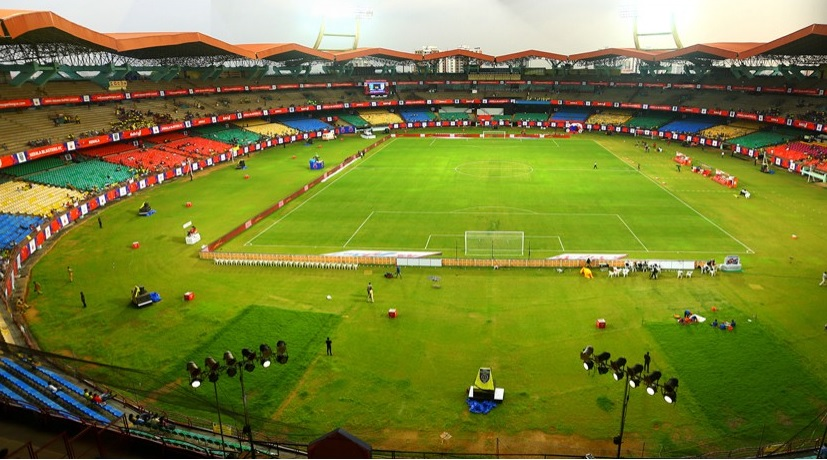
- Jawaharlal Nehru Stadium hosted the final on 25 January 2014

Tournament details
- Country: India
- Teams: 16

Final positions
- Champions: Churchill Brothers (1st title)
- Runners-up: Sporting Goa

Tournament statistics
- Matches played: 29
- Goals scored: 79 (2.72 per match)

The 2013–14 Indian Federation Cup was the 35th edition of the Federation Cup, the main domestic cup competition in Indian football. A total of 16 teams played in this edition of the tournament in which they all entered in the group stage consisting of four groups of four teams each.

The defending champions were East Bengal, who beat Dempo 3–2 in the 2012 final.

The final was played on 25 January 2014 at the Jawaharlal Nehru Stadium in Kochi, Kerala between Churchill Brothers and Sporting Goa, with Churchill Brothers winning 3–1.

== Teams ==
This edition of the Federation Cup saw 16 teams taking part in the tournament, 13 of which came from the ongoing I-League with the other three coming from the I-League 2nd Division. Originally, the three 2nd Division teams to take part in the tournament were to be Bhawanipore, Langsning, and United Sikkim, however, Langning withdrew. As a replacement, Eagles were allowed to enter the tournament for fulfilling the AFC Criteria and also to add a local team from Kerala into the tournament.

Teams
From I-League	From I-League 2nd Division
• Bengaluru FC • Churchill Brothers • Dempo • East Bengal • Mohammedan • Mohun Bagan • Mumbai • Pune • Rangdajied United • Salgaocar • Shillong Lajong • Sporting Goa • United	• Bhawanipore • Eagles • United Sikkim

== Venues ==
The venues for the Federation Cup were announced in 2013, with the Jawaharlal Nehru Stadium and the MDS Complex being chosen to host matches.The Jawaharlal Nehru Stadium hosted matches for Group A and C while the MDS Complex hosted Group B and D matches. The semi-finals and final took place at the Jawaharlal Nehru Stadium.

Kochi	Manjeri
Jawaharlal Nehru Stadium	MDS Complex
Capacity: 30,000	Capacity: 22,000

== Group stage ==
Key to colours in group tables
Top placed team advances to the semi-finals

=== Group A ===
Team	Pld	W	D	L	GF	GA	GD	Pts
Churchill Brothers	3	3	0	0	7	4	+3	9
Eagles	3	1	1	1	4	3	+1	4
United	3	1	0	2	2	4	−2	3
Pune	3	0	1	2	3	5	−2	1

=== Group B ===
Team	Pld	W	D	L	GF	GA	GD	Pts
Sporting Goa	3	2	0	1	7	6	+1	6
East Bengal	3	1	1	1	4	3	+1	4
Bengaluru FC	3	1	1	1	6	6	0	4
Rangdajied United	3	0	2	1	2	4	−2	2

=== Group C ===
Team	Pld	W	D	L	GF	GA	GD	Pts
Mohun Bagan	3	2	1	0	8	1	+7	7
Shillong Lajong	3	2	0	1	8	6	+2	6
Salgaocar	3	1	1	1	3	6	−3	4
Mumbai	3	0	0	3	1	7	−6	0

=== Group D ===
Team	Pld	W	D	L	GF	GA	GD	Pts
Dempo	3	2	1	0	5	1	+4	7
Mohammedan	3	2	1	0	4	1	+3	7
Bhawanipore	3	1	0	2	2	4	−2	3
United Sikkim	3	0	0	3	1	6	−5	0

== Semi-finals ==
23 January 2014	Churchill Brothers	2–1	Mohun Bagan	Jawaharlal Nehru Stadium, Kochi
	Singh 4'; Wolfe 14'	Report	Okolie 33'

23 January 2014	Sporting Goa	3–2 (a.e.t.)	Dempo	Jawaharlal Nehru Stadium, Kochi
	Karpeh 30'; Arturo 82' (pen.), 115' (pen.)	Report	Özbey 72'; Amiri 88'

== Final ==
25 January 2014	Churchill Brothers	3–1	Sporting Goa	Jawaharlal Nehru Stadium, Kochi
	Singh 21'; Sawant 47'; Shabana 67'	Report	Fernandes 62'

== Goalscorers ==
4 goals:

- (India) Balwant Singh (Churchill Brothers)
- (Trinidad and Tobago) Cornell Glen (Shillong Lajong)
- (Nigeria) Koko Sakibo (Eagles)
- (India) Victorino Fernandes (Sporting Goa)
- (Nigeria) Odafe Onyeka Okolie (Mohun Bagan)

3 goals:

- (Egypt) Abdelhamid Shabana (Churchill Brothers)
- (Nigeria) Christopher Chizoba (Mohun Bagan)
- (Trinidad and Tobago) Anthony Wolfe (Churchill Brothers)
- (Australia) Boima Karpeh (Sporting Goa)
- (Australia) Tolgay Özbey (Dempo)

2 goals:

- (India) Beikhokhei Beingaichho (Bengaluru FC)
- (Nigeria) Chidi Edeh (East Bengal)
- (India) Beevan D'Mello (Sporting Goa)
- (India) Robin Singh (Bengaluru FC)
- (Brazil) Josimar (Mohammedan)
- (Brazil) Roberto Mendes Silva (Dempo)
- (Spain) Arturo Navarro (Sporting Goa)

1 goal:

- (India) Sunil Chhetri (Bengaluru FC)
- (India) Alesh Sawant (Churchill Brothers)
- (India) Dipendu Dowary (Bhawanipore)
- (Afghanistan) Zohib Islam Amiri (Dempo)
- (India) Rakesh Masih (Mohammedan)
- (Nigeria) Penn Orji (Mohammedan)
- (India) Pappachen Pradeep (Mumbai)
- (Senegal) Lamine Tamba (Rangdajied United)
- (Australia) Matthew Foschini (Salgaocar)
- (India) Seikhohau Tuboi (Shillong Lajong)
- (Nigeria) Ranti Martins (United)
- (India) Thoi Singh (Bengaluru FC)
- (India) Lenny Rodrigues (Churchill Brothers)
- (Japan) Ryuji Sueoka (East Bengal)
- (Japan) Katsumi Yusa (Mohun Bagan)
- (Netherlands) Riga Mustapha (Pune)
- (India) Bikash Jairu (Salgaocar)
- (India) Boithang Haokip (Shillong Lajong)
- (Japan) Taisuke Matsugae (Shillong Lajong)
- (Nigeria) Oluwaunmi Somide (United Sikkim)
- (Nigeria) Daniel Bedemi (Bhawanipore)
- (India) George Alwyn (Dempo)
- (South Sudan) James Moga (East Bengal)
- (India) Ujjal Howladar (Mohan Bagan)
- (North Korea) Kim Seng-Yong (Rangdajied United)
- (India) Gilbert Oliveira (Salgaocar)
- (India) Redeem Tlang (Shillong Lajong)
- (India) Baldeep Singh (United)

== See also ==
- Federation Cup
- I-League
