= 2013–14 Dempo SC season =

Indian football club season

Dempo
2013-14 season
- Chairman: Srinivas Dempo
- Manager: Arthur Papas
- Stadium: Duler Stadium
Home colours	Away colours

The 2013–14 Dempo S.C. season is the club's 46th season since their formation in 1967 and their 16th season ever in the I-League, India's top football league.

== Transfers ==
In: Note: Flags indicate national team as defined under FIFA eligibility rules; some limited exceptions apply. Players may hold more than one non-FIFA nationality.

No.	Pos.	Nation	Player
—	MF	BRA	Beto (from Churchill Brothers)
—	MF	IND	Jewel Raja (from Mohun Bagan)
—	DF	IND	Prathamesh Maulingkar (from Pailan Arrows)
—	MF	IND	Gabriel Fernandes (from Mumbai)
—	DF	AUS	Simon Colosimo (from (Australia) Melbourne Heart)
—	FW	IRL	Billy Mehmet (Free Agent)
—	FW	IND	Jeje Lalpekhlua (from Pune)

Out: Note: Flags indicate national team as defined under FIFA eligibility rules; some limited exceptions apply. Players may hold more than one non-FIFA nationality.

No.	Pos.	Nation	Player
—	FW	JPN	Ryuji Sueoka (to East Bengal)
—	DF	IND	Selwyn Fernandes (Released)
—	DF	IND	Marcus Peixoto (Released)
—	DF	IND	Covan Lawrence (Released)
—	FW	NGA	Koko Sakibo (Released)
—	MF	LBR	Johnny Menyongar (Released)
—	GK	IND	Regan Juliao (Released)
—	DF	IND	Rowilson Rodrigues (to Mohun Bagan)
—	FW	IND	Joaquim Abranches (Released)
—	MF	IND	Anthony Pereira (Released)
—	DF	IND	Valeriano Rebello (Released)
—	FW	IND	Cliffton Gonsalves (Released)
—	MF	IND	Climax Lawrence (to Mumbai)

== Federation Cup ==
=== Group stage ===
Group D

Team	Pld	W	D	L	GF	GA	GD	Pts
Dempo	3	2	1	0	5	1	+4	4
Mohammedan	3	2	1	0	4	1	+3	4
Bhawanipore	3	1	0	2	2	4	–2	3
United Sikkim	3	0	0	3	1	6	–5	0

14 January 2014	Dempo	2–1	Bhawanipore	MDS Complex, Manjeri
	George 67'; Beto 76'	Report	Dowry 9'

17 January 2014	United Sikkim	0–3	Dempo	MDS Complex, Manjeri
		Report	Beto 23'; Özbey 45+1', 63'

20 January 2014	Dempo	0–0	Mohammedan	MDS Complex, Manjeri
		Report

=== Semi-final ===
23 January 2014	Sporting Goa	3–2 (a.e.t.)	Dempo	Jawaharlal Nehru Stadium, Kochi
	Karpeh 30'; Arturo 82' (pen.), 115' (pen.)	Report	Özbey 72'; Amiri 88'
