= 2009–10 Indian Federation Cup final =

- Event: 2009–10 Indian Federation Cup
Shillong Lajong	East Bengal
0	0
- East Bengal won 3–0 on penalties
- Date: 3 January 2010
- Venue: Nehru Stadium, Guwahati, Assam
- Man of the Match: Abhra Mondal
- Referee: Vishnu Chauhan

The 2009–10 Indian Federation Cup final was the 32nd final of the Indian Federation Cup, the top knock-out competition in India, and was contested between Kolkata giants East Bengal and Shillong Lajong on 3 January 2010.

East Bengal won the final 3–0 via penalty shootouts after the game ended 0–0 after added extra time, to claim their sixth Federation Cup title.

== Route to the final ==
=== East Bengal ===
Round	Date	Opposition	Score
Group Stage	22 December 2009	Viva Kerala	0–0
Group Stage	24 December 2009	Salgaocar	1–0
Group Stage	27 December 2009	JCT	1–0
Semi-final	31 December 2009	Mohun Bagan	2–0

East Bengal entered the 2009–10 Indian Federation Cup automatically as they were already in the I-League. They were placed in Group A along with JCT, Salgaocar and Viva Kerala and their matches were played in Satindra Mohan Dev Stadium, Silchar. The tournament got off to mixed start for East Bengal as they drew goalless in their opening fixture against Viva Kerala and then defeated Salgaocar 1–0 in their second match. Yusif Yakubu scored in the 15th minute of the match. In the third match against JCT, East Bengal required a win to qualify and they managed to defeat the Punjab side by 1–0 with Bhaichung Bhutia scoring the winner in the 80th minute to take East Bengal into the Semi-finals. In the Semi-final, East Bengal faced their arch-rivals Mohun Bagan at the Nehru Stadium in Guwahati, with the memories of 5–3 defeat in the I-League match still fresh, the Red and Gold brigade took their revenge as they defeated Mohun Bagan by 2–0 with goals from Yusif Yakubu and Mehtab Hossain to reach the final. José Ramirez Barreto missed a penalty in the first half for Bagan.

=== Shillong Lajong ===
Round	Date	Opposition	Score
Group Stage	22 December 2009	Air India	2–2
Group Stage	24 December 2009	Dempo	2–1
Group Stage	27 December 2009	Pune FC	1–1
Semi-final	30 December 2009	Churchill Brothers	1–0

Shillong Lajong entered the 2009–10 Indian Federation Cup automatically as they were already in the I-League. They were placed in Group D along with Air India, Dempo and Pune FC and their matches were played in Nehru Stadium in Guwahati. Lajong were the underdogs in the group and began their campaign with a 1–1 draw against Air India. In their second match, they stunned the reigning I-League champions Dempo with a 2–1 win and with Dempo already losing their first match to Pune, Lajong required a draw against Pune to secure their qualification into the Semi-finals. In the last group game, Lajong drew 1-1 and confirmed their spot in the Semis for the very first time. In the Semi-final, Lajong faced favourites Churchill Brothers but their fairy-tale run continued as they caused another upset with a 1–0 win courtesy of a solitary strike from Seikhohau Tuboi to reach their maiden Federation Cup final.

== Match ==
=== Details ===
3 January 2010
18:30 IST

Shillong Lajong	0 – 0 (a.e.t.)	East Bengal
	Report
Penalties
Gurung (penalty missed); Ramengmawia (penalty missed); Lyngshing (penalty missed)	0–3	Yakubu (penalty scored); Chettri (penalty scored); Khabra (penalty missed); Pradhan (penalty scored)

Nehru Stadium, Guwahati
Attendance: 25,000 (est.)
Referee: Vishu Chauhan

Shillong Lajong	East Bengal

GK	1	(India) Gumpe Rime (c)
RB	13	(India) Boithang Haokip	(substituted off) 80'
CB	4	(India) Zohmingliana Ralte
CB	3	(India) Wailadmi Passah
LB	6	(India) Ailad Kynta
DM	16	(India) Niwan O Gatpoh
CM	8	(India) Ramengmawia
MF	18	(India) Lyngshing
ST	15	(India) Seikhohau Tuboi
ST	27	(Brazil) Ronald Zothanzama	(substituted off) 55'
ST	10	(Nepal) Gurung
Substitutes:
MF	7	(India) Ronald		(substituted on) 80'
FW	9	(India) Bengkok Nameirakpam		(substituted on) 55'
Manager:
(India) Stanley Rozario

GK	1	(India) Abhra Mondal (c)
LB	29	(India) Saumik Dey	(substituted off) 70'
CB	26	(India) Mehrajuddin Wadoo
CB	4	(Nigeria) Uga Okpara
RB	3	(India) Nirmal Chettri
CM	7	(India) Harmanjot Khabra
CM	14	(India) Mehtab Hossain
RW	22	(Nigeria) Sanju Pradhan
LW	19	(India) Syed Rahim Nabi	(substituted off) 66'
ST	24	(India) Subhash Singh	(substituted off) 60'
ST	12	(Ghana) Yusif Yakubu
Substitutes:
DF	33	(India) Saikat Saha Roy	(substituted on) 70'
MF	35	(India) Budhiram Tudu	(substituted on) 60'
FW	15	(India) Bhaichung Bhutia	(substituted on) 66'
Manager:
(Belgium) Philippe De Ridder
