= Football Players' Association of India =

Trade union in India

- Abbreviation: FPAI
- Founded: 13 August 2006; 19 years ago
- Type: Professional football player organisation
- Location: Kolkata, India
- Region served: India
- Official language: English
- President: Renedy Singh
- Affiliations: FIFPro (since 2007)
- Website: www.thefpai.net

The Football Players' Association of India or (FPAI) is an association for Indian association footballers. Created in 2006, it aims to "look after the welfare of players and educate and advice them by engaging professionals". It was created by former Indian national team captain Bhaichung Bhutia. In 2007, it got affiliated to FIFPro.

== History ==
The FPAI was formed on 13 August 2006 as a brainchild of the India national football team's of the then captain, Bhaichung Bhutia. He said that the body would "function as the parent body of the players" and added that it would "work with the national and state associations for the game's development" and ensure "fair treatment for footballers". Membership was opened to players, both Indian and foreign.

FPAI became an affiliate of FIFPRO on 18 November 2009 at the FIFPro Congress in Budapest.

Beyond player representation, the FPAI has also focused on issues involving contract stability, delayed salaries, medical support and post-retirement planning for footballers in India. The organisation has worked alongside FIFPRO and domestic football authorities to raise awareness about player welfare standards in Indian football, particularly during the expansion of the Indian Super League and other professional competitions.

The association has also organised the annual FPAI Indian Football Awards, where professional footballers vote for players, coaches and emerging talents across Indian football. The awards are considered among the few peer-recognised honours in the country's football system.

== FPAI Awards ==
In 2009, the FPAI announced annual awards in four categories. In 2022, awards in women's category were introduced. Current FPAI awards are the following:

- FPAI Indian Player of the Year (Men's and Women's)
- FPAI Foreign Player of the Year (Men's)
- FPAI Young Player of the Year (Men's and Women's)
- FPAI Coach of the Year (Men's)

=== Winners ===
2009–2021
Year	Indian Player of the Year	Foreign Player of the Year	Young Player of the Year	Coach of the Year	Ref
2008–09	Sunil Chhetri	(Nigeria) Odafa Okolie	Baljit Sahni	(England) Dave Booth	
2009–10	Mohammed Rafi	(Nigeria) Odafa Okolie	Joaquim Abranches	(India) Armando Colaco	
2010–11	Mehtab Hussain	(Brazil) Beto	Jeje Lalpekhlua	(Morocco) Karim Bencherifa	
2011–12	Syed Rahim Nabi	(Nigeria) Ranti Martins	Manandeep Singh	(England) Trevor Morgan	
2012–13	Lenny Rodrigues	(Nigeria) Ranti Martins	Alwyn George	(India) Derrick Pereira	
2013–14	Balwant Singh	(Scotland) Darryl Duffy	Alwyn George	(England) Ashley Westwood	
2014–15	Eugeneson Lyngdoh	(Haiti) Sony Nordé	Thongkhosiem Haokip	(India) Santosh Kashyap	
2015–16	Jeje Lalpekhlua	(Nigeria) Ranti Martins	Udanta Singh Kumam	(England) Ashley Westwood	
2016–17	Anas Edathodika	(Liberia) Alfred Jaryan	Udanta Singh Kumam	(India) Khalid Jamil	
2017–18	Sunil Chhetri	(Colombia) Miku	Jerry Mawihmingthanga	(Spain) Albert Roca	
2018–19	Sunil Chhetri	(Spain) Coro	Lallianzuala Chhangte	(Netherlands) Eelco Schattorie	
2019–20	Sunil Chhetri	(Fiji) Roy Krishna	Jerry Mawihmingthanga	(Spain) Sergio Lobera	
2020–21	Arindam Bhattacharya	(Spain) Igor Angulo	Lalengmawia Ralte	(India) Khalid Jamil	

2022–present
Year	Indian Player of the Year (Men's)	Indian Player of the Year (Women's)	Foreign Player of the Year	Young Player of the Year (Men's)	Young Player of the Year (Women's)	Coach of the Year	Ref
2021–22	Liston Colaco	Anju Tamang	(Nigeria) Bartholomew Ogbeche	Akash Mishra	Manisha Kalyan	(Spain) Manolo Márquez	
2022–23	Lallianzuala Chhangte	Grace Dangmei	(Scotland) Greg Stewart	Sivasakthi Narayanan	Naketa Bishnoi	(England) Des Buckingham	

== Key personnel ==
=== Management committee ===
- President: Renedy Singh (IMG-Reliance)
- Vice-presidents:
  - Sunil Chhetri (Bengaluru FC, ISL)
  - Abhishek Yadav (AIFF)
  - Clifford Miranda (FC Goa, ISL)
  - Alvito D'Cunha

==== Past Presidents ====
- Bhaichung Bhutia (2006–2014)

== See also ==
- Football in India
- All India Football Federation
