= FPAI Indian Player of the Year =

Annual award

The FPAI Indian Player of the Year is an annual award given to an Indian player who is adjudged to have been the best of the season in Indian football. The award has been presented since the 2008–09 season and the winner is chosen by a vote amongst the members of the Football Players' Association of India (FPAI). Sunil Chhetri won the inaugural award in 2009. The women's category has also been introduced in 2022, with Anju Tamang being the first winner.

== Men's Player of the Year ==
FPAI Indian Player of the Year (Men's)
- Sport: Association football
- Competition: All levels of Indian football
- Country: India
- Presented by: FPAI

History
- First award: 2009
- First winner: Sunil Chhetri
- Most wins: Sunil Chhetri (5)
- Most recent: Lallianzuala Chhangte (2026)

FPAI Indian Player of the Year (Men's)
Year	Player	Club(s)	Ref
2008–09	Sunil Chhetri	Dempo	
2009–10	Mohammed Rafi	Mahindra United	
2010–11	Mehtab Hussain	East Bengal	
2011–12	Syed Rahim Nabi	Mohun Bagan	
2012–13	Lenny Rodrigues	Churchill Brothers	
2013–14	Balwant Singh	Churchill Brothers	
2014–15	Eugeneson Lyngdoh	Bengaluru	
2015–16	Jeje Lalpekhlua	Mohun Bagan, Chennaiyin	
2016–17	Anas Edathodika	Mohun Bagan, Delhi Dynamos	
2017–18	Sunil Chhetri (2)	Bengaluru	
2018–19	Sunil Chhetri (3)	Bengaluru	
2019–20	Sunil Chhetri (4)	Bengaluru	
2020–21	Arindam Bhattacharya	ATK Mohun Bagan	[13]
2021–22	Liston Colaco	ATK Mohun Bagan	[14]
2022–23	Lallianzuala Chhangte	Mumbai City	[15]
2023-24	Lallianzuala Chhangte (2)	Mumbai City	[16]
2024-25	Sunil Chhetri (5)	Bengaluru	[17]
2025-26	Lallianzuala Chhangte (3)	Mohun Bagan Super Giants	[18]

== Women's Player of the Year ==
FPAI Indian Player of the Year (Women's)
- Sport: Association football
- Competition: All levels of Indian football
- Country: India
- Presented by: FPAI

History
- First award: 2022
- First winner: Anju Tamang
- Most recent: Grace Dangmei (2023)

FPAI Indian Player of the Year (Women's)
Year	Player	Club(s)	Ref
2021–22	Anju Tamang	Gokulam Kerala	
2022–23	Grace Dangmei	Gokulam Kerala	

== See also ==
- AIFF Player of the Year Awards
- Football Players' Association of India
- Football in India
