= Sandeep Sangha =

Indian footballer (born 1987)

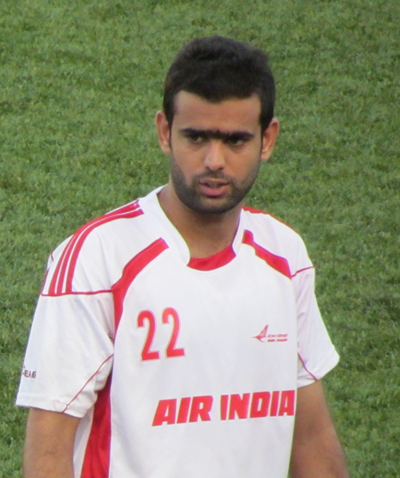

Personal information
- Full name: Sandeep Sangha
- Date of birth: 18 July 1987 (age 39)
- Place of birth: Punjab, India
- Height: 1.84 m (6 ft 1/2 in)
- Position: Midfielder

Team information
- Current team: Mohammedan
- Number: 4

Senior career*
Years	Team	Apps	(Gls)
2008–2010	ONGC		
2011–2012	Air India		
2012–13	ONGC	22	(0)
2013–present	Mohammedan	14	(0)
- * Club domestic league appearances and goals as of 27 April 2014

Sandeep Sangha (born 1987) is an Indian professional football player, currently playing for Mohammedan S.C. in the I-League as a defender.

== Career ==
=== Mohammedan ===
After spending one year with ONGC F.C., on 31 May 2013 it was confirmed that Sangha has signed with Mohammedan on a one-year contract along with Collin Abranches. He made his professional debut in the I-League on 21 September 2013 against Pune at the Salt Lake Stadium and played the entire match, as Mohammedan lost the match 1–3.

== Career statistics ==
=== Club ===
As of 27 April 2014

Club	Season	League		Federation Cup		Durand Cup		AFC		Total	
Club	Season	Apps	Goals	Apps	Goals	Apps	Goals	Apps	Goals	Apps	Goals
ONGC	2012-13	22	0	1	0	-	-	-	-	23	0
Mohammedan	2013-14	14	0	0	0	0	0	-	-	14	0
Career total		36	0	1	0	0	0	0	0	37	0
