= Charles Dzisah =

Ghanaian footballer

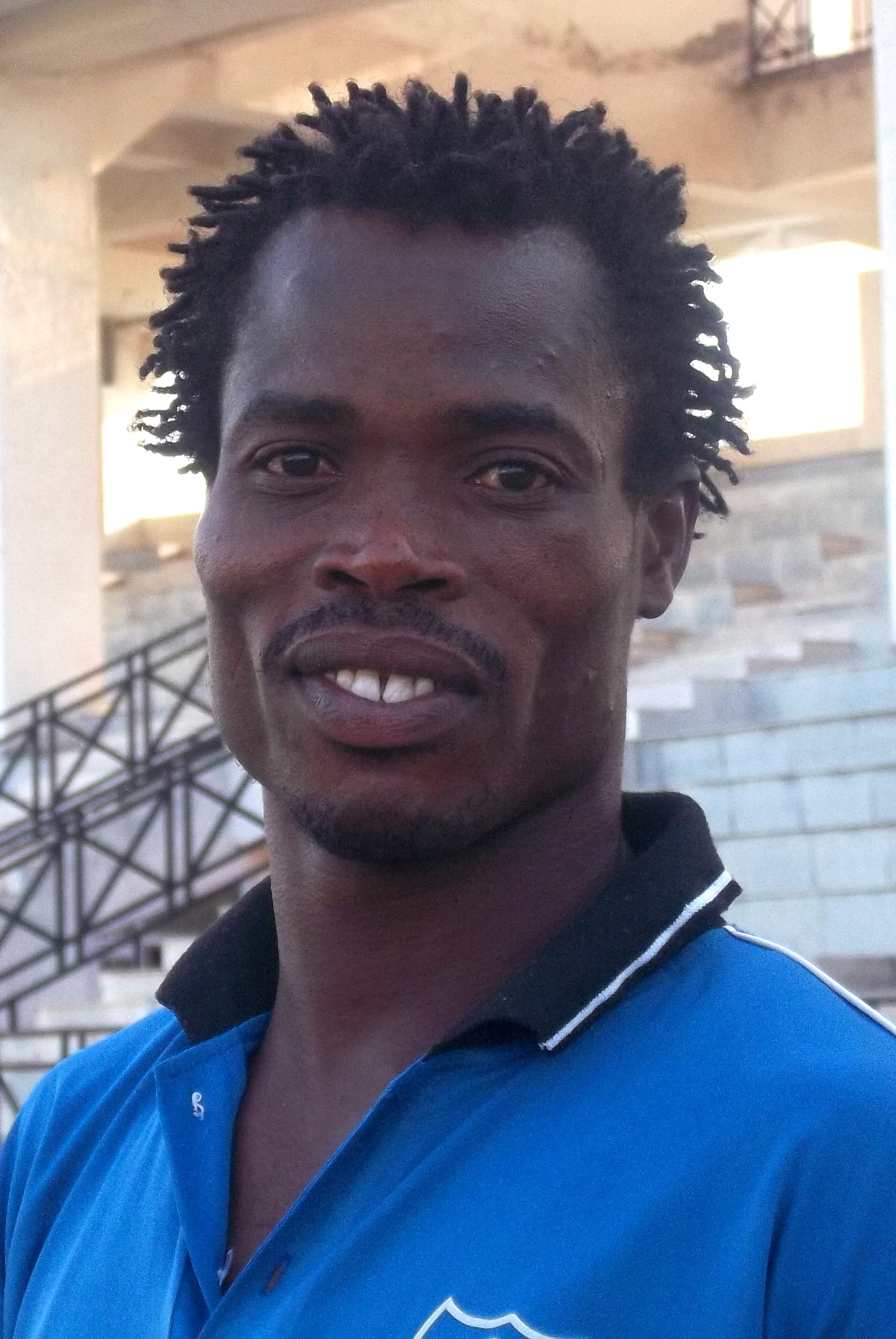

Personal information
- Date of birth: 25 September 1986 (age 40)
- Place of birth: Accra, Ghana
- Height: 1.85 m (6 ft 1 in)
- Position: Defender

Team information
- Current team: Kalighat MS

Senior career*
Years	Team	Apps	(Gls)
2006–2007	Abou Ossé F.C.		
2008–2009	Nagoya Grampus		
2009–2011	Viva Kerala	20	(1)
2011–2012	Chirag United Club Kerala	16	(2)
2012–2013	Mohammedan	3	(0)
2013–	Kalighat Milan Sangha		

International career
2006	Ghana U-23		
- * Club domestic league appearances and goals

Charles Dzisah (born 25 September 1986) is a Ghanaian footballer who plays as a defender for Indian club Kalighat Milan Sangha FC.

== Life ==
Dzisah was born 1986 in Accra of a Togolese father and a Ghanaian mother. He raised in the city of Anloga in the Volta Region, Ghana and visit in this time the Tema Senior High School. He moved than 2004 for his studies to United Kingdom and visit the University of Oxford. In late 2005 he graduated at the University of Oxford.

== Career ==
The defender returned to the land of his forefather and started his professional career in 2006 with Togolese top side Abou Ossé F.C. He played two years for the Togolese Championnat National team Abou Ossé F.C., before moved in the spring 2008 to J-League club Nagoya Grampus. After one and a half year in Japan, was on 25 July 2009 signed by I-League club Viva Kerala, who played with country man Reuben Senyo. After the takeover of Chirag Computers from his club Viva Kerala, signed on 15. October 2011 for the refounded Chirag United Club Kerala. After one year with 1Chirag United Club Kerala, joined 17. October 2012 to League rival Mohammedan Sporting Club.

=== Mohammedan Sporting ===
In the I-League 2nd Division 2013, he scored the goal in the opening match of Group B on the 25th minutes, helping his side to a 2–1 win over Royal Wahingdoh F.C., on 9 March at Indore.

=== Kalighat Milan Sangha ===
He has already scored 7 goals for the Kalighat Milan Sangha in the Calcutta Premier Division 2013.

== Career statistics ==
As of 5 May 2012

Club	Season	League			Cup			International			Total		
Club	Season	Apps	Goals	Assists	Apps	Goals	Assists	Apps	Goals	Assists	Apps	Goals	Assists
Chirag United Kerala	2010–11	20	1	0	1	0	0	-	-	-	21	1	0
Chirag United Kerala	2011–12	16	2	0	0	0	0	-	-	-	16	2	0
Chirag United Kerala	Career total	36	3	0	1	0	0	0	0	0	37	3	0

== International career ==
In May 2006, he made his debut for the Ghana national under-23 football team and was part of the squad until 2007.
