= Stephen Barretto =

Indian footballer

Personal information
- Date of birth: 2 March 1989 (age 37)
- Place of birth: Goa, India
- Height: 1.70 m (5 ft 7 in)
- Position: Midfielder

Team information
- Current team: Sporting Goa
- Number: 38

Senior career*
Years	Team	Apps	(Gls)
2012–	Sporting Goa	19	(0)
- * Club domestic league appearances and goals as of 28 April 2014

Stephen Barretto (born 2 March 1989 in Goa) is an Indian footballer who plays as a midfielder for Sporting Clube de Goa in the I-League.

== Career ==
=== Sporting Goa ===
Stephen made his debut for Sporting Goa in the I-League on 18 October 2012 against Dempo S.C. at the Fatorda Stadium and in which Sporting Goa lost 5–0 and Stephen came on as a substitute in 81st minute.

== Career statistics ==
=== Club ===
As of 28 April 2014

Club	Season	League		Federation Cup		Durand Cup		AFC		Total	
Club	Season	Apps	Goals	Apps	Goals	Apps	Goals	Apps	Goals	Apps	Goals
Sporting Goa	2012–13	17	0	0	0	0	0	—	17	0	
2013-14	2	0	1	0	0	0	-	-	3	0	
Career total		19	0	1	0	0	0	0	0	20	0
