= Reuben Senyo =

Ghanaian footballer

Personal information
- Date of birth: 26 November 1986 (age 39)
- Place of birth: Ghana
- Position: Striker

Senior career*
Years	Team	Apps	(Gls)
- Bofoakwa Tano F.C.
- Accra Hearts of Oak S.C.
2007–2008	Maccabi Netanya (trial)		
2009–2010	Viva Kerala		(6)
- * Club domestic league appearances and goals

Reuben Senyo (born 26 November 1986 in Ghana) is a Ghanaian retired footballer.

== India ==
An addition to Viva Kerala in advance of the 2009–10 I-League, Senyo stated that the atmosphere in Indian football was convivial and was predicted to have a great impact on Kerala. Burying two goals to come out on top over Sporting Clube de Goa 4–2 late 2009, he also got the winner to scrape past JCT 1–0 mid-January 2010.
