= Beevan D'Mello =

Indian footballer

Personal information
- Date of birth: 15 January 1987 (age 39)
- Place of birth: Raia, Goa, India
- Height: 1.75 m (5 ft 9 in)
- Positions: Attacking midfielder; winger

Team information
- Current team: Dempo Sports Club
- Number: 7

Youth career
- Vasco

Senior career*
Years	Team	Apps	(Gls)
2004–2013	Salgaocar	45	(19)
2013–2015	Sporting Goa	21	(6)
2015–	Dempo	25	(13)
- * Club domestic league appearances and goals as of 19 November 2015

Beevan D'Mello (born 15 January 1987) is an Indian footballer who plays for Dempo.

== Career ==
=== Early career ===
Raia based D'Mello was a part of Goa's successful Santosh Trophy winning team in 2009. He was with Salgaocar for ten years and before that started his youth career with Vasco.

D'Mello attended Deepvihar High School in Vasco da Gama and wanted to follow in the footsteps of his idol Bruno Coutinho. This dream turned into a reality in 2003 when he signed for Salgaocar and later represented Goa.

=== Salgaocar ===
D'Mello started his football career with Salgaocar S.C. in the I-League and scored his first goal for Salgaocar on 25 October 2009 against Sporting Clube de Goa.

In 2010, D'Mello suffered a serious cruciate ligament injury which saw him out on the sidelines for a long period.

=== Sporting Goa ===
D'mello signed to Sporting Clube de Goa in June 2013. He made his debut on 7 December 2013 against Dempo S.C. at the Fatorda Stadium in which he came on as a substitute for Rojen Singh in the 89th minute as Sporting Goa won the match 1–0.
