= Rojen Singh Singam =

Indian footballer

Rojen Singh
Personal information
- Full name: Rojen Singh Singam
- Date of birth: 20 March 1988 (age 38)
- Place of birth: Manipur, India
- Height: 1.73 m (5 ft 8 in)
- Position: Defender

Team information
- Current team: Sporting Goa
- Number: 18

Senior career*
| Years | Team | Apps | (Gls) |
| 2011– | Sporting Goa | 34 | (1) |
- * Club domestic league appearances and goals as of 30 May 2015

Rojen Singh Singam (Meitei: Singam Rojen Singh, born 20 March 1988) is an Indian footballer who plays as a defender for Sporting Clube de Goa in the I-League.
