= Henry Ezeh =

Nigerian footballer (born 1991)

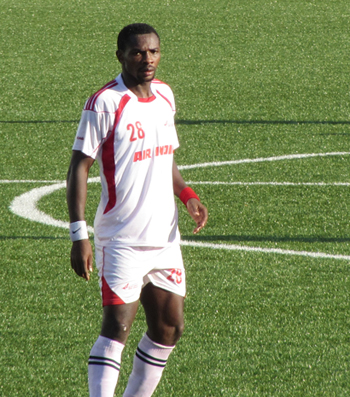
- Ezeh with Air India in 2011

Personal information
- Full name: Nna Ezeh Henry
- Date of birth: 28 November 1991 (age 34)
- Place of birth: Nigeria
- Position: Forward

Youth career
- 2007: State Bank of Travancore

Senior career*
Years	Team	Apps	(Gls)
2009–2010	JCT Mills	13	(10)
2010–2011	Mumbai	32	(24)
2011–2013	Air India	28	(16)
2013–2016	ONGC FC	NA	(14)
2014–2015	→ Mumbai FC (loan)	7	(4)
2016	DIVINE P FC	8	(5)
2017–2018	Feriköy	12	(7)
2018	Arafat FC		
2018	Real Kashmir		
2018–2019	Vasco SC		
2022	Peerless SC		
- * Club domestic league appearances and goals

Nna Ezeh Henry (born 28 November 1991) is a Nigerian footballer who plays as a forward.

== Career ==
=== JCT Mills ===
After spending part of his youth career with the State Bank of Travancore in 2007 Ezeh signed for JCT Mills FC of the I-League in 2009. He scored his first goal for the club on 10 March 2010 against Salgaocar in which he found the net in the 48th minute through a header as JCT drew the match 1–1. Ezeh scored a hat-trick against Viva Kerala on 17 April 2010 as JCT won 5–1. Ezeh scored the match-winning goal when JCT won 1–0 against Chirag United on 17 April 2010. Ezeh scored his final goal of the season on 27 May 2010 against Mahindra United in what was Mahindra's final game in their history, however it was not enough as JCT lost 2–1.

=== Mumbai ===
On 4 September 2010, it was confirmed that Ezeh had signed with Mumbai F.C. who also play in the I-League. He scored his first goal for Mumbai on 3 December 2010 in their 2–1 victory over Air India FC. His next goal was scored 1–1 draw against East Bengal on 4 January 2011. Ezeh scored another goal against East Bengal on 6 March 2011 as Mumbai won 2–1. His final goal for the club was scored in the next match against Churchill Brothers in the 78th minute, when Mumbai lost the match 3–1.

=== Air India ===
After one season with Mumbai Ezeh signed for Air India FC in the summer of 2011. Ezeh scored his first goal for the club in the league on 20 November 2011 against HAL SC as the club went on to win 4–2. His second goal for Air India was scored on 14 December 2011 against Sporting Goa in which he scored late in the game ensure a 3–1 victory for. In Air India 2–0 victory against Pailan Arrows on 23 December 2011, Ezeh scored his third goal of the season. He then continued his good form with his fifth goal of the season against East Bengal on 2 January 2012 in which he found the net in the 51st minute to tie the score at 1–1 before East Bengal scored the winner in the 74th minute through Ezeh's former teammate Penn Orji as Air India lost 2–1. Ezeh scored his sixth goal of the season against Pune on 22 January 2012 in which he found the net in the 14th minute as Air India went on to draw the match 2–2. Ezeh scored his last goal of the season on 5 February 2012 against HAL when Air India won 2–1.

Ezeh signed an extra-year extension to his contract at Air India for the 2012–13 season and he showed why he earned his contract on 11 October 2012 against Pailan Arrows in which he scored in the 67th minute to tie the score at 1–1 before Milan Singh won the game for Arrows two minutes later as Air India lost the match 2–1. Then on 9 December 2012 Ezeh managed to wreak havoc against his former club, Mumbai, as he managed to score against them in the 36th minute as Air India won convincingly 4–1 against the Mumbai club. Ezeh then scored again on 12 January 2013 against Pailan Arrows in which Ezeh scored the goal to give Air India a 1–0 lead in the 37th minute before Pailan Arrows equalised in the 45th minute as the match ended 1–1.

=== Feriköy S.K. ===
Ezeh joined Feriköy S.K. for 2017/18 season, He played 12 matches and scored 7 goals with 5 assists.

=== Peerless SC ===
Ezeh signed his new contract with Peerless SC in 2022.

== See also ==
- Nigerian expatriate footballers in India
