= Jonychand Singh Thounaojam =

Indian footballer (born 1993)

Jonychand Singh
Personal information
- Full name: Jonychand Singh Thounaojam
- Date of birth: 8 February 1993 (age 33)
- Place of birth: Manipur, India
- Position: Midfielder

Team information
- Current team: Neroca FC
- Number: 25

Senior career*
Years	Team	Apps	(Gls)
2012	Air India	7	(0)
- Peerless
- Pride Sports
2021–	NEROCA	16	(0)

International career
2009–2011	India U19	5	(1)
- * Club domestic league appearances and goals

Jonychand Singh Thounaojam (Meitei: Thounaojam Jonychand Singh, born 8 February 1993) is an Indian footballer who plays as a midfielder for NEROCA.

== Career ==
=== Air India ===
Singh made his first-team debut for Air India FC in the I-League on 24 November 2012 against reigning champions Dempo S.C. coming on as a 92nd-minute substitute for Souvik Chakraborty in a match that Air India lost 1–0.

== International ==
Singh has played for India at the under-19 level starting with the 2010 AFC U-19 qualifiers where he made his debut against Oman's under-19s on 10 November 2009 coming on as a 58th-minute substitute for Lalrindika Ralte. He then scored his first goal at the under-19 level almost two years later on 8 November 2011 against Pakistan during the 2012 AFC U-19 qualifiers in which he scored in the 53rd minute to give India's under-19s a consolation as they lost 2–1 to their biggest rivals.

== Career statistics ==
=== Club ===
Statistics accurate as of 12 May 2013

Club	Season	League		Federation Cup		Durand Cup		AFC		Total	
Club	Season	Apps	Goals	Apps	Goals	Apps	Goals	Apps	Goals	Apps	Goals
Air India	2012–13	7	0	0	0	—	—	—	—	7	0
Career total		7	0	0	0	0	0	0	0	7	0
