= Ashley Fernandes =

Indian footballer (born 1987)

Personal information
- Full name: Ashley Fernandes
- Date of birth: 14 July 1987 (age 39)
- Place of birth: Goa, India
- Height: 1.75 m (5 ft 9 in)
- Position: Midfielder

Team information
- Current team: Churchill Brothers
- Number: 31

Senior career*
Years	Team	Apps	(Gls)
- Churchill Brothers
2013–	Churchill Brothers	7	(0)
- * Club domestic league appearances and goals

Ashley Fernandes (born 14 July 1987 in Goa) is an Indian footballer who plays as a midfielder for Churchill Brothers S.C. in the I-League.

== Career ==
=== Churchill Brothers ===
Fernandes made his debut for Churchill Brothers S.C. on 10 December 2012 during an I-League match against Pailan Arrows at the Salt Lake Stadium in Kolkata, West Bengal in which he came on as an injury time substitute for Lenny Rodrigues; Churchill Brothers won the match 0–3.

== Career statistics ==
=== Club ===
Statistics accurate as of 12 May 2013

Club	Season	League		Federation Cup		Durand Cup		AFC		Total	
Club	Season	Apps	Goals	Apps	Goals	Apps	Goals	Apps	Goals	Apps	Goals
Churchill Brothers	2012–13	7	0	0	0	0	0	4	0	11	0
Career total		7	0	0	0	0	0	4	0	11	0
