= Micky Fernandes =

Indian footballer and manager

Personal information
- Date of birth: 20 August 1983 (age 43)
- Place of birth: Goa, India
- Height: 1.79 m (5 ft 10 in)
- Position: Midfielder

Senior career*
| Years | Team | Apps | (Gls) |
| 2003–2007 | Salgaocar | | |
| 2007–2009 | Sporting Goa | | |
| 2009–2010 | Mohun Bagan | | |
| 2010–2012 | Dempo | | |
| 2012–2013 | Air India | 22 | (2) |
| 2013–2015 | Churchill Brothers | 10 | (0) |

International career
| 2006 | India | 1 | (0) |

Managerial career
- 2018–2022: Vasco SC
- 2023: Wari AC
- * Club domestic league appearances and goals

Micky Fernandes (born 20 August 1983) is an Indian former professional footballer who played as a midfielder.

== Club career ==
Fernandes started his professional career with Salgaocar of the National Football League in 2003 and stayed at the club till 2007. From Salgaocar, Fernandes joined Sporting Clube de Goa where he stayed till 2009. From there, he joined Mohun Bagan, where he stayed for one season before joining Dempo S.C. in 2010 on a two-year contract.

=== Mumbai ===
After spending two years at Dempo, during which Fernandes was used as a player in the Goa Professional League and in three AFC Cup matches in 2011, he signed for Mumbai F.C. of the I-League on 7 June 2012.

=== Air India ===
Fernandes made his debut for Air India F.C. on 20 September 2012 during a Federation Cup match against Mohammedan at the Kanchenjunga Stadium in Siliguri, West Bengal, starting the match. Air India lost the match 0–1.

=== Churchill Brothers ===
Fernandes made his debut for Churchill Brothers in the I-League on 21 September 2013 against Salgaocar at the Duler Stadium, coming on as a substitute for Alesh Sawant in the 65th minute. Churchill Brothers lost the match 1–0.

== International career ==
Fernandes has played one game for the India national football team in 2006.

== Coaching career ==
=== Vasco ===
Fernandes was appointed head coach of Vasco S.C. on 2 August 2018.

== Managerial statistics ==
| Team | From | To | Record | | | | |
| Team | From | To | G | W | D | L | Win % |
|---|---|---|---|---|---|---|---|
| Vasco | 2 August 2018 | 2022 | 22 | 7 | 6 | 9 | 31.82 |
| Total | | | 22 | 7 | 6 | 9 | 31.82 |
