= Jaison Vales =

Indian footballer

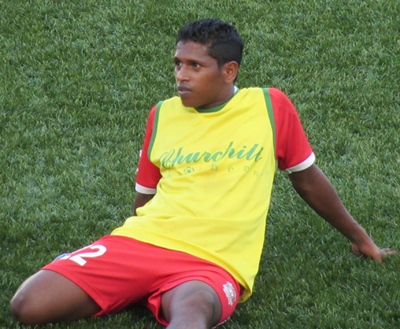
- Vales with Churchill Brothers in 2011

Personal information
- Date of birth: 4 September 1988 (age 38)
- Place of birth: Goa, India
- Height: 1.76 m (5 ft 9 1/2 in)
- Position: Winger

Team information
- Current team: Mohun Bagan

Senior career*
Years	Team	Apps	(Gls)
2009–2014	Churchill Brothers	29	(5)
2014	Chennaiyin FC	0	(0)
2014–	Salgaocar	10	(1)
2015–	Mohun Bagan		
- * Club domestic league appearances and goals as of 10:00, 18 July 2015 (UTC)

Jaison Vales (born 4 September 1988) is a Goan footballer who plays as winger for Salgaocar in the I-League.

== Career ==
=== Churchill Brothers ===
Vales started his footballing career in 2009 with Churchill Brothers but during the 2009–10 season he was mainly used in the Federation Cup and IFA Shield. His best accomplishment was the 2009 IFA Shield which he won with Churchill Brothers S.C.
