= Abdelhamid Shabana =

Egyptian footballer (born 1985)

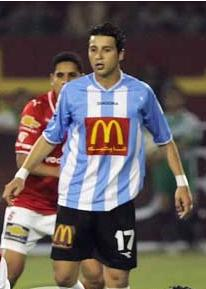
- Shabana VS Ahly

Personal information
- Date of birth: 2 October 1985 (age 41)
- Place of birth: Monufia, Egypt
- Height: 1.80 m (5 ft 11 in)
- Position: Attacking midfielder

Team information
- Current team: Ismaily
- Number: 23

Youth career
- Menouf

Senior career*
Years	Team	Apps	(Gls)
2005–2010	Ghazl El-Mahalla	95	(5)
2010–2013	Al-Ahly	10	(2)
2011–2013	→ Telephonat Bani Sweif (loan)	7	(0)
2013–2014	Churchill Brothers	23	(6)
2014–2015	Ismaily	12	
2015–	Ala'ab Damanhour		

International career^{‡}
2005	Egypt U20		
2007	Egypt U23	12	(0)
- * Club domestic league appearances and goals as of 05:00, 7 April 2014 (UTC) ‡ National team caps and goals as of 1 June 2012

Abdelhameed Shabana (Arabic: Abd elhamed mostafa shapana; born 2 October 1985) is an Egyptian footballer who is currently a free agent. He is an electrifying attacking midfielder, who can also play as a striker or a winger.

Abdelhameed Shabana is well known for crashing the top clubs of Egypt with his famous goals against Zamalek, Al-Ahly and Ismaily.

== International career ==
He has been a regular international for the Egypt U20 and Egypt U23 team, and played in the African Games qualifiers, as well as winning the Qatar U23 Cup.

== Club statistics ==
As of 29 April 2014

Club	Season	League			Cup		Other		Total	
Club	Season	Division	Apps	Goals	Apps	Goals	Apps	Goals	Apps	Goals
Churchill Brothers	2013-14	I-League	13	2	5	3	5	1	23	6
Churchill Brothers	Total		13	2	5	3	5	1	23	6

== Honors ==
=== with Al-Ahly ===
- Egyptian Premier League (2010–2011)

=== with Churchill Brothers ===
- Federation Cup (2014)
