= Seikhohau Tuboi =

Indian footballer

Seikhohao Tuboi
Personal information
- Date of birth: 15 February 1989 (age 37)
- Place of birth: Imphal, Manipur, India
- Height: 1.67 m (5 ft 5 1/2 in)
- Position: Forward

Team information
- Current team: F.C. Zalen

Senior career*
Years	Team	Apps	(Gls)
2008–2014	Shillong Lajong FC	67	(16)
2014–	F.C. Zalen	50	(28)
- * Club domestic league appearances and goals

Seikhohau Tuboi (born 1989) is an Indian football player. He played for Shillong Lajong FC in the I-League as a striker. Currently he plays for Manipur-based F.C. Zalen.
