= Asim Hassan =

Indian former footballer (born 1986)

Personal information
- Full name: Asim Hassan
- Date of birth: 19 November 1986 (age 39)
- Place of birth: Malerkotla, Punjab
- Height: 1.75 m (5 ft 9 in)
- Position: Midfielder

Team information
- Current team: Mumbay (assistant)

Youth career
- 2002–2006: Mahilpur FA

Senior career*
| Years | Team | Apps | (Gls) |
| 2007–08 | JCT | | |
| 2008–2013 | Pune | 48 | (4) |
| 2013 | Vasco (loan) | 5 | (2) |
| 2013–2014 | ONGC | | |
- * Club domestic league appearances and goals

Sayed Asim Hassan (born 19 November 1986 in Malerkotla, Punjab) is an Indian former professional football player who played as a midfielder.

== Career ==
=== Mahilpur FA ===
He joined the Mahilpur Football Academy under-19 batch and honed his game there for around three years.

=== JCT ===
The next step was the JCT Academy, and couple of years later he joined the JCT senior team for 2007–08 I-League.

=== Pune ===
In the 2008 season, Asim joined Pune FC. His biggest moment came during a crucial Pune FC match against SESA F.A. in a 2009 I-League 2nd Division encounter.
