= Parwinder Singh =

Indian footballer

Personal information
- Full name: Parwinder Singh
- Date of birth: 7 August 1985 (age 41)
- Place of birth: Jalandhar, Punjab, India
- Position: Defender

Youth career
- Tata FA

Senior career*
Years	Team	Apps	(Gls)
2006–2009	Sporting Goa		
2010–2015	ONGC		

International career
2006	India U20	4	(0)
- * Club domestic league appearances and goals as of 07:11, 3 September 2020 (UTC)

Parwinder Singh (born 7 August 1985) is a former Indian professional footballer who played as a defender. During his career, he played in the I-League for both Sporting Goa and ONGC.

== Club career ==
Born in Jalandhar, Punjab, Parwinder began his career with the Tata Football Academy based in Jamshedpur and graduated from the academy in 2006. After graduating, he signed with National Football League side Sporting Goa. He scored his first goal for the club on 26 November 2008 in a 1–0 victory over Churchill Brothers in the Goa Professional League and then his second a round later on 5 January 2009 against Dempo. Parwinder stayed with the club until the end of the 2008–09 season.

In 2010, Parwinder signed with I-League 2nd Division and MDFA Elite Division side ONGC. In April 2012, he was part of the ONGC side that finished as champions during the 2012 season and thus earned promotion to the I-League. In October 2012 it was announced that Parwinder would be retained by the club for their I-League campaign. He made his professional debut for ONGC in the league on 10 February 2013 against United Sikkim. He started and played the whole match as it ended 0–0.

On 19 September 2013, Parwinder was part of the ONGC side that took on Mohammedan in the Durand Cup final. His performance earned praise despite his side losing 2–1. After the club were relegated from the I-League, Parwinder continued playing with ONGC in the MDFA Elite Division in 2015.

== International career ==
In March 2006 it was announced that Parwinder had been selected to join the India under-20 side for the 2006 AFC Challenge Cup. He started in India's first match of the tournament against Afghanistan on 1 April. The match ended 2–0 in favor of India.
