= Arturo Navarro =

Spanish footballer (born 1989)

Personal information
- Full name: Arturo Navarro García
- Date of birth: 14 March 1989 (age 37)
- Place of birth: Castellón, Spain
- Height: 1.83 m (6 ft 0 in)
- Position: Centre back

Team information
- Current team: Atlético Saguntino

Youth career
- Roda
- Castellón
- 2006–2007: Valencia

Senior career*
Years	Team	Apps	(Gls)
2007–2010	Valencia B	63	(0)
2008	Valencia	0	(0)
2010–2011	Ontinyent	24	(1)
2011–2012	Osasuna B	33	(1)
2012–2013	Guijuelo	26	(1)
2013–2014	Sporting Goa	13	(0)
2015	Arroyo	11	(0)
2015–2016	Arrandina	15	(2)
2016–2017	Castellón	23	(5)
2017	Atlético Saguntino	9	(0)
2017–2018	Castellón	25	(1)
2018–	Atlético Saguntino	0	(0)
- * Club domestic league appearances and goals as of 24 June 2018

Arturo Navarro García (born 14 March 1989) is a Spanish footballer who plays for Atlético Saguntino as a central defender.

== Club career ==
Born in Castellón de la Plana, Valencian Community, Arturo graduated with Valencia CF's youth setup, and made his senior debuts with the reserves in the 2007–08 campaign, in Tercera División. On 12 November 2008 he made his first team debut, starting in a 3–0 Copa del Rey home win against Club Portugalete.

In the 2010 summer Arturo left the Che, and signed for Ontinyent CF in Segunda División B. In July of the following year he moved to another reserve team, CA Osasuna B in the same division.

On 1 September 2012 Arturo joined CD Guijuelo, also in the third tier. On 16 August of the following year he moved abroad for the first time in his career, signing for Indian I-League side Sporting Clube de Goa.

Arturo made his professional debut for the side on 21 September 2013, playing the full 90 minutes in a 1–1 home draw against Mumbai FC. In January of the following year, after suffering a knee injury, he was released.

On 7 January 2015 Arturo returned to Spain and its third division, after agreeing to a deal with Arroyo CP. On 23 July he moved to fellow league team Arandina CF.

== Career statistics ==
As of 2 May 2018

Club	Season	League			Cup		Other		Total	
Club	Season	Division	Apps	Goals	Apps	Goals	Apps	Goals	Apps	Goals
Valencia B	2007–08	Tercera División	19	0	—				19	0
Valencia B	2008–09	Segunda División B	24	0	—				24	0
Valencia B	2009–10	Segunda División B	20	0	—				20	0
Valencia B	Total		63	0	–				63	0
Valencia	2008–09	La Liga	0	0	1	0	0	0	1	0
Ontinyent	2010–11	Segunda División B	24	1	0	0	—		24	1
Osasuna B	2011–12	Segunda División B	33	1	—				33	1
Guijuelo	2012–13	Segunda División B	26	1	—				26	1
Sporting Goa	2013–14	I-League	13	0	6	2	—		19	2
Arroyo	2014–15	Segunda División B	11	0	—				11	0
Arandina	2015–16	Segunda División B	15	2	2	0	—		17	2
Castellón	2015–16	Tercera División	14	3	0	0	6	1	20	4
Castellón	2016–17	Tercera División	9	2	0	0	—		9	2
Castellón	Total		23	5	0	0	6	1	29	6
Atlético Saguntino	2016–17	Segunda División B	9	0	0	0	—		9	0
Castellón	2017–18	Tercera División	25	1	0	0	5	0	30	1
Career total			242	11	9	2	11	1	263	14
