= Rakesh Masih =

Indian footballer (born 1987)

Personal information
- Full name: Rakesh Masih
- Date of birth: 18 March 1987 (age 39)
- Place of birth: Bulewal, Gurdaspur, Punjab, India
- Height: 1.86 m (6 ft 1 in)
- Position: Defender

Team information
- Current team: Tollygunge Agragami

Senior career*
Years	Team	Apps	(Gls)
2004–2008	Tata Football Academy	76	(6)
2008–2013	Mohun Bagan A.C	176	(27)
2013	Salgaocar	11	(6)
2013–2014	Mohammedan S.C (loan)	25	(3)
2014	Atletico de Kolkata	9	(0)
2015	East Bengal Club		(0)
2018	Tollygunge Agragami	26	(4)

International career
2005–2013	India	36	(8)
- * Club domestic league appearances and goals

Rakesh Masih (born 18 March 1987) is an Indian footballer who played as a defender for the India national team.

== Career ==
Masih spent four years at the Tata Football Academy and was regarded as one of the best cadets of his batch. While at the TFA, Masih earned a call up to the India Under-23 side in 2007 and played in the 2008 Olympic qualifiers. In 2008, he signed for the Kolkata giants Mohun Bagan and had a wonderful season.

The Punjab born player can play both as a central defender and in central midfield because of his strong build and good heading ability. Then-Mohun Bagan coach Karim Bencherifa used him in central midfield alongside the experienced Marcos Pereira and the two formed one of the best central midfield partnerships in the 2008–09 I-League campaign. Masih was instrumental in Bagan's record breaking ten match winning run in the league and the Federation Cup triumph that season.

In January 2009, Masih made his international debut in the 2–1 defeat against Hong Kong and since then he has been a regular member of the Indian squad. Masih's performances in the 2008–09 season won him nominations for the "Best Young Player" and "Best Player Of The Year (Fans' Choice)" categories in the inaugural edition of the FPAI Awards in 2009.

Last season, he was troubled with a number of injuries and thus could not feature regularly for Mohun Bagan in the I-League. He returned in the second half of the season but never regained his best form and Mohun Bagan struggled.

=== Mohammedan (loan) ===
Masih signed for Mohammedan on loan from Salgaocar F.C. and made his debut in the I-league on 20 October 2013 at the Bangalore Football Stadium against Bengaluru FC. He played the whole match, which Mohammedan lost 2–1.
