= Alesh Sawant =

Indian footballer

Personal information
- Date of birth: 27 November 1994 (age 31)
- Place of birth: India
- Height: 1.72 m (5 ft 7 1/2 in)
- Position: Midfielder

Team information
- Current team: Churchill Brothers
- Number: 21

Youth career
- Brasil Futebol Academia
- 2012–2013: Churchill Brothers

Senior career*
Years	Team	Apps	(Gls)
2013–	Churchill Brothers	13	(0)
2015–	→ Salgaocar (loan)	1	(0)
- * Club domestic league appearances and goals as of 14 June 2014

Alesh Sawant (born 27 November 1994) is an Indian professional footballer who plays as a midfielder for Churchill Brothers S.C. in the I-League.

== Career ==
=== Churchill Brothers ===
Sawant joined Churchill Brothers S.C. as a youth player from Brasil Futebol Academia in 2012. Sawant then made his professional debut for the first-team on 21 September 2013 in the I-League season opener against Salgaocar F.C. at the Duler Stadium in which he started and played 65 minutes before being replaced by Micky Fernandes as Churchill Brothers lost the match 0–1.

== Career statistics ==
As of 14 June 2014

Club	Season	League			Federation Cup		Durand Cup		AFC		Total	
Club	Season	Division	Apps	Goals	Apps	Goals	Apps	Goals	Apps	Goals	Apps	Goals
Churchill Brothers	2013–14	I-League	13	0	0	0	—	—	5	1	18	1
Churchill Brothers	Career total		13	0	0	0	0	0	5	1	18	1

== Honour ==
India U20 (Goa India)

- Lusofonia Games Gold medal: 2014
