= Beto (footballer, born 1979) =

Brazilian footballer

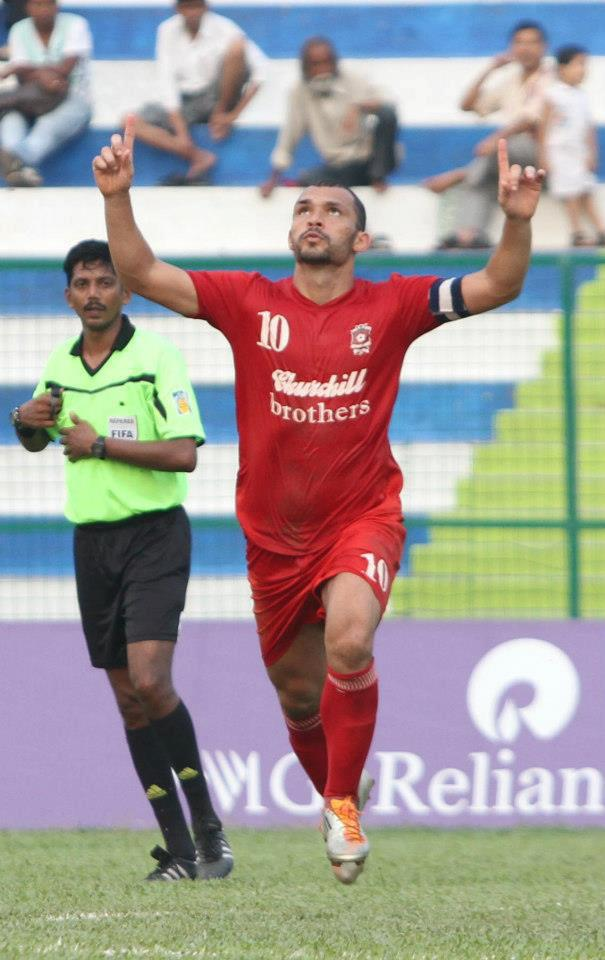
- Beto after scoring for Churchill Brothers in 2011

Personal information
- Full name: Roberto Mendes da Silva
- Date of birth: 14 September 1978 (age 48)
- Place of birth: São Paulo, Brazil
- Height: 1.80 m (5 ft 11 in)
- Position: Midfielder

Senior career*
Years	Team	Apps	(Gls)
2000–2001	Campaiorense	8	(0)
2004–2005	Mohun Bagan	24	(23)
2005–2011	Dempo	76	(27)
2011–2013	Churchill Brothers	35	
2013–2014	Dempo		(35)
- * Club domestic league appearances and goals as of 16:32, 20 May 2014 (UTC)

Roberto Mendes da Silva, known simply as Beto is a retired Brazilian professional footballer, who spent most of his football career in Indian club football.

== Career ==
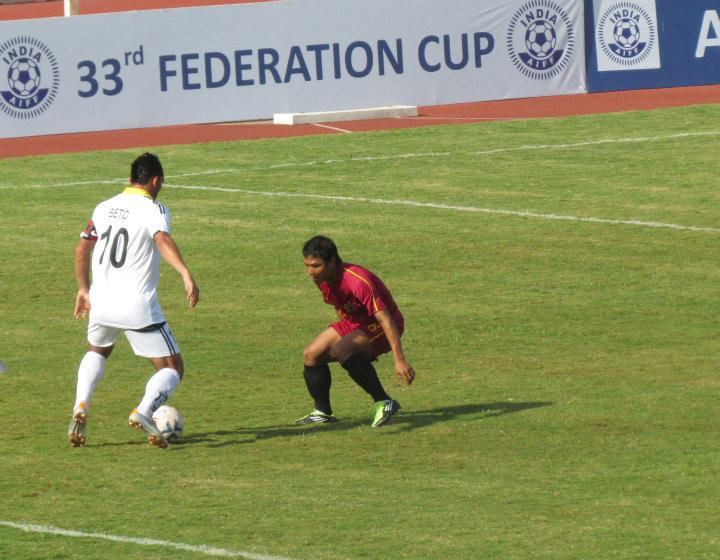
Beto (No 10) in action with Churchill Brothers in Federation Cup.

After spending six seasons with Dempo, Beto switched to Churchill Brothers in 2011. After winning the I-League with Churchill brothers, he switched back to Dempo in the summer of 2013.

He has scored a total of 12 goals for Dempo SC in AFC Cup, the continental club tournament.

== Personal life ==
Beto formed the Brasil Futebol Academia in 2009 with Jose Ramirez Barreto. He has two daughters.

== Honours ==
Dempo

- I-League: 2006–07, 2007–08, 2009-10
- Durand Cup: 2006
- Goa Professional League: 2007, 2009, 2010

Churchill Brothers

- I-League: 2012–13
- Durand Cup: 2011

Individual

- FPAI Foreign Player of the Year: 2010–11
