= Collin Abranches =

Indian footballer (born 1991)

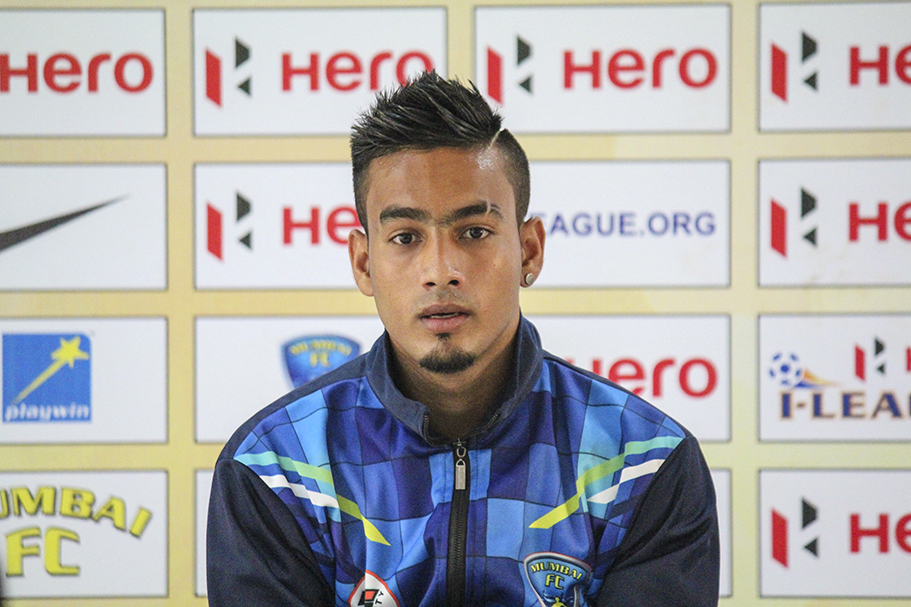

Personal information
- Full name: Collin Abranches
- Date of birth: 12 December 1991 (age 34)
- Place of birth: Mumbai, Maharashtra, India
- Height: 5 ft 3 in (1.60 m)
- Position: Defender

Senior career*
Years	Team	Apps	(Gls)
2011–2012	Air India		
2012–2013	Salgaocar	15	(0)
2013–2014	Mohammedan	16	(0)
2015	Mumbai	4	(0)
2016	Ozone		
2017–2018	Bengaluru	0	(0)
2018–2019	Gokulam Kerala	0	(0)
- * Club domestic league appearances and goals

Collin Abranches (born 12 December 1991) is an Indian professional footballer who last played as a defender for I-League side Gokulam Kerala.

== Career ==
=== Air India ===
In early 2011 Collin signed for local Mumbai club Air India FC who play in the national I-League. On 9 January 2011, Collin played and scored in his first ever professional match for Air India in an I-League match against HAL. He then scored his second career goal against Dempo on 18 December 2011.

=== Salgaocar ===
Abranches made his debut for Salgaocar F.C. on 22 September 2012 during a Federation Cup match against United Sikkim F.C. at the JRD Tata Sports Complex in Jamshedpur, Jharkhand; Salgaocar won the match 0–3.

=== Mohammedan ===
On 31 May 2013, it was confirmed that Abranches had signed for Mohammedan along with Sandeep Sangha. He made his debut for Mohammedan in the I-League on 21 September 2013 against Pune F.C. at the Salt Lake Stadium and played the whole match; as Mohammedan lost the match 1–3.

=== Mumbai FC ===
On 16 September 2014, Mumbai FC announced that they have signed Collin Abranches.

=== Ozone FC ===
In July 2016, Abranches joined Bengaluru based I-League 2nd Division club Ozone. He played all the 6 preliminary round matches of 2016–17 I-League 2nd Division. However, the club failed to progress to the final round of the league and finished third in their group.

=== Bengaluru FC ===
On 24 July 2017, Abranches was drafted by Indian Super League debutants Bengaluru FC. After being an unused substitute for both the legs of the club's AFC Cup matches against 4.25 Sports Club of North Korea, he made his debut in the same tournament, starting in a 1–0 defeat against Tajik club Istiklol. On 8 July 2018 Bengaluru FC released him along with four other players.

== Career statistics ==
=== Club ===
Statistics accurate as of 17 May 2015

Club	Season	League			Cup			AFC			Total		
Club	Season	Apps	Goals	Assists	Apps	Goals	Assists	Apps	Goals	Assists	Apps	Goals	Assists
Air India	2010–11	23	1	3	3	0	0	—	—	—	26	1	3
Air India	2011–12	25	1	5	3	0	0	—	—	—	28	1	5
Salgaocar	2012-13	22	1	2	4	0	0	—	—	—	26	1	2
Mohammedan	2013-14	20	1	7	10	0	0	—	—	—	30	1	7
Mumbai FC	2014-15	4	0	0	4	0	0	—	—	—	8	0	0
Bengaluru FC	2017-18	3	0	0	0	0	0	1	0	0	1	0	0
Career total		94	4	17	24	0	0	1	0	0	119	4	17
