= Victorino Fernandes =

Indian footballer

Personal information
- Full name: Victorino Fernandes
- Date of birth: 3 February 1989 (age 37)
- Place of birth: Goa, India
- Height: 1.67 m (5 ft 5 1/2 in)
- Position: Forward

Team information
- Current team: Sporting Goa

Youth career
- 2006: Assolda–Chandor
- 2006–2010: Salgaocar

Senior career*
Years	Team	Apps	(Gls)
2010–2017	Sporting Goa		
2015	→ Goa (loan)	3	(0)
2017	Mumbai	13	(3)
2017–	Sporting Goa		

International career^{‡}
2013–2014	India	2	(0)
- * Club domestic league appearances and goals as of 18:59, 20 March 2018 (UTC) ‡ National team caps and goals as of 18:59, 20 March 2018 (UTC)

Victorino Fernandes (born 3 February 1989) is an Indian footballer who currently plays for Sporting Clube De Goa in the Goa Professional League.

== Early career ==
Victorino started his footballing career at the age of 17 by playing for local amateur side Assolda-Chandor. However, the same year, Victorino joined local I-League side Salgaocar's youth team, where he stayed till 2010 before signing for Sporting Goa. He then got suspended by the Goa Football Association after it was found that he attempted to sign for Dempo while still contracted to Sporting Goa. While suspended Victorino played for Goa League 1st Division side Santa Cruz before finally signing for Sporting Goa officially.

== Club career ==
=== Sporting Clube de Goa ===
In June 2010, Victorino signed for Sporting Goa who were then playing in the I-League 2nd Division. After one season in the 2nd division, he helped his side gain promotion to the I-League after Sporting Goa finished as runners-up in the 2011 I-League 2nd Division.

Victorino started the 2011–12 season in the 2011–12 I-League with Sporting Goa. On 31 October 2011, he scored his first and second I-League goals against Shillong Lajong in Sporting's 4–3 victory. He then scored again on 19 November 2011, against Chirag United and then again on 23 November 2011, against Mumbai.

Fernandes helped Sporting qualify for 2014–15 Indian Federation Cup semi-finals. After trailing 1–3 against East Bengal in the last group game, Fernandes scored a hat-trick and helped the team reach semi finals. Victorino missed his teams' early I-League with injury.

=== FC Goa ===
In July 2015 Fernandes was drafted to play for FC Goa in the 2015 Indian Super League.

== International career ==
On 19 November 2013, Fernandes made his debut for the Indian team against Nepal in an International friendly match at Siliguri, West Bengal.

== Career statistics ==
=== Club ===
As of 15 January 2017

Club	Season	League			Federation Cup		Durand Cup		AFC		Total	
Club	Season	Division	Apps	Goals	Apps	Goals	Apps	Goals	Apps	Goals	Apps	Goals
Sporting Goa	2011	I-League 2nd Division	0	0	0	0	0	0	—	—	0	0
Sporting Goa	2011–12	I-League	4	3	0	0	0	0	—	—	4	3
Sporting Goa	2012–13	I-League	21	4	1	1	2	1	—	—	24	6
Sporting Goa	2013–14	I-League	16	3	5	4	0	0	—	—	21	7
Sporting Goa	2014–15	I-League	14	3	4	3	0	0	—	—	18	6
Sporting Goa	2015–16	I-League	8	2	4	0	0	0	—	—	12	2
FC Goa (loan)	2015	Indian Super League	3	0	—	—	—	—	—	—	3	0
Mumbai	2016-17	Indian Super League	2	1	—	—	—	—	—	—	2	1
Career total			68	16	14	8	2	1	—	—	84	25
