= Balwant Singh (footballer) =

Indian footballer (born 1986)

Personal information
- Date of birth: 15 December 1986 (age 39)
- Place of birth: Hoshiarpur, Punjab, India
- Height: 1.78 m (5 ft 10 in)
- Position: Forward

Youth career
- 2005–2007: Mahilpur Football Club
- 2007–2008: JCT

Senior career*
Years	Team	Apps	(Gls)
2008–2011	JCT	38	(7)
2011–2013	Salgaocar		
2013–2014	Churchill Brothers	22	(10)
2014–2017	Mohun Bagan	38	(12)
2014–2015	→ Chennaiyin (loan)	20	(1)
2017–2018	Mumbai City	16	(6)
2018–2020	ATK	23	(2)
2020–2022	East Bengal	8	(0)
2023–2024	Delhi	10	(8)

International career
2010	India U23	4	(1)
2010	India B	3	(0)
2014–2019	India	11	(3)
- * Club domestic league appearances and goals

Balwant Singh (born 15 December 1986) is an Indian professional footballer who plays as a forward.

== Club career ==
=== JCT ===
Born in Hoshiarpur, Punjab, Balwant started his footballing journey with Mahilpur Football Club before joining the academy of JCT before being promoted to their senior team in 2008. He scored his first professional goal for the club on 28 September 2008 against Mahindra United in the 64th minute to help JCT to a huge 7–1 victory. He then scored his second goal for the club on 11 October 2008 against Mohammedan in the 45th minute to help JCT to a 2–0 win. Balwant then scored his last goal of his debut season against Mumbai on 26 November 2008 in the 38th minute, but could not prevent JCT from going down 2–3. He had a productive Durand Cup campaign in his debut season, where JCT reached the semi-finals, with Balwant scoring thrice during the tournament.

He opened his account for the 2009–10 season on 4 October 2009 when he scored a brace as JCT won the match 5–1 against Shillong Lajong before scoring his third and final goal that season against Sporting Goa on 28 January 2010 in the 58th minute in a match JCT won 2–0.

Balwant was among the 6 JCT players who went for a short training stint at Wolverhampton Wanderers in England in 2010. He then scored what went on to be his final goal for JCT during the 2010–11 season against Churchill Brothers on 7 December 2010 in the 37th minute as his team drew the match 1–1.

=== Salgaocar ===
When the season ended, JCT were relegated to the I-League 2nd Division, and Balwant was picked up by goan-based Salgaocar on 8 June 2011 on a two-year deal. He made his club debut while on 21 March 2012 against Neftchi FK in the 2012 AFC Cup when he came on as a 79th-minute substitute for Francis Fernandes as his team drew the match 2–2. He then featured in his 2nd AFC Cup match against Al-Wehdat on 10 April 2012 when Salgaocar lost 1–2. Balwant struggled for the majority of his time at Salgaocar; his first season was blighted by long injury lay-offs while in the second season, he was relegated to play only the local league games in Goa and did not make any I-League appearances.

=== Churchill Brothers ===
After barely getting any playing time with Salgaocar, Balwant signed for the defending I-League champions Churchill Brothers on 9 July 2013. He made his debut for the club in the league on 5 October 2013 against Mumbai in a game in which he started and played 57 minutes in a 2–0 win. He then scored his first goal for the club five days later on 10 October 2013 against Rangdajied United in the 27th minute to equalise for Churchill Brothers as the match ended 1–1. He scored a brace for Churchill Brothers in the league on 2 November 2013 against United SC to give his team an early lead, however, that lead would not last as the club went on to lose the match 2–3. On 29 April, Balwant was named Indian player of the season for his goal-scoring feat during the season.

=== Mohun Bagan ===
Balwant was roped in by Mohun Bagan ahead of 5 other clubs who were chasing his signature due to his 17-goal exploits the previous season for the 2014–15 season on a one-year deal. he would appear 17 times for Bagan in their title winning campaign scoring times, and 4 times in the Federation Cup.

=== Chennaiyin ===
Balwant was loaned out to south Indian franchise Chennaiyin for the inaugural season of the Indian Super League by his club Mohun Bagan. On 15 October 2014, he opened the score as Chennaiyin won 2–1 at Goa in their first Indian Super League match, thus becoming the first Indian to score in the league. Balwant would appear 14 times for the Marco Materazzi managed outfit, helping them reach the semi-finals, where they were beaten over two-legs by southern rivals Kerala Blasters.

Balwant was retained by Chennaiyin for the 2015 season.

=== Mumbai City ===
Balwant signed with Mumbai City for the 2017–18 Indian Super League. Head coach Alexandre Guimarães said that "Mumbai City FC lucky to have Balwant Singh as one of the first picks". He picked up an ankle injury during the pre-season training and was consequently ruled out of play for the opener against Bengaluru. On 23 November, it was announced that he returned to training and was available for selection for the next league match against Goa. He scored his first goal for the club against Pune City. In December, he won the Man of the Match award for scoring an equaliser against Kerala Blasters.

=== ATK ===
Balwant signed with ATK for two seasons in 2018. He was an integral part of the team that became the 2019–20 Indian Super League champions.

=== East Bengal ===
On 12 April 2020, it was officially announced that Balwant has signed on a 2 years contract with Kolkata Giants East Bengal F.C.

== International career ==
Balwant made his international debut for India B on 17 February 2010 against Kyrigyzstan in India's opening match of the 2010 AFC Challenge Cup in which he started and played 79 minutes before being substituted for Jeje Lalpekhlua. Later that year, he made his debut for India at the under-23 level when India took part in the 2010 Asian Games. The match took place on 7 November 2010 against Kuwait in which Singh played the whole match as India's under-23s lost 0–2. Then, later in the tournament, he scored his first ever international goal against Singapore U23s in the 62nd minute as India ran out 4–1 winners. He made his national debut against Mauritius in Hero Tri-Nation Cup and also scored the winning goal. On 5 September Balwant scored a brace which helped them secure a 2–0 win against Macau in the Asian Cup Qualifying.

== Career statistics ==
=== Club ===
As of 26 May 2023

Appearances and goals by club, season and competition
Club	Season	League			Federation Cup		Durand Cup/Super Cup		AFC		Total	
Club	Season	Division	Apps	Goals	Apps	Goals	Apps	Goals	Apps	Goals	Apps	Goals
JCT	2008–09	I-League	14	3	2	1	3	3	—	—	19	7
JCT	2009–10	I-League	13	3	2	0	1	0	—	—	16	3
JCT	2010–11	I-League	11	1	0	0	—	—	—	—	11	1
JCT	Total		38	7	4	1	3	3	0	0	45	11
Salgaocar	2011–12	I-League	3	0	0	0	0	0	—	—	3	0
Salgaocar	2012–13	I-League	0	0	0	0	0	0	2	0	2	0
Salgaocar	Total		3	0	0	0	0	0	2	0	5	0
Churchill Brothers	2013–14	I-League	22	10	5	4	—	—	5	3	32	17
Mohun Bagan	2014–15	I-League	17	6	4	0	0	0	0	0	21	6
Mohun Bagan	2015–16	I-League	5	2	0	0	—	—	0	0	5	2
Mohun Bagan	2016–17	I-League	16	4	5	3	—	—	8	1	29	8
Mohun Bagan	Total		38	12	9	3	0	0	8	1	55	16
Chennaiyin (loan)	2014	Indian Super League	14	1	—	—	—	—	—	—	14	1
Chennaiyin (loan)	2015	Indian Super League	6	0	—	—	—	—	—	—	6	0
Chennaiyin (loan)	Total		20	1	0	0	0	0	0	0	20	1
Mumbai City	2017–18	Indian Super League	16	6	—	—	2	0	—	—	18	6
ATK	2018–19	Indian Super League	15	1	—	—	3	4	—	—	18	5
ATK	2019–20	Indian Super League	8	1	—	—	0	0	—	—	8	1
ATK	Total		23	2	0	0	3	4	0	0	26	6
East Bengal	2020–21	Indian Super League	3	0	—	—	0	0	—	—	3	0
East Bengal	2021–22	Indian Super League	5	0	—	—	0	0	—	—	5	0
East Bengal	Total		8	0	0	0	0	0	0	0	8	0
Delhi FC	2022–23	I-League 2	9	7	—	—	—	—	—	—	9	7
Delhi FC	2023–24	I-League	1	1	—	—	—	—	—	—	1	1
Delhi FC	Total		10	8	0	0	0	0	0	0	10	8
Career total			178	46	18	8	6	7	15	4	217	65

=== International ===
Scores and results list India's goal tally first.

No	Date	Venue	Opponent	Score	Result	Competition	Ref.
1	19 August 2017	Mumbai Football Arena, Mumbai, India	Mauritius	2–1	2–1	2017 Hero Tri-Nation Series	
2	3 September 2017	Estádio Campo Desportivo, Taipa, Macau	Macau	1–0	2–0	2019 AFC Asian Cup qualification	
3	3 September 2017	Estádio Campo Desportivo, Taipa, Macau	Macau	2–0	2–0	2019 AFC Asian Cup qualification	

== Honours ==
Salgaocar

- I-League: 2010–11
- Federation Cup: 2011

Churchill Brothers

- Federation Cup: 2013–14

Mohun Bagan

- I-League: 2014–15
- Federation Cup: 2015–16

Chennaiyin

- Indian Super League: 2015

ATK

- Indian Super League: 2019–20

India

- Tri-Nation Series: 2017
- Intercontinental Cup: 2018
- King's Cup third place: 2019

India U23

- SAFF Championship: 2009

Individual

- FPAI Indian Player of the Season: 2013–14
