= Ajay Singh (footballer) =

Indian footballer (born 1989)

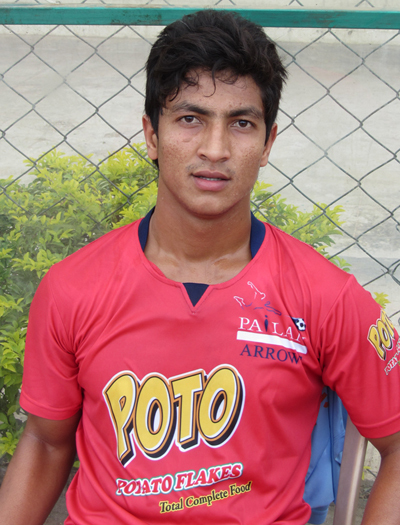
- Singh with Pailan Arrows in 2012

Personal information
- Date of birth: 28 March 1989 (age 37)
- Place of birth: Rupnagar, Punjab, India
- Height: 1.75 m (5 ft 9 in)
- Position: Forward

Team information
- Current team: Delhi FC
- Number: 9

Youth career
- 2008–2010: JCT

Senior career*
Years	Team	Apps	(Gls)
2010–2011	JCT	7	(6)
2011–2012	Pailan Arrows	7	(1)
2012–2013	Churchill Brothers	3	(1)
2013–2014	Mohammedan	11	(1)
2015	Lonestar Kashmir	11	(11)
2015–2016	Mohammedan	15	(6)
2016–2017	Mohun Bagan	5	(3)
2017	Southern Samity	7	(3)
2017–2018	Pune City	0	(0)
2018–2019	Gokulam Kerala	0	(0)
2020–2021	Sudeva Delhi	2	(0)
2021	NEROCA	5	(0)
2023–	Delhi		
- * Club domestic league appearances and goals

Ajay Singh (born 28 March 1989) is an Indian professional footballer who plays for Delhi FC.

== Career ==
=== JCT ===
For the 2010-11 I-League season Ajay Singh spent most of his time with the JCT Under-19 squad where he won the 2011 I-League U19 championship. He did though play seven matches and score six goals for the senior team JCT FC in the I-League.

=== Pailan Arrows ===
During the summer of 2011 Singh signed with Pailan Arrows who were then Indian Arrows in the I-League. He scored his first and only goal for Pailan Arrows in the I-League on 28 April 2012 against HAL at the Bangalore Football Stadium in the 41st minute as Pailan ran out 2–1 winners.

=== Churchill Brothers ===
During the summer of 2012 Singh again moved on and signed for Churchill Brothers who are also of the I-League. He scored his first goal for the club on 4 January 2013 against Shillong Lajong at the Duler Stadium in which he scored in the 55th minute after coming on as a substitute as Churchill Brothers won the match 6–0.

=== Mohammedan ===
Singh made his debut for Mohammedan in the I-League on 21 September 2013 against reigning Pune at the Salt Lake Stadium; and played till the 58th minute before he was being replaced by Israil Gurung; as Mohammedan lost the match 1–3.

=== Lonestar Kashmir ===
Ajay Singh joined Lonestar Kashmir for 2015 I-League 2nd Division where he played 11 times and scored 11 times.

=== Mohammedan ===
Ajay moved back to Mohammedan to play in Calcutta Premier League later that year before joining up with their squad for the 2015-16 I-League 2nd Division.

== Career statistics ==
=== Club ===
As of 9 January 2021

Club	Season	League			Federation Cup		Durand Cup		AFC		Total	
Club	Season	Division	Apps	Goals	Apps	Goals	Apps	Goals	Apps	Goals	Apps	Goals
JCT	2010–11	I-League	7	6	0	0	0	0	—	—	7	6
Pailan Arrows	2011–12	I-League	7	1	3	0	0	0	—	—	10	1
Churchill Brothers	2012–13	I-League	3	1	0	0	0	0	1	0	4	1
Mohammedan	2013–14	I-League	11	1	0	0	0	0	—	—	11	1
Lonestar Kashmir	2015	I-League 2nd Division	11	11	0	0	0	0	—	—	11	11
Mohammedan	2015–16	I-League 2nd Division	15	6	—	—	—	—	—	—	15	6
Pune City	2017–18	Indian Super League	0	0	—	—	—	—	—	—	0	0
Gokulam Kerala	2018–19	I-League	0	0	—	—	—	—	—	—	0	0
Sudeva Delhi FC	2020-2021	I-League	1	0								
Career total			55	26	3	0	0	0	1	0	58	26
