= Penn Orji =

Nigerian footballer

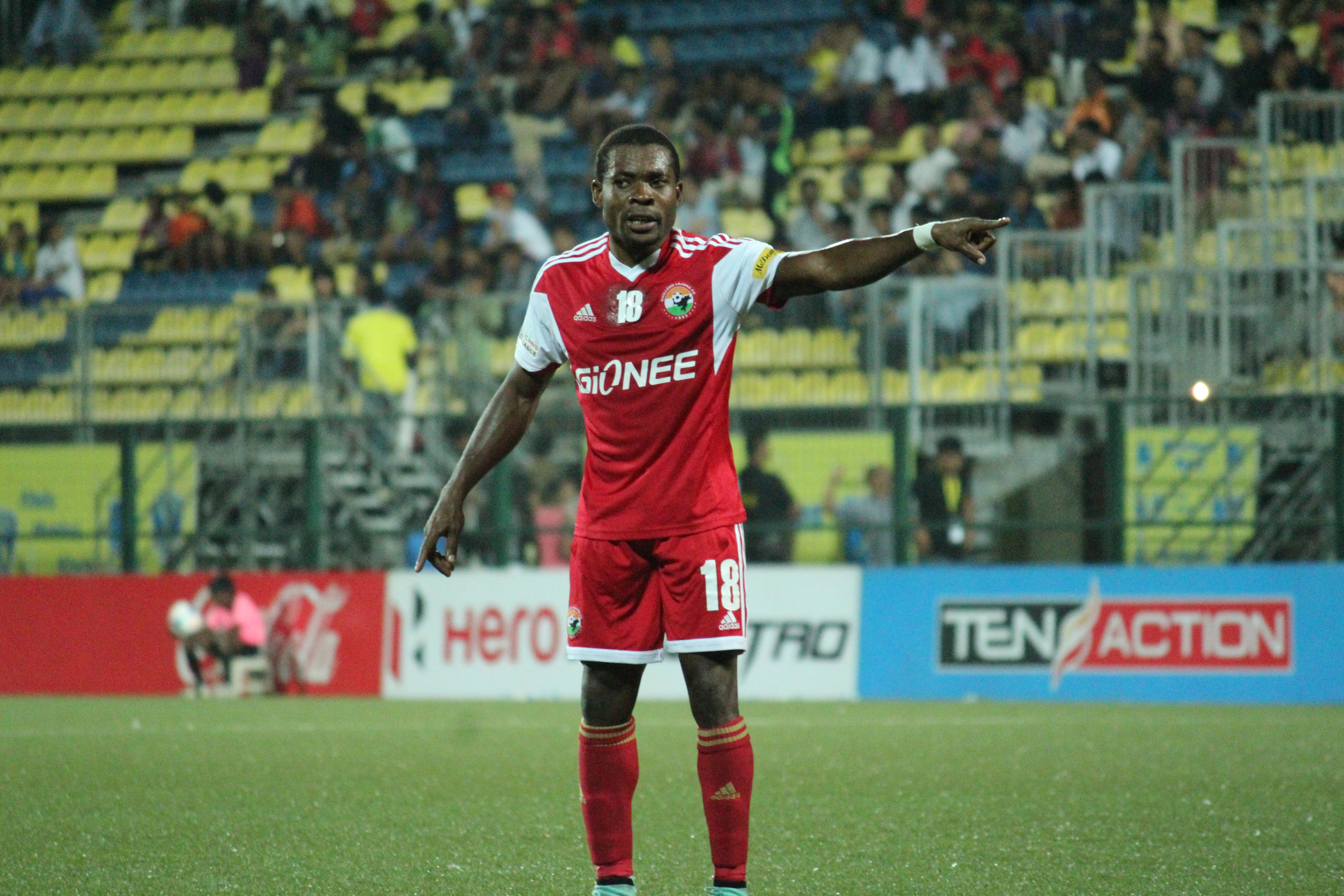

Personal information
- Full name: Penn Orji
- Date of birth: 4 April 1991 (age 35)
- Place of birth: Lagos, Nigeria
- Height: 1.73 m (5 ft 8 in)
- Position: Central midfielder

Team information
- Current team: Vasco S.C.

Senior career*
Years	Team	Apps	(Gls)
2009–2010	JCT	22	(4)
2010–2013	East Bengal	101	(29)
2013–2014	Mohammedan	23	(0)
2014	Kerala Blasters	13	(0)
2015–2016	Shillong Lajong	32	(1)
2016–2017	Stal Kraśnik	7	(0)
2017–2018	Rainbow AC	11	(1)
2018–2021	Vasco	1	(0)
- * Club domestic league appearances and goals as of 14:41, 28 December 2018 (UTC)

Penn Ikechukwu Orji (born 4 April 1991) is a Nigerian football player who last played for Vasco in the Goa Professional League as a central midfielder.

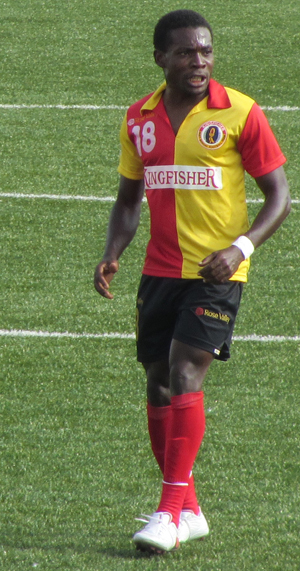
Orji with East Bengal FC
