= 2006 Durand Cup final =

- Event: 2006 Durand Cup
Dempo	JCT
(India)	(India)
1	0
- Date: 27 November 2006
- Venue: Ambedkar Stadium, New Delhi

The 2006 Durand Cup final (or Osian's Durand Cup for sponsorship reason) was the 119th final of the Durand Cup, the oldest football competition in India and third oldest in the world. The final was contested between the two National Football league sides, Dempo SC from Panjim in Goa and JCT FC from Hoshiarpur in Punjab. The tournament was started from 6 November and the final was held on 27 November 2006 in New Delhi.

== Route to the final ==
=== Dempo ===
Date	Round	Opposition	Score
20 November 2006	Group stage	East Bengal	0–0
22 November 2006	Group stage	Army XI	2–1
24 November 2006	Group stage	JCT	1–1
25 November 2006	Semi-final	Mohun Bagan	2–0

Dempo entered the 2006 Durand Cup as one of the National Football league teams. The Goan side were directly placed in the group stage of the tournament. They were allocated Group B along with East Bengal, Army XI and JCT. The opening game, on 20 November 2006, against East Bengal ended with a goalless draw. In the second game, they defeated Army XI with a 2–1 margin. In the third and final game of group stage, Dempo faced JCT and the match ended in a draw, with both teams finding the back of the net. Dempo came second in the group with five points. The semi-final matches were held on 25 November 2006, where Dempo defeated the sixteen times Durand Cup champions, Mohun Bagan 2–0. Beto and Anthony Pereira scored in 21st and 70th minute of the game, thus making way for their first Durand Cup final.

=== JCT ===
Date	Round	Opposition	Score
16 November 2006	Qualifier	Tata FA	2–0
18 November 2006	Qualifier	BSF	3–0
20 November 2006	Group stage	Army XI	0–0
22 November 2006	Group stage	East Bengal	4–0
24 November 2006	Group stage	Dempo	1–1
25 November 2006	Semi-final	Sporting Clube deGoa	1–0 (a.e.t)

JCT entered the 2006 Durand Cup as one of the National Football league teams. JCT started their campaign with a qualifying round. They were allocated Group B of the qualifiers along with Tata Football Academy and Border Security Force football team. JCT won both the qualifier matches with a score line of 2–0 and 3–0, against Tata Football Academy and Border Security Force, respectively. They topped the group with six points and joined Dempo in Group B of the group stage. They drew their first group stage match with Army XI with a 0–0 score line, on 20 November. Then they defeated East Bengal by four goals. The last match against Dempo ended in a 1–1 draw. They had same points as Dempo, but topped the group with more goal difference. In the semi-final, JCT faced Sporting Clube de Goa and won one goal to nil. The match extended till extra time and Chidi Edeh scored the winner in 117th minute.

== Match ==
The final was played on 27 November 2006 at the Ambedkar Stadium in New Delhi. This was Dempo and JCT's second meeting in the tournament. The game remained goalless for 73 minutes. In the next minute, Dempo's Nigerian striker, Ranti Martins broke the deadlock through an assist by Beto. Dempo won their maiden Durand Cup in their maiden final appearance and became the second club from Goa to win this, after Salgaocar.

27 November 2006
17:30 IST

Dempo	1–0	JCT
Martins 74'

Ambedkar Stadium, New Delhi
Referee: Komaleeswaran Shankar

=== Details ===
GK	(India) VP Satish Kumar
DF	(India) Valeriano Rebello
DF	(India) John Charles Dias
DF	(India) Majekodunmi Bolaji	(substituted off) 78'
DF	(India) Samir Naik
MF	(India) Jerry Zirsanga
MF	(Brazil) Beto
MF	(India) Nacimento Silveira
MF	(India) Ishfaq Ahmed	(substituted off) 82'
FW	(Nigeria) Ranty Martins
MF	(India) Anthony Pereira	Substituted off
Substitutes:
DF	(India) Creson Antao	(substituted on) 78'
MF	(India) Melvyn Rodrigues	(substituted on) 82'
FW	(India) Joaquim Abranches	Substituted on
Coach:
(India) Armando Colaco

GK	(India) Kalyan Chaubey
DF	(India) Daljit Singh
DF	(India) Jaspal Singh
MF	(Nigeria) Sunday Ambrose	(substituted off) 25'
DF	(India) Anwar Ali
MF	(India) Adebayo Tokunbo	Substituted off
MF	(India) Shivraj Singh
MF	(India) Harish Sharma
MF	(India) Baldeep Singh
FW	(Nigeria) Chidi Edeh
FW	(India) Praveen Kumar
Substitutes:
	(India) Sukhjinder Singh	(substituted on) 25'
MF	(India) Jaswinder Singh	Substituted on
Manager:
(India) Sukhwinder Singh

== See also ==
- 2000 IFA Shield Final
