= 2011 Durand Cup =

124th season of the Durand Cup

Durand Cup
Tournament details
- Country: India
- Teams: 12

Final positions
- Champions: Churchill Brothers (3rd title)
- Runners-up: Prayag United

Tournament statistics
- Matches played: 27

The 2011 Durand Cup is the 124th edition of the Durand Cup, the third oldest association football competition in the world. Churchill Brothers won the 2011 Durand Cup at the Ambedkar Stadium with a 5–4 tie-break win over Prayag United. The 2010 Durand Cup Champions were Prayag United.

== Background ==
=== Format ===
The Durand Cup is scheduled from 24 September to 15 October 2011. The tournament will be conducted in two stages. Stage 1 will be the Qualifying Knock Out Round and Stage 2 will be Quarter Final League round.

=== I-League Clubs Leaving ===
I-League clubs Mohun Bagan, Dempo, Mumbai, HAL and East Bengal have decided to skip the tournament for various reasons like having to play in other tournaments, to prepare for the I-League or they just don't see worth in the cup.

=== Game Ball ===
COSCO Platina FIFA approved football is the official ball of the tournament.

=== Award Money ===
The cash award for the Winner, Runners up and the 3rd positions will be awarded with Rs. 20 Lakhs, 10 Lakhs and 5 Lakhs respectively.

== Fixtures ==
=== First round ===
The Durand Cup officially started on 24 September 2011 with Delhi United FC beating MEG Bangalore 2–0. Then the second match of the day took place with Assam Rifles demolishing State Bank of Hyderabad 5–1. The next day ARC Shillong beat State Bank of Travancore 2–1 while Indian Air Force beat Shahadra FC 4–3 on penalties after drawing 0–0. Then on 26 September BSF FC beat J&K Bank Football Club 4–3 on penalties after drawing 1–1. Then Bhawanipore FC beat Army Green 3–1 on penalties after drawing 0–0. Then on 27 September Indian Navy FC defeated FC Punjab Police 1–0 while Army Jr FC lost to CRPF 2–1. Then on 28 September BSF FC defeated Bhawanipore FC on penalties 5–3 after drawing 1–1. Then Delhi United FC lost 4–2 to Assam Rifles. Meanwhile, on 30 September BSF beat Tata Football Academy 2–0.

24 September	Delhi United FC	2 - 0	MEG Bangalore	Delhi

24 September	Assam Rifles	5 - 1	State Bank of Hyderabad	Delhi

25 September	ARC Shillong	2 - 1	State Bank of Travancore	Delhi

25 September	Shahadra FC	0 - 0 [3-4 PEN]	Indian Air Force	Delhi

26 September	BSF FC	1 - 1 [4-3 PEN]	J&K Bank Football Club	Delhi
	Singh		Ahmed

26 September	Army Green	0 - 0 [1-3 PEN]	Bhawanipore FC	Delhi

27 September	Indian Navy FC	1 - 0	FC Punjab Police	Delhi
	Kumar

27 September	Army Jr FC	1 - 2	CRPF FC	Delhi
	Sanga		Meitei; Priyo

28 September	BSF FC	1 - 1 [5-3 PEN]	Bhawanipore FC	Delhi

28 September	Delhi United FC	2 - 4	Assam Rifles	Delhi

30 September	BSF FC	2 - 0	Tata Football Academy	Delhi
	Singh; Thapa

1 October	Indian Air Force	1 - 0	CRPF FC	Delhi
	Paneru

== Group stage ==
All matches were played in Delhi

=== Group A ===
Team	Pld	W	D	L	GF	GA	GD	Pts
Prayag United	2	2	0	0	4	0	+4	6
Salgaocar	2	1	0	1	1	2	-1	3
BSF FC	2	0	0	2	0	3	-3	0

=== Group B ===
Team	Pld	W	D	L	GF	GA	GD	Pts
Shillong Lajong	2	2	0	0	5	2	+3	6
United Sikkim	2	1	0	1	4	3	+1	3
Indian Air Force	2	0	0	2	1	5	-4	0

=== Group C ===
Team	Pld	W	D	L	GF	GA	GD	Pts
Pune	2	1	1	0	3	2	+1	4
Air India	2	1	0	1	4	2	+2	3
ONGC	2	0	1	1	1	4	-3	1

=== Group D ===
Team	Pld	W	D	L	GF	GA	GD	Pts
Churchill Brothers	2	2	0	0	7	0	7	6
Mohammedan	2	1	0	1	1	2	-1	3
Army Red	2	0	0	2	0	6	-6	0

== SemiFinals ==
12 October	Prayag United	2 - 0	Pune	Ambedkar Stadium, New Delhi

13 October	Churchill Brothers	4 - 1	Shillong Lajong	Ambedkar Stadium, New Delhi
	Antchouet; Dias; Silva; Balan		Menyongar

== Finals ==
15 October	Churchill Brothers	0–0 (a.e.t.) (5–4 p)	Prayag United	Ambedkar Stadium, New Delhi
