= 2016 Durand Cup final =

Final of the 128th edition of the Durand Cup

- Event: 2016 Durand Cup
NEROCA	Army Green
0	0
- After extra time Army Green won 6–5 on penalties
- Date: 11 September 2016
- Venue: Ambedkar Stadium, Delhi

The 2016 Durand Cup final was the final match of the 128th edition of the Durand Cup, a football competition in India. The match was held on 11 September 2016 at the Ambedkar Stadium in Delhi.

== Match ==
11 September 2016
17:00

NEROCA	0–0 (a.e.t.)	Army Green
	Report
Penalties
	5–6

Ambedkar Stadium, Delhi
