= 2010 Durand Cup =

123rd edition of the Durand Cup

Durand Cup
Tournament details
- Country: India
- Dates: 17 September – 7 November 2010
- Teams: 12

Final positions
- Champions: Chirag United (1st title)
- Runners-up: JCT

Tournament statistics
- Matches played: 15
- Goals scored: 44 (2.93 per match)

Awards
- Best player: Josimar

The 2010 Durand Cup is the 123rd edition of the Durand Cup, the third oldest association football competition in the world. Chirag United won the 2010 Durand Cup at the Ambedkar Stadium with a 0–1 tie-break win over JCT.

== Background ==
=== Format ===
The Durand Cup is scheduled from 17 September to 7 November 2010. The tournament will be conducted in two stages. Stage 1 will be the Qualifying Knock Out Round and Stage 2 will be Quarter Final League round.

=== Withdrawal ===
I-League club Dempo withdrew.

== Qualification ==
=== First round ===
| 17 October | MEG Bangalore | 6–1 | Indian Nationals |
| | | Report |

| 17 October | J&K Bank | 1–0 | Indian Navy |

| 18 October | Army Green | 2–1 | Assam Rifles |

| 18 October | Indian Air Force | 5–1 | Ahbab |

| 19 October | Tata FA | 2–1 | Uttarakhand Police |

| 19 October | Vasco | 0–1 | AOC Secunderabad |

| 20 October | Amity United | 0–0 (4–3 p) | ARC Shillong |

| 20 October | Garhwal Heros | 1–0 | BSF |

=== Second round ===
| 21 October | Tata FA | (3–5 p) | AOC Secunderabad |

| 21 October | MEG Bangalore | 3–1 | J&K Bank |
| | | Report |

| 22 October | Army Green | 1–3 | Indian Air Force |

| 22 October | Amity United | 0–3 | Garhwal Heros |
| | | Report |

=== Third round ===
| 23 October | AOC Secunderabad | 0–1 | MEG Bangalore |
| | | Report | Jiten Meitei 12' |

| 24 October | Indian Air Force | 0–0 (5–3 p) | Garhwal Heros |
| | | Report |

=== Fourth round ===
| 25 October | AOC Secunderabad | 0–3 | Garhwal Heros |

== Group stage ==
All matches will be played in Delhi

=== Group A ===
| Team | Pld | W | D | L | GF | GA | GD | Pts |
|---|---|---|---|---|---|---|---|---|
| Churchill Brothers | 2 | 2 | 0 | 0 | 7 | 3 | +4 | 6 |
| Army XI | 2 | 1 | 0 | 1 | 4 | 3 | +1 | 3 |
| MEG Bangalore | 2 | 0 | 0 | 2 | 2 | 7 | -5 | 0 |

=== Group B ===
| Team | Pld | W | D | L | GF | GA | GD | Pts |
|---|---|---|---|---|---|---|---|---|
| Chirag United | 2 | 1 | 1 | 0 | 5 | 0 | +5 | 4 |
| Pune | 2 | 1 | 1 | 0 | 2 | 0 | +2 | 4 |
| Indian Air Force | 2 | 0 | 0 | 2 | 0 | 5 | -5 | 0 |

=== Group C ===
| Team | Pld | W | D | L | GF | GA | GD | Pts |
|---|---|---|---|---|---|---|---|---|
| JCT | 2 | 2 | 0 | 0 | 5 | 1 | +4 | 6 |
| Sporting Goa | 2 | 1 | 0 | 1 | 2 | 4 | -2 | 3 |
| Garhwal Heros | 2 | 0 | 0 | 2 | 2 | 4 | -2 | 0 |
| Dempo | Withdrew | | | | | | | |

=== Group D ===
| Team | Pld | W | D | L | GF | GA | GD | Pts |
|---|---|---|---|---|---|---|---|---|
| East Bengal | 2 | 2 | 0 | 0 | 6 | 2 | +4 | 6 |
| Salgaocar | 2 | 1 | 0 | 1 | 4 | 3 | +1 | 3 |
| Air India | 2 | 0 | 0 | 2 | 2 | 7 | -5 | 0 |

== Semi-Finals ==
| 4 November | Churchill Brothers | 0–1 (a.e.t.) | JCT |

| 4 November | East Bengal | 0–1 | Chirag United |

== Final ==
| 7 November | JCT | 0–1 | Chirag United | Ambedkar Stadium |
| | | Report | Mohammed Rafique 75' | Referee: Bikramjit Purkaystha |

== Notes ==
Notes

1. Replacement: Dempo withdrew from the tournament and the organisers initiated a qualification match on 25 October between AOC Secunderabad and Garhwal Heroes to determine the replacement which will take part in group C.
