= 2009 Durand Cup final =

- Event: 2009 Durand Cup
Churchill Brothers	Mohun Bagan
(India)	(India)
3	1
- Date: 22 September 2009
- Venue: Ambedkar Stadium, New Delhi

The 2009 Durand Cup final was the 122nd final of the Durand Cup, the oldest football competition in India and third oldest in the world. The final was contested between two I-League sides, Churchill Brothers of Goa and Mohun Bagan from Kolkata. It was held on 22 September 2009 in New Delhi.

Churchill Brothers won their second Durand Cup final after 2007, with a score of 3–1. Odafe Okolie scored a hat trick for Churchill Brothers.

== Route to the final ==
=== Churchill Brothers ===
Date	Round	Opposition	Score
15 September 2009	Group Stage	Sporting Goa	1–0
17 September 2009	Group Stage	Assam Rifles	1–1
19 September 2009	Semi Final	Dempo	2–1

Churchill Brothers entered the 2009 Durand Cup as one of the I-League teams and the runner-up from the previous season. They were placed in Group A along with Sporting Clube de Goa and an Indian Armed Forces team, Assam Rifles. In the opening game, Churchil Brothers defeated Sporting Clube de Goa 1–0. In the second game, they drew against Assam rifles with both teams scoring each. They topped the group and ended their group stage campaign with four points. The first semi-final was held on 19 September 2009, where Churchill Brothers faced Dempo, and defeated them 2–1. Odafe Okolie scored a brace in the 20th and 50th minute and the team reached their third successive Durand Cup final.

=== Mohun Bagan ===
Date	Round	Opposition	Score
16 September 2009	Group Stage	ONGC	5–1
18 September 2009	Group Stage	JCT	2–0
20 September 2009	Semi Final	Mahindra United	2–1

Mohun Bagan entered the 2009 Durand Cup as one of the I-League teams. They were allocated Group B with ONGC and JCT. Mohun Bagan won both group stage matches with a score line of 5–1 and 2–0 against ONGC and JCT respectively. They topped the group and ended their group stage campaign with six points. The second semi-final was held in September 2009, where Mohun Bagan defeated Mahindra United by a score of 2–1. Chidi Edeh scored both goals for Mohun Bagan in 19th and 72nd minute.

== Match ==
The final was played on 22 September 2009 at the Ambedkar Stadium in New Delhi. The match remained goalless in the regulation time and it went for extra time. Chidi Edeh scored the first goal in the 94th minute, for Mohun Bagan. Six minutes later, Odafa scored the equaliser and went on scoring two more goals in the 104th and 110th minute. He scored a hat trick in ten minutes and sealed the second Durand Cup title for Churchil brothers. The final scoreline was 3–1.

=== Details ===
22 September 2009
17:30 IST

Churchill Brothers	3–1 (a.e.t.)	Mohun Bagan
Nacimento Silveira (yellow card) 44'; Odafe Okolie 100', 104', 110'	Report	Micky Fernandes (yellow card) 5'; Chidi Edeh 94'

Ambedkar Stadium, New Delhi

GK	(India) Arindam Bhattacharya
RB	(India) Naoba Singh	(substituted off) 84'
CB	(India) Rowilson Rodrigues
CB	(India) Gouramangi Singh
LB	(India) Robert Lalthalma
	(India) Charan Rai
MF	(India) Nacimento Silveira	(substituted off) 90'
MF	(Nigeria) Ogba Kalu
MF	(India) Khanthang Paite	(substituted off) 82'
ST	(Nigeria) Odafe Okolie
MF	(India) Reisangmei Vashum
Substitutes:
GK	(India) Naveen Kumar	(substituted on) 84'
CM	(India) Lenny Rodrigues	(substituted on) 90'
MF	(India) Jaison Vales	(substituted on) 82'
Coach:
(Brazil) Carlos Roberto Pereira

GK	(India) Sangram Mukherjee
RB	(India) Surkumar Singh
CB	(India) Deepak Mondal
CB	(India) Rakesh Masih
LM	(India) Nallappan Mohanraj	(substituted off) 106'
LB	(India) James Singh	(substituted off) 85'
CM	(India) Micky Fernandes
CM	(India) Kulothungan
RM	(India) Snehashis Chakraborty	(substituted off) 67'
ST	(Nigeria) Chidi Edeh
ST	(Brazil) Barreto
Substitutes:
LM	(India) Branco Cardozo	(substituted on) 106'
RM	(India) Subhodeep Majumdar	(substituted on) 85'
ST	(India) Santha Kumar	(substituted on) 67'
Manager:
(Morocco) Karim Bencherifa

== See also ==
- 2009 IFA Shield
