= 2004 Durand Cup final =

Football competition in India

- Event: 2004 Durand Cup
East Bengal	Mohun Bagan
2	1
- Date: 10 November 2004
- Venue: Ambedkar Stadium, Delhi
- Man of the Match: Chandan Das
- Attendance: 10,000 (approx.)

The 2004 Durand Cup final was the 117th final of the Durand Cup, the oldest football competition in India, and was contested between Kolkata giants East Bengal and Mohun Bagan on 10 November 2004 at the Ambedkar Stadium in Delhi.

East Bengal won the final 2–1 to claim their 16th Durand Cup title. Captain Chandan Das scored a brace for East Bengal including a last minute winner as East Bengal won the title.

== Route to the final ==
=== East Bengal ===
Date	Round	Opposition	Score
4 November 2004	Group Stage	Army XI	3–1
6 November 2004	Group Stage	Sporting Club de Goa	4–0
8 November 2004	Semi Final	JCT	1–0

East Bengal entered the 2004 Durand Cup as one of the National Football League teams and the runner-up from the previous season. They were allocated into Group B alongside Army XI and Sporting Club de Goa. In the opening game East Bengal defeated Army XI 3–1. Paulo Roberto da Silva scored a brace and Chandan Das scored the other for East Bengal. In the second game, East Bengal defeated Sporting Club de Goa 4–0 as Ernest Jeremiah scored a debut hattrick and Chandan Das scored the other as East Bengal topped the group and reached the last four. In the semi-final, East Bengal defeated JCT 1–0 with Syed Rahim Nabi scoring the solitary goal as East Bengal reached their third consecutive Durand Cup final.

=== Mohun Bagan ===
Date	Round	Opposition	Score
3 November 2004	Group Stage	Assam Rifles	5–0
5 November 2004	Group Stage	State Bank of Travancore	3–1
7 November 2004	Semi Final	Salgaocar	0–0 (5–4 pen)

Mohun Bagan entered the 2004 Durand Cup as one of the National Football League teams and were allocated into Group C alongside State Bank of Travancore and Assam Rifles. In the opening game, Mohun Bagan defeated Assam Rifles 5–0 as Sunil Chhetri scored a brace while Mehtab Hossain, Eduardo and Dharamjit Singh scored the other three. In the second match, Mohun Bagan defeated State Bank of Travancore 3–1. Noel Wilson, Mehtab Hossain and Eduardo scored for Bagan as they topped the group and reached the last four. In the semi-final, Mohun Bagan defeated the defending champions Salgaocar 5–4 in penalty shootout after the game ended goalless after added extra time as Mohun Bagan reached the finals.

== Match ==
=== Details ===
10 November 2004
14:30 IST

East Bengal	2–1	Mohun Bagan
Madhab Das (yellow card) 40' (yellow-red card) 75'; Chandan Das 24' (pen.), 90+1'	Report	Douglas Silva 76' (o.g.)

Ambedkar Stadium, Delhi
Attendance: 10,000 (est.)
Referee: P.K. Bose (Madhya Pradesh)

East Bengal	Mohun Bagan

GK	(India) Rajat Ghosh Dastidar
RB	(India) Akshay Das	(substituted off) 85'
CB	(India) Debjit Ghosh
CB	(India) Madhab Das	(yellow card) 40' (yellow-red card) 75'
CB	(India) Selwyn Fernandes	(substituted off) 52'
LB	(India) Habibur Rehman Mondal
RM	(India) Shylo Malsawmtluanga
CM	(Brazil) Douglas Silva
LM	(India) Chandan Das (c)
ST	(India) Alvito D'Cunha
ST	(Nigeria) Ernest Jeremiah
Substitutes:
CM	(India) Climax Lawrence	(substituted on) 52'
ST	(India) Bijen Singh	(substituted on) 85'
Coach:
(India) Subhash Bhowmick

GK	(India) Subrata Paul
RB	(India) Manitombi Singh
CB	(India) Dulal Biswas (c)
CB	(Brazil) Eduardo Coelho	(substituted off) 40'
LB	(India) Rishi Kapoor
LM	(India) Mehtab Hussain	(substituted off) 71'
CM	(India) Noel Wilson
CM	(India) Basudeb Mondal
RM	(India) Dharamjit Singh	(substituted off) 66'
ST	(Nigeria) James Ugwo	(substituted off) 40'
ST	(India) Sunil Chhetri
Substitutes:
LM	(India) Tomba Singh	(substituted on) 40'
RM	(India) Jerry Zirsanga	(substituted on) 66'
ST	(India) Ashim Biswas	(substituted on) 40'
Manager:
(India) Aloke Mukherjee

Hero of the Match:
Chandan Das (East Bengal)

Match rules

- 90 minutes.
- 30 minutes of extra time if necessary.
- Penalty shoot-out if scores still level.

== See also ==
- Durand Cup 2004, rsssf.com
- 117th Durand Cup 2004, indianfootball.de
