= 1972–73 Durand Cup final =

- Event: 1972–73 Durand Cup
East Bengal	Mohun Bagan
- East Bengal won after a replay

Final
East Bengal	Mohun Bagan
0	0
- Date: 11 January 1973
- Venue: Corporation Stadium, New Delhi, India
- Referee: J. P. Coutinho
- Attendance: 20,000 (estd.)

Replay
East Bengal	Mohun Bagan
1	0
- Date: 12 January 1973
- Venue: Corporation Stadium, New Delhi, India
- Referee: J. P. Coutinho
- Attendance: 15,000 (estd.)

The 1972–73 Durand Cup final was the 68th final of the Durand Cup, the oldest football competition in India, and was contested between Kolkata giants East Bengal and Mohun Bagan first on 11 January 1973 and the replay on 12 January 1973 at the Corporation Stadium in New Delhi.

East Bengal won the replay final 1–0 to claim their 7th Durand Cup title. Mohammed Habib scored the only goal in the final as East Bengal lifted their seventh Durand Cup title.

== Route to the final ==
East Bengal		Round	Mohun Bagan	
Opponent	Result	Round	Opponent	Result
B.B.Star	10–0	First Round	Ambala Heroes	2–0
Sikh Regimental Centre	3–0	Second Round	Andhra Police	3–0
Madras Regimental Centre	2–0	Quarter–Final	Indian Air Force	1–0
Simla Youngs	1–1; 7–0	Semi–Final	Mafatlal	1–1; 1–0

== Match ==
=== Summary ===
The Durand Cup final began at the Corporation Stadium in New Delhi on 11 January 1973 in front of a packed crowd as Kolkata giants East Bengal and Mohun Bagan faced each other in a Kolkata Derby. East Bengal reached their ninth Durand Cup final after defeating Simla Youngs 7–0 in the semi-final, having won the tournament six times previously in 1951, 1952, 1956, 1960, 1967, and 1970. Mohun Bagan reached their tenth Durand Cup final after they defeated Mafatlal 1–0 in the semi-final, having won the tournament six times previously in 1953, 1959, 1960, 1963, 1964, and 1965. -

East Bengal started as the favourites having a star studded lineup, being unbeaten throughout the season so far, having already won the Calcutta Football League and the IFA Shield. Mohun Bagan custodian Tarun Bose was the busiest throughout the match, making multiple saves as East Bengal failed to break the deadlock. Mohun Bagan did get a chance in the twenty-first minute when Subhash Bhowmick found himself in front of the goal but wasted the opportunity. In the second half, both the teams failed to break the deadlock as the game ended in a 0–0 stalemate. The Durand committee decided to host the replay final the very next day.

=== Details ===
11 January 1973
15:00 IST

East Bengal	0–0	Mohun Bagan

Corporation Stadium, New Delhi
Attendance: 20,000 (est.)
Referee: J. P. Coutinho

East Bengal	Mohun Bagan

GK	(India) Arun Banerjee
RB	(India) Sudhir Karmakar (c)
CB	(India) Ashok Banerjee
CB	(India) Chandreshwar Prasad
LB	(India) Prabir Mazumdar
CM	(India) Mohon Singh
CM	(India) Gautam Sarkar
FW	(India) Latifuddin	Substituted off
FW	(India) Mohammed Habib
FW	(India) Mohammed Akbar
FW	(India) Samaresh Chowdhury
Substitutes:
FW	(India) Shambhu Mitra	Substituted in
Coach:
(India) P. K. Banerjee

GK	(India) Tarun Bose
RB	(India) Nimai Goswami
CB	(India) Shyamal Ghosh
CB	(India) Syed Nayeemuddin (c)
LB	(India) Shankar Banerjee
CM	(India) Shyamsundar Manna
CM	(India) Barun Mishra
FW	(India) Surajit Sengupta
FW	(India) Parimal Dey	Substituted off
FW	(India) Subhash Bhowmick
FW	(India) Mohammed Najir
Substitutes:
FW	(India) Sukalyan Ghosh Dastidar	Substituted in
Coach:
(India) Arun Ghosh

Match rules

- 90 minutes.
- Replay if scores still level.

== Replay ==
=== Summary ===
The replay final began at the Corporation Stadium in New Delhi on 12 January 1973 as the first final finished in a 0–0 draw.

East Bengal once again started as the favourites and made attacks from the very first minute, however, Mohun Bagan custodian Tarun Bose was once again at the rescue as he saved multiple shots to keep the game scoreless. East Bengal eventually got the opportunity to score in the seventy-seventh minute of the match when Shankar Banerjee handled the ball inside the box while clearing a cross by Samaresh Chowdhury and East Bengal was awarded a penalty. Mohammed Habib scored from the spot as East Bengal took a 1–0 lead which they managed to hold onto until fulltime as East Bengal lifted their seventh Durand Cup title.

=== Details ===
12 January 1973
15:00 IST

East Bengal	1–0	Mohun Bagan
Habib 77' (pen.)

Corporation Stadium, New Delhi
Attendance: 15,000 (est.)
Referee: J. P. Coutinho

East Bengal	Mohun Bagan

GK	(India) Arun Banerjee
RB	(India) Sudhir Karmakar (c)
CB	(India) Ashok Banerjee
CB	(India) Chandreshwar Prasad
LB	(India) Santo Mitra
CM	(India) Mohon Singh
CM	(India) Gautam Sarkar
FW	(India) Latifuddin
FW	(India) Mohammed Habib
FW	(India) Mohammed Akbar	Substituted off
FW	(India) Samaresh Chowdhury
Substitutes:
FW	(India) Shambhu Mitra	Substituted in
Coach:
(India) P. K. Banerjee

GK	(India) Tarun Bose
RB	(India) Nimai Goswami
CB	(India) Shyamal Ghosh
CB	(India) Syed Nayeemuddin (c)
LB	(India) Shankar Banerjee
CM	(India) Shyamsundar Manna
CM	(India) Barun Mishra
FW	(India) Surajit Sengupta
FW	(India) Sukalyan Ghosh Dastidar
FW	(India) Subhash Bhowmick
FW	(India) Chandan Gupta
Substitutes:
—
Coach:
(India) Arun Ghosh

Match rules

- 90 minutes.
- Joint winners if both finals ends in a draw.
