= 1960–61 Durand Cup final =

- Event: 1960–61 Durand Cup
Mohun Bagan	East Bengal
- Joint winners declared after a replay

Final
Mohun Bagan	East Bengal
1	1
- Date: 18 January 1961
- Venue: Corporation Stadium, New Delhi, India
- Referee: M.K.G. Kakkar
- Attendance: 20,000 (estd.)

Replay
Mohun Bagan	East Bengal
0	0
- Date: 19 January 1961
- Venue: Corporation Stadium, New Delhi, India
- Referee: M.K.G. Kakkar
- Attendance: 15,000 (estd.)

The 1960–61 Durand Cup final was the 57th final of the Durand Cup, the oldest football competition in India, and was contested between Kolkata giants Mohun Bagan and East Bengal first on 18 January 1961 and then a replay on 19 January 1961 at the Corporation Stadium in New Delhi.

Both Mohun Bagan and East Bengal were declared as joint winners after both the finals ended in a draw.

== Route to the final ==
Mohun Bagan		Round	East Bengal	
Opponent	Result	Round	Opponent	Result
bye	–	First Round	Pal Wanderers	8–0
Punjab Police	2–1	Second Round	Assam Regimental Centre	2–1
Indian Air Force	0–0; 5–0	Quarter–Final	Madras Regimental Centre	4–0
Gorkha Brigade	1–0	Semi–Final	City College Old Boys	1–0

== Match ==
=== Summary ===
The Durand Cup final began at the Delhi Gate Stadium in New Delhi on 18 January 1961 in front of a packed crowd as Kolkata giants East Bengal and Mohun Bagan faced each other in a Kolkata Derby, first time in the final of the Durand Cup. Mohun Bagan, the defending champions, made their fourth appearance in the final after they defeated Gorkha Brigade 1–0 in the semi-final, having previously won the cup in 1953 and 1959. East Bengal reached their fifth Durand Cup final after defeating City College Old Boys 1–0 in the semi-final, having won the tournament previously thrice in 1951, 1952, and 1956.

Mohun Bagan and East Bengal both tried to take control of the game in the first half but canceled each other out as the game remained goalless, until the third minute of the second half when East Bengal took the lead through a penalty kick, taken perfectly by Arun Ghosh. Mohun Bagan equalized just a couple of minutes later as Amiya Banerjee scored to make it 1–1. Both teams had chances to win the game but failed to do so, as the game finished 1–1, and the organizing committee decided to host the replay final the very next day.

=== Details ===
18 January 1961
15:30 IST

Mohun Bagan	1–1	East Bengal
Amiya Banerjee 35'		Arun Ghosh 33' (pen.)

Corporation Stadium, New Delhi
Attendance: 20,000 (est.)
Referee: M.K.G. Kakkar

Mohun Bagan	East Bengal

GK	(India) Chittaranjan Das
FB	(India) Rahman
FB	(India) Jarnail Singh
FB	(India) Prasanta Sarkhel
HB	(India) Mariappa Kempaiah
HB	(India) Asim Dhar
FW	(India) Dipu Das
FW	(India) Amal Chakraborty
FW	(India) Amiya Banerjee
FW	(India) Chuni Goswami (c)
FW	(India) Sukumar Samajpati

GK	(India) Abani Bose
FB	(India) Chitto Chanda
FB	(India) Arun Ghosh
FB	(India) Subhasis Guha
HB	(India) Baloo
HB	(India) Ram Bahadur Chettri (c)
FW	(India) Muhammad Kannayan
FW	(India) B. Narayan
FW	(India) Dharmalingam Kannan
FW	(India) Nilesh Sarkar
FW	(India) Tulsidas Balaram

Match rules

- 60 minutes.
- Replay if scores still level.
- No Substitutes.

== Replay ==
=== Summary ===
The replay final began at the Delhi Gate Stadium in New Delhi on 19 January 1961 as the first final finished in a 1–1 draw.

Mohun Bagan started fast by creating a few attacks with Chuni Goswami and Amiya Banerjee linking up together but the East Bengal defense led by Arun Ghosh held firm. Both teams tried to take control of the game in different spells but failed to break the deadlock as the game ended in a goalless stalemate. No extra time was played and the organizing committee decided to declare both the teams as joint winners, with a coin toss taking place, which Mohun Bagan won, thus they got to keep the trophy first six months while East Bengal would keep it in the next six. This win for both the teams meant East Bengal had been crowned the Durand Cup champions for the fourth time, after 1951, 1952, and 1956 while Mohun Bagan got crowned champions for the third time after 1953 and 1959.

=== Details ===
19 January 1961
15:30 IST

Mohun Bagan	0–0	East Bengal

Corporation Stadium, New Delhi
Attendance: 15,000 (est.)
Referee: M.K.G. Kakkar

Mohun Bagan	East Bengal

GK	(India) Chittaranjan Das
FB	(India) Rahman
FB	(India) Jarnail Singh
FB	(India) Prasanta Sarkhel
HB	(India) Mariappa Kempaiah
HB	(India) Asim Dhar
FW	(India) Dipu Das
FW	(India) Amal Chakraborty
FW	(India) Amiya Banerjee
FW	(India) Chuni Goswami (c)
FW	(India) Sukumar Samajpati

GK	(India) Abani Bose
FB	(India) Chitto Chanda
FB	(India) Arun Ghosh
FB	(India) Subhasis Guha
HB	(India) Baloo
HB	(India) Ram Bahadur Chettri (c)
FW	(India) Muhammad Kannayan
FW	(India) B. Narayan
FW	(India) Dharmalingam Kannan
FW	(India) Nilesh Sarkar
FW	(India) Tulsidas Balaram

Match rules

- 60 minutes.
- Joint winners if both finals ends in a draw.
- No Substitutes.
