= 1970–71 Durand Cup final =

- Event: 1970–71 Durand Cup
East Bengal	Mohun Bagan
2	0
- Date: 4 February 1971
- Venue: Corporation Stadium, New Delhi, India
- Referee: Trilok Lao
- Attendance: 15,000 (estd.)

The 1970–71 Durand Cup final was the 66th final of the Durand Cup, the oldest football competition in India, and was contested between Kolkata giants East Bengal and Mohun Bagan on 4 February 1971 at the Corporation Stadium in New Delhi.

East Bengal won the final 2–0 to claim their 6th Durand Cup title. Mohammed Habib scored both the goals in the final as East Bengal lifted their sixth Durand Cup title.

== Route to the final ==
East Bengal		Round	Mohun Bagan	
Opponent	Result	Round	Opponent	Result
bye	–	First round	Modernities	5–0
Rajasthan Armed Constabulary	3–2	Second round	LRDI Bengaluru	2–1
Sikh Regimental Centre	4–2	Quarter-final	Madras Regimental Centre	2–1
Mafatlal	0–0; 1–0	Semi-final	Mohammedan Sporting	1–1; 3–0

== Match ==
=== Summary ===
The Durand Cup final began at the Corporation Stadium in New Delhi on 4 February 1971 in front of a packed crowd as Kolkata giants East Bengal and Mohun Bagan faced each other in a Kolkata Derby. East Bengal reached their eighth Durand Cup final after defeating Mafatlal 1–0 in the semi-final, having won the tournament five times previously in 1951, 1952, 1956, 1960, and 1967. Mohun Bagan reached their ninth Durand Cup final after they defeated another Kolkata giant Mohammedan Sporting 3–0 in the semi-final, having won the tournament six times previously in 1953, 1959, 1960, 1963, 1964, and 1965. -

East Bengal started the game with a positive intent and made multiple attacks at the Mohun Bagan goal and took the lead in the tenth minute when Ashok Chatterjee found Mohammed Habib open inside the box and the latter made no error to make it 1–0. East Bengal kept on attacking in the first half however, failed to increase their lead as the teams went onto halftime break. The second half began in the same way like the first and East Bengal doubled their lead in just ten minutes of the half when Mohammed Habib once again scored with a brilliant header from a cross by Swapan Sengupta to make it 2–0. East Bengal defence led by Sudhir Karmakar, Syed Nayeemuddin, Sunil Bhattacharya and Santo Mitra managed to hold onto the lead as East Bengal lifted their sixth Durand Cup title.

=== Details ===
4 February 1971
15:00 IST

East Bengal	2–0	Mohun Bagan
Habib 10', 55'

Corporation Stadium, New Delhi
Attendance: 15,000 (est.)
Referee: Trilok Lao

East Bengal	Mohun Bagan

GK	(India) Kanai Sarkar
RB	(India) Sudhir Karmakar
CB	(India) Shanto Mitra (c)
CB	(India) Syed Nayeemuddin
LB	(India) Sunil Bhattacharya
CM	(India) Prasanta Sinha
CM	(India) Kajal Mukherjee
FW	(India) Swapan Sengupta
FW	(India) Mohammed Habib
FW	(India) Ashok Chatterjee
FW	(India) Shyam Thapa
Coach:
(India) Mohammed Hussain

GK	(India) Balai Dey
RB	(India) Chandreshwar Prasad
CB	(India) Bhabani Ray
CB	(India) Kalon Saha
LB	(India) Shankar Sarkar
CM	(India) Shyamsundar Manna
CM	(India) Priyalal Mazumdar
FW	(India) Mohabir Prasad	Substituted off
FW	(India) Sukalyan Ghosh Dastidar (c)
FW	(India) Subhash Bhowmick
FW	(India) Pranab Ganguly	Substituted off
Substitutes:
FW	(India) Debi Dutta	Substituted in
FW	(India) Chandan Gupta	Substituted in
Coach:
(India) Arun Ghosh

Match rules

- 90 minutes.
- Replay if scores still level.
