= Keegan Nash =

Australian soccer player (born 1986)

Personal information
- Full name: Keegan Sean Nash
- Date of birth: 18 July 1986 (age 40)
- Place of birth: Adelaide, Australia
- Height: 1.86 m (6 ft 1 in)
- Position: Centre-back

Senior career*
Years	Team	Apps	(Gls)
2003	Modbury Jets	2	(0)
2003–2004	Enfield City	7	(0)
2004–2006	Campbelltown City	23	(0)
2007–2009	Adelaide City	38	(0)
2009	Chirag United	1	(0)
2010	Adelaide City	5	(0)
2011–2012	Adelaide Comets	22	(1)
2013	Cumberland United	8	(0)
2013	Adelaide Comets	9	(0)
- * Club domestic league appearances and goals

Keegan Nash (born 18 July 1986 in Adelaide, Australia) is an Australian former soccer player who is last known to have played for Adelaide Comets from 2011 to 2013.

== India ==
Completing a move to Chirag United of the Indian I-League in October 2009, Nash partnered up with Brazilian Eduardo Du in defense, making his first start in a 2–1 triumph over Mumbai. However, an ankle injury during practice curtailed his stay there and the Australian defender was released later that month.
