= 1967–68 Durand Cup final =

- Event: 1967–68 Durand Cup
East Bengal	Bengal Nagpur Railway
1	0
- Date: 11 January 1968
- Venue: Corporation Stadium, New Delhi, India
- Referee: Trilok Lao
- Attendance: 15,000 (estd.)

The 1967–68 Durand Cup final was the 63rd final of the Durand Cup, the oldest football competition in India, and was contested between Kolkata giant East Bengal and Bengal Nagpur Railway on 11 January 1968 at the Corporation Stadium in New Delhi.

East Bengal won the final 1–0 to claim their 5th Durand Cup title. Mohammed Habib scored the only goal in the final as East Bengal lifted their fifth Durand Cup title.

== Route to the final ==
East Bengal		Round	Bengal Nagpur Railway	
Opponent	Result	Round	Opponent	Result
Indian Navy	2–0	Second Round	–	–
Madras Regimental Centre	2–1	Quarter–Final	Mohammedan Sporting	1–0
Hyderabad City Police	0–0; 1–0	Semi–Final	Leaders Club	1–1; 3–2

== Match ==
=== Summary ===
The Durand Cup final began at the Corporation Stadium in New Delhi on 11 January 1968 in front of a packed crowd as Kolkata giant East Bengal and faced Bengal Nagpur Railway. East Bengal reached their sixth Durand Cup final after defeating Hyderabad City Police 1–0 in the semi-final, having won the tournament previously in 1951, 1952, 1956, and 1960. Bengal Nagpur Railway made their maiden appearance in the final after they defeated Leaders Club 3–2 in the semi-final.

The game started steadily with both teams being cautious in the first fifteen minutes. East Bengal, being the favourites, started dominating the game and the likes of K. Sharma, Ashim Bose and Sunil Bhattacharya all made attempts at the B. N. R. goal but could not break the deadlock. East Bengal made a substitution at halftime as S. Sarkar replaced Afzal and the change made an immediate impact on the game as S. Sarkar put a measured cross for Mohammed Habib who could not connect properly. The deadlock was finally broken in the fifty-sixth minute as Habib found the winner with a header to make it 1–0 for East Bengal. B. N. R. tried to make a comeback in the game after conceding the goal but the East Bengal defence dealt with the attacks and managed to hold onto the lead till full-time as East Bengal lifted their fifth Durand Cup title.

=== Details ===
11 January 1968
15:00 IST

East Bengal	1–0	Bengal Nagpur Railway
Habib 56'

Corporation Stadium, New Delhi
Attendance: 15,000 (est.)
Referee: Trilok Lao

East Bengal	Bengal Nagpur Railway

GK	(India) Peter Thangaraj
RB	(India) Shanto Mitra
CB	(India) Kalon Guha
CB	(India) Syed Nayeemuddin
LB	(India) Sunil Bhattacharya
CM	(India) Prasanta Sinha (c)
CM	(India) D.M.K. Afzal	Substituted off
FW	(India) Ashim Bose
FW	(India) Mohammed Habib
FW	(India) Parimal Dey
FW	(India) K. B. Sharma
Substitutes:
CM	(India) S. Sarkar	Substituted in
Coach:
(India) Mohammed Hussain

GK	(India) Dipak Das
RB	(India) J. Lakra
CB	(India) A. Dey
CB	(India) Arun Ghosh (c)
LB	(India) Kalyan Saha
CM	(India) K. Tirkey
CM	(India) N. Sengupta
FW	(India) S. Das
FW	(India) Rajendramohan
FW	(India) P. Sur	Substituted off
FW	(India) P. Mazumdar
Substitutes:
FW	(India) K. Appalaraju	Substituted in
Coach:
(India) Arun Ghosh

Match rules

- 90 minutes.
- Replay if scores still level.
