= 2016 Durand Cup =

128th edition of the Durand Cup

Tournament details
- Country: India
- Dates: 28 August – 11 September 2016
- Teams: 12

Final positions
- Champions: Army Green (1st title)
- Runners-up: NEROCA

Tournament statistics
- Matches played: 30
- Goals scored: 86 (2.87 per match)
- All statistics correct as of 8 September 2016.

The 2016 Durand Cup was the 128th edition of the Durand Cup since the tournament's founding in 1888. 12 teams competed in the tournament hosted at the Ambedkar Stadium and Harbaksh Stadium in Delhi from 28 August 2016. The final took place at the Ambedkar Stadium on 11 September 2016.

Army Green won the tournament for the first time by defeating NEROCA on penalties 6–5.

== Rounds and dates ==
| Round | Match date | Number of fixtures | Teams |
|---|---|---|---|
| Group stage | 28 August–7 September | 30 | 12 |
| Semi-final | 9 September | 2 | 4 |
| Final | 11 September | 1 | 2 |

== Prize money ==
| Position | Prize money |
|---|---|
| Champions | ₹4.5 million (US$47,000) |
| Runners-up | ₹2 million (US$21,000) |
| Semi-finalists | ₹0.5 million (US$5,200) |
| Total | ~₹7 million (US$73,000) |

== Teams ==
Group A
Army Green
DSK Shivajians
Gangtok Himalayan
Indian Navy
Minerva Academy
Sporting Goa
Group B
Aizawl
Army Red
Dempo
Indian Air Force
Real Kashmir
NEROCA

== Group stage ==
All times listed below are at IST

=== Group A ===
| Pos | Team | Pld | W | D | L | GF | GA | GD | Pts | Qualification |
|---|---|---|---|---|---|---|---|---|---|---|
| 1 | DSK Shivajians | 5 | 3 | 1 | 1 | 10 | 8 | +2 | 10 | Advance to Semi-finals |
| 2 | Army Green | 5 | 2 | 2 | 1 | 7 | 6 | +1 | 8 | Advance to Semi-finals |
| 3 | Sporting Goa | 5 | 2 | 1 | 2 | 11 | 8 | +3 | 7 | |
| 4 | Indian Navy | 5 | 1 | 3 | 1 | 9 | 7 | +2 | 6 | |
| 5 | Gangtok Himalayan | 5 | 2 | 0 | 3 | 6 | 9 | −3 | 6 | |
| 6 | Minerva Academy | 5 | 1 | 1 | 3 | 6 | 11 | −5 | 4 | |

Updated to match(es) played on 7 September 2016. Source:

28 August 2016
18:30

| Sporting Goa | 1–2 | DSK Shivajians |
|---|---|---|
| Victorino Fernandes 63' | Report | 9' Rohit Kumar; 43' Kim Song-yong |

Ambedkar Stadium, Delhi

29 August 2016
18:30

| Sporting Goa | 1–1 | Indian Navy |
|---|---|---|
| Loveday Enyinnaya 21' | Report | 69' |

Ambedkar Stadium, Delhi

30 August 2016
15:30

| Indian Navy | 1–1 | Army Green |
|---|---|---|
| Bikram Adhikari 29' | | 59' PC Lallawmkina |

Harbaksh Stadium, Delhi

30 August 2016
18:45

| Minerva Academy | 0–2 | Gangtok Himalayan |
|---|---|---|
| | Report | 52' Bhaichung Bhutia Jr; 72' John Kane Arho |

Ambedkar Stadium, Delhi

31 August 2016
18:45

| DSK Shivajians | 2–1 | Gangtok Himalayan |
|---|---|---|
| Rohit Kumar 5' 44' | Report | 78' Jon Lepcha |

Ambedkar Stadium, Delhi

1 September 2016
14:00

| Indian Navy | 3–0 | Minerva Academy |
|---|---|---|
| Pawandeep Singh 30', 37'; Lalchhuanmawia 40' | Report |

Ambedkar Stadium, Delhi

1 September 2016
20:00

| Army Green | 2–1 | Sporting Goa |
|---|---|---|
| PC Lallawnkina 53' (pen.), 58' | Report | 82' Masceranhas |

Ambedkar Stadium, Delhi

2 September 2016
16:30

| DSK Shivajians | 3–3 | Indian Navy |
|---|---|---|
| Rohit Kumar 36'; Arif Shaikh 45'; Juan Quero 46' | Report | 3' Bibake Thapa; 60' Wayne Vaz; 90+3' Mohammed Irshad |

Ambedkar Stadium, Delhi

3 September 2016
15:30

| Army Green | 2–2 | Minerva Academy |
|---|---|---|
| Linesh PV; PC Lallawmkina (pen.) | Report | 48', 75' (pen.) Marcus Lopez |

Harbaksh Stadium, Delhi

3 September 2016
16:30

| Gangtok Himalayan | 1–5 | Sporting Goa |
|---|---|---|
| Rishabh Sharma 19' | Report | 4' Cajetan Fernandes; 17' Masceranhas; 33', 55' Victorino Fernandes; 45+2' Ganesh Thakur |

Ambedkar Stadium, Delhi

4 September 2016
16:30

| DSK Shivajians | 1–2 | Minerva Academy |
|---|---|---|
| | Report |

Ambedkar Stadium, Delhi

5 September 2016
16:30

| DSK Shivajians | 2–1 | Army Green |
|---|---|---|
| | Report |

Ambedkar Stadium, Delhi

6 September 2016
17:45

| Gangtok Himalayan | 2–1 | Indian Navy |

Harbaksh Stadium, Delhi

7 September 2016
17:45

| Sporting Goa | 3–2 | Minerva |
|---|---|---|
| | Report |

Ambedkar Stadium, Delhi

7 September 2016
18:45

| Gangtok Himalayan | 0–1 | Army Green |

Ambedkar Stadium, Delhi

=== Group B ===
| Pos | Team | Pld | W | D | L | GF | GA | GD | Pts | Qualification |
|---|---|---|---|---|---|---|---|---|---|---|
| 1 | Aizawl | 5 | 3 | 1 | 1 | 6 | 3 | +3 | 10 | Advance to Semi-finals |
| 2 | NEROCA | 5 | 2 | 3 | 0 | 7 | 4 | +3 | 9 | Advance to Semi-finals |
| 3 | Dempo | 5 | 2 | 1 | 2 | 13 | 6 | +7 | 7 | |
| 4 | Army Red | 5 | 1 | 3 | 1 | 7 | 7 | 0 | 6 | |
| 5 | Indian Air Force | 5 | 0 | 3 | 2 | 4 | 6 | −2 | 3 | |
| 6 | Real Kashmir | 5 | 0 | 3 | 2 | 12 | 6 | +6 | 3 | |

29 August 2016
15:30

| Aizawl | 3–1 | Dempo |
|---|---|---|
| Bright Mends 18', 30'; Vanlalduatsanga 61' | | 88' |

Harbaksh Stadium, Delhi

29 August 2016
18:45

| NEROCA | 2–0 | Real Kashmir |
|---|---|---|
| Ashok Moirangmayum; Meetei |

Ambedkar Stadium, Delhi

30 August 2016
16:30

| Army Red | 2–2 | Indian Air Force |
|---|---|---|
| C Lallianmawia 30'; P Jain 85' | | Sourav Shadu Khan; Arshpreet Singh |

Ambedkar Stadium, Delhi

31 August 2016
18:45

| Dempo | 1–1 | NEROCA |
|---|---|---|
| Mario Mascarenhas 65' | | 3' Sushil Kumar Singh |

Ambedkar Stadium, Delhi

1 September 2016
16:30

| Dempo | 1–2 | Army Red |
|---|---|---|
| Mario Mascarenhas 67' | | 52' C Lallianmawia; 90+4' Francis Zonunthnga |

Ambedkar Stadium, Delhi

2 September 2016
14:00

| Aizawl | 1–0 | Indian Air Force |
|---|---|---|
| Bright Mends 35' |

Ambedkar Stadium, Delhi

2 September 2016
18:45

| Army Red | 1–1 | Real Kashmir |
|---|---|---|
| Sinenlo Kath Rengma 82' | | 59' Sheikh Rasool |

Ambedkar Stadium, Delhi

3 September 2016
18:45

| Aizawl | 0–1 | NEROCA |
|---|---|---|
| | | 11' David Lalbiakzara |

Ambedkar Stadium, Delhi

4 September 2016
15:30

| Dempo | 9–1 | Real Kashmir |

Ambedkar Stadium, Delhi

4 September 2016
18:45

| Indian Air Force | 1–1 | NEROCA |

Harbaksh Stadium, Delhi

5 September 2016
17:45

| Aizawl | 1–0 | Army Red |
|---|---|---|
| Bright Mends 52' |

Ambedkar Stadium, Delhi

6 September 2016

| Indian Air Force | 1–1 | Real Kashmir |

Ambedkar Stadium, Delhi

7 September 2016

| Dempo | 1–1 | Indian Air Force |

Ambedkar Stadium, Delhi

7 September 2016

| NEROCA | 2–2 | Army Red |

Ambedkar Stadium, Delhi

8 September 2016

| Aizawl | 1–1 | Real Kashmir |

Ambedkar Stadium, Delhi

== Bracket ==
Semi-finals
DSK Shivajians | 0
NEROCA | 3
Aizawl | 3(2)
Army Green | 3(4)

Final
NEROCA | 0(5)
Army Green | 0(6)

== Semi-finals ==
9 September 2016
16.00

| DSK Shivajians | 0–3 | NEROCA |
|---|---|---|
| | Report | 36' Sushil Kumar Singh; 65' Meetei; 90+3' Anandkumar Singh |

Ambedkar Stadium, Delhi

9 September 2016
19:00

| Aizawl | 3–3 (a.e.t.) | Army Green |
Penalties
| | 2–4 |

Ambedkar Stadium, Delhi

== Final ==
11 September 2016
17:00

| NEROCA | 0–0 (a.e.t.) | Army Green |
|---|---|---|
| | Report |
Penalties
| | 5–6 |

Ambedkar Stadium, Delhi
