= Ian Nekati =

Zimbabwean footballer (born 1989)

Ian Nakati
Personal information
- Full name: Ian Samuel Nakati
- Date of birth: 7 August 1989 (age 37)
- Place of birth: Harare, Zimbabwe
- Height: 1.70 m (5 ft 7 in)
- Position: Defender

Team information
- Current team: Chicken Inn

Senior career*
Years	Team	Apps	(Gls)
2012–2013	Twalumba F.C.		
2013–2018	F.C. Platinum		
2018–2020	ZPC Kariba	34	(0)
2020–2022	Chicken Inn		
2022–	United Sports		

International career^{‡}
2019–	Zimbabwe	9	(0)
- * Club domestic league appearances and goals as of 20 January 2021 ‡ National team caps and goals as of 20 January 2021

Ian Samuel Nekati (born 7 August 1989) is a Zimbabwean footballer who plays as a defender for Chicken Inn and the Zimbabwe national football team.

In 2022, Nekati moved to India and appeared with Calcutta Football League club United SC.

== Career ==
=== Club ===
In 2013, Nekati joined F.C. Platinum, spending five years there but not failing to register consistent minutes, prompting a move to ZPC Kariba. Following the expiry of his contract with ZPC Kariba, Nekati was set to join South African club Cape Town City, but contract length disagreements halted the transfer. As a result, he remained in Zimbabwe, signing for Chicken Inn.

=== International ===
Nekati made his senior international debut on 4 August 2019 in a 3–1 victory over Mauritius during 2020 African Nations Championship qualification. For the 2020 African Nations Championship, Nekati was named as Zimbabwe's captain.

== Career statistics ==
=== International ===
As of matches played 4 September 2019.

National team	Year	Apps	Goals
Zimbabwe	2018	7	0
Zimbabwe	2019	1	0
Zimbabwe	2019	1	0
Total		9	0
