= 2009 Durand Cup =

122nd edition of the Durand Cup

Durand Cup
Tournament details
- Country: India
- Venue(s): Ambedkar Stadium, Delhi
- Dates: 11–22 September 2009
- Teams: 12

Final positions
- Champions: Churchill Brothers (2nd title)
- Runners-up: Mohun Bagan

Tournament statistics
- Matches played: 15
- Goals scored: 34 (2.27 per match)
- Top goal scorer: Odafa Onyeka Okolie (5 goals)

The 2009 Durand Cup was the 122nd edition of the Durand Cup, the oldest football tournament in Asia. It began on 11 September 2009 and concluded on 22 September. All matches were played at the Ambedkar Stadium, Delhi. Nine I-League teams were scheduled to take part. The qualifiers were held starting on 2 September, with the final on 20 September. Two teams from the qualifier joined to make it a 12 team battle in the quarterfinals.

Participating teams included reigning champions Mahindra United, Churchill Brothers, Army XI, Sporting Goa, Air India, Dempo, JCT and newly promoted Shillong Lajong. Mohun Bagan and East Bengal had not been part of the Durand Cup in previous years, but according to DFTS Secretary General Major S.S. Maan, they were expected to participate. Churchill Brothers defeated Mohun Bagan 3–1 in the final to win the trophy for their second time.

== Qualification ==
=== Round one ===
16 teams played a one-off match to determine the 8 clubs to reach the second qualifying round.

Date	team	Score	team
02–09–09	Simla Youngs	3–1	BEG Rurkee
02–09–09	Indian Navy	0–0 (3–4 p)	Amity United
03–09–09	Indian National	0–4	Gorkha Regiment RC
03–09–09	Border Security Force	2–0	Jammu &Kashmir Bank
04–09–09	Army Supply Corps, Bangalore	2–1	New Delhi Heroes
04–09–09	MEG, Bangalore	0–3	Assam Rifles
05–09–09	Army Juniors	3–0	Ahbab FC, Delhi
05–09–09	ONGC	2–1	Indian Air Force XI

=== Round two ===
8 teams play a one-off match to determine 4 clubs to advance to the third qualifying stage.

Date	team	Score	team
06–09–09	Simla Youngs	2–2 (5–4 p)	Amity United
07–09–09	Gorkha Regiment RC	1–3	Border Security Force
06–09–09	Army Supply Corps, Bangalore	0–3	Assam Rifles
07–09–09	Army Juniors	0–2	ONGC

=== Round Three ===
4 clubs remain, 2 will advance to the group stage

Date	team	Score	team
08–09–09	Simla Youngs	1–4	Assam Rifles
09–09–09	Border Security Force	0–1	ONGC

== Group stage ==
Group A	Group B	Group C	Group D
Sporting Goa; Churchill Brothers; Assam Rifles	Mohun Bagan; JCT; ONGC	Air India; Dempo; Army XI	Mahindra United; East Bengal; Shillong Lajong

== Tables & Results ==
=== Group A ===
Team	Pld	W	D	L	GF	GA	GD	Pts
(India) Churchill Brothers	2	1	1	0	2	1	+1	4
(India) Sporting Goa	2	1	0	1	2	1	+1	3
(India) Assam Rifles	2	0	1	1	1	3	−2	1

12 September 2009	Sporting Goa	2–0	Assam Rifles	Delhi
	Obagbemiro 20', 90'	Report		Stadium: Ambedkar Stadium; Referee: Bikramjit

15 September 2009	Churchill Brothers	1–0	Sporting Goa	Delhi
	Okolie 82'	Report		Stadium: Ambedkar Stadium

17 September 2009	Assam Rifles	1–1	Churchill Brothers	Delhi
	Meikingai Kamei 55'	Report	Rai 71'	Stadium: Ambedkar Stadium

=== Group B ===
Team	Pld	W	D	L	GF	GA	GD	Pts
(India) Mohun Bagan	2	2	0	0	7	1	+6	6
(India) JCT	2	1	0	1	1	2	-1	3
(India) ONGC	2	0	0	2	1	6	−5	0

13 September 2009	JCT	1–0	ONGC	Delhi
	Sahni 62'	Report		Stadium: Ambedkar Stadium

16 September 2009	ONGC	1–5	Mohun Bagan	Delhi
	Chukwuma Udofia 82'	Report	IS Singh 9', 90+2'; Edeh 16', 77'; Barreto 43'	Stadium: Ambedkar Stadium

18 September 2009	Mohun Bagan	2–0	JCT	Delhi
	Barreto 4', 15'	Report		Stadium: Ambedkar Stadium

=== Group C ===
Team	Pld	W	D	L	GF	GA	GD	Pts
(India) Dempo	2	2	0	0	5	1	+4	6
Air India	2	1	0	1	2	4	−2	3
(India) Army XI	2	0	0	2	0	4	−4	0

11 September 2009	Air India	3–0	Army XI	Delhi
	R. Singh 23' (pen.), 34' (pen.); Opara 28'	Report		Stadium: Ambedkar Stadium

14 September 2009	Dempo	4–1	Air India	Delhi
	Carvalho 28'; Martins 60'; Chhetri 69' (pen.); Beto 89'	Report	Opara 90+'	Stadium: Ambedkar Stadium; Referee: P. K. Bose

17 September 2009	Army XI	0–1	Dempo	Delhi
		Report	Martins 59'	Stadium: Ambedkar Stadium

=== Group D ===
Team	Pld	W	D	L	GF	GA	GD	Pts
(India) Mahindra United	2	1	1	0	2	0	+2	4
(India) Shillong Lajong	2	1	1	0	1	0	+1	4
(India) East Bengal	2	0	0	2	0	3	−3	0

14 September 2009	Mahindra United	0–0	Shillong Lajong	Delhi
		Report		Stadium: Ambedkar Stadium

16 September 2009	Shillong Lajong	1–0	East Bengal	Delhi
	Lyngshing 61'	Report		Stadium: Ambedkar Stadium

18 September 2009	East Bengal	0–2	Mahindra United	Delhi
		Report	Rafi 63', 66'	Stadium: Ambedkar Stadium

== Semi-finals ==
19 September 2009
17:30

Churchill Brothers	2–1	Dempo
Rai 21'; Okolie 50'	Report	Beto 83'

Ambedkar Stadium, New Delhi
Referee: A. Rowan

20 September 2009
17:30

Mahindra United	1–2	Mohun Bagan
Rafi 70'	Report	Edeh 19', 77'

Ambedkar Stadium, New Delhi
Referee: Dinesh Nair

== Final ==
22 September 2009
17:30

Churchill Brothers	3–1 (a.e.t.)	Mohun Bagan
Okolie 100', 104', 110'	Report	Edeh 94'

Ambedkar Stadium, Delhi
Referee: P. K. Bose (Madhya Pradesh)
