= Durand Cup =

Oldest association football tournament in Asia

- Organiser(s): Durand Football Tournament Society; AIFF
- Founded: 1888; 138 years ago
- Region: India
- Teams: 24
- Current champions: East Bengal (17th title)
- Most championships: Mohun Bagan SG; East Bengal (17 titles each)
- Broadcaster(s): Sony Sports; SonyLIV (online streaming)
- Motto: A Saga of Enduring Glory; Many Champions. One Legacy. The quest for a lasting legacy
- Website: durandcup.in
- 2026 Durand Cup

The Durand Cup is an annual football competition in India which was first held in 1888 in Annadale, Shimla, Himachal Pradesh. Hosted by the Durand Football Tournament Society (DFTS) and the All India Football Federation (AIFF), it is the oldest existing club football tournament in Asia and the fifth oldest (Note: There are numerous claims in the list of oldest football competitions, listed as per national cup competitions, following the FA Cup (1871), the Scottish Cup (1874), the Welsh Cup (1877) and the Irish Cup (1881).) national football competition in the world. The tournament currently serves as the curtain raiser for every Indian football season. It is open for any national club, with guest invitee teams from different sections of the Indian Armed Forces, keeping the century long tradition intact.

Since the inception of the Federation Cup, it became merely an exhibition tournament with invitational participations. However, from 2022 all the Indian Super League and majority of the I-League clubs participate. The tournament indicates the beginning of an Indian football season across all divisions. The premier domestic cup status and the AFC Champions League Two spot belong to the Super Cup.

The tournament is named after its founder Henry Mortimer Durand, the foreign secretary of the British Raj from 1884 to 1894. It first began as a football tournament for different departments and regiments of the armed forces of India and the princely states. Since the independence, the army's presence is maintained by the participation of different regiments as guest invitees. Army Green became the latest army team to win the competition in 2016.

== History ==
=== Foundation ===
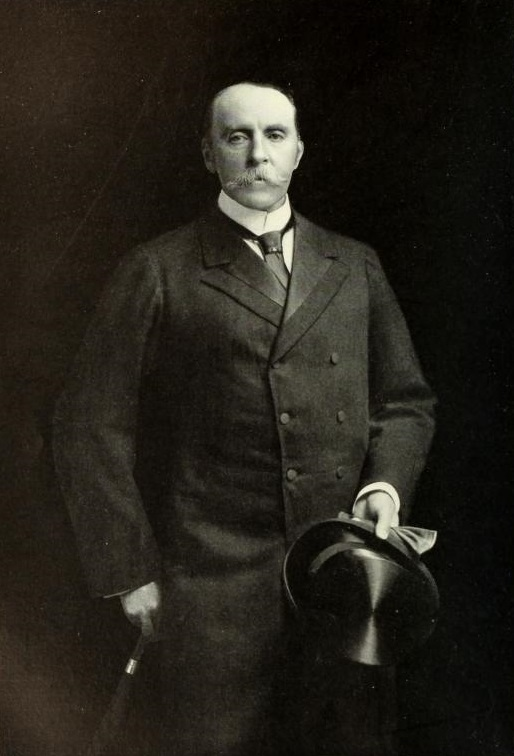
Henry Mortimer Durand

The Durand Football Tournament was started by Henry Mortimer Durand in 1888. Sir Henry was recuperating from illness in Shimla in North India. Having become conscious of the value of sport as a means to maintain health, he decided to present a prize to encourage sporting competition in India. In 1940, the venue of the tournament was shifted to New Delhi.

=== British Raj era ===
The Durand tournament was initially a military affair, open to the British Armed Forces, the Indian Army and other armed units such as provincial frontier-security regiments and the volunteer regiments of the reserves. In practice, however, the native soldiers traditionally preferred field hockey to football, a fact which has been evident from the Indian and Pakistani dominance of that sport in international events such as the Olympics. The exception to this tradition were the Nepali men of the brigades of Gurkhas. Initially, this tended to leave the field open to the Indian Army until football's popularity took hold and it became the more universal sport it is today.

The matches were played in Dagshai, near Shimla, with the inaugural final becoming a Scottish affair, where the first name on the trophy been inscribed was the Royal Scots Fusiliers, who beat the Highland Light Infantry by 2–1. In 1940 the tournament was relocated to the capital city of New Delhi and, with most military units dispatched in World War II, the tournament was opened to civilian teams so as to maintain the level of competition, wherein Mohammedan became the first civilian team to win the tournament at the Irwin Amphitheater. The tournament would get suspended due to the war, which would soon be followed by the Indian independence movement leading to the partition of India.

=== Post-independence ===
Following the turmoil of in 1947, the Durand Cup was accidentally discovered in the office of Commander-in-Chief Sir Claude Auchinleck and efforts were made in order to shift the tournament to the newly formed Pakistan, but was strongly resisted by the Defence Secretary H.M. Patel, who acquired and stored it in the State Bank of India, ensuring that the Durand Cup remains a part of Indian football. Since then the tournament is hosted by the Durand Football Tournament Society, a registered society at Delhi, presided by the Chief of Defence Staff and chaired by the three Service Chiefs of Indian Armed Forces. At the first edition of the tournament since the independence of India, Hyderabad City Police defeated Mohun Bagan by 1–0 in the replayed final. For the next ten years, the trophy would go on to swap hands frequently among East Bengal FC, Mohun Bagan, Madras Regimental Centre and Hyderabad City Police, who played as Andhra Pradesh Police after 1960. After a year of halt due to Sino-Indian War, the tournament would get dominated by Mohun Bagan and East Bengal, with Border Security Force and JCT FC challenging their dominant run at times. In 1997, FC Kochin became the first South Indian club to get their hands on the Durand Cup.

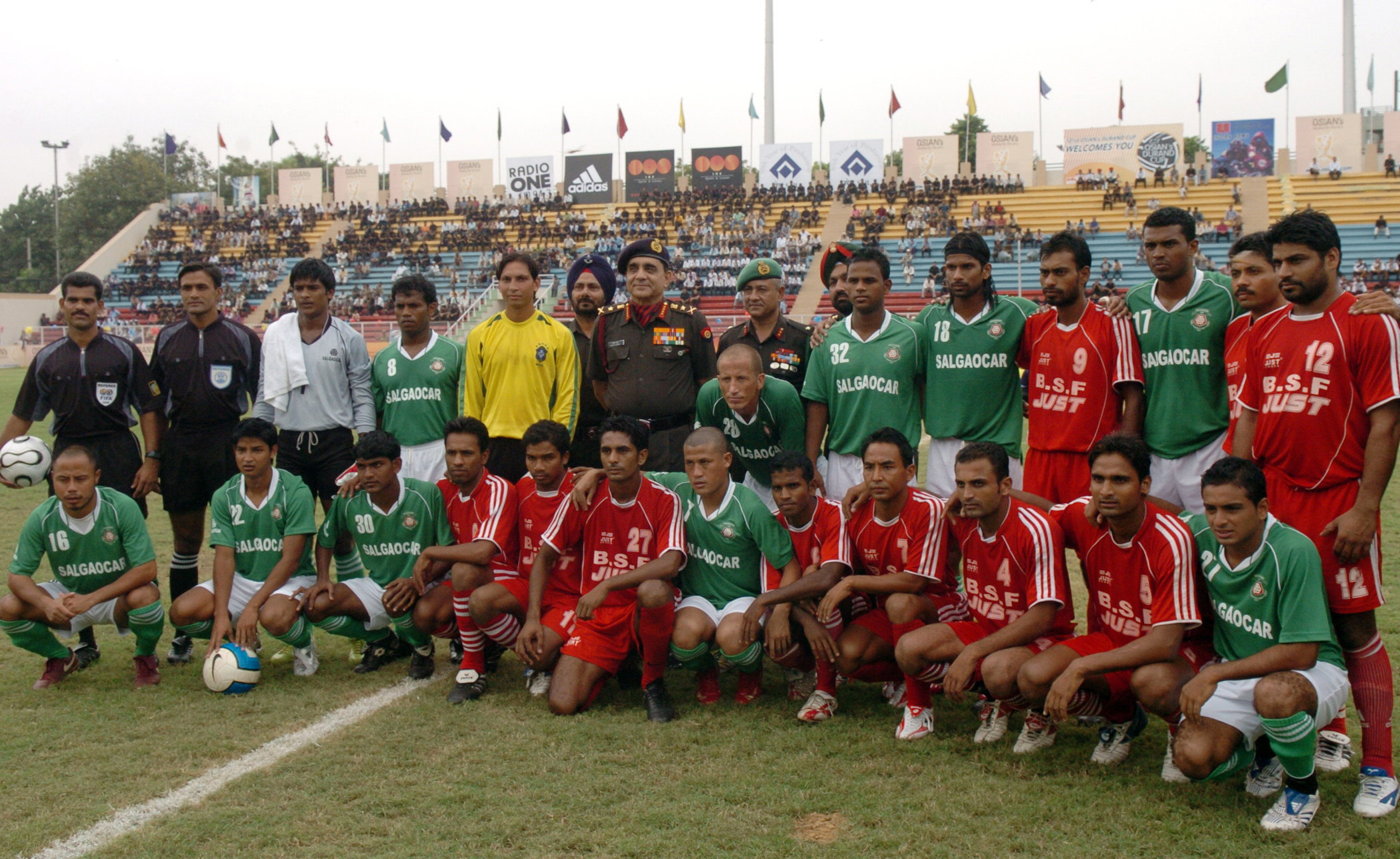
Salgaocar FC (in green) and BSF (in red) players along with the match officials and Chief of the Army Staff Gen. Deepak Kapoor, prior to their Durand Cup match at the Ambedkar Stadium in 2008.

Mahindra United FC won the first title of the 3rd millennium and their second time, following its 1998 win. In 2006, Osian's became the first civilian organisation to co-host the Durand Cup on a 5-year deal with DFTS until 2010, in order to develop the tournament and revive the interest in the game. In the following years however, clubs from Goa produced a run of winning form with clubs like Salgaocar FC, Sporting Clube de Goa, Dempo SC and Churchill Brothers FC Goa. Churchill Brothers FC Goa won the tournament thrice in 2007, 2009 and 2011, and narrowly missed a hat-trick, as runners-up in 2008. Since 2000, only twice the tournament was won by the Indian Armed Force teams – Army XI in 2005 and Army Green in 2016. In 2013, Mohammedan SC would win the tournament for the second time after 73 years and for the first time since the independence of India. Due to lack of adequate response in New Delhi, the following year Durand Cup was relocated to Goa, under the instructions of Minister of Defence Manohar Parrikar. The significance of the tournament had dissipated with time but the Indian Armed Forces kept the Durand Tournament tradition alive for decades. The tournament had been scrapped-off from the Indian football calendar a number of times without any significant reason, for instance in the years 2015, 2017 and 2018.

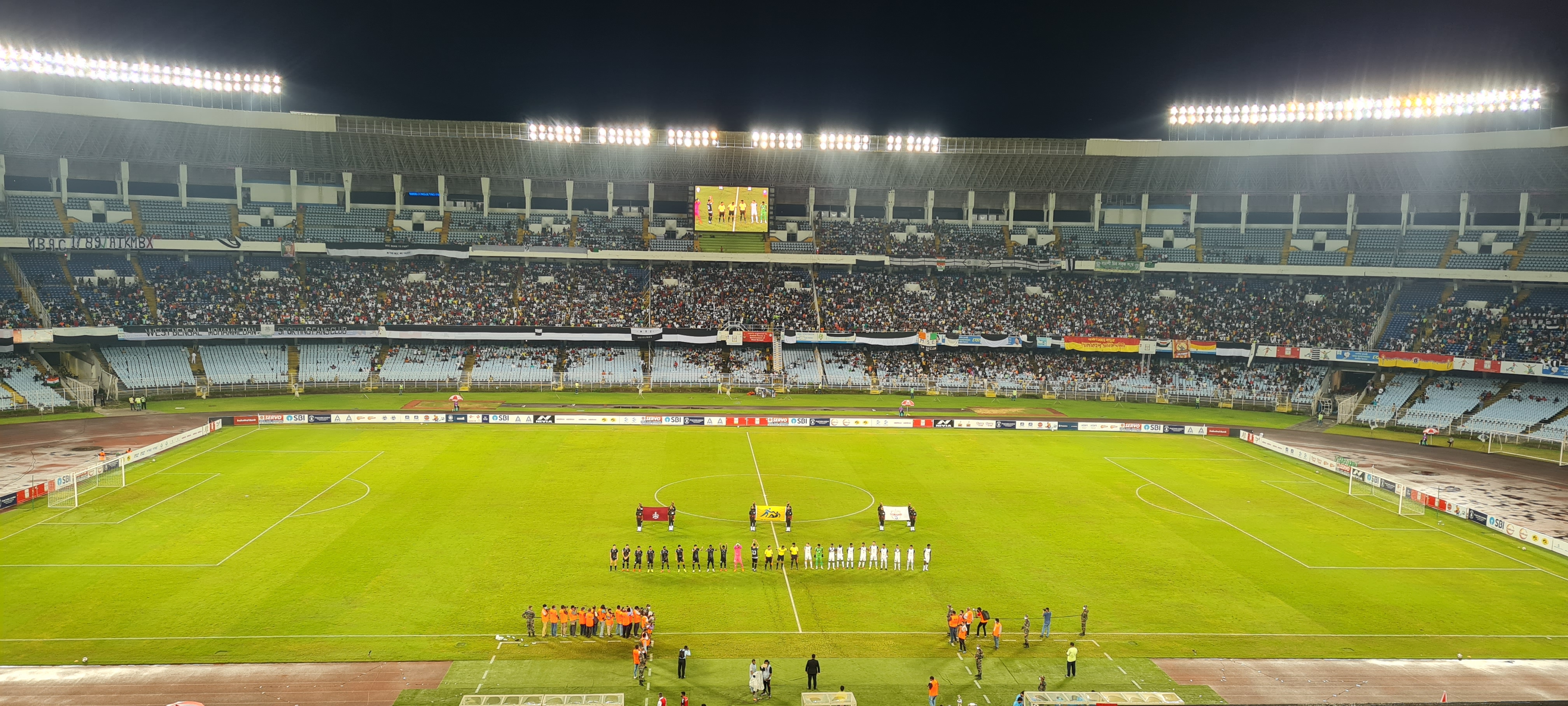
FC Goa (in black) and Mohammedan SC (in white) lined up during the 2021 Durand Cup Final at Vivekananda Yuba Bharati Krirangan.

In 2019, the tournament was jointly organised by the Armed Forces and the Government of West Bengal, thus relocated to West Bengal in favour for higher attendance figures. In that edition, Gokulam Kerala FC became the second football club from Kerala to win the tournament. In 2020, the tournament was cancelled due to the COVID-19 pandemic. In 2021, the Armed Forces decided to host the tournament in West Bengal, jointly with the Government of West Bengal, till 2025. As the significance of the tournament depraved, usually the participating Indian Super League (ISL) clubs would field their respective reserve squads, in order to focus on the more important league games. However, at 130th edition of the tournament, organisers took an effort to revive the legacy and most clubs decided to field full-strength squads. FC Goa became fourth Goan club to win the tournament by defeating Mohammedan SC. The following year, AIFF decided to make Durand Cup a mandatory tournament for all ISL clubs to participate since a club must play at least 27 domestic games to be eligible for AFC competitions, therefore AFC for the first time recognised Durand Cup as one of the cup tournaments of India. Hence, in the 131st edition, for the first time, all the clubs of ISL participated in the tournament along with five invited clubs from I-League and the usual four armed force teams. Due to expansion of the competition, the matches were hosted at more than one venue, alongside Kolkata, which was unprecedented till then.Recent editions of the Durand Cup have yielded notable outcomes, with finals largely hosted at Salt Lake Stadium, Kolkata. In the 131st edition (2022), Bengaluru FC defeated Mumbai City FC 2–1 to secure their maiden title. In the 132nd edition (2023), Mohun Bagan Super Giant overcame Emami East Bengal FC 1–0, ending a 23-year title drought and claiming their 17th championship. In the 133rd edition (2024), NorthEast United FC defeated Mohun Bagan Super Giant in the final to win their first major title. In the 134th edition (2025), NorthEast United FC successfully defended their crown by defeating Diamond Harbour FC, thereby becoming back-to-back champions.

== Competition format ==
While there is no record of the competition's format in its earlier days, currently the Durand Cup is played in two phases: round-robin and knockouts.

A total of 24 teams feature in the group stage round. Each team is allowed to have a maximum of 30 players to complete their rosters.

After the round-robin schedule, top teams from each group would progress into the knockout stage, which culminates with 2 teams facing each other in the finals.

== Trophies ==
Unlike any other football competition around the world, the winning team is presented with three trophies:

- Durand Cup (nicknamed The Masterpiece): the original tournament trophy which became a rolling trophy since 1965
- Shimla Trophy (nicknamed The Artistry): donated by the residents of Shimla in 1904 to show their passion and support for the tournament, the trophy began to be awarded in rolling since 1965
- President's Cup (nicknamed The Pride): a rolling trophy that replaced the Viceroy's Trophy post-independence by the President of India Dr. Rajendra Prasad

== Finals ==
=== Pre-independence era (1888–1947) ===
Year	Winners	Score	Runners-up	Venue	Ref.
1888	(United Kingdom) Royal Scots Fusiliers	2–1	(United Kingdom) Highland Light Infantry	Annadale, Shimla	
1889	(United Kingdom) Highland Light Infantry	8–1	(British Raj) Shimla Rifles (2nd Punjab Volunteer Rifle Corps)	Annadale, Shimla	
1890	(United Kingdom) Highland Light Infantry	0–0 (a.e.t.); 4–2	(United Kingdom) Royal Irish Fusiliers	Annadale, Shimla	
1891	(United Kingdom) King's Own Scottish Borderers	2–1	(United Kingdom) East Lancashire Regiment	Annadale, Shimla	
1892	(United Kingdom) King's Own Scottish Borderers	3–0	(United Kingdom) Argyll and Sutherland Highlanders	Annadale, Shimla	
1893	(United Kingdom) Highland Light Infantry	2–1	(United Kingdom) Argyll and Sutherland Highlanders	Annadale, Shimla	
1894	(United Kingdom) Highland Light Infantry	1–0	(United Kingdom) Royal Scots Fusiliers	Annadale, Shimla	
1895	(United Kingdom) Highland Light Infantry	1–0	(United Kingdom) Somerset Light Infantry	Annadale, Shimla	
1896	(United Kingdom) Somerset Light Infantry	6–1	(United Kingdom) Black Watch	Annadale, Shimla	
1897	(United Kingdom) Black Watch	0–0 (a.e.t.); 4–0	(British Raj) Shimla Rifles (2nd Punjab Volunteer Rifle Corps)	Annadale, Shimla	
1898	(United Kingdom) Black Watch	2–0	(United Kingdom) North Staffordshire Regiment	Annadale, Shimla	
1899	(United Kingdom) Black Watch	2–0	(United Kingdom) Yorkshire Regiment	Annadale, Shimla	
1900	(United Kingdom) South Wales Borderers	2–0	(United Kingdom) East Lancashire Regiment	Annadale, Shimla	
1901	(United Kingdom) South Wales Borderers	2–1	(United Kingdom) South Staffordshire Regiment	Annadale, Shimla	
1902	(United Kingdom) Hampshire Regiment	2–1	(United Kingdom) East Lancashire Regiment	Annadale, Shimla	
1903	(United Kingdom) Royal Irish Rifles	1–0	(United Kingdom) Queen's Regiment	Annadale, Shimla	
1904	(United Kingdom) North Staffordshire Regiment	2–0	(United Kingdom) Black Watch	Annadale, Shimla	
1905	(United Kingdom) Royal Dragoons	1–0	(United Kingdom) Dorset Regiment	Annadale, Shimla	
1906	(United Kingdom) Cameronians (Scottish Rifles)	3–0	(United Kingdom) Bedfordshire and Hertfordshire Regiment	Annadale, Shimla	
1907	(United Kingdom) Cameronians (Scottish Rifles)	1–0 (a.e.t.)	(United Kingdom) Royal Welch Fusiliers	Annadale, Shimla	
1908	(United Kingdom) Lancashire Fusiliers	2–0	(United Kingdom) Royal Irish Rifles	Annadale, Shimla	
1909	(United Kingdom) Lancashire Fusiliers	2–1	(United Kingdom) King's Regiment	Annadale, Shimla	
1910	(United Kingdom) Royal Scots	1–0	(United Kingdom) King's Royal Rifle Corps	Annadale, Shimla	
1911	(United Kingdom) Black Watch	0–0 (a.e.t.); 1–0	(United Kingdom) Lancashire Fusiliers	Annadale, Shimla	
1912	(United Kingdom) Royal Scots	1–0	(United Kingdom) Lancashire Fusiliers	Annadale, Shimla	
1913	(United Kingdom) Lancashire Fusiliers	1–0	(United Kingdom) King's Royal Rifle Corps	Annadale, Shimla	
1914–1919	Tournament not held due to World War I				
1920	(United Kingdom) Black Watch	2–1	(United Kingdom) Cameronians (Scottish Rifles)	Shimla	
1921	(United Kingdom) Worcestershire Regiment	1–0	(United Kingdom) Royal Fusiliers	Shimla	
1922	(United Kingdom) Lancashire Fusiliers	1–0	(United Kingdom) Royal Field Artillery	Shimla	
1923	(United Kingdom) Cheshire Regiment	1–0	(United Kingdom) Essex Regiment	Shimla	
1924	(United Kingdom) Worcestershire Regiment	1–1 (a.e.t.); 2–0	(United Kingdom) Essex Regiment	Shimla	
1925	(United Kingdom) Sherwood Foresters	3–1	(United Kingdom) Worcestershire Regiment	Shimla	
1926	(United Kingdom) Durham Light Infantry	1–0	(United Kingdom) Sherwood Foresters	Shimla	
1927	(United Kingdom) York and Lancaster Regiment	2–0	(British Raj) Eastern Railway	Shimla	
1928	(United Kingdom) Sherwood Foresters	4–2	(United Kingdom) York and Lancaster Regiment	Shimla	
1929	(United Kingdom) York and Lancaster Regiment	3–1	(United Kingdom) East Yorkshire Regiment	Shimla	
1930	(United Kingdom) York and Lancaster Regiment	2–0	(United Kingdom) Royal Leicestershire Regiment	Shimla	
1931	(United Kingdom) Devonshire Regiment	0–0 (a.e.t.); 3–1	(United Kingdom) Border Regiment	Shimla	
1932	(United Kingdom) King's Shropshire Light Infantry	2–1	(United Kingdom) Devonshire Regiment	Shimla	
1933	(United Kingdom) King's Shropshire Light Infantry	2–1	(United Kingdom) Royal Leicestershire Regiment	Shimla	
1934	(United Kingdom) Royal Corps of Signals	3–1	(United Kingdom) Argyll and Sutherland Highlanders	Shimla	
1935	(United Kingdom) Border Regiment	1–0	(United Kingdom) Royal Norfolk Regiment	Shimla	
1936	(United Kingdom) Argyll and Sutherland Highlanders	2–1	(United Kingdom) Green Howards	Shimla	
1937	(United Kingdom) Border Regiment	3–1	(United Kingdom) Royal Scots	Shimla	
1938	(United Kingdom) South Wales Borderers	1–0	(British Raj) Northwestern Railway Loco SC (Lahore)	Shimla	
1939	Tournament not held due to World War II				
1940	(British Raj) Mohammedan	2–1	(United Kingdom) Royal Warwickshire Regiment	Irwin Amphitheatre, New Delhi	
1941–1947	Tournament not held due to World War II & the Partition of India				

=== Post-independence era (1947–present) ===
Year	Winners	Score	Runners-up	Venue	Ref.
1947–1950	Tournament not held post Partition of India				
1950	Hyderabad City Police	2–2 (a.e.t.); 1–0 (a.e.t.)	Mohun Bagan	Delhi Gate Stadium, New Delhi	
1951	East Bengal	1–1 (a.e.t.); 2–1	Rajasthan Armed Constabulary	Delhi Gate Stadium, New Delhi	
1952	East Bengal	1–0	Hyderabad City Police	Delhi Gate Stadium, New Delhi	
1953	Mohun Bagan	4–0	National Defence Academy	Delhi Gate Stadium, New Delhi	
1954	Hyderabad City Police	1–1 (a.e.t.); 1–0	Hindustan Aircraft Limited	Delhi Gate Stadium, New Delhi	
1955	Madras Regimental Centre	0–0 (a.e.t.); 0–0 (a.e.t.); 3–2	Indian Air Force	Delhi Gate Stadium, New Delhi	
1956	East Bengal	2–0	Hyderabad City Police	Delhi Gate Stadium, New Delhi	
1957	Hyderabad City Police	2–1	East Bengal	Delhi Gate Stadium, New Delhi	
1958	Madras Regimental Centre	1–1 (a.e.t.); 2–0	Gorkha Brigade	Delhi Gate Stadium, New Delhi	
1959	Mohun Bagan	1–1 (a.e.t.); 3–1	Mohammedan	Delhi Gate Stadium, New Delhi	
1960	Mohun Bagan and East Bengal	1–1 (a.e.t.); 0–0 (a.e.t.)	–	Corporation Stadium, New Delhi	
1961	Andhra Pradesh Police	1–0	Mohun Bagan	Corporation Stadium, New Delhi	
1962	Tournament not held due to Sino-Indian War				
1963	Mohun Bagan	0–0 (a.e.t.); 2–0	Andhra Pradesh Police	Corporation Stadium, New Delhi	
1964	Mohun Bagan	2–0	East Bengal	Corporation Stadium, New Delhi	
1965	Mohun Bagan	2–0	Punjab Police	Corporation Stadium, New Delhi	
1966	Gorkha Brigade	2–0	Sikh Regimental Centre	Corporation Stadium, New Delhi	
1967	East Bengal	1–0	Bengal Nagpur Railway	Corporation Stadium, New Delhi	
1968	Border Security Force	1–0	East Bengal	Corporation Stadium, New Delhi	
1969	Gorkha Brigade	1–0	Border Security Force	Corporation Stadium, New Delhi	
1970	East Bengal	2–0	Mohun Bagan	Corporation Stadium, New Delhi	
1971	Border Security Force	0–0 (a.e.t.); 1–0	Leaders Club	Corporation Stadium, New Delhi	
1972	East Bengal	0–0 (a.e.t.); 1–0	Mohun Bagan	Corporation Stadium, New Delhi	
1973	Border Security Force	2–1	Rajasthan Armed Constabulary	Corporation Stadium, New Delhi	
1974	Mohun Bagan	3–2	JCT	Corporation Stadium, New Delhi	
1975	Border Security Force	1–0	JCT	Ambedkar Stadium, New Delhi	
1976	Border Security Force and JCT	1–1 (a.e.t.); 0–0 (a.e.t.)	–	Ambedkar Stadium, New Delhi	
1977	Mohun Bagan	1–1 (a.e.t.); 2–1	JCT	Ambedkar Stadium, New Delhi	
1978	East Bengal	3–0	Mohun Bagan	Ambedkar Stadium, New Delhi	
1979	Mohun Bagan	1–0	Punjab Police	Ambedkar Stadium, New Delhi	
1980	Mohun Bagan	1–0	Mohammedan	Ambedkar Stadium, New Delhi	
1981	Border Security Force	1–0	JCT	Ambedkar Stadium, New Delhi	
1982	Mohun Bagan and East Bengal	0–0 (a.e.t.)	–	Ambedkar Stadium, New Delhi	
1983	JCT	1–1 (a.e.t.); 2–1	Mohun Bagan	Ambedkar Stadium, New Delhi	
1984	Mohun Bagan	1–0	East Bengal	Ambedkar Stadium, New Delhi	
1985	Mohun Bagan	0–0 (a.e.t.) (3–2 p)	JCT	Ambedkar Stadium, New Delhi	
1986	Mohun Bagan	1–0	East Bengal	Ambedkar Stadium, New Delhi	
1987	JCT	1–0	Mohun Bagan	Ambedkar Stadium, New Delhi	
1988	Border Security Force	3–2	East Bengal	Ambedkar Stadium, New Delhi	
1989	East Bengal	0–0 (a.e.t.) (3–1 p)	Mohun Bagan	Ambedkar Stadium, New Delhi	
1990	East Bengal	3–2	Mahindra & Mahindra	Ambedkar Stadium, New Delhi	
1991	East Bengal	1–1 (a.e.t.) (5–3 p)	Border Security Force	Ambedkar Stadium, New Delhi	
1992	JCT	1–0	Mohammedan	Ambedkar Stadium, New Delhi	
1993	East Bengal	1–0	Punjab State Electricity Board	Ambedkar Stadium, New Delhi	
1994	Mohun Bagan	1–0	East Bengal	Ambedkar Stadium, New Delhi	
1995	East Bengal	0–0 (a.e.t.) (4–3 p)	Tata Football Academy	Ambedkar Stadium, New Delhi	
1996	JCT	1–0	(Iraq) Al-Naft	Ambedkar Stadium, New Delhi	
1997	Kochin	3–1	Mohun Bagan	Ambedkar Stadium, New Delhi	
1998	Mahindra & Mahindra	2–1	East Bengal	Ambedkar Stadium, New Delhi	
1999	Salgaocar	0–0 (a.e.t.) (3–2 p)	East Bengal	Ambedkar Stadium, New Delhi	
2000	Mohun Bagan	1–1 (Golden goal)	Mahindra United	Ambedkar Stadium, New Delhi	
2001	Mahindra United	5–0	Churchill Brothers	Ambedkar Stadium, New Delhi	
2002	East Bengal	3–0	Army XI	Ambedkar Stadium, New Delhi	
2003	Salgaocar	1–1 (a.e.t.) (4–3 p)	East Bengal	Ambedkar Stadium, New Delhi	
2004	East Bengal	2–1	Mohun Bagan	Ambedkar Stadium, New Delhi	
2005	Army XI	0–0 (a.e.t.) (5–4 p)	Sporting Goa	Ambedkar Stadium, New Delhi	
2006	Dempo	1–0	JCT	Ambedkar Stadium, New Delhi	
2007	Churchill Brothers	1–0	Mahindra United	Ambedkar Stadium, New Delhi	
2008	Mahindra United	3–2 (a.e.t.)	Churchill Brothers	Ambedkar Stadium, New Delhi	
2009	Churchill Brothers	3–1 (a.e.t.)	Mohun Bagan	Ambedkar Stadium, New Delhi	
2010	Chirag United	1–0	JCT	Ambedkar Stadium, New Delhi	
2011	Churchill Brothers	0–0 (a.e.t.) (5–4 p)	Prayag United	Ambedkar Stadium, New Delhi	
2012	Air India	0–0 (a.e.t.) (3–2 p)	Dodsal	Ambedkar Stadium, New Delhi	
2013	Mohammedan	2–1	ONGC	Ambedkar Stadium, New Delhi	
2014	Salgaocar	1–0	Pune	Ambedkar Stadium, New Delhi	
2015	Tournament not held				
2016	Army Green	0–0 (a.e.t.) (6–5 p)	NEROCA	Ambedkar Stadium, New Delhi	
2017–2018	Tournament not held				
2019	Gokulam Kerala	2–1	Mohun Bagan	Vivekananda Yuba Bharati Krirangan, Kolkata	
2020	Tournament not held due to COVID-19 pandemic				
2021	Goa	1–0 (a.e.t.)	Mohammedan	Vivekananda Yuba Bharati Krirangan, Kolkata	
2022	Bengaluru	2–1	Mumbai City	Vivekananda Yuba Bharati Krirangan, Kolkata	
2023	Mohun Bagan	1–0	East Bengal	Vivekananda Yuba Bharati Krirangan, Kolkata	
2024	NorthEast United	2–2 (4–3 p)	Mohun Bagan	Vivekananda Yuba Bharati Krirangan, Kolkata	
2025	NorthEast United	6–1	Diamond Harbour	Vivekananda Yuba Bharati Krirangan, Kolkata	
2026	East Bengal	4–1	Mohun Bagan	Vivekananda Yuba Bharati Krirangan, Kolkata	

== Performance by teams ==
Team	Champions	Runners-up	Last win
Mohun Bagan	17	14	2023
East Bengal	17	11	2026
Border Security Force	7	2	1988
JCT	5	7	1996
(United Kingdom) Black Watch	5	2	1920
(United Kingdom) Highland Light Infantry	5	1	1895
Hyderabad City Police / Andhra Pradesh Police	4	3	1961
(United Kingdom) Lancashire Fusiliers	4	2	1922
Mahindra United / Mahindra & Mahindra	3	3	2008
Churchill Brothers	3	2	2011
(United Kingdom) York and Lancaster Regiment	3	1	1930
Salgaocar	3	0	2014
(United Kingdom) South Wales Borderers	3	0	1938
Mohammedan	2	4	2013
Gorkha Brigade	2	1	1969
(United Kingdom) Border Regiment	2	1	1937
(United Kingdom) Sherwood Foresters	2	1	1928
(United Kingdom) Worcestershire Regiment	2	1	1924
(United Kingdom) Royal Scots	2	1	1912
(United Kingdom) Cameronians (Scottish Rifles)	2	1	1907
NorthEast United	2	0	2025
Madras Regimental Centre	2	0	1958
(United Kingdom) King's Shropshire Light Infantry	2	0	1933
(United Kingdom) King's Own Scottish Borderers	2	0	1892
(United Kingdom) Argyll & Sutherland Highlanders	1	3	1936
Chirag United / Prayag United	1	1	2010
Army XI / Army Red	1	1	2005
(United Kingdom) Devonshire Regiment	1	1	1931
(United Kingdom) North Staffordshire Regiment	1	1	1904
(United Kingdom) Royal Irish Rifles	1	1	1903
(United Kingdom) Somerset Light Infantry	1	1	1896
(United Kingdom) Royal Scots Fusiliers	1	1	1888
Bengaluru	1	0	2022
Goa	1	0	2021
Gokulam Kerala	1	0	2019
Army Green	1	0	2016
Air India	1	0	2012
Dempo	1	0	2006
Kochin	1	0	1997
(United Kingdom) Royal Corps of Signals	1	0	1934
(United Kingdom) Durham Light Infantry	1	0	1926
(United Kingdom) Cheshire Regiment	1	0	1923
(United Kingdom) Royal Dragoons	1	0	1905
(United Kingdom) Hampshire Regiment	1	0	1902

=== Records ===
- Most wins: 17,
  - Mohun Bagan SG (1953, 1959, 1960, 1963, 1964, 1965, 1974, 1977, 1979, 1980, 1982, 1984, 1985, 1986, 1994, 2000, 2023)
  - East Bengal (1951, 1952, 1956, 1960, 1967, 1970, 1972, 1978, 1982, 1989, 1990, 1991, 1993, 1995, 2002, 2004, 2026)
- Most consecutive wins: 3, joint record:
  - Mohun Bagan SG (1963, 1964, 1965 and 1984, 1985, 1986)
  - East Bengal (1989, 1990, 1991)
  - Highland Light Infantry (1893, 1894, 1895)
  - Black Watch (1897, 1898, 1899)
- Most appearances: 56
  - East Bengal (1926, 1950, 1951, 1952, 1953, 1954, 1955, 1956, 1957, 1958, 1959, 1960, 1961, 1963, 1964, 1965, 1966, 1967, 1968, 1969, 1970, 1972, 1973, 1974, 1975, 1976, 1977, 1978, 1982, 1984, 1986, 1987, 1988, 1989, 1990, 1991, 1992, 1993, 1994, 1995, 1998, 1999, 2000, 2001, 2002, 2003, 2004, 2005, 2006, 2009, 2010, 2019, 2022, 2023, 2024, 2025)
  - Mohun Bagan SG (1950, 1953, 1959, 1960, 1961, 1963, 1964, 1965, 1970, 1972, 1974, 1977, 1978, 1979, 1980, 1982, 1983, 1984, 1985, 1986, 1987, 1989, 1994, 1997, 2000, 2004, 2009, 2019, 2022, 2023, 2024)
- Most finals appearances without ever winning: 3
  - East Lancashire Regiment (1880, 1900, 1902)
- Most appearances without ever losing: 3, joint record:
  - Salgaocar (1999, 2003, 2014)
  - South Wales Borderers (1900, 1901, 1938)
- Biggest final win:
  - Highland Light Infantry 8–1 Shimla Rifles (2nd Punjab Volunteer Rifle Corps) (1889)
- Highest scoring final: 9:
  - Highland Light Infantry 8–1 Shimla Rifles (2nd Punjab Volunteer Rifle Corps) (1889)

== See also ==
- List of football clubs in India
- Indian football league system
- Football in India
- IFA Shield
- Bordoloi Trophy
- I-League 2
- I-League 3
- State leagues
- Institutional League
