= Nacimento Silveira =

Indian footballer

Personal information
- Full name: Nacimento Silveira
- Date of birth: 11 April 1981 (age 45)
- Place of birth: Goa, India
- Height: 1.72 m (5 ft 7 1/2 in)
- Position: Midfielder

Team information
- Current team: United Sports Club

Senior career*
| Years | Team | Apps | (Gls) |
| 2011–present | United Sports Club | 0 | (0) |
- * Club domestic league appearances and goals

Nacimento Silveira (born 11 April 1981) is an Indian football player who plays in Midfield position for I-League team United Sports Club.
