= United SC =

Association football club in India

- Full name: United Sports Club
- Nicknames: The Peafowls; Purple Brigade
- Short name: USC
- Founded: 1927; 99 years ago (as Eveready Association Club)
- Ground: Kalyani Stadium
- Capacity: 20,000
- Chairman: Nabab Bhattacharya
- Head coach: Lal Kamal Bhowmik
- League: I-League 2; Calcutta Football League
- Website: theunitedsportsclub.in
Home colours	Away colours	Third colours

United Sports Club (Bengali: ইউনাইটেড স্পোর্টস ক্লাব) is a professional football club based in Kolkata, West Bengal, India. United SC was founded in 1927. The club competes in the I-League 2, as well as the Calcutta Football League, the oldest football league in Asia.

United SC soon emerged as one of the most successful teams from the state in 2010s, after Mohun Bagan and East Bengal. The club previously participated in I-League, which was then top flight of Indian football league system. The club mostly uses Kalyani Stadium as home ground.

== History ==
=== 1927–2009 ===
United SC was originally established in 1927 as Eveready Association Club. Since then, they participated in fewer editions of the Calcutta Football League. The club has a tradition of bringing up local and unknown talents from various parts of Bengal. In 2003, they lifted their first trophy All Airlines Gold Cup, defeating Mohun Bagan 2–1. In 2004, they emerged victorious in the Sikkim Governor's Gold Cup, defeating ANFA XI in final by 4–2 in penalty-shootout, after the game ended 1–1. During the 2005–06 season, they participated in Kalinga Cup in Odisha and reached the final, defeating Bangladeshi side Badda Jagoroni Sangsad by 4–2. They clinched the title defeating Cuttack SSH 2–0. Eveready Association also reached the final of the 111th edition of IFA Shield but lost 1–5 to Bayern Munich II at the end.

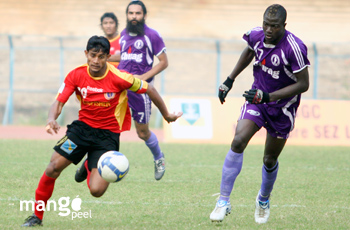
Chirag United players (in purple) in action with East Bengal FC during the 2008–09 I-League.

In 2006, the club was renamed as United Sports Club to attract a title sponsor and the football division owned by United Sport Football Team Private Ltd. Later, veteran manager Amal Dutta was roped in as head coach in place of Belgian Philippe De Ridder. With the inflow of sponsorship, the club clinched promotion to the first division of the I-League in 2007. Previously the club has competed in the National Football League (India) before joining the newly formed I-League. Later in 2009, they roped in Subrata Bhattacharya as head coach.

=== 2010–2020 ===
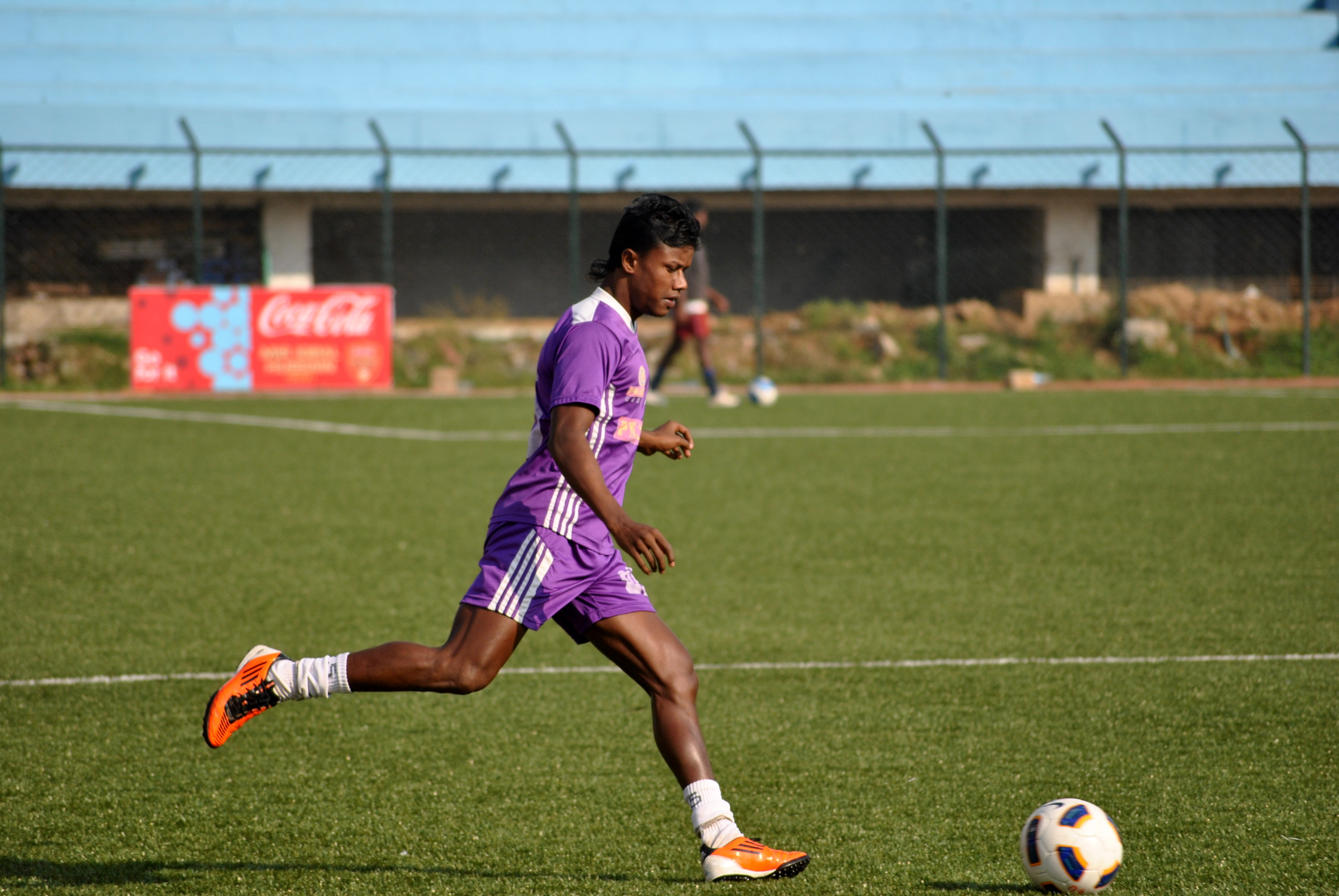
Shankar Oraon during the club's preseason training in 2011.

Prayag United participated in the 123rd edition of the Durand Cup in 2010. United emerged champion at the Ambedkar Stadium with a 1–0 tie-break win over JCT FC. For the 2010–11 I-League season, United SC played at the Salt Lake Stadium in Kolkata. On Indian Transfer deadline day United SC made headline news by signing India national football team striker Sunil Chhetri until the end of the season. On 3 April 2011, Chhetri scored his first goal for Chirag United against Dempo, however, Dempo won the match 4–2. Chhetri then scored a brace on 29 April 2011 against ONGC to help salvage a 2–2 draw for Chirag. In June 2011 after the I-League season ended, old sponsors Chirag chose to cut ties with United SC and thus Chirag United SC became Prayag United Sports Club. Even though the team has lost a lot in terms of sponsorship money the club is still able to sign and retain their current players.

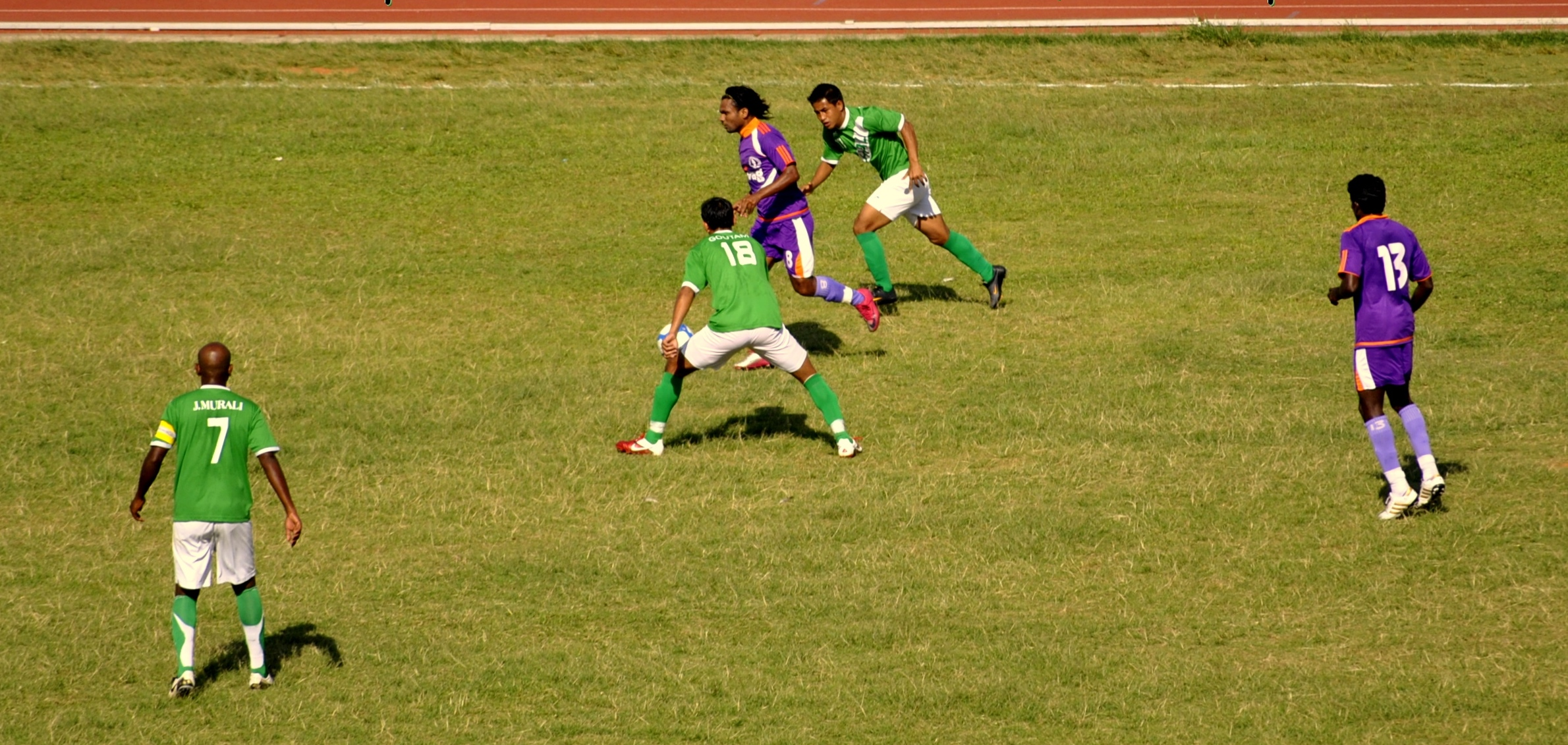
Lalkamal Bhowmick of Chirag United, making an early inroad against HAL SC during the 2010–11 I-League.

On 3 August 2011, it was announced that United Sports Club had signed a sponsorship deal with Prayag Group and on 7 August 2011 United Sports Club officially changed their name to Prayag United SC. In October, the club narrowly missed the opportunity of winning the Durand Cup, after a 5–4 defeat to Churchill Brothers. The association, however was cancelled in the summer of the 2013, when the company found itself involved in the chit-fund scam. The name was again changed to United Sports Club.

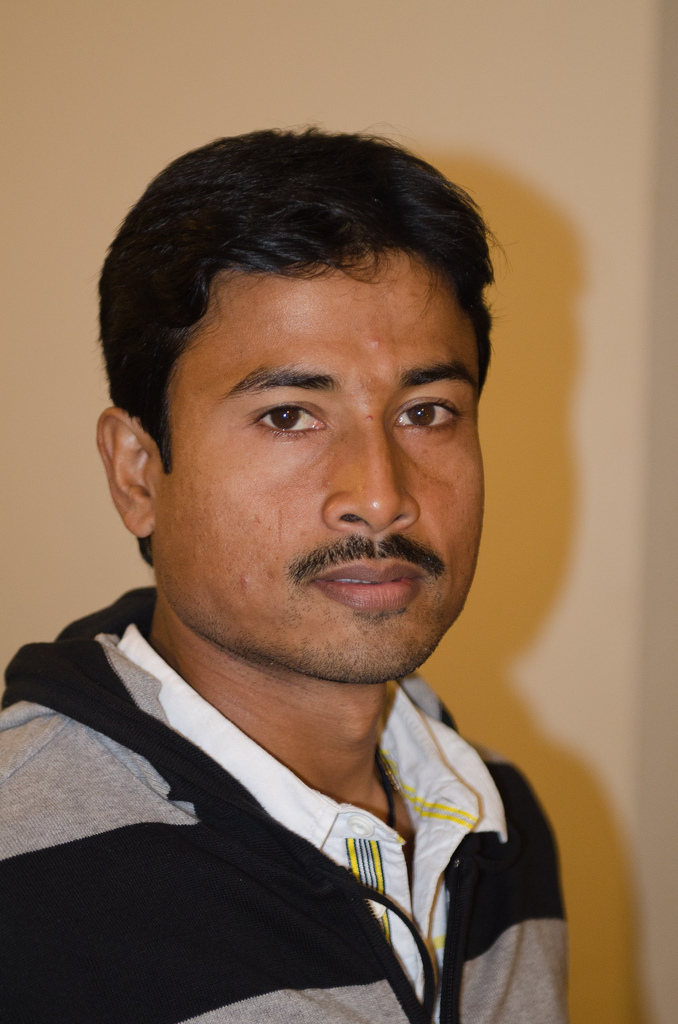
United SC player Abhijit Mondal in 2011

Dutchman Eelco Schattorie managed his first game for them on 10 November 2012, where he led Prayag to a 10–1 victory over newly promoted United Sikkim. Schattorie won his first and only cup for the side on 20 March 2013 when Prayag United defeated East Bengal in the IFA Shield final 1–0 through a Ranti Martins goal. The following season in the I-League, They thrashed Air India FC by 5–1 margin, and eventually finished the 2012–13 campaign leading Prayag United to a fourth-place finish with 44 points. In that season, they emerged as the runners-up of the 2012 IFA Shield, losing to East Bengal by 4–2 on penalties.

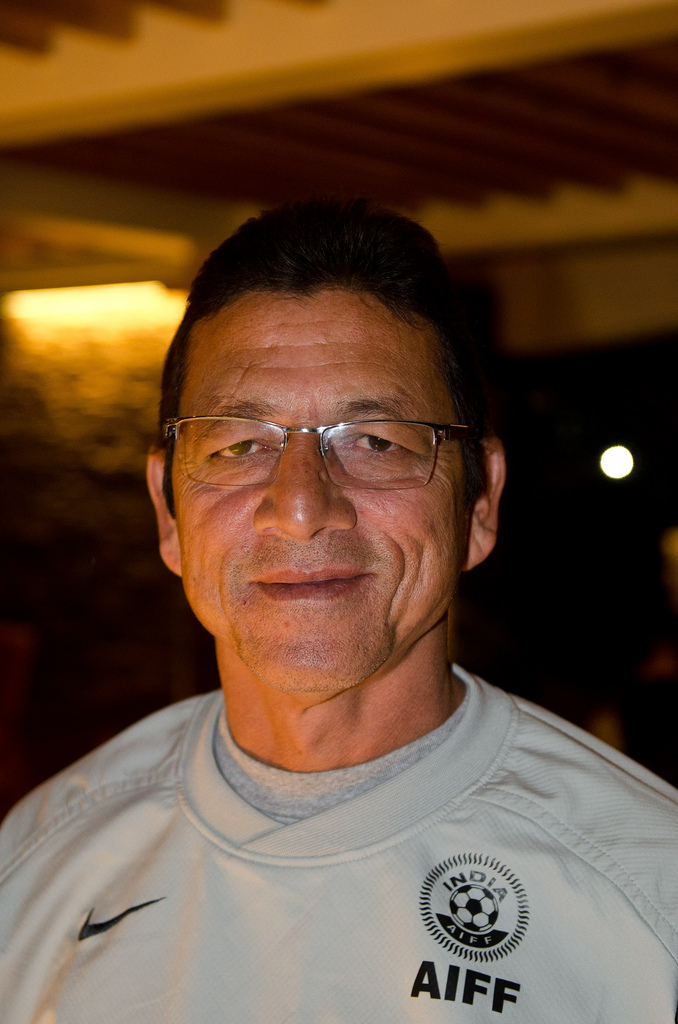
Sanjoy Sen managed the club from 2010 to 2012 and helped the team reaching finals of 2011 Durand Cup and 2012 IFA Shield

In 2013, the club won their maiden IFA Shield title by defeating East Bengal FC in the final by 1–0 margin. In that competition (Semi-finals), they also defeated a foreign side Deportivo Saprissa of Costa Rica. After the end of 2013–14 I-League season, United finished on tenth position with 26 points in 24 matches and was evicted from I-League for not fulfilling the Asian Football Confederation's club licensing criteria.

On 24 July 2015, it was announced that the club appointed Bino George as the new head coach. United emerged as champions in the 2019–20 Calcutta Premier Division B with 28 points in 14 matches and earned promotion to Division A. In that season, United reached to the semi-finals of the 2020 IFA Shield but lost to George Telegraph SC by 2–1.

=== 2021–present ===
United SC maintained good form in domestic league, as they moved to championship round of 2022–23 I-League 2. At the end of the round in May, they finished in fifth position. In June 2023, the Indian Football Association (IFA) announced the merger of both Premier Division A and B of the Calcutta Football League, ahead of its 125th edition, in which United was allowed to compete in Group I. In 2023–24 I-League 2, the club was managed by Ranjan Bhattacharjee. In that league season, United SC earned sixth-place finish with 15 points in 14 matches. In 2024–25 season, the club stayed and took part in the I-League 2.

== Crest & colours ==
The club crest is designed in the shape of a blue and white circle, that includes words United Sports Club in the blue strip. This is to show United Sports Club as the main name of the club. Inside the crest, there is a Peafowl on top of a football.

While the crest is blue and white, the official colours of United SC are purple and yellow. While still sponsored and owned by Chirag Computers, United Sports Club's official colours were purple and white. The home kit for United SC includes a purple and yellow jersey with purple shorts and white socks while the away kit is all white with red socks.

== Ownership ==
Originally established in 1927 as the EverReady Association, the club was renamed as the United Sports Club in 2006, following financial backing by Chirag Computers, a subsidiary of RP Group Company. With the inflow of sponsorship thereafter, the club clinched promotion to the first division of the I-League in 2008.

In 2011, Prayag Group (also known as Chirag United Sports Pvt. Ltd.) bought the majority stake of the club, and rebranded it as "Prayag United". Alokesh Kundu and Siddhartha Bhattacharya became General Secretary and Director of United Sports respectively. The club in headquartered in 33/8, Nabi Krishna Ghoshal Road.

== Kit manufacturers and shirt sponsors ==
Period	Kit manufacturer	Shirt sponsor
2007–2011		Chirag Computers
2011–2013		Prayag Group
2013–2014		
2015–2018	Vamos	Krishi Bharati

== Stadium ==
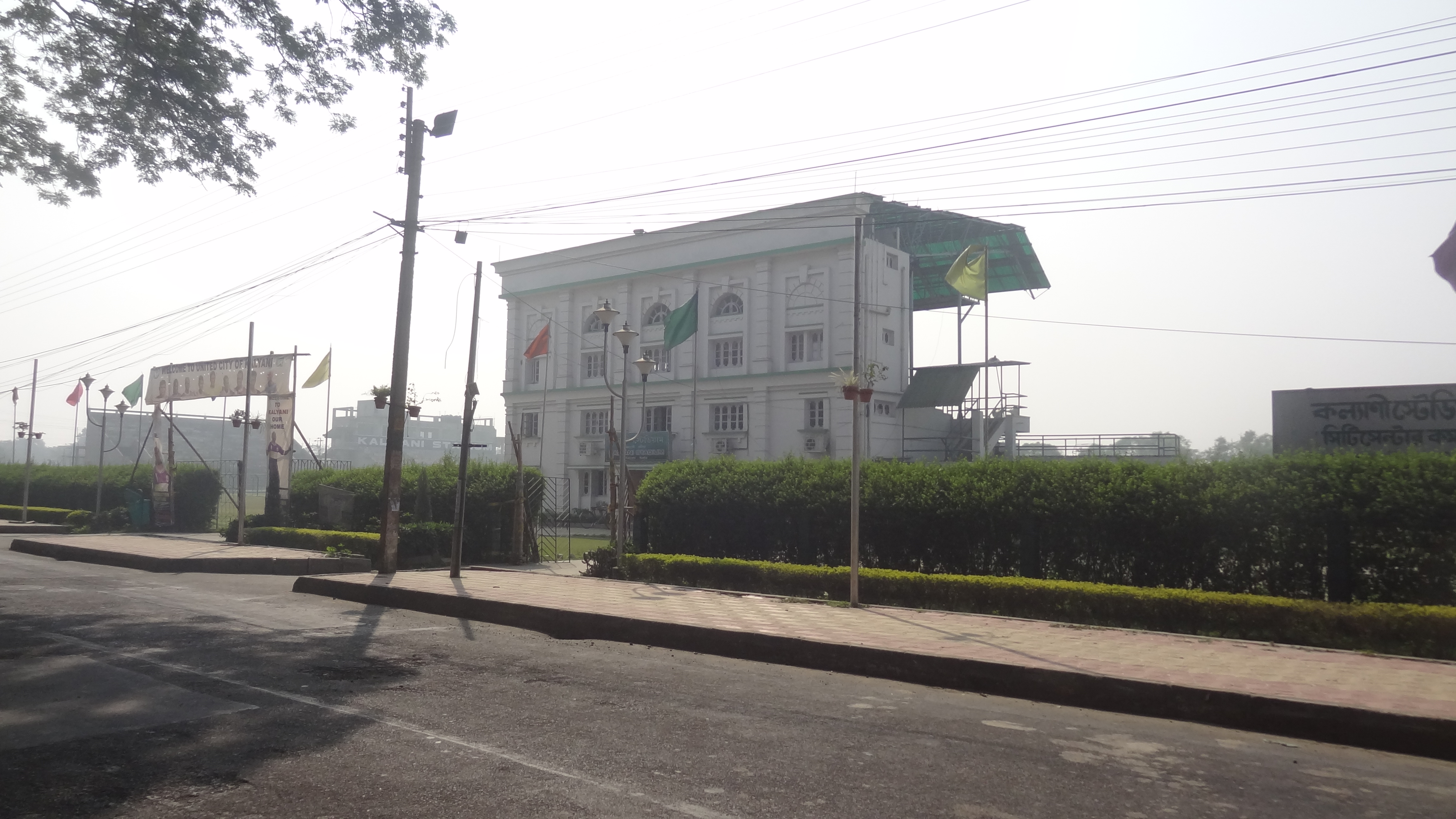
An outside view of the Kalyani Municipal Corporation Stadium

United Sports Club currently plays at the 20,000 seating Kalyani Municipal Corporation Stadium in Kalyani. Though the officials initially said that club would move to Siliguri, they have decided to stay in Kalyani for the 2013–14 season and continued there.

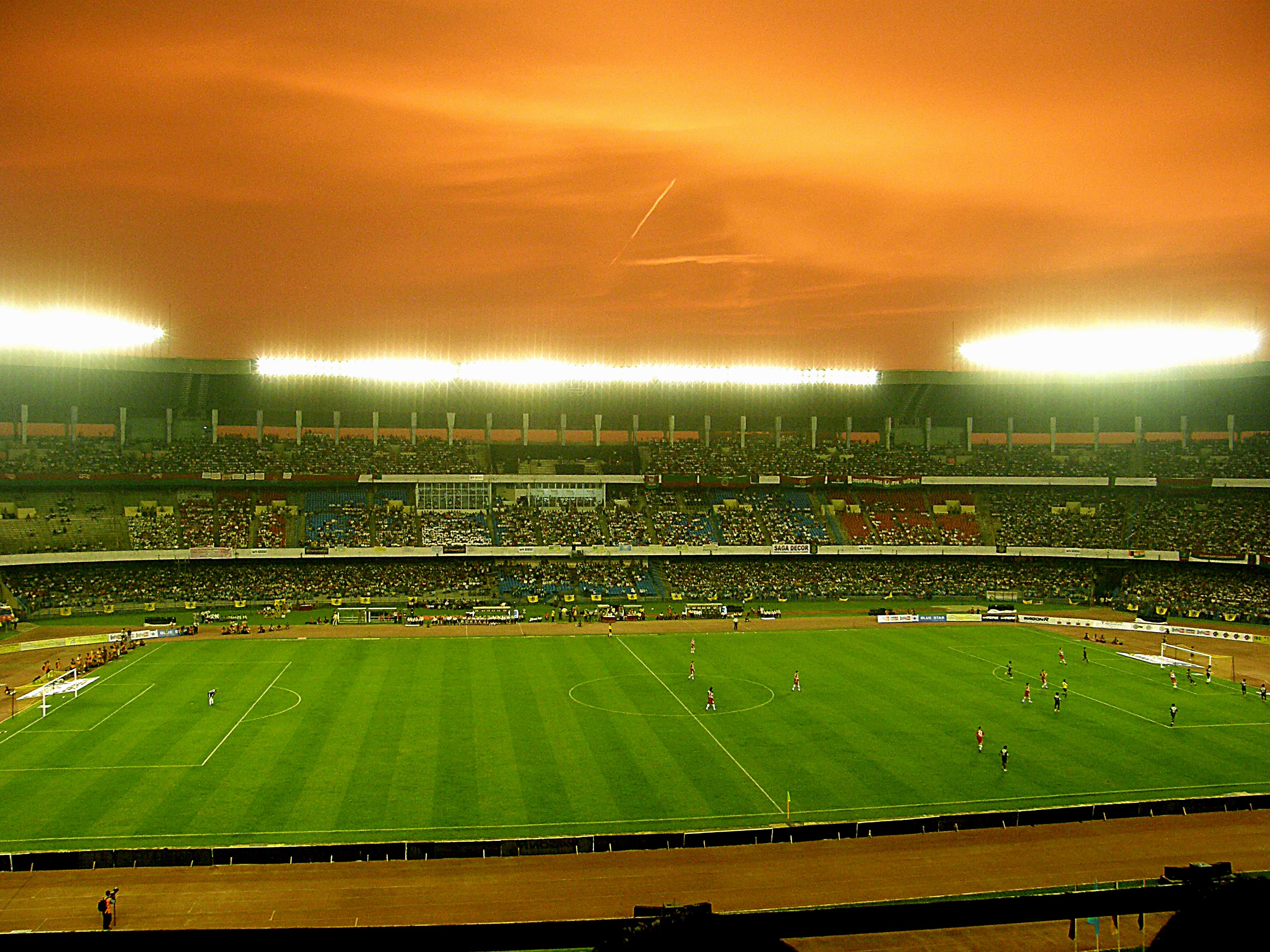
The Salt Lake Stadium

Previously, the club used the iconic Salt Lake Stadium for their home matches of the I-League and the Calcutta Football League.

== Players ==
=== First-team squad ===
As of August 2024

Note: Flags indicate national team as defined under FIFA eligibility rules; some limited exceptions apply. Players may hold more than one non-FIFA nationality.

No.	Pos.	Nation	Player
1	GK	IND	Raunak Ghosh
2	DF	IND	Ankan Bhattacherjee
3	DF	IND	Sourendra Nath Biswas
5	DF	IND	Pravat Soren
6	MF	IND	Aditya Thapa
7	MF	IND	Prasanta Das
8	MF	IND	Tarak Hembram
9	FW	IND	Sahil Harijan
10	FW	IND	Sujal Munda
12	MF	IND	Sayan Sarkar
14	MF	IND	Bijay Bahadur Gurung
15	MF	IND	Sudipta Malakar
16	DF	IND	Dipankar Tudu

No.	Pos.	Nation	Player
17	FW	IND	Suman Sarkar
18	DF	IND	Sumit Goswami
19	DF	IND	Rahul Kuddus Purkaite
20	MF	IND	B lalramthlengliana
23	MF	IND	Ranjit Das
24	MF	IND	Dipesh Murmu
27	MF	IND	Ajay Murmu
29	MF	IND	Amit Basak
31	GK	IND	Sourav Samanta
34	FW	IND	Gopal Pal
36	DF	IND	Rohmingthanga
42	GK	IND	Surojit Roy

== Notable players ==
FIFA World Cup player

- (Costa Rica) Carlos Hernández (2012–2013)

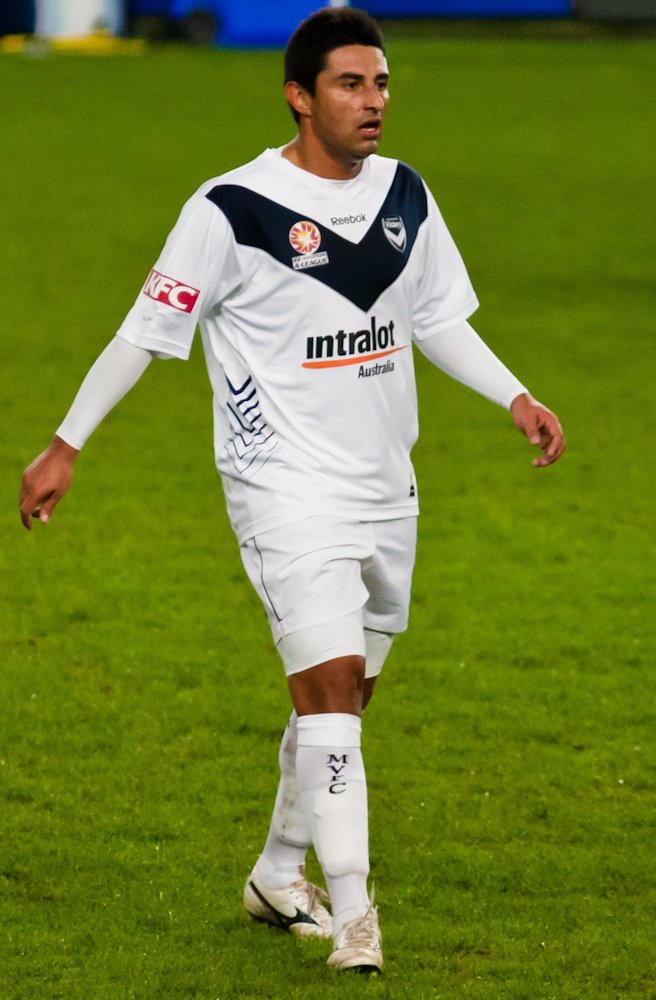
Costa Rican footballer Carlos Hernández, appeared in the 2006 FIFA World Cup, also played for the club from 2012 to 2013.

Foreign players

- (Australia) Keegan Nash (2009)
- (Brazil) Eduardo Du (2009–2010)
- (Ghana) Yusif Yakubu (2011–2012)
- (Liberia) Eric Brown (2013–2015)
- (New Zealand) Kayne Vincent (2011–2013)
- (Liberia) Eugene Gray (2003–2006)
- (Brazil) Edmilson Marques Pardal (2009–2010)
- (Nigeria) Ranti Martins (2012–2014)
- (Nigeria) Bello Razaq (2012–2014)
- (Nigeria) Junior Obagbemiro (2010–2011)
- (Ghana) Isaac Boakye (2013)
- (Zimbabwe) Ian Nekati (2022)

Noted Indian internationals

- Sunil Chhetri (2011) – all-time top goalscorer and most-capped player of the India national team.
- (India) Deepak Mondal (2011–2014) – recipient of both the Arjuna Award and AIFF Player of the Year.
- Subrata Paul (2012–2013) – former India captain, recipient of Arjuna Award.

== Honours ==
=== League ===
- I-League 2nd Division
  - Third place (1): 2008 (as Chirag United)
- Calcutta Football League
  - Runners-up (2): 2009, 2025
  - Third place (1): 2007
- Calcutta Premier Division B
  - Champions (1): 2019–20

=== Cup ===
- Durand Cup
  - Champions (1): 2010 (as Chirag United)
  - Runners-up (1): 2011 (as Prayag United)
- IFA Shield (Note: Fourth oldest football tournament, organized by the IFA (W.B.), and played between the local clubs of West Bengal and other invited ones.)
  - Champions (2): 2013, 2015 (as U-19 team)
  - Runners-up (2): 2005 (as Eveready Association), 2012
  - Third place (1): 2014
- All Airlines Gold Cup
  - Champions (1): 2003 (as Eveready Association)
- Sikkim Governor's Gold Cup
  - Champions (1): 2004 (as Eveready Association)
- Kalinga Cup
  - Champions (1): 2005
- Trades Cup
  - Champions (1): 2007
  - Runners-up (1): 2006
- EK Nayanar Memorial Gold Cup
  - Champions (2): 2005, 2011
- Amta Sanhati Gold Cup
  - Champions (1): 2015
- Kalna Independence Cup
  - Champions (1): 2016
- Naihati Gold Cup
  - Runners-up (1): 2022
- Madhyamgram MLA Cup
  - Runners-up (1): 2022–23

== Team records ==
=== Notable wins against foreign teams ===
Competition	Round	Year	Opposition	Score	Venue	City	Ref
Kalinga Cup	Group stage	2005	(Bangladesh) Badda Jagoroni Sangsad	4–2	Barabati Stadium	Cuttack	
Sikkim Governor's Gold Cup	Final	2005	(Nepal) ANFA XI	1–1 (4–2 p)	Paljor Stadium	Gangtok	
IFA Shield	Semi-finals	2013	(Costa Rica) Deportivo Saprissa	2–1	Kalyani Stadium	Kalyani	
IFA Shield	Group stage	2014	(South Korea) Busan Sun Moon	2–1	Salt Lake Stadium	Kolkata	
IFA Shield	Group stage	2014	(Singapore) Geylang International	2–1	Salt Lake Stadium	Kolkata	

=== Seasonal records ===
1st or W	Winners
2nd or RU	Runners-up
↑	Promoted
↓	Relegated
♦	Top scorer in division

Results of league and cup competitions by season
Season	Division	P	W	D	L	F	A	Pts	Pos	Federation Cup	Super Cup	Asia	Round reached	Name	Goals
Season	League									Federation Cup	Super Cup	Asia	Round reached	Top goalscorer	
2007	NFL2	5	2	1	2	6	5	7	3rd	—	—	—	—	—	—
2008	IL2	5	4	1	0	9	4	13	1st	—	—	—	—	—	—
2008–09	IL	22	6	8	8	20	26	26	8th	Group	—	—	—	—	—
2009–10	IL	26	8	8	10	33	39	32	8th	Group	—	—	—	(Brazil) Edmilson	9
2010–11	IL	26	5	14	7	31	36	29	8th	Group	—	—	—	(India) Sunil Chhetri	7
2011–12	IL	26	11	9	6	41	29	42	7th	Group	—	—	—	(Ghana) Yusif Yakubu	12
2012–13	IL	26	13	5	8	55	35	44	4th	Group	—	—	—	(Nigeria) Ranti Martins	26
2013–14	IL	24	5	11	8	22	32	26	10th	Group	—	—	—	(Liberia) Eric Brown	10
2015	IL2	14	5	2	7	24	28	17	5th	Group	—	—	—	—	—
2022–23	IL2	10	5	2	3	16	14	17	5th	—	—	—	—	—	—
2023–24	IL2	14	4	3	7	18	21	15	6th	—	—	—		(India) Sahil Harijan	11th

=== Other records ===
- United SC's biggest margin win in domestic football: 10–1 vs United Sikkim (10 November 2012; I-League)
- Highest goalscorer in a single edition of I-League, while representing United SC (then known as Prayag United): (Nigeria) Ranti Martins (with 26 goals in 2013–14 season), also won "Best Player of the I-League" award by the All India Football Federation as well as the "Best Forward" award.
- Highest goalscorer in a single edition of I-League 2, while representing United SC: (India) Sahil Harijan (with 11 goals in 2023–24 season).

== Managerial records ==
- List of United SC head coaches/managers

== Other departments ==
=== Football: youth section and academy ===
In 2013, United SC launched its U20 team to participate in the Elite League (India) as Prayag United U20 and competed in 2012 and 2013 I-League U20. The club's U19 team was formed in 2010 and competed in the 2010 and 2012 editions of U19 I-League. They later participated in the league during the 2014–15 I-League U19 season from group A – Kolkata zone and moved to final round. They have also participated in 2017–18 edition of youth league. Club's under-19 team also took part in IFA U19 Calcutta Football League.

United SC's reserve team also participated in regional tournaments like All India Steel Express Football Championship. The club has been operating United Sports Football School for youth development, having two campuses in Shyamnagar, and Doon Heritage School in Siliguri. In December 2023, football academy of United SC gained 'elite category' accreditation by the All India Football Federation.

Honours

- IFA Shield (Note: From 2015 to 2018, the IFA Shield was designed as a youth tournament wherein youth teams of all divisions were allowed to participate.)
  - Winners (1): 2015
- IFA U19 Calcutta Football League
  - Runners-up (1): 2011
- Krishanu Dey U19 Championship
  - Runners-up (1): 2004
- Dream Sports Championship (Kolkata Leg)
  - Runners-up (1): 2024

=== Men's cricket ===
United SC operates men's cricket team which is affiliated to the Cricket Association of Bengal (CAB).

Honours

- CC&FC Merchant's Cup
  - Champions (1): 2021–22

== See also ==
- Football in Kolkata
- List of football clubs in Kolkata
- List of football clubs in India
