= Du (footballer) =

Brazilian footballer (born 1978)

Personal information
- Full name: Eduardo Chacon Coelho Lacerda
- Date of birth: 28 June 1978 (age 48)
- Place of birth: Brazil
- Height: 1.87 m (6 ft 1 1/2 in)
- Position: Defender

Team information
- Current team: Southern Samity

Senior career*
Years	Team	Apps	(Gls)
2009–2010	Chirag United		
2010	Air India		
2011	Southern Samity		
- * Club domestic league appearances and goals

Eduardo Chacon Coelho Lacerda simply known as Du (born 28 June 1978) is a Brazilian former footballer who played as a defender. He spent majority of his playing career in India.
