= Army Green football team =

Indian Army's association football club

Army Green
- Full name: Army Green football team
- Short name: AGFT
- Owner(s): Army Sports Control Board; Indian Army
- League: Various
Home colours	Away colours

Army Green is one of the football sections that represents the Indian Army. The team regularly participates in the Durand Cup and various regional tournaments. The team's major achievement was in 2016 Durand Cup as they won the title by beating NEROCA FC in the final.

== Honours ==
=== Domestic ===
- Durand Cup
  - Champions (1): 2016
- Sukhia Gold Cup
  - Champions (1): 2019

== See also ==
- Army Red
- Indian Air Force
- Indian Navy
- Services football team
- Railways football team
- Assam Rifles
- Central Reserve Police Force SC
- CISF Protectors football team
- Indian Army Service Corps
