= Arun Ghosh =

Indian footballer

Arun Ghosh অরুণ ঘোষ
Personal information
- Date of birth: 7 June 1941 (age 85)
- Place of birth: Calcutta, Bengal Presidency, British India (now Kolkata, West Bengal, India)
- Position: Defender

Senior career*
Years	Team	Apps	(Gls)
1958–1959	Howrah Union		
1959–1960	Mohun Bagan		
1960–1963	East Bengal		
1963–?	Bengal Nagpur Railway FC		

International career
- India

Managerial career
- 1978: India
- 1978–1980: East Bengal
- 1980: Mohun Bagan
- 1984: India
- 1985: India
Medal record
Men's football
Representing India
Asian Games
Gold medal – first place	1962 Jakarta	Team
AFC Asian Cup
Runner-up	1964 Israel	Team
- * Club domestic league appearances and goals

Arun Ghosh (born 7 June 1941) is a former Indian football player who represented India internationally. He also played club football for both the Kolkata giants Mohun Bagan and East Bengal Club. He later managed the India national team.

== Playing career ==
Ghosh studied in Deenabandhu High School and Charuchandra College in Calcutta. He represented Calcutta University from 1957 to 1960 and was part of the All India Universities team that toured Kabul in 1958. In professional football, he played for Howrah Union, Mohun Bagan, East Bengal and Bengal and Nagpur Railway.

He was part of the team that played in the 1960 Rome Olympics under coaching of Syed Abdul Rahim. He later appeared in 1964 Merdeka Cup, where they achieved second place. In the same year, he went on to represent his nation at the 1964 AFC Asian Cup, where they also finished as runners-up as Israel clinched the title. He was also a member of the squad that won gold medal at the 1962 Asian Games Football Championship in 1962. He also played in the final, where India defeated South Korea 2–1.

When I was young, I used to play both badminton and football well. At that time, we did it, have proper grounds to play badminton so we used to organize matches with friends during evenings and football, I used to play at a local club. This was in 1954 or 1955. One day, one of my school friends named Tota had a trial in Howrah Union, then in the second division of Kolkata League. At that time I was very fit and strong and Dashu Mitra was impressed with my physique. He asked me if I played football. Hearing that I did, he asked me to come to practice the following day. Initially we were given the job of ball boys but Howrah Union eventually became my first club.

— Ghosh, on the beginning of his playing career.

Ghosh represented Bengal in Santosh Trophy, and played club football for then Calcutta Football League side East Bengal. He shifted to the "red and gold brigade" after playing for Mohun Bagan in the early 1960s.

At the 1960 Rome Olympics, Jim Lewis, a member of the England football team, is famously reported to have told Arun Ghosh, a defender in the Indian football team:

"You play like Bobby Moore!"

This compliment came before India's impressive performance in their match against France, which ended in a 1–1 draw. India had shown exceptional skill, ball control, and tactical discipline, which surprised many European players and commentators. Jim Lewis's remark highlighted how aesthetically pleasing and technically sound India's football was during that match — reminiscent of the flair associated with Bobby Moore.

It was always regretted for Arun ji, and it is repeatedly said by him to us that had Rahim Saheb lived for a few more years, an Olympic medal could have been won by India, which was missed at the Melbourne Games in 1956.

== Mohun Bagan to East Bengal Transfer Story ==
Arun Ghosh had already made a name for himself with performances in the Durand Cup and Rovers Cup. Coming from a Mohun Bagan-supporting family, Arun had been associated with the green-and-maroon brigade.

So, when rumors surfaced in 1960 that East Bengal had eyes on Arun, it created ripples across the city. No one in Mohun Bagan expected that their loyal side back would cross the Rubicon and wear the red and gold jersey of their fiercest rivals.

Interestingly, East Bengal's original transfer target was not Arun Ghosh but another talented defender T.A. Rahman. Impressed by his consistent performances, East Bengal had opened discussions with Rahman. However, at the last moment, Mohun Bagan managed to mend their financial differences with him and convinced Rahman to stay.

Stung by this loss, East Bengal's management decided to retaliate. Their new target? Arun Ghosh. By this time, Arun had grown into a top-tier defender, and the thought of poaching him from Mohun Bagan was too tempting to resist.

What followed was a carefully planned operation. East Bengal officials, aware of Arun's emotional discontent with Mohun Bagan, approached him discreetly. A key event had soured his relationship with the club: in one match, it's said that Mohun Bagan captain Sushil Guha snatched Arun's jersey, signaling a loss of trust. Though Mohun Bagan wanted him to play that match, this humiliating act pushed Arun towards the exit door.

At the time, Arun's father was seriously ill, and the family was residing in Shibpur, Howrah. One day, while Arun was out fetching medicine for his father, East Bengal officials intercepted him near a pharmacy. They were aided by Arun's sister, who played a critical role in facilitating the meeting. The discussion was emotional but calculated. Arun eventually agreed to sign—but laid down one firm condition: if East Bengal signed Rahman, he would not join.

Luckily for East Bengal, they already knew Rahman was no longer an option.

The East Bengal management now needed to ensure the signing was completed without alerting Mohun Bagan. They took Arun Ghosh to Basusree Cinema Hall, a movie theatre in South Kolkata, and kept him hidden overnight. The plan was to sign him as soon as the IFA (Indian Football Association) office opened at 10 a.m. the next morning.

The plan worked—almost. Arun signed for East Bengal at the IFA headquarters, and the news broke like wildfire. When Mohun Bagan officials learned what had happened, they were furious.

Word quickly spread that Arun Ghosh had been kept at Basusree Cinema Hall. In a scene more fitting of a movie than real life, dozens of Mohun Bagan officials and supporters gathered outside the theatre in protest. Among them was the legendary Shyamal Manna, a cultural icon and devoted Mohun Bagan supporter. Even Arun's elder brother showed up, pleading from outside, shouting:

“Arun, come out! Father is unwell!”

The situation was growing tense by the minute.

Realizing the danger, East Bengal official Sujan Bandopadhyay decided to act quickly. In a covert move, they sneaked a sleeping Arun Ghosh out of a backdoor of the cinema hall and rushed him in a car to Naktala, in South Kolkata. There, another East Bengal player, Subhashish Guha, gave him shelter at his home.

Now comes the legal twist. At the time, the football transfer rules in India allowed a player 10 days to reverse or change a club signing. East Bengal feared that Mohun Bagan would use this clause to snatch Arun back.

So, the Red and Gold officials made a bold decision: remove Arun Ghosh from Kolkata altogether.

They planned to fly him to North Bengal the next morning. However, as Sujan and his team approached the Dum Dum Airport, they saw several Mohun Bagan officials waiting outside. Realizing the danger, Sujan changed course on the fly. Instead of entering the airport, he sped away in the opposite direction, with Mohun Bagan's officials in hot pursuit.

The chase continued past Madhyamgram and Barasat, and it wasn't until they reached the outskirts of Jagulia that Mohun Bagan's men finally gave up. Arun Ghosh was now safely out of their reach.

Arun Ghosh's transfer to East Bengal didn't just strengthen the club's defense—it sent shockwaves through Kolkata's football ecosystem. The emotional betrayal felt by Mohun Bagan, the calculated aggression shown by East Bengal, and the sheer drama of the escape from Basusree—all of it became the stuff of footballing folklore.

For Arun, the move marked a new chapter. He would go on to become a key figure for East Bengal and later coach the club.

== Managerial career ==
In 1974, Ghosh went on to became coach of the India U-20 team along with Syed Abdul Salam, ahead of the 1974 AFC Youth Championship in Thailand. After a brief training camp in Patiala, his team participated in the tournament and reached the final. A 2–2 scoreline against Iran-20 insured that both the teams shared the trophy. Under his coaching, India U-20 team achieved their first ever continental title, in which Shabbir Ali scored five goals.

Ghosh also served as director of Tata Football Academy in Jamshedpur from 1997 to 2003.

== Personal life ==
Ghosh is currently living with his family in Howrah, West Bengal. His son is a national table tennis champion and his grandson is an engineer and state table tennis player. He regarded his best friend and teammate Tulsidas Balaram as the best Indian football player. Ghosh referred to him as "Balaram kaku" because they had a 5-year age gap between them. Ghosh was also friends with Pradyut Barman who played in the 1962 Asian Games, and Sheoo Mewalal who played twice representing India in the Olympics. Upon Mewalal's death, Ghosh reportedly went to a newspaper office and told them to write about Mewalal.

He has been diagnosed with Alzheimer's and Dementia.

He is a fan of Chelsea F.C. and his favorite player is Didier Drogba. He has coached footballers like Mahesh Gawli, Kalyan Chaubey, Noel Wilson, Clifford Miranda, and Subrata Paul.

He has received awards from clubs like Mohun Bagan and East Bengal, as well as from the MP of Howrah, his student Prasun Banerjee. He has received letters from Mamata Banerjee.

He recovered from a bout of pneumonia in 2024. He was present for the screening of the 2024 film Maidaan at Avani Riverside Mall, along with producer Boney Kapoor, director Amit Sharma, and 1962 Asian Games winner DMK Afzal were also there in the screening.

== Honours ==
=== Player ===
India

- Asian Games Gold medal: 1962
- AFC Asian Cup runners-up: 1964
- Santosh Trophy winner: 1959-60 Santosh Trophy
- Santosh Trophy winner: 1962-63 Santosh Trophy
- Merdeka Tournament third-place: 1965, 1966

=== Manager ===
India U20

- AFC Asian U-19 Championship: 1974

East Bengal

- Federation Cup: 1978–79

Mohun Bagan

- Federation Cup: 1980–81

=== Individual ===
- Arjuna Award: 1965
- East Bengal "Bharat Gaurav Award": 2013

== See also ==
- History of Indian football
- History of the India national football team
- India national football team at the Olympics
- List of India national football team captains
- List of India national football team managers
