= Army Red football team =

Indian Army's association football club

Army Red
- Full name: Army Red football team
- Short name: ARFT
- Owner(s): Army Sports Control Board; Indian Army
- Head coach: Anthony Ramesh
- League: Calcutta Football League
Home colours	Away colours

Army Red, also known as Indian Army football team, is one of the football sections that represents the Indian Army. The team regularly participates in the Durand Cup, Calcutta Football League and various regional tournaments.

== History ==
Army Red briefly participated in the top division of the Calcutta Football League in 2016. In June 2023, the club was placed in the group I, when the Indian Football Association (IFA) announced the merger of both Premier Division A and B of the Calcutta Football League ahead of its 125th edition.

== Honours ==
=== League ===
- CFL First Division
  - Champions (1): 2022

=== Cup ===
- Durand Cup
  - Champions (1): 2005
  - Runners-up (1): 2002–03
- IFA Shield
  - Runners-up (1): 1991
- Sikkim Gold Cup
  - Champions (1): 1999
  - Runners-up (5): 1994, 1998, 2006, 2008, 2018
- Darjeeling Gold Cup
  - Champions (1): 2010
- Kalinga Cup
  - Champions (2): 2010, 2016
  - Runners-up (1): 2009
- Mohan Kumar Mangalam Football Tournament
  - Champions (1): 2006

=== International ===
- (Nepal) Tribhuvan Challenge Shield
  - Winners (2): 1955, 1956 (as Indian Army Club)

== See also ==
- Army Green
- Indian Air Force
- Indian Navy
- Services football team
- Railways football team
- Assam Rifles
- Central Reserve Police Force SC
- CISF Protectors football team
- Indian Army Service Corps
