= 2025 Sikkim Gold Cup =

All India Governor's Gold Cup

Tournament details
- Country: India
- Venue: Gangtok
- Dates: 16 – 29 November
- Teams: 16

Final positions
- Champions: Rajasthan United (1st title)
- Runners-up: Services

Tournament statistics
- Matches played: 15
- Goals scored: 45 (3 per match)

The 2025 Sikkim Gold Cup (also known as 2025 All India Governor's Gold Cup) is the 41st edition of the Sikkim Gold Cup, hosted by the Sikkim Football Association.

The tournament featured sixteen teams, including Indian Super League and I-League academies, I-League 2, State leagues and international invitees from Tibet and Nepal.

== Broadcasting ==
Broadcaster(s)	Ref.
SSEN	

== Teams ==
Pre-Qualifying	Pre-Quarter	Quarterfinals
1. (India) Sikkim Brotherhood; 2. (India) Sikkim Himalayan; 3. (Tibet) Tibetan NFA; 4. (India) Sikkim Dragons; 5. (India) GTA XI; 6. (India) Sikkim Police FT; 7. (India) Services FT; 8. (India) Sikkim Aakraman	9. (India) Rajasthan United; 10. (India) NEROCA; 11. (India) Diamond Harbour; 12. (India) Sudeva Delhi	13. (Nepal) Church Boys United; 14. (India) Northeast United (R); 15. (India) Inter Kashi; 16. (India) East Bengal (R)

== Venue ==
Gangtok	2025 Sikkim Gold Cup is located in Sikkim
Paljor Stadium	2025 Sikkim Gold Cup is located in Sikkim
Capacity: 30,000	2025 Sikkim Gold Cup is located in Sikkim
Aerial view Sree Kanteerava Stadium	2025 Sikkim Gold Cup is located in Sikkim

== Matches ==
=== Bracket ===
Pre-Qualifying
(India) Sikkim Brotherhood	1
(India) Sikkim Himalayan	3
(Tibet) Tibetan NFA	0
(India) Sikkim Dragons	4
(India) GTA XI	1
(India) Sikkim Police	3
(India) Services	3
(India) Sikkim Aakraman	0

Pre-Quarter
(India) Rajasthan United	3
(India) Sikkim Himalayan	0
(India) Sikkim Dragons	2
(India) NEROCA	0
(India) Diamond Harbour	3
(India) Sikkim Police	1
(India) Services	1
(India) Sudeva Delhi	0

Quarterfinals
(Nepal) Church Boys United	1
(India) Rajasthan United	3
(India) Sikkim Dragons	2
(India) NorthEast United (R)	1
(India) Inter Kashi	1
(India) Diamond Harbour	3
(India) Services	1
(India) East Bengal (R)	0

Semifinals
(India) Rajasthan United	3
(India) Sikkim Dragons	2
(India) Diamond Harbour	0
(India) Services	2

Final
(India) Rajasthan United	1
(India) Services	0

=== Pre-Qualifying ===
16 November 2025	Sikkim Brotherhood (India)	1–3	(India) Sikkim Himalayan	Gangtok
12:00 (IST)				Stadium: Paljor Stadium

16 November 2025	GTA XI (India)	1–3	(India) Sikkim Police	Gangtok
14:30 (IST)				Stadium: Paljor Stadium

17 November 2025	Tibetan NFA (Tibet)	0–4	(India) Sikkim Dragons	Gangtok
12:00 (IST)				Stadium: Paljor Stadium

17 November 2025	Services (India)	3–0	(India) Sikkim Aakraman	Gangtok
14:30 (IST)				Stadium: Paljor Stadium

=== Pre-Quarter ===
18 November 2025	Diamond Harbour (India)	3–1	(India) Sikkim Police	Gangtok
14:00 (IST)				Stadium: Paljor Stadium

19 November 2025	Sikkim Dragons (India)	2–0	(India) NEROCA	Gangtok
14:00 (IST)				Stadium: Paljor Stadium

20 November 2025	Services (India)	1–0	(India) Sudeva Delhi	Gangtok
14:00 (IST)				Stadium: Paljor Stadium

21 November 2025	Rajasthan United (India)	3–0	(India) Sikkim Himalayan	Gangtok
14:00 (IST)				Stadium: Paljor Stadium

=== Quarter-finals ===
22 November 2025	Inter Kashi (India)	1–3	(India) Diamond Harbour	Gangtok
14:00 (IST)				Stadium: Paljor Stadium

23 November 2025	Church Boys United (Nepal)	1–3	(India) Rajasthan United	Gangtok
16:30 (IST)				Stadium: Paljor Stadium

24 November 2025	Sikkim Dragons (India)	2–1	(India) NorthEast United (R)	Gangtok
14:00 (IST)				Stadium: Paljor Stadium

25 November 2025	Services (India)	1–0	(India) East Bengal (R)	Gangtok
16:30 (IST)				Stadium: Paljor Stadium

=== Semi-finals ===
26 November 2025	Rajasthan United (India)	3–2	(India) Sikkim Dragons	Gangtok
16:30 (IST)				Stadium: Paljor Stadium

27 November 2025	Diamond Harbour (India)	0–2	(India) Services	Gangtok
16:30 (IST)				Stadium: Paljor Stadium

=== Final ===
29 November 2025	Rajasthan United (India)	1–0	(India) Services	Gangtok
13:30 (IST)	Joseph Lalvemhima	Report		Stadium: Paljor Stadium
