= 2019 Sikkim Premier Division League =

Sikkim Premier Division League
- Season: 2019
- Champions: League suspended
- Matches played: 20
- Goals scored: 65 (3.25 per match)

The 2019 Sikkim Premier Division League was the eighth season of the Sikkim Premier Division League, the top division football league in the Indian state of Sikkim. The league kicked off from 24 August with eight teams competing.

== Teams ==
- Boys Club
- Kumar Sporting FC
- Sikkim Aakraman FC
- Gangtok Himalayan SC
- Sikkim Police FC
- State Sports Academy
- Unicorn FC
- United Sikkim FC

== Venue ==
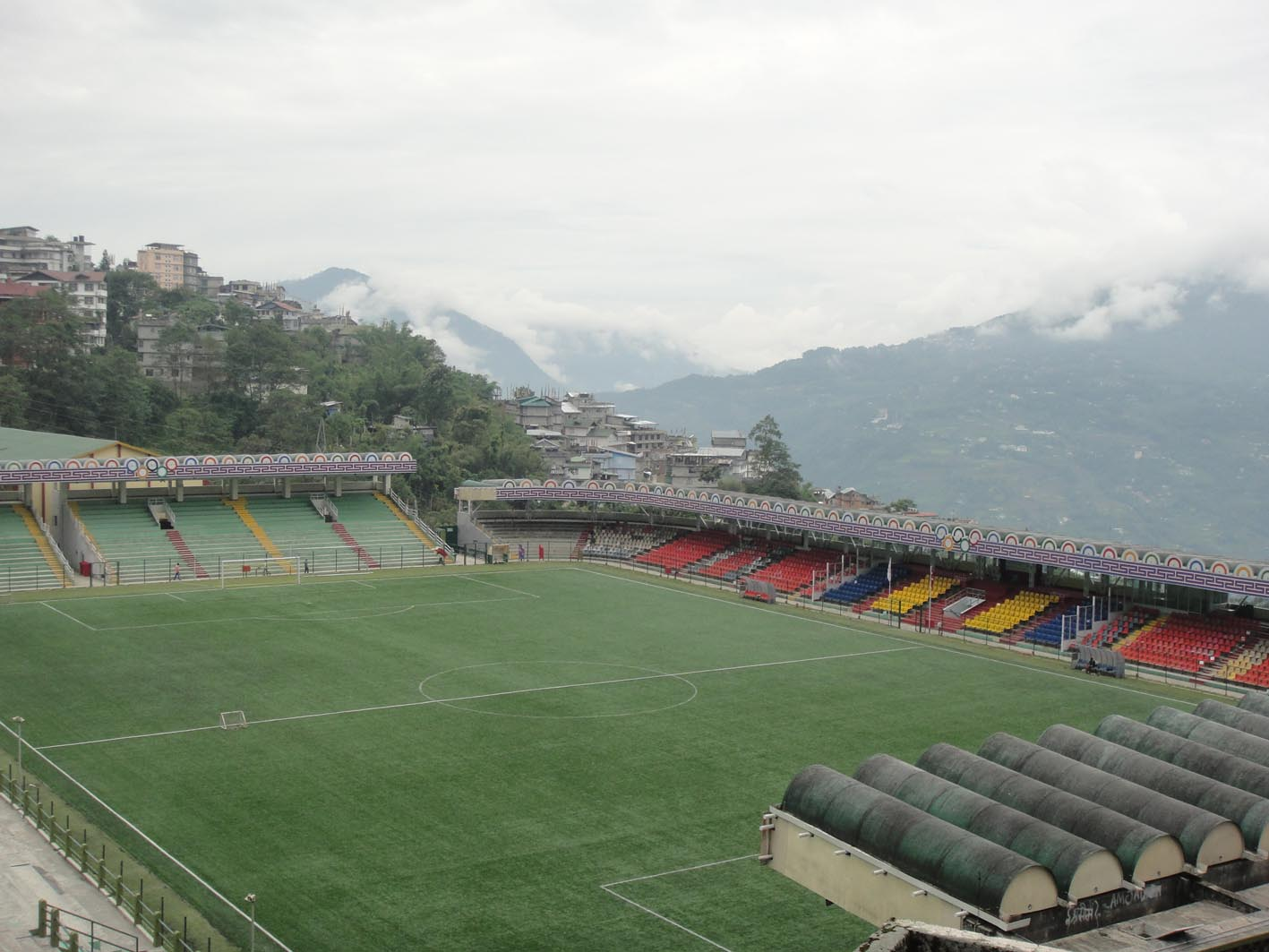
Paljor Stadium in Gangtok, Sikkim

== Standings ==
Pos	Team	Pld	W	D	L	GF	GA	GD	Pts	Qualification or relegation
1	Sikkim Police FC	7	4	2	1	11	3	+8	14	Champion
2	Sikkim Aakraman FC	5	4	1	0	16	1	+15	13	
3	Sikkim Himalayan SC	5	3	2	0	17	3	+14	11	
4	Kumar Sporting FC	7	3	1	3	8	11	−3	10	
5	State Sports Academy	5	2	1	2	11	2	+9	7	
6	Unicorn FC	6	1	1	4	4	27	−23	4	
7	United Sikkim FC	5	1	0	4	4	12	−8	3	Relegation to B Division
8	Boys Club	6	1	0	5	3	15	−12	3	Relegation to B Division

Source: SPDL
Rules for classification: 1) Points; 2) Goal difference; 3) Goals scored

== Note ==
Sikkim Football Association imposed a one-year ban for the Sikkim Aakraman FC. Three players and a coach were accused of assaulting referee after the match against Sikkim Police FC at Paljor Stadium, Gangtok on 10 September 2019. The league was suspended on 17 September 2019 following disputes between The Football Players Association of Sikkim (FCAS) and the Sikkim Football Association (SFA).
