= 2024 Sikkim Gold Cup =

All India Governor's Gold Cup

Tournament details
- Country: India
- Venue: Gangtok
- Dates: 8 – 24 November
- Teams: 16

Final positions
- Champions: (India) NorthEast United (1st title)

Tournament statistics
- Matches played: 12
- Goals scored: 47 (3.92 per match)

The 2024 Sikkim Gold Cup (also known as 2024 All India Governor's Gold Cup) was the 40th edition of the Sikkim Gold Cup, hosted by the Sikkim Football Association.

The tournament featured sixteen teams, including Indian Super League and I-League academies, I-League 2, State leagues and international invitees from Bhutan, Malaysia, Nepal and UAE.

The final was held between Gangtok Himalayan and NorthEast United, in which NorthEast United won through penalties. Honorary Chief guest of the match were Chief Minister Prem Singh Tamang and Governor Om Prakash Mathur.

There was also an exhibition match played on 23 November, with teams being Chief Minister XI and GTA XI. Chief Minister Prem Singh Tamang was having pre match sessions and giving youth a message to indulge in sports.

== Teams ==
Pre-Qualifying	Pre-Quarter	Quarterfinals
1. (India) Sikkim Police; 2. (India) Kalighat Milan Sangha; 3. (India) Army Red; 4. (India) Khawzawl Vengthar; 5. (India) GTA XI; 6. (India) Gangtok Himalayan; 7. (India) Punjab Police; 8. (India) Chennaiyin	9. (India) Gokulam Kerala; 10. (India) NorthEast United; 11. (India) Sudeva Delhi; 12. (India) Diamond Harbour	13. (Bhutan) Transport United; 14. (United Arab Emirates) Royal; 15. (Malaysia) Kelantan Darul Naim; 16. (Nepal) Church Boys United

== Venue ==
Gangtok	2024 Sikkim Gold Cup is located in Sikkim
Paljor Stadium	2024 Sikkim Gold Cup is located in Sikkim
Capacity: 30,000	2024 Sikkim Gold Cup is located in Sikkim
Aerial view Sree Kanteerava Stadium	2024 Sikkim Gold Cup is located in Sikkim

== Matches ==
All international teams have been given a direct quarterfinal berth.

=== Bracket ===
Pre-Qualifying
(India) Sikkim Police	5
(India) Kalighat Milan Sangha	0
(India) Army Red	1
(India) Khawzawl Vengthar	5
(India) GTA XI	1
(India) Gangtok Himalayan	3
(India) Punjab Police	1
(India) Chennaiyin	3

Pre-Quarter
(India) Sikkim Police	3
(India) Gokulam Kerala	4
(India) Khawzawl Vengthar	1
(India) NorthEast United	3
(India) Gangtok Himalayan(p)	1 (4)
(India) Sudeva Delhi	1 (3)
(India) Chennaiyin	1
(India) Diamond Harbour	0

Quarterfinals
(India) Gokulam Kerala	2
(Bhutan) Transport United	1
(India) NorthEast United	6
(United Arab Emirates) Royal	1
(India) Gangtok Himalayan	3
(Malaysia) Kelantan Darul Naim	0
(India) Chennaiyin	1
(Nepal) Church Boys United	0

Semifinals
(India) Gokulam Kerala	0
(India) NorthEast United	2
(India) Gangtok Himalayan	2
(India) Chennaiyin	1

Final
(India) NorthEast United (p)	0 (4)
(India) Gangtok Himalayan	0 (3)

=== Pre-Quarter ===
12 November 2024	Sikkim Police (India)	3–4	(India) Gokulam Kerala	Gangtok
14:00				Stadium: Paljor Stadium

13 November 2024	Gangtok Himalayan (India)	1–1 (4–3 p)	(India) Sudeva Delhi	Gangtok
14:00				Stadium: Paljor Stadium

14 November 2024	Khawzawl Vengthar (India)	1–3	(India) NorthEast United	Gangtok
14:00				Stadium: Paljor Stadium

15 November 2024	Chennaiyin (India)	1–0	(India) Diamond Harbour	Gangtok
14:00				Stadium: Paljor Stadium

=== Quarter-finals ===
16 November 2024	Gokulam Kerala (India)	2–1	(Bhutan) Transport United	Gangtok
14:00				Stadium: Paljor Stadium

17 November 2024	Gangtok Himalayan (India)	3–0	(Malaysia) Kelantan Darul Naim	Gangtok
14:00				Stadium: Paljor Stadium

18 November 2024	NorthEast United (India)	6–1	(United Arab Emirates) Royal	Gangtok
14:00				Stadium: Paljor Stadium

19 November 2024	Chennaiyin (India)	1–0	(Nepal) Church Boys United	Gangtok
17:30				Stadium: Paljor Stadium

=== Semi-finals ===
20 November 2024	Gokulam Kerala (India)	0–2	(India) NorthEast United	Gangtok
17:30				Stadium: Paljor Stadium

21 November 2024	Gangtok Himalayan (India)	2–1	(India) Chennaiyin	Gangtok
17:30				Stadium: Paljor Stadium

=== Final ===
24 November 2024	NorthEast United (India)	0–0 (4–3 p)	(India) Gangtok Himalayan	Gangtok
14:30				Stadium: Paljor Stadium
