= 2023 Sikkim Premier Division League =

Sikkim Premier Division League
- Season: 2023
- Dates: 21 June – 22 July
- Champions: Sikkim Police (1st title)
- Matches: 28
- Goals: 109 (3.89 per match)
- All statistics correct as of 23 July 2023.

The 2023 Sikkim Premier Division League was the ninth season of the Sikkim Premier Division League, the top division football league in the Indian state of Sikkim. The league kicked off from 21 June and ended on 22 July, with eight teams competing.

== Teams ==
Team	Location
Sikkim Aakraman	Gangtok
Sikkim Himalayan	Gangtok
Boys' Club Gangtok	Gangtok
Sikkim Police	Gangtok
United Sikkim	Gangtok
Sikkim Unicorn FC	Gangtok
SAI Namchi	Namchi
Kumar Sporting FC	Rongneck

== Venue ==
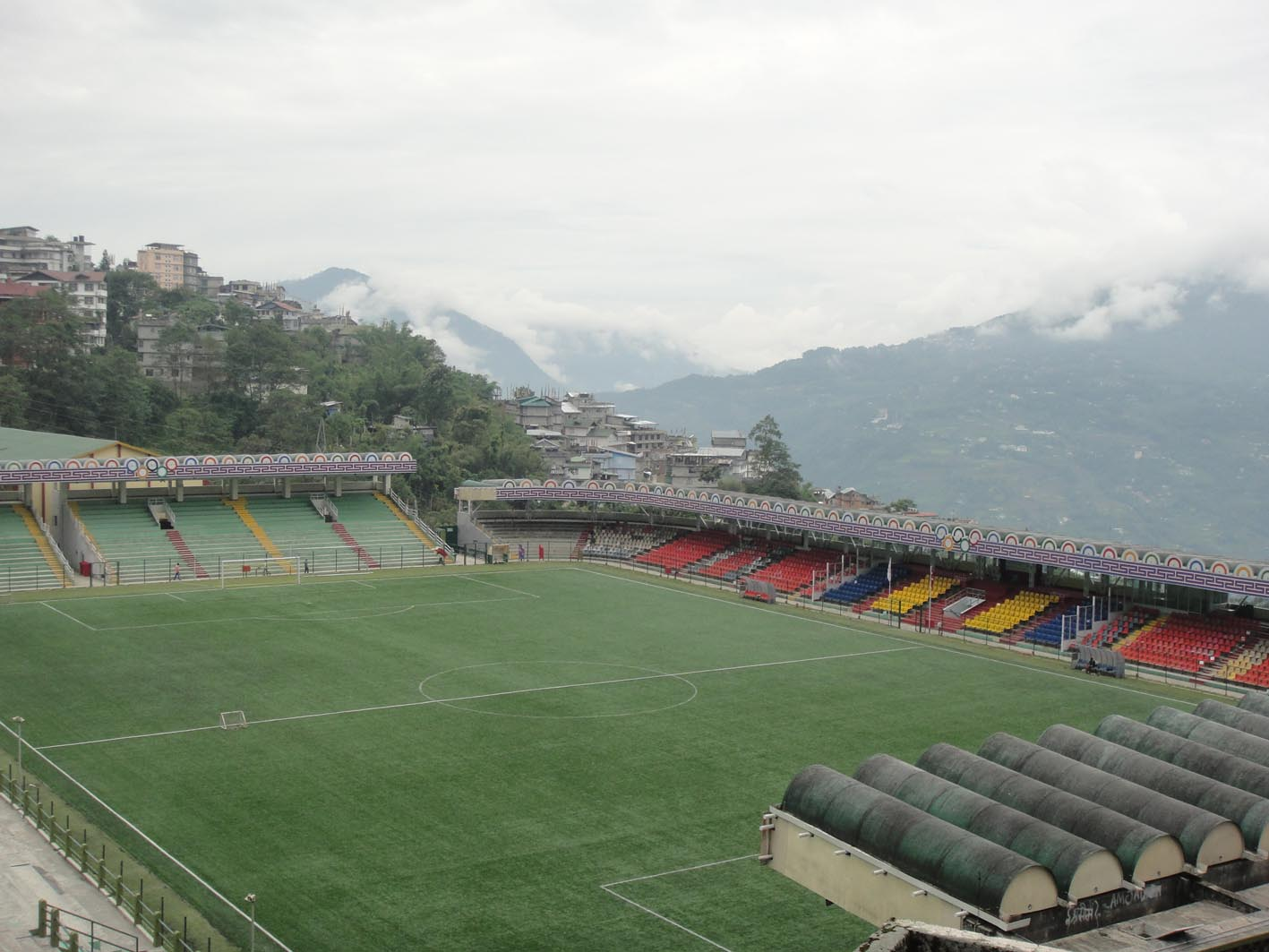
Paljor Stadium in Gangtok, Sikkim

== Standings ==
Pos	Team	Pld	W	D	L	GF	GA	GD	Pts	Qualification or relegation
1	Sikkim Police	7	6	1	0	15	5	+10	19	Champions, Possible qualification to the I-League 3
2	Sikkim Himalayan	7	5	2	0	21	4	+17	17	
3	United Sikkim	7	3	2	2	18	10	+8	11	
4	Sikkim Aakraman	7	4	1	2	14	7	+7	13	
5	Kumar Sporting FC	7	3	1	3	15	15	0	10	
6	SAI Namchi	7	1	2	4	10	13	−3	5	
7	Boys’ Club Gangtok	7	1	1	5	12	23	−11	4	Relegation to B Division
8	Sikkim Unicorn FC	7	0	0	7	4	32	−28	0	Relegation to B Division

Source: The Away End
Rules for classification: 1) Points; 2) Goal difference; 3) Goals scored
