= Palsang Lama =

Nepalese footballer

Personal information
- Full name: Palsang Lama
- Place of birth: Kathmandu, Nepal
- Height: 1.80 m (5 ft 11 in)
- Position: Defender

Team information
- Current team: Minerva Punjab
- Number: 23

Youth career
- Calcutta FC

Senior career*
Years	Team	Apps	(Gls)
2012–2013	United Sikkim		
2013–2014	Gangtok Himalayan		
2016	Tollygunge Agragami		
2017–2018	Minerva Punjab	1	(0)
- * Club domestic league appearances and goals as of 13 January 2017

Palsang Lama is a Nepalese professional footballer who plays as a defender. He most recently played for Dhangadhi FC in the Nepal Super League.

== Playing career ==
Born in Nepal, Lama started his football career from United Sikkim FC, Calcutta Football League for the side Tollygunge Agragami. On 13 January 2017 he made his professional debut in the Indian I-League with Minerva Punjab against Aizawl. He started and played 52 minutes as Minerva Punjab lost 1–0.

== Career statistics ==
Club	Season	League	Apps	Goals
Minerva Punjab	2016–17	I-League	1	0

== Honours ==
Sikkim Himalayan

- Sikkim Premier Division League: 2014

Minerva Punjab

- I-League: 2017–18 (squad member)
