= 2018 Sikkim Premier Division League =

Sikkim Premier Division League
- Season: 2018–19
- Champions: United Sikkim FC (3rd title)
- All statistics correct as of 6 September 2019.

The 2018 Sikkim Premier Division League was the seventh season of the Sikkim Premier Division League, the top division football league in the Indian state of Sikkim. The league kicked off from 21 July with eight teams competing.

== Teams ==
The teams participating in the 2018 league:

- United Sikkim FC
- State Sports Academy
- Boy's Club
- Pakyong United FC
- Sikkim Himalayan SC
- Sikkim Aakraman FC
- SAI Namchi
- Unicorn FC
