= 2026 Sikkim Gold Cup =

All India Governor's Gold Cup

Tournament details
- Country: India
- Venue: Gangtok
- Dates: 5–16 October
- Teams: 14

Final positions
- Champions: Shillong Lajong (1st title)
- Runners-up: Sikkim Aakraman

Tournament statistics
- Matches played: 13
- Goals scored: 47 (3.62 per match)

The 2026 Sikkim Gold Cup (also known as 2026 All India Governor's Gold Cup) is the 42nd edition of the Sikkim Gold Cup, hosted by the Sikkim Football Association.

The tournament featured sixteen teams, including Indian Super League and I-League academies, I-League 2 and State leagues.

== Broadcasting ==
Number 10 Sports

== Teams ==
Pre-Qualifying	Pre-Quarter	Quarterfinals
1. Black Eagle SC; 2. Garhwal Heroes; 3. GTA XI; 4. Sikkim Aakraman	5. Gokulam Kerala; 6. Thunderbolt North United; 7. Odisha XI; 8. Singling FC; 9. Oil India; 10. Banaras Baghpat	11. Sudeva Delhi; 12. Northeast United (R); 13. East Bengal (R); 14. Shillong Lajong

== Venue ==
Gangtok	2026 Sikkim Gold Cup is located in Sikkim
Paljor Stadium	2026 Sikkim Gold Cup is located in Sikkim
Capacity: 30,000	2026 Sikkim Gold Cup is located in Sikkim
Aerial view Sree Kanteerava Stadium	2026 Sikkim Gold Cup is located in Sikkim

== Matches ==
=== Bracket ===
Pre-Qualifying
Sikkim Aakraman	2
Garhwal Heroes	0
Black Eagle SC	3
GTA XI	1

Pre-Quarter
Gokulam Kerala	4
Thunderbolt North United	1
Sikkim Aakraman (p)	0 (5)
Odisha XI	0 (3)
Singling FC	4
Oil India	1
Black Eagle SC	5
Banaras Baghpat	0

Quarterfinals
Gokulam Kerala	2
Sudeva Delhi	1
Sikkim Aakraman	2
East Bengal	1
NorthEast United	2 (5)
Singling FC (p)	2 (6)
Shillong Lajong	3
Black Eagle SC	1

Semifinals
Gokulam Kerala	2
Sikkim Aakraman	3
Singling FC	0 (4)
Shillong Lajong (p)	0 (6)

Final
Sikkim Aakraman	2
Shillong Lajong	5
