= List of United Sikkim FC managers =

This is a list of United Sikkim Football Club's managers and their records from 2011, when the first professional manager was appointed, to the present day.

== Statistics ==
Name	Nationality	From	To	P	W	D	L	GF	GA	Win%	Honours	Ref
Stanley Rozario	India	March 2011	3 December 2011	14	6	6	2	25	17	42.86		
Philippe De Ridder	Belgium	3 December 2011	13 November 2012	26	11	6	9	45	48	42.31	2012 I-League 2nd Division runner-up	
Baichung Bhutia	India	13 November 2012	13 December 2012	0	0	0	0	0	0	—		
Nathan Hall	Australia	13 December 2012	October 2013	19	1	4	14	0	0	5.26		
Soibam Ekendra Singh	India	2013	2014									
Kamal Bagdas	India	2023	present									
