= Sikkim Women's Football League =

Indian regional women's association football league in the state of Sikkim

- Organising body: Sikkim Football Association (SFA)
- Founded: 2023; 3 years ago
- Country: India
- Number of clubs: 6
- Level on pyramid: 3
- Promotion to: Indian Women's League 2
- Current champions: Singling SC (1st title) (2026)
- Most championships: SSA Soreng; Singling SC (1 title)
- Broadcaster(s): SFA (YouTube)

The Sikkim Women's Football League, earlier known as Sikkim Women's Super League, is the top division of women's football league in the Indian state of Sikkim. The league is organised by the Sikkim Football Association (SFA), the official football governing body of the state.

The inaugural season was held in 2023 and was won by SSA Soreng.

== Format ==
The league features six teams, namely Young Girls FC, Pakyong United FC, Northerners Girls FC, Soreng Girls Academy, Dentam Girls Academy and Southerners Girls. The league offers women players the opportunity to excel and gain recognition. Teams are allowed a maximum of 25 players, including five players from outside the state. The league is designed for each team to play at least five matches. The winners of the Sikkim Women’s Super League will be nominated to participate in the IWL 2nd Division.

The 2026 edition also included teams from neighbouring North Bengal, making Sikkim one of the few states in India to feature outstation clubs in their domestic league.

== Venue ==
All inaugural season matches were held at Paljor Stadium.

== Teams ==
Teams participating in the 2026 season:

No.	Team	Location
1	Gangtok Himalayan	Gangtok
2	Singling SC	Soreng
3	Northerners FC	Chadey, Mangan district
4	Chujachen Sports Academy	Rongli, Pakyong district
5	Darjeeling XI	Darjeeling, West Bengal (outstation team)
6	Milan More Football Academy	Siliguri, West Bengal (outstation team)

== Champions ==
Season	Champion	Runners-up	Ref
2023	SSA Soreng	Southerners Girls Namchi	
2026	Singling SC	Gangtok Himalayan	

== See also ==
- SFA "A" Division S-League
- Sikkim Premier League
