= Bhaichung Stadium =

Association football stadium in the Indian state of Sikkim

Coordinates: 27°9′48.17″N 88°21′19.28″E

- Interactive map of Bhaichung Stadium
- Full name: Bhaichung Bhutia Football Stadium
- Location: Namchi, South Sikkim
- Owner: Government of Sikkim
- Capacity: 15,000
- Surface: Artificial turf
- Field size: 104 m × 65 m (114 yd × 71 yd)

Construction
- Opened: 2011
- Renovated: 1 November 2021

Tenants
- Sikkim Premier League; SFA A-Division S-League; Sikkim B Division (sometimes); Sikkim C Division (sometimes); Sikkim Governor's Gold Cup

Bhaichung Stadium is a football stadium in Namchi, the headquarters of South Sikkim district in the state of Sikkim, India. The stadium has a disputed capacity between 7,500 and 15,000. It was named after Bhaichung Bhutia, the first Indian footballer to play 100 International matches.

== See also ==
- Sikkim Football Association
- Paljor Stadium
