= Gangtok Himalayan SC =

Association football club in Sikkim, India

Gangtok Himalayan
- Full name: Gangtok Himalayan Sporting Club
- Nickname: The Himalayans
- Short name: GHSC; SHSC
- Founded: 2012; 14 years ago (as Sikkim Himalayan SC)
- Ground: Paljor Stadium
- Capacity: 30,000
- Owner: Tenzing Lamtha
- Head coach: Alpan Lepcha
- League: SFA A-Division S-League; Sikkim Premier League
Home colours	Away colours	Third colours

Gangtok Himalayan Sporting Club (also known as Sikkim Himalayan) is an Indian professional football club based in Gangtok, Sikkim. The club primarily plays in the SFA "A" Division S-League.

The club is also a frequent participant of the Sikkim Gold Cup, a premier club tournament in the state.

== History ==
=== Formation and journey ===
Gangtok Himalayan FC (originally known as Sikkim Himalayan SC) was founded in 2012 in Tathangchen, Gangtok, the capital city of the Indian state Sikkim, and affiliated with Sikkim Football Association (SFA). Since then, they have been participating in various domestic and amateur tournaments regionally. The club was founded by Tenzing Lamtha. In October 2014, Gangtok Himalayan participated in Sikkim Governor's Gold Cup and reached to the semi-finals, but their journey ended with a 2–1 defeat to ONGC FC. In September 2015, former India international Arjunan Shanta Kumar was appointed as manager of the club.

In January 2016, they were officially certified by the All India Football Federation to participate in the I-League 2nd Division, the second tier of football in India, after finishing 2nd in the Sikkim Premier Division League. This move began a new chapter for Gangtok-based side as they became one of first professional football clubs from the North East India. 2016 was the most successful season for Gangtok Himalayan, in which they participated in the I-League 2nd Division, Durand Cup, Sikkim Governor's Gold Cup and Sikkim Premier Division League. After finishing 2nd in the group A of the 2015–16 I-League 2nd Division, Gangtok Himalayan qualified for the 2015–16 I-League 2nd Division final round. There they finished as 5th and failed to qualify for the I-League.

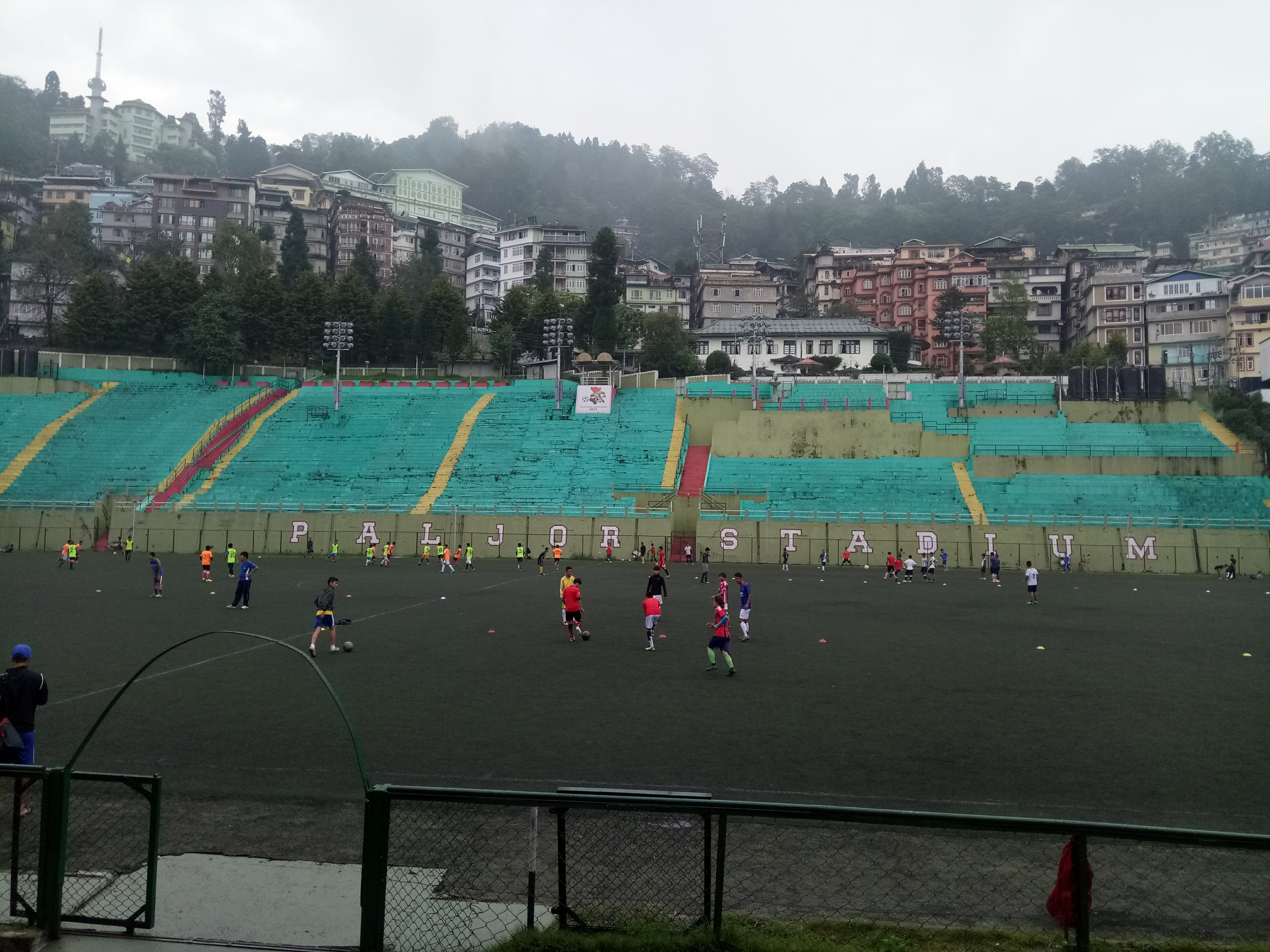
Gangtok Himalayan players in training at the Paljor Stadium, Gangtok, in 2017.

In 2016 Durand Cup, the Himalayans finished 5th, behind Indian Navy in the group A with 6 points. In 2016, the club took part in Sikkim Governor's Gold Cup, in which they reached quarter-finals defeating Nepali outfit Manang Marshyangdi 4–0. In 2019, they reached to the final of 39th edition of the Sikkim Governor's Gold Cup final defeating Royal FC Siliguri 3–1, but lost the title winning match to Mohammedan Sporting by 2–1 margin. In that year, Gangtok Himalayan lifted Sikkim Independence Day Open Football Tournament trophy defeating Sikkim Aacraman FC via penalty shoot-out.

=== I-League fate ===
The All India Football Federation were all set to invite bids for vacant spots in the I-League and Gangtok-based Sikkim Himalayan was one of the front-runners to join, but it was not materialized.

=== 2020–present ===
In 2020, Gangtok Himalayan went to Nepal for participating in the 18th Aaha! Rara Gold Cup, but their journey ended after a 3–0 defeat to Three Star Club in quarter-finals. The club took part in the 2024 Sikkim Gold Cup. In that tournament, they defeated visiting Malaysian team Kelantan Darul Naim by 3–0 in the quarter-finals. The club later reached the final, but lost the title in penalty shoot-out (4–3) to NorthEast United.

== Rivalry ==
Gangtok Himalayan has a rivalry with their fellow Sikkim based club United Sikkim FC, whom they usually face in regional tournaments including Sikkim Premier Division League. The rivalry is commonly referred to as "Sikkim Derby". Both the clubs mostly use Paljor Stadium as their home ground. One of their most memorable matches was on 9 November 2019 during Sikkim Governor's Gold Cup, and Gangtok Himalayan won by 3–1.

== Stadium ==
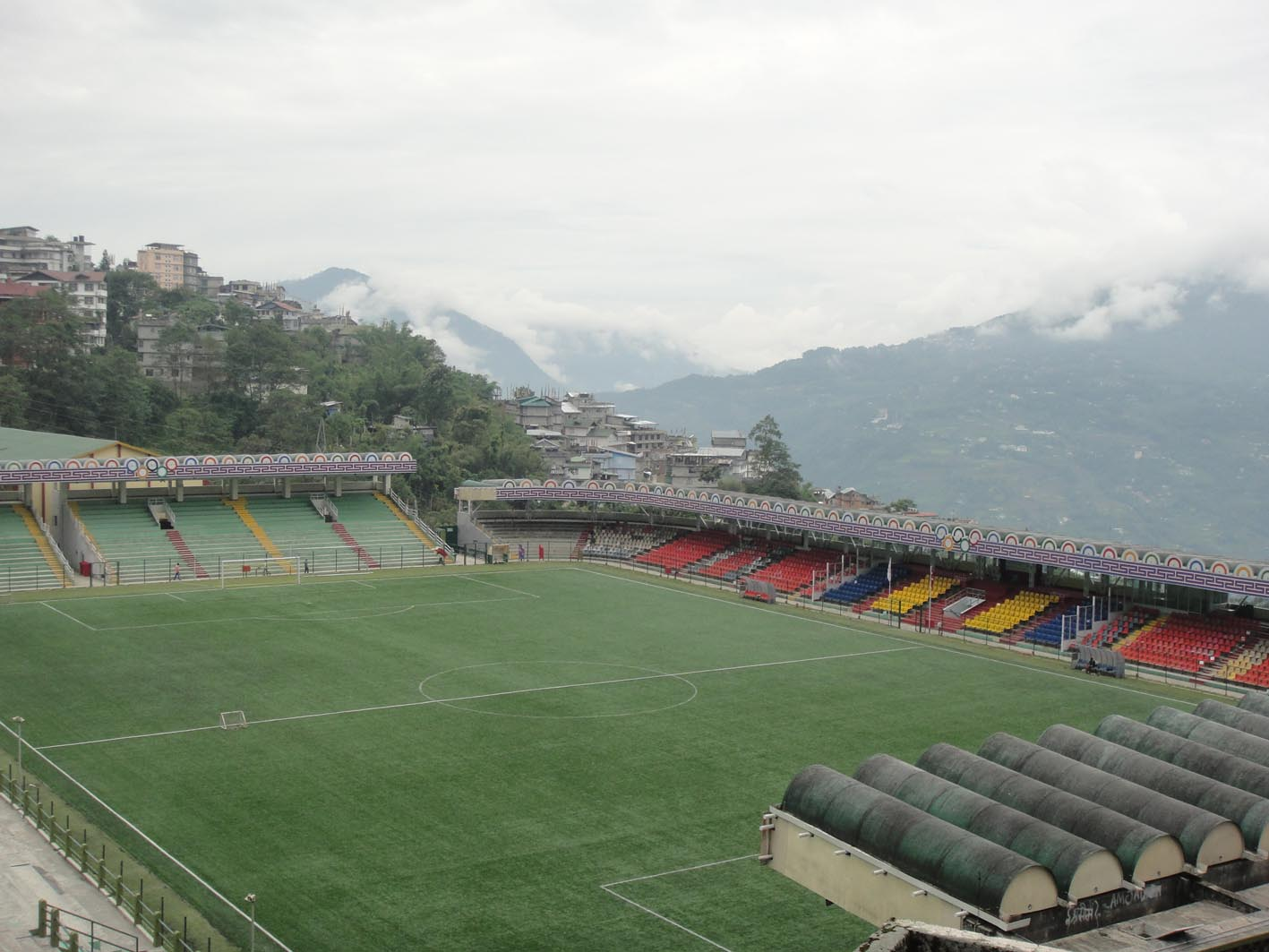
Aerial view of Paljor Stadium, home of Sikkim Himalayan FC

For I-League 2nd Division, the club announced that they would play their home matches at the 30,000 seater Paljor Stadium in the capital of Sikkim, Gangtok. The club has also used the stadium for matches of regional tournaments like Sikkim Premier Division League. It was opened in 1943 and has artificial turf.

== Kit manufacturers and shirt sponsors ==
Period	Kit manufacturer	Shirt sponsor
2015—2020	Vamos	Organic Sikkim

== Past internationals ==
- The players below had senior or age-level international cap(s) for their respective countries or autonomous regions. Players whose name is listed, represented their countries before or after playing for Gangtok Himalayan SC.
- (Nepal) Palsang Lama (2013–2015)
- (Tibet) Tashi Samphel (2016–2018)
- (Tibet) (Nepal) Tashi Tsering (2009–2010)
- (Tibet) Tsering Dhundup (2007–2008)
- (Tibet) Pema Lhundup (2018–2019)
- (Nepal) Yogesh Gurung (2013–2014)
- (Tibet) Karma Tsewang (2015–2017)
- (Nigeria) Stephen Harry (2017–2018)

== Honours ==
=== League ===
- Sikkim Premier Division League
  - Champions (1): 2014
  - Runners-up (1): 2016, 2023

=== Cup ===
- Sikkim Governor's Gold Cup
  - Runners-up (2): 2019, 2024
- Sikkim Independence Day Championship
  - Champions (1): 2019
- Kohima Royal Gold Cup
  - Champions (1): 1996
- Darjeeling Gurkha Gold Cup
  - Runners-up (1): 2012
- Gyalyum Chenmo Memorial Gold Cup
  - Runners-up (1): 2018
- Bimal Ghosh Memorial Trophy
  - Runners-up (1): 2019

=== Women's ===
- Sikkim Women's Football League
  - Runners-up (1): 2026

== Team records ==
=== Wins against foreign teams ===
Competition	Round	Year	Opposition	Score	Venue	City	Ref
Sikkim Governor's Gold Cup	Quarter-final	2016	(Nepal) Manang Marshyangdi	4–0	Paljor Stadium	Gangtok	
Sikkim Governor's Gold Cup	Quarter-final	2024	(Malaysia) Kelantan Darul Naim	3–0	Paljor Stadium	Gangtok	

== Other departments ==
=== Youth football ===
The club has been operating various youth men's teams for regional tournaments. In 2013, their U-14 team took part in Snow Lion Cup, hosted by United Sikkim. The club took part in Hero Junior League.

=== Futsal ===
Gangtok Himalayan has men's futsal section, that participated in tournaments like Chandmari Futsal Championship.

== See also ==
- List of football clubs in India
- Northeast Derby (India)

== Notes ==
1. Besides Nepal national football team, Tashi Tsering also represented Tibet national football team in non-FIFA international matches.
2. Karma Tsewang is an Indian-born footballer, who represents Tibet national football team in non-FIFA international matches.

== Future reading ==
- Pradhan, Sujal (16 June 2023). "Sikkim Premier Division League 2023 to kick off on June 21st". indiatodayne.in. Gangtok: India Today North East. Archived from the original on 16 June 2023.
- "Rohit double helps DSK Shivajians overcome Gangtok Himalayan". The Times of India. PTI. 31 August 2016. Archived from the original on 14 August 2021.
- "Bhaichung Bhutia shuts down former I-League club United Sikkim". indianexpress.com. Gangtok: The Indian Express. Press Trust of India. 22 September 2019. Archived from the original on 27 September 2019.
- Bhattacharya, Nikhilesh (5 December 2012). "Not just about the money — Bhaichung Bhutia's United Sikkim FC faces challenges that test him as an administrator". LiveMint.com. Gangtok. Archived from the original on 30 October 2023.
