= Sikkim Gold Cup =

Indian football tournament

- Organiser(s): Sikkim Football Association (SFA)
- Founded: 1979; 47 years ago
- Region: India
- Teams: Various
- Current champions: Shillong Lajong (1st title)
- Most championships: Mohun Bagan (10 titles)
- 2026 Sikkim Gold Cup

The Sikkim Gold Cup, also known as the All India Governor's Gold Cup, is an Indian football tournament held in Sikkim and organized by the Sikkim Football Association (SFA).

== History ==
Some of the past champions include New Road Team of Nepal in 2007, Three Star Club in 2008, ONGC FC in 2010, Mohammedan Sporting in 2016, and Mohun Bagan in 2017.

== Venue ==
Sikkim Gold Cup matches are played at the Paljor Stadium, Gangtok.

== Results ==
List of winners and runners-up:

| Year | Winners | Score | Runners-up |
|---|---|---|---|
| 1979 | Gangtok Municipal Corporation (GMC) | – | BSF (Kadamtala) |
| 1980 | Mohammedan | – | Rajasthan Club (Calcutta) |
| 1981 | Mafatlal SC (Mumbai) | – | ITI (Bangalore) |
| 1982 | Punjab Police | – | Punjab State Electricity Board |
| 1983 | Punjab Police | – | (Bhutan) Thimpu XI |
| 1984 | Mohun Bagan and Jamshedpur XI (joint winners) | | |
| 1985 | Mohun Bagan | – | Mohammedan |
| 1986 | Mohun Bagan | – | Mohammedan |
| 1987 | Sesa | 0–0 (5–3 p) | Mohammedan |
| 1988 | (Nepal) JCF | – | Eastern Command |
| 1989 | Mohun Bagan | – | Mohammedan |
| 1990 | Royal Nepal Airlines Club (RNAC) | – | Bank of India |
| 1991 | Mohun Bagan | 2–1 | Mohammedan |
| 1992 | Mohun Bagan | – | (Bangladesh) Muktijoddha Sangsad |
| 1993 | Rising Star Club | – | (Bangladesh) Victoria |
| 1994 | Mohun Bagan | – | Army XI |
| 1995 | Punjab Police | – | Mohun Bagan |
| 1996 | Air India | 0–0 (4–3 p) | Mohun Bagan |
| 1997 | All-Nepal FA XI | 2–1 | East Bengal |
| 1998 | All-Nepal FA XI | 2–1 | Army XI |
| 1999 | Army XI | 3–1 | Kerala Police |
| 2000 | Mohun Bagan | 3–0 | Air India |
| 2001 | Mohun Bagan | 4–0 | (Bangladesh) Arambagh KS |
| 2002 | BSF | 3–0 | (Bangladesh) Arambagh KS |
| 2003 | Tata Football Academy | 1–0 | Air India |
| 2004 | EverReady SA | 1–1 (4–2 p) | All-Nepal FA XI |
| 2005 | BSF | 1–1 (4–2 p) | Tata Football Academy |
| 2006 | Air India | 2–2 (4–1 p) | Army XI |
| 2007 | (Nepal) New Road Team | 2–1 | (Nepal) Three Star Club |
| 2008 | (Nepal) Three Star Club | 1–0 | Army XI |
| 2009 | Calcutta Port Trust | 1–0 | BNR Kolkata |
| 2010 | ONGC | 3–1 | Bengal Mumbai |
| 2011 | The tournament was not held | | |
| 2012 | BSF | 0–0 (3–0 p) | (Nepal) Three Star Club |
| 2013 | (Nepal) Three Star Club | 3–1 | (Nepal) Manang Marshyangdi Club |
| 2014 | ONGC | 2–2 (2–0 p) | (Nepal) Manang Marshyangdi Club |
| 2015 | The tournament was not held | | |
| 2016 | Mohammedan | 1–0 | (Nepal) Jhapa XI |
| 2017 | Mohun Bagan | 1–0 | Calcutta Customs |
| 2018 | (Nepal) Manang Marshyangdi Club | 1–0 | Army XI |
| 2019 | Mohammedan | 2–1 | Gangtok Himalayan |
| 2024 | NorthEast United | 0–0 (4–3 p) | Gangtok Himalayan |
| 2025 | Rajasthan United | 1–0 | Services |
| 2026 | Shillong Lajong | 5–2 | Sikkim Aakraman |

== See also ==
- SFA A-Division S-League
- Sikkim Premier League
- Bhaichung Stadium
