= United Sikkim FC =

Association football club in Gangtok, India

United Sikkim
- Full name: United Sikkim Football Club
- Nickname: The Snow Lions
- Short name: USFC
- Founded: 2011; 15 years ago
- Ground: Paljor Stadium; Bhaichung Stadium (selected matches)
- Capacity: 30,000; 15,000
- Owner: Bhaichung Bhutia
Home colours	Away colours	Third colours

United Sikkim Football Club is an Indian professional football club based in Gangtok, Sikkim. Incorporated in 2011, the club usually competed in the Sikkim Premier Division League. United Sikkim is the only club from Sikkim to have played in the I-League, which was then the top tier of the Indian football league system.

Nicknamed the "Snow Lions", United Sikkim uses Paljor Stadium as home ground. It is owned by former India captain Bhaichung Bhutia, and was founded in order to give people of the Indian state of Sikkim a professional football team. In September 2019, Bhaichung Bhutia announced shutting the club down due to some unavoidable circumstances. During an emotional farewell event, he thanked all the players, staff and fans who supported the club over the years.

The club was revived again in January 2021, with aim to play in the Indian Super League. Besides inaugurating the senior and youth team, emphasis would be laid on bringing footballers from the villages.

== History ==
=== Foundation ===
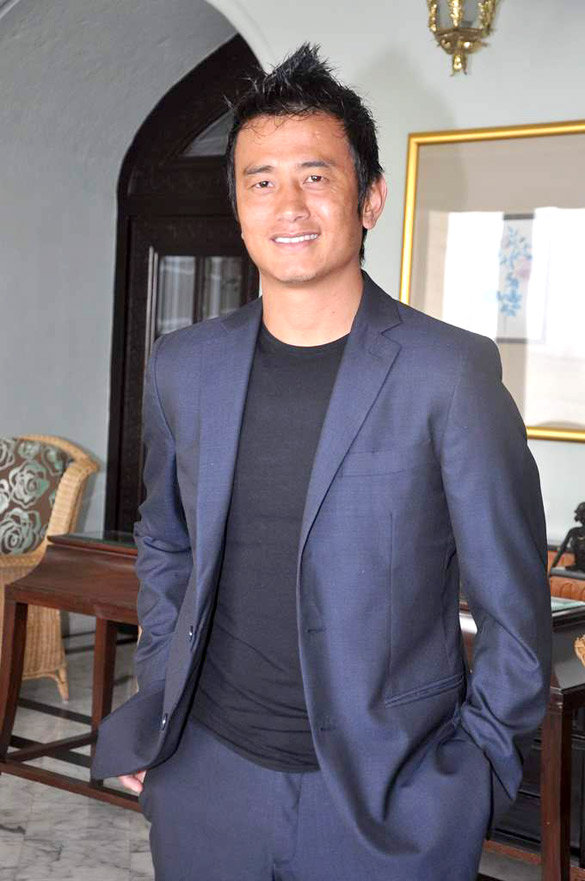
Bhaichung Bhutia, founder president and former captain of United Sikkim.

The professional club was founded in 2011 by the Sikkim Football Association (SFA), Baichung Bhutia, already competing in the Sikkim Gold Cup and other all-India tournaments in the early years of their existence. On 22 March 2011, the club was launched as a professional entity, co-owned by Dubai-based Fidelis World, former India national captain Bhaichung Bhutia and singer Shankar Mahadevan. The club revealed that they would compete in the 2011 I-League 2nd Division, in the quest for promotion to the I-League within the next three years.

=== 2011–2012: 2nd Division seasons ===
The club started their quest for the I-League on 27 February 2011. The club played their first match against Langsning F.C. on 31 March 2012, in which they drew 2–2. United Sikkim won on 5 April 2011 against North Imphal Sporting Association at the Indira Gandhi Athletic Stadium in Assam, by a score of 2–0. The club finished first in group A and qualified for the 2011 I-League 2nd Division final round, in which they only needed to finish in the top two for promotion. The club began final round with three consecutive draws against Sporting Clube de Goa, Royal Wahingdoh and Shillong Lajong, before winning against Mohammedan and Southern Samity. Next, a draw to Ar-Hima and a loss to Vasco officially knocked United Sikkim out of contention for promotion and forced them to settle at fifth place for the season.

The season including the 2012 I-League 2nd Division did not start well for United Sikkim. On 11 June 2011, it was announced that Johnny Menyongar would leave the club to join I-League team Shillong Lajong, as well as Indian internationals Renedy Singh and NS Manju few months later. However, after firing coach Stanley Rozario, United Sikkim signed Belgian Philippe De Ridder. The club re-signed Nigerian players Daniel Bedemi and Quinton Jacobs. They began charge for the I-League for the second season in a row with a 3–2 victory over Bhawanipore F.C. at the Satindra Mohan Dev Stadium in Assam on 2 February 2012. The club went on to win three more matches during the first round, against Eagles, Southern Samity and Ar-Hima, in order to qualify for the final round. They won promotion on the last day of the season at home, in front of 30,000 fans, as United Sikkim drew Mohammedan SC 1–1, with Daniel Bedemi scoring.

On 13 November 2012, Bhutia was named the interim manager to replace Philippe De Ridder, after the club's heavy 1–10 defeat in an I-League match against Prayag United at the Salt Lake Stadium. In August 2012, United Sikkim took part in the Shillong Super Series Football Championship and faced teams like A-League Wellington Phoenix and Shillong Lajong.

=== 2012–2013: I-League ===
It was reported that United Sikkim had started talks with Australian manager Nathan Hall about a possible head coaching role. On 10 December 2012, it was confirmed that Hall had joined the club, replacing interim player-coach Bhaichung Bhutia. His first game came on 15 December against Mumbai at the Balewadi Sports Complex, in which United Sikkim lost 0–1. Hall managed to earn his first point in next match against ONGC on 29 December in which his side drew 1–1 at the Ambedkar Stadium, with Nadong Bhutia scoring the first goal for United Sikkim under Hall.

United Sikkim did not win a single game under Hall until 27 March 2013, when they managed a 5–0 victory over forced-relegated Air India at Paljor Stadium. This would turn out to be United Sikkim's last win and points for the rest of the season, as the side lost its last four matches and was relegated to the I-League 2nd Division.

=== 2013: Travel to Bhutan ===
In March 2013, United Sikkim went to Bhutan for training. In their first foreign tour, they played three friendly matches against local sides Drukpol, Yeedzin and Zimdra at the Changlimithang Stadium in Thimphu.

From July to August, they went to Bhutan again and participated in 2013 King's Cup, in which they moved to the knock-out stages. In the first semi-final, United Sikkim lost 2–4 to Manang Marshyangdi of Nepal.

=== 2014: I-League 2nd Division ===
They also participated in the 2014 I-League 2nd Division and moved to the final round of I-League Qualifiers, finishing on fourth position with seven points in eight matches.

=== 2014–2018 ===
On 18 December 2014, it was revealed by owner Bhaichung Bhutia that United Sikkim had decided to leave the competition as future of the I-League was dim due to the formation of ISL, and thus team would only participate in the local league. In 2016, they took part in Bordoloi Trophy in Assam. In the 2016 edition of Sikkim Governor's Gold Cup, the club reached quarter-finals.

In February 2018, United Sikkim went to Nepal and participated in the 16th edition of Aaha! Rara Gold Cup, in which they failed to reach the knock-out stages. It was the club's second campaign in Aaha! Rara Gold Cup, first being the 2017 edition, in which they tasted a 4–2 defeat in penalty shootout to Sahara Club of Pokhara.

=== 2020–present ===
The All India Football Federation (AIFF) was all set to invite bids for vacant spot in the I-League and Gangtok-based United Sikkim Football Club were one of the front-runners to submit it for 2020–21 season. However, the bid was won by Sudeva Moonlight (currently Sudeva Delhi) from Delhi.

United Sikkim was the club that brought the I-League to the state where league matches were played at Paljor Stadium, and now we want to bring Indian Super League (ISL) to Sikkim. We will continue to give a platform to footballers from Sikkim and the region and in the process, contribute to the development of Indian football. The players will be scouted from different parts of the region

— Bhaichung Bhutia, owner of the club, announcing the revival of United Sikkim in January 2021, and their long-term plan in coming years.

In 2021, Bhaichung Bhutia, the owner of the club announced that it will revive its junior and senior teams while aiming to bring the Indian Super League (ISL) into the state, alongside focusing on its grassroots. They later took part in Birat Gold Cup in Nepal, in 2021. The club later featured in SFA Premier Division League. In October 2022, it was officially announced by the Centre for Bangladesh-India Friendship that United Sikkim is one of the three participating teams from India (others being United Kurseong and Jaigaon FC) for the inaugural edition of the North Bengal International Gold Cup.

== Club crest and kits ==
=== Crest ===
United Sikkim's first crest from 2011 to 2012

United Sikkim's second crest in 2012

logo until 2021

On 22 March 2011, the first crest of United Sikkim were unveiled at Taj Hotel in Kolkata. The club crest had a picture of a 'snow lion', which is also their mascot (and nickname too), and the color of the kit was red with white shorts. The club's away colors are dark and light blue. On 29 August 2012, after gaining promotion to the I-League, the club unveiled their new crest which is dominantly red, unlike orange crests from before. Instead of having "est. 2008" for the founding year, new crest has "est. 2011", which stands for the year when professionalized itself.

=== Kit manufacturers and shirt sponsors ===
Period	Kit manufacturer	Shirt sponsor	Tracksuit uniform
2011	Nike	EMTA	
2012	Nike	URO	
2013–2018	Nike	URO	Kokkivo Clothing
2018–2019	Lotto	Officer's Choice	
2021–2022	Lotto	Cosco	
2022–	Silco	Made in Sikkim, G.O.A.T.	

== Stadiums ==
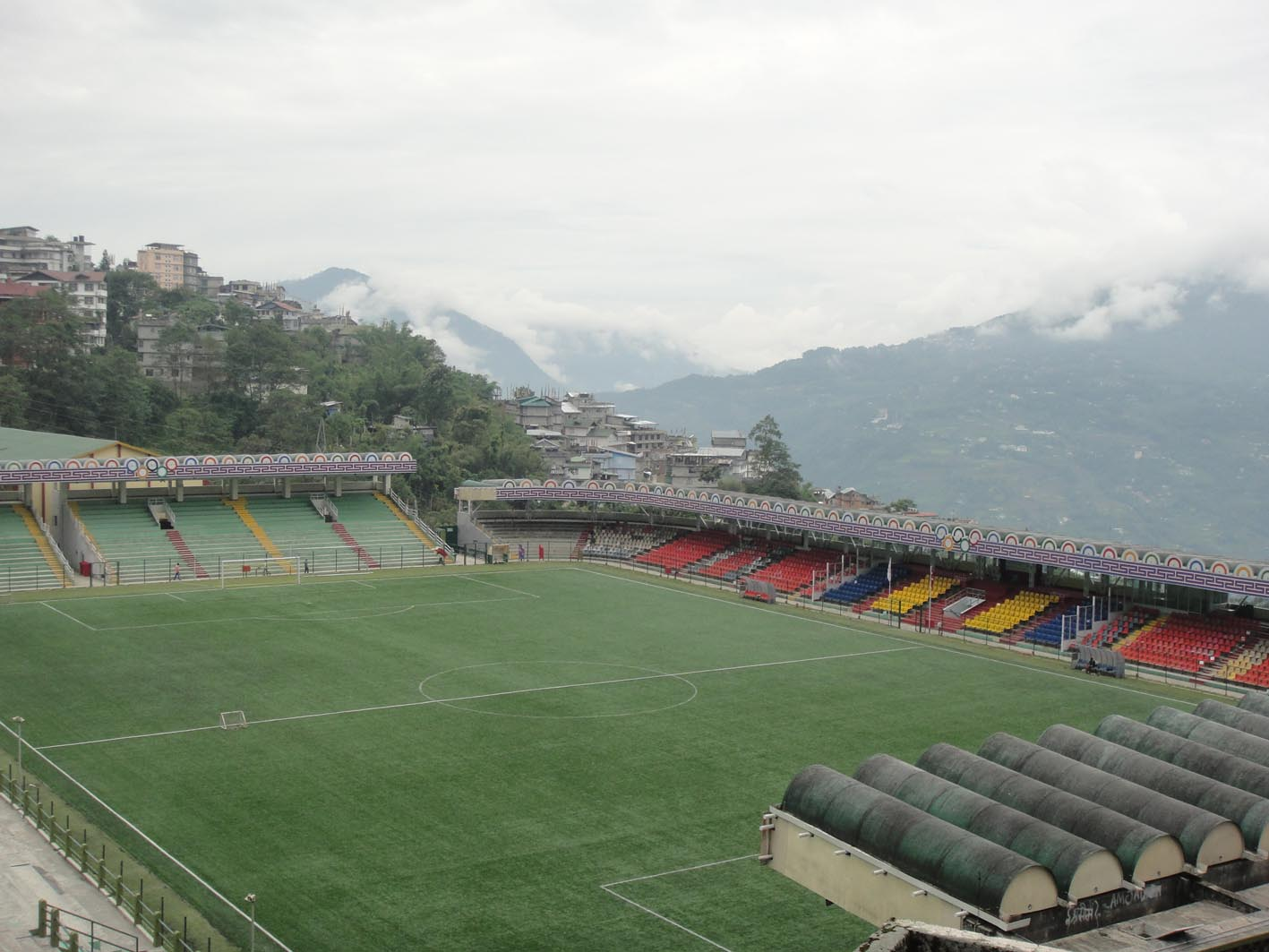
A view of Paljor Stadium

In I-League, the club played their home matches at the 30,000 seater Paljor Stadium in Gangtok. When the club was participating in amateur tournaments from 2008 to 2011, and the I-League 2nd Division from 2011 to 2012, in which they would play in neutral venues, the club used Paljor Stadium as a training ground, holding majority of their practices there.

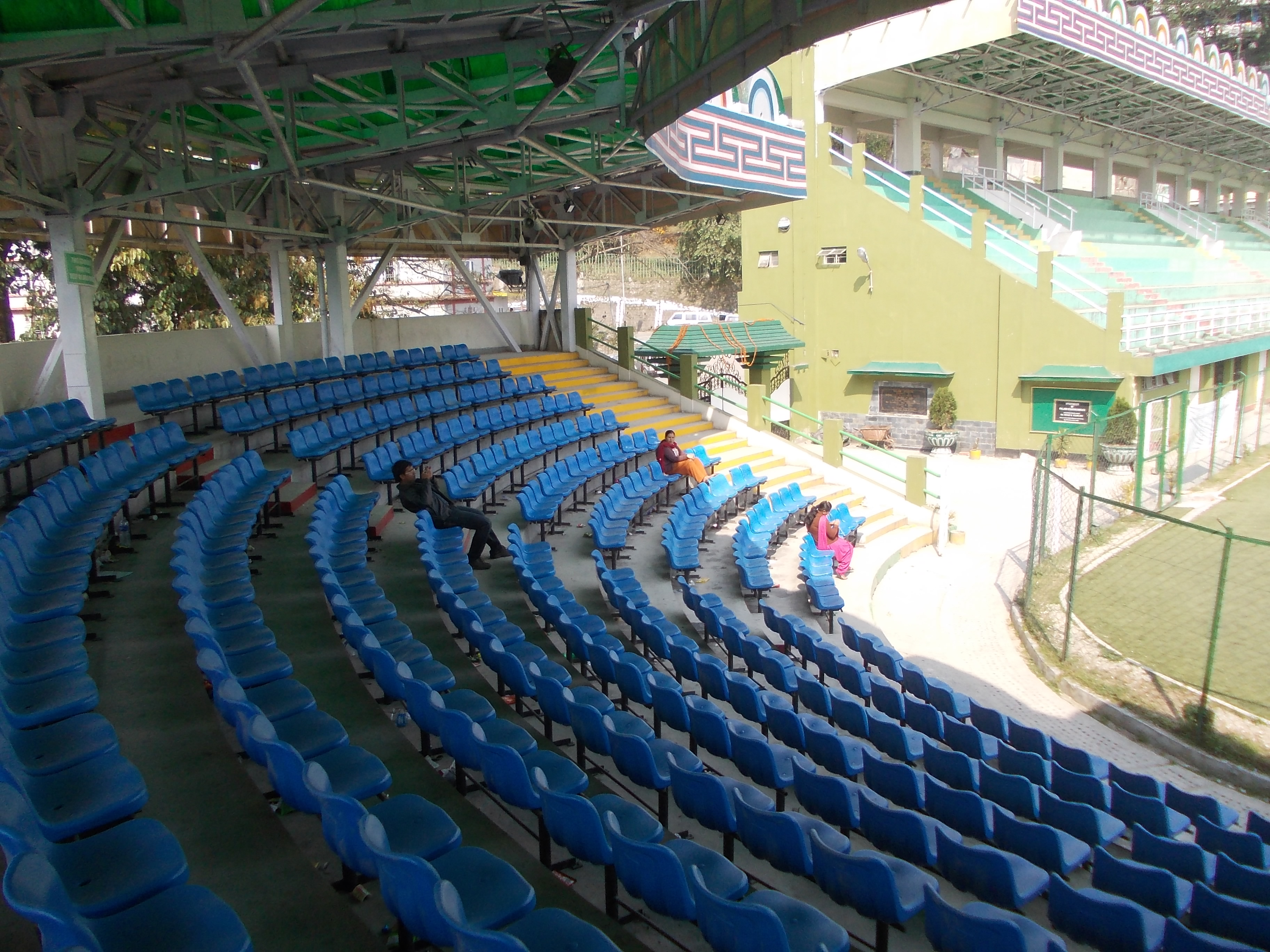
Seats at Paljor Stadium

However, despite the I-League 2nd Division being a neutral competition, the Paljor Stadium was given the rights to host the 2012 I-League 2nd Division final round 2nd leg, in which United Sikkim was also participating. The ground was also the venue for the match in which United Sikkim gained promotion to the I-League after drawing with Mohammedan (1–1).

In November 2021, United Sikkim entered into a joint venture with the Government of Sikkim, renovated Bhaichung Bhutia Stadium in Namchi to use as home ground.

== Rivalry ==
United Sikkim had a rivalry with their fellow North East Indian club Shillong Lajong in the I-League, which was often regarded as the "Northeast India Derby".

=== Northeast Derby (India) ===
Opponent	Played	Wins	Draws	Losses
United Sikkim	2	0	1	1
Shillong Lajong	2	1	1	0
Total	2	1	1	0

=== Sikkim Derby ===
United Sikkim has also a rivalry with their fellow Sikkim-based club Gangtok Himalayan SC, whom they face in regional tournaments including Sikkim Premier Division League. Both the clubs use Paljor Stadium as their home grounds. They had last met each other on 9 November 2019 during a match of Sikkim Governor's Gold Cup and Gangtok Himalayan defeated United by 3–1 margin.

== Managerial history ==
Note: The following list may not be complete

- (India) Stanley Rozario (March – December 2011)
- (Belgium) Philippe De Ridder (3 December 2011 – 13 November 2012)
- (India) Bhaichung Bhutia (13 November – 13 December 2012)
- (Australia) Nathan Hall (13 December 2012 – October 2013)
- (India) Soibam Ekendra Singh (2013–2014)
- (India) Kamal Bagdas (2023–present)

== Notable players ==
Past internationals

The following United Sikkim players have been capped at senior/youth international level, with their respective countries. Years in brackets indicate their spells at the club.

- (Republic of Ireland) Joseph Lapira (2010–2011)
- (Liberia) Johnny Menyongar (2011)
- (Namibia) Quinton Jacobs (2011–2012)
- (Guam) John Matkin (2012–2013)

World Cup player

- (Costa Rica) Michael Rodríguez (2012–2013)

Noted Indian internationals

- (India) Renedy Singh (2011–2012)
- (India) N. S. Manju (2011–2012)
- (India) Sandesh Jhingan (2011–2013)
- (India) Bhaichung Bhutia (2012–2013)
- (India) Anwar Ali (2012–2013)

Other players

- (Nigeria) Daniel Bedemi (2011–2012)
- (Spain) Pablo Rodríguez (2012–2013)
- (Nigeria) Salau Nuruddin (2012–2013)
- (South Korea) Tae Yoon (2012–2013)
- (Togo) Dosseh Attivi (2012–2013)
- (Australia) Steve Hayes (2013)
- (Nigeria) Oluwaunmi Somide (2013–2014)

== Honours ==
=== Domestic league ===
- I-League 2
  - Runners-up (1): 2012
- Sikkim Premier Division League
  - Champions (3): 2013, 2017, 2018
  - Runners-up (1): 2014

=== Cup ===
- Darjeeling Gold Cup
  - Runners-up (1): 2011

=== Other achievements ===
- Jigme Dorji Wangchuk Memorial Gold Cup
  - Semi-finals: 2013
- Bordoloi Trophy
  - Semi-finals (1): 2016

== Team records ==
=== Notable wins against foreign teams ===
As of matches played 2 August 2013

Competition	Round	Year	Opposition	Score	Venue	City	Ref
Sikkim Governor's Gold Cup	Pre quarter-finals	2011	Bhutan XI	1–0	Paljor Stadium	Gangtok	
Jigme Dorji Wangchuk Memorial Gold Cup	Group stage	2013	(Bhutan) Thimphu City	2–0	Changlimithang Stadium	Thimphu	
Bordoloi Trophy	Group stage	2016	(Bangladesh) Bongobir Agragami	1–0	Jawaharlal Nehru Stadium	Guwahati	

== Academy and youth ==
United Sikkim, under stewardship of Bhaichung Bhutia, took up initiatives of youth development in football. In 2013, Snow Lion Cup for under-14 kids was incorporated, and coaching camps with grassroot framework in hilly areas of Sikkim, Kalimpong and Darjeeling were set up by the club, with partnership of State Bank of India and Bhaichung Bhutia Football Schools.

USFC academy honours

- U-17 Winter Cup
  - Champions (1): 2023
- U-14 Winter Cup
  - Runners-up (1): 2023

== See also ==
- List of United Sikkim F.C. managers
- List of football clubs in India
