= Bhaichung Bhutia =

Indian footballer (born 1976)

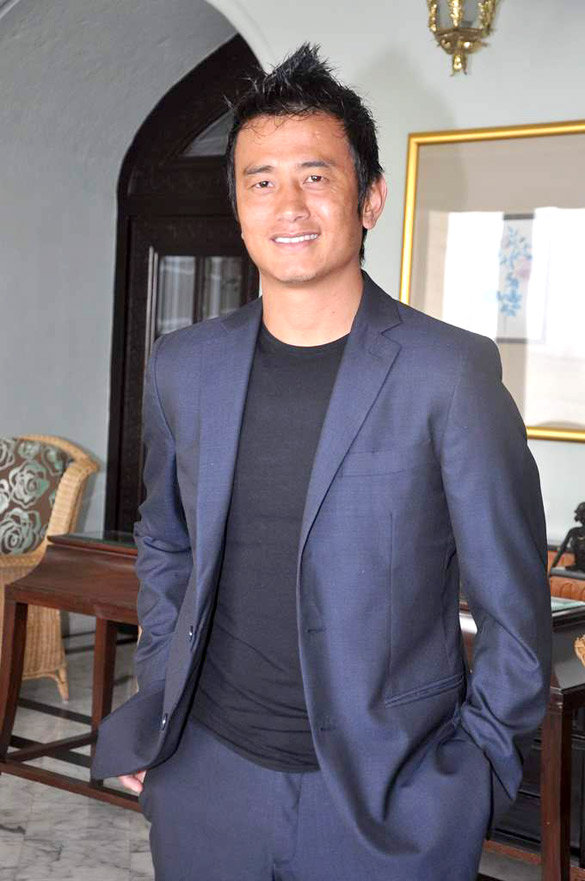
- Bhutia in 2012

Personal information
- Full name: Bhaichung Bhutia
- Date of birth: 15 December 1976 (age 49)
- Place of birth: Tinkitam, Sikkim, India
- Height: 1.73 m (5 ft 8 in)
- Position: Striker

Senior career*
Years	Team	Apps	(Gls)
1993–1995	East Bengal	9	(17)
1995–1997	JCT	20	(15)
1997–1999	East Bengal	31	(15)
1999–2002	Bury	37	(8)
2002–2003	Mohun Bagan	11	(6)
2003	→ Perak (loan)	8	(4)
2003–2005	East Bengal	38	(21)
2005	Selangor MK Land	5	(3)
2005–2006	East Bengal	16	(12)
2006–2009	Mohun Bagan	45	(19)
2009–2011	East Bengal	3	(2)
2012–2013	United Sikkim	3	(1)
2015	East Bengal	0	(0)
Total		227	(123)

International career
1992–1996	India U23	12	(9)
1995–2011	India	83	(27)

Managerial career
- 2012: United Sikkim
- 2018: Sikkim
Medal record
India
AFC Challenge Cup
Winner	2008 India
SAFF Championship
Winner	1997 Nepal
Winner	1999 India
Winner	2005 Pakistan
Runner-up	1995 Sri Lanka
Runner-up	2008 Maldives & Sri Lanka
- * Club domestic league appearances and goals

Bhaichung Bhutia (born 15 December 1976), also spelled as Baichung Bhutia, is an Indian former professional footballer who played as a striker. Bhutia is considered as the torchbearer of Indian football in the international arena. He is often nicknamed the Sikkimese Sniper because of his shooting skills in football. Three-time Indian Player of the Year I. M. Vijayan described Bhutia as "God's gift to Indian football".

Bhutia has had four spells at then I-League side East Bengal FC, the club where he started his career. When he joined English club Bury in 1999, he became the first Indian footballer to sign a contract with a European club and only the second to play professionally in Europe, after Mohammed Salim. Afterwards he had a short loan spell at the Malaysian football club Perak FA. He has also played for JCT Mills, which won the league once during his tenure; and Mohun Bagan, which failed to win the league once during his two spells, in his native India. His international footballing honours include winning the Nehru Cup, LG Cup, SAFF Championship three times and the AFC Challenge Cup. He is also India's second most capped player, with 80 international caps to his name.

Off the field, Bhutia is known for winning the reality television programme Jhalak Dikhhla Jaa, which caused much controversy with his then-club Mohun Bagan, and for being the first Indian athlete to boycott the Olympic torch relay in support of the Tibetan independence movement. Bhutia, who has a football stadium named after him in honour of his contribution to Indian football (first player to have such honour while he is still playing), has also won many awards, such as the Arjuna Award and the Padma Shri.

In October 2010, he founded Bhaichung Bhutia Football Schools in Delhi in partnership with football by Carlos Queiroz and Nike. In August 2011, Bhutia announced his retirement from international football. His farewell match was with the India national team on 10 January 2012 against Bayern Munich at the Jawaharlal Nehru Stadium, Delhi.

Bhutia in the general election of All India Football Federation (AIFF) for the president post; lost 33–1 to Kalyan Chaubey. He also served as president of the Sikkim Football Association.

== Early life ==
Bhaichung Bhutia was born in an agricultural Nepali speaking Bhutia family and has a brother Anurudhha Sablania. Both of his parents were farmers in Sikkim and were originally not keen on Bhutia's interest in sports. His father died in his childhood, but after encouragement from his uncle, Karma Bhutia, he started his education at St. Xavier's School, Pakyong, Sikkim. At the age of nine he won a football scholarship from SAI to attend the Tashi Namgyal Academy in Gangtok.

Bhutia went on to play for several schools and local clubs in his home state of Sikkim, including the Gangtok-based Boys Club, which was managed by Karma. His performance at the 1992 Subroto Cup, where he won the "Best Player" award, brought him to the notice of the football establishment. Former India goalkeeper Bhaskar Ganguly spotted his talent and helped him make the transition to Calcutta football. In addition to football, Bhutia also represented his school at badminton, basketball, and athletics.

== Club career ==
=== Kolkata and Europe ===
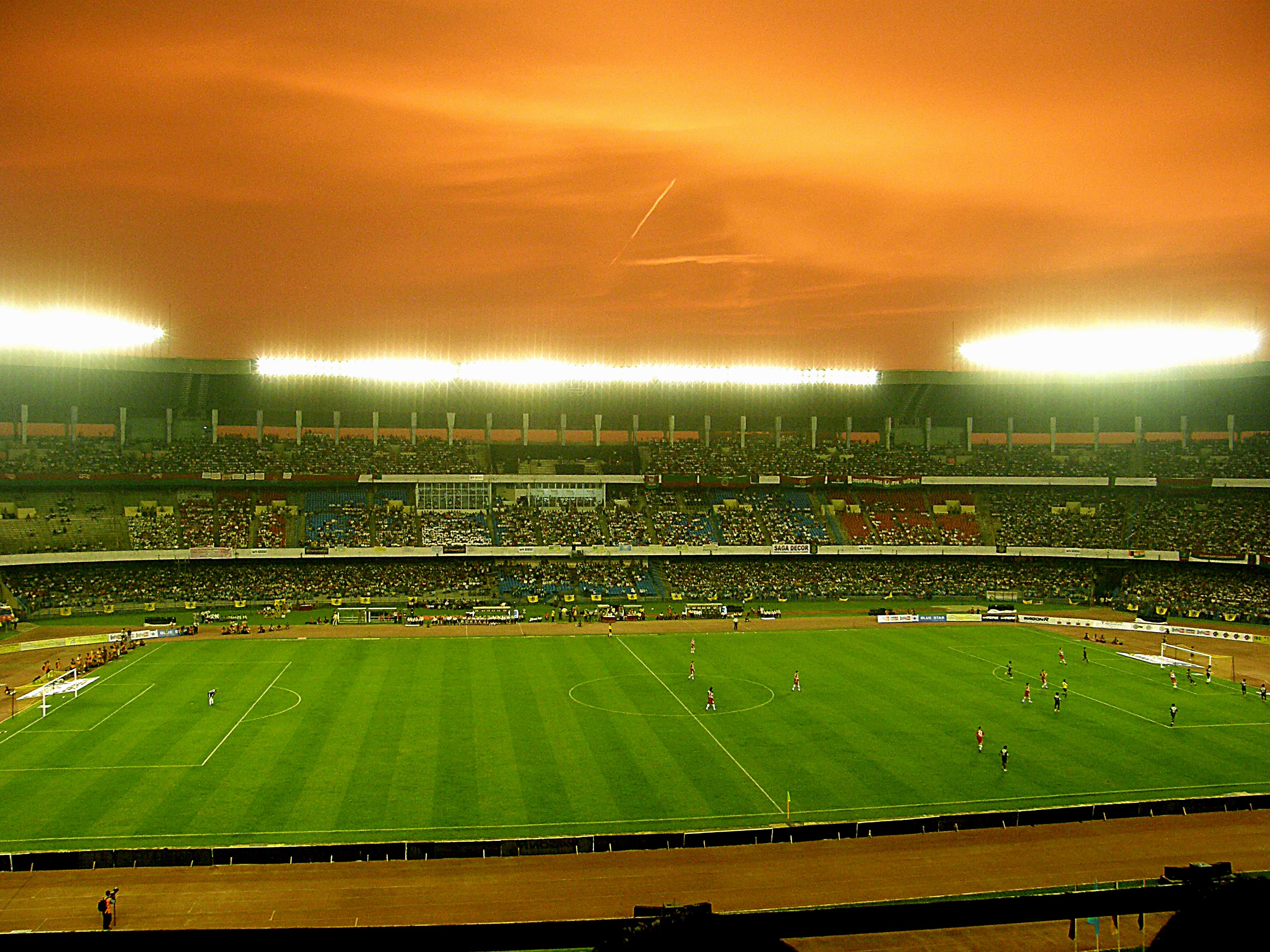
Yuva Bharati Krirangan – home stadium of East Bengal Club and Mohun Bagan

In 1993, at the age of sixteen, Bhutia left school to join the professional East Bengal F.C. in Kolkata. Two years later, he transferred to JCT Mills in Phagwara, which went on to win the India National Football League in the 1996–97 season. Bhutia was the top goalscorer in the league, and was chosen to make his international debut in the Nehru Cup. He was named "1996 Indian Player of the Year".

In 1997, Bhutia returned to East Bengal. He has the distinction of scoring the first hat-trick in the local derby between East Bengal and Mohun Bagan, when he registered one in East Bengal's 4–1 victory in the 1997 Federation Cup semi-final. He became team captain in the 1998–99 season, during which East Bengal finished second behind Salgaocar in the league. Furthermore, he became the 19th footballer to receive the Arjuna Award in 1999, which the Government of India gives out to athletes to recognise their "outstanding achievements" in national sports.

=== Bury ===
"His presence will be a big boost to the confidence of many Asian youngsters."

— Piara Power, Let's Kick Racism Out of Football campaign co-ordinator, after Bhutia signed for Bury.

Bhutia has had limited opportunities in playing overseas. On 30 September 1999, he travelled overseas to play for Bury in Greater Manchester, England. He became only the second Indian footballer to play professionally in Europe after Mohammed Salim. By penning a three-year contract he also became the first Indian footballer to sign for a European club. This followed unsuccessful trials for Bhutia with Fulham, West Bromwich Albion and Aston Villa. He had difficulty in obtaining a visa and could not make his debut, until 3 October 1999 against Cardiff City. In that match, he came on as a substitute for Ian Lawson and played a part in Bury's second goal, which was scored by Darren Bullock after Bhutia's volley was deflected into his path. On 15 April 2000, he scored his first goal in the English league in the game against Chesterfield. A recurring knee injury limited him to only three games in his final season at Bury, and he was released after the club was placed in administration. His final appearance was a 3–0 defeat to Swindon Town on 27 August 2001.

=== Return to India ===
In 2002, Bhutia returned to India and played for Mohun Bagan for a year. However, he was injured early in the season and failed to play again that season, missing Mohun Bagan's only trophy win; the All Airlines Gold Cup.

Afterwards, Bhutia again returned to the East Bengal Club, helping them to win the ASEAN Club Championship.

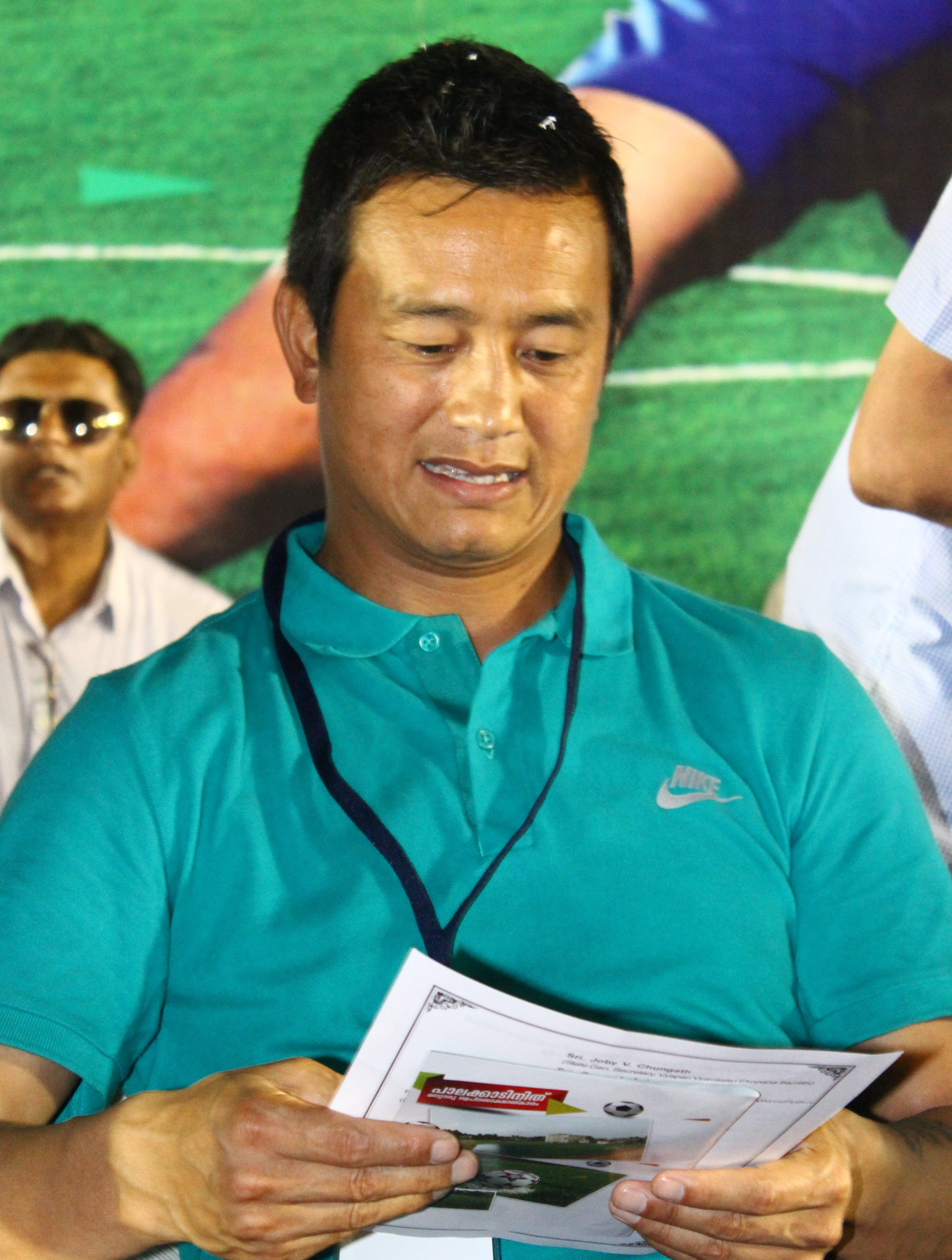
Bhaichung Bhutia in the inauguration ceremony of Palakkad Noorani Football stadium

He scored a goal in the final, a 3–1 win over Tero Sasana, and was named the "man of the match". He finished as the top scorer of the Championship with nine goals. He also scored in the 1–1 draw against Petrokimia Putra and scored five goals in a 6–0 win against Philippine Army in the same tournament.

Bhutia signed up to play for Perak FA, the Malaysian championship club, from August to October 2003 on loan and returned to East Bengal Club for the regular season. However, his stint at Perak FA ended in a 3–1 defeat against Sabah FA in the Malaysia Cup semi-finals, after which Bhutia described himself as the "villain of the piece".

In the 2003–04 season, Bhutia scored 12 goals as East Bengal won the league by four points from second-placed Dempo. During the 2004–05 season, Bhutia scored nine goals for East Bengal, which finished in third place behind SC Goa and champions Dempo. He continued to play for East Bengal until the end of the 2005–06 season. In his final season there he was awarded the "Player of the National Football League" by the All India Football Federation (AIFF) in a season where he scored 12 goals. Despite this, East Bengal finished runners-up to Mahindra United in the league.

=== Back to Malaysia ===
In 2005, Bhutia signed for another Malaysian club, Selangor MK Land. He made five appearances only, scoring one goal, as the club had monetary problems. Before, he received an offer from then Home United manager Steve Darby, but rejected the offer. Darby later revealed that he failed to sign Bhutia because the offer he made was less than what he was getting in India that time.

=== Mohun Bagan ===
"I will try to live up to the expectations of Mohun Bagan supporters and bring success to the team this time."

— Bhaichung Bhutia, on signing for Mohun Bagan a second time.

On 15 June 2006, he joined Mohun Bagan and formed an attacking partnership with Jose Ramirez Barreto. However, the 2006–07 season was a poor one for Bhutia and Mohun Bagan as they finished eighth in the league, just one position above relegation. During the 2007–08 season (the league was now known as the I-League), Bhutia scored 10 goals in 18 matches, and Mohun Bagan finished slightly higher in the league in fourth place. Bhutia won the Indian Player of the Year for the second time in 2008. In winning the award, he became only the second footballer to win it more than once; the other was I. M. Vijayan. In the 2008–09 season, despite a 10-match winning streak, Mohun Bagan finished in second place behind Churchill Brothers because of a final day loss to Mahindra United. Bhutia finished the season with six goals.

On 18 May 2009, Bhutia announced he would quit Mohun Bagan, due to the questioning of his footballing commitment by the club's officials. As a result of the Jhalak Dikhhla Jaa incident, he was suspended for six months by Mohun Bagan. Bhutia was quoted saying "It is just a ploy to keep me at Mohun Bagan for another season. But I will not play for them any more."

=== East Bengal (IV) ===
"I want to tell the millions of East Bengal supporters that I am going to finish my career here. It is not going to be a matter of [a] few months but for the rest of my life."

— Bhaichung Bhutia, on signing for East Bengal a fourth time.

Bhutia was reported to have officially signed for East Bengal on 22 June 2009, on a one-year contract, announcing that he would end his playing career at the club. Upon signing for East Bengal, Bhutia declared it to be his homecoming, "This is really my homecoming. This is the club from where it all started and it is here where it is going to end." The situation was further complicated, however, as Mohun Bagan's general secretary Anjan Mitra said "Our contract with Bhaichung is perfectly legal and he has one more year left with us." Bhutia's lawyer Usha Nath Banerjee countered this, "I doubt the legality of Bagan's contract. In any case, according to FIFA and AIFF rules, a player who is above 28 years of age is free to make a choice of club in the third year of his contract". Bhutia and Mohun Bagan were set to meet on 17 August in the AIFF headquarters to settle their differences with AIFF general secretary Alberto Colaco. On 29 August, it was announced that the issue had not been resolved yet and the outbound Colaco was set to meet Bhutia on 30 August. No compromise was reached, however, and on 5 September former additional solicitor general Amrendra Sharan was appointed to look into the dispute. On 10 September, Bhutia filed defamation charges, claiming damages of ₹10 million, against Mohun Bagan for "trying to tarnish his reputation". Bhutia was granted interim relief on 26 September, but the case between Mohun Bagan and Bhutia is set to continue until a final verdict is reached. On 4 November, it was revealed that Mohun Bagan had approached football's governing body FIFA to intervene in the dispute with Bhutia.

The start of the 2010–11 season would be without Bhutia until the end of January as the India national team prepared and participated in the Asian Cup from November to January. Though laid low by injuries in recent months, Bhutia believes he would return next season after taking a three-month break and if he ever decides to quit, he would do it from East Bengal.

=== United Sikkim ===
In 2012, Bhutia joined United Sikkim as a player-coach.

=== Final stint at East Bengal ===
On 12 February 2015, it was announced that Bhutia would return to East Bengal for the final time on a half-season contract, after which he would retire from professional football. Having retired from India colours in 2011 against South Korea in the AFC Asian Cup, Bhutia last season said he wished to retire donning red and gold colours "one last time".

"But I don't see that happening. I am really struggling with my knee injury and not in a shape to play the top-tier I-League for East Bengal. You can say that I am not going to play club again," Bhutia told reporters at the launch of East Bengal's residential academy in BA-CA ground in Salt Lake.

== International career ==
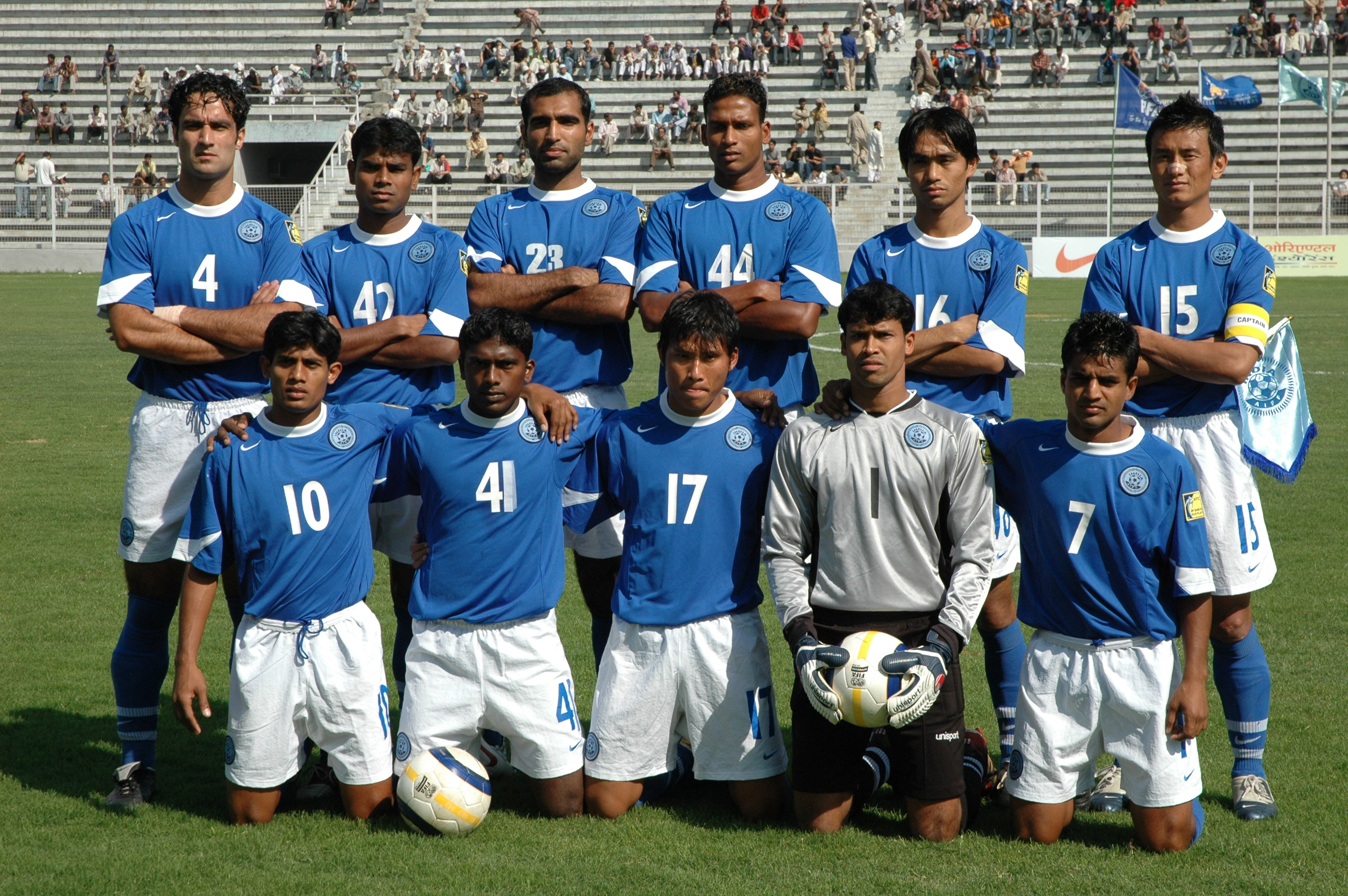
India national team during Asian Cup 2007 qualifiers. Bhutia standing rightmost.

Bhaichung made his senior international debut in the Nehru Cup against Thailand at the age of 19 on 10 March 1995. Bhutia scored for India against Uzbekistan in the 1995 Nehru Cup becoming India's youngest ever goalscorer, at 19. In the 1997 SAFF Championship, India beat the Maldives 5–1 in the final, Bhutia was responsible for one goal. Two years later, the tournament was held in Goa and India successfully defended their title by beating Bangladesh 2–0 in the final. Bhutia scored the second goal for India after Bruno Coutinho opened the scoring and Bhutia was named as the tournament's most valuable player.

He also netted two goals in the final of the 2002 LG Cup held in Vietnam, in which India beat the host nation 3–2, Bhutia's goals came either side of half-time. The football tournament of the 2003 Afro-Asian Games saw India finish as runners-up behind Uzbekistan. Bhutia scored two goals in the tournament, both of which came in the 5–3 semi-final win over Zimbabwe. In the 2007 Nehru Cup, Bhutia scored a penalty in a 6–0 victory over Cambodia in the opening match of the tournament. He also scored in a 1–0 win over Bangladesh and a 3–0 win over Kyrgyzstan. Bhutia played a significant part in the final as he was involved in the build-up to N. P. Pradeep's winning goal against Syria during which India won 1–0 to become champions.

The next successful SAFF Championship was in 2005 where Bhutia was captain, in the group stages he scored a goal in a 3–0 victory over Bhutan but did not score in the other two matches. India progressed to the semi-finals during which Bhutia played in the 1–0 win over the Maldives. The final was a repeat of the 1999 final, as Bangladesh were the opposition, and once again India triumphed 2–0 during which Bhutia scored the second goal in the 81st minute from close range after Mehrajuddin Wadoo's 33rd-minute opener. He received the award for the Most Valuable Player and also the Fair Play trophy. The 2008 SAFF Championship started with a 4–0 win over neighbouring Nepal, Bhutia scored the second goal in the 34th minute. It turned out to be Bhutia's only goal of the tournament, however, he did have several chances to score in the semi-final against Bhutan which saw India win 2–1 to reach the final. In the final, India failed to defend their title after losing 1–0 to the Maldives.

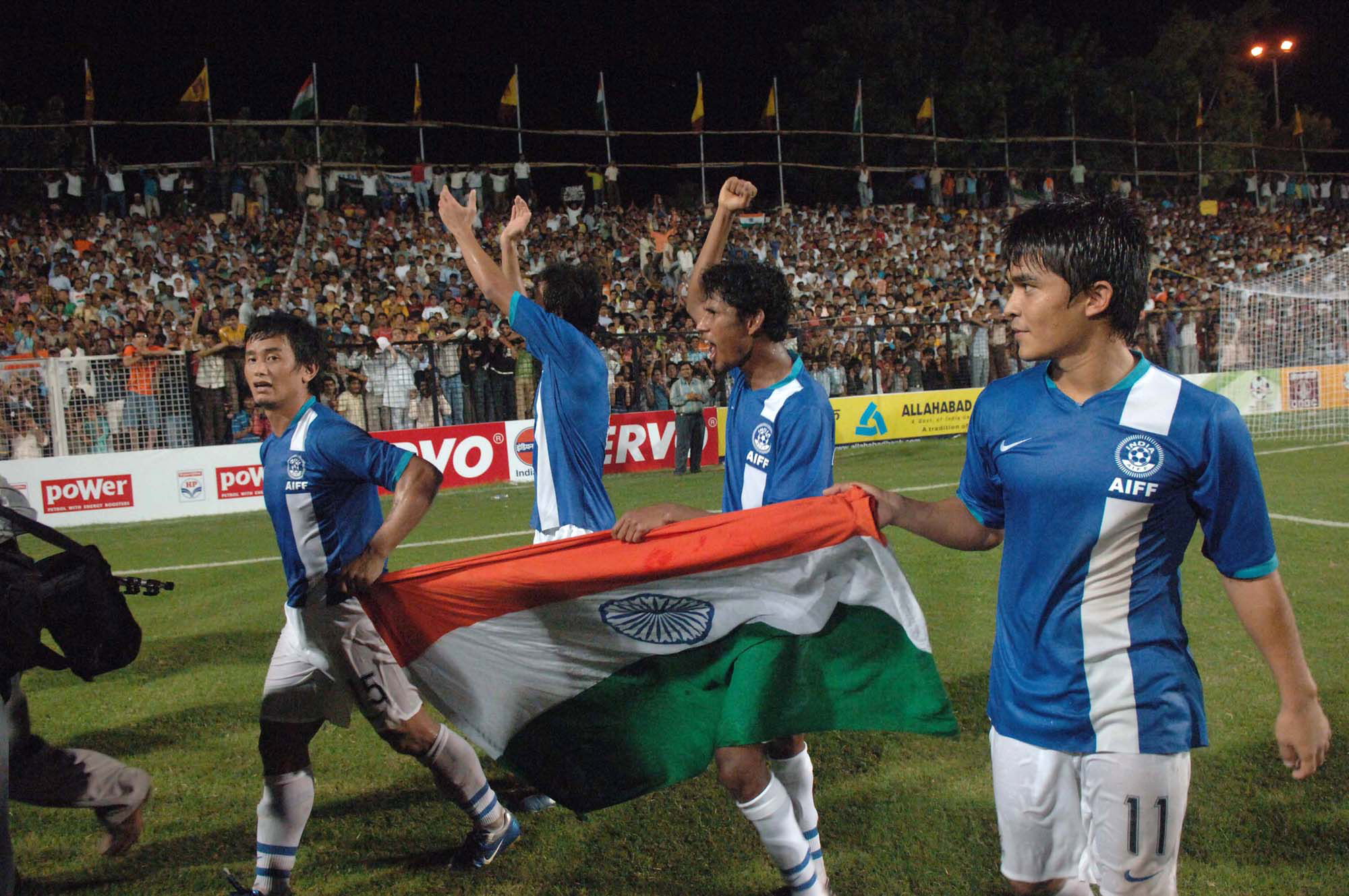
India captain Bhutia (left) celebrating along with other players after winning the Nehru Cup in 2007

He scored twice in a 2–1 victory in the 2008 AFC Challenge Cup against Turkmenistan to reach the semi-finals. The Sikkimese Sniper scored a goal in the final against Tajikistan, during which India won 4–1 thanks to a Sunil Chhetri hat-trick; the victory also allowed them to automatically qualify for the 2011 AFC Asian Cup. He was also selected as the most valuable player of the tournament, finishing with three goals.

The 2009 Nehru Cup was significant for Bhutia, as he earned his 100th cap for India in a 2–1 win over Kyrgyzstan, becoming the first Indian player to reach this milestone. He also scored the first goal in this match to help the team recover from their opening day defeat to Lebanon. In the match against Sri Lanka, Bhutia again scored an opening goal which helped India to win 3–1 and solidified their chances of reaching the final. He was adjudged as the "man of the match" for his performance. Bhutia missed the final match of the round-robin, as India were already guaranteed a spot in the deciding match. He was also adjudged as "Player of the Tournament" for his stellar performances in all of the matches, including the decider where they beat Syria in a penalty shootout.

At the 2011 AFC Asian Cup in Qatar, Bhutia was injured for their first two games against Australia and Bahrain, but he came on as a second-half substitute against South Korea, but failed to save India, losing 4–1 as they were eliminated. Shortly after the Asian Cup, he announced his retirement for India on 24 August 2011 with a record of 40 goals in 104 appearances.

== Farewell match ==
10 January 2012
19:00 IST

India	0–4	(Germany) Bayern Munich
	Report	Mario Gómez 14'; Thomas Müller 29', 37'; Bastian Schweinsteiger 43'

Jawaharlal Nehru Stadium, New Delhi
Attendance: 30,000

== Managerial career ==
On 13 November 2012, Bhutia was named the interim manager of United Sikkim to replace Belgian Philippe De Ridder, after the club's heavy 1–10 defeat in an I-League match against Prayag United on 10 November 2012 at the Salt Lake Stadium. In January 2018, leading up to the Santosh Trophy, he was appointed the manager of Sikkim.

== Other careers ==
=== Entertainment ===
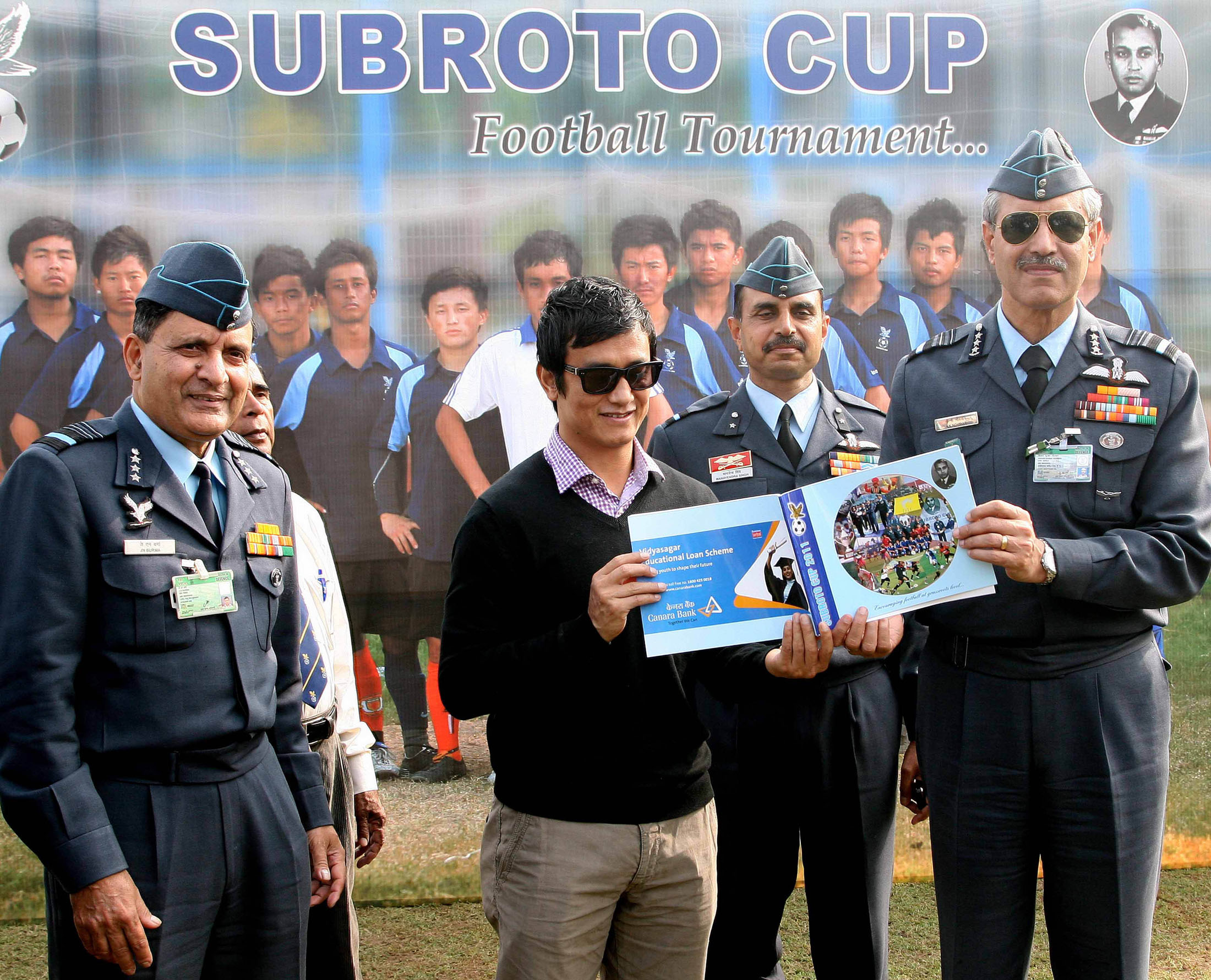
Bhutia with then Vice Chief of Air Staff, Air Marshal K. K. Nohwar at the release of souvenir of 52nd edition of the Subroto Cup Football Tournament on 25 November 2011.

==== Jhalak Dikhlaa Jaa ====
In 2009, partnering with choreographer Sonia Jaffer, he won the third season of Jhalak Dikhhla Jaa, the Indian version of the international series Dancing with the Stars. Bhutia earned Rs. 4 million for winning the competition, beating Karan Singh Grover and Gauahar Khan in the final. Bhutia donated half of the prize money to charity and the other half was shared with his choreographer; he also said some money would go towards areas hit by Cyclone Aila. It was reported that an "SMS Voting Frenzy" allowed him to win after many organisations in Sikkim conducted mass voting events (this involved participants buying mobile cash cards so they could vote via SMS) to increase Bhutia's chance of winning the trophy. This performance put Bhutia's relationship with his club Mohun Bagan in jeopardy, as he missed a friendly, as well as practice sessions, due to his participation in the reality show.

=== Politics ===
In 2014, Bhutia joined the Trinamool Congress and unsuccessfully contested the 2014 Indian general election from Darjeeling constituency. In 2021 West Bengal Legislative Assembly election he supported Left Front in favor of veteran Communist Party of India (Marxist) leader Ashok Bhattacharya.

=== Other ===
Bhutia comes from a Buddhist background, although he is, by conviction, not religious, considering himself an atheist. The name "Bhaichung" literally means "little brother". He married his longtime girlfriend Madhuri Tipnis, a hotel professional, on 30 December 2004 in his native village of Tinkitam in South Sikkim. They filed for divorce by mutual consent in Bandra court on in February 2015. His fictional hero is Howard Roark, a character from Ayn Rand's novel The Fountainhead, and he has a tattoo of a footballer on his arm. The Sikkimese government has built a stadium, the Bhaichung Stadium in Namchi, the district headquarters, in honour of Bhutia. He is one of the most popular figures in the state and is considered as a role model to many Sikkimese as well to people from other states of India. On 23 January 2008, Bhutia was nominated for the Padma Shri, the fourth highest civilian award, for his contribution to Indian football. Three days later on 26 January, India's Republic Day, he was chosen for the Padma Shri along with national swimming champion Bula Choudhury.

He played in the Goal 4 Africa match held in the Allianz Arena, Munich, on 12 July 2008, for the Edu team, led by Clarence Seedorf, and scored twice. In 2009, Bhutia started a foundation called the "Indian Sports Foundation" to help footballers overcome serious injuries. He is also the president of the Football Players' Association of India (FPAI), an organisation that promises "fair treatment" of Indian footballers by dealing with financial aspects such as pension plans. He formed FPAI after seeing the Professional Footballers' Association in England.

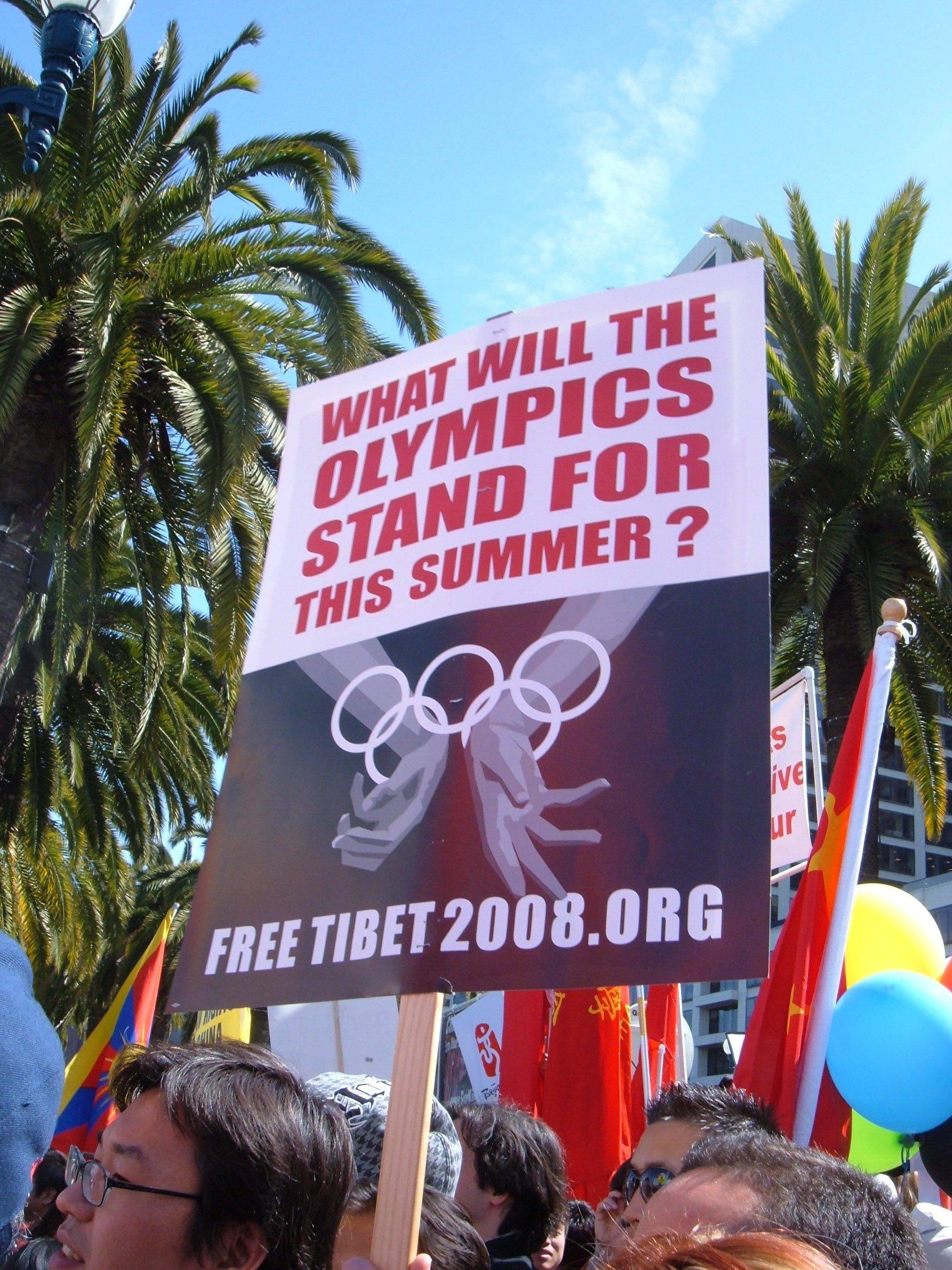
Bhutia is a supporter of the Tibetan independence movement.

He signed an endorsement deal with Adidas India Marketing Pvt. Ltd in November 2003. Currently he is endorsing Nike India. After completing the deal to become the brand's ambassador for India, Bhutia said "I am confident that Nike will help elevate the sport in the country."

In 2008, Bhutia was solicited to run with the Olympic torch in India, but he refused to carry the torch to show support for the Tibetan independence movement. "I sympathise with the Tibetan cause. I'm against violence but I thought I should stand by the Tibetan people in their fight," Bhutia said. He was the first Indian sportsman to refuse to carry the Olympic torch. His actions have won him little praise from his colleagues in India however, who criticised him for mixing sports with politics.

In 2011, Bhutia was caught in the Sikkim earthquake. Although he was not injured, his United Sikkim offices were completely destroyed. In the aftermath, he joined with several Bollywood actors like Neha Dhupia and Rahul Bose to raise money for earthquake victims.

In 2018, after the break up with All India Trinamool Congress, he established a new party on 31 May. The name of the party is "Hamro Sikkim Party". He also served as brand ambassador of sport equipments manufacturer Vector X. In June 2026, Bhutia joined the official broadcasting expert panel for ZEE5 and Unite8 Sports to provide live studio analysis and commentary for the 2026 FIFA World Cup broadcast in India.

=== Bhaichung Bhutia Football Schools ===
On 28 October 2010, he started Bhaichung Bhutia Football Schools in Delhi in partnership with Carlos Queiroz. BBFS also entered into partnership with United Sikkim and Garhwal FC for opening up coaching camps with grassroot framework in hilly areas of Sikkim and West Bengal in 2013.

=== Sportstar jury ===
Bhutia was elected as member of the "Sportstar Aces 2023" jury.

== Personal life ==
Bhutia's parents were farmers. He has two elder brothers and one elder sister. Bhutia was married to Madhuri Tipnis since 2004. They filed their divorce in 2015. He is a father to three children, two girls and one boy.

== Career statistics ==
National team FIFA 'A' statistics
National team	Year	Apps	Goals
India	1995	7	2
India	1996	5	1
India	1997	8	4
India	1998	6	0
India	1999	4	4
India	2000	1	0
India	2001	5	2
India	2002	2	0
India	2003	1	0
India	2004	5	0
India	2005	5	2
India	2006	7	1
India	2007	7	3
India	2008	12	5
India	2009	5	3
India	2010	2	0
India	2011	1	0
Total		83	27

Key
Indicates India national football team won the match
Indicates the match ended in draw
Indicates India national football team lost the match

List of international goals scored by Bhaichung Bhutia Scores and results list India's goal tally first
No.	Date	Venue	Opponent	Score	Result	Competition
1	29 March 1995	Sugathadasa Stadium, Colombo	Sri Lanka	1–0	2–2	1995 SAFF Championship
2	29 March 1995	Sugathadasa Stadium, Colombo	Sri Lanka	2–0	2–2	1995 SAFF Championship
3	6 March 1996	Bukit Jalil National Stadium, Kuala Lumpur	Malaysia	2–5	2–5	1996 Asian Cup qualifier
4	11 April 1997	Jawaharlal Nehru Stadium, Kochi	China	1–2	1–2	1997 Nehru Cup
5	7 September 1997	Dasharath Rangasala, Kathmandu	Bangladesh	3–0	3–0	1997 SAFF Championship
6	9 September 1997	Dasharath Rangasala, Kathmandu	Maldives	1–0	2–2	1997 SAFF Championship
7	13 September 1997	Dasharath Rangasala, Kathmandu	Maldives	2–0	5–1	1997 SAFF Championship
8	26 April 1999	Jawaharlal Nehru Stadium, Margao	Pakistan	1–0	2–0	1999 SAFF Championship
9	26 April 1999	Jawaharlal Nehru Stadium, Margao	Pakistan	2–0	2–0	1999 SAFF Championship
10	29 April 1999	Jawaharlal Nehru Stadium, Margao	Maldives	1–0	2–1	1999 SAFF Championship
11	1 May 1999	Jawaharlal Nehru Stadium, Margao	Bangladesh	2–0	2–0	1999 SAFF Championship
12	15 April 2001	Bangalore Football Stadium, Bengaluru	Yemen	1–1	1–1	2002 World Cup qualifier
13	20 May 2001	Bangalore Football Stadium, Bengaluru	Brunei	3–0	5–0	2002 World Cup qualifier
14	10 December 2005	Peoples Football Stadium, Karachi	Bhutan	1–0	3–0	2005 SAFF Championship
15	17 December 2005	Peoples Football Stadium, Karachi	Bangladesh	2–0	2–0	2005 SAFF Championship
16	18 February 2006	Hong Kong Stadium, Wan Chai	Hong Kong	2–2	2–2	Friendly
17	17 August 2007	Ambedkar Stadium, New Delhi	Cambodia	2–0	6–0	2007 Nehru Cup
18	20 August 2007	Ambedkar Stadium, New Delhi	Bangladesh	1–0	1–0	2007 Nehru Cup
19	26 August 2007	Ambedkar Stadium, New Delhi	Kyrgyzstan	1–0	3–0	2007 Nehru Cup
20	3 June 2008	National Football Stadium, Malé	Nepal	2–0	4–0	2008 SAFF Championship
21	22 July 2008	Lal Bahadur Shastri Stadium, Hyderabad	Malaysia	1–0	1–1	Friendly
22	3 August 2008	G. M. C. Balayogi Athletic Stadium, Hyderabad	Turkmenistan	1–0	2–1	2008 AFC Challenge Cup
23	3 August 2008	G. M. C. Balayogi Athletic Stadium, Hyderabad	Turkmenistan	2–0	2–1	2008 AFC Challenge Cup
24	13 August 2008	Ambedkar Stadium, New Delhi	Tajikistan	2–0	4–1	2008 AFC Challenge Cup
25	14 January 2009	Hong Kong Stadium, Wan Chai	Hong Kong	1–1	1–2	Friendly
26	23 August 2009	Ambedkar Stadium, New Delhi	Kyrgyzstan	1–0	2–1	2009 Nehru Cup
27	26 August 2009	Ambedkar Stadium, New Delhi	Sri Lanka	1–0	3–1	2009 Nehru Cup

== Honours ==
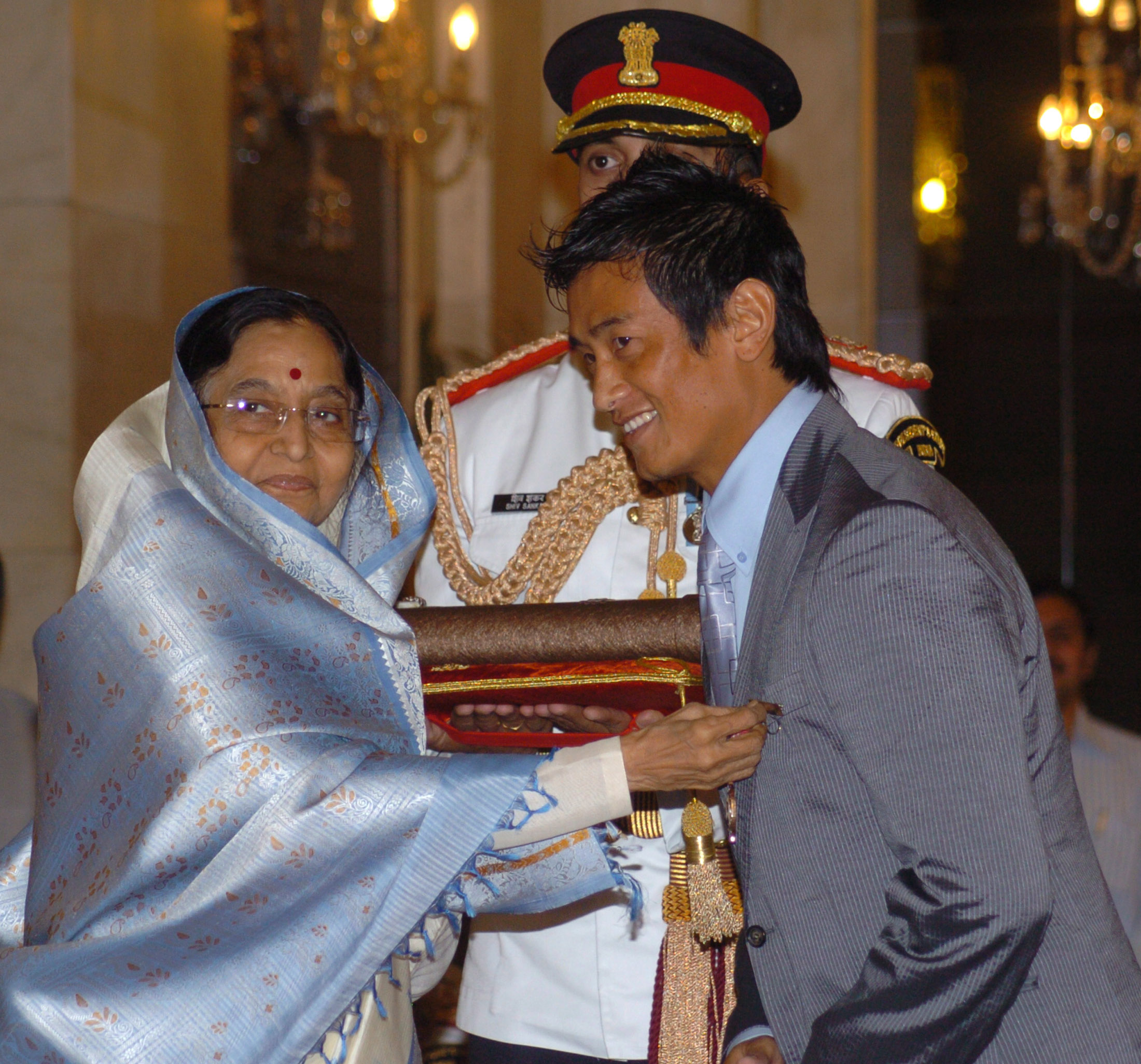
Then President, Pratibha Patil, presenting the Padma Shri to Bhutia during Civil Investiture-II Ceremony, at the Rashtrapati Bhavan in 2008.

East Bengal

- ASEAN Club Championship: 2003
- National Football League: 2003–04
- Federation Cup: 2009–10, 2010
- Indian Super Cup: 2011
- Calcutta Football League: 1993, 1995, 1998, 1999, 2003, 2004, 2006, 2010, 2011
- IFA Shield: 1994, 1995, 1997
- Wai Wai Cup: 1993
- San Miguel International Cup: 2004

Mohun Bagan

- Calcutta Football League: 2007, 2008, 2009
- IFA Shield: 2003
- Federation Cup: 2006, 2008

Bengal

- Santosh Trophy: 1995, 1998–99

India

- AFC Challenge Cup: 2008
- SAFF Championship: 1997, 1999, 2005; runner-up: 1995, 2008
- Nehru Cup: 2007, 2009
- South Asian Games gold medal: 1995
- Afro-Asian Games silver medal: 2003

India U23

- LG Cup: 2002

Individual

- AIFF Player of the Year: 1995, 2008
- Arjuna Award: 1998
- Padma Shri: 2008
- AFC Challenge Cup Most Valuable Player: 2008
- Banga Bhushan: 2014
- Asian Football Hall of Fame: 2014
- IFFHS 48 Football Legend Players: 2016
- ASEAN Club Championship Top Scorer: 2003

== Electoral records ==
West Bengal Legislative Assembly election

Year	Constituency	Political Party	Result	Position	Votes	% Votes	% Margin	Deposit	Source
2016	Siliguri	AITC	Lost	2nd/11	63,982	38.01	-8.35	refunded	

Sikkim Legislative Assembly election

Year	Constituency	Political Party	Result	Position	Votes	% Votes	% Margin	Deposit	Source
2019	Tumen-Lingi	HSP	Lost	3rd/3	234	1.76	-48.13	forfeited	
2019	Gangtok	HSP	Lost	5th/6	70	0.94	-50.74	forfeited	
2019 (by-election)	Gangtok	HSP	Lost	4th/6	579	9.44	-31.44	forfeited	

Indian general election

Year	Constituency	Political Party	Result	Position	Votes	% Votes	% Margin	Deposit	Source
2014	Darjeeling	AITC	Lost	2nd/13	2,91,018	25.47	-17.26	refunded	

== See also ==
- AIFF Player of the Year
- Asian Football Hall of Fame inductees
- List of India national football team captains
- Bhaichung Stadium
- Politics and sports
- List of Indian football players in foreign leagues
