= Tsering Dhundup =

Indian-Tibetan footballer and political activist

Personal information
- Date of birth: 21 February 1982 (age 44)
- Place of birth: Mundgod, India

International career
Years	Team	Apps	(Gls)
2007–	Tibet		

Tsering Dhundup (Tibetan: ཚེ་རིང་དོན་གྲུབ་, Wylie: tshe ring don grub; born 21 February 1982) is a Tibetan football player and political activist from Dehradun. The midfielder plays for the Tibet national football team since 2007. Dhundup is top scorer since the 6-0 victory of Tibet against Delhi XI, on 4 August 2007, since the foundation of the Tibetan team in 1999.

Dhundup is spokesperson of the Tibetan Youth Congress. In February 2008, Dhundup was arrested at the UN funded Tibetan Reception Centre in Kathmandu. He was held in a cell by the Nepalese immigration department, before being handed back to the Chinese authorities, at the Tibet-Nepal border at Tatopani. Exiled Tibetans and supporters have demanded his release.

== See also ==
- Tibet national football team
- Tibetan culture
