= Sikkim Police =

Police department of Sikkim, India

- Sikkim Police logo
- Abbreviation: S.P.
- Motto: Protect and Serve

Agency overview
- Formed: 27 November 1897; 128 years ago
- Employees: 3500
- Volunteers: 538
- Legal personality: Government Owned

Jurisdictional structure
- Operations jurisdiction: Sikkim, IN
- Map of Sikkim Police's jurisdiction
- Population: 6,10,000
- Governing body: Government of Sikkim
- General nature: Civilian police

Operational structure
- Headquarters: NH 10, Gangtok-737101
- Elected Minister responsible: Prem Singh Tamang, [Chief Minister, Home Department, Finance Department, Excise Department, Information & Public Relations Department, Information Technology Department, Land Revenue & Disaster Management Department, Planning & Development Department, Power Department, Skill Development Department, Transport Department]
- Agency executive: Shri Akshay Sachdeva, IPS Batch 1991, Director General of Police
- Parent agency: Home Department, Govt. of Sikkim
- Units: CID, Communication & Computer, Training, Check post l, Home Guard & Civil Defence, Fire, Special Branch, Law & Order, Traffic Branch, Planning & Modernization
- Para Militarys: Sikkim Armed Police, I.R.B 1st Battalion, I.R.B 2nd Battalion, I.R.B 3rd Battalion, State Reserve Lines

Facilities
- Police Stations: 29
- State Prisons: 1
- Department vehicles: Patrol car, ERSS Vehicle, BDDS Vehicle, Personnel Carrier Heavy And light Vehicles, Prison Transport Vehicle Heavy and Light, Mobile Checking Vehicle, K9 Support Vehicle, Officers Duty Vehicle, Station Vehicle, Tow/Recovery Vehicle, Escort Vehicle, Pilot Convoy Lead Vehicle, Patrol Bikes, Mobile Commandant Vehicle, Traffic Patrol
- K9 UNITs: Labrador

Website
- police.sikkim.gov.in

Sikkim Police is the law enforcement agency of the government of Sikkim in India. It holds responsibilities to patrol the streets and maintain law and order within the state of Sikkim. It is headquartered in the state capital Gangtok. The Sikkim Police is headed by a Director General of Police and fall under the purview of the state Home Department.

== History ==
The Sikkim Police was formed on November 27, 1897, with a small force consisting of one Head Constable and five Constables to address rising crime and security issues in the region. John Claude White, Sikkim's first political officer, initiated its establishment due to population growth and territorial disputes with Tibet. Over the years, the Sikkim Police evolved, expanding its roles and integrating with modern policing practices, especially after Sikkim's merger with India in 1975.
