= Sikkim Football League =

Indian regional association football league in Sikkim

SFA "A" Division S-League
- Organising body: Sikkim Football Association
- Founded: 2012; 14 years ago (as Sikkim Premier Division League)
- Country: India
- Number of clubs: 8
- Level on pyramid: 5
- Promotion to: I-League 3
- Relegation to: SFA "B" Division
- Domestic cup(s): Sikkim Gold Cup; Independence Cup; All India Chief Minister Gold Cup
- Current champions: Sikkim Police (1st title)
- Most championships: United Sikkim (3 titles)
- Broadcaster: SFA (YouTube)
- Current: 2026–27

The Sikkim Football League is a group of state-level football leagues in the Indian state of Sikkim, organised by the Sikkim Football Association. It was founded in 2012 as the Sikkim Premier Division League. The SFA "A" Division S-League is the premier state-level football league in Sikkim. United Sikkim is the most successful team with three league titles.

== History ==
The current top-tier league in Sikkim was started in 2011 with 8 teams. The league was suspended in 2019, following a dispute between the Football Players Association of Sikkim (FCAS) and the SFA. The state league eventually resumed in 2023. Matches for the 2023 season were broadcast on Pavilion TV.

== Venues ==
The most matches for the Sikkim Premier Division League are held at Paljor Stadium. Matches for the Sikkim B Division League are mostly held at Bhaichung Stadium, Namchi, for Namchi Zone, and Paljor Stadium for Gangtok Zone.

== Champions ==
Season	Champions	Runners-up	Ref
2012	Sinolchu FC		
2013	United Sikkim		
2014	Gangtok Himalayan		
2015	State Sports Academy		
2016	Sikkim Aakraman	Gangtok Himalayan	
2017	United Sikkim	Sikkim Aakraman	
2018	United Sikkim	Sikkim Aakraman	
2019	League suspended due to FCAS and SFA dispute		
2023	Sikkim Police	Sikkim Himalayan	
2024	Sikkim Police	Sikkim Brotherhood FC	
2026–27			

== SFA "B" Division League ==
The current second-tier league has teams from Gangtok and Namchi. The league operates on a round robin basis, with top 2 teams from each zone progressing to the playoff. Both of the finalists are promoted.

Gangtok Zone
Team
Sikkim Brotherhood FC
Sang Mustang FC
Sikkim Boys FC
Northerners FC, Mangan
Dzongri FC
Pakyong United SC

Namchi Zone
Team
Howlers FC, Singtam
Red Panda FC
Gyalsing Sporting Club
Sanju Football Academy
Sinolchu FC
Kaluk Sporting Club

== See also ==
- Sikkim Women's Football League
