= Sikkim Premier League =

Association football league in Sikkim, India

- Organising body: Football Development Private Limited; Sikkim Football Association
- Founded: 2023; 3 years ago
- Country: India
- Number of clubs: 8
- Current champions: Siniolchu FC (1st title) (2026)
- Most championships: Sikkim Aakraman (2 titles)
- Broadcasters: Hamro Varta Television; Filmmingo Sports Network (online streaming)

The Sikkim Premier League is a state-level men's franchise football league in Sikkim, India. The first season was started in 2023, organised by the Football Development Private Limited and the Sikkim Football Association.

== History ==
In order to revive competitive football in the state, a new franchise league was developed by the former regional footballers under the banner of Football Development Private Limited (FDPL). The league is sponsored by the Teesta Urja Limited and the Government of Sikkim. The league includes teams from different districts of Sikkim in order to provide a pan-state and more competitive structure.

== Stadiums ==
The stadiums that are used for the Sikkim Premier League are Paljor Stadium in Gangtok and Bhaichung Stadium in Namchi.

== Teams ==
Locations of the Sikkim Premier League teams

Team	Location
Red Panda FC	Namchi
Siniolchu FC	Namchi
Thunderbolt North United	Mangan
Yangthang United Geyzing	Yangthang, Gyalshing
Singling SC	Singling
Sikkim Dragons FC	Gangtok
Black Eagles SC	Gangtok
Gangtok Himalayan	Gangtok

== Champions ==
Season	Champions	Runners-up	Ref
2023	Sikkim Aakraman	Singling SC	
2024	Singling SC	Thunderbolt North United	
2025	Sikkim Aakraman	Singling SC	
2026	Siniolchu FC	Singling SC	
