= Sikkim Aakraman SC =

Association football club in Gangtok, India

Sikkim Aakraman
- Full name: Sikkim Aakraman Sporting Club
- Nickname: The Orange Brigade
- Short name: SAFC
- Founded: 2010; 16 years ago
- Ground: Paljor Stadium
- Capacity: 30,000
- Head coach: Ashish Chettri
- League: SFA "A" Division S-League
Home colours	Away colours	Third colours

Sikkim Aakraman Sporting Club is an Indian professional football club based in Gangtok, Sikkim. The club currently competes in the SFA "A" Division S-League, the top local division, and formerly in the Sikkim Premier League, the franchise league in Sikkim. It is part of the same-named multi-sports club. Founded in 2010, The club won the inaugural edition of the Sikkim Premier League in 2023.

== History ==
Sikkim Aakraman qualified for the Sikkim Premier Division League in 2016 and lifted the champion's trophy in same year. It finished as runners-up in 2017 and 2018. The club has also played semi-finals of the prestigious All India Governor's Gold Cup in 2016 and 2017, and was three-time finalist of the Independence Cup Football Tournament.

== Honours ==
=== League ===
- Sikkim Premier Division League
  - Champions (1): 2016
  - Runners-up (2): 2017, 2018
- Sikkim Premier League
  - Champions (1): 2023

=== Cup ===
- Sikkim Independence Day Cup
  - Runners-up (1): 2019
- Sikkim Gold Cup
  - Runners-up (1): 2026

=== Futsal ===
- Chandmari Futsal Tournament
  - Champions (1): 2020
