= Sikkim Football Association =

State governing body of Football in Sikkim

- Sport: Football
- Jurisdiction: Sikkim
- Membership: 6 district association
- Abbreviation: SFA
- Founded: 1976; 50 years ago
- Affiliation: All India Football Federation (AIFF)
- Headquarters: Paljor Stadium, Gangtok
- President: Menla Ethenpa
- Secretary: Phurba Sherpa

Official website
- sikkimfootball.in

The Sikkim Football Association (SFA) is one of the 36 Indian state football associations that are affiliated with the All India Football Federation (AIFF), based out of Gangtok, Sikkim. It sends state teams for Santosh Trophy and Rajmata Jijabai Trophy.

== History ==
The Sikkim Football Association was formed in the year 1976, while previously it was known as the Gangtok Football and Sporting Association. Sikkim football dates back with first local team, Kumar Sporting Club.

The association started Sikkim Gold Cup in 1979 with the help of the Sikkim government.

As interest in football in Sikkim went down due to the lack of organizing, former India football team captain Baichung Bhutia, who was born in Sikkim, founded the club United Sikkim. It became the main player source for Sikkim football team.

== State teams ==
=== Men ===
- Sikkim football team
- Sikkim under-20 football team
- Sikkim under-17 football team

=== Women ===
- Sikkim women's football team
- Sikkim women's under-20 football team
- Sikkim women's under-17 football team

== Affiliated district associations ==
All 6 district of Sikkim are affiliated with the Sikkim Football Association.

No.	Association	District	President
1	Gangtok District Football Association	Gangtok	
2	Mangan District Football Association	Mangan	
3	Pakyong District Football Association	Pakyong	
4	Soreng District Football Association	Soreng	
5	Namchi District Football Association	Namchi	
6	Gyalshing District Football Association	Gyalshing	

== Senior competitions ==
=== Club level ===
==== Men's ====
- SFA "A" Division S-League
- SFA "B" Division
- SFA "C" Division
- Sikkim Premier League (franchise)
- Sikkim Gold Cup
- Chogyal Sir Tashi Namgyal Memorial Independence Cup
- All India Chief Minister's Gold Cup

==== Women's ====
- Sikkim Women's Football League

== Sikkim Football League pyramid ==
Tier	Division	Promotion & relegation
1 _{(Level 5 on Indian football pyramid)}	SFA "A" Division S-League	8 teams, bottom relegated to "B"-Division
2 _{(Level 6 on Indian football pyramid)}	SFA "B" Division	top 2 teams promoted to "A" Division, bottom 2 relegated to "C"-Division
3 _{(Level 7 on Indian football pyramid)}	SFA "C" Division	top 2 teams promoted to "B" Division

== See also ==
- Football in India
- North East Premier League (India)
- Sikkim Premier League
- Indian Football League 3
