= Paljor Stadium =

Association football stadium in Sikkim, India

Coordinates: 27°20′03″N 88°36′43″E

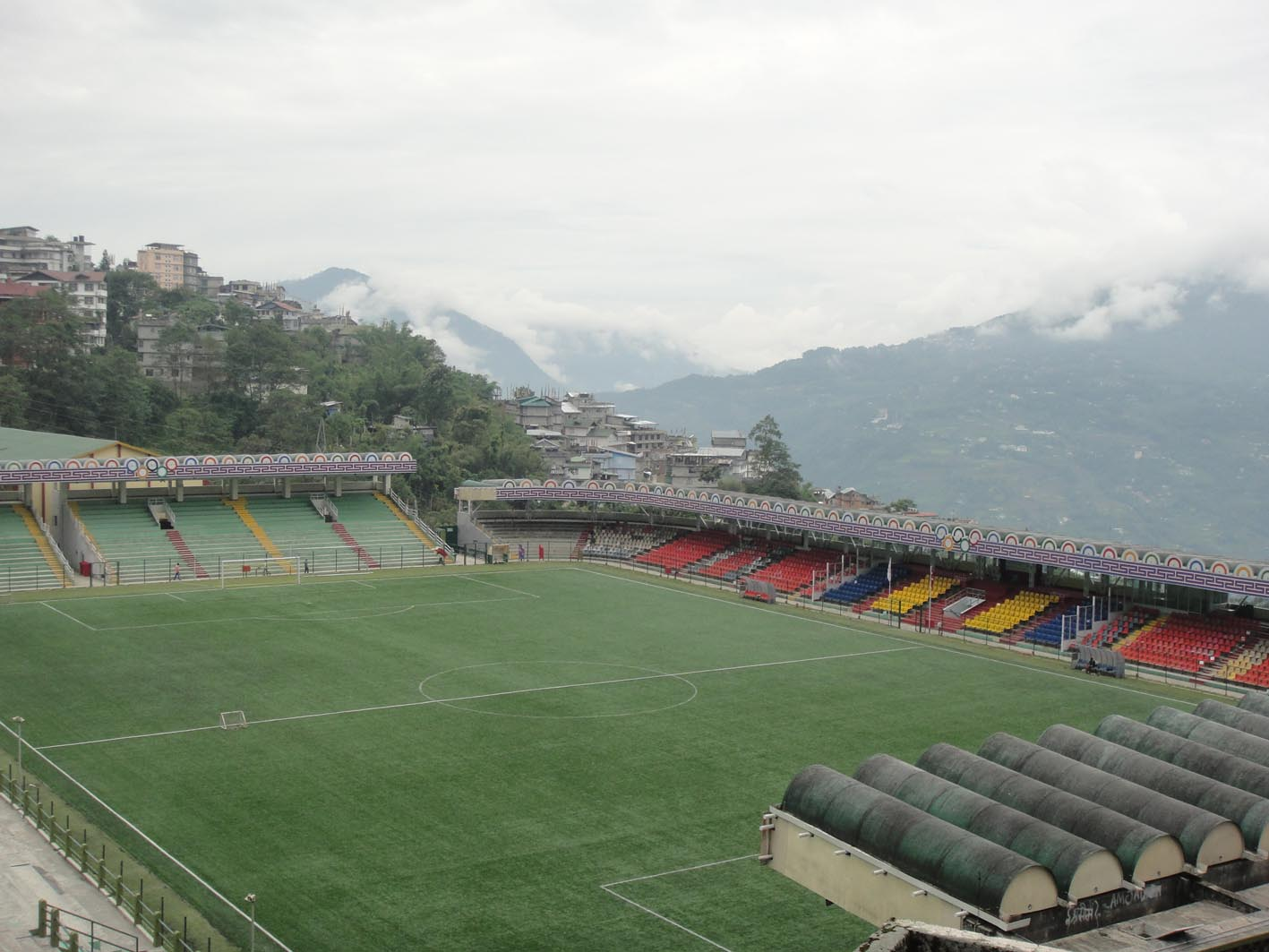
- View of the stadium
- Interactive map of Paljor Stadium
- Location: Gangtok, Sikkim
- Owner: Sikkim Football Association
- Capacity: 30,000
- Surface: Artificial turf
- Field size: 104 m × 65 m (114 yd × 71 yd)

Construction
- Groundbreaking: 1939
- Opened: 1943
- Renovated: 2022
- Expanded: April 2001– September 2005

Tenants
- SFA A-Division S-League; Sikkim Premier League; Sikkim B Division; Sikkim C Division; Sikkim Gold Cup; Independence Cup; Sikkim Women's Super League; Sikkim football team Sikkim women's football team

Paljor Stadium is a football stadium located in Gangtok, Sikkim, India. It can host 30,000 spectators. Besides earlier hosting the I-League and the I-League 2, the stadium also hosts matches of various local divisions and tournaments.

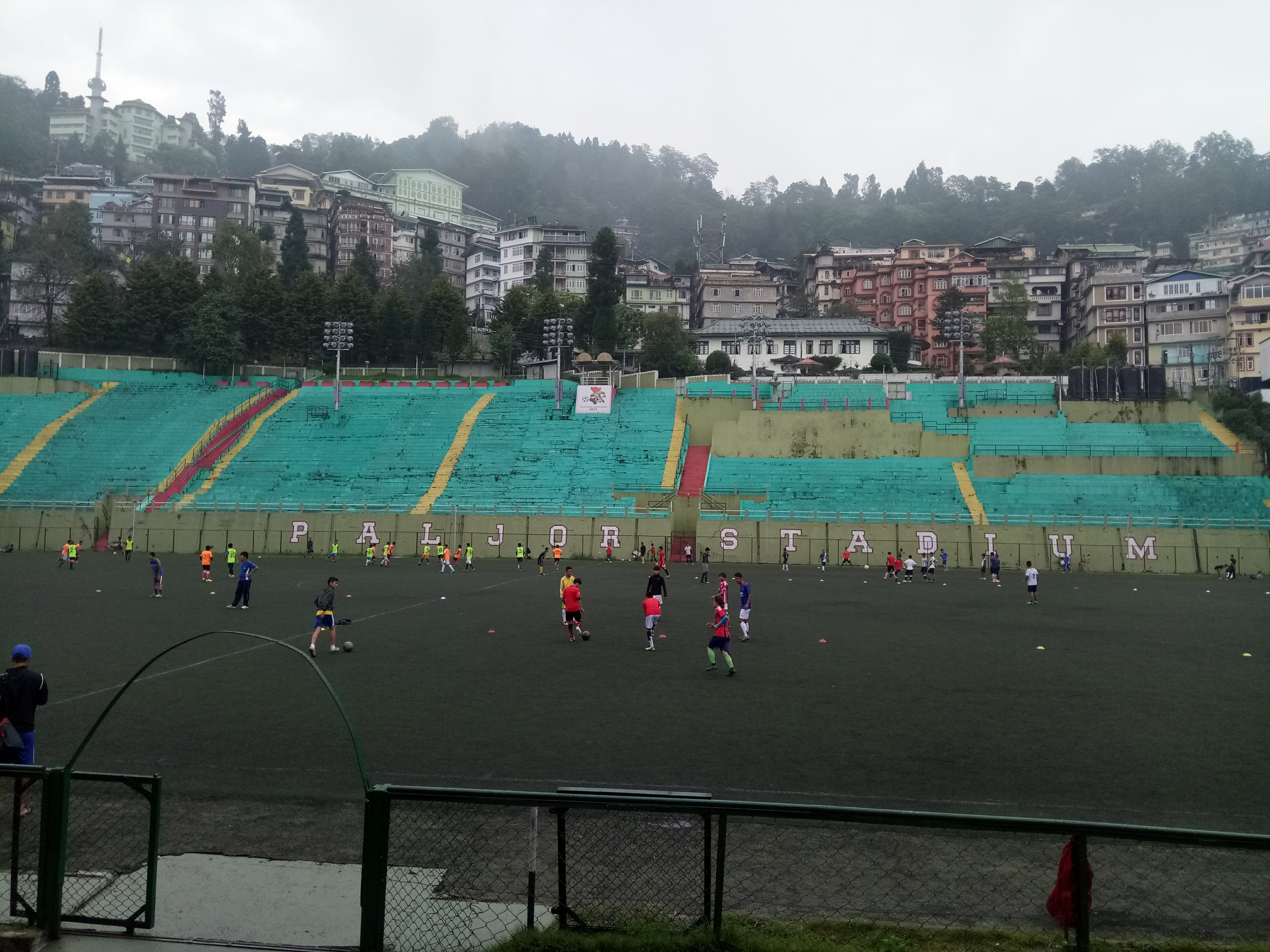
Players in training at Paljor Stadium, Gangtok

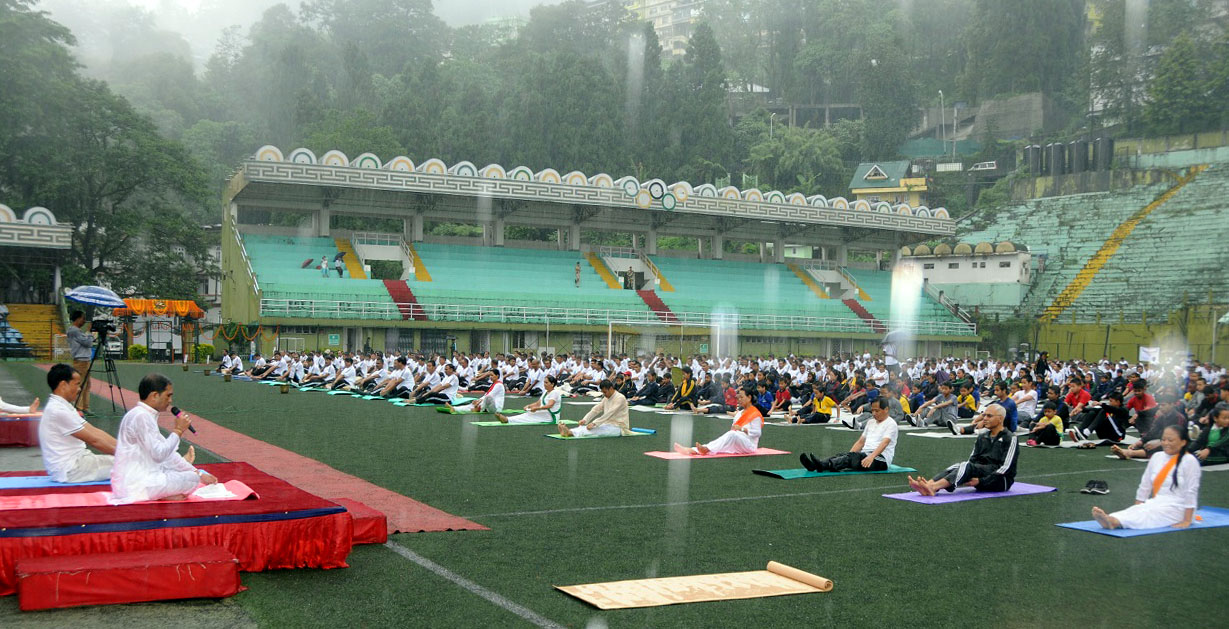
The stadium during yoga programme

== History ==
=== Foundation ===
Chogyal nicknamed the stadium around 1943 because Britishers and a few members of the aristocratic family of Sikkim played at the Polo Ground. The old timers recall this flat piece of land being used by the Tibetan traders to station their herds of sheep en route to Sikkim and India. Around 1939 one of the political officers, Sir Basil Gould had sanctioned Rs.3000 (approx $75.2634) to the forest department and ordered that the grass demonstration farm be set up there. The whole task was completed in April 1941. Later Paljor Stadium proved to be a major venue of all public meetings, including those of Prime ministers and religious leaders.

=== Renovation ===
It was on 24 July 1998 that a High power state committee constituted by the government took a decision to upgrade and renovate the existing Paljor Stadium. The project of redesigning and modernizing cost was around ₹ 30 Crores, out of which ₹ 15.36 Crores was from DONER contribution and remaining from the State coffer. The actual work started off in 2001. The modern look of the stadium was designed by M/S Architect Consultant Pvt. Ltd., Kolkata and its execution was assigned to Civil Engineers Enterprise Ltd, Kolkata. Initially the project was scheduled to be completed by March 2004, but owning the additional work the date was shifted to April 2005.

== Upgradation of the stadium ==
The work on the upgradation of Paljor Stadium was started in April 2001 and has been completed and the Stadium has been since handed over to the Department of Sports & Youth Affairs. The Stadium has an estimated sitting capacity of 25,000 spectators and the accumulated cost of construction stands at Rs. 30.70 crores. It has the following facilities:

- International size turf football field
- Electronic scoreboard
- Hostel accommodation
- Media centre
- VIP lounge
- Physiotherapy centre
- Indoor hall

The ultra-modern Paljor Stadium was inaugurated by Dr. A.P.J. Abdul Kalam, the President of India on 22 September 2005 in the presence of the Governor of Sikkim and Dr. Pawan Chamling, Chief Minister of Sikkim.

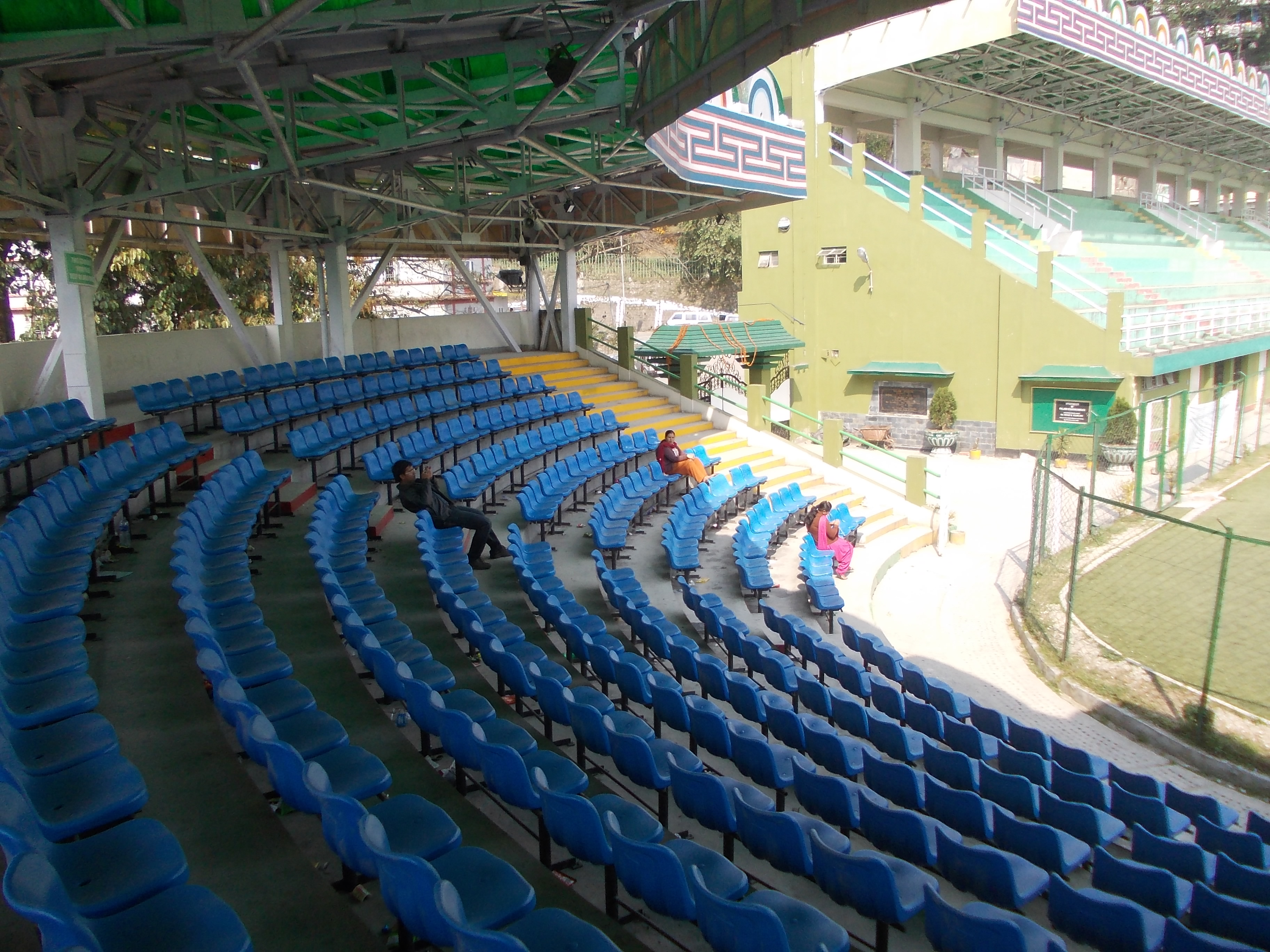
Seats in Paljor Stadium

== See also ==
- Bhaichung Stadium
