= List of ONGC FC seasons =

Oil and Natural Gas Corporation Football Club is an Indian I-League football club based in Mumbai, Maharashtra. The club is affiliated with the Oil and Natural Gas Corporation which runs the club. This means that ONGC Football Club is an institutional club.

== Key ==
- P = Played
- W = Games won
- D = Games drawn
- L = Games lost
- F = Goals for
- A = Goals against
- Pts = Points
- Pos = Final position
- IL = I-League
- IL 2 = I-League 2nd Division
- Group = Group stage

| 1st or W | Winners |
| 2nd or RU | Runners-up |
| ↑ | Promoted |
| ↓ | Relegated |
| ♦ | Top scorer in division |

== Seasons ==
Results of league and cup competitions by season
| Season | Division | P | W | D | L | F | A | Pts | Pos | Federation Cup | Indian Super Cup | Competition | Result | Name | Goals |
| Season | League | | | | | | | | | Federation Cup | Indian Super Cup | Asia | | Top goalscorer | |
|---|---|---|---|---|---|---|---|---|---|---|---|---|---|---|---|
| 2008 | IL 2 | 5 | 1 | 3 | 1 | 4 | 4 | 6 | 5th | — | — | — | — | (Nigeria) Chukwekere Henry | 2 |
| 2009 | IL 2 | 9 | 5 | 1 | 3 | 8 | 8 | 14 | 5th | — | — | — | — | (India) Tarif Ahmed | 4 |
| 2010 | IL 2 ↑ | 13 | 10 | 2 | 1 | 30 | 7 | 32 | 1st | — | — | — | — | (Nigeria) Badmus Babatunde | Unknown |
| 2010–11 | IL ↓ | 26 | 5 | 9 | 12 | 25 | 40 | 24 | 14th | Group | — | — | — | (Nigeria) Badmus Babatunde | 11 |
| 2012 | IL 2 ↑ | 12 | 6 | 4 | 2 | 20 | 9 | 22 | 2nd | Qualification | — | — | — | Unknown | |
| 2012–13 | IL ↓ | 26 | 7 | 10 | 9 | 30 | 40 | 31 | 9th | Group | — | — | — | (Liberia) Eric Brown | 7 |
