= Asif Kottayil =

Indian footballer (born 1985)

Personal information
- Full name: Asif Kottayil
- Date of birth: 24 May 1985 (age 41)
- Place of birth: Valiyaparamba, Kerala, India
- Height: 1.76 m (5 ft 9 in)
- Position: Central midfielder

Team information
- Current team: Forca Kochi FC
- Number: 10

Youth career
- 2005–2008: Payyanur College

Senior career*
| Years | Team | Apps | (Gls) |
| 2008–2010 | Malabar United | | |
| 2010–2011 | Prayag United | 1 | (0) |
| 2011–2012 | Chirag United Kerala | 19 | (1) |
| 2012–2014 | Prayag United | 45 | (2) |
| 2014 | Mumbai City | 3 | (0) |
| 2015 | → Bharat FC (loan) | 7 | (0) |
| 2015 | Mohun Bagan | | |
| 2016 | Mumbai FC | | |
| 2017 | Chennai City FC | | |
- * Club domestic league appearances and goals

Asif Kottayil (born 24 May 1985 in Trikaripur, Kasaragod) is an Indian professional footballer who plays as a central midfielder for Forca Kochi FC in the Super League Kerala.

== Career ==
=== Prayag United ===
After playing college football at Payyanur College, Asif was signed by Malabar United of the I-League 2nd Division for the 2008 season. After two seasons with Malabar, Asif was signed by Prayag United, where he made just the one appearance in one season.

=== Chirag United Kerala ===
After one season at Chirag United, Asif joined Chirag United Club Kerala. He only stayed at the club for one season however scoring once in nineteen appearances.

=== Back to Prayag United ===
On 11 May 2012 it was announced that Asif had re-signed for Prayag United for the 2012–13 I-League season. In first season he played 24 I-League matches and scored one goal.

== Career statistics ==
=== Club ===
As of 24 August 2015

| Club | Season | League | | Cup | | AFC | | Total | |
| Club | Season | Apps | Goals | Apps | Goals | Apps | Goals | Apps | Goals |
|---|---|---|---|---|---|---|---|---|---|
| Prayag United | 2010–11 | 1 | 0 | 0 | 0 | — | — | 1 | 0 |
| Chirag United Kerala | 2011–12 | 19 | 1 | 0 | 0 | — | — | 19 | 1 |
| Prayag United | 2012–13 | 24 | 1 | 1 | 0 | — | — | 25 | 1 |
| Prayag United | 2013–14 | 21 | 1 | 3 | 0 | — | — | 24 | 1 |
| Mumbai City | 2014 | 3 | 0 | — | — | — | — | 3 | 0 |
| Bharat FC (loan) | 2014–15 | 7 | 0 | — | — | — | — | 7 | 0 |
| Mohun Bagan | 2015–16 | 0 | 0 | 0 | 0 | 0 | 0 | 0 | 0 |
| Career total | | 75 | 3 | 4 | 0 | 0 | 0 | 79 | 3 |
