= 2011 I-League 2nd Division =

4th season of the I-League 2nd Division

I-League 2nd Division
- Season: 2010–11
- Champions: Shillong Lajong
- Promoted: Shillong Lajong; Sporting Goa
- Matches: 63
- Goals: 220 (3.49 per match)
- Top goalscorer: Stanley Cyprian (Aryans)
- Biggest home win: 8-0
- Biggest away win: 5-0
- Highest scoring: 7-2
- Longest unbeaten run: 6
- Longest winless run: 1
- Longest losing run: 4

The 2011 I-League 2nd Division was the fourth season of the second division of the I-League, the Indian professional football league. A total of 21 teams were divided into three groups and the two top teams from each group played in the final round where they were joined by Shillong Lajong and Sporting Goa.

== Schedules and groups ==
The Second Division League fixtures for the preliminary round were as follows. Group A matches were scheduled to be played from 27 March to 9 April, while Group B Matches would be held from 2 April to 18 April and Group C matches would be played from 31 March to 17 April.

=== Group A ===
==== Stadiums and locations ====
Club	City/state	Stadium	Capacity
Southern Samity	West Bengal	Unknown	Unknown
Simla Youngs	Delhi	Unknown	Unknown
Golden Threads	Kerala	Unknown	Unknown
Langsning	Meghalaya	J.N Complex Stadium	27,000
Gauhati Town	Assam	Indira Gandhi Athletic Stadium, Guwahati	30,000
United Sikkim	Sikkim	Paljor Stadium	15,000
North Imphal Sporting Association	Manipur	Thangmeiband Athletic Union Ground	10,000

Venue: Indira Gandhi Athletic Stadium, Assam (Guwahati)

==== Group table ====
Team	Pld	W	D	L	GF	GA	GD	Pts	
United Sikkim	6	4	1	1	15	7	8	13	2011 I-League 2nd Division final round
Southern Samity	6	4	1	1	10	5	5	13	2011 I-League 2nd Division final round
Langsning	6	3	1	2	11	7	4	10	
NISA	6	3	0	3	9	7	2	9	
Golden Threads	6	1	2	2	5	10	−5	5	
Simla Youngs	6	1	2	3	4	8	-4	5	
Gauhati Town	6	1	1	4	4	10	−6	4	

=== Group B ===
==== Stadiums and locations ====
Club	City/state	Stadium	Capacity
Denzong Boys	Sikkim	Unknown	Unknown
Josco	Kerala	Unknown	Unknown
Ar-Hima	Meghalaya	J.N Complex Stadium	27,000
Mohammedan Sporting	Kolkata	Salt Lake Stadium, Kolkata	120,000
Malabar United	Kochi	Jawaharlal Nehru Stadium, Kochi	50,000
SESA	Goa	Unknown	Unknown
Kenkre	Mumbai	Cooperage Ground	12,000

Venue: Jharkhand, Jamshedpur

==== Group table ====
Team	Pld	W	D	L	GF	GA	GD	Pts	
Mohammedan Sporting	6	4	2	0	11	4	+7	14	2011 I-League 2nd Division final round
Ar-Hima	6	3	1	2	14	8	+6	10	2011 I-League 2nd Division final round
Josco	6	3	1	2	12	10	2	10	
Kenkre	6	3	1	2	14	11	3	10	
Malabar United	6	1	4	1	7	4	3	7	
SESA	6	1	1	4	8	13	-5	4	
Denzong Boys	6	0	2	4	8	21	−13	2	

=== Group C ===
==== Stadiums and locations ====
Club	City/state	Stadium	Capacity
Chandni	Calicut	EMS Stadium	1,00,000
Techno Aryan	West Bengal	Unknown	Unknown
Vasco	Goa	Jawaharlal Nehru - Fatorda Stadium	27,300
Royal Wahingdoh	Meghalaya	Jawaharlal Nehru Stadium Polo, Shillong	30,000
Eagles	Kerala	Unknown	Unknown
PIFA	Maharashtra	Cooperage Ground	12,000
BEML	Bangalore	Unknown	Unknown

Venue: Tamil Nadu (Madurai)

==== Group table ====
Team	Pld	W	D	L	GF	GA	GD	Pts	
Royal Wahingdoh	6	6	0	0	17	7	+10	18	2011 I-League 2nd Division final round
Vasco	6	5	0	1	26	6	+20	15	2011 I-League 2nd Division final round
Techno Aryan	6	4	0	2	16	6	+10	12	
Eagles	6	2	1	3	10	13	-3	7	
PIFA	6	2	0	4	7	14	−7	7	
BEML	6	1	0	5	4	15	−11	3	
Chandni	6	0	1	5	2	20	−18	1	

== Final round ==
The final round of the 2011 I-League 2nd Division will take place between eight teams from the group stage in a single table format in which each team plays each other once

Team	Pld	W	D	L	GF	GA	GD	Pts	
Shillong Lajong	7	5	1	1	12	6	6	16	I-League 2011-12
Sporting Goa	7	4	2	1	10	6	4	14	I-League 2011-12
Vasco	7	4	1	2	13	8	5	13	
Ar-Hima	7	3	2	2	11	8	3	11	
United Sikkim	7	2	4	1	9	9	0	10	
Royal Wahingdoh	7	1	2	4	12	13	−1	5	
Mohammedan Sporting	7	1	1	5	4	9	−5	4	
Southern Samity	7	1	1	5	4	16	−12	4	

== Top scorers ==
Rank	Player	Club	Goals
1	(Nigeria) Stanley Cyprian	Techno Aryan	6
2	(India) Abraham Bobby Femi	Denzong Boys	4
	(Nigeria) Koko Sakibo	Vasco	4
	(Nigeria) Badmus Babatunde	Techno Aryan	4
	(India) Zico Zorensanga	Ar-Hima	4
6	(India) Sachin Gawas	Vasco	3
	(India) Joseph Pereira	Josco	3
	(India) L Nabachandra	North Imphal Sporting Association	3
	(India) Jackichand Singh	Royal Wahingdoh	3

Standings
