= List of Indian football transfers summer 2011 =

Here is the list of transfers announced. The biggest name to transfer this season is Odafe Onyeka Okolie who will be paid 1.5 crores (~$320k)

Date	Name	Moving From	Moving to	Fee
6 May 2011	(Nepal) Anil Gurung	Shillong Lajong FC	(Nepal) Manang Marshyangdi Club	Free
8 June 2011	(Nigeria) Chidi Edeh	Mohun Bagan AC	Salgaocar SC	Free
13 June 2011	(Nigeria) N. D. Opara	ONGC FC	Churchill Brothers SC	Free
13 June 2011	(Brazil) Roberto Mendes Silva	Dempo SC	Churchill Brothers SC	Free
13 June 2011	(India) Jerry Zirsanga	United Sports Club	Churchill Brothers SC	Free
13 June 2011	(India) Melwyn Rodrigues	United Sports Club	Churchill Brothers SC	Free
13 June 2011	(India) Sarang Singh	JCT FC	Churchill Brothers SC	Free
13 June 2011	(India) Jagpreet Singh	JCT FC	Churchill Brothers SC	Free
13 June 2011	(India) Basil Rego	Vasco SC	Churchill Brothers SC	Free
13 June 2011	(India) Xavier Vijay Kumar	HAL SC	Churchill Brothers SC	Free
13 June 2011	(India) Jai Kumar	HAL SC	Churchill Brothers SC	Free
18 June 2011	(India) Anil Kumar	Viva Kerala FC	Dempo SC	Free
18 June 2011	(Nigeria) Koko Sakibo	Vasco SC	Dempo SC	Free
18 June 2011	(India) Joy Ferrao	Vasco SC	Dempo SC	Free
18 June 2011	(India) Rowilson Rodrigues	Churchill Brothers SC	Dempo SC	Free
22 June 2011	(Gabon) Henry Antchouet	(Portugal) Moreirense F.C.	Churchill Brothers SC	Free
22 June 2011	(Liberia) Johnny Menyongar	United Sikkim FC	Shillong Lajong FC	Free
23 June 2011	(India) Baldeep Singh Junior	Salgaocar SC	Pune FC	Free
23 June 2011	(India) Anas Edathodika	Mumbai FC	Pune FC	Free
3 July 2011	(India) Karma Tsewang	Viva Kerala FC	Pune FC	Free
3 July 2011	(India) Shahin Lal Meloly	Viva Kerala FC	Pune FC	Free
3 July 2011	(India) Mehrajuddin Wadoo	Kingfisher East Bengal FC	Salgaocar SC	Free
7 July 2011	(India) Robert Lalthalma	Churchill Brothers SC	Kingfisher East Bengal FC	Free
7 July 2011	(India) Khemtang Paite	Churchill Brothers SC	Kingfisher East Bengal FC	Free
7 July 2011	(India) Charan Rai	Churchill Brothers SC	Kingfisher East Bengal FC	Free
7 July 2011	(India) Sunil Kumar	Pune FC	Kingfisher East Bengal FC	Free
7 July 2011	(India) Jeje Lalpekhlua	Indian Arrows	Pune FC	Loan Ended
7 July 2011	(India) Gurpreet Singh Sandhu	Indian Arrows	East Bengal	Loan Ended
21 July 2011	(India) Krishnan Nair Ajayan	Pune FC	Viva Kerala FC	Free
21 July 2011	(India) Sabas Saleel	ONGC FC	Viva Kerala FC	Free
21 July 2011	(India) Gunashekar Vignesh	Pune FC	Viva Kerala FC	Free
3 August 2011	(Ghana) Yusif Yakubu	Salgaocar SC	United Sports Club	Free
12 August 2011	(Senegal) Lamine Tamba	Pune F.C.	Air India FC	Free
12 August 2011	(India) Kali Alaudeen	Free Agent	Air India FC	Free
17 August 2011	(India) Deepak Mondal	Mohun Bagan A.C.	Prayag United S.C.	Free
