= List of Chirag United Club Kerala seasons =

Chirag United Club Kerala is an Indian association football club based in Kerala. The club was formed in 2004 as Viva Kerala before being renamed as Chirag United Club Kerala in 2011.

Chirag United Club Kerala have never won the League championship, and the Federation Cup.

== Key ==
- P = Played
- W = Games won
- D = Games drawn
- L = Games lost
- F = Goals for
- A = Goals against
- Pts = Points
- Pos = Final position
- IL = I-League
- IL2 = I-League 2nd Division
- F = Final
- Group = Group stage
- R16 = Round of 16
- QF = Quarter-finals
- R1 = Round 1
- R2 = Round 2
- R3 = Round 3
- R4 = Round 4
- R5 = Round 5
- R6 = Round 6
- SF = Semi-finals

1st or W	Winners
2nd or RU	Runners-up
↑	Promoted
↓	Relegated
♦	Top scorer in division

== Seasons ==
Results of league and cup competitions by season
Season	Division	P	W	D	L	F	A	Pts	Pos	Federation Cup	Super Cup	Asia	Round reached	Name	Goals
Season	League									Federation Cup	Super Cup	Asia	Round reached	Top goalscorer	
2007-08	IL	18	3	3	12	13	38	12	9th	QF	—	—	—	Wisdom Abbey	5
2009	IL2	9	5	2	2	17	21	10	3rd	—	—	—	—	Babatunbe	5
2009-10	IL	26	7	9	10	25	36	30	10th	GS	—	—	—	—	—
2010-11	IL	26	6	9	11	30	36	27	10th	GS	—	—	—	Anil Kumar	11
2012-12	↓IL	26	6	2	18	28	50	20	12th	GS	—	—	—	David Sunday	10
