= Badmus Babatunde =

Nigerian footballer

Personal information
- Date of birth: 28 February 1986 (age 40)
- Place of birth: Nigeria
- Position: Forward

Senior career*
Years	Team	Apps	(Gls)
2006–2009	Viva Kerala		
2007	→ Salgaocar S.C. (loan)		
2010–2012	ONGC		(11)
2012–2013	Rangdajied United		
2013–2014	Royal Wahingdoh		
2015–2016	Gangtok Himalayan		
2016	Chennai United		
- * Club domestic league appearances and goals as of 7 May 2016

Ayomide Babatunde Badmus (28 February 1986) is a Nigerian footballer who plays as a forward. Babatunde has played for ONGC F.C. in 2010–11 I-League, scoring 11 goals before his club was relegated.

== Career ==
=== ONGC F.C. ===
Badmus Babatunde was a star scorer, as he guided ONGC F.C. to promotion after finishing undefeated in the Final Round of the 2010 I-League 2nd Division. They finished runners-up to the Sanquelim-based SESA Football Academy in Group-B, but in the Final Round, ONGC's unbeaten run meant they won the 2010 I-League 2nd Division and were promoted to the 2010-11 I-League. Babatunde had scored against Vasco S.C. in the 1-0 win, then against Malabar United in the 3-1 win, against Oil India in the 4-1 win, against HAL in 2-1 win, once in these consecutive matches.
In the 2010-11 I-League, he scored a brace in the 2-5 loss against Dempo S.C. in September 2010. In December, he scored against AIFF XI at the Tau Devi Lal Stadium in the 1-1 draw. He scored a brace against Prayag United S.C. in the 2-4 loss in January. He shocked the East Bengal F.C. by scoring in a 1-0 win in February. He had scored the only goal for his side in the 1-2 loss against Air India in March 2011. In April 2011, he again scored yet another brace against Churchill Brothers S.C. to shock the Salcette-based side to a 3-3 draw at Fatorda Stadium. On a must-win home match against Mumbai F.C. in May 2011, he scored to give a 2-0 lead, but it finally ended 2-2, and ONGC F.C. were again relegated on a head-to-head basis He had finished with 11 goals in the 2010-11 I-League.

=== Rangdajied United ===
In January 2012, the Shillong-based club Ar-Hima, later renamed as Rangdajied United F.C., signed Babatunde. In Group 1 of 2012 I-League 2nd Division, he scored once against Bhawanipore F.C. in the 3-3 draw at Silchar. However, they failed to qualify to the Final Round as they finished 3rd in the Group Stage.
In the 2013 I-League 2nd Division, he scored in the 1-1 draw in the opening match against Southern Samity. Thereafter, he had a lean run in the 1st leg of the final round. But he finished the final round with successive hat-tricks against Langsning F.C. (3-1 win on 22 April), and then against Southern Samity (3-1 win on 24 April), which helped his side catapult past Bhawanipore F.C. to be the runners-up, and earn promotion to the 2013–14 I-League. Babatunde became the highest scorer with 8 goals, along with Bhawanipore F.C.'s Hudson Lima Da Silva.

== Later career ==
Following his time with Rangdajied United, Babatunde signed with Royal Wahingdoh and Gangtok Himalayan and played in the I-League 2nd Division with the clubs. He then signed with Chennai United in the CFA First Division in 2016.
