= DBFC =

DBFC may refer to:

- Dengeki Bunko: Fighting Climax
- Denzong Boys FC
- Deputy British Forces Cyprus
- Direct borohydride fuel cell
- Don Bosco Formation Center
- Don Bosco Foundation of Cambodia
- Dynamo Blues F.C.
