= Chirag United =

Chirag United may refer to these soccer (football) clubs in India:

- Chirag United Club Kerala, formed as Viva Kerala FC in 2004, adopted current name in 2011; in Kerala
- Prayag United S.C. or United SC, known as Chirag United from 2007 to 2011; in Kolkata
