= National Football League Third Division (India) =

- Founded: 2006
- Folded: 2007
- Country: India
- Confederation: AFC
- Level on pyramid: 3
- Promotion to: National Football League Second Division
- Domestic cup(s): Federation Cup; Durand Cup

The National Football League Third Division (NFL 3rd Division) was the men's third-tier of the Indian football league system from 2006 to 2007. Founded by the All India Football Federation (AIFF) in 2006, the NFL was the first third division football league in India to be organized on a national scale. The league was played from 25 November up to 18 December 2006 as a promotional tournament for Indian National Football League Second Division. Five teams were promoted to the second division.

== Promoted to National Football League Second Division ==
Season	North Zone	East Zone	South Zone	North-East Zone
2006–07	J&K Bank	South East Central Railway	Viva Kerala & Indian Bank	Shillong Lajong

== See also ==
- Federation Cup
- I-League 2
- I-League 3
- Indian National Football League
- Indian Super Cup (1997–2011)
- Indian Super League
- Super Cup
