= Aleksandar Šujdović =

Yugoslav footballer

Personal information
- Date of birth: 1 February 1980 (age 46)
- Place of birth: Kragujevac, SFR Yugoslavia
- Height: 1.84 m (6 ft 1/2 in)
- Position: Forward

Senior career*
Years	Team	Apps	(Gls)
1996–1998	Arsenal Kragujevac	41	(30)
1999–2000	Železnik		
2000–2001	Sopron	18	(7)
2001–2002	Marcali VFC	16	(17)
2002–2003	Mladost Gacko	16	(6)
2002–2003	BSK Batajnica	20	(13)
2004–2005	Kassandra	7	(3)
2006–2007	Chalkida	22	(7)
2007–2008	Al Nasr	10	(6)
2010–2011	Sheikh Jamal	6	(4)
2011–2012	HAL	10	(7)
Total		166	(100)

International career
1995–1996	FR Yugoslavia U-17	8	(6)
- * Club domestic league appearances and goals

Aleksandar Šujdović (born 1 February 1980) is a Serbian former footballer. His career spanned 16 years across different countries throughout Europe, as well as in the Middle East and in Bangladesh and India.

== See also ==
- Football in Serbia
