= Pakir Ali =

Sri Lankan football coach

Personal information
- Full name: Mohamed Nizam Packeer Ally
- Date of birth: 5 July 1953 (age 73)
- Place of birth: Colombo, Sri Lanka
- Height: 1.73 m (5 ft 8 in)
- Position: Centre back

Youth career
- Colombo FC

Senior career*
Years	Team	Apps	(Gls)
1980	Vasco Goa		
1981–1989	Dhaka Abahani		

International career
1976–1986	Sri Lanka		

Managerial career
- 1989–1992: PWD SC
- 1999: Dhaka Abahani
- 2001: Mohammedan SC
- 2011–2011: Sheikh Jamal DC
- 2011–2012: Chirag United Club Kerala
- 2015–2016: Team BJMC
- 2018–2020: Sri Lanka
- 2020–2021: Bangladesh Police
- * Club domestic league appearances and goals

Pakir Ali (Sinhala: පාකීර් අලි, pronounced [paːkiːr ali]) is a Sri Lankan retired professional footballer and football coach, who last managed Bangladesh Premier League club Bangladesh Police FC. His highest success as a coach was leading the Sheikh Jamal DC to the 2010–11 Bangladesh League title.

== Playing career ==
As a footballer, Ali spent almost a decade with Bangladeshi club Abahani Krira Chakra along with his compatriot Ratnayaka Premalal. Prior to that, he played for Indian club Vasco SC in 1980, and appeared in the Goa Professional League.

== Biography ==
Pakir was a passionate footballer and currently a successful football coach. He holds AFC A coaching license. Since 2016, he has been working as the head coach of the Sri Lanka national football team. He was also in charge of Chirag United Kerala FC in the I-League, but his team relegated form the 2011–12 season. In February 2012, he was sacked by the club and was succeeded by Ananta Kumar Ghosh.

== Honours ==
=== Player ===
Abahani Limited Dhka

- Dhaka First Division League: 1981, 1983, 1984, 1985
- Federation Cup: 1982, 1985, 1986, 1988

=== Manager ===
Sheikh Jamal Dhanmondi Club

- Bangladesh Premier League: 2010–11

Abahani Limited Dhaka

- Federation Cup: 1999
