= 2010 I-League 2nd Division =

3rd season of the I-League 2nd Division

I-League 2nd Division
- Season: 2009–10
- Champions: ONGC
- Promoted: ONGC; HAL
- Matches: 63
- Goals: 193 (3.06 per match)

The 2010 I-League 2nd division was the third season of the second tier of the I-League, the highest football league in India. It commenced on 26 March 2010 with the first matches of the first round and ended in early May 2010 with the last matches of the promotion round. All matches are played in three venues at Delhi, Bangalore and Tripura.

== Team summaries ==
The first round was competed by 21 teams, which have been divided into three groups with seven teams each. The two teams relegated from I-League directly played in the final round.

Club	City/State	Group
Amity United	Gurgaon, Haryana	B
Ar-Hima	Meghalaya	C
BEML	Bangalore, Karnataka	A
Chandni	Kozhikode, Kerala	A
Denzong Boys	Sikkim	C
Golden Threads	Kerala	A
Gauhati Town	Guwahati, Assam	C
HAL	Bangalore, Karnataka	A
Hindustan	New Delhi	B
Indian National	New Delhi	B
JCB Bhilai	Chhattisgarh	C
Malabar United	Kochi, Kerala	A
Mohammedan Sporting	Kolkata, West Bengal	Final
Mumbai United FC	Mumbai, Maharashtra	C
New Delhi Heroes	New Delhi	B
NISA	Imphal, Manipur	C
Oil India	Duliajan, Assam	C
ONGC	Mumbai, Maharashtra	B
SBT	Trivandrum, Kerala	A
Simla Youngs	New Delhi	B
SESA	Margao, Goa	B
Titanium	Trivandrum, Kerala	A
Vasco	Goa	Final

== First round ==
Each team competed a single match against every other team of its group. The best two teams from each group advanced to the final round.

=== Group A ===
==== Group table ====
Pos	Team	Pld	W	D	L	GF	GA	GD	Pts	Qualification
1	Malabar United (A)	6	3	3	0	10	7	+3	12	Qualification for Final Round
2	HAL (A)	5	2	3	0	11	3	+8	9	Qualification for Final Round
3	BEML	6	2	3	1	14	10	+4	9	
4	SBT	5	2	0	3	9	7	+2	6	
5	Titanium	6	1	3	2	4	8	−4	6	
6	Chandni	6	1	2	3	5	12	−7	5	
7	Golden Threads	6	1	2	3	5	11	−6	5	

Source: Soccerway
Rules for classification: 1) points; 2) goal difference; 3) number of goals scored.
(A) Advance to a further round

==== Results ====
Home \ Away	BEML	CND	GTH	HAL	MAL	SBT	TIT
BEML		6–0			2–2		1–1
Chandni				2–2	1–1		1–2
Golden Threads	2–2	0–1				2–1	
HAL	3–0		5–0			SUSP (Note: The match was suspended at an unknown time and score for unknown reasons.)	
Malabar United			2–1	1–1		2–1	
SBT	2–3	1–0					4–0
Titanium			0–0	0–0	1–2		

Source: Soccerway
Legend: Blue = home team win; Yellow = draw; Red = away team win.

=== Group B ===
==== Group table ====
Pos	Team	Pld	W	D	L	GF	GA	GD	Pts	Qualification
1	SESA (A)	6	5	0	1	17	6	+11	15	Qualification for Final Round
2	ONGC (A)	6	4	1	1	16	3	+13	13	Qualification for Final Round
3	Hindustan	6	3	1	2	10	8	+2	10	
4	Amity United	6	3	0	3	8	12	−4	9	
5	New Delhi Heroes	6	2	1	3	14	10	+4	7	
6	Simla Youngs	6	1	1	4	8	22	−14	4	
7	Indian National	6	1	0	5	3	15	−12	3	

Source: Soccerway
Rules for classification: 1) points; 2) goal difference; 3) number of goals scored.
(A) Advance to a further round

==== Results ====
Home \ Away	AMI	HIN	INN	NDH	ONGC	SESA	SIM
Amity United				1–6	0–2		5–2
Hindustan	2–0			0–0		1–2	
Indian Nationals	0–1	1–3				0–2	
New Delhi Heroes			1–2		0–2		5–1
ONGC		3–0	7–0				1–1
SESA	0–1			4–1	2–1		
Simla Youngs		2–4	1–0			1–7	

Source: Soccerway
Legend: Blue = home team win; Yellow = draw; Red = away team win.

=== Group C ===
==== Group table ====
Pos	Team	Pld	W	D	L	GF	GA	GD	Pts	Qualification
1	NISA (A)	6	5	0	1	14	6	+8	15	Qualification for Final Round
2	Oil India (A)	6	4	1	1	12	3	+9	13	Qualification for Final Round
3	JCB Bhillai Brothers	6	2	3	1	10	6	+4	9	
4	Ar-Hima	6	2	2	2	8	11	−3	8	
5	Mumbai United	6	2	1	3	8	9	−1	7	
6	Guwahati Town	6	1	2	3	5	10	−5	5	
7	Denzong Boys	6	0	1	5	2	14	−12	1	

Source: Soccerway
Rules for classification: 1) points; 2) goal difference; 3) number of goals scored.
(A) Advance to a further round

==== Results ====
Home \ Away	ArH	DEN	GUW	JCB	MU	NIS	OIL
Ar-Hima					1–0	2–4	0–3
Denzong Boys	1–2		1–1	0–4			
Guwahati Town	1–1					1–2	1–3
JCB Bhillai Brothers	2–2		3–0			0–3	
Mumbai United		4–0	0–1	1–1			
NISA		1–0			2–3		2–0
Oil India		2–0		0–0	4–0		

Source: Soccerway
Legend: Blue = home team win; Yellow = draw; Red = away team win.

== Final round ==
Malabar United and Hindustan Aeronautics from Group A, SESA and ONGC from Group B and NISA and Oil India from Group C qualified for the final round. They will be joined by the sides having been relegated from the 2008–09 I-League, Mohammedan Sporting from Kolkata and Vasco from Goa. As in the first round, each club will play a single match against every other team of the group. All matches will be played at Bangalore.

=== Preview of final round ===
Eight teams will vie for a place in the next year ONGC I-League as Second Division final round goes underway from 30 April at the KSFA Stadium, Bangalore. With two last year relegated teams (Mohammedan Sporting and Vasco SC) and with six qualifiers from the preliminary round viz. NISA (Manipur), ONGC (Mumbai), Sesa Football Academy (Goa), Oil India (Assam), Malabar United (Kerala) and the local side HAL (Bangalore) the final round is all set to be a blockbuster event. It will be clash of two Goan outfit in the opening match as Vasco SC will take on their city rival Sesa Football Academy that will kick off at 1400 hrs, while HAL will host Malabar United in the second encounter of the day that will start at 1600 hrs. The preliminary round performance will surely boost all the qualifiers but final round is totally a different ball game and it was clearly seen in the last year's final round, when Sesa Football Academy after putting an impressive display in the first round, went on to go down in all the crucial final round matches. The most surprising team of the lot was without a doubt Kerala based side Malabar United, who kept their domination in the Group A even with the likes of HAL, SBT and BEML.

The best two teams from the final round will qualify for the 2010–11 I-League.

=== Group table ===
Pos	Team	Pld	W	D	L	GF	GA	GD	Pts	Qualification
1	ONGC (P)	7	6	1	0	14	4	+10	19	Qualification for 2010–11 I-League
2	HAL (P)	7	5	1	1	14	7	+7	16	Qualification for 2010–11 I-League
3	Vasco	7	4	1	2	14	5	+9	13	
4	Mohammedan Sporting	7	2	4	1	9	9	0	10	
5	Malabar United	7	3	1	3	8	9	−1	10	
6	SESA	7	0	3	4	5	12	−7	3	
7	Oil India	7	0	3	4	6	17	−11	3	
8	NISA	7	0	2	5	3	10	−7	2	

Updated to match(es) played on 25 May 2010. Source: Soccerway
Rules for classification: 1) points; 2) goal difference; 3) number of goals scored.
(P) Promoted

=== Results ===
==== Round 1 ====
30 April 2010
14:00

Vasco SC	2–1	SESA
Biju Kumar 75'; Joy Ferrao 85'	Report	Lesly Fernandes 40'

KSFA Stadium, Bangalore

30 April 2010
16:00

HAL SC	1–0	Malabar United
Jotin Singh 45+2'	Report

KSFA Stadium, Bangalore

1 May 2010
14:00

Mohammedan Sporting	1–1	ONGC FC
Eduardo Da Silva Escobar 75'	Report	A.Naresh 22'

KSFA Stadium, Bangalore

1 May 2010
16:00

NISA	1–1	Oil India FC
Makemnganba Meetei 41'	Report	H.Wary 34'

KSFA Stadium, Bangalore

==== Round 2 ====
4 May 2010
14:00

Malabar United	3–0	SESA
Enyinnaya Loveday 53'; Asif K 55'; Firos K 70'	Report

KSFA Stadium, Bangalore

4 May 2010
16:00

HAL SC	3–1	Oil India FC
Xavier Vijay Kumar 30', 71'; Satish Kumar J 53'	Report	Prasanta Choudhary 87'

KSFA Stadium, Bangalore

5 May 2010
15:30

NISA	0–2	Mohammedan Sporting
	Report	Theodore Sunday Wrobeh 38'; Eduardo Da Silva Escobar 90+4'

KSFA Stadium, Bangalore

5 May 2010
16:00

ONGC FC	1–0	Vasco SC
Badmus Babatunde 47'	Report

KSFA Stadium, Bangalore

==== Round 3 ====
8 May 2010
16:00

SESA	2–2	Oil India
Israil Gurung 24'; Inacio Colaco 80'	Report	Manas Manjit Chetia 69', 86'

KSFA Stadium, Bangalore

8 May 2010
16:00

Malabar United	1–3	ONGC FC
Firos K 43'	Report	Badmus Babatunde 27'; Jatin Singh 80'; Bolaji 4'

KSFA Stadium, Bangalore

9 May 2010
16:00

Vasco SC	2–0	NISA
	Report

KSFA Stadium, Bangalore

5 May 2010
16:00

HAL SC	4–1	Mohammedan Sporting
Xavier Vijay Kumar 37', 77'	Report

KSFA Stadium, Bangalore

==== Round 4 ====
13 May 2010
14:00

Vasco SC	1–2	HAL SC
Sibra Narzary 2'	Report	Satish Kumar Jr. 51'; Fredrick Okwagbe 20'

KSFA Stadium, Bangalore

13 May 2010
16:00

NISA	0–1	Malabar United
	Report	Javed P K 17'

KSFA Stadium, Bangalore

12 May 2010
14:00

Mohammedan Sporting	2–1	SESA
Theodore Sunday Wrobeh 38'; Deb Kumar Sasmal 74'	Report	Jaiganesh Goltekar 45+4'

KSFA Stadium, Bangalore

12 May 2010
16:00

ONGC FC	4–1	Oil India FC
Tarif Ahmed 28' 44' 66'	Report	H L Routa 77'

KSFA Stadium, Bangalore

==== Round 5 ====
16 May 2010
14:00

Vasco SC	4–0	Malabar United
Joy Ferrao 26' 64'; Koko Sakibo 74' 91'	Report

KSFA Stadium, Bangalore

17 May 2010
16:00

HAL SC	1–2	ONGC FC
Satish Kumar (Jr.) 8'	Report	Badmus Babatunde 4'; A.Naresh 32'

KSFA Stadium, Bangalore

16 May 2010
14:00

Mohammedan Sporting	1–1	Oil India FC
Amrit Pal Singh '8'	Report	Zaidin Hmar 70'

KSFA Stadium, Bangalore

17 May 2010
16:00

NISA	0–1	SESA
Dewan Singh 81'	Report	Israil Gurung 66'

KSFA Stadium, Bangalore

==== Round 6 ====
20 May 2010
16:00

HAL SC	2–1	NISA
Karthigeyan 45+4'; Satish Kumar Jr 87'	Report	S.Thomas Singh 74'

KSFA Stadium, Bangalore

20 May 2010
16:00

Vasco SC	4–0	Oil India FC
Koko Sakibo 30', 76', 83'; Joy Ferrao 58'	[ Report]

KSFA Stadium, Bangalore

21 May 2010
14:00

ONGC FC	2–0	SESA
75'; 85'	[ Report]

KSFA Stadium, Bangalore

21 May 2010
14:00

Mohammedan Sporting	1–1	ONGC FC
75'	[ Report]	22'

KSFA Stadium, Bangalore

==== Round 7 ====
24 May 2010
14:00

Vasco SC	1–1	Mohammedan Sporting
	[ Report]

KSFA Stadium, Bangalore

24 May 2010
16:00

HAL SC	1–1	SESA
45+2'	[ Report]

KSFA Stadium, Bangalore

25 May 2010
14:00

Malabar United	2–0	Oil India FC
75'	[ Report]

KSFA Stadium, Bangalore

25 May 2010
16:00

NISA	0–1	ONGC FC
	[ Report]	H 34'

KSFA Stadium, Bangalore

==== Overall ====
Home \ Away	HAL	MAL	MSC	NIS	OIL	ONGC	SESA	VSC
HAL		1–0			3–1			
Malabar United							3–0	
Mohammedan	1–4					1–1		
NISA			0–2		1–1			0–2
Oil India FC						1–4	2–2	
ONGC		3–1						1–0
SESA FA			1–2					
Vasco SC							2–1	

Updated to match(es) played on pre-stage. Source: Soccerway
Legend: Blue = home team win; Yellow = draw; Red = away team win.
