= 2011 I-League 2nd Division final round =

2011 I-League 2nd Division final round involved eight teams, two from every group of 2011 I-League 2nd Division plus Shillong Lajong and Sporting Goa. United Sikkim, Southern Samity, Mohammedan, Royal Wahingdoh, Vasco and Ar-Hima qualified for Final round.

The top two teams at the end of final round qualify for 2011-12 I-league only if they complete all AFC requirements.

== Teams and location ==
Locations of teams in the 2010-11 I-League

Club	City/state	Stadium	Capacity
Mohammedan Sporting	Kolkata	Salt Lake Stadium, Kolkata	120,000
Vasco	Goa	Jawaharlal Nehru – Fatorda Stadium	27,300
United Sikkim	Sikkim	Paljor Stadium, Gangtok	15,000
Royal Wahingdoh	Meghalaya	Jawaharlal Nehru Stadium	25,000
Ar-Hima	Meghalaya	Jawaharlal Nehru Stadium	25,000
Shillong Lajong	Meghalaya	Jawaharlal Nehru Stadium	25,000
Southern Samity	West Bengal	Unknown	Unknown
Sporting Goa	Goa	Fatorda Stadium	27,300

== Standings ==
=== Group table ===
Team	Pld	W	D	L	GF	GA	GD	Pts	
Shillong Lajong	7	5	1	1	12	6	6	16	I-League 2011-12
Sporting Goa	7	4	2	1	10	6	4	14	I-League 2011-12
Vasco	7	4	1	2	13	8	5	13	
Ar-Hima	7	3	2	2	11	8	3	11	
United Sikkim	7	2	4	1	9	9	0	10	
Royal Wahingdoh	7	1	2	4	12	13	−1	5	
Mohammedan Sporting	7	1	1	5	4	9	−5	4	
Southern Samity	7	1	1	5	4	16	−12	4	
