= Selwyn Fernandes =

Indian footballer (born 1980)

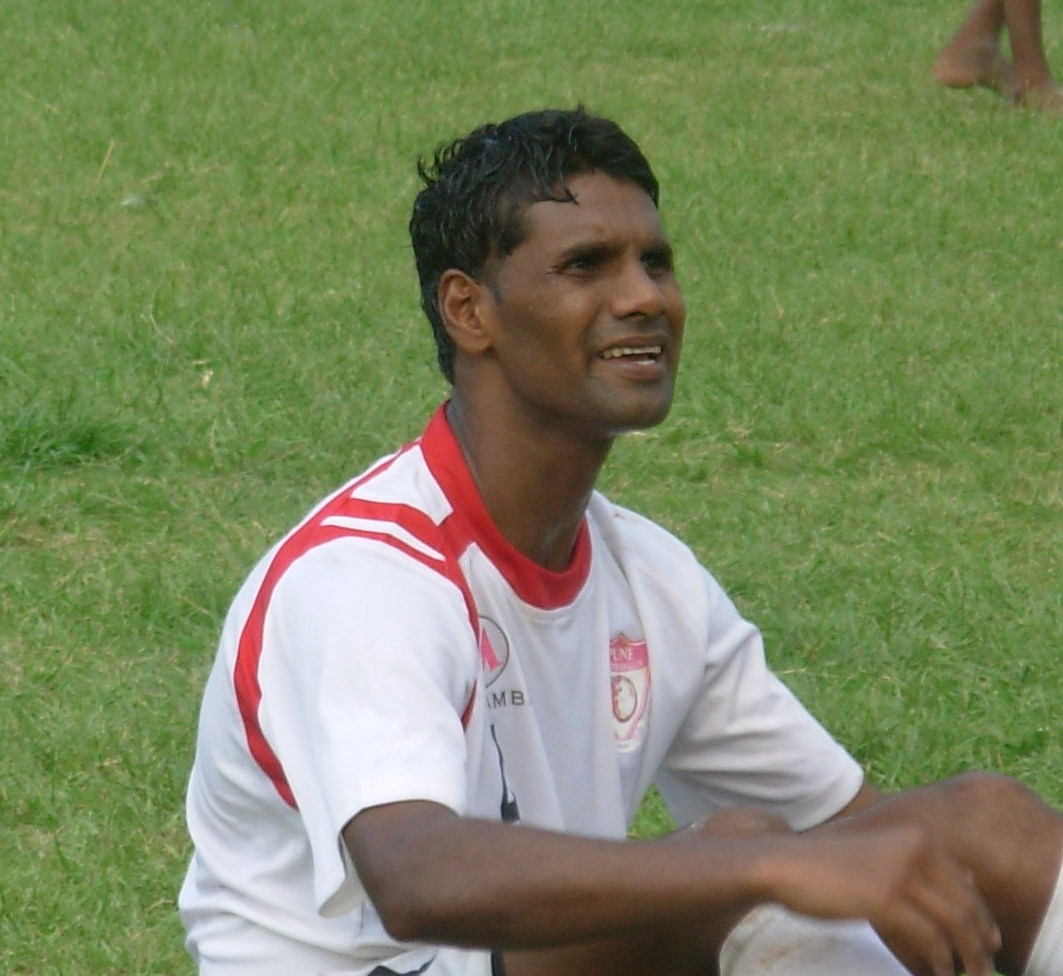

Personal information
- Date of birth: 20 March 1980 (age 46)
- Place of birth: Chinchinim, Goa, India
- Height: 1.74 m (5 ft 8 1/2 in)
- Position: Defender

Senior career*
Years	Team	Apps	(Gls)
2001–2002	Fransa-Pax		
2002–2004	Vasco		
2004–2005	East Bengal		
2005–2006	Salgaocar		
2006–2007	Raia		
2007–2008	Churchill Brothers		
2008–2009	Mumbai		
2009–2011	Pune		
2011–2014	Dempo		

International career
2003–2005	India	4	(0)
- * Club domestic league appearances and goals

Selwyn Fernandes (born 20 March 1980) is a retired Indian professional footballer who played as a defender and last played for I-League club Dempo.

Fernandes has also played at Fransa-Pax, Vasco, East Bengal, Salgaocar, Raia, Churchill Brothers, Mumbai, and Pune in the league and he has also played internationally with India.

== Honours ==
India

- SAFF Championship third place: 2003
- Afro-Asian Games silver medal: 2003
