= Joy Ferrao =

Indian footballer (born 1987)

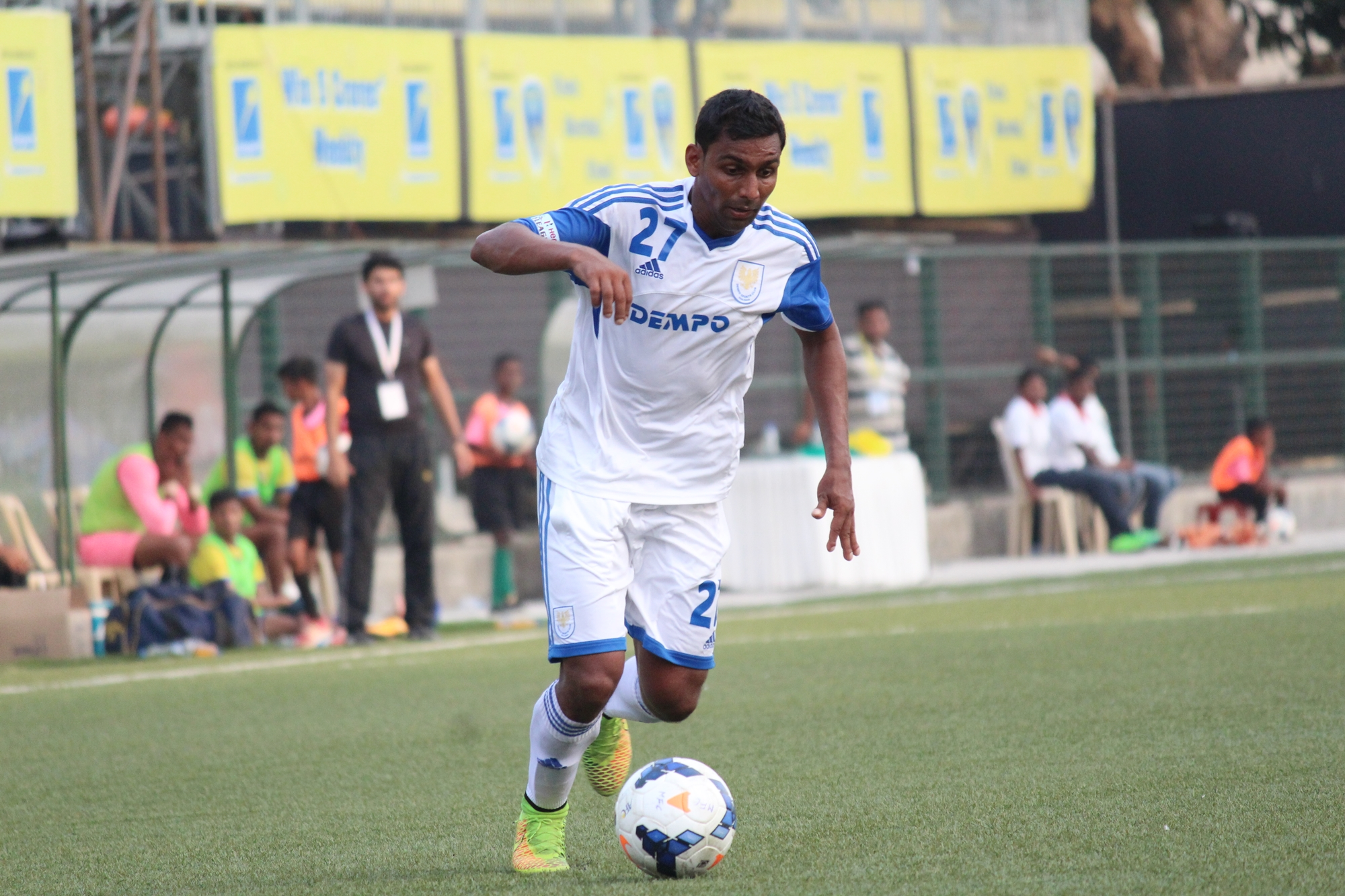
- Ferrao with Dempo SC in 2015

Personal information
- Date of birth: 30 April 1987 (age 39)
- Place of birth: Verna, Goa, India
- Height: 1.80 m (5 ft 11 in)
- Position: Forward

Team information
- Current team: Dempo
- Number: 27

Youth career
- –2010: Vasco

Senior career*
Years	Team	Apps	(Gls)
2010–2011	Vasco		
2011–	Dempo	31	(3)
- * Club domestic league appearances and goals as of 16:31, 23 May 2015 (UTC)

Joy Ferrao (born 30 April 1987) is an Indian footballer who plays as a forward for Dempo S.C. in the I-League. Joy Ferrao was originally a youth player for Vasco SC and broke into the first-team in 2010 and became the top scorer for club and the whole league during the 2010 I-League 2nd Division.

== Career ==
=== Vasco ===
Ferrao broke into the Vasco SC first team in time for the 2010 I-League 2nd Division. After the campaign Vasco did not win promotion but Ferrao became the top scorer of the league by scoring four goals throughout the campaign. The next season Ferrao again became top scorer but only for his club and he became the top assist provider as well.

=== Dempo ===
On 18 July 2011 Ferrao signed for two-time I-League champions Dempo S.C. for the 2011-12 I-League season. Ferrao made his Dempo debut during the first match of the 2011 Indian Federation Cup on 17 September 2011 against Pune and straight away he made his impact for the club by scoring in that game in the 87th minute. Dempo went on to lose the match 1–2. He then made his I-League debut on 2 November 2011 against Mohun Bagan, coming on as an 82nd minute substitution for Joaquim Abranches as Dempo won the match 5–0. Ferrao then scored his first goal for the club on 22 December 2011 against Sporting Clube de Goa in the I-League. Dempo won the match 3–2.

Ferrao then scored his second goal for the club on 19 January 2013 against United Sikkim F.C. at the Duler Stadium in which Dempo won 7–0 against the Snow Lions and Joy scoring in the 84th minute.

== Career statistics ==
=== Club ===
As of 23 May 2015

Club	Season	League		Cup		AFC		Total	
Club	Season	Apps	Goals	Apps	Goals	Apps	Goals	Apps	Goals
Dempo	2011–12	8	1	2	1	—	—	10	2
Dempo	2012–13	11	2	0	0	0	0	11	2
Dempo	2013–14	6	0	0	0	—	—	6	0
Dempo	2014–15	6	0	0	0	—	—	6	0
Career total		31	3	2	1	0	0	33	4
