= Simon Azoulay Pedersen =

Danish footballer (born 1982)

Simon A. Pedersen
Personal information
- Full name: Simon Azoulay Pedersen
- Date of birth: 14 December 1982 (age 43)
- Place of birth: Copenhagen, Denmark
- Height: 1.83 m (6 ft 0 in)
- Position: Forward

Youth career
- B 93

Senior career*
Years	Team	Apps	(Gls)
–2001	B 93	?	(?)
2001–2005	AB	45	(?)
2005–2007	Esbjerg fB	36	(6)
2007–2010	Silkeborg IF	29	(11)
2008	Turun Palloseura (loan)	9	(5)
2010–2011	FC Fyn		
2011–2012	Viva Kerala FC		
2015–2016	Ringkøbing IF		
2016–2017	Silkeborg KFUM		

International career^{‡}
1998	Denmark U16	2	(0)
1999	Denmark U17	5	(0)
1999–2001	Denmark U19	15	(7)
- * Club domestic league appearances and goals as of 18 June 2020 ‡ National team caps and goals as of 18 June 2020

Simon Azoulay Pedersen (born 14 December 1982) is a Danish former professional footballer who played as a forward. From 1998 to 2001, he played 22 games and scored five goals for Denmark in different age levels.
