= Chandni FC =

Indian association football club

Chandni
- Full name: Chandni Football Club Calicut
- Nickname(s): Calicut Blue Blood
- Founded: 2000; 25 years ago
- League: Kerala Premier League
Home colours	Away colours

Chandni Football Club was an Indian professional football club based in Calicut, Kerala. The club has formerly played in the I-League 2nd Division, alongside the Kerala Premier League.

== History ==
Founded in 2000 in Calicut, Chandni FC participated in the I-League 2nd Division in 2009, but could not progress further than the group stage.

== Supporters ==
During its time as Calicut Chandni FC, a fan club named Calicut Blue Blood were the supporters.

== Records ==
Season	Div.	Tms.	Pos.	Attendance/G	Federation Cup
2008–09	IL2	15	GS, 3rd	-	DNP
2009–10	IL2	21	GS, 6th	–	DNP
2010–11	IL2	21	GS, 7th	–	DNP

Key

- Tms. = Number of teams
- Pos. = Position in league
- Attendance/G = Average league attendance
