= I-League 2 =

Third division men's association football league in India

- Organising body: AIFF
- Founded: 2008; 18 years ago (as I-League 2nd Division, succeeding NFL 2nd Division); 2023; 3 years ago (as I-League 2)
- Country: India
- Confederation: AFC
- Number of clubs: 10
- Level on pyramid: 3
- Promotion to: Indian Football League
- Relegation to: I-League 3
- Domestic cup: Durand Cup (Note: Participation via an invitation)
- Current champions: Delhi (2nd title)
- Most championships: ONGC; Delhi (2 titles each)
- Broadcaster: SportsKPI (online streaming)
- Website: indianfootballleague.in
- Current: 2026–27 I-League 2

The I-League 2 is an Indian men's professional football league. It is the 3rd tier of the Indian football league system, behind the Indian Super League and the Indian Football League. It operates as a system of promotion and relegation with the Indian Football League and the I-League 3.

== History ==
I-League 2nd Division was introduced during the 2008 season, with first game played on 25 March between Mohammedan Sporting and Amity United.

That season saw Mohammedan Sporting, Mumbai FC, Vasco SC and Chirag United promoted to the I-League. The next season saw Pune FC, Shillong Lajong, Viva Kerala and Salgaocar getting promoted.

Since 2010, only top 2 teams were promoted to the I-League. ONGC FC and HAL SC in that year, in 2011 Shillong Lajong and Sporting Clube de Goa, with Lajong being promoted for the second time. In 2012, ONGC and United Sikkim were promoted for the upcoming season. The 2013 saw Rangdajied United FC and Mohammedan qualifying for the I-League.

In 2014, only one team got promoted from the 2nd Division, and similarly only one team got relegated from 2013–14 season.

In 2016, again only one team was promoted from the 2nd division (Aizawl F.C.), and only one was relegated from the I-League (Dempo).

Due to the COVID-19 pandemic, the traditional final round format was scrapped in 2020. It was decided that the league will be rescheduled into a new format and all non-reserve teams from the preliminary stage will automatically progress to this round. It was officially named as I-League Qualifiers. After making of I-League as second division of Indian football, the AIFF decided to rename 2nd Division to I-league 2.

== Competition format ==
=== 2008–2015 ===
Previously, the league was formatted as a neutral venue competition with teams split into groups in which all the groups play in one stadium each. The final round is contested in a double round-robin format, after which the top two teams get promoted to the I-League.

=== 2015–2017 ===
The I-League core committee approved the plans for the 2015–2016 I-League 2nd division matches to be played on a home and away basis. The preliminary rounds will be played as the conference system with the teams being divided into Eastern and Western conferences. Top 3 teams from each conference will qualify for the final round of the 2015–2016 season of 2nd division I-League.

To widen the football map of the country and to bolster the football structure, I-League committee decide to launch the 2nd division qualifier for 2016–2017 season. Participants from all the state associations would be invited to take part in 2nd division 2016–17 qualifiers. The state associations need to nominate two teams with best results, apart from the teams who would compete in Hero I-League and 2nd division league, from the state leagues to compete in the 2nd division qualifiers. The teams will fight it out amongst themselves in the zonal round followed by the final round. Eventually top two teams from the final round will get a nod to the 2nd division, provided that they fulfill the club licensing requirements in the due time.

=== 2017–2018 ===
The format was further altered from 2017–2018 season, the league was divided in two stages: the Preliminary and the Final. The tournament will also feature reserve teams of Indian Super League clubs. In the preliminary stage, 18 teams are divided into three groups where all matches would be played on a home and away basis. The winners of each group plus the best second-placed team would qualify for the final round. However, if reserve teams of ISL clubs finishes as winners or runners-up in any group, the position is passed on onto the next non-ISL team. The final round will be played at a central venue, the winners of which would be promoted to the next tier of Indian Football.

=== 2018–2019 ===
Sixteen teams were allowed to participate in this season by the league committee.

=== 2021 ===
A new format was introduced named as I-league qualifiers. 10 teams promoted from state leagues battled for I-league qualification.

=== 2022–2023 ===
In a meeting held on 16 December 2022, the AIFF league committee has recommended that states that have conducted their regional leagues in previous season nominate clubs for the Hero I-League 2, with six reserve teams of the Hero ISL also joining them. A pre-tournament qualifier was held for the teams from states that have not conducted their leagues in 2021–22, from which the top two teams gained entry into the Hero I-League 2, bringing the total number of clubs to 20.

These 20 teams are divided into the four groups of five and play each other in a round-robin home and away format. The group winners, along with the best second-placed team, play in the final round, a single-leg round robin format competition.

== Clubs ==
Locations of the 2026–27 I-League 2 teams

| Club | City | State | Stadium | Capacity |
|---|---|---|---|---|
| Banaras Baghpat | Baghpat | Uttar Pradesh | | |
| Karbi Anglong Morning Star | Diphu | Assam | KASA Stadium | 9,000 |
| MYJ–GMSC | Mumbai | Maharashtra | Cooperage Ground | 5,000 |
| Namdhari | Sri Bhaini Sahib | Punjab | Namdhari Stadium | 1,000 |
| NEROCA | Imphal | Manipur | Khuman Lampak Stadium | 35,285 |
| Raengdai | Noney | Manipur | | |
| Sporting Goa | Panaji | Goa | Bambolim Stadium | 3,000 |
| Sudeva Delhi | New Delhi | Delhi | | |
| United | Kalyani | West Bengal | Kalyani Stadium | 20,000 |
| Sporting Bengaluru | Bengaluru | Karnataka | Bangalore Football Stadium | 8,400 |

== All-time clubs ==
| I-League 2 |
| Indian Super League / I-League |
| I-League 3 / State leagues |
| Reserve sides (Indian Super League) |
| Defunct clubs |

As of 2026

| Pos. | Club | City | S | P | W | D | L | GF | GA | GD | Pts | 1st | 2nd | 3rd | Appearances |
|---|---|---|---|---|---|---|---|---|---|---|---|---|---|---|---|
| 1 | Mohammedan | Kolkata, West Bengal | 11 | 135 | 72 | 27 | 34 | 205 | 125 | 80 | 239 | 1 | 2 | 1 | 2008, 2010, 2011, 2012, 2013, 2015, 2015–16, 2016–17, 2017–18, 2018–19, 2020 |
| 2 | United SC | Kolkata, West Bengal | 6 | 72 | 30 | 18 | 24 | 96 | 92 | 4 | 108 | 0 | 0 | 2 | 2008, 2015, 2022-23, 2023-24, 2024-25, 2025–26 |
| 3 | Vasco | Vasco da Gama, Goa | 5 | 56 | 31 | 10 | 15 | 110 | 65 | 45 | 103 | 0 | 0 | 1 | 2008, 2010, 2011, 2012, 2013 |
| 4 | Bengaluru United | Bengaluru, Karnataka | 6 | 65 | 28 | 18 | 19 | 96 | 59 | 37 | 102 | 0 | 1 | 1 | 2020, 2021, 2022-23, 2023-24, 2024-25, 2025–26 |
| 5 | Royal Wahingdoh | Shillong, Meghalaya | 4 | 53 | 30 | 11 | 12 | 108 | 49 | 59 | 101 | 1 | 0 | 0 | 2011, 2012, 2013, 2014 |
| 6 | Lonestar Kashmir FC | Srinagar, Jammu and Kashmir | 6 | 92 | 24 | 24 | 44 | 97 | 138 | -41 | 96 | 0 | 1 | 0 | 2015, 2015–16, 2016–17, 2017–18, 2018–19, 2020 |
| 7 | NEROCA FC | Imphal, Manipur | 4 | 58 | 26 | 12 | 20 | 78 | 67 | 11 | 90 | 1 | 0 | 1 | 2015–16, 2016–17, 2024-25, 2025–26 |
| 8 | Kenkre | Mumbai, Maharashtra | 9 | 84 | 22 | 17 | 45 | 107 | 161 | -54 | 83 | 0 | 1 | 0 | 2011, 2012, 2013, 2014, 2015, 2015–16, 2016–17, 2021, 2023-24 |
| 9 | Bhawanipore FC | Bhawanipore, West Bengal | 4 | 45 | 22 | 14 | 9 | 78 | 52 | 26 | 80 | 0 | 2 | 1 | 2012, 2013, 2014, 2020 |
| 10 | Dempo | Panaji, Goa | 3 | 40 | 24 | 7 | 9 | 62 | 29 | 33 | 79 | 1 | 1 | 0 | 2015–16, 2022-23, 2023-24 |
| 11 | Rangdajied United | Shillong, Meghalaya | 4 | 43 | 23 | 8 | 12 | 86 | 56 | 30 | 77 | 1 | 0 | 0 | 2010, 2011, 2012, 2013 |
| 12 | ONGC | Mumbai, Maharashtra | 4 | 39 | 22 | 10 | 7 | 66 | 29 | 37 | 76 | 2 | 0 | 0 | 2008, 2009, 2010, 2012 |
| 13 | Southern Samity | Lake Gardens, West Bengal | 4 | 52 | 21 | 11 | 20 | 67 | 74 | -7 | 74 | 0 | 1 | 0 | 2011, 2012, 2013, 2016–17 |
| 14 | Langsning SC | Shillong, Meghalaya | 4 | 41 | 20 | 11 | 10 | 77 | 46 | 31 | 71 | 0 | 0 | 0 | 2011, 2012, 2013, 2017–18 |
| 15 | Aizawl FC | Aizawl, Mizoram | 4 | 44 | 21 | 7 | 16 | 91 | 72 | 19 | 70 | 1 | 0 | 0 | 2012, 2013, 2014, 2015 |
| 16 | Sporting Goa | Panaji, Goa | 4 | 45 | 20 | 9 | 16 | 55 | 47 | 8 | 69 | 0 | 1 | 1 | 2011, 2023-24, 2024-25, 2025–26 |
| 17 | TRAU FC | Imphal, Manipur | 3 | 45 | 20 | 9 | 16 | 72 | 67 | 5 | 69 | 1 | 0 | 0 | 2017–18, 2018–19, 2024-25 |
| 18 | Hindustan FC | Delhi | 7 | 66 | 18 | 12 | 36 | 71 | 127 | -56 | 66 | 0 | 1 | 0 | 2010, 2013, 2014, 2015, 2016–17, 2017–18, 2018–19 |
| 19 | United Sikkim | Gangtok, Sikkim | 3 | 39 | 18 | 11 | 10 | 73 | 56 | 17 | 65 | 0 | 1 | 0 | 2011, 2012, 2014 |
| 20 | Kalighat Milan Sangha | Kalighat, West Bengal | 3 | 39 | 18 | 9 | 12 | 69 | 43 | 36 | 63 | 0 | 0 | 1 | 2012, 2013, 2014 |
| 21 | Shillong Lajong | Shillong, Meghalaya | 3 | 29 | 18 | 6 | 5 | 53 | 27 | 26 | 60 | 1 | 1 | 1 | 2009, 2011, 2022-23 |
| 22 | Chanmari FC | Aizawl, Mizoram | 2 | 30 | 17 | 7 | 6 | 71 | 34 | 37 | 58 | 0 | 1 | 1 | 2015, 2024-25 |
| 23 | Fateh Hyderabad | Hyderabad, Telangana | 4 | 42 | 15 | 12 | 15 | 56 | 52 | 4 | 57 | 0 | 0 | 0 | 2015–16, 2016–17, 2017–18, 2018–19 |
| 24 | Delhi FC | Delhi | 3 | 27 | 17 | 5 | 5 | 64 | 23 | 41 | 56 | 2 | 0 | 1 | 2021, 2022-23, 2025–26 |
| 25 | Bengaluru FC (R) | Bengaluru, Karnataka | 4 | 32 | 17 | 5 | 10 | 63 | 38 | 25 | 56 | 0 | 0 | 0 | 2017–18, 2018–19, 2020, 2022-23 |
| 26 | Ozone FC | Bengaluru, Karnataka | 3 | 32 | 15 | 9 | 8 | 59 | 28 | 31 | 54 | 0 | 0 | 2 | 2016–17, 2017–18, 2018–19 |
| 27 | Sesa Football Academy | Sanquelim, Goa | 4 | 35 | 13 | 7 | 15 | 57 | 53 | 4 | 46 | 0 | 0 | 0 | 2009, 2010, 2011, 2012 |
| 28 | Techno Aryan | Kolkata, West Bengal | 3 | 21 | 10 | 4 | 7 | 43 | 21 | 22 | 44 | 0 | 0 | 0 | 2011, 2012, 2013 |
| 29 | Sporting Bengaluru | Bengaluru, Karnataka | 2 | 22 | 14 | 2 | 6 | 41 | 27 | 14 | 44 | 1 | 0 | 0 | 2023-24, 2025–26 |
| 30 | ARA FC | Ahmedabad, Gujarat | 4 | 31 | 12 | 8 | 11 | 44 | 42 | 2 | 44 | 0 | 0 | 0 | 2018–19, 2020, 2021, 2022-23 |
| 31 | KGF Academy (BEML FC) | Bengaluru, Karnataka | 4 | 27 | 8 | 7 | 12 | 42 | 50 | -8 | 41 | 0 | 0 | 0 | 2010, 2011, 2012, 2013 |
| 32 | Delhi United FC | Delhi | 3 | 33 | 8 | 15 | 10 | 35 | 42 | -7 | 39 | 0 | 0 | 1 | 2013, 2016–17, 2017–18 |
| 33 | Diamond Harbour | Diamond Harbour, West Bengal | 1 | 16 | 11 | 5 | 0 | 28 | 10 | 18 | 38 | 1 | 0 | 0 | 2024-25 |
| 34 | Real Kashmir FC | Srinagar, Jammu and Kashmir | 2 | 19 | 11 | 5 | 3 | 30 | 22 | 8 | 38 | 1 | 0 | 0 | 2016–17, 2017–18 |
| 35 | Sudeva Delhi | Delhi | 3 | 28 | 11 | 5 | 12 | 29 | 35 | -6 | 38 | 0 | 0 | 1 | 2016–17, 2023-24, 2025–26 |
| 36 | Minerva Punjab | Jalandhar, Punjab | 1 | 18 | 11 | 4 | 3 | 30 | 14 | 16 | 37 | 0 | 1 | 0 | 2015–16 |
| 37 | FC Goa (R) | Margao, Goa | 4 | 32 | 10 | 7 | 15 | 42 | 45 | -3 | 37 | 0 | 0 | 0 | 2017–18, 2018–19, 2020, 2022-23 |
| 38 | Kerala Blasters (R) | Kochi, Kerala | 3 | 25 | 10 | 4 | 11 | 41 | 44 | -3 | 34 | 0 | 0 | 0 | 2017–18, 2018–19, 2020 |
| 39 | Chhinga Veng FC | Aizawl, Mizoram | 1 | 16 | 10 | 3 | 3 | 30 | 17 | 13 | 33 | 0 | 1 | 0 | 2018–19 |
| 40 | Malabar United FC | Kochi, Kerala | 3 | 23 | 8 | 9 | 6 | 28 | 27 | 1 | 33 | 0 | 0 | 0 | 2009, 2010, 2011 |
| 41 | HAL | Bengaluru, Karnataka | 2 | 17 | 9 | 4 | 4 | 36 | 19 | 17 | 31 | 0 | 1 | 0 | 2008, 2010 |
| 42 | Golden Threads FC | Kochi, Kerala | 4 | 27 | 7 | 8 | 11 | 35 | 50 | -15 | 29 | 0 | 0 | 0 | 2010, 2011, 2012, 2022-23 |
| 43 | Chennaiyin FC (R) | Chennai, Tamilnadu | 4 | 35 | 8 | 5 | 20 | 31 | 68 | -37 | 29 | 0 | 0 | 0 | 2017–18, 2018–19, 2020, 2022-23 |
| 44 | FC Kerala | Thrissur, Kerala | 2 | 17 | 8 | 4 | 5 | 28 | 19 | 9 | 28 | 0 | 0 | 0 | 2017–18, 2020 |
| 45 | ATK (R) | Barasat, West Bengal | 2 | 18 | 8 | 4 | 6 | 25 | 23 | 2 | 28 | 0 | 0 | 0 | 2018–19, 2020 |
| 46 | Pune | Pune, Maharashtra | 2 | 19 | 8 | 3 | 8 | 26 | 24 | 2 | 27 | 0 | 0 | 0 | 2008, 2009 |
| 47 | North Imphal SA | Imphal, Manipur | 2 | 19 | 8 | 2 | 9 | 26 | 23 | 3 | 26 | 0 | 0 | 0 | 2010, 2011 |
| 48 | Mumbai | Mumbai, Maharashtra | 1 | 10 | 8 | 1 | 1 | 18 | 5 | 13 | 25 | 1 | 0 | 0 | 2008 |
| 49 | Mumbai Tigers FC | Mumbai, Maharashtra | 1 | 17 | 8 | 1 | 8 | 27 | 26 | 1 | 25 | 0 | 0 | 0 | 2013 |
| 50 | Jamshedpur (R) | Jamshedpur, Jharkhand | 3 | 28 | 6 | 7 | 15 | 28 | 55 | -27 | 25 | 0 | 0 | 0 | 2017–18, 2018–19, 2020 |
| 51 | PIFA Sports | Mumbai, Maharashtra | 6 | 48 | 5 | 9 | 34 | 41 | 117 | -76 | 25 | 0 | 0 | 0 | 2011, 2012, 2013, 2014, 2015, 2015–16 |
| 52 | Garhwal FC | Delhi | 2 | 16 | 7 | 3 | 6 | 27 | 29 | -2 | 24 | 0 | 0 | 0 | 2014, 2020 |
| 53 | Ambernath United Atlanta | Mumbai, Maharashtra | 1 | 12 | 7 | 2 | 3 | 27 | 17 | 10 | 23 | 0 | 0 | 1 | 2022-23 |
| 54 | Oil India FC | Duliajan, Assam | 3 | 22 | 5 | 8 | 9 | 29 | 34 | -5 | 23 | 0 | 0 | 0 | 2008, 2009, 2010 |
| 55 | SAT | Tirur, Kerala | 1 | 16 | 6 | 4 | 6 | 21 | 23 | -2 | 22 | 0 | 0 | 0 | 2024-25 |
| 56 | Eagles FC | Kochi, Kerala | 4 | 23 | 6 | 4 | 13 | 28 | 52 | -24 | 22 | 0 | 0 | 0 | 2011, 2012, 2013, 2014 |
| 57 | Downtown Heroes FC | Srinagar, Jammu and Kashmir | 1 | 11 | 6 | 3 | 2 | 15 | 8 | 7 | 21 | 0 | 0 | 0 | 2022-23 |
| 58 | Simla Youngs FC | Delhi | 5 | 31 | 4 | 9 | 18 | 33 | 78 | -45 | 21 | 0 | 0 | 0 | 2009, 2010, 2011, 2012, 2013 |
| 59 | Salgaocar | Vasco da Gama, Goa | 1 | 9 | 6 | 2 | 1 | 12 | 5 | 7 | 20 | 1 | 0 | 0 | 2009 |
| 60 | Josco FC | Ernakulam, Kerala | 2 | 14 | 6 | 2 | 6 | 21 | 21 | 0 | 20 | 0 | 0 | 0 | 2011, 2013 |
| 61 | Gangtok Himalayan S.C. | Gangtok, Sikkim | 1 | 18 | 4 | 7 | 7 | 16 | 20 | -4 | 19 | 0 | 0 | 0 | 2015–16 |
| 62 | Green Valley | Guwahati, Assam | 3 | 19 | 4 | 7 | 8 | 23 | 32 | -9 | 19 | 0 | 0 | 0 | 2012, 2013, 2014 |
| 63 | Viva Kerala | Kochi, Kerala | 1 | 9 | 5 | 2 | 2 | 21 | 10 | 11 | 17 | 0 | 1 | 0 | 2009 |
| 64 | DSK Shivajians | Pune, Maharashtra | 1 | 8 | 5 | 2 | 1 | 15 | 7 | 8 | 17 | 0 | 0 | 0 | 2013 |
| 65 | Amity United FC | Gurgaon, Haryana | 3 | 15 | 5 | 2 | 8 | 20 | 29 | -9 | 17 | 0 | 0 | 0 | 2008, 2009, 2010 |
| 66 | Maharashtra Oranje | Mumbai, Maharashtra | 1 | 14 | 4 | 3 | 7 | 20 | 25 | -5 | 15 | 0 | 0 | 0 | 2023-24 |
| 67 | Gauhati Town Club | Guwahati, Assam | 3 | 19 | 4 | 3 | 12 | 20 | 34 | -14 | 15 | 0 | 0 | 0 | 2010, 2011, 2012 |
| 68 | South United FC | Bengaluru, Karnataka | 2 | 15 | 3 | 5 | 7 | 22 | 28 | -6 | 14 | 0 | 0 | 0 | 2013, 2018–19 |
| 69 | Rainbow AC | New Barrackpore, West Bengal | 1 | 10 | 3 | 4 | 3 | 17 | 16 | 1 | 13 | 0 | 0 | 0 | 2018–19 |
| 70 | Jagat Singh Palahi | Phagwara, Punjab | 1 | 8 | 4 | 1 | 3 | 10 | 9 | 1 | 13 | 0 | 0 | 0 | 2022-23 |
| 71 | FC Pune City (R) | Pune, Maharashtra | 1 | 10 | 2 | 7 | 1 | 10 | 9 | 1 | 13 | 0 | 0 | 0 | 2017-18 |
| 72 | New Delhi Heroes | Delhi | 3 | 15 | 3 | 4 | 8 | 25 | 27 | -2 | 13 | 0 | 0 | 0 | 2008, 2009, 2010 |
| 73 | Rajasthan United | Jaipur, Rajasthan | 1 | 6 | 3 | 3 | 0 | 8 | 4 | 4 | 12 | 1 | 0 | 0 | 2021 |
| 74 | Techtro Swades United FC | Una, Himachal Pradesh, Himachal Pradesh | 1 | 8 | 4 | 0 | 4 | 9 | 8 | 1 | 12 | 0 | 0 | 0 | 2022-23 |
| 75 | Hyderabad FC (R) | Hyderabad, Telangana | 2 | 14 | 3 | 3 | 8 | 10 | 16 | -6 | 12 | 0 | 0 | 0 | 2020, 2022-23 |
| 76 | Samaleswari SC | Bhubaneswar, Odisha | 2 | 15 | 3 | 3 | 9 | 17 | 27 | -10 | 12 | 0 | 0 | 0 | 2012, 2013 |
| 77 | Morning Star | Diphu, Assam | 1 | 8 | 2 | 4 | 2 | 10 | 7 | 3 | 10 | 0 | 0 | 0 | 2025–26 |
| 78 | George Telegraph | Kolkata, West Bengal | 2 | 12 | 3 | 1 | 8 | 17 | 18 | -1 | 10 | 0 | 0 | 0 | 2009, 2013 |
| 79 | Chandni FC | Calicut, Kerala | 3 | 16 | 2 | 4 | 10 | 9 | 37 | -28 | 10 | 0 | 0 | 0 | 2009, 2010, 2011 |
| 80 | JCB Bhilai Brothers FC | Bhilai, Chhattisgarh | 1 | 6 | 2 | 3 | 1 | 10 | 6 | 4 | 9 | 0 | 0 | 0 | 2010 |
| 81 | Punjab FC (R) | Mohali, Punjab | 1 | 6 | 3 | 0 | 3 | 8 | 5 | 3 | 9 | 0 | 0 | 0 | 2020 |
| 82 | Guwahati FC | Guwahati, Assam | 1 | 8 | 2 | 3 | 3 | 9 | 8 | 1 | 9 | 0 | 0 | 0 | 2015-16 |
| 83 | Indian Bank Recreational Club | Chennai, Tamilnadu | 1 | 10 | 3 | 0 | 7 | 9 | 17 | -8 | 9 | 0 | 0 | 0 | 2008 |
| 84 | Luangmual FC | Aizawl, Mizoram | 2 | 14 | 2 | 3 | 9 | 16 | 40 | -24 | 9 | 0 | 0 | 0 | 2012, 2013 |
| 85 | Delhi Dynamos (R) | Delhi | 1 | 9 | 2 | 2 | 5 | 5 | 9 | -4 | 8 | 0 | 0 | 0 | 2017–18 |
| 86 | East Bengal (R) | Kolkata, West Bengal | 1 | 6 | 2 | 1 | 3 | 8 | 8 | 0 | 7 | 0 | 0 | 0 | 2022-23 |
| 87 | Mumbai United AC | Mumbai, Maharashtra | 1 | 6 | 2 | 1 | 3 | 8 | 9 | -1 | 7 | 0 | 0 | 0 | 2010 |
| 88 | RKM FA | Narayananpur, Chhattisgarh | 1 | 8 | 2 | 1 | 5 | 8 | 15 | -7 | 7 | 0 | 0 | 0 | 2022-23 |
| 89 | Titanium FC | Trivandrum, Kerala | 2 | 10 | 1 | 4 | 5 | 6 | 14 | -8 | 7 | 0 | 0 | 0 | 2009, 2010 |
| 90 | Kerala United FC | Malappuram, Kerala | 2 | 11 | 2 | 1 | 8 | 11 | 34 | -23 | 7 | 0 | 0 | 0 | 2012, 2021 |
| 91 | Mumbai City (R) | Mumbai, Maharashtra | 2 | 15 | 1 | 4 | 10 | 8 | 40 | -32 | 7 | 0 | 0 | 0 | 2020, 2022-23 |
| 92 | KLASA | Bishnupur, Manipur | 1 | 16 | 2 | 1 | 13 | 8 | 38 | -30 | 7 | 0 | 0 | 0 | 2024-25 |
| 93 | SBI Kerala | Trivandrum, Kerala | 2 | 10 | 2 | 0 | 8 | 10 | 19 | -9 | 6 | 0 | 0 | 0 | 2008, 2010 |
| 94 | AU Rajasthan FC | Jaipur, Rajasthan | 1 | 6 | 1 | 2 | 3 | 4 | 7 | -3 | 5 | 0 | 0 | 0 | 2020 |
| 95 | MYJ–GMSC | Mumbai, Maharashtra | 1 | 8 | 1 | 2 | 5 | 8 | 19 | -11 | 5 | 0 | 0 | 0 | 2025–26 |
| 96 | Madan Maharaj FC | Bhopal, Madhya Pradesh | 1 | 6 | 1 | 2 | 3 | 5 | 13 | -8 | 5 | 0 | 0 | 0 | 2021 |
| 97 | Kohima Komets | Kohima, Nagaland | 1 | 8 | 1 | 1 | 6 | 4 | 25 | -21 | 4 | 0 | 0 | 0 | 2013 |
| 98 | Ryntih FC | Shillong, Meghalaya | 1 | 3 | 1 | 0 | 2 | 4 | 4 | 0 | 3 | 0 | 0 | 0 | 2021 |
| 99 | United Chirang Duar | Chirang district, Assam | 1 | 3 | 1 | 0 | 2 | 4 | 12 | -8 | 3 | 0 | 0 | 0 | 2022-23 |
| 100 | Indian National FC | Delhi | 1 | 6 | 1 | 0 | 5 | 3 | 15 | -12 | 3 | 0 | 0 | 0 | 2010 |
| 101 | Denzong Boys | Gangtok, Sikkim | 2 | 12 | 0 | 3 | 9 | 10 | 35 | -25 | 3 | 0 | 0 | 0 | 2010, 2011 |
| 102 | Corbett FC | Rudrapur, Uttarakhand | 2 | 7 | 0 | 2 | 5 | 4 | 14 | -10 | 2 | 0 | 0 | 0 | 2021, 2022-23 |
| 103 | Bengal Mumbai FC | Mumbai, Maharashtra | 1 | 4 | 0 | 1 | 3 | 4 | 12 | -8 | 1 | 0 | 0 | 0 | 2009 |
| 104 | Pride Sports FC | Jabalpur, Madhya Pradesh | 1 | 6 | 0 | 0 | 6 | 2 | 16 | -14 | 0 | 0 | 0 | 0 | 2016–17 |
| 105 | BLG Diamond Rock | Balaghat, Madhya Pradesh | 1 | 6 | 0 | 0 | 6 | 3 | 18 | -15 | 0 | 0 | 0 | 0 | 2022-23 |
| 106 | MP United FC | Indore, Madhya Pradesh | 1 | 5 | 0 | 0 | 5 | 2 | 18 | -16 | 0 | 0 | 0 | 0 | 2014 |
| 107 | Madhya Bharat SC | Bhopal, Madhya Pradesh | 1 | 10 | 0 | 0 | 10 | 3 | 39 | -36 | 0 | 0 | 0 | 0 | 2017–18 |

=== Clubs promoted/relegated to I-League 2 ===
Promoted clubs from I-League 3 to I-League 2
| Season | Clubs |
|---|---|
| 2023–24 | Sporting Goa, Dempo, Sporting Bengaluru |
| 2024–25 | Diamond Harbour, Chanmari, SAT, KLASA |
| 2025–26 | Karbi Anglong Morning Star, MYJ–GMSC |

Relegated clubs from I-League to I-League 2
| Season | Clubs |
|---|---|
| 2007–08 | Viva Kerala, Salgaocar |
| 2008–09 | Mohammedan, Vasco |
| 2009–10 | Sporting Goa, Shillong Lajong |
| 2010–11 | JCT, ONGC |
| 2011–12 | Viva Kerala, HAL |
| 2012–13 | Air India, United Sikkim |
| 2013–14 | Mohammedan |
| 2014–15 | Dempo |
| 2015–16 | None (Note: Aizawl FC were relegated, but reinstated to I-League due to withdrawal of 3 Goan clubs.) |
| 2016–17 | Mumbai |
| 2017–18 | None (Note: Churchill Brothers S.C. were relegated, but reinstated to I-League after the appeal.) |
| 2018–19 | Shillong Lajong |
| 2019–20 | None (Note: Aizawl FC were relegated, but reinstated to I-League after inclusion of two I-League clubs to Indian Super League) |
| 2020–21 | None (Note: NEROCA FC were relegated but were reinstated by AIFF after viewing the situation of COVID-19 pandemic in India.) |
| 2021–22 | None (Note: Mumbai Kenkre FC were relegated but were reinstated after the closure of the Indian Arrows project.) |
| 2022–23 | Kenkre, Sudeva Delhi |
| 2023–24 | NEROCA, TRAU |
| 2024–25 | Sporting Bengaluru, Delhi |
| 2025–26 | Namdhari |

=== Clubs promoted/relegated from I-League 2 ===
Promoted clubs from I-League 2 to I-League
| Season | Clubs |
|---|---|
| 2008 | Mumbai, Mohammedan, United, Vasco |
| 2009 | Salgaocar, Viva Kerala, Shillong Lajong, Pune |
| 2010 | ONGC, HAL |
| 2011 | Shillong Lajong, Sporting Goa |
| 2012 | ONGC, United Sikkim |
| 2013 | Rangdajied United, Mohammedan |
| 2014 | Royal Wahingdoh |
| 2015 | Aizawl |
| 2015–16 | Dempo |
| 2016–17 | NEROCA |
| 2017–18 | Real Kashmir |
| 2018–19 | TRAU |
| 2020 | Mohammedan |
| 2021 | Rajasthan United, Kenkre |
| 2022–23 | Shillong Lajong, Delhi |
| 2023–24 | Sporting Bengaluru, Dempo |
| 2024–25 | Diamond Harbour, Chanmari |
| 2025–26 | Delhi, Bengaluru United |

Relegated clubs from I-League 2 to I-League 3
| Season | Clubs |
|---|---|
| 2023–24 | Kenkre, Maharashtra Oranje |
| 2024–25 | KLASA, TRAU |
| 2025–26 | NEROCA |

== Champions ==
I-League 2nd Division/I-League Qualifiers/I-League 2 champions
| Season | Champions | Runners-up | Third place | Teams |
|---|---|---|---|---|
| 2008 | Mumbai | Mohammedan | United | 6+6 |
| 2009 | Salgaocar | Viva Kerala | Shillong Lajong | 5+5+5 |
| 2010 | ONGC | HAL | Vasco | 7+7+7 |
| 2011 | Shillong Lajong | Sporting Goa | Vasco | 7+7+7 |
| 2012 | ONGC (2) | United Sikkim | Mohammedan | 8+8+7 |
| 2013 | Rangdajied United | Mohammedan | Bhawanipore | 9+9+8 |
| 2014 | Royal Wahingdoh | Bhawanipore | Kalighat MS | 6+5 |
| 2015 | Aizawl | Lonestar Kashmir | Chanmari | 8 |
| 2015–16 | Dempo | Minerva Punjab | NEROCA | 5+5 |
| 2016–17 | NEROCA | Southern Samity | Delhi United | 4+4 |
| 2017–18 | Real Kashmir | Hindustan | Ozone | 6+6+6 |
| 2018–19 | TRAU | Chhinga Veng | Ozone | 5+5+6 |
| 2020 | Mohammedan | Bhawanipore | Bengaluru United | 6+5+6 |
| 2021 | Rajasthan United | Kenkre | Delhi | 4+5 |
| 2022–23 | Delhi | Shillong Lajong | Ambernath United Atlanta | 17+4 |
| 2023–24 | Sporting Bengaluru | Dempo | Sudeva Delhi | 8 |
| 2024–25 | Diamond Harbour | Chanmari | Sporting Goa | 9 |
| 2025–26 | Delhi (2) | Bengaluru United | United | 9 |
Further information: Indian football champions

=== Performance by clubs ===
| Club | Titles | Runners-up | Third place | Winning seasons | Runners-up seasons | Third place seasons |
|---|---|---|---|---|---|---|
| Delhi | 2 | 0 | 1 | 2022–23, 2025–26 | | 2021 |
| ONGC | 2 | 0 | 0 | 2010, 2012 | | |
| Mohammedan | 1 | 2 | 1 | 2020 | 2008, 2013 | 2012 |
| Shillong Lajong | 1 | 1 | 1 | 2011 | 2022–23 | 2009 |
| Dempo | 1 | 1 | 0 | 2015–16 | 2023-24 | |
| NEROCA | 1 | 0 | 1 | 2016–17 | | 2015–16 |
| Mumbai | 1 | 0 | 0 | 2008 | | |
| Salgaocar | 1 | 0 | 0 | 2009 | | |
| Rangdajied United | 1 | 0 | 0 | 2013 | | |
| Royal Wahingdoh | 1 | 0 | 0 | 2014 | | |
| Aizawl | 1 | 0 | 0 | 2015 | | |
| Real Kashmir | 1 | 0 | 0 | 2017–18 | | |
| TRAU | 1 | 0 | 0 | 2018–19 | | |
| Rajasthan United | 1 | 0 | 0 | 2021 | | |
| Sporting Bengaluru | 1 | 0 | 0 | 2023–24 | | |
| Diamond Harbour | 1 | 0 | 0 | 2024–25 | | |
| Bhawanipore | 0 | 2 | 1 | | 2014, 2020 | 2013 |
| Sporting Goa | 0 | 1 | 1 | | 2011 | 2024–25 |
| Chanmari | 0 | 1 | 1 | | 2024–25 | 2015 |
| Bengaluru United | 0 | 1 | 1 | | 2025–26 | 2020 |
| Viva Kerala | 0 | 1 | 0 | | 2009 | |
| HAL | 0 | 1 | 0 | | 2010 | |
| United Sikkim | 0 | 1 | 0 | | 2012 | |
| Lonestar Kashmir | 0 | 1 | 0 | | 2015 | |
| Minerva Punjab | 0 | 1 | 0 | | 2015–16 | |
| Southern Samity | 0 | 1 | 0 | | 2016–17 | |
| Hindustan | 0 | 1 | 0 | | 2017–18 | |
| Chhinga Veng | 0 | 1 | 0 | | 2018–19 | |
| Mumbai Kenkre | 0 | 1 | 0 | | 2021 | |
| Vasco | 0 | 0 | 2 | | | 2010, 2011 |
| Ozone | 0 | 0 | 2 | | | 2017–18, 2018–19 |
| United | 0 | 0 | 2 | | | 2008, 2025–26 |
| Kalighat MS | 0 | 0 | 1 | | | 2014 |
| Delhi United | 0 | 0 | 1 | | | 2016–17 |
| Ambernath United Atlanta | 0 | 0 | 1 | | | 2022–23 |
| Sudeva Delhi | 0 | 0 | 1 | | | 2023–24 |

== Sponsorship and media coverage ==
=== Sponsorship ===
From 2008 to 2011 the league was sponsored by Oil and Natural Gas Corporation (ONGC) and was named the ONGC I-League 2nd Division. ONGC was also the title sponsor of the I-League. In October 2011 ONGC was dropped as a sponsor.

| Period | Title Sponsor | Tournament |
|---|---|---|
| 2008–2011 | ONGC | ONGC I-League 2nd Division |
| 2011–2017 | none | I-League 2nd Division |
| 2017–2023 | Hero MotoCorp | Hero I-League 2nd Division / I-League Qualifiers (2020) |
| 2023–present | none | I-League 2 |

=== Broadcasters ===
| Period | TV telecast | Online streaming |
|---|---|---|
| 2007–2010 | Zee Sports | |
| 2010–2017 | Ten Action, Ten Sports | DittoTV |
| 2017–2019 | JioTV | |
| 2019–2022 | 1Sports | Facebook, JioTV |
| 2022–2024 | | YouTube |
| 2024-2025 | | SSEN |
| 2025-Present | | Youtube |

== Winning coaches ==
| Head coach | Club | Wins | Winning years |
|---|---|---|---|
| (India) L. Nandakumar Singh | Royal Wahingdoh, TRAU | 2 | 2014, 2018–19 |
| (England) Dave Booth | Mumbai | 1 | 2008 |
| (India) Peter Vales | Salgaocar | 1 | 2009 |
| (India) Caetano Pinho | ONGC | 1 | 2010 |
| (Scotland) Pradhyum Reddy | Shillong Lajong | 1 | 2011 |
| (India) Santosh Kashyap | ONGC | 1 | 2012–13 |
| (India) Karsing Kurbah | Rangdajied United | 1 | 2013–14 |
| (India) Hmingthana Zadeng | Aizawl | 1 | 2014–15 |
| (India) Mauricio Afonso | Dempo | 1 | 2015–16 |
| (India) Gift Raikhan | NEROCA | 1 | 2016–17 |
| (Scotland) David Robertson | Real Kashmir | 1 | 2017–18 |
| (India) Yan Law (sacked midway) | Mohammedan SC | 1 | 2020 |
| (India) Vikrant Sharma | Rajasthan United | 1 | 2021 |
| (India) Surinder Singh | Delhi FC | 1 | 2022-23 |
| (India) Chinta Chandrashekar Rao | SC Bengaluru | 1 | 2023-24 |
| (Spain) Kibu Vicuña | Diamond Harbour | 1 | 2024-25 |

== Top scorers ==
| Season | Top scorer | Club | Goals |
|---|---|---|---|
| 2008 | (Nigeria) Fredrick Okwagbe | HAL | 6 |
| 2009 | (Nigeria) Badmus Babatunde | Viva Kerala | 6 |
| 2010 | (Nigeria) Badmus Babatunde | ONGC | 4 |
| 2010 | (India) Joy Ferrao | Vasco | 4 |
| 2011 | (Nigeria) Stanley Okoroigwe | Techno Aryan | 6 |
| 2012 | (Nigeria) Daniel Bedemi | United Sikkim | 11 |
| 2013 | (Nigeria) Badmus Babatunde | Rangdajied United | 8 |
| 2013 | (Brazil) Hudson Lima Da Silva | Bhawanipore | 8 |
| 2014 | (Nigeria) Daniel Bedemi | Bhawanipore | 8 |
| 2015 | (India) Ajay Singh | Mohammedan | 11 |
| 2015–16 | (Nigeria) Felix Chidi Odili | Dempo | 7 |
| 2015–16 | (India) Atinder Mani | Lonestar Kashmir | 7 |
| 2016–17 | (Nigeria) Odafa Okolie | Southern Samity | 9 |
| 2016–17 | (Nigeria) Felix Chidi Odili | NEROCA | 9 |
| 2017–18 | (Brazil) Robert de Souza Ribiero | Ozone | 10 |
| 2018–19 | (Ghana) Phillip Adjah | Mohammedan | 10 |
| 2018–19 | (Nigeria) Princewill Emeka | TRAU | 10 |
| 2020 | (India) Syed Shoaib Ahmed | ARA | 7 |
| 2020 | (Nigeria) Ekombong Victor Philip | Garhwal | 7 |
| 2021 | (India) Anwar Ali Jr. | Delhi FC | 4 |
| 2022–23 | (India) Irfan Yadwad | Bengaluru United | 13 |
| 2023–24 | (India) Thomyo L Shimray | Sporting Bengaluru | 11 |
| 2023–24 | (India) Sahil Harijan | United SC | 11 |
| 2024-25 | (India) Akshunna Tyagi | Bengaluru United | 8 |
| 2025-26 | (India) Himanshu Jangra | Delhi | 13 |

== Awards ==
=== Prize money ===
As updated on 19 May 2023:

| Champions | ₹ 70 lakhs |
| Runners-up | ₹ 50 lakhs |
| Match winner | ₹ 50,000 |
| Hero of the match | ₹ 20,000 |

== See also ==
- Football in India
- History of Indian football
- List of football clubs in India
- NFL Second Division
- NFL Third Division
- Santosh Trophy
- Hero MotoCorp
