= 2009 I-League 2nd Division =

2nd season of the I-League 2nd Division

I-League 2nd Division
- Season: 2008–09
- Champions: Salgaocar
- Promoted: Salgaocar; Viva Kerala; Shillong Lajong; Pune
- Matches: 45 (30 Group Stage; 15 Final Round)
- Goals: 117 (2.6 per match) (80 Group Stage; 37 Final Round)

The 2009 I-League 2nd Division season ran from February 2009 to 19 April 2009. Initially 15 teams were divided in three groups of five teams and then the top two teams in each group were advanced to final round of qualification.

Four teams were promoted to I-league 2010 season. Promoted teams include Salgaocar, Viva Kerala, Shillong Lajong and Pune.

== Group A ==
Pos	Team	Pld	W	D	L	GF	GA	GD	Pts	Qualification or relegation
1	ONGC (A)	4	3	0	1	8	4	+4	9	Advance to Final Round
2	Shillong Lajong (A)	4	2	2	0	7	5	+2	8	Advance to Final Round
3	Oil India	4	1	2	1	6	5	+1	5	
4	George Telegraph	4	1	1	2	6	5	+1	4	
5	Bengal Mumbai	4	0	1	3	4	12	−8	1	

Source: Soccerway
(A) Advance to a further round

== Group B ==
Pos	Team	Pld	W	D	L	GF	GA	GD	Pts	Qualification or relegation
1	SESA (A)	4	3	1	0	10	1	+9	10	Advance to Final Round
2	Pune (A)	4	2	2	0	2	0	+2	8	Advance to Final Round
3	New Delhi Heroes	4	1	2	1	6	6	0	5	
4	Simla Youngs	4	0	2	2	3	11	−8	2	
5	Amity United	4	0	1	3	5	8	−3	1	

Source: Soccerway
(A) Advance to a further round

== Group C ==
Pos	Team	Pld	W	D	L	GF	GA	GD	Pts	Qualification or relegation
1	Salgaocar (A)	4	3	1	0	6	2	+4	10	Advance to Final Round
2	Viva Kerala (A)	4	2	2	0	10	3	+7	8	Advance to Final Round
3	Chandni	4	1	1	2	2	5	−3	4	
4	Malabar United	4	1	1	2	3	7	−4	4	
5	Travancore Titanium	4	0	1	3	2	6	−4	1	

Source: Soccerway
(A) Advance to a further round

== Final round ==
Pos	Team	Pld	W	D	L	GF	GA	GD	Pts	Qualification or relegation
1	Salgaocar (C, P)	5	3	1	1	6	3	+3	10	Promoted to 2009–10 I-League
2	Viva Kerala (P)	5	3	0	2	11	7	+4	9	Promoted to 2009–10 I-League
3	Shillong Lajong (P)	5	3	0	2	7	4	+3	9	Promoted to 2009–10 I-League
4	Pune (P)	5	3	0	2	7	6	+1	9	Promoted to 2009–10 I-League
5	ONGC	5	2	1	2	4	5	−1	7	
6	SESA	5	0	0	5	2	12	−10	0	

Source: Soccerway
(C) Champions; (P) Promoted
