= Amity Indian National FC =

Indian association football club

Amity Indian National
- Full name: Amity Indian National Football Club
- Nickname: The National
- Short name: AINFC
- Founded: 1939; 87 years ago
- Ground: Various
- League: Delhi Premier League
Home colours	Away colours

Amity Indian National FC is an Indian professional football club based in New Delhi, that currently competes in the Delhi Premier League.

== History ==
The club was founded in 1939. It won the Delhi Football League 5 times in its history. After winning DSA Senior Division in 1999 and 2000, they participated in the National Football League Second Division (India). In 2008 Amity United acquired the club. In 2010 I-League 2nd Division, the club participated in the tournament.

== Honours ==
=== League ===
- Delhi Football League
  - Champions: 5

=== Other ===
- Lal Bahadur Shastri Cup
  - Champions (1): 1992
- Independence Day Cup
  - Champions (1): 2000
- Delhi Lt. Governor's Cup
  - Runners-up (2): 2006, 2007

== See also ==
- List of football clubs in India
