= Hindustan Aeronautics Limited SC =

Indian association football club based in Bangalore

HAL
- Full name: Hindustan Aeronautics Limited Sporting Club
- Nickname: The Pilots
- Short name: HAL, HASC
- Founded: 1950; 76 years ago (originally founded); 2006; 20 years ago (revived)
- Ground: Bangalore Football Stadium
- Capacity: 8,400
- Owner: Hindustan Aeronautics Limited
- League: Karnataka Super Division; I-League 3
Home colours	Away colours

Hindustan Aeronautics Limited Sporting Club (often abbreviated as HAL or HASC) is an Indian institutional multi-sports club based in Bangalore, best known for its football team. It was named after the company Hindustan Aeronautics Limited (HAL). The club has competed in the top tiers of Karnataka football — the Bangalore A Division and the Karnataka Super Division.

As one of the top clubs from Karnataka, they have also competed in the National Football League till 2007, and subsequently the I-League, then top tier of Indian football league system.

The club was originally founded in 1950s, with having hockey, football and other sections. They were revived in 2006. Nicknamed "the pilots", HAL used Bangalore Football Stadium as their home ground. In 2014, following poor performance in 2013–14 season, the club announced "temporary shutting down activities".

== History ==
=== Formation and journey ===
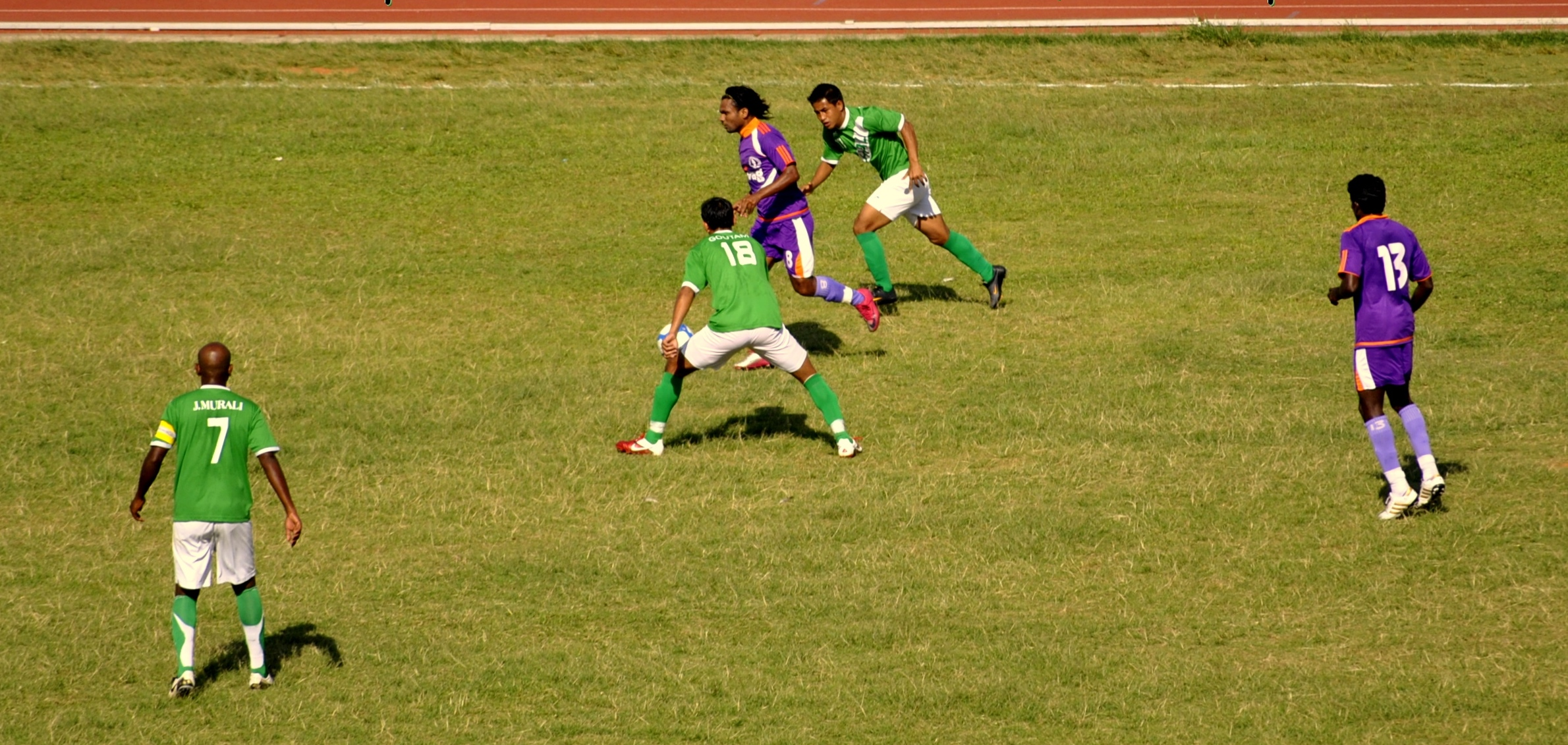
HAL SC players (in green) in action against Prayag United during the 2010–11 I-League

Originally founded in the 1950s, the club later became affiliated with Bangalore District Football Association (BDFA) in the 90s. In 1952, the club clinched prestigious Stafford Challenge Cup title. Hindustan Aeronautics Limited Sports Club began their journey through participating in the Bangalore A Division league, in which they emerged champions in 2000. Before getting revived in 2006, they clinched the BDFA Super Division titles in 2001, 2002, 2004 and 2005. HAL took part in the 2001–02 NFL season.

=== 2006–2010 ===
After finishing third in the NFL Second Division in 2006, HASC were promoted to the Premier Division. Although only the top two teams from the Second Division gain promotion, Tata Football Academy who finished first in the standings were not able to form a professional team for the Premier Division. Therefore, HASC were promoted to the 11th NFL Premier Division along with runners up Churchill Brothers.

In 2010, the club emerged as the runners-up of the 2010 I-League 2nd Division after the end of final round, hosted in Bengaluru. With 16 points in 7 matches, HAL finished on 2nd as ONGC FC clinched title.

=== 2010–present ===
HASC qualified for 2010–11 I-League season after finishing second in the 2010 I-League 2nd Division. They were the second South Indian team in I-League after Viva Kerala. In the last match of the season, they defeated defending champions Dempo 4–2 to starve off relegation to I-League 2nd Division, with Xavier Vijay Kumar scoring two goals. HAL later clinched the 2012–13 Bengaluru Super Division title.

In the 2013–14 edition of the BDFA Super Division, HASC finished eighth among nine teams. This prompted the club to shut down their activities "temporarily" in December 2014. The coach H. Chnadrashekhar said, "We will not field a team temporarily (in the Cups and the league) and to that effect HASC's management had sent a letter to BDFA secretary ST Bhoopal." Reports of the club resuming operations and fielding their team emerged after they held selection trials in 2019.

In the 2023–24 season of BDFA Super Division League, HAL secured fourth-place finish.

== Home ground ==
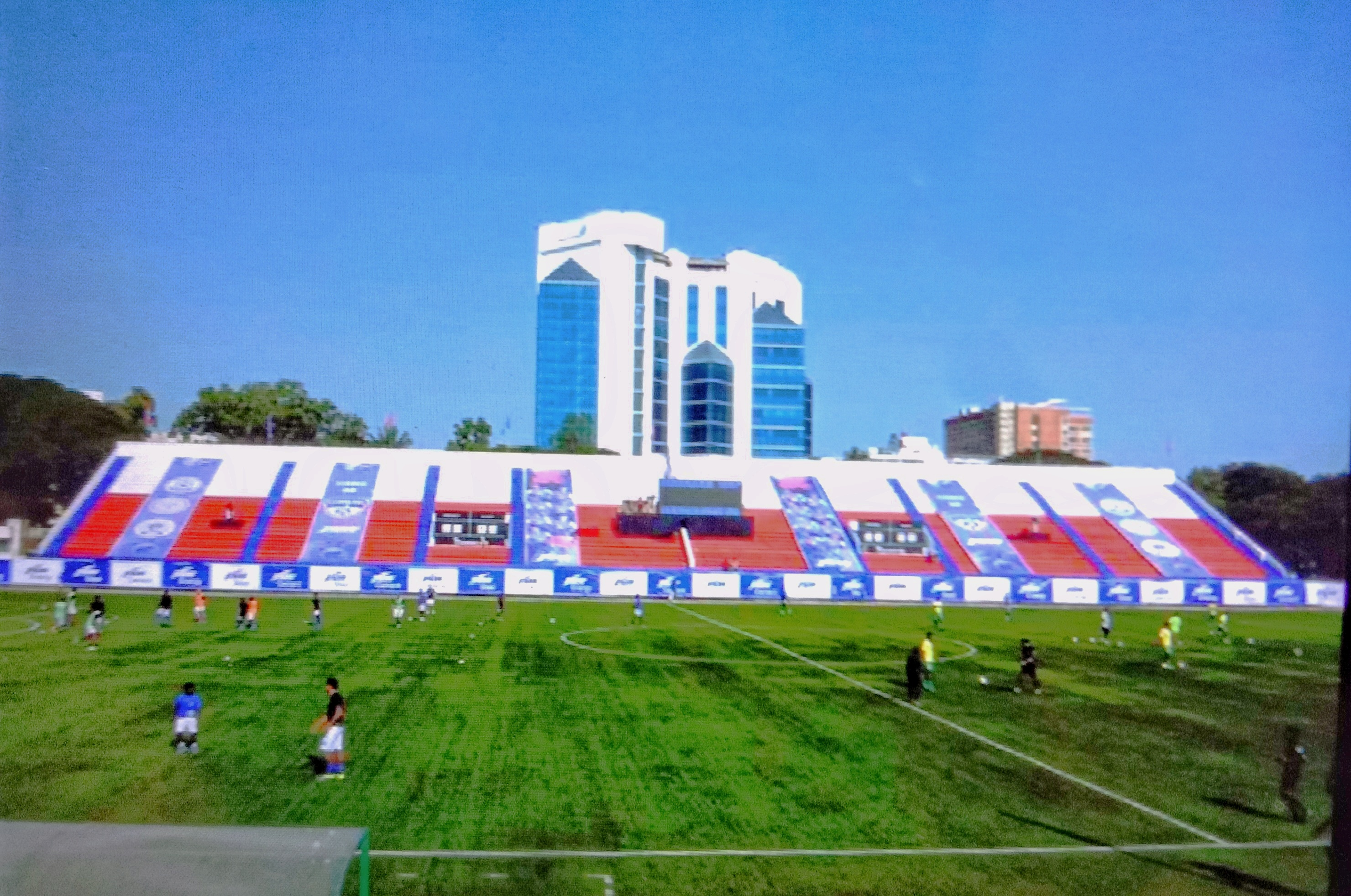
Bangalore Football Stadium

HASC used the Bangalore Football Stadium as its home ground for domestic and regional league matches since 2006, which previously had a capacity of 45,000 spectators. Built in 1967, the stadium has artificial turf and currently has a capacity of 8,400.

Club's training facilities are situated at the HAL Sports Club Ground in Bengaluru, which is used for selection trials of their youth teams, alongside state youth competitions.

== Ownership and finances ==
The ownership of HASC has been from Hindustan Aeronautics Limited (HAL). The company HAL were not so influential when running the club at first, as shown from their poor record before the 2010 I-League 2nd Division season in which the club achieved promotion.

== Notable players ==
The following HAL players have been capped at senior/youth international level, with their respective countries. Years in brackets indicate their spells at the club.

- (Rwanda) Jimmy Mulisa (2001–2002)
- (Kyrgyzstan) Raja Baliev Nurlan (2001–2002)
- (Kyrgyzstan) Ruslan Sydykov (2001–2002; 2002–2003)
- (Liberia) Philip Tarlue (2004)
- (Nepal) Rohit Chand (2010–2012)
- (Serbia) Aleksandar Šujdović (2011–2012)

== Seasons ==
- P = Played
- W = Games won
- D = Games drawn
- L = Games lost
- F = Goals for
- A = Goals against
- Pts = Points
- Pos = Final position
- IL = I-League
- IL2 = I-League 2nd Division
- DNP = Did not play
- F = Final
- Group = Group stage
- R16 = Round of 16
- QF = Quarter-finals
- R1 = Round 1
- R2 = Round 2
- R3 = Round 3
- R4 = Round 4
- R5 = Round 5
- R6 = Round 6
- SF = Semi-finals

1st or W	Winners
2nd or RU	Runners-up
↑	Promoted
↓	Relegated
♦	Top scorer in division

Results of league and cup competitions by season
Season	Division	P	W	D	L	F	A	Pts	Pos	Federation Cup	Super Cup	Asia	Round reached	Name	Goals
Season	League									Federation Cup	Super Cup	Asia	Round reached	Top goalscorer	
2005–06	Div 2	—	—	—	—	—	—	—	—	—	—	—	—	—	—
2006–07	Div 1	18	2	4	12	12	32	10	10th	—	—	—	—	—	—
2008	IL2	5	2	0	3	11	9	6	10th	—	—	—	—	—	—
2009	DNP	—	—	—	—	—	—	—	—	—	—	—	—	—	—
2010	IL2	12	7	4	1	25	10	25	2nd	—	—	—	—	—	—
2010–11	IL	26	6	6	14	18	40	24	12th	GS	—	—	—	Xavier Vijay Kumar	8

== Honours ==
=== League ===
- National Football League II
  - Champions (1): 2000–01
  - Third place (1): 2005–06
- I-League 2nd Division
  - Runners-up (1): 2010
- BDFA Super Division/Bangalore Football League
  - Champions (9): 1984, 1990, 2000, 2001, 2002, 2004, 2005–06, 2007–08, 2008–09, 2012–13
  - Runners-up (1): 2011–12
- Bangalore B Division
  - Champions (1): 2020–21

=== Cup ===
- Stafford Challenge Cup
  - Champions (1): 1952
- Sait Nagjee Football Tournament
  - Champions (3): 1952, 1953, 1954
- Puttiah Memorial Trophy
  - Champions (6): 1977, 2001, 2002, 2003, 2004, 2008
- Gadhinglaj Cup
  - Runners-up (1): 2016
- ONGC Invitational Trophy
  - Runners-up (1): 2016

== Other departments ==
=== Field hockey ===
The club has its hockey team, that competed in Beighton Cup (one of the oldest field hockey tournaments in the world). Then known as Hindustan Aircraft, they lifted the trophy in 1951, and finished as runners-up in 1952.

Honours

- Beighton Cup
  - Champions (1): 1951
  - Runners-up (1): 1952
- Aga Khan Gold Cup
  - Runners-up (1): 1949

=== Academy and youth football ===
Club's youth/academy team (colts) participated in I-League U19.

== See also ==
- List of football clubs in India
