= Travancore Titanium FC =

Former Indian association football club based in Thiruvananthapuram

Travancore Titanium ടൈടാനിയം എഫ്.സി.
- Full name: Travancore Titanium Football Club
- Founded: 1973
- Owner: Travancore Titanium Products
- League: Kerala Premier League
- 2015: Group stage

Travancore Titanium Football Club (later known as Titanium Trivandrum FC) was a professional football club based in Travancore, Kerala (present day Thiruvananthapuram). It participated in Kerala Premier League, Kerala State Club Football Championship and I-League 2nd Division.

== History ==
During the 1970s, Titanium was one of the most acclaimed football clubs in Kerala. Players like B. Sasikumaran Pillai, Sankarankutty, Abdul Hameed, Najumuddin, Thomas Sebastian, Abdul Rasheed Kariyambath, V. Jayakumar, Ebin Rose, Shahjahan, Shaukath, Martin, Shabeer and Usman were members of Titanium Football team.

== Honors ==
- Kerala Football League: (silver) Runners-up (1): 2000–01
- Kerala State Club Football Championship: (gold) Champions (10): 1973, 1978, 1989, 1990, 1992, 1993, 1994, 2000, 2004, 2005

(silver) Runners-up (8): 1976, 1984, 1985, 1986, 1988, 1995, 2002, 2008

- Sait Nagjee Football Tournament

(silver) Runners-up (3): 1973, 1978, 1992

- Tirur All-India Football Tournament
  - Runners-up (1): 2006
