= 2008 I-League 2nd Division =

1st season of the I-League 2nd Division

I-League 2nd Division
- Season: 2007–08
- Champions: Mumbai
- Promoted: Mumbai; Mohammedan; Chirag United; Vasco

The draw of the preliminary groups of the inaugural 2008 I-League 2nd Division was carried out at Football House, Dwarka on 25 February 2008. The 12 participating teams have been drawn into two groups of six teams each to be played in Balewadi Sports Complex Pune and Rajarshi Shahu Stadium Kolhapur. The final round was played in Guwahati, Assam.

The top four teams in the I-League 2nd Division qualified for the I-League (2008–09), while the rest will be remain to I League Division 2 in the next season. Mumbai were the champions of the inaugural I-League 2nd Division.

The AIFF had selected Pune and Kolhapur as preliminary round venues to take the game to different cities.

== Standings ==
=== Group A ===
Last updated: 29 February 2008

P	Team	Pld	W	D	L	GF	GA	GD	Pts
1	Chirag United	5	4	1	0	09	04	+5	13
2	Vasco	5	3	1	1	06	04	+2	10
3	Pune	5	2	1	2	08	06	+2	07
4	HAL	5	2	0	3	11	09	+2	06
5	ONGC	5	1	3	1	04	04	0	06
6	SBT	5	0	0	5	01	12	-11	00

Advanced to next round

=== Group B ===
Last updated: 29 February 2008

All the match of this Group will be play in Kolhapur

P	Team	Pld	W	D	L	GF	GA	GD	Pts
1	Mumbai	5	4	0	1	12	04	+8	12
2	Mohammedan Sporting	5	4	0	1	08	04	+4	12
3	Indian Bank Chennai	5	3	0	2	07	07	0	09
4	Amity United	5	2	1	2	07	09	-2	07
5	Oil India	5	0	2	3	05	09	-4	02
6	New Delhi Heroes	5	0	1	4	05	11	-6	01

Advanced to next round

== Results ==
=== Group A ===
Last updated: 13 April 2008

The home team is listed in the left-hand column.

Home \ Away	CHI	HAL	ONG	PUN	SBT	VAS
Chirag United	—			2–0	1–0	
HAL	2–3	—	3–2	1–2	4–0	1–2
ONGC	0–0		—		1–0	
Pune			1–1	—		0–1
SBT				1–5	—	0–1
Vasco	3–2		0–0			—

Source: International Soccerway
Legend: Blue = home team win; Yellow = draw; Red = away team win.

=== Group B ===
Last updated: 29 February 2008

The home team is listed in the left-hand column.

Home \ Away	AMI	IBC	MOH	MUM	NDE	OIN
Amity United	—			0–1		1–1
Indian Bank	1–3	—			2–1	
Mohammedan	2–0	0–2	—	2–1	3–1	1–0
Mumbai		3–0		—	1–0	
New Delhi	1–3				—	2–2
Oil India		1–0		2–3		—

Source: International Soccerway
Legend: Blue = home team win; Yellow = draw; Red = away team win.

== Final round ==
Pos	Team	Pld	W	D	L	GF	GA	GD	Pts	Qualification or relegation
1	Mumbai (P)	5	4	1	0	6	1	+5	13	Promoted to 2008–09 I-League
2	Mohammedan Sporting (P)	5	3	1	1	9	4	+5	10	Promoted to 2008–09 I-League
3	Chirag United (P)	5	3	1	1	7	4	+3	10	Promoted to 2008–09 I-League
4	Vasco (P)	5	2	1	2	8	10	−2	7	Promoted to 2008–09 I-League
5	Pune	5	1	0	4	9	12	−3	3	
6	Indian Bank Chennai	5	0	0	5	2	10	−8	0	

Source: Soccerway
(P) Promoted
