= Vasco SC =

Indian association football club based in Goa

Vasco
- Full name: Clube de Desportos Vasco da Gama
- Nickname: The Port Towners
- Short name: VSC; CDVG
- Founded: 1 September 1951; 75 years ago
- Ground: Jawaharlal Nehru Stadium
- Capacity: 19,000
- Owner: Vasco Sports Club Pvt. Ltd.
- Chairman: Nitin Bandekar
- League: Goa Professional League
- Website: vascosportsclub.com
Home colours	Away colours

Vasco Sports Club, founded as Clube de Desportos Vasco da Gama (Portuguese pronunciation: [ˈklubi dɨ dɨʃˈpoɾtuʃ ˈvaʃku dɐ ˈɡɐmɐ]; English: Vasco da Gama Sports Club), commonly referred to as Vasco da Gama or simply Vasco, is an Indian professional football club based in Vasco da Gama, Goa, part of the same named multi-sports club. Incorporated in 1951, the club is nicknamed "The Port Towners", and competes in the Goa Professional League.

Vasco is the first Goan club run under public shareholding. It previously competed in the National Football League, then highest division of Indian football league system. The club also appeared in the I-League 2nd Division in later years.

== History ==
=== Formation ===
In 1951, residents from the port town of Vasco da Gama, Goa, including the Portuguese garrison stationed there, formed the club called Clube de Desportos Vasco da Gama. Tenente Avila became first president of the club. On 1 September of that year, the club earned certification; they became affiliated to the Associação de Futebol de Goa (GFA) in 1959. It was named after the famous Brazilian club Club de Regatas Vasco da Gama, and similar colours were adopted by it. The open fields where the present Tilak Maidan Stadium and were the practice grounds for the players. Later a club house was built nearby, which still stands today.

=== Early years ===
During the last five decades the club participated in most of the major tournaments in India. The sixties and seventies were the most productive years for the club as they won some of the major tournaments during that time (Kerala Trophy, Stafford Cup, Chakola Gold Trophy and Sait-Nagjee Trophy). In 1968, it won the first edition of Goa Police Cup, and in 1969, it became the first Goan side to win Sait Nagjee Football Tournament defeating Border Security Force FC. It failed to win in other tournaments including Rovers Cup, Bordoloi Trophy and Nehru Memorial Tournament, having lost out in the several finals. In 1970, Vasco again became the first Goan side to win prestigious Bandodkar Gold Trophy, defeating Dempo 1–0. During the late-60s and early-70s, Vasco was noted for having famous "A–B–C–D of Indian football", players Andrew D'Souza, Bernard Pereira, Catao Fernandes, and Dominic Pereira. As far as honors at home go, the club won the Goa Professional League title on six occasions starting in 1954 until 1969 and is the oldest registered club still participating in the state's top league competition. Vasco also became first Goan club to have won a tournament in Bombay, the WIFA Championship in 1966.

After two decades of major victories, the 1980s saw a decline in the efficacy of the club in terms of all Indian and state tournaments. However, it retained a prominent position among the top five clubs in Goa. The decline started when Bandekar group withdrew support and there were no new investors to fund the increasing cost of top class players. From 1973 to 1975, Vasco was managed by legendary Indian goalkeeper Peter Thangaraj, and renowned goalkeeper E.N. Sudhir played for the club. Noted Indian manager T. K. Chathunni also appeared with Vasco in the 1970s. The club clinched Stafford Challenge Cup title in 1973. Over the last five decades, the club has received a lot of financial help from many philanthropic individuals not only from Goa, but also Goans residing abroad.

=== Present years ===
Undaunted, from the mid-1990s, under the leadership of Nõel da Lima Leitão, the club appointed former S.L. Benfica star Zeca Miglietti as coach for its training programme. His hard work saw the club reach the quarterfinal phase of the KBL Federation Cup and among the contenders for qualification to the Premier Division National League. British coach Bob Bootland took charge of the club in mid-90s and worked until 1998.

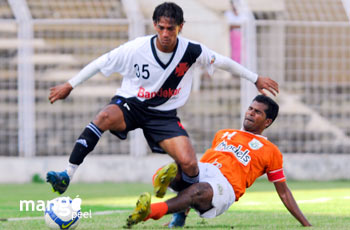
Wilton Gomes of Sporting Clube de Goa tackles Lester Fernandes of Vasco SC during a 2008–09 I-League match at Fatorda Stadium

For several years, Vasco emerged as one of the strongest sides in Goan football and they are well known for signing some quality foreigners. Signing players form Uzbekistan by them were one of the hot topics as they roped in some players including Yorqin Nazarov, Anvar Jabborov, Ravshan Teshabaev, Azamat Abduraimov, Sherzod Nazarov, Kashimov Awazbek. Vasco has participated in the National Football League II for several times, and in the 1999–00 season they emerged as runners-up. In the 2001–02 NFL season, the club secured third place, in which Vasco striker Rui Wanderley Weis scored 12 goals. In the 2002–03 National Football League, Vasco finished third on league table and they thrashed HAL SC 8–0, making it the biggest ever win for the club on margin. In September 2000, they reached final of Tirur All-India Football Tournament in Tirur, Kerala, but finished as runners-up, losing 5–4 to Indian Bank Recreational Club. The club took part in E. K. Nayanar Memorial Gold Cup in 2007 and faced Pakistan XI and Ghanaian side Nania in group stages.

Vasco debuted in the I-League during the 2008–09 season, but finished bottom of the table with 10 points in 22 matches. Vasco last competed in the top flight of domestic football during the 2009–10 season. In the 2010 I-League 2nd Division, Vasco entered into the final round, achieving third place with 13 points from 7 matches. In 2012, Serbian manager Davor Beber was appointed head coach. For the first time in history, Vasco got relegated from Goa Professional League in 2012–13 Goa Professional League season. In August 2018, they roped in former India international Micky Fernandes as their new head coach.

In the 2020–21 season, Goa Football Association held the qualifying tournament through Goa Professional League. After no interest from winners and runners-up, Vasco requested to the state association for nomination for the 2021–22 I-League 2nd Division.

== Sponsorship ==
In 2020, Vasco brought a new title sponsor in the local NRB Group, thus the team became known officially as NRB Vasco. The sponsorship was announced in Goan Club House. The team was formerly sponsored by Chowgule Group. The initial deal was of one-year duration which was announced by the NRB managing director Narayan Bandekar, who hope to help the club qualify for the I-League after years in the 2nd Division.

Vasco SC president Nitin Bandekar and vice-president Vinod Parkot with local Vasco MLA and KYC Chairman Carlos Almeida, Vasco SC CEO Ajay Patil, former club president Vinod Parkot, the ex-Goa FA secretary Savio Messias and Nayan Tara Lima Leitao were attended during the press meeting to let everyone about the sponsorship for the betterment of the management of the club.

== Stadium ==
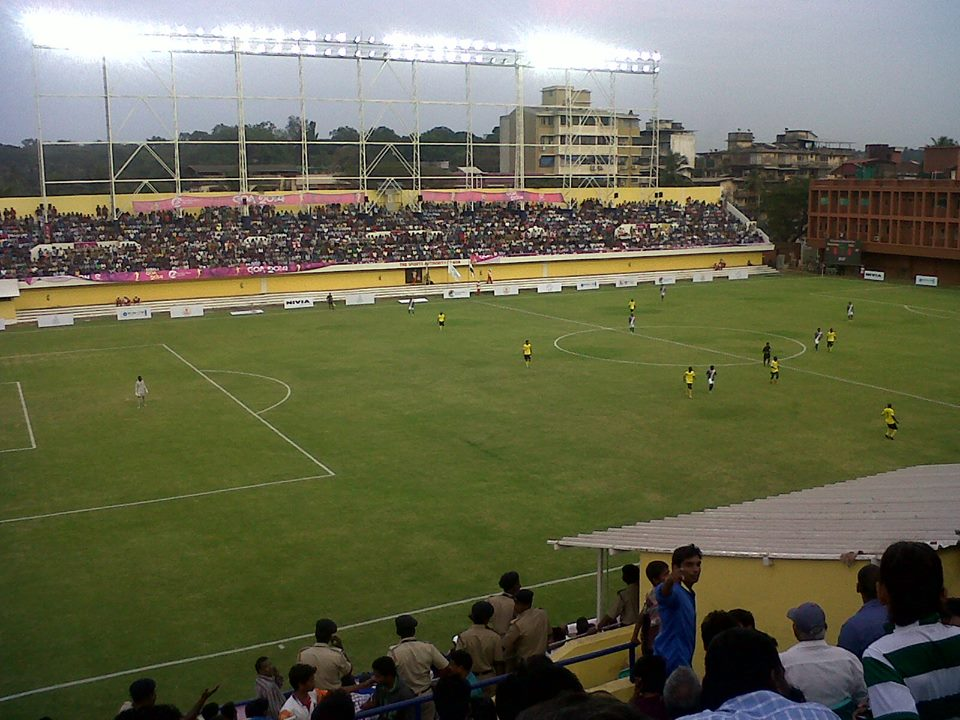
Tilak Maidan Stadium on a matchday

Vasco S.C. used Tilak Maidan Stadium for their home matches of the National Football League, the I-League 2nd Division and the Goa Professional League. They also use Duler Stadium for some of their home games.

== Rivalry ==
Vasco used to have rivalries with its fellow Goa-based clubs including Dempo S.C. and Churchill Brothers in regional leagues. With another Goan club Salgaocar, they participate in "Vasco derby".

== Current squad ==
Note: Flags indicate national team as defined under FIFA eligibility rules; some limited exceptions apply. Players may hold more than one non-FIFA nationality.

No.	Pos.	Nation	Player
4	DF	IND	Kuldeep Kumar
7	MF	IND	Desmon Gama
8	MF	IND	Denil Rebello
10	FW	IND	Suraj Mondal
11	MF	IND	Hafiz Ur Rehman
14	MF	IND	Anil Gaonkar (Captain)
17	DF	IND	Sanwil D'Costa
30	MF	IND	Francisco Fernandes
77	GK	IND	Sanju Thapa

No.	Pos.	Nation	Player
—	GK	IND	Clarence Furtado
—	DF	IND	Pidroy Carvalho
—	DF	IND	Neville Albuquerque
—	DF	IND	Alson Fernandes
—	DF	IND	Beckham Xavier
—	DF	IND	Karan Shirodkar
—	MF	IND	Altaf Navaloor
—	MF	IND	S. Udhaya Kumar
—	MF	IND	Mcleish Pereira
—	FW	IND	Mathew Colaco
—	FW	IND	Sheldon Pereira

== Managerial history ==
Note: The following list may not be complete

- (India) Peter Thangaraj (1973–1975)
- (England) Bob Bootland (1995–1998)
- (Portugal) José "Zeca" Marques (1998–1999)
- (India) Socorro Coutinho (1999–2000)
- (India) Derrick Pereira (2000–2005)
- (India) Mathew D'Costa (2005–2006)
- (India) Mridul Banerjee (2006)
- (India) Shabbir Ali (2006–2007)
- (India) Norbert Gonsales (2007)
- (India) Roberto Fernandes (2007–2008)
- (India) Subrata Bhattacharya (2009)
- (United States) Richard Sanchez (2012)
- (Serbia) Davor Berber (2012–2013)
- (India) Subrata Bhattacharya (2013–2014)
- (India) Micky Fernandes (2018–2022)

== Notable players ==
The following Vasco SC players have been capped at full international level, with their respective countries. Years in brackets indicate their spells at the club.

Foreign internationals

- (Sri Lanka) Mohamed Nizam Packeer Ally (1980)
- (Macau) José Maria da Cruz Martins (1997–1998)
- (Uzbekistan) Anvar Jabborov (1997–1998)
- (Tajikistan) (Uzbekistan) Rustam Zabirov (2000–2001)
- (Kenya) Harold Onyango (2003–2004)
- (Uzbekistan) Ravshan Teshabaev (2008–2009)
- (Uzbekistan) Yorqin Nazarov (2008–2009)
- (Uzbekistan) Sherzod Nazarov (2008–2009)
- (Nigeria) Julius Akpele (2009–2010)
- (Ghana) Stephen Offei (2013–2014)
- (Liberia) Varney Kallon (2015–2016)

Indian internationals

- (India) Sukhwinder Singh (2002–2003)
- (India) Selwyn Fernandes (2002–2004)
- (India) Krishnan Nair Ajayan (2003–2005)
- (India) Vinu Jose (2004–2005)
- (India) Anthony Pereira (2005–2006)
- (India) Francis Fernandes (2005–2006)
- (India) Fulganco Cardozo (2007–2009)
- (India) Lester Fernandez (2008–2009)

== Honours ==
=== League ===
- National Football League
  - Third place (3): 2001–02, 2002–03
- National Football League II
  - Runners-up (1): 1999–00
- I-League 2nd Division
  - Runners-up (1): 2008
  - Third place (2): 2010, 2011
- Goa Football League
  - Champions (6): 1953–54, 1955–56, 1958–59, 1964–65, 1966–67, 1968–69

=== Cup ===
- Sait Nagjee Trophy
  - Champions (1): 1969
- Rovers Cup
  - Runners-up (2): 1966–67, 1971–72
- Goa Police Cup
  - Champions (4): 1968, 1969, 1977, 2010
- Bordoloi Trophy
  - Runners-up (1): 1974
- Bandodkar Gold Trophy
  - Champions (2): 1971, 1975
  - Runners-up (1): 1981

=== Others ===
- Stafford Challenge Cup
  - Champions (1): 1973
- WIFA Championship
  - Champions (1): 1966
- Kerala Trophy
  - Champions (2): 1968, 1969
- KFA Shield
  - Champions (1): 1973
- Chakola Gold Trophy
  - Champions (1): 1973
- Guru Gobind Singh Trophy
  - Champions (1): 1999
- Goa Governor's Cup
  - Champions (1): 2004
  - Runners-up (1): 2000
- Mammen Mappillai Trophy
  - Champions (1): 1976 (joint winners)
  - Runners-up (1): 1979
- Oil India Gold Cup
  - Champions (1): 2007
- Mini Rovers Cup
  - Champions (1): 1993
- Nagaradakshya United Cup
  - Champions (1): 2018
- Tirur All-India Football Tournament
  - Runners-up (1): 2000
- Puttiah Memorial Trophy
  - Runners-up (1): 1978
- Abhijit Kadam Memorial Cup
  - Runners-up (1): 2008
- Kalinga Cup
  - Runners-up (1): 2012

=== Award ===
- IndianFootball.com Awards — Team of the Year: 2003

== Vasco youth ==
Vasco has its youth men's teams, which are participating in both regional and nationwide youth tournaments. Club's U-19 team took part in the I-League U19, while U-20 team competes in Taça Goa U-20 Football League. They also operated its U-15 team, which was included in Manchester United Premier Cup of India for 2006–07 season.

== See also ==
- List of Goan State Football Champions
- List of football clubs in Goa
- Vasco da Gama – Portuguese explorer (c. 1460s – 1524)
