= Denzong Boys FC =

Former Indian association football club based in the state of Sikkim

Denzong Boyz
- Full name: Denzong Boyz Football Club
- Nickname: Denzong Boyz
- Short name: DBFC
- Founded: 2008; 18 years ago
- Ground: Paljor Stadium
- Capacity: 30,000
- Manager: Phurba Sherpa
- League: Sikkim Premier Division League

Denzong Boyz Football Club (DBFC), sometimes spelled as Denzong Boys, was a professional football club based in Sikkim, India. A wing of Denzong Welfare Association, it was formed in 2008. They played in the Sikkim Premier Division League and the I-League 2nd Division.

== See also ==
- List of football clubs in India
- Football clubs in Sikkim
