= Malabar United FC =

Former Indian association football club

Malabar United മലബാർ യുണൈറ്റട്
- Full name: Malabar United Football Club
- Founded: 2007; 18 years ago
- Ground: Jawaharlal Nehru Stadium, Kochi, Kerala
- Capacity: 80,000 (limited To 39,000 by FIFA from 2017)
Home colours	Away colours

Malabar United Football Club was an Indian professional football club based in Malabar, Kerala. The club has played in the I-League 2nd Division, alongside the Kerala Premier League.

== History ==
Malabar United Football Club was founded in 2007 by Mohammed Mannil. They started off their history by playing in the local Cochin Premier League. They finished in the semi-finals in the 2008 Cochin Premier League. They then participated in the I-League 2nd Division for the first time in 2009 but did not get promoted. They then tried again in 2010 and 2011 but ultimately failed to gain promotion to the I-League. The club then skipped out of next season in the 2012 I-League 2nd Division.
