= Viva Kerala FC =

Former Indian association football club

Viva Kerala
- Full name: Viva Kerala Football Club
- Short name: VKFC
- Founded: 9 May 2004; 22 years ago (as Viva Kerala)
- Dissolved: 2012; 14 years ago
- Ground: EMS Corporation Stadium; Jawahar Municipal Stadium; Jawaharlal Nehru Stadium
- Capacity: 80,000; 30,000; 80,000
- Owner: Chirag United Sports Pvt Ltd
Home colours	Away colours

Viva Kerala Football Club (also known as Chirag United Club Kerala) was an Indian professional football club based in the city of Kochi, Kerala. The club was originally formed in 2004 as Viva Kerala. They participated in the National Football League, and later in the I-League, then the top tier of Indian football league system, alongside the Kerala Premier League. The club was dissolved in 2012.

Described as one of the most talented and youngest sides in I-League, Viva Kerala was one of the unluckiest sides in domestic league history. The club was briefly managed by noted Indian coach T. K. Chatunni. They got dissolved in 2012.

== History ==
=== Formation and journey ===
Viva Kerala was formed on 8 August 2004 in Kochi. The club officially took off on 19 August in a ceremony at the FACT grounds. The team was predominantly formed by a group of businessmen who felt the need for the state's representation in country's domestic top flight league, the National Football League (NFL). Viva Kerala's name is the result of a contest, won by Dr. P Ramakrishnan of Ernakulam. The club became registered with Ernakulam District Football Association. Later known as "Chirag Kerala", the club won the 2005–06 season of Kerala State Football League, its only regional title. In September 2006, they emerged victorious in Tirur All-India Football Tournament in Tirur, beating Travancore Titanium XI 1–0. They also reached the final of E. K. Nayanar Memorial Football Gold Cup in 2007 but lost at the end to the visiting Ghanaian club Nania Accra, by 3–0 margin.

In 2007, the opportunity for an NFL spot came in the way of Second Division NFL. Viva Kerala surprised everyone by finishing second in its group and qualified for the final phase. In the final phase, they finished as runners-up of the Second Division NFL to book their place in the I-League 2007–08 on 6 April 2007. The club along with Salgaocar, were relegated to 2nd division at the end of I-league 2007–08, for the first time in the league history. In the next season, Viva Kerala were promoted to the 2009–10 I-League, after finishing runners-up in 2009 I-League 2nd Division. In 2010, it was announced that I-League clubs needed to complete the AFC club licensing criteria; Viva Kerala signed P. K. Kunhikrishnan (A-licensed coach) as the new head coach. In August 2011, Chirag Computers was announced as the to be new majority owners and the club name would change to Chirag United Club Kerala.

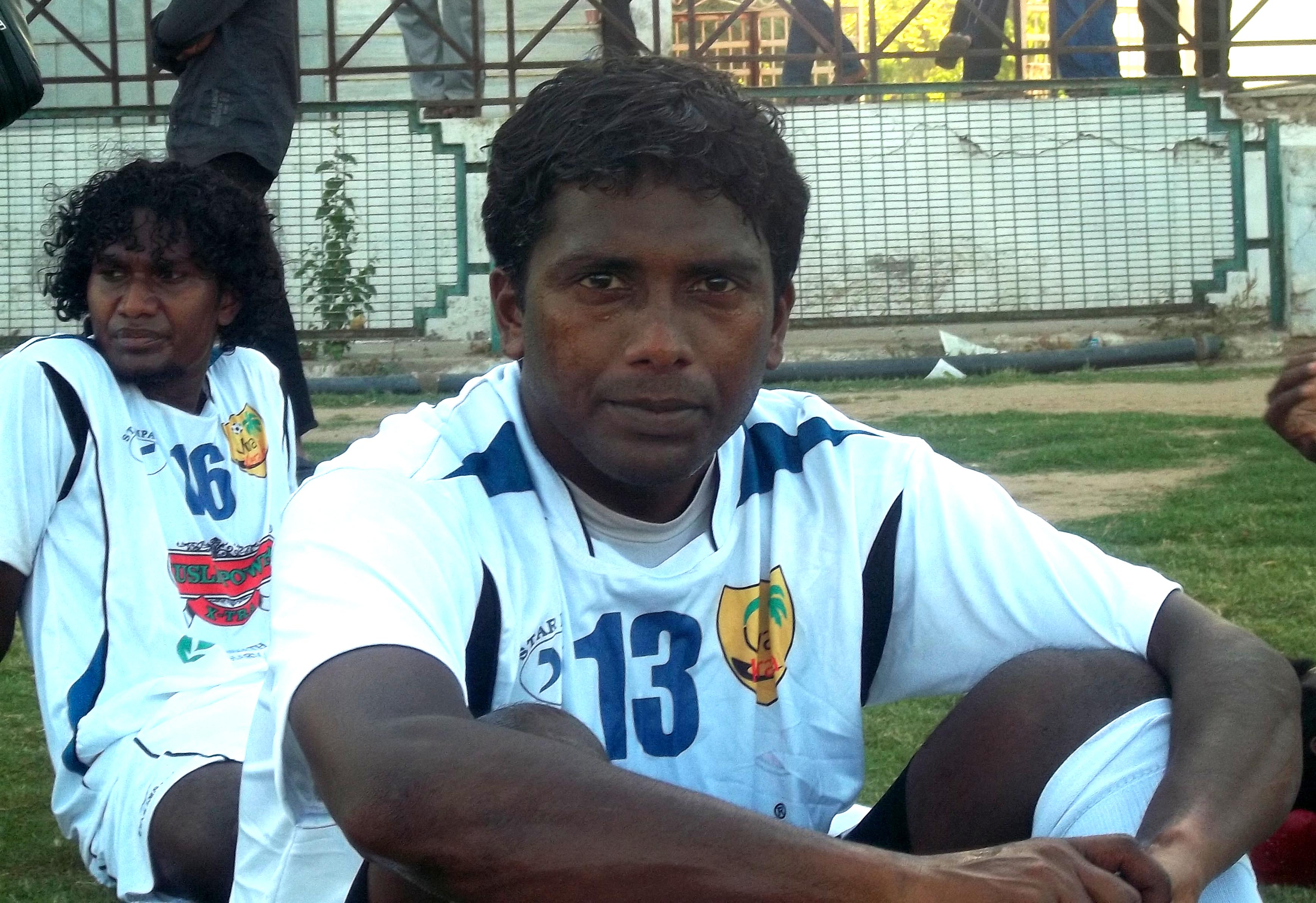
NP pradeep and Chintha Chandrashekhar Rao of Chirag United in 2011

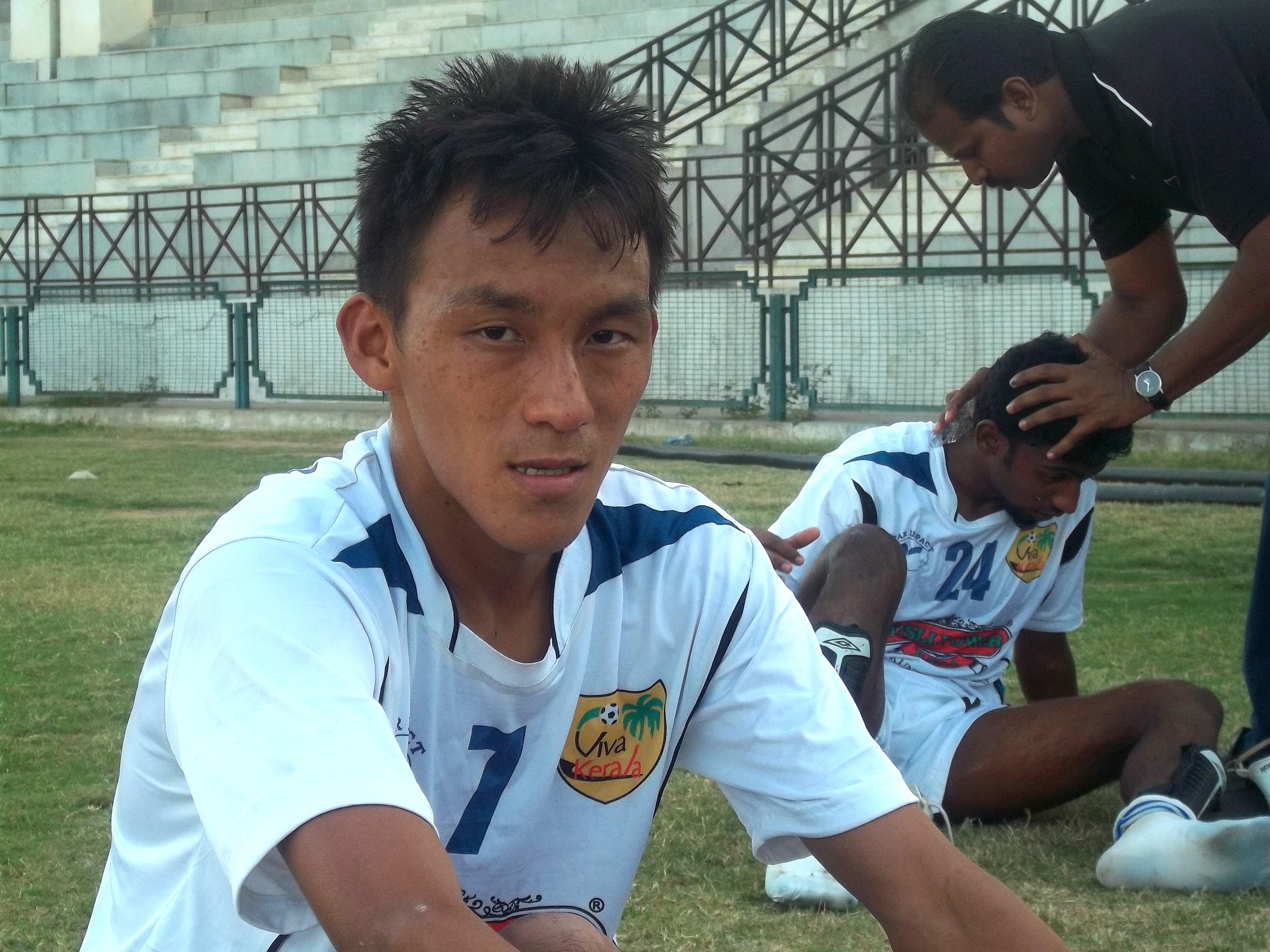
Karma Tsewang with Chirag after a match in 2011

In June 2011, Kolkata-based Chirag Computers bought the financially troubled Viva Kerala. They took over a 60% stake in the club while original owners retained a 40% stake. They also changed the name of the club to Chirag United Club Kerala. Chirag Computers have also said that they might move the team to Kolkata if they do not find a suitable stadium in Kerala. The name of the team was officially changed to Chirag United Club Kerala on 6 August 2011. While the new owners announced that team will be based in Kerala for the 2011–12 I-League, there were talks of shifting the team to Kolkata after the season. This would leave the state of Kerala without representation in the I-League. Many supporters of the club had come out strongly against this idea.

=== Last season (2011–12) ===
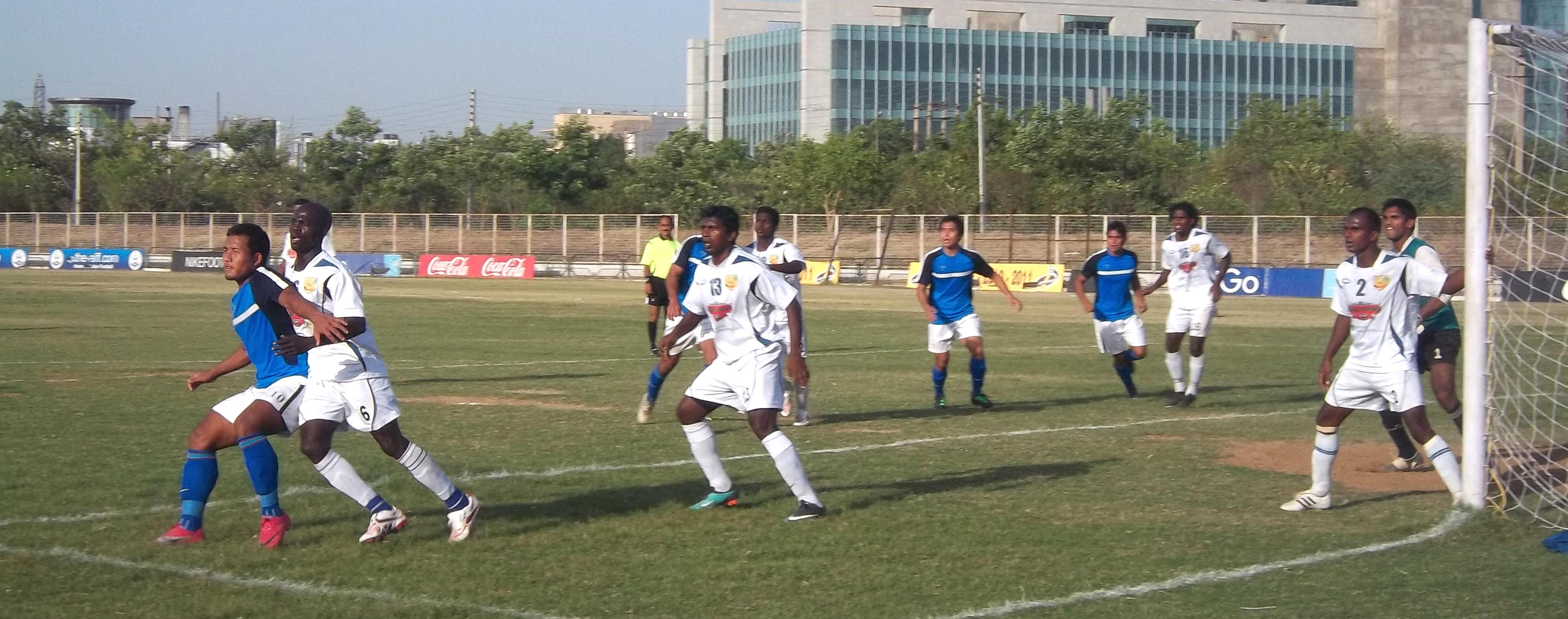
Viva Kerala players (in white) in action during Kerala Premier League in 2011.

Chirag was eliminated from the Federation Cup in the group stages when they lost all three group D matches; Team coach K. P. Kunhikrishan was replaced by Sri Lankan manager Mohamed Nizam Packeer Ally. He guided the team in I-League. Pakir was sacked in February after a poor run; Ananta Kumar Ghosh was appointed coach while Biswajit Bhattacharya was appointed technical director. Chirag finished second to last at 12th in the 2011–12 I-League season, Pailan Arrows had finished 13th were exempted from relegation as a "developmental team", and so Chirag relegated. Though in that season, they achieved fame after giving a tough fight to Campeonato Brasileiro Série A club Botafogo in their 1–0 defeat at a group stage match in 2012 IFA Shield. Players may have had difficulty being paid when Chirag Computers may not have released sponsorship money to the club, and the reason why club got dissolved.

== Club crest and kits ==
=== Crest ===
Club crest used after Chirag take-over in 2012

The Chirag crest was very colourful. It shows a yellow shield with the words "Chirag United Kerala", which is imposed over a coconut tree and a soccer ball.

=== Kit manufacturers and shirt sponsors ===
Period	Kit Manufacturers	Shirt Sponsor
2004–2010	Adidas	
2010–2011	Adidas	Musli Power X-tra
2011–2012	RP Clothing	Chirag Computers

== Stadiums ==
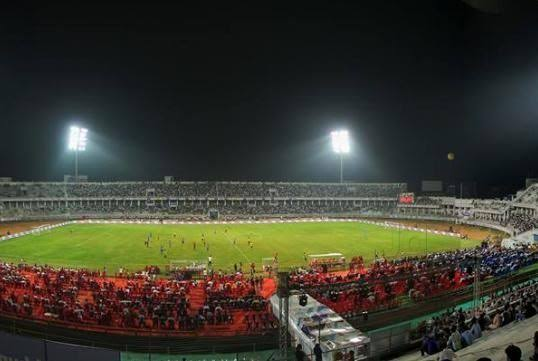
EMS Corporation Stadium in Kozhikode, used as the hoke ground of Chirag United Club Kerala for the first three seasons

Ever since their creation Viva Kerala have used multiple stadiums in Kerala. For their first three I-League seasons they used the Municipal Corporation Stadium which holds a capacity of 80,000 in Kozhikode, and Jawahar Municipal Stadium which holds a capacity of 30,000 in Kannur.

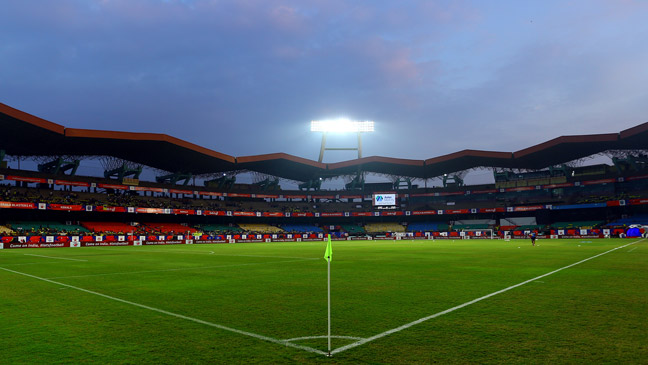
Jawaharlal Nehru Stadium in Kochi

They then after getting bought by Chirag Computers decided to move to the Jawarharlal Nehru International Stadium in Kochi which boasts a capacity of 70,000 and has working floodlights. They played all their home games of 2011–12 I-League at the Jawarharlal Nehru International Stadium.

== Rivalries ==
Viva Kerala shared rivalries with other Kerala-based clubs including Kerala Police FC, SBI Kerala, FC Kochin, Travancore Titanium XI and Quartz Calicut, whom they faced in both the domestic and regional leagues.

== Ownership ==
The club was established in 2004 by a group of businessmen with an objective to represent Kerala in higher circles of domestic football in India. Interestingly, the name of the club was arrived upon through a public contest organised by the promoters of the club.

The club was run by Musli Power X-tra Kunnath Pharmaceuticals. In July 2011, Chirag Computers came in and brought full stake in the club, changing the name to "Chirag United Club Kerala".

== Notable players ==
The following foreign players of Viva Kerala have been capped at senior/youth international level, with their respective countries. Years in brackets indicate their spells at the club.

- (Bulgaria) Georji Ventseslavov Bizev (2006–2007)
- (Ghana) Yaw Amankwah Mireku (2007–2008)
- (Ghana) Wisdom Abbey (2007–2008)
- (Thailand) Wisoot Bunpeng (2009)
- (Kenya) Peter Opiyo (2009–2010)
- (Ghana) Charles Dzisah (2009–2011)
- (Nigeria) Bello Razaq (2009–2012)
- (Tibet) Karma Tsewang (2010–2011)
- (Sierra Leone) Mohamed Kallon (2011)
- (Denmark) Simon Azoulay Pedersen (2011–2012)
- (Ghana) Isaac Boakye (2012)

== Managerial history ==
Note: The following list may not be complete

Name	Nationality	Years	Note
T. K. Chathunni	India	2004–2006	
A. M. Sreedharan	India	2006–2010	
K. P. Kunhikrishan	India	2010–2011	
Mohamed Nizam Packeer Ally	Sri Lanka	2011–2012	
Ananta Kumar Ghosh	India	2012	

== Team records ==
=== Notable wins against foreign teams ===
As of matches played 24 April 2007

Competition	Round	Year	Opposition	Score	Venue	City	Ref
E. K. Nayanar Memorial Gold Cup	Group stages	2007	(Nigeria) Dynamo Lagos	4–1	Kannur Municipal Corporation Stadium	Kannur	
E. K. Nayanar Memorial Gold Cup	Group stage	2007	Iran XI	2–1	Kannur Municipal Corporation Stadium	Kannur	

== Honours ==
=== League ===
- National Football League II
  - Runners-up (1): 2006–07
- I-League 2nd Division
  - Runners-up (1): 2009
- Kerala Football League
  - Champions (1): 2005–06
  - Runners-up (1): 2004–05
  - Third place (1): 2007
- Kerala State Club Football Championship
  - Runners-up (1): 2005
- National Football League III (South Zone)
  - Champions (1): 2006–07

=== Cup ===
- All-India Invitational Cup of Thiruvananthapuram
  - Champions (1): 2005
- Tirur All-India Football Tournament
  - Champions (1): 2006
- E. K. Nayanar Memorial Gold Cup
  - Runners-up (1): 2007

== See also ==
- History of Chirag United Club Kerala
- List of football clubs in Kerala
- Sports in Kerala

== Footnotes ==
1. Represented Tibet national football team in CONIFA tournaments internationally.
