= Bodoland Martyrs Gold Cup =

Association football tournament in India

- Organiser(s): Kokrajhar District Sports Association
- Founded: 2000; 26 years ago
- Region: India
- Teams: 12
- Current champions: Global FC Gossaigaon
- 2025

The Bodoland Martyrs Gold Cup is a football tournament in the Bodoland Territorial Region, Assam, India. This tournament is organised by Kokrajhar District Sports Association (KDSA) in memory of Bodoland martyrs, who sacrificed their lives for the cause of Bodoland movement.

The 21st edition of the tournament was won by United Chirang Duar FC, Runikhata by defeating Baarhoongkha Athletic Club, Kokrajhar 1–0 in the final, played at Banargaon Jaiklong Sports Club ground. They got I-League 2 qualifier spot, since the Assam State Premier League has not been held.

== 2017 season ==
The 2017 season was won by Gobinda Basumatary FC (GBFC) from Gossaigaon defeating NF Railway Sports Club, Maligaon by a scoreline of 1–0. Chuinedu Gnene scored the lone goal in the 70th minute.

A trophy and cash award of Rs 1 lakh was handed over to the champion team by BTC chief Hagrama Mohilary. Doneswar Goyari, executive member of BTC handed over the runners-up trophy along with cash award of Rs 50,000 to the NF Railway team. IGP BTAD Anurag Agarwal gave away the best player of the match trophy along with a cash award of Rs 5,000 to Chuinedu Gnene of GBFC.

== Results ==
List of Bodoland Martyrs Gold Cup finals
Year	Winners	Score	Runners-up	Ref.
2004	Mohammedan Sporting			
2010	FCI, Guwahati	2–1	ASEB, Guwahati	
2014	Gossaigaon Global Sports Academy	1–0	Kashibari Youth Club, Udalguri	
2015	Shalbagan FC, Gossaigaon	2–0	Gobinda Basumatary Football Academy, Jaraguri	
2016	Baarhoongkha Athletic Club	3–1	Assam Police Blues	
2017	Gobinda Basumatary Football Club	1–0	NF Railway Sports Club, Maligaon	
2018	Mohammedan Sporting	0–0 (5–4 p)	Oil India	
2019	Elevenstar Club, Bongaigaon	1–0	Baarhoongkha Athletic Club, Kokrajhar	
2022	United Chirang Duar, Runikhata	1–0	Baarhoongkha Athletic Club, Kokrajhar	
2023	Baarhoongkha Athletic Club, Kokrajhar	2–0	Shalbagan FC, Gossaigaon	
2024	Jothai Club, Kokrajhar	2–1	Elevenstar Club, Bongaigaon	
2025	Global FC, Gossaigaon	1–1 (3–2 p)	Shalbagan FC, Gossaigaon	

== See also ==
- Assam Football Association
- Bordoloi Trophy
- ATPA Shield
- Assam State Premier League
- Bodousa Cup
- Independence Day Cup (Assam)
