= Gilbertson Sangma =

Indian footballer (1955–2026)

Personal information
- Date of birth: 12 April 1955
- Place of birth: Boko, Assam, India
- Date of death: 3 April 2026 (aged 70)
- Position: Forward

Senior career*
Years	Team	Apps	(Gls)
1972–1985	Assam Police		
1973–1980	Assam		

International career
1975–?	India	3	
- * Club domestic league appearances and goals

Gilbertson Sangma (12 April 1955 – 3 April 2026) was an Indian footballer who played as a forward.

== Club career ==
=== Early career ===
Sangma received early lessons of football at the Assam Police Reserve in Dergaon.

=== Assam ===
In 1973, he began his senior career in the Inter District Football Championships by representing Golaghat. He was selected immediately in the Assam state team for the Santosh Trophy. In 1974–75, he scored the goal that knocked out the defending champions Kerala and took Assam to the quarter-final. He represented the state team in seven seasons from 1973 to 1980 in Santosh Trophy.

=== Assam Police ===
After joining the Assam Police he became a regular player of the Assam Police AC since 1972. In 1981, Sangma guided Assam Police AC to win the Bordoloi Trophy, where he scored the winning goal in final against the mighty Dempo SC of Goa. He helped the team to lift several trophies including coveted Bordoloi Trophy, Independence Day Cup and ATPA Shield.

== International career ==
In 1975, Sangma was picked in the Indian team for three International friendly matches in Indonesia and Thailand.

== Playing style ==
Sangma was described as the "man with golden boot" by the Hindustan Times because of his skill, agility and stamina.

== Personal life and death ==
After retiring from the Assam Police as a top official, he was regularly associated with different local football activities in Guwahati.

Sangma died on 3 April 2026, at the age of 70.
