= National Football League Second Division (India) =

Second division of National Football League

- Founded: 1997
- Folded: 2007 (reformed as the I-League 2nd Division)
- Country: India
- Confederation: AFC
- Level on pyramid: 2
- Promotion to: National Football League
- Relegation to: National Football League Third Division
- Domestic cup(s): Federation Cup; Durand Cup
- Last champions: Salgaocar (2006–07)
- Most championships: State Bank of Travancore (2 titles)

The National Football League Second Division (NFL 2nd Division) was the men's second-tier of the Indian football league system from 1997 to 2007. Founded by the All India Football Federation (AIFF) in 1997, the NFL was the inaugural second division football league in India to be organized on a national scale. The NFL Second Division was eventually replaced by the I-League 2nd Division for the 2007–08 season.

== Clubs ==
More than 120 different professional and semi-professional clubs played in the league from the beginning in 1997/98 to last season 2006/07.

All Clubs
Club	City/State/UT	Seasons in NFL-II
Kerala Police	Thiruvananthapuram	1997-98
Tollygunge Agragami	Kolkata	1997-98, 2005–06
Eastern Sporting Union	Imphal	1997-98, 1999-00, 2000–01, 2002-03
Border Security Force	Jalandhar	1997-98, 1998–99, 2000–01, 2002–03, 2003–04, 2004–05, 2006–07
Mohammedan	Kolkata	1997-98, 2000–01, 2002–03, 2004-05
Tisco FC	Bihar	1997-98
TBL FC	Mizoram	1997-98
City Club	Delhi	1997-98
2nd Assam Special Reserved Force	Diphu	1997-98
Indian Telephone Industries Limited	Bangalore	1997-98, 2003–04
Sesa Sports Club	Goa	1997-98
State Bank of Travancore	Thiruvananthapuram	1997-98, 1998–99, 2002–03, 2005–06, 2007–08
Central Railway	Mumbai	1997-98, 2000–01, 2002–03
South Central Railway	Secunderabad	1997-98
Southern Railway	Chennai	1997-98
Integral Coach Factory	Perambur	1998-99, 2002–03, 2003–04, 2004-05
Assam Police	Assam	1998-99, 2006-07
Orissa Police	Orissa	1998-99
Sagolband United FC	Imphal	1998-99
Railsima Tigers	Hyderabad	1998-99
Indian Air Force	New Delhi	1998-99, 2004–05
Calcutta Port Trust	Kolkata	1998-99, 2001–02, 2002–03
Blood Mouth FC	Agartala	1998-99, 2002–03
Nongthymmai SCC	Shillong	1998-99
Vasco	Vasco da Gama, Goa	1998-99, 1999-00, 2005–06, 2006-07
Indian National	New Delhi	1999-00, 2000–01, 2002–03
Indian Bank	Chennai	1999-00, 2000–01, 2004–05, 2005–06, 2006–07
State Bank of India	Hyderabad	1999-00
Assam Rifles	Assam	1999-00, 2000–01, 2005–06
Bengal Mumbai	Mumbai	1998-99, 1999-00, 2001–02, 2004-05
Langsning	Shillong	1999-00, 2000–01, 2002–03
Rail Couch Factory	Kapurthala	1999-00, 2001–02, 2003–04
Air India	Mumbai	1999-00, 2002–03, 2003–04, 2004-05
Tata Football Academy	Jamshedpur	1998-99, 1999-00, 2000–01, 2001–02, 2002–03, 2003–04, 2004–05, 2005-06
Dinthar FC	Mizoram	1999-00
Benares Dynamo FC	Benares	1999-00
Indian Overseas Bank	Chennai	1999-00
Hindustan Aeronautics Limited	Bangalore	1998-99, 1999-00, 2000–01, 2003–04, 2004–05, 2005–06
Youngsters Club	Chandigarh	1999-00
Pondicherry Police	Pondicherry	1999-00, 2006–07
Jobra Durga Club	Orissa	1999-00, 2000–01, 2001–02
Himalayan Tigers FC	Himachal Pradesh	2000-01, 2006–07
City Club	Haryana	2000-01
Punjab Police	Jalandhar	2000-01, 2002–03, 2003–04, 2004–05, 2005–06, 2006–07
J&K Bank	Srinagar	2000-01, 2002–03, 2003–04, 2004–05, 2006–07
39 Gorkha Training Center	Varanasi	2000-01
Chandigarh Police	Chandigarh	2000-01, 2002–03
Ageya Chalo Sangha	Agartala	2000-01, 2001–02
Football Club of Mizoram	Mizoram	2000-01
Nagaland Police	Nagaland	2000-01
Dempo	Goa	2000-01
Sporting Clube de Goa	Goa	2000-01, 2002–03
City Police	Ahmedabad	2000-01
Central Reserve Police Force	Neemuch	2000-01, 2002–03
Nivia Club	Kota	2000-01, 2001–02
Central Exercise Recreation Club	Kochi	2000-01
State Bank of Hyderabad	Hyderabad	2000-01, 2001–02
Pax of Nagoa	Goa	2001-02
Titanium XI	Thiruvananthapuram	2001-02, 2002–03, 2003–04, 2004-05
Providence FC	Vadodara	2001-02
Karnataka State Police	Karnataka	2001-02, 2002–03, 2004–05
Manjela Club A	Daman and Diu	2001-02
ASEB Sports Club	Assam	2001-02, 2002–03, 2003–04, 2004-05
Hindustan Club	Delhi	2001-02, 2002–03, 2003–04, 2004-05
Uttar Pradesh Police	Uttar Pradesh	2001-02, 2002–03, 2003–04, 2004–05, 2006–07
Boys Athletic Club	Gangtok	2001-02
Chennai Customs	Chennai	2001-02
CIL Bangalore	Bangalore	2001-02
Kerala State Electricity Board	Kerala	2001-02, 2003–04, 2006–07
Young Challenger	Pondicherry	2001-02, 2004–05
Audit G	Chandigarh	2001-02
Raj Milk FC	Patna	2001-02, 2002–03, 2003–04
Jammu & Kashmir Police	Jammu & Kashmir	2001-02
Manipur Police	Manipur	2001-02, 2002–03, 2003–04, 2004-05
Lajong Sports Club	Shillong	2001-02, 2002–03, 2003–04, 2004–05, 2006–07
Himachal Tigers	Himachal Pradesh	2001-02
Central Railway	Madhya Pradesh	2001-02
Chottu Ram Zamindar Club	Sonepat	2001-02
Assam A Team	Assam	2001-02
NEROCA	Manipur	2001-02, 2003–04
Education Department	Nagaland	2001-02
Bhratri Sangha	Kolkata	2001-02
Punjab State Electricity Board	Punjab	2002-03
Rewari FC	Rewari	2002-03
Him Club	Shimla	2002-03
1st Mizoram Armed Police	Aizawl	2002-03
Oil India	Duliajan	2002-03, 2003–04
Fransa-Pax	Goa	2002-03, 2003–04
Border Security Force	Jodhpur	2002-03
Reserve Bank of India	Ahmedabad	2002-03
Satyabhama Engineering College	Pondicherry	2002-03
Madras Engineering Group	Bangalore	2002-03
AG's Office Recreation Club	Chennai	2002-03
Kochin	Kochi	2002-03, 2003–04
Eveready Sports Association	Kolkata	2003-04, 2004–05, 2005–06
Haywards 2000 Holi Family	Mumbai	2003-04
Controllerate of Inspection Electronics		2003-04
Gujarat Police	Gujarat	2003-04
Nine Bullets	Agartala	2004-05, 2006–07
Azad Sporting Club	Patna	2004-05
SAI Centre	Cuttack	2004–05
Sports College FC	Haldwani	2004-05
Cabral Sports Club	Goa	2004-05
Madras Sporting Union	Chennai	2004-05
Churchill Brothers	Goa	2005-06
Simla Youngs	New Delhi	2005-06
Army XI		2005-06, 2006–07
Chandigarh FC	Chandigarh	2006-07
Amity United	Haryana	2006-07
Uttranchal Police	Uttaranchal	2006-07
Shastri FC	New Delhi	2006-07
South-East-Central Railway	Chhattisgarh	2006-07
Tata Steel	Jharkhand	2006-07
Patliputra FC	Bihar	2006-07
Viva Kerala	Kerala	2006-07
SAI Bangalore	Bangalore	2006-07
1st Battalion MA Police	Mizoram	2006-07
Chirag United	Kolkata	2006-07
ONGC	Mumbai	2006-07
Salgaocar	Goa	2006-07

== Champions ==
Season	Champions (number of titles)
1997–98	Tollygunge Agragami
1998–99	State Bank of Travancore
1999–2000	Air India
2000–01	HAL
2001–02	Dempo
2002–03	Sporting Goa
2003–04	State Bank of Travancore
2004–05	Mohammedan
2005–06	Tata FA
2006–07	Salgaocar

== Promoted teams ==
Season	Promoted as champions	Promoted as Runners-up	Promoted as replacement
1997–98	Tollygunge Agragami	ITI	-
1998–99	State Bank of Travancore	Border Security Force	-
1999–2000	Air India	Vasco	-
2000–01	HAL	Punjab Police	-
2001–02	Dempo	Indian Bank	-
2002–03	Sporting Goa	Mohammedan	-
2003–04	State Bank of Travancore	Fransa-Pax	-
2004–05	Mohammedan	Air India	-
2005–06	Tata FA	Churchill Brothers	HAL
2006–07	Salgaocar	Viva Kerala	-

Notes

1. Promotion: HAL were promoted due to Tata FA refusal to professionalise.

== See also ==
- Indian National Football League
- Indian Super Cup (1997–2011)
- Indian Super League
- I-League
- Super Cup
