= Oil India Gold Cup =

- Organiser(s): Oil India (Duliajan)
- Founded: 2005; 21 years ago
- Region: Assam, India
- Teams: 20 (in 2025)
- Current champions: Punjab (R) (1st title)
- Most championships: Oil India (3 titles)
- Broadcaster: Oil India (YouTube)
- 2026

The Oil India Gold Cup (also held as Oil India Challenge Gold Cup) is an invitational football tournament in India, held in Duliajan, Assam and organised by Oil India annually under the supervision of Assam Football Association. The tournament was incorporated in 2005.

The 8th edition of the Oil India Gold Cup football tournament will be held from October 21, 2025.

== Results ==
List of winners and runner-up of Oil India Gold Cup:

List of Oil India Gold Cup Finals
Year	Winners	Score	Runners-up	Ref.
2005	Oil India	0–0 (6–5 p)	Assam Police Blues	
2006	Assam Rifles	2–1	Oil India	
2007–08	Vasco	0–0 (5–4 p)	Oil India	
2008–09	Oil India	1–0	George Telegraph	
2009	Oil India	2–1	Punjab Police	
2010–11	JCB Bhilai Brothers	1–1 (4–2 p)	Punjab Police	
2012	ASEB	2–0	Oil India	
2025	Diamond Harbour	2–0	Shillong Lajong	
2026	Punjab (R)	1–1 (4–2 p)	Oil India	

== Performance by teams ==
Team	Champions	Runners-up	Last win
Oil India	3	3	2009
Assam Rifles	1	0	2006
Vasco	1	0	2007–08
JCB Bhilai Brothers	1	0	2010–11
Diamond Harbour	1	0	2025
ASEB Sports Club	1	0	2012
Punjab Police	0	2	—
Assam Police Blues	0	1	—
George Telegraph	0	1	—
Shillong Lajong	0	1	—
