= 2025 Bordoloi Trophy =

Tournament details
- Country: India
- Venue(s): Judges Field, Guwahati, Assam (Final Round)
- Dates: 29 January – 13 March 2025
- Teams: 285

Final positions
- Champions: NF Railway (1st title)
- Runners-up: NorthEast United
- Third place: Shillong Lajong; Global

Tournament statistics
- Matches played: 500+

The 2025 Bordoloi Trophy is the 70th season of the Bordoloi Trophy, which is hosted in the state of Assam by Guwahati Sports Association. The tournament is also known as the Bharat Ratna Lokopriya Gopinath Bordoloi Trophy and commenced on 29 January.

NF Railway SA won their first title after defeating NorthEast United FC in the final on penalty shoot-out.

== Format ==
Round	No. of teams	Qualification
District	280	8 teams each from 35 districts
Cluster	35	Winners of each districts will be grouped into six clusters.
Final	17	Top two teams from all six clusters; Top two teams of Guwahati Premier Football League 2024: NF Railway SA, Pride East Mavericks; Three invited clubs: NorthEast United FC, Shillong Lajong FC, Oil India FC

== Cluster Round ==
=== Clusters ===
Cluster	Districts	Venue
Upper Assam	Group A: Charaideo, Jorhat, Sivasagar; Group B: Dibrugarh, Majuli, Tinsukia	Piyoli Phukan Stadium, Sivasagar
Northern Assam	Biswanath, Darrang, Dhemaji, Lakhimpur, Sonitpur	Polo Ground, Tezpur
Central Assam	Golaghat, Hojai, Morigaon, Nagaon, West Karbi Anglong	Khirod Baruah Stadium, Morigaon
Lower Assam	Group A: Barpeta, Dhubri, South Salmara-Mankachar, Kokrajhar; Group B: Baksa, Bongaigaon, Chirang	Chilarai Stadium, Bongaigaon
Barak Valley	Cachar, Dima Hasao, Hailakandi, Karbi Anglong, Sribhumi	KASA Stadium, Diphu
Capital Region	Group A: Bajali, Kamrup Metropolitan, Nalbari; Group B: Goalpara, Kamrup, Tamulpur	Chamata Anchalik Krira Sangha Stadium, Nalbari

== Final Round ==
Qualified Teams
Cluster	District	Team
Upper Assam	Tinsukia	Barekuri FC
Upper Assam	Dibrugarh	19th Assam Police Battalion
Northern Assam	Lakhimpur	Dubi SA
Northern Assam	Sonitpur	Dhekiajuli Town Club
Central Assam	Morigaon	Navajyoti Club
Central Assam	Nagaon	Trinayan Goshti
Lower Assam	Barpeta	Baradi FC
Lower Assam	Kokrajhar	Global FC
Barak Valley	Cachar	Lenruol FC
Barak Valley	Dima Hasao	Dima United FC
Capital Region	Kamrup Metro	ASEB SC
Capital Region	Kamrup	Rani Coaching Centre

=== Pre quarter–finals ===
Team 1	Score	Team 2
NF Railway	2–0	Barekuri
Navajyoti Club	0–2	Lenruol
Pride East Mavericks	1–3	Rani Coaching Center
Baradi	1–0	19th Assam Police Battalion
ASEB	3–2	Dima United
Dubi SA	1–1 (4–2 p)	Trinayan Goshti
Oil India	2–3	Global
NorthEast United	1–0	Dhekiajuli Town Club
Lenruol	4–2	Baradi

=== Quarter–finals ===
Team 1	Score	Team 2
NF Railway	2–0	ASEB
Dubi SA	1–3	Global
NorthEast United	2–0	Rani Coaching Center
Shillong Lajong	6–1	Lenruol

=== Semi-finals ===
Team 1	Score	Team 2
NF Railway	3–1	Global
NorthEast United	1–0 (a.e.t.)	Shillong Lajong

=== Final ===
Team 1	Score	Team 2
NF Railway	1–1 (6–5 p)	NorthEast United
