= Jewel Bey =

Indian footballer (born 1969)

Personal information
- Full name: Jewel Bey
- Date of birth: 16 April 1969 (age 57)
- Place of birth: Karbi Anglong, Assam, India
- Position: Midfielder

Senior career*
Years	Team	Apps	(Gls)
?	Maharana Athletic Club	?	(?)
?	Gauhati Town Club	?	(?)
?	ASEB	?	(?)
?	SAI Guwahati	?	(?)
?	Assam Police Blues	?	(?)
?	Dempo	?	(?)
?	Mahindra & Mahindra	?	(?)

International career
1989–1994	India		
- * Club domestic league appearances and goals

Jewel Bey (born 16 April 1969) is a former Indian footballer from Assam. Bey played as a midfielder.

== Playing career ==
=== Early career ===
Bey was born in Karbi Anglong district of Assam. In 1989, he has represented the Assam state team for the Santosh Trophy which was held in Guwahati. In 1992, he also played for the Delhi U-23 State team and Maharashtra state team in 1994.

=== Club career ===
He has played for quite a few numbers of local clubs of Assam including Maharana Athletic Club, Gauhati Town Club, ASEB SC, SAI Guwahati and Assam Police Blues.

Bey was signed by eminent clubs Dempo SC and Mahindra & Mahindra for their seasons.

=== International career ===
In 1989, he made his senior International debut for India national football team in South Asian Games. After that he represented the senior India side many occasions including 1991 Pre Olympic, 1993 Nehru Gold Cup and Pre-Olympic in 1993.

== Coaching ==
After retiring from the game, Bey is involved in coaching. In 2001, this former International midfielder joined as assistant coach of Assam Police Blues. Later, the head coach P.X. Kanan was replaced with Bey and he became the head coach cum manager of the Blues.

== Personal life ==
Bey joined Assam Police in 2001, and now serving as an Assistant Commandant in Assam Police Battalion.

== Honours ==
India

- SAFF Championship: 1993
