= Devajit Saikia =

Indian advocate

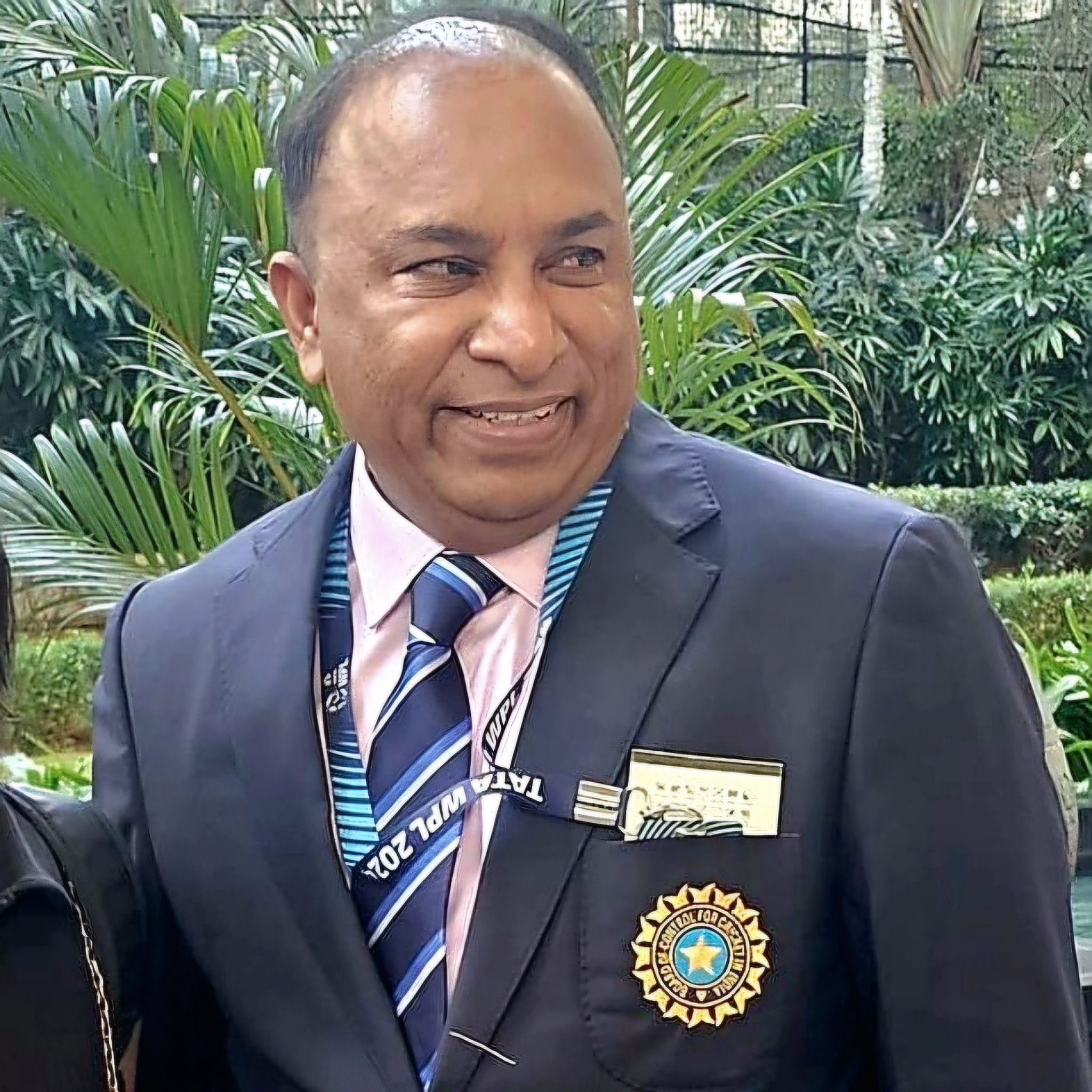

Secretary of the Board of Control for Cricket in India
- Incumbent
- Assumed office 8 December 2024
- Preceded by: Jay Shah

Advocate General of Assam
- Incumbent
- Assumed office 20 May 2021
- Appointed by: Governor Jagdish Mukhi
- Chief Minister: Himanta Biswa Sarma
- Preceded by: Romesh Gohain

Personal details
- Education: MEcon; LLB
- Alma mater: Cotton College, Gauhati University
- Occupation: Attorney; sports administrator

Devajit Saikia is an Indian advocate, a former first class cricketer and a cricket administrator. He is the secretary of the BCCI. Saikia was re-elected as the secretary of the top cricket body of India on September 28, 2025 during their 94th AGM in Mumbai. Prior to that, he was holding the position from January 2025 when Jay Shah was elected as the Chairperson of the ICC. Apart from that, Saikia is a Board Director of ICC representing the BCCI.

== Career ==
Born and raised in Guwahati, Saikia studied in Cotton College and went on to play in the Ranji Trophy for Assam cricket team as a wicket-keeper and middle order batter.

He also served as the Secretary of the Assam Cricket Association and is the General Secretary of the Guwahati Sports Association, one of the oldest sports bodies in eastern India. In addition, Saikia is the incumbent Advocate General of Assam.

Saikia served as Joint Secretary of the BCCI prior to becoming Secretary.

== Early life ==
Saikia was born on 19 April 1969 to Tunga Bhadra Saikia and Dipika Saikia at Happy Villa, Uzan Bazar, Guwahati. Known by the nickname ‘Lon’, he completed his schooling at Don Bosco School, Guwahati, where he passed his HSLC examination in 1984. His later studied Economics at Cotton College under Gauhati University, graduating in 1990 and completing his Master’s Degree in 1994.He obtained an LLB degree from Old Earle Law College (now BRM Govt. Law College) in 1996.

== Legal career ==
Saikia enrolled as a lawyer under Bar Council of Assam and began practising at the Gauhati High Court in December 1997. Before this, he worked in NF Railway from 1989 to 1991 and then at the Reserve Bank of India (Guwahati) from 1991 to 1996, both under sports quota.

Between 1997 and 2004, he practiced in areas including writ jurisdiction, criminal law and insurance law.

From 2005, he represented the Assam Government in cases involving departments like Finance, Taxation, Health and Education. In 2009, he was appointed Additional Advocate General of Meghalaya, a position he held until September 2011. From 2011 to 2014, he served as Additional Advocate General of Assam before having an unceremonious exit due to differences with the then Chief Minister Tarun Gogoi.

From 2014 to 2016, he resumed private practice, handling several public interest litigations and matters related to constitutional, criminal and service law.

In July 2016, he was appointed Senior Additional Advocate General of Assam. In 2017, he had brief stint of two months as Advocate General of Assam (acting). Later on, he continued to hold the post of Senior Additional Advocate General Assam till December 2018, when he resigned in order to be eligible to contest for the post of Secretary of Assam Cricket Association as under the eligibility norms of the association’s constitution, there existed, at the relevant point of time, a bar for anyone holding public office from contesting for any post of office bearers of the cricket association.

On 21 May 2021, he was appointed Advocate General of Assam, becoming the youngest to hold the position at 52 years and one month. He continues to hold the post.

== Cricket career ==
Saikia represented Assam in various age-group tournaments beginning in 1984 with the CK Nayudu Trophy for school cricket in Lucknow. A year later, he played in the Vijay Merchant Trophy for Assam Under-15 team in Keenan Stadium Jamshedpur in which he scored an unbeaten 55 on debut. From 1986 to 1989, he represented Assam (Under-19) in the Cooch Behar Trophy.

In the Vijay Hazare Trophy (Under-17) in 1987, he scored a century against Orissa in Kolkata, earning selection to the East Zone team to participate in the national Vijay Hazare Trophy, in which he played all three matches as the zone won the championship in Kanpur in 1987-88. Players such as Sourav Ganguly and Ranjib Biswal were his teammates in that squad.

In 1988, he also played for the Wills XI under the captainship of Maninder Singh in the now-defunct Wills Trophy.

By 1989, Saikia was selected for Assam’s Ranji Trophy side, and he played four matches in the 1989-90 season. He made his Ranji debut in 1991 and played four matches as a wicketkeeper and middle-order batter.

He discontinued professional cricket at age 21 to focus on academics.

He also represented Gauhati University in the Rohinton Baria Trophy for several seasons.

His cricket involvement extended beyond traditional formats. In 2003, Saikia represented various teams in six-a-side tournaments across Asia and the United Kingdom. In 2004, he played for the Indian Lawyers Team in Colombo and Galle in Sri Lanka, and in 2005 he took part in a lawyers' cricket tournament in London. He later toured the West Indies (Barbados and Trinidad & Tobago) in 2006, followed by a second tour of the United Kingdom. He participated in the Lawyers’ World Cup held in Cambridge and London in 2009, where the Indian team finished as runners-up to Australia. In 2015-16, he captained one of two Indian Lawyers Team in the Lawyers’ World Cup in Brisbane, Australia and continued to represent the team in the 2017-18 edition held in Sri Lanka.

== Sports administrator ==
Saikia entered sports administration began in 2003 when he was elected Vice President of Gauhati Town Club (GTC), a century-old prestigious sports club in eastern India. In 2008, he was elected as General Secretary of GTC, with Dr. Himanta Biswa Sarma as President, during which time several sports academies were established in chess, boxing, football and cricket.

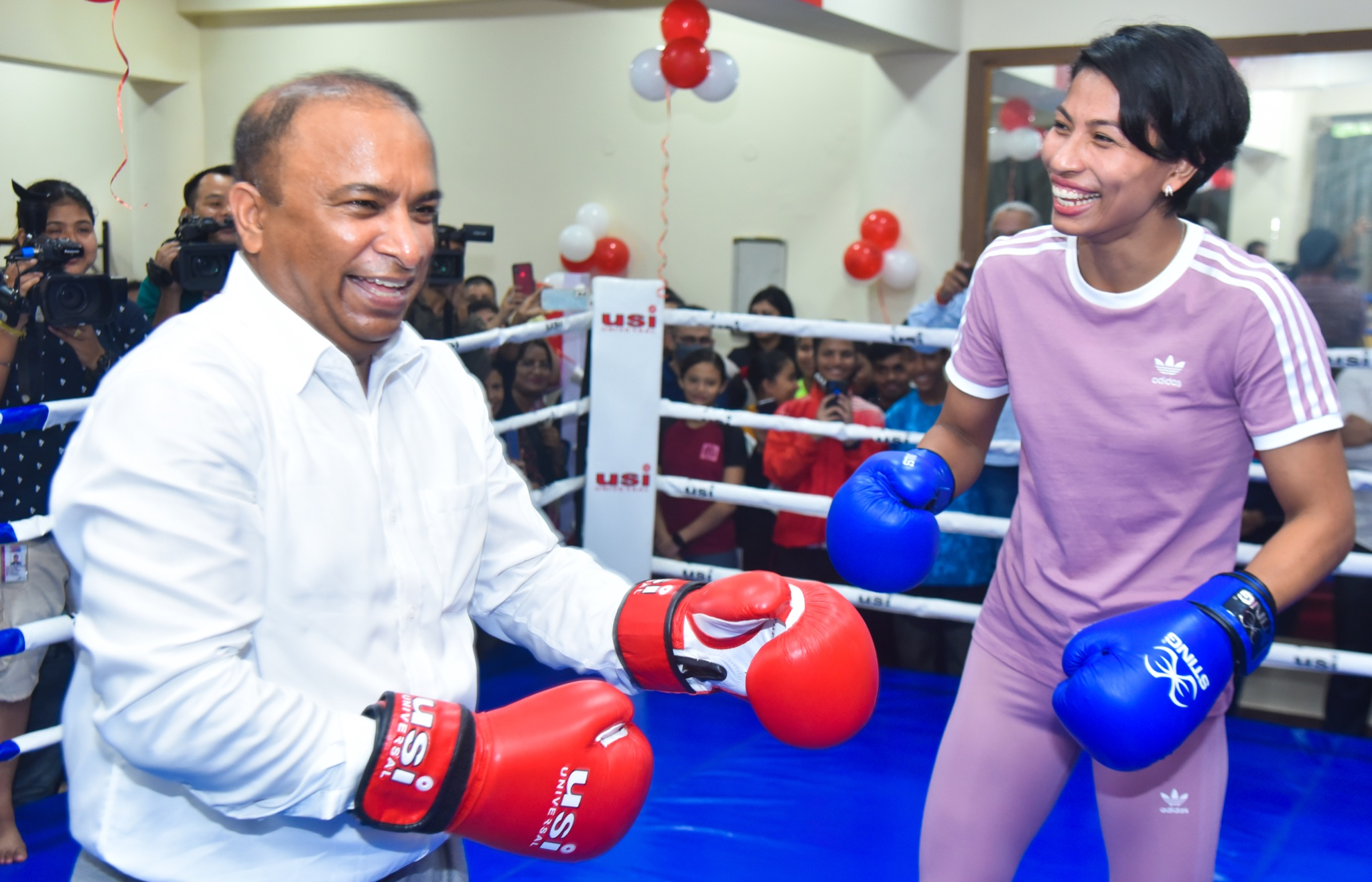
Devajit Saikia is seen with Olympic medallist boxer Lovlina Borgohain during the inauguration of the Boxing Academy of Gauhati Town Club.

During this time, Saikia, along with four others, filed a Public Interest Litigation in the Gauhati High Court seeking the restoration of Judges' Field, which had increasingly been used for commercial and non-sporting activities. The petition aimed to return the ground to its intended use as a sports venue. Following the court's directives, Judges' Field was restored and equipped with sports infrastructure, including flood light system and earthen galleries, and designated primarily for sports-related activities.

During his tenure, GTC undertook several infrastructure and programme expansions. In 2010, the club inaugurated its new building and introduced initiatives such as the Residential Football Academy and the Cricket Centre of Excellence. The Swimming Centre and GTC Chess Academy were also established that year. Additional facilities were added later, including a Badminton Coaching Centre in 2014 and a Boxing Academy in 2021, the latter inaugurated by Olympic medalist Lovlina Borgohain.

In 2014, Saikia filed a Public Interest Litigation regarding financial corruption and irregularities in team selection within the Assam Cricket Association (ACA). The case led to court-directed reforms, and in May 2016 one of the incumbent office bearers was barred from contesting elections. The association at the time faced several allegations of mismanagement and corruption.

In June 2016, a new ACA committee was formed, with Dr. Himanta Biswa Sarma as President, and Saikia was elected as one of the six Vice Presidents.

Saikia briefly resigned from the post of Vice President of ACA in 2018 due to his indifferences with the then General Secretary but later withdrew his resignation at the request of the Governing Body.

Between 2016 and 2018, he contributed to efforts to secure funds for completing the ACA Stadium in Barsapara and supported the continuation of cricket activities during a period of financial strain caused by the halt of BCCI funding amid ongoing litigation in the Supreme Court. He was also part of the association’s legal team involved in drafting and implementing the new constitution.

He was also part of the core ACA team responsible for hosting the first-ever T20 international match between India and Australia at the new ACA Stadium, Barsapara, in October 2017, followed by an ODI between India and the West Indies the next year.

In January 2019, Saikia was elected unopposed as Secretary and a member of the first Apex Council of ACA under the new constitution. In this role, he and the other council members introduced several administrative reforms, including the establishment of a professional office structure to improve financial and organisational processes.

Together with the Apex Council, he helped implement structural changes in tournament organisation and coaching programmes within the state. Initiatives such as the Assam Premier Club Championship—featuring over 6,500 registered players and more than 300 clubs—along with inter-university and inter-institution tournaments were introduced during his tenure.

As Secretary, Saikia also worked to expand women’s cricket in Assam. The Challengers Trophy for women and the inter-district Kanaklata Barua Trophy were launched during this period to create more competitive opportunities.

He played a role in establishing the ACA Cricket Academy in 2020, which began its residential coaching programme in 2021. Saikia continues to serve as the Academy’s Member Secretary.

During his tenure of a little over three years, including the two years affected by the COVID-19 pandemic, the ACA developed 23 cricket grounds and related infrastructure across Assam. Notable projects include the Amingaon Cricket Ground (a First-Class venue), the North Guwahati Ground, Furkating Cricket Ground in Golaghat, Tezpur University Ground, Assam Agriculture University Ground, Umrangso Cricket Ground, Barpeta Cricket Stadium, Barhampur Cricket Ground, Nagaon. Other significant projects included infrastructure improvements at Nehru Stadium, Guwahati, Charaideo, Nazira, Mulukgaon, Dhubri, Biswanath among few others.

== BCCI Joint Secretary ==
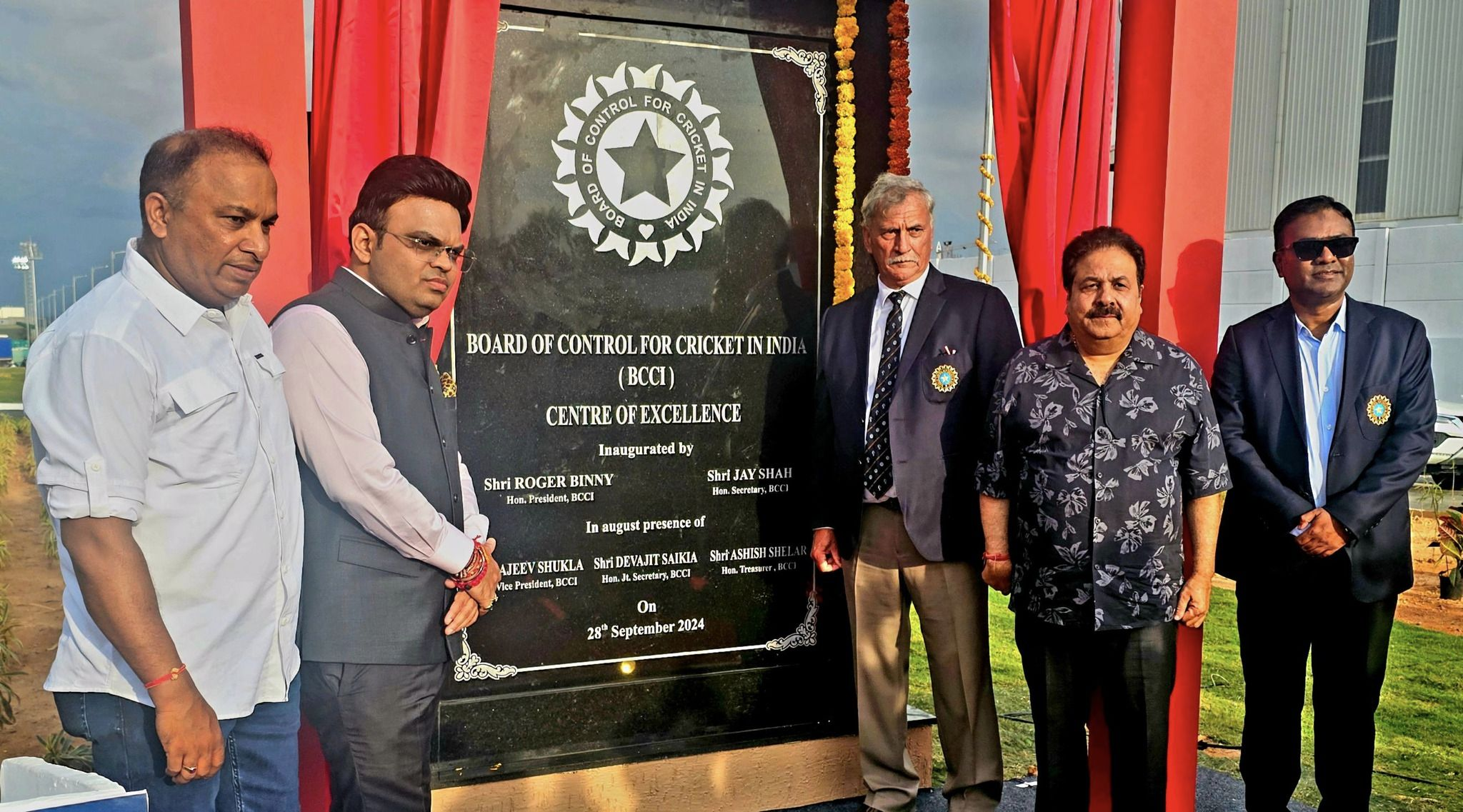
BCCI Joint Secretary Devajit Saikia (extreme left) with BCCI Secretary Jay Shah, BCCI President Roger Binny and others during the inauguration of the Centre of Excellence of National Cricket Academy in Bengaluru.

On 18 October 2022, he was elected Joint Secretary of the BCCI and a member of the Apex Council of the Premier Sports Organization of the world. During his tenure as Secretary of BCCI, he participated in several administrative initiatives under the leadership of Jay Shah.

== Role at Guwahati Sports Association (GSA) ==
On 6 May 2023, Saikia was elected General Secretary of the Guwahati Sports Association (GSA). In this role, he oversaw the drafting and adoption of a revised constitution to introduce organisational reforms. Within two months, the new constitution was implemented, after which the existing body resigned and a new one was elected under the updated framework, with Saikia retaining his position for a four-year term.

In the early months of his tenure, Saikia helped introduce age-group football tournaments aimed at supporting youth development in Guwahati. The GSA launched the Youth and Kids League for players in the Under-7, Under-9, Under-11, Under-13, Under-15 and Under-17 categories. The association also separated club teams from office teams in the GSA league and restructured the league into A, B and C divisions, replacing the earlier Super League format.

He also contributed to the introduction of the Guwahati Premier Football League, a tournament designed to enhance competitive football among local clubs and institutions, which drew significant attendance at Judges' Field in its inaugural year.

On 27 September, Saikia announced that the iconic Bordoloi Trophy football tournament would be revamped and held in a new format from January 2025. The planned three-month event is expected to include more than 5,600 players representing 284 clubs from across Assam.

== Other activities ==
Saikia has undertaken several long-distance motorcycle journeys both within India and abroad, including Route 66 in the United States (2024), Spiti Valley (2023), Ladakh (2016), Southern Thailand, and parts of France (1998).

He has also completed high-altitude treks, including Everest Base Camp (2019), Annapurna Base Camp (2022), Dzongri (2015), and Sandakpu (2001).

In 2017, he undertook an expedition to the North Pole.

On 14 October 2025, Saikia delivered a TEDx Talks at TEDx Royal Global University, discussing his journey in cricket.
