= Nehru Maidan, Duliajan =

Sport stadium in Duliajan, India

Nehru Maidan
- Oil India Ground
- Former names: Nehru Stadium
- Location: Duliajan, Assam
- Owner: Oil India
- Capacity: 10,000
- Surface: Grass

Construction
- Opened: 1964

Tenants
- Oil India FC (1964–present); Assam State Premier League (selected matches)

Nehru Maidan or Oil India Ground is a multi-purpose sport stadium used mostly for football matches, located in Duliajan, Assam. The ground is owned and managed by Oil India.

It is the home ground of Oil India FC. This ground has hosted a number of national and state level football tournaments. District level cricket tournaments have also been hosted here. It can host 10,000 spectators.
