= Numaligarh Refinery Township =

- city
- Location in Assam, India Numaligarh Refinery Township (India)
- Coordinates: 26°34′44″N 93°47′03″E
- Country: India
- State: Assam
- District: Golaghat

Population (2001)
  - Total: 7,022

Languages
  - Official: Assamese
- Time zone: UTC+5:30 (IST)
- Vehicle registration: AS

Numaligarh Refinery Township is a census town in Golaghat district in the Indian state of Assam.

As of 2001 India census[1], Numaligarh Refinery Township had a population of 1,500. Males constitute 52% of the population and females 48%. Numaligarh Refinery Township has an average literacy rate of 100%, and female literacy is 100%. In Numaligarh Refinery Township, 16% of the population is under six years of age.

Numaligarh Refinery Limited, known as "Assam Accord Refinery", has established a Butterfly ecosystem in the vicinity of its township. The Butterfly valley is spread over 15 acres (61,000 m^{2}) land surrounded by small hillocks, near the Deopahar hills.

The Township is also home to the prestigious Delhi Public School Numaligarh, which caters to the educational needs of the students in the township, as well as to the children from nearby towns, districts, and states.

But, the Township has also been subjected to scrutiny, as there are allegations that it was established in an active Elephant Corridor. Frequent sightings of elephants, leopards, and other wild animals inside the township, make the allegations more concrete.
