= United Chirang Duar FC =

Indian association football club

United Chirang Duar
- Full name: United Chirang Duar Football Club
- Nickname: Chirang Duar FC
- Short name: UCDFC
- Founded: 2021; 5 years ago
- Stadium: SAI Stadium
- Owner: Shanti Puspa Basumatary
- Head coach: Bakul Boro
- League: Assam State Premier League
| Home colours | Away colours | Third colours |

United Chirang Duar Football Club is an Indian professional football club based in Runikhata, Chirang district, Bodoland, Assam. It is the first professional club from Bodoland to participate in I-League 2 qualifiers. The club was qualified to play in the tournament after beating Elevenstar Club in the qualifying round organised by Assam Football Association. It currently competes in I-League 3 and the Assam State Premier League.

== History ==
United Chirang Duar FC is established in 2021 in Runikhata village of Chirang in Bodoland Territorial Region in Indian state of Assam.

United Chirang Duar has won many trophies in and out of Assam since its formation. It is the first club from Bodoland region to participate in I-League 2 qualifiers after they defeated Elevenstar Club in the qualifying round organized by Assam Football Association. The club later went on to participate in I-League 3, in its inaugural edition.

== Current squad ==
=== First-team squad ===
As of 13 November 2023

Note: Flags indicate national team as defined under FIFA eligibility rules; some limited exceptions apply. Players may hold more than one non-FIFA nationality.

| No. | Pos. | Nation | Player |
|---|---|---|---|
| 1 | GK | IND | Khwmdwn Brahma |
| 3 | DF | IND | Danswrang Basumatary |
| 4 | DF | IND | Didwm Hazowary (captain) |
| 7 | FW | IND | Jigyas Deka |
| 15 | FW | IND | Diner Narzinari |
| 16 | FW | IND | Musukha Narzary |
| 17 | MF | IND | Irakdau Khakhlari |
| 19 | MF | IND | Timothi Narzary |
| 20 | FW | IND | Nicodim Narzary |
| 21 | GK | IND | Birkhang Daimary |
| 22 | DF | IND | Rakesh Pradhan |
| 23 | MF | IND | Ajanta Rabha |
| 26 | DF | IND | Gagandeep Mewa Singh |

| No. | Pos. | Nation | Player |
|---|---|---|---|
| 27 | FW | IND | Arjun Mardi |
| 32 | GK | IND | Megraj Basumatary |
| 35 | DF | IND | Juwel Ahmed Mazumder |
| 39 | DF | IND | Suvo Biswas |
| 45 | DF | IND | Ringkhang Daimary |
| 46 | FW | IND | Chiranjeet Gogoi |
| 55 | FW | IND | Maneshwar Mushahary |
| 99 | MF | IND | Situ Basumatary |

== Honours ==
=== League ===
- Assam State Premier League
  - Runners-up (1): 2023–24

=== Cup ===
- Bordoloi Trophy
  - Runners-up (1): 2023
- ATPA Shield
  - Champions (1): 2023
- Bodoland Martyrs Gold Cup
  - Champions (1): 2022
- Daoharu Mungkhlong Football Trophy
  - Champions (1): 2021

== See also ==
- List of football clubs in Assam
- Assam State Premier League
- Assam Football Association
- Bodoland FC
