= Jorhat Town Club =

- Full name: Jorhat Town Club
- Nickname: Town Club
- Founded: June 7, 2011; 15 years ago
- Ground: Jorhat Stadium
- Capacity: 25,000
- League: Assam State Premier League; Jorhat Super Division Football League
Home colours	Away colours

Jorhat Town Club is an Indian professional football club based in Jorhat, Assam. Founded in 2011, the club competes in the Assam State Premier League (ASPL) and also in the Jorhat Super Division Football League. The club plays its home matches at Jorhat Stadium.

== History ==
The club was officially registered with the All India Football Federation (AIFF) on June 7, 2011. It quickly became a focal point for football in Upper Assam, representing the Jorhat district in the reorganized Assam State Premier League. In 2025, the club reached the final of the ATPA Shield, one of India's oldest football tournaments, after a 1–0 victory over Assam Rifles. They ultimately finished as runners-up after a 1–3 loss to Football 4 Change (F4C) Manipur in the final held at Jorhat Stadium. The club won the 2025-26 Jorhat Super Division Football League by defeating Jorhat Victorious FC 5–2 in the final match held at Jorhat Stadium.

== Current squad ==
As of 21 September 2026

Note: Flags indicate national team as defined under FIFA eligibility rules; some limited exceptions apply. Players may hold more than one non-FIFA nationality.

No.	Pos.	Nation	Player
1	GK	IND	Rohit Roy
2	GK	IND	Diganta Borah
3	DF	IND	Bhaskar Gogoi (Captain)
4	DF	IND	Koustav Saikia
6	DF	IND	Ambar Chetry
—	DF	IND	Komolson Rongpher
—	DF	IND	Nitul Dutta
—	DF	IND	Debasish Saikia
—	DF	IND	Mondeep Deuri
—	DF	IND	Wasik Ahmed
8	MF	IND	Sanathoi Singh
—	MF	IND	Sukham Yoihenba Singh

No.	Pos.	Nation	Player
—	MF	IND	Nilim
—	MF	IND	Nabajit Gogoi
—	FW		Joseph
9	FW	IND	Mayukh Gogoi
7	FW	IND	Pranjal Bhumij
—	FW	IND	Ripunjay Deuri
—	FW	IND	Vishal Robidas
—	FW	IND	Ajay Doimari
11	FW	IND	Vivek Gurung

== Honours ==
- Captain Jintu Gogoi Vir Chakra Memorial Tournament
  - (gold) Winners: 2018
- ATPA Shield
  - (silver) Runners-up: 2025, 2026
- Late Chidananda Bora & Avani Prasad Bora Memorial Trophy
  - Semi-finalists: 2025
