= Jorhat Stadium =

Multi-purpose stadium in Jorhat, India

- Interactive map of Jorhat Stadium
- Full name: Jorhat Stadium
- Location: Jorhat, Assam
- Coordinates: 26°45′18″N 94°12′25″E
- Owner: Board of Sports of Assam
- Operator: Jorhat District Sports Association, Board of Sports of Assam
- Capacity: 25,000
- Surface: Grass

Construction
- Opened: 1950
- Renovated: 2014
- Cost: ₹ 6 crore

Tenant
- Jorhat Town Club

Jorhat Stadium is a multi-purpose stadium located in Jorhat, Assam. This is the oldest stadium of Assam, inaugurated in 1950. The stadium is a venue for cricket and football tournaments. The first Ranji Trophy match in Assam was held at Jorhat Stadium in 1949–50. The stadium is owned by the Board of Sports of Assam and run by the Jorhat District Sports Association.

Jorhat Stadium has earthen gallery on the north and east side, designed by late Abani Mohan Choudhury. The stadium is the main venue for the ATPA Shield, an annual premier football tournament, involving clubs from Northeast India and across the country. The tournament was first held at this stadium in 1960. The Assam State Premier League team, Jorhat Town Club uses the stadium as its home ground.

== See also ==
- Jorhat District Sports Association Ground
- Jorhat Gymkhana Club
