= Bharat PetroResources =

Indian company

- Type: Central Public Sector Undertaking
- Industry: Oil and gas
- Headquarters: Mumbai, Maharashtra, India

Bharat PetroResources Limited (BPRL) is an Indian oil and gas exploration and production company and a wholly owned subsidiary of Bharat Petroleum Corporation Limited (BPCL). Established in 2006, the company serves as BPCL's upstream hydrocarbon arm and is engaged in the exploration, development, and production of crude oil and natural gas assets in India and abroad. BPRL is headquartered in Mumbai, Maharashtra.

As of March 2026, the company held participating interests in 15 oil and gas blocks, comprising eight blocks in India and seven overseas assets across Brazil, the United Arab Emirates, Mozambique and Indonesia. BPRL also holds indirect interests in producing oil and gas assets in Russia through consortium investments.

== History ==
BPRL was incorporated in October 2006 as a wholly owned subsidiary of Bharat Petroleum Corporation Limited to expand BPCL's presence in the upstream petroleum sector and secure long-term energy resources. The company was established to undertake exploration and production activities both within India and internationally.

Since its formation, BPRL has acquired interests in exploration and production assets through participation in licensing rounds, direct acquisitions, and international partnerships. Its portfolio includes assets in various stages of exploration, appraisal, development, and production.

== Operations ==
=== India ===
BPRL's domestic exploration portfolio is spread across several sedimentary basins including the Cambay Basin, Cauvery Basin and Assam-Arakan Basin. The company holds interests in blocks awarded under the New Exploration Licensing Policy (NELP), Discovered Small Field (DSF) Bid Round-I and Open Acreage Licensing Policy (OALP) Round-I.

=== Brazil ===
BPRL's presence in Brazil is managed through BPRL Brasil Limitada (formerly IBV Brasil Petróleo Limitada). The company holds participating interests in offshore hydrocarbon concessions in Brazil's deep-water basins.

In the BM-SEAL-11 Concession located in the Sergipe-Alagoas Basin, BPRL Brasil holds a 40% participating interest, while Petrobras acts as operator with a 60% interest. The discovery was declared commercial in 2021 and development activities continued during FY 2025–26, including progress toward floating production, storage and offloading (FPSO) deployment. First production is targeted around 2031.

The company also holds a 35.71% participating interest in the BM-C-30 Concession in the Campos Basin.

In August 2026, BPRL completed the acquisition of Videocon's remaining shareholding in IBV Brasil Petróleo Limitada, following which the company was renamed BPRL Brasil Limitada.

=== United Arab Emirates ===
BPRL participates in upstream activities in Abu Dhabi through Urja Bharat Pte. Limited, a joint venture between BPRL and Indian Oil Corporation Limited. The venture was awarded interests in Abu Dhabi Onshore Block 1.

In January 2026, oil discoveries were announced in the concession area following successful testing of exploration wells in the Shilaif and Habshan reservoirs, marking a significant milestone in the block's exploration programme.

=== Russia ===
BPRL, together with Oil India Limited and Indian Oil Corporation Limited, participates in Russian upstream assets through consortium companies Vankor India Pte. Ltd. (VIPL) and Taas India Pte. Ltd. (TIPL).

Through VIPL, the consortium holds a 23.9% stake in JSC Vankorneft, while TIPL holds a 29.9% stake in LLC Taas-Yuryakh Neftegazodobycha (TYNGD). These entities are associated with producing oil and gas fields in Eastern Siberia.

=== Mozambique ===
BPRL holds an interest in Offshore Area 1 in Mozambique, one of the major natural gas developments in East Africa. The asset forms part of the company's international exploration and development portfolio.

=== Indonesia ===
The company's overseas portfolio also includes participation in the Nunukan Block in Indonesia.

== Corporate structure ==
BPRL is a wholly owned subsidiary of Bharat Petroleum Corporation Limited, a Maharatna Central Public Sector Enterprise under the Ministry of Petroleum and Natural Gas, Government of India. BPRL is headed by a Managing Director & CEO.

== Board of directors ==
- Shri. Vikas – Managing Director
- Shri. Kamal Chopra – Director (Finance)
- Shri. Sanjay Khanna – Director and C&MD of BPCL
- Shri. Vetsa Ramakrishna Gupta – Director
- Shri. Rakesh Pal – Government Director
