= Assam Police FC =

- Full name: Assam Police Football Club
- Nickname: The Policemen
- Founded: 1998
- Ground: Nehru Stadium
- Capacity: 15,000
- Owner: Assam Police
- Head coach: Jewel Bey
- League: Guwahati Premier Football League; Assam State Premier League
Home colours	Away colours

Assam Police Football Club, also known as Assam Police Football Team (formerly known as Assam Police Blues and Assam Police AC), is an Indian institutional football club based in Guwahati, Assam. The club currently competes in the Assam State Premier League and Guwahati Premier Football League. It has won the Assam State Premier League title in 2013–14 season.

== History ==
The Assam Police Football Club was formed as Assam Police AC and based in Dergaon at the Assam Police Reserve. In 1971, the team defeated the Mohammedan SC in the final of the Bordoloi Trophy. In 1981, they upset Goa's Dempo SC in that premier tournament's final. Notable players who have represented the club include Gilbertson Sangma, Kalimuddin Ahmed, Subir Choudhury, and Jewel Bey, among others. In 2001, the club shifted its base from Dergaon to Guwahati and changed its name to Assam Police Blues. The club has also appeared in the two seasons of National Football League II (NFL 2nd Division), then second tier of Indian football league system in 1998-99 and 2006-07. It won the 2013-14 season of the top division Assam State Premier League. In 2023, the club dropped the word Blues from its name and returned to the original name. The club also regularly competes in Bordoloi Trophy, ATPA Shield and other state-level club tournaments.

== Current squad ==
As of 20 December 2023

Note: Flags indicate national team as defined under FIFA eligibility rules; some limited exceptions apply. Players may hold more than one non-FIFA nationality.

No.	Pos.	Nation	Player
31	GK	IND	Mulya Rabha (Captain)
5		IND	Bishwajit Boro
14		IND	Ratna Dev Rabha
6	DF	IND	Subhakshan Rabha
24		IND	N Bikash Singh
7		IND	Pinkul Basumatary
21		IND	Bitupan Deka
12	MF	IND	Bilson Daimary
17		IND	Nabonit Buragohain
9		IND	Rishab Pradhan
11		IND	November Basumatary

No.	Pos.	Nation	Player
30	GK	IND	Parag Das
20		IND	Durlav Das
22		IND	Biju Kumar Rabha
2		IND	Bhupen Teron
3		IND	Amarjyoti Deori
16		IND	Dilku Narzary
13		IND	Tultul Chutia
15		IND	Paishring Ardao
8		IND	Rajkumar Panging

== Honours ==
=== League ===
- Assam State Premier League

(gold) Champions (1): 2013–14
(silver) Runners-up (1): 2009–10

- Assam Club Championship

(gold) Champions (2) 1998, 2005-06

- GSA Super Division Football League

(gold) Champions (3) 2004, 2005, 2006

=== Cup ===
- Bordoloi Trophy

Winners (5): 1960, 1971, 1981, 1995, 1997
(silver) Runners-up (1): 1988

- ATPA Shield

Winners (3) 1971, 1982, 1983
(silver) Runners-up (3): 1990, 2002, 2017

- Independence Day Cup

(silver) Runners-up (1): 2006

- Oil India Gold Cup

(silver) Runners-up (1): 2005

- Bodoland Martyrs Gold Cup

(silver) Runners-up (1): 2016

- Amba Medhi Football Tournament

Winners (4): 1988, 1996, 1999, 2003

- Sohanlal Dugar Shield

(silver) Runners-up (1): 2003

== See also ==
- List of football clubs in Assam
- Assam Football Association
