= ASEB Sports Club =

Indian association football club

ASEB
- Full name: Assam State Electricity Board Sports Club
- Nickname: The Powermen
- Short name: ASEBSC
- Founded: 1975; 51 years ago
- Ground: Nehru Stadium
- Capacity: 15,000
- Owner(s): APDCL; AEGCL; APGCL
- Head coach: Ganesh Rai
- League: Guwahati Premier Football League
Home colours	Away colours

Assam State Electricity Board Sports Club, commonly referred to as A.S.E.B Sports Club, or simply ASEB SC, is an Indian multi-sports club based in Guwahati, Assam. The club currently competes in Guwahati Premier Football League and other big club football tournaments include Bordoloi Trophy, ATPA Shield and Independence Day Cup. ASEB SC previously competed in the National Football League II (NFL 2nd Division), then second tier of the Indian football league system and the state's top division Assam State Premier League.

== History ==
ASEB Sports Club was founded in 1975 to promote and encourage sports activities among its members. It has won most number of titles in the GSA Super Division Football League. The club also participated in the National Football League II (NFL 2nd Division), then second tier of Indian football league system in the 2001–02, 2002–03, 2003–04, 2004-05 seasons. The three successor companies of erstwhile Assam State Electricity Board - Assam Power Distribution Company Limited (APDCL), Assam Electricity Grid Corporation Limited (AEGCL) and Assam Power Generation Corporation Limited (APGCL) are the owners of the club.

== Home ground ==
ASEB SC plays its home matches at the Nehru Stadium in Guwahati, which has a capacity of 15,000 spectators.

== Current squad ==
As of 8 March 2025

Note: Flags indicate national team as defined under FIFA eligibility rules; some limited exceptions apply. Players may hold more than one non-FIFA nationality.

No.	Pos.	Nation	Player
1	GK	IND	Gonesh Boro
2	DF	IND	Hesron Baglari
3	DF	IND	Bishnu Rabha (Captain)
4	DF	IND	Hiteshwar Kaman
5	DF	IND	Mangal Besra
6	DF	IND	Jitul Boruah
7	MF	IND	Rohit Phukan
8	FW	IND	Papu Deori
9	FW	IND	Sanswrang Basumatary
10	MF	IND	Falguni Basumatary
11	FW	IND	Somiron Goyari

No.	Pos.	Nation	Player
12	DF	IND	Hiteswar Hazowary
13	MF	IND	Ripu Narzary
15	FW	IND	Karma Narzary
16	MF	IND	Rahul Das
17	DF	IND	Sujalal Brahma
19	MF	IND	Rahan Brahma
20	MF	IND	Danial Daimary
22	DF	IND	Gunin Charingia
27	DF	IND	Akash Basumatary
31	GK	IND	Bishal Sahu

== Honours ==
=== League ===
- Assam Club Championship

(gold) Champions (2) 2004, 2006
(silver) Runners-up (4): 2001, 2002, 2003, 2007

- GSA Super Division Football League

(gold) Champions (12) Latest in 2022

=== Cup ===
- Bordoloi Trophy

Winners (5): 1988, 2006, 2009, 2014, 2021
(silver) Runners-up (4): 1999, 2002, 2008, 2019

- ATPA Shield

Winners (5): 2000, 2001, 2006, 2011, 2022
(silver) Runners-up (3): 2004, 2008, 2019

- Independence Day Cup

Winners (4): 1986, 1995, 2015, 2021
(silver) Runners-up (1): 2016

- Bodousa Cup

Winners (1): 2024
(silver) Runners-up (2): 2016, 2020
(silver) Runners-up (1): 2014

- Oil India Gold Cup

Champions (1): 2012

- Bodoland Martyrs Gold Cup

(silver) Runners-up (1): 2010

- Amba Medhi Football Tournament

Winners (1): 2002

- Sohanlal Dugar Shield

Winners (1): 2000

=== Others ===
- Naroram Barman Memorial Trophy

Winners: 2010

- NN Bhattacharya Knock-Out Football Tournament

Winners (2): 2005, 2015

== See also ==
- List of football clubs in Assam
- Assam Football Association
