= Gauhati Town Club =

Indian association football club

- Full name: Gauhati Town Club
- Nickname: The Rhinos
- Short name: GTC
- Founded: 1906; 120 years ago
- Ground: Judges Field; GTC Football Academy Ground
- Capacity: 5,000
- President: Himanta Biswa Sarma
- Coach: Kamala Kt Singh
- League: Guwahati Premier Football League; GSA A Division Football League; Youth League
- Website: gauhatitownclub.com
Home colours	Away colours

Gauhati Town Club is an Indian multi sports club based in Guwahati, Assam. Founded in 1906, the club had participated in the I-League 2, then second highest level football in India, for two seasons. It currently plays in the Guwahati Premier Football League, GSA A Division Football League and Youth League.

== History ==
=== 1906–2010 ===
Gauhati Town Club is one of the oldest and the premier sporting organizations in the north-east. It was born at the initiative of a dedicated group of sports-lovers including Captain L. B. Scott, I.M.S., who was a civil surgeon, Dr. H.K. Das, an assistant surgeon and founding secretary of the club; Sir Saiyid Saadullah, an eminent lawyer, and Khan Saheb Khalilur Rahman. Significantly, the club was essentially instrumental in introducing the coveted Bordoloi Trophy tournament, initially played at the Judges' Field from 1952 to 1957. Ranji Trophy cricket matches were also played at the same venue.

=== 2010–present ===
On 21 January 2010, it was announced that Juliano Silveira Fontana, a professional Brazilian football coach, has been appointed as the head coach of the academy. He later coached senior team in the I-League 2nd Division.

In February 2011, it was announced that Gauhati Town Club will participate in 2011 I-League 2nd Division. Team finished season at the bottom of the table and did not gain promotion to the 2011 I-League 2nd Division final round. They participated in the 2012 I-League 2nd Division and finished 7th in the group stage. The Gauhati Town Club Football Academy was set up to identify, train and nurture the local talents of Northeast India at grassroots level. It has highly equipped infrastructure.

== Players ==
=== First-team squad ===
As of 17 December 2023

Note: Flags indicate national team as defined under FIFA eligibility rules; some limited exceptions apply. Players may hold more than one non-FIFA nationality.

No.	Pos.	Nation	Player
1	GK	IND	MM Mustakin
16	DF	IND	Komolson Rongphar
4	DF	IND	Umesh Kalindi
5		IND	Sudem Narzary (Captain)
6		IND	Jayanta Baglary
18		IND	A Sanathai Singh
7	DF	IND	Biplab Nayak
8		IND	Sanjib Deka
10		IND	S Simren Singh
11	MF	IND	Anupam Borgohain
17	FW	IND	Shrinivash Singh

No.	Pos.	Nation	Player
31	GK	IND	Manoj Barman
27		IND	Prasant Baruah
23	DF	IND	Krinal Rabha
3		IND	Md Sabir
14	MF	IND	Rahul Pradhan
19		IND	Bryant Dihingia
22		IND	Benhar Hlyehho
24		IND	Dhiraj Rajbangshi
26		IND	Alfred Hojai
29		IND	Paochin Mong

=== GTC Academy team ===
Gauhati Town Club has its academy team, consisting of youth players. Their U17 also competed in 2022–23 U-17 Youth Cup.

Note: Flags indicate national team as defined under FIFA eligibility rules; some limited exceptions apply. Players may hold more than one non-FIFA nationality.

No.	Pos.	Nation	Player
21	GK	IND	Akash Swargiary
1	GK	IND	Gautam Brahma
2	DF	IND	Phungsa Daimari
11	DF	IND	Rahul Gogoi
20	DF	IND	Wankitbok Mawlong
4	DF	IND	Sowrab Kr Dey
22	DF	IND	Banteilang Khapew
3	DF	IND	Ruhit Boro
12	MF	IND	Jemson Teron
6	MF	IND	Himitson Terang
8	MF	IND	Sudeepta Konwar
18	MF	IND	Nishan Barman
19	MF	IND	Ajay Baro

No.	Pos.	Nation	Player
7	MF	IND	Dhrubajyoti Talukdar
10	FW	IND	Parash Thapa
16	FW	IND	Udayaditya Rabha
17	FW	IND	David Tirkey
15	FW	IND	T Shemphang Malich
9	FW	IND	Pragyan Bora

== Management ==
As of 30 August 2021

Office	Name
President	(India) Dr. Himanta Biswa Sarma
Working president	(India) Mukul Chandra Gogoi
Vice-presidents	(India) Pranab Sharma (India) Ankur Dutta (India) Samarjit Durga Neog (India) Tanmoy Jyoti Mahanta (India) Bulbul Choudhury (India) Paragmoni Mahanta
General secretary	(India) Devajit Saikia
Assistant secretary	(India) Salil Sinha
Treasurer	(India) Navroze Munwar
Sports & event secretary	(India) Pompa Chakravarty
Football secretary	(India) Akhtaruddin Ahmed
Cricket secretary	(India) Deep Bora

== Honours ==
=== League ===
- Assam Club Championship
  - Champions (1): 2001
- GSA Super Division Football League
  - Champions (1): 2002

=== Cup ===
- Bordoloi Trophy
  - Winners (3): 1954, 1956, 1963
  - Runners-up (1): 1957
- ATPA Shield
  - Winners (1): 1962
- Amba Medhi Football Tournament
  - Runners-up (2): 2001, 2002

== See also ==
- List of football clubs in Assam
- Assam Football Association
