= Assam Cricket Association =

Governing body of cricket in Assam, India

- Sport: Cricket
- Jurisdiction: State
- Abbreviation: ACA
- Founded: 1948; 78 years ago
- Regional affiliation: Board of Control for Cricket in India
- Affiliation date: 1960
- Headquarters: Assam Cricket Association Stadium, Guwahati - 781018
- Location: Barsapara, Guwahati
- President: Taranga Gogoi
- CEO: Pritam Mahanta
- Secretary: Sanatan Das

Official website
- www.assamcricket.com
- (India)

Assam Cricket Association (ACA) is the governing body of cricket activities in the Assam state of India. It is affiliated to the Board of Control for Cricket in India. The headquarters of ACA is at the Assam Cricket Association Stadium, Barsapara, Guwahati. It administers Assam cricket team, Assam women's cricket team and its junior state teams.

== History ==
Since Assam played its first home match in 1948, it has also played first-class home matches in chronological order Shillong, Jorhat, Nowgong, Dibrugarh, Silchar, Karimganj, Hailakandi, Mangaldoi and Tinsukia.

Until the 2002–03 season, when the zonal system was abandoned, Assam formed part of Eastern Zone. It has not seen much success in the Ranji Trophy circuit but won their plate group in 2006/07 before losing the semi-final to Orissa, despite having not won a first-class match in the previous two seasons.

In 2009–10 season Assam entered into elite group of the Ranji Trophy. In 2009-10 Ranji Trophy season Assam topped the plate group and subsequently progressed to the Super League. However, in the 2010–11 season, it ended at the bottom of its group in the Super League and face relegation to Plate League for the next season. In the 2012-13 edition of Vijay Hazare Trophy Assam played extremely well and finished runners up. In 2014-15 Ranji season Assam again promoted to Group A level.

The foundation stone of the Barsapara Cricket Stadium was laid by Chief Minister of Assam Tarun Gogoi in June 2004 and he again laid the foundation stone of the club house and stand of the stadium in July 2007 in the presence of then Board of Control for Cricket in India secretary Niranjan Shah. It was inaugurated for international cricket in 2017.

Himanta Biswa Sarma became the president of the Assam Cricket Association in June 2016 when his party man Pradip Buragohain became the secretary. Dr Sarma was also longest serving vice president of the association serving from 2002 to 2016. Anjan Dutta was longest serving President of Assam Cricket Association. In January 2019, Romen Dutta has been elected as the president and Ex-Ranji player Devajit Saikia was named as the secretary of Assam Cricket Association in the Annual General Meeting.

== Tournaments ==
Assam Cricket Association conducts various district, club and university level tournaments for juniors, seniors and women. Those are: Nuruddin Ahmed Trophy Senior Inter-District Cricket Tournament, Assam Premier Club Championship, Assam T20 Challengers Trophy, Nilay Dutta Inter-University Cricket Tournament, ACA Inter-Institution Cricket Tournament, JK Barooah U-19 Inter-District Cricket Tournament, RG Baruah U-16 Inter-District Cricket Tournament, Amarjit Sarma U-15 Inter-District Boys Cricket Tournament, Pulin Das Trophy U-14 Inter-District Boys Cricket Tournament, Umananda Bora U-13 Inter-District Boys Cricket Tournament, Kanaklata Baruah Inter-Zonal State Women's Cricket Championship and Kanaklata Baruah Inter-District Women's Cricket Championship.

== Home grounds ==
- Assam Cricket Association Stadium, Guwahati - hosted 2 ODIs, 2 T20Is
- Nehru Stadium, Guwahati - hosted 14 ODIs.
- Amingaon Cricket Ground, Amingaon
- Northeast Frontier Railway Stadium, Maligaon
- Satindra Mohan Dev Stadium, Silchar
- Sarbananda Sonowal Sports Complex, Dibrugarh

== Affiliated district associations ==
The affiliated district associations of Assam Cricket Association are: North-East Frontier Railway Sports Association (NFRSA), Tezpur DSA, Guwahati SA, Dibrugarh DSA, DSA Silchar, Nowgong SA, Barpeta DSA, Jorhat DSA, Bongaigaon DSA, Sivasagar DSA, Charaideo DSA, Golaghat DSA, Tinsukia DSA, Nazira DSA, Morigaon DSA, Goalpara DSA, DSA Dhubri, Biswanath Chariali DSA, DSA Karimganj, Hailakandi DSA, Karbi Anglong DSA, Dima Hasao DSA, Kaliabor DSA, Titabor DSA, Margherita DSA, Bokakhat DSA, Rangia DSA, Udalguri DSA, Kokrajhar DSA, Lakhimpur DSA, Hojai DSA, Bajali DSA, North Salmara DSA, Bilasipara DSA, Nalbari DSA, Mangaldai SA, Dhemaji DSA, Naharkatia SA and Majuli DSA.
