= Oil India FC =

Indian association football club

Oil India
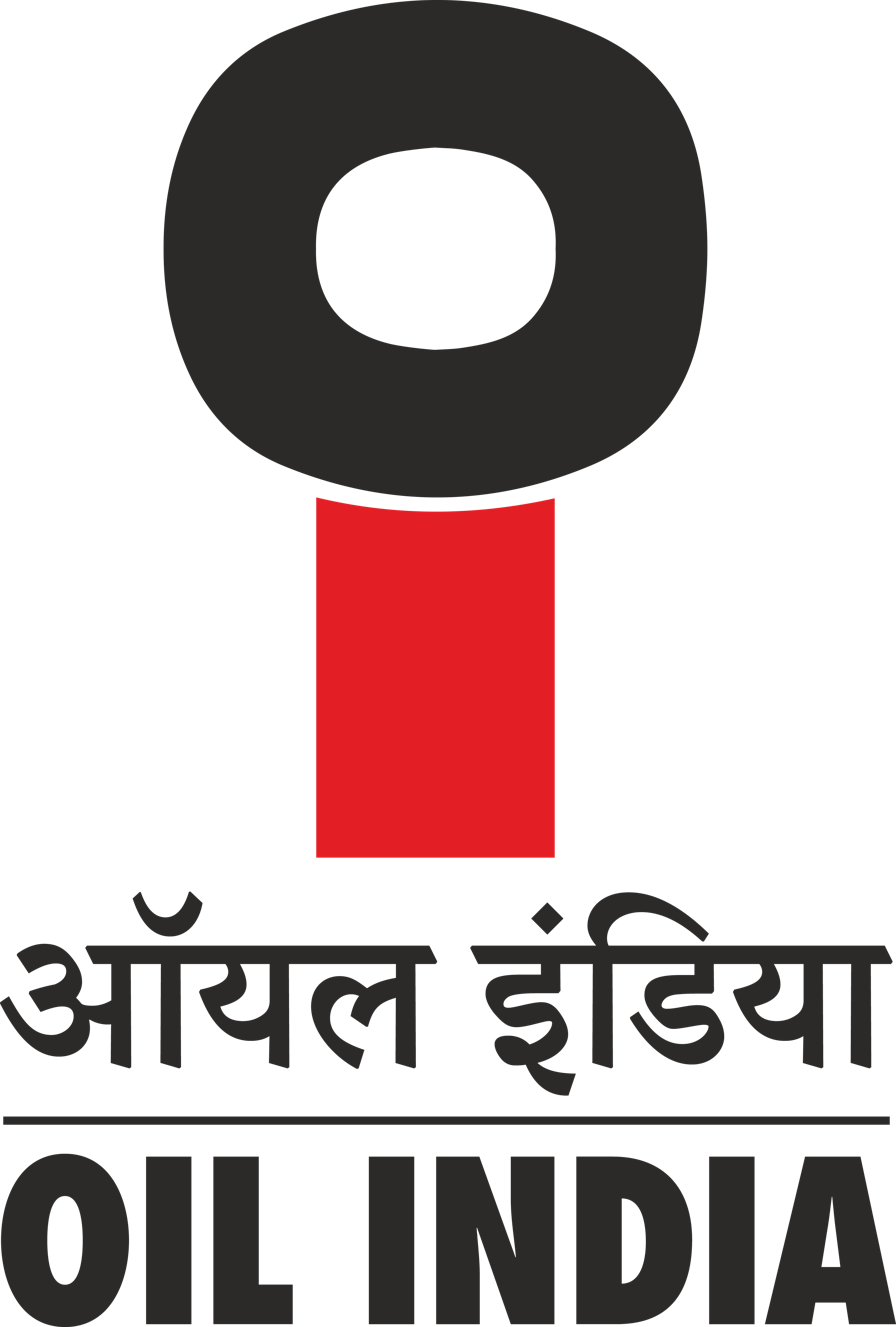
- Full name: Oil India Football Club Duliajan
- Short name: OIL, OILFC
- Founded: 1964; 62 years ago
- Ground: Nehru Maidan
- Capacity: 10,000
- Owner: Oil India
- Head coach: Mintu Boro
- League: Guwahati Premier Football League
| Home colours | Away colours |

Oil India Football Club, also known as Oil India Limited FC or simply Oil India FC, is an Indian institutional football club based in Duliajan, Assam. The club was founded by Oil India in 1964. It also participated in I-League 2nd Division, then second tier football tournament of Indian football league system, for three seasons.

Oil India FC was nominated by the Assam Football Association for 2021 I-League Qualifiers, but didn't make it to the final list approved by the AIFF. The club is a regular participant in major tournaments of the state include Guwahati Premier Football League, Bordoloi Trophy, Independence Day Cup, ATPA Shield and Oil India Gold Cup. It previously competed in the top division Assam State Premier League.

== History ==
Oil India FC is sponsored by the public sector giant Oil India Ltd, as well as Ministry of Petroleum and Natural Gas. The club was set up in 1964 at Duliajan in upper Assam, although some administrative facilities are located in Dibrugarh. They took part in the first three editions of I-League 2nd Division. In 2010 edition, Oil India FC had progressed to final round but failed to qualify for the top tier. The club is considered to be one of the top teams from the North East India.

== Stadium ==
Oil India FC plays its home matches at Nehru Maidan located in Duliajan. It has the capacity of 10,000 spectators and owned by Oil India Ltd itself.

== Current squad ==
Note: Flags indicate national team as defined under FIFA eligibility rules; some limited exceptions apply. Players may hold more than one non-FIFA nationality.

| No. | Pos. | Nation | Player |
|---|---|---|---|
| 1 | GK | IND | Arup Baruah |
| 2 | DF | IND | Fwidan Borgayary |
| 4 | DF | IND | Sishuram Chutia (Captain) |
| 5 | MF | IND | Mandila Rongmei |
| 6 | DF | IND | Kapil Boro |
| 7 | MF | IND | Rahul Das |
| 8 | MF | IND | Sagar Hang Limboo |
| 9 | FW | IND | Aman Chetri |
| 10 | FW | IND | Geremsha Basumatary |
| 32 | DF | IND | Manash Protim Gogoi |
| 13 | MF | IND | Sangson Saikia |
| 14 | DF | IND | Sunil Murmu |

| No. | Pos. | Nation | Player |
|---|---|---|---|
| 15 | FW | IND | Akrang Narzary |
| 18 | FW | IND | William Gangte |
| 17 | FW | IND | Sirandeep Moran |
| 21 | GK | IND | Nihal Das |
| 24 | DF | IND | Tupu Brahma |
| 25 | | IND | Tulya Das |
| 26 | DF | IND | Basudav Baruah |
| 29 | DF | IND | Deepjyoti Daimary |
| 30 | DF | IND | Sudem Wary |
| 31 | GK | IND | Abinash Mech |

== Kit manufacturers and shirt sponsors ==
| Period | Kit manufacturer | Title sponsor |
|---|---|---|
| | Nivia Sports | Oil India Ltd. |

== Honours ==
This is a list of honours for the Oil India FC:

=== League ===
- Assam State Premier League
  - (gold) Champions (1): 2011–12
  - (silver) Runners-up (2): 2008–09, 2010–11
- Assam Club Championship
  - (gold) Champions (3): 2002, 2003, 2007
  - (silver) Runners-up (3): 1997, 2004, 2006

=== Cup ===
- Bordoloi Trophy
  - Winners (5): 1990, 2008, 2012, 2019, 2023
  - (silver) Runners-up (4): 1979, 2003, 2018, 2021
- ATPA Shield
  - Winners (15): 1975, 1978, 1979, 1981, 1996, 1998, 1999, 2003, 2004, 2015, 2016, 2017, 2018, 2024, 2026
  - (silver) Runners-up (8): 1974, 1984, 1986, 1988, 1995, 2000, 2007, 2022
- Independence Day Cup
  - Winners (8): 1976, 1977, 1994, 2004, 2005, 2016, 2022, 2023
  - (silver) Runners-up (6): 1979, 1990, 2002, 2003, 2008–09, 2013
- Bodousa Cup
  - Winners (4): 2010, 2015, 2020, 2023
  - (silver) Runners-up (1)
- Kalinga Cup
  - Winners (1): 2006
- Amba Medhi Football Tournament
  - Winners (1): 2001
  - (silver) Runners-up (1): 2008
- Bodoland Martyrs Gold Cup
  - (silver) Runners-up (1): 2018
- Bodoland Gallants Gold Cup
  - Winners: 2017
- Oil India Gold Cup
  - Champions (3): 2005, 2008, 2009,
  - (silver) Runners-up (3): 2006, 2007, 2012
- Sohanlal Dugar Shield
  - Winners (2): 1975, 1997
  - (silver) Runners-up (3): 2002, 2014, 2015

=== Others ===
- All-India Petroleum Sports Control Board Inter-unit Championship
  - Champions (3): 2001, 2006, 2007
  - Runners-up (4): 2004, 2005, 2008, 2009
- Swargadeo Sarbananda Singha Memorial Trophy
  - Winners: 2010, 2021
- Naroram Barman Memorial Trophy
  - Winners: 2018, 2022

== See also ==
- List of football clubs in Assam
- Assam Football Association
- ONGC FC
