= Independence Day Cup (Assam) =

Association football tournament in India

- Organiser(s): Nowgong Sports Association
- Founded: 1947; 79 years ago
- Region: India
- Teams: Various
- Current champions: Asufii Football Academy (1st title)
- Most championships: Oil India (8th title)

The All India Independence Day Cup, commonly known as the Independence Day Cup, is an Indian football tournament held in Nagaon, Assam and organised by Nowgong Sports Association.

== History ==
Independence Day Cup is the oldest football tournament of Assam, first held in 1947, days after the Indian independence and gradually developed into an important competition for clubs, institutional teams, police teams and armed forces sides from across India. Over the years, well-known teams such as Mohun Bagan, East Bengal FC, Mohammedan Sporting, Oil India and Assam Rifles have participated in the competition. Initially the tournament was hosted by the Nagaon Marwari Yubak Sangha.

== Venues ==
Most of the matches are played at the Nurul Amin Stadium, Nagaon, which has the capacity of 5,000 spectators.

== Results ==
List of Independence Day Cup finals
Edition	Year	Winners	Score	Runners-up	Ref.
	1969	Mohammedan Sporting	–		
	1971	Mohammedan Sporting	–		
	1972	Mohammedan Sporting	–		
	1976	Oil India	–		
	1977	Oil India	–		
	1979	Border Security Force	–	Oil India	
	1981	Assam Rifles	–		
	1988	Mohammedan Sporting	1–0	Punjab Police	
	1993	Border Security Force	3–0	(Bangladesh) Abahani Krira Chakra	
	1994	Oil India	–		
	1996	Mohun Bagan	–	Border Security Force	
	1997	Mohun Bagan	–		
	1998	Border Security Force	2–0	(Bangladesh) Muktijoddha Sangsad	
	1999	Border Security Force	1–1 (7–6 p)	Tata Football Academy	
	2000	Indian National	1–1 (3–1 p)	Assam Regimental Centre	
	2001	NF Railway	5–0	ASEB	
	2002	East Bengal	2–0	Oil India	
	2003	SAIL, Kolkata	3–0	Oil India	
	2004	Oil India	2–0	Khidderpore Sporting Union	
	2005	Oil India	1–0	Nagaland Police	
	2006	Border Security Force	4–1	Assam Police Blues	
	2007	Mohammedan	0–0 (3–2 p)	Border Security Force	
	2008–09	Border Security Force	0–0 (6–5 p)	Oil India	
	2010	Assam Rifles	–		
	2011	SSB Ranidanga	–	Langsning	
64th	2012	Langsning	2–1	Assam Rifles	
65th	2013	Assam Rifles	4–0	Oil India	
68th	2016	Oil India	2–1	ASEB	
69th	2017	Assam Rifles	2–0	Border Security Force	
70th	2018	Border Security Force	1–1 (4–3 p)	Mohammedan	
71st	2019	Gokulam Kerala	1–0	Border Security Force	
73rd	2021	ASEB	1–1 (4–3 p)	Kerala United	
74th	2022	Oil India	1–0	Assam Rifles	
75th	2023	Oil India	2–0	ASEB	
76th	2024	Asufii FA, Manipur	2–1	Oil India	
77th	2025	ASEB	2–2 (15–14 p)	Sadar Hills FA, Manipur	

== See also ==
- Assam Football Association
- Bordoloi Trophy
- ATPA Shield
- Assam State Premier League
- Bodousa Cup
- Bodoland Martyrs Gold Cup
