= Assam Cricket Association Stadium =

International cricket stadium in Guwahati, Assam, India

- Barsapara Cricket Stadium
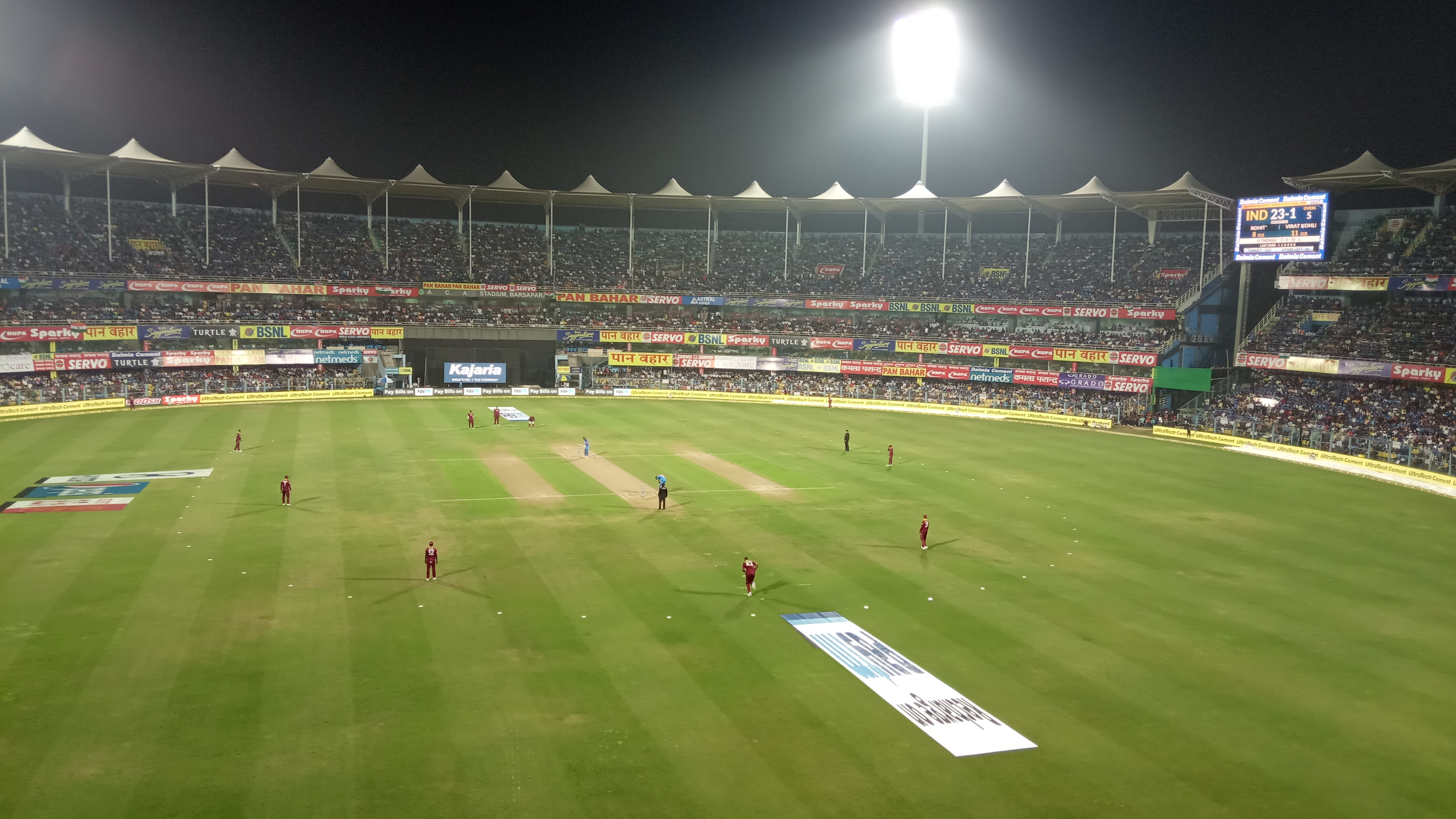
- Interactive map of Assam Cricket Association Stadium

Ground information
- Location: Barsapara, Guwahati, Assam
- Country: India
- Coordinates: 26°8′42″N 91°44′11″E
- Establishment: 2012
- Capacity: 46,000
- Owner: Assam Cricket Association
- Architect: Klorophyll (India) Sports Turf Technology & Construction Pvt. Ltd.
- Operator: Assam Cricket Association
- Tenants: Assam cricket team; India national cricket team (2017–present); Indian women's national cricket team (2019–present); Rajasthan Royals (2023-present)
- End names
- Media End; Pavilion End

International information
- Only men's Test: 22–26 November 2025: India v South Africa
- First men's ODI: 21 October 2018: India v West Indies
- Last men's ODI: 30 September 2026: India v West Indies
- First men's T20I: 10 October 2017: India v Australia
- Last men's T20I: 25 January 2026: India v New Zealand
- First women's ODI: 30 September 2025: India v Sri Lanka
- Last women's ODI: 29 October 2025: England v South Africa
- First women's T20I: 4 March 2019: India v England
- Last women's T20I: 9 March 2019: India v England
- As of 29 October 2025; Source: ESPNcricinfo

The Assam Cricket Association Stadium, also known as Barsapara Cricket Stadium and officially named Dr. Bhupen Hazarika Cricket Stadium, is a cricket stadium in Barsapara, Guwahati, Assam, India. It is the home ground of the Assam cricket team and is owned and operated by the Assam Cricket Association. The stadium has a capacity of 46,000 spectators which is extendable to 55,000, making it the 7th largest cricket stadium in India.

Former Assam chief minister Sarbananda Sonowal inaugurated the stadium on 10 October 2017. The arena hosts domestic and international cricket matches. It became India's 49th international cricket venue. The first international cricket match played here was a T20I between India and Australia in 2017, which was won by Australia. It is the largest sports stadium in north-eastern India.

It hosted the Indian Premier League's matches for the first time in April 2023, with the Rajasthan Royals playing two home games in the stadium as its second home venue. This initiative was put forth by the BCCI to have a cricketing impact in Northeast India.

== History ==
On 4 November 2012, the East Zone Senior Women's Inter-State One-Day Championship match between Assam women's cricket team and Odisha women's cricket team became the first match to be played at the ground. In the 2013-14 Ranji Trophy season, the ground hosted four matches. Assam against Kerala was the first first-class match.

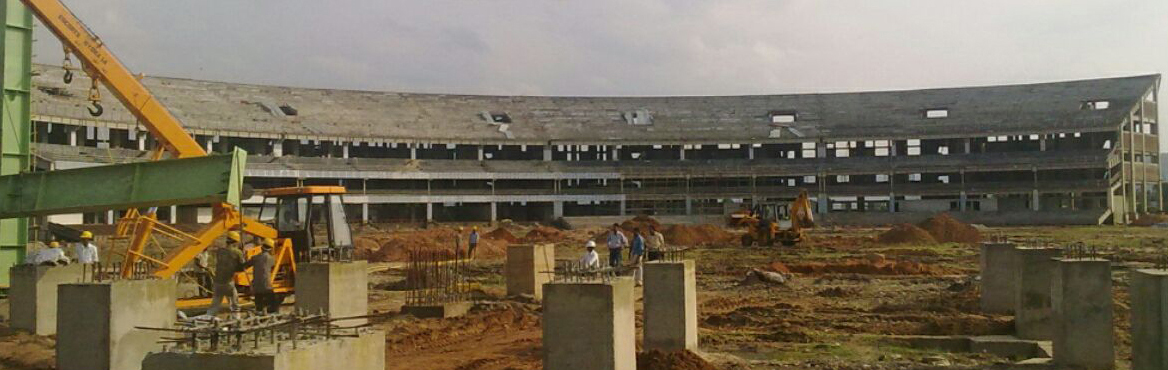
Barsapara Cricket Stadium during construction

On 10 October 2017, the stadium hosted its first T20I. The match was played between Australia and hosts India, Australia won the game by eight wickets. In this match, the newly inaugurated stadium recorded an attendance of 38,132.

The stadium hosted its first ODI on 21 October 2018. The match was played between hosts India and the West Indies cricket team. India won the match by eight wickets.

From 4 March 2019 to 9 March 2019, the ground hosted Women's International Cricket for the first time. Three Women's Twenty20 International matches were played between the England women's cricket team and the hosts Indian women's cricket team. The England women's cricket team won the WT20I series 3–0.

On 30 September 2025 the stadium hosted its first Women's ODI. The match was played between hosts India and Sri Lanka women's cricket team which was the opening match of ICC Women's Cricket World Cup 2025.

On 22 November 2025, the ground hosted its first ever Test match between India and South Africa.

== List of centuries ==
=== Key ===
- * Denotes that the batsman was not out.
- Inns. denotes the number of innings in the match.
- Balls denote the number of balls faced in an inning.
- NR denotes that the number of balls was not recorded.
- Parentheses next to the player's score denote his century number at Guwahati.
- Date refers to the date the match started.
- Result refers to the player's team result.

=== Tests ===
No.	Score	Player	Team	Balls	Inns.	Opposing team	Date	Result
1	109	Senuran Muthusamy	South Africa	206	1	India	22 November 2025	Won

=== One Day Internationals ===
No.	Score	Player	Team	Balls	Inns.	Opposing team	Date	Result
1	106	Shimron Hetmyer	West Indies	78	1	India	21 October 2018	Lost
2	140	Virat Kohli	India	107	2	West Indies	21 October 2018	Won
3	152*	Rohit Sharma	India	117	2	West Indies	21 October 2018	Won
4	113	Virat Kohli	India	87	1	Sri Lanka	10 January 2023	Won
5	108*	Dasun Shanaka	Sri Lanka	88	2	India	10 January 2023	Lost
6	101	John Campbell	West Indies	68	1	India	30 September 2026	Lost
7	104	Shai Hope	West Indies	94	1	India	30 September 2026	Lost
8	114	Amir Jangoo	West Indies	77	1	India	30 September 2026	Lost
9	223	Shubman Gill	India	133	2	West Indies	30 September 2026	Won
10	101	Rohit Sharma	India	75	2	West Indies	30 September 2026	Won

=== Twenty20 Internationals ===
No.	Score	Player	Team	Balls	Inns.	Opposing team	Date	Result
1	106*	David Miller	South Africa	47	2	India	2 October 2022	Lost
2	123*	Ruturaj Gaikwad	India	57	1	Australia	28 November 2023	Lost
3	104*	Glenn Maxwell	Australia	48	2	India	28 November 2023	Won

=== Women's One Day Internationals ===
No.	Score	Player	Team	Balls	Inns.	Opposing Team	Date	Result
1	169	Laura Wolvaardt	South Africa	143	1	England	29 October 2025	Won

== See also ==
- Nehru Stadium
- Indira Gandhi Athletic Stadium
- Northeast Frontier Railway Stadium
- List of cricket grounds by capacity
