= JCB Bhilai Brothers FC =

Indian association football club

JCB Bhilai Brothers
- Full name: JCB Bhilai Brothers Football Club
- Founded: 2004; 21 years ago
- Capacity: 30,000
- League: Bhilai Football League
Home colours	Away colours

JCB Bhilai Brothers Football Club is an Indian football club based in Bhilai, Chhattisgarh that last competed in the I-League 2nd Division.
