= ATPA Shield =

- Organiser(s): Jorhat District Sports Association
- Founded: 1955; 71 years ago
- Region: India
- Teams: 10 (in 2026)
- Current champions: Oil India (15th title)
- Most championships: Oil India (15 titles)
- 2026

The Assam Tea Planters' Association Shield, commonly known as the ATPA Shield Football Tournament or ATPA Shield, is an Indian annual football tournament held in Jorhat, Assam and organised by the Jorhat District Sports Association (JDSA). It is the third oldest football tournament of Assam after the Independence Day Cup and Bordoloi Trophy.

== History ==
Since its inception in 1955, the ATPA Shield tournament has been very popular, involving some leading clubs from northeast India and the rest of the country. Kolkata giants East Bengal, Mohammedan and Mohun Bagan, as well as Goa's Dempo have competed in the tournament. The coveted shield was donated and hosted by Assam Tea Planters' Association (ATPA). From 1968, the tournament has been conducted by Jorhat District Sports Association.

== Venue ==
The matches of ATPA Shield are played at Jorhat Stadium in Jorhat.

== Results ==
List of ATPA Shield finals
Year	Winners	Score	Runners-up	Ref.
1955	State Transport Club, Shillong	–	George Telegraph, Calcutta	
1956	Thengal Bari Club, Jorhat	–	State Transport Club, Shillong	
1958	Jorhat Police XI	–	Mokokchung District XI	
1959	Dergaon Police Club	–	Assam Rifles	
1960	Dergaon Police Club	–	Pioneer Sports, Dibrugarh	
1961	Dergaon Police Club	–	Assam Rifles	
1962	Gauhati Town Club	–	Dergaon Police Club	
1964	Dergaon Police Club	–	Orissa Textile Mills, Cuttack	
1966	Assam Rifles	–	Assam Police	
1968	Assam Police	–	Jorhat District Sporting Association	
1969	Assam Police	–	Assam Rifles	
1970	Assam Police	–	Assam Rifles	
1971	Assam Police	–	Nagaland Police	
1972	Nagaland Police	–	Thermal AC, Namrup	
1974	Assam Police	–	Oil India XI, Duliajan	
1975	Oil India XI, Duliajan	–	Assam Police	
1976	Assam Police	–	George Telegraph, Calcutta	
1977	Meghalaya Police	–	Manipur Police	
1978	Oil India XI and Assam Police (joint winners)			
1979	Oil India XI and Assam Police (joint winners)			
1981	Oil India XI, Duliajan	–	Assam Police	
1982	Assam Police	–	Nagaland Police	
1983	Assam Police	–	Nagaland Police	
1984	Assam Police	–	Oil India XI, Duliajan	
1985	Gorkha Brigade Club, Calcutta	–	Assam Rifles	
1986	Assam Police	–	Oil India XI, Duliajan	
1987	Nagaland Police	–	Thermal AC, Namrup	
1988	Assam Police	–	Oil India XI, Duliajan	
1989	Duliajan Club	–	Assam Police	
1990	Nagaland Police	–	Assam Police	
1991	ASEB, Guwahati	–	SSB, Imphal	
1992	East Bengal	–	Royal Nepal Airlines Soccer Team	
1993	Mohun Bagan	1–0	(Thailand) Bangkok Port Authority	
1995	Williamson Magor Football Academy, Monabari	–	Oil India, Duliajan	
1996	Oil India, Duliajan	–	SAIL, Calcutta	
1997	Assam Police	–	Young Amateur Club, Guwahati	
1998	Oil India, Duliajan	–	Nagaland Police	
1999	Oil India, Duliajan	1–0	Nagaland Police	
2000	ASEB, Guwahati	3–0	Oil India, Duliajan	
2001	ASEB, Guwahati	1–0	Nagaland Police	
2002	Nagaland Police	0–0 (4–2 p)	Assam Police	
2003	Oil India, Duliajan	5–2	White Dove Club	
2004	Oil India, Duliajan	1–0	ASEB, Guwahati	
2005	Nagaland Police	2–1	FCI, Guwahati	
2006	ASEB, Guwahati	2–0	Kuki FC, Kohima	
2007	Assam Rifles	1–1 (1–0) (a.e.t.)	Oil India, Duliajan	
2008	Assam Rifles	2–1	ASEB, Guwahati	
2011	ASEB, Guwahati	1–0	Seema Suraksha Bal, Siliguri	
2015	Oil India, Duliajan	2–1	Assam Rifles	
2016	Oil India, Duliajan	3–1	Shillong Lajong	
2017	Oil India, Duliajan	2–0	Assam Police Blues	
2018	Oil India, Duliajan	2–2 (6–4 p)	Sashastra Seema Bal, Siliguri	
2019	Assam Rifles	–	ASEB, Guwahati	
2022	ASEB, Guwahati	2–1	Oil India, Duliajan	
2023	United Chirang Duar, Chirang	2–0	Mariani Sub Sports Association	
2024	Oil India, Duliajan	2–1 (a.e.t.)	Assam Rifles	
2025	Football 4 Change, Manipur	3–1	Jorhat Town Club	
2026	Oil India	1–1 (5–4 p)	Jorhat Town Club	

== See also ==
- Assam Football Association
- Bordoloi Trophy
- Independence Day Cup (Assam)
- Assam State Premier League
- Bodousa Cup
- Bodoland Martyrs Gold Cup
