= Duliajan =

Duliajan DJN
- Town
- Duliajan Oil Township
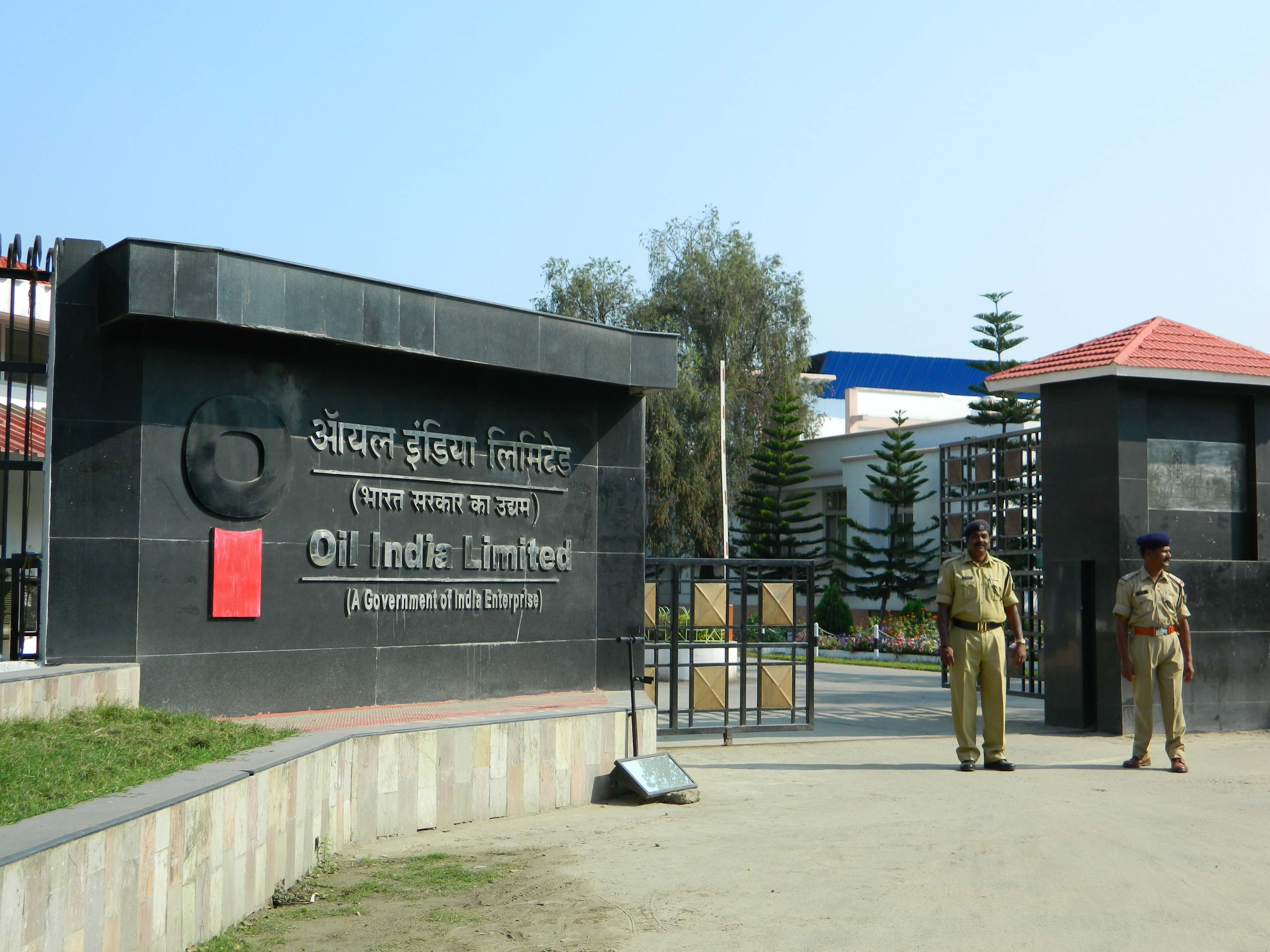
- Fields headquarters of Oil India Limited at Duliajan
- Nickname: "Oil Town"
- Location in Assam, India Duliajan (India)
- Coordinates: 27.3667°N 95.3167°E
- Country: India
- State: Assam
- District: Dibrugarh
- Established: 10/11/1895
- Elevation: 121 m (397 ft)

Population (2011)
  - Total: 28,626
  - Rank: 16th In Assam

Languages
  - Official: Assamese, English
- Time zone: UTC+5:30 (IST)
- PIN: 786602
- Vehicle registration: AS-06

Duliajan is an industrial city of Dibrugarh district in the Indian state of Assam located in the upper north-east corner of India.It is about 45 km east of Dibrugarh City. It is particularly known for its oil related industry, Oil India Limited, one of the country's largest oil and gas companies. There is also other central government owned companies like B.C.P.L. GDU Station, N.E.E.P.C.O., D.N.P.L., LPG Plant and the Shivani company which is India's largest private company for drilling. Assam Gas Company Limited, which carries out business related to natural gas in India owned by the Government of Assam, is also located in this township.

== History ==
Duliajan derived its name from "Dulia" meaning "palanquin-bearers" of the Ahom kings and "Jan" meaning "a river stream". The Ahom kings, also known as Swargadeos, were very fond of hunting in the Upper Dihing forests. The Swargadeos would come by boats from their capital of Garhgaon and Rangpur (in Sivasagar district) down the Dikhow River to the mighty Brahmaputra, then row upstream, enter the Dihing River and halt at the mouth of the stream near Tipling-Ghat in present-day Duliajan. The stream was a guiding pathway for the palanquin bearers of the Swargadeos. Thus, when a new oil town was constructed in this area, to honour the palanquin bearers, it became a natural choice for the historical name of Duliajan.

As per another legend, Dulia khel (a sub-community of Ahom) first settled on the bank of a small rivulet Duriajan which is in the village of Kachari Pathar. This Duriajan was used by the Dulia community and gradually people started calling the rivulet Duliajan. The entire town that mushroomed around the rivulet was then named after the same water body. After the Ahom king Suhanfa was killed in a conspiracy, according to prevalent custom those days, the ministers of Suhanfa’s cabinet selected his son Supinfa as his successor. Immediately after ascending the throne, Supinfa investigated the killing of his father and found one of his minister Laturban and his sons as the main conspirators. Swargadeo Supimfa then ordered that Laturban and his sons be beheaded for the heinous crime. Accordingly, on the banks of a small river, far away from the Ahom capital, the order was carried out. As the place was far from the capital and near to a river bank, the place came to be known as "Duroijan" where in the Assamese language duroi means "far distant" and jan means "rivulet". It is said from "Duraijan" the word Duliajan came in focus.

There is no official record about the exact date of declaration of the oil town as Duliajan. But it started initially with a nucleus of experienced personnel drawn from the Assam Oil Company (AOC) as well as Burmah Oil Company (BOC), the pioneer organizations of Digboi Oilfield. Oil India formally set up its own organization on 1 January 1962 to look after all aspects of drilling and exploration operations, with its headquarters at Duliajan, then known as Zaloni in the Nahorkatiya area.

The establishment of Duliajan oil town may be said to have brought about an era of petroleum industries in the district of Lakhimpur which then comprised the present districts of Dibrugarh and Tinisukia on the south bank and Lakhimpur and Dhemaji on the north bank of the river Brahmaputra. Since its establishment, this fast-growing town has been playing a vital role in the state’s as well as country’s economy.

== Climate ==
In Duliajan, the climate is warm and temperate. In winter there is much less rainfall than in summer. According to Köppen and Geiger, the climate is classified as Cwa. The average annual temperature in Duliajan is 23.2 °C. The average annual rainfall is 2528 mm. The driest month is December with 21 mm. Most precipitation falls in July, with an average of 489 mm. The warmest month of the year is August with an average temperature of 27.8 °C. In January, the average temperature is 16.1 °C. It is the lowest average temperature of the whole year.

The difference in precipitation between the driest month and the wettest month is 468 mm. The average temperatures vary during the year by 11.7 °C.

== Demographics ==
As of the 2011 India census, Duliajan had a population of 28,626:- 14,898 males and 13,728 females, giving a sex ratio 921 which was lower than the state average of 958. Duliajan had an average literacy rate of 93.98% (male 96.57%, female 91.16%) much higher than the state average of 72.19%. 9.63% of the total population was under 6 years of age.

== Transportation ==
Duliajan is well linked to the cities and towns of the state and also to the rest of the country. The closest airport is the Mohanbari Airport in the outskirts of Dibrugarh, which is at a distance of 41 km and connects the rest of the country to the Oil Town. From the airport, there are taxis available to Duliajan.

The town also has a railway station for transportation within Assam and the rest of the country. As the closest railway junctions are at Dibrugarh and Tinsukia (which is at a distance of only 20 km), most trains do not stop at Duliajan even when they pass through the town. However, the few trains that make stoppages at the station are Kamrup Express, Intercity Express, Dibrugarh-Kamakhya SPL, New Tinsukia-Ranjendra Nagar SPL and Dibrugarh-Rangiya SPL.

Road transport is another important backbone for the town to connect with the rest of the state. Easily accessible by road by a branch-off (40 km) from national highway NH-37, Duliajan is also well connected to the nearest district headquarters of Tinsukia and Dibrugarh. NH-37 traverses the state of Assam connecting all major towns and cities. Buses, both private and ASTC, on a daily basis, ply to Guwahati, Nagaon, Jorhat, Dibrugarh, Tinsukia and even to parts of Arunachal Pradesh. Buses are sometimes, locally referred to as "Supers".

== Sports ==
Sports has always been an important and enthusiastic topic for the locals of the town. The local youths and children indulge in different sports throughout the year. The Duliajan Athletic Club which is the body of Assam Athletics Association affiliated with athletics, football, cricket, lawn tennis, table tennis, golf, taekwondo, badminton, baseball, kabaddi, chess, kho-kho in school level, handball at college level, boxing, kick boxing, swimming, squash and martial arts. The two main clubs of the town, Duliajan Club and Zaloni Club provide the basic sports facilities and trainings for enthusiastic local kids from an early age.

The prominent football club of Duliajan, Oil India FC is affiliated with the AIFF and has competed in the I-League 2nd Division for three seasons. The club is the defending champion of the ATPA Shield. The Nehru Maidan, also known as Oil India Ground, is the home ground of Oil India FC. It has hosted numerous state- and national-level football tournaments, district-level cricket competitions and state-level athletics meets. The stadium has a seating capacity of 10,000 spectators.

== Festivals ==
By being the headquarters of OIL, Duliajan has become home to people from all corners of the country, some of whom have settled down to start businesses and others as employees in OIL. The main festivals celebrated are Bihu, Krishna Janmashtami, Maha Shivaratri, Eid al Fitr, Christmas, Eid al-Adha, Durga Puja, Kali Puja, Saraswati Puja, Dussehra and Vishwakarma Puja. Chhath Puja is celebrated by the Bihari community and Ganesh Chaturthi is mainly celebrated by the Telugu community of the town.

Rath Yatra or Kang is celebrated by the Manipuri community to worship Lord Jagannath.

Me-Dam-Me-Phi is celebrated by the Tai-Ahom community on 31 January every year in memory of the departed. It is the manifestation of the concept of ancestor worship that the Ahoms share with other peoples originating from the Tai-Shan stock. It is a festival to show respect to the departed ancestors and remember their contribution to society.

Sankardev Tithi, Madhavdev Tithi and Janmashtami are observed by the Assamese community in memory of the two Vaishnavite saints from Medieval Assam.

== Schools ==
- Delhi Public School
- Kendriya Vidyalaya

== Notable people ==
- Parineeta Borthakur, a Bollywood and Assamese actress.
- Plabita Borthakur, a Bollywood actress was born in Duliajan. She did her schooling from Delhi Public School, Duliajan. The 'Manu' from the band Manu&Chow, she acted in the film PK.
- Dipannita Sharma, a Bollywood actress was born in Duliajan. She did her schooling from Kendriya Vidyalaya, Duliajan. She is now married and settled in Mumbai.

== Sightseeing ==
- Tilinga Mandir (Bell Temple), lies about 8 km from the outskirts of Duliajan. This is a renowned Shiva temple, characterized by numerous bells tied on the branches of a giant peepal tree.

== Politics ==
Duliajan is part of Dibrugarh (Lok Sabha constituency). Terash Gowalla of BJP is the sitting MLA from the Duliajan seat in Legislative Assembly. Rameswar Teli an Indian politician from Duliajan, and a member of the Bharatiya Janata Party has been elected to the Lok Sabha from the Dibrugarh (Lok Sabha constituency) in the general elections of 2014.
