= Numaligarh Refinery =

Oil refinery in Assam, India

- Type: Public sector enterprise
- Industry: Oil and gas
- Headquarters: Guwahati, Assam
- Key people: Ranjit Rath (chairman)
- Products: Petroleum; Natural gas; Petrochemicals
- Revenue: ▼₹25,000 crore (US$2.6 billion) (2025)
- Operating income: ▼₹2,618.9 crore (US$270 million) (2020)
- Net income: ▼₹1,608 crore (US$170 million) (2025)
- Total assets: ▼₹42,841.39 crore (US$4.4 billion) (2020)
- Total equity: ▼₹15,000 crore (US$1.6 billion) (2025)
- Owner: Oil India (69.63%), Government of Assam (26%), Engineers India Limited (4.37%)
- Number of employees: 1100 (March 2025)
- Website: www.nrl.co.in

Numaligarh Refinery Limited (NRL) is a public sector oil company in Assam, India, under the Ministry of Petroleum and Natural Gas. Founded in 1999, its majority share is held by Oil India Limited, before that, it was held by BPCL. The commercial production commenced from 1 October 2000. It is headquartered in Guwahati, with refinery located in Golaghat. From 2 December 2025 onwards, NRL is a Navratna PSU.

As of 2014, it had a capacity of 3 million metric tonnes per year. In January 2019, the Cabinet Committee on Economic Affairs approved plans to increase the refinery's capacity to 9 million metric tonnes per year.
