= Assam Rifles football team =

Assam Rifles
- Full name: Assam Rifles Football Team
- Nickname: The Riflemen
- Ground: Various
- Owner: Assam Rifles
- Head coach: Ningombam Jiten Singh
- League: Various
Home colours	Away colours

Assam Rifles football team is a football section which represents the Assam Rifles, one of the paramilitary forces of India. The team often participates in the Durand Cup, Bordoloi Trophy, Independence Day Cup and various other regional football tournaments.

== Honours ==
=== League ===
- Assam State Premier League

Champions (3): 2008–09, 2009–10, 2010–11
(silver) Runners-up (1): 2011–12

- Assam Club Championship

Champions (2): 1999, 2000

=== Cup ===
- Bordoloi Trophy
  - Winners (1): 1964
  - (silver) Runners-up (5): 1960, 1961, 1982, 1987, 2012
- Independence Day Cup
  - Winners (4): 1981, 2010, 2013, 2017
  - (silver) Runners-up (2): 2012, 2022
- ATPA Shield
  - Winners (3): 1966, 2007, 2008
- Bodousa Cup
  - Winners (1)
- Oil India Gold Cup
  - Champions (1): 2006
- Amba Medhi Football Tournament
  - Winners (4): 1994, 2000, 2007, 2008
- Churachand Singh Trophy
  - Winners (9): 1950, 1952, 1954, 1957, 1959, 1968, 1969, 1979, 2008
  - (silver) Runners-up (1): 1960
- Sohanlal Dugar Shield
  - Winners (2): 2014, 2015
  - (silver) Runners-up (2): 1999, 2001

== See also ==
- Army Red
- Army Green
- Indian Air Force
- Indian Navy
- Services football team
- Railways football team
- Central Reserve Police Force
- CISF Protectors football team
