= Judges Field =

Multi-purpose sports ground in Guwahati, Assam, India

- Location in Guwahati Location in Assam
- Full name: Judges Field
- Former names: Gauhati Town Club Ground
- Location: Guwahati, Assam
- Coordinates: 26.189317°N 91.749050°E
- Owner: Gauhati Town Club
- Operator: Gauhati Town Club
- Capacity: 5,000
- Surface: Grass

Construction
- Groundbreaking: 1908
- Opened: 1908
- Renovated: 2009

Tenants
- Gauhati Town Club; Guwahati Premier Football League

Judges Field or Gauhati Town Club Ground is a multi-purpose sports ground in Guwahati, Assam. The ground is mainly used for football and cricket matches. It is the home of Gauhati Town Club, one of the oldest and premier sports club in Northeast India.It regularly hosts matches of all divisions of GSA Football League.

== History ==
The top football tournament Bordoloi Trophy was initially played at this ground from 1952 to 1957. From 2022, the tournament has returned to this venue. The ground has hosted four Ranji Trophy matches in 1956 when Assam cricket team played against Orissa cricket team. The ground hosted three more Ranji Trophy matches in 1960–1961.
