= Bordoloi Trophy =

- Organiser(s): Guwahati Sports Association (GSA)
- Founded: 1952; 74 years ago
- Region: India
- Teams: 232 (in 2026)
- Current champions: NF Railway (1st title)
- Most championships: Mohun Bagan (7 titles)
- Broadcaster: SportsCast India (YouTube)
- Website: bordoloitrophy.com
- 2026 Bordoloi Trophy

The Bharat Ratna Lokopriya Gopinath Bordoloi Trophy, commonly known as Bordoloi Trophy, is a premier annual Indian football tournament held in Guwahati and organized by the Guwahati Sports Association (GSA).

== History ==
Founded in 1952 by Gauhati Town Club, the Bordoloi Trophy is one of Assam’s most prestigious and historic football tournaments. It is named after Assam's first chief minister Gopinath Bordoloi. The tournament features top clubs from Northeast and across India, along with teams from Bangladesh, Nepal, Thailand, Iran and Uzbekistan. Bangladesh’s Abahani Limited won the 2010 edition.

The Kolkata-based Mohun Bagan has lifted the Bordoloi Trophy title a record seven times.

On 27 September 2024, Guwahati Sports Association announced the revamped format of Bordoloi Trophy from its 72nd edition which will be played across three months starting with district level matches, followed by cluster level and the final round. In 2023, Oil India FC won their 5th title of the tournament by defeating United Chirang Duar FC in the final clash.

== Venues ==
The tournament is primarily held at Nehru Stadium, Guwahati. However, Judges Field and other nearby venues also hosting matches.

== Results ==
List of Bordoloi Trophy finals
Year	Winners	Score	Runners-up	Ref.
1952	Railway Sports Club, Pandu	–	Union Sporting Club, Nagaon	
1953	Maharana AC, Guwahati	–	Shillong Garrison	
1954	Gauhati Town Club	–	India Club, Silchar	
1955	State Transport Asso, Shillong	–	Thengalbari Club, Jorhat	
1956	Gauhati Town Club and State Transport Asso, Shillong (joint winners)			
1957	Jalpaiguri TC, West Bengal	–	Gauhati Town Club	
1958	Southern Railway Institute	–	Maharana AC, Guwahati	
1959	Sporting Union Club, Guwahati	–	City College Old Boys FC	
1960	Assam Police, Dergaon	–	Assam Rifles	
1961	Mysore District Committee	–	Assam Rifles	
1962	Leaders FC, Jalandhar	–	Howrah Union	
1963	Gauhati Town Club and Leaders FC, Jalandhar (joint winners) – 0–0			
1964	Assam Rifles	–	Jalpaiguri TC, West Bengal	
1965	Aryan	–	Mohammedan Sporting	
1966	Aryan	–	Mohammedan Sporting	
1967	Eastern Railway	–	Ichapur Rifle Factory	
1968	East Bengal	1–0	Eastern Railway	
1969	Mohammedan Sporting	1–0	East Bengal	
1970	Mohammedan Sporting	–	Khidderpore Sporting Union	
1971	Assam Police, Dergaon	–	Mohammedan Sporting	
1972	East Bengal	0–0, 5–1	(Bangladesh) Dhaka XI	
1973	East Bengal	0–0, 1–0	Leaders FC, Jalandhar	
1974	Mohun Bagan	2–2, 5–0	Vasco	
1975	Mohun Bagan	–	Punjab XI	
1976	Mohun Bagan	3–0	Goa XI	
1977	Mohun Bagan	4–0	Mohammedan Sporting	
1978	East Bengal	4–2	(Thailand) Bangkok Port Authority	
1979	(Thailand) Bangkok Port Authority	–	Oil India Limited	
1980	The tournament was not held			
1981	Assam Police	–	Dempo	
1982	Dempo	1–0	Assam Rifles	
1983	Dempo	1–0	Mohammedan Sporting	
1984	Mohun Bagan	–	Mafatlal SC, Bombay	
1985	Mohammedan Sporting	1–0	Salgaocar	
1986	Mohammedan Sporting	3–0	Punjab State Electricity Board	
1987	Khidderpore Sporting Union	–	Assam Rifles	
1988	ASEB	–	Assam Police	
1989	(Iran) Esteghlal	1–0	(Bangladesh) Mohammedan (Dhaka)	
1990	Oil India Limited	–	Shillong XI	
1991	Mohammedan Sporting	1–0	East Bengal	
1992	East Bengal	1–0	(Bangladesh) Abahani Krira Chakra	
1993	(Thailand) Bangkok Port Authority	1–0	Mohun Bagan	
1994	Punjab Police	–	Mizoram XI	
1995	Assam Police	–	Williamson Magor Academy	
1996	Mohun Bagan	2–1	East Bengal	
1997	Assam Police	1–1 (5–4 p)	Mizoram Aizawl XI	
1998	(Uzbekistan) Narbakhar Club	10–1	TRAU	
1999	Assam Regimental Centre	2–1	ASEB	
2000	Tata Football Academy	1–1 (4–3 p)	2nd Assam Special Reserve Force	
2001	Mohun Bagan	4–0	(Thailand) Rajpracha	
2002	Assam Regimental Centre	1–0	ASEB	
2003	Assam Regimental Centre	3–0	Oil India	
2004	(Bangladesh) Brothers Union	1–0 (a.e.t.)	Shillong XI	
2005	Assam Regimental Centre	2–2 (5–3 p)	SAIL	
2006	ASEB	1–0	Assam Regimental Centre	
2007	Port Authority of Thailand	3–0	ONGC, Mumbai	
2008	Oil India	3–0 (a.e.t.)	ASEB	
2009	ASEB	3–2	Nagaland Police	
2010	(Bangladesh) Abahani Limited	3–0	(Nepal) Three Star Club	
2011	Royal Wahingdoh	2–1	Langsning	
2012	Oil India	4–1	Assam Rifles	
2013	Bhawanipore	1–0	Aizawl	
2014	ASEB	2–2 (4–2 p)	Green Valley	
2015	The tournament was not held			
2016	(Nepal) Three Star Club	2–1	East Bengal	
2018	Mohammedan Sporting	3–1	Oil India	
2019	Oil India	2–2 (5–2 p)	ASEB	
2020	The tournament was not held			
2021	ASEB	2–1	Oil India	
2022	Delhi	1–0	Nagaland Police	
2023	Oil India	3–1	United Chirang Duar	
2025	NF Railway	1–1 (6–5 p)	NorthEast United	

== See also ==
- Assam Football Association
- Assam State Premier League
- ATPA Shield
- Bodousa Cup
- Independence Day Cup (Assam)
- Indian Super League
- Indian Football League
- Durand Cup
- Santosh Trophy
