= Assam State Premier League =

- Assam State Premier League
- Organising body: Assam Football Association
- Founded: 2008; 18 years ago
- Country: India
- Number of clubs: 8
- Level on pyramid: 5
- Promotion to: I-League 3
- Relegation to: Assam Club Championship
- Domestic cup(s): Bordoloi Trophy; Independence Day Cup; ATPA Shield
- Current champions: Chhaygaon FC (1st title)
- Most championships: Assam Rifles (3 titles)
- Broadcaster(s): sportvot.com
- Current: Assam State Premier League 2026-27

The Assam State Premier League (ASPL) is the top state-level football league in the Indian state of Assam. It is organised by the Assam Football Association and currently contested by 8 clubs.

== History ==
The inaugural edition of the Assam State Premier League started in 2008, with Assam Rifles winning its first title. The league was discontinued in 2015. Seven years later, in 2023, it was revived by Assam Football Association.

== Competition structure ==
Tier	Division
I _{(5 on Indian football pyramid)}	Assam State Premier League
II _{(6 on Indian football pyramid)}	Assam Club Championship
III	District Football Leagues

The winner of the Assam State Premier League gets promoted to the I-League 3, and the last position gets relegated to the Assam Club Championship. From 2015 season the league has been revamped with two zones - Upper and Lower Assam. The league begins with the group stage on home and away basis. The top four teams from each zone qualified for the quarterfinals. In 2023, Assam Football Association revived the league after a gap of 7 years.

== Clubs ==
Location of ASPL teams
Location of the clubs in Guwahati

The following 11 clubs are competing in the 2025 season of ASPL.

Team	City/Town
Assam Police FC	Guwahati
Assam United FC	Guwahati
Chhaygaon FC	Chhaygaon
Elevenstar Club Bongaigaon	Bongaigaon
FC Green Valley	Guwahati
Haluating United FC	Amguri
Hawk FA	Guwahati
Immortal Warriors FC	Tezpur
Jorhat Town Club	Jorhat
Lenruol FC	Lakhipur
United Chirang Duar FC	Chirang

== Champions ==
Season	Champions	Runners-up	Note
2008–09	Assam Rifles	Oil India	
2009–10	Assam Rifles	Assam Police Blues	
2010–11	Assam Rifles	Oil India	
2011–12	Oil India	Assam Rifles	
2012–13	Radial Club	Green Valley	
2013–14	Assam Police Blues	Green Valley	
2015	Karbi Anglong Morning Star	Green Valley	
2023–24	Karbi Anglong Morning Star	United Chirang Duar	
2024–25	Chhaygaon FC	Elevenstar Club Bongaigaon	

== Sponsorship ==
- 2010–2012: Airtel
- 2023–present: Numaligarh Refinery

== See also ==
- Nehru Maidan
- Indira Gandhi Athletic Stadium
- Nehru Stadium
