= Oil India =

State-owned oil and gas company in India

Oil India Limited
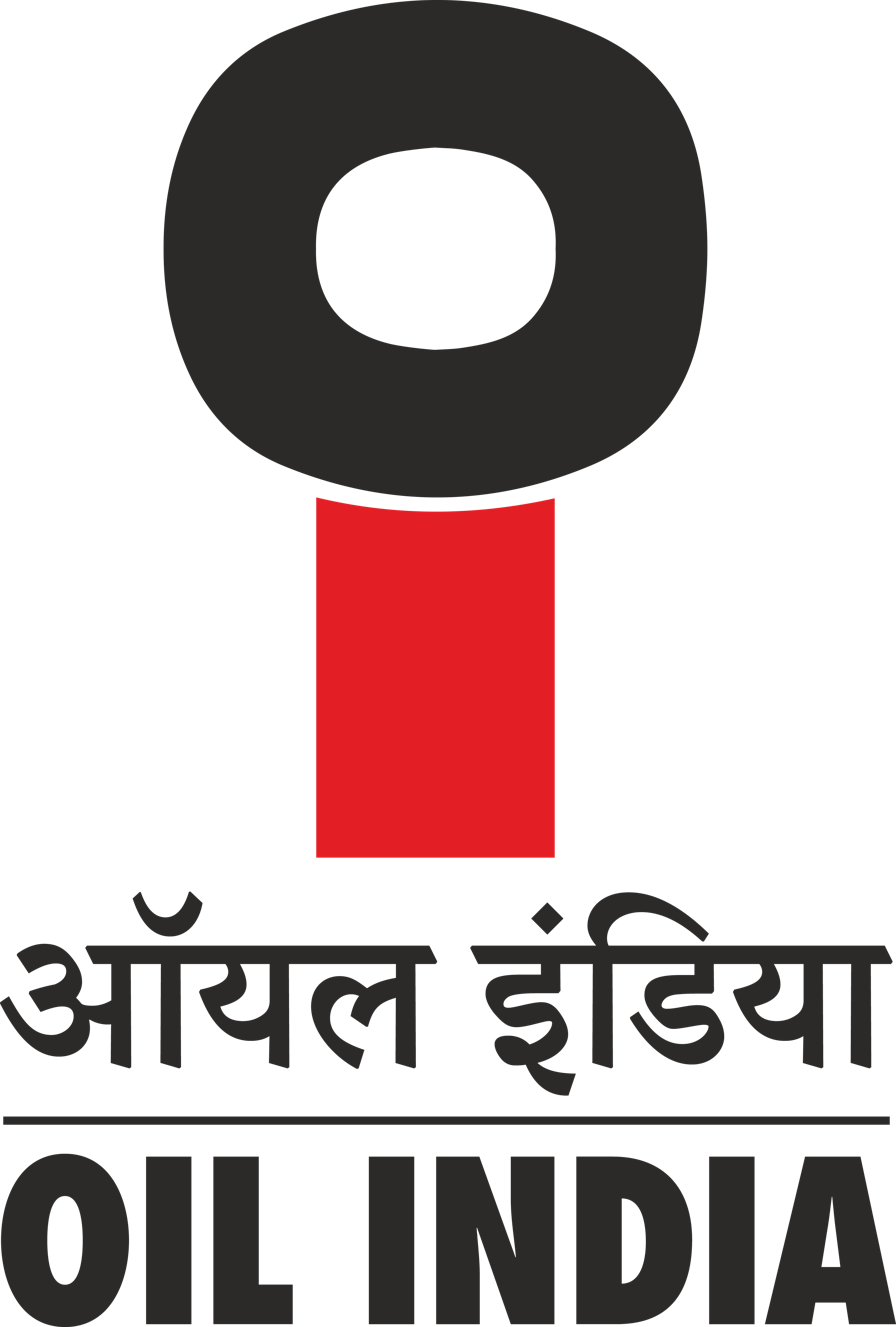
- Type: Public
- Traded as: NSE: OIL; BSE: 533106
- Industry: Oil and Gas
- Founded: 18 February 1959; 67 years ago
- Headquarters: Duliajan, Assam (Registered Office and Field Headquarter); Noida (Corporate Office)
- Key people: Dr. Ranjit Rath (Chairman & MD)
- Products: Petroleum; Natural gas; Petrochemicals
- Revenue: ▲₹38,981 crore (US$4.0 billion) (2026)
- Net income: ▲₹7,551 crore (US$780 million) (2026)
- Total assets: ▲₹123,848 crore (US$13 billion) (2026)
- Total equity: ▲₹53,716 crore (US$5.6 billion) (2026)
- Owner: Government of India (56.66%)
- Divisions: Numaligarh Refinery Limited
- Website: www.oil-india.com

Oil India Limited (OIL) is an Indian public sector company engaged in the exploration, development and production of crude oil and natural gas, transportation of crude oil, and production of liquid petroleum gas. The Ministry of Petroleum and Natural Gas oversees its operations. Headquartered in Duliajan, Assam, the company has its offices in Duliajan, Noida, Kolkata, Guwahati and Jodhpur.

The company's history spans the discovery of crude oil in India in the year 1889, this was second in the World in the far east of India at Digboi and Naharkatiya, Assam to its present status as a fully integrated upstream petroleum company, operating in more than 9 locations overseas. OIL acquired majority shares in Numaligarh Refinery Limited from Bharat Petroleum Corporation Limited, thus making Numaligarh Refinery Limited a subsidiary of OIL.

In 2023, Oil India Limited was elevated to the Maharatna status on the recommendation of the Ministry of Finance, making it the 13th Maharatna Central Public Sector Enterprises (CPSE).

== Exploration and production ==
Oil India Limited (OIL) was initially formed as a joint venture between the Burmah Oil Company Limited (BOC) and Government of India. The first oilfield in India was discovered in Digboi, Assam, as early as 1887, by a predecessor of Assam Oil, a subsidiary of BOC. (Corley, T A B, 1983, The History of the Burmah Oil Company, 1886–1983). Early in 1950s, Assam Oil discovered the first new oilfield in post-independence India, under the leadership of the geologist W. B. Metre, at Naharkatiya. Oil India was formed in 1959 to operate this new field and other nearby concessions, with Burmah Oil holding 2/3rd equity holding and Government of India holding 1/3rd equity. Later in 1961, this was changed to 50/50 shareholding. In 1982, Burmah Oil transferred all its shares to Government of India and Oil India became 100% Government owned. It was converted to a public limited company on 30 August 1995.

As of 2014 the company produced 3.466 MMT of crude oil, 2625.81 million cubic metre at standard conditions of natural gas and 46,640 tonnes of LPG. Most of this was produced from its traditionally rich oil and gas fields concentrated in the Northeastern part of India and contribute around 80% of total oil and gas produced in the region.

== History ==
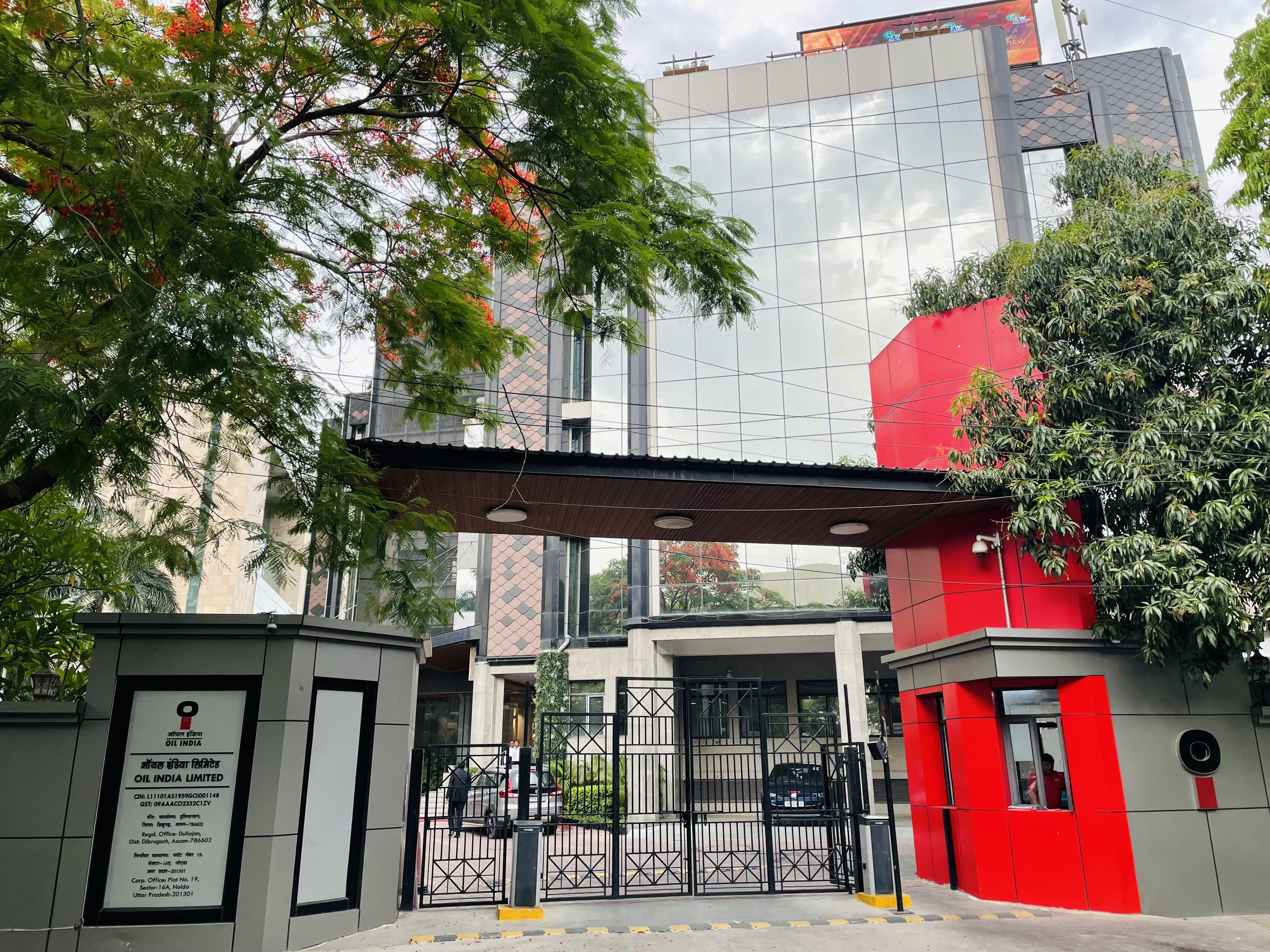
Corporate office of Oil India Limited, Noida

Oil India was founded on 18 February 1959, with its registered office in Duliajan, Assam, as a privately held oil exploration company. Burmah Oil Company originally held two-thirds of the stock and the Government of India (via the Office of the President) held the rest. This joint venture gave birth to the exploration and drilling at two new sites in Naharkatiya and Moran in Dibrugarh district which had then been just recently discovered. In 1961, the Government of India acquired 50% ownership interest. In 1981, the Government of India acquired 100% of the equity interest in the company which by then controlled all the oilfields of Tinsukia and Dibrugarh districts.

In 1961, construction of the company's first gas-powered power plant was completed in Duliajan, Assam. IN 1962, a 401 km (16-inch diameter) pipeline from Duliajan to Guwahati was completed. The following year, a 756 km (14-inch diameter) extension to the pipeline from Guwahati to Barauni in Bihar was completed.

A 1,157-kilometre (719 mi) long fully automated telemetric pipeline with 212 kilometres (132 mi) of looping and a total capacity to transport over 6.0 million tonnes per year remains the lifeline of the company. Commissioned in 1962, the double skinned crude oil pipeline traverses 78 rivers including the Brahmaputra River as it meanders through paddy fields, forests and swamps. There are 11 pumping stations, 18 repeater stations and two terminals at Numaligarh and Rongapani in Udalguri district. The engines that drive the giant pumps along the pipeline have more than two hundred thousand hours of service and established a world record of machine hours.

OIL completed the construction of a 660-kilometre (410 mi) pipeline from Numaligarh to Siliguri in November 2007. The company also sells its gas to different customers in Assam: Brahmaputra Valley Fertilizer Corporation Limited (BVFCL), ASEB, NEEPCO, Indian Oil Corporation's retail Assam Oil Division, and APL as well as to the Rajasthan Rajya Vidyut Utpadan Nigam formerly part of the Rajasthan State Electricity Board. It also produces liquefied petroleum gas (LPG) at its plant in Duliajan, Assam.

== Management ==
Chairman and Managing Directors
- 1984 to 1987 - Maj Gen SCN Jatar.
- 1992 to 1995 - Mr. Bikash Chandra Bora
- May 2002 to 28 February 2006 - Mr. Ranjit Kumar Dutta
- 14 March 2006 to 1 December 2008 - Mr. Mulkh Raj Pasrija
- 1 December 2008 to April 2012 - Mr. Nayan Mani Borah
- May 2012 to 30 June 2015 - Mr. S. K. Srivastava
- 1 July 2015 to 17 July 2016 - vacant
- 18 July 2016 to 30 September 2019 - Mr. Utpal Bora
- 1 October 2019 to 30 June 2022- Mr. Sushil Chandra Mishra
- 2 August 2022 to present - Dr. Ranjit Rath

== International operations ==
OIL's overseas E & P portfolio consists of 17 Blocks spread over 10 countries: Libya, Gabon, Nigeria, Yemen, Venezuela, USA, Mozambique, Myanmar, Bangladesh and Russia. In addition to the above, OIL has 10% PI in 741 km long Multiproduct pipeline construction and operation project in Sudan which was completed in 2005.

Oil India Limited carries out operations through a total of five subsidiaries, namely OIIL (Oil Indian International Limited), Oil India International BV, Oil India Sweden AB, Oil India (USA) Inc and OIL Cyprus.

== See also ==
- Indian Oil Corporation
- Rajiv Gandhi Institute of Petroleum Technology
