= Bodousa Cup =

- Organiser(s): Bodousa Sports Club, Tinsukia
- Founded: 2009; 17 years ago
- Region: India
- Teams: 13 (in 2025)
- Current champions: Diamond Harbour (1st title)
- Most championships: Oil India (4 titles)

The Bodousa Cup is an invitational football tournament in India, held across multiple venues of Assam and organised by Bodousa Sports Club of Tinsukia annually under the supervision of Assam Football Association. The tournament was incorporated in 2009 and is named after Moran Bodousa, a historical figure in upper Assam.

The 13th edition of the Bodousa Cup football tournament was held from December 4, 2021.

== Results ==
List of Bodousa Cup Finals
Year	Winners	Score	Runners-up	Ref.
2010	Oil India	2–1	NEROCA	
	Assam Rifles	4–1	Oil India	
2015	Oil India	2–1	NEROCA	
2016	Shillong Lajong	2–0	ASEB	
2018	(Bangladesh) Saif Sporting Club	2–0	Jamshedpur	
2019	Gokulam Kerala	2–2 (6–5 p)	Minerva Punjab	
2020	Oil India	2–1	ASEB	
2021	Luca Soccer Club	1–0	Kerala United	
2022	Lamare SC, Shillong	0–0 (4–2 p)	Gorkha Training Centre	
2023	Oil India	1–0	Juvenile FC, Manipur	
2024	ASEB	0–0 (5–4 p)	Juvenile FC, Manipur	
2025	Diamond Harbour	5–0	Barekuri FC, Tinsukia	
