= Assam Football Association =

State governing body of Football in Assam

- Sport: Football
- Jurisdiction: Assam
- Membership: 27 district associations
- Abbreviation: AFA
- Founded: 1946
- Affiliation: All India Football Federation (AIFF)
- Headquarters: Guwahati
- President: Naba Kumar Doley
- Secretary: Dr. Sangrang Brahma

The Assam Football Association (AFA) is one of the 37 Indian state football associations that are affiliated to the All India Football Federation. It governs football in the state of Assam, India and also administers the Assam men's and women's football teams. It sends state teams for Santosh Trophy and Rajmata Jijabai Trophy.

== History ==
The Assam Football Association was formed in 1946, with Fakhruddin Ali Ahmed as its president and B. Roy Chowdhury as its secretary. However, football had been played in the region even before the independence of India. It is affiliated to the AIFF, Assam council of sports and Assam Olympic Association. Manipur was part of Assam Football Association, until they gained affiliation with the AIFF in 1973. The Assam FA conducts inter-district football tournaments of various age groups for men and women as well as divisional football leagues in the state. AFA introduced the top division Assam State Premier League from 2008. Naba Kumar Doley is the current president and Dr. Sangrang Brahma the honorary secretary of Assam FA.

== State teams ==
=== Men ===
- Assam football team
- Assam under-20 football team
- Assam under-15 football team
- Assam under-13 football team

=== Women ===
- Assam women's football team
- Assam women's under-19 football team
- Assam women's under-17 football team

== Main competitions ==
=== District level ===
==== Men's ====
- Khirod Baruah Senior Inter-District Football Championship

==== Men's youth ====
- Sujit Narzary Memorial Inter-District Football Tournament _{(Boys U-13)}
- Satindra Mohan Dev Sub-Junior Inter-District Football Championship _{(Boys U-15)}
- Santosh Lahkar Junior Inter-District Football Championship _{(Boys U-17)}

==== Women's ====
- Gobinda Ram Mour and Banarshi Devi Senior Women's Inter-District Football Championship

=== Club level ===
==== Men's ====
- Assam State Premier League
- Assam Club Championship

==== Women's ====
- Assam Women's League

==== Youth ====
- Assam Youth League _{(U-13, U-15 & U-17)}

==== Futsal ====
- Assam Futsal Championship

== Assam Football League pyramid ==
Tier	Division
I _{(5 on Indian football pyramid)}	Assam State Premier League _{↑promote (I-League 3) ↓relegate}
II _{(6 on Indian football pyramid)}	Assam Club Championship_{↑promote}
III	Guwahati Premier Football League/ District Football Leagues_{↑promote}

Tier	GSA Football Leagues
I _{(5 on Indian football pyramid)}	Guwahati Premier Football League; 16 clubs ↓relegate
II	GSA A Division Football League; 8 clubs ↑ promote 2 ↓ relegate 2
III	GSA B Division Football League; 10 clubs ↑ promote 2 ↓ relegate 2
IV	GSA C Division Football League; 10 clubs ↑ promote 2 no relegation
Youth	GSA Youth & Kids League_{(U7 to U19)}

== Evolution ==
Years		1946	1947–1952	1952–1955	1955–2008	2008–2015	2015–2023	2023–present
Level		1946	1947–1952	1952–1955	1955–2008	2008–2015	2015–2023	2023–present
Men's
State leagues	1	Formation of Indian Football Association (IFA)	None			Assam State Premier League	Not held	Assam State Premier League
Cup competitions			Independence Day Cup					
Cup competitions			None	Bordoloi Trophy				
Cup competitions			None		ATPA Shield			
Women's
State leagues	1		None					Assam Women's League

== See also ==
- Independence Day Cup (Assam)
- Bordoloi Trophy
- ATPA Shield
- Bodousa Cup
- Bodoland Martyrs Gold Cup
- List of Indian state football associations
- Football in India
- North East Premier League (India)
