= 2015–16 I-League U18 =

I-League U18
- Season: 2015–16
- Champions: AIFF Elite Academy
- Matches: 108
- Goals: 358 (3.31 per match)
- Top goalscorer: (India) L. Lalawmpuia (14 goals)
- Biggest home win: DSK Shivajians U18 12–0 Mumbai U18 (21 Oct 2015)
- Biggest away win: Mumbai U18 0–10 Pune U18 (15 Nov 2015)
- Highest scoring: DSK Shivajians U18 12–0 Mumbai U18 (21 Oct 2015)
- Longest unbeaten run: 14 games AIFF Elite Academy
- All statistics correct as of 28 January 2016.

The 2015–16 I-League U18 is the eighth season of the Indian I-League U18 competition. The U-18 I-League is the premier age-group football tournament of the country which has been re-structured keeping AFC U-19 Championship in mind. The season began on 8 October 2015. and on 10 February 2016, AIFF Elite Academy won the title by defeating Tata Football Academy 2–0 in the final. AIFF Elite Academy also remained unbeaten in the tournament.

== Format ==
The teams were divided in five groups based on their geographical location and they played on home-and-away basis against each other within the groups. Two teams from each zone advanced to the next round-robin stage where the ten teams were divided into two groups of five teams each. Final round was played at Howrah Municipal Corporation Stadium and East Bengal Ground, and top two teams from each group would book their berths in the semi-finals, which was followed by the third position decider and the final.

== Teams ==
The participants for the 2015-16 season in the I-League U18 are:

Group A - Maharashtra Zone	Group B - Kolkata - Jamshedpur	Group C - Shillong - Guwahati	Group D - Goa Zone	Group E - Rest of India Zone
DSK Shivajians U18; Kenkre U18; Mumbai U18; PIFA U18; Pune U18	East Bengal U18; Tata FA U18; SAI-Kolkata U18; United SC U18; Mohun Bagan U18; Mohammedan U18	Royal Wahingdoh U18; Guwahati U18; Rangdajied United U18; Shillong Lajong U18; SAI-Guwahati U18	Salgaocar 18; Dempo U18; Sporting Goa U18; AIFF Elite Academy U18; SAI-Goa U18	

Group 1	Group 2
Bengaluru FC U18; Minerva U18; Fateh Hyderabad U18; Lonestar Kashmir U18	Aizawl U18; NEROCA U18; Gangtok Himalayan U18

== Group A - Maharashtra Zone ==
All times are Indian Standard Time (IST) – UTC+05:30.

Team	Pld	W	D	L	GF	GA	GD	Pts	Qualification
Pune U18	8	6	2	0	37	3	+34	20	Advance to final round
DSK Shivajians U18	8	6	2	0	34	2	+32	20	Advance to final round
Mumbai U18	8	2	2	4	4	25	−21	8	
Kenkre U18	8	2	1	5	6	22	−16	7	
PIFA U18	8	0	1	7	0	29	−29	1	

Source: Results & Fixtures: U-18 I-League
Rules for classification: 1) points; 2) head-to-head results; 3) head-to-head goal difference; 4) head-to-head goals scored; 5) goal difference 6) goals scored; 7) drawing of lots.

=== Fixtures and results ===
18 October 2015	PIFA U18	0–8	Pune U18	Bhiwandi
15:30			13', 29', 30', 35' L. Lalawmpuia; 21' Amos Lalnienga; 63' Pawan Pratap; 86' Daniel Hmar; 90' Sannik Murmu	Stadium: All Saints School

21 October 2015	DSK Shivajians U18	12–0	Mumbai U18	DSK Football Field
17:30	Safvan Muffed 0+1'; L Lalnunsiama 21'; Rohit Kumar 27'; M Mawihmingthanga 31'; Jesse Ralte 33'; L Lallianzuala 34', 66', 78'; M Mawihmingthanga 39'; Gagandeep Singh 72', 77', 79'

24 October 2015	Pune U18	7–0	Kenkre U18	Mamurdi
15:30	L. Lalawmpuia 2', 36', 79', 88'; Amos Lalnienga 21', 23'; Omega Vanlalhruaitluanga 25'			Stadium: Pune FC Training Pitches

25 October 2015	DSK Shivajians U18	4–0	PIFA U18	DSK Football Field
17:30	L Lallianzuala 62'; Gagandeep Singh 66'; M Mawihmingthanga 70'; Rohit Kumar 85'

1 November 2015	Kenkre U18	0–2	Mumbai U18	Cooperage Ground
18:00			38' Kartik Yenurkar; 51' Rakesh Karmaran

2 November 2015	Pune U18	2–2	DSK Shivajians U18	Mamurdi
15:30	Sanchayan Samadder 25'; Amos Lalnienga 63'	Report	26', 45+1' L Lallianzuala	Stadium: Pune FC Training Pitches

7 November 2015	DSK Shivajians U18	6–0	Kenkre U18	DSK Football Field
17:30	Gagandeep Singh 8'; L Lalnunsiama 29'; SK Azaruddin 36'; L Lallianzuala 43'; Marchstarfield Marbawiang 59'; Sairuat Kima 67'

8 November 2015	PIFA U18	0–0	Mumbai U18	Bhiwandi
15:30				Stadium: All Saints School

14 November 2015	Kenkre U18	3–0	PIFA U18	Cooperage Ground
18:00	Arfat Ansari 7', 39'; Marc D'souza 18'

15 November 2015	Mumbai U18	0–10	Pune U18	Cooperage Ground
18:00			14', 33', 55', 79' Md. Ashique Kuruniyan; 34', 66', 87' L. Lalawmpuia; 49', 69' Chesterpaul Lyngdoh; 52' Sahil Panwar

21 November 2015	Pune U18	4–0	PIFA U18	Mamurdi
15:30	Mohammed Yasir 53'; Md. Ashique Kuruniyan 61'; Sanchayan Sam 65'; Amos Lalnienga 84'			Stadium: Pune FC Training Pitches

22 November 2015	Mumbai U18	0–1	DSK Shivajians U18	Cooperage Ground
18:00			14' Gagandeep Singh

28 November 2015	PIFA U18	0–6	DSK Shivajians U18	Bhiwandi
15:30			11', 50' L Lallianzuala; 45+2' Marchstarfield Marbawiang; 56' Suhail Sayed; 67' Hitova Ayemi; 86' Jonathan Cardozo	Stadium: All Saints School

28 November 2015	Kenkre U18	0–4	Pune U18	Cooperage Ground
18:00			34' Chesterpaul Lyngdoh; 44', 51' L. LALAWMPUIA; 77' Amos Lalnienga

5 December 2015	Mumbai U18	0–0	Kenkre U18	Cooperage Ground
18:00

6 December 2015	DSK Shivajians U18	0–0	Pune U18	DSK Football Field
17:30

12 December 2015	Kenkre U18	0–3	DSK Shivajians U18	Cooperage Ground
18:00			18' (o.g.) Shubham Mane; 49', 61' Mawihmingthanga

14 December 2015	Mumbai U18	1–0	PIFA U18	Cooperage Ground
18:00	Calvin Baretto 69'

20 December 2015	PIFA U18	0–3	Kenkre U18	Bhiwandi
15:30			39' Brent Seb Fernandes; 73' Shimyu Sasikumar Manik; 90+3' Siddharth Colaco	Stadium: All Saints School

21 December 2015	Pune U18	2–1	Mumbai U18	Mamurdi
15:30	Melroy Assisi 20' (o.g.); L. Lalawmpuia 90+2'		13' Asifullah Khan	Stadium: Pune FC Training Pitch

== Group B - Kolkata - Jamshedpur ==
All times are Indian Standard Time (IST) – UTC+05:30.

Team	Pld	W	D	L	GF	GA	GD	Pts	Qualification
Tata FA U18	10	8	2	0	15	4	+11	26	Advance to final round
East Bengal U18	10	5	4	1	16	8	+8	19	Advance to final round
SAI-Kolkata U18	10	4	3	3	8	7	+1	15	
United SC U18	10	2	4	4	13	7	+6	10	
Mohun Bagan U18	10	2	4	4	13	11	+2	10	
Mohammedan U18	10	0	1	9	2	30	−28	1	

Source: Results & Fixtures: U-18 I-League
Rules for classification: 1) points; 2) head-to-head results; 3) head-to-head goal difference; 4) head-to-head goals scored; 5) goal difference 6) goals scored; 7) drawing of lots.

=== Fixtures and results ===
24 October 2015	United SC U18	0–0	SAI-Kolkata U18	Kalyani, West Bengal
14:00				Stadium: Kalyani Stadium

25 October 2015	Mohammedan U18	0–2	East Bengal U18	Kolkata
14:00			34' Budhwa Bara; 53' Achinta Ghosh	Stadium: Mohammedan Sporting Ground

27 October 2015	Mohun Bagan U18	0–1	Tata FA U18	Mohun Bagan Ground
14:00			74' Seineo Kuki

31 October 2015	East Bengal U18	0–0	United SC U18	East Bengal Club Ground
14:00

1 November 2015	Tata FA U18	1–0	SAI-Kolkata U18	JRD Sports Complex
14:00	Shaikhom Ronald Singh 66'

2 November 2015	Mohun Bagan U18	6–1	Mohammedan U18	Mohun Bagan Ground
14:00	Azaharuddin 13', 23', 70', 80'; Jerry Dresnas Pulamte 57', 59'		(yellow card) 16' Ramij Molla; 44' Jagai Konra

7 November 2015	United SC U18	1–3	Tata FA U18	Kalyani Stadium
14:00	Sandip Bhattacharjee 46'		71' Thiyam Srivash Singh; 81' Ashish Pradhan; 90+2' Saikhom Ronald Singh

8 November 2015	East Bengal U18	1–1	Mohun Bagan U18	East Bengal Club Ground
14:00	Prakash Sarkar 58'; Budhwa Bara (yellow card) 60'		10' C Lolemruata

9 November 2015	SAI-Kolkata U18	2–1	Mohammedan U18	SAI Ground
14:00	Debaditya Roy Sarkar 6'; Akash Bose (yellow card) 30'; Supratip Barui 90+2'		72' Sayan Sarkar; (yellow card) 82' (yellow-red card) 85' Sagar Roy

14 November 2015	Mohun Bagan U18	1–0	United SC U18	Mohun Bagan Ground
14:00	C Lolemruata 78'

15 November 2015	Mohammedan U18	0–2	Tata FA U18	Mohammedan Sporting Ground
14:00			49' Shaikhom Ronald Singh; 66' Prakash Nayak

16 November 2015	SAI-Kolkata U18	1–3	East Bengal U18	SAI Ground
14:00	Sk. Asiruddin 30'		4' Somnath Nayek; 87' Achinta Ghosh 90+1' Karan Tha

21 November 2015	United SC U18	8–0	Mohammedan U18	Kalyani Stadium
14:00	Ansar Ali Mondal 3', 26', 65', 77'; Jayanta Sarkar 54'; Sandip Bhattacharjee 64'; Shubhankar Dey 88'; Bikash Biswas 90+1'

22 November 2015	Mohun Bagan U18	0–1	SAI-Kolkata U18	Mohun Bagan Ground
14:00			5' Sk. Asiruddin

23 November 2015	Tata FA U18	0–0	East Bengal U18	JRD Sports Complex
14:00

29 November 2015	East Bengal U18	4–0	Mohammedan U18	East Bengal Club Ground
14:00	Somnath Nayek 9', 45+2'; Prakash Sarkar 58'; Akash Mondal 74'

1 December 2015	SAI-Kolkata U18	1–0	United SC U18	SAI Ground
14:00	Deep Chander Ekka 75'

2 December 2015	Tata FA U18	3–2	Mohun Bagan U18	JRD Sports Complex
14:00	Rakesh Yadav 27'; Yendremban Naresh Singh 90'; Seineo Kuki 90+1'		13' B. Rohming Thanga; 40' Jerry Dresnas Pulamte

5 December 2015	United SC U18	1–1	East Bengal U18	Kalyani Stadium
14:00	Ansar Ali Mondal 88'		15' Bijoy Roy

7 December 2015	SAI-Kolkata U18	0–0	Tata FA U18	SAI Ground
14:00

7 December 2015	Mohammedan U18	0–0	Mohun Bagan U18	Mohammedan Sporting Ground
14:00

13 December 2015	Mohun Bagan U18	2–3	East Bengal U18	Mohun Bagan Ground
14:00	Jerry Dresnas Pulamte 10' Azharuddin; 56'		27', 80' Budhwa Bara; 40' Achinta Ghosh

14 December 2015	Mohammedan U18	0–2	SAI-Kolkata U18	Mohammedan Sporting Ground
14:00			14' Sk. Asiruddin; 31' Subrata Malik

15 December 2015	Tata FA U18	1–0	United SC U18	JRD Sports Complex
14:00	Shaikhom Ronald Singh 75'

20 December 2015	United SC U18	0–0	Mohun Bagan U18	Kalyani Stadium
14:00

21 December 2015	East Bengal U18	1–0	SAI-Kolkata U18	East Bengal Club Ground
14:00	Karan Thapa 73'

22 December 2015	Tata FA U18	1–0	Mohammedan U18	JRD Sports Complex
14:00	Shaikhom Ronald Singh 90+3'

26 December 2015	SAI-Kolkata U18	1–1	Mohun Bagan U18	SAI Ground
14:00	Supratip Barui 12'		31' C Lolremruata

28 December 2015	Mohammedan U18	0–3	United SC U18	Mohammedan Sporting Ground
14:00			56' Jayanta Sarkar; 77' Shiba Chowdhury; 86' Monotosh Chakladar

28 December 2015	East Bengal U18	1–3	Tata FA U18	East Bengal Club Ground
14:00	Achinta Ghosh 36'		2', 19', 64' Mobashir Rahman

== Group C - Shillong - Guwahati ==
All times are Indian Standard Time (IST) – UTC+05:30.

Team	Pld	W	D	L	GF	GA	GD	Pts	Qualification
Royal Wahingdoh U18	8	6	2	0	18	0	+18	20	Advance to final round
SAI-Guwahati U18	8	5	1	2	14	6	+8	16	Advance to final round
Shillong Lajong U18	8	4	3	1	26	4	+22	15	
Guwahati U18	8	1	0	7	3	23	−20	3	
Rangdajied United U18	8	1	0	7	2	30	−28	3	

Source: Results & Fixtures: U-18 I-League
Rules for classification: 1) points; 2) head-to-head results; 3) head-to-head goal difference; 4) head-to-head goals scored; 5) goal difference 6) goals scored; 7) drawing of lots.

=== Fixtures and results ===
30 October 2015	Royal Wahingdoh U18	3–0	SAI-Guwahati U18	Shillong
10:00	Seiminmang Manchong 5'; Ajay Chettri 47'; Heibormi Talang 55'			Stadium: Jawaharlal Nehru Stadium

31 October 2015	Shillong Lajong U18	2–1	Guwahati U18	Shillong
10:00	Mebankhraw K Wahlang 53'; R Lalthanmawia 87'		16' Abhijit Tumung; (yellow card) 53' Deepchan Sahu; (yellow card) 78' Chesong Hanse	Stadium: Jawaharlal Nehru Stadium

4 November 2015	Rangdajied United U18	0–2	SAI-Guwahati U18	Shillong
10:00			17' Sinam Chittaranjan Singh; 45' Dhiworaj Boro; (yellow card) 83' Ningthoujam Bipin Singh	Stadium: Jawaharlal Nehru Stadium

5 November 2015	Royal Wahingdoh U18	0–0	Shillong Lajong U18	Shillong
10:00			(yellow card) 63' Novin Gurung	Stadium: Jawaharlal Nehru Stadium

9 November 2015	Guwahati U18	1–0	Rangdajied United U18	Guwahati
12:00	Nuipendra Das 10'; Sanjiv Konwar (yellow card) 27'		(yellow card) 74' Damiki Tariang; (yellow card) 88' Kendy Samlangki Dkhar	Stadium: Jawaharlal Nehru Stadium

10 November 2015	SAI-Guwahati U18	1–0	Shillong Lajong U18	Paltan Bazaar, Guwahati
12:00	K Omesh Singh (yellow card) 15'; Sh Paukhanmung 24' (yellow card) 28'		(yellow card) 23' Mebankhraw K Wahlang	Stadium: SAI Centre

13 November 2015	Shillong Lajong U18	8–0	Rangdajied United U18	Shillong
10:00	Mebankhraw 3'; Joe Zoherliana 22'; Hardy Cliff Nongbri 23', 26'; Sheenstevenson Sohktung 44', 45+1', 56'; Samuel J Lyngdoh Kynshi 73'			Stadium: Jawaharlal Nehru Stadium

14 November 2015	Royal Wahingdoh U18	4–0	Guwahati U18	Shillong
10:00	Suraj Rawat 44'; Shaibor Nongrum 72', 84'; Ajay Chettri 90+1'			Stadium: Jawaharlal Nehru Stadium

19 November 2015	Royal Wahingdoh U18	1–0	Rangdajied United U18	Shillong
10:00	Heibormi Talang 47'			Stadium: Jawaharlal Nehru Stadium

20 November 2015	Guwahati U18	0–1	SAI-Guwahati U18	Guwahati
10:00			25' Lamjingba Mutum	Stadium: Jawaharlal Nehru Stadium

25 November 2015	SAI-Guwahati U18	0–1	Royal Wahingdoh U18	Paltan Bazaar, Guwahati
14:00			45+2' Jerrimon Shylla	Stadium: SAI Centre

26 November 2015	Guwahati U18	0–9	Shillong Lajong U18	Guwahati
10:00			9' Samuel Lalmuanpuia; 10' Ningombam Sana Singh; 30' Dameki Khongstia; 36', 62' Sheenstevenson Sohktung; 64', 66' Samuel Lalmuanpuia; 75' Batskem Nongsiej; 90+1' Hardy Cliff Nongbri	Stadium: Jawaharlal Nehru Stadium

1 December 2015	SAI-Guwahati U18	7–0	Rangdajied United U18	Paltan Bazaar, Guwahati
14:00	Pranjal Bhumji 3', 42', 67', 90+2'; Dwijoraj Boro 14', 72'; Pulok Baruah 73'			Stadium: SAI Centre

2 December 2015	Shillong Lajong U18	0–0	Royal Wahingdoh U18	Shillong
10:00				Stadium: Jawaharlal Nehru Stadium

7 December 2015	Rangdajied United U18	2–1	Guwahati U18	Shillong
10:00	Fourstar Poshna 7', 90+1'		31' Sanjiv Konwar	Stadium: Jawaharlal Nehru Stadium

8 December 2015	Shillong Lajong U18	2–2	SAI-Guwahati U18	Shillong
10:00	Mebankhraw Wahlang 7'; Samuel Lalnunpuia 35'		36' Pranjal Bhumji; 37' Sh Paukhanmung	Stadium: Jawaharlal Nehru Stadium

13 December 2015	Guwahati U18	0–4	Royal Wahingdoh U18	Guwahati
12:00			2', 61' Shaibor Nongrum; 37' Russel Clement Lyngdoh; 85' Heibormi Talang	Stadium: Jawaharlal Nehru Stadium

14 December 2015	Rangdajied United U18	0–5	Shillong Lajong U18	Shillong
10:10			18' Dameki Khongstia; 40', 50' Sheenstevenson Sohktung; 41', 81' Joe Zoherliana	Stadium: Jawaharlal Nehru Stadium

19 December 2015	Rangdajied United U18	0–5	Royal Wahingdoh U18	Shillong
10:00			21' Suraj Rawat; 27' Remos Kerlang Suting; 38' Ronald Kydon Lyngdoh; 80', 90+4' Ajay Chettri	Stadium: Jawaharlal Nehru Stadium

20 December 2015	SAI-Guwahati U18	1–0	Guwahati U18	Paltan Bazaar, Guwahati
12:00	Sinam Chittaranjan Singh 90+4'			Stadium: SAI Centre

== Group D - Goa Zone ==
All times are Indian Standard Time (IST) – UTC+05:30.

Team	Pld	W	D	L	GF	GA	GD	Pts	Qualification
AIFF Elite Academy U18	8	7	1	0	34	5	+29	22	Advance to final round
Salgaocar 18	8	5	1	2	19	13	+6	16	Advance to final round
Sporting Goa U18	8	4	1	3	18	15	+3	13	
Dempo U18	8	0	3	5	4	22	−18	3	
SAI-Goa U18	8	0	2	6	3	23	−20	2	

Source: Results & Fixtures: U-18 I-League
Rules for classification: 1) points; 2) head-to-head results; 3) head-to-head goal difference; 4) head-to-head goals scored; 5) goal difference 6) goals scored; 7) drawing of lots.

=== Fixtures and results ===
24 October 2015	Salgaocar 18	3–0	SAI-Goa U18	Cuncolim Ground
16:00	Stephen Satardekar 28'; Ruflon Fernandes 37'; Mahesh Kumar 51'		(yellow card) 13' Mahommed Shahid M

27 October 2015	Sporting Goa U18	2–2	Dempo U18	Don Bosco Ground
16:00	Daryl Costa 6'; Moises D'sa 19'; (yellow card) 59' Jesmon Soares; (yellow card) 74' Delvert Dave Fernandes; (yellow card) 79' Clive Miranda		10' Aaren D'silva; (yellow card) 38' Nestor Dias; 52' Viraj Naik; (red card) 59' Jayson Lucas

31 October 2015	AIFF Elite Academy U18	2–0	SAI-Goa U18	Nagoa Ground
16:00	Surya Tirkey 3+4'; Amit Tudu 61'; Baoringdao Bodo (yellow card) 69'		(yellow card) 27' Muhammed Hajisha

31 October 2015	Salgaocar 18	2–0	Sporting Goa U18	Cuncolim Ground
16:00	Flester A Gomes 26'; Ruflon Fernandes 33'		(yellow card) 29' Dhiraj Dhaniram Chauhan; (yellow card) 82' Shawn Noronha; (yellow card) 87' Snedden Xavier Rodrigues

5 November 2015	Dempo U18	0–2	AIFF Elite Academy U18	Navelim Ground
16:00			(yellow card) 12' Kyntiew Kharlukhi; (yellow card) 14' Abhishek Halder; 16' Jerry Lalrinzuala; 50' Baoringdao Bodo; 70' Nijwm Muchahary

6 November 2015	SAI-Goa U18	1–5	Sporting Goa U18	Nagoa Ground
16:00	Nidhin Krishna (yellow card) 59'; Ganesa Moorti 82'		(yellow card) 13' Shawn Noronha; 6', 28', 29' Akeraj Martins; 45+3' Delvert Fernandes; 55' Daryl Costa

10 November 2015	Salgaocar 18	4–1	Dempo U18	Cuncolim Ground
16:00	Ronaldo Oliveira 56', 62', 87', 88'		86' Jayson Lucas

12 November 2015	Sporting Goa U18	2–3	AIFF Elite Academy U18	Don Bosco Ground
16:00	Moises D'silva 25'; Akeraj Martins 51'		40+5' Rahul Yadav; 60' Jerry Lalrinzuala; 66' Nijwm Muchahary

19 November 2015	Salgaocar 18	1–1	AIFF Elite Academy U18	Cuncolim Ground
16:00	Ruflon Fernandes 11'		30' Anirudh Thapa

20 November 2015	Dempo U18	0–0	SAI-Goa U18	Navelim Ground
16:00

27 November 2015	Dempo U18	0–2	Sporting Goa U18	Navelim Ground
16:00			36', 78' Akeraj Martins

28 November 2015	SAI-Goa U18	0–6	AIFF Elite Academy U18	Nagoa Ground
16:00			16', 90' Rahul Yadav; 18' Jayananda Singh; 39', 52' Edmund Lalrindika; 72' Prosenjit Chakraborty

1 December 2015	Sporting Goa U18	3–2	Salgaocar 18	Don Bosco Ground
16:00	Akeraj Martins 32'; Daryl Costa 40'; Jesmon Soares 63'		42', 85' Llit Tariyal

4 December 2015	SAI-Goa U18	1–2	Salgaocar 18	Nagoa Ground
16:00	Anwar Sha 4'		41', 45+2' Ronaldo Oliveira

7 December 2015	AIFF Elite Academy U18	8–0	Dempo U18	Nagoa Ground
16:00	Edmund Lalrindika 3', 49', 65'; Rahul Yadav 21', 46', 47'; Jauananda Singh 63'; Prosenjit Chakroborty 70'

9 December 2015	Sporting Goa U18	4–0	SAI-Goa U18	Don Bosco Ground
16:00	Daryl Costa 47', 87'; Akeraj Martins 58', 61'

12 December 2015	Dempo U18	0–3	Salgaocar 18	Navelim Ground
16:00			27', 83' Liston Colaco; 30' Kaushik Negi

13 December 2015	AIFF Elite Academy U18	5–0	Sporting Goa U18	Nagoa Ground
16:00	Jerry Lalrianzuala 28'; Prosenjit Chakraborty 39', 48'; Anirudh Thapa 80'; Edmund Lalrindika 90+1'

16 December 2015	SAI-Goa U18	1–1	Dempo U18	Nagoa Ground
16:00	D Vignesh 68'		76' Ronil Azavedo

18 December 2015	AIFF Elite Academy U18	7–2	Salgaocar 18	Nagoa Ground
16:00	Deependra Singh Negi 8'; Anirudh Thapa 28'; Zonumawia 43', 72'; Bedashwar Singh 62', 69'; Baoringdao Bodo 81'		63', 82' Ronaldo Oliveira

== Group E - Rest of India Zone ==
All times are Indian Standard Time (IST) – UTC+05:30.

=== Group 1 ===
Pos	Team	Pld	W	D	L	GF	GA	GD	Pts	Qualification
1	Lonestar Kashmir U18	6	4	2	0	13	4	+9	14	Advance to final round
2	Minerva U18	6	3	1	2	16	4	+12	10	
3	Bengaluru FC U18	6	2	3	1	5	5	0	9	
4	Fateh Hyderabad U18	6	0	0	6	4	25	−21	0	

Source: Results & Fixtures: U-18 I-League
Rules for classification: 1) points; 2) head-to-head results; 3) head-to-head goal difference; 4) head-to-head goals scored; 5) goal difference 6) goals scored; 7) drawing of lots.

=== Fixtures and results ===
14 December 2015	Bengaluru FC U18	0–2	Minerva U18	Ludhiana
11:30			21' Rohit Jamal; 75' Shubham Sarangi	Stadium: Guru Nanak Stadium

14 December 2015	Fateh Hyderabad U18	1–6	Lonestar Kashmir U18	Ludhiana
14:30				Stadium: Guru Nanak Stadium

16 December 2015	Fateh Hyderabad U18	1–8	Minerva U18	Ludhiana
11:30	B Sai Kumar 32'		4', 42', 46', 54' Shubham Sarangi; 17', 55' Jatinder Kumar; 70' Salman Latfeet; 90+3' Anwar Ali	Stadium: Guru Nanak Stadium

16 December 2015	Bengaluru FC U18	2–2	Lonestar Kashmir U18	Ludhiana
14:30				Stadium: Guru Nanak Stadium

18 December 2015	Minerva U18	0-2	Lonestar Kashmir U18	Ludhiana
11:30			70' Aqib Mushtaque; 87' Asrar Rehbar	Stadium: Guru Nanak Stadium

18 December 2015	Bengaluru FC U18	1–0	Fateh Hyderabad U18	Ludhiana
14:30	S. Pawan 49'			Stadium: Guru Nanak Stadium

20 December 2015	Lonestar Kashmir U18	2–1	Fateh Hyderabad U18	Ludhiana
11:30	Waris Amin 52', 72'		24' Mviranjinelu	Stadium: Guru Nanak Stadium

20 December 2015	Minerva U18	0–0	Bengaluru U18	Ludhiana
14:30				Stadium: Guru Nanak Stadium

22 December 2015	Lonestar Kashmir U18	0–0	Bengaluru FC U18	Ludhiana
11:30				Stadium: Guru Nanak Stadium

22 December 2015	Minerva U18	6–0	Fateh Hyderabad U18	Ludhiana
14:30	Amarjeet Mishra 2', 34'; Shubham Sarangi 28', 38', 44'; Kamalpreet Singh 33'			Stadium: Guru Nanak Stadium

24 December 2015	Fateh Hyderabad U18	1–2	Bengaluru FC U18	Ludhiana
11:30	Mviranjinelu 9'		11' Prashanth Kalinga; 90+2' Kuldeep Singh	Stadium: Guru Nanak Stadium

24 December 2015	Lonestar Kashmir U18	1–0	Minerva U18	Ludhiana
14:30	Asrar Rehbar 37'			Stadium: Guru Nanak Stadium

=== Group 2 ===
Pos	Team	Pld	W	D	L	GF	GA	GD	Pts	Qualification
1	Aizawl U18	4	4	0	0	21	4	+17	12	Advance to final round
2	NEROCA U18	4	1	0	3	4	10	−6	3	
3	Gangtok Himalayan U18	4	1	0	3	6	17	−11	3	

Source: Results & Fixtures: U-18 I-League
Rules for classification: 1) points; 2) head-to-head results; 3) head-to-head goal difference; 4) head-to-head goals scored; 5) goal difference 6) goals scored; 7) drawing of lots.

==== Fixtures and results ====
14 December 2015	Gangtok Himalayan U18	2–6	Aizawl U18	Gangtok
13:00	Amrit Tamang 7', 38'		14', 81' Lalmuanzova; 22' Lalramramhmunmawia; 32' Rochharzela; 75', 86' Lalruatpuia	Stadium: Paljor Stadium

16 December 2015	NEROCA U18	1–3	Aizawl U18	Gangtok
13:00	M Chungmei 42'		36' Rochharzela; 49', 56' Lalruatpuia	Stadium: Paljor Stadium

18 December 2015	Gangtok Himalayan U18	3–2	NEROCA U18	Gangtok
13:00	Pranai Tiwari 11'; Amrit Tamang 19', 90+1'		63', 90+2' Yumnam Kishan Singh	Stadium: Paljor Stadium

20 December 2015	Aizawl U18	4–0	NEROCA U18	Gangtok
13:00	Rochharzela 18', 39'; Lalawmpuia Hnamte 55'; Lalruatpuia 82'			Stadium: Paljor Stadium

22 December 2015	NEROCA U18	1–0	Gangtok Himalayan U18	Gangtok
13:00	Thockhom Yaiphaba Singh 30'			Stadium: Paljor Stadium

24 December 2015	Aizawl U18	8–1	Gangtok Himalayan U18	Gangtok
13:00	Lalramramhmunmawia 13'; F Lalremsanga 17', 19'; Rochharzela 26', 72', 90+1'; Johny KVL Muanpuia 50', 79'		87' Pranai Tiwari	Stadium: Paljor Stadium

== Final round ==
Two teams each from Maharashtra, Kolkata–Jamshedpur, Shillong–Guwahati, Goa zone progressed to the final round, while one team each from two Rest of India zones advanced to the final round.

=== Group A ===
Pos	Team	Pld	W	D	L	GF	GA	GD	Pts	Qualification
1	AIFF Elite Academy U18	4	3	1	0	15	1	+14	10	Advance to Semi-finals
2	TATA FA U18	4	3	0	1	7	2	+5	9	Advance to Semi-finals
3	DSK Shivajians U18	4	2	1	1	10	3	+7	7	
4	SAI-Guwahati U18	4	1	0	3	6	10	−4	3	
5	Lonestar Kashmir U18	4	0	0	4	1	23	−22	0	

Source: Results & Fixtures: U-18 I-League
Rules for classification: 1) points; 2) head-to-head results; 3) head-to-head goal difference; 4) head-to-head goals scored; 5) goal difference 6) goals scored; 7) drawing of lots.

*All Group A matches were played in Howrah Municipal Corporation Stadium, Kolkata between 27 January to 4 February 2016.

=== Group B ===
*All Group B matches were played in East Bengal Ground, Kolkata between 27 January to 4 February 2016.

=== Bracket ===
All times are Indian Standard Time (IST) – UTC+05:30.

Semi-finals
AIFF Academy U18	3
Aizawl U18	0
Salgaocar U18	0
Tata Football Academy U18	2

Final
AIFF Academy U18	2
Tata Football Academy U18	0
Third place
Aizawl U18	1
Salgaocar U18	3

=== Semi-finals ===
7 February 2016
11:00

AIFF Academy U18	3–0	Aizawl U18
Vlalengzama 4', 25'; Prosenjit Chakroborty 29'	Report

Howrah Municipal Corporation Stadium, Howrah

7 February 2016
14:00

Salgaocar U18	0–2	Tata Football Academy U18
	Report	Shaikhom Ronald Singh 47', 64'

Howrah Municipal Corporation Stadium, Howrah

=== Third place ===
9 February 2016
13:00

Aizawl U18	1–3	Salgaocar U18
Lalmuanzova 60'	Report	Aldrich Gerald Coelho 38'; Liston Colaco 45+1'; Ronaldo Oliviera 81'

Howrah Municipal Corporation Stadium, Howrah

=== Final ===
10 February 2016
13:00

AIFF Academy U18	2–0	Tata Football Academy U18
Anirudh Thapa 33'; Vlalengzama	Report

Howrah Municipal Corporation Stadium, Howrah

== Statistics ==
=== Top scorers ===
Rank	Player	Club	Goals
1	(India) L. Lalawmpuia	Pune U18	14
2	(India) Lallianzuala Chhangte	DSK Shivajians U18	11
3	(India) Simranjit Singh	TFA U18	10
4	(India) Akeraj Martins	Sporting Goa U18	9
4	(India) Edmund Lalrindika	AIFF Elite Academy U18	9
4	(India) Ronaldo Oliveira	Salgaocar U18	9
7	(India) Shubham Sarangi	Minerva U18	8
7	(India) Rochharzela	Aizawl U18	8
7	(India) Rahul Yadav	AIFF Elite Academy U18	8
7	(India) Pranjal Bhumij	SAI-Guwahati U18	8

Source: I-League

=== Most assists ===
Rank	Player	Club	Assists
1	(India) M Mawihmingthanga	DSK Shivajians U18	6
2	(India) Sannik Murmu	Pune U18	5
3	(India) Jesse Ralte	DSK Shivajians U18	4
3	(India) Laishram Suraj Meitei	Royal Wahingdoh U18	4
3	(India) Kamalpreet Singh	Minerva U18	4
4	(India) Lalawmpuia Hnmate	Aizawl U18	3
4	(India) Suhail Sayed	DSK Shivajians U18	3
4	(India) Rochharzela	Aizawl U18	3
4	(India) Rohit Kumar	DSK Shivajians U18	3
4	(India) Shivam Pandey	Fateh Hyderabad U18	3

== See also ==
- 2015–16 I-League
- 2015 ISL Season
- 2015–16 I-League 2nd Division
