= 2014 I-League 2nd Division =

7th season of the I-League 2nd Division

I-League 2nd Division
- Season: 2013–14
- Champions: Royal Wahingdoh
- Promoted: Royal Wahingdoh
- Matches: 45
- Goals: 131 (2.91 per match)
- Biggest home win: Royal Wahingdoh 9-2 Garhwal (7 Feb 2014)
- Biggest away win: Garhwal 0-5 Kalighat MS (15 Feb 2014)
- Highest scoring: Royal Wahingdoh 9-2 Garhwal (7 Feb 2014)

The 2014 I-League 2nd Division was the seventh season of the I-League 2nd Division under its current title. The season began on 7 February 2014. It contained 11 clubs in two groups and twelfth club United Sikkim directly entered into final round. Royal Wahingdoh won the tournament and will be promoted to 2014–15 I-League.

== Team overview ==
=== Teams and locations ===
Team	Location
Aizawl	Aizawl, Mizoram
Bhawanipore	Kolkata, West Bengal
Eagles	Ernakulam, Kerala
Garhwal	New Delhi, Delhi
Green Valley	Guwahati, Assam
Hindustan	Delhi, Delhi
Kalighat MS	Kolkata, West Bengal
Kenkre	Mumbai, Maharashtra
MP United	Indore, Madhya Pradesh
PIFA	Mumbai, Maharashtra
Royal Wahingdoh	Shillong, Meghalaya
United Sikkim	Gangtok, Sikkim

== Group stage ==
=== Group A ===
- Matches to be played in Railway Stadium, Dhanbad

Pos	Team	Pld	W	D	L	GF	GA	GD	Pts	Qualification
1	Royal Wahingdoh	5	3	2	0	17	2	+15	11	Final Round
2	Kalighat Milan Sangha	5	3	2	0	12	2	+10	11	Final Round
3	Garhwal	5	3	0	2	10	15	−5	9	
4	Green Valley	5	2	1	2	5	5	0	7	
5	PIFA	5	1	1	3	3	7	−4	4	
6	MP United	5	0	0	5	2	18	−16	0	

Source: Global Sports Archive

7 February 2014	PIFA	1–1	Kalighat MS	Railway Stadium, Dhanbad
10:30 IST	Saha 9'		Gibilee 66'

7 February 2014	Royal Wahingdoh	9–2	Garhwal	Railway Stadium, Dhanbad
14:00 IST	Singh; Bekay; Babatunde 52'	report

8 February 2014	Green Valley	3–0	MP United	Railway Stadium, Dhanbad
14:00 IST	Pritam 50'; Stanley 51', 55'

9 February 2014	PIFA	0–2	Garhwal	Railway Stadium, Dhanbad
14:00 IST		report

10 February 2014	Kalighat MS	4–0	MP United	Railway Stadium, Dhanbad

10 February 2014	Royal Wahingdoh	0–0	Green Valley	Railway Stadium, Dhanbad

12 February 2014	PIFA	2–1	MP United	Railway Stadium, Dhanbad

12 January 2014	Garhwal	3–0	Green Valley	Railway Stadium, Dhanbad
		Report

13 January 2014	Kalighat MS	0–0	Royal Wahingdoh	Railway Stadium, Dhanbad

14 January 2014	Green Valley	1–0	PIFA	Railway Stadium, Dhanbad
14:30 IST

15 February 2014	Royal Wahingdoh	6–0	MP United	Railway Stadium, Dhanbad
09:30 IST

15 February 2014	Garhwal	0–5	Kalighat MS	Railway Stadium, Dhanbad
14:30 IST

17 February 2014	PIFA	0–2	Royal Wahingdoh	Railway Stadium, Dhanbad
09:30 IST

17 February 2014	Green Valley	1–2	Kalighat MS	Railway Stadium, Dhanbad
14:30 IST

18 February 2014	MP United	1–3	Garhwal	Railway Stadium, Dhanbad
14:30 IST

=== Group B ===
- Matches to be played in Paljor Stadium, Gangtok

Pos	Team	Pld	W	D	L	GF	GA	GD	Pts	Qualification
1	Hindustan	4	3	0	1	7	7	0	9	Final Round
2	Bhawanipore	4	2	1	1	8	3	+5	7	Final Round
3	Eagles	4	2	1	1	7	4	+3	7	
4	Aizawl	4	1	2	1	7	4	+3	5	
5	Kenkre	4	0	0	4	1	12	−11	0	

Source: Global Sports Archive

7 February 2014	Aizawl	1–1	Eagles	Paljor Stadium, Gangtok
	Lalnuntluanga 11'	Report	Sakibo 83'

7 February 2014	Kenkre	0–4	Bhawanipore	Paljor Stadium, Gangtok
		Report	Bedemi 7', 48'; Prasad 11'; Dowary 65'

9 February 2014	Hindustan	2–1	Aizawl	Paljor Stadium, Gangtok
	Kamei 45'; Sola 46'	Report	Lalnunzira 90+3'

9 February 2014	Bhawanipore	2–0	Eagles	Paljor Stadium, Gangtok
	D. Singh 16'; S. Dutta 90+2'	Report

11 February 2014	Aizawl	1–1	Bhawanipore	Paljor Stadium, Gangtok
	Aningo 8'	Report	Bedemi 16'

11 February 2014	Hindustan	2–1	Kenkre	Paljor Stadium, Gangtok
	Sola 30'; Kabui 48'	Report	Mhatre 59'

13 February 2014	Kenkre	0–4	Aizawl	Paljor Stadium, Gangtok
		Report	Michael 11'; Tluanga 38'; Albert 78'; David 86'

13 February 2014	Eagles	4–1	Hindustan	Paljor Stadium, Gangtok
	Sakibo 6'; Bhutia 52'; Felix 61'; Sujil 90+8'		Sola 82'

15 February 2014	Eagles	2–0	Kenkre	Paljor Stadium, Gangtok
11:15 IST	Felix 46'

15 February 2014	Hindustan	2–1	Bhawanipore	Paljor Stadium, Gangtok
14:00 IST

== Final round ==
Pos	Team	Pld	W	D	L	GF	GA	GD	Pts	Qualification or relegation
1	Royal Wahingdoh (C, P)	8	5	3	0	12	2	+10	18	Promotion to 2014–15 I-League
2	Bhawanipore	8	5	2	1	16	7	+9	17	
3	Kalighat MS	8	3	1	4	10	11	−1	10	
4	United Sikkim	8	2	1	5	9	12	−3	7	
5	Hindustan	8	1	1	6	6	17	−11	4	

Source: i-league.orgGlobal Sports Archive
Rules for classification: 1) points; 2) goal difference; 3) number of goals scored.
(C) Champions; (P) Promoted
