= Railway Stadium, Dhanbad =

Multi-propose ground in Dhanbad, Jharkhand, India

Railway Stadium
- Interactive map of Railway Stadium

Ground information
- Location: Dhanbad, Jharkhand
- Country: India
- Coordinates: 23.79228°N 86.43043°E
- Establishment: 2008
- Capacity: 5,000
- End names
- n/a

Team information
Jharkhand cricket team	(2008–present)
- As of 26 August, 2015; Source: Espncricinfo

Railway Stadium is a multi-purpose ground in Dhanbad, Jharkhand. The ground has hosted Five first-class and T20 matches for Jharkhand cricket team till 2014.

Railway Stadium was also venue for football matches of national level. But now it is converted into Cricket Stadium by the Railway management. The stadium station had a seating capacity for 5,000. The plate group matches of Cooch Behar Trophy were also held here in 2008 besides some Under-22 fixtures of the BCCI in 2010. In 2012, the ground hosted match of Dhanbad Premier League a local T20 league based on the Indian Premier League.

== I-League 2nd Division Matches ==
7 February 2014	PIFA	1–1	Kalighat MS	Railway Stadium, Dhanbad
10:30 IST	Saha 9'		Gibilee 66'

7 February 2014	Royal Wahingdoh	9–2	Garhwal	Railway Stadium, Dhanbad
14:00 IST	Singh; Bekay; Babatunde 52'	report

8 February 2014	Green Valley	3–0	MP United	Railway Stadium, Dhanbad
14:00 IST	Pritam 50'; Stanley 51', 55'

9 February 2014	PIFA	0–2	Garhwal	Railway Stadium, Dhanbad
14:00 IST		report

10 February 2014	Kalighat MS	4–0	MP United	Railway Stadium, Dhanbad

10 February 2014	Royal Wahingdoh	0–0	Green Valley	Railway Stadium, Dhanbad

12 February 2014	PIFA	2–1	MP United	Railway Stadium, Dhanbad

12 January 2014	Garhwal	3–0	Green Valley	Railway Stadium, Dhanbad
		Report

13 January 2014	Kalighat MS	0–0	Royal Wahingdoh	Railway Stadium, Dhanbad

14 January 2014	Green Valley	1–0	PIFA	Railway Stadium, Dhanbad
14:30 IST

15 February 2014	Royal Wahingdoh	6–0	MP United	Railway Stadium, Dhanbad
09:30 IST

15 February 2014	Garhwal	0–5	Kalighat MS	Railway Stadium, Dhanbad
14:30 IST

17 February 2014	PIFA	0–2	Royal Wahingdoh	Railway Stadium, Dhanbad
09:30 IST

17 February 2014	Green Valley	1–2	Kalighat MS	Railway Stadium, Dhanbad
14:30 IST

18 February 2014	MP United	1–3	Garhwal	Railway Stadium, Dhanbad
14:30 IST
