= 2015 Assam State Premier League =

Assam State Premier League
- Season: 2015
- Dates: 29 May – 25 July
- Teams: 12
- Champions: Karbi Anglong Morning Star FC (1st title)
- Matches played: 73
- Goals scored: 221 (3.03 per match)
- Best Player: (India) Sibra Narzary
- Top goalscorer: (Nigeria) Orok Essien (23 goals)
- Biggest home win: Trinayanjyoti FC 7–1 Barekuri FC (13 June)
- Biggest away win: Udalguri FC 0–8 Guwahati F.C. (24 June)
- Highest scoring: Trinayanjyoti FC 7–1 Barekuri FC (13 June); Udalguri FC 0–8 Guwahati F.C. (24 June)
- Longest winning run: Karbi Anglong Morning Star FC; F.C. Green Valley (7 games)
- Longest unbeaten run: Karbi Anglong Morning Star FC (remain unbeaten)
- Longest winless run: Jorhat Town Club (6 games)
- Longest losing run: Udalguri FC (5 games)
- Average attendance: 2699
- All statistics correct as of 23 October 2015.

The 2015 Assam State Premier League was the first season of the Assam State Premier League in its new format, and 8th as highest state-level league. The league was re-launched in May 2015 and was kicked off on 29 May, concluding with the final on 25 July.

Karbi Anglong Morning Star FC became champion of 2015 Assam State Premier League by defeating F.C. Green Valley in the final held at KASA Stadium, Diphu.

== Format ==
As per the new format of ASPL 2015 a total of 12 city-based clubs across Assam has been divided in Two Zonal Groups - Upper Assam Zonal Group and Lower Assam Zonal Group. At the Zonal Group Stage, each club shall play all the other 5 teams in the Group twice on Home and Away basis. At the end of the Zonal Group stage, top 4 Clubs from each group shall advance to the Final stage of ASPL 2015. The Final stage shall be played on knock-out format in Home and Away basis. Once the Zonal Group stage is over, there will be a draw for the Final stage.

== Key regulations ==
ASPL has introduced few key regulations to ensure future, all round development of the game of football in the state of Assam. As per the regulations, each team can register a maximum of 3 overseas player out of which only a maximum of 2 can be included in the playing XI. Each club shall also have to register a minimum of 6 players from its defined catchment area aged not more than 25 years and 6 Indian players aged not more than 20 years. Each club has to also include a minimum of 1 Catchment player and 1 U-20 player in its Playing XI.

As per the Regulation of ASPL 2015, each club shall be responsible to organize all of its Home matches and enjoy 70% of the gate revenue generated. The clubs shall also receive fixed assistance per match for all of its Away matches from the League.

== Prize money ==
ASPL 2015 offers lucrative prize money for all the participating clubs and is the highest ever for any Club competition in the state of Assam. The clubs eliminated from the Zonal Group stage shall receive INR 100,000 each as prize money. The clubs eliminated in the quarter-final Stage shall receive INR 150,000 each. The Clubs eliminated at the semi-final stage shall receive INR 250,000 each. The runner up shall receive INR 350,000 and the ASPL 2015 Champion club shall receive a prize money of INR 500,000.

In addition, there are several other prizes on offer, such as, Golden Ball winner (Best Player), Golden Boot winner (Highest Scorer), Golden Gloves (Best Goalkeeper), Best Defender, Best Midfielder, Best Overseas Player Best U-20 Player, Best Catchment Player etc.

== Teams ==
The list of clubs divided into two zones.

Locations of the ASPL Teams

Team	Location
Upper Assam Zone
Barekuri FC	Tinsukia
Golaghat Rhino FC	Golaghat
Jorhat Town Club	Jorhat
Moran Town Club	Moranhat
Karbi Anglong Morning Star FC	Diphu
Trinayanjyoti FC	Dibrugarh
Lower Assam Zone
Baarhoongkha AC	Kokrajhar
Global FC Gossaigaon	Gossaigaon
F.C. Green Valley	Guwahati
Guwahati F.C.	Guwahati
Tezpur United FC	Tezpur
Udalguri FC	Udalguri

== Round ==
Phase	Round	First leg	Second leg
Group stage	Matchday 1	29–31 May 2015	
Group stage	Matchday 2	3–7 June 2015	
Group stage	Matchday 3	10–14 June 2015	
Group stage	Matchday 4	17–21 June 2015	
Group stage	Matchday 5	24–28 June 2015	
Group stage	Matchday 6	2–7 July 2015	
Knockout phase	Quarter-finals	7–8 July 2015	11–12 July 2015
Knockout phase	Semi-finals	15–16 July 2015	18–19 July 2015
Knockout phase	Final	25 July 2015 at KSSA, Diphu	

== Group Stage League Table ==
=== Upper Assam Zone ===
Pos	Team	Pld	W	D	L	GF	GA	GD	Pts	Qualification	MS	TFC	MTC	RFC	BFC	JTC
1	Karbi Anglong Morning Star FC	10	9	1	0	30	5	+25	28	Advance to Quarter-finals	—	2–1	2–1	5–1	6–0	3–0
2	Trinayanjyoti FC	10	6	0	4	25	11	+14	18	Advance to Quarter-finals	1–2	—	2–0	4–0	7–1	1–2
3	Moran Town Club	10	5	1	4	13	18	−5	16	Advance to Quarter-finals	0–5	1–0	—	3–1	2–0	2–1
4	Golaghat Rhino FC	10	2	2	6	13	22	−9	8	Advance to Quarter-finals	1–3	1–2	5–1	—	1–2	1–1
5	Barekuri FC	10	2	2	6	8	25	−17	8		2–0	1–3	1–1	1–2	—	1–0
6	Jorhat Town Club	10	1	4	5	7	15	−8	7		0–0	1–4	1–2	0–0	1–1	—

Source: ASPLsoccer
29 May 2015
5:30PM IST

Karbi Anglong Morning Star FC	2–1	Trinayanjyoti FC

Diphu

30 May 2015
3:00PM IST

Moran Town Club	2–0	Barekuri FC

Sivasagar

31 May 2015
3:00PM IST

Jorhat Town Club	0–0	Golaghat Rhino FC

Jorhat

3 June 2015
3:00PM IST

Moran Town Club	0–5	Karbi Anglong Morning Star FC

Sivasagar

4 June 2015
3:00PM IST

Jorhat Town Club	1–1	Barekuri FC

Jorhat
4 June 2015
3:00PM IST

Trinayanjyoti FC	4–0	Golaghat Rhino FC

Dibrugarh

6 June 2015
5:30PM IST

Karbi Anglong Morning Star FC	3–0	Jorhat Town Club

Diphu

7 June 2015
3:00PM IST

Trinayanjyoti FC	2–0	Moran Town Club

Dibrugarh
7 June 2015
3:00PM IST

Barekuri FC	1–2	Golaghat Rhino FC

Tinsukia

10 June 2015
3:00PM IST

Trinayanjyoti FC	1–2	Jorhat Town Club

Dibrugarh
10 June 2015
5:30PM IST

Karbi Anglong Morning Star FC	6–0	Barekuri FC
A.K Martin 1' (o.g.); V. Kivi Zhimomi 3'; Orok Essien 9', 14', 67'; Sanjeeva Rongpi 90'	Report

Diphu

11 June 2015
3:00PM IST

Moran Town Club	3–1	Golaghat Rhino FC
Amol Bora 65'; Indrajit Sonowal 73'; Laldhuawma 75'	Report	Simanta Konwar 42'

Sivasagar

13 June 2015
3:00PM IST

Trinayanjyoti FC	7–1	Barekuri FC
Sankar Bagh 25', 60'; Chayaram Basumatary 34'; Abhijit Duwarah 54'; Sunday Oayuk 46', 74', 88'	Report	Eric Obiora 85'

Dibrugarh

14 June 2015
3:00PM IST

Moran Town Club	2–1	Jorhat Town Club
Hope Rally 17'; Dhabesh Daimary 59'	Report	Laltansanga 10'

Sivasagar
14 June 2015
5:30PM IST

Karbi Anglong Morning Star FC	5–1	Golaghat Rhino FC
Sibra Narzary 11', 83'; Orok Essien 26', 78'; Jelendra Bramha 33'	Report	Manjit Rabha 65'

Diphu

17 June 2015
3:00PM IST

Trinayanjyoti FC	1–2	Morning Star F.C.
Chayaram Basumatary 82'	Report	Orok Essien 56', 61'

Dibrugarh
17 June 2015
3:00PM IST

Barekuri FC	1–1	Moran Town Club
Eric Obiora 34'	Report	Dhabesh Daimariy 72'

Tinsukia

18 June 2015
5:30PM IST

Golaghat Rhino FC	1–1	Jorhat Town Club
Biju Barik 40'	Report	Lalamwiazuala 52'

Golaghat

20 June 2015
5:30PM IST

Karbi Anglong Morning Star FC	2–1	Moran Town Club
Orok Essien 10', 52'	Report	J. Laldhuawma 30'

Diphu

21 June 2015
3:00PM IST

Barekuri FC	1–0	Jorhat Town Club
Santosh Shutia 10'	Report

Tinsukia
21 June 2015
5:30PM IST

Golaghat Rhino FC	1–2	Trinayanjyoti FC
Faniyan Abidemi 63'	Report	Sonam Lepcha 2'; Sunday Ogar Ayuk 9'

Golaghat

24 June 2015
3:00PM IST

Jorhat Town Club	0–0	Karbi Anglong Morning Star FC

Jorhat
24 June 2015
3:00PM IST

Moran Town Club	1–0	Trinayanjyoti FC
Hope Rally 4'	Report

Sivasagar

25 June 2015
5:30PM IST

Golaghat Rhino FC	1–2	Barekuri FC
Gorachand Marandi 61'	Report	Shyam Murah 24'; Sahajyoti Kalita 27'

Golaghat

27 June 2015
3:00PM IST

Jorhat Town Club	1–4	Trinayanjyoti FC
Hemanta Garh 48'	Report	Sankar Bagh 15', 86'; Sunday Ogar Ayuk 68', 92'

Jorhat

28 June 2015
3:00PM IST

Barekuri FC	0–2	Karbi Anglong Morning Star FC
	Report	Orok Essien 19', 71'

Tinsukia
28 June 2015
5:30PM IST

Golaghat Rhino FC	5–1	Moran Town Club
F.O. Abidemi 15', 88'; Sirondeep Moran 41', 90+2'; Gorachand Marandi 45+3'	Report	Rizatmi Singh 23'

Golaghat

2 July 2015
3:00PM IST

Golaghat Rhino FC	1–3	Karbi Anglong Morning Star FC
Faniyan Abidemi 64'	Report	Michael Joute 44'; Orok Essien 48', 84'

Golaghat
2 July 2015
3:00PM IST

Barekuri FC	1–3	Trinayanjyoti FC
Santosh Shutia 53'	Report	Sunday Orok Ayuk 40'; Pedar Koch 63'; Sanam Lepcha 83'

Tinsukia
2 July 2015
3:00PM IST

Jorhat Town Club	1–2	Moran Town Club
Alan Lalhriatpuia 90+2'	Report	Hope Rally 11'; Dabesh Daimari 83'

Jorhat

=== Lower Assam Zone ===
Pos	Team	Pld	W	D	L	GF	GA	GD	Pts	Qualification	GV	BAC	TU	GU	GFC	UFC
1	F.C. Green Valley	10	8	1	1	18	5	+13	25	Advance to Quarter-finals	—	1–0	0–1	1–0	4–0	2–1
2	Baarhoongkha AC	10	6	0	4	19	11	+8	18	Advance to Quarter-finals	0–1	—	3–1	2–1	2–1	6–0
3	Tezpur United FC	10	4	1	5	8	12	−4	13	Advance to Quarter-finals	0–2	0–2	—	0–0	0–2	2–0
4	Guwahati F.C.	10	3	3	4	15	10	+5	12	Advance to Quarter-finals	1–1	2–1	1–2	—	1–0	1–3
5	Global FC	10	3	2	5	9	13	−4	11		2–3	2–3	1–0	0–0	—	1–0
6	Udalguri FC	10	2	1	7	7	25	−18	7		0–3	2–0	1–2	0–8	0–0	—

Source: ASPLsoccer
30 May 2015
3:00PM IST

Tezpur United FC	0–0	Guwahati F.C.

Tezpur

31 May 2015
3:00PM IST

Udalguri FC	0–0	Global FC Gossaigaon

Udalguri
31 May 2015
3:00PM IST

Baarhoongkha AC	0–1	F.C. Green Valley

Kokrajhar

3 June 2015
3:00PM IST

Tezpur United FC	2–0	Udalguri FC

Tezpur
3 June 2015
3:00PM IST

Baarhoongkha AC	2–1	Global FC Gossaigaon

Kokrajhar

4 June 2015
3:00PM IST

Guwahati F.C.	1–1	F.C. Green Valley

Guwahati

6 June 2015
3:00PM IST

Tezpur United FC	0–2	Baarhoongkha AC

Tezpur

7 June 2015
3:00PM IST

Guwahati F.C.	1–3	Udalguri FC

Guwahati
7 June 2015
5:30PM IST

Global FC Gossaigaon	2–3	F.C. Green Valley

Gossaigaon

10 June 2015
3:00PM IST

Tezpur United FC	0–2	Global FC Gossaigaon

Tezpur
10 June 2015
3:00PM IST

Guwahati F.C.	2–1	Baarhoongkha AC

Guwahati

11 June 2015
3:00PM IST

Udalguri FC	0–3	F.C. Green Valley

Udalguri

13 June 2015
3:00PM IST

Guwahati F.C.	1–0	Global FC Gossaigaon

Guwahati

14 June 2015
3:00PM IST

Tezpur United FC	0–2	F.C. Green Valley

Tezpur
14 June 2015
3:00PM IST

Udalguri FC	2–0	Baarhoongkha AC

Udalguri

17 June 2015
3:00PM IST

Guwahati F.C.	1–2	Tezpur United FC

Guwahati
17 June 2015
5:30PM IST

Global FC Gossaigaon	1–0	Udalguri FC

Gossaigaon

18 June 2015
3:00PM IST

F.C. Green Valley	1–0	Baarhoongkha AC

Nehru Stadium, Guwahati

20 June 2015
3:00PM IST

Udalguri FC	1–2	Tezpur United FC

Udalguri

21 June 2015
3:00PM IST

F.C. Green Valley	1–0	Guwahati F.C.

Nehru Stadium, Guwahati
21 June 2015
5:30PM IST

Global FC Gossaigaon	2–3	Baarhoongkha AC

Gossaigaon

24 June 2015
3:00PM IST

Baarhoongkha AC	3–1	Tezpur United FC

Kokrajhar
24 June 2015
3:00PM IST

Udalguri FC	0–8	Guwahati F.C.

Udalguri

25 June 2015
3:00PM IST

F.C. Green Valley	4–0	Global FC Gossaigaon

Nehru Stadium, Guwahati

27 June 2015
3:00PM IST

Baarhoongkha AC	2–1	Guwahati F.C.

Kokrajhar

28 June 2015
3:00PM IST

Global FC Gossaigaon	1–0	Tezpur United FC

Gossaigaon
28 June 2015
3:00PM IST

F.C. Green Valley	2–1	Udalguri FC

Guwahati

2 July 2015
3:00PM IST

Golaghat Rhino FC	1–3	Karbi Anglong Morning Star FC

Golaghat
2 July 2015
3:00PM IST

Global FC Gossaigaon	1–1	Guwahati F.C.

Gossaigaon
2 July 2015
3:00PM IST

Baarhoongkha AC	6–0	Udalguri FC

Kokrajhar

== Knockout phase ==
=== Bracket ===
Quarter-finals
1	Karbi Anglong Morning Star FC	4	4	8
8	Tezpur United FC	0	1	1
4	Trinayanjyoti FC	2	3	5
5	Moran Town Club	2	2	4
2	Baarhoongkha AC	1	2	3
7	Guwahati F.C.	1	2	3
3	F.C. Green Valley	3	1	4
6	Golaghat Rhino FC	2	2	4

Semi-finals
Karbi Anglong Morning Star FC	2	2	4
Trinayanjyoti FC	0	1	1
Baarhoongkha AC	1	2	3
F.C. Green Valley	3	3	6

Final
Karbi Anglong Morning Star FC	2
F.C. Green Valley	1

== Quarter–finals ==
The first legs were played on 7 and 8 July, and the second legs were played on 11 and 12 July 2015.

Team 1	Agg.	Team 2	1st leg	2nd leg
F.C. Green Valley	4–4	Golaghat Rhino FC	3–2	2–1
Karbi Anglong Morning Star FC	8–1	Tezpur United FC	4–0	4–1
Baarhoongkha AC	3–3	Guwahati F.C.	1–1	2–2
Trinayanjyoti FC	5–4	Moran Town Club	2–2	3–2

=== First leg ===
7 July 2015
3:00PM IST

F.C. Green Valley	3–2	Golaghat Rhino FC
Micheal Lucky 36'; Rudra Boro 46'; George Prince 90'	Report	Bishal Hojai 2'; Sirondeep Moran 24'

Nehru Stadium, Guwahati

7 July 2015
3:00PM IST

Karbi Anglong Morning Star FC	4–0	Tezpur United FC
Lachit Borah 45'; V. Kivi Zhimomi 52', 70'; Shibra Narzary 55'	Report

Diphu

8 July 2015
3:00PM IST

Baarhoongkha AC	1–1	Guwahati F.C.
Ashok Brahma 16'	Report	Lalrinunga 51'

Kokrajhar

8 July 2015
3:00PM IST

Trinayanjyoti FC	2–2	Moran Town Club
53'; Sunday Ogar Ayuk 63'	Report	Hope Rally 3'; Rajkumar Panging 16'

Dibrugarh

=== Second leg ===
11 July 2015
3:00PM IST

Golaghat Rhino FC	1–2	F.C. Green Valley
Sirondeep Moran 45'	Report	Jagjit Singh 84'; Michael Lucky Kelechukwu 90+1'

Golaghat

12 July 2015
3:00PM IST

Tezpur United FC	1–4	Karbi Anglong Morning Star FC
Francis Oneyama 51'	Report	Orok Essien 13', 45'; V. Kivi Zhimomi 18'; Rakib Boro 32'

Tezpur

11 July 2015
3:00PM IST

Guwahati F.C.	2–2	Baarhoongkha AC
Newson Kom 50', 86'	Report	Nwukwu Michael Okudili 3', 71'

Nehru Stadium, Guwahati

12 July 2015
3:00PM IST

Moran Town Club	2–3	Trinayanjyoti FC
Hope Rally 23'; Dhabesh Daimary 59'	Report	Swnwam Basumatary 78'; Sunday Ogar Ayuk 87', 90+2'

Sivasagar

== Semi–finals ==
The first legs was played on 15 and 16 July, and the second legs was played on 18 and 19 July 2015.

Team 1	Agg.	Team 2	1st leg	2nd leg
Karbi Anglong Morning Star FC	4–1	Trinayanjyoti FC	2–0	2–1
Baarhoongkha AC	3–6	F.C. Green Valley	1–3	2–3

=== First leg ===
15 July 2015
6:30PM IST

Karbi Anglong Morning Star FC	2–0	Trinayanjyoti FC
Orok Essien 24'; Benjamin Hanse 34'	Report

Diphu

16 July 2015
3:00PM IST

F.C. Green Valley	3–1	Baarhoongkha AC
George Prince 9'; Rudra Boro 44', 90+1'	Report	Pranab Das 41'

Nehru Stadium, Guwahati

=== Second leg ===
18 July 2015
3:00PM IST

Trinayanjyoti FC	1–2	Karbi Anglong Morning Star FC
Sunday Ogar Ayuk 77'	Report	Orok Essien 67'; Jelendra Brahma 80'

Dibrugarh

19 July 2015
3:00PM IST

Baarhoongkha AC	2–3	F.C. Green Valley
Ashok Brahma 39'; N. Suraj Singh 45'	Report	Micheal Lucky 12'; George Prince 19'; Gaiham Rongmai 43'

Kokrajhar

== Final ==
The final was played on 25 July 2015 at KASA Stadium, Diphu.

25 July 2015
6:30PM

Karbi Anglong Morning Star FC	2–1	F.C. Green Valley
Immanuel L.Intaote 67'; Orok Essien 83'	Report	George Prince 53'

KASA Stadium, Diphu

== Statistics ==
=== Top scorers ===
Rank	Player	Club	Goals
1	(Nigeria) Orok Essien	Morning Star F.C.	23
2	(Nigeria) Sunday Ogar Ayuk	Trinayanjyoti FC	14
3	(Nigeria) Micheal Lucky	F.C. Green Valley	11
4	(Nigeria) David Opara	Guwahati F.C.	6
5	(Nigeria) George Prince	F.C. Green Valley	6

== Awards ==
List of awards winners.

=== Club awards ===
Award	Club
Champions	Morning Star F.C.
Runners-up	F.C. Green Valley
Fair Play Award	Morning Star F.C.

=== List of Individual Awards Winner ===
Award	Play	Club
Top Scorer	(Nigeria) Orok Essien	Morning Star F.C.
Best Player	(India) Sibra Narzary	Morning Star F.C.
Best Goalkeeper	(India) Mulya Rabha	Moran Town Club
Best Defender	(India) Maneswar Musahary	F.C. Green Valley
Best Midfielder	(India) C A Laldinsang Pudaite	Morning Star F.C.
Best U-20 Player	(India) Sonom Lepcha	Trinayanjyoti FC
Best Catchment Player	(India) Ashok Brahma	Baarhoongkha AC
Best Overseas Player	(Nigeria) Sunday Ogar Ayuk	Trinayanjyoti FC
Man of The Final	(Nigeria) Micheal lucky	F.C. Green Valley
Best Coach	(India) L Kamalakanta Singh	Morning Star F.C.

== See also ==
- Assam State Premier League
- Bordoloi Trophy
- Assam Football Association
- All India Football Federation
- Green Valley F.C.
