= 2015–16 I-League 2nd Division final round =

Tournament details
- Country: India
- Teams: 6

Final positions
- Champions: Dempo
- Runners-up: Minerva
- Third place: NEROCA
- Fourth place: Mohammedan

Tournament statistics
- Matches played: 30
- Goals scored: 70 (2.33 per match)
- All statistics correct as of 23 June 2016.

The 2015–16 I-League 2nd Division final round was the final round of 2015–16 I-League 2nd Division. Three teams each from Eastern Conference and Western Conference played in the final round. Dempo were the winner of the tournament, however in spite of earning the promotion, they withdrew from 2016–17 I-League.

== Teams ==
Locations of the I-League 2nd Division teams

The following teams have qualified for the final round:

Team	State	Home Ground	Capacity
Lone Star Kashmir	Jammu and Kashmir	Bakhshi Stadium	30,000
Mohammedan	West Bengal	Barasat Stadium	22,000
Dempo	Goa	Raia Panchayat Ground	6,000
NEROCA	Manipur	Khuman Lampak Main Stadium	26,000
Gangtok Himalayan	Sikkim	Paljor Stadium	25,000
Minerva	Punjab	Guru Nanak Stadium	15,000

== Table ==
Pos	Team	Pld	W	D	L	GF	GA	GD	Pts	Qualification
1	Dempo (C, P)	10	7	2	1	16	4	+12	23	Promotion to I-League
2	Minerva	10	5	3	2	14	11	+3	18	
3	NEROCA	10	5	2	3	13	11	+2	17	
4	Mohammedan (Note: 3 points are deducted from Mohammedan SC as per the decision taken by the FIFA Disciplinary Committee.)	10	4	3	3	10	8	+2	12	
5	Gangtok Himalayan	10	1	3	6	7	16	−9	6	
6	Lonestar Kashmir	10	1	1	8	10	20	−10	4	

Source: Results & Fixtures: 2nd Division I-League
Rules for classification: 1) points; 2) head-to-head points; 3) head-to-head goal difference; 4) goal difference; 5) number of goals scored; 6) play-off match
(C) Champions; (P) Promoted

=== Result table ===
Home \ Away	DSC	GHSC	LKFC	MAFC	MDSP	NFC
Dempo	—	3–0	4–1	3–1	0–0	3–0
Gangtok Himalayan	0–1	—	1–1	0–0	2–1	1–1
Lonestar Kashmir	0–1	3–2	—	2–3	0–1	1–3
Minerva	0–1	2–0	2–1	—	1–1	3–2
Mohammedan	0–0	3–1	1–0	1–2	—	2–0
NEROCA	2–0	1–1	2–1	0–0	2–0	—

Source: Results & Fixtures: 2nd Division
Legend: Blue = home team win; Yellow = draw; Red = away team win.

== See also ==
- 2015–16 I-League
- 2015–16 I-League 2nd Division
- 2015–16 I-League U18 final round
