= 2015–16 I-League 2nd Division =

9th season of the I-League 2nd Division

I-League 2nd Division
- Season: 2015–16
- Champions: Dempo
- Promoted: Minerva Punjab (Dempo pulled out)
- Matches: 40
- Goals: 92 (2.3 per match)
- Top goalscorer: Felix Chidi Odili; Atinder Mani (7 Goals each)
- Biggest home win: Kenkre 4–0 PIFA (18 December 2015) Dempo 4–0 Kenkre (27 December 2015)
- Biggest away win: PIFA 0–8 Dempo (17 January 2016)
- Highest scoring: PIFA 0–8 Dempo (17 January 2016)

The 2015–16 I-League 2nd Division was the ninth edition of the I-League 2nd division, the second-highest division in India.

== League structure ==
The 2015–16 I-League 2nd division matches to be played on a home and away basis. The preliminary rounds will be played in the ‘conference’ system with the teams being divided into Eastern and Western conferences. Top 3 teams from each conference will qualify for the final round of the 2015–2016 season of 2nd division I-League.

The 10-team I-League second division commenced on 14 November.

== Team overview ==
The following clubs participated in the 2nd Division League 2015–16, subject to fulfillment of the Club Licensing criteria.

Locations of the I-League 2nd Division teams

Team	State	Home Ground	Capacity
Kenkre	Maharashtra	Cooperage Ground	5,000
Lonestar Kashmir	Jammu and Kashmir	Bakhshi Stadium	30,000
Mohammedan	West Bengal	Barasat Stadium	22,000
Dempo	Goa	Raia Panchayat Ground	6,000
PIFA	Maharashtra	Cooperage Ground	5,000
Guwahati	Assam	Nehru Stadium, Guwahati	15,000
NEROCA	Manipur	Khuman Lampak Main Stadium	26,000
Fateh Hyderabad	Telangana	Lal Bahadur Shastri Stadium	25,000
Gangtok Himalayan	Sikkim	Paljor Stadium	30,000
Minerva	Punjab	Guru Nanak Stadium	15,000

=== Foreign players ===
Restricting the number of foreign players strictly to three per team. A team could use two foreign players on the field each game.

Club	Player 1	Player 2	Player 3
Dempo	(Nigeria) Chika Wali	(Nigeria) Felix Chidi Odili	—
Fateh Hyderabad	—	—	—
Gangtok Himalayan	(Nigeria) Samuel Kane	(Nigeria) Namdi Stephen Harry	(Ivory Coast) Leonce Dodoz
Guwahati	(Nigeria) Ugochukwu Godswill	(Nigeria) Oluwaunmi Somide	(Nigeria) Emmanuel Ini Oyoh
Kenkre	(Ivory Coast) Yao Kouassi Bernard	(Ivory Coast) Lassine Karamoko	(United States) Samuel Bradley
Lonestar Kashmir	(Nigeria) James Effiong	—	—
Minerva	(Nigeria) Alhassan Dahir Bala	(Nigeria) Kareem Omolaja	(Japan) Atsushi Yonezawa
Mohammedan	(Ivory Coast) Lancine Toure	(Zimbabwe) Simbarashe Gate	(South Sudan) James Moga
NEROCA	(Nigeria) Amamba Jerry Elekwachi	(Nigeria) Onwubuariri Ikechukwu Joseph	(Nigeria) Offor Emeka Christian
PIFA	(Guinea) Solileymane Sylla	—	—

== Group A - Eastern Conference ==
All times are Indian Standard Time (IST) – UTC+05:30.

=== Table ===
Pos	Team	Pld	W	D	L	GF	GA	GD	Pts	Qualification
1	Mohammedan	8	5	1	2	10	7	+3	16	Advance to Final Round
2	Gangtok Himalayan	8	3	4	1	9	4	+5	13	Advance to Final Round
3	NEROCA	8	3	3	2	7	5	+2	12	Advance to Final Round
4	Guwahati	8	2	3	3	9	8	+1	9	
5	Fateh Hyderabad	8	1	1	6	5	17	−12	4	

Source: Results & Fixtures: 2nd Division I-League

=== Fixtures and results ===
14 November 2015	NEROCA	0–0	Fateh Hyderabad	Imphal
13:30				Stadium: Khuman Lampak Main Stadium; Attendance: 12458; Referee: Anemesh Beswas

14 November 2015	Mohammedan	2–1	Guwahati	Barasat
14:00	Taurus Tecompleh Nanneh 42'; Ajay Singh (yellow card) 30' (goal) 44' (red card) 90+2'		(yellow card) 39' Kallol Pal; 87' (pen.) Oluwaunmi Somide; (yellow card) 90+2' Ugochukwu Godswill	Stadium: Barasat Stadium

21 November 2015	Guwahati	3–0	Fateh Hyderabad	Maligaon
14:00	Durga Boro 10'; Somide Adelaja 31'; James Singh 58' (yellow card) 75'		(yellow card) 15' Rohit Negi; (yellow card) 81' Pankaj Kshatri	Stadium: Northeast Frontier Railway Stadium

21 November 2015	Mohammedan	0–0	Gangtok Himalayan	Barasat
14:00	Taurus Tecompleh Manneh (yellow card) 8'; Mumtaz Akhtar (yellow card) 49'; Bikramjeet Singh (yellow card) 67'		(yellow card) 30' Samuel Kane; (yellow card) 64' Karan Atwal	Stadium: Barasat Stadium

28 November 2015	Guwahati	0–2	NEROCA	Maligaon
14:00			30' Onwubuariri Ikechukwu Joseph; 40' (pen.) Chingkhei Yumnam	Stadium: Northeast Frontier Railway Stadium; Referee: Pratik Mondal

28 November 2015	Fateh Hyderabad	0–2	Gangtok Himalayan	Hyderabad
15:00			18' Ong Lepcha; 22' (pen.) Badmus Babatunde	Stadium: Lal Bahadur Shastri Stadium

5 December 2015	Gangtok Himalayan	0–1	NEROCA	Gangtok
14:30			90+1' Ronald Singh	Stadium: Paljor Stadium

8 December 2015	Fateh Hyderabad	1–2	Mohammedan	Hyderabad
18:50	Nitin Jyal 14'		5' Deepak Kumar; 37' Ajay Singh	Stadium: Lal Bahadur Shastri Stadium

12 December 2015	NEROCA	2–1	Mohammedan	Imphal
13:30	Joseph 49'; Moirangthem Ashok 90+5'		73' Ajay Singh	Stadium: Khuman Lampak Main Stadium; Attendance: 15510

12 December 2015	Gangtok Himalayan	1–1	Guwahati	Gangtok
14:30	Badmus Babatunde 83'		19' Oluwaunmi Somide	Stadium: Paljor Stadium

19 December 2015	NEROCA	0–0	Guwahati	Imphal
13:30				Stadium: Khuman Lampak Main Stadium; Attendance: 11000

19 December 2015	Mohammedan	2–1	Fateh Hyderabad	Barasat
14:00	Tonmoy Ghosh 3'; Mumtaz Akhtar 68'		53' Shahil Bhatt	Stadium: Barasat Stadium

26 December 2015	Guwahati	0–3	Mohammedan	Guwahati
14:00				Stadium: Nehru Stadium

26 December 2015	Gangtok Himalayan	3–1	Fateh Hyderabad	Gangtok
14:30	Tenzing Tshepel 16'; Badmus Babatunde 22', 79'		53' Rohit Negi	Stadium: Paljor Stadium

2 January 2016	NEROCA	1–1	Gangtok Himalayan	Imphal
13:30	Chongtham Kishan Singh 78'		Babatunde 7'	Stadium: Khuman Lampak Main Stadium

4 January 2016	Fateh Hyderabad	0–4	Guwahati	Hyderabad
18:50			11', 67' Durga Boro; 50', 67' Oluwaunmi Somide	Stadium: Lal Bahadur Shastri Stadium

9 January 2016	Gangtok Himalayan	2–0	Mohammedan	Gangtok
14:30	Nima Tamang 45+1'; Thomas Tshering Lepcha 90+1'			Stadium: Paljor Stadium

11 January 2016	Fateh Hyderabad	2–1	NEROCA	Hyderabad
18:50	Shahil Bhatt 22', 23'		35' Amamba Jeremiah Elekwachi	Stadium: Lal Bahadur Shastri Stadium

16 January 2016	Guwahati	0–0	Gangtok Himalayan	Guwahati
14:00				Stadium: Nehru Stadium

16 January 2016	Mohammedan	1–0	NEROCA	Barasat
14:00	Basanta Singh			Stadium: Barasat Stadium

== Group B - Western Conference ==
All times are Indian Standard Time (IST) – UTC+05:30.

=== Table ===
Pos	Team	Pld	W	D	L	GF	GA	GD	Pts	Qualification
1	Minerva	8	6	1	1	16	3	+13	19	Advance to Final Round
2	Dempo	8	5	0	3	16	6	+10	15	Advance to Final Round
3	Lonestar Kashmir	8	3	4	1	10	5	+5	13	Advance to Final Round
4	Kenkre	8	1	3	4	6	11	−5	6	
5	PIFA	8	0	2	6	3	26	−23	2	

Source: Results & Fixtures: 2nd Division I-League

=== Fixtures and results ===
15 November 2015	Dempo	1–0	PIFA	Raia
16:00	Milagres Gonsalves (yellow card) 12'; 43' (pen.)		(yellow card) 42' Karun Kumar RS	Stadium: Raia Panchayat Ground; Referee: Fasi Salahudeen

16 November 2015	Kenkre	0–0	Lonestar Kashmir	Mumbai
18:30	Deepak Prakash (yellow card) 23'			Stadium: Cooperage Ground; Referee: William Koshy

19 November 2015	Kenkre	0–2	Minerva	Mumbai
18:30	Shivakumar M (yellow card) 39'; Aravindraj Ranjan (yellow card) 59'		(yellow card) 13' Bala Alhassan; 60' (pen.) Harpreet Bedi; 74' Simranjit Singh	Stadium: Cooperage Ground; Referee: K Radhakrishnan

21 November 2015	Dempo	0–3	Lonestar Kashmir	Raia
16:00	Asheer Akhtar (yellow card) 37'		21' Atinder Mani; 55', 65' Farukh Choudhary	Stadium: Raia Panchayat Ground

29 November 2015	Minerva	2–1	Lonestar Kashmir	Ludhiana
14:30	Jagpreet Singh 38'; Bala Alhassan 84'		43' Iffam Tariq	Stadium: Guru Nanak Stadium

29 November 2015	Kenkre	1–1	PIFA	Bhiwandi
15:30	Rishad P P 12'		33' Francisco Dominic	Stadium: All Saints School

6 December 2015	Minerva	1–0	Dempo	Ludhiana
14:30	Manvir Singh 40'			Stadium: Guru Nanak Stadium

6 December 2015	Lonestar Kashmir	2–2	PIFA	Srinagar
14:00	Farukh Choudhary 55', 89'		33' Irfan Khan; 90+2' Junaid	Stadium: Synthetic Turf Football Stadium; Attendance: 7540

11 December 2015	Minerva	3–0	PIFA	Ludhiana
14:30	Sehijpal Singh 19'; Kamalpreet Singh 37'; Dilliram Sanyasi 85'			Stadium: Guru Nanak Stadium

15 December 2015	Kenkre	0–1	Dempo	Mumbai
19:00			90' Peter Carvalho	Stadium: Cooperage Ground

18 December 2015	Kenkre	4–0	PIFA	Mumbai
19:00	Egypsio Noronha 9'; Loukik Jadhav 17'; Yao Kouassi Bernard 45'; Prathamesh Rokade 48'			Stadium: Cooperage Ground

20 December 2015	Lonestar Kashmir	0–0	Minerva	Srinagar
16:00				Stadium: Synthetic Turf Football Stadium

27 December 2015	Dempo	4–0	Kenkre	Vasco
16:00	Milagres Gonsalves 9', 85'; Beevan D'Mello 27', 35'			Stadium: Tilak Maidan Stadium

3 January 2016	PIFA	0–2	Lonestar Kashmir	Bhiwandi
15:30			68', 83' Atinder Mani	Stadium: All Saints School

3 January 2016	Dempo	2–1	Minerva	Vasco
16:00	Beevan D'Mello 2'; Milagres Gonsalves 61'		88' Sehijpal Singh	Stadium: Tilak Maidan Stadium

7 January 2016	PIFA	0–5	Minerva	Bhiwandi
15:30			Aji Demengje 41' 51'; Sehijpal Singh 53'; Prabhjot Singh 64' 83'	Stadium: All Saints School

10 January 2016	Lonestar Kashmir	1–0	Dempo	Srinagar
16:00	Gagandeep Singh 7'			Stadium: Synthetic Turf Football Stadium

12 January 2016	Minerva	2–0	Kenkre	Ludhiana
14:30	Manvir Singh 9', 17'			Stadium: Guru Nanak Stadium

17 January 2016	PIFA	0–8	Dempo	Bhiwandi
15:30			19' Beevan D'Mello; 32' Shallum Pires; 39' Chika Wali; 43', 84' Kapil Hoble; 45+1', 64' Felix; 90+2' Nickson Castanha	Stadium: All Saints School

17 January 2016	Lonestar Kashmir	1–1	Kenkre	Srinagar
16:00	Atinder Mani 85'		44' Arish Sutaria	Stadium: Synthetic Turf Football Stadium

== Final round ==
Pos	Team	Pld	W	D	L	GF	GA	GD	Pts	Qualification
1	Dempo (C, P)	10	7	2	1	16	4	+12	23	Promotion to I-League
2	Minerva	10	5	3	2	14	11	+3	18	
3	NEROCA	10	5	2	3	13	11	+2	17	
4	Mohammedan (Note: 3 points are deducted from Mohammedan SC as per the decision taken by the FIFA Disciplinary Committee.)	10	4	3	3	10	8	+2	12	
5	Gangtok Himalayan	10	1	3	6	7	16	−9	6	
6	Lonestar Kashmir	10	1	1	8	10	20	−10	4	

Source: Results & Fixtures: 2nd Division I-League
Rules for classification: 1) points; 2) head-to-head points; 3) head-to-head goal difference; 4) goal difference; 5) number of goals scored; 6) play-off match
(C) Champions; (P) Promoted

== Statistics ==
As of 6 June 2016

=== Top scorers ===
Rank	Player	Team	Goals	Apps.
1	(Nigeria) Felix Chidi Odili	Dempo	7	11
2	(India) Atinder Mani	Lonestar Kashmir	7	17
3	(South Sudan) James Moga	Mohammedan	6	4
4	(India) Milagres Gonsalves	Dempo	6	7
5	(India) Ajay Singh	Mohammedan	6	15
6	(India) Farukh Choudhary	Lonestar Kashmir	6	18
7	(Nigeria) Oluwaunmi Somide	Guwahati	5	7
8	(Nigeria) Badmus Babatunde	Gangtok Himalayan	5	7
9	(Nigeria) Kareem Omolaja	Minerva	4	9
10	(Ivory Coast) Leonce Dodoz Zikahi	Gangtok Himalayan	4	9

== See also ==
- 2015–16 I-League
- 2015 ISL Season
- 2015–16 I-League U18
