= MP United FC =

MP United FC may refer to:

- MP United FC (India), an association football club from Madhya Pradesh, India
- MP United FC (Northern Mariana Islands), an association football club from the Northern Mariana Islands
