= Durga Boro =

Indian footballer (born 1987)

Personal information
- Date of birth: 28 January 1987 (age 39)
- Place of birth: Gendrabil, Assam, India
- Height: 1.73 m (5 ft 8 in)
- Position: Striker

Youth career
- SAI

Senior career*
Years	Team	Apps	(Gls)
2004–2009	Oil India		
2009–2012	Churchill Brothers		
2012–2014	Mumbai Tigers		
2014	→ Shillong Lajong (loan)	6	(1)
2014–	Shillong Lajong	13	(1)
2014	→ NorthEast United (loan)	11	(1)
2015	NEROCA		
2015–16	Guwahati	7	(3)
2017	Ozone	4	(0)
- * Club domestic league appearances and goals as of 14:14, 3 March 2018 (UTC)

Durga Boro (born 28 January 1987) is an Indian former professional footballer who played as a striker.

== Career ==
=== Early career ===
Born in the small village of Gendrabil, in the Kokrajhar district of Assam, Boro started playing his football for the Kokrajhar HNMP School, for which he played for the team in the Subroto Cup under-14 tournament. Then, after impressing during the Subroto Cup, Boro started to train with the Sports Authority of India in Guwahati.

=== Oil India ===
In 2004 Boro signed with Oil India and played with them in the Assam State Premier League and the I-League 2nd Division while also working for the company itself.

=== Churchill Brothers ===
After an impressive performance during the Federation Cup in Kolkata in 2009 in which Boro and Oil India played against I-League sides such as Mohun Bagan, Vasco, and Air India, he signed his first professional contract with fellow I-League side, Churchill Brothers. The move to a professional club was massive for Boro as that meant he would be granted one-year leave from his former day-job with Oil India and he would move into a more professional footballing environment which included free food and travel. Boro scored his first professional goal for Churchill Brothers on 8 January 2011 against Salgaocar, however, his 34th-minute strike could not prevent Churchill Brothers from losing 3–4.

=== Mumbai Tigers ===
After spending two seasons with Churchill Brothers, Boro made a surprising move by signing for upstart I-League 2nd Division club Mumbai Tigers, then known as Dodsal FC. While with Mumbai Tigers, Boro played for the side during the I-League 2nd Division season.

=== Shillong Lajong ===
After Mumbai Tigers disbanded, on 6 February 2014 Boro made his return to the I-League after he signed for Shillong Lajong. This was Lajong's third attempt at signing Boro after they attempted to sign him in both 2009 and 2012. He made his debut for Shillong Lajong on 23 February 2014 against United. Boro started the match and even scored a goal as Shillong Lajong drew the match 2–2.

==== NorthEast United (loan) ====
In the summer of 2014 it was announced that Boro and a bunch of other Shillong Lajong players would sign on loan for the Indian Super League side NorthEast United. Boro made his debut for NorthEast United during the team's first ever game on 13 October 2014 against Kerala Blasters. He started the match and played 62 minutes as NorthEast United won 1–0. Boro eventually scored his first goal for the team on 27 November 2014 against Chennaiyin. His 10th-minute strike contributed to a 3–0 victory for NorthEast United.

== Career statistics ==
As of 30 May 2015

Club	Season	League			League Cup		Domestic Cup		AFC		Total	
Club	Season	Division	Apps	Goals	Apps	Goals	Apps	Goals	Apps	Goals	Apps	Goals
Shillong Lajong (loan)	2013–14	I-League	6	1	0	0	—	—	—	—	6	1
NorthEast United (loan)	2014	ISL	11	1	—	—	—	—	—	—	11	1
Shillong Lajong	2013–14	I-League	13	1	0	0	—	—	—	—	13	1
Career total			30	3	0	0	0	0	0	0	30	3
