= Kalighat Milan Sangha FC =

Indian association football club

Kalighat MS কালীঘাট এমএস
- Full name: Kalighat Milan Sangha Football Club
- Nicknames: Milan Sangha (Bengali: মিলন সংঘ)
- Short name: KMSFC
- Founded: 1944; 82 years ago
- Ground: Rabindra Sarobar Stadium
- Capacity: 22,000
- Owner: B. Harish Chatterjee
- Head coach: Patam Bahadur Thapa
- League: CFL Premier Division
Home colours	Away colours

Kalighat Milan Sangha Football Club (Bengali: কালীঘাট মিলন সংঘ ফুটবল ক্লাব) (known simply as Kalighat MS, formerly Kalighat Club) is an Indian multi-sports club based in Kalighat, Kolkata, West Bengal. Its football team currently competes in the Premier Division of the Calcutta Football League.

Founded in 1944, the club has mostly been amateur, but in January 2012 it moved into professional football when it was included in the I-League 2nd Division, then second tier of Indian football league system.

== History ==
=== Formation and journey ===
Kalighat Milan Sangha was founded in 1944, in Kalighat, Kolkata, as a cultural association club and has since grown step by step from district to state and national level outfit. The club is continuation of Kalighat Club, formed long ago, that left Indian Football Association in 1939 with Mohammedan and East Bengal to form BFA, but rejoined later. In 1966, the club started its football team through competing in Allen League under license from Indian Football Association (IFA). The club qualified to the first division of the Calcutta Football League for the first time in 1989.

=== Present years ===
They secured a place in the Calcutta Premier Division for the first time in 2009. Winning the 2011 edition of the All Airlines Gold Cup was the club's biggest achievement.

In January 2012, it was officially certified by the All India Football Federation to participate in the I-League 2nd Division, and reached to the final round. They also participated in the 2013 I-League 2nd Division. In 2014 Sikkim Gold Cup, Kalighat Milan Sangha reached the semi-final but lost 1–0 to Manang Marshyangdi of Nepal at the end. They also participated in the 2014 I-League 2nd Division and moved to the final round, finishing third with 14 points in 8 matches. Later in 2018, the club reached semi-finals of Darjeeling Gold Cup. They participated in 2020 IFA Shield, reaching the quarter-finals.

Besides football, the club has joined the fight against COVID-19 pandemic in West Bengal from May 2021 by providing free vaccinations to people. In July 2022, they participated in Naihati Gold Cup. After its relegation to the Premier Division B in 2021, Kalighat MS gained its promotion to Premier Division A after winning the 2022 season.

In June 2023, the Indian Football Association (IFA) announced merger of both the Premier Division A and B of the Calcutta Football League, ahead of its 125th edition, in which Kalighat MS was allowed to compete in Group I. In November 2024, the club took part in the 40th edition of the Sikkim Gold Cup.

== Home stadium ==
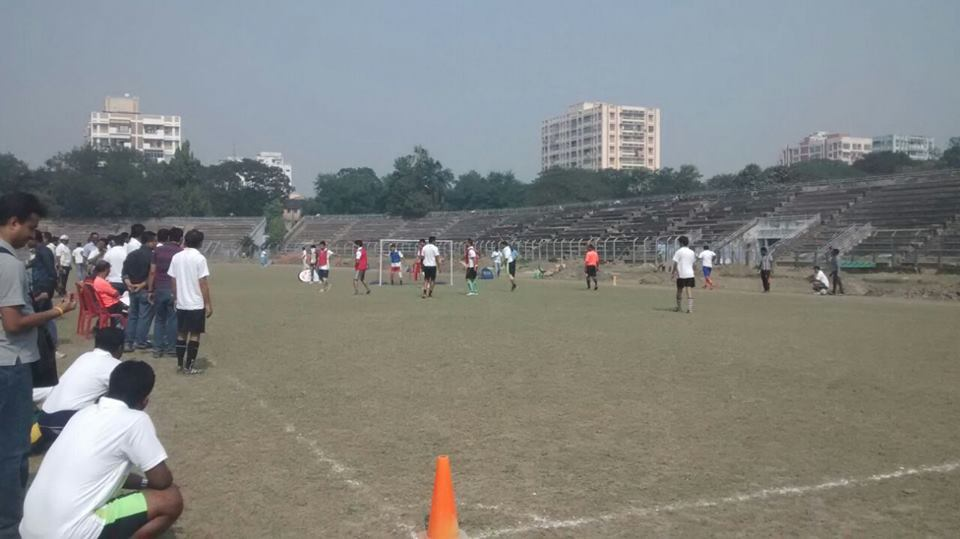
Rabindra Sarobar Stadium on a matchday before renovation

Kalighat MS has played all their home matches for previous editions of the National Football League at the Salt Lake Stadium.

In Calcutta Football League, the club also plays at the Rabindra Sarobar Stadium, which is commonly known as Lake Stadium and has a seating capacity of 22,000 spectators.

== Ownership ==
The club is owned by Kalighat Milan Sangha Football Club Private Limited, which is a non-governmental company incorporated on 18 November 2011. Ajit Banerjee and Abesh Banerjee served as the board members and directors.

== Other departments ==
=== Men's cricket ===
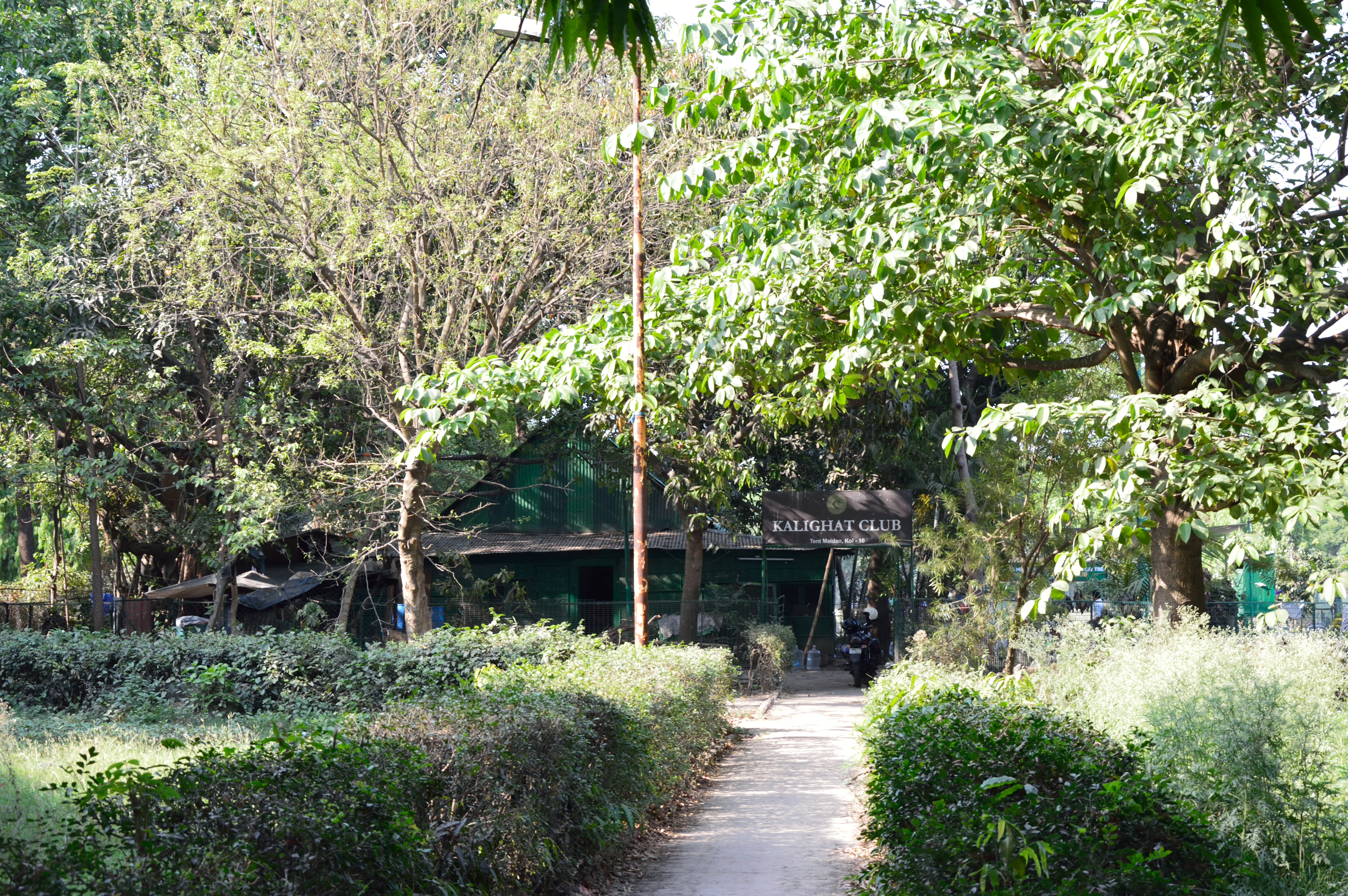
Front view of Kalighat Club tent in Kolkata Maidan in 2013

Club's men's cricket section is known as "Kalighat Club", and is currently based in Outram Road, Maidan Tent, Kolkata. They use Kolkata Maidan fields for practice and plays at Kalighat ground. They often play at the Eden Gardens. The cricket section is situated at Outram Road, Tent Maidan, near Park Street, Kolkata. The cricket team, primarily competes in the Cricket Association of Bengal (CAB) First Division tournament, and also participate tournaments like JC Mukherjee T-20 Trophy, A.N. Ghosh Memorial Trophy, CAB One Day League and P. Sen Trophy.

In May 2018, Indian international Wriddhiman Saha opened a cricket coaching camp (Kalighat MS–P. Sen memorial coaching camp) at the Kalighat Club to nurture young talents. The club also operates women's cricket section, that takes part in CAB Women's Club T20 League annually.

Honours

- J. C. Mukherjee Trophy
  - Runners-up (2): 2016–17, 2024–25
- CAB First Division Championship
  - Winners (1): 2022–23
  - Runners-up (1): 2021–22

=== Football (youth) ===
- Kalighat MS U19

In 2014, Kalighat Milan Sangha launched its U19 team to participate in the Elite League (India). The U19 team was first participated in the league during the 2014 I-League U19 season from Kolkata zone", but failed to qualify for the final round.

== Honours ==
=== League ===
- I-League 2nd Division
  - Third place (1): 2014
- CFL Premier Division B/CFL Second Division
  - Champions (4): 2003, 2008, 2018–19, 2022

=== Cup ===
- All Airlines Gold Cup
  - Champions (1): 2011
- Kalinga Cup
  - Runners-up (1): 2014

== See also ==
- List of football clubs in Kolkata
- Football in Kolkata
