= 2015–16 I-League U18 final round =

Tournament details
- Country: India
- Dates: 24 January–10 February 2016
- Teams: 10

Final positions
- Champions: AIFF Elite Academy
- Runners-up: Tata Football Academy

Tournament statistics
- Matches played: 24
- Goals scored: 68 (2.83 per match)

The 2015–16 I-League U18 final round will be the sixth final round series at the end of the I-League U18 season. The final round will begin on 27 January 2016 and culminate on 10 February 2016 with the final. AIFF Elite Academy won the title by defeating Tata Football Academy 2–0 in the final.

== Qualification ==
=== Group A ===
Pos	Team	Pld	W	D	L	GF	GA	GD	Pts	Qualification
1	AIFF Elite Academy U18	4	3	1	0	15	1	+14	10	Advance to Semi-finals
2	TATA FA U18	4	3	0	1	7	2	+5	9	Advance to Semi-finals
3	DSK Shivajians U18	4	2	1	1	10	3	+7	7	
4	SAI-Guwahati U18	4	1	0	3	6	10	−4	3	
5	Lonestar Kashmir U18	4	0	0	4	1	23	−22	0	

Source: Results & Fixtures: U-18 I-League
Rules for classification: 1) points; 2) head-to-head results; 3) head-to-head goal difference; 4) head-to-head goals scored; 5) goal difference 6) goals scored; 7) drawing of lots.

==== Fixtures and results ====
27 January 2016	Lonestar Kashmir U18	0–4	Tata FA U18	Howrah
11:00			13', 31' Ronand Singh; 37', 78' Seineo Kuki	Stadium: Howrah Municipal Corporation Stadium

27 January 2016	AIFF Academy U18	3–0	SAI-Guwahati U18	Howrah
14:00	Edmund Lalrindika 42'; Bedashwar Singh 67'; Baodingrao Bodo 88'			Stadium: Howrah Municipal Corporation Stadium

29 January 2016	DSK Shivajians U18	0–0	AIFF Academy U18	Howrah
11:00				Stadium: Howrah Municipal Corporation Stadium

29 January 2016	SAI-Guwahati U18	5–0	Lonestar Kashmir U18	Howrah
14:00	Sh Paukhanmung 54'; Pranjal Bhumji 51', 76'; K. Omesh Singh 41', 66'			Stadium: Howrah Municipal Corporation Stadium

31 January 2016	SAI-Guwahati U18	0–1	Tata FA U18	Howrah
11:00			26' Mobashir Rahman	Stadium: Howrah Municipal Corporation Stadium

31 January 2016	DSK Shivajians U18	4–0	Lonestar Kashmir U18	Howrah
14:00	Lallianzuala Chhangte 12', 26'; Lalruatpuia 21'; M Mawihmingthanga 90'			Stadium: Howrah Municipal Corporation Stadium

2 February 2016	Lonestar Kashmir U18	1–10	AIFF Academy U18	Howrah
11:00	Goal		Edmund Lalrindika; Prosenjit Chakroborty; Surya Tirkey; Yadav Rahul; Santosh Kumar; Bedashwar Singh; Jerry Lalrinzuala.	Stadium: Howrah Municipal Corporation Stadium

2 February 2016	Tata FA U18	2–0	DSK Shivajians U18	Howrah
14:00	Ronald Singh 20'; Mobashir Rahman 40'			Stadium: Howrah Municipal Corporation Stadium

4 February 2016	DSK Shivajians U18	6–1	SAI-Guwahati U18	Howrah
11:00	Gagandeep Singh 12'; Hitova Ayemi 30'; K Prasanth 67'; Azaruddin SK 22', 72'; Mebanshan Suting 77'			Stadium: Howrah Municipal Corporation Stadium

4 February 2016	AIFF Academy U18	2–0	Tata FA U18	Howrah
14:00	Yadav Rahul 45'; Amal Das 48'			Stadium: Howrah Municipal Corporation Stadium

=== Group B ===
Pos	Team	Pld	W	D	L	GF	GA	GD	Pts	Qualification
1	Salgaocar U18	4	3	0	1	5	3	+2	9	Advance to Semi-finals
2	Aizawl U18	4	2	2	0	5	1	+4	8	Advance to Semi-finals
3	Pune U18	4	1	2	1	3	3	0	5	
4	Royal Wahingdoh U18	4	1	1	2	2	4	−2	4	
5	East Bengal U18	4	0	1	3	3	7	−4	1	

Source: Results & Fixtures: U-18 I-League
Rules for classification: 1) points; 2) head-to-head results; 3) head-to-head goal difference; 4) head-to-head goals scored; 5) goal difference 6) goals scored; 7) drawing of lots.

==== Fixtures and results ====
27 January 2016	Aizawl U18	1–1	Royal Wahingdoh U18	Kolkata
11:00	Lalrinchhana 59'		47' Suraj Rawat	Stadium: East Bengal Ground

27 January 2016	Salgaocar U18	2–1	East Bengal U18	Kolkata
14:00	Liston Colaco 31', 46'		89' Tanmoy Ghosh	Stadium: East Bengal Ground

29 January 2016	Pune U18	0–1	Salgaocar U18	Kolkata
11:00			21' Liston Colaco	Stadium: East Bengal Ground

29 January 2016	East Bengal U18	0–2	Aizawl U18	Kolkata
14:00			43' Lalrinchhama; 83' Rochharzela	Stadium: East Bengal Ground

31 January 2016	East Bengal U18	0–1	Royal Wahingdoh U18	Kolkata
11:00			80' Narayan	Stadium: East Bengal Ground

31 January 2016	Pune U18	0–0	Aizawl U18	Kolkata
14:00				Stadium: East Bengal Ground

2 February 2016	Aizawl U18	2–0	Salgaocar U18	Kolkata
11:00	F Lalremsanga 34', 79'			Stadium: East Bengal Ground

2 February 2016	Royal Wahingdoh U18	0–1	Pune U18	Kolkata
14:00			50' Chesterpaul Lyngdoh	Stadium: East Bengal Ground

4 February 2016	Pune U18	2–2	East Bengal U18	Kolkata
11:00	Chesterpaul Lyngdoh 20', 40'		28' Indrajeet Chettri; 70' Rahul Roy	Stadium: East Bengal Ground

4 February 2016	Salgaocar U18	2–0	Royal Wahingdoh U18	Kolkata
14:00	Liston Colaco 72'; Stephen Satardekar 76'			Stadium: East Bengal Ground

== Bracket ==
All times are Indian Standard Time (IST) – UTC+05:30.

Semi-Finals
AIFF Academy U18	3
Aizawl U18	0
Salgaocar U18	0
Tata Football Academy U18	2

Final
AIFF Academy U18	2
Tata Football Academy U18	0
Third place
Aizawl U18	1
Salgaocar U18	3

== Semi-finals ==
7 February 2016
11:00

AIFF Academy U18	3–0	Aizawl U18
Vlalengzama 4', 25'; Prosenjit Chakroborty 29'	Report

Howrah Municipal Corporation Stadium, Howrah

7 February 2016
14:00

Salgaocar U18	0–2	Tata Football Academy U18
	Report	Shaikhom Ronald Singh 47', 64'

Howrah Municipal Corporation Stadium, Howrah

== Third place ==
9 February 2016
13:00

Aizawl U18	1–3	Salgaocar U18
Lalmuanzova 60'	Report	Aldrich Gerald Coelho 38'; Liston Colaco 45+1'; Ronaldo Oliviera 81'

Howrah Municipal Corporation Stadium, Howrah

== Final ==
10 February 2016
13:00

AIFF Academy U18	2–0	Tata Football Academy U18
Anirudh Thapa 33'; Vlalengzama	Report

Howrah Municipal Corporation Stadium, Howrah

== See also ==
- 2015–16 I-League
- 2015–16 I-League 2nd Division final round
