= FC Green Valley =

Indian association football club based in Guwahati

Green Valley
- Full name: Football Club Green Valley
- Nickname: The Emerald Panthers
- Short name: FCGV
- Founded: 2010; 16 years ago
- Ground: Nehru Stadium
- Capacity: 15,000
- Owner: FC Green Valley Ltd.
- Chairman: Pulak Goswami
- Head coach: Vivek Singh
- League: Assam State Premier League; Guwahati Premier Football League
Home colours	Away colours

Green Valley Football Club (simply known as FC Green Valley) is an Indian professional football club based in Guwahati, Assam. Formed in 2010, the club went straight into professional football and got accepted into the I-League 2, the third tier of the Indian football league system. It currently competes in the regional top division Assam State Premier League, Guwahati Premier Football League and earlier in the GSA A Division Football League.

== History ==
Green Valley Football Club was founded in 2010 in Assam. In January 2012 they were officially certified by the All India Football Federation to participate in the I-League 2nd Division, the second tier of football in India. They finished 4th out of 7 teams in the group stage. They have also participated in the 2013 I-League 2nd Division, finishing 8th out of 9 teams in group B.

== Home stadium ==
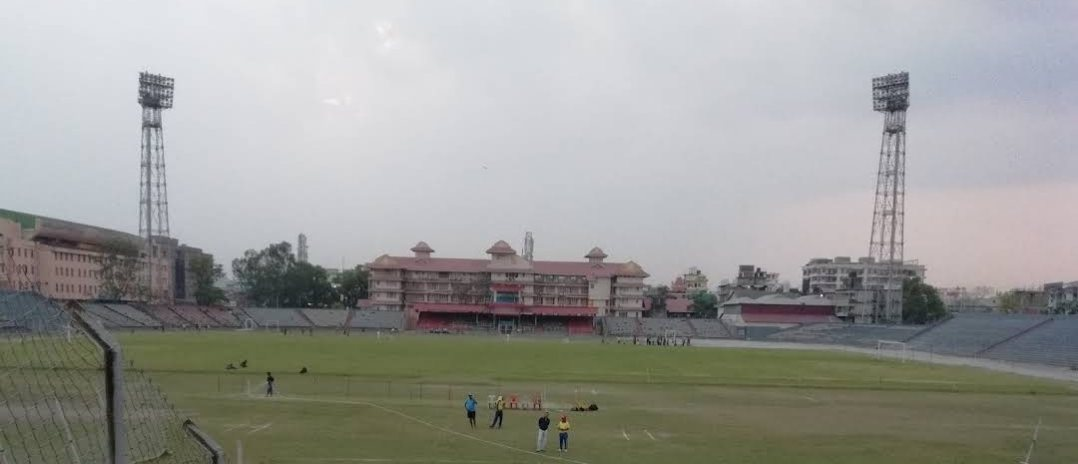
Nehru Stadium, Guwahati in the evening

FC Green Valley plays all its home matches at the Nehru Stadium in Guwahati, which has a capacity of 25,000 spectators.

== Players ==
As of 20 April 2025

Note: Flags indicate national team as defined under FIFA eligibility rules; some limited exceptions apply. Players may hold more than one non-FIFA nationality.

No.	Pos.	Nation	Player
1	GK	IND	Birkhang Daimary
6	FW	IND	Debjit Basak
9	FW	IND	Dipu Mirdha
12	DF	IND	Pabitra Bora
19	MF	IND	Ajan Swargiary
20	DF	IND	Manabir Basumatsry
22	FW	IND	Dipankar Das
23	MF	IND	Lukesh Kuli
27	MF	IND	Mintu Mech
28	DF	IND	Koustuvmali Saikia

No.	Pos.	Nation	Player
14	DF	IND	Urjay Brahma
7	DF	IND	Biplab Nayak
26	FW	IND	Bipin Narzary
10	FW	IND	Baoringdao Bodo
16	FW	IND	Somnath Sarkar
31	GK	IND	Pranab Deka
17	MF	IND	Siddar Chettri
4	FW	IND	Lakshyajyoti Das
24	DF	IND	Chandan Yadav
24	DF	IND	Rohit Saibya
21	GK	IND	Apurba Dutta

== Honours ==
=== League ===
- Assam State Premier League
  - Runners-up (3): 2012–13, 2013–14, 2015

=== Cup ===
- Bordoloi Trophy
  - Runners-up: (1): 2014
- NN Bhattacharya Knock-Out Football Tournament
  - Champions (1): 2022
- Amba Medhi Football Tournament
  - Runners-up (1): 2007

== See also ==
- List of football clubs in Assam
- Assam State Premier League
- Assam Football Association
