= MP United FC (India) =

Former Indian association football club based in Indore

MP United
- Full name: Madhya Pradesh United Football Club
- Nickname(s): MP, United
- Founded: 2013; 12 years ago
- Ground: Indore Football Field
- Capacity: 5,000
- Owner: MP United Football Club Pvt. Ltd
- League: I-League 2nd Division
- 2014: Group stage

Madhya Pradesh United Football Club (simply known as MPUFC) was an Indian football club from Indore, Madhya Pradesh. MPUFC was the first football club from the state to play in a national level league.

== History ==
MP United FC was established in 2013 for improvement of football in the Central India. As Madhya Pradesh was lacking a professional team, MP United was established in Indore.
