= Guwahati FC =

Indian association football club based in Guwahati

Guwahati
- Full name: Guwahati Football Club
- Founded: December 2014; 12 years ago
- Ground: Nehru Stadium, Guwahati; Northeast Frontier Railway Stadium
- Capacity: 15,000; 10,000
- Owner: Sanjive Narain
Home colours	Away colours

Guwahati Football Club is an Indian professional football club based in Guwahati, Assam, that competed in the I-League 2 and the Assam State Premier League. The team was launched in December 2014 to promote Assamese football.

== History ==
After breaking away from his stake in the Indian Super League club NorthEast United, Sanjive Narain co-founded Guwahati Football Club in December 2014. In May 2015, Spanish coach, Anxo Valcarcel signed as the teams' first head coach. Upon launching the team, Narain said that the main goal of the team was not earn promotion to the I-League and thus give Assam a club in India's top football competition. The team is jointly owned by Sanjive Naraine, Jayanta Barua, Bipul Saikia, Casper Investment Private Limited, Dadul Chodhury, Kamal Chandra Das and Pulak Goswami.

The team played their first competition in May 2015 when they participated in the revamped Assam State Premier League. Their first match was against Tezpur United FC, ending 0–0. Guwahati barely qualified for the finals as they ended regular season campaign on fourth place in Lower Assam zone. They were knocked-out in the first-round of the finals by Baarhoongkha on away goals after a 3–3 draw. On 1 October 2015, it was confirmed that Guwahati would participate in the I-League 2nd Division. Guwahati FC started off with their I-league 2 campaign on 14 November in Barasat Stadium against Mohammedan Sporting. Their group also included Gangtok Himalayan SC, NEROCA FC and Fateh Hyderabad AFC. Guwahati FC finished 4th and failed to qualify for the next round. They have not participated in the following domestic season.

== Partnership ==
In 2015, Guwahati FC tied up with Delhi-based Anglian Management Group and Brazil's Clube Atlético Paranaense to set up the first international football Academy in North-East India based out of Guwahati. The Academy planned to train a hundred elite youth footballers from various age groups each of the next three years as well as run numerous programmes throughout the year aimed at attracting many more youth to the sport. Training would be done under the supervision of CAP's Brazilian coaches who, in addition to making regular visits to Guwahati, would also train Guwahati FC coaches at the CAP-owned facilities in Curitiba, Brazil.

Luiz Greco, the director of Clube Atlético Paranaense said: “From the beginning of our tie-up with Anglian, we have been exposed to the huge potential of opportunities that Indian football has to offer. We appreciate them putting their trust in us to involve us in this project and we have been very impressed with the vision set forth by the management of Guwahati FC from the outset.”

== Affiliated clubs ==
The following club was affiliated with Guwahati FC:

- (Brazil) Clube Atlético Paranaense (2015—2017)

== Kit manufacturers and shirt sponsors ==
Period	Kit manufacturer	Shirt sponsor	Remarks
2015	Vamos	None	For Assam State Premier League
2015	Nivia	Tata Motors	For I-League 2nd Division

== See also ==
- Assam Football Association
- Gauhati Town Club
- List of football clubs in Assam
