= Guru Nanak Stadium =

Football stadium in Ludhiana, India

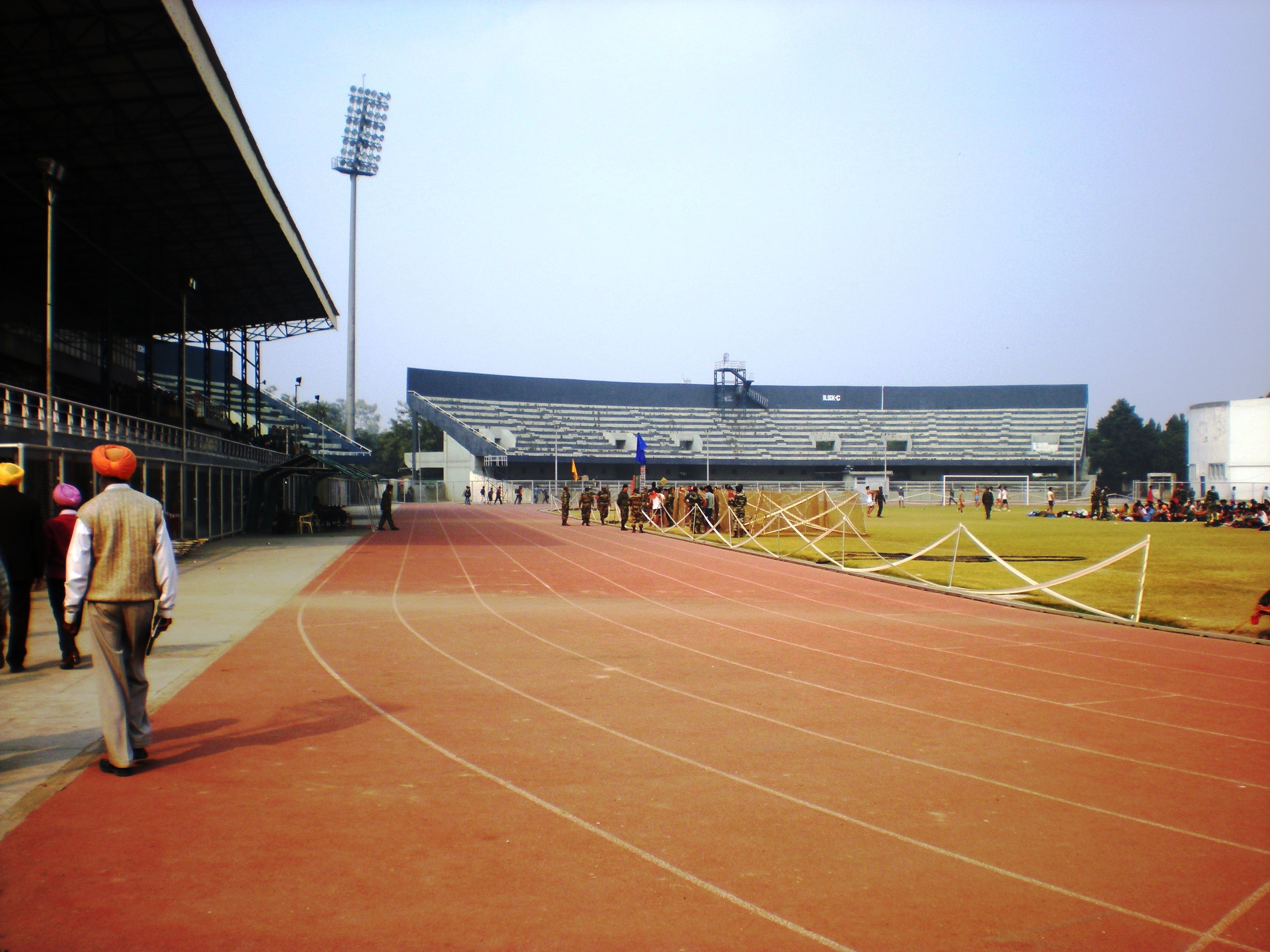
- Interactive map of Guru Nanak Stadium
- Address: Ludhiana; India
- Location: Ludhiana, Punjab
- Owner: Punjab FC
- Capacity: 30,000
- Surface: Bermuda grass
- Scoreboard: Yes

Construction
- Renovated: 2025

Tenants
- Punjab FC, Punjab FC Youth; Minerva Academy FC, JCT FC (formerly)

Guru Nanak Stadium is a multi-purpose stadium in Ludhiana, India. It hosts football matches and athletic competitions. It is used as one of the home grounds of the Indian Super League team Punjab FC. With seating capacity of 30,000 spectators.

The adjacent indoor stadium has been used for the National Basketball Championship.

== Other events ==
It had the privilege of hosting 31st National Games in 2001.

=== Kabaddi ===
Stadium has hosted some domestic kabaddi matches. It also hosted matches of Kabaddi World Cup.

Date	Time	Team #1	Result	Team #2	Round	category
12 April 2010	17:30	Canada	66–22	Italy	Third-place playoff	Men
12 April 2010	19:30	India	58–24	Pakistan	Final	Men
20 November 2011	17:15	Pakistan	60–22	Italy	Third-place playoff	Men
20 November 2011	19:15	India	44–17	England	Final	Women
20 November 2011	22:15	India	59–25	Canada	Final	Men
15 December 2012	20:00	India	72–12	Malaysia	Final	Women
15 December 2012	21:00	India	59–25	Pakistan	Final	Men
14 December 2013	22:00	India	48–39	Pakistan	Final	Men

== See also ==
- Tau Devi Lal Athletic Stadium (Panchkula)
