= Nehru Stadium, Guwahati =

Multi purpose stadium

Nehru Stadium
- RG Baruah Sports Complex
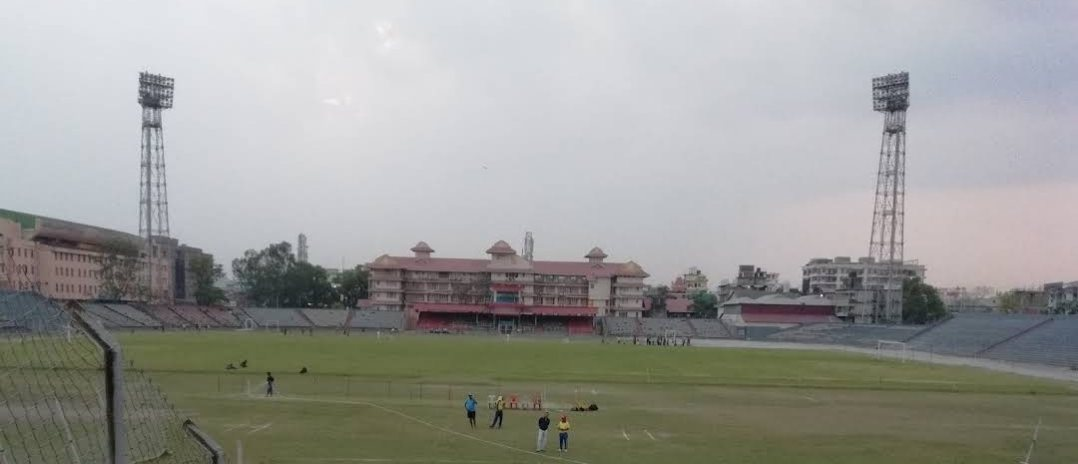
- View of Nehru Stadium
- Interactive map of Nehru Stadium
- Address: India
- Location: R.G. Baruah Sports Complex, Guwahati, Assam, India
- Coordinates: 26°10′50″N 91°45′28.8″E
- Owner: Radha Govinda Baruah (1962); Board of Sports of Assam (since 1962)
- Operator: Board of Sports of Assam, Government of Assam
- Capacity: 25,000
- Surface: Grass

Construction
- Opened: 1962; 64 years ago

Tenants
- Assam cricket team Assam football team Assam women's football team Assam State Premier League; GSA Football leagues

Ground information
- End names
- Pavilion End; Railway End
- First men's ODI: 17 December 1983: India v West Indies
- Last men's ODI: 28 November 2010: India v New Zealand
- First women's ODI: 14 November 1995: India v England
- Last women's ODI: 4 December 2005: India v England
- As of 9 December 2019; Source: ESPNcricinfo

Nehru Stadium, also known as the RG Baruah Sports Complex, is a multi-purpose stadium in Guwahati, Assam, India. In 1962, Radha Govinda Baruah supervised and built the stadium. He named it after the first prime minister of India Jawaharlal Nehru. It can host 25,000 spectators. The stadium is operated by the Board of Sports of Assam, Government of Assam. It has been mainly used for football and cricket.

Nehru Stadium has hosted 13 One Day Internationals matches and many matches of domestic cricket tournaments including Ranji Trophy, Duleep Trophy and Deodhar Trophy. In football, it hosts the prestigious Bordoloi Trophy and all three divisions of GSA Football League regularly. The stadium has also hosted the Santosh Trophy and Federation Cup, two top level domestic football tournaments of India.

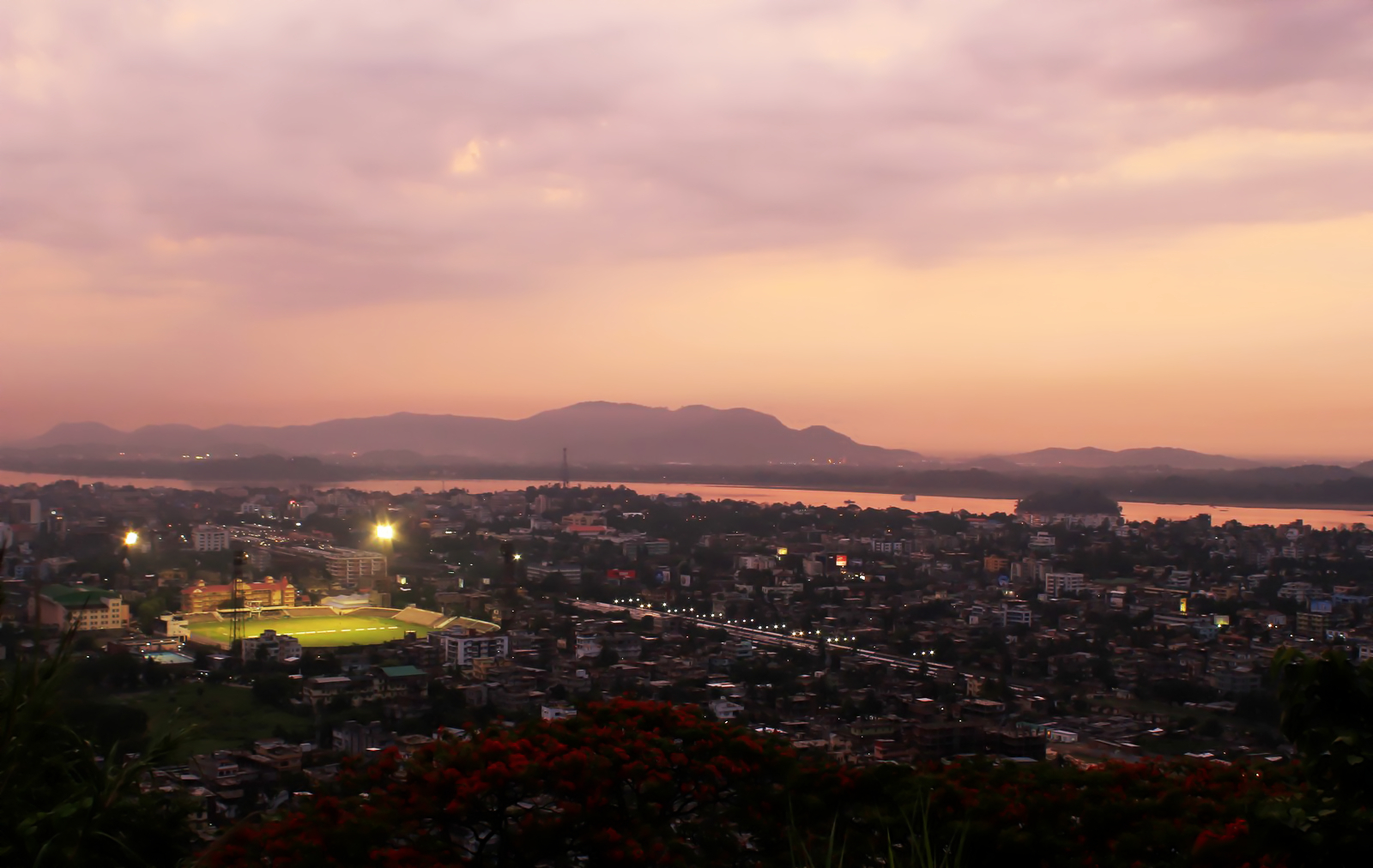
Nehru Stadium, Guwahati in the evening

== Redevelopment ==
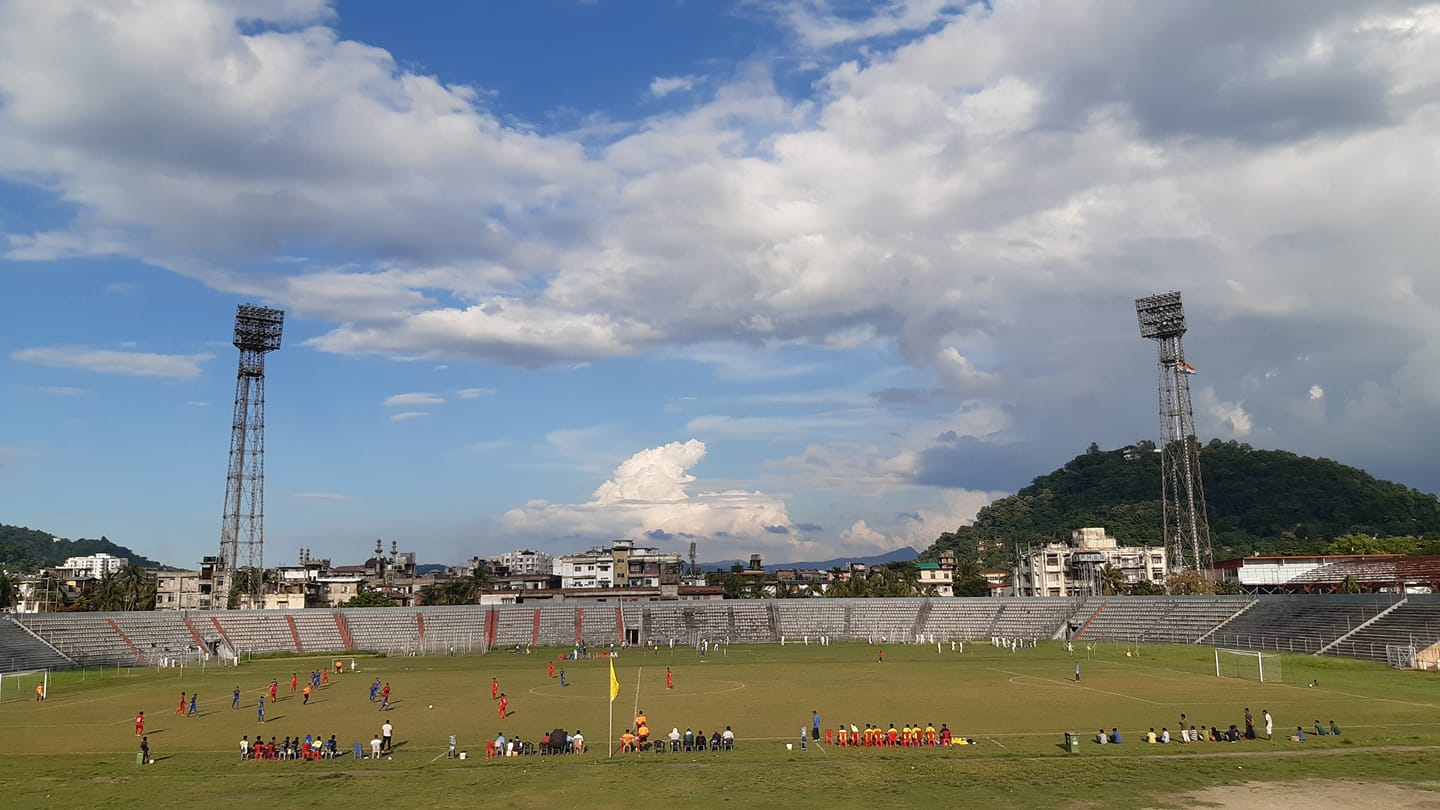
A football match of Guwahati Sports Association underway at the Nehru Stadium.

On 13 November 2025, Assam Cabinet approved ₹765 crore redevelopment of Nehru Stadium. The redevelopment will transform the existing facility into a world-class football stadium with a seating capacity of 25,000, making it into a FIFA Category 2 stadium. The tender to build the new stadium was won by Larsen & Tourbo. The new stadium will also have state-of-the-art training and competition facilities for football, swimming, badminton, table tennis and various other indoor and outdoor sports.

== All records and statistics ==
Type	Team 1	Opposition team	Date
First ODI	India	West Indies	17 Dec 1983
Last ODI	India	New Zealand	28 Nov 2010

Highest totals
Team 1	Opposition team	Date	Score	Overs
India	Zimbabwe	19 March 2002	333/6	50
West Indies	New Zealand	1 Nov 1994	306/6	50

Lowest totals
Team 1	Opposition team	Date	Score	Overs
India	West Indies	23 Dec 1987	135	41.3
Sri Lanka	South Africa	19 Nov 1993	136	40.1

Leading run scorers are Yuvraj Singh- 181 runs, Michael Bevan- 163 runs and Dinesh Mongia- 159 runs. Leading wicket takers are Ravi Shastri and Harbhajan Singh- 7 wickets.

== List of centuries ==
=== Key ===
- * denotes that the batsman was not out.
- Inns. denotes the number of the innings in the match.
- Balls denotes the number of balls faced in an innings.
- NR denotes that the number of balls was not recorded.
- Parentheses next to the player's score denotes his century number at Edgbaston.
- The column title Date refers to the date the match started.
- The column title Result refers to the player's team result

=== Centuries in One Day Internationals ===
No.	Score	Player	Team	Balls	Inns.	Opposing team	Date	Result
1	111	Carl Hooper	West Indies	114	1	New Zealand	1 November 1994	Won
2	159*	Dinesh Mongia	India	147	1	Zimbabwe	19 March 2002	Won
3	105	Virat Kohli	India	104	1	New Zealand	28 November 2010	Won

== List of five wicket hauls ==
=== Key ===
Symbol	Meaning
†	The bowler was man of the match
‡	10 or more wickets taken in the match
§	One of two five-wicket hauls by the bowler in the match
Date	Day the Test started or ODI was held
Inn	Innings in which five-wicket haul was taken
Overs	Number of overs bowled.
Runs	Number of runs conceded
Wkts	Number of wickets taken
Econ	Runs conceded per over
Batsmen	Batsmen whose wickets were taken
Drawn	The match was drawn.

=== Five Wicket Hauls ===
No.	Bowler	Date	Team	Opposing team	Inn	Overs	Runs	Wkts	Econ	Batsmen	Result
1	Robin Singh (cricketer)	22 December 1997	India	Sri Lanka	1	5	22	5	4.4	Romesh Kaluwitharana; Kumar Dharmasena; Roshan Mahanama; Upul Chandana; Muttiah Muralitharan	Won
2	Doug Bollinger	8 November 2009	Australia	India	1	10	35	5	3.5	Sachin Tendulkar; Yuvraj Singh; MS Dhoni; Harbhajan Singh; Ravindra Jadeja	Won

== See also ==
- Assam Cricket Association Stadium, Guwahati
- Indira Gandhi Athletic Stadium
