= 2012 Durand Cup final =

Final of the 125th edition of the Durand Cup

- Event: 2012 Durand Cup
Air India	Dodsal
0	0
- Air India won 3–2 on penalties
- Date: 1 September 2012
- Venue: Ambedkar Stadium, Delhi
- Attendance: 10,000

The 2012 Durand Cup final was a football match between Air India and Dodsal on 1 September 2012 at Ambedkar Stadium, Delhi. It was the final match of the 2012 Durand Cup, the 125th season of the Durand Cup, a football competition for the 12 teams in the I-League and the Indian football system. Air India were appearing in their first final, as where Dodsal.

Air India and Dodsal played out to a goalless 90 minutes at first. The score remained the same through extra time. With the score 0–0 after extra time, the match went to penalties as neither side were able to score a first goal. Despite missing two penalties, Air India won the shootout 3–2 to win the Durand Cup for first time in their history.

== Route to the final ==
=== Air India ===
Round	Opponents	Score
GS	Delhi United	3–0
GS	Pailan Arrows	1–1
SF	SESA Football Academy	2–2 (7–6 pen)

Air India entered the Durand Cup at the group stage and was paired in Group A with Delhi United and Pailan Arrows. They played their first match on 26 August 2012 against Delhi United in which Air India won 3–0 with goals from Pradeep Mohanraj, Ong Lepcha, and Neil Gaikwad. Then on 28 August 2012 the club played their second match of the tournament against Pailan Arrows in which they drew 1–1 with Souvik Chakraborty scoring the lone goal for Air India. That victory managed to push Air India through to the semi-finals in which they faced SESA Football Academy on 30 August 2012. Air India won the match on penalties 7–6 to move on to the final of the Durand Cup after extra time finished at 2–2.

=== Dodsal ===
Round	Opponents	Score
GS	Army Red	3–0
GS	Punjab Police	6–0
SF	Assam Rifles	1–1 (6–5 pen)

Dodsal also entered the Durand Cup via Group Stage. They won their first match against Army Red 3–0 before defeating Punjab Police 6–0 to qualify for the semi-finals. In the semi-final Dodsal played against Assam Rifles on 30 August 2012, beating them 6–5 on penalties to qualify for the final.

== Match ==
1 September 2012
18:30 IST

Air India	0 – 0 (a.e.t.)	(India) Dodsal
	Report
Penalties
Mohanraj (penalty scored); Shetty (penalty scored); Meher (penalty missed); Chaudhari (penalty missed); R. Singh (penalty scored)	3–2	(penalty missed) Pradeep; (penalty scored) Kumar; (penalty scored) Diakhate; (penalty missed) Ghosh; (penalty missed) Rafi

Ambedkar Stadium, Delhi
Attendance: 10,000

Air India	Dodsal

GK	(India) Harshad Meher
DF	(India) Gagandeep Singh
DF	(India) Ramandeep Singh
DF	(India) Baldeep Singh
MF	(India) Micky Fernandes
MF	(India) Souvik Chakraborty
MF	(India) Pratik Chaudhari
MF	(India) Ong Lepcha
FW	(India) Hringsolal Thomte
FW	(India) Pradeep Mohanraj
FW	(India) Neil Gaikwad
Substitutes:
FW	(India) Abhishek Ambedkar
Manager:
(India) Godfrey Pereira

GK
DF
DF
DF
DF
MF
MF
MF
MF
FW
FW
Substitutes:
DF
Manager:
(India) Bimal Ghosh

(India) Arup Debnath
(India) Vinay Kumar
(India) Henry Gangte	(substituted off) 18'
(India) Rabindra Ghosh
(India) Kali Alaudeen	Sent off (straight red)
(India) Loukik Jadhav
(India) Thoi Singh
(India) Sunil Kumar
(India) Paresh Shivalkar
(India) Mohammed Rafi
(Senegal) Demba Diakhaté
(India) Pappachen Pradeep	(substituted on) 18'
