= 2012 Durand Cup quarter-finals =

The group stage featured 12 teams: the 8 automatic qualifiers and the 4 winners of the preliminary stage.

The teams are drawn into four groups of three, and play each once. The matchdays were between 23 and 28 August.

The top teams in each group advanced to the semi-finals.

== Group A ==
Team	Pld	W	D	L	GF	GA	GD	Pts
Air India	2	1	1	0	4	1	+3	4
Pailan Arrows	2	0	2	0	3	3	0	2
Delhi United	2	0	1	1	2	5	−3	1

25 August 2012
9:00 IST

Delhi United	2–2	Pailan Arrows
Okwudiu 24', 45'	Report	Narzary; Singh

Ambedkar Stadium, New Delhi

26 August 2012
16:00 IST

Delhi United	0–3	Air India
	Report	Mohanraj 18'; Lepcha 67'; Gaikwad 88'

Ambedkar Stadium, New Delhi

28 August 2012
14:00 IST

Pailan Arrows	1–1	Air India
Bag 20'	Report	Chakraborty 17'

Ambedkar Stadium, New Delhi

== Group B ==
Team	Pld	W	D	L	GF	GA	GD	Pts
Assam Rifles	2	1	1	0	4	3	+1	4
Sporting Goa	2	1	0	1	5	4	+1	3
ONGC	2	0	1	1	2	4	−2	1

24 August 2012
14:00 IST

Sporting Goa	2–3	Assam Rifles
Bertrand 5'; Nnanna 75'	Report	Kamei 41'; Jidung 43'; Singh 69'

Ambedkar Stadium, New Delhi

26 August 2012
14:00 IST

ONGC	1–1	Assam Rifles
Patil 7'	Report	Kamei 90+5'

Ambedkar Stadium, New Delhi

28 August 2012
16:00 IST

Sporting Goa	3–1	ONGC
Fernandes 43'; Nnanna 67'; Shirodkar 90+2'	Report	Dhanesh MC 42'

Ambedkar Stadium, New Delhi

== Group C ==
Team	Pld	W	D	L	GF	GA	GD	Pts
SESA Football Academy	2	1	1	0	4	3	+1	4
Pune	2	0	2	0	1	1	0	2
Central Reserve Police	2	0	1	1	2	3	−1	1

23 August 2012
17:00 IST

Pune	0–0	Central Reserve Police
	Report

Ambedkar Stadium, New Delhi

25 August 2012
16:00 IST

SESA Football Academy	3–2	Central Reserve Police
Kadam 62'; Colaco 72'; Andrew 90+5'	Report	Soumerjit 82'; Sugesh 90+3'

Ambedkar Stadium, New Delhi

27 August 2012
14:00 IST

SESA Football Academy	1–1	Pune
Chukwuma 90+4'	Report	Lalpekhlua 90+1'

Ambedkar Stadium, New Delhi

== Group D ==
Team	Pld	W	D	L	GF	GA	GD	Pts
Dodsal	2	2	0	0	9	0	+9	6
Army Red	2	1	0	1	1	3	−2	3
FC Punjab Police	2	0	0	2	0	7	−7	0

23 August 2012
19:45 IST

FC Punjab Police	0–1	Army Red
		Singh 18'

Ambedkar Stadium, New Delhi

25 August 2012
14:00 IST

Army Red	0–3	Dodsal
		Kumar 66'; Pradeep 85'; Diakhaté 90+1'

Ambedkar Stadium, New Delhi

27 August 2012
16:00 IST

FC Punjab Police	0–6	Dodsal
	Report	Rafi 1', 63'; Singh 5', 76'; Pradeep 66'; Zeeshan 78'

Ambedkar Stadium, New Delhi
