= 2012–13 Pailan Arrows season =

Indian football club season

Pailan Arrows
2012–13 season
- Manager: Arthur Papas
- I-League: 12th
- Federation Cup: Group Stage
- Durand Cup: Group Stage
- Top goalscorer: League: 4 goals Holicharan Narzary; Milan Singh; All: 7 goals Holicharan Narzary
Home colours	Away colours

The 2012–13 Pailan Arrows season was the club's third season since their formation in 2010 and their second under the name Pailan Arrows. They finished 12th in the I-League.

== Background ==
The club changed their name to Pailan Arrows on 15 June 2011 after the All India Football Federation reached an agreement with Pailan Group to sponsor the team. With the deal Pailan Arrows was also relocated to Kolkata and the Salt Lake Stadium. Then on 13 August 2012 head coach Desmond Bulpin was sacked by the club due to his "style of football" while former India national football team coach Sukhwinder Singh was signed to take over the club. The club also lost many of the stars of the previous season like Lalrindika Ralte, Jeje Lalpekhlua (top scorer for Pailan and among Indians in 2010–11), Manandeep Singh and Gurpreet Singh Sandhu. The club again participated in the Federation Cup in 2011 where Pailan won two matches but lost one which meant that they would finish 2nd behind Salgaocar and thus meant Pailan were knocked out in the group stage again. Pailan Arrows then began their 2011–12 I-League campaign against Mohun Bagan at the Salt Lake Stadium on 23 October 2012 in which they lost 1–3 after Lalrozama Fanai gave them the early lead. On 7 February 2012 Sukhwinder Singh resigned as coach of Pailan Arrows for personal reasons, at this point also Pailan had not won a single match in I-League and had only managed eight draws in 17 matches. Assistant coach Sujit Chakravarty took over the reins as head coach for the remainder of the season. Towards the end of the season Pailan managed to win two matches, one against Chirag United Club Kerala and another against HAL to finished the season in 13th place out of 14 teams but since they are a developmental team, Pailan were not relegated.

== Transfers ==
=== In ===
#	Position	Player	Transferred from	Fee	Date	Ref
	DF	(India) Jayabrata Dhar	(India) Tata FA	Free	19 June 2012	
	FW	(India) Pankaj Sona	(India) Tata FA	Free	19 June 2012	
	MF	(India) Siam Hanghal	(India) Tata FA	Free	19 June 2012	
	MF	(India) Ravinder Singh	(India) Tata FA	Free	19 June 2012	
	DF	(India) Chingkhei Yumnam	(India) Tata FA	Free	19 June 2012	
	DF	(India) Irfan Khan	(India) Tata FA	Free	19 June 2012	
	MF	(India) Yaikhom Meitei	(India) Tata FA	Free	19 June 2012	
	MF	(India) Simranjit Singh	(India) Tata FA	Free	19 June 2012	
	MF	(India) Shaiju Mon	(India) Chirag United Kerala	Free	6 July 2012	
	MF	(India) Deepak Prakash	(India) Hindustan Aeronautics Limited	Free	13 August 2012	
	MF	(India) Dhanpal Ganeshan	(India) Pune	Free	18 August 2012	
	DF	(India) Narayan Das	(India) Tata FA	Free	24 October 2012	

=== Out ===
#	Position	Player	Transferred to	Fee	Date	Ref
	DF	(India) Rajib Ghosh	(India) Mohun Bagan	Free	14 May 2012	
	FW	(India) Chinadorai Sabeeth	(India) Mohun Bagan	Free	16 May 2012	
	GK	(India) Naveen Kumar	(India) Mohun Bagan	Free	16 May 2012	
	MF	(India) Loukik Jadhav	(India) Mumbai Tigers	Free	27 May 2012	
	DF	(India) Gurtej Singh	(India) Churchill Brothers	Free	31 May 2012	
	MF	(India) Bikramjit Singh	(India) Churchill Brothers	Free	31 May 2012	
	MF	(India) Jibon Singh	(India) Shillong Lajong	Free	8 June 2012	
	MF	(India) Bijendra Rai	(India) Mohun Bagan	Free	8 July 2012	
	FW	(India) Ajay Singh	(India) Churchill Brothers	Free	13 July 2012	

== Durand Cup ==
Pailan Arrows entered the Durand Cup in 2012 in the group stage and were placed in Group A with Air India and Delhi United. Pailan started the tournament with a 2–2 draw against Delhi United with Holicharan Narzary and Milan Singh scoring for Pailan at the Ambedkar Stadium. Pailan then bowed out of the tournament after drawing 1–1 with Air India. Pailan ended with two points while Air India had 4 points.

25 August 2012 Group stage	Pailan Arrows	2–2	Delhi United	Delhi
9:00 IST	Narzary; Singh	Report	Okwudiu 24', 45'	Stadium: Ambedkar Stadium

28 August 2012 Group stage	Pailan Arrows	1–1	Air India	Delhi
14:00 IST	Bag 20'	Report	Chakraborty 17'	Stadium: Ambedkar Stadium

== Federation Cup ==
As with the Durand Cup Pailan entered the Federation Cup in the group stage and were placed in Group A with 2011–12 I-League champions Dempo, along with Mumbai, and Shillong Lajong. All their group matches would be played at the JRD Tata Sports Complex in Jamshedpur, Orissa. In their first match Pailan faced off against Dempo at the JRD Tata Sports Complex in which the club drew the match 1–1 against the reigning league champions with Holicharan Narzary giving the club the lead in the 52nd minute before Clifford Miranda tied it up eight minutes later. In Pailan Arrow's next match two days later on 21 September 2012 the club took on Mumbai F.C. at the Keenan Stadium; the club once again drew with their opponents but this time by a score of 2–2 with Dhanpal Ganeshan and Deepak Devrani scoring in the 45th and 78th minutes of the match while David Opara scored twice for the opposition to deny Pailan Arrows the win. The club then finished their Federation Cup campaign on a high note with a victory over Shillong Lajong F.C. on 23 September 2012 at the Keenan Stadium by a score of 2–1 with Holicharan Narzary and Prabir Das scoring for Pailan Arrows in the 17th and 69th minutes of the match while Ebi Sukore scored in the 21st minute for the opposition. The club, despite not losing a match, however were knocked-out at the group stage of the Federation Cup as Dempo had won one more match than Pailan and thus had more points.

19 September 2012 Group Stage	Dempo	1–1	Pailan Arrows	Jamshedpur, Orissa
15:00 IST	Miranda 60'	Report	Narzary 52'	Stadium: JRD Tata Sports Complex

21 September 2012 Group Stage	Pailan Arrows	2–2	Mumbai	Jamshedpur, Orissa
15:00 IST	Ganeshan 45'; Devrani 78'	Report	Opara 12', 62'	Stadium: Keenan Stadium

23 September 2012 Group Stage	Pailan Arrows	2–1	Shillong Lajong	Jamshedpur, Orissa
15:00 IST	Narzary 17'; Das 69'	Report	Sukore 21'	Stadium: Keenan Stadium

== I-League ==
Pailan Arrows began their 2012–13 I-League campaign in style on 6 October 2012 with a victory over Mumbai F.C. at the Salt Lake Stadium in Kolkata, West Bengal with the Arrows winning 3–2 over the Maharashtra club with Holicharan Narzary scoring a brace in the 34th and 76th minute with Milan Singh scoring in between Narzary's goal with a penalty-kick goal in the 54th minute; David Opara and James Singh scored the two goals for Mumbai in the 39th and 45th minutes respectively. Pailan Arrows then won their second match of the season and second match of the season on 11 October 2012 against Air India FC at the Salt Lake Stadium with Holicharan Narzary scoring his third goal in two games in the 41st minute before Henry Ezeh equalized for Air India in the 67th minute but just two minutes later Milan Singh converted his second penalty-kick of the season to win Pailan Arrows the match 2–1. Pailan Arrows then ended their first month of the season and the month of October undefeated after they drew with Salgaocar F.C. at the Fatorda Stadium in Margao, Goa 0–0 on 28 October 2012.

Pailan Arrows began the month of November on an ordinary note with a draw against United Sikkim F.C. at the Paljor Stadium in the Sikkimese capital of Gangtok on 4 November 2012 with the score ending up as 0–0. The club then however suffered a set-back when they lost to Pune F.C. at home on 9 November 2012 with Karma Tsewang and Subhash Singh scoring in the 11th and 46th minutes of the game for Pune to help Pailan suffer their first defeat of the season. Pailan then suffered yet another set-back when they lost their second game on the trott when they lost to Prayag United on 18 November 2012 with C.K. Vineeth and Lalkamal Bhowmick ensuring that Pailan would not win the match while Narayan Das scored his first goal of his career in the 84th minute which was actually the equalizer for Pailan Arrows before Bhowmick finished the game off in the 88th minute. Pailan however did make a comeback in their next match on 23 November 2012 against Sporting Clube de Goa at the Fatorda Stadium when they won 1–0 over the Goan club with Narayan Das being the goalscorer again for Pailan Arrows in the 54th minute. Pailan though, however, failed to end the month of November on a bright note as the fell to their third loss of the month in five games on 28 November 2012 against Shillong Lajong F.C. by a score of 3–1 at the Nehru Stadium in Shillong with Tirthankar Sarkar being the lone scorer for Pailan in the 67th minute after Lajong scored through Sushil Kumar Singh in the 3rd and 49th minutes and Gbeneme Friday in the 52nd minute.

Despite the rough month of November Pailan Arrows began the month of December with a bang on 1 December 2012 with a 4–1 victory over ONGC F.C. at the Salt Lake Stadium with Deepak Devrani scoring his first goal of his career for Pailan in the 10th minute before ONGC equalized through Liberian Eric Brown in the 21st minute but Holicharan Narzary scored his fourth league goal of the season in the 25th minute to give Pailan the lead before Milan Singh scored in the 57th minute from the penalty spot and Alwyn George scored his first goal of the season in the 82nd minute to confirm Pailan's mega victory. There after however Pailan were brought back down to earth in their next match against Churchill Brothers S.C. on 10 December 2012 at the Salt Lake Stadium when they lost 3–0 with Bineesh Balan and Beto providing the goals for Churchill Brothers. Pailan then had 12 days to prepare for their next match against Dempo S.C. as their match against Mohun Bagan A.C. for 15 December 2012 was postponed; when Pailan played Dempo on 22 December 2012 at the Salt Lake Stadium they once again saw themselves lose with Joaquim Abranches scoring both the goals for Dempo in the 10th and 59th minutes of the match while Milan Singh scored the equalizer for Pailan in between from the penalty spot in the 45th minute before halftime. Pailan Arrows however then ended the month of December and the year 2012 with their third defeat in a row when they lost 3–0 to East Bengal at the Kalyani Stadium on 30 December 2012 with Robin Singh and Sanju Pradhan doing the damage against the Pailan Arrows.

The club then failed to begin the year 2013 on a good start when they fell to ONGC, a club they had beaten 4–1 only a month earlier, by a score of 3–0 with Pritam Kotal scoring an own goal for Pailan in the 6th minute before goals from Eric Brown and Lalnun Puia scoring the other two goals for ONGC in the 30th and 67th minutes of the match. The club then succumbed to their fifth defeat of the season on 9 January 2013 against Churchill Brothers at the Duler Stadium in which the club lost 3–1 due to a double by Gabon international striker Henry Antchouet and a goal by Israil Gurung all within five minutes from the 60th to the 65th minutes of the match; Pailan did have the lead though when Prathamesh Maulingkar put Arrows in the lead in the 56th minute. Despite their fifth loss of the season though, Pailan Arrows still managed to break that run in the very next match against Air India on 12 January 2013 at the Balewadi Sports Complex in which Pailan Arrows drew the match 1–1 with Rajinder Kumar giving Arrows the equalizer they needed right before halftime, after Henry Ezeh put Air India in the lead in the 37th minute.

6 October 2012 Round 1	Pailan Arrows	3–2	Mumbai	Kolkata, West Bengal
14:30 IST	Narzary 36', 76'; M. Singh 54' (pen.)	Report	Opara 39'; J. Singh 45'	Stadium: Salt Lake Stadium

11 October 2012 Round 2	Pailan Arrows	2–1	Air India	Kolkata, West Bengal
14:30 IST	Narzary 41'; Singh 69' (pen.)	Report	Ezeh 67'	Stadium: Salt Lake Stadium; Referee: PH Lanthoiba

28 October 2012 Round 3	Salgaocar	0–0	Pailan Arrows	Margao, Goa
17:30 IST		Report		Stadium: Fatorda Stadium

4 November 2012 Round 4	United Sikkim	0–0	Pailan Arrows	Gangtok, Sikkim
14:00 IST		Report		Stadium: Paljor Stadium; Referee: C.R. Srikrishna (Tamil Nadu)

9 November 2012 Round 5	Pailan Arrows	0–2	Pune	Kolkata, West Bengal
14:00 IST		Report	Tsewang 11'; Singh 46'	Stadium: Salt Lake Stadium; Referee: R. Singh

18 November 2012 Round 6	Pailan Arrows	1–2	Prayag United	Kolkata, West Bengal
14:00 IST	Das 84'	Report	Vineeth 12'; Bhowmick 88'	Stadium: Salt Lake Stadium; Referee: D. Naik

23 November 2012 Round 7	Sporting Goa	0–1	Pailan Arrows	Margao, Goa
17:30 IST		Report	Das 54'	Stadium: Fatorda Stadium; Referee: P. Banerji

28 November 2012 Round 8	Shillong Lajong	3–1	Pailan Arrows	Shillong, Meghalaya
14:00 IST	Singh 3', 49'; Friday 52'	Report	Sarkar 67'	Stadium: Nehru Stadium; Referee: P. Singh

1 December 2012 Round 9	Pailan Arrows	4–1	ONGC	Kolkata, West Bengal
14:00 IST	Devrani 10'; Narzary 25'; Singh 57' (pen.); Alwyn 82'	Report	Brown 21'	Stadium: Salt Lake Stadium; Referee: A. Pillai

10 December 2012 Round 10	Pailan Arrows	0–3	Churchill Brothers	Kolkata, West Bengal
14:00 IST		Report	Balan 3'; Beto 49', 58'	Stadium: Salt Lake Stadium; Referee: R. Shah

15 December 2012 Round 11	Mohun Bagan	Cancelled	Pailan Arrows	Kolkata, West Bengal
				Stadium: Salt Lake Stadium

22 December 2012 Round 12	Pailan Arrows	1–2	Dempo	Kolkata, West Bengal
14:00 IST	Singh 45' (pen.)	Report	Abranches 10', 59'	Stadium: Salt Lake Stadium; Referee: A. Pillai

30 December 2012 Round 13	East Bengal	3–0	Pailan Arrows	Kalyani, West Bengal
14:00 IST	Singh 44'; Pradhan 55', 86'	Report		Stadium: Kalyani Stadium; Referee: R. Dsa

5 January 2013 Round 14	ONGC	3–0	Pailan Arrows	Delhi
14:00 IST	Kotal 67' (o.g.); Brown 30'; Puia 67'	Report		Stadium: Ambedkar Stadium; Referee: V. Chauhan

9 January 2013 Round 15	Churchill Brothers	3–1	Pailan Arrows	Mapusa, Goa
15:30 IST	Antchouet 60', 63'; Gurung 65'	Report	Maulingkar 56'	Stadium: Duler Stadium; Referee: A. Shekar

12 January 2013 Round 16	Air India	1–1	Pailan Arrows	Pune, Maharashtra
19:00 IST	Ezeh 37'	Report	Kumar 45+2'	Stadium: Balewadi Sports Complex; Referee: T. Nagvenkar

20 January 2013 Round 17	Pailan Arrows	1–0	Shillong Lajong	Kolkata, West Bengal
14:00 IST	Das 39'	Report		Stadium: Salt Lake Stadium; Referee: D. Naik

=== Results summary ===
Overall								Home						Away					
Pld	W	D	L	GF	GA	GD	Pts	W	D	L	GF	GA	GD	W	D	L	GF	GA	GD
16	5	3	8	16	26	−10	18	4	0	4	12	13	−1	1	3	4	4	13	−9

Last updated: 20 January 2013.
Source: Pailan Arrows results

=== Position by round ===
Round	1	2	3	4	5	6	7	8	9	10	11	12	13	14	15	16	17	18	19	20	21	22	23	24	25	26
Result	W	W	D	D	L	L	W	L	W	L	C	L	L	L	L	D	W									
Position	3	4	3	3	6	7	6	7	6	6	7	7	7	7	8	8	8									

Updated to match(es) played on 20 January 2013. Source: Pailan Arrows
W = Win; D = Draw; L = Loss

== Appearances and goals ==
As of 13 January 2013

No.	Pos	Nat	Player	Total		I-League		Federation Cup		Durand Cup	
No.	Pos	Nat	Player	Apps	Goals	Apps	Goals	Apps	Goals	Apps	Goals
1	GK	(India) IND	Soram Anganba	10	0	8+0	0	2+0	0	0+0	0
2	DF	(India) IND	Jayabrata Dhar	0	0	0+0	0	0+0	0	0+0	0
3	DF	(India) IND	Arijeet Singh	0	0	0+0	0	0+0	0	0+0	0
4	DF	(India) IND	Vishal Kumar	8	0	2+5	0	1+0	0	0+0	0
5	DF	(India) IND	Shouvik Ghosh	17	0	14+0	0	1+0	0	2+0	0
6	DF	(India) IND	Avinabo Bag	11	1	3+4	0	2+0	0	2+0	1
7	MF	(India) IND	Milan Singh	19	5	15+0	4	2+0	0	2+0	1
8	MF	(India) IND	Yaikhom Randhan Meitei	0	0	0+0	0	0+0	0	0+0	0
10	FW	(India) IND	Alwyn George	17	1	15+0	1	2+0	0	0+0	0
11	FW	(India) IND	Holicharan Narzary	19	7	15+0	4	2+0	2	2+0	1
13	FW	(India) IND	Malsawmfela	3	0	0+3	0	0+0	0	0+0	0
14	DF	(India) IND	Prathamesh Maulingkar	8	1	3+2	1	2+0	0	1+0	0
15	MF	(India) IND	Shilton D'Silva	0	0	0+0	0	0+0	0	0+0	0
16	DF	(India) IND	Pritam Kotal	18	0	15+0	0	1+0	0	2+0	0
17	MF	(India) IND	Rajinder Kumar	14	1	11+2	1	1+0	0	0+0	0
19	MF	(India) IND	Tirthankar Sarkar	13	1	5+5	1	1+0	0	1+1	0
20	MF	(India) IND	Chingkhei Yumnam	3	0	0+0	0	1+0	0	2+0	0
21	MF	(India) IND	Simranjit Singh	0	0	0+0	0	0+0	0	0+0	0
22	GK	(India) IND	Ravi Kumar	9	0	5+1	0	1+0	0	2+0	0
23	MF	(India) IND	Siam Hanghal	0	0	0+0	0	0+0	0	0+0	0
24	FW	(India) IND	Pankaj Sona	0	0	0+0	0	0+0	0	0+0	0
25	MF	(India) IND	Deepak Prakash	0	0	0+0	0	0+0	0	0+0	0
26	DF	(India) IND	Deepak Devrani	15	2	12+0	1	2+1	1	0+0	0
27	MF	(India) IND	Shaiju Mon	12	0	1+8	0	1+1	0	1+0	0
28	MF	(India) IND	Irfan Khan	1	0	0+0	0	0+0	0	1+0	0
29	GK	(India) IND	Sayan Roy	2	0	2+0	0	0+0	0	0+0	0
30	DF	(India) IND	Sonu Beniwal	2	0	0+2	0	0+0	0	0+0	0
32	MF	(India) IND	Prabir Das	17	1	14+1	0	1+0	1	1+0	0
34	MF	(India) IND	Dhanpal Ganeshan	14	1	7+4	0	2+0	1	1+0	0
35	MF	(India) IND	Narayan Das	13	2	12+1	2	0+0	0	0+0	0
37	MF	(India) IND	Pronay Halder	16	0	11+1	0	2+0	0	2+0	0
38	FW	(India) IND	Seminlen Doungel	1	0	1+0	0	0+0	0	0+0	0

== Goalscorers ==
Place	Position	Nationality	Name	I-League	Federation Cup	Durand Cup	Total
1	FW	(India)	Holicharan Narzary	4	2	1	7
2	MF	(India)	Milan Singh	4	0	1	5
3	DF	(India)	Deepak Devrani	1	1	0	2
3	MF	(India)	Narayan Das	2	0	0	2
5	DF	(India)	Avinabo Bag	0	0	1	1
5	FW	(India)	Alwyn George	1	0	0	1
5	DF	(India)	Tirthankar Sarkar	1	0	0	1
5	MF	(India)	Prabir Das	0	1	0	1
5	MF	(India)	Dhanpal Ganeshan	0	1	0	1
5	DF	(India)	Prathamesh Maulingkar	1	0	0	1
			TOTALS	14	5	3	22
