= Ong Lepcha =

Indian footballer (born 1988)

Personal information
- Full name: Ong Tshering Lepcha
- Date of birth: 14 April 1988 (age 38)
- Place of birth: Dzongu, Sikkim, India
- Position: Forward

Team information
- Current team: Sikkim Himalayan
- Number: 13

Senior career*
Years	Team	Apps	(Gls)
- Churchill Brothers
2009	Indian Nationals		
2010	Bengal Mumbai		
2010	→ Kenkre (loan)		
2012	United Sikkim		
2012–2013	Air India	11	(1)
2015–	Gangtok Himalayan		

International career
- India U16
- India U19
- * Club domestic league appearances and goals

Ong Tshering Lepcha (born 14 April 1988) is an Indian footballer who plays as a forward for Sikkimese Gangtok Himalayan SC.

== Club career ==
=== Early career ===
Lepcha was born in Dzongu, Sikkim. He started his footballing career with Churchill Brothers S.C. on the I-League, however in 2007 Lepcha suffered a right knee injury after a harsh 50/50 tackle in a pre-season warm-up match. As a result of the injury Lepcha was forced to sit-out of football for six months. After spending time getting treatment in Mumbai Lepcha flew back to Goa to spend time at the club, off the field. After six months on the side-lines Lepcha moved to Kolkata where he began his rehabilitation.

After getting fully healed and released by Churchill Brothers Lepcha joined Indian Nationals FC of the I-League 2nd Division in 2009. After spending one season at the club Lepcha signed for Bengal Mumbai FC who also play in the I-League 2nd Division but got loaned out to Kenkre FC for the 2010 I-League 2nd Division. Lepcha then joined United Sikkim F.C. also of the I-League 2nd Division for a season and in his first season with the club, won them promotion to the I-League.

=== Air India ===
Lepcha signed for Air India FC during the summer of 2012 and made his debut for the club on 26 August 2012 against Delhi United FC in the 2012 Durand Cup. Ong Lepcha then helped Air India to win the tournament on 1 September 2012 when Air India defeated Dodsal F.C. in the final of the Durand Cup in which was Lepcha's first ever championship as a professional. Lepcha then made his I-League debut for Air India on 7 October 2012 against Prayag United S.C. at the Salt Lake Stadium in which Lepcha played 54 minutes before being replaced by Abhishek Ambedkar; Air India lost the match 5–1.

== International career ==
Lepcha has represented India at both the under-16 and under-19 levels and has also captained the team at both levels.

== Career statistics ==
=== Club ===
Statistics accurate as of 27 March 2013

Club	Season	League		Federation Cup		Durand Cup		AFC		Total	
Club	Season	Apps	Goals	Apps	Goals	Apps	Goals	Apps	Goals	Apps	Goals
Air India	2012–13	11	1	2	0	0	0	—	—	13	1
Career total		11	1	2	0	0	0	0	0	13	1
