= England A cricket team in India and Bangladesh in 1994–95 =

An England "A" team, led by Alan Wells, toured India and Bangladesh during January and February 1995.

== The India part ==
England 'A' Cricket Team in India in 1994-95
	England 'A'	India 'A'
- Dates: 1 Jan – 16 February 1995
Captains	Alan Wells	Pravin Amre

Date	Venue			Result	Scorecard
Jan 2 (1 day 50 over match	Bombay (Brabourne)	CCI 209/6 (S.Dighe 55, Amol Muzumdar 49)	England 'A' 208/8 (Allan Wells 44, David Hemp 43, Sairaj Bahutule 5/41)	CCI wins by 1 run	
Jan 3-6 (4 day match)	Bombay (Wankhede)	England A: 283 (D. Cork 69, Mark Ramprakash 59 and 204 (Balaji Rao 5/56)	India Youth 199 (Amol Muzumdar 68, Ian Salisbury 6/48) and 21/1	Match drawn	
Jan 9-12 (4 day match)	Madras (Chidambaram)	Board President's XI 333/6 (Decl.) (Rahul Dravid 84, Sourav Ganguly 69, Vikram Rathore 59) & 204/4 (Decl.) (Sourav 65, Dravid 49)	England A: 247 Jason Gallian 79, Kanwaljit Singh 4/56) & 168/9 (Kanwaljit Singh4/67)	Match drawn	
Jan 14-18 (5 day unofficial Test)	Bangalore (Chinnaswamy)	India 'A' 300 (Rathore 90, Dravid 60, Richard Stemp 6/83) and 104 (Amol Muzumdar 51, Glen Chapple 5/32)	England 'A' 289 (Ramprakash 99, Gallian 58, Nick Knight 50, Bahutule 4/96) and 117/6 Mark Ramprakash 36*)	England 'A' wins by 4 wickets	
Jan 21-24 (4 day match)	Delhi (Feroz Shah Kotla)	England A: 553( Ramprakash 124, Jason Gallian 100, Weekes 93) & & 214/5 (Decl.) (Michael Vaughan 87)	Combined Universities 165 & 163 (Min Patel 6/35)	England 'A' wins by 439 runs	
Jan 27-31 (5 day unofficial test)	Calcutta (Eden Gardens)	India 'A' 216 (Utpal Chatterjee 72) & 353 (Vikram Rathore 127, Rahul Dravid 52)	England A: 316 (Alan Wells 93, Jason Gallian 77) and 254/5 (David Hemp 99*, Wells 65)	England 'A' wins by 5 wickets	
Feb 4-8 (5 day unofficial test)	Chandigarh(PCA)	India 'A' 229 (Dravid 59, Chapple 4/60) & 156 (Amal Majumder 55, Dravid 47, Chapple 5/38)	England 'A' 209( & 179/9 (Kanwaljit 4/49, Chatterjee 4/71	England 'A' wins by 1 wicket	
Feb 11 (One day 50 over match)	Indore (Nehru Stadium)	India A: 201 (Amol Muzumdar 79)	England A 195 (Chatterjee 4/32)	India 'A' wins by 6 runs	
Feb 14 (One day 50 over match)	Ahmedabad	India 'A' 207 (Amol Muzumdar 69, Dravid 59)	England A: 208/7(Ramprakash 70)	England 'A' wins by 3 wickets	
Feb 16 (One day 50 over match	Hyderabad	England 'A' 254/6 (Knight 114, Ramprakash 57)	India'A' 156 (Weekes 3/40	England 'A' wins by 98 runs	

== The Bangladesh part ==
England 'A' Cricket Team in Bangladesh in 1994-95
	England 'A'	Bangladesh
- Dates: 20 February – 26 February 1995
Captains	Alan Wells	Akram Khan (cricketer)

Date	Venue			Result	Scorecard
20 Feb (One day 50 over match)	Dhaka (BNS)	England A: 203/8 (Gallian58, Wells 47	Bangladesh: 145/8 (Minhajul Abedin34)	England A win by 58 runs	
22 Feb (One day 50 over match)	Dhaka (BNS)	England A: 235/6 (Knight) 117, Hemp 52	Bangladesh: 215 all out (Aminul Islam 52)	England A win by 20 runs	
24 Feb - 26 Feb (3 day match)	Dhaka (BNS)	Bangladesh: 365/6d (105.5 overs) (Aminul Islam 121, Minhajul Abedin 81)	England A: 421/7 (127.1 overs) (Hemp 190, Knight 150)	Match drawn	

== Sources ==
- Wisden Cricketers' Almanack 1996, pp. 1004–13
- Indian Cricket 1995
