= 2012 Durand Cup =

125th season of the Durand Cup

Durand Cup
Tournament details
- Country: India
- Teams: 12

Final positions
- Champions: Air India (1st title)
- Runners-up: Dodsal

Tournament statistics
- Matches played: 27
- Goals scored: 43 (1.59 per match)
- Top goal scorer: (India) M. Kamei (3)

The 2012 Durand Cup was the 125th season of the Durand Cup, the third oldest football tournament in the world, which is a knock-out competition held in India. Churchill Brothers were the current holders, having beaten Prayag United in the 2011 Final.

The tournament was held from 16 August to 1 September with all matches at the Ambedkar Stadium in New Delhi.

Air India won the 2012 Durand Cup in the final after beating Dodsal 3–2 on penalties after the match ended 0–0 after 120 minutes.

== Preliminary round ==
=== Round 1 ===
16 August 2012	Delhi United	2–2 (a.e.t.) (7–6 p)	Indian Navy	Ambedkar Stadium, New Delhi
	Choudhury 32'; Joshi 51'	Report	Singh 28'; Sumesh 52'

16 August 2012	Army Green	2–0	J&K Bank	Ambedkar Stadium, New Delhi
	Singh 75', 87'	Report

17 August 2012	JCT Academy	2–1	ARTY Central	Ambedkar Stadium, New Delhi
	A. Singh 16'; G. Singh 24'	Report	Lawrence 56'

17 August 2012	Assam Rifles	4–1	ASC Centre	Ambedkar Stadium, New Delhi
	Jigdung 11', 14', 34'; Lalrinkeima 80'	Report	Karthik 45'

18 August 2012	BEG Kirkee	0–1	BSF	Ambedkar Stadium, New Delhi
		Report	Unknown

18 August 2012	Uttrakhand Police	0–6	CRPF	Ambedkar Stadium, New Delhi
		Report	Sugesh 38'; Shibu 53', 57', 89'; Varinder 47'; Athoiba 74'

19 August 2012	Punjab Police	7–1	Subrata Academy	Ambedkar Stadium, New Delhi
	Hi. Singh 10'; J. Singh 23', 25'; Hp. Singh 60', 67'; Hj. Singh 76', 79'	Report	Shnyasi 85'

19 August 2012	Indian Air Force	0–0 (a.e.t.) (3–4 p)	Garhwal Heros	Ambedkar Stadium, New Delhi
		Report

=== Round 2 ===
20 August 2012	CRPF	0–0 (a.e.t.) (5–3 p)	BSF	Ambedkar Stadium, New Delhi
		Report

20 August 2012	Army Green	0–2	Delhi United	Ambedkar Stadium, New Delhi
		Report	Singh 8'; Kapur 26'

21 August 2012	Garhwal Heros	1–2	Punjab Police	Ambedkar Stadium, New Delhi
	Bala 80'	Report	Singh 52'; Kumar 65'

21 August 2012	Assam Rifles	3–0	JCT Academy	Ambedkar Stadium, New Delhi
	Singh 7', 53'; Kamei 33'	Report

== Quarter-finals ==
The quarter-finals of the Durand Cup shall be played between 12 teams. Five of the teams currently play in 2012–13 I-League, two played in the 2012 I-League 2nd Division and one currently play in the Mumbai Football League. The other four spots would have been taken up by the top three teams from the preliminary round plus one service team. However, on 22 August 2012 it was announced that HAL SC would withdraw from the tournament (along with Churchill Brothers SC who withdrew before the initial list of teams was released) and thus freeing an extra space. So in order to fill it up the Durand Football Committee decided to qualify the four teams remaining in the preliminary rounds. Therefore, Delhi United FC, FC Punjab Police, Assam Rifles FC, and CRPF FC will qualify directly for the quarter-finals.

=== Group A ===
Team	Pld	W	D	L	GF	GA	GD	Pts
Air India	2	1	1	0	4	1	+3	4
Pailan Arrows	2	0	2	0	3	3	0	2
Delhi United	2	0	1	1	2	5	−3	1

=== Group B ===
Team	Pld	W	D	L	GF	GA	GD	Pts
Assam Rifles	2	1	1	0	4	3	+1	4
Sporting Goa	2	1	0	1	5	4	+1	3
ONGC	2	0	1	1	2	4	−2	1

=== Group C ===
Team	Pld	W	D	L	GF	GA	GD	Pts
SESA Football Academy	2	1	1	0	4	3	+1	4
Pune	2	0	2	0	1	1	0	2
Central Reserve Police	2	0	1	1	2	3	−1	1

=== Group D ===
Team	Pld	W	D	L	GF	GA	GD	Pts
Dodsal	2	2	0	0	9	0	+9	6
Army Red	2	1	0	1	1	3	−2	3
FC Punjab Police	2	0	0	2	0	7	−7	0

== Semi-finals ==
30 August 2012	Air India	2–2 (a.e.t.) (7–6 p)	SESA Football Academy	Ambedkar Stadium, New Delhi
16:00 IST	Mohanraj 55'; G.Singh 90+4'	Report	S. Singh 35'; Chukwuma 44'

30 August 2012	Assam Rifles	1–1 (a.e.t.) (5–6 p)	Dodsal	Ambedkar Stadium, New Delhi
18:00 IST	Kamei 72'	Report	Kumar 80'

== Final ==
1 September 2012	Air India	0–0 (a.e.t.) (3–2 p)	Dodsal	Ambedkar Stadium, New Delhi
18:30 IST		Report
	Penalties
	Mohanraj (penalty scored); Shetty (penalty scored); Meher (penalty missed); Chaudhari (penalty missed); R. Singh (penalty scored)		(penalty missed) Pradeep; (penalty scored) Kumar; (penalty scored) Diakhate; (penalty missed) Ghosh; (penalty missed) Rafi

== Scorers ==
All goals from tournament proper. Goals from qualifiers are not counted in this list.

3 goals

- (India) M. Kamei (Assam Rifles)

2 goals

- (Nigeria) Michael Okwudiu (Delhi United)
- (India) Mohammed Rafi (Dodsal)
- (India) Thoi Singh (Dodsal)
- (India) Pappachen Pradeep (Dodsal)
- (India) Sunil Kumar (Dodsal)
- (Nigeria) Ogba Kalu Nnanna (Sporting Goa)
- Pradeep Mohanraj (Air India)
- (Nigeria) Chukwudi Chukwuma (SESA Football Academy)

1 goal

- (India) Jeje Lalpekhlua (Pune)
- (India) Holicharan Narzary (Pailan Arrows)
- (India) Milan Singh (Pailan Arrows)
- (India) Avinabo Bag (Pailan Arrows)
- Souvik Chakraborty (Air India)
- (Cameroon) Bong Bertrand (Sporting Goa)
- (India) Victorino Fernandes (Sporting Goa)
- (India) Pratesh Shirodkar (Sporting Goa)
- (India) Kailash Patil (ONGC)
- (India) Yogesh Kadam (SESA Football Academy)
- (India) Inacio Colaco (SESA Football Academy)
- (India) Don Bosco Andrew (SESA Football Academy)
- (India) Sunny Singh (SESA Football Academy)
- (India) P. Soumerjit (Central Reserve Police Force)
- (India) Sugesh (Central Reserve Police Force)
- (India) Herojit Singh (Army Red)
- (Senegal) Demba Diakhaté (Dodsal)
- (India) Nawab Zeeshan (Dodsal)
- Ong Lepcha (Air India)
- Neil Gaikwad (Air India)
- Gagandeep Singh (Air India)
- (India) Bulu Jidung (Assam Rifles)
- (India) Ajit Kumar Singh (Assam Rifles)
