= Palaniswamy =

Palaniswamy is a surname. Notable people with the surname include:

- K. R. Palaniswamy (born 1954), Indian gastroenterologist, medical academic, and writer
- N. Palaniswamy, Indian politician
- Edappadi K. Palaniswami (born 1954), Indian politician
