= Singai G. Ramachandran =

Indian politician

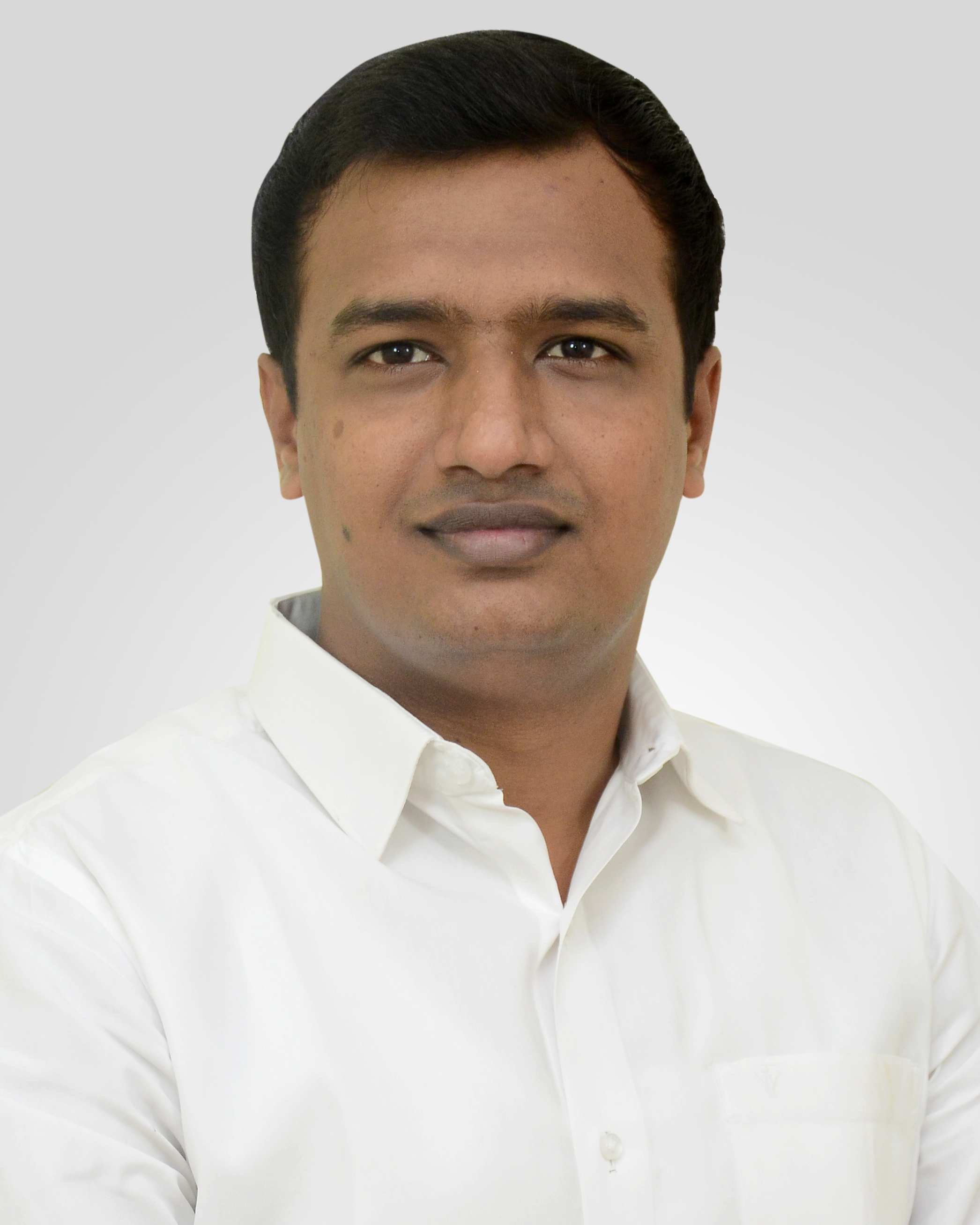

Member of Tamilaga Vetri Kalagam
- In office 25 December 2024 – 23 July 2026
- General Secretary: Edappadi K. Palaniswami
- Preceded by: S. R. Vijayakumar

IT Wing President of the All India Anna Dravida Munnetra Kazhagam
- In office 27 September 2023 – 25 December 2024
- General Secretary: Edappadi K. Palaniswami
- Preceded by: position established
- Succeeded by: Kovai Sathyan

IT Wing Secretary of the All India Anna Dravida Munnetra Kazhagam
- In office November 2017 – 27 September 2023
- General Secretary: Edappadi K. Palaniswami
- Preceded by: V. V. R. Raj Satyen
- Succeeded by: V. V. R. Raj Satyen
- In office 21 March 2016 – 8 February 2017
- General Secretary: J. Jayalalithaa; V. K. Sasikala (acting); Edappadi K. Palaniswami
- Preceded by: Aspire K. Swaminathan
- Succeeded by: V. V. R. Raj Satyen

Personal details
- Born: 11 December 1987 (age 38) Coimbatore, Tamil Nadu
- Party: Tamilaga Vettri Kazhagam
- Other political affiliations: All India Anna Dravida Munnetra Kazhagam
- Spouse: Shruthi Ramachandran
- Children: 1 son (Nandhivarman)
- Parent: Singai Govindarasu (father)
- Education: B.E., M.B.A.
- Alma mater: PSG College of Technology; Indian Institute of Management Ahmedabad

Singai Govindarasu Ramachandran is an Indian politician from Tamil Nadu, affiliated with the All India Anna Dravida Munnetra Kazhagam (AIADMK). In March 2016, the AIADMK general secretary and then Chief Minister of Tamil Nadu J. Jayalalithaa appointed him as Secretary of the party’s Information Technology Wing. He also served as President of the IT Wing of the party from 2023 to 2024. On 25 December 2024, he was appointed as the AIADMK Student Wing Secretary by the party general secretary Edappadi K. Palaniswami.

== Early life and education ==
He is the son of Singai Govindarasu, who was an MLA in Singanallur from 1991 to 1996. He did his schooling from Perks Matriculation Higher Secondary School, then went on to earn a diploma in Electrical and Electronics Engineering (EEE) at PSG Polytechnic College, and subsequently obtained his Bachelor of Engineering (BE) in Electronics and Communication Engineering (ECE) from PSG College of Technology. He worked for three years at Focus Academy for Career Enhancement before joining the IIM Ahmedabad to pursue an MBA in 2013. Ramachandran was also active in student politics. He participated in the Students Affairs Council (SAC) election at IIM Ahmedabad and was elected as the general secretary.

In an interview with Rediff.com, he said that he joined the party when he was 18.

== Career ==
On 21 March 2016, Ramachandran was appointed as the secretary of the IT wing of AIADMK by party supremo and Chief Minister, Jayalalithaa. He opted out of placements and started working for party. He went abroad to get trained for his IT wing activities. He has set up E-Sevai centers free of charge for the public at various places in Singhanallur assembly constituency of Coimbatore district.

Under his leadership, the IT Wing contributed to the party's victory in the Tamil Nadu Assembly Elections 2016.

After the death of CM J.Jayalalithaa, he was among the first party secretaries to lend support to the O. Panneerselvam faction.

In February 2017, he was expelled from the party by V. K. Sasikala for alleged anti-party activities. However, his removal comes after he offered support to O Panneerselvam.

After the merger of the two factions, he was re-appointed as the AIADMK IT Wing State Secretary.

He left the AIADMK and joined TVK in 2026. He has been appointed as the chief of Tamilnadu Startup and Innovation Mission in September 2026.

== Positions held ==
#	From	To	Position	Comments
01	November 2017	September 2023	Secretary, All India Anna Dravida Munnetra Kazhagam, IT Wing	
02	March 2016	February 2017	Secretary, All India Anna Dravida Munnetra Kazhagam, IT Wing	
03	March 2014	April 2015	General Secretary, Students Affairs Council, IIM Ahmedabad	
04	September 2026	Present	Chief Executive Officer, Tamilnadu Startup and Innovation Mission	

== Electoral performance ==
=== Lok Sabha elections ===
Elections	Lok Sabha	Constituency	Political party	Result	Vote percentage	Opposition		
Elections	Lok Sabha	Constituency	Political party	Result	Vote percentage	Candidate	Political party	Vote percentage
2024	18th	Coimbatore	AIADMK	Lost	17.23%	P. Ganapathy Rajkumar	DMK	41.39%

== Controversies ==
=== Social Media Manipulation Allegations (2021) ===
The Dravida Munnetra Kazhagam (DMK) alleged that the All India Anna Dravida Munnetra Kazhagam (AIADMK) IT Wing, under Ramachandran's leadership, engaged in improper social media practices. The allegations were based on circulated screenshots that purportedly showed instructions for creating multiple social media accounts and using automated tools to amplify content. A DMK spokesperson characterized the alleged activities as violations of information technology laws and electoral conduct regulations. Ramachandran disputed the authenticity of the screenshots, describing them as fabricated.

=== MLA Quota Admission Controversy (2024) ===
During the 2024 Coimbatore Lok Sabha election campaign, Bharatiya Janata Party (BJP) candidate K. Annamalai alleged that Ramachandran obtained his college admission through an "MLA quota" based on paternal influence. He responded by demanding an apology, stating that Annamalai's comments were hurtful. Ramachandran had previously stated in interviews that his father died when he was 11 years old.
