= Halicharan Narzary =

Indian footballer (born 1994)

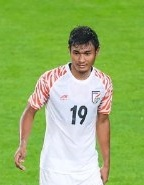
- Narzary playing for India at the 2019 AFC Asian Cup

Personal information
- Full name: Halicharan Narzary
- Date of birth: 10 May 1994 (age 32)
- Place of birth: Kokrajhar, Assam, India
- Height: 1.80 m (5 ft 11 in)
- Position: Winger

Team information
- Current team: Bodoland

Youth career
- SAI

Senior career*
Years	Team	Apps	(Gls)
2010–2013	Pailan Arrows	33	(6)
2013–2016	Dempo	27	(1)
2014	→ Goa (loan)	3	(0)
2015	→ NorthEast United (loan)	3	(0)
2016–2018	NorthEast United	25	(0)
2017	→ DSK Shivajians (loan)	16	(4)
2018–2020	Kerala Blasters	26	(2)
2019	→ Chennaiyin (loan)	2	(0)
2020–2023	Hyderabad	44	(7)
2023–2026	Bengaluru	11	(0)
2025–2026	→ Diamond Habour (loan)	12	(3)
2026–	Bodoland	3	(4)

International career^{‡}
2011	India U19	4	(0)
2012–2017	India U23	8	(1)
2015–2021	India	27	(0)
Medal record
Representing India
SAFF Championship
Winner	2015 India
- * Club domestic league appearances and goals as of 17 May 2026 ‡ National team caps and goals as of 8 November 2022

Halicharan Narzary (born 10 May 1994) is an Indian professional footballer who plays as a winger.

== Club career ==
=== Youth career ===
He was born in Kokrajhar, BTR, Assam to a Bodo family.

Narzary first started playing football in his village of Kokrajhar, Assam, where he represented his school team. After impressing in the school leagues, he was called to attend a trial at a SAI hostel nearby. Having made the cut there, he went on to represent Assam at the U-16 National Championships in Mahilpur. His talent was spotted by scouts at the tournament and he earned a call up to the India U16 squad, from where he graduated to the India U19 team.

=== Pailan Arrows ===
Narzary joined Pailan Arrows (then AIFF XI and current Indian Arrows) for the 2010–11 I-League season. Narzary made his professional debut on 15 May 2011 Salgaocar as a substitute, where he scored his first goal at professional level, but could not prevent the Arrows from losing 1–3. During the 2011-12 I-League season, Narzary was not considered in the plans of the new coaches of Pailan Arrows, Sukhwinder Singh and Sujit Chakravarty, and he only made seven I-League appearances and he did not appear in the 2011 Federation Cup. However, in Pailan's first match of the 2012–13 overall season, on 25 August 2012 in the 2012 Durand Cup, Narzary scored against Delhi United, which ended in a 2–2 draw after the final whistle. Narzary started in the 2012 Federation Cup match against Dempo on 19 September 2012 in group stage, where he scored a goal to give Pailan Arrows the lead in the 52nd minute, however the match ended 1–1 after Clifford Miranda scored the equalizer in the 60th minute. Narzary then scored his second goal of the tournament against Shillong Lajong on 23 September 2012 in the 17th minute, as Pailan Arrows won the match 2–1 but were still knocked-out of the cup on point difference. Narzary played his first match of 2012–13 I-League season on 6 October 2012 against Mumbai FC, where he scored a brace, and thus helping Pailan to win the first match of their season with a score of 3–2. His next goal came against Air India FC on 11 October in the next matchday, where he opened the scoresheet by scoring a goal in the 42nd minute of the game, which ended in a 2–1 victory for Pailan. He scored his fourth goal of the season on 1 December in a comfortable 4–1 victory over ONGC FC, when the match was drawn until the 25th minute. Narzary scored his last goal of the season and last goal for the Arrows on 6 April 2013, when they faced Dempo, which ended in a 0–2 win for Pailan. Narzary left the club after making 25 appearances and scoring 5 times in his final campaign with Pailan Arrows.

=== Dempo ===
Pailan Arrows was disbanded after the 2012–13 season. So on 26 October 2013, it was announced that Narzary, along with Alwyn George, Narayan Das and Pronay Halder had been loaned to Dempo SC for the 2013–14 I-League season. Narzary played his debut match for the club on 1 November 2013 in a 0–0 draw against Mohun Bagan as a substitute for Gabriel Fernandes. He scored his debut goal for Dempo on 14 December in the season's second match against Mohun Bagan, which ended in a 0–1 victory for Dempo due to their only goal by Narzary. After the 2013–14 I-League season, Narzary was loaned to the Indian Super League side FC Goa for the inaugural season of the Indian Super League. He returned to the club for the 2014–15 I-League season after spending his off season as a loanee at FC Goa. Narzary played his first match of the season on 17 January 2015 in a 0–0 draw against defending champions Bengaluru FC. He played his last match for the club on 30 May against Salgaocar FC, which ended in a 2–0 defeat for Dempo. After the 2014–15 I-League season, Narzary left Dempo and went on for loan at Indian Super League side NorthEast United FC, on where he signed a permanent contract afterwards.

==== FC Goa (loan) ====
Narzary was loaned to the newly formed FC Goa for the inaugural season of the Indian Super League. He played his debut match for the club on 15 October 2014 against Chennaiyin FC, which ended in a 1–2 defeat for Goa. He played his last match for the club against Atlético de Kolkata (later ATK) on 10 December, which ended in a 1–1 draw after final whistle. After the season, Narzary left the club and joined Dempo after finishing his loan term at the club.

=== NorthEast United ===
==== 2015 season: Loan signing from Dempo ====
Narzary was loaned to NorthEast United by Dempo for the 2015 Indian Super League season. He played his debut match for the club against his former club FC Goa as a substitute for Siam Hanghal on 15 October 2015, which ended 1–3 to Goa. Narzary ended his 2015's ISL campaign on 25 November in a 1–1 draw as a substitute in their second match of the season against FC Goa.

==== 2016 season: Signing permanent contract ====
Narzary left Dempo and signed a permanent contract with NorthEast United for the 2016 Indian Super League. He played in the club's first match of the season against Kerala Blasters FC on 1 October 2016, which they ended up winning 1–0. He ended his 2016 ISL campaign goalless and stayed at the club for the upcoming ISL season, after being loaned to DSK Shivajians in the pre-season time.

==== 2017–18 season: Final season ====
After playing in the 2016–17 I-League season as a loanee with DSK Shivajians during the off season of Indian Super League, Narzary returned to NorthEast for the 2017–18 Indian Super League after completing his loan term. He played his first match of the season on 8 November 2017 in a 0–0 draw over Jamshedpur FC as a substitute for Seiminlen Doungel. Narzary left the club after playing his last match of the season on 4 March 2018 in a 1–0 defeat against ATK for Kerala Blasters after spending three seasons at the club.

==== DSK Shivajians (loan) ====
Narzary signed for then I-League club DSK Shivajians on loan from NorthEast United after the 2016 ISL campaign. He was loaned to the club along with four other players from NorthEast United for the 2016–17 season. Narzary played his debut match for the club in a 1–2 defeat on 14 January 2017 against East Bengal. He scored his debut goal in the match against Bengaluru FC on 5 February, where he found the net twice, as the match went down in a 2–2 tie after the final whistle. Narzary scored a brace again in the match against Mumbai FC on 11 March, which they won on a big margin of 5–0 due to the early brace scored by Narzary. He scored a total of 4 goals from 16 outings for DSK and returned to NorthEast United after finishing his loan term.

=== Kerala Blasters ===
Ahead of the 2018–19 season, Narzary signed for Indian Super League club Kerala Blasters. He played his first match for the club in the season opener against ATK on 29 September 2018, which ended 0–2 to Kerala Blasters. He scored his debut goal for the club against Mumbai City FC on 5 October, which ended in an 11 draw. Narzary was loaned out halfway through the season to Chennaiyin FC along with CK Vineeth, and played his rest of the season at the club. He returned to the Blasters for the 2019–20 season, and on 12 January 2020, he scored the winning goal against rivals ATK, as the game finished 1–0 in favor of Kerala. Narzary left Kerala Blasters after the season for Hyderabad FC after having registered 2 goals in his name after making 26 appearances for the club during his at the club.

==== Chennaiyin (loan) ====
In January 2019, Narzary signed for Chennaiyin FC on loan from Kerala Blasters for the rest of the 2018–19 ISL season. He made his debut for the club on 26 October 2019 in a 1–0 defeat against his former club NorthEast United. He also made his career continental debut at Chennaiyin by representing them in the 2019 AFC Cup against Minerva Punjab FC (current Punjab FC) in their group stage match of the tournament, which ended in a 0–0 draw. He left the club and returned to Kerala Blasters after finishing his loan term.

=== Hyderabad ===
In August 2020, Narzary signed for two-year deal with Hyderabad FC that lasts till the end of the 2021–22 season. He made his debut on the club's first match of the season against Odisha FC on 23 November 2020, which they won 0–1. He scored his debut goal for the club on 15 December in a 3–2 victory over East Bengal. Narzary scored a brace against his former club Chennaiyin FC on 4 January 2021 which they won 1–4 due to his twin goals. Narzary scored his fourth and final goal of the season on 19 January in a 1–1 draw against Odisha.

== International career ==
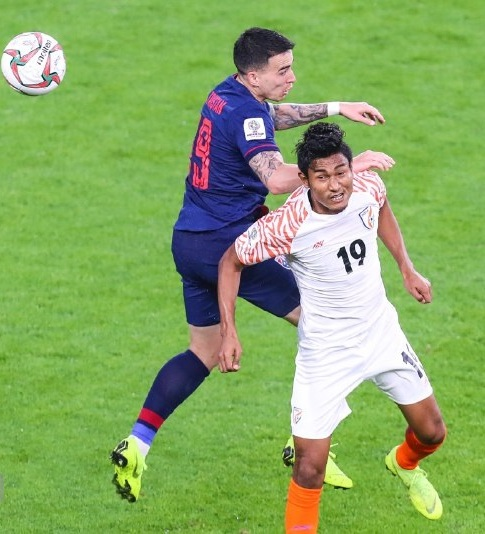
Narzary in action during 2019 AFC Asian Cup group match against Thailand.

Narzary represented India U19s and made his debut on 31 October 2011 in a match against Turkmenistan U19, which India U19s won 3–1. He made his debut for the India U23s in the 2013 AFC U-22 Championship qualifiers on 25 June 2012 by coming in as a 39th-minute substitute for Jeje Lalpekhlua against Iraq U23, which India U23 were vanquished by the score 2–1.

Narzary was called up for the India national football team to make his senior debut by representing them in the 2018 FIFA World Cup qualifiers. He made his debut on 12 March 2015 as an injury time substitute for Robin Singh against Nepal in a 2–0 win at Guwahati. Narzary was included in the Indian squad to take part in the 2015 SAFF Championship. He played in the final on 3 January 2016 against Afghanistan, which India emerged victorious by a score of 2–1, thereby winning his first international trophy. He scored his national debut goal in the friendly match against Bhutan on 13 August 2016, which ended in a comfortable 0–3 victory for India. He was included in the Indian squad for the 2019 AFC Asian Cup qualifiers, and also played in the last qualifying match of India against Kyrgyzstan on 27 March 2018, which India eventually lost 2–1 but topped the group table, thereby automatically qualifying for the AFC Asian Cup after the match against Macau after missing out the 2015's edition. Narzary was called up for the Indian squad for the 2018 Intercontinental Cup. India qualified and met Kenya in final match, where Narzary started and India won the final 2–0, thus becoming the champions of first edition of the Intercontinental Cup. This was Narzary's second international title. He represented India in the 2019 AFC Asian Cup. He played his debut match in AFC Asian Cup tournament, and also his first of the 2019's edition on 6 January 2019, where India outplayed Thailand, and dismantled them with a score of 1–4. It was also India's first victory in an AFC Asian Cup match in 55 years, and was also their biggest win in Asian Cup history. He played all three matches in their group stage including the must-win match against Bahrain on 14 January, which turned out to be a 0–1 defeat for India, resulting in the elimination of India from the campaign. After the Asian Cup exit, India named their 35-man squad for the 2022 FIFA World Cup qualifiers, where Narzary was also called-up.

== Style of play ==
Narzary is a left winger. A skillful left-footed player, he can also operate as a right winger, cutting inside onto his left foot. He has the ability to drive past defenders with his pace and deliver crucial crosses in the final third. He is also considered to be one of the best young players in the country.

== Personal life ==
Narzary was born in Kokrajhar, Assam. During an interview, he said that his father trained him in his first step's to football. He also played football for his school team during his childhood. His father died while he was young and his mother did small chores. On 2 October 2019, Narzary married Geetanjali Deori of Barpeta as per the Bodo tradition at Batabari village in Kokrajhar district of Assam.

== Career statistics ==
=== Club ===
As of 27 August 2024

Club	Season	League			Cup		AFC		Total	
Club	Season	Division	Apps	Goals	Apps	Goals	Apps	Goals	Apps	Goals
Pailan Arrows	2010–11	I-League	1	1	0	0	—		1	1
Pailan Arrows	2011–12	I-League	7	0	0	0	—		7	0
Pailan Arrows	2012–13	I-League	25	5	4	3	—		29	8
Pailan Arrows	Total		33	6	4	3	0	0	37	9
Dempo	2013–14	I-League	11	1	0	0	—		11	1
Dempo	2014–15	I-League	16	0	6 (Note: Appearance(s) in Federation Cup)	0	—		22	0
Dempo	2015–16	I-League 2nd Division	6	2	0	0	—		6	2
Dempo	Total		33	3	6	0	0	0	39	3
Goa (loan)	2014	Indian Super League	3	0	0	0	—		3	0
NorthEast United (loan)	2015	Indian Super League	3	0	0	0	—		3	0
NorthEast United	2016	Indian Super League	12	0	0	0	—		12	0
NorthEast United	2017–18	Indian Super League	13	0	1 (Note: Appearance(s) in Super Cup)	0	—		14	0
NorthEast United	Total		25	0	1	0	0	0	26	0
DSK Shivajians (loan)	2016–17	I-League	16	4	2	2	—		18	6
Kerala Blasters	2018–19	Indian Super League	12	1	0	0	—		12	1
Kerala Blasters	2019–20	Indian Super League	14	1	0	0	—		14	1
Kerala Blasters	Total		26	2	0	0	0	0	26	2
Chennaiyin (loan)	2018–19	Indian Super League	2	0	0	0	1 (Note: Appearance(s) in AFC Cup)	0	3	0
Hyderabad	2020–21	Indian Super League	20	4	0	0	—		20	4
Hyderabad	2021–22	Indian Super League	5	0	0	0	—		5	0
Hyderabad	2022–23	Indian Super League	19	3	9 (Note: Appearance(s) in Durand Cup)	1	1 (Note: Appearance in playoff for the AFC Cup qualifying play-off)	0	29	4
Hyderabad	Total		44	7	9	1	1	0	54	8
Bengaluru	2023–24	Indian Super League	11	0	3	0	–		14	0
Bengaluru	2024–25	Indian Super League	0	0	1	0	–		1	0
Bengaluru	Total		11	0	4	0	0	0	15	0
Diamond Harbour (loan)	2025–26	I-League	0	0	0	0	–		0	0
Career total			196	23	26	6	2	0	224	29

=== International ===
As of matches played till 29 March 2021

National team	Year	Apps	Goals
India	2015	3	0
India	2016	5	0
India	2017	8	0
India	2018	7	0
India	2019	3	0
India	2021	1	0
Total		27	0

==== International goals ====
Scores and results list India's goal tally first

No.	Date	Venue	Cap	Opponent	Score	Result	Competition	Ref.
1.	13 August 2016	Changlimithang Stadium, Thimphu, Bhutan	8	Bhutan	3–0	3–0	Friendly	(Note: Non-FIFA match)

== Honours ==
India

- SAFF Championship: 2015
- Tri-Nation Series: 2017
- Intercontinental Cup: 2018

India U23

- South Asian Games Silver medal: 2016

Dempo SC

- Federation Cup runner up: 2014–15

Chennaiyin FC

- Super Cup runner up: 2019

Hyderabad FC

- Indian Super League: 2021–22
