= Abhishek Ambekar =

Indian footballer (born 1991)

Personal information
- Date of birth: 11 August 1991 (age 35)
- Place of birth: Santacruz, Mumbai, India
- Height: 1.68 m (5 ft 6 in)
- Position: Left-back

Team information
- Current team: Jamshedpur
- Number: 18

Senior career*
Years	Team	Apps	(Gls)
2012–2013	Air India	3	(0)
2013–2014	Mumbai Tigers	0	(0)
2014–2015	Mumbai	0	(0)
2017–2018	Minerva Punjab	16	(0)
2018–2019	Mohun Bagan	15	(0)
2019–2021	East Bengal	14	(0)
2021	Sudeva Delhi	7	(0)
2021–2022	Rajasthan United	13	(0)
2022–2023	Mohammedan	14	(0)
2023–2025	Sreenidi Deccan	30	(0)
2026	Rajasthan United	11	(1)
2026–	Jamshedpur	0	(0)
- * Club domestic league appearances and goals as of 21:07, 19 May 2026 (UTC)

Abhishek Ambekar (born 11 August 1991) is an Indian footballer who plays as a defender for Indian Super League club Jamshedpur.

== Career ==
=== Early career ===
He began playing football in school, Smt. Sulochanadevi Singhania School, Thane and represented his school team and his college and state team later. He was roped into the Air India FC under-19 team, coached by former Indian player Godfrey Pereira, who is also from Santacruz.

=== Air India ===
The winger eventually graduated to Air India's senior team. Ambekar made his debut for Air India FC of the I-League on 7 October 2012 coming on as a 54th-minute substitute for Ong Lepcha; Air India lost 5–1.

=== Career pitfalls ===
Air India FC couldn't play in the I-League further as it didn't satisfy the Asian Football Confederation norms, according to the All India Football Federation. But this didn't hinder Ambekar's career as he joined the newly floated Mumbai Tigers, which had players like Steven Dias, Paresh Shivalkar under coach Bimal Ghosh, who helped Ambekar improve his game. But the club also couldn't survive for long. He joined Mumbai FC and later got a job with the Reserve Bank of India. The job rules didn't allow him to play at the professional level but he preferred RBI as it offered job security. During that time he played for Maharashtra in Santosh Trophy.

Later Ambekar was handed a lifeline by RBI, who agreed to release players and encouraged sportspersons to continue playing. It was what he had been waiting for. At the cost of risking his progress at work, Ambekar started sniffing at opportunities to play in the big leagues again. That chance came at fledgling side Minerva, who had finished 9th of 10 teams on their I-League debut last season.

=== Minerva Punjab ===
In 2017 he joined Minerva Punjab. He made his debut for Minerva on 25 November 2017 in I-League match against Mohun Bagan at Guru Nanak Stadium, Ludhiana as he played full match and his team drew the match 1-1. He became an inevitable ingredient of the side which eventually won the silverware. The I-League title triumph gave Ambekar's CV a necessary kick which was missing earlier in his career.

" It was a great experience playing for Minerva and we ended up winning the title after a hard fought season. It was the pre-season practice and team bonding that finally led Minerva to victory. It really boosted our careers"

— Ambekar on winning I-League

== Career statistics ==
=== Club ===
As of 5 April 2023

Club	Season	League			Cup		AFC		Other		Total	
Club	Season	Division	Apps	Goals	Apps	Goals	Apps	Goals	Apps	Goals	Apps	Goals
Air India	2012–13	I-League	3	0	0	0	—		—		3	0
Minerva Punjab	2017–18	I-League	16	0	1 (Note: Appearance(s) in Super Cup)	0	—		—		17	0
Mohun Bagan	2018–19	I-League	15	0	0	0	—		—		15	0
East Bengal	2019–20	I-League	10	0	2 (Note: Appearance(s) in Durand Cup)	0	—		8 (Note: Appearance(s) in Calcutta Football League)	0	20	0
East Bengal	2020–21	Indian Super League	4	0	0	0	—		—		4	0
East Bengal	East Bengal total		14	0	2	0	0	0	8	0	24	0
Sudeva Delhi	2020–21	I-League	7	0	0	0	—		—		7	0
Rajasthan United	2021–22	I-League	13	0	0	0	—		—		13	0
Mohammedan	2022–23	I-League	14	0	7	0	—		—		21	0
Sreenidi Deccan	2023–24	I-League	0	0	0	0	—		—		0	0
Career total			82	0	10	0	0	0	8	0	100	0

== Honours ==
=== Club ===
Minerva Punjab

- I-League: 2017–18

Mohun Bagan

- Calcutta Football League (1): 2018–19
