= Pradeep Mohanraj =

Indian footballer (born 1990)

Personal information
- Date of birth: 11 November 1990 (age 35)
- Place of birth: Ooty, India
- Height: 1.75 m (5 ft 9 in)
- Position: Midfielder

Team information
- Current team: Delhi Dynamos
- Number: 17

Senior career*
Years	Team	Apps	(Gls)
2011–2012	Chirag United Kerala	9	(0)
2012–2013	Air India	23	(2)
2013	Mumbai Tigers		
2013–2015	Mumbai	7	(0)
2017	Ozone FC	4	(0)
2018–	Delhi Dynamos	0	(0)
- * Club domestic league appearances and goals as of 17 May 2015

Pradeep Mohanraj (born 11 November 1990) is an Indian footballer who currently plays for Delhi Dynamos in the Indian Super League.

== Career ==
=== Chirag United Kerala ===
The 2011-12 football year got off to a good start for Pradeep as he made his debut for Chirag United Club Kerala in the 2011 Indian Federation Cup against Prayag United.

=== Air India ===
After failing to help Chirag United Kerala out of relegation Mohanraj signed for Air India FC who also play in the I-League and on 26 August 2012 made his debut for the club during the 2012 Durand Cup against Delhi United FC and even scored his first goal for the club and his career in the 18th minute as Air India went on to win the match 3–0. He then scored his second goal for the club on 30 August 2012 in the Semi-Finals of the 2012 Durand Cup against SESA Football Academy in the 55th minute; Air India went on to win the match 7–6 on penalties after the match finished 2–2 after regulation time. Then on 1 September 2012 Mohanraj won his first professional tournament of his career when Air India won against Dodsal F.C. 3–2 on penalties in the final of the 2012 Durand Cup; Mohanraj scored one of the penalties for Air India. Mohanraj then scored a brace for Air India on 4 November 2012 but this time in the professional I-League against ONGC F.C. at the Ambedkar Stadium in which Mohanraj scored in the 3rd and 14th minute of the match which led Air India to a 4–2 victory.

== Career statistics ==
=== Club ===
Statistics accurate as of 12 May 2013

Club	Season	League		Federation Cup		Durand Cup		AFC		Total	
Club	Season	Apps	Goals	Apps	Goals	Apps	Goals	Apps	Goals	Apps	Goals
Chirag United Kerala	2011–12	9	0	1	0	0	0	—	—	10	0
Air India	2012–13	23	2	3	0	4	2	—	—	30	4
Career total		32	2	3	0	4	2	0	0	40	4

== Honours ==
Air India

- Durand Cup (1): 2012
