= Rajen A. Kilachand =

Indian businessman

- Education: Boston University
- Occupations: Chairman and president of Dodsal Group
- Spouse: Nina Dev Kilachand
- Children: 3
- Website: www.dodsal.com/philanthropy/

Rajen Arvind Dev Kilachand is an Indian businessman. He is the chairman and President of the Dodsal Group, a UAE-based conglomerate founded by his family.

== Early life and education ==
Kilachand is the son of Arvind Nandlal Dev Kilachand and Chandanben Arvind Dev Kilachand. The family was originally from Patan, Gujarat. After his father's death, he took over Dodsal, a British trading company founded in 1948 by the Nandlal Dev Kilachand family.

Kilachand holds a master's degree from the Boston University Questrom School of Business.

== Career ==
Rajen Kilachand is the chairman & President of the Dodsal Group. He is a trustee and a member of the Board of Management of the Bhatia General Hospital in Mumbai, India. He is also the trustee of the Shree Somnath Temple Trust in Gujarat, India.

He was the former director of Federal Mogul Goetz India Limited, (1997 until 2006), and sat on the board of directors of Pathfinder International.

== Philanthropy ==
Kilachand has contributed an endowment of US$25 million for the Arvind and Chandan Dev Kilachand Honors College at Boston University. The donation is one of the largest in the university's history. The College delivers a liberal arts curriculum with a focus on innovation.

In 2017, Kilachand made a gift of $115 million to Boston University for research at the intersection of life sciences and engineering. The gift established a $100 million endowment to support in perpetuity research in these important areas. The gift, which also supported the construction of a center, is the largest in Boston University's history. The center opened in March, 2017 and is named the Rajen Kilachand Center for Integrated Life Sciences & Engineering.

A long time philanthropist, Kilachand who serves on the board of Pathfinder International helps in various global activities on reproductive health, family planning, and HIV/AIDS prevention and care in over 25 countries. He also supports Dubai Cares, an initiative of Sheikh Mohammed bin Rashid Al Maktoum, ruler of Dubai and vice-president and prime minister of the United Arab Emirates that aims to educate over one million children in impoverished countries.

Rajen Kilachand is the only foreign sponsor of the New Orleans Jazz Festival, along with funding various music and art festivals as well as community theatres including the Dubai Community Theatre and Arts Centre, the Majlis Gallery in Dubai, the Met in New York City, the Capital Jazz Festival and the Pune Festival.

He also supports various corporate and law and order initiatives, including the Asian Business Leadership Forum Awards, the India-UAE Knowledge Forum, the IPLOCA Conventions, the Arab Strategy Forum, the India-Arab World Business Summit and Police & the Union, UAE.

== Awards and recognition ==
- Global Business Achievement Award at the Masala Awards 2011
- Ranked 14th most influential Indian in the Gulf
