= R. Chinnaswamy =

Indian politician

R. Chinnaswamy is an Indian politician and was a member of the Tamil Nadu Legislative Assembly from the Singanallur constituency in Tamil Nadu. He joined DMK on December 03, 2025. In 2024, he joined the Bharatiya Janata Party in the presence of Tamil Nadu BJP chief K. Annamalai and Rajeev Chandrasekhar.

Chiinaswamy, who represents All India Anna Dravida Munnetra Kazhagam party, was elected to the Tamil Nadu Legislative Assembly from Singanallur in the 2006 elections and those of 2011.

The elections of 2016 resulted in his constituency being won by N. Karthik.
