= K. S. Sri Giri Prasath =

Indian politician (born 1983)

K. Sivashanmugam Sri Giri Prasath (born 1983) is an Indian politician from Tamil Nadu. He is a member of the Tamil Nadu Legislative Assembly from the Singanallur Assembly constituency in Coimbatore district representing the Tamilaga Vettri Kazhagam.

== Early life and education ==
Prasath is from Singanallur, Coimbatore district, Tamil Nadu. He is the son of K.Sivashanmugam. He studied at G.D.Matriculation Higher Secondary School, Coimbatore and passed his SSLC. examinations in 2001. Later, he did B.A. B.L.(Honours.), at the School of Excellence, the Tamil Nadu Dr. Ambedkar Law University, Chennai and passed out in May 2007. He is a practicing advocate at Chennai. He declared assets worth Rs.5 crore in his affidavit to the Election Commission of India.

== Career ==
Prasath won the Singanallur Assembly constituency representing the Tamilaga Vettri Kazhagam. He polled 84,163 votes and defeated his nearest rival, V. Srinidhi of the Indian National Congress, by a margin of 21.992 votes.
