= Chinnaswamy =

Chinnaswamy is a name. People with the name include:

- M. Chinnaswamy
- Mudnakudu Chinnaswamy
- Chinnaswamy Muniyappa
- V. K. Chinnaswamy
- R. Chinnaswamy

== Other ==
- M. Chinnaswamy Stadium
