= Singai Govindarasu =

Indian politician

Member of the Tamil Nadu Legislative Assembly
- In office 1991–1996
- Constituency: Singanallur Assembly constituency

Personal details
- Political party: All India Anna Dravida Munnetra Kazhagam
- Children: Singai G. Ramachandran (Son)

Singai Govindarasu was an Indian politician who served as a Member of the Legislative Assembly of Tamil Nadu. He was elected from Singanallur Assembly constituency as an All India Anna Dravida Munnetra Kazhagam candidate from 1991 to 1996.
