= Bimal Ghosh =

Indian Football Manager

Personal information
- Full name: Bimal Prafulla Ghosh
- Date of birth: 29 June 1956 (age 70)
- Place of birth: Kamptee, India
- Height: 1.80 m (5 ft 11 in)
- Position: Striker

Team information
- Current team: ICL Payyade F.C.

Managerial career
- Years: Team
- 1994–2009: Air India
- 2010: Bengal Mumbai FC
- 2012–2014: Mumbai Tigers
- 2015-2017: Nagpur FC
- 2018–2019: Tollygunge Agragami
- 2022: Indian Heroes Daman
- 2023: D.K. Pharma
- 2023-Present: ICL Payyade F.C.

Bimal Ghosh (born 29 June 1956) is an Indian former footballer and football manager, most notable for his 18-year tenure as the Head Coach of Air India Football Club in Mumbai.

He is a recipient of the Dronacharya Award, which is given to those coaches who have successfully trained sportspersons or teams to achieve outstanding results in international competitions. He has also won the NFL Best Coach Award.

Bimal Ghosh is most notable for producing over 32 players for the Indian national football team and many more for the Indian national youth teams and players who have had successful professional careers in the Indian Super League and I-League.

== Coaching career ==
=== Air India ===
During the first ever National Football League season in 1996–97, Ghosh was the coach the Air India FC.

=== Mumbai Tigers ===
In 2012, Ghosh became the first ever manager of Mumbai Tigers, a start-up team based in Mumbai in the I-League 2nd Division, then named Dodsal Football Club. On 1 September 2012, in Dodsal's first ever tournament, the 2012 Durand Cup, Ghosh led his side to the final where they would face, and lose, to his former side Air India FC 3–2 on penalties.

=== Nagpur ===
In February 2016, it was confirmed that Ghosh was coaching Nagpur Football Club during the YMFC Centennial All India Football tournament.

=== Tollygunge Agragami F.C. ===
In August 2018, Ghosh was appointed as the head coach of Calcutta Football League side Tollygunge Agragami.

== Coach ==
As of 1 June 2013

Team	From	To	Record				
Team	From	To	G	W	D	L	Win %
Mumbai Tigers	2012	2014	21	11	1	9	52.38
Total			21	11	1	9	52.38

== Honours ==
- Dronacharya Award: 2023
