= K. R. Jayaram =

Indian politician

Member of the Tamil Nadu Legislative Assembly
- In office 12 May 2021 – 4 May 2026
- Preceded by: N. Karthik
- Constituency: Singanallur

Secretary of the AIADMK Coimbatore Urban District MGR Youth Wing
- General Secretary: Edappadi K. Palaniswami

Personal details
- Born: Coimbatore
- Party: All India Anna Dravida Munnetra Kazhagam
- Spouse: J. Geetha
- Parent: K. Rangaswamy (father) Lakshmi (mother)

K. Rangaswamy Jayaram is an Indian Tamil politician. He won the 2021 Tamil Nadu Legislative Assembly Elections representing AIDMK in Singanallur. He also holds the post of Secretary in the MGR Youth Wing of Coimbatore Urban District in All India Anna Dravida Munnetra Kazhagam.

== Political career ==
K. R. Jayaram was elected as the Chairman of Sarcarsamakulam Panchayat Union in 2006, post the Local body elections. He was elected as the Zonal Head of the East Zone of Coimbatore Municipal Corporation in 2011. He contested and won the Singanallur seat in 2021 General Election by defeating the incumbent N. Karthik by 10,854 votes.

== Offices held/holding ==
- MLA of Singanallur: 2021–2026
- MGR Youth Wing of Coimbatore Urban District in All India Anna Dravida Munnetra Kazhagam: 2019–present
- Zonal Head - East Zone of Coimbatore Municipal Corporation: (2011-2016)
- Chairman, Sarcarsamakulam Panchayat Union: (2006-2011)

== Elections contested ==
Election	Constituency	Party	Result	Vote %	Runner-up	Runner-up Party	Runner-up vote %
2021 Tamil Nadu Legislative Assembly election	Singanallur	AIDMK	Won	40.22%	N.Karthik	DMK	34.84%
