= Milan Singh =

Indian footballer (born 1992)

Personal information
- Full name: Milan Singh Ongnam
- Date of birth: 15 May 1992 (age 34)
- Place of birth: Manipur, India
- Height: 1.77 m (5 ft 9 1/2 in)
- Position: Midfielder

Team information
- Current team: Mohammedan
- Number: 35

Youth career
- 2008–2010: Tata Football Academy
- 2010: East Bengal

Senior career*
Years	Team	Apps	(Gls)
2010–2013	Pailan Arrows	40	(7)
2013–2015	Shillong Lajong	33	(3)
2014	→ NorthEast United (loan)	5	(0)
2015–2017	DSK Shivajians	28	(2)
2016	→ Delhi Dynamos (loan)	15	(2)
2017–2018	Kerala Blasters	15	(0)
2018–2019	Mumbai City	9	(0)
2019–2020	Northeast United	13	(0)
2020–2021	East Bengal	8	(0)
2021–	Mohammedan	19	(0)

International career^{‡}
2012–2015	India U23	6	(0)
2017–	India	1	(0)
- * Club domestic league appearances and goals as of 17:35, 5 March 2023 (UTC) ‡ National team caps and goals as of 21 February 2021

Milan Singh Ongnam (born 15 May 1992) is an Indian professional footballer who plays as a midfielder for Mohammedan.

== Career ==
=== Pailan Arrows ===
During the summer of 2010 Singh signed with Pailan Arrows who were then AIFF XI in the I-League. He scored his first goal for the team against his former club East Bengal on 26 February 2011. After the 2010–11 season Singh reportedly went back to East Bengal but was rejected during pre-season and ultimately ended back at Pailan Arrows for the 2011–12 season. He scored his second ever goal for Pailan Arrows on 3 December 2011 against Mumbai F.C. in the I-League.

==== 2012–13 season ====
Singh began the season for Pailan Arrows during their first official tournament, the 2012 Durand Cup, with a goal in his first game of the season against Delhi United in the first match of the tournament for Pailan Arrows to help Arrows draw 2–2. Singh then played in two of the three matches for Pailan Arrows in their second tournament, the 2012 Indian Federation Cup.

Singh then opened his 2012-13 I-League campaign with a goal from the penalty spot as Pailan opened their campaign with a victory which was also the first I-League victory for new coach Arthur Papas. Singh then scored his second goal of the season, again from the penalty spot, in the 69th minute against Air India on 11 October 2012 to help Pailan Arrows win the match 2–1. Pailan however went on a run of bad form during the month of November and for Singh the month was summed up after he received a yellow card in Pailan's 3–1 loss to Shillong Lajong F.C. on 28 November 2012.

Singh then began the month of December in fashion by putting in a man of the match performance for Pailan Arrows in a 4–1 victory over ONGC F.C. in which Singh scored in the 57th minute from the penalty spot. Singh then scored again for Pailan Arrows on 22 December 2012 against Dempo from the penalty spot again but that was not enough as Pailan fell 2–1 to the reigning champions.

=== Shillong Lajong ===
On 19 May 2013, media revealed that Milan is going to join Shillong Lajong for next two-year. He made his debut for Shillong Lajong in the I-League on 22 September 2013 against Dempo S.C. at the Duler Stadium in which he played the whole match as Shillong Lajong won 0–3.

Milan represented North East United FC during the 2014 ISL

=== DSK Shivajians ===
Milan signed for I-League new entrants DSK Shivajians for season 2015–16. He played 12 games for the Pune-based clubs including starting 10 of those 12 games. At the end of the season his contract was renewed for a further season.

==== Delhi Dynamos (loan) ====
Indian Super League opportunity came calling again for Milan as he was signed on loan by the Delhi-based ISL side. On July 18, 2016, Delhi Dynamos announced that Milan would be joining the side for 2016 edition of the Indian Super League Coached by Italian legend and World Cup winner Gianluca Zambrotta, Milan made 15 starts for the side scoring 2 important goals against Pune City FC & Atletico de Kolkata. He had a standout ISL as Delhi Dynamos made it to the Semi-Finals while Milan was regarded as one of the stand-out Indian players in the league

=== Kerala Blasters ===
On 23 July 2017, Singh was selected in the 5th round of the 2017–18 ISL Players Draft by the Kerala Blasters for the 2017–18 Indian Super League. He made his debut for the club on 17 November 2017 against ATK. He started and played the full match as Kerala Blasters drew 0–0.

== International ==
=== Youth ===
On 23 June 2012, Singh made his debut for the India U23 team during the qualifying round of the 2013 AFC U-22 Asian Cup against Lebanon U23 in which India U23 won 5–2.

=== Senior ===
He made his senior team debut on 22 March 2017 in the friendly against Cambodia, which India won by 3–2.

== Career statistics ==
As of 21 February 2021

Club	Season	League			Cup		Continental		Total	
Club	Season	Division	Apps	Goals	Apps	Goals	Apps	Goals	Apps	Goals
Pailan Arrows	2010–11	I-League	1	1	0	0	—	—	1	0
Pailan Arrows	2011–12	I-League	13	1	0	0	—	—	13	1
Pailan Arrows	2012–13	I-League	26	5	4	1	—	—	30	6
Pailan Arrows	Pailan Arrows Total		40	7	4	1	0	0	44	8
Shillong Lajong	2013–14	I-League	19	2	3	0	—	—	22	3
Shillong Lajong	2014–15	I-League	14	1	4	0	—	—	18	1
Shillong Lajong	Shillong Lajong Total		33	3	7	0	0	0	40	4
NorthEast United (loan)	2014	ISL	5	0	—	—	—	—	5	0
DSK Shivajians	2015–16	I-League	12	0	0	0	—	—	12	0
DSK Shivajians	2016–17	I-League	16	2	3	0	—	—	19	2
DSK Shivajians	DSK Shivajians Total		28	2	3	0	0	0	31	2
Delhi Dynamos (loan)	2016	ISL	15	2	—	—	—	—	15	2
Kerala Blasters	2017–18	ISL	15	0	1	0	—	—	16	0
Mumbai City FC	2018–19	ISL	15	0	1	—	—	—	16	0
NorthEast United	2019–20	ISL	13	0	—	—	—	—	16	0
East Bengal	2020–21	ISL	8	0	—	—	—	—	8	0
Career total			172	14	16	1	0	0	188	15

=== International ===
As of 22 March 2017

National team	Year	Apps	Goals
India	2017	1	0

== Honours ==
Mohammedan Sporting

- Calcutta Football League: 2021
- Durand Cup runner-up: 2021
