= Rajinder Kumar (footballer) =

Indian footballer (born 1993)

Personal information
- Date of birth: 3 April 1993 (age 33)
- Place of birth: Chandigarh, India
- Height: 1.75 m (5 ft 9 in)
- Position: Forward

Team information
- Current team: Bharat FC
- Number: 24

Youth career
- 2007–2010: Chandigarh FA

Senior career*
Years	Team	Apps	(Gls)
2012–2013	Pailan Arrows	18	(1)
2013–2014	United	0	(0)
2015–	Bharat FC	7	(0)

International career
2011	India U19	3	(0)
- * Club domestic league appearances and goals as of 19 April 2015

Rajinder Kumar (born 3 April 1993, in Chandigarh) is an Indian footballer who plays as a forward for Bharat FC in the I-League.

== Career ==
=== Pailan Arrows ===
Kumar made his professional debut for Pailan Arrows on 19 September 2012 against Dempo S.C. in the first match of the 2012 Indian Federation Cup where Pailan drew against the reigning I-League champions 1–1. Kumar scored his first ever goal of his career on 12 January 2013 against Air India FC in the I-League at the Balewadi Sports Complex in Pune to help Pailan Arrows draw the match 1–1.

=== United ===
Kumar signed for United S.C. in January 2014. He made his debut on 14 January 2014 in the Indian Federation Cup match against Churchill Brothers at Jawaharlal Nehru Stadium, Kochi in which he came on as a substitute for C. K. Vineeth in the 63rd minute as United lost the match 2–1.

== Career statistics ==
=== Club ===
As of 17 January 2013

Club	Season	League		Federation Cup		Durand Cup		AFC		Total	
Club	Season	Apps	Goals	Apps	Goals	Apps	Goals	Apps	Goals	Apps	Goals
Pailan Arrows	2012–13	18	1	1	0	0	0	—	—	19	1
United	2013–14	0	0	3	0	0	0	-	-	3	0
Bharat FC	2014–15	3	0	0	0	0	0	-	-	3	0
Career total		21	1	4	0	0	0	0	0	25	1
