= N. Palaniswamy =

Indian politician

N. Palaniswamy is an Indian politician and was a Member of the Legislative Assembly of Tamil Nadu. He was elected to the Tamil Nadu legislative assembly as a Dravida Munnetra Kazhagam (DMK) candidate from Singanallur constituency in the 1996 election.
