= Arab Strategy Forum =

The Arab Strategy Forum is an annual conference, held in Dubai, United Arab Emirates (UAE). It is managed by the Ruler of Dubai, Sheikh Mohammed bin Rashid Al Maktoum. It stated aim is to be a platform for public and private sector leaders to develop future strategies.

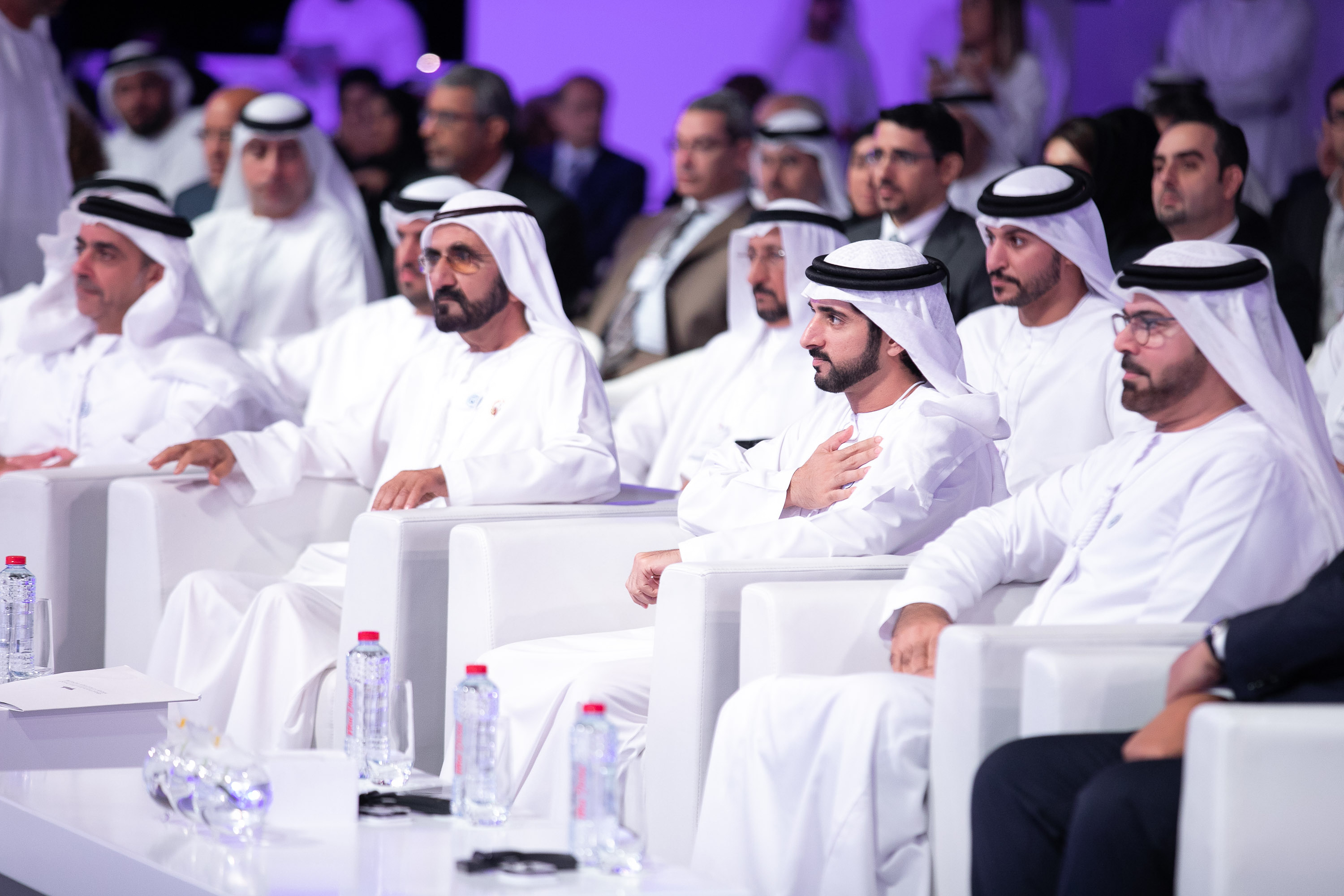
Mohammed bin Rashid, Hamdan bin Mohammed, Saif Bin Zayed and Mohammad Al Gergawi attending the Arab Strategy Forum 2018

== Launch ==
Launched in 2004, originally as a biennial three-day event titled the Dubai Strategy Forum, the Forum was conceived to promote debate on policy in the Arab world. It was renamed the Arab Strategy Forum in 2006. The keynote address at the inaugural forum was given by former US President Bill Clinton. It was relaunched in 2009 under the Mohammed bin Rashid Al Maktoum Foundation.

In 2015 it published a report costing the Arab Spring at $833.7 billion (attributing this to losses in GDP, drops in tourism; stock and financial market losses and drops in Foreign Direct Investment). In 2016, addressing the forum, Leon Panetta, former director of the CIA and former US Secretary of Defence, together with former British Prime Minister David Cameron, jointly called for a regional alliance against terrorism. Panetta asserted such a coalition “could be a powerful signal to Iran that it can’t go into countries as it did in Yemen and Syria.” The forum has often hosted contradictory views. In 2015 former British Foreign Secretary William Hague pointed to the growing threat of Daesh, while in 2014 Francis Fukuyama claimed the threat posed by the group had been overblown by media and the US. In 2018 both former French President Francois Hollande and former US Defense Secretary Robert Gates used the Forum as a platform to roundly condemn the US decision to open an embassy in Jerusalem.
