= Singanallur Assembly constituency =

One of the 234 State Legislative Assembly Constituencies in Tamil Nadu, in India

Coordinates: 11.00°N 77.03°E

Singanallur
- Constituency No. 121 for the Tamil Nadu Legislative Assembly
- Interactive map outlining Singanallur assembly constituency in Coimbatore district

Constituency details
- Country: India
- Region: South India
- State: Tamil Nadu
- District: Coimbatore
- Lok Sabha constituency: Coimbatore
- Established: 1967
- Total electors: 2,69,997
- Reservation: None

Member of Legislative Assembly
- 17th Tamil Nadu Legislative Assembly
- Incumbent K. S. Sri Giri Prasath
- Party: TVK
- Elected year: 2026

Singanallur Assembly constituency is a legislative Assembly constituency of Coimbatore district, Tamil Nadu. Its State Assembly Constituency number is 121. It contains 18 wards of Coimbatore which include the neighborhood of Singanallur. It is a part of Coimbatore Lok Sabha constituency. It is one of the 234 State Legislative Assembly Constituencies in Tamil Nadu, in India.

== Members of the Legislative Assembly ==
Election	Winner	Party
1967	P. Velusamy	Praja Socialist Party
1971	A. Subramaniam	Praja Socialist Party
1977	R. Venkatasamy	Communist Party of India (Marxist)
1980	A. D. Kulasekar	Dravida Munnetra Kazhagam
1984	R. Sengalippan	Janata Party
1989	Era Mohan	Dravida Munnetra Kazhagam
1991	P. Govindaraj	All India Anna Dravida Munnetra Kazhagam
1996	N. Palaniswamy	Dravida Munnetra Kazhagam
2001	K. C. Karunakaran	Communist Party of India (Marxist)
2006	R. Chinnaswamy	All India Anna Dravida Munnetra Kazhagam
2011	R. Chinnaswamy	All India Anna Dravida Munnetra Kazhagam
2016	N. Karthik	Dravida Munnetra Kazhagam
2021	K. R. Jayaram	All India Anna Dravida Munnetra Kazhagam
2026	K. S. Sri Giri Prasath	Tamilaga Vettri Kazhagam

== Election results ==
=== 2026 ===
2026 Tamil Nadu Legislative Assembly election: Singanallur
Party	Candidate	Votes	%	±%
TVK	K. S. Sri Giri Prasath	84,163	38.08	New
INC	V. Srinidhi	65,024	29.42	New
AIADMK	K. R. Jayaram	57,783	26.14	▼14.08
NTK	Nehruji Gunasekaran	9,203	4.16	▲0.02
NOTA	None of the above	1,346	0.61	▼0.10
BSP	Sivaji Perumal	428	0.19	New
All India Puratchi Thalaivar Makkal Munnetra Kazhagam	N.R.Appathurai	318	0.14	New
Independent	Thahir Hussain	278	0.13	New
Independent	Akbar Ali	255	0.12	New
Ganasangam Party of India	Murugan.O	228	0.10	New
Rashtriya Samaj Dal (R)	S.S.Sundharam	201	0.09	New
Independent	P.Tamilselvi	174	0.08	New
Independent	Janani.D	168	0.08	New
Independent	S.Satheesh	160	0.07	New
Party For The Rights Of Other Backward Classes	Sarveswaran	151	0.07	New
Independent	N.Rajasekaran	130	0.06	New
Independent	K.Kumar Babu	127	0.06	New
Independent	Uma Paramasivam	115	0.05	New
Independent	Rajkumar.M	111	0.05	New
Independent	Subaramanian.N	102	0.05	New
Independent	V.Balamurugan	91	0.04	New
Independent	M.Ashok Kumar	82	0.04	New
Independent	Vijayakumar	66	0.03	New
Independent	Dr.K.Rajkumar	65	0.03	New
Independent	Vasanthi	59	0.03	New
Independent	Karthik	54	0.02	New
Independent	R.Manikandabrabhu	53	0.02	New
Independent	Ayoob Riyas	50	0.02	New
Independent	A.Mounakumar	48	0.02	New
Margin of victory		19,139	8.66	▲3.28
Turnout		1,56,499	82.84	
Registered electors		2,69,997		
TVK gain from AIADMK		Swing	▲38.08	

=== 2021 ===
2021 Tamil Nadu Legislative Assembly election: Singanallur
Party	Candidate	Votes	%	±%
AIADMK	K. R. Jayaram	81,244	40.22	▲2.94
DMK	N. Karthik	70,390	34.84	▼5.18
MNM	R. Mahendran	36,855	18.24	New
NTK	R. Narmadha	8,366	4.14	▲1.83
None of the Above	None of the Above	1,432	0.71	▼1.27
Majority		10,854	5.38	▲2.74
Turnout		2,02,021		
AIADMK gain from DMK		Swing	+2.94	

=== 2016 ===
2016 Tamil Nadu Legislative Assembly election: Singanallur
Party	Candidate	Votes	%	±%
DMK	Karthik N	75,459	40.02	▲40.02
AIADMK	Singai Muthu N	70,279	37.28	▼19.04
BJP	Nandakumar C R	16,605	8.81	▲3.69
MDMK	Arjunaraj A	11,035	5.85	▲5.85
NTK	Kalyana sundaram S	4,354	2.31	New
Margin of victory		5,180	2.74	
Turnout		1,88,531	61.89	
DMK gain from AIADMK		Swing		

=== 2011 ===
2011 Tamil Nadu Legislative Assembly election: Singanallur
Party	Candidate	Votes	%	±%
AIADMK	R. Chinnaswamy	89,487	56.32	▲14.58
INC	Mayura S Jayakumar	55,161	34.71	▲34.71
BJP	Rajendran R	8,142	5.12	▲3.02
LSP	Dhandapani P	1,983	1.25	▲1.25
IND.	Vashan V V	1,663	1.05	New
Margin of victory		34,326	21.61	
Turnout		1,59,148	69.09	
AIADMK hold		Swing		

=== 2006 ===
2006 Tamil Nadu Legislative Assembly election: Singanallur
Party	Candidate	Votes	%	±%
AIADMK	R. Chinnaswamy	1,00,283	41.74	▲41.74
CPI(M)	A. Soundararajan	1,00,269	41.73	▼7.84
DMDK	Ponnusamy	31,268	13.01	New
BJP	Velusamy	5057	2.10	▲2.10
Independent	Rajkumar	2019	0.84	New
Margin of victory		14		
Turnout		2,40,267		
AIADMK gain from CPI(M)		Swing		

=== 2001 ===
2001 Tamil Nadu Legislative Assembly election: Singanallur
Party	Candidate	Votes	%	±%
CPI(M)	Karunakaran K C	82773	49.57	▲49.57
DMK	N. Palanisamy	62772	37.59	▼32.56
MDMK	Muthukrishnan G	14825	8.88	▼4.11
JD(S)	Ponnusamy K M	2723	1.63	▲1.63
Independent	Velusamy V	2008	1.2	New
Margin of victory		20001	11.98	
Turnout		166992	56.82	
CPI(M) gain from DMK		Swing		

=== 1996 ===
1996 Tamil Nadu Legislative Assembly election: Singanallur
Party	Candidate	Votes	%	±%
DMK	N. Palanisamy	92379	60.15	▲60.15
AIADMK	Duraisamy R	33967	22.12	▼33.34
MDMK	M. Kannappan	19951	12.99	New
BJP	Kalyanasundaram R	3741	2.44	▼2.25
Indian Congress (Socialist)	Palanisamy	363	0.24	▲0.24
Margin of victory		58412	38.03	
Turnout		153574	63.2	
DMK gain from AIADMK		Swing		

=== 1991 ===
1991 Tamil Nadu Legislative Assembly election: Singanallur
Party	Candidate	Votes	%	±%
AIADMK	Singai Govindarasu	68069	55.46	▲55.46
JD	Sengalipappan R	46099	37.56	▲37.56
BJP	Balaji V	5755	4.69	▲4.69
PMK	Veluchamy P	1096	0.89	New
Tharasu Makkal Mandram	Krishnasamy A	280	0.23	New
Margin of victory		21970		
Turnout		122727	59.22	
AIADMK gain from DMK		Swing		

=== 1989 ===
1989 Tamil Nadu Legislative Assembly election: Singanallur
Party	Candidate	Votes	%	±%
DMK	Mohan Era	63827	49.40	▲49.40
INC	Subaiah PL	25589	19.81	▼25.11
CPI(M)	Kannan S	22148	17.14	▲17.14
AIADMK	Karuppusamy N	15319	11.86	New
Independent	Balasundaram D	643	0.5	New
Margin of victory		38238		
Turnout		129195	70.5	
DMK gain from JP		Swing		

=== 1984 ===
1984 Tamil Nadu Legislative Assembly election: Singanallur
Party	Candidate	Votes	%	±%
JP	Sengalipappan R	54787	49.37	▲37.16
INC	Subrananiam A	49856	44.92	▲44.92
BJP	Natarajan KS	2103	1.89	New
Independent (Politician)	Three Star Natarajan	1375	1.24	New
Independent (Politician)	Kalaimani VC	1119	1.01	New
Margin of victory		4931	4.45	
Turnout		110981	71.02	
JP gain from DMK		Swing		

=== 1980 ===
1980 Tamil Nadu Legislative Assembly election: Singanallur
Party	Candidate	Votes	%	±%
DMK	Kulasekar AD	44523	45.16	▲22.78
CPI(M)	Venkatasamy	41302	41.90	▲13.94
JP	Sadasivan NS	12032	12.21	▼13.81
Independent	Sivasamy	452	0.46	New
Independent	Chinnakutty R	273	0.28	New
Margin of victory		3221	3.26	
Turnout		98582	66.34	
DMK gain from CPI(M)		Swing		

=== 1977 ===
1977 Tamil Nadu Legislative Assembly election: Singanallur
Party	Candidate	Votes	%	±%
CPI(M)	Venkatasamy	25820	27.96	▲15.63
JP	Sengalipappan R	24024	26.02	New
INC	Subrananiam A	20978	22.72	▲22.72
DMK	Veerasamy S	20662	22.38	▲22.38
Independent	Ramasamy SS	853	0.92	New
Margin of victory		1796	1.94	
Turnout		92337	69.72	
CPI(M) gain from PSP		Swing		

=== 1971 ===
1971 Tamil Nadu Legislative Assembly election: Singanallur
Party	Candidate	Votes	%	±%
PSP	Subrananiam A	35888	53.89	
INC	Subaian PL	20848	31.3	
CPI(M)	Venkatasamy	8209	12.33	
Independent	Marappan N	1653	2.48	New
Margin of victory		15040	22.59	
Turnout		66598	71.79	
PSP hold		Swing		
