= Harjinder Singh (footballer) =

Indian footballer and coach

Personal information
- Date of birth: 16 March 1970 (age 56)
- Place of birth: Phagwara, India
- Position: Defender

Senior career*
| Years | Team | Apps | (Gls) |
| 1989–2002 | JCT | | |

International career
| 1993 | India | 2 | (0) |

Managerial career
- 2003–2011: JCT (assistant)
- * Club domestic league appearances and goals

Harjinder Singh (born 16 March 1970) is a former Indian footballer and coach who played and coached all his career for Jagatjit Cotton & Textile Football Club (JCT FC) in the I-League.

== Career ==
=== Jagatjit Cotton & Textile Football Club ===
In 1989, Singh joined JCT FC which then only played at state level. In 1997, he led them to the first ever NFL title ever.

== As an All India Football Federation member ==
On 2 September 2022, Singh was elected as a member of the technical committee of the All India Football Federation.

== Honours ==
India

- SAFF Championship: 1993

India U20

- AFC Asian U-19 Championship: 1974
