= Dodsal Group =

Multinational conglomerate

- Company type: Private
- Industry: Conglomerate
- Founded: 1948; 78 years ago
- Founder: Nandlal Kilachand family, DODWEL and Karsa Salem
- Headquarters: Dubai, United Arab Emirates
- Area served: Worldwide
- Key people: Rajen A. Kilachand (Chairman & President); K. Surendran (CEO)
- Products: Trading & distribution, engineering, procurement and construction, mining, casual dining restaurants, manufacturing
- Owner: Rajen A. Kilachand
- Number of employees: over 25,000
- Website: www.dodsal.com

The Dodsal Group is a diversified multinational conglomerate headquartered in Dubai, United Arab Emirates. It operates in the areas of trading and distribution; engineering, procurement and construction; exploration and production; casual dining restaurants; and manufacturing.

It is wholly owned by Rajen A. Kilachand, the Chairman and President of the group.

== History ==
The Dodsal Group was founded in Mumbai, India, in 1948 by the Nandlal Kilachand family as a trading company in partnership with a British trading company (DODWEL) and Karsa Salem. After the Kilachand family acquired Dodsal from the other partners and Rajen Kilachand took over the company, he streamlined Dodsal's various businesses to form the Dodsal Group. The group moved its headquarters from Mumbai to Dubai in 2003.

Dodsal Group and Atomenergomash (AEM), a Russian heavy equipment engineering company, signed a Memorandum of Understanding (MOU) to cooperate in manufacturing and supplying power equipment for nuclear, thermal, and oil and gas projects in India. An initial investment in the range of US$150 million was put forth, targeting the start-up of commercial production by the first quarter of 2013.

Dodsal Group acquired the Chennai-based company AE&E I.D.E.A. (India) Private Limited on 7 March 2011.
