= Thoi Singh Khangebam =

Indian footballer (born 1990)

Thoi Singh
Personal information
- Full name: Thoi Singh Khangebam
- Date of birth: 5 October 1990 (age 36)
- Place of birth: Thoubal, Manipur
- Positions: Midfielder; winger

Team information
- Current team: Calicut FC
- Number: 27

Youth career
- 2006: Indian Bank

Senior career*
Years	Team	Apps	(Gls)
2007–2010	Mahindra United	25	(8)
2010–2011	Salgaocar	8	(1)
2011–2012	United Sikkim	32	(10)
2013	Mumbai Tigers		
2013–2015	Bengaluru	37	(8)
2015–2021	Chennaiyin	71	(4)
2016	→ Bengaluru (loan)	13	(0)
2017	→ Mumbai (Loan)	13	(2)
2021–2022	Real Kashmir FC		
2022–2023	NEROCA		
2024–	Calicut FC	12	(1)

International career
2006	India U19	1	(0)
- * Club domestic league appearances and goals

Thoi Singh Khangebam (Meitei: Khangebam Thoi Singh, born 5 October 1990) is an Indian professional footballer who plays as a midfielder for Calicut FC in the Super League Kerala.

== Youth career ==
Thoi started his career when representing his state Manipur in the Mir Iqbal Hussain Trophy, a National level under-16 sub-junior trophy. Thoi signed his first professional contract with Chennai-based Indian Bank in 2006 to represent them in the I-League 2nd Division.

== Senior career ==
His performances with the southern side attracted the interest of Maharashtra-based (now defunct) Mahindra United, where he signed a 3-year contract in 2007. The highlight of his time at Mahindra includes a tournament winning goal in the final of the 2008 Durand Cup against Churchill Brothers. Thoi joined Goa-based Salgaocar in 2010 for the 2010-11 season where he won the league with Salgaocar, though only appearing 8 times and scoring once, and was predominantly used as a squad player. He accepted Bhaichung Bhutia's inviatiton to play for I-League 2nd Division team United Sikkim, where he stayed for two seasons, appearing regularly in the 2011 season and 2012 season alongside Bhutia, Renedy Singh and Sandesh Jhingan.

While United Sikkim gained promotion, Thoi's services was enlisted by newly formed Mumbai Tigers, then known as Dodsal FC for the 2013 I-League 2nd Division. Thoi became the first player to score for the Mumbai-based team when he scored against Army Red in their first professional game on 25 August 2012 at the Ambedkar Stadium in Delhi in the 2012 Durand Cup. Thoi scored twice in the tournament as Mumbai Tigers reached the final, but were beaten 3–2 on penalties by Air India.

Thoi would then be picked up by another newly formed Bangalore based team Bengaluru FC for the 2013-14 I-League. He made 21 appearances in the I-League for Bengaluru FC in the central midfield and scored thrice and helped his side win the league in their first professional season in Indian football. He would continue with Bengaluru for another season by winning the 2014-15 Federation Cup before making 16 appearances and scoring 5 times in the 2014-15 I-League as his team finished runner-up behind Mohun Bagan.

Thoi along with Robin Singh and Sunil Chhetri were contracted to the Indian Super League and will be loaned back to Bengaluru FC for the 2016 I-League season. He was picked up by Chennai-based Chennaiyin for the 2015 Indian Super League for INR 8.6 million during the 2015 ISL Auctions, making him the 3rd most expensive Indian player in the ISL only below his teammates at Bengaluru FC, Sunil Chhetri and Eugeneson Lyngdoh.

== International career ==
Thoi Singh was called up to the India U19 team for the 2006 AFC Youth Championship held in India between 29 October – 12 November 2006. He made his only appearance as a substitute against Jordan U19s playing as a forward.

== Honours ==
=== Club ===
Mahindra United

- Durand Cup: 2008

Salgaocar

- I-League: 2010-11

United Sikkim

- I-League 2nd Division: 2012

Bengaluru FC

- I-League: 2013-14
- Federation Cup: 2014-15

Chennaiyin FC

- Indian Super League: 2015
- Indian Super League: 2017–18

Real Kashmir

- IFA Shield: 2021

Calicut FC

- Super League Kerala: 2024
