= Mohammed Rafi (footballer) =

Indian footballer (born 1982)

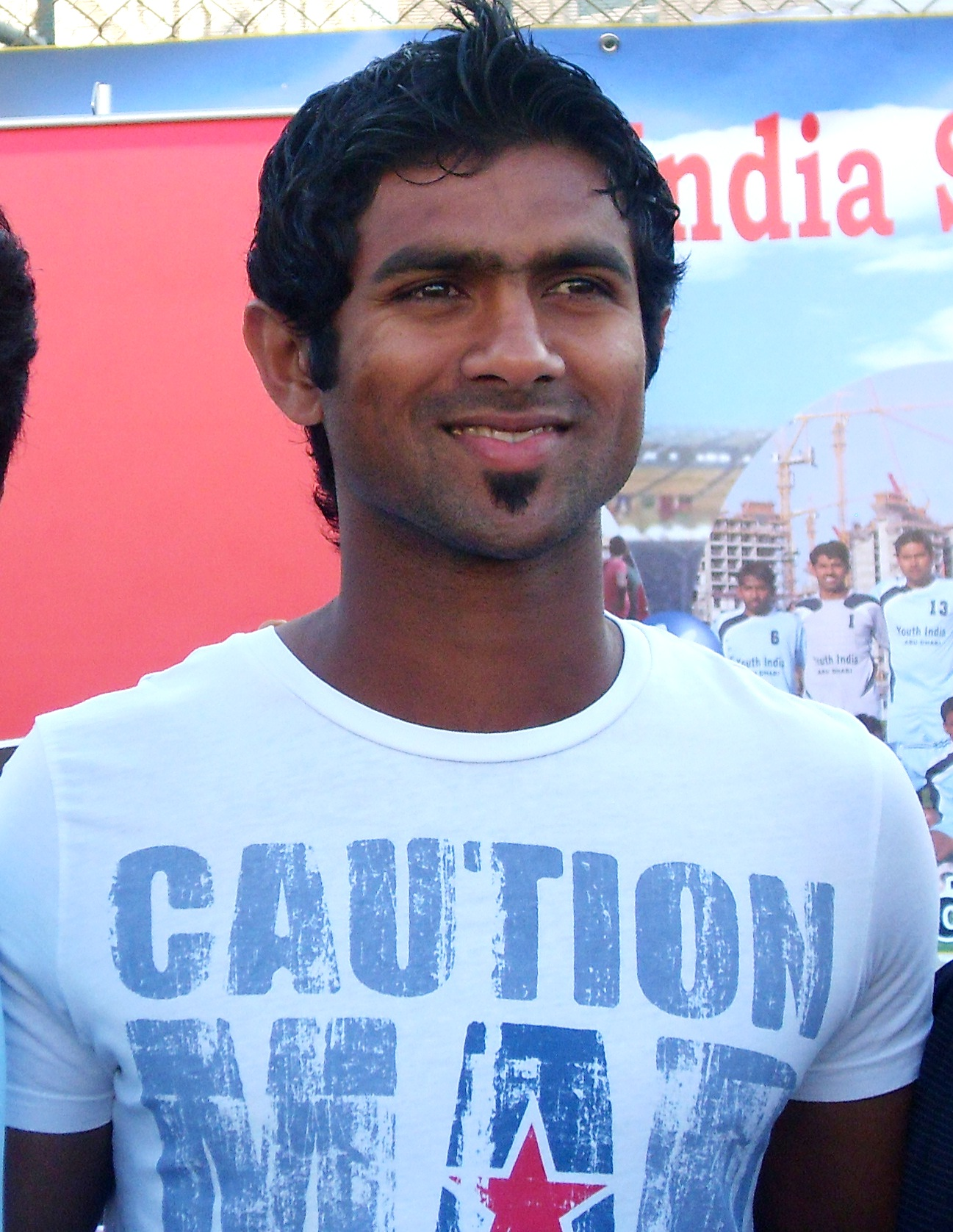
- Rafi in 2011

Personal information
- Date of birth: 24 May 1982 (age 44)
- Place of birth: Trikaripur, Kasaragod, Kerala, India
- Height: 1.78 m (5 ft 10 in)
- Position: Forward

Senior career*
Years	Team	Apps	(Gls)
2004–2005	SBT	20	(12)
2006–2010	Mahindra United	130	(107)
2010–2012	Churchill Brothers	48	(26)
2013	Mumbai Tigers	20	(3)
2013–2015	Mumbai	40	(22)
2014	→ Atletico de Kolkata (loan)	10	(0)
2015–2016	Kerala Blasters	22	(6)
2017–2019	Chennaiyin	32	(2)
2019–2020	Kerala Blasters	17	(4)

International career
2009–2011	India	3	(0)
- * Club domestic league appearances and goals

Mohammed Rafi (born 24 May 1982) is an Indian former professional footballer who played as a striker.

== Club career ==
Mohammed Rafi came through the ranks of SBT which had distinction of fielding not only all-Indian but also all-Malayali squad. SBT was promoted to first division of National Football League in 2004 and in that season he scored 4 goals and came into limelight. Unfortunately, SBT got relegated but he was roped in by Mahindra United for the next season.

In 09–10 I-league, he finished the season with record 14 goals, which is best ever for an Indian striker, he was also adjudged Mahindra United's player of the year.

Rafi's example was followed by his younger brothers Mohammad Shafi, who played for Viva Kerala FC and Mohammad Razi, with KSEB.

=== Mumbai ===
On 24 November 2013 it was announced that Rafi has signed for Mumbai on loan from IMG Reliance with three other players Khelemba Singh, N.P. Pradeep and Peter Costa. He made his debut on 2 December 2013 against East Bengal F.C. at the Balewadi Sports Complex in which he played the whole match as Mumbai won the match 3–2.

=== DSK Shivajians ===
After having a good season with Kerala Blasters in the 2015 Indian Super League season, Rafi joined DSK Shivajians, which gained a place in the league through bidding a direct entry slot, for the 2015–16 I-League season.

=== Indian Super League ===
In the inaugural season of Indian Super League (ISL), Rafi played for Atletico de Kolkata, the team owned by Sourav Ganguly and Atletico de Madrid.

Rafi was signed by Kerala Blasters FC for the second ISL season. He scored on his debut, the second goal of the match against North East United, and also set up Sanchez Watt's goal.

He won ISL Emerging Player of the Match award against NorthEast United FC in the 2015 Indian Super League.

He was again signed by Kerala Blasters FC for the third ISL season. Mohammed Rafi became the third Indian to score a goal in the ISL final 2016, following Mohammed Rafique for Atletico de Kolkata in 2014, and Thongkhosiem Haokip for FC Goa in 2015.

In ISL 2017, Rafi played for Chennaiyin FC (ISL 2015 champions). He scored a goal in his first match against NorthEast United on 23 November 2017. In the 2018–19 season, he played 8 games for Chennaiyin without scoring a league goal. However, in the 6 games he played in the AFC Cup, he scored 3 goals.

In the 2019–20 season, he rejoined Kerala Blasters. On 4 October 2020, the club officially announced the departure of the veteran from the club.

== International career ==
Rafi also represented India a number of times and scored a goal against Kuwait. HIs was the only goal as India lost that match 1–9.

=== International goals ===
Goal	Date	Venue	Opponent	Score	Result	Competition
1	14 November 2010	Al-Wahda Stadium, Abu Dhabi, U.A.E	Kuwait	1–7	1–9	Friendly

== Honours ==
=== Club ===
Atlético de Kolkata

- Indian Super League winner: 2014

Kerala Blasters

- Indian Super League runner-up: 2016

Chennaiyin FC

- Indian Super League winner: 2017–18

=== Individual ===
- 2009–10 I-League Player of The Year.
