= Pappachen Pradeep =

Indian footballer

N. P. Pradeep
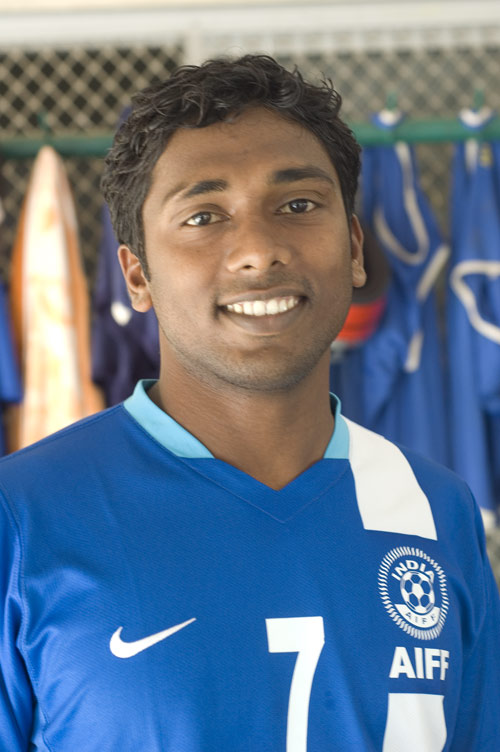

Personal information
- Full name: Naduparambil Pappachen Pradeep
- Date of birth: 28 April 1983 (age 43)
- Place of birth: Moolamattom, Idukki, Kerala, India
- Height: 1.75 m (5 ft 9 in)
- Positions: Midfielder; forward

Senior career*
Years	Team	Apps	(Gls)
2002–2006	SBT	??	(??)
2006–2010	Mahindra United	??	(??)
2010–2011	Viva Kerala	6	(4)
2011–2012	Mohun Bagan	10	(0)
2012–2013	Mumbai Tigers	10	(3)
2013–2015	Mumbai	12	(2)
2014	Chennaiyin (loan)	1	(0)
2014–2016	Mumbai	6	(0)

International career^{‡}
2004	India U20		
2006	India U23		
2005–2011	India	42	(9)
- * Club domestic league appearances and goals as of 1 June 2011 ‡ National team caps and goals as of 28 April 2017

Naduparambil Pappachen Pradeep (born 28 April 1983), commonly known as NP Pradeep, is an Indian retired professional footballer who played as an attacking midfielder. He is India's all-time most goalscoring midfielder. Pradeep hails from Moolamattom in Kerala. He was also the captain of India's U23 team. He is currently working as a Malayalam co-commentator and pundit on Star Sports network.

== Club career ==
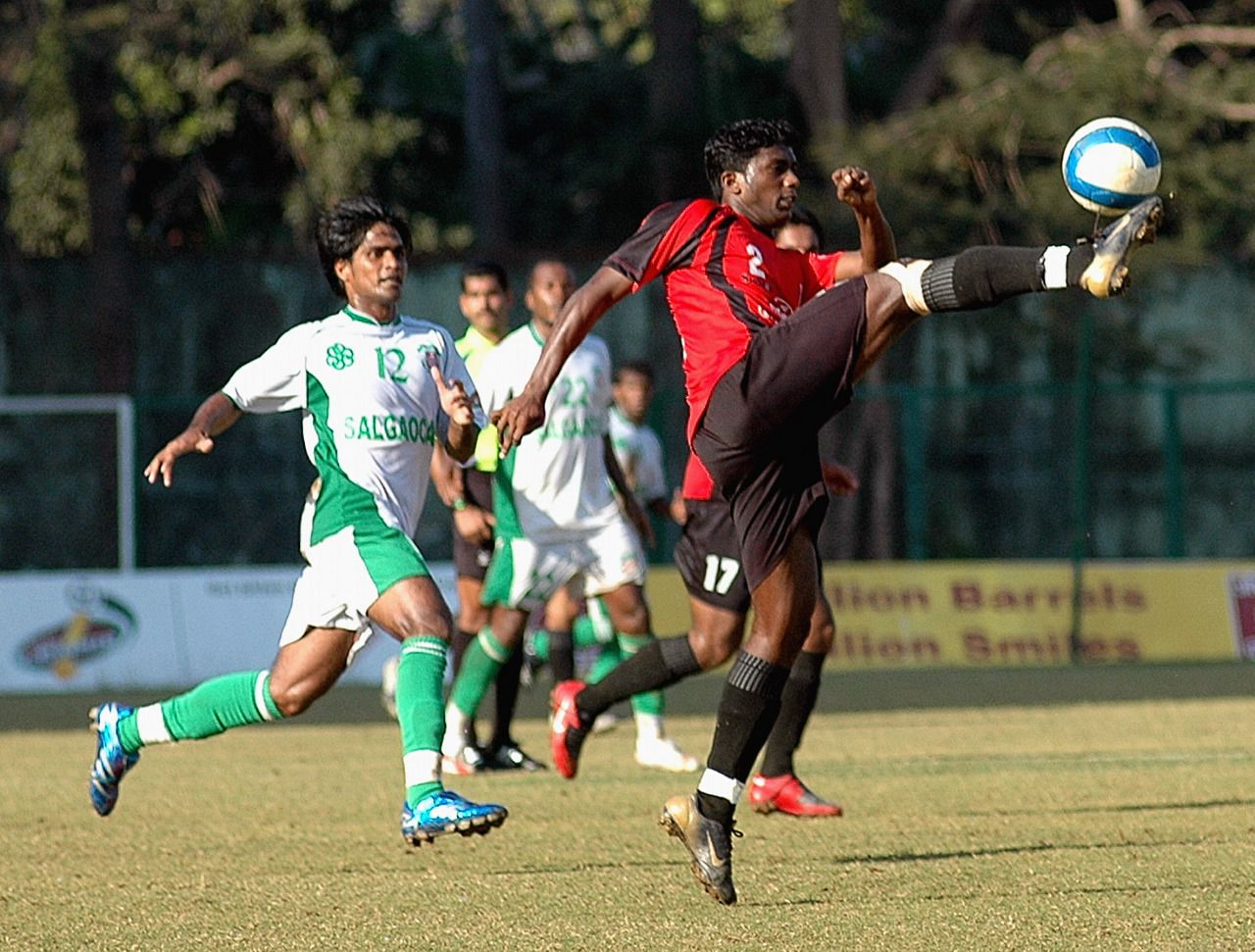
Pradeep (in red) in action during an I-League match between Salgaocar and Mahindra United

Pradeep used to play as a striker during his youth career and represented his state, Kerala, at Under-17 and Under-21 levels. At the age of 17 he signed for SBT and soon was transformed into a midfielder. He represented India at various age group levels, including the Under-20 team that reached the quarterfinals of the 2002 AFC Under-20 Championships. Pradeep continued to impress at SBT, helping them to win four Kerala League titles.

His first call up to the senior team was during the 2005 SAFF Cup in Bangladesh, which India went on to win. In 2006, Pradeep made his first big move at club level as he joined National League champions Mahindra United. There Pradeep developed a quality of being very versatile as he also at times played as a fullback. The man from Kerala also captained the India Under-20 side that reached the last eight of the 2006 AFC Challenge Cup.

He won the IFA Shield and reached the quarter-finals of the AFC Cup with Mahindra and caught the eye of newly appointed India coach Bob Houghton. Initially he was used as a left back by the English tactician but by the start of the 2007 Nehru Cup, Pradeep was in the India squad as a goal scoring midfielder. India's first goal in that competition was scored by the man from Kerala but his best moment came in the final. In 2016, he worked as a player scout for ISL side Kerala Blasters.

=== Viva Kerala FC ===
For the 2010–11 I-League season Pradeep signed with Viva Kerala and scored two goals in four games. He scored his third goal against Dempo for Viva on 8 April 2011.

=== Mohun Bagan AC ===
During the off season after the I-League 2010-11 season Pradeep signed for I-League club Mohun Bagan A.C.

=== Dodsal Football Club ===
The Indian international did not have a 2011–12 I-League season to remember as he was on the fringes of the first team at Mohun Bagan. NP Pradeep signed for Dodsal F.C. in 2012, along with the likes of Surkumar Singh and Mohammed Rafi. It is also said that head coach Bimal Ghosh and his liking for the city of Mumbai were the two main reasons for him choosing to sign up with the second-tier I-League side.

On 6 April 2013, he scored a 2nd-minute goal at Bangalore against Rangdajied United F.C., though the Tigers lost the match 1–3.

=== Mumbai FC ===
On 24 November 2013 it was announced that Pradeep has signed for Mumbai on loan from IMG Reliance with three other players Khelemba Singh, Mohammed Rafi and Peter Costa. He made his debut on 2 December 2013 against East Bengal F.C. at the Balewadi Sports Complex in which he scored a goal in 65th minute and played till the 76th minute before being replaced by Sandjar Ahmadi as Mumbai won the match 3–2.

== International career ==
Pradeep played in multiple roles throughout his career. He is all-time top goalscoring midfielder for India who as an attacking midfielder and has often scored scorching long rangers. He has played for India in the AFC Asia Cup 2007 qualifiers and scored a goal against Yemen. Pradeep has also represented India in the Vancouver Whitecaps Invitational in 2006 scoring a goal there as well. He played extremely well in India's exposure trip to Portugal in 2007 where they played Portuguese club sides. His most memorable performance was perhaps in the Nehru Cup 2007 where he scored two stunning goals, including the goal in the finals versus Syria which won India the cup. Incidentally he opened and also closed the scoring in the Nehru Cup 2007. Since then Pradeep has been a regular in the first eleven of the senior national team, helping them to win two more trophies. In the Asian Cup 2011 Pradeep played a vital defensive role for India. Despite his efforts India crashed out of the Asian Cup after three defeats in the group stage.

=== International goals ===
Scores and results list India's goal tally first.

Goal	Date	Venue	Opponent	Score	Result	Competition
1	15 November 2006	Ali Mohsen Stadium, Sanaa, Yemen	Yemen	1–0	1–2	2007 AFC Asian Cup qualification
2	17 August 2007	Ambedkar Stadium, Delhi, India	Cambodia	1–0	6–0	2007 Nehru Cup
3	29 August 2007	Ambedkar Stadium, Delhi, India	Syria	1–0	1–0	2007 Nehru Cup
4	24 May 2008	Fatorda Stadium, Goa, India	Chinese Taipei	1–0	3–0	Friendly
5	27 May 2008	Nehru Stadium, Chennai, India	Chinese Taipei	1–1	2–2	Friendly
6	27 May 2008	Nehru Stadium, Chennai, India	Chinese Taipei	2–2	2–2	Friendly
7	3 June 2008	Rasmee Dhandu Stadium, Malé, Maldives	Nepal	1–0	4–0	2008 SAFF Cup
8	5 June 2008	Rasmee Dhandu Stadium, Malé, Maldives	Pakistan	1–0	2–1	2008 SAFF Cup
9	8 September 2010	Ambedkar Stadium, Delhi, India	Thailand	1–1	1–2	Friendly

== Honours ==
India

- AFC Challenge Cup: 2008
- SAFF Championship: 2005; runner-up: 2008
- Nehru Cup: 2007, 2009

India U20

- South Asian Games Silver medal: 2004

== Personal life ==
After retiring from football, Pradeep worked as a scout for Reliance Foundation Young Champs (RFYC).
