= N. Karthik =

Indian Tamil politician

N. Karthik (1 June 1964) is an Indian Tamil politician and a Member of the Legislative Assembly. He won the 2016 Tamil Nadu Legislative Assembly Elections representing DMK in Singanallur.

== Electoral history ==
Year	Constituency	Party	Votes Secured	Result	Vote %
2016	Singanallur	DMK	75,459	Won	40.02%
