= Gagandeep Singh (footballer) =

Indian footballer (born 1985)

Personal information
- Date of birth: 2 November 1985 (age 40)
- Place of birth: India
- Height: 1.72 m (5 ft 8 in)
- Position: Defender

Team information
- Current team: Mohammedan
- Number: 18

Senior career*
| Years | Team | Apps | (Gls) |
- Salgaocar
| 2012–2013 | Air India | 22 | (1) |
| 2013– | Mohammedan | 4 | (0) |
- * Club domestic league appearances and goals

Gagandeep Singh (born 2 November 1985) is an Indian footballer who plays as a defender for Mohammedan S.C.

== Career ==
=== Air India ===
Mr.Singh made his debut for Air India F.C. on 20 September 2012 during a Federation Cup match against Mohammedan at the Kanchenjunga Stadium in Siliguri, West Bengal in which he started the match; Air India lost the match 0–1.

=== Mohammedan ===
Singh made his debut for Mohammedan in the I-League on 21 September 2013 against Pune at the Salt Lake Stadium and played the whole match; as Mohammedan lost the match 1–3.

== Career statistics ==
=== Club ===
Statistics accurate as of 27 October 2013

| Club | Season | League | | Federation Cup | | Durand Cup | | AFC | | Total | |
| Club | Season | Apps | Goals | Apps | Goals | Apps | Goals | Apps | Goals | Apps | Goals |
|---|---|---|---|---|---|---|---|---|---|---|---|
| Air India | 2012–13 | 22 | 1 | 2 | 0 | 0 | 0 | - | - | 24 | 1 |
| Mohammedan | 2013-14 | 4 | 0 | 0 | 0 | 0 | 0 | - | - | 4 | 0 |
| Career total | | 26 | 1 | 2 | 0 | 0 | 0 | 0 | 0 | 28 | 1 |
