= Souvik Chakrabarti =

Indian footballer (born 1991)

- Chakrabarti with Mohun Bagan in 2017

Personal information
- Full name: Souvik Chakrabarti
- Date of birth: 12 July 1991 (age 35)
- Place of birth: Kolkata, West Bengal, India
- Height: 1.72 m (5 ft 8 in)
- Positions: Midfielder; right back

Team information
- Current team: East Bengal
- Number: 23

Youth career
- Mohun Bagan

Senior career*
Years	Team	Apps	(Gls)
2009–2012	Mohun Bagan	37	(6)
2012–2013	Air India	24	(2)
2013–2014	Prayag United	22	(0)
2014–2017	Mohun Bagan	41	(0)
2014	→ Delhi Dynamos (loan)	7	(0)
2015	→ Delhi Dynamos (loan)	12	(0)
2016	→ Delhi Dynamos (loan)	16	(0)
2017–2018	Jamshedpur	18	(0)
2018–2020	Mumbai City	25	(1)
2020–2022	Hyderabad	26	(0)
2022–	East Bengal	80	(1)
- * Club domestic league appearances and goals as of 13:24, 18 June 2024 (UTC)

Souvik Chakrabarti (Bengali: সৌভিক চক্রবর্তী; born 12 July 1991), is an Indian professional footballer who plays as a midfielder or defender for Indian Super League club East Bengal.

== Career ==
=== Mohun Bagan ===
Chakraborty started playing football at the age of eight at the Yubajagaran football coaching centre. He then joined the Mohun Bagan Academy when he was 15 years old where he recalls his most memorable moment there, the Manchester United Premier Cup in Manchester, England. Chakraborty was then selected to join the first-team for the 2009–10 Indian Federation Cup and the Calcutta Football League. His call-up to the senior team was made possible due to the rule that each club in the Calcutta Football League must have two under-19 players in the squad. Chakraborty had to wait until 2 November 2011 before making his professional debut for the club against Dempo at the Fatorda Stadium in which Mohun Bagan lost 5–0, coming on as a 26th-minute substitute for Anwar Ali.

=== Air India ===
In the summer of 2012 Chakraborty signed for Air India of the I-League and scored his first professional goal of his career for the club on 28 August 2012 against Pailan Arrows during the 2012 Durand Cup. He made his I-League debut for Air India on 7 October 2012 against Prayag United S.C. in which Air India lost 5–1. He scored his second goal for Air India in the I-League against Shillong Lajong on 16 December 2012 to give Air India the lead 1–0 before the match ended 1–1 after Lajong found an equalizer.

=== United Sports Club ===
Souvik made his debut on 6 October 2013 against Bengaluru at the Salt Lake Stadium in which he played till 61minutes and was replaced by Snehasish Chakraborty as United lost the match 1–0.

=== Mohun Bagan ===
In January 2014, Chakraborty signed for Kolkata giant Mohun Bagan. A Mohun Bagan Academy product, he is very much a mariner at heart. Having devoted his life to football, Souvik has turned into a master passer and crosser of the ball. A good passer, crosser, and modern box to box midfielder, Souvik was a vital cog in Bagan's I-League triumph in 2014–15 season. On 21 May 2016, Souvik started on the right of midfield in Mohun Bagan's 2016 Indian Federation Cup final victory over Aizawl FC before being substituted in the 88th minute. On 28 February 2017, Souvik started as the captain for the first time for Mohun Bagan in the AFC Cup against Club Valencia.

==== Delhi Dynamos (loan) ====
In August 2014, Delhi based ISL franchisee Delhi Dynamos signed him in domestic draft. He made total 7 ISL appearances for Delhi Dynamos in first season, but Delhi finished fifth in final League table.

In June 2015, Delhi Dynamos retained him for next season ISL along with 4 more players. He is highly rated by Roberto Carlos in Delhi Dynamos where he played almost all matches for a right back for Delhi dynamos in 2015 season. He helped Delhi to reach semi final, in which Delhi lost 3–1 to FC Goa.

In July 2016, Delhi Dynamos again retained him for next season ISL for the third straight time. Delhi Dynamos sent Souvik to A-League club Central Coast Mariners for a week long training camp. Delhi Dynamos head coach Gianluca Zambrotta rated Souvik a versatile player and used him as a left back in entire season. Souvik started all matches for Delhi Dynamos in 2016 campaign.

=== Jamshedpur ===
On 23 July 2017, Chakraborty was selected in the fourth round of the 2017–18 ISL Players Draft by Jamshedpur for the 2017–18 Indian Super League. He made his debut for the club during the first ever match on 18 November 2017 against NorthEast United. He started and played the whole match as Jamshedpur drew 0–0.

== Career statistics ==
=== Club ===
As of 29 October 2024

Club	Season	League			Cup		AFC		Total	
Club	Season	Division	Apps	Goals	Apps	Goals	Apps	Goals	Apps	Goals
Air India	2012–13	I-League	24	2	5 (Note: Appearance(s) in Federation Cup) (Note: Appearance(s) in Durand Cup)	1	—		29	3
Prayag United	2013–14	I-League	22	0	0	0	—		22	0
Mohun Bagan	2014–15	I-League	15	0	4	0	—		19	0
Mohun Bagan	2015–16	I-League	13	0	5	0	6 (Note: Appearance(s) in AFC Champions League) (Note: Appearance(s) in AFC Cup)	0	24	0
Mohun Bagan	2016–17	I-League	13	0	5	0	6	0	24	0
Mohun Bagan	Mohun Bagan total		41	0	14	0	12	0	67	0
Delhi Dynamos (loan)	2014	Indian Super League	7	0	0	0	—		7	0
Delhi Dynamos (loan)	2015	Indian Super League	12	0	0	0	—		12	0
Delhi Dynamos (loan)	2016	Indian Super League	16	0	0	0	—		16	0
Delhi Dynamos (loan)	Delhi Dynamos total		35	0	0	0	0	0	35	0
Jamshedpur	2017–18	Indian Super League	18	0	0	0	—		18	0
Mumbai City	2018–19	Indian Super League	18	0	1 (Note: Appearance(s) in Super Cup)	0	—		19	0
Mumbai City	2019–20	Indian Super League	7	1	0	0	—		7	1
Mumbai City	Mumbai City total		25	1	1	0	0	0	26	1
Hyderabad	2019–20	Indian Super League	3	0	0	0	—		3	0
Hyderabad	2020–21	Indian Super League	7	0	0	0	—		7	0
Hyderabad	2021–22	Indian Super League	16	0	0	0	—		16	0
Hyderabad	Hyderabad total		26	0	0	0	0	0	26	0
East Bengal	2022–23	Indian Super League	5	0	4	0	—		9	0
East Bengal	2023–24	Indian Super League	19	0	9	0	—		28	0
East Bengal	2024–25	Indian Super League	0	0	0	0	—		0	0
East Bengal	East Bengal total		24	0	13	0	0	0	37	0
Career total			215	3	29	0	12	0	252	4

== Honours ==
Air India

- Durand Cup: 2012

Mohun Bagan

- I-League: 2014–15
- Federation Cup: 2015–16

Hyderabad

- Indian Super League: 2021–22

East Bengal

- Indian Super League: 2025-26
- Super Cup: 2024
