= Mumbai Tigers FC =

Former Indian association football club

Mumbai Tigers
- Full name: Mumbai Tigers Football Club
- Founded: 2012; 14 years ago (as Dodsal FC)
- Dissolved: 2014; 12 years ago
- Owner: Dodsal Group
- Chairman: Rajen Kilachand
- Manager: Bimal Ghosh
- League: I-League 2nd Division
- 2013: First Season

Mumbai Tigers Football Club (formerly known as Dodsal FC) was an Indian professional football club based in Mumbai, Maharashtra. The club were formed in May 2012 as Dodsal Football Club with the aim of becoming the biggest football club in India and one of the biggest in Asia. They have completed in the I-League 2nd Division alongside Mumbai Football League.

== History ==
Towards the end of May 2012 it was announced that Indian owned company Dodsal Group wanted to start a football club in the city of Mumbai and name it Dodsal Football Club. The club registered with the Mumbai District Football Association and quickly outlined that their main goal would be to qualify for the I-League, which is India's top football competition, by 2013. The club is supposed to be run in the same way Manchester City F.C. of the Premier League is run, as company chairman Rajen Kilachand is in touch with City owner Sheikh Mansour.

On 18 August 2012, it was announced that Dodsal would play in the 2012 Durand Cup and thus their first ever professional tournament at the national stage. The club played their first ever official game on 25 August 2012 against Army Red at the Ambedkar Stadium in Delhi in which the club won the match 3–0 with Thoi Singh becoming the first player to ever score for the club in the 66th minute. The club then went on to the 2012 Durand Cup Final in which they lost 3–2 on penalties to then-current I-League club Air India FC.

In January 2013, it was officially announced that the club would participate in the 2013 I-League 2nd Division with the goal of winning and gaining promotion to the I-League and while doing so the club also changed their name to the Mumbai Tigers Football Club so they could potentially form a connection between them and the city of Mumbai. Tigers gained direct entry to the I-League by bidding for a spot but a week before the 2013–14 season began they pulled out of the league and shut their senior team operations.

== Stadium ==
The club do not have an official stadium yet as the Mumbai Football League and the Durand Cup are played at neutral venues but the club has already set up a training ground at the Fr. Angel High School sports complex. The Sports Complex is well known for its artificial turf field. The Sports Complex is also known for its fitness gym and swimming pool.

== Last registered squad ==
As of 26 Dec 2013.

Note: Flags indicate national team as defined under FIFA eligibility rules; some limited exceptions apply. Players may hold more than one non-FIFA nationality.

| No. | Pos. | Nation | Player |
|---|---|---|---|
| 4 | MF | IND | Henry Gangte |
| 5 | DF | IND | Rahul Kumar |
| 7 | FW | SEN | Demba Diakhaté |
| 8 | DF | IND | Rabindra Ghosh |
| 12 | DF | IND | Loukik Jadhav |
| 16 | DF | IND | Sunil Kumar |

| No. | Pos. | Nation | Player |
|---|---|---|---|
| — | GK | IND | Prasenjit Ghosh |
| — | DF | IND | Ningthoujam Samananda |
| — | DF | IND | Anthony Fernandes |
| — | MF | IND | Royston Dsouza |
| — | MF | IND | Chhangte Malsawmkima |
| — | MF | IND | Pradeep Mohanraj |
| — | MF | IND | Abhishek Ambedkar |
| — | GK | IND | Arnab Das Sharma |
| — | FW | IND | Pritam Singh |
| — | MF | IND | S Sanju Kumar |
| — | MF | IND | Raju Sohail Haque |

== Honours ==
=== Cup tournaments ===
- Durand Cup
  - Runners-up (1): 2012
- Nadkarni Cup
  - Champions (2): 2012, 2013
- Kalina MLA Cup
  - Runners-up (1): 2013

== See also ==
- List of football clubs in India
- Sports in Maharashtra
