= Delhi United FC =

Indian association football club based in Delhi

Delhi United
- Full name: Delhi United Football Club
- Nickname: Delhi-Red
- Founded: 1995; 31 years ago
- Ground: Ambedkar Stadium
- Capacity: 35,000
- Owner: United Soccer Pvt. Ltd.
- Chairman: Krishna Anand Tripathi
- Head coach: Ayush Bhuttan
- League: FD A-Division
- Website: delhiunitedfc.com
Home colours	Away colours

Delhi United FC (formerly Delhi United Soccer Club) is an Indian professional football club based in New Delhi, that competes in the FD A-Division. They play most of their home games at Ambedkar Stadium.

The club also operate a youth football academy, headquartered in Dwarka.

== History ==
Delhi United Football Club, earlier named as Gorkha Heroes, was founded in 1995 by Lal Bahadur Basnet. The club is affiliated with Football Delhi (also known as Delhi Soccer Association). Gorkha Heroes were playing in lower division of DSA League till 2007, until B. S. Mehra took over the club management. In 2007, Gorkha Heroes became champions of B Division without losing a single match, and got promoted to A Division. Their superb form continued as they were crowned overall champions in 2008–09, keeping unbeaten record intact.

In 2009, the name was changed to Delhi United FC. In Senior Division 2009–10 season, they defeated City FC with a score of 13–0 in a match which is still the highest scoring game in Delhi's top flight. In 2010–11, the club focused its attention to I-League 2nd Division and strengthened their squad by signing some top Delhi players. Their hard work finally paid off and they became champions of the Senior Division by defeating Shahdara FC in final with a score of 3–2. Delhi United gave the best performance in Durand Cup 2012, qualifying for quarterfinals by defeating Indian Navy and Army Green in qualifying rounds. Winning the Senior Division finally confirmed their participation in I-League 2nd Division for the 2012–13 campaign. They performed well in the I-League's second tier and were the best team from North India.

Delhi United again participated in I-League 2nd Division in 2016–17 season, and secured third spot in the final round. Ahead of the 2017–18 I-League 2nd Division season, they roped in Portuguese manager Hugo Martins. Their campaign ended in the Group stages after finishing fourth with 9 points. In 2018, the club took part in J&K Invitational Cup in Srinagar.

=== I-League ===
On 21 September 2018, it was revealed that both Mumbai FC and Delhi United FC had submitted documents for direct-entry into the I-League. On 27 January 2020, a Delhi-based fan club of former Indian Super League outfit Delhi Dynamos, Dynamos Ultras were handed over operational activities of the club. Aditya Raghav was appointed as the new team manager, and Ayush Bhuttan was appointed as the new head coach. Under the new management, club played 3 matches, before season was put on hold due to coronavirus pandemic outbreak.

== Stadium ==
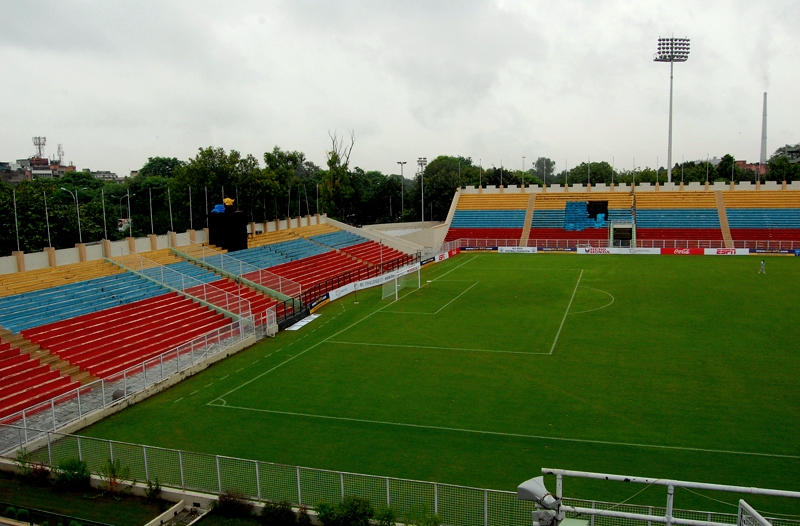
Ambedkar Stadium

Ambedkar Stadium in Delhi used to be the clubs' home ground for the DSA Senior Division. It has also hosted I-League 2nd Division matches for the club. It has a capacity of 30,000 spectators.

== Players ==
=== First team squad ===
As of 1 March 2020

Note: Flags indicate national team as defined under FIFA eligibility rules; some limited exceptions apply. Players may hold more than one non-FIFA nationality.

No.	Pos.	Nation	Player
1	GK	IND	Varun Bisht
2	DF	IND	Ayush Tiwari
3	DF	IND	Rounak Jadhav
4	DF	IND	Prince Kumar Singh
5	DF	IND	Satyam Vivek
6	MF	IND	Satriya Bakshi
7	DF	IND	Ayush Bhuttan
8	MF	IND	Rohit Patwal
9	FW	IND	Jatin Vashisht
10	MF	IND	Dishant Negi
11	MF	IND	Milind Negi
12	FW	IND	Yashvardhan
13	DF	IND	Abhay Singh Dalpatia
14	MF	IND	Rahul Rawat (Captain)
15	MF	IND	Pema Chering
17	MF	IND	Rohit Gusain
18	MF	IND	Snehal Chhetri
19	DF	IND	Anupam Thakur
20	FW	IND	Hitesh Bisht
22	GK	IND	Vishesh Upreti
23	FW	IND	Asif Khan

No.	Pos.	Nation	Player
25	MF	IND	Aditya Rampal
29	FW	IND	Pratham
31	MF	IND	Aditya Rawat
42	MF	IND	Dhananjay
43	FW	IND	Lenjing Panyang
44	MF	IND	Jagdishwar Reddy
45	MF	IND	Prince Kujur
46	DF	IND	Seivanglen Mate
47	MF	IND	Shantanu Sindhu
48	DF	IND	Sidhant Mishra
49	FW	IND	Stanzin Nyantak
50	DF	IND	Vrind Bhardwaj
51	DF	IND	Thangmoitelien
61	DF	IND	Promil
70	FW	IND	Abhishek
77	GK	IND	Vishu Kashyap
80	FW	IND	Angeluis
88	DF	IND	Jatin Singh
90	MF	IND	Mayank Rawat
99	GK	IND	Dinesh Choudhary
200	FW	IND	K.S. Shikhar

== Kit manufacturers and shirt sponsors ==
Period	Kit manufacturer	Shirt sponsor
2020—2021	Astro	Dynamos Ultras

== Current staff ==
As of 9 February 2020

Position	Name
Owner	(India) Krishnanand Tripathi
Head coach	(India) Ayush Bhuttan
Team manager	(India) Aditya Raghav
Technical director	(India) Varun Batra

=== Managerial record ===
updated on 7 April 2020

Name	Nationality	From	To	P	W	D	L	GF	GA	Win%			
Clebson Duarte Da Silva	Brazil	2016	2017	15	5	6	4	17	20	33.33			
Hugo Martins	Portugal	2018	2019 {{WDL|15	India	2020	present	3	1	1	1	7	5	33.33

== Honours ==
- I-League 2nd Division
  - Third place (1): 2016–17
- Gyalyum Chenmo Memorial Gold Cup
  - Runners-up (1): 2007

== See also ==
- List of football clubs in Delhi
