= List of Pune FC players =

This list comprises all players who have participated in at least one match for Pune F.C. since the team's first I-League season in 2009. Players who were on the roster but never played a first team game are not listed.

== A ==
- (India) Krishnan Nair Ajayan
- (India) Mumtaz Akhtar
- (England) Calum Angus
- (India) Ayan Shahi

== B ==
- (India) Nicolau Borges

== C ==
- (India) Caitano Costa

== D ==
- (India) Arup Debnath
- (India) Anthony D'Souza

== E ==
- (India) Anas Edathodika

== F ==
- (Equatorial Guinea) Raúl Fabiani
- (India) Gabriel Fernandes
- (India) Selwyn Fernandes
- (India) Lester Fernandez
- (Brazil) Edmar Figueira
- (India) Godwin Franco

== G ==
- (India) Dhanpal Ganesh
- (Trinidad and Tobago) Cyd Gray

== H ==
- (India) Thongkhosiem Haokip
- (India) Asim Hassan
- (India) Rollingson Hungyo

== I ==
- (India) Arata Izumi

== K ==
- (India) Nikhil Kadam
- (Senegal) Boima Karpeh
- (Guinea) Mandjou Keita
- (India) Gurjinder Kumar
- (India) Kamaljeet Kumar
- (India) Rahul Kumar
- (India) Sampath Kuttymani

== L ==
- (India) Jeje Lalpekhlua
- (India) Fanai Lalrempuia

== M ==
- (India) Nanjangud Shivananju Manju
- (India) Denechandra Meitei
- (India) Shahinlal Meloly
- (Australia) James Meyer
- (South Sudan) James Moga
- (India) Abhra Mondal
- (Netherlands) Riga Mustapha

== N ==
- (India) Balaji Narasimhan
- (Japan) Daisuke Nishiguchi
- (Montenegro) Darko Nikač

== P ==
- (India) Subrata Pal
- (Ivory Coast) Douhou Pierre
- (India) Jayashelan Prasad

== R ==
- (India) Zohmingliana Ralte
- (India) Srikanth Ramu
- (India) Velington Rocha

== S ==
- (India) Paresh Shivalkar
- (India) Amrinder Singh
- (India) Baldeep Singh
- (India) Maninder Singh
- (India) Salam Ranjan Singh
- (India) Subhash Singh

== T ==
- (India) Othallo Tabia
- (Senegal) Lamine Tamba
- (India) Prakash Thorat
- (India) Karma Tsewang

== V ==
- (India) Shanmugam Venkatesh
- (India) Gunashekar Vignesh

== W ==
- (Nigeria) Chika Wali
- (India) Jeh Williamson

== Z ==
- (India) Nawab Zeeshan
