= 2013–14 Pune FC season =

Indian football club season

Pune
2013–14 season
- Chairmen: Nandan Piramal
- Head coach: Mike Snoei
- Ground: Balewadi Sports Complex
- I-League: 3rd
- Federation Cup: Group
- Durand Cup: Group
- AFC Champions League: Qualifiers - Round 1
- AFC Cup: Group
- Top goalscorer: League: Mustapha (5 Goals); All: Mustapha (6 Goals)
Home colours	Away colours	Third colours

The 2013–14 Pune F.C. season is the club's fifth season in I-League, the top flight of Indian football and the seventh season in the club's entire history. This season will also see the club participate in Asia's top footballing competition, the AFC Champions League, in 2014 after India was awarded a spot in the tournament qualifiers and the club were announced as the best club in India to complete the club licensing requirements set by the All India Football Federation.

Former Netherlands international player and former Vitesse Arnhem manager Mike Snoei was hired to be the head coach of the club following the resignation of Derrick Pereira.

== Background ==
Pune began the 2012–13 campaign with hope. The club came into the season having lost some of their better players, including Subrata Pal, Baldeep Singh, and Lester Fernandez. The club also lost their top scorer from the previous season in former Guinea international Mandjou Keita. However, the club was able to make up for those loses with the signings of Abhra Mondal and James Moga. With these players added to the squad, Pune went into the 2012–13 I-League season with a bang, beating ONGC 3–2 on the opening day of the season. Then, after defeating Pailan Arrows on 9 November 2012, the club went on a nine-game unbeaten streak which eventually allowed the club to finish the season in second place, their best ever finish in the I-League to date.

== Pre-season ==
=== Player movement ===
After the 2012–13 season ended, Pune did not make many major changes to the squad. The club did let go three of their four foreigners in Chika Wali, Boima Karpeh, and club top scorer James Moga. All three players subsequently signed for other I-League clubs with Wali signing for Salgaocar, Karpeh joining Sporting Goa, and Moga joining East Bengal. The club's number 1 goalkeeper from last season, Abhra Mondal, also left the club to join East Bengal. In addition to Mondal, the club also lost Subhash Singh, Karma Tsewang, and Nallappan Mohanraj to Shillong Lajong, Salgaocar, and Mumbai Tigers respectively. The club also lost their first ever signing in Jeje Lalpekhlua who decided to sign for former I-League champions, Dempo.

Air India forward Prakash Thorat was the first player signed by Pune for the new season. The club then proceeded to sign both Anthony D'Souza and Arup Debnath respectively from Salgaocar and Mumbai Tigers. The club then went on to sign three new foreigners to replace the three that left the club. The first to arrive was Equatorial Guinea international Raúl Fabiani. The second foreign signing for Pune came only two days later with the signing of Calum Angus from Swedish Superettan side GAIS. Then the third and final foreign signing for Pune before the season began was former A-Leaguer James Meyer who last played for the Brisbane Roar. Then, before the I-League season began, Pune signed up four players from their academy with Denechandra Meitei, Salam Ranjan Singh, Thongkhosiem Haokip, and Gobin Singh all earning promotions to the senior squad.

After the season began, Pune did make a change in their squad with Raúl Fabiani being released from the side and former Premier League and Bolton Wanderers player Riga Mustapha being brought in as a replacement. The club made further changes to their squad in January 2014 with the signings of Gabriel Fernandes, Nicolau Borges, and Nawab Zeeshan being announced. Fernandes comes on loan from Dempo while Borges comes on loan from Mohun Bagan.

Then, on 18 February 2014, the club announced that they had re-signed former Fans' Player of the Year Lester Fernandez for the rest of the season.

==== In ====
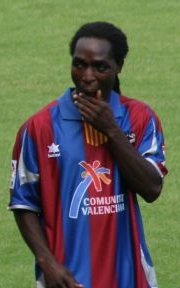
Former Bolton Wanderers player Riga Mustapha joined Pune in October 2013.

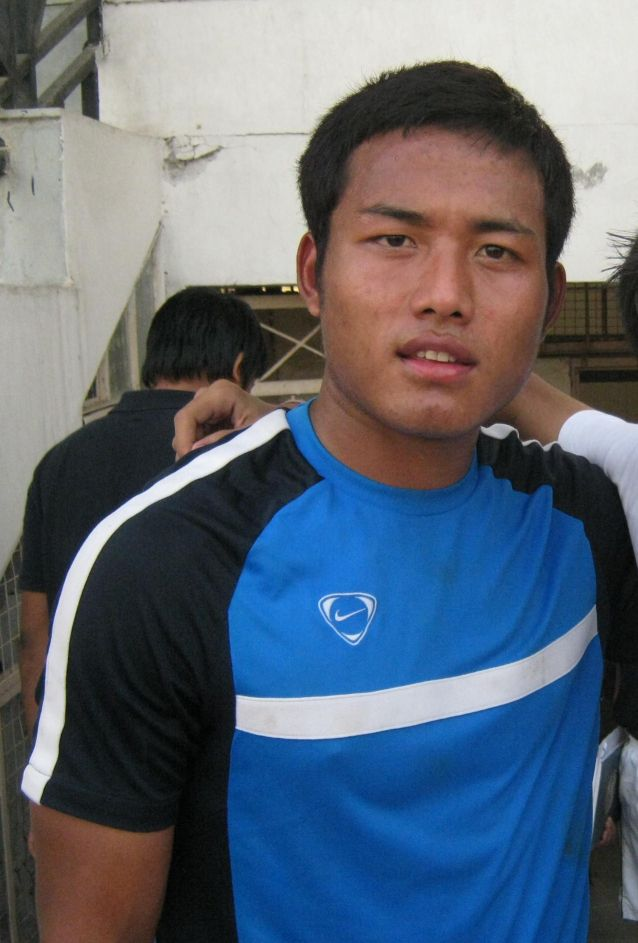
Pune's first ever signing, Jeje Lalpekhlua left the club in June 2013.

No.	Position	Player	Last played for	Fee	Date	Ref
20	FW	(India) Prakash Thorat	Air India	Free	7 June 2013	
21	MF	(India) Anthony D'Souza	(India) Salgaocar	Free	15 July 2013	
22	GK	(India) Arup Debnath	(India) Mumbai Tigers	Free	31 July 2013	
—	FW	(Equatorial Guinea) Raúl Fabiani	(Spain) Huracán	Free	5 August 2013	
4	DF	(England) Calum Angus	(Sweden) GAIS	Free	7 August 2013	
10	FW	(Australia) James Meyer	(Australia) Brisbane Roar	Free	13 August 2013	
14	DF	(India) Denechandra Meitei	Academy	—	19 September 2013	
24	DF	(India) Salam Ranjan Singh	Academy	—	19 September 2013	
28	FW	(India) Thongkhosiem Haokip	Academy	—	19 September 2013	
29	DF	(India) Gobin Singh	Academy	—	19 September 2013	
7	FW	(Netherlands) Riga Mustapha	(Spain) Cartagena	Free	26 October 2013	
12	DF	(India) Nicolau Borges	(India) Mohun Bagan	Loan	13 January 2014	
18	DF	(India) Nawab Zeeshan	(India) Mumbai Tigers	Free	13 January 2014	
30	MF	(India) Gabriel Fernandes	(India) Dempo	Loan	13 January 2014	
31	MF	(India) Lester Fernandez	(India) Mumbai Tigers	Free	18 February 2014	

==== Out ====
Position	Player	Moved to	Fee	Date	Ref
MF	(India) Subhash Singh	(India) Shillong Lajong	Free	18 May 2013	
MF	(India) Karma Tsewang	(India) Salgaocar	Free	19 May 2013	
DF	(Nigeria) Chika Wali	(India) Salgaocar	Free	19 May 2013	
FW	(Australia) Boima Karpeh	(India) Sporting Goa	Free	1 June 2013	
GK	(India) Abhra Mondal	(India) East Bengal	Free	6 June 2013	
FW	(South Sudan) James Moga	(India) East Bengal	Free	13 June 2013	
FW	(India) Jeje Lalpekhlua	(India) Dempo	Free	15 June 2013	
DF	(India) Nallappan Mohanraj	(India) Mumbai Tigers	Free	26 June 2013	
MF	(India) Sukhwinder Singh	None	Free	9 July 2013	
FW	(Equatorial Guinea) Raúl Fabiani	(Spain) Huracán Valencia CF	Free	26 October 2013	
FW	(Australia) James Meyer	None	Free	1 December 2013	

=== Matches ===
The club began their pre-season campaign with new coach Mike Snoei in Goa. The club drew their first two matches against SESA Football Academy and Laxmi Prasad before beating Churchill Brothers 2–0 thanks to a double from Raúl Fabiani. In their next match, Pune defeated league-rivals Mumbai F.C. at the Balewadi Sports Complex in which strikes from James Meyer, Fabiani, and Zohmingliana Ralte earned the side a 3–0 victory. Then in their final match of pre-season, Pune defeated Deccan XI 2–0 thanks to strikes from Dhanpal Ganesh and Shanmugam Venkatesh.

Results

Friendly	SESA F.A.	0 – 0	Pune	Goa
		Report

Friendly	Laxmi Prasad	0 – 0	Pune	Goa
		Report

14 August 2013 Friendly	Churchill Brothers	0 – 2	Pune	Goa
		Report	Fabiani 24', 25'

7 September 2013 Friendly	Pune	3 – 0	Mumbai	Pune, Maharashtra
	Meyer 28'; Fabiani 54'; Ralte 87'	Report		Stadium: Balewadi Sports Complex

14 September 2013 Friendly	Pune	2 – 0	Deccan XI	Pune, Maharashtra
	Ganesh 32'; Venkatesh 35'	Report		Stadium: Balewadi Sports Complex

== I-League ==
=== Summary ===
Pune set out for their first ever I-League title in style with a victory away from home in round one of the 2013–14 I-League season against Mohammedan. Debut goals from Raúl Fabiani, who scored a brace, and James Meyer helped Pune to 3–1 victory at the Salt Lake Stadium. Josimar was the scorer for Mohammedan. Pune then suffered a goalless draw in their second match of the season against Shillong Lajong on 29 September 2013 at the Jawaharlal Nehru Stadium.

Pune then began what would be a home-only month of October in which all their matches that month would be played at home. The first of the three matches occurred on 10 October against Mohun Bagan. Pune managed to come out on top in that match 2–0 thanks to goals from academy product Thongkhosiem Haokip and foreign import James Meyer. The second match then occurred nine-days later on 19 October against the defending champions from the 2012–13 season Churchill Brothers. Despite that fact, Pune were able to come out of the match with a victory thanks to a 52nd-minute goal from Calum Angus, his first for the club. Then, the third and final match of the month came on 27 October against newly promoted Rangdajied United in which a 29th-minute goal from Angus lead Pune to a 1–0 victory. The victory was important for Pune as it meant that Pune went into November tied for first place in the I-League with Salgaocar

Despite their grand October form, Pune could not stop themselves from falling 2–0 to Sporting Goa on 2 November. Goals from Victorino Fernandes and Pratesh Shirodkar sealed Pune's fate. However, Pune managed to come back in their very next match against new direct-entry side Bengaluru FC at home on 6 November in which a goal from James Meyer lead Pune to a 1–0 victory. Then, after a two-week international break, Pune returned to Goa to take on Salgaocar in a top of the table match as the winner would take first place in the league. After going down a goal in the fourth minute from Darryl Duffy, Pune managed to equalize through a Riga Mustapha penalty, his first goal for the club, in the 61st minute. Five days later, Pune returned to the same venue to this time take on Dempo. After going down early once again to a Beto 47th-minute goal it was again Riga Mustapha who came through for Pune with his 51st-minute goal earning Pune a 1–1 draw.

The club then began the month of December with a home match against United on 1 December 2013. After taking the lead in the 77th minute through academy product Nikhil Kadam, United scored their equalizer seven minutes later to force Pune to begin the month with a 1–1 draw. The month then did not get better for Pune as they succumbed to their second defeat of the season at home to arch-rivals Mumbai on 7 December 2013. After going down early to a goal from former India international Pappachen Pradeep, Pune equalized through current India international Arata Izumi in the 41st minute. However, Mumbai scored the winning goal in the 60th minute through Yusif Yakubu. The club then fell to their second defeat in a row in their next match against Rangdajied United at the Nehru Stadium in which, after taking a halftime 2–0 lead through Riga Mustapha and Gurjinder Kumar, the club gave away three second half goals (including two in stoppage time) to lose 3–2. However the club then returned to winning ways when they faced United for the second time that month at the Kalyani Stadium on 15 December 2013. An early brace from Riga Mustapha helped Pune to a 2–1 victory. But that was only a short-lived moment for the club as the side quickly fell to third loss of the season in their next match against Mohun Bagan on 21 December 2013. A brace from Odafe Onyeka Okolie and a goal from Ram Malik saw Pune lose 3–1 with the only Pune goal coming from Academy product Thongkhosiem Haokip.

Once the league restarted for Pune in February 2014, the club first took on Sporting Goa at home on 16 February 2014. After going down early in the 39th minute through Beevan D'Mello goal, Pune managed to equalize in the 56th minute through Thongkhosiem Haokip as Pune drew 1–1. Pune then won their first match of the year only three days later on the 19th against Mohammedan at the Balewadi Sports Complex when they defeated the Kolkata club 2–0. The goals came from Thongkhosiem Haokip and Gabriel Fernandes.

=== Matches ===
21 September 2013 Match 1	Mohammedan	1 – 3	Pune	Kolkata, West Bengal
15:00 IST	Josimar 11'	Report	Fabiani 16', 76'; Meyer 52'	Stadium: Salt Lake Stadium; Referee: Umesh Bora

29 September 2013 Match 2	Shillong Lajong	0 – 0	Pune	Shillong, Meghalaya
16:30 IST		Report		Stadium: Jawaharlal Nehru Stadium; Referee: Rabichandra Singh

10 October 2013 Match 3	Pune	2 – 0	Mohun Bagan	Pune, Maharashtra
19:00 IST	Haokip 72'; Meyer 79'	Report		Stadium: Balewadi Sports Complex; Referee: Umesh Bora

19 October 2013 Match 4	Pune	1 – 0	Churchill Brothers	Pune, Maharashtra
19:15 IST	Angus 52'	Report		Stadium: Balewadi Sports Complex; Referee: Pranjal Banerji

27 October 2013 Match 5	Pune	1 – 0	Rangdajied United	Pune, Maharashtra
18:30 IST	Angus 29'	Report		Stadium: Balewadi Sports Complex; Referee: Pratap Singh

2 November 2013 Match 6	Sporting Goa	0 – 2	Pune	Mapusa, Goa
15:30 IST		Report	Fernandes 54'; Shirodkar 90+4'	Stadium: Duler Stadium; Referee: Rowan Arumughan

6 November 2013 Match 7	Pune	1 – 0	Bengaluru FC	Pune, Maharashtra
18:30 IST	Meyer 71'	Report		Stadium: Balewadi Sports Complex; Referee: Ajit Dutta

22 November 2013 Match 8	Salgaocar	1 – 1	Pune	Mapusa, Goa
15:30 IST	Duffy 4'	Report	Mustapha 61' (pen.)	Stadium: Duler Stadium; Referee: Pranjal Banerji

27 November 2013 Match 9	Dempo	1 – 1	Pune	Margao, Goa
15:30 IST	Beto 47'	Report	Mustapha 51'	Stadium: Fatorda Stadium; Referee: Rowan Arumughan

1 December 2013 Match 10	Pune	1 – 1	United	Pune, Maharashtra
18:00 IST	Kadam 77'	Report	Kottayil 84'	Stadium: Balewadi Sports Complex; Referee: Anthony Simoes

7 December 2013 Match 11	Pune	1 – 2	Mumbai	Pune, Maharashtra
18:00 IST	Izumi 41'	Report	Pradeep 12'; Yakubu 60'	Stadium: Balewadi Sports Complex; Referee: Vishnu Chauhan

11 December 2013 Match 12	Rangdajied United	3 – 2	Pune	Shillong, Meghalaya
17:00 IST	Figueira 62'; Seng-Yong 90+3'; Lalnunpuia 90+5'	Report	Mustapha 23'; Kumar 34'	Stadium: Jawaharlal Nehru Stadium; Referee: Ranjit Bakshi

15 December 2013 Match 13	United	1 – 2	Pune	Kalyani, West Bengal
14:00 IST	Al Moustafa 47'	Report	Mustapha 11', 23'	Stadium: Kalyani Stadium; Referee: Ratheesh Kumar

21 December 2013 Match 14	Mohun Bagan	3 – 1	Pune	Barasat, West Bengal
19:00 IST	Okolie 30', 88'; Malik 75'	Report	Haokip 79'	Stadium: Barasat Stadium; Referee: Umesh Bora

15 February 2014 Match 15	Pune	1 – 1	Sporting Goa	Pune, Maharashtra
19:00 IST	Haokip 56'	Report	D'Mello 39'	Stadium: Balewadi Sports Complex; Referee: C.R. Srikrishna

19 February 2014 Match 16	Pune	2 – 0	Mohammedan	Pune, Maharashtra
18:30 IST	Haokip 43'; Fernandes 54'			Stadium: Balewadi Sports Complex

1 March 2014 Match 17	Mumbai	v	Pune	Pune, Maharashtra
19:00 IST				Stadium: Balewadi Sports Complex

=== Table ===
Pos	Team	Pld	W	D	L	GF	GA	GD	Pts
5	Sporting Goa	24	9	7	8	34	34	0	34
6	Shillong Lajong	24	8	9	7	35	37	−2	33
7	Pune	24	7	8	9	28	32	−4	29
8	Mohun Bagan	24	6	10	8	23	24	−1	28
9	Mumbai	24	5	13	6	31	32	−1	28

Source: IndiaFooty.com
Rules for classification: 1) points; 2) head-to-head points; 3) goal difference; 4) number of goals scored; 5) taking lots

=== Results summary ===
Overall								Home						Away					
Pld	W	D	L	GF	GA	GD	Pts	W	D	L	GF	GA	GD	W	D	L	GF	GA	GD
16	7	5	4	20	16	+4	26	5	2	1	10	4	+6	2	3	3	10	12	−2

Last updated: 19 February 2014.
Source: I-League

=== Results by round ===
Round	1	2	3	4	5	6	7	8	9	10	11	12	13	14	15	16	17	18	19	20	21	22	23	24	25	26	27	28
Ground	A	A	H	H	H	A	H	A	A	H	H	A	A	A	H	H	A											
Result	W	D	W	W	W	L	W	D	D	D	L	L	W	L	D	W												

Updated to match(es) played on 19 February 2014. Source: I-League
A = Away; H = Home; W = Win; D = Draw; L = Loss

== Federation Cup ==
On 29 August 2013 it was announced by the All India Football Federation that the format for the 2013–14 Indian Federation Cup would be the same as in past years. Also at that meeting, it was announced that Pune had been placed in Group A with Churchill Brothers and United with another team to be decided. Then on 28 October 2013 it was announced that the fourth and final team to be placed in Group A would be I-League 2nd Division regulars, Langsning. Matches for the group stage and final rounds were also released around that time. However, on 13 December 2013, it was announced that Langsning had withdrawn from the Federation Cup, meaning that Eagles would replace them.

Pune began their Federation Cup campaign on 14 January 2014 against Eagles at the Jawaharlal Nehru Stadium in Kochi. Despite taking the lead first through Riga Mustapha in the 55th minute, Eagles managed to equalize through Koko Sakibo to draw the match 1–1. Three days later, Pune suffered their first loss of the tournament when they were defeated by United 1–0 through a goal from former Pune player Baldeep Singh.

Then, three days after that, Pune were officially out of the Federation Cup after a 3–2 defeat against eventual champions Churchill Brothers. Pune went down early in the match through an eighth-minute goal from Anthony Wolfe before equalizing through Gabriel Fernandes in the 19th. Lenny Rodrigues then scored for Churchill Brothers to make the score 2–1 before Pune equalized again through Gabriel Fernandes in the 53rd minute. However, Churchill Brothers then scored the winner in the 74th minute through a second Anthony Wolfe goal.

=== Table ===
2013–14 Indian Federation Cup Group stage

=== Matches ===
14 January 2014 Group stage	Pune	1–1	Eagles	Jawaharlal Nehru Stadium, Kochi
	Mustapha 55'	Report	Sakibo 78'

17 January 2014 Group stage	United	1–0	Pune	Jawaharlal Nehru Stadium, Kochi
	Singh 71'	Report

20 January 2014 Group stage	Churchill Brothers	3–2	Pune	Jawaharlal Nehru Stadium, Kochi
	Wolfe 8', 74'; Rodrigues 24'	Report	Fernandes 19', 53'

== Durand Cup ==
For the fifth time in their history, Pune entered the Durand Cup as their opening tournament of the season. On 7 September 2013 it was announced by the club that they would send a mainly academy squad mixed with four senior players; Caitano Costa, Prakash Thorat, Shahinlal Meloly, and Gobin Singh. It was also announced that Naushad Moosa would coach the side during the tournament.

The tournament would turn out to be a short-lived one for the young Pune squad as the team lost both of their two group stage matches, thus ending them in last place in their group. The first loss came against Army Red on 9 September 2013 in which goals from Vipin TV and Lallidianmawia meant that Pune lost 2–0. Then their second loss came four days later against former I-League club ONGC F.C. in which a quick double from Henry Ezeh and an own goal from Hassan Odeola left Pune FC with a 2–1 loss.

=== Squad ===
Note: Flags indicate national team as defined under FIFA eligibility rules; some limited exceptions apply. Players may hold more than one non-FIFA nationality.

No.	Pos.	Nation	Player
—	GK	IND	Shahinlal Meloly
—	GK	IND	Avilash Paul
—	DF	IND	Caitano Costa (captain)
—	DF	IND	Gobin Singh
—	DF	IND	Henry Monsang
—	DF	IND	Kaushal Singh
—	DF	IND	Harshad Lunawat
—	MF	IND	Roushab Dhere
—	MF	IND	Manimaran R

No.	Pos.	Nation	Player
—	MF	IND	Kiran C
—	MF	IND	Rohit Kalsotra
—	MF	IND	Altamash Sayed
—	MF	IND	Soubhagyan Somrajan
—	MF	IND	Diganta Khaddar
—	MF	IND	Sumit Kumar Dubey
—	FW	IND	Prakash Thorat
—	FW	IND	Subhasish Bose
—	FW	IND	Vikas Zanje

=== Table ===
Team	Pld	W	D	L	GF	GA	GD	Pts
ONGC	2	2	0	0	6	2	+4	6
Army Red	2	1	0	1	3	4	−1	3
Pune	2	0	0	2	1	4	−3	0

=== Matches ===
9 September 2013 Group stage	Army Red	2 – 0	Pune	Delhi
17:45 IST	TV 36'; Lallidianmawia 87'	Report		Stadium: Ambedkar Stadium

13 September 2013 Group stage	ONGC	2 – 1	Pune	Delhi
13:30 IST	Ezeh 61', 63'	Report	Odeola 64' (o.g.)	Stadium: Ambedkar Stadium

=== Stats ===
Position	Player	Games	Minutes	Goals
GK	(India) Shahinlal Meloly	1	90	0
GK	(India) Avilash Paul	1	90	0
DF	(India) Caitano Costa	2	180	0
DF	(India) Gobin Singh	2	180	0
DF	(India) Henry Monsang	2	180	0
DF	(India) Kaushal Singh	1	90	0
DF	(India) Harshad Lunawat	1	1	0
MF	(India) Roushab Dhere	2	140	0
MF	(India) Manimaran R	2	142	0
MF	(India) Kiran C	2	180	0
MF	(India) Rohit Kalsotra	1	29	0
MF	(India) Altamash Sayed	2	156	0
MF	(India) Soubhagyan Somrajan	0	0	0
MF	(India) Diganta Khaddar	2	78	0
MF	(India) Sumit Kumar Dubey	1	90	0
FW	(India) Prakash Thorat	1	24	0
FW	(India) Subhasish Bose	2	151	0
FW	(India) Vikas Zanje	2	180	0

== AFC Champions League ==
On 26 November 2013 it was announced by the Asian Football Confederation that India would be awarded 1 spot in the AFC Champions League, Asia's top footballing competition, for 2014 and that Pune would be the representatives for the club in the competition. It was also announced by the AFC that Pune would first have to play in a qualifier in order to make the Champions League group stage proper.

On 10 December 2013, during the AFC Champions League draw, it was announced that Pune would first play in the first round of qualifiers in the East Zone against Hanoi T&T of the V.League 1. They took on the Vietnamese club on 29 January 2014 at the Balewadi Sports Complex in which they were defeated 3–0 by the visitors and thus knocked-out of the AFC Champions League and relegated to the AFC Cup.

=== Qualifiers ===
29 January 2014 First Round	Pune (India)	0 – 3	(Vietnam) Hanoi T&T	Pune, Maharashtra
18:30 IST		Report	Gallagher 52'; Nguyễn Văn Quyết 71'; Hector 83'	Stadium: Balewadi Sports Complex; Attendance: 4,500; Referee: Abdullah Balideh (Qatar)

== AFC Cup ==
=== Group stage ===
Team	Pld	W	D	L	GF	GA	GD	Pts
(Hong Kong) Kitchee	6	4	1	1	15	5	+10	13
(Myanmar) Nay Pyi Taw	6	2	2	2	10	10	0	8
(Singapore) Tampines Rovers	6	2	0	4	9	16	−7	6 (Note: Tiebreakers: Tampines Rovers and Pune are ranked on head-to-head record.)
(India) Pune	6	1	3	2	12	15	−3	6

Notes:

26 February 2014 Match 1	Pune (India)	2–2	(Myanmar) Nay Pyi Taw	Pune, Maharashtra
18:30 IST	Mustapha 9'; Pierre 88'	Report	Zaw Lin 17'; Khine Htoo 85'	Stadium: Shree Shiv Chhatrapati Sports Complex, Pune; Attendance: 3,017; Referee: Vo Minh Tri (Vietnam)

12 March 2014 Match 2	Kitchee (Hong Kong)	2–2	(India) Pune	Mong Kok Stadium, Hong Kong
20:00 UTC+8	Recio 29'; Belencoso 43'	Report	Pavlović 55'; Fernandes 74'	Attendance: 1,837; Referee: Chaiya Mahapab (Thailand)

19 March 2014 Match 3	Tampines Rovers (Singapore)	3–1	(India) Pune	Jalan Besar Stadium, Singapore
19:30 UTC+8	Mrdaković 38', 69'; Closa 62'	Report	Mustapha 16' (pen.)	Attendance: 778; Referee: Wang Di (China PR)

1 April 2014 Match 4	Pune (India)	2–5	(Singapore) Tampines Rovers	Shree Shiv Chhatrapati Sports Complex, Pune
19:00 UTC+5:30	Mustapha 12'; D'Souza 14'	Report	Mrdaković 5'; Ali 43'; Đurić 57', 69'; Fahrudin 60' (pen.)	Attendance: 2,013; Referee: Yaqoob Abdul Baki (Oman)

8 April 2014 Match 5	Nay Pyi Taw (Myanmar)	3–3	(India) Pune	Paung Laung Stadium, Naypyidaw
16:00 UTC+6:30	Aung Kyaw Naing 41'; Nyein Tayzar Win 62'; Khine Htoo 72'	Report	Haokip 36'; Izumi 55'; Angus 80'	Attendance: 464; Referee: Mohd Nafeez Abdul Wahab (Malaysia)

22 April 2014 Match 6	Pune (India)	2–0	(Hong Kong) Kitchee	Shree Shiv Chhatrapati Sports Complex, Pune
17:00 UTC+5:30	Ralte 74', 80'	Report		Attendance: 1,317; Referee: Ali Sabah Adday Al-Qaysi (Iraq)

== Player information ==
=== Squad information ===
Updated 18 February 2014.

No.	Name	Nationality	Position	Date of birth (age)	Previous club
Goalkeepers
1	Amrinder Singh	(India)	GK	27 May 1993 (age 33)	Academy
22	Arup Debnath	(India)	GK	15 July 1987 (age 39)	(India) Mumbai Tigers
27	Shahinlal Meloly	(India)	GK	15 February 1990 (age 36)	(India) Viva Kerala
Defenders
2	Othallo Tabia	(India)	RB	20 October 1983 (age 43)	(India) Viva Kerala
4	Calum Angus	(England)	CB	15 April 1986 (age 40)	(Sweden) GAIS
5	Gurjinder Kumar	(India)	LB	10 October 1990 (age 36)	(India) Tata Football Academy
13	Zohmingliana Ralte	(India)	CB	2 October 1989 (age 37)	(India) Shillong Lajong
14	Denechandra Meitei	(India)	LB	28 March 1994 (age 32)	Academy
15	Anas Edathodika	(India)	CB	15 February 1987 (age 39)	(India) Mumbai
18	Nawab Zeeshan	(India)	LB	2 April 1989 (age 37)	(India) Mumbai Tigers
24	Salam Ranjan Singh	(India)	CB	4 December 1995 (age 30)	Academy
25	Srikanth Ramu	(India)	RB	28 November 1988 (age 37)	Youth Team
29	Gobin Singh	(India)	LB	4 March 1993 (age 33)	Academy
Midfielders
6	Shanmugam Venkatesh	(India)	AMF	21 November 1978 (age 47)	(India) Mohun Bagan
8	Arata Izumi	(India)	AMF	31 July 1982 (age 44)	(India) Mahindra United
11	Douhou Pierre	(Ivory Coast)	AMF	21 December 1987 (age 38)	(India) Mahindra United
12	Nicolau Borges	(India)	MF	20 January 1979 (age 47)	(India) Mohun Bagan
16	Velington Rocha	(India)	MF	24 May 1991 (age 35)	(India) Margao
17	Dhanpal Ganesh	(India)	MF	13 June 1994 (age 32)	Academy
19	Nikhil Kadam	(India)	CMF	23 June 1994 (age 32)	Academy
21	Anthony D'Souza	(India)	LW	2 March 1987 (age 39)	(India) Salgaocar
23	Mumtaz Akhtar	(India)	CMF	8 December 1988 (age 37)	(India) United Sikkim
26	Fanai Lalrempuia	(India)	CMF	11 May 1996 (age 30)	Academy
30	Gabriel Fernandes	(India)	MF	22 April 1988 (age 38)	(India) Dempo
31	Lester Fernandez	(India)	MF	6 December 1986 (age 39)	(India) Mumbai Tigers
Forwards
7	Riga Mustapha	(Netherlands)	ST	10 October 1981 (age 45)	(Spain) Cartagena
10	James Meyer	(Australia)	FW	28 May 1986 (age 40)	(Australia) Brisbane Roar
20	Prakash Thorat	(India)	FW	11 March 1985 (age 41)	Air India
28	Thongkhosiem Haokip	(India)	ST	26 August 1993 (age 33)	Academy

=== Management ===
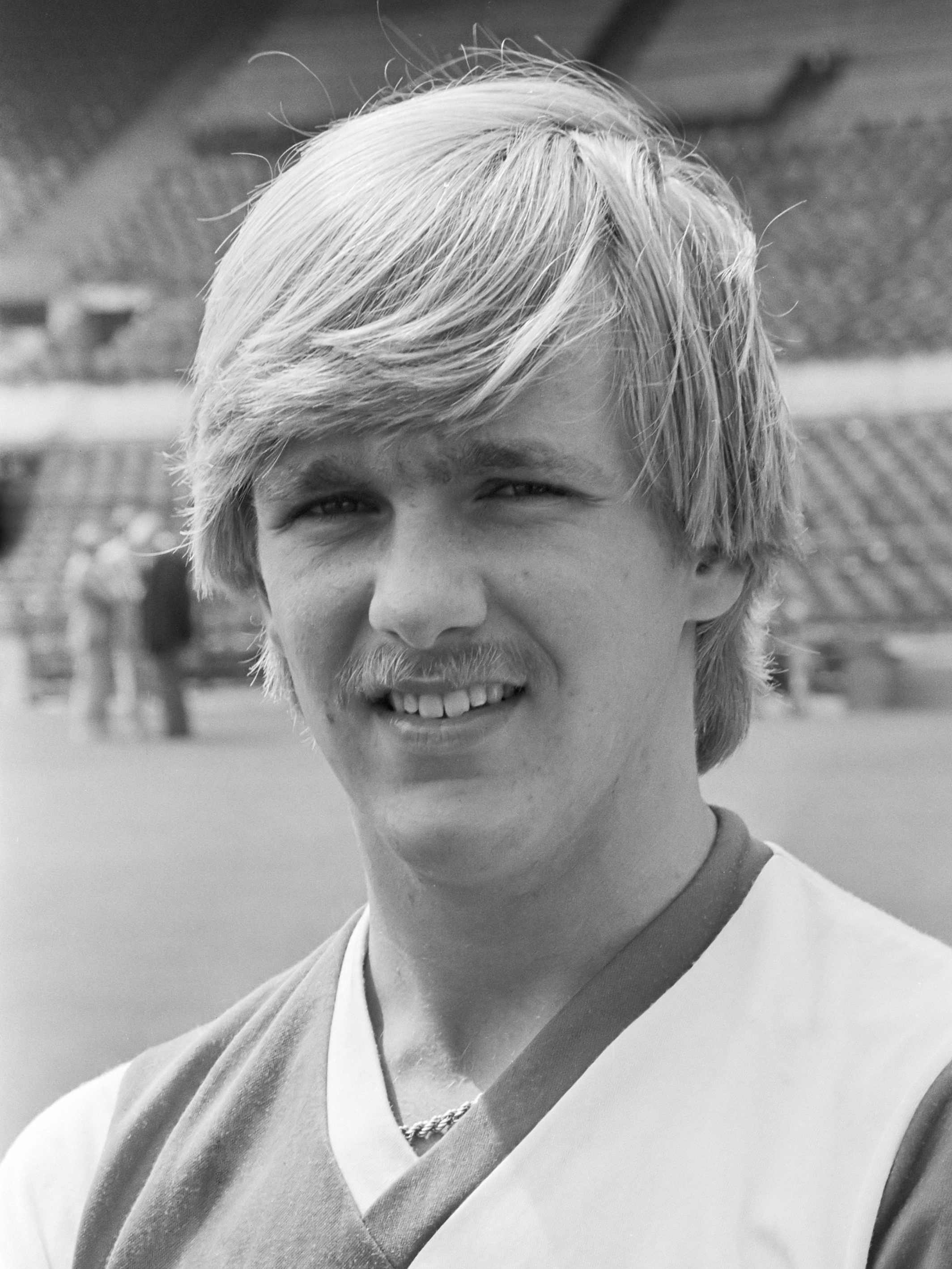
Mike Snoei coaches Pune this season.

As of October 2013.

Position	Name
Head coach	(Netherlands) Mike Snoei
Assistant coach	(India) Gift Raikhan
Goalkeeping coach	(England) Glen Johnson
Physiotherapist	(India) Tariq Shaikh
Fitness coach	(India) Sridhar Krishnamurthy
Kit manager	(India) Prashant Naidu
Academy director	(India) Ranjan Chowdhury
Academy coach	(India) Naushad Moosa

== Player statistics ==
=== Appearances and goals ===
As of 19 February 2014

No.	Pos	Nat	Player	Total		I-League		AFC Champions League		Federation Cup	
No.	Pos	Nat	Player	Apps	Goals	Apps	Goals	Apps	Goals	Apps	Goals
1	GK	(India) IND	Amrinder Singh	19	0	15+0	0	1+0	0	3+0	0
2	DF	(India) IND	Othallo Tabia	14	0	8+3	0	1+0	0	2+0	0
4	DF	(England) ENG	Calum Angus	18	2	14+0	2	1+0	0	3+0	0
5	DF	(India) IND	Gurjinder Kumar	17	1	13+0	1	1+0	0	3+0	0
6	DF	(India) IND	Shanmugam Venkatesh	7	0	0+7	0	0+0	0	0+0	0
7	FW	(Netherlands) NED	Riga Mustapha	14	6	10+0	5	1+0	0	3+0	1
8	MF	(India) IND	Arata Izumi	17	0	13+0	0	1+0	0	2+1	0
10	FW	(Australia) AUS	James Meyer	15	3	10+1	3	0+1	0	3+0	0
11	MF	(Ivory Coast) CIV	Douhou Pierre	20	0	15+1	0	1+0	0	3+0	0
12	DF	(India) IND	Nicolau Borges	0	0	0+0	0	0+0	0	0+0	0
13	DF	(India) IND	Zohmingliana Ralte	3	0	2+1	0	0+0	0	0+0	0
14	DF	(India) IND	Denechandra Meitei	1	0	0+1	0	0+0	0	0+0	0
15	DF	(India) IND	Anas Edathodika	18	0	14+0	0	1+0	0	3+0	0
16	MF	(India) IND	Velington Rocha	6	0	2+4	0	0+0	0	0+0	0
17	MF	(India) IND	Dhanpal Ganesh	10	0	6+1	0	1+0	0	1+1	0
18	DF	(India) IND	Nawab Zeeshan	3	0	0+0	0	0+0	0	2+1	0
19	MF	(India) IND	Nikhil Kadam	10	1	10+0	1	0+0	0	0+0	0
20	FW	(India) IND	Prakash Thorat	3	0	0+3	0	0+0	0	0+0	0
21	MF	(India) IND	Anthony D'Souza	16	0	6+6	0	1+0	0	3+0	0
22	GK	(India) IND	Arup Debnath	1	0	1+0	0	0+0	0	0+0	0
23	MF	(India) IND	Mumtaz Akhtar	14	0	12+1	0	0+0	0	1+0	0
24	DF	(India) IND	Salam Ranjan Singh	7	0	6+1	0	0+0	0	0+0	0
25	MF	(India) IND	Srikanth Ramu	5	0	5+0	0	0+0	0	0+0	0
26	MF	(India) IND	Fanai Lalrempuia	12	0	5+4	0	1+0	0	0+2	0
27	GK	(India) IND	Shahinlal Meloly	0	0	0+0	0	0+0	0	0+0	0
28	FW	(India) IND	Thongkhosiem Haokip	15	4	5+7	4	0+1	0	0+2	0
29	DF	(India) IND	Gobin Singh	0	0	0+0	0	0+0	0	0+0	0
30	MF	(India) IND	Gabriel Fernandes	6	2	2+0	0	1+0	0	1+2	2
31	MF	(India) IND	Lester Fernandez	1	0	0+1	0	0+0	0	0+0	0
	DF	(India) IND	Caitano Costa [ONL]	0	0	0+0	0	0+0	0	0+0	0
	FW	(Equatorial Guinea) GEQ	Raúl Fabiani [L]	2	2	2+0	2	0+0	0	0+0	0

- ONL = Out on loan.
- L = Has left the club during the season.

=== Top scorers ===
Place	Position	Nationality	Number	Name	I-League	AFC Champions League	Federation Cup	Total
1	FW	(Netherlands)	7	Riga Mustapha	5	0	1	6
2	FW	(India)	28	Thongkhosiem Haokip	4	0	0	4
3	FW	(Australia)	10	James Meyer	3	0	0	3
3	MF	(India)	30	Gabriel Fernandes	1	0	2	3
5	DF	(England)	4	Calum Angus	2	0	0	2
5	FW	(Equatorial Guinea)	—	Raúl Fabiani	2	0	0	2
7	MF	(India)	19	Nikhil Kadam	1	0	0	1
7	MF	(India)	8	Arata Izumi	1	0	0	1
7	DF	(India)	5	Gurjinder Kumar	1	0	0	1
TOTALS					20	0	3	23

== International Caps ==
Players called for senior international duty during the 2013–14 season while under contract with Pune.

Nationality	Position	Player	Competition	Date	Contribution	Opponent
India	MF	Arata Izumi	Friendly	14 August 2013	Subbed on in the 46th minute.	v Tajikistan
India	MF	Arata Izumi	2013 SAFF Championship	3 September 2013	Subbed on in the 78th minute.	v Bangladesh
India	MF	Arata Izumi	2013 SAFF Championship	5 September 2013	Started and played 76 minutes.	v Nepal
India	MF	Arata Izumi	2013 SAFF Championship	9 September 2013	Started and played 80 minutes.	v Maldives
India	MF	Arata Izumi	2013 SAFF Championship Final	11 September 2013	Started and the played full match.	v Afghanistan
India	DF	Gurjinder Kumar	Friendly	15 November 2013	Started and the played full match.	v Philippines

== See also ==
- 2013–14 in Indian football
- Pune F.C.
