= I-League transfers for the 2013–14 season =

This is a list of Indian football transfers in the summer transfer window 2013 by club. Only transfers of the I-League are included.

== Transfers ==
=== Bengaluru FC ===
Out: Note: Flags indicate national team as defined under FIFA eligibility rules; some limited exceptions apply. Players may hold more than one non-FIFA nationality.

| No. | Pos. | Nation | Player |
|---|---|---|---|
| — | MF | IND | Thoi Singh (from Mumbai Tigers) |
| — | GK | IND | Bruno Colaço (from Sporting Goa) |
| — | DF | IND | Keegan Pereira (from Salgaocar) |
| — | MF | IND | Gurtej Singh (Free Agent) |
| — | MF | IND | Shankar Sampingiraj (Free Agent) |
| — | DF | ENG | John Johnson (Free Agent) |
| — | DF | KEN | Curtis Osano (Free Agent) |
| — | MF | LBR | Johnny Menyongar (Free Agent) |
| — | FW | IND | Robin Singh (Free Agent) |
| — | FW | IND | Sunil Chhetri (Free Agent) |
| — | DF | IND | Vishal Kumar (from Pailan Arrows) |
| — | DF | IND | Don Bosco Andrew (from (India) SESA Football Academy) |
| — | DF | IND | Lalrozama Fanai (from Mohun Bagan) |
| — | GK | IND | Ricardo Cardozo (from (India) Tata Football Academy) |
| — | GK | IND | Pawan Kumar (from Salgaocar) |
| — | MF | IND | Malemngamba Meetei (from Salgaocar) |
| — | FW | IND | Karan Sawhney (from Salgaocar) |
| — | MF | IND | Darren Caldeira (from Mumbai) |
| — | DF | IND | Rino Anto (Free Agent) |
| — | MF | IND | Sampath Kuttymani (from Mumbai) |
| — | FW | AUS | Sean Rooney (from (Australia) South Coast Wolves) |
| — | MF | IND | C.K. Vineeth (from United S.C.) |

Out: Note: Flags indicate national team as defined under FIFA eligibility rules; some limited exceptions apply. Players may hold more than one non-FIFA nationality.

| No. | Pos. | Nation | Player |

=== Churchill Brothers ===
In: Note: Flags indicate national team as defined under FIFA eligibility rules; some limited exceptions apply. Players may hold more than one non-FIFA nationality.

| No. | Pos. | Nation | Player |
|---|---|---|---|
| — | MF | IND | Micky Fernandes (from Air India) |
| — | MF | IND | Tirthankar Sarkar (from Pailan Arrows) |
| — | GK | IND | Arindam Bhattacharya (from Mohun Bagan) |
| — | DF | POR | Eurípedes Amoreirinha (from (Portugal) Vitória) |
| — | MF | POR | Hugo Machado (from (Iran) Sanat Naft) |
| — | MF | IND | Anthony Barbosa (from Salgaocar) |
| — | FW | IND | Balwant Singh (from Salgaocar) |
| — | GK | IND | Presley Mascarenhas (from Salgaocar) |
| — | DF | IND | Charles Fernandes (from (India) SESA Football Academy) |
| — | DF | IND | Gurpreet Singh (from (India) Cavolossim) |
| — | DF | IND | William Colaco (from Mumbai) |

Out: Note: Flags indicate national team as defined under FIFA eligibility rules; some limited exceptions apply. Players may hold more than one non-FIFA nationality.

| No. | Pos. | Nation | Player |
|---|---|---|---|
| — | MF | BRA | Beto (to Dempo) |
| — | FW | IND | Sunil Chhetri (loan ended; back to Sporting Portugal) |
| — | FW | AFG | Balal Arezou (loan ended; back to (Norway) Asker) |
| — | DF | SEN | Lamine Tamba (Released) |
| — | MF | IND | Steven Dias (Released) |
| — | GK | IND | Sandip Nandy (Released) |
| — | MF | IND | Tomba Singh (Released) |
| — | FW | IND | Xavier Vijay Kumar (Released) |
| — | DF | IND | Gurtej Singh (Released) |
| — | GK | IND | Felix D'Souza (to Salgaocar) |
| — | GK | IND | Melroy Fernandes (to Sporting Goa) |

=== Dempo ===
In: Note: Flags indicate national team as defined under FIFA eligibility rules; some limited exceptions apply. Players may hold more than one non-FIFA nationality.

| No. | Pos. | Nation | Player |
|---|---|---|---|
| — | MF | BRA | Beto (from Churchill Brothers) |
| — | MF | IND | Jewel Raja (from Mohun Bagan) |
| — | DF | IND | Prathamesh Maulingkar (from Pailan Arrows) |
| — | MF | IND | Gabriel Fernandes (from Mumbai) |
| — | DF | AUS | Simon Colosimo (from (Australia) Melbourne Heart) |
| — | FW | IRL | Billy Mehmet (Free Agent) |
| — | FW | IND | Jeje Lalpekhlua (from Pune) |

Out: Note: Flags indicate national team as defined under FIFA eligibility rules; some limited exceptions apply. Players may hold more than one non-FIFA nationality.

| No. | Pos. | Nation | Player |
|---|---|---|---|
| — | FW | JPN | Ryuji Sueoka (to East Bengal) |
| — | DF | IND | Selwyn Fernandes (Released) |
| — | DF | IND | Marcus Peixoto (Released) |
| — | DF | IND | Covan Lawrence (Released) |
| — | FW | NGR | Koko Sakibo (Released) |
| — | MF | LBR | Johnny Menyongar (Released) |
| — | GK | IND | Regan Juliao (Released) |
| — | DF | IND | Rowilson Rodrigues (to Mohun Bagan) |
| — | FW | IND | Joaquim Abranches (Released) |
| — | MF | IND | Anthony Pereira (Released) |
| — | DF | IND | Valeriano Rebello (Released) |
| — | FW | IND | Cliffton Gonsalves (Released) |
| — | MF | IND | Climax Lawrence (to Mumbai) |
| — | MF | IND | Nicolau Borges (to Mohun Bagan) |

=== East Bengal ===
In: Note: Flags indicate national team as defined under FIFA eligibility rules; some limited exceptions apply. Players may hold more than one non-FIFA nationality.

| No. | Pos. | Nation | Player |
|---|---|---|---|
| — | FW | JPN | Ryuji Sueoka (from Dempo) |
| — | GK | IND | Abhra Mondal (from Pune) |
| — | FW | SSD | James Moga (Free Agent) |
| — | FW | IND | Joaquim Abranches (Free Agent) |
| — | MF | IND | Shylo Malsawmtluanga (Free Agent) |
| — | MF | IND | Dipankar Roy (Free Agent) |
| — | FW | IND | Nilendra Dewan (Free Agent) |

Out: Note: Flags indicate national team as defined under FIFA eligibility rules; some limited exceptions apply. Players may hold more than one non-FIFA nationality.

| No. | Pos. | Nation | Player |
|---|---|---|---|
| — | FW | IND | Robin Singh (Released) |
| — | MF | NGR | Penn Orji (to Mohammedan) |
| — | FW | AUS | Andrew Barisic (Released) |
| — | MF | IND | Khanthang Paite (Released) |

=== Mohammedan ===
In: Note: Flags indicate national team as defined under FIFA eligibility rules; some limited exceptions apply. Players may hold more than one non-FIFA nationality.

| No. | Pos. | Nation | Player |
|---|---|---|---|
| — | DF | BRA | Luciano Sabrosa (Free Agent) |
| — | FW | BRA | Josimar (Free Agent) |
| — | FW | AUS | Tolgay Özbey (Free Agent) |
| — | MF | NGR | Penn Orji (from East Bengal) |
| — | DF | IND | Collin Abranches (from Salgaocar) |
| — | MF | IND | Sandeep Sangha (from Air India) |
| — | MF | IND | Khanthang Paite (from East Bengal) |
| — | DF | IND | Justin Stephen (from Mumbai) |
| — | DF | IND | Faizal Rehman (from Mumbai) |
| — | FW | IND | Budhiram Tudu (from United Sikkim) |
| — | GK | IND | Ashok Singh (from Sporting Goa) |
| — | GK | IND | Sukhwinder Singh (from Air India) |
| — | DF | IND | Sukanta Banerjee (from (India) Bhawanipore) |

Out: Note: Flags indicate national team as defined under FIFA eligibility rules; some limited exceptions apply. Players may hold more than one non-FIFA nationality.

| No. | Pos. | Nation | Player |
|---|---|---|---|
| — | GK | IND | Arnab Das Sharma (Released) |
| — | MF | IND | Mohammad Mukhtar (to (India) Southern Samity) |

=== Mohun Bagan ===
In: Note: Flags indicate national team as defined under FIFA eligibility rules; some limited exceptions apply. Players may hold more than one non-FIFA nationality.

| No. | Pos. | Nation | Player |
|---|---|---|---|
| — | MF | IND | Adil Khan (from Sporting Goa) |
| — | DF | IND | Rino Anto (Free Agent) |
| — | DF | IND | Wahid Sali (from ONGC) |
| — | GK | IND | Sandip Nandy (Free Agent) |
| — | DF | IND | Rowilson Rodrigues (from Dempo) |
| — | MF | JPN | Katsumi Yusa (from ONGC) |
| — | DF | IND | Ravinder Singh (from Prayag United) |
| — | MF | IND | Anthony Pereira (Free Agent) |
| — | FW | IND | Snehasish Dutta (from (India) Bhawanipore) |
| — | GK | IND | Bubai Singh (from Air India) |
| — | MF | IND | Zakeer Mundampara (from Prayag United) |
| — | MF | IND | Nicolau Borges (from Dempo) |

Out: Note: Flags indicate national team as defined under FIFA eligibility rules; some limited exceptions apply. Players may hold more than one non-FIFA nationality.

| No. | Pos. | Nation | Player |
|---|---|---|---|
| — | MF | IND | Jewel Raja (to Dempo) |
| — | FW | AUS | Tolgay Özbey (Released) |
| — | MF | IND | Snehasish Chakraborty (Released) |
| — | DF | IND | Nirmal Chettri (Released) |
| — | MF | NAM | Quinton Jacobs (Released) |
| — | MF | IND | Manish Maithani (Released) |
| — | GK | IND | Arindam Bhattacharya (to Churchill Brothers) |
| — | DF | IND | Rakesh Masih (to Salgaocar) |
| — | DF | IND | Rino Anto (Released) |
| — | DF | IND | Lalrozama Fanai (to Bengaluru FC) |

=== Mumbai ===
In: Note: Flags indicate national team as defined under FIFA eligibility rules; some limited exceptions apply. Players may hold more than one non-FIFA nationality.

| No. | Pos. | Nation | Player |
|---|---|---|---|
| — | FW | IND | Branco Cardozo (from Air India) |
| — | MF | AFG | Zohib Islam Amiri (Re-signed) |
| — | DF | IND | Anwar Ali (from United Sikkim) |
| — | MF | IND | Climax Lawrence (from Dempo) |
| — | DF | IND | Valeriano Rebello (Free Agent) |
| — | GK | IND | Nidhin Lal (Free Agent) |

Out: Note: Flags indicate national team as defined under FIFA eligibility rules; some limited exceptions apply. Players may hold more than one non-FIFA nationality.

| No. | Pos. | Nation | Player |
|---|---|---|---|
| — | MF | AFG | Zohib Islam Amiri (Released) |
| — | MF | IND | Gabriel Fernandes (to Dempo) |
| — | DF | IND | Justin Stephen (to Mohammedan) |
| — | DF | IND | Faizal Rehman (to Mohammedan) |
| — | MF | IND | Chhangte Malsawmkima (to Mumbai Tigers) |
| — | DF | IND | William Colaco (to Churchill Brothers) |
| — | MF | IND | Darren Caldeira (to Bengaluru FC) |
| — | MF | IND | Sampath Kuttymani (to Bengaluru FC) |

=== Mumbai Tigers ===
In: Note: Flags indicate national team as defined under FIFA eligibility rules; some limited exceptions apply. Players may hold more than one non-FIFA nationality.

| No. | Pos. | Nation | Player |
|---|---|---|---|
| — | DF | IND | Nallappan Mohanraj (from Pune) |
| — | MF | IND | Pradeep Mohanraj (from Air India) |
| — | GK | IND | Rehnesh TP (from ONGC) |
| — | MF | IND | Royston Dsouza (from Salgaocar) |
| — | DF | IND | Rahul Bheke (from Air India) |
| — | DF | IND | Ningthoujam Samananda (from Sporting Goa) |
| — | MF | IND | Chhangte Malsawmkima (from Mumbai) |
| — | FW | IND | Sanju Kumar (from (India) Bhawanipore) |
| — | MF | IND | Sehnaj Singh (from Pailan Arrows) |
| — | MF | IND | Abhishek Ambedkar (from Air India) |
| — | FW | IND | Pritam Singh (from Sporting Goa) |
| — | MF | IND | Raju Sohail Haque (from (India) RCF) |
| — | GK | IND | Arnab Das Sharma (Free Agent) |
| — | DF | IND | Chinta Chandrashekar Rao (from Prayag United) |
| — | MF | IND | Lester Fernandez (from Prayag United) |

Out: Note: Flags indicate national team as defined under FIFA eligibility rules; some limited exceptions apply. Players may hold more than one non-FIFA nationality.

| No. | Pos. | Nation | Player |
|---|---|---|---|
| — | FW | IND | Thoi Singh (to Bengaluru FC) |
| — | FW | IND | Mohammed Rafi (Released) |
| — | MF | IND | Pappachen Pradeep (Released) |
| — | GK | IND | Arup Debnath (to Pune) |

=== Pailan Arrows ===
In: Note: Flags indicate national team as defined under FIFA eligibility rules; some limited exceptions apply. Players may hold more than one non-FIFA nationality.

| No. | Pos. | Nation | Player |

Out: Note: Flags indicate national team as defined under FIFA eligibility rules; some limited exceptions apply. Players may hold more than one non-FIFA nationality.

| No. | Pos. | Nation | Player |
|---|---|---|---|
| — | MF | IND | Tirthankar Sarkar (to Churchill Brothers) |
| — | MF | IND | Milan Singh (to Shillong Lajong) |
| — | DF | IND | Deepak Devrani (to Sporting Goa) |
| — | GK | IND | Ravi Kumar (to Sporting Goa) |
| — | MF | IND | Sehnaj Singh (to Mumbai Tigers) |
| — | DF | IND | Vishal Kumar (to Bengaluru FC) |
| — | MF | IND | Shankar Sampingiraj (to Bengaluru FC) |

=== Prayag United ===
In: Note: Flags indicate national team as defined under FIFA eligibility rules; some limited exceptions apply. Players may hold more than one non-FIFA nationality.

| No. | Pos. | Nation | Player |
|---|---|---|---|
| — | MF | LBR | Eric Brown (from ONGC) |

Out: Note: Flags indicate national team as defined under FIFA eligibility rules; some limited exceptions apply. Players may hold more than one non-FIFA nationality.

| No. | Pos. | Nation | Player |
|---|---|---|---|
| — | MF | CRC | Carlos Hernández (to (New Zealand) Wellington Phoenix) |
| — | DF | IND | Gouramangi Singh (Released) |
| — | MF | IND | Shylo Tulunga (to Mohun Bagan) |
| — | DF | IND | Ravinder Singh (to Mohun Bagan) |
| — | FW | NZL | Kayne Vincent (Released) |
| — | DF | IND | Chinta Chandrashekar Rao (to Mumbai Tigers) |
| — | MF | IND | Lester Fernandez (to Mumbai Tigers) |
| — | MF | IND | Zakeer Mundampara (to Mohun Bagan) |

=== Pune ===
In: Note: Flags indicate national team as defined under FIFA eligibility rules; some limited exceptions apply. Players may hold more than one non-FIFA nationality.

| No. | Pos. | Nation | Player |
|---|---|---|---|
| — | FW | IND | Prakash Thorat (from Air India) |
| — | MF | IND | Anthony D'Souza (from Salgaocar) |
| — | GK | IND | Arup Debnath (from Mumbai Tigers) |
| — | FW | GEQ | Raúl Fabiani (from (Spain) Huracán Valencia CF) |
| — | DF | ENG | Calum Angus (Free Agent) |
| — | FW | AUS | James Meyer (Free Agent) |
| — | DF | IND | Salam Ranjan Singh (from Pune F.C. Academy) |
| — | DF | IND | Longjam Gobin Singh (from Pune F.C. Academy) |
| — | FW | IND | Thongkhosiem Haokip (from Pune F.C. Academy) |

Out: Note: Flags indicate national team as defined under FIFA eligibility rules; some limited exceptions apply. Players may hold more than one non-FIFA nationality.

| No. | Pos. | Nation | Player |
|---|---|---|---|
| — | DF | NGR | Chika Wali (to Salgaocar) |
| — | MF | IND | Karma Tsewang (to Salgaocar) |
| — | FW | IND | Subhash Singh (to Shillong Lajong) |
| — | FW | LBR | Boima Karpeh (to Sporting Goa) |
| — | FW | SSD | James Moga (Released) |
| — | GK | IND | Abhra Mondal (to East Bengal) |
| — | FW | IND | Jeje Lalpekhlua (to Dempo) |
| — | DF | IND | Nallappan Mohanraj (to Mumbai Tigers) |
| — | MF | IND | Sukhwinder Singh (Released) |

=== Rangdajied United ===
In: Note: Flags indicate national team as defined under FIFA eligibility rules; some limited exceptions apply. Players may hold more than one non-FIFA nationality.

| No. | Pos. | Nation | Player |
|---|---|---|---|
| — | DF | SEN | Lamine Tamba (Free Agent) |
| — | FW | IND | Sandesh Gadkari (from Air India) |
| — | DF | IND | Pratik Chaudhari (from Air India) |

Out: Note: Flags indicate national team as defined under FIFA eligibility rules; some limited exceptions apply. Players may hold more than one non-FIFA nationality.

| No. | Pos. | Nation | Player |

=== Salgaocar ===
In: Note: Flags indicate national team as defined under FIFA eligibility rules; some limited exceptions apply. Players may hold more than one non-FIFA nationality.

| No. | Pos. | Nation | Player |
|---|---|---|---|
| — | DF | NGR | Chika Wali (from Pune) |
| — | MF | IND | Karma Tsewang (from Pune) |
| — | FW | IND | Albino Pereira (from Salgaocar Youth Team) |
| — | DF | IND | Anthony Cardozo (from Salgaocar Youth Team) |
| — | MF | IND | Rayman Fernandes (from Salgaocar Youth Team) |
| — | GK | IND | Felix D'Souza (from Churchill Brothers) |
| — | DF | IND | Rakesh Masih (from Mohun Bagan) |
| — | MF | IND | Jeevan Nalge (from (India) Deccan) |
| — | FW | IND | Kannan Rajendran (Free Agent) |
| — | MF | JPN | Seiji Saito (Free Agent) |
| — | FW | SCO | Darryl Duffy (Free Agent) |
| — | FW | FRA | Claude Gnakpa (Free Agent) |
| — | | IND | Vigneshwaran B (from Food Corporation of India) |
| — | | IND | Afftabvir Singh (from (India) JCT Academy) |
| — | | IND | Bali Gagandeep (from (India) Mahilpur United) |

Out: Note: Flags indicate national team as defined under FIFA eligibility rules; some limited exceptions apply. Players may hold more than one non-FIFA nationality.

| No. | Pos. | Nation | Player |
|---|---|---|---|
| — | DF | BRA | Luciano Sabrosa (Released) |
| — | FW | BRA | Josimar (Released) |
| — | DF | IND | Collin Abranches (to Mohammedan) |
| — | MF | SGP | John Wilkinson (to (Singapore) Tanjong Pagar United) |
| — | MF | IND | Beevan D'Mello (to Sporting Goa) |
| — | MF | IND | Cajetan Fernandes (to Sporting Goa) |
| — | DF | IND | Keegan Pereira (to Bengaluru FC) |
| — | MF | IND | Anthony Barbosa (to Churchill Brothers) |
| — | FW | NGR | O. J. Obatola (Released) |
| — | MF | IND | Royston Dsouza (to Mumbai Tigers) |
| — | FW | IND | Balwant Singh (to Churchill Brothers) |
| — | GK | IND | Presley Mascarenhas (to Churchill Brothers) |
| — | GK | IND | Vinay Singh (to Shillong Lajong) |
| — | MF | IND | Anthony D'Souza (to Pune) |
| — | GK | IND | Pawan Kumar (to Bengaluru FC) |
| — | MF | IND | Malemngamba Meetei (to Bengaluru FC) |
| — | FW | IND | Karan Sawhney (to Bengaluru FC) |

=== Shillong Lajong ===
In: Note: Flags indicate national team as defined under FIFA eligibility rules; some limited exceptions apply. Players may hold more than one non-FIFA nationality.

| No. | Pos. | Nation | Player |
|---|---|---|---|
| — | FW | IND | Subhash Singh (from Pune) |
| — | MF | IND | Milan Singh (from Pailan Arrows) |
| — | DF | IND | Robin Gurung (from ONGC) |
| — | FW | TTO | Cornell Glen (from (Trinidad and Tobago) North East Stars) |
| — | FW | CMR | Charles Edoa (from (Cameroon) Union Douala) |
| — | GK | IND | Vinay Singh (from Salgaocar) |

Out: Note: Flags indicate national team as defined under FIFA eligibility rules; some limited exceptions apply. Players may hold more than one non-FIFA nationality.

| No. | Pos. | Nation | Player |

=== Sporting Goa ===
In: Note: Flags indicate national team as defined under FIFA eligibility rules; some limited exceptions apply. Players may hold more than one non-FIFA nationality.

| No. | Pos. | Nation | Player |
|---|---|---|---|
| — | DF | IND | Deepak Devrani (from Pailan Arrows) |
| — | GK | IND | Ravi Kumar (from Pailan Arrows) |
| — | FW | LBR | Boima Karpeh (from Pune) |
| — | MF | IND | Beevan D'Mello (from Salgaocar) |
| — | MF | IND | Cajetan Fernandes (from Salgaocar) |
| — | GK | IND | Melroy Fernandes (from Churchill Brothers) |
| — | DF | ESP | Arturo Navarro (from CD Guijuelo) |
| — | DF | ESP | Gonzalo Hinojal (from CD Guijuelo) |

Out: Note: Flags indicate national team as defined under FIFA eligibility rules; some limited exceptions apply. Players may hold more than one non-FIFA nationality.

| No. | Pos. | Nation | Player |
|---|---|---|---|
| — | MF | IND | Adil Khan (to Mohun Bagan) |
| — | FW | JPN | Seiya Sugishita (Released) |
| — | FW | ESP | Juanfri (Released) |
| — | DF | ESP | Ángel Berlanga (Released) |
| — | GK | IND | Ashok Singh (to Mohammedan) |
| — | MF | IND | Freiman Peixoto (Released) |
| — | GK | IND | Bruno Colaço (to Bengaluru FC) |
| — | DF | IND | Ningthoujam Samananda (to Mumbai Tigers) |
| — | FW | IND | Pritam Singh (to Mumbai Tigers) |
