= Mike Snoei =

Dutch footballer and manager

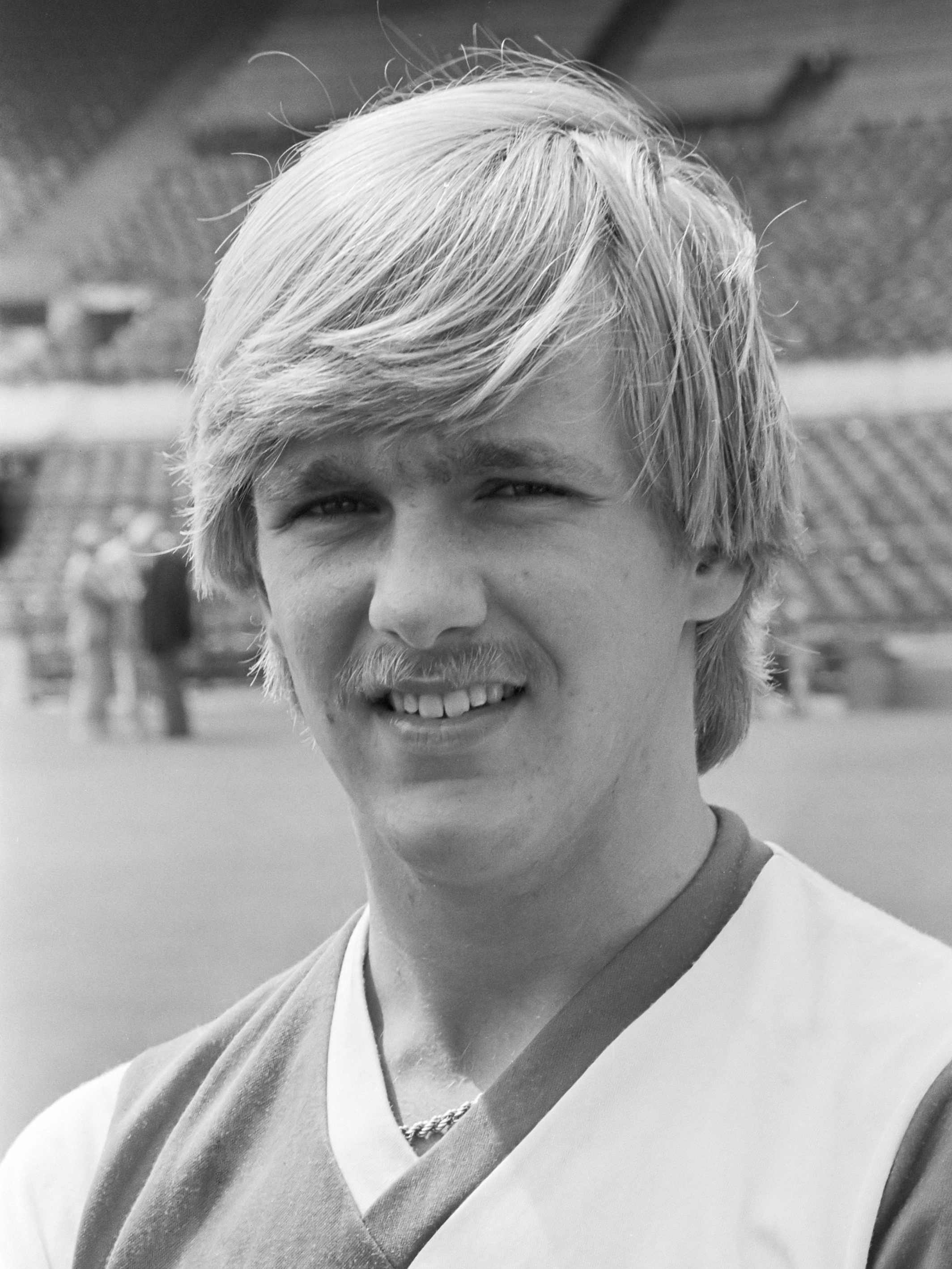
- Snoei in 1982

Personal information
- Date of birth: 4 December 1963 (age 62)
- Place of birth: Rotterdam, Netherlands
- Position: Defender

Youth career
- Feyenoord

Senior career*
Years	Team	Apps	(Gls)
1981–1982	Feyenoord	1	(0)
1982–1988	Excelsior	137	(0)
1988–1993	Sparta Rotterdam	133	(1)
Total		271	(1)

Managerial career
- 2002–2003: Vitesse Arnhem
- 2003–2005: Sparta Rotterdam
- 2005–2008: Go Ahead Eagles
- 2008–2009: Panathinaikos (assistant)
- 2009–2011: Umm Salal (assistant)
- 2012: Shandong Luneng Taishan (assistant)
- 2013–2014: Pune FC
- 2015–2017: Metalurh Zaporizhzhia (sporting director)
- 2017–2019: Telstar
- 2019–2021: De Graafschap
- 2022–2024: Telstar
- 2024: Trikala
- * Club domestic league appearances and goals

Mike Snoei (born 4 December 1963) is a former Dutch football player and manager. During his playing days, Snoei played for Excelsior and Sparta Rotterdam in the Eredivisie and Eerste Divisie from 1982 to 1993. He was a member of the Dutch squad at the 1983 FIFA World Youth Championship.

== Playing career ==
Born in Rotterdam, Snoei managed to carve out a ten-year playing career in the Netherlands in the top-tier Eredivisie and second-tier Eerste Divisie. He started his footballing career as a youth with Feyenoord, the biggest club in Rotterdam, before moving to second division side S.B.V. Excelsior. He stayed with Excelsior for six years from 1982 to 1986 before joining Sparta Rotterdam. While with Sparta, Snoei played in the Dutch top tier Eredivisie.

Unfortunately, Snoei had to retire from the game in 1993 due to torn knee ligaments at the age of 29.

== Coaching career ==
=== Youth coach: 1993–2002 ===
Following retirement from professional football, Snoei became a youth coach in the Netherlands, coaching various clubs from 1993 to 1996. Then in 1996, Snoei joined the Vitesse youth organization where he eventually rose to head coach of the main youth team at the club.

=== Head coach at Dutch clubs: 2002–2008 ===
In 2002, Snoei was appointed as the head coach of Vitesse in the Eredivisie. After coaching the club for one season, Snoei then moved to Sparta Rotterdam as head coach from 2003 to 2005 before moving to Go Ahead Eagles as the head coach in 2005 to 2008. While at Sparta and Go Ahead Eagles, Snoei led both clubs to the promotion play-offs for the Eredivisie.

=== Assistant coaching: 2008–2013 ===
After leaving Go Ahead Eagles, Snoei left the Netherlands and became the assistant manager to Henk ten Cate at many clubs including Panathinakos from 2008 to 2010, Al Ahli of the UAE Arabian Gulf League in 2010, Umm Salal of the Qatar Stars League from 2010 to 2011, and then Shandong Luneng of the Chinese Super League from 2011 to 2012.

=== Pune and India: 2013–2017 ===
On 8 May 2013, it was announced that Snoei would be returning to head coaching at Pune F.C. of the I-League in India. The Director of Football at Pune said that "Mike will be a great addition to Pune FC. He brings with him a wealth of experience from the top levels of both European and Asian football. As we continue to invest in our academy and youth teams, Mike will be the perfect fit to develop these players and help the club reach our long term goals". Snoei also became the fourth Dutch coach to be involved in Indian football after Wim Koevermans was signed as head coach of the national team, Rob Baan was brought in as the AIFF technical-director, and Eelco Schattorie was signed on as the head coach of fellow I-League club United.

Snoei's first signing at the club came on 7 June 2013 when the club signed up forward Prakash Thorat for the upcoming 2013–14 season. Snoei then led Pune in his first game as head coach on 21 September 2013 against Mohammedan at the Salt Lake Stadium. It was a successful debut for Snoei as his side won the match 3–1 thanks to a brace from new signing Raúl Fabiani and a goal from another new foreign signing James Meyer. He then coached Pune at home for the first time on 10 October 2013 against Mohun Bagan. Pune won the match 2–0 thanks to goals from academy product Thongkhosiem Haokip and James Meyer.

=== Back to the Netherlands: 2017–2024 ===
In 2017, Snoei moved back to the Netherlands as the new manager of Eerste Divisie club Telstar. He left Telstar in 2019 to accept an offer at De Graafschap, which he guided for two seasons.

On 11 June 2022, Telstar announced to have reappointed Snoei as their manager. He was dismissed after poor results in February 2024.

== Approach and philosophy ==
After joining Pune F.C. Snoei said that the approach he wants to take the club in is one where youth development is key to the club's success. After his first press conference as head coach of the club Snoei said "Our main objective is to develop youngsters at the club. In this season, you will see good young players getting a fair chance in the first team. Striking the right balance is of utmost importance". He also said he would like to incorporate a Dutch style of play into the club.

== Managerial statistics ==
As of 30 July 2024.

Team	From	To	Record				
Team	From	To	G	W	D	L	Win %
Pune	8 May 2013	30 June 2014	31	8	11	12	25.81
Telstar	1 July 2017	30 June 2019	80	31	19	30	38.75
De Graafschap	1 July 2019	19 May 2021	71	41	19	11	57.75
Telstar	1 July 2022	5 February 2024	65	19	15	31	29.23
Total			247	99	64	84	40.08
