= Amrinder Singh =

Indian footballer (born 1993)

Personal information
- Full name: Amrinder Ranjit Singh
- Date of birth: 27 May 1993 (age 33)
- Place of birth: Mahilpur, Punjab, India
- Height: 1.87 m (6 ft 2 in)
- Position: Goalkeeper

Team information
- Current team: Kerala Blasters
- Number: 1

Youth career
- 2008–2010: Sports Wing Academy Paldi
- 2010–2011: Pune

Senior career*
| Years | Team | Apps | (Gls) |
| 2011–2015 | Pune | 61 | (0) |
| 2015 | → ATK (loan) | 13 | (0) |
| 2016 | → Bengaluru (loan) | 11 | (0) |
| 2016–2017 | Bengaluru | 12 | (0) |
| 2016 | → Mumbai City (loan) | 6 | (0) |
| 2017–2021 | Mumbai City | 76 | (0) |
| 2021–2022 | Mohun Bagan | 22 | (0) |
| 2022–2026 | Odisha | 56 | (0) |
| 2026– | Kerala Blasters | 2 | (0) |

International career^{‡}
| 2014–2016 | India U23 | 5 | (0) |
| 2017–2024 | India | 14 | (0) |
Medal record
Men's football
Representing India
SAFF Championship
| Winner | 2023 India |
CAFA Nations Cup
| Third place | 2025 Tajikistan–Uzbekistan | Team |
- * Club domestic league appearances and goals as of 16:55, 25 October 2026 (UTC) ‡ National team caps and goals as of 22:00, 3 September 2024 (UTC)

Amrinder Ranjit Singh (born 27 May 1993) is an Indian professional footballer who plays as a goalkeeper for Indian Super League club Kerala Blasters.

== Early life and youth career ==
Amrinder was born on 27 May 1993 in Mahilpur, Punjab, India. Amrinder took up the game of football at a young age but did not play consistently until the age of 15 when he joined his school's government-ran academy, Sports Wing Academy in Paldi, Hoshiarpur in Punjab. Initially Amrinder started at the under-17 level as a striker at Sports Wing Academy but his coach, Yarvinder Singh, noticed that Amrinder had a good build and reach, and encouraged him to be a goalkeeper. He started excelling as a goalkeeper and stayed at the Sports Wing Academy for another two years. While still at Sports Wing, Amrinder was selected by the Punjab Football Association to represent the Punjab state national team at the under-17 and under-19 levels. His greatest achievement with the Punjab team was helping them win the BC Roy Trophy. After winning the BC Roy Trophy, he was advised by former Pune player Asim Hassan's father, a well-known coach in Punjab, to trial at the Pune Academy. He passed the trial and was placed in the under-19 squad.

== Club career ==
=== Pune ===
==== 2011–12 season ====
After joining the Pune Academy and showing off his goalkeeping skills during the summer of 2011, Singh was selected to join the first team squad of Pune at the age of 18. He made his debut against ONGC FC in 2011 Durand Cup where Pune fielded a second team as the first team was preparing for the exhibition match against Blackburn Rovers. The match ended in a 1–1 draw. He then came on as a substitute during the 2011 Indian Federation Cup after Indian international Subrata Pal came off against East Bengal due to an injury. Pune lost the match 1–2 with Singh conceding the second goal. He kept his cleansheet for Pune in next match Mohammedan which ended in a 0–0 stalemate. Singh then made his I-League debut for Pune coming on as a substitute for Shahinlal Meloly in the 21st minute against East Bengal. Pune lost the match 1–3 with all three goals coming in after Amrinder came on to the pitch. On 5 February 2012, Amrinder kept his first league cleansheet of his career against then league leaders Dempo as Pune went on to win the match 1–0. He ended the season with 3 cleansheets in 9 appearances.

==== 2012–13 season ====
Amrinder started the season with a cleansheet in a goalless draw against CR Police at Durand Cup on 23 August. He also kept a cleansheet in 1–0 win over United Sikkim in the opening game of Federation Cup. He overtook Shahinlal Meloly and Abhra Mondal as the first choice keeper and played his first game of the 2012-13 I-League season on 14 April 2013 against ONGC F.C. where he kept a clean sheet in a 1–0 win. He also started in the next match against Air India FC on 20 April, where he kept a clean sheet in 6–0 thrashing win. Singh ended the season with a cleansheet on 11 May in a 2–0 victory against Indian Arrows. He kept 6 cleansheets in 10 appearances.

==== 2013–14 season ====
Amrinder continued as Pune's No.1 goalkeeper in the 2013–14 I-League season. He started in the first league match of the season against Mohammedan on 21 September 2013 at the Salt Lake Stadium. During the match, Singh gave away a goal to Josimar as Pune went on to win 3–1. After that match, Singh went on a run of clean-sheets, keeping four in a row before conceding two goals and losing 2–0 to Sporting Goa on 2 November where he was also sent off in the 81st minute after he brought down the last man on the ball for Sporting Goa.

On 29 January 2014, Singh made his continental debut for Pune in their 2014 AFC Champions League qualifying play-off round 1 tie against Hanoi T&T which ended in a 3–0 defeat as he played the full game. He made his AFC Cup debut on 26 February 2014 in a 2–2 draw against Nay Pyi Taw. He received his second red card of the season on 23 March 2014 against Churchill Brothers in 44th minute when tried to sweep the ball off the feet of Anthony Wolfe but caught the foot of Wolfe. The match ended in a 3–2 loss. He kept his first continental cleansheet against Kitchee in a 2–0 victory on 22 April where he also saved a penalty from Juan Belencoso which made way for a historic win. He played last game of the season on 28 April against Dempo in a 3–0 loss which was also his 50th appearance for Pune.

==== 2014–15 season ====
He started the season with a cleansheet in a 3–0 win over Churchill Brothers on 31 October at 2014 Durand Cup. He also played in the final of the tournament where Pune lost to Salgaocar 1–0. He also started in every game of King's cup held at Bhutan where Pune lost to Sheikh Jamal Dhanmondi Club in the final 1–0. Amrinder played his first match of the 2014-15 I-League season against Salgaocar on 17 January 2015 which ended in a 1–1 draw. Amrinder won his first match of the season with Pune on 24 January against the defending champions Bengaluru which ended with a score 1–3. Amrinder lost his first match of the season against Mohun Bagan on 7 February with a score of 1–0. Amrinder played his last match of the season and last match for Pune on 30 May 2015 against Sporting Goa, which ended in a disastrous 4–0 loss.

==== ATK (loan) ====
On 15 September 2015, Amrinder joined Indian Super League club ATK for the 2015 season on loan from Pune. He made his debut on 3 October 2015 in a 2–3 victory against Chennaiyin FC. He kept his first and only clean sheet on 22 November in 4–0 thrashing of Goa. ATK qualified for playoffs and lost to Chennaiyin FC on an aggregate score of 4–2 from both legs with Amrinder in goal.

=== Bengaluru ===
==== 2015–16 (loan) ====
On 25 December 2015, Amrinder signed for Bengaluru on loan from Pune for the rest of the season. He kept a clean sheet on his debut on 30 January 2016 against East Bengal which ended in a 0–1 away win. He also kept a cleansheet on his continental debut for Bengaluru in a 1–0 victory over Ayeyawady United on 16 March. He was also in the goal in the last league match against Mohun Bagan on 23 April which ended in a disastrous 5–0 loss. Despite the lose, Bengaluru won the I-League and Amrinder went on to win the best goalkeeper of the I-League season award with five clean sheets under his belt. He registered 6 cleansheets in 17 starts.

==== 2016–17: AFC Cup Final Miss ====
On 16 June 2016, Amrinder signed for Bengaluru on a permanent deal till end of the season. He started the season with a cleansheet in a 1–0 victory against Tampines Rovers in AFC Cup quarter finals first leg. A week later, he kept another cleansheet in second leg as Bengaluru advanced to semifinal of the tournament. He started in both legs of semifinal against Johor DT as Bengaluru won 4–2 on aggregate on 19 October and became first ever Indian club to reach AFC Cup final. But he received his second yellow card of the tournament which meant that he would be suspended for the final. He missed the all-important 2016 AFC Cup final where Bengaluru lost to Al-Quwa Al-Jawiya 1–0.

He started the I-League campaign with a cleansheet against Shillong Lajong in a 3–0 victory on 7 January 2017 which was followed by another two cleansheets against Chennai and Mumbai in 2-0 and 3-0 wins respectively. On 18 February 2017, he was substituted off in 39th minute of goalless draw against Mumbai due to a thigh injury which ruled him out for a month. Amrinder was in goal for Bengaluru in their huge victory of 7–0 over DSK Shivajians on 22 April. Amrinder played a pivotal role in the club's campaign in the 2016-17 Federation Cup as he conceded only one goal in three games. He started in the final where he made many saves important saves and kept a cleansheet in the 2–0 victory after extra time. He was also adjudged the man of the match.

=== Mumbai City ===
==== 2016 (loan) ====
Amrinder was loaned to Indian Super League side Mumbai City from Bengaluru for a short spell. He kept a cleansheet on his debut on 16 November 2016 in a goalless draw against Goa, it was followed by a hattrick of cleansheets against Kerala Blasters, Chennaiyin and Delhi Dynamos. He conceded his first goals of the season with Mumbai City on 10 December, when they were defeated 3–2 by his former team ATK in first leg of semifinal. Three days later, he played his last match of the season for Mumbai City in the second leg against ATK, which ended in a 0–0 draw. Amrinder had an outstanding campaign as he was awarded with the best goalkeeper of the season award for keeping 5 cleansheets in 6 games.

==== 2017–2021 ====
Amrinder signed for Mumbai City on a permanent deal from Bengaluru in 2017. He played his first match of the 2017–18 Indian Super League on 19 November 2017 in a 2–0 loss against his former team Bengaluru. He kept his first clean sheet of the season on 10 December against Chennaiyin, which ended 1–0 to Mumbai. On 11 March 2018, Amrinder signed a three-year contract extension, that kept him at club until May 2021. He made 2 appearances in inaugural Super Cup where Mumbai lost to East Bengal 2–0 in round of 16.

Amrinder played his first match of the 2018–19 Indian against Jamshedpur on 2 October 2018, which ended in a 0–2 loss. He kept his first clean sheet on 19 October against local rivals FC Pune City in a 2–0 victory. 5 days later, Mumbai suffered a disastrous 5–0 loss against FC Goa with Amrinder in goal, as he also suffered an injury which ruled him out for next game. He captained his side for first time in a scoreless draw against his former team ATK on 25 November. He played his 50th ISL game in a 2–0 loss to Northeast United on 13 February 2019. Mumbai qualified for playoffs with Amrinder starting in both legs of semifinal but was defeated by FC Goa on an aggregate score of 5–2.

Amrinder played his first match of the 2019–20 Indian Super League on 24 October 2019 in a 0–1 away victory over Kerala Blasters, thus collecting his first clean sheet of the season. Mumbai lost their first match of the season with Amrinder on 31 October against Odisha FC which turned out to be a huge loss with a score of 2–4. He played in his 50th game for Mumbai in a 1–1 draw against Kerala Blasters on 5 December. He played his last match of the season against Chennaiyin FC on 21 February, which ended 0–1 to Chennaiyin.

Amrinder played his first match of the 2020–21 Indian Super League against NorthEast United on 21 November 2020, which ended in a 1–0 loss for Mumbai. He kept his first clean sheet of the season in a 0–1 victory over FC Goa on 25 November. Mumbai qualified for the playoffs where they defeated Goa 6–5 on penalties after a 2-2 aggregate score. He started in the final where Mumabi defeated ATK Mohun Bagan 2–1 to lift their first ever ISL trophy. Amrinder kept 10 clean sheets and made 61 saves in 2020–21 season. He played a pivotal role the club's success that season, as they won the Indian Super League Winners' Shield and Indian Super League trophy under his captaincy. Amrinder left the club after playing 84 matches for the club, making himself the most capped player in the history of Mumbai City FC until Bipin Singh Thounaojam overtook him in 2023.

=== ATK Mohun Bagan ===
On 31 May 2021, ATK Mohun Bagan FC announced the signing of Amrinder Singh on a five-year deal. He appeared with the club in 2021 AFC Cup group stage matches in Maldives where he kept a clean sheet against Bengaluru FC in a 2–0 win on his debut. ATK Mohun Bagan became the group winner of the South Asia Zone but lost in the Inter-zone play-off semi-finals against Uzbekistan club FC Nasaf 6–0. He played first game of 2021–22 Indian Super League in a 4–2 win over Kerala Blasters on 19 November. 8 days later, he kept his first cleansheet in 3–0 win over arch rivals East Bengal in Kolkata Derby. He played his 100th ISL game in a 1–1 draw against Chennaiyin on 11 December. ATK Mohun Bagan finished 3rd in the league stage but lost to Hyderabad FC in the Semi-finals on aggregate score of 3–2. In the campaign, the custodian kept 6 clean sheets in 22 matches. On 8 September 2022, he left ATK Mohun Bagan by mutual consent.

=== Odisha FC ===
==== 2022–23: Super Cup Victory ====
Amrinder joined Odisha FC ahead of the 2022–23 Indian Super League season on a one-year deal. He made his debut in first match against Jamshedpur FC in a 3–2 win. He assisted Pedro Martín's winner through a long ball in a 2–1 victory against Kerala Blasters on 23 October 2022. He played a big part in their success as they qualified for their first-ever Hero ISL playoffs but Odisha were knocked out by his former club and eventual champions ATK Mohun Bagan in playoffs losing 2–0. He made a total of 55 saves across 21 games while registering two clean sheets. He made a significant contribution in Super Cup and Odisha went on to win their first ever trophy since its inception defeating Bengaluru in the final 2–1. 4 days later, he played in the AFC Cup playoff against Gokulam Kerala in which Odisha secured a 3–1 victory and qualified for an Asian competition for first time ever. On 12 May 2023, Singh signed a contract extension with Odisha for 3 years lasting until at least 2026.

==== 2023–24 ====
In late July, He was part of the team which went to Thailand for pre-season for preparations for AFC Cup and ISL. He was later announced as the club captain for the season. He played his first match of the season in Odisha's continental debut in opening game of AFC Cup 4–0 loss to Mohun Bagan. He kept his first cleansheet of the season in first match of ISL season in a 2–0 win over Chennaiyin.

== International career ==
=== Youth ===
Amrinder represented India U23 during the 2014 Asian Games and was the starting keeper in both of India's games. He was named the captain for India U23s for the 2016 AFC U-23 championship qualifiers in Bangladesh and started in 2–0 loss to Uzbekistan U23 on 27 March 2015.

=== Senior team ===
He was then called up for the 2019 AFC Asian Cup qualifiers, but did not play any matches. On 19 August 2017, Singh made his international debut against Mauritius coming as a substitute at half time, which ended in a 2–1 win for India as he did not concede during his time in goal. He was then called up for the 2018 Intercontinental Cup. He made his first start for national team and only appearance in the tournament against New Zealand on 7 June 2018, which ended in a 1–2 defeat for India. After India qualified for the 2019 AFC Asian Cup, India announced their 23-man squad for the tournament, where Amrinder was called up as the backup goalkeeper. Amrinder was included in squad to take part in the 2019 King's Cup. He only played one match in the tournament, and that was against Thailand on 9 June 2019, which India won 0–1. In Intercontinental Cup, he played only in one game against North Korea in a 2–5 defeat and returned to bench for next game. He was called up for the Indian squad to compete in the 2022 FIFA World Cup qualifiers but played in no games.

He next played for the national team after a gap of 2 years in a 1–1 draw against Oman on 25 March 2021. Next, he played in a 2–1 win over Nepal on 5 September. After another one-and-a-half-year gap, he played in the first match of 2023 Tri-Nation Series against Myanmar in place of Gurpreet Singh Sandhu who had played in the 2023 Indian Super League final just 4 days ago and managed to keep a clean-sheet in a 1–0 win. He called up for Intercontinental cup and SAFF Championship. Coach Igor Stimac decided to play to Amrinder and Gurpreet on a rotation for both tournaments as India won both the tournaments with Amrinder keeping cleansheets against Mongolia, Lebanon and arch rivals Pakistan.

== Career statistics ==
=== Club ===
As of 1 March 2024

| Club | Season | League | | | Cup | | AFC | | Other | | Total | |
| Club | Season | Division | Apps | Goals | Apps | Goals | Apps | Goals | Apps | Goals | Apps | Goals |
|---|---|---|---|---|---|---|---|---|---|---|---|---|
| Pune | 2011–12 | I-League | 6 | 0 | 3 (Note: One appearance in Durand Cup, two appearances in Federation Cup) | 0 | — | | — | | 9 | 0 |
| Pune | 2012–13 | I-League | 5 | 0 | 5 (Note: Two appearances in Durand Cup, three appearances in Federation Cup) | 0 | — | | 0 | 0 | 10 | 0 |
| Pune | 2013–14 | I-League | 22 | 0 | 3 (Note: Appearances in Federation Cup) | 0 | 1 (Note: Appearance(s) in AFC Champions League) | 0 | — | | 26 | 0 |
| Pune | 2014–15 | I-League | 18 | 0 | 7 (Note: Three appearances in Durand Cup, four appearances in Federation Cup) | 0 | 5 (Note: Appearance(s) in AFC Cup) | 0 | 6 (Note: Appearances in King's Cup) | 0 | 36 | 0 |
| Pune | Total | | 51 | 0 | 18 | 0 | 6 | 0 | 6 | 0 | 81 | 0 |
| ATK (loan) | 2015 | Indian Super League | 13 | 0 | 0 | 0 | — | | — | | 13 | 0 |
| Bengaluru (loan) | 2015–16 | I-League | 11 | 0 | 2 (Note: Appearance(s) in Federation Cup) | 0 | 4 | 0 | — | | 17 | 0 |
| Bengaluru | 2016–17 | I-League | 12 | 0 | 3 | 0 | 8 (Note: One appearance in AFC Champions League, seven appearances in AFC Cup) | 0 | — | | 23 | 0 |
| Bengaluru | Bengaluru total | | 23 | 0 | 5 | 0 | 12 | 0 | 0 | 0 | 40 | 0 |
| Mumbai City (loan) | 2016 | Indian Super League | 6 | 0 | — | | — | | — | | 6 | 0 |
| Mumbai City | 2017–18 | Indian Super League | 16 | 0 | 2 (Note: Appearance(s) in Super Cup) | 0 | — | | — | | 18 | 0 |
| Mumbai City | 2018–19 | Indian Super League | 19 | 0 | 0 | 0 | — | | — | | 19 | 0 |
| Mumbai City | 2019–20 | Indian Super League | 18 | 0 | — | | — | | — | | 18 | 0 |
| Mumbai City | 2020–21 | Indian Super League | 23 | 0 | — | | — | | — | | 23 | 0 |
| Mumbai City | Total | | 82 | 0 | 2 | 0 | 0 | 0 | 0 | 0 | 84 | 0 |
| Mohun Bagan | 2021–22 | Indian Super League | 22 | 0 | — | | 6 | 0 | — | | 28 | 0 |
| Odisha | 2022–23 | Indian Super League | 21 | 0 | 4 | 0 | — | | 1 (Note: Appearance in play-offs for AFC Cup) | 0 | 26 | 0 |
| Odisha | 2023–24 | Indian Super League | 17 | 0 | 0 | 0 | 6 | 0 | — | | 21 | 0 |
| Odisha | Odisha total | | 36 | 0 | 4 | 0 | 6 | 0 | 1 | 0 | 47 | 0 |
| Career total | | | 228 | 0 | 29 | 0 | 30 | 0 | 7 | 0 | 294 | 0 |

=== International ===
As of 3 September 2024

Appearances and goals by national team and year
| India | 2017 | 1 | 0 |
| India | 2018 | 2 | 0 |
| India | 2019 | 2 | 0 |
| India | 2020 | 0 | 0 |
| India | 2021 | 2 | 0 |
| India | 2022 | 0 | 0 |
| India | 2023 | 6 | 0 |
| India | 2024 | 1 | 0 |
| Total | | 14 | 0 |

== Honours ==
India

- SAFF Championship: 2023
- Tri-Nation Series: 2017, 2023
- Intercontinental Cup: 2018, 2023
- King's Cup third place: 2019

Bengaluru

- I-League: 2015–16
- Federation Cup: 2016–17

Mumbai City

- Indian Super League: 2020–21
- Indian Super League winners shield: 2020–21

Odisha

- Super Cup: 2023

Individual

- I-League Golden Glove: 2015–16
- Indian Super League Golden Glove: 2016
- Tri-Nation Series Golden Glove: 2023
- Indian Super Cup Golden Glove: 2023
