= Felix D'Souza =

Indian footballer

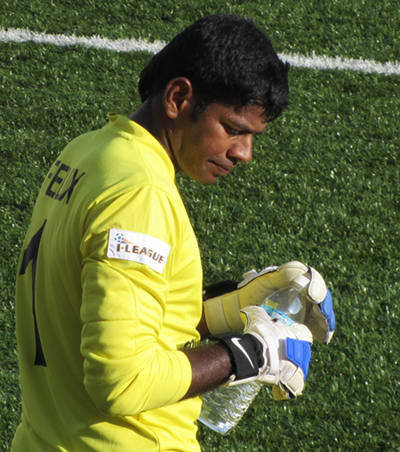

Personal information
- Full name: Felix D'Souza
- Date of birth: 25 March 1980 (age 46)
- Place of birth: Goa, India
- Height: 1.80 m (5 ft 11 in)
- Position: Goalkeeper

Team information
- Current team: Kerala Blasters (goalkeeping coach)

Senior career*
Years	Team	Apps	(Gls)
2005–2010	Sporting Goa	150	(0)
2011–2013	Churchill Brothers	64	(2)
2013–2015	Salgaocar	46	(3)

International career
2007-2012	India	6	(0)

Managerial career
- 2023–2025: Hyderabad FC (goalkeeping coach)
- 2024–2025: Malappuram FC (goalkeeping coach)
- 2025–2026: East Bengal FC (goalkeeping coach)
- 2026–: Kerala Blasters (goalkeeping coach)
- * Club domestic league appearances and goals

Felix D'Souza (born 25 March 1980) is an Indian football manager and former player who is the goalkeeping coach of the Indian Super League club Kerala Blasters.

== Honours ==
- SAFF Championship: 2005
