= Valeriano Rebello =

Indian footballer

Personal information
- Full name: Valeriano Joseph Rebello
- Date of birth: 5 March 1983 (age 43)
- Place of birth: Navelim, Goa, India
- Height: 1.75 m (5 ft 9 in)
- Position: Defender

Team information
- Current team: Mumbai
- Number: 18

Senior career*
| Years | Team | Apps | (Gls) |
| 2004–2013 | Dempo | | |
| 2013– | Mumbai | 4 | (0) |

International career
| 2011– | India | 2 | (0) |
- * Club domestic league appearances and goals

Valeriano Joseph Rebello (born 5 March 1983) is an Indian footballer who plays as a defender for Mumbai.
