= Riga Mustapha =

Dutch-Ghanaian footballer (born 1981)

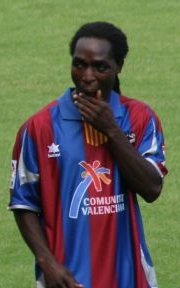
- Mustapha with Levante in 2007

Personal information
- Full name: Rahamat Riga Mustapha
- Date of birth: 10 October 1981 (age 45)
- Place of birth: Accra, Ghana
- Height: 1.82 m (6 ft 0 in)
- Position: Striker

Youth career
- Vitesse Arnhem

Senior career*
Years	Team	Apps	(Gls)
1998–2003	Vitesse Arnhem	31	(1)
2000–2001	→ RBC Roosendaal (loan)	8	(0)
2003–2005	Sparta Rotterdam	68	(26)
2005–2008	Levante	104	(28)
2008–2011	Bolton Wanderers	18	(0)
2011	Cartagena	10	(0)
2013–2014	Pune	17	(7)
Total		256	(62)

International career
1996–1997	Netherlands U16	9	(2)
1997–1998	Netherlands U17	7	(1)
1998–2000	Netherlands U18	16	(1)
2000–2001	Netherlands U19	12	(1)
2001–2002	Netherlands U20	7	(1)
- * Club domestic league appearances and goals as of 08:35, 19 May 2014 (UTC)

Rahamat Riga Mustapha (born 10 October 1981) is a former professional footballer who last played as a striker for Pune F.C. in the Indian I-League. Born in Ghana, he represented the Netherlands at youth level.

== Club career ==
Born in Accra, Ghana, Mustapha began his career with Eredivisie side Vitesse as a youth and senior player. While with the Vitesse youth team, Mustapha actually worked under his future head coach at Sparta Rotterdam and Pune, Mike Snoei. He also went out on loan to RBC Roosendaal while with Vitesse. He then left Vitesse in 2003 to sign for Sparta Rotterdam in the Eerste Divisie. In his two seasons at Sparta, Mustapha scored a total of 30 goals.

In 2005, Mustapha left Sparta Rotterdam and the Netherlands to sign for Levante UD of the Segunda División on a free transfer. Mustapha stayed at the club till 2008 when he signed for Bolton Wanderers of the Premier League in England as a replacement for the departing El Hadji Diouf. However, after 2 1/2 seasons of failing to make an impact at Bolton, Mustapha was released by the club in January 2011 and eventually signed back in the Segunda División for Cartagena.

=== Pune ===
On 26 October 2013, after two seasons away from competitive football action, Mustapha signed for Pune F.C. of the I-League in India as a replacement for injured striker Raúl Fabiani. The move meant that he would reunite with his former coach Mike Snoei who is the current head coach of Pune. He made his debut for his new side on 2 November 2013 in a league match against Sporting Goa at the Duler Stadium. He played the full 90 minutes for Pune as the side went down 2–0. He then scored his first goal for Pune, and his career first since the 2007–08 La Liga season, against Salgaocar on 22 November 2013 from the penalty spot in the 60th minute to lead Pune to a 1–1 draw in the league. His second goal then came in the very next match against Dempo on 27 November 2013 in which his 51st-minute strike lead Pune to another 1–1 draw.

In the month of December, Mustapha then managed to find the net three times. His first goal that month came on the 11th against Rangdajied United in which he found the net in the 23rd minute to give Pune a 1–0 lead which they would eventually give up and lose 3–2. He then scored his second and third goals in the very next match against United in which his brace lead Pune to a 2–1 victory and a "man of the match" award for Mustapha.

== International career ==
Despite being born in Ghana, Mustapha has in the past represented the national youth teams of the Netherlands for over 90 times, making him one of few to have reached that mark.

== Career statistics ==
Appearances and goals by club, season and competition
Club	Season	League			Cup		League cup		Continental		Other		Total	
Club	Season	Division	Apps	Goals	Apps	Goals	Apps	Goals	Apps	Goals	Apps	Goals	Apps	Goals
Vitesse Arnhem	1998–99	Eredivisie	1	0	0	0	—		0	0	—		1	0
Vitesse Arnhem	1999–2000	Eredivisie	7	0	0	0	—		2	0	—		9	0
Vitesse Arnhem	2001–02	Eredivisie	6	1	0	0	—		—		—		6	1
Vitesse Arnhem	2002–03	Eredivisie	17	0	0	0	—		6	0	—		23	0
Vitesse Arnhem	Total		31	1	0	0	—		8	0	—		39	1
RBC Roosendaal (loan)	2000–01	Eredivisie	8	0	1	2	—		—		—		9	2
Sparta Rotterdam	2003–04	Eerste Divisie	32	4	2	0	—		—		6	0	40	4
Sparta Rotterdam	2004–05	Eerste Divisie	36	22	2	0	—		—		6	4	44	26
Sparta Rotterdam	Total		68	26	4	0	—		—		12	4	84	30
Levante	2005–06	Segunda División	38	11	0	0	—		—		—		38	11
Levante	2006–07	La Liga	33	9	2	0	—		—		—		35	9
Levante	2007–08	La Liga	33	8	2	2	—		—		—		35	10
Levante	Total		104	28	4	2	—		—		—		108	30
Bolton Wanderers	2008–09	Premier League	17	0	1	0	1	0	—		—		19	0
Bolton Wanderers	2009–10	Premier League	1	0	2	0	0	0	—		—		3	0
Bolton Wanderers	2010–11	Premier League	0	0	0	0	—		—		—		0	0
Bolton Wanderers	Total		18	0	3	0	1	0	—		—		22	0
FC Cartagena	2010–11	Segunda División	10	0	0	0	—		—		—		10	0
Pune	2013–14	I-League	17	7	3	1	—		6	3	—		26	11
Career total			256	62	15	5	1	0	22	3	12	4	298	74
