= Lamine Tamba =

Senegalese footballer (born 1985)

Personal information
- Date of birth: 20 December 1985 (age 40)
- Place of birth: Dakar, Senegal
- Height: 1.85 m (6 ft 1 in)
- Position: Defender

Team information
- Current team: Real Kashmir

Youth career
- 2003–2004: Marseille

Senior career*
Years	Team	Apps	(Gls)
2004–2005	Marseille	0	(0)
2006–2007	ES Wasquehal	0	(0)
2007–2010	Mahindra United	48	(0)
2010–2011	Pune	18	(0)
2011–2012	Air India	21	(0)
2012–2013	Churchill Brothers	8	(0)
2013–2014	Rangdajied United	22	(0)
2015	AS Douanes	7	(0)
2017	Real Kashmir	0	(0)
- * Club domestic league appearances and goals as of 21 January 2017

Lamine Tamba (born 20 December 1985) is a Senegalese professional footballer who plays as a defender. He spent most of his club career in India with teams competing in the I-League.

Tamba played for Churchill Brothers in the 2013 AFC Cup.
