= Lester Fernandez =

Indian footballer (born 1986)

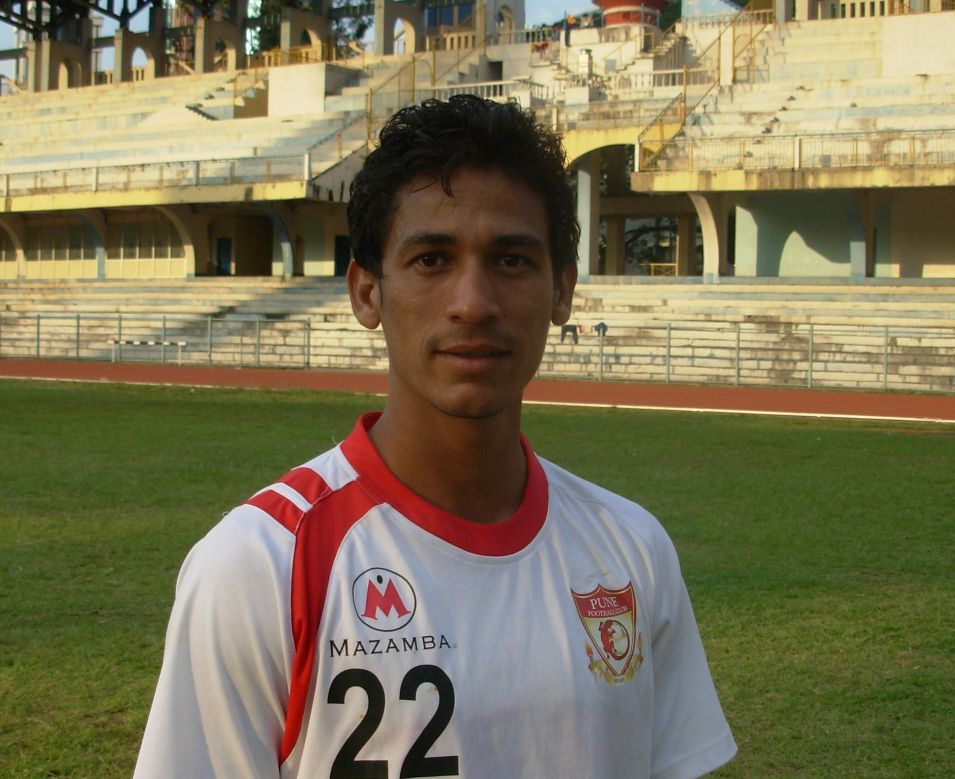

Personal information
- Date of birth: 6 December 1986 (age 39)
- Place of birth: Bangalore, Karnataka, India
- Height: 1.76 m (5 ft 9 1/2 in)
- Position: Attacking midfielder

Team information
- Current team: Kenkre
- Number: 22

Youth career
- 2003–2007: Tata FA

Senior career*
Years	Team	Apps	(Gls)
2007–2008	Dempo		
2008–2009	Vasco		
2009–2010	Salgaocar		
2010–2012	Pune		
2012–2013	United SC	11	(0)
2013	Mumbai Tigers	0	(0)
2014	Pune	1	(0)
2014	ATK	6	(0)
2015	Bharat	9	(0)
2019–	Kenkre	9	(2)

International career
2012	India	2	(0)

Managerial career
- SP Academy
- * Club domestic league appearances and goals as of 17:33, 28 March 2022 (UTC)

Lester Fernandez (born 6 December 1986), is an Indian professional footballer who plays as an attacking midfielder for Kenkre in the I-League. He is currently a football coach too.

== Club career ==
=== Early career ===
Born in Bangalore, Karnataka, Fernandez graduated from the Tata Football Academy in 2007. He then signed his first professional deal with Dempo of the I-League. He then signed for Vasco next season before signing with Salgaocar the next season in 2009.

He then signed for I-League side Pune F.C. in 2010. After the 2010–11 season, Fernandez was voted the Fans' Player of the Year.

=== Prayag United and Mumbai Tigers ===
On 11 June 2012 it was announced that Fernandez had been sold to fellow I-League side Prayag United for Rs 20 lakh. He made his debut for Prayag United on 7 October 2012 against Air India in a league match. He came on in the 82nd minute for C.K. Vineeth as Prayag United won 5–1.

After the 2012–13 season, Fernandez left Prayag United due to lack of playing time and signed for Mumbai Tigers who were expected to participate in the I-League for the 2013–14 season. However, before the season began, it was announced that Mumbai Tigers had dropped out of the I-League, meaning that Fernandez would not participate in the league.

=== Pune ===
On 18 February 2014 it was announced that Fernandez had re-signed with former club Pune. He made his return debut for the club on 19 February 2014 against Mohammedan. He came on as a 65th-minute substitute for Anthony D'Souza as Pune won 2–0.

=== Atletico de Kolkata ===
Fernandez was drafted by Indian Super League franchise Atlético de Kolkata in the 10th round. In his second match against Chennaiyin FC, he won the ISL Emerging player of the match award.

== International career ==
In February 2012 Fernandez was selected into India head coach Savio Medeira's 30-man squad. He then made his international debut for India on 23 February 2012 against Oman in which he started and played 56 minutes as India lost 5–1.

== Honours ==
Atlético de Kolkata

- Indian Super League: 2014
