= Baldeep Singh (footballer, born 1987) =

Indian footballer

Personal information
- Date of birth: 6 February 1987 (age 39)
- Place of birth: Hoshiarpur, Punjab, India
- Height: 1.75 m (5 ft 9 in)
- Position: Central midfielder

Youth career
- Mahilpur Academy
- JCT

Senior career*
Years	Team	Apps	(Gls)
2006–2011	JCT	55	(0)
2011	Salgaocar	11	(0)
2011–2012	Pune	14	(0)
2012–2014	United SC	13	(0)
2014	East Bengal	4	(0)

International career
- India U19
2009	India U23		
2008–2012	India	12	(0)
- * Club domestic league appearances and goals

Baldeep Singh (born 6 February 1987 in Hoshiarpur, Punjab) is an Indian former professional footballer who played as a central midfielder.

Singh absconded after he was accused of participation in the rape of a child in late October 2012.

== Career ==
=== JCT ===
Baldeep started his career at the Mahilpur Academy but moved on to JCT FC Academy after two years. He made his debut for JCT in 2006.

=== Salgaocar ===
Singh signed for Salgaocar S.C. of the I-League after the 2011 AFC Asian Cup. He played for the club for one season.

=== Pune ===
On 23 June 2011, it was announced that Singh had signed for Pune F.C. in the I-League. He made his debut on 8 September 2012 against East Bengal F.C. in the 2011 Indian Federation Cup; Pune lost by 1–2. He was part of the starting 11 against then Premier League team Blackburn Rovers F.C. in a friendly in Pune; Blackburn won by 3–0. He made his I-League debut against Shillong Lajong F.C. on 22 October 2011; the match ended 0–0.

=== Prayag United ===
On 9 May 2012, it was announced that Singh left Pune to join Prayag United S.C.

== International ==
Singh made his international debut for India on 1 August 2011 during the 2008 AFC Challenge Cup against Tajikistan at the Gachibowli Athletic Stadium in Hyderabad. India eventually went on to win the Asian Cup and qualify for the 2011 AFC Asian Cup after a 24-year gap. He was also in the squad during the 2009 SAFF Championship and came on as a substitute in most matches. However, he missed the final due to an injury. Baldeep made his first international start for India on 8 October 2010 against Vietnam.

=== International statistics ===
As of 4 July 2014

India national team
Year	Apps	Goals
2008	1	0
2009	0	0
2010	4	0
2011	2	0
2012	1	0
Total	8	0
