= Arup Debnath =

Indian footballer (born 1987)

Personal information
- Date of birth: 15 July 1987 (age 39)
- Place of birth: West Bengal, India
- Height: 1.86 m (6 ft 1 in)
- Position: Goalkeeper

Team information
- Current team: Mohammedan Sporting
- Number: 1

Youth career
- SAIL

Senior career*
Years	Team	Apps	(Gls)
2006–2008	East Bengal		
2008–2009	Air India		
2009–2010	East Bengal		
2010–2011	Air India	7	(0)
2011–2012	Kenkre		
2012–2013	Mumbai Tigers		
2013–2015	Pune	5	(0)
2016–17	NEROCA	10	(0)
2017–2018	Aizawl	2	(0)
2018–	Mohammedan Sporting		
- * Club domestic league appearances and goals as of 7 November 2017

Arup Debnath (Bengali: অরূপ দেবনাথ; born 15 July 1987) is an Indian professional footballer who plays as a goalkeeper for Hindustan FC in DSA Senior Division.

== Career ==
=== Early career ===
Born in West Bengal, Debnath began his career with the Steel Authority of India before beginning his professional career at East Bengal of the National Football League, However, due to being at the same club as other, more reputable keepers such as Naseem Akhtar, Subrata Pal, and Abhra Mondal, Debnath found playing time hard to come by and thus he decided to sign for Air India FC of the I-League in 2008. After one season with Air India in which Debnath was the club's #1 he decided to move back to East Bengal to try and cement more playing time, however, that was not meant to be and thus he re-signed for Air India before the 2010–11 season. Despite starting in the club's first seven league matches, Debnath had to miss the rest of the season after suffering an injury in a match against Pune F.C. in a collision with Mandjou Keita.

After recovering from his injury Debnath signed for Kenkre F.C. in the I-League 2nd Division for the 2012 season. Then after that Debnath signed for newly founded club Mumbai Tigers for the 2012–13 season. While with Tigers Debnath lead the club to the final of the 2012 Durand Cup where they lost to Debnath's former club Air India.

=== Pune ===
On 31 July 2013 it was announced that Debnath had signed with Pune F.C. of the I-League for the 2013–14 season. He made his debut for the club on 6 November 2013 against Bengaluru FC at the Balewadi Sports Complex where he started and kept a clean-sheet as Pune won 1–0.
