= Velington Rocha =

Indian footballer (born 1991)

Personal information
- Date of birth: 24 May 1991 (age 35)
- Place of birth: Salcette, Goa, India
- Height: 1.73 m (5 ft 8 in)
- Position: Midfielder

Youth career
- Sporting Goa
- 2009–2011: Pune

Senior career*
Years	Team	Apps	(Gls)
2011–2015	Pune	16	(0)
2011–2012	→ Margao (loan)		
- * Club domestic league appearances and goals as of 30 May 2015

Velington Rocha (born 24 May 1991) is an Indian professional footballer who plays as a midfielder.

== Career ==
=== Early career ===
Born in Salcette, Goa, Rocha started his career at the youth side of Sporting Clube de Goa where he stayed till 2009 when he joined the youth side of Pune. He then went on loan to Margao SC of the Goa Professional League during the 2011–12 season.

=== Pune ===
After spending a season at Margao, Rocha returned to Pune F.C. in the I-League and made his professional debut for the side in the league on 29 October 2012 against East Bengal F.C. at the Salt Lake Stadium. He came on in the 91st minute for Srikanth Ramu as Pune lost the match 1–0.

== Career statistics ==
As of 30 May 2015

Club	Season	League			Federation Cup		Durand Cup		AFC		Total	
Club	Season	Division	Apps	Goals	Apps	Goals	Apps	Goals	Apps	Goals	Apps	Goals
Pune	2012–13	I-League	7	0	0	0	0	0	—	—	7	0
Pune	2013–14	I-League	6	0	0	0	0	0	0	0	6	0
Pune	2014–15	I-League	3	0	0	0	0	0	0	0	3	0
Career total			16	0	0	0	0	0	0	0	16	0
