= Calum Angus =

English footballer (born 1986)

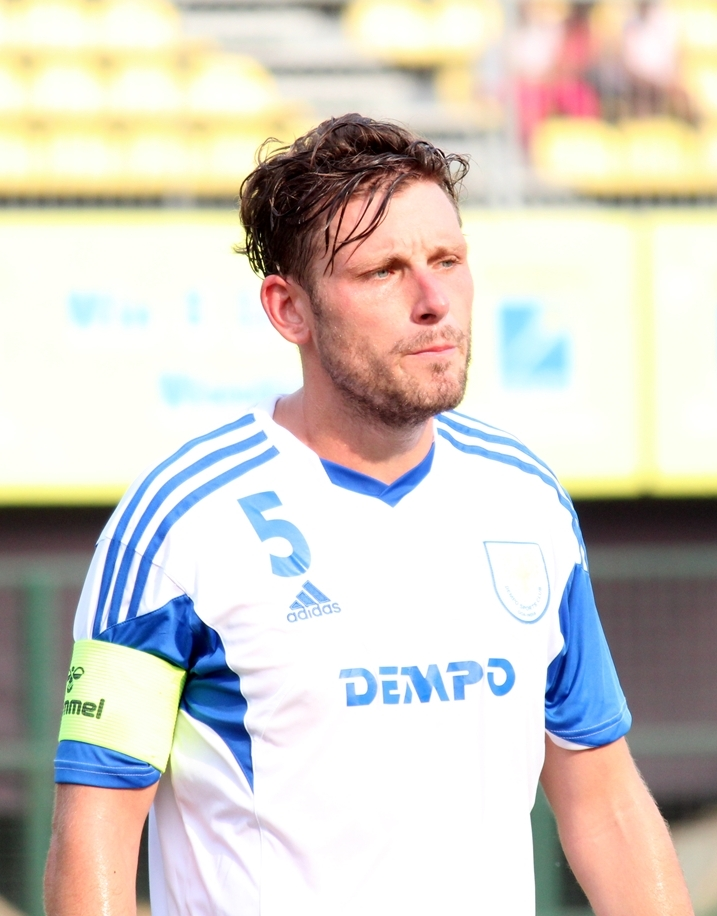
- Angus with Dempo in 2015

Personal information
- Full name: Calum James Angus
- Date of birth: 15 April 1986 (age 40)
- Place of birth: Greenwich, England
- Height: 1.85 m (6 ft 1 in)
- Position: Centre-back

Youth career
- 2000–2004: Portsmouth
- 2005–2008: Saint Louis Billikens

Senior career*
Years	Team	Apps	(Gls)
2007–2008	St. Louis Lions	8	(2)
2009	Wilmington Hammerheads	4	(1)
2009–2013	GAIS	72	(5)
2013–2014	Pune	21	(2)
2014–2015	Dempo	13	(1)
2016	East Bengal	9	(1)
Total		127	(12)
- * Club domestic league appearances and goals as of 16:53 7 November 2016 (UTC)

Calum James Angus (born 15 April 1986) is an English former professional footballer who played as a centre-back.

== Career ==
=== Wilmington Hammerheads ===
Angus was invited to the 2009 MLS Player Combine in Florida for the 2009 MLS SuperDraft. Due to a strong college career, numerous pundits and journalists predicted him to go reasonably high in the draft, so it was a surprise when he went undrafted. Major League Soccer side New York Red Bulls offered him a trial, but he declined. However, soon after he signed with USL-2 side Wilmington Hammerheads FC, a team in the 3rd tier of American league soccer.

=== GAIS ===
In June 2009 he went on a trial with Swedish side GAIS and on 8 July the club confirmed signing of Angus. Angus made his debut for GAIS against Halmstad BK on 12 July 2009. He came off the bench in the 81st minute and scored the equalizer for GAIS in the 90th minute of the match. Angus spent time training with West Ham United at the end of the 2011 Allsvenskan season. GAIS finished in last place and were relegated from the 2012 Allsvenskan. After their relegation the club announced that four of the players who were under contract would be allowed to leave for free, Angus being one of them. As he was unable to find a new club during the winter transfer window he remained at GAIS for the first half of the 2013 Superettan season before eventually leaving at the end of July.

=== Pune ===
On 7 August 2013 it was announced that Angus had signed for Pune F.C. of the I-League. He made his debut for the club on 21 September 2013 in the league against Mohammedan S.C. at the Salt Lake Stadium. Then, on 19 October 2013, he scored his first goal for the club against Churchill Brothers in which he found the net in the 52nd minute to give Pune a 1–0 victory. He then scored his second goal of the season in the very next match against Rangdajied United F.C. in which his 29th-minute goal led Pune to another 1–0 victory.

=== Dempo ===
Last season, Angus signed for another Indian club Dempo SC.

=== East Bengal ===
On season 2016 Angus signed for another Indian club East Bengal FC. He played all the matches in Calcutta Football League where East Bengal won the trophy And also Played in the 2016 Bordoloi Trophy Where He won Best Player of the tournament award. He was released before the start of the I-League and East Bengal FC signed Uganda defensive midfielder Bukenya as his replacement.

== Career statistics ==
As of 20 May 2015

Club	Season	League			Cup		Other		International		Total	
Club	Season	Division	Apps	Goals	Apps	Goals	Apps	Goals	Apps	Goals	Apps	Goals
Wilmington Hammerheads	2009	USL2	4	1	0	0	0	0	—	—	4	1
GAIS	2009	Allsvenskan	16	3	0	0	0	0	—	—	16	3
GAIS	2010	Allsvenskan	3	0	0	0	0	0	—	—	3	0
GAIS	2011	Allsvenskan	23	2	1	0	0	0	—	—	24	2
GAIS	2012	Allsvenskan	19	0	1	0	0	0	—	—	20	0
GAIS	2013	Superettan	11	0	0	0	0	0	—	—	11	0
GAIS	Total		72	5	2	0	0	0	0	0	74	5
Pune	2013–14	I-League	21	2	3	0	0	0	5	1	29	3
Dempo	2014–15	I-League	13	1	6	0	0	0	—	—	19	1
Career total			110	9	11	0	0	0	5	1	126	10
