= Shahinlal Meloly =

Indian footballer (born 1990)

Personal information
- Full name: Shahinlal Meloly
- Date of birth: 15 May 1990 (age 36)
- Place of birth: Calicut, Kerala, India
- Height: 1.80 m (5 ft 11 in)
- Position: Goalkeeper

Team information
- Current team: Chennaiyin
- Number: 36

Youth career
- 2008–2011: Viva Kerala

Senior career*
| Years | Team | Apps | (Gls) |
| 2012–2014 | Pune | 14 | (0) |
| 2014–2015 | Bharat FC | 3 | (0) |
| 2017 | Chennai City | 1 | (0) |
| 2017–2018 | Chennaiyin | 0 | (0) |
| 2019–2021 | Chennai City | 0 | (0) |

International career
| 2007 | India U19 | | |
- * Club domestic league appearances and goals as of 6 June 2018

Shahinlal Meloly (born 15 May 1990) is an Indian professional footballer who plays as a goalkeeper for Chennai City F.C. in the I-League.

== Career ==
Born in Calicut, Kerala, Meloly started his footballing career with Viva Kerala as a youth player in 2008. He then signed for Pune F.C. of the I-League in 2011. Then, in October 2011, Meloly gained fame when he was praised by former Blackburn Rovers manager Steve Kean after Pune took on the Premier League side in a friendly at the Balewadi Sports Complex. Kean said of Meloly that "He was brave. I think he pulled off a triple block at one stage. He is one the club should keep an eye on."

On 19 December 2014, he signed for I-League newcomers Bharat FC.

== International ==
Meloly was part of the India U19 side in 2007.

== Career statistics ==
As of 3 August 2017

| Club | Season | League | | | Federation Cup | | Durand Cup | | AFC | | Total | |
| Club | Season | Division | Apps | Goals | Apps | Goals | Apps | Goals | Apps | Goals | Apps | Goals |
|---|---|---|---|---|---|---|---|---|---|---|---|---|
| Pune | 2011–12 | I-League | 5 | 0 | 0 | 0 | 0 | 0 | — | — | 5 | 0 |
| Pune | 2012–13 | I-League | 9 | 0 | 0 | 0 | 0 | 0 | — | — | 9 | 0 |
| Pune | 2013–14 | I-League | 0 | 0 | 0 | 0 | 1 | 0 | 0 | 0 | 1 | 0 |
| Pune | Total | | 14 | 0 | 0 | 0 | 1 | 0 | 0 | 0 | 15 | 0 |
| Bharat FC | 2014–15 | I-League | 3 | 0 | 0 | 0 | 0 | 0 | — | — | 3 | 0 |
| Chennai City | 2016–17 | I-League | 3 | 0 | 1 | 0 | 0 | 0 | — | — | 4 | 0 |
| Chennaiyin | 2017–18 | Indian Super League | 0 | 0 | 0 | 0 | 0 | 0 | — | — | 0 | 0 |
| Career total | | | 20 | 0 | 1 | 0 | 1 | 0 | 0 | 0 | 22 | 0 |

== Honours ==
=== Club ===
Chennaiyin FC

- Indian Super League: 2017–18 Champions
