= Gabriel Fernandes =

Indian footballer (born 1988)

Personal information
- Full name: Gabriel Fernandes
- Date of birth: 22 April 1988 (age 38)
- Place of birth: Batim, Goa, India
- Position: Right winger

Team information
- Current team: FC Pune City
- Number: 14

Youth career
- Dempo
- Sporting Goa

Senior career*
Years	Team	Apps	(Gls)
2009–2012	Sporting Goa		
2012–2013	Mumbai	24	(4)
2013–2015	Dempo	13	(0)
2013–2014	→ Pune (loan)	9	(2)
2014	→ FC Goa (loan)	8	(0)
2015	Mumbai City	5	(0)
2016	Salgaocar	1	(0)
2017	Churchill Brothers	7	(0)
2017–2018	East Bengal	2	(1)
2018–2019	FC Pune City	0	(0)
2019–	Shrivenham		
- * Club domestic league appearances and goals as of 14:17,2 September 2018 (UTC)

Gabriel Fernandes (born 22 April 1988) is an Indian professional footballer who plays as a winger for English club Shrivenham in the Hellenic League.

== Career ==
=== Early career ===
Born in Porvorim, Goa, Fernandes began his career at Sporting Clube de Goa before joining Mumbai in the I-League. Fernandes made his debut for Mumbai on 6 October 2012 against Pailan Arrows at the Salt Lake Stadium. He came on as a 66th-minute substitute for Subhash Chakraborty as Mumbai lost 3–2. He then scored his first professional goal for Mumbai on 9 November 2014 against Sporting Goa on 9 November 2014 in which his 26th-minute strike was the first of three in a comeback from Mumbai as they won 3–2 after going down 2–0 earlier in the match.

=== Dempo ===
On 24 May 2013 it was announced that Fernandes had signed with Dempo of the I-League. Fernandes said that his reason for returning to the club where he spent part of his youth career was so he could remain close to family. He made his debut for Dempo on 22 September 2013 against Shillong Lajong at the Duler Stadium. He came on as an 82nd-minute substitute for Clifford Miranda as Dempo lost 3–0.

==== Pune (loan) ====
On 13 January 2014 it was confirmed that Fernandes had signed for Pune F.C. of the I-League on loan from Dempo for the rest of the season. He then made his debut for Pune the next day in the club's opening Federation Cup fixture against Eagles. He came on as a half-time substitute for Arata Izumi as Pune drew 1–1. Fernandes then scored his first goals for the club two games later against Churchill Brothers on 20 January 2014. He scored two in this match but they were not enough as Pune lost 3–2 and were thus knocked-out of the Federation Cup.

Fernandes then scored his first league goal for Pune on 19 February 2014 against Mohammedan as Pune won 2–0.

=== East Bengal ===
In June 2017, Fernandes signed for East Bengal. He made his debut for East Bengal in the I-League in a 7–1 home win against Chennai City on 24 February 2018. He came in as an 80th-minute substitute for Brandon Vanlalremdika and scored his first goal for the club in the 84th minute.

=== Shrivenham FC ===
In 2019, Farnandes moved to England and signed with Hellenic Football League outfit Shrivenham.

== Career statistics ==
As of 29 April 2017

Appearances and goals by club, season and competition
Club	Season	League			Federation Cup		Others		AFC		Total	
Club	Season	Division	Apps	Goals	Apps	Goals	Apps	Goals	Apps	Goals	Apps	Goals
Mumbai	2012–13	I-League	24	4	0	0	0	0	—	—	24	4
Dempo	2013–14	I-League	9	0	0	0	0	0	—	—	9	0
Pune (loan)	2013–14	I-League	9	2	3	2	0	0	5	1	17	5
FC Goa (loan)	2014	Indian Super League	8	0	—	—	—	—	—	—	8	0
Dempo	2014–15	I-League	9	0			0	0	—	—	9	0
Mumbai City	2015	Indian Super League	5	0	—	—	—	—	—	—	5	0
Salgaocar	2015–16	I-League	1	0			—	—	—	—	1	0
Churchill Brothers	2016–17	I-League	7	0			—	—	—	—	7	0
East Bengal	2017–18	I-League	2	1	1	0	7	1	—	—	10	2
Career total			74	7	4	2	7	1	5	1	90	11

== Honours ==
Sporting Clube dé Goa

- I-League 2nd Division runner-up: 2010–11

Dempo

- Indian Federation Cup: 2014–15

== See also ==
- List of Indian football players in foreign leagues
