= Raúl Fabiani =

Equatoguinean footballer (born 1984)

Personal information
- Full name: Raúl Iván Fabiani Bosio
- Date of birth: 23 February 1984 (age 42)
- Place of birth: Valencia, Spain
- Height: 1.98 m (6 ft 6 in)
- Position: Centre forward

Youth career
- Paterna
- Burjassot
- 2001–2003: Villarreal

Senior career*
Years	Team	Apps	(Gls)
2003–2004	Villarreal B		
2004–2005	Moralo		
2005–2006	Cacereño		
2006–2007	Lanzarote	19	(7)
2007–2008	Teruel	34	(12)
2008–2010	Villajoyosa	71	(22)
2010–2012	Alcoyano	39	(15)
2012–2013	Huracán	29	(7)
2013	Pune	2	(2)
2014	Huracán	11	(0)
2014–2015	Olímpic Xàtiva	11	(1)
2015	Marbella	12	(2)
2016	Castellón	5	(3)
2016	Hong Kong Sapling	5	(1)
2017	Hospitalet	12	(0)
2017	Buñol	5	(1)
2017–2018	La Nucía	2	(0)
2018	Águilas	11	(3)
2018–2019	Acero	28	(4)
2019–2020	Soneja	19	(11)
2020–2021	Vall de Uxó	15	(2)
2022	Mare Nostrum	4	(1)

International career
2012–2015	Equatorial Guinea	11	(0)
- * Club domestic league appearances and goals as of 20 February 2022

Raúl Iván Fabiani Bosio (born 23 February 1984) is a former professional footballer who played as a centre forward.

Fabiani spent most of his extensive career in Spain, representing Alcoyano in Segunda División. He also played professionally in India and Hong Kong.

Born and raised in Spain to an Italian father and an Equatorial Guinean mother, Fabiani capped for the Equatorial Guinea national team.

== Early life ==
Fabiani was born in Valencia, Spain to an Italian father and an Equatorial Guinean mother related to Edmundo Bossio Dioko, a politician executed during the regime of Francisco Macías Nguema.

== Club career ==
Fabiani spent most of his senior career in the lower levels of Spanish football, mainly competing in the Valencian Community. He made his Segunda División debut in the 2011–12 season at the age of already 27, with CD Alcoyano, after having scored 12 Segunda División B goals the previous campaign to help the team return to the second level after an absence of 42 years; his first game in the second level of Spanish football occurred on 22 October 2011 as he came on as a late substitute in a 1–4 home loss against FC Barcelona B, and he netted his first and second goals in the competition on 27 May of the following year to contribute decisively to a 4–0 home win over Elche CF, but his team had already sealed their relegation.

Fabiani also represented Villarreal CF B, Moralo CP, CP Cacereño, UD Lanzarote, CD Teruel, Villajoyosa CF and Huracán Valencia CF. On 5 August 2013 the 29-year-old moved teams and countries, signing with Pune F.C. in India.

On 21 September 2013, Fabiani made his debut in the I-League, which was an eventful affair as he scored two goals, provided one assist and was also sent off after 77 minutes of play for a second bookable offence. He later sustained an injury while playing against Mohun Bagan AC which ruled him out for four months, so on 26 October he was released and replaced by Riga Mustapha, returning to former club Huracán.

In the following years, safe for a very brief spell in the Hong Kong First Division League, Fabiani continued to compete in Spanish lower league and amateur football. On 19 June 2019, he signed with CD Soneja of the Valencian regional leagues.

== International career ==
Fabiani received his first call for Equatorial Guinea, on 29 January 2011, but he did not play in the friendly match with Congo on 9 February. The following month he was called for another exhibition game, this time against Gambia, but again he stayed on the verge of his international debut. These factors led to discomfort at Alcoyano because the club had lost him for four league matches (two for each international match), which led to the organization asking the player to reject international calls for the remainder of the season; thus, he rejected to appear for the pre-Olympic national team in two qualifying matches against Nigeria in April 2011.

Subsequently, Fabiani ceased to be called until Henri Michel, who at the same time gave little importance to the Spanish-born players, resigned from his position as national team coach. After the departure of the Frenchman and before the Brazilian's Gílson Paulo arrival at Malabo as his replacement, the player was included in the preliminary list for the 2012 Africa Cup of Nations.

Fabiani did not play in the goalless friendly match with South Africa on 6 January 2012, appearing shortly after in a non-FIFA recognized match against Cameroonian club Coton Sport FC de Garoua. He was confirmed in the roster of 23 players for the CAN tournament, played on home soil, only being fielded by the eventual quarter-finalists in the last group stage game, a 0–1 loss to Zambia.

== Career statistics ==
=== Club ===
As of 8 May 2014

Club	Season	League			National Cup		Other		Total	
Club	Season	Division	Apps	Goals	Apps	Goals	Apps	Goals	Apps	Goals
Lanzarote	2006–07	Segunda División B	19	7	0	0	0	0	19	7
Teruel	2007–08	Tercera División	34	19	0	0	0	0	34	19
Villajoyosa	2008–09	Tercera División	37	11	0	0	0	0	37	11
Villajoyosa	2009–10	Segunda División B	34	12	2	0	0	0	36	12
Villajoyosa	Total		71	23	2	0	0	0	73	13
Alcoyano	2010–11	Segunda División B	28	12	0	0	4	1	32	13
Alcoyano	2011–12	Segunda División	7	2	0	0	0	0	7	2
Alcoyano	Total		35	14	0	0	4	1	39	15
Huracán	2012–13	Segunda División B	24	5	1	0	5	2	30	7
Pune	2013–14	I-League	2	2	0	0	0	0	2	2
Huracán	2013–14	Segunda División B	11	0	0	0	0	0	11	0
Career total			196	70	3	0	9	3	208	73
