= Prakash Thorat =

Indian footballer (born 1985)

Personal information
- Date of birth: 11 May 1985 (age 41)
- Place of birth: Pune, Maharashtra, India
- Height: 1.78 m (5 ft 10 in)
- Position: Forward

Senior career*
Years	Team	Apps	(Gls)
- Deccan XI
- Maharashtra Police
- Central Railways
2012–2013	Air India	27	(5)
2013–2015	Pune	18	(0)
2016	DSK Shivajians	3	(0)
- * Club domestic league appearances and goals as of 10 May 2015

Prakash Thorat (born 11 March 1985) is an Indian professional footballer who played as a forward.

== Career ==
=== Early career ===
Born in Pune, Maharashtra, Thorat started his footballing career as a semi-professional, playing for various Maharashtra state clubs like Deccan XI, Maharashtra Police, and Central Railways. He was also twice the top scorer in the Nagpur Premier League in both the 2010 and 2011 seasons in which he scored seven goals in each season. His best moment as a semi-professional came when he played in the inaugural Aurangabad Premier League where he scored an amazing 13 goals in only five matches.

After impressing as a semi-professional Thorat was signed by I-League side Air India for the rest of the 2011–12 season. He made his debut for Air India on 14 April 2012 against Pailan Arrows at the Salt Lake Stadium. He managed to score a brace in that match as Air India won 2–0. Overall, Thorat played in seven matches that season and then in the 2012–13 I-League season he made 20 appearances while scoring only three goals. While with Air India Thorat was played mainly as a winger.

=== Pune ===
On 7 June 2013 it was announced that Thorat had signed for hometown club Pune F.C. in the I-League on a two-year deal. He made his debut for the club during the 2013 Durand Cup on 9 September 2013 against Army Red in which he started and played only 24 minutes as Pune lost the match 2–0. He then made his league debut for Pune on 11 December 2013 against Rangdajied United when he came on as an 88th-minute substitute for Thongkhosiem Haokip as Pune lost 3–2.

== I-League statistics ==
As of 9 May 2014

Club	Season	League			Federation Cup		Durand Cup		AFC		Total	
Club	Season	Division	Apps	Goals	Apps	Goals	Apps	Goals	Apps	Goals	Apps	Goals
Air India	2011–12	I-League	7	2	0	0	0	0	—	—	7	2
Air India	2012–13	I-League	20	3	0	0	0	0	—	—	20	3
Air India	Total		27	5	0	0	0	0	0	0	27	5
Pune	2013–14	I-League	6	0	0	0	1	0	2	0	8	0
2014–15	I-League	12	0	0	0	0	0	0	0	12	0	
Total		18	0	0	0	1	0	2	0	21	5	
Career total			45	5	0	0	1	0	2	0	48	5
