= Anthony D'Souza =

Indian footballer (born 1987)

Personal information
- Date of birth: 2 March 1987 (age 39)
- Place of birth: Siolim, Goa, India
- Height: 1.68 m (5 ft 6 in)
- Position: Left winger

Team information
- Current team: Goa
- Number: 13

Youth career
- SESA FA
- 2006–2010: Sporting Goa
- 2007–2008: → Velsao Pale (loan)

Senior career*
Years	Team	Apps	(Gls)
2009–2012	Sporting Goa		(6)
2012–2013	Salgaocar	3	(0)
2013–2015	Pune	24	(3)
2017	Churchill Brothers	11	(1)
2017–	Goa	0	(0)
- * Club domestic league appearances and goals as of 1 November 2017

Anthony D'Souza (born 2 March 1987) is an Indian professional footballer who plays as a left winger for Goa.

== Career ==
=== Early career ===
Born in Siolim, Goa, D'Souza started his football career at the SESA Football Academy before joining the youth team of Sporting Clube de Goa in 2006. During the 2007–08 season he was loaned out to Velsao Pale. D'Souza then made his I-League debut with Sporting Goa on the last day of the 2009–10 I-League season against Chirag United on 28 May 2010 in which he also managed to score his first professional goal as Sporting Goa won 1–0 but were still relegated to the I-League 2nd Division. However, despite relegation, D'Souza stayed on with the club and helped them back to the I-League for the 2011–12 season in which he scored five goals.

D'Souza then signed for Salgaocar in 2012 and during the 2012 Indian Federation Cup scored in all three of the clubs group stage matches to end the tournament as the second top scorer among Indians that year.

=== Pune ===
After spending one season at Salgaocar D'Souza signed for Pune F.C. in the I-League on 15 July 2013. He then made his debut for the club on 29 September 2013 against Shillong Lajong when he came on as an 88th-minute substitute for Nikhil Kadam as Pune drew the match 0–0. While training with the India national team in March 2015 D'Souza suffered a severe ankle injury that kept him out for most of the 2015 season.

=== Churchill Brothers ===
He made a comeback to football from his ankle injury for Churchill Brothers against Mohun Bagan in second half playing for 35 minutes. He has been used as a second half impact player by coach.

== Career statistics ==
As of 9 March 2015

Club	Season	League			Federation Cup		Durand Cup		AFC		Total	
Club	Season	Division	Apps	Goals	Apps	Goals	Apps	Goals	Apps	Goals	Apps	Goals
Salgaocar	2012–13	I-League	3	0	4	3	0	0	—	—	7	3
Pune	2013–14	I-League	20	2	3	0	0	0	5	1	28	3
Pune	2014–15	I-League	4	1	4	0	0	0	—	—	8	1
Career total			27	3	11	3	0	0	5	1	43	7
