= James Meyer (footballer) =

Australian soccer player (born 1986)

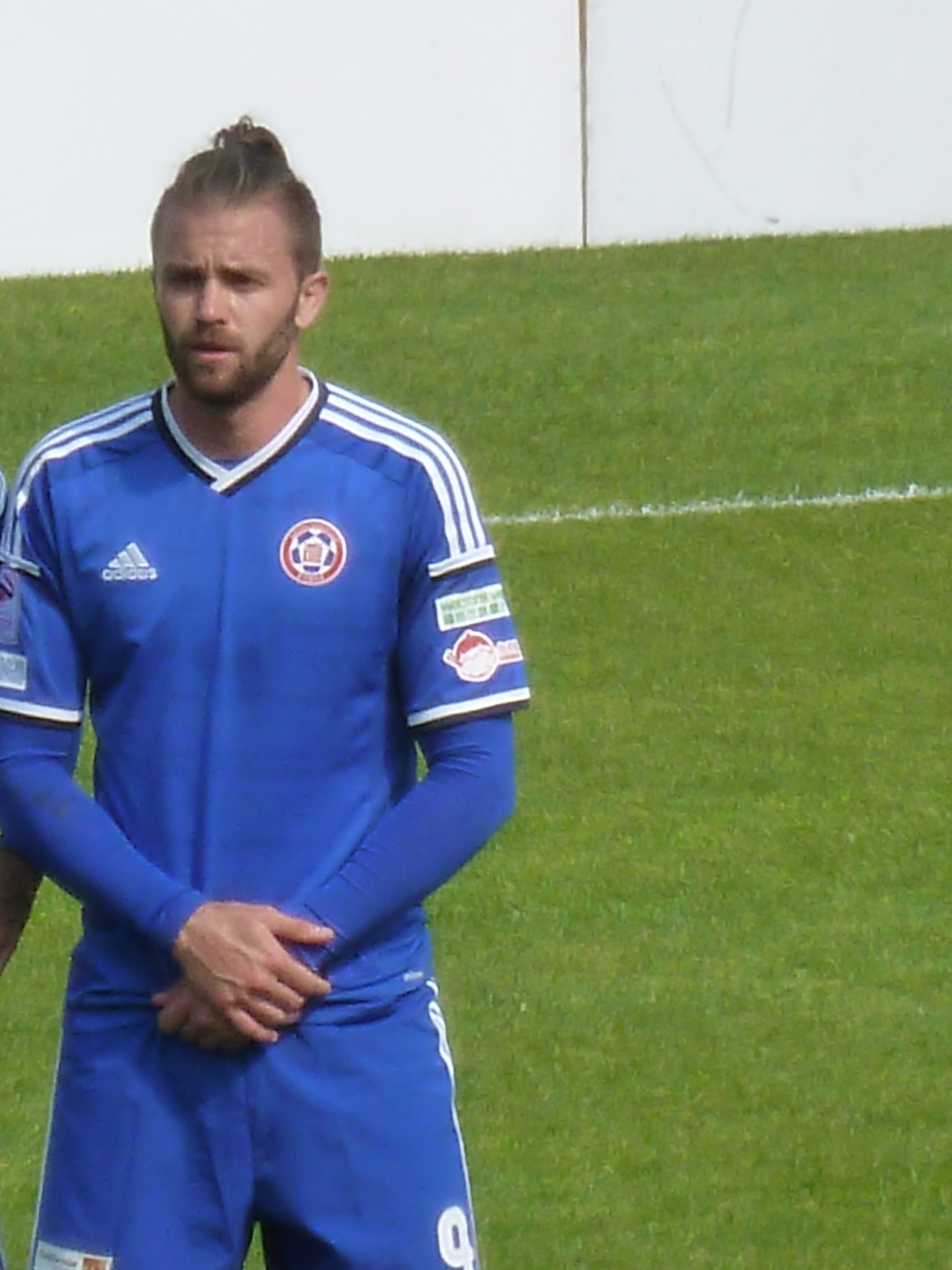
- Meyer with Eastern in 2016

Personal information
- Date of birth: 28 May 1986 (age 40)
- Place of birth: Sydney, Australia
- Height: 1.78 m (5 ft 10 in)
- Position: Midfielder

Team information
- Current team: Eastern Suburbs

Youth career
- 2005–2006: Brisbane City
- 2006–2007: Bohemians
- 2007–2008: Hertha Berlin

Senior career*
Years	Team	Apps	(Gls)
2008–2009	Olympic		
2010	Eastern Suburbs	16	(6)
2010–2013	Brisbane Roar	21	(6)
2013–2014	Pune	11	(3)
2015	Yadanarbon		
2016	Eastern	4	(0)
2018–2019	Brisbane City	37	(7)
2020–	Eastern Suburbs	16	(8)
- * Club domestic league appearances and goals as of 2 December 2020

James Meyer (born 28 May 1986) is an Australian professional soccer player who plays as a midfielder for National Premier Leagues Queensland club Brisbane City.

== Career ==
=== Early career ===
Born in Sydney, Meyer started his youth career with Brisbane City FC in 2005. The following year Meyer went to Europe and signed on as a youth player for Bohemian F.C. of Ireland and then Hertha BSC of Germany the next year. He then returned to Australia in 2008 to play for Olympic FC of the Queensland State League before joining Eastern Suburbs F.C. of the Brisbane Premier League.

=== Brisbane Roar ===
On 30 June 2010, after being spotted in the Brisbane Premier League by future Australia coach Ange Postecoglou, Meyer was handed a trial with the Brisbane Roar FC of the A-League – the top tier soccer league in Australia. After the trial Meyer was handed a one-year deal with the Roar with Postecoglou saying "I watched James a couple of times ... he can play a number of positions for us, he's quick and he's good technically".

Meyer then made his professional debut for the Roar on 12 January 2011 against the Central Coast Mariners at Central Coast Stadium. He came off the bench for the Roar in the 75th minute for Erik Paartalu and eventually scored the equalizing goal for the Roar which led to them drawing the match 3–3 in the 78th minute, three minutes after coming on. Meyer then scored his first brace in his next match against the Wellington Phoenix on 26 January 2011. He came on as a 72nd-minute substitute for Mitch Nichols and then went on to score in the 83rd and 89th minutes of the game to grant the Roar a late 2–0 victory. He then scored his fourth goal of his career and that very month on 29 January 2011 against the Melbourne Heart in which he found the net in the 62nd minute to hand the Roar a 2–1 win.

The next season Meyer scored his one and only goal on 19 November 2011 against the Newcastle Jets. He came off the bench in the 79th minute for Henrique and then found the net five minutes later in the 84th minute to lead the Brisbane Roar to a 2–1 victory. Meyer then made his club international debut in the AFC Champions League on 6 March 2012 against FC Tokyo of the J.League in Japan when he came off the bench in the 79th minute for Henrique. The Roar eventually went on to lose that match 2–0.

Meyer scored his final goal for the Brisbane Roar on 26 January 2013 against Perth Glory at nib Stadium. He started this match and scored the goal in the 16th minute which would turn out to be the only goal in that match as the Roar won 1–0. His final match for the Roar came in the AFC Champions League play-off match against Buriram United at the New I-Mobile Stadium on 13 February 2013. He came on as a 116th-minute substitute for Ben Halloran and then missed from the penalty spot in the penalty shoot-out which saw Buriram United advance to the group stages of Asia's top competition as 3–0 winners.

After the conclusion of the 2012–13 A-League season Meyer was released from the Brisbane Roar, along with Stef Nijland and Matthew Jurman.

=== Pune ===
On 13 August 2013 it was announced that Meyer had signed with Pune of the I-League in India as the club's fourth foreigner for the 2013–14 I-League season. He then made his debut for the Indian side on 21 September 2013 against Mohammedan at the Salt Lake Stadium. He started this match and played the full 90 minutes and even scored his first goal for the club in the 52nd minute to help Pune to an opening day 3–1 victory.

His second goal for the club came on 10 October 2013 against Mohun Bagan at the Balewadi Sports Complex in which his 79th-minute strike helped Pune to a 2–0 victory. Meyer then scored his third goal for the club on 6 November 2013 against Bengaluru FC in which his 71st minute proved to be the deciding goal in a 1–0 victory.

== Career statistics ==
As of 19 February 2014

Club	Season	League			League Cup		Domestic Cup		AFC		Total	
Club	Season	Division	Apps	Goals	Apps	Goals	Apps	Goals	Apps	Goals	Apps	Goals
Brisbane Roar	2010–11	A-League	3	4	0	0	—	—	—	—	3	4
Brisbane Roar	2011–12	A-League	13	1	0	0	—	—	5	0	18	1
Brisbane Roar	2012–13	A-League	5	1	0	0	—	—	1	0	6	0
Brisbane Roar	Total		21	6	0	0	0	0	6	0	27	6
Pune	2013–14	I-League	11	3	3	0	0	0	1	0	15	3
Career total			32	9	3	0	0	0	7	0	42	9

== Honours ==
Brisbane Roar

- A-League: 2010–11, 2011–12, 2012–13, 2011–12

Yadanarbon

- Myanmar National League: 2014

Eastern

- Hong Kong Premier League: 2015–16
