= Abhra Mondal =

Indian footballer and coach

Personal information
- Full name: Abhra Mondal
- Date of birth: 14 July 1986 (age 40)
- Place of birth: Kolkata, India
- Height: 1.80 m (5 ft 11 in)
- Position: Goalkeeper

Senior career*
Years	Team	Apps	(Gls)
2005–2012	East Bengal	87	(0)
2011–2012	→ Pune (loan)	11	(0)
2012–2013	Pune	19	(0)
2013–2017	East Bengal	15	(0)
2017	Chennai City	3	(0)
2017–2018	Bengaluru FC	1	(0)
2018	East Bengal		

Managerial career
- 2019–2020: East Bengal (goalkeeping coach)
- * Club domestic league appearances and goals

Abhra Mondal (Bengali: অভ্র মন্ডল; born 14 July 1986) is an Indian goalkeeper coach and former footballer who played as a goalkeeper.

== Career ==
=== East Bengal ===
Mondal signed for East Bengal FC in 2005 and ever since Mondal has mostly been used in the Federation Cup matches. After a spending two years at Pune, Mondal returned to East Bengal for the 2013–14 season.

=== Loan to Pune ===
On 24 November 2011 Mondal was officially loaned out by East Bengal to fellow I-League club Pune F.C. for the 2011-12 I-League season. He then made his debut for Pune against Air India FC in the I-League and helped Pune to the 2–0 victory. In his short stint, till he suffered a shin bone injury in a match against Lajong FC, he ensured that his side remained unbeaten in all the matches he played in I-League.

=== Pune F.C ===
On 11 July 2012, he signed a full contract with the club. This came after an impressive 11-match unbeaten streak and turned out to be hailed as the biggest protagonist in the club's record and longest unbeaten run ever in the I-League.

=== Bengaluru FC ===
He was picked by Bengaluru FC on 23 July 2017 in ISL draft.
