= 2012–13 Dempo SC season =

Indian football club season

Dempo
2012-13 season
- Chairman: Srinivas Dempo
- Manager: Armando Colaco
- Stadium: Duler Stadium
- I-League: 5th
- Federation Cup: Runners-up
Home colours	Away colours

The 2012–13 Dempo S.C. season was the club's 45th season since their formation in 1967 and their 15th season ever in the I-League, India's top football league.

== Transfers ==
In:

Out:

Note: Flags indicate national team as has been defined under FIFA eligibility rules. Players may hold more than one non-FIFA nationality.

No.	Pos.	Nation	Player
—	DF	GHA	Stephen Ofei (from (Israel) Maccabi Be'er Sheva)
—	DF	IND	Nickson Castana (from Wilred Lesiure)
—	MF	ENG	Rohan Ricketts (unattached)
—	FW	JPN	Ryuji Sueoka (from Salgaocar)
—	MF	LBR	Johnny Menyongar (on loan from Shillong Lajong)
—	DF	IND	Prathamesh Maulingkar (on loan from Pailan Arrows)

No.	Pos.	Nation	Player
—	GK	IND	Luis Barreto (on loan to Mumbai)
—	DF	IND	John Dias (to Air India)
—	DF	IND	Micky Fernandes (to Air India)
—	DF	IND	William Colaco (to Mumbai)
—	MF	IND	Dominic Noronha (to Salgaocar)
—	MF	IND	Brian Mascarenhas (to Salgaocar)
—	MF	JPN	Yusuke Kato (to (Thailand) BEC Tero Sasana)
—	MF	TTO	Densill Theobald (released)
—	FW	IND	Anil Kumar (to Mohun Bagan)
—	FW	NGR	Ranti Martins (to Prayag United)
—	DF	GHA	Stephen Ofei (released)
—	MF	ENG	Rohan Ricketts (released)

== Federation Cup ==
Dempo began their season by participating in the 2012 Indian Federation Cup and the club was placed in Group A alongside Pailan Arrows, Mumbai, and Shillong Lajong. Dempo began their Federation Cup campaign with a draw against Pailan Arrows on 19 September 2012 with Clifford Miranda scoring the equalizer for Dempo after Holicharan Narzary scored the first goal of the match for Pailan in the 52nd minute. Dempo then won their first match of the tournament when they defeated Shillong Lajong F.C. by a score of 1–0 with Clifford Miranda again being the scorer for the club in the 45th minute right before half-time. Dempo then confirmed their place into the semi-finals of the Federation Cup in style on 23 September 2012 against Mumbai F.C. with a 4–0 victory over the Maharashtra club with Clifford Miranda scoring his third goal of the tournament in the 23rd minute before Nigerian Koko Sakibo scored a hat-trick with goals coming in the 43rd, 79th, and 90th minutes of the game.

In the semi-finals Dempo took on Salgaocar F.C. in Siliguri on 28 December 2012 and won the match 2–0 with goals from Joaquim Abranches in the 70th and Koko Sakibo in the 84th minute as Dempo booked their place in the Final. Then in the final Dempo lost to East Bengal F.C. 3–2 after Climax Lawrence gave Dempo the 51st-minute lead before East Bengal scored three through Arnab Mondal, Manandeep Singh, and Chidi Edeh in the 60th, 100th, and 109th minute respectively and Mahesh Gawli scored the consolation for Dempo in the 111th minute.

19 September 2012 Group Stage	Dempo	1 – 1	Pailan Arrows	Jamshedpur, Jharkhand
15:00 IST	Miranda 60'	Report	Narzary 52'	Stadium: JRD Tata Sports Complex

21 September 2012 Group Stage	Dempo	1 – 0	Shillong Lajong	Jamshedpur, Jharkhand
15:00 IST	Miranda 45'	Report		Stadium: JRD Tata Sports Complex

23 September 2012 Group Stage	Mumbai	0 – 4	Dempo	Jamshedpur, Jharkhand
15:00 IST		Report	Miranda 23'; Sakibo 43', 79', 90'	Stadium: Keenan Stadium

28 September 2012 Semi-Finals	Dempo	2 – 0	Salgaocar	Siliguri, West Bengal
18:30 IST	Abranches 70'; Sakibo 84'	Report		Stadium: Kanchenjunga Stadium

30 September 2012 Final	East Bengal	3 – 2	Dempo	Siliguri, West Bengal
19:00 IST	Mondal 60'; Singh 100'; Edeh 109'	Report	Lawrence 51'; Gawli 111'	Stadium: Kanchenjunga Stadium

== I-League ==
Dempo then began their 2012–13 I-League season as the defending champions on 6 October 2012 against Churchill Brothers S.C. at the Fatorda Stadium in Margao, Goa in which Dempo won the match 2–1 with their goals coming from the club's newest Japanese signing Ryuji Sueoka in the 2nd and 75th minute while former midfielder and captain of the side, Beto scored the equalizer for Churchill Brothers in the 47th minute. Dempo then won their second match of the season on 12 October 2012 against Sporting Clube de Goa in a huge 5–0 victory with Anthony Pereira scoring early in the 15th minute before Ryuji Sueoka scoring his third goal of the season in the 22nd minute, then Clifford Miranda got his I-League goalscoring campaign to a good start with two goals in the 69th and 74th minutes of the match and Nigerian Koko Sakibo finished the match off in the 93rd minute with a goal from the penalty spot. Dempo then finished their first month of the I-League with their first away victory of the season on 28 October 2012 when they defeated promoted newcomers United Sikkim F.C. 2–1 with Koko Sakibo scoring the first goal of the match in the 20th minute before Salau Nuruddin scored the equalizer in the 59th minute and Ryuji Sueoka scored the winner from the penalty spot in the 93rd minute.

Dempo then started the month of November with a Federation Cup Final rematch against East Bengal F.C. on 3 November 2012 at the Salt Lake Stadium in Kolkata, West Bengal with the score ending in a draw again after 90 minutes with Chidi Edeh giving East Bengal the lead in the 31st minute from the penalty spot before Dempo scored the equalizer from Peter Carvalho in the 82nd minute. Dempo however then went back to winning ways with a resounding 4–1 victory over Shillong Lajong F.C. at the Fatorda Stadium on 10 November 2012 with Ryuji Sueoka scoring 2 minutes into stoppage time of the first half while Clifford Miranda added to the score in the 50th minute before Jibon Singh brought a goal back for Shillong Lajong but a Ryuji Sueoka penalty goal in the 91st minute and Anthony Pereira goal in the 98th minute confirmed Dempo's huge win. Dempo then however suffered a huge set-back when they surprisingly lost to newly promoted ONGC F.C. at the Ambedkar Stadium in Delhi 3–1 with Creson Antao scoring the only goal for Dempo in the 61st minute. Dempo though managed to come back in their next match against Air India FC at the Fatorda Stadium with a 1–0 victory after Joaquim Abranches scored late in the 90th minute to get the victory for the Whites. Dempo then ended the month with a victory over Mohun Bagan A.C. at the Fatorda Stadium by a score of 3–0 with Joaquim Abranches scoring in the 40th minute before Ryuji Sueoka scored in the 45th minute from the spot and Godwin Franco finished the game off in the 70th minute with a striker from yards out. However the result of this match was cancelled as Mohun Bagan were banned from the I-League for 2 years.

The club then began the month of December with a victory against Salgaocar F.C. on 1 December 2012 after summer signing, Englishmen Rohan Ricketts, scored in the 29th minute for Dempo before Sean Rooney scored the equalizer in the 59th minute and Ryuji Sueoka scored the winner in the 84th minute. Dempo then almost suffered a scare in their last match against Prayag United S.C. when they went down after 21 minutes with former striker Ranti Martins scoring for Prayag but Dempo came back with three goals from Ryuji Sueoka, Peter Carvalho, and Climax Lawrence in the 36th, 77th, and 78th minutes respectively. The club though however suffered their second loss of the season when they lost 5–1 to Pune F.C. at the Fatorda Stadium with Joaquim Abranches scoring the only goal for Dempo in the 23rd minute. Despite the loss though Dempo came back in their next match against Pailan Arrows on 22 December 2012 at the Salt Lake Stadium with a 2–1 victory due to a brace from Joaquim Abranches in the 10th and 59th minutes of the match while Milan Singh scored for Pailan Arrows. The club then ended the month of December and the year 2012 with a draw against Mumbai F.C. at the Balewadi Sports Complex on 30 December 2012.

The club then began the new year and January against Prayag United on 4 January 2013 at the Kalyani Stadium in West Bengal in which the club lost 1–0 thanks to a 90th minute free-kick goal from Costa Rican international Carlos Hernández. Dempo then continued what was by their standards a very weak game after the club drew 0–0 between the relegation contenders, Shillong Lajong, in Shillong on 13 January 2013. However Dempo put those results behind them when they came up with a staggering 7–0 victory against United Sikkim at the Duler Stadium on 19 January 2013 in which Joaquim Abranches scored the opener for Dempo in the 5th minute before Clifford Miranda doubled the lead in the 35th minute and then Koko Sakibo, who ended up with a hat-trick, scored 56th, 59th, and 94th minutes of the match with Clifford Miranda and Joy Ferrao scoring within those goals in the 77th minute and 84th minute. Dempo then ended the month of January with a surprise draw against ONGC at the Duler Stadium in which a 91st-minute goal from Peter Carvalho canceled a 37th-minute goal from ONGC's Jatin Singh to earn Dempo a last grasp 1–1 draw.

The club then entered what would be a relatively short month compared to the other months of the season as they only played two matches in the I-League before the month long break till March. Dempo played their first match of the month on 2 February 2013 against Mumbai at the Duler Stadium in which the club had to score two goals in the final five minutes to draw the match 2–2 after both Evans Quao and David Opara scored for Mumbai in the 40th and 67th minute respectively and Peter Carvalho and Koko Sakibo scoring for Dempo in the 86th and 89th minutes respectively. Dempo then ended the month on a sad note when they fell 2–1 to Air India at the Balewadi Sports Complex on 10 February 2013; Prakash Thorat and Henry Ezeh scored for Air India while new loan signing Johnny Menyongar scored the conciliation for Dempo in the 83rd minute.

Dempo then began the post-break part of the I-League with yet another defeat at home to Sporting Goa by a score of 1–0 due to a 51st minute own goal from Rowilson Rodrigues. The club then succumbed to their third defeat in a row on 28 March 2013 against Pune after giving up goals to Sukhwinder Singh and James Moga. The losing streak then continued three days later when Dempo suffered their fourth defeat in a row against Mohun Bagan at the Kalyani Stadium in which Syed Nabi and Odafe Onyeka Okolie gave Bagan a 2–0 lead before Peter Carvalho scored the only goal for Dempo as the match ended 2–1 to Bagan.

The club however then entered the month of April with their fifth loss in a row after losing 2–0 to developmental side Pailan Arrows at the newly revamped Tilak Maidan Stadium in which goals from Holicharan Narzary and Alwyn George saw the Arrows run away with the victory.

The club then entered the final month of the season with two matches left. Their first match occurred on 4 May 2013 against East Bengal at the Tilak Maidan Stadium in which the club drew the match 2–2 with Joy Ferrao and Johnny Menyongar scoring for the club. The club then finished their season on 12 May 2013 against Salgaocar at home in which the club won 2–1 with goals coming from Ryuji Sueoka and Anthony Pereira.

6 October 2012 Round 1	Dempo	2 – 1	Churchill Brothers	Margao, Goa
17:30 IST	Sueoka 2', 75'	Report	Beto 47'	Stadium: Fatorda Stadium

12 October 2012 Round 2	Sporting Goa	0 – 5	Dempo	Margao, Goa
19:00 IST		Report	Pereira 15'; Sueoka 22'; Miranda 69', 74'; Sakibo 90+3' (pen.)	Stadium: Fatorda Stadium

28 October 2012 Round 3	United Sikkim	1 – 2	Dempo	Gangtok, Sikkim
14:30 IST	Nuruddin 59'	Report	Sakibo 20'; Sueoka 90+3' (pen.)	Stadium: Paljor Stadium

3 November 2012 Round 4	East Bengal	1 – 1	Dempo	Kolkata, West Bengal
14:00 IST	Edeh 31' (pen.)	Report	Carvalho 82'	Stadium: Salt Lake Stadium

10 November 2012 Round 5	Dempo	4 – 1	Shillong Lajong	Margao, Goa
16:00 IST	Sueoka 45+2', 90+1' (pen.); Miranda 50'; Pereira 90+8'	Report	Singh 73'	Stadium: Fatorda Stadium

16 November 2012 Round 6	ONGC	3 – 1	Dempo	Delhi
14:30 IST	Mollick 12'; Singh 57'; Brown 90+8'	Report	Antao 61'	Stadium: Ambedkar Stadium

24 November 2012 Round 7	Dempo	1 – 0	Air India	Margao, Goa
17:30 IST	Abranches 90'	Report		Stadium: Fatorda Stadium

28 November 2012 Round 8	Dempo	3 – 0	Mohun Bagan	Margao, Goa
19:00 IST	Abranches 40'; Sueoka 45' (pen.); Franco 70'	Report		Stadium: Fatorda Stadium

1 December 2012 Round 9	Salgaocar	1 – 2	Dempo	Margao, Goa
19:00 IST	Rooney 59'	Report	Ricketts 29'; Sueoka 84'	Stadium: Fatorda Stadium

8 December 2012 Round 10	Dempo	3 – 1	Prayag United	Margao, Goa
19:00 IST	Sueoka 36'; Carvalho 77'; Lawrence 78'	Report	Martins 21'	Stadium: Fatorda Stadium

15 December 2012 Round 11	Dempo	1 – 5	Pune	Margao, Goa
17:00 IST	Abranches 23'	Report	Moga 15', 53'; Izumi 76'; Lalpekhlua 79'; Douhou 85'	Stadium: Fatorda Stadium

22 December 2012 Round 12	Pailan Arrows	1 – 2	Dempo	Kolkata, West Bengal
14:00 IST	Singh 45' (pen.)	Report	Abranches 10', 59'	Stadium: Salt Lake Stadium

30 December 2012 Round 13	Mumbai	0 – 0	Dempo	Pune, Maharashtra
15:00 IST		Report		Stadium: Balewadi Sports Complex; Referee: D. Naik

4 January 2013 Round 14	Prayag United	1 – 0	Dempo	Kalyani, West Bengal
14:00 IST	Hernández 90'	Report		Stadium: Kalyani Stadium; Referee: P. Singh

13 January 2013 Round 15	Shillong Lajong	0 – 0	Dempo	Shillong, Meghalaya
15:00 IST		Report		Stadium: Nehru Stadium; Referee: P. Dhar

19 January 2013 Round 16	Dempo	7 – 0	United Sikkim	Mapusa, Goa
15:45 IST	Abranches 5'; Miranda 35', 77'; Sakibo 56', 59', 90+4'; Ferrao 84'	Report		Stadium: Duler Stadium; Referee: A. Meetei

27 January 2013 Round 17	Dempo	1 – 1	ONGC	Mapusa, Goa
15:45 IST	Carvalho 90+1'	Report	Singh 37'	Stadium: Duler Stadium; Referee: C.R. Srikrishna (Tamil Nadu)

2 February 2013 Round 18	Dempo	2 – 2	Mumbai	Mapusa, Goa
15:45 IST	Carvalho 86'; Sakibo 89'	Report	Quao 40'; Opara 67'	Stadium: Duler Stadium

10 February 2013 Round 19	Air India	2 – 1	Dempo	Pune, Maharashtra
19:00 IST	Thorat 51'; Ezeh 58'	Report	Menyongar 83'	Stadium: Balewadi Sports Complex

24 March 2013 Round 20	Dempo	0 – 1	Sporting Goa	Mapusa, Goa
16:00 IST		Report	Rodrigues (o.g.)	Stadium: Duler Stadium; Referee: Arun Pillai

28 March 2013 Round 21	Pune	2 – 0	Dempo	Pune, Maharashtra
18:30 IST	Singh 30'; Moga 44'	Report		Stadium: Balewadi Sports Complex; Referee: Rabichandra Singh

31 March 2013 Round 22	Mohun Bagan	2 – 1	Dempo	Kalyani, West Bengal
14:00 IST	Nabi 7'; Okolie 47'	Report	Carvalho 51'	Stadium: Kalyani Stadium; Referee: Srikrishna

6 April 2013 Round 23	Dempo	0 – 2	Pailan Arrows	Vasco da Gama, Goa
15:00 IST		Report	Narzary 2'; George 85'	Stadium: Tilak Maidan Stadium; Referee: Santosh Kumar

17 April 2013 Round 24	Churchill Brothers	2 – 2	Dempo	Vasco da Gama, Goa
15:00 IST	Chhetri 44', 53'	Summary	Carvalho (yellow card) 2'; Sueoka 12'; Pereira (yellow card) 29'; Climax Lawrence 45+1' (yellow card) 69'; Naik (yellow card) 68'	Stadium: Tilak Maidan Stadium; Referee: Pratap Singh

4 May 2013 Round 25	Dempo	2 – 2	East Bengal	Vasco da Gama, Goa
19:30 IST	Ferrao 48'; Menyongar 74'	Report	Orji 17'; Ahmed 83'	Stadium: Tilak Maidan Stadium; Referee: C.R. Srikrishna

12 May 2013 Round 26	Dempo	2 – 1	Salgaocar	Vasco da Gama, Goa
16:45 IST	Sueoka 20' (pen.); Pereira 90'	Report	Obatola	Stadium: Tilak Maidan Stadium; Referee: Shekar

=== Position by round ===
Round	1	2	3	4	5	6	7	8	9	10	11	12	13	14	15	16	17	18	19	20	21	22	23	24	25	26
Result	W	W	W	D	W	L	W	W	W	W	L	W	D	L	D	W	W	D	D	L	L	L	L	L	D	W
Position	6	1	1	1	1	3	2	2	1	1	2	1	1	4	4	3	3	3	3	3	3	4	5	5	5	5

Updated to match(es) played on 12 April 2013. Source: Dempo S.C.
W = Win; D = Draw; L = Loss
