= 2012–13 East Bengal FC season =

Indian football club season

East Bengal
2012–13 season
- President: Dr Pranab Dasgupta
- Head-Coach: Trevor Morgan
- Ground: Salt Lake Stadium; Kalyani Stadium; East Bengal Ground
- I-League: 3rd
- Calcutta Football League: Champions
- Federation Cup: Champions
- IFA Shield: Runners-up
- AFC Cup: Quarter-Finals (Continues into 2013–14)
- Top goalscorer: League: Chidi Edeh (18); All: Chidi Edeh (38)
Home colours	Away colours	Third colours

The 2012–13 season was East Bengal F.C.'s 93rd season since their formation in 1920 and their sixteenth season ever in the I-League which is India's top football league. At the end of the season the club had won the Federation Cup, finished 3rd in the 2012–13 I-League, and made it to the quarter-finals of the 2013 AFC Cup.

== Transfers ==
In:

Out:

Note: Flags indicate national team as has been defined under FIFA eligibility rules. Players may hold more than one non-FIFA nationality.

No.	Pos.	Nation	Player
—	DF	IND	Jaspal Parmar (from Salgaocar)
—	FW	IND	Ishfaq Ahmed (from Salgaocar)
—	FW	NGR	Chidi Edeh (from Salgaocar)
—	MF	IND	Lalrindika Ralte (from Churchill Brothers)
—	MF	IND	Jagpreet Singh (from Churchill Brothers)
—	GK	IND	Abhijit Mondal (from Prayag United)
—	DF	IND	Arnab Mondal (from Prayag United)
—	FW	IND	Manandeep Singh (from Air India)
—	FW	IND	Cavin Lobo (from Mumbai)
—	DF	IND	Safar Sardar (from Mohammedan)
—	GK	IND	Priyant Singh (from Tollygunge Agragami)
—	FW	AUS	Andrew Barisic (from (Indonesia) Arema)

No.	Pos.	Nation	Player
—	DF	IND	Nirmal Chettri (to Mohun Bagan)
—	FW	AUS	Tolgay Özbey (to Mohun Bagan)
—	MF	IND	Sushanth Mathew (to Mohun Bagan)
—	FW	IND	Beingaichho Beokhokhai (to United Sikkim)
—	FW	IND	Budhiram Tudu (to United Sikkim)
—	GK	IND	Debjit Mazumdar (to Bhawanipore)
—	FW	IND	Nabin Hela (to Bhawanipore)
—	GK	IND	Sandip Nandy (to Churchill Brothers)
—	GK	IND	Abhra Mondal (to Pune)
—	DF	IND	Ravinder Singh (to Prayag United)
—	FW	IND	Biswarup Deb (to Techno Aryan)
—	DF	IND	Sunil Kumar (to Dodsal)
—	MF	IND	Khemtang Paite (on loan to Pune)
—	DF	IND	Safar Sardar (on loan to United Sikkim)
—	DF	IND	Abhishek Das (on loan to United Sikkim)
—	DF	IND	Jaspal Parmar (released)
—	FW	BRA	Edmilson (released)
—	FW	IND	Branco Cardozo (to Air India)
—	FW	IND	Seminlen Doungel (on loan to Pailan Arrows)

== Squad ==
=== First-team squad ===
As of 19 January 2013.

Note: Flags indicate national team as defined under FIFA eligibility rules; some limited exceptions apply. Players may hold more than one non-FIFA nationality.

No.	Pos.	Nation	Player
1	GK	IND	Abhijit Mondal
2	DF	IND	Raju Gaikwad
3	DF	IND	Arnab Mondal
4	DF	NGR	Uga Okpara
5	DF	IND	Sunil Thakur
6	FW	IND	Baljit Sahni
7	MF	IND	Harmanjot Khabra
8	DF	IND	Naoba Singh
9	MF	IND	Alvito D'Cunha
10	FW	NGR	Chidi Edeh
12	MF	IND	Reisangmei Vashum
14	MF	IND	Mehtab Hossain
15	MF	IND	Sanju Pradhan (captain)
16	DF	IND	Gurwinder Singh
18	MF	NGR	Penn Orji

No.	Pos.	Nation	Player
19	MF	IND	Charan Rai
21	MF	IND	Lalrindika Ralte
23	FW	IND	Robin Singh
24	FW	IND	Cavin Lobo
25	DF	IND	Robert Lalthalma
26	FW	IND	Manandeep Singh
28	MF	IND	Jagpreet Singh
27	FW	AUS	Andrew Barisic
29	DF	IND	Saumik Dey
30	GK	IND	Gurpreet Singh Sandhu
31	GK	IND	Jayanta Paul
32	GK	IND	Priyant Kumar
33	DF	IND	Saikat Saha Roy
34	MF	IND	Subodh Kumar
35	MF	IND	Ishfaq Ahmed

=== Out on loan ===
Note: Flags indicate national team as defined under FIFA eligibility rules; some limited exceptions apply. Players may hold more than one non-FIFA nationality.

No.	Pos.	Nation	Player
22	DF	IND	Abhishek Das (at United Sikkim until the end of the 2012–13 season)
33	FW	IND	Safar Sardar (at United Sikkim until the end of the 2012–13 season)

No.	Pos.	Nation	Player
—	MF	IND	Khemtang Paite (at Pune until the end of the 2012–13 season)
—	FW	IND	Seminlen Doungel (at Pailan Arrows until the end of the 2012–13 season)

== Kit ==
Sponsors: Kingfisher Premium / Co-Sponsor: Rose-Valley

Home	Away	Third

== Competitions ==
=== Overall ===
Competition	First match	Last match	Final position
Calcutta Football League	17 August 2012	23 May 2013	Champions
Federation Cup	21 September 2012	30 September 2012	Champions
I-League	7 October 2012	12 May 2013	3rd
IFA Shield	3 March 2013	20 March 2013	Runners-up
AFC Cup	27 February 2013	15 May 2013	Quarter-Finals (Note: Continued to the 2013-14 season.)

=== Overview ===
Competition	Record							
Competition	Pld	W	D	L	GF	GA	GD	Win %
Calcutta Football League (Note: Includes two wins from Walkover given by Prayag United.)	17	15	1	1	57	7	+50	88.24
Federation Cup	5	4	1	0	11	7	+4	80.00
I-League	26	13	8	5	44	18	+26	50.00
IFA Shield	5	3	1	1	6	3	+3	60.00
AFC Cup	7	5	2	0	18	7	+11	71.43
Total	60	40	13	7	136	42	+94	66.67

Last updated: 31 May 2013
Source: Competitions

=== Calcutta Football League ===
==== Table ====
Group A

2012–13 Calcutta Premier Division

Championship Stage

2012–13 Calcutta Premier Division

==== Fixtures & results ====
Win Draw Loss

===== First stage =====
17 August 2012 1	East Bengal	5 – 0	Eastern Railway	Salt Lake Stadium, Kolkata
	Sahni 6', 33', 71'; Lobo 24'; Edeh 38'

25 August 2012 2	East Bengal	4 – 0	Kalighat MS	Salt Lake Stadium, Kolkata
	Orji 13'; Sahni 24', 59'; Edeh 84'

11 September 2012 3	East Bengal	4 – 0	Army XI	Salt Lake Stadium, Kolkata
	Sahni 43', 47', 52'; Manandeep 54'

31 October 2012 4	East Bengal	3 – 0	BNR	Salt Lake Stadium, Kolkata
	Ralte 10'; Singh 62'; Lobo 70'

6 November 2012 5	East Bengal	0 – 0	George Telegraph	Salt Lake Stadium, Kolkata
		Report

21 November 2012 6	East Bengal	1 – 0	Peerless	Salt Lake Stadium, Kolkata
	Singh 45+2'

13 December 2012 7	East Bengal	1 – 2	Aryan	East Bengal Ground, Kolkata
	Gaikwad 65'		Gopal Debnath 12'; Pankaj Moula 75'

19 December 2012 8	East Bengal	4 – 0	Railway FC	East Bengal Ground, Kolkata
	Pradhan 33' (pen.); Doungel 44'; Manandeep 66'; Vashum 78'

15 January 2013 9	East Bengal	3 – 0	Prayag United	Salt Lake Stadium, Kolkata
		Report
Note: Walkover given by Prayag United.

===== Championship Stage =====
29 January 2013 1	East Bengal	1 – 0	Bhawanipore	Kalyani Stadium, Kalyani
Tuesday	Kumar 52'

5 February 2013 2	East Bengal	4 – 1	Eastern Railway	Kalyani Stadium, Kalyani
Tuesday	Singh 7'; Barisic 29'; Avik 73' (own goal); Khabra 85'		Bera 73'

13 February 2013 3	East Bengal	4 – 0	Kalighat MS	Salt Lake Stadium, Kolkata
Wednesday	Barisic 7'; Pradhan 72'; Orji 76', 90'

16 February 2013 4	East Bengal	4 – 0	Southern Samity	Kalyani Stadium, Kalyani
Saturday	Sahni 52', 58'; Edeh 84'; Khabra 89'

19 February 2013 5	East Bengal	7 – 1	Techno Aryan	Kalyani Stadium, Kalyani
Tuesday	Barisic 7', 36', 67'; Ralte 20', 50'; Sahni 60'; Orji 90+2'		Mallick 43'

23 February 2013 6	East Bengal	6 – 1	Mohammedan	Salt Lake Stadium, Kolkata
Saturday	Sahni 10', 25', 53'; Edeh 12'; Singh 68', 75'		Hyo-Jun 60'

21 May 2013 7	East Bengal	3 – 0	Prayag United	Kalyani Stadium, Kalyani
Tuesday		Report
Note: Walkover given by Prayag United.

23 May 2013 8^{(KD)}	East Bengal	3 – 2	Mohun Bagan	Salt Lake Stadium, Kolkata
Thursday	Edeh 22', 72'; Orji 28'	Report	Okolie 38'; Ozbey 90+2'	Attendance: 85,000; Referee: Santosh Kumar

=== Federation Cup ===
Group C

Team	Pld	W	D	L	GF	GA	GD	Pts
East Bengal	3	2	1	0	6	4	+2	7
ONGC	3	2	0	1	8	4	+4	6
Sporting Goa	3	1	1	1	5	5	0	4
Kalighat MS	3	0	0	3	6	12	−6	0

==== Summary ====
East Bengal entered the 2012 Indian Federation Cup automatically as they were already in the I-League. They were placed in Group C along with Sporting Clube de Goa, ONGC, and Kalighat MS and their matches were played in Siliguri. East Bengal experienced mixed fortunes at the start of the tournament as they drew their opening match 1–1 against Sporting Goa with new Nigerian signing Chidi Edeh scoring his first goal for the club in the 10th minute from the penalty spot. The club then won their first game of the season in their second match of the tournament on 23 September 2012 against ONGC F.C. in which East Bengal came back from 0–1 down to 2–1 winners after Edeh and other new signing, India international, Manandeep Singh scored two goals to gift Bengal the victory. East Bengal then confirmed promotion out of the group stage of the Federation Cup to the Semi-Finals after a remarkable come from behind victory in their last game at the group stage to Kalighat MS in which East Bengal came back from 2–0 to tie the score up at 2–2 through two goals from Manandeep Singh in the 26th and 30th minute but then East Bengal had to come from behind again after Kalighat took the lead again to go up 3–2 with Edeh scoring two goals to win the game for East Bengal 4–3 and send them to the semi-finals. In the semi-finals East Bengal took on Churchill Brothers and after finishing regulation time tied at 0–0 the match went into 30-minute extra-time where East Bengal would eventually take the lead from former Churchill Brothers youngster Lalrindika Ralte in the 111th minute of play which then allowed East Bengal to win the match 1–0 and send them to the final. Then in the final East Bengal found themselves down 1–0 after 51 minutes after their opponents, Dempo, scored through former India captain Climax Lawrence but East Bengal managed to equalize through newly signed defender Arnab Mondal in the 60th minute which would then send both clubs to 30-minute extra-time at 1–1 and that is where East Bengal start to show good form by scoring twice through Manandeep Singh in the 100th minute and Chidi Edeh in the 109th minute to give East Bengal a 3–1 lead which would then be cut down to a 3–2 after another former India international, Mahesh Gawli scored in the 111th minute but that was still enough for East Bengal to win the Federation Cup for the 2nd time in 3 years and their eighth overall.

==== Fixtures & results ====
Win Draw Loss

21 September 2012 Group Stage	Sporting Goa	1 – 1	East Bengal	Siliguri, West Bengal
19:00 IST	Fernandes 82'	Report	Edeh 10' (pen.)	Stadium: Kanchenjunga Stadium

23 September 2012 Group Stage	East Bengal	2 – 1	ONGC	Siliguri, West Bengal
19:00 IST	Edeh 45+2'; Singh 80'	Report	Yusa 11'	Stadium: Kanchenjunga Stadium

25 September 2012 Group Stage	East Bengal	4 – 3	Kalighat	Siliguri, West Bengal
15:00 IST	Singh 26', 30'; Edeh 45' (pen.), 60' (pen.)	Report	Gbilee 11'; Kundu 16'; Chizoba 40'	Stadium: Kanchenjunga Stadium

27 September 2012 Semi-Finals	Churchill Brothers	0 – 1 (a.e.t.)	East Bengal	Siliguri, West Bengal
19:00 IST		Report	Ralte 111'	Stadium: Kanchenjunga Stadium

30 September 2012 Final	East Bengal	3 – 2 (a.e.t.)	Dempo	Siliguri, West Bengal
19:00 IST	Mondal 60'; Singh 100'; Edeh 109'	Report	Lawrence 51'; Gawli 111'	Stadium: Kanchenjunga Stadium

=== I-League ===
==== Table ====
Pos	Team	Pld	W	D	L	GF	GA	GD	Pts	Qualification or relegation
1	Churchill Brothers (C)	26	16	7	3	56	22	+34	55	Qualification for 2014 AFC Cup group stage
2	Pune	26	16	4	6	53	26	+27	52	Qualification for 2014 AFC Champions League qualifying play-off (Note: Pune were chosen to represent India in the AFC Champions League as they passed the club licensing requirements.)
3	East Bengal	26	13	8	5	44	18	+26	47	
4	Prayag United	26	13	5	8	55	35	+20	44	
5	Dempo	26	11	7	8	45	33	+12	40	

Source: IndiaFooty.com
Rules for classification: 1) points; 2) goal difference; 3) number of goals scored.
(C) Champions

==== Fixtures & results ====
Win Draw Loss

7 October 2012 Round 1	Sporting Goa	0 – 0	East Bengal	Margao, Goa
17:30 IST		Report		Stadium: Fatorda Stadium

11 October 2012 Round 2	United Sikkim	0 – 1	East Bengal	Gangtok, Sikkim
14:30 IST		Report	Ralte 82'	Stadium: Paljor Stadium

29 October 2012 Round 3	East Bengal	1 – 0	Pune	Kolkata, West Bengal
14:30 IST	Edeh 28'	Report		Stadium: Salt Lake Stadium

3 November 2012 Round 4	East Bengal	1 – 1	Dempo	Kolkata, West Bengal
14:00 IST	Edeh 31' (pen.)	Report	Carvalho 82'	Stadium: Salt Lake Stadium

10 November 2012 Round 5	Air India	0 – 3	East Bengal	Pune, Maharashtra
15:00 IST		Report	Khabra 37', 64'; Orji 75'	Stadium: Balewadi Sports Complex

17 November 2012 Round 6	Churchill Brothers	0 – 3	East Bengal	Margao, Goa
17:30 IST		Report	Edeh 5', 90+4'; Singh 77'	Stadium: Fatorda Stadium

24 November 2012 Round 7	East Bengal	5 – 0	ONGC	Kolkata, West Bengal
14:00 IST	Edeh 26'; Penn 51'; M. Singh 66'; Ralte 78'; R. Singh 83'	Report		Stadium: Salt Lake Stadium

27 November 2012 Round 8	East Bengal	1 – 0	Salgaocar	Kolkata, West Bengal
14:00 IST	Edeh 66'	Report		Stadium: Salt Lake Stadium

1 December 2012 Round 9	Shillong Lajong	0 – 0	East Bengal	Shillong, Meghalaya
14:00 IST		Report		Stadium: Nehru Stadium

9 December 2012 Round 10^{(KD)}	East Bengal	3 – 0	Mohun Bagan	Kolkata, West Bengal
14:00 IST	Khabra 43'			Stadium: Salt Lake Stadium
Note: Match was abandoned due to crowd violence at half-time. Due to Mohun Bagan not playing the rest of the game East Bengal were awarded a 3–0 victory.

16 December 2012 Round 11	East Bengal	0 – 1	Prayag United	Kolkata, West Bengal
14:00 IST		Report	Martins 75'	Stadium: Salt Lake Stadium; Referee: Santosh Kumar

23 December 2012 Round 12	Mumbai	2 – 1	East Bengal	Pune, Maharashtra
19:00 IST	Fernandes 64'; Yakubu 90+4'	Report	Edeh 90+7'	Stadium: Balewadi Sports Complex; Referee: A. Costa

30 December 2012 Round 13	East Bengal	3 – 0	Pailan Arrows	Kalyani, West Bengal
14:00 IST	Singh 44'; Pradhan 55', 86'	Report		Stadium: Kalyani Stadium; Referee: R. Dsa

5 January 2013 Round 14	Salgaocar	1 – 4	East Bengal	Mapusa, Goa
15:45 IST	Masceranhas 8'	Report	Edeh 36', 65', 81'; Singh 59'	Stadium: Duler Stadium; Referee: A. Rowan

8 January 2013 Round 15	ONGC	1 – 0	East Bengal	New Delhi
14:00 IST	Yusa 87'	Report		Stadium: Ambedkar Stadium; Referee: A. Rowan

13 January 2013 Round 16	East Bengal	2 – 0	Mumbai	Kalyani, West Bengal
14:00 IST	Chidi 11'; Ralte 53'	Report		Stadium: Kalyani Stadium; Referee: Santosh Kumar

19 January 2013 Round 17	East Bengal	0 – 3	Churchill Brothers	Kolkata, West Bengal
14:00 IST		Report	Antchouet 34', 45+2'; Moghrabi 82'	Stadium: Salt Lake Stadium

25 January 2013 Round 18	Pune	1 – 2	East Bengal	Pune, Maharashtra
19:00 IST	Izumi 17'	Report	Edeh 6', 75' (pen.)	Stadium: Balewadi Sports Complex; Referee: C.R. Srikrishna (Tamil Nadu)

2 February 2013 Round 19	Pailan Arrows	1 – 2	East Bengal	Kalyani, West Bengal
15:00 IST	George 2'	Report	Chidi 7' (pen.) , Ralte 32'	Stadium: Kalyani Stadium; Referee: Laiq Khan

9 February 2013 Round 20^{(KD)}	Mohun Bagan	0 – 0	East Bengal	Kalyani, West Bengal
14:00 IST		Report		Stadium: Salt Lake Stadium; Referee: Santosh Kumar

23 March 2013 Round 21	East Bengal	1 – 1	Air India	Kalyani, West Bengal
14:00 IST	Chidi 60'	Report	Ezeh 90+2'	Stadium: Kalyani Stadium; Referee: Ajit Meetei

29 March 2013 Round 22	Prayag United S.C.	2 – 2	East Bengal	Kalyani, West Bengal
14:00 IST	Hernandez 62' , Martins 66'	Report	Chidi 41' , Manandeep 49'	Stadium: Kalyani Stadium; Referee: Kunal Singh

14 April 2013 Round 23	East Bengal	1 – 1	Sporting Goa	Kolkata, West Bengal
15:30 IST	Edeh 63'	Report	Juanfri 44'	Stadium: Salt Lake Stadium; Referee: C.R. Srikrishna

4 May 2013 Round 24	Dempo	2 – 2	East Bengal	Vasco da Gama, Goa
16:15 IST	Ferrao 48'; Menyongar 74'	Report	Orji 17'; Ahmed 83'	Stadium: Tilak Maidan Stadium; Referee: C.R. Srikrishna

8 May 2013 Round 25	East Bengal	6 – 0	United Sikkim	Kolkata, West Bengal
15:30 IST	Orji 8'; Hossain 21'; Ralte 35'; Lobo 80'; Barisic 88' (pen.); Edeh 89'	Report		Stadium: Salt Lake Stadium; Referee: Santosh Kumar

12 May 2013 Round 26	East Bengal	0 – 1	Shillong Lajong	Kolkata, West Bengal
15:30 IST		Report	Matsugae 8'	Stadium: Salt Lake Stadium; Referee: Umesh Bora

=== IFA Shield ===
Group A

Team	Pld	W	D	L	GF	GA	GD	Pts
East Bengal	3	3	0	0	5	1	+4	9
Prayag United	3	2	0	1	7	3	+4	6
ONGC	3	1	0	2	4	5	−1	3
Pailan Arrows	3	0	0	3	1	8	−7	0

==== Fixtures & results ====
Win Draw Loss

3 March 2013 Group stage	East Bengal	1 – 0	Pailan Arrows	Kanchenjunga Stadium, Siliguri
	Edeh 35'

6 March 2013 Group stage	East Bengal	2 – 1	ONGC	Kanchenjunga Stadium, Siliguri
	Barisic 20'; Singh 90+3' (pen.)		Lalmuanpuia 42'

8 March 2013 Group stage	Prayag United	0 – 2	East Bengal	Kanchenjunga Stadium, Siliguri
			Edeh 51', 75'

17 March 2013 Semi Final	East Bengal	1 – 1 (a.e.t.) (4 – 2 p)	Mohun Bagan	Salt Lake Stadium, Kolkata
	Barisic 88'	Report	Sabeeth 46'	Attendance: 70,000 (estimated)
	Penalties
	Edeh (penalty scored); Barisic (penalty scored); Pradhan (penalty scored); Singh (penalty missed); Sahni (penalty scored)		(penalty missed) Okolie; (penalty missed) Chettri; (penalty scored) Raja; (penalty scored) Khongjee

20 March 2013 Final	Prayag United	1 – 0	East Bengal	Salt Lake Stadium, Kolkata
	Martins 79'

=== AFC Cup ===
Due to East Bengal's 2012 Indian Federation Cup victory the club automatically qualified for the 2013 AFC Cup which is the 2nd tier Asian competition ran by the Asian Football Confederation. On 6 December 2012 the AFC made their official 2013 AFC Cup group-stage draw and East Bengal was placed in Group H along with reigning 2012 S.League champions Tampines Rovers of Singapore, Malaysia Super League third place team Selangor FA, and V-League third place team Saigon Xuan Thanh.

==== Table ====
Group H

Team	Pld	W	D	L	GF	GA	GD	Pts	KEB	SEL	SG	TPR
(India) East Bengal	6	4	2	0	13	6	+7	14		1–0	4–1	2–1
(Malaysia) Selangor	6	2	2	2	12	11	+1	8	2–2		3–1	3–3
(Vietnam) Sài Gòn Xuân Thành	6	2	2	2	9	12	−3	8	0–0	2–1		2–2
(Singapore) Tampines Rovers	6	0	2	4	12	17	−5	2	2–4	2–3	2–3	

Source: RSSSF
Legend: Blue = home team win; Yellow = draw; Red = away team win.

==== Fixtures & results ====
Win Draw Loss

27 February 2013 Group Stage	East Bengal (India)	1 – 0	(Malaysia) Selangor FA	Kolkata, West Bengal
	Ralte 42'	Report		Stadium: Salt Lake Stadium; Attendance: 3,000; Referee: Tayeb Shamsuzzaman (Bangladesh)

13 March 2013 Group Stage	Saigon Xuan Thanh (Vietnam)	0 – 0	(India) East Bengal	Ho Chi Minh City, Vietnam
		Report		Stadium: Thong Nhat Stadium; Attendance: 5,000; Referee: Ko Hyung-Jin (Korea Republic)

3 April 2013 Group Stage	Tampines Rovers (Singapore)	2 – 4	(India) East Bengal	Kallang, Singapore
	Hadžibulić 28'; Amri 65'	Report	Hadee 19' (o.g.); Barisic 62', 87'; Edeh 64'	Stadium: Jalan Besar Stadium; Attendance: 1,082; Referee: Chaiya Mahapab (Thailand)

9 April 2013 Group Stage	East Bengal (India)	2 – 1	(Singapore) Tampines Rovers	Kolkata, West Bengal
	Edeh 23'; Ralte 87'	Report	Esah 69'	Stadium: Salt Lake Stadium; Attendance: 7,000; Referee: Nivon Robesh Gamini (Sri Lanka)

23 April 2013 Group Stage	Selangor FA (Malaysia)	2 – 2	(India) East Bengal	Shah Alam Stadium, Shah Alam
	Shukur 79'; Adib 90+3'	Report	Orji 23'; Ralte 54'	Attendance: 1,000; Referee: Ng Kai Lam (Hong Kong)

30 April 2013 Group Stage	East Bengal (India)	4 – 1	(Vietnam) Saigon Xuan Thanh	Kolkata, West Bengal
	Edeh 8' (pen.); Barisic 45'; Orji 53', 59'	Report	Amougou 61'	Stadium: Salt Lake Stadium; Attendance: 2,500; Referee: Fahad Al-Mirdasi (Saudi Arabia)

15 May 2013 Round of 16	East Bengal (India)	5 – 1	(Myanmar) Yangon United	Kolkata, India
18:00 UTC+5:30	Orji 2'; Edeh 25', 72', 77'; Hossain 48'	Report	César 79'	Stadium: Salt Lake Stadium; Attendance: 8,000; Referee: Minoru Tōjō (Japan)

== Statistics ==
=== Appearances ===
Players with no appearances are not included in the list.

Appearances for East Bengal in 2012–13 season
No.	Pos.	Nat.	Name	CFL (Note: Does not include two Walkover matches against Prayag United.)		I League		Fed Cup		IFA Shield		AFC Cup		Total	
No.	Pos.	Nat.	Name	Apps	Starts	Apps	Starts	Apps	Starts	Apps	Starts	Apps	Starts	Apps	Starts
Goalkeepers
1	GK	(India)	Abhijit Mondal	3	3	14	14	4	4	1	1	3	3	25	25
30	GK	(India)	Gurpreet Singh Sandhu	10	10	14	12	1	1	4	4	4	4	33	31
31	GK	(India)	Jayanta Pal	2	2	0	0	0	0	0	0	0	0	2	2
Defenders
3	DF	(India)	Arnab Mondal	4	4	21	21	2	2	0	0	2	1	29	28
4	DF	(Nigeria)	Uga Okpara	8	8	21	20	4	3	5	5	6	6	44	42
8	DF	(India)	Naoba Singh	7	6	21	20	5	5	4	2	4	2	41	35
29	DF	(India)	Soumik Dey	8	7	20	19	5	5	3	3	6	6	42	40
2	DF	(India)	Raju Gaikwad	6	6	9	8	2	2	0	0	3	3	20	19
19	DF	(India)	Robert Lalthlamuana	7	7	9	7	1	0	2	2	2	1	21	17
16	DF	(India)	Gurwinder Singh	8	7	8	6	4	3	5	5	5	4	30	25
33	DF	(India)	Saikat Saha Roy	7	7									7	7
5	DF	(India)	Sunil Kumar	5	4									5	4
36	DF	(India)	Safar Sardar	1	1									1	1
25	DF	(India)	Abhishek Das	2	0							0	0	2	0
Midfielders
18	MF	(Nigeria)	Penn Orji	9	9	26	24	5	5	5	4	7	7	52	49
14	MF	(India)	Mehtab Hossain	2	2	23	22	4	4	2	2	6	6	37	36
35	MF	(India)	Ishfaq Ahmed	6	6	22	18	5	5	2	1	3	2	38	32
21	MF	(India)	Lalrindika Ralte	11	9	21	12	4	0	4	4	7	7	47	32
7	MF	(India)	Harmanjot Khabra	5	5	16	15	4	3	5	4	5	5	35	32
15	MF	(India)	Sanju Pradhan	9	5	14	6	4	2	5	4	6	5	38	22
24	MF	(India)	Cavin Lobo	14	10	9	4	0	0	1	1	2	1	26	16
12	MF	(India)	Reisangmei Vashum	11	8	4	1	0	0	0	0	1	0	16	9
34	MF	(India)	Subodh Kumar	6	6	4	4	2	1	3	3	0	0	15	14
9	MF	(India)	Alvito D'Cunha	8	0	3	0					0	0	11	0
17	MF	(India)	Sushanth Matthews	4	2									4	2
Forwards
10	FW	(Nigeria)	Chidi Edeh	6	5	26	25	5	5	5	4	7	6	49	45
26	FW	(India)	Manandeep Singh	6	3	20	14	5	3	3	0	3	1	37	21
23	FW	(India)	Robin Singh	8	7	13	6	0	0	2	1	2	0	25	14
27	FW	(Australia)	Andrew Barisic	6	4	7	3			5	2	7	7	25	16
6	FW	(India)	Baljit Singh Sahni	12	9	6	5	3	2	4	3	4	0	29	19
38	FW	(India)	Semilen Doungel	5	3	0	0							5	3
27	FW	(India)	Branco Vincent Cardozo	1	0									1	0

=== Goal scorers ===
Goals for East Bengal in 2012–13 season
Rank	No.	Pos.	Nat.	Name	CFL	I League	Fed Cup	IFA Shield	AFC Cup	Total
1	10	FW	(Nigeria)	Chidi Edeh	6	18	5	3	6	38
2	6	FW	(India)	Baljit Singh Sahni	14	0	0	0	0	14
3	18	MF	(Nigeria)	Penn Orji	5	4	0	0	4	13
4	21	MF	(India)	Lalrindika Ralte	3	5	1	0	3	12
5	27	FW	(Australia)	Andrew Barisic	5	1		2	3	11
6	26	FW	(India)	Manandeep Singh	2	3	4	1	0	10
7	23	FW	(India)	Robin Singh	5	3		0	0	8
8	7	MF	(India)	Harmanjot Khabra	2	3	0	0	0	5
9	15	MF	(India)	Sanju Pradhan	2	2	0	0	0	4
10	24	MF	(India)	Cavin Lobo	2	1	0	0	0	3
11	14	MF	(India)	Mehtab Hossain	0	1	0	0	1	2
12	2	DF	(India)	Raju Gaikwad	1	0	0	0	0	1
12	3	DF	(India)	Arnab Mondal	0	0	1	0	0	1
12	12	MF	(India)	Reisangmei Vashum	1	0	0	0	0	1
12	34	MF	(India)	Subodh Kumar	1	0	0	0	0	1
12	35	MF	(India)	Ishfaq Ahmed	0	1	0	0	0	1
12	38	FW	(India)	Semilen Doungel	1	0		0		1
Own goals					1	0	0	0	1	2
Total					51	42	11	6	18	128
