= 2012 Indian Federation Cup final =

- Event: 2012 Indian Federation Cup
East Bengal	Dempo
3	2
- After Extra Time
- Date: 30 September 2012
- Venue: Kanchenjunga Stadium, Siliguri, West Bengal
- Referee: Vishnu Chawhan (Gujarat)
- Attendance: 35,000

The 2012 Indian Federation Cup final was the 34th final of the Indian Federation Cup, the top knock-out competition in India, and was contested between East Bengal and Dempo on 30 September 2012.

East Bengal won the final 3–2, to claim their eighth Federation Cup title. Climax Lawrence put Dempo in front in the 51st minute but Arnab Mondal equalized for East Bengal in the 60th minute. The match then went into extra-time as Manandeep Singh scored the winner for East Bengal in the 100th minute before Chidi Edeh scored the third goal for East Bengal in the 109th minute to seal the victory and championship before Mahesh Gawli scored the consolation for Dempo.

== Route to the final ==
=== East Bengal ===
Round	Opposition	Score
GS	Sporting Goa	1–1
GS	ONGC	2–1
GS	Kalighat MS	4–3
SF	Churchill Brothers	1–0

East Bengal entered the 2012 Indian Federation Cup automatically as they were already in the I-League. They were placed in Group C along with Sporting Clube de Goa, ONGC, and Kalighat MS and their matches were played in Siliguri. The tournament got off to a mixture start for East Bengal as they drew their opening match 1–1 against Sporting Goa with new Nigerian signing Chidi Edeh scoring his first goal for the club in the 10th minute from the penalty spot. The club then won their first game of the season in their second match of the tournament on 23 September 2012 against ONGC F.C. in which East Bengal came back from 0–1 down to 2–1 winners after Edeh and other new signing, India international, Manandeep Singh scored two goals to gift Bengal the victory. East Bengal then confirmed promotion out of the group stage of the Federation Cup to the Semi-Finals after a remarkable come from behind victory in their last game at the group stage to Kalighat MS in which East Bengal came back from 2–0 to tie the score up at 2–2 through two goals from Manandeep Singh in the 26th and 30th minute but then East Bengal had to come from behind again after Kalighat took the lead again to go up 3–2 with Edeh scoring two goals to win the game for East Bengal 4–3 and send them to the semi-finals.

In the semi-finals East Bengal took on Churchill Brothers and after finishing regulation time tied at 0–0 the match went into 30-minute extra-time where East Bengal would eventually take the lead from former Churchill Brothers youngster Lalrindika Ralte in the 111th minute of play which then allowed East Bengal to win the match 1–0 and send them to the final.

=== Dempo ===
Round	Opposition	Score
GS	Pailan Arrows	1–1
GS	Shillong Lajong	1–0
GS	Mumbai	4–0
SF	Salgaocar	2–0

Dempo entered the 2012 Indian Federation Cup automatically as they were already in the I-League. They were placed in Group A along with Mumbai, Pailan Arrows, and Shillong Lajong and their matches were played in Jamshedpur. The tournament got off to a mix start as well for Dempo as they drew against Pailan Arrows 1–1 in their first match with Clifford Miranda scoring the equalizer for Dempo after Holicharan Narzary gave Pailan the lead. Dempo then won their first match of the tournament in their second match of the group stage against Shillong Lajong with Clifford Miranda again being the goalscorer for Dempo as they won 1–0. Dempo then confirmed their place into the semi-finals of the Federation Cup with a demolition performance over Mumbai in their last group match in which they won 4–0 with Miranda scoring one goal for the club and Nigerian Koko Sakibo scoring a hat-trick.

In the semi-finals Dempo took on reigning Federation Cup champions from 2011 Salgaocar on 27 September 2012 in a match that was eventually won by Dempo 2–0 with goals coming from Joaquim Abranches in the 70th minute and Koko Sakibo in the 84th minute to send the Goan club to the final.

== Match ==
=== Details ===
30 September 2012
18:30 IST

East Bengal	3 – 2 (a.e.t.)	Dempo
Mondal 60'; Singh 100'; Edeh 109'	Report	Lawrence 51'; Gawli 111'

Kanchenjunga Stadium, Siliguri
Attendance: 35,000 (est.)
Referee: Vishnu Chawhan (Gujarat)

East Bengal	Dempo

GK	1	(India) Abhijit Mondal
RB	29	(India) Saumik Dey
CB	3	(India) Arnab Mondal
CB	2	(India) Raju Gaikwad
LB	8	(India) Naoba Singh
RM	7	(India) Harmanjot Khabra	(substituted off) 91'
CM	14	(India) Mehtab Hossain (c)
CM	18	(Nigeria) Penn Orji
LM	35	(India) Ishfaq Ahmed	(substituted off) 79'
ST	26	(India) Manandeep Singh
ST	10	(Nigeria) Chidi Edeh	(substituted off) 114'
Substitutes:
GK	30	(India) Gurpreet Singh Sandhu
DF	25	(India) Robert Lalthalma	(substituted in) 114'
DF	34	(India) Subodh Kumar
MF	15	(India) Sanju Pradhan	(substituted in) 79'
MF	21	(India) Lalrindika Ralte	(substituted in) 91'
FW	6	(India) Baljit Sahni
FW	38	(India) Seminlen Doungel
Manager:
(England) Trevor Morgan

GK	1	(India) Subhasish Roy Chowdhury
RB	4	(India) Creson Antao
CB	2	(India) Debabrata Roy
CB	28	(India) Mahesh Gawli
LB	18	(India) Valeriano Rebello
MF	6	(India) Peter Carvalho	(yellow card) 39'
MF	15	(India) Clifford Miranda (c)		(substituted off) 79'
MF	8	(India) Climax Lawrence		(substituted off) 103'
MF	14	(India) Anthony Pereira	(yellow card) 78'	(substituted off) 96'
ST	17	(India) Joaquim Abranches
ST	11	(Nigeria) Koko Sakibo
Substitutes:
GK	31	(India) Tyson Caiado
DF	16	(India) Samir Subash Naik
DF	25	(India) Rowilson Rodrigues
MF	20	(Japan) Ryuji Sueoka		(substituted in) 79'
MF	7	(India) Godwin Franco		(substituted in) 103'
MF	19	(India) Romeo Fernandes		(substituted in) 96'
FW	29	(India) Cliffton Gonsalves
Manager:
(India) Armando Colaco
