= 2012 Indian Federation Cup =

34th edition of the Federation Cup

2012 Federation Cup
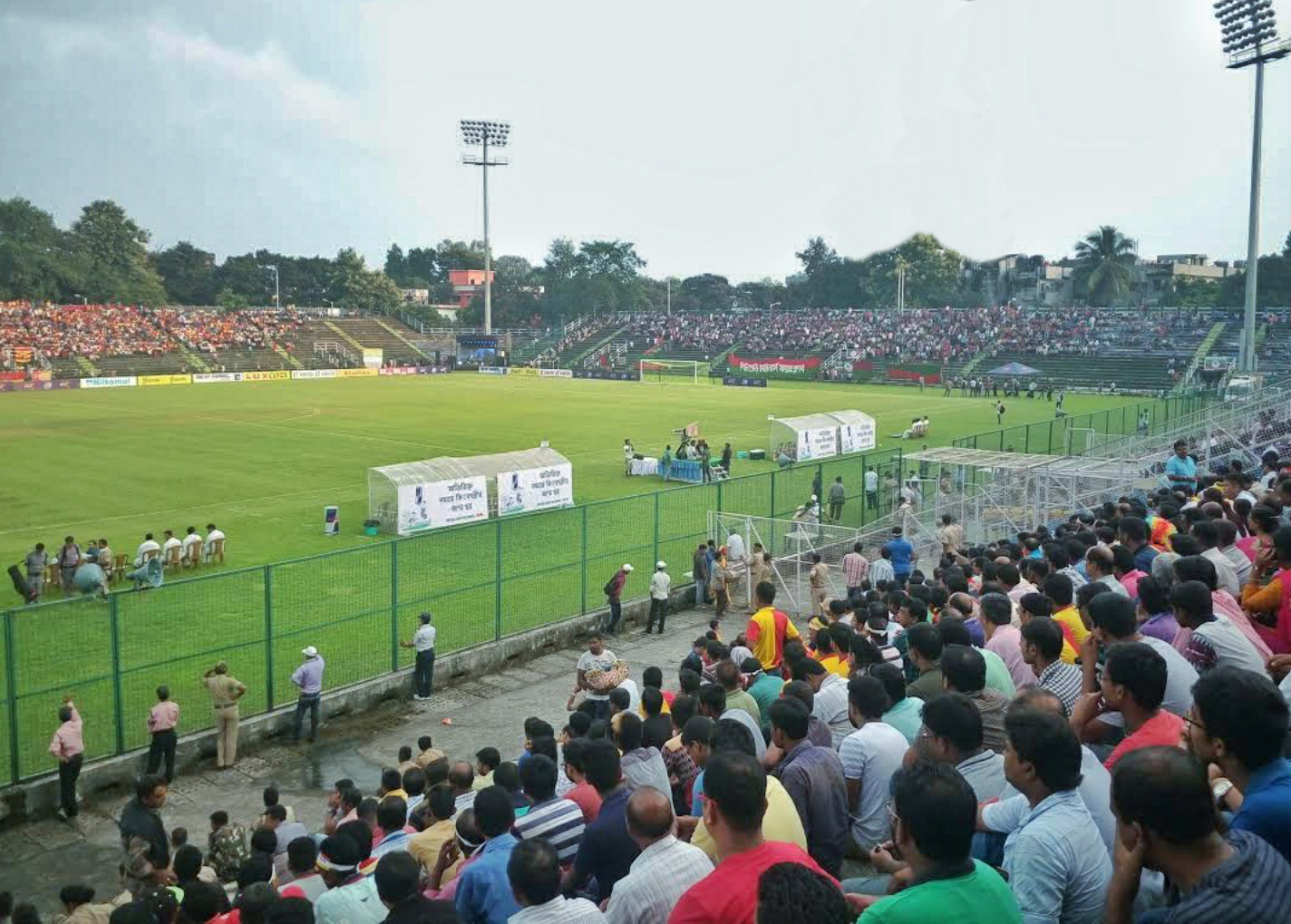
- Kanchenjunga Stadium hosted the final on 30 September 2012

Tournament details
- Country: India
- Teams: 20

Final positions
- Champions: East Bengal (8th title)
- Runners-up: Dempo
- AFC Cup: East Bengal

Tournament statistics
- Matches played: 33
- Goals scored: 102 (3.09 per match)
- Top goal scorer: Chidi Edeh (5)

The 2012 Indian Federation Cup was the 34th season of the top knock-out competition in India. The qualifiers started in August while the final round took place from 19 September 2012 to 30 September 2012.

Salgaocar were the defending champions, having beaten East Bengal 3–1 in the 2011 Final.

DD Sports Friday agreed to telecast live the semifinals and final of the tournament.

The cup was eventually won by East Bengal after they defeated Dempo in the final on 30 September 2012.

== Teams ==
| Round | Clubs involved | Winners from previous round | New entries this round | Leagues entering at this round |
|---|---|---|---|---|
| Qualifiers | 6 | N/A | N/A | 2012 I-League 2nd Division final round + HAL |
| Group stage | 16 | 2 | 14 | I-League |
| Semi-finals | 4 | 4 | N/A | N/A |
| Final | 2 | 2 | N/A | N/A |

== Calendar ==
The calendar for the 2012 Indian Federation Cup, as announced by the All India Football Federation:

| Round | Main date | Number of fixtures | Clubs |
|---|---|---|---|
| Qualification | August | 6 | 6 |
| Group stage | 19–26 September | 24 | 16 |
| Semi-finals | 27–28 September | 2 | 4 |
| Final | 30 September | 1 | 2 |

== Qualifying rounds ==
All of the teams entering the competition that are not members of the I-League and have to compete in the qualifying rounds.

== Group stage ==
=== Group A ===
| Team | Pld | W | D | L | GF | GA | GD | Pts |
|---|---|---|---|---|---|---|---|---|
| Dempo | 3 | 2 | 1 | 0 | 5 | 1 | +4 | 7 |
| Pailan Arrows | 3 | 1 | 2 | 0 | 5 | 4 | +1 | 5 |
| Shillong Lajong | 3 | 1 | 0 | 2 | 2 | 2 | 0 | 3 |
| Mumbai | 3 | 0 | 1 | 2 | 3 | 7 | −4 | 1 |

=== Group B ===
| Team | Pld | W | D | L | GF | GA | GD | Pts |
|---|---|---|---|---|---|---|---|---|
| Churchill Brothers | 3 | 2 | 1 | 0 | 9 | 1 | +8 | 7 |
| Mohun Bagan | 3 | 1 | 1 | 1 | 2 | 3 | −1 | 4 |
| Mohammedan | 3 | 1 | 0 | 2 | 2 | 5 | −3 | 3 |
| Air India | 3 | 1 | 0 | 2 | 2 | 5 | −3 | 3 |

=== Group C ===
| Team | Pld | W | D | L | GF | GA | GD | Pts |
|---|---|---|---|---|---|---|---|---|
| East Bengal | 3 | 2 | 1 | 0 | 6 | 4 | +2 | 7 |
| ONGC | 3 | 2 | 0 | 1 | 8 | 4 | +4 | 6 |
| Sporting Goa | 3 | 1 | 1 | 1 | 5 | 5 | 0 | 4 |
| Kalighat MS | 3 | 0 | 0 | 3 | 6 | 12 | −6 | 0 |

=== Group D ===
| Team | Pld | W | D | L | GF | GA | GD | Pts |
|---|---|---|---|---|---|---|---|---|
| Salgaocar | 3 | 3 | 0 | 0 | 6 | 1 | +5 | 9 |
| Pune | 3 | 1 | 2 | 0 | 2 | 1 | +1 | 5 |
| Prayag United | 3 | 0 | 2 | 1 | 3 | 2 | +1 | 2 |
| United Sikkim | 3 | 0 | 0 | 3 | 0 | 6 | −6 | 0 |

== Semi-finals ==
| 27 September 2012 | Churchill Brothers | 0–1 (a.e.t.) | East Bengal | Kanchenjunga Stadium, Siliguri |
| 18:30 IST | | Report | Ralte 111' |

| 28 September 2012 | Dempo | 2–0 | Salgaocar | Kanchenjunga Stadium, Siliguri |
| 18:30 IST | Abranches 70'; Sakibo 84' | Report |

== Final ==
| 30 September 2012 | East Bengal | 3–2 (a.e.t.) | Dempo | Kanchenjunga Stadium, Siliguri |
| 18:30 IST | Mondal 60'; Singh 100'; Edeh 109' | Report | Lawrence 51'; Gawli 111' | Attendance: 35,000 (est) |

== Goalscorers ==
5 goals:

- (Nigeria) Chidi Edeh (East Bengal)

4 goals:

- (India) Manandeep Singh (East Bengal)
- (Nigeria) Koko Sakibo (Dempo)

3 goals:

- (India) Anthony D'Souza (Salgaocar)
- (Lebanon) Akram Moghrabi (Churchill Brothers)
- (India) Clifford Miranda (Dempo)
- (Liberia) Christopher Chizoba (Kalighat MS)
- (Japan) Katsumi Yusa (ONGC)
- (Nigeria) David Opara (Mumbai)

2 goals:

- (Brazil) Beto (Churchill Brothers)
- (India) Mohammed Rafique (Prayag United)
- (Liberia) James Gbilee (Kalighat MS)
- (Gabon) Henry Antchouet (Churchill Brothers)
- (India) Mackroy Peixote (Sporting Goa)
- (Nigeria) David Sunday (Mohammedan)
- (India) Holicharan Narzary (Pailan Arrows)
- (India) Dawson Fernandes (Sporting Goa)
- (Nigeria) Oneyama Eke (ONGC)

1 goal:

- (Brazil) Luciano Sabrosa (Salgaocar)
- (India) Bikramjit Singh (Churchill Brothers)
- (India) Climax Lawrence (Dempo)
- (India) Tanmoy Kundu (Kalighat MS)
- (India) Chinadorai Sabeeth (Mohun Bagan)
- (India) Lalmuanpuia (ONGC)
- (India) Prabir Das (Pailan Arrows)
- (India) Nicholas Colaco (Salgaocar)
- (Liberia) Johnny Menyongar (Shillong Lajong)
- (Nigeria) Gbeneme Friday (Shillong Lajong)
- (Costa Rica) Carlos Hernández (Prayag United)
- (India) Joaquim Abranches (Dempo)
- (India) Lalrindika Ralte (East Bengal)
- (India) Mohammed Mukhtar (Mohammedan)
- (India) Sachin Gawas (ONGC)
- (India) Dhanpal Ganeshan (Pailan Arrows)
- (India) Jeje Lalpekhlua (Pune)
- (India) Victorino Fernandes (Sporting Goa)
- (Nigeria) Junior Obagbemiro (Air India)
- (Nigeria) Ebi Sukore (Shillong Lajong)
- (India) Bineesh Balan (Churchill Brothers)
- (India) Mahesh Gawli (Dempo)
- (India) Arnab Mondal (East Bengal)
- (India) Manish Mathani (Mohan Bagan)
- (India) Tarif Ahmed (ONGC)
- (India) Deepak Devrani (Pailan Arrows)
- (India) Arata Izumi (Pune)
- (Ivory Coast) Pierre Djidjia Douhou (Pune)
- (Nigeria) Henry Ezeh (Air India)
- (Philippines) Ángel Guirado (Salgaocar)
