= 2012 Indian Federation Cup group stage =

This article details the 2012 Indian Federation Cup group stage.

The group stage features 16 teams: the 14 automatic qualifiers from the I-League and the 2 winners of the qualifiers.

The teams were drawn into four groups of four, and played each once in a round-robin format. The matchdays were from 19 September to 25 September.

The top team in each group advances to the Semi-Finals.

== Group A ==
Team	Pld	W	D	L	GF	GA	GD	Pts
Dempo	3	2	1	0	5	1	+4	7
Pailan Arrows	3	1	2	0	5	4	+1	5
Shillong Lajong	3	1	0	2	2	2	0	3
Mumbai	3	0	1	2	3	7	−4	1

19 September 2012
15:00 IST

Dempo	1 – 1	Pailan Arrows
Miranda 61'	Report	Narzary 52'

Keenan Stadium, Jamshedpur
19 September 2012
15:00 IST

Mumbai	1 – 2	Shillong Lajong
Opara 45+1'	Report	Menyongar 45' (pen.); Friday 90'

JRD Tata Sports Complex, Jamshedpur

21 September 2012
15:00 IST

Pailan Arrows	2 – 2	Mumbai
Ganeshan 45'; Devrani 78'	Report	Opara 12', 62'

Keenan Stadium, Jamshedpur
21 September 2012
15:00 IST

Shillong Lajong	0 – 1	Dempo
	Report	Miranda 45'

JRD Tata Sports Complex, Jamshedpur

23 September 2012
15:00 IST

Pailan Arrows	2 – 1	Shillong Lajong
Narzary 17'; Das 68'	Report	Sukore 20'

Keenan Stadium, Jamshedpur
23 September 2012
15:00 IST

Mumbai	0 – 4	Dempo
	Report	Miranda 45'; Sakibo 43', 79', 90'

JRD Tata Sports Complex, Jamshedpur

== Group B ==
Team	Pld	W	D	L	GF	GA	GD	Pts
Churchill Brothers	3	2	1	0	9	1	+8	7
Mohun Bagan	3	1	1	1	2	3	−1	4
Mohammedan	3	1	0	2	2	5	−3	3
Air India	3	1	0	2	2	5	−3	3

20 September 2012
15:00 IST

Air India	0 – 1	Mohammedan
	Report	Mukhtar 55'

Kanchenjunga Stadium, Siliguri
20 September 2012
19:00 IST

Churchill Brothers	0 – 0	Mohun Bagan
	Report

Kanchenjunga Stadium, Siliguri

22 September 2012
15:00 IST

Mohammedan	1 – 5	Churchill Brothers
Sunday 38'	Report	Moghrabi 13', 40'; Balan 27'; Beto 33'; Antchouet 88'

Kanchenjunga Stadium, Siliguri
22 September 2012
19:00 IST

Mohun Bagan	0 – 2	Air India
	Report	Obagbemiro 28'; Ezeh 85'

Kanchenjunga Stadium, Siliguri

24 September 2012
15:00 IST

Air India	0 – 4	Churchill Brothers
	Report	Antchouet 22'; Beto 64'; Moghrabi 84'; Singh 90'

Kanchenjunga Stadium, Siliguri
24 September 2012
19:00 IST

Mohun Bagan	2 – 1	Mohammedan
Sabeeth 49'; Mathani 52'	Report	Sunday 63'

Kanchenjunga Stadium, Siliguri

== Group C ==
Team	Pld	W	D	L	GF	GA	GD	Pts
East Bengal	3	2	1	0	6	4	+2	7
ONGC	3	2	0	1	8	4	+4	6
Sporting Goa	3	1	1	1	5	5	0	4
Kalighat MS	3	0	0	3	6	12	−6	0

21 September 2012
15:00 IST

ONGC	5 – 1	Kalighat MS
Gawas 31'; Eke 37', 40'; Yusa 80', 89'	Report	Gbilee 15'

Kanchenjunga Stadium, Siliguri
21 September 2012
19:00 IST

Sporting Goa	1 – 1	East Bengal
Fernandes 82'	Report	Edeh 10' (pen.)

Kanchenjunga Stadium, Siliguri

23 September 2012
15:00 IST

Kalighat MS	2 – 3	Sporting Goa
Chizoba 38', 72'	Report	Peixote 14', 45'; Fernandes 42' (pen.)

Kanchenjunga Stadium, Siliguri
23 September 2012
19:00 IST

East Bengal	2 – 1	ONGC
Edeh 45+2'; Singh 80'	Report	Yusa 11'

Kanchenjunga Stadium, Siliguri

25 September 2012
15:00 IST

East Bengal	4 – 3	Kalighat MS
Singh 26', 30'; Edeh 45', 60' (pen.)	Report	Gbilee 11'; Kundu 16'; Chizoba 40'

Kanchenjunga Stadium, Siliguri
25 September 2012
15:00 IST

ONGC	2 – 1	Sporting Goa
Lalmuanpuia 30'; Ahmed 90'	Report	Fernandes 62' (pen.)

SSB Ground, Ranidanga

== Group D ==
Team	Pld	W	D	L	GF	GA	GD	Pts
Salgaocar	3	3	0	0	6	1	+5	9
Pune	3	1	2	0	2	1	+1	5
Prayag United	3	0	2	1	3	2	+1	2
United Sikkim	3	0	0	3	0	6	−6	0

20 September 2012
15:00 IST

Salgaocar	1 – 0	Prayag United
D'Souza 64'	Report

JRD Tata Sports Complex, Jamshedpur
20 September 2012
15:00 IST

Pune	1 – 0	United Sikkim
Lalpekhlua 51'	Report

Keenan Stadium, Jamshedpur

22 September 2012
15:00 IST

Prayag United	1 – 1	Pune
Hernández 13'	Report	Izumi 62'

JRD Tata Sports Complex, Jamshedpur
22 September 2012
15:00 IST

United Sikkim	0 – 3	Salgaocar
	Report	Guirado 2'; Colaco 81'; D'Souza 85'

Keenan Stadium, Jamshedpur

24 September 2012
15:00 IST

Prayag United	2 – 0	United Sikkim
Rafique 6', 14'	Report

Keenan Stadium, Jamshedpur
24 September 2012
15:00 IST

Pune	1 – 2	Salgaocar
Douhou 12'	Report	Sabrosa 7'; D'Souza 27'

JRD Tata Sports Complex, Jamshedpur
