= 2011–12 I-League =

5th season of the I-League

I-League
- Season: 2011–12
- Champions: Dempo; 3rd I-League title 5th Indian title
- Relegated: Chirag Club Kerala; HAL
- AFC Cup: East Bengal; Churchill Brothers
- Matches: 182
- Goals: 521 (2.86 per match)
- Top goalscorer: Ranti Martins (32 goals)
- Biggest home win: Dempo 5-0 Mohun Bagan
- Biggest away win: HAL 1-8 East Bengal
- Highest scoring: HAL 1-8 East Bengal
- Longest winning run: 7 games Dempo
- Longest unbeaten run: 7 games Dempo
- Longest losing run: 6 games Chirag United Kerala
- Highest attendance: 90,000; Mohun Bagan 1-0 East Bengal

The 2011–12 I-League was the fifth season of the I-League. The season began in October 2011 and ended in May 2012. Salgaocar are the defending champions, having won their maiden title in the previous season.

The current edition has a total of 14 teams contesting for the honors. These include the top twelve teams from the 2010–11 season along with the two promoted sides, Shillong Lajong and Sporting Clube de Goa, who had been the winner and the runner-up in the 2011 I-League 2nd Division respectively.

== Teams ==
According to the AIFF's rules, the two bottom-most teams from the 2010–11 season-ending points table were supposed to be relegated to the second tier, but in actuality, only ONGC FC were relegated after their second to last place finish, while the team finishing the last, JCT FC decided to disband their senior football team at the close of the session.

Shillong Lajong FC and Sporting Clube de Goa, the Champions & Runner-up respectively, of the 2011 I-League 2nd Division, were promoted to the I-League after being relegated only the previous year.

=== Stadiums and locations ===
Locations of teams in the 2011-12 I-League

Team	Location	Stadium	Capacity
Air India	Mumbai	Cooperage Ground	12,000
Chirag United Kerala	Kozhikode	Kaloor International Stadium	60,000
Churchill Brothers	Salcette	Fatorda Stadium	27,300
Dempo	Panjim	Fatorda Stadium	27,300
East Bengal	Kolkata	Salt Lake Stadium	120,000
HAL	Bangalore	Bangalore Football Stadium	15,000
Mohun Bagan	Kolkata	Salt Lake Stadium	120,000
Mumbai	Mumbai	Cooperage Ground	12,000
Pailan Arrows	Kolkata	Salt Lake Stadium	120,000
Prayag United	Kolkata	Salt Lake Stadium	120,000
Pune	Pune	Balewadi Sports Complex	20,000
Salgaocar	Vasco	Fatorda Stadium	27,300
Shillong Lajong	Shillong	Jawaharlal Nehru Stadium	25,000
Sporting Goa	Panjim	Fatorda Stadium	27,300

=== Managerial changes ===
In chronological order from the bottom

Team	Outgoing manager	Manner of departure	Date of vacancy	Position in table	Incoming manager	Date of appointment
Mohun Bagan	(India) Subhash Bhowmick	Caretaker	1 June 2011	Pre-season	(England) Steve Darby	19 July 2011
Churchill Brothers	(Croatia) Drago Mamic	Caretaker	1 June 2011	Pre-season	(Portugal) Manuel Gomes	9 June 2011
Pailan Arrows	(Scotland) Des Bulpin	Sacked	13 August 2011	Pre-season	(India) Sukhwinder Singh	13 August 2011
Chirag United Kerala	(India) P. K. Unnikrishnan	Sacked	1 October 2011	Pre-season	(Sri Lanka) Pakir Ali	2 October 2011
Mohun Bagan	(England) Steve Darby	Resigned	15 October 2011	Pre-Season	(India) Prasanta Banerjee	18 October 2011
Pailan Arrows	(India) Sukhwinder Singh	Resigned	7 February 2012	13th	(India) Sujit Chakravarty	8 February 2012
Churchill Brothers	(Portugal) Manuel Gomes	Sacked	14 February 2012	5th	(Brazil) Carlos Roberto Pereira	15 February 2012
Chirag United Kerala	(Sri Lanka) Pakir Ali	Sacked	18 February 2012	12th	(India) Biswajit Bhattacharya	18 February 2012

=== Foreign players ===
Club	Player 1	Player 2	Player 3	Asian Player
Air India	(Nigeria) Henry Ezeh	(Senegal) Lamine Tamba		(Japan) Takayuki Omi
Chirag United Kerala	(Ghana) Isaac Boakye	(Ghana) Charles Dzisah	(Nigeria) David Sunday	None
Churchill Brothers	(Brazil) Roberto Mendes Silva	(Gabon) Henry Antchouet	(Nigeria) David Opara	(Australia) Antun Kovacic
Dempo	(Nigeria) Ranty Martins	(Nigeria) Koko Sakibo	(Trinidad and Tobago) Densill Theobald	(Japan) Yusuke Kato
East Bengal	(Brazil) Edmilson	(Nigeria) Uga Samuel Okpara	(Nigeria) Penn Orji	(Australia) Tolgay Özbey
HAL	(Nigeria) Joseph Femi Adeola			(Nepal) Rohit Chand
Mohun Bagan	(Brazil) Jose Ramirez Barreto	(Brazil) Hudson Lima Silva	(Nigeria) Odafa Onyeka Okolie	None
Mumbai	(Nigeria) Kingsley Chioma	(Nigeria) Gbeneme Friday	(Nigeria) Ebi Sukore	(Afghanistan) Zohib Islam Amiri
Pailan Arrows	Pailan Arrows don't use foreigners as they are an Indian Developmental Side			
Prayag United	(Brazil) Josimar	(Ghana) Yusif Yakubu	(Nigeria) Bello Razaq	(Japan) Kayne Vincent (Note: Prayag United are allowed up to four foreign players (per I-League rules), one of which must be from Asia. Despite being a New Zealander and having represented them at youth international level Kayne Vincent is considered Japanese due to his Japanese mother.)
Pune	(Guinea) Keita Mandjou	(Ivory Coast) Pierre Djidjia Douhou	(Nigeria) Chika Wali	(Japan) Arata Izumi
Salgaocar	(Brazil) Luciano Sabrosa	(France) Maxime Belouet	(Nigeria) Chidi Edeh	(Japan) Ryuji Sueoka
Shillong Lajong	(Liberia) James Gbilee	(Liberia) Johnny Menyongar	(Nigeria) Christopher Chizoba	(Australia) Matthew Mayora
Sporting Goa	(Guinea) Boubacar Keita	(Nigeria) Ogba Kalu Nnanna	(South Sudan) James Moga	(South Korea) Park Jae-hyun

=== Ownership changes ===
Club	New owner	Previous owner	Date
Pailan Arrows	(India) Pailan Group	All India Football Federation	31 July 2011
Prayag United	(India) Prayag Group	(India) RP-Chirag	3 August 2011
Chirag United Kerala	(India) Chirag Computers	(India) Viva Kerala Group	7 August 2011
Shillong Lajong	(United Arab Emirates) Anglian Holdings (20% stake)^{1}		29 February 2012

- ^{1}: Anglian Holdings only brought 20% in Shillong Lajong. The rest of the club is still owned by Shillong Lajong plc.

== League table ==
Pos	Team	Pld	W	D	L	GF	GA	GD	Pts	Qualification or relegation
1	Dempo (C)	26	18	3	5	59	21	+38	57	
2	East Bengal	26	15	6	5	46	22	+24	51	2013 AFC Cup Group stage (Note: East Bengal, the winner of the 2012 Indian Federation Cup, qualified for the 2013 AFC Cup.)
3	Churchill Brothers	26	14	6	6	47	28	+19	48	2013 AFC Cup Group stage (Note: Dempo refused to enter the 2013 AFC Cup, so they were replaced by Churchill Brothers.)
4	Mohun Bagan	26	13	8	5	51	32	+19	47	
5	Pune	26	13	7	6	44	34	+10	46	
6	Salgaocar	26	12	8	6	32	19	+13	44	
7	Prayag United	26	11	9	6	41	32	+9	42	
8	Sporting Goa	26	11	7	8	53	43	+10	40	
9	Air India	26	9	5	12	30	37	−7	32	
10	Shillong Lajong	26	7	7	12	24	44	−20	28	
11	Mumbai	26	7	3	16	31	52	−21	24	
12	Chirag United Kerala (R)	26	6	2	18	28	50	−22	20	Relegation to 2013 I-League 2nd Division (Note: Pailan Arrows were not relegated in the season as they were a developmental team.)
13	Pailan Arrows	26	2	10	14	17	40	−23	16	
14	HAL (R)	26	1	5	20	19	68	−49	8	Relegation to 2013 I-League 2nd Division

Source: IndiaFooty.com
Rules for classification: 1) points; 2) goal difference; 3) number of goals scored.
(C) Champions; (R) Relegated

== Season charity ==
IMG Reliance and the I-League have joined hands with the polio eradication campaign India Unite to End Polio Now. IUEPN is an initiative of Aidmatrix Foundation, supported by UNICEF, and a collaborative effort between the Ministry of Health and Family Welfare (MOHFW), World Health Organization (WHO), National Polio Surveillance Project (NPSP), Rotary International and US Centre for Disease Control (CDC).

== Season statistics ==
=== Top scorers ===
Rank	Player	Club	Goals
1	(Nigeria) Ranti Martins	Dempo	32
2	(Nigeria) Odafa Onyeka Okolie	Mohun Bagan	26
3	(Australia) Tolgay Özbey	East Bengal	18
3	(Gabon) Henry Antchouet	Churchill Brothers	18
5	(South Sudan) James Moga	Sporting Goa	16
5	(Guinea) Mandjou Keita	Pune	16
7	(Ghana) Yusif Yakubu	Prayag United	12
8	(Brazil) Josimar	Prayag United	11
8	(Nigeria) Ogba Kalu	Sporting Goa	11
10	(Nigeria) Gbeneme Friday	Mumbai	10
10	(Nigeria) David Sunday	Chirag United Kerala	10

=== Top Indian scorers ===
Rank	Player	Club	Goals
1	(India) Chinadorai Sabeeth	Pailan Arrows	9
1	(India) Manandeep Singh	Air India	9
3	(India) Abdul Hamza	HAL	8
3	(India) C.K. Vineeth	Chirag United Kerala	8
5	(India) Sandesh Gadkari	Air India	7
5	(India) Subhash Singh	Pune	7
7	(India) Dawson Fernandes	Sporting Goa	6
7	(India) Clifford Miranda	Dempo	6
7	(India) Lalrindika Ralte	Churchill Brothers	6

=== Hat-tricks ===
Player	For	Against	Result	Date
(Nigeria) Odafa Onyeka Okolie	Mohun Bagan	Pailan Arrows	3–1	23 October 2011
(South Sudan) James Moga	Sporting Clube de Goa	Salgaocar	4–2	5 November 2011
(Brazil) Josimar	Prayag United	Pune	5–1	5 November 2011
(Australia) Tolgay Özbey	East Bengal	HAL	8–1	23 November 2011
(Gabon) Henry Antchouet	Churchill Brothers	Shillong Lajong	6–0	17 December 2011
(Nigeria) David Opara	Churchill Brothers	Sporting Clube de Goa	5–0	28 December 2011
(Nigeria) Odafa Onyeka Okolie	Mohun Bagan	Churchill Brothers	3–2	15 January 2012
(Nigeria) David Opara	Churchill Brothers	Chirag United Kerala	4–0	4 April 2012
(Nepal) Rohit Chand	HAL	Pune	4–6	10 April 2012
(Nigeria) Gbeneme Friday	Mumbai	HAL	5–1	14 April 2012
(Nigeria) David Sunday	Chirag United Kerala	East Bengal	3–4	16 April 2012
(India) Chinadorai Sabeeth	Pailan Arrows	Chirag United Kerala	3–0	25 April 2012

=== Scoring ===
- First goal of the season: C.K. Vineeth for Chirag United Club Kerala against HAL (22 October 2011)
- Fastest goal of the season: 3 minutes – Anthony Pereira for Dempo against Shillong Lajong (23 November 2011)
- Widest winning margin: 7 goals
  - HAL 1-8 East Bengal (23 November 2011)
- Most goals scored in a match by a single team: 10 goals
  - Pune 6-4 HAL (10 April 2012)
- Most goals scored in a match by a losing team: 4 goals
  - Pune 6-4 HAL (10 April 2012)
- Most goals scored in a match by a single player: 4 goals
  - Tolgay Özbey for East Bengal against HAL (23 November 2011)
  - Gbeneme Friday for Mumbai against HAL (14 April 2012)

== End-of-season awards ==
- Fan's Player of the Year — (India) Francis Fernandes
- FPAI Young Player of the Year — (India) Manandeep Singh
- FPAI Foreign Player of the Year — (Nigeria) Ranti Martins
- FPAI Indian Player of the Year — (India) Syed Rahim Nabi
- FPAI Coach of the Year — (England) Trevor Morgan

== FPAI Team of the Year ==
Formation: 4-4-2

Nat.	Position	Name	Club
(India)	GK	Karanjit Singh	Salgaocar
(India)	RB	Deepak Kumar Mondal	Prayag United
(India)	CB	Mahesh Gawli	Dempo
(Nigeria)	CB	Uga Okpara	East Bengal
(India)	LB	Syed Rahim Nabi	Mohun Bagan
(India)	RM	Rocus Lamare	Salgaocar
(Ivory Coast)	CM	Pierre Djidjia Douhou	Pune
(Brazil)	CM	Beto	Churchill Brothers
(Nigeria)	LM	Penn Orji	East Bengal
(Nigeria)	ST	Odafa Onyeka Okolie	Mohun Bagan
(Nigeria)	ST	Ranti Martins	Dempo
(England)	Coach	Trevor Morgan	East Bengal
