= 2012 Indian Federation Cup qualifiers =

This article details the 2012 Indian Federation Cup qualifiers.

== Format ==
The qualifiers will start from 11 September to 16 September 2012 and will consist of 6 teams, 5 of which played in the 2012 I-League 2nd Division final round and the other one being HAL Sporting Club who were relegated from the 2011–12 I-League season. All 6 teams are divided into two groups of 3. The top team from each group moves on to the Cup proper.

== Teams ==
Team	2012 2nd Division position	2011–12 I-League position
Aizawl	7th	N/A
Kalighat MS	5th	N/A
HAL	N/A	14th
Mohammedan	3rd	N/A
Royal Wahingdoh	4th	N/A
Vasco	6th	N/A

== Matches ==
=== Group A ===
Team	Pld	W	D	L	GF	GA	GD	Pts
Mohammedan	2	2	0	0	10	1	+5	6
Aizawl	2	1	0	1	6	7	–1	3
HAL	2	0	0	2	1	9	–8	0

11 September 2012

Mohammedan	6 – 1	Aizawl
Mukhtar 12'; Laldinpuia 17' (o.g.); Sunday 21'; Jaryan 22', 52'; Biswas 89'	Report	Zonuntluanga 56'

JRD Tata Sports Complex, Jamshedpur

13 September 2012

Aizawl	5 – 1	HAL
Lalremruata 22'; Lalrintluanga 29', 65'; Lalfakzuala 53'; Zonuntlunga 87'	Report	Prakash 25'

JRD Tata Sports Complex, Jamshedpur

15 September 2012

HAL	0 – 4	Mohammedan
	Report	Gadimch 37', 42', 47'; Biswas 88'

JRD Tata Sports Complex, Jamshedpur

=== Group B ===
Team	Pld	W	D	L	GF	GA	GD	Pts
Kalighat MS	2	2	0	0	6	0	+9	6
Royal Wahingdoh	2	1	0	1	4	8	-4	3
Vasco	2	0	0	2	3	8	-5	0

12 September 2012
15:30 IST

Kalighat MS	6 – 0	Royal Wahingdoh
Chizoba 3', 45', 55', 88'; Gbilee 9'; Kundu 49'

JRD Tata Sports Complex, Jamshedpur

14 September 2012
15:30 IST

Vasco	1 – 4	Kalighat MS
Fernandes 69'	Report	Gbilee 3'; Chizoba 29', 41'; Kundu 45+1'

JRD Tata Sports Complex, Jamshedpur

16 September 2012

Royal Wahingdoh	4 – 2	Vasco
Lalnunpuia 18', 20'; Singh 29'; Di Silva 60'	Report	Colaco 57'; Mascarenhes 87'

JRD Tata Sports Complex, Jamshedpur
