= Film City =

Film City may refer to

- Film City, Mumbai
- Film City, Qatar
- Noida Film City
- Ramoji Film City, Hyderabad
- Prayag Film City, West Bengal
