= Isaac Boakye (disambiguation) =

Isaac Boakye (born 1981) is a Ghanaian former professional footballer.

Isaac Boakye may also refer to:

- Isaac Boakye (footballer, born 1997), Ghanaian footballer
- Isaac Boakye (footballer, born 1984), Ghanaian footballer
