= Jibon Singh Khangebam =

Indian footballer (born 1990)

Jibon Singh
Personal information
- Full name: Jibon Singh Khangebam
- Date of birth: 6 February 1990 (age 36)
- Place of birth: Manipur, India
- Height: 1.78 m (5 ft 10 in)
- Position: Left back

Youth career
- 2009: East Bengal

Senior career*
Years	Team	Apps	(Gls)
2010–2012	Pailan Arrows	15	(0)
2012–2015	Shillong Lajong	6	(1)
2014	→NorthEast United (loan)		
2015–2016	NEROCA FC		

International career
2009	India U23	5	(1)
2010	India	1	(1)
- * Club domestic league appearances and goals as of 20 May 2015

Jibon Singh Khangebam (Meitei: Khangebam Jibon Singh, born 6 February 1990) is an Indian footballer who plays for Shillong Lajong in the I-League. He plays as a left back or in midfield positions. Singh represented India U23 in the SAFF Cup 2009 and 2012 AFC Pre-Olympic Tournament in 2011.

== Career ==
=== Pailan Arrows ===
For the 2010-11 I-League season Singh played for I-League newcomers Indian Arrows, a team made up exclusively of Indian Under-19 players. On 3 December 2010 Singh took part in the Arrows' first ever I-League game against Chirag United. The final score was 2–1 in Chirag United's favor.

Singh started off the 2011-12 football season in the 2011 Indian Federation Cup with renamed Pailan Arrows. He was selected as the captain of team for 2011–12 season. In Pailan's first match against HAL S.C., Singh scored the only goal of the game in the 89th minute from the penalty spot which left Pailan the 1–0 winners.

=== Shillong Lajong F.C. ===
For the 2012-13 I-League season, Singh played for Shillong Lajong F.C. He scored his first goal for the club in the I-League's 5th round against Dempo, but Shillong lost that match, with 4-1 the final score.

=== International ===
On 23 February 2011, Singh played his second game for the Indian U23 against Myanmar.

== Statistics ==
=== Club ===
Updated 29 December 2011

Club	Season	League			Cup*			International			Total		
Club	Season	Apps	Goals	Assists	Apps	Goals	Assists	Apps	Goals	Assists	Apps	Goals	Assists
Pailan Arrows	2010–11	5	0	0	0	0	0	0	0	0	5	0	0
Pailan Arrows	2011-12	10	0	0	3	2	0	0	0	0	13	2	0
Career total		15	0	0	3	2	0	0	0	0	18	2	0

=== National team ===
Statistics accurate as of 25 December 2011

India national team
Year	Apps	Goals
2010	1	1
2011	0	0
Total	1	1

== Honours ==
India U23

- SAFF Championship: 2009
