= Kingsley Chioma =

Nigerian retired footballer

Personal information
- Full name: Kingsley Chukwu Chioma
- Date of birth: 20 October 1984 (age 42)
- Place of birth: Ibadan, Nigeria
- Position: Defender

Senior career*
Years	Team	Apps	(Gls)
2005	Persib Bandung		
2006–2007	Persibom Bolaang Mongondow		
2011	Mumbai F.C.		(1)
2013	Persis Solo (trial)		
- * Club domestic league appearances and goals

Kingsley Chukwu Chioma (born 20 October 1984 in Nigeria) is a Nigerian retired footballer. He played for Mumbai F.C. under 2011–12 I-League in India and he also played for Persib Bandung under 2005 Liga Indonesia Premier Division in 2005.

== India ==
Receiving a red card as Mumbai conceded to Shillong Lajong 1-2, Mumbai mentor Khalid Jamil complained that the suspension could have been avoided as Chioma's fouls were unintentional but did not take punitive actions against the referee. Absent from the Mumbaikars by December 2011, he was found to have not been paid a month's wages but it is unknown whether they have been owed or not.

== Indonesia ==
Taken on by Persib Bandung close to the middle of 2005, the sweeper was one of twelve offloaded by Maung Bandung that November.

Monitored by Persis Solo in advance of the 2013 Liga Indonesia Premier Division, the fullback failed to impress them, lacking speed.
