= Arnab Mondal =

Indian footballer (born 1989)

Personal information
- Full name: Arnab Kumar Mondal
- Date of birth: 25 September 1989 (age 37)
- Place of birth: Garden Reach, West Bengal, India
- Height: 1.79 m (5 ft 10 1/2 in)
- Position: Centre back

Youth career
- 2007–2010: Mohammedan SC

Senior career*
Years	Team	Apps	(Gls)
2010–2012	Prayag United	28	(3)
2012–2018	East Bengal	103	(10)
2014–2016	→ ATK (loan)	41	(0)
2018–2019	ATK	6	(0)

International career^{‡}
2011	India U23	2	(0)
2013–2016	India	27	(1)
- * Club domestic league appearances and goals as of 5 December 2016 ‡ National team caps and goals as of 10:38, 4 June 2018 (UTC)

Arnab Kumar Mondal (Bengali: অর্ণব কুমার মণ্ডল; born 25 September 1989) is an Indian former professional footballer who played as a centre back.

== Early life ==
Born in Garden Reach, a neighborhood based in Kolkata, West Bengal, Mondal joined the youth team of Mohammedan at the age of 17.

== Club career ==
=== Prayag United ===
In 2010, he signed for Prayag United of the I-League and played for the club for two seasons. For the 2011–12 season, Mondal created a partnership in the center of defense Bello Razaq and was also taken under the wing of India international Deepak Mondal.

=== East Bengal ===
During the summer of 2012, Mondal left Prayag United and joined Kolkata rivals East Bengal. He was quick to become a part of the club's history as he was a goalscorer during the club's 2012 Federation Cup Final match against Dempo. Mondal scored the equalizing goal for East Bengal in the 60th minute that lead to East Bengal winning 3–2 and the Federation Cup. Mondal soon became a mainstay for East Bengal in their backline, partnering with Uga Okpara, as East Bengal held the best defense in the I-League halfway through the campaign. However, due to an injury picked up with the national team, Mondal missed the majority of the second half of the season as East Bengal failed to win the title. Mondal came back from injury to return to East Bengal's starting line-up for the 2013–14 season. He was considered one of the club's finest players that season as he started in 18 of the club's matches that league campaign.

==== 2014–16: Loan to Atlético de Kolkata ====
In July 2014, it was announced that Mondal would be among 84 Indian players who would be a part of the 2014 ISL Inaugural Domestic Draft, being available on loan from East Bengal. On 22 July 2014, he was drafted in the second round of the draft by Atlético de Kolkata. During the 2014 ISL season, Mondal helped the side reach the final against Kerala Blasters, helping his side to a 1–0 victory at the DY Patil Stadium. In 2018–19 Arnab Mondal again decided to join ATK after suffering a bad season with East Bengal.

== International career ==
Mondal made his first start for the India U23 against Qatar U-23 in the 2012 Summer Olympics Qualifiers. Arnab was declared the captain of the senior national team for the World Cup Qualifiers against Oman on 10 June 2015 by coach Stephen Constantine.

== Career statistics ==
=== Club ===
As of 5 December 2016

Club	Season	League			League Cup		Domestic Cup		Continental		Total	
Club	Season	Division	Apps	Goals	Apps	Goals	Apps	Goals	Apps	Goals	Apps	Goals
East Bengal	2012–13	I-League	21	0	—	—	1	1	6	0	28	1
East Bengal	2013–14	I-League	20	0	—	—	2	0	—	—	22	0
East Bengal	2014–15	I-League	16	0	—	—	4	0	2	0	22	0
East Bengal	2015–16	I-League	13	0	—	—	2	0	—	—	15	0
East Bengal	East Bengal Total		70	0	0	0	8	1	10	0	88	1
Atlético de Kolkata (loan)	2014	ISL	16	0	—	—	—	—	—	—	16	0
Atlético de Kolkata (loan)	2015	ISL	12	0	—	—	—	—	—	—	13	0
Atlético de Kolkata (loan)	2016	ISL	12	0	—	—	—	—	—	—	12	0
Atlético de Kolkata (loan)	Atlético de Kolkata Total		40	0	0	0	0	0	0	0	41	0
Career total			111	0	0	0	8	1	10	0	129	1

=== International ===
As of 4 June 2018

India national team
Year	Apps	Goals
2013	8	1
2014	2	0
2015	10	0
2016	5	0
2017	2	0
Total	27	1

==== International goals ====
India score listed first, score column indicates score after each Fernandes goal.

International goals by date, venue, cap, opponent, score, result and competition
No.	Date	Venue	Opponent	Score	Result	Competition
1	9 September 2013	Dasarath Rangasala Stadium, Kathmandu, Nepal	Maldives	0–1	0–1	2013 SAFF Championship

== Honours ==
East Bengal

- Federation Cup: 2012–13

Atlético de Kolkata

- Indian Super League: 2014, 2016

India

- SAFF Championship: 2015; runner-up: 2013
