= Stephen Offei =

Ghanaian footballer

Personal information
- Full name: Stephen Offei
- Date of birth: 14 January 1986 (age 40)
- Place of birth: Ghana
- Height: 1.87 m (6 ft 2 in)
- Position: Centreback

Youth career
- Sahara FC Kumasi

Senior career*
Years	Team	Apps	(Gls)
2001–2009	Accra Hearts of Oak		
2004–2005	→ Litex Lovech (loan)	4	(0)
2008–2009	→ Hapoel Petah Tikva (loan)	27	(1)
2009	Maccabi Netanya	3	(0)
2010–2012	Maccabi Be'er Sheva	15	(0)
2012	Dempo	8	(1)
2013–2014	Vasco	13	(1)

International career^{‡}
2007	Ghana U23	5	(0)
2009	Ghana	2	(0)
- * Club domestic league appearances and goals as of 7 August 2001 ‡ National team caps and goals as of 7 August 2007

Stephen Offei (born 14 January 1986 in Ghana) is a Ghanaian former professional association footballer who played as a centreback. He last played for Vasco S.C. in the Goa Professional League. He represented Ghana national football team in two international matches.

== Career ==
Stephen Offei started his career in youth level in Kumasi club Sahara FC.In 2001 made his first domestic transfer to Accra Hearts of Oak and in his first three seasons there was the most capped player for the club. He played for the Ghana national U-23 team during the 2007 All African Games in Algeria and made his first cap for the Ghana Black Stars against Iran in 2008. He had loans from Accra Hearts of Oak in Bulgaria to PFC Litex Lovech in 2004 and in 2008 with Hapoel Petah Tikva F.C. In 2009, he moved permanent in Israel and sign for Premier League side Maccabi Netanya and after completed season moved to Maccabi Be'er Sheva having a successful year. In 2011, he travelled to China and was so close to finalize a deal with Shanghai Shenhua current club of Nicolas Anelka & Didier Drogba but could not meet the transfers deadline and in September 2012 signed a 1-year contract with India I-League Champions Dempo S.C and performed in 8 Goa league games having a goal in the opener game against his current team. After being released from Dempo he signed a contract with Vasco S.C. that will keep him in India until May 2013.

Offei is well known in Ghana for his mentoring sessions actions and youth football development.

== Honours ==
- Ghana Premier League: 2

2005–06, 2006–07

== Charity work ==
Mentoring sessions and donations made to Future For All Foundation, An NGO in Ghana that supports youth football development at the grassroot level.
