= Lalrindika Ralte =

Indian footballer (born 1992)

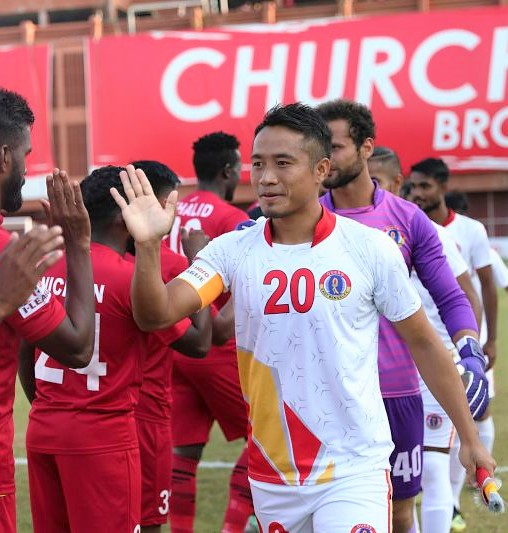
- Dika with East Bengal in 2019

Personal information
- Full name: Lalrindika Ralte
- Date of birth: 7 September 1992 (age 34)
- Place of birth: Lunglei, Mizoram, India
- Height: 1.73 m (5 ft 8 in)
- Position: Attacking midfielder

Youth career
- 2004-2009: IFA Academy

Senior career*
Years	Team	Apps	(Gls)
2009–2012	Churchill Brothers	18	(7)
2010–2011	→ Pailan Arrows (loan)	7	(3)
2012–2017	East Bengal	90	(18)
2014	→ Mumbai City (loan)	14	(1)
2015	→ Mumbai City (loan)	0	(0)
2016	→ Atlético Kolkata (loan)	13	(1)
2017–2018	NorthEast United	12	(0)
2018–2020	East Bengal	42	(4)
2021	Real Kashmir	10	(1)
Total		205	(35)

International career^{‡}
2007–2008	India U16	7	(3)
2009	India U19	5	(2)
2011–2014	India U23	9	(1)
2011–2022	India	16	(0)
- * Club domestic league appearances and goals as of 25 March 2021 ‡ National team caps and goals as of 16:49, 17 March 2015 (UTC)

Lalrindika Ralte (born 7 September 1992), popularly known as Dika, is a former Indian professional footballer who last played as an attacking midfielder for Real Kashmir in the I-League.

Born in a small town in Mizoram, India, he began playing football at a young age. During his career, he was regarded as one of the more prominent footballers from the region, noted for his left-footed play and proficiency in set pieces. He also became popular among supporters of East Bengal, known as the "Red and Golds", for his technical ability and goal-scoring performances.

== Club career ==
=== Churchill Brothers and Pailan Arrows ===
Ralte started his career at Churchill Brothers in 2009 and scored his first professional goal for the club on 1 April 2010 against JCT in the I-League in a 6–0 win. Ralte signed for Pailan Arrows on a season-long loan for the 2010–11 season. He scored his first goal for the Arrows on 3 December 2010 against Prayag United in Arrows' first ever professional match in the I-League. Ralte then scored a brace for the Arrows on 7 May 2011 against Mumbai to help Arrows win 2–1.

Ralte moved back to Churchill for the 2011-12 I-League after his year-long loan and on 1 November 2011, scored his first goal since his return against Prayag United at the Fatorda Stadium to help Churchill draw the match 1–1 in the I-League. He then scored again on 17 December 2011 against Shillong Lajong in the I-League to help Churchill to a 6–0 win. He would then score on 15 January 2012 against Mohun Bagan in the I-League in a 2–3 loss. while he continued to play regular football and impressed, he did not score again until 1 April 2012, when he scored against Prayag United at the Fatorda Stadium again in a 5–2 victory. He scored his 5th goal of the season 15 days later on 15 April 2012 against Pune in a 2–0 away victory. He then scored his last goal of the season on 6 May 2012 against his former club, Pailan Arrows, in the 50th minute in a match that ended 3–2 in favor of his team.

=== East Bengal ===
Dika signed for East Bengal in May 2012 and made his debut for the club on 21 September 2012 against Sporting Goa in the first match of the 2012 Federation Cup, coming on as a 70th-minute substitute for Ishfaq Ahmed. It did not take him long to make a huge contribution to the team as he scored the solitary goal in the semi-final of the Federation Cup on 27 September 2012 against his former team, Churchill Brothers, in the 111th minute of extra-time to send them into the final, which East Bengal would eventually go onto win 3–2 over Dempo in Siliguri. He then scored his first I-League goal for East Bengal in the second match of the season on 11 October 2012 against United Sikkim at the Paljor Stadium in Gangtok from an 82nd-minute free kick in a 1–0 win. He scored his second goal for the club on 24 November 2012 against ONGC at the Salt Lake Stadium in a convincing 5–0 win. On 27 February 2013, he scored his first goal in continental competitions in the 2013 AFC Cup against Selangor FA in a 1–0 home win for East Bengal; a left-footed striker from outside the box, beating the Malaysian goalkeeper Norazlan Razali on the 43rd minute. On 9 April 2013, he scored a 25-yard long curling left-footer on the 86th minute to secure a 2–1 home win over Tampines Rovers FC in the AFC Cup group stage. Ralte then would score his fourth goal of the AFC Cup against Kuwait SC on 1 October 2013 in the away leg of the 2013 AFC Cup semi-final match with a right-footed shot from the left of the box. With the goal against Kuwait SC, he became the joint highest Indian scorer of the tournament with Bhaichung Bhutia.

==== Mumbai City(loan) ====
Ralte was picked up by Mumbai City on loan for the 2014 Indian Super League as one of the most expensive signings. He started in Mumbai City FC's first ever game against Atletico de Kolkata. He assisted teammate Andre Moritz twice in a 5–0 win over derby rivals FC Pune City. Dika scored his first goal for Mumbai City on 7 December 2014 against Atletico de Kolkata in a 2–1 win.

=== Return to East Bengal ===
In 2018 July, East Bengal announced the return of Didika before the Calcutta Football League. He came on as a substitute in the Kolkata Derby when East Bengal was trailing by 2 goals against Mohun Bagan and changed the whole equation also providing the assist for the equaliser where the game ended 2-2. He was appointed as the captain. He led his team to the runners-up spot missing the I-League championship just by a point to Chennai City in the 2018-19 season which was decided on the final day.
He joined Real Kashmir in 2021 January for a one-year-long deal.

=== Retirement ===
On 21 February 2022, Ralte announced a shocking retirement at the age of 29 through a social media post owing to personal and family reasons.

== International career ==
Ralte has played for India at the under-16, under-19, under-23, and senior levels. He made his under-16 debut on 27 October 2007 during the 2008 AFC U-16 qualifiers against Sri Lanka in which India's under-16s won 6–0. He then scored his first goal at that level on 4 November 2007 during the qualifiers against Saudi Arabia in the 65th minute to provide India's under-16s a 3–0 win. Ralte then scored a brace for the India under-16s on 4 October 2008 against South Korea in the opening match of the 2008 AFC U-16 Championship but he could not stop India losing in the end 5–2. Ralte then made his under-19 debut on 5 November 2009 against Iraq during the 2010 AFC U-19 Qualifiers in which India's under-19s lost 5–0. Ralte then scored a brace for India's under-19s on 10 November 2009 against Oman in the U19 qualifiers in which Ralte scored in the 15th and 19th minute but could not stop India losing 4–3 in the end. Then on 23 February 2011 Ralte made his debut for the under-23 side against Myanmar in the 2012 Olympic qualifiers in which India U23s won 2–1. Ralte then scored his first goal at the under-23 level on 30 June 2012 during the 2013 AFC U-22 Asian Cup qualifiers against Turkmenistan in which Ralte scored from a 36th-minute penalty to give India U23s a 4–1 victory.

Ralte made his debut for the senior side on 10 July 2011 against Maldives in a friendly in which he came on as a sub for Syed Nabi; India drew the match 1–1. Ralte then made his tournament debut for India during the opening match of the 2011 SAFF Championship on 3 December 2011 against Afghanistan at the Nehru Stadium in Delhi; India drew 1–1 in that match.

== Career statistics ==
=== Club ===
Statistics accurate as of 25 March 2021

Club	Season	League			Federation Cup		CFL Premier A		Durand Cup		AFC		Total	
Club	Season	Division	Apps	Goals	Apps	Goals	Apps	Goals	Apps	Goals	Apps	Goals	Apps	Goals
Churchill Brothers	2009–10	I-League	4	1	0	0	—	—	0	0	5	0	9	1
Churchill Brothers	2011–12	I-League	14	6	3	0	—	—	2	1	0	0	19	7
Churchill Brothers	Total		18	7	3	0	0	0	2	1	5	0	28	8
Pailan Arrows (loan)	2010–11	I-League	7	3	0	0	—	—	0	0	0	0	7	3
East Bengal	2012–13	I-League	21	5	4	1	11	3	4	0	7	3	47	12
East Bengal	2013–14	I-League	22	4	3	0	6	2	4	1	4	1	39	8
East Bengal	2014–15	I-League	7	0	4	0	—	—	—	—	1	0	12	0
East Bengal	2015–16	I-League	2	0	2	1	—	—	—	—	0	0	4	1
East Bengal	2016–17	I-League	13	1	2	0	8	3	—	—	0	0	23	4
East Bengal	Total		65	10	15	2	25	8	8 (Note: Appearances in IFA Shield)	1	12	4	125	25
Mumbai City (loan)	2014	Indian Super League	14	1	—	—	—	—	—	—	—	—	14	1
Atlético Kolkata (loan)	2016	Indian Super League	13	1	—	—	—	—	—	—	—	—	13	1
North East United	2017-18	Indian Super League	12	0	1	0	—	—	—	—	—	—	13	0
East Bengal	2018-19	I-League	18	1	—	—	7	1	—	—	—	—	25	2
East Bengal	2019-20	I-League	9	1	0	0	8	1	3	0	0	0	20	2
East Bengal	Total		27	2	0	0	15	2	3	0	0	0	45	4
Real Kashmir	2020-21	I-League	10	1	—	—	—	—	—	—	—	—	10	1
Career total			166	25	19	2	40	10	13	2	17	4	255	43

=== National team statistics ===
Statistics accurate as of 17 March 2015

India national team
Year	Apps	Goals
2011	9	0
2012	1	0
2013	2	0
2015	2	0
Total	14	0

== Honours ==
India

- SAFF Championship: 2011
- Intercontinental Cup: 2018

Churchill Brothers

- Durand Cup: 2011

East Bengal

- I-League Runners-up: 2013–14, 2018–19
- Federation Cup: 2012
- Calcutta Football League: 2012–13, 2013–14, 2016–17
- IFA Shield: 2012

Atletico de Kolkata

- ISL: 2015
