= Gbeneme Friday =

Nigerian-Indonesian footballer

Personal information
- Date of birth: 28 January 1985 (age 41)
- Place of birth: Lagos, Nigeria
- Height: 1.80 m (5 ft 11 in)
- Position: Forward

Senior career*
Years	Team	Apps	(Gls)
2007–2009	Semen Padang	36	(14)
2009–2011	Persih Tembilahan	38	(17)
2011–2012	Mumbai	22	(12)
2012–2013	Shillong Lajong	20	(6)
2014–2015	Villa 2000	12	(8)
- * Club domestic league appearances and goals as of 04:12, 8 June 2014 (UTC)

Gbeneme Friday (born 28 January 1985) is a Nigerian former footballer who plays as a forward.

== Career ==
=== Mumbai ===
Friday signed for Mumbai F.C. from Indonesian club, Persih Tembilahan in 2011. On 14 April 2012 Friday scored four goals for Mumbai against HAL SC in an I-League game at the Bangalore Football Stadium, giving Mumbai the 5–1 victory which helped them during there fight to survive relegation to the I-League 2nd Division.

=== Shillong Lajong ===
Gbeneme signed for Shillong Lajong for the season 2012–13.

=== Villa 2000 ===
He signed for Villa 2000 on 6 April 2014.

== Career statistics ==
=== Club ===
Statistics accurate as of 19 April 2012

Club	Season	League			Cup			AFC			Total		
Club	Season	Apps	Goals	Assists	Apps	Goals	Assists	Apps	Goals	Assists	Apps	Goals	Assists
Mumbai	2011–12	20	11	0	3	0	0	—	—	—	23	11	0
Career total		20	11	0	3	0	0	0	0	0	23	11	0

== Honours ==
Shillong Lajong

- NE Super Series Championship: 2012
