= Isaac Boakye (footballer, born 1984) =

Ghanaian footballer

Personal information
- Date of birth: 21 September 1984 (age 42)
- Place of birth: Ghana
- Height: 6 ft 2 in (1.88 m)
- Position: Defender

Senior career*
| Years | Team | Apps | (Gls) |
| 2003 | Great Ambassadors | 18 | (0) |
| 2004–2008 | Real Sportive | 108 | (9) |
| 2009–2011 | New Edubiase United | 24 | (2) |
| 2011 | Chirag United Kerala | 18 | (0) |
| 2011–2015 | Young Africans | | |
- * Club domestic league appearances and goals

Isaac Boakye (born 21 September 1984) is a Ghanaian football player who played as a defender in India for Chirag United Club Kerala and in Tanzania for Young Africans.

== Career ==
Boakye featured for Young Africans S.C. in the Tanzanian Premier League in the process winning the league on three occasions.

== Honours ==
Young Africans

- Tanzanian Premier League: 2010–11, 2012–13, 2014–15
