= Dawson Fernandes =

Indian footballer

Personal information
- Date of birth: 27 July 1990 (age 36)
- Place of birth: Navelim, Goa, India
- Height: 1.67 m (5 ft 6 in)
- Position: Striker

Team information
- Current team: Salgaocar
- Number: 8

Youth career
- Fransa-Pax
- Salgaocar

Senior career*
| Years | Team | Apps | (Gls) |
| 2008–2011 | Salgaocar | 1 | (1) |
| 2011–2014 | Sporting Goa | 39 | (12) |
| 2014–2016 | Salgaocar | 0 | (0) |
| 2021– | Goan United | 0 | (0) |

International career
| 2013 | India | 3 | (0) |
- * Club domestic league appearances and goals as of 12:44, 9 April 2015 (UTC)

Dawson Fernandez (born 27 July 1990 in Navelim, Goa) is an Indian professional footballer who plays as a striker. He last played in India for Salgacar in the I-League, and currently plays for Goan United FC in the Middlesex County Football League.

== Career ==
=== Early career ===
Dawson would play for his school team and gradually went on to play for Goa U-16 in the Subroto Cup. It was then that he realised that he could continue to play football at the highest level. During his schooling days, his parents had no clue about his playing football, as he knew that they would never encourage him to continue. It was only when he wanted to play for the state team and next for Fransa-Pax FC that his parents became aware of it. To his fortune, they let him play for the state team.

Then he represented Salgaocar youth team through various championships, eventually representing his state at the U-19 national championship and was captain for the U-21 Goa side for the final of Dutta Trophy in 2009–10, which his team won thanks to a solitary goal from him, defeating hosts Haryana. He also went to Portugal for training with Primeira Liga club Vitória de Guimarães.

=== Sporting Goa ===
After spending 3 seasons at Salgaocar in the I-League, Fernandes signed for Sporting Goa also in the I-League. He made his debut for the club on 22 December 2011 against Dempo and he also scored in the match as Sporting lost 2–3. He then scored his second goal for the club on 1 February 2012 against Pune in the 91st minute in a match that ended with Sporting winning 4–2. In the next game against Chirag United Fernandes scored a double as Sporting came out 3–0 winners. He then scored another double in the last game of the season against HAL on 5 May 2012.

=== Salgaocar ===
On 31 May, Fernandes rejoined Salgaocar signing a one-year deal after an impressive season with Sporting.

== International career ==
On 5 August 2013, Dawson received his first call for India for an International friendly match against Tajikistan on 14 August 2013. He made three appearances for his country.

== Career statistics ==
=== Club ===
As of 9 April 2015

| Club | Season | League | | Federation Cup | | Duran Cup | | AFC | | Total | |
| Club | Season | Apps | Goals | Apps | Goals | Apps | Goals | Apps | Goals | Apps | Goals |
|---|---|---|---|---|---|---|---|---|---|---|---|
| Salgaocar | 2010–11 | 1 | 1 | 0 | 0 | — | — | — | — | 1 | 1 |
| Sporting Goa | 2011–12 | 11 | 6 | 0 | 0 | — | — | — | — | 11 | 6 |
| Sporting Goa | 2012–13 | 20 | 5 | 3 | 3 | 0 | 0 | — | — | 23 | 8 |
| Sporting Goa | 2013–14 | 8 | 1 | 0 | 0 | — | — | — | — | 8 | 1 |
| Salgaocar | 2014–15 | 0 | 0 | 0 | 0 | 0 | 0 | — | — | 0 | 0 |
| Career total | | 40 | 13 | 3 | 3 | 0 | 0 | 0 | 0 | 43 | 16 |

== Honours ==
India

- SAFF Championship runner-up: 2013

== See also ==
- Goans in football
- List of Indian football players in foreign leagues
