= Prayag Film City =

- Prayag Film City logo

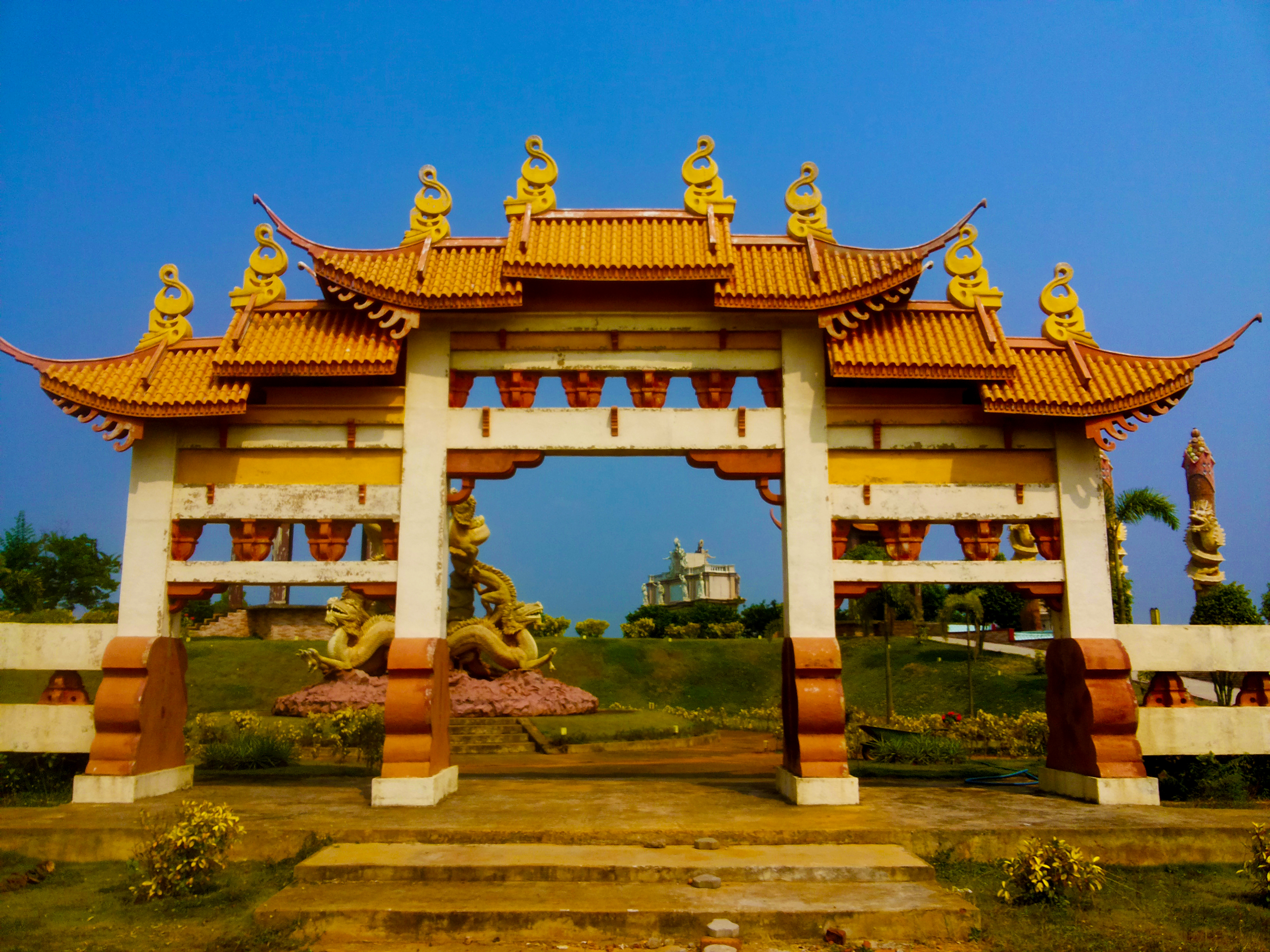
- Monument at Prayag Film City
- Address: India
- Location: Chandrakona, West Midnapore, West Bengal

Construction
- Opened: 5 April 2012
- Closed: August 2024
- Cost: ₹1,000 Crores
- Builder: Prayag Group

Website
- prayagfilmcity.net

The Prayag Film City, also known as Midnapore Film City, Chandrakona Film City, or Bengal Film City, is an abandoned film studio complex, located at Chandrakona, West Midnapore, 165 km from Kolkata.

Built by the Prayag Group, it is the second-largest film city and costing ₹10 billion (US$100 million). The complex was planned to cover 2,700 acres at an estimated cost of ₹1,000 crore (US$120 million).

Designed by Bollywood art director Nitish Roy, the project was proposed to be completed in two phases

== History ==
This is the first of its kind film-making arena in Asia. The complex's first phase, designed by the noted art director Nitish Roy, is opened to public from 15 April 2012. The official brand ambassador of the film city complex is Bollywood star Shahrukh Khan, who is also West Bengal's tourism brand ambassador.

== Incidents ==
A part of the location burned down in a large fire in March 2019.

== See also ==
- Cinema of India
- Film and Television Institute of India
- State Institute of Film and Television
- Satyajit Ray Film and Television Institute
