= Creson Antao =

Indian footballer

Personal information
- Full name: Creson Joscyl Antao
- Date of birth: 22 December 1983 (age 42)
- Place of birth: Majorda, Goa, India
- Height: 1.83 m (6 ft 0 in)
- Position: Defender

Team information
- Current team: Sporting Clube de Goa
- Number: 12

Senior career*
Years	Team	Apps	(Gls)
2004–2006	Fransa-Pax		
2006–2014	Dempo		
2014–	Sporting Goa	6	(0)
- * Club domestic league appearances and goals as of 30 May 2015

Creson Antao (born 22 December 1983) is an Indian footballer who plays as a defender for Sporting Clube de Goa in the I-League.

== Career ==
The Majorda-based footballer, who first started as a volleyball player only to be spotted later by coach Shabbir Ali to join Fransa-Pax FC, had a good stint with his former club for two seasons where he served as the captain, before he switched allegiance to Dempo S.C. Armando Colaco who spotted the potential in Creson in his early 20s only to be drafted into the senior team.

The 2011–12 season was the best for Creson, who not only stepped up his performance as a defender but earned the respect of his seniors and coach Armando as possibly the future face of Dempo defence.

Creson, who retired 2010–11 season with a knee injury, came back strongly in the new season and practically featured in every game Dempo played. He was not only a consistent performer in the back line but also lifted his game to a new level.

Creson used to wear the Jersey No 4 for Dempo S.C.

=== Sporting Goa ===
On 27 June 2014 it was announced that Antao has signed for Sporting Clube de Goa on a two-year contract.
