= Peter Carvalho =

Indian footballer (born 1980)

Personal information
- Full name: Peter Carvalho
- Date of birth: 18 December 1980 (age 45)
- Place of birth: Quepem, Goa, India
- Height: 1.77 m (5 ft 9 1/2 in)
- Position: Defensive midfielder

Senior career*
Years	Team	Apps	(Gls)
2004–2016	Dempo	349	(14)
2014	→ FC Goa (loan)	8	(0)
2015	→ Kerala Blasters (loan)	2	(0)
2016–2017	FC Bardez Goa		
2017–2018	Sporting Goa		

International career^{‡}
2011	India	2	(0)
- * Club domestic league appearances and goals ‡ National team caps and goals as of 08:05, 12 April 2015 (UTC)

Peter Carvalho (born 18 December 1980) is an Indian football player who plays as a defensive midfielder.

== Club career ==
In July 2015 Carvalho was drafted to play for Kerala Blasters FC in the 2015 Indian Super League.

== International ==
On 10 July 2011 Carvalho played his first match for India against Maldives coming off the bench.
