= Joaquim Abranches =

Indian professional football player

Personal information
- Full name: Joaquim Santan Abranches
- Date of birth: 28 October 1985 (age 41)
- Place of birth: Verna, Goa, India
- Height: 1.73 m (5 ft 8 in)
- Positions: Forward; winger

Youth career
- 2003–2004: Salcete FC
- 2004-2005: Churchill Brothers
- 2005–2007: Dempo

Senior career*
Years	Team	Apps	(Gls)
2007–2013	Dempo	194	(46)
2013–2016	East Bengal	76	(25)
2014-2015	→ FC Pune City (loan)	28	(4)
2015-2017	→ FC Goa (loan)	46	(12)
2016–2019	Dempo	74	(22)

International career
2010-2011	India U23	8	(2)
2011–2014	India	12	(2)
- * Club domestic league appearances and goals

Joaquim Abranches (born 28 October 1985) is an Indian professional football player who last played as a winger for Dempo S.C. in the Goa Professional League.

== Club career ==
=== Dempo ===
Hailing from Verna, Goa, Abranches was only 19 years old when he signed for Dempo S.C. For the next three years he was used in the Goa Professional League where he made a name for himself scoring some vital goals. He was one of Dempo's top scorers in the Goa League and also helped Dempo to two Goa League crowns during that period. The exposure he gained playing in the Goa League helped him develop as a player.

His first big break came in the 2009–10 I-League season, the year Dempo became the national champions for a record equaling fourth time. That year saw India's top marksman, Sunil Chhetri, donning colours for Dempo and initially Abranches had to settle for a place on the bench. But mid-way into the season, a tempting offer from Sporting Kansas City Wizards, a team from Major League Soccer, saw Sunil Chhetri suddenly annul his contract and pack his bags for USA. Left with little options, Armando Colaco started including Abranches in the first eleven on a regular basis. He scored a stunning seven goals that year, deservedly earning a call up to the India U-23 team as well.

=== East Bengal ===
In 2013, Joaquim joined the Kolkata-based East Bengal. His first competitive match was against Kalighat M.S. in the Calcutta Premier Division 2013, where he scored the 3rd goal for his side from a forward through pass of the Goan veteran Alvito D'Cunha. His first appearance in the I-league for East Bengal came against Shillong Lajong on 9 October 2013 as a substitute for Cavin Lobo.

== International ==
Abranches made his debut for India on 21 March 2011 against Chinese Taipei coming on in the 70th minute for N.S.Manju. Abranches scored his first goal for India against Oman on 23 February 2012.

=== International statistics ===
As of 15 April 2015

India national team
Year	Apps	Goals
2010	2	0
2011	5	0
2012	4	1
Total	11	1

=== International Goals ===
Goal	Date	Venue	Opponent	Score	Result	Competition
1	23 February 2012	Sultan Qaboos Sports Complex, Muscat	Oman	1–3	1–5	Friendly

== Honours ==
India

- SAFF Championship: 2011

India U23

- SAFF Championship: 2009

Goa

- Santosh Trophy: 2005–06

Dempo

- AWES Cup: 2017
