= Manandeep Singh =

Indian footballer (born 1992)

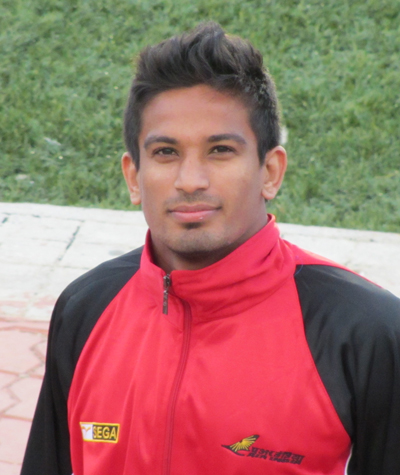

Personal information
- Date of birth: 3 November 1992 (age 34)
- Place of birth: Hisar, Haryana, India
- Height: 1.80 m (5 ft 11 in)
- Position: Striker

Team information
- Current team: Minerva Punjab
- Number: 11

Senior career*
Years	Team	Apps	(Gls)
2010–2011	Pailan Arrows	14	(2)
2011–2012	Air India	18	(9)
2012–2013	East Bengal	20	(3)
2013–2014	Rangdajied United	6	(2)
2014	Delhi Dynamos	2	(0)
2015	Kerala Blasters	2	(0)
2016	Salgaocar	7	(0)
2017	Minerva Punjab	10	(0)
2017–2018	Mohun Bagan	3	(1)
2018–	Minerva Punjab	1	(0)

International career^{‡}
2007–2008	India U16	5	(3)
2009	India U19	4	(0)
2011	India U23	5	(1)
2012–	India	2	(0)
- * Club domestic league appearances and goals as of 17:44, 25 December 2016 (UTC) ‡ National team caps and goals as of 18:38, 20 March 2015 (UTC)

Manandeep Singh (born 3 November 1992, in Hisar, Haryana) is an ex Indian football team player turned model and actor. He played as a striker for Minerva Punjab in the I-League.

== Career ==
=== Pailan Arrows and Air India ===
Singh started his professional career in 2010 with Pailan Arrows (then known as Indian Arrows) of the I-League. While with Arrows Singh scored only one goal which came against Air India on 13 March 2011 in which Singh scored the equaliser for Arrows in a match that Arrows eventually won 5–2. Singh then left Pailan Arrows after one season and signed for Air India for the 2011–12 I-League season. Singh scored his first two goals for Air India on 1 November 2011 when he scored a brace against Salgaocar in the I-League in a match that Air India won 3–1. Singh then scored again in his next match for Air India against Chirag United Kerala on 6 November 2011 when he scored from a penalty in the 45th minute as Air India won 2–1. Singh continued his good form for Air India by scoring another brace against HAL on 20 November 2011 which helped Air India clinch a 4–2 victory. Singh then ended 2011 by scoring another brace against eventual champions Dempo on 18 December 2011 in which Air India won 2–0 and in which was surprising after Air India lost 14–0 to Dempo the season before. At the end of 2011 Singh had scored nine goals. Singh did not score again for Air India till 26 March 2012 in which he scored a brace against Mohun Bagan. After the season ended Singh was named the Football Players Association of India Young Player of the Season for the 2012–13 season.

=== East Bengal ===
After the season ended Manandeep signed for East Bengal. He made his first-team debut for the club on 21 September 2012 against Sporting Goa in East Bengal's first match of the 2012 Federation Cup by coming on as a 59th-minute substitute for Baljit Sahni. Then two days later Singh scored his first goal for East Bengal against ONGC after converting an 80th-minute penalty which won East Bengal the game 2–1. Singh then scored a brace for East Bengal on 25 September 2012 against Kalighat MS to send East Bengal to the semi-finals of the Federation Cup. East Bengal won the match 4–3. Singh then scored for East Bengal in the Final of the 2012 Federation Cup on 30 September 2012 scoring in the 100th minute to give East Bengal a 2–1; eventually East Bengal won the game and the tournament 3–2.

Manandeep scored his first goal for East Bengal in league competition on 17 November 2012 against Churchill Brothers at the Fatorda Stadium in Margao, Goa in which he scored the second goal for East Bengal in a 3–0 victory which also sent East Bengal into first place in the I-League at that point. Singh then scored his second goal for the club in league play on 24 November 2012 against ONGC at the Salt Lake Stadium in which East Bengal won 5–0 convincingly.

=== Rangdajied United ===
On 20 November 2013, despite earlier rejecting ISL signed players, Rangdajied United of the I-League agreed to sign Manandeep on as well as Subrata Pal, Sandesh Jhingan, Gouramangi Singh, and Tomba Singh.

He made his debut in I-League on 22 November 2013 against Shillong Lajong at the Nehru Stadium as he played the whole match and earned a yellow card in the 84th minute as Rangdajied drew the match 1–1.

=== Delhi Dynamos ===
Manandeep signed for Indian Super League club Delhi Dynamos for the 2014 season, appearing twice.

=== Kerala Blasters ===
Manandeep spend 3 weeks at Norwegian club Strømmen who play in the Norwegian First Division, the second-tier football league in Norway, using the trial as a recovery stint from an injury he suffered during the 2014 ISL season, which forced him to miss any prospective football during the ISL off-season. He was picked up by Kerala Blasters for the 2015 ISL.

== International ==
=== Youth ===
Singh has played for India at the U16, U19, and U23 youth levels. He made his debut for the under-16 side on 27 October 2007 against Sri Lanka under-16s during the 2008 AFC U-16 qualifiers in which he also scored in the 46th minute as India U16s went on to win 6–0. He then scored his second goal for the u16 side on 1 November 2007 against Lebanon in the 47th minute as India secured a 3–0. Singh then scored his third goal for the under-16s on 8 October 2008 during the 2008 AFC U-16 Championship against Indonesia; India won 1–0. Singh then made his debut for the u19 team on 5 November 2009 against Iraq during the 2010 AFC U-19 Championship qualifiers; India U19 lost 5–0. He then made his under-23 debut for India on 23 June 2011 against Qatar U23 coming on as a 69th minute substitution for Chinadorai Sabeeth; India U23 drew the match 1–1 but lost 4–2 on aggregate.

=== Seniors ===
Singh made his debut for the India seniors on 23 February 2012 against Oman in a friendly coming on as a 77th-minute substitute for Sushil Kumar Singh; India lost 2–1.

== Career statistics ==
=== Club ===
Statistics accurate as of 27 September 2015

Club	Season	League			Federation Cup		Durand Cup		AFC		Total	
Club	Season	Division	Apps	Goals	Apps	Goals	Apps	Goals	Apps	Goals	Apps	Goals
Pailan Arrows	2010–11	I-League	14	2	0	0	0	0	—	—	14	2
Air India	2011–12	I-League	18	9	0	0	0	0	—	—	18	9
East Bengal	2012–13	I-League	20	3	5	4	0	0	3	0	28	7
Rangdajied United	2013–14	I-League	6	2	0	0	0	0	—	—	6	2
Delhi Dynamos	2014	ISL	2	0	—	—	—	—	—	—	2	0
Kerala Blasters	2015	ISL	0	0	—	—	—	—	—	—	0	0
Career total			60	16	5	4	0	0	3	0	68	20

== Honours ==
East Bengal

- Federation Cup: 2012

India

- Nehru Cup: 2012

Individual

- FPAI Young Player of the Year: 2012
