= Mahesh Gawli =

Indian footballer

Personal information
- Date of birth: 23 January 1980 (age 46)
- Place of birth: Panaji, Goa, India
- Height: 1.78 m (5 ft 10 in)
- Position: Centre back

Senior career*
Years	Team	Apps	(Gls)
1998–1999	FC Kochin	32	(4)
2000–2003	Churchill Brothers	78	(8)
2003–2005	East Bengal	38	(2)
2005–2007	Mahindra United	72	(6)
2007–2015	Dempo	265	(18)

International career
1998–2002	India U23	24	(4)
2000–2012	India	78	(12)

Managerial career
- 2018−2022: Indian Arrows (assistant)
- 2020−2022: India U20
- 2022−: India (assistant)
- 2026−: India U20
- * Club domestic league appearances and goals

Mahesh Gawli (born 23 January 1980) is an Indian football coach and former footballer who played as a centre-back. He serves as the head coach of the India national U20 team. He represented the India national football team between 2000 and 2011.

== Club career ==
Gawli was born in Goa and began playing football at 8. Gawli's talent was immediately spotted by the coaches at all age groups. He was a member of the Goa U-12 team that lost against Japan U-12 in 1991–92. He then joined the famed Tata Football Academy.

Gawli started his career at FC Kochin where he joined in 1998 after graduating from Tata Football Academy and won the Kerala League with them before moving on to Churchill Brothers.

He stayed there at Churchill for three consecutive seasons from 2000 to 2002 and won the Goa Professional League thrice with them. He also helped them secure the Runners-up medals in the 2001–02 season of National Football League (India) before moving on to Kolkata biggies East Bengal.

Gawli first tasted the National League success in 2003–04 season after moving into the East Bengal. He was also a member of the East Bengal team that won the prestigious 2003 ASEAN Club Championship in which he also scored a goal against Philippine Army F.C. East Bengal completed a treble that season by winning the Kolkata League crown.

After a successful three-year stint with the East Bengal, it was time for Mahesh to find his place in Mahindra United team. It was under Mahindra Coach David Booth that Gawli displayed his finest brand of football. He helped Mahindra win the NFL, Indian Federation Cup, Mumbai Football League and the IFA Shield and was part of the team that participated in the 2007 AFC Cup and went on to reach the last eight stage. Gawli won the best defender award in the 10th NFL for his stellar performances in Mahindra United colors.

Mahesh moved from Mahindra to Dempo in 2007 and has become a pillar of strength in Dempo's defense. Gawli has won two I-League titles with Dempo and is a regular starter for the club and forms a formidable partnership with another India international Samir Naik. He helped Dempo reach the semi-finals of 2008 AFC Cup and the pre-quarters in 2011 AFC Cup.

== International career ==
He represented India in the AFC U-16 Championship in 1996 held in Thailand and was included in the Asian All Star U-16 team. Gawli soon made his international debut in the pre-Olympic qualifier against Thailand in 1999 and cemented his place in the Indian team.

Mahesh has been representing India since 2001. With India, he won the LG Cup and several SAFF Cups. He was part of the historical Nehru Cup 2007 win in which he was the man of the match in the final against Syria. He was also an important part of the victorious India team at the 2008 AFC Challenge Cup.

He announced his retirement on 26 December 2011, almost 2 weeks after winning the 2011 SAFF Championship with India.

== International statistics ==
As of 2011

India national team
Year	Apps	Goals
1999	1	0
2000	4	0
2001	8	0
2002	2	0
2003	3	0
2004	6	0
2005	8	1
2006	2	0
2007	7	0
2008	8	0
2009	12	0
2010	7	0
2011	10	0
Total	78	1

=== International goals ===
Goal	Date	Venue	Opponent	Score	Result	Competition
1	10 December 2005	Karachi, Pakistan	Bhutan	2–0	3–0	2005 SAFF Cup

== Honours ==
East Bengal

- National Football League: 2003–04
- ASEAN Club Championship: 2003

Mahindra United

- National Football League: 2005
- Federation Cup: 2005
- IFA Shield: 2006

Dempo

- I-League: 2007-08 I-League, 2009-10 I-League, 2011-12 I-League
- Super Cup: 2008

India

- AFC Challenge Cup: 2008
- SAFF Cup: 2005, 2011; runner-up: 2008
- Nehru Cup: 2007, 2009
- South Asian Games Bronze medal: 1999
- Afro-Asian Games silver medal: 2003

India U23

- LG Cup: 2002

Individual

- Best defender of the I-league: 2004–05, 2005–06, 2006–07, 2007–08, 2011–12
- 2007 ONGC Nehru Cup Final: Man of the Match
- Dilip Sardesai Sports Excellence Award: 2008
