= Koko Sakibo =

Nigerian footballer

Personal information
- Full name: Koko Sakibo
- Date of birth: 10 December 1987 (age 38)
- Place of birth: Lagos, Nigeria
- Height: 1.86 m (6 ft 1 in)
- Position: Forward

Senior career*
| Years | Team | Apps | (Gls) |
| 2009–2011 | Vasco | | |
| 2011–2013 | Dempo | 40 | (13) |
| 2013–2016 | Eagles | | |
| 2017 | FC Bardez | 10 | (4) |
- * Club domestic league appearances and goals

Koko Sakibo (born 10 December 1987) is a Nigerian former professional footballer who played as a striker.

== Career ==
Koko Sakibo started his football career back in Nigeria with local teams before moving to Egypt. There he spent three months with a second division club and returned to Nigeria.

Sakibo's move to India was due to the recommendation of Pune FC defender Chika Wali. Both Sakibo and Wali played together in their home country. After being unsuccessful with his trials at Pune F.C., Sakibo eventually landed at Vasco S.C. after impressing the Goan club.

Sakibo scored six goals in seven matches in the final round of the second division, as well another 12 in the Goa Professional League.

Dempo S.C. had captured the 2011–12 I-League crown with Koko Sakibo scoring 7 goals.
