= Climax Lawrence =

Indian footballer

Personal information
- Full name: Climax Lourenco Lawrence
- Date of birth: 16 January 1979 (age 47)
- Place of birth: Margao, Goa, India
- Height: 1.78 m (5 ft 10 in)
- Position: Midfielder

Youth career
- 1998–1999: Vasco

Senior career*
Years	Team	Apps	(Gls)
1999–2004	Salgaocar	59	(11)
2004–2005	East Bengal	21	(7)
2005–2013	Dempo	38	(4)
2013–2015	Mumbai	30	(2)
2014	Atlético de Kolkata	0	(0)
2015–2016	Laxmi Prasad SC		
2016–2017	FC Bardez		

International career^{‡}
2006	India U23		
2003–2011	India	72	(3)
- * Club domestic league appearances and goals as of 30 May 2015 ‡ National team caps and goals as of 11 December 2011

Climax Lourenco Lawrence (born 16 January 1979) is a retired Indian professional football midfielder. He last played for FC Bardez in the Goa Professional League in 2017.

== National team ==
In 2002, he was called to the India national football team by coach Stephen Constantine and has since been a part. In the AFC Challenge Cup, he scored the winning goal in the 91st minute against Afghanistan to help India to a 1–0 victory. He retired from national team on 1 February 2012.

=== International statistics ===
As of 2011

India national team
Year	Apps	Goals
2003	7	0
2004	8	1
2005	8	1
2007	7	0
2008	12	1
2009	6	0
2010	9	0
2011	15	0
Total	72	3

=== International Goals ===
Goal	Date	Venue	Opponent	Score	Result	Competition
1	24 August 2004	Ho Chi Minh City, Vietnam	Vietnam	2–1	2–1	Friendly
2	12 December 2005	Karachi, Pakistan	Bangladesh	1–0	1–1	2005 SAFF Cup
3	30 July 2008	Gachibowli Athletic Stadium, Hyderabad, India	Afghanistan	1–0	1–0	2008 AFC Challenge Cup

== As member of AIFF ==
On 2 September 2022, Lawrence was elected as a co-opted member of the technical committee of the All India Football Federation.

== Managerial career ==
Lawrence became assistant manager of Goan club Sporting CG in 2023, helped the team winning inaugural edition of the I-League 3, and securing promotion to I-League 2.

== Honours ==
India

- AFC Challenge Cup: 2008
- SAFF Championship: 2005, 2011; runner-up: 2008; third place: 2003
- Nehru Cup: 2007, 2009
- Afro-Asian Games silver medal: 2003

Individual

- AIFF Player of the Year: 2005
