= Johnny Menyongar =

Liberian footballer (born 1980)

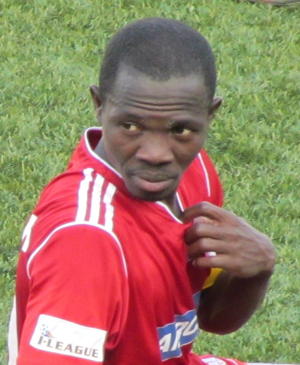
- Menyongar with Shillong Lajong in 2012

Personal information
- Date of birth: 26 June 1980 (age 46)
- Place of birth: Monrovia, Liberia
- Height: 5 ft 5 in (1.65 m)
- Position: Midfielder

Youth career
- 1998: Lindsey Wilson Blue Raiders

Senior career*
Years	Team	Apps	(Gls)
2000–2005	Minnesota Thunder	188	(56)
2006–2009	Rochester Rhinos	106	(28)
2010	NSC Minnesota Stars	20	(1)
2011	United Sikkim	13	(13)
2011–2013	Shillong Lajong	15	(4)
2013	→ Dempo (loan)	8	(1)
2013–2014	Bengaluru FC	23	(3)

International career
2000–2006	Liberia	25	(5)
- * Club domestic league appearances and goals

Johnny Menyongar (born 26 June 1980) is a Liberian former professional footballer who played as a midfielder.

== Club career ==
=== College ===
Menyongar came to the United States from his native Liberia in 1998 and played college soccer at NAIA Lindsey Wilson College, leading the team to the NAIA Division III national championship.

=== United States ===
Menyongar signed his first professional contract in 2000 with Minnesota Thunder after impressing at a tryout camp. Menyongar spent the first six seasons of his professional career with Minnesota, totaling 50 regular-season goals in addition to many playoff and Lamar Hunt U.S. Open Cup tallies. He helped the Thunder to the 2003 A-League championship game and scored five goals as Minnesota reached the semifinals of the 2005 Lamar Hunt U.S. Open Cup.

In November 2005, Menyongar signed with the Rochester Raging Rhinos, where he was chosen as team MVP in 2008 and 2009. Prior to the 2010 season, he became the first signing for the new club NSC Minnesota Stars.

=== India ===
In February 2011, Menyongar was recruited by Baichung Bhutia to play for United Sikkim FC in their inaugural professional season and in the 2011 I-League 2nd Division, in which he scored 13 goals in 13 games. In June 2011, he announced that he would move to Shillong Lajong F.C. in the I-League.

Then on 3 January 2013 it was officially announced that Menyongar had signed for reigning I-League champions Dempo S.C. for the rest of the season. He made his debut for the club against United Sikkim F.C. on 19 January 2013 at home in which Dempo won 7–0.

==== Bengaluru FC ====
On 13 July 2013 it was confirmed that Menyongar had signed for new direct-entry I-League side Bengaluru FC for the 2013–14 season. He made his debut for the team in the team's first official match against Mohun Bagan in the I-League on 22 September 2013 at the Bangalore Football Stadium. He played the full match as Bengaluru FC drew the game 1–1. He then scored his first goal for the club on 26 November 2013 against Salgaocar at the Duler Stadium in which his 21st-minute strike set Bengaluru FC up for a 2–1 victory – their first away victory in team history.

Soon after he scored his second goal of the season on 11 December 2013 in the I-League against Mohammedan in which his 21st-minute strike gave Bengaluru FC the early 1–0 lead which would eventually turn into a 3–2 victory.

Menyongar went on to win the I-League in Bengaluru FC's first season in the league, however, after the season ended he was released by the team. He started in 23 of the side's 24 matches that season.

On 27 July 2015, he announced his retirement from competitive football.

== International career ==
Menyongar made his international debut with Liberia in 1995. Menyongar has played in two qualifying matches for the 2002 FIFA World Cup, and played in two matches at the 2002 African Nations Cup. Menyongar played four matches during the team's qualifying campaign for the 2006 FIFA World Cup, but the team lost 0–2 against Senegal. He also captained the team from 2004 to 2006. On official Liberian rosters, he is listed as John Menyongai.

== Honors ==
Minnesota Thunder

- USL A-League runner-up: 2000, 2003

Shillong Lajong

- I-League 2nd Division: 2011

Bengaluru

- I-League: 2013–14
