= James Gbilee =

Liberian footballer

Personal information
- Full name: James Gbilee
- Date of birth: 2 May 1983 (age 43)
- Place of birth: Liberia
- Height: 1.76 m (5 ft 9 in)
- Position: Forward

Team information
- Current team: Kalighat MS

Youth career
- 1998–2007: Devereux Football Club

Senior career*
Years	Team	Apps	(Gls)
2008–2012	Shillong Lajong	70	(12)
2012	Kalighat MS	2	(1)
- * Club domestic league appearances and goals

James Gbilee (born 2 May 1983) is a Liberian former footballer. He played for, among others, Kalighat Milan Sangha in the I-League 2nd Division in India.

== Positions ==
He can also play as a midfielder or striker.

== Honors ==
Shillong Lajong

- I-League 2nd Division: 2011, third place 2009
- Federation Cup: runner-up 2009–10
- Meghalaya Invitation Cup: 2010, 2011
