= 2012–13 Pune FC season =

Indian football club season

Pune
2012–13 season
- Chairman: Chirag Tanna
- Manager: Derrick Pereira
- Ground: Balewadi Sports Complex
- I-League: 2nd
- Federation Cup: Group
- Top goalscorer: League: All: James Moga
Home colours	Away colours

The 2012–13 Pune F.C. season is the club's 5th and 6th year of existence as well as its 4th season in I-League, the top-flight of Indian football.

Pune F.C. finished 2nd in the I-League, which is their best performance in the league.

After a good 2011–12 season in which the club finished 5th, Pune looked to bounce back to their 2009–10 form which saw them finish in 3rd place.

== Overview ==
=== Pre-season ===
Transfers

The 2011–12 I-League season ended on 6 May 2012 for Pune but the business end of the 2012–13 season began three days later on 9 May with the announced departures of club captain and #1 goalkeeper for club and country Subrata Pal as well as central midfielder Baldeep Singh both to fellow I-League club Prayag United. It was then announced on 27 May 2012 that midfielder Paresh Shivalkar left the club and signed for newly formed Dodsal Football Club who would begin play in the Mumbai Football League.

Then on 5 June 2012 it was revealed that Pune top scorer for the last 2 seasons, Mandjou Keita, would be leaving the club to join reigning Malaysia Super League champions, Kelantan FA, on a free transfer. The Pune departures did not stop however as only three days later on 8 June 2012 it was officially announced that the 21-year-old defender, Rollingson Hungyo, would be one of the first official signings of the season for Shillong Lajong.

Then on 11 June 2012 it was officially announced that Pune had sold Indian international midfielder Lester Fernandez to Prayag United for ₹20 lakh in what is a notable event in Indian football history as this was the first ever transfer which involved money being given for a player instead of the usual free transfers.

Pune then made their first two signings of the season on 23 June 2012 with the signing of India international defender Nallappan Mohanraj and the even bigger signing of South Sudan international striker James Moga who scored 15 goals in the I-League in 2011–12 for Sporting Clube de Goa. Pune went on to make two more signings afterwards with the signings of Vellington Rocha and Mumtaz Akhtar from Margao FC and United Sikkim respectively. The club then signed the on-loan keeper from last season, Abhra Mondal, on a permanent deal from East Bengal on 11 July 2012.

The club then dipped into the 2012 I-League U20 championship winning academy squad by signing U20 captain Suji Kumar and Kamardeep Singh to professional contracts on 15 July 2012. The club then made their defense stronger on 30 July 2012 after they signed Zohmingliana Ralte from Shillong Lajong

Pre-season schedule and friendlies

Pune began pre-season training with the full squad on 16 July 2012. Seven of the players however began training with the club a week earlier due to injuries they had towards the end of last season. Those players were Amrinder Singh, John Benedick, Maninder Singh, Asim Hassan, Jeh Williamson, Kamardeep Singh, and Sukhwinder Singh. Two of the 26-member squad did not join the club till early August. They were midfielder Pierre Djidjia Douhou and South Sudan international James Moga. However defender Anas Edathodika, who is sidelined with malaria, is not decided how long he is out for.

For the first-week of training the club focused on non-ball exercises and fitness. The team was coached that week and supervised under fitness coaches Elton Menezes and Sridhar K. The second week still focused on fitness but added the ball as well for three sessions. On 3 August 2012 it was announced that the club would spend time in Goa in August and focus on technical and tactical aspects of the game and also play in a few friendlies.

The club played their first pre-season match against DSK Shivajians in Pune. Pune FC drew the match 2–2 with Singam Subhash Singh and Chika Wali scoring. The next game Pune took on the Pune F.C. Academy in which Pune FC won 2–1 with Subhash Singh scoring 2 goals. Pune and Subhash continued their good form against Deccan XI in which Pune won 3–0 with goals from Subhash (his fourth in pre-season), Jeh Williamson and an Asian trialist.

== Players and Staff ==
=== First-team squad ===
As of 12 May 2013.

Note: Flags indicate national team as defined under FIFA eligibility rules; some limited exceptions apply. Players may hold more than one non-FIFA nationality.

No.	Pos.	Nation	Player
1	GK	IND	Abhra Mondal
21	GK	IND	Shahin Lal Meloly
30	GK	IND	Amrinder Singh
2	DF	IND	Othallo Tabia
3	DF	IND	Caitano Costa
4	DF	NGR	Chika Wali (captain)
5	DF	IND	Gurjinder Kumar
13	DF	IND	Zohmingliana Ralte
15	DF	IND	Anas Edathodika
25	DF	IND	Srikanth Ramu
27	DF	IND	Nallappan Mohanraj
6	MF	IND	Shanmugam Venkatesh
8	MF	IND	Arata Izumi
11	MF	CIV	Pierre Douhou

No.	Pos.	Nation	Player
14	MF	IND	Karma Tsewang
16	MF	IND	Velington Rocha
17	MF	IND	Sukhwinder Singh
18	MF	IND	Asim Hassan
20	MF	IND	Nikhil Kadam
22	MF	IND	Khanthang Paite (on loan from East Bengal)
23	MF	IND	Mumtaz Akhtar
26	MF	IND	Fanai Lalrempuia
32	MF	IND	David Lalbiakzara
9	FW	SSD	James Moga
10	FW	IND	Jeje Lalpekhlua
12	FW	IND	Singam Subhash Singh
29	FW	AUS	Boima Karpeh

=== Coaching staff ===
12 May 2013

Position	Name
Manager	Derrick Pereira
Assistant manager	Norbert Gonsalves
Fitness Coach	Elton Menezes
Youth team coach	Gift Raikhan
Physiotherapist	Tariq Wasim Shaikh
Head of youth development	Rajan Chowdhury

== Transfers ==
=== In ===
#	Position	Player	Transferred from	Date	Source
27	DF	(India) Nallappan Mohanraj	(India) Mohun Bagan	23 June 2012	
9	FW	(South Sudan) James Moga	(India) Sporting Goa	23 July 2012	
16	MF	(India) Velington Rocha	(India) Margao	27 June 2012	
23	MF	(India) Mumtaz Akhtar	(India) United Sikkim	8 July 2012	
1	GK	(India) Abhra Mondal	(India) East Bengal	11 July 2012	
13	DF	(India) Zohmingliana Ralte	(India) Shillong Lajong	30 July 2012	
22	MF	(India) Khanthang Paite	(India) on loan from East Bengal	September 2012	
29	FW	(Australia) Boima Karpeh	(Indonesia) Persiram Raja Ampat	16 February 2013	

=== Out ===
Position	Player	Transferred to	Fee	Date	Source
MF	(India) Dhanpal Ganeshan	(India) Pailan Arrows	out on loan Pailan Arrows	July 2012	
GK	(India) Subrata Pal	(India) Prayag United	Free	9 May 2012	
MF	(India) Baldeep Singh	(India) Prayag United	Free	9 May 2012	
MF	(India) Paresh Shivalkar	(India) Mumbai Tigers	Free	27 May 2012	
FW	(Guinea) Mandjou Keita	(Malaysia) Kelantan FA	Free	5 June 2012	
DF	(India) Rollingson Hungyo	(India) Shillong Lajong	Free	8 June 2012	
MF	(India) Lester Fernandez	(India) Prayag United	₹20 lakh	11 June 2012	
DF	(India) Kamaljeet Kumar	(India) Mumbai	Free	10 July 2012	
MF	(Japan) Daisuke Nishiguchi	(India) DSK Shivajians F.C.	Free	16 February 2013	

=== Academy Sign-ups ===
#	Position	Player	Age Group	Date	Source
20	MF	(India) Nikhil Kadam	U20	20 August 2012	
26	MF	(India) Fanai Lalrempuia	U20	April 2013	
32	MF	(India) David Lalbiakzara	U20	2013	

== Appearances and goals ==
As of 12 May 2013 SEASON 12–13

No.	Pos	Nat	Player	Total		I-League		Federation Cup		Durand Cup	
No.	Pos	Nat	Player	Apps	Goals	Apps	Goals	Apps	Goals	Apps	Goals
1	GK	(India) IND	Abhra Mondal	13	0	13	0	0	0	0	0
21	GK	(India) IND	Shahin Lal Meloly	9	0	9	0	0	0	0	0
30	GK	(India) IND	Amrinder Singh	7	0	5	0	2	0	0	0
2	DF	(India) IND	Othallo Tabia	19	1	19	1	0	0	0	0
3	DF	(India) IND	Caitano Costa	10	0	8	0	2	0	0	0
4	DF	(Nigeria) NGR	Chika Wali	25	1	23	1	2	0	0	0
5	DF	(India) IND	Gurjinder Kumar	25	0	23	0	2	0	0	0
13	DF	(India) IND	Zohmingliana Ralte	4	0	4	0	0	0	0	0
15	DF	(India) IND	Anas Edathodika	28	0	26	0	2	0	0	0
25	DF	(India) IND	Srikanth Ramu	18	0	16	0	2	0	0	0
27	DF	(India) IND	Nallappan Mohanraj	3	0	3	0	0	0	0	0
6	MF	(India) IND	Shanmugam Venkatesh	6	1	6	1	0	0	0	0
8	MF	(India) IND	Arata Izumi	24	6	22	5	2	1	0	0
11	MF	(Ivory Coast) CIV	Pierre Djidjia Douhou	27	6	25	5	2	1	0	0
14	MF	(India) IND	Karma Tsewang	25	2	23	2	2	0	0	0
16	MF	(India) IND	Velington Rocha	7	0	7	0	0	0	0	0
17	MF	(India) IND	Sukhwinder Singh	5	1	5	1	0	0	0	0
18	MF	(India) IND	Asim Hassan	1	0	0	0	1	0	0	0
20	MF	(India) IND	Nikhil Kadam	6	1	5	1	1	0	0	0
22	MF	(India) IND	Khanthang Paite	20	3	20	3	0	0	0	0
23	MF	(India) IND	Mumtaz Akhtar	17	0	15	0	2	0	0	0
26	MF	(India) IND	Fanai Lalrempuia	3	0	3	0	0	0	0	0
32	MF	(India) IND	David Lalbiakzara	1	0	1	0	0	0	0	0
9	FW	(South Sudan) SSD	James Moga	24	16	24	16	0	0	0	0
10	FW	(India) IND	Jeje Lalpekhlua	22	6	19	5	3	1	0	0
12	FW	(India) IND	Singam Subhash Singh	16	4	14	4	2	0	0	0
29	FW	(Australia) AUS	Boima Karpeh	7	6	7	6	0	0	0	0

== Competitions ==
=== Pre-Season and friendlies ===
4 August 2012 Friendly	Pune	2–2	DSK Shivajians
	Subhash; Wali	Report

5 August 2012 Friendly	Pune	2–1	Pune F.C. Academy	Pune, Maharashtra
13:00 IST	Subhash (2 goals)	Report	Shoaib	Stadium: Balewadi Sports Complex

11 August 2012 Friendly	Pune	3–0	Amanora Deccan XI	Pune, Maharashtra
	Subhash; Asian Trialist; Williamson	Report		Stadium: Balewadi Sports Complex

12 August 2012 Friendly	Pune	1–0	Indian Air Force	Pune, Maharashtra
	Korean Trialist	Report		Stadium: Balewadi Sports Complex

13 August 2012 Friendly	Salgaocar	2–0	Pune	Margao, Goa
	Rooney; Dsouza	Report		Stadium: Chowgule College

14 August 2012 Friendly	Wilfred Leisure	1–1	Pune	Margao, Goa
		Report	Korean Trialist	Stadium: Chowgule College

16 August 2012 Friendly	Salgaocar	0–0	Pune	Margao, Goa
		Report		Stadium: Chowgule College

19 August 2012 Friendly	Margao SC	1–1	Pune	Margao, Goa
	Korean Trialist	Report	Unknown	Stadium: Chowgule College

20 August 2012 Friendly	Dempo	1–1	Pune	Margao, Goa
				Stadium: Chowgule College

21 August 2012 Friendly	Churchill Brothers	2–2	Pune	Margao, Goa
				Stadium: Chowgule College

=== Durand Cup ===
23 August 2012 Quarter-Finals	Pune	0–0	Central Reserve Police Force	New Delhi, Delhi
17:00 IST		Report		Stadium: Ambedkar Stadium

27 August 2012 Quarter-Finals	SESA Football Academy	1–1	Pune	New Delhi, Delhi
	Unknown		Lalpekhlua 90+1'	Stadium: Ambedkar Stadium

=== I-League ===
==== League table ====
Pos	Team	Pld	W	D	L	GF	GA	GD	Pts	Qualification or relegation
1	Churchill Brothers (C)	26	16	7	3	56	22	+34	55	Qualification for 2014 AFC Cup group stage
2	Pune	26	16	4	6	53	26	+27	52	Qualification for 2014 AFC Champions League qualifying play-off (Note: Pune were chosen to represent India in the AFC Champions League as they passed the club licensing requirements.)
3	East Bengal	26	13	8	5	44	18	+26	47	
4	Prayag United	26	13	5	8	55	35	+20	44	
5	Dempo	26	11	7	8	45	33	+12	40	

Source: IndiaFooty.com
Rules for classification: 1) points; 2) goal difference; 3) number of goals scored.
(C) Champions

==== Results summary ====
Overall								Home						Away					
Pld	W	D	L	GF	GA	GD	Pts	W	D	L	GF	GA	GD	W	D	L	GF	GA	GD
26	16	4	6	53	26	+27	52	6	4	3	24	16	+8	10	0	3	29	10	+19

Last updated: 12 May 2013.
Source: I-League table

==== Position by round ====
Round	1	2	3	4	5	6	7	8	9	10	11	12	13	14	15	16	17	18	19	20	21	22	23	24	25	26
Result	W	W	L	L	W	W	D	W	D	W	W	W	W	W	L	W	D	L	L	W	D	W	L	W	W	W
Position	3	3	6	7	5	6	7	5	5	4	4	3	2	2	2	3	4	4	5	4	3	3	3	3	2	2

Updated to match(es) played on 12 May 2013. Source: Pune FC
W = Win; D = Draw; L = Loss

8 October 2012 1	Pune	3–2	ONGC	Pune
18:30 IST	Jeje 22' (pen.); Subhash 47'; Venkatesh 72'	Report	Jatin 54'; Yusa 61'	Stadium: Balewadi Sports Complex; Referee: Adley Costa

11 October 2012 2	Pune	3–2	Mumbai	Pune
18:30 IST	Daisuke 7'; Daisuke 51'; Jeje 75'	Report	Quao 17'; Opara 26'	Stadium: Balewadi Sports Complex; Referee: Vishnu Chauhan

29 October 2012 3	East Bengal	1–0	Pune	Kolkata
14:30 IST	Chidi 28'	Report		Stadium: Yuba Bharati Krirangan; Referee: Armughan Rowan

4 November 2012 4	Pune	0–1	Churchill Brothers	Pune
18:30 IST		Report	Beto 90+2'	Stadium: Balewadi Sports Complex; Referee: Pranjal Banerjee

9 November 2012 5	Pailan Arrows	0–2	Pune	Kolkata
14:00 IST		Report	Karma 11'; Subhash 46'	Stadium: Yuba Bharati Krirangan; Referee: Rabichandra Singh

28 April 2013 6	Pune	4–0	Air India	Pune
18:30 IST	Moga 34'; Douhou 50'; Douhou 77'; Boima Karpeh 84'	report		Stadium: Balewadi Sports Complex; Referee: V. Chauhan

24 November 2012 7	Pune	2–2	United Sikkim	Pune
17:30 IST	Moga 1'; Moga 68'	Report	Attivi 25'; Safar 27'	Stadium: Balewadi Sports Complex; Referee: Umesh Bora

27 November 2012 8	SC Goa	1–2	Pune	Margao
19:00 IST	Obiora 21'	Report	Subhash 42'; Subhash 66'	Stadium: Fatorda Stadium; Referee: R. Shah

2 December 2012 9	Pune	2–2	Mohun Bagan	Pune
19:00 IST	Chika 30'; Arata 75'	Report	Odafe 77'; Odafe 84'	Stadium: Balewadi Sports Complex; Referee: Santosh Kumar

9 December 2012 10	Salgaocar	0–2	Pune	Margao
19:00 IST		Report	Paite 64'; Paite 78'	Stadium: Fatorda Stadium; Referee: Armughan Rowan

15 December 2012 11	Dempo	1–5	Pune	Margao
17:00 IST	Abranches 23'	Report	Moga 15'; Moga 53'; Arata 76'; Jeje 79'; Douhou 85'	Stadium: Fatorda Stadium; Referee: Umesh Bora

22 December 2012 12	Pune	3–1	Prayag United	Pune
18:30 IST	Moga 8'; Moga 77'; Tabia 17'	Report	Vineeth 51'	Stadium: Balewadi Sports Complex; Referee: A. Shekar

29 December 2012 13	Shillong Lajong	1–2	Pune	Shillong
16:00 IST	Singh 60'	Report	Jeje 30'; Paite 49'	Stadium: Nehru Stadium; Referee: P. Banerji

5 January 2013 14	United Sikkim	1–2	Pune	Gangtok
14:00 IST	Tamang 63'	Report	Arata 23'; Moga 90+1'	Stadium: Paljor Stadium; Referee: P. Dhar

9 January 2013 15	Prayag United	2–0	Pune	Kalyani
14:00 IST	Bhowmick 68'; Martins 85'	Report		Stadium: Kalyani Stadium; Referee: K. Singh

24 April 2013 16	Mohun Bagan A.C.	1–3	Pune FC	Kalyani
15:30 IST	Odafe 90+3'	Report	Douhou 27'; Moga 65'; Karma 77'	Stadium: Kalyani Stadium; Referee: U. Bora

20 January 2013 17	Pune FC	0–0	Sporting Goa	Pune
19:00 IST		Report		Stadium: Balewadi Sports Complex; Referee: A. Rowan

25 January 2013 18	Pune FC	1–2	East Bengal F.C.	Pune
19:30 IST	Arata 17'	Report	Chidi 6'; Chidi 75' (pen.)	Stadium: Balewadi Sports Complex; Referee: C. Srikrishna

2 February 2013 19	Pune FC	0–2	Salgaocar	Pune
19:00 IST		Report	Francis Fernandes 2'; Francis Fernandes 45'	Stadium: Balewadi Sports Complex; Referee: A. Pillai

9 February 2013 20	Mumbai FC	0–3	Pune FC	Pune
19:00 IST	James Moga 56'; James Moga 71'	Report	Arata 84'	Stadium: Balewadi Sports Complex; Referee: U. Bora

24 March 2013 21	Pune FC	2–2	Shillong Lajong	Pune
19:00 IST	Boima Karpeh 51'; Boima Karpeh 59'	Report	Edinho Júnior 13'; Edinho Júnior 56'	Stadium: Balewadi Sports Complex; Referee: A. Rowan

28 March 2013 22	Pune FC	2–0	Dempo SC	Pune
18:30 IST	Sukhwinder Singh 30'; James Moga 44'	Report		Stadium: Balewadi Sports Complex; Referee: R. Singh

5 April 2013 23	Churchill Brothers	2–1	Pune FC	Vasco da Gama, Goa
18:30 IST	Bineesh Balan 58'; Sunil Chhetri 63'	Report	Boima Karpeh 90+1'	Stadium: Tilak Maidan Stadium; Referee: A. Shekar

14 April 2013 24	ONGC	0–1	Pune FC	New Delhi
16:00 IST		Report	James Moga 45+2'	Stadium: Dr. Ambedkar Stadium; Referee: P. Dhar

20 April 2013 25	Air India	0–6	Pune FC	Pune
16:00 IST		Report	Boima Karpeh 26'; James Moga 39'; Douhou Pierre 52'; James Moga 67'; Jeje Lalpekhlua 74'; Nikhil Kadam 86'	Stadium: Balewadi Sports Complex; Referee: T. Nagvenkar

11 May 2013 26	Pune FC	2–0	Pailan Arrows	Pune
19:00 IST	James Moga 39'; Boima Karpeh 65'	Report		Stadium: Balewadi Sports Complex; Referee: P. Dhar
