= 2012–13 United Sikkim FC season =

Indian football club season

United Sikkim
2012–13 season
- Chairman: Baichung Bhutia
- Manager: Nathan Hall
- I-League: 13th
- Federation Cup: Group Stage
- Top goalscorer: League: 3 players on 1 goal All: 3 players on 1 goal
Home colours	Away colours

The 2012–13 United Sikkim F.C. season will be the club's third season since their formation in 2008 and their first season ever in the I-League which is India's top football league.

== Background ==
The road to the 2012 I-League 2nd Division did not start well for United Sikkim. On 11 June 2011 it was announced that Johnny Menyongar would leave the club to join I-League team Shillong Lajong as well as Indian internationals Renedy Singh and NS Manju in January 2012. However, after firing coach Stanley Rozario, United Sikkim signed Belgian Philippe De Ridder as coach of the team. The club the re-signed Nigerian Daniel Bedemi and Quinton Jacobs for the season. The club then began there charge for the I-League for the second season in a row with a 3–2 victory over Bhawanipore F.C. at the Satindra Mohan Dev Stadium in Assam on 2 February 2012. The club then went on to win three more matches during the first round of the I-League 2nd Division against Eagles, Southern Samity, and Ar-Hima in order to qualify for the 2012 I-League 2nd Division final round in which the club won promotion on the last day of the season on 17 April 2012 at the Paljor Stadium in Gangtok, Sikkim in front of 30,000 fans as United Sikkim drew Mohammedan 1–1 with Daniel Bedemi scoring the goal for United Sikkim.

== Transfers ==
=== In ===
#	Position	Player	Transferred from	Fee	Date	Ref
	FW	(Nigeria) Salau Nuruddin	(India) Green Valley	Free	23 August 2012	
	FW	(India) Budhiram Tudu	(India) East Bengal	Free	24 May 2012	
	DF	(India) Anwar Ali	(India) Mohun Bagan	Free	5 August 2012	
	FW	(India) Nima Tamang	(India) Sikkim Football Academy	Free	5 August 2012	
	DF	(India) Mobin Rai	(India) Sikkim Football Academy	Free	5 August 2012	
	DF	(India) Shabbir Ali	(India) Prayag United	Free	5 August 2012	
	DF	(India) Mashangva Zenith	(India) Shillong Lajong	Free	5 August 2012	
	DF	(India) Ashish Chettri	(India) Royal Wahingdoh	Free	5 August 2012	
	MF	(India) Lineker Machado	Union Bank of India	Free	5 August 2012	
	DF	(India) Rahul Jaiswal	Unattached	Free	5 August 2012	
	MF	(India) Raju Debnath	Unattached	Free	5 August 2012	
	MF	(South Korea) Yoon Tae	Unattached	Free	5 August 2012	
	MF	(Costa Rica) Michael Rodríguez	(Costa Rica) Herediano	Free	12 September 2012	
	FW	(Togo) Sogan Kokou	Unattached	Free	12 September 2012	

=== Out ===
#	Position	Player	Transferred to	Fee	Date	Ref
	MF	(Namibia) Quinton Jacobs	(India) Salgaocar	Free	6 May 2012	
	MF	(Nigeria) John Babatunde	Released	Free	8 June 2012	
	GK	(India) Basant Singh	(India) Shillong Lajong	Free	8 June 2012	
	DF	(India) Govin Singh	(India) Shillong Lajong	Free	8 June 2012	
	FW	(India) Karan Atwal	(India) Salgaocar	Free	9 June 2012	
	GK	(India) Arnab Das Sharma	(India) Mohammedan	Free	2 July 2012	
	MF	(India) Mumtaz Akhtar	(India) Pune	Free	8 July 2012	
	DF	(India) Baldeep Singh	Air India	Free	16 August 2012	
	FW	(Nigeria) Daniel Bedemi	Released	Free	1 September 2012	

== Competitions ==
=== Federation Cup ===
United Sikkim entered the 2012 Indian Federation Cup automatically following promotion to the I-League. They were placed in Group D along with Salgaocar, Pune, and Prayag United and their matches were played in Jamshedpur. The tournament did not end well for United Sikkim as they lost all three of their matches, finishing with 0 points, 0 goals scored and 6 conceded.

20 September 2012 Group Stage	Pune	1 – 0	United Sikkim	Jamshedpur, Orissa
15:00 IST	Lalpekhlua 51'	Report		Stadium: Keenan Stadium

22 September 2012 Group Stage	United Sikkim	0 – 3	Salgaocar	Jamshedpur, Orissa
15:00 IST		Report	Guirado 2'; Colaco 81'; D'Souza 85'	Stadium: JRD Tata Sports Complex

24 September 2012 Group Stage	Prayag United	2 – 0	United Sikkim	Jamshedpur, Orissa
15:00 IST	Rafique 6', 14'	Report		Stadium: Keenan Stadium

=== I-League ===
United Sikkim began their first I-League campaign of 2012–13 at home on 6 October 2012 against the champions of the 2010-11 season, Salgaocar and took the victory 3–2 in what is considered an early upset in the season.

==== Results summary ====
Overall								Home						Away					
Pld	W	D	L	GF	GA	GD	Pts	W	D	L	GF	GA	GD	W	D	L	GF	GA	GD
16	1	7	8	16	37	−21	10	1	4	3	7	9	−2	0	3	5	9	28	−19

Last updated: 19 January 2013.
Source: United Sikkim F.C results

==== Position by round ====
Round	1	2	3	4	5	6	7	8	9	10	11	12	13	14	15	16	17	18	19	20	21	22	23	24	25	26
Result	W	L	L	D	L	L	D	D	D	D	L	C	D	L	D	L	L									
Position	5	8	9	10	11	13	13	12	12	12	11	12	14	13	13	13	13									

Updated to match(es) played on 19 January 2013. Source: United Sikkim FC
W = Win; D = Draw; L = Loss

6 October 2012 Round 1	United Sikkim	3 – 2	Salgaocar	Gangtok, Sikkim
15:00 IST	Nuruddin 53'; Machado 67'; Jhingan 73'	Report	Guirado 49'; Gonsalves 57'	Stadium: Paljor Stadium

11 October 2012 Round 2	United Sikkim	0 – 1	East Bengal	Gangtok, Sikkim
14:30 IST		Report	Ralte 82'	Stadium: Paljor Stadium

28 October 2012 Round 3	United Sikkim	1 – 2	Dempo	Gangtok, Sikkim
14:30 IST	Nuruddin 59'	Report	Sakibo 20'; Sueoka 90+3' (pen.)	Stadium: Paljor Stadium

4 November 2012 Round 4	United Sikkim	0 – 0	Pailan Arrows	Gangtok, Sikkim
14:00 IST		Report		Stadium: Paljor Stadium; Referee: C. Srikrishna

10 November 2012 Round 5	Prayag United	10 – 1	United Sikkim	Kolkata, West Bengal
14:00 IST	Martins 3', 16', 39', 77', 79'; Hernández 22', 35'; Tulunga 71'; Rafique 90+1'; Rodríguez 90+2' (o.g.)	Report	Tamang 5'	Stadium: Salt Lake Stadium; Referee: N. Sundi

5 January 2013 Round 14	United Sikkim	1 - 2	Pune	Gangtok, Sikkim
14:00 IST	Tamang 63'	Report	Arata 23'; Moga 90+1'	Stadium: Paljor Stadium; Referee: P. Dhar

13 January 2013 Round 16	Churchill Brothers	2 - 1	United Sikkim	Mapusa, Goa
15:45 IST	Beto 4'; Antchouet 72' (pen.)	Report	Matkin 77'	Stadium: Duler Stadium; Referee: R. Dsa

19 January 2013 Round 17	Dempo	7 – 0	United Sikkim	Mapusa, Goa
15:45 IST	Abranches 5'; Miranda 35', 77'; Sakibo 56', 59', 90+4'; Ferrao 84'	Report		Stadium: Duler Stadium; Referee: A. Meetei

== Appearances and goals ==
As of 11 October 2012

No.	Pos	Nat	Player	Total		I-League		Federation Cup	
No.	Pos	Nat	Player	Apps	Goals	Apps	Goals	Apps	Goals
	GK	(South Korea) KOR	Yoon Tae	2	0	2+0	0	0+0	0
	GK	(India) IND	Monotosh Ghosh	4	0	0+1	0	3+0	0
	DF	(India) IND	Mashangva Zenith	3	0	0+0	0	3+0	0
	DF	(India) IND	Munmun Lugun	5	0	2+0	0	3+0	0
	DF	(India) IND	Anwar Ali	5	0	2+0	0	3+0	0
	DF	(Costa Rica) CRC	Michael Rodríguez	2	0	2+0	0	0+0	0
	DF	(India) IND	Sandesh Jhingan	5	1	2+0	1	3+0	0
	DF	(India) IND	Rahul Jaiswal	5	0	2+0	0	3+0	0
	DF	(India) IND	Mobin Rai	0	0	0+0	0	0+0	0
	MF	(India) IND	Nim Lepcha	0	0	0+0	0	0+0	0
	MF	(India) IND	Ashish Chettri	5	0	2+0	0	3+0	0
	MF	(Togo) TOG	Sogan Kokou	1	0	0+1	0	0+0	0
	MF	(India) IND	Shahensha Ansari	4	0	1+1	0	1+1	0
	MF	(India) IND	Raju Debnath	2	0	0+0	0	2+0	0
	MF	(India) IND	Lineker Machado	5	1	2+0	1	3+0	0
	MF	(India) IND	Shabbir Ali	3	0	0+1	0	2+0	0
	FW	(India) IND	Baichung Bhutia	0	0	0+0	0	0+0	0
	FW	(India) IND	Budhiram Tudu	5	0	2+0	0	3+0	0
	FW	(India) IND	Tenzin Bhutia	1	0	0+0	0	0+1	0
	FW	(India) IND	Nima Tamang	0	0	0+0	0	0+0	0
	FW	(Nigeria) NGA	Salau Nuruddin	3	1	2+0	1	1+0	0

== Goalscorers ==
Place	Position	Nationality	Name	I-League	Federation Cup	Total
1	FW	(Nigeria)	Salau Nuruddin	1	0	1
1	MF	(India)	Lineker Machado	1	0	1
1	DF	(India)	Sandesh Jhingan	1	0	1
			TOTALS	3	0	3
