= 2014 I-League 2nd Division final round =

Tournament details
- Country: India
- Teams: 5

Final positions
- Champions: Royal Wahingdoh
- Runners-up: Bhawanipore

Tournament statistics
- Top goal scorer(s): Daniel Bedemi (8 goals)

The 2014 I-League 2nd Division final round is the seventh final round of the I-League 2nd Division. The tournament began after the group stage was completed on 18 February 2014. Royal Wahingdoh won the tournament and will be promoted to 2014–15 I-League.

== Final round table ==
United Sikkim are given direct entry to the final around, as they were relegated from 2012–13 I-League. Royal Wahingdoh F.C. and Kalighat Milan Sangha F.C. qualified from Group A and Bhawanipore F.C. and Hindustan F.C. qualified from group B.

Pos	Team	Pld	W	D	L	GF	GA	GD	Pts	Qualification or relegation
1	Royal Wahingdoh (C, P)	8	5	3	0	12	2	+10	18	Promotion to 2014–15 I-League
2	Bhawanipore	8	5	2	1	16	7	+9	17	
3	Kalighat MS	8	3	1	4	10	11	−1	10	
4	United Sikkim	8	2	1	5	9	12	−3	7	
5	Hindustan	8	1	1	6	6	17	−11	4	

Source: i-league.orgGlobal Sports Archive
Rules for classification: 1) points; 2) goal difference; 3) number of goals scored.
(C) Champions; (P) Promoted

== Fixtures and results ==
=== First leg ===
23 March 2014	United Sikkim	0 – 1	Royal Wahingdoh	Satindra Mohan Dev Stadium, Silchar
15:00 IST			Babatunde 28'

23 March 2014	Kalighat MS	1 – 2	Bhawanipore	Satindra Mohan Dev Stadium, Silchar
17:30 IST	Gbilee 90+4'		Bedemi 9', 25'

25 March 2014	Hindustan	2 – 5	United Sikkim	Satindra Mohan Dev Stadium, Silchar
15:00 IST	Kabui 7'; Adewumi 27'		Somide 19', 79'; Lepcha 65', 68'; Singh 88'

25 March 2014	Bhawanipore	0 – 0	Royal Wahingdoh	Satindra Mohan Dev Stadium, Silchar
17:30 IST

27 March 2014	United Sikkim	0 – 1	Bhawanipore	Satindra Mohan Dev Stadium, Silchar
15:00 IST			Mohanraj 25'

27 March 2014	Hindustan	2 – 0	Kalighat MS	Satindra Mohan Dev Stadium, Silchar
17:30 IST	Sola 65'; Lepcha 73'

29 March 2014	Kalighat MS	1 – 0	United Sikkim	Satindra Mohan Dev Stadium, Silchar
15:00 IST	Biswas 90+2'

29 March 2014	Royal Wahingdoh	0 – 0	Hindustan	Satindra Mohan Dev Stadium, Silchar
17:30 IST

31 March 2014	Kalighat MS	1 – 1	Royal Wahingdoh	Satindra Mohan Dev Stadium, Silchar
15:00 IST	Gbilee 70'		Singh 21'

31 March 2014	Hindustan	0 – 2	Bhawanipore	Satindra Mohan Dev Stadium, Silchar
17:30 IST			Bedemi 6'; Kundu 90+1' (o.g.)

=== Second leg ===
3 April 2014	Hindustan	1 – 2	Royal Wahingdoh	Lammual, Aizawl
15:30 IST	Lepcha 24'		Babatunde 3'; Singh 32'

3 April 2014	Bhawanipore	1 – 1	United Sikkim	Lammual, Aizawl
18:30 IST	Silveira 52'		Somide 23'

5 April 2014	Kalighat MS	3 – 0	Hindustan	Lammual, Aizawl
15:30 IST	Kundu 43' (o.g.); Gbilee 78'; Bagui 86'

5 April 2014	Royal Wahingdoh	3 – 2	United Sikkim	Lammual, Aizawl
18:30 IST	Babatunde 18', 45'; Bawar 40' (pen.)		Williamson 42'; Ansari 71'

7 April 2014	Bhawanipore	4 – 1	Kalighat MS	Lammual, Aizawl
18:30 IST	Mohanraj 10'; Dowary 45', 49'; Bedemi 78'	Report	Kinglsey 28'

7 April 2014	United Sikkim	1 – 0	Hindustan	Lammual, Aizawl
22:00 IST	Singh 55'	Report

9 April 2014	Bhawanipore	4 – 1	Hindustan	Lammual, Aizawl
16:00 IST	Bedemi 37', 45+1'; Dutta 60'; Ruidas 69'	Report	Mehra 18'

9 April 2014	Royal Wahingdoh	2 – 0	Kalighat MS	Lammual, Aizawl
18:30 IST	Bawar 18'; Singh 81'	Report

11 April 2014	United Sikkim	0 – 3	Kalighat MS	Lammual, Aizawl
15:30 IST			Zodinliana 22'; Sunday 28'; Onrao 42'

11 April 2014	Royal Wahingdoh	3 – 2	Bhawanipore	Lammual, Aizawl
19:00 IST	Singh 37'; Babatunde 55'; Bawar 87'	Report	Bedemi 23', 74'

== Goalscorers ==
8 goals:

- (Nigeria) Daniel Bedemi (Bhawanipore)

5 goals:

- (Nigeria) Badmus Babatunde (Royal Wahingdoh)

3 goals:

- (Liberia) Bekay Bewar (Royal Wahingdoh)
- (Liberia) James Gbilee (Kalighat MS)
- (Nigeria) Oluwaunmi Somide (United Sikkim)

2 goals:

- (India) Dipendu Dowary (Bhawanipore)
- (India) Jackichand Singh (Royal Wahingdoh)
- (India) Mayal Dok Lepcha (United Sikkim)
- (India) Mayel Lepcha (Hindustan)
- (India) Pradeep Mohanraj (Bhawanipore)

1 goal:

- (India) Abinash Ruidas (Bhawanipore)
- (Brazil) Alex Petroman da Silveira (Bhawanipore)
- (India) Arijit Bagui (Kalighat MS)
- (India) Bhim Onrao (Kalighat MS)
- (India) Deepak Mehra (Hindustan)
- (Nigeria) Eze Kinglsey (Kalighat MS)
- (India) James Lukram Singh (United Sikkim)
- (India) Jeh Williamson (United Sikkim)
- (Nigeria) Joel Sunday (Kalighat MS)
- (Sierra Leone) Joshua Adewumi (Hindustan)
- (India) Khemson Kabui (Hindustan)
- (Nigeria) O. O. Sola (Hindustan)
- (India) Phaoom Biswas (Kalighat MS)
- (India) Reagan Singh (Royal Wahingdoh)
- (India) Satiyasen Singh (Royal Wahingdoh)
- (India) Shahensha Ansari (United Sikkim)
- (India) Snehashish Dutta (Bhawanipore)
- (India) Sukhwinder Singh (United Sikkim)
- (India) Zodinliana (Kalighat MS)
