= Subhash Singh Singam =

Indian footballer (born 1990)

Subhash Singh
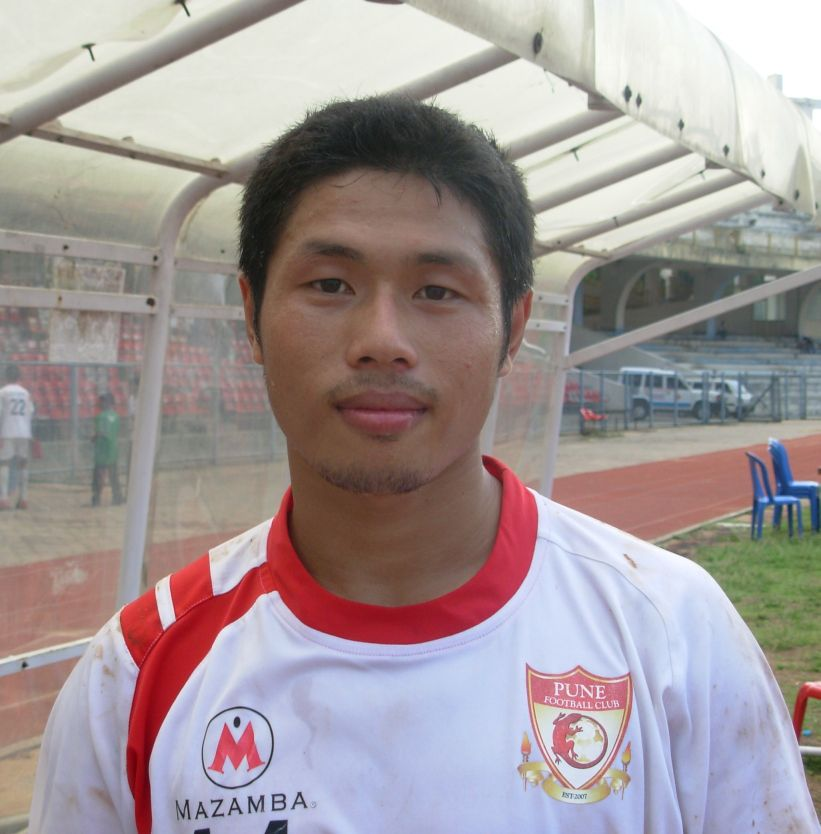

Personal information
- Full name: Subhash Singh Singam
- Date of birth: 2 February 1990 (age 36)
- Place of birth: Manipur, India
- Height: 1.74 m (5 ft 8 1/2 in)
- Position: Winger

Team information
- Current team: Sagolband United

Youth career
- 2005–2007: Sports Authority of India Manipur
- 2007: ESU Manipur

Senior career*
Years	Team	Apps	(Gls)
2007–2009	Air India		
2009–2010	East Bengal		
2010–2011	Salgaocar		
2011	→ Pune (loan)	15	(1)
2011–2013	Pune	40	(11)
2013–2014	Shillong Lajong	21	(3)
2014	Mumbai City	22	(1)
2015	→ Bharat FC (loan)	18	(2)
2016	→ Mohun Bagan (loan)	1	(0)
2016–2019	NEROCA	35	(8)
2019–2020	Real Kashmir	4	(1)
2020	NEROCA	7	(1)
2020–2021	Mohammedan	2	(0)
2021–2022	Gokulam Kerala	1	(0)
2022–	Sagolband United	0	(0)

International career^{‡}
2007–2008	India U19		
2010	India U23		
- * Club domestic league appearances and goals as of 19:58, 29 March 2019 (UTC) ‡ National team caps and goals as of 09:42, 4 February 2015 (UTC)

Subhash Singh Singam (Meitei: Singam Subhash Singh, born 2 February 1990) is an Indian professional footballer who plays as a winger for Indian club Sagolband United.

== Youth career ==
Subhash had to choose between football or weight-lifting as a career option, his father preferred him to follow the latter, but his family backed him to become a footballer after impressive performances in village tournaments as a kid. He would join the Sports Authority of India at Manipur in 2005 at 15 and spend two years honing his skills before playing for ESU, a Manipuri football club.

== Senior career ==
=== Air India ===
It was soon after his first year with his club in Manipur that his cousin Samson Singh recognizing the potential Subhash had, invited him for a trial with Air-India. The striker impressed the Pilots and was soon signed by the club for their senior team. He enjoyed great success in his two-year stint with the Mumbai-based club and even finished as second top scorer amongst Indians in his second season at the I-League club.

=== East Bengal ===
Subhash moved to Kolkata giants East Bengal in 2009, with whom he spent a season during which he also made his India U23 debut.

=== Pune ===
After a short unsuccessful 6-month spell at Salgaocar in 2010, he was loaned out to Pune for the second half of the 2010–11 I-League. His speed and dribbling skills added a new dimension to Pune FC's playing style and he soon became a crowd favorite. With his loan signing proving to be a success, Derrick Pereira was quick to sign him permanently at the end of the season. Subhash repaid the faith shown in him by the Pune FC management by scoring the goals that helped the club to a top-5 finish. His on-field performances won him the "Young Player of the Year 2011-12″.

=== Shillong Lajong ===
In June 2013, Singh signed a one-year deal with Shillong Lajong. He made his debut for Lajong in the I-League on 22 September 2013 against Dempo at the Duler Stadium in which he came on as a substitute for Uilliams in the 73rd minute as Shillong Lajong won the match 0–3.

=== Mumbai City ===
In October 2014, Subhash joined Indian Super League team Mumbai City for 2014 season. He scored his first goal on 18 October 2014 against FC Pune City in 5–0 win.

==== Bharat FC (loan) ====
Subhash signed for newly promoted I-League club Bharat FC for the 2014–2015 season on loan from Mumbai City.

=== Mohun Bagan (loan) ===
In June 2015 Subhash was signed by Mohun Bagan on loan for the 2015–16 I-League season.
