= Douhou =

Douhou is both a given name and a surname. Notable people with the name include:

- Douhou Pierre (born 1987), Ivorian footballer
- Ahmed Douhou (born 1976), French sprinter
