= 2012 I-League 2nd Division =

5th season of the I-League 2nd Division

I-League 2nd Division
- Season: 2011–12
- Champions: ONGC
- Promoted: ONGC; United Sikkim

The 2012 I-League 2nd Division was the fifth season of the then second tier of Football in India, using promotion and relegation with the I-League.

== Stadiums ==
The 2012 I-League 2nd Division was played in 4 stadiums. Three of the stadiums were used for the Group Stage and one for the Final Stage.

The stadiums used in the group stage were the Barabati Stadium (Orissa), Ambedkar Stadium (New Delhi) and the Satindra Mohan Dev Stadium (Assam).

== Team overview ==
=== Teams and locations ===
Location of teams in the 2012 I-League 2nd Division

Team	Location
Ar-Hima	Shillong, Meghalaya
Aizawl	Aizawl, Mizoram
Bhawanipore	Kolkata, West Bengal
Eagles	Ernakulam, Kerala
Golden Threads	Kochi, Kerala
Green Valley	Guwahati, Assam
Gauhati Town Club	Guwahati, Assam
Kalighat	Kolkata, West Bengal
Kenkre	Mumbai, Maharashtra
KGF Academy	Bangalore, Karnataka
Langsning	Shillong, Meghalaya
Luangmual	Aizawl, Mizoram
Mohammedan	Kolkata, West Bengal
PIFA	Mumbai, Maharashtra
Quartz	Calicut, Kerala
Royal Wahingdoh	Shillong, Meghalaya
Salameswari	Bhubaneswar, Orissa
Simla Youngs	New Delhi
SESA	Vasco de Gama, Goa
Southern Samity	Kolkata, West Bengal
Techno Aryan	Kolkata, West Bengal
United Sikkim	Gangtok, Sikkim
Vasco	Vasco de Gama, Goa

=== Personnel and sponsoring ===
Team	Manager	Team captain	Kit Sponsor	Kit Maker
Ar-Hima	(India) Subrata Bhattacharyya	TBA	TBA	Adidas
Aizawl	TBA	TBA	TBA	TBA
Bhawanipore	(India) Debjit Ghosh	TBA	TBA	TBA
Eagles	(India) Jo Paul Ancheri	(India) Saji Joy	TBA	TBA
Golden Threads	TBA	TBA	TBA	Adidas
Green Valley	(India) Mridul Banerjee	TBA	TBA	TBA
Gauhati Town Club	(Brazil) Juliano Fontana	TBA	TBA	TBA
Kalighat	TBA	TBA	TBA	TBA
Kenkre	(India) Floyd Pinto	TBA	TBA	TBA
KGF Academy	(India) Raman Vijayan	TBA	TBA	TBA
Langsning	(India) L Darlong	TBA	TBA	TBA
Luangmaul	TBA	TBA	TBA	Adidas
Mohammedan	(India) Aloke Mukherjee	(Nigeria) Stanley Okoroigwe	EMTA	Reebok
PIFA	(India) Nirvan Shah	TBA	TBA	TBA
Quartz	(Germany) Frank Braner	TBA	TBA	TBA
Royal Wahingdoh	(India) Carlton Chapman	(India) Seityasen Singh	Imperial Blue	Uhlsport
Samaleswari	TBA	TBA	TBA	TBA
Simla Youngs	(India) Manoj Chaudhary	TBA	TBA	TBA
SESA	(Nigeria) Clifford Chukwuma	TBA	SESA	TBA
Southern Samity	(India) Shabbir Ali	(India) Franchis Xavier	Five Star Samity	Nike
Techno Aryan	(India) Raghu Nandi	TBA	Techno India Group	TBA
United Sikkim	(Belgium) Philippe De Ridder	(India) Nim Lepcha	EMTA	Nike
Vasco	(India) Robert Fernandes	TBA	TBA	TBA

=== Managerial Changes ===
Team	Outgoing manager	Manner of departure	Date of vacancy	Position in table	Incoming manager	Date of appointment
United Sikkim	(India) Stanley Rozario	Sacked	3 December 2011	Pre-season	(Belgium) Philippe De Ridder	3 December 2011
Quartz	New Club			Pre-Season	(Germany) Frank Braner	1 January 2012

== Group stage ==
=== Group A ===
Group A will take place at the Barabati Stadium in Orissa.

Team	Pld	W	D	L	GF	GA	GD	Pts	Qualification
Royal Wahingdoh	7	5	2	0	18	7	+11	17	final round
Kalighat	7	5	1	1	20	6	+14	16	final round
SESA	7	4	2	1	15	9	+6	14	
Techno Aryan	7	2	3	2	13	8	+5	9	
Samaleswari	7	2	2	3	13	14	-1	8	
Kenkre	7	2	1	4	2	16	-14	7	
Gauhati Town Club	7	2	0	5	11	14	-3	6	
Quartz	7	0	1	6	4	29	-25	1	

=== Group B ===
Group B will take place at the Ambedkar Stadium in New Delhi.

Team	Pld	W	D	L	GF	GA	GD	Pts	Qualification
Mohammedan	7	6	1	0	15	4	+11	19	final round
Vasco	7	5	1	1	16	6	+10	16	final round
Langsning	7	4	1	2	10	8	+2	13	
KGF Academy	7	3	0	4	15	13	+2	9	
Simla Youngs	7	1	4	2	8	9	-1	7	
Golden Threads	7	2	1	4	12	18	-6	7	
Luangmaul	7	1	2	4	8	17	-9	5	
PIFA	7	0	2	5	5	14	-9	2	

=== Group C ===
Group C will take place at the Satindra Mohan Dev Stadium in Assam.

Team	Pld	W	D	L	GF	GA	GD	Pts	Qualification
United Sikkim	6	4	1	1	18	11	+7	13	final round
Aizawl	6	4	1	1	11	4	+7	13	final round
Ar-Hima	6	3	2	1	18	12	+6	11	
Green Valley	6	1	5	0	11	10	1	8	
Southern Samity	6	1	2	3	8	10	-2	5	
Bhawanipore	6	0	3	3	8	11	-3	3	
Eagles	6	1	0	5	4	20	-16	3	

== Final round ==
The final round of the 2012 I-League 2nd Division will take place between six teams from the group stage and the team relegated from I-League ONGC in a single table format in which each team plays each other once at home and once away from home.

Pos	Team	Pld	W	D	L	GF	GA	GD	Pts	Qualification or relegation
1	ONGC	12	6	4	2	20	9	+11	22	Promotion to 2012–13 I-League
2	United Sikkim	12	6	4	2	22	17	+5	22	Promotion to 2012–13 I-League
3	Mohammedan	12	6	3	3	15	11	+4	21	
4	Royal Wahingdoh	12	5	1	6	14	14	0	16	
5	Kalighat	12	4	4	4	18	15	+3	16	
6	Vasco	12	3	4	5	18	23	−5	13	
7	Aizawl	12	1	2	9	13	31	−18	5	

Source: The AIFF
Rules for classification: 1) points; 2) goal difference; 3) number of goals scored.

== Statistics ==
Updated: 20 February 2012

=== Top goalscorers ===
Rank	Player	Club	Goals
1	(Nigeria) Emmanuel Okoro	KGF Academy	9
2	(Nigeria) Akabougu C.	Golden Threads	5
3	(India) Angelo Colaco	Vasco	4
4	(Nigeria) Daniel Bedemi	United Sikkim	3
4	(Nigeria) Andrew Jgado	Vasco	3
4	(Nigeria) Salau Nuruddin	Green Valley	3
4	(Nigeria) Olatunde Komolafe	Kenkre	3
4	(India) P. Biswas	Kalighat	3
4	(Liberia) Alfred Jaryan	Mohammedan	3
9	12 players on 1 goal		

=== Hat-tricks ===
Player	For	Against	Result	Date
(Nigeria) Salau Nuruddin	Green Valley	United Sikkim	3–3	8 February 2012
(Nigeria) Andrew Jgado	Vasco	Golden Threads	5–1	11 February 2012
(India) P. Biswas	Kalighat	Quartz	9–0	17 February 2012
(Nigeria) Akabougu C.	Golden Threads	Luangmaul	4–3	17 February 2012
(Nigeria) Emmanuel Okoro^{7}	KGF Academy	Luangmaul	7–1	19 February 2012

- ^{7} Player scored 7 goals

=== Scoring ===
- First goal of the season: Stanley Cyprian for Mohammedan against KGF Academy (1 February 2012)
- Fastest goal of the season: 15 minutes – Isa Ali for Vasco against PIFA (1 February 2012)
- Most goals in a game: 9 goals
  - United Sikkim 7–2 Eagles (5 February 2012)
  - Quartz 0–9 Kalighat (17 February 2012)
- Most goals scored in a game by one team: 9 goals – Kalighat 9–0 Quartz (17 February 2012)
