= Daisuke Nishiguchi =

Japanese footballer (born 1988)

Personal information
- Date of birth: 1 January 1988 (age 38)
- Place of birth: Osaka, Japan
- Height: 1.81 m (5 ft 11 in)
- Position: Attacking midfielder

Team information
- Current team: DSK Shivajians F.C.

Youth career
- Cerezo Osaka

Senior career*
Years	Team	Apps	(Gls)
2011–2012	Olimpia	14	(0)
2012–2013	Pune	15	(2)
2013–	DSK Shivajians F.C.		
- * Club domestic league appearances and goals

Daisuke Nishiguchi (西口 大輔, Nishiguchi Daisuke; born 1 January 1988 in Osaka) is a Japanese footballer who plays as an attacking midfielder for DSK Shivajians F.C. in the I-League 2nd Division.

== Career ==
=== Pune ===
After graduating from the Cerezo Osaka Academy Nishiguchi joined Moldovan Divizia Naţională side FC Olimpia where he played in 14 matches during the 2011–12 season and then made 2 starts for Olimpia at the beginning of the 2012–13 season before signing for Pune F.C. of the I-League in India. He made his debut for Pune FC during the 2012 Indian Federation Cup on 20 September 2012 in Pune's first match of the tournament against United Sikkim F.C. in which Nishiguchi came on as a 76th-minute substitute for Pierre Djidjia Douhou as Pune won 1–0. He then made his I-League debut on 8 October 2012 against ONGC F.C. at home at the Balewadi Sports Complex where he played for only 64 minutes before being replaced by Shanmugam Venkatesh in a game where Pune won 3–2. Nishiguchi then scored his first two goals for Pune FC in his second I-League game for the club on 11 October 2012 against Mumbai F.C. at the Balewadi Sports Complex in which he scored in the 7th and 51st minute as Pune won 3–2 again.

== Career statistics ==
=== Club ===
Statistics accurate as of 12 October 2012

Club	Season	League		Cup		Other		International		Total	
Club	Season	Apps	Goals	Apps	Goals	Apps	Goals	Apps	Goals	Apps	Goals
Olimpia	2011–12	12	0	0	0	0	0	—	—	12	0
Olimpia	2012–13	2	0	0	0	0	0	—	—	2	0
Pune	2012–13	2	2	3	0	0	0	—	—	5	2
Career total		16	2	3	0	0	0	0	0	19	2
