= Edmar Figueira =

Brazilian footballer (born 1984)

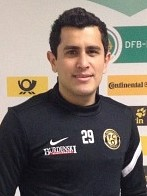
- Figueira at FC Oberneuland in 2012

Personal information
- Date of birth: 13 May 1984 (age 42)
- Place of birth: Naviraí MS, Brazil
- Height: 1.85 m (6 ft 1 in)
- Position: Forward

Youth career
- 1999: PTSC
- 2000: União Bandeirante
- 2001: Paranavaí

Senior career*
Years	Team	Apps	(Gls)
2001–2002	Matsubara		
2003–2004	Grasshopper Club Zurich		
2004–2005	Matsubara		
2006–2007	America-RJ		
2007–2008	FC Banants		
2008–2009	Cartaginés	19	(8)
2009–2011	Pune	40	(28)
2011–2012	Feirense	0	(0)
2011–2012	Ceahlăul Piatra Neamț	6	(0)
2012–2013	FC Oberneuland	8	(2)
2012–2013	Al-Shorta SC		
2013–2014	Rangdajied United	10	(1)
2014–2015	São Paulo-RS		
- * Club domestic league appearances and goals

Edmar Figueira (born 13 May 1984) is a Brazilian professional footballer who played as a forward.

== Career ==
Figueira made his first football steps as a youth in Brazilian clubs Paraná Soccer Technical Center (PSTC), União Bandeirante and Paranavaí. He became a professional footballer by playing in Matsubara and quickly his good potential and performances there give him his first chance in Europe, in the Swiss club Grasshopper Club Zurich in 2003 at the age of 18. He also passed a short period in Germany under negotiation with the Bundesliga Club SC Freiburg, but did not sign because of not having an EU passport.

Figueira decided to return to Brazil to play again for Matsubara, and won the BTV laser cup 2004 in Vietnam with them.

His next signing after that must be noticed as he had the chance to play for club America from Rio de Janeiro. His next attempt away from Brazil after being more experienced, was in 2007 when he went to Armenia to play in the UEFA Europa League qualifiers with FC Banants. In the next season 2008–09, he was transferred to Primera Division de Costa Rica to play for Cartaginés.

After a good season with Cartaginés in the Primera Division de Costa Rica, Figueira got a good offer from India and signed for the I-League newboys Pune for the 2009–10 season, where he made history helping Pune finish third in his debut. With 15 goals in his first I-League season for Pune, Figueira was awarded "Player of the Year" winning the "Golden Ball 2010" and two more prizes: "Golden Goal" for the best goal scored in the league and the "Player's Player of the Year" award as well.

Figueira renewed his contract with Pune on 31 May 2011, for the season 2010–11.

After scoring 28 goals in 40 matches, Figueira was the only player in the history of the I-League to be transferred to a Europe top division club, Feirense. Without to playing an official match, he canceled his contract and signed to Liga I Romanian first division Ceahlăul Piatra Neamț for the 2011–12 season.

After a season in Romenia Liga I with some injury problems, Figueira went to Germany and signed with FC Oberneuland from Bremen to play the DFB-Pokal and Regionalliga Nord the season 2012–13 season.

After half season with the German team, he transferred to Al-Shorta SC from Syria to play in the Asia AFC Cup 2013.

He signed for Rangdajied United for the 2013–14 season to start his second spell in India.

After long time playing outside He sign for São Paulo from Rio Grande-RS Brazil to play the first division of the Brazilian championship Gauchão 2015.
