= Shahensha Ansari =

Indian footballer (born 1981)

Personal information
- Full name: Shahensha Ansari
- Date of birth: 23 December 1981 (age 44)
- Place of birth: Sikkim, India
- Position: Midfielder

Team information
- Current team: Sikkim Aakraman

Senior career*
Years	Team	Apps	(Gls)
2012–2014	United Sikkim		
2015	Gangtok Himalayan		
2017–	Sikkim Aakraman		
- * Club domestic league appearances and goals as of 16:30, 8 July 2020 (UTC)

Shahensha Ansari (born 23 December 1981) is an Indian footballer who plays as a midfielder for Sikkim Premier Division League club Sikkim Aakraman.

== Club career ==
Born in Sikkim, Ansari was part of the Sikkim side that participated in the Santosh Trophy in 2004. In 2012, Ansari would join I-League 2nd Division side United Sikkim. He would help United Sikkim earn promotion to the top tier I-League for the next season. He made his professional debut for the club on 20 September 2012 against Pune in the Federation Cup. He came on as a substitute for Shabbir Ali as United Sikkim lost 0–1. Ansari then made his debut in the I-League on 6 October 2012 against Salgaocar. He came off the bench again for Raju Debnath as United Sikkim won 3–2.

After one season, United Sikkim were relegated and Ansari continued playing for the club in the I-League 2nd Division.

In 2015, Ansari moved to Gangtok Himalayan who would also participate in the I-League 2nd Division.

Ansari then joined Sikkim Aakraman in the local Sikkim Premier Division League where he played for the club in 2017 and continued to do so in 2019.

== Career statistics ==
=== Club ===
As of match played 12 May 2013

Appearances and goals by club, season and competition
Club	Season	League			Cup		Continental		Total	
Club	Season	Division	Apps	Goals	Apps	Goals	Apps	Goals	Apps	Goals
United Sikkim	2012–13	I-League	20	0	1	—	—	0	21	0
Career total			20	0	1	0	0	0	21	0

== Honours ==
United Sikkim

- I-League 2nd Division: 2012
