= Salau Nuruddin =

Nigerian footballer (born 1989)

Personal information
- Full name: Nurudeen Olawale Salau
- Date of birth: 4 April 1989 (age 37)
- Place of birth: Nigeria
- Position: Forward

Team information
- Current team: United Sikkim
- Number: 10

Senior career*
Years	Team	Apps	(Gls)
- Manang Marshyangdi
- Tollygunge Agragami
- Green Valley
2012–2013	United Sikkim	25	(6)
- * Club domestic league appearances and goals as of 12 May 2013

Nurudeen Olawale Salau (born 4 April 1989) is a Nigerian footballer who plays as a forward for United Sikkim in the I-League.

== Career ==
=== United Sikkim ===
After playing for Manang Marshyangdi in Nepal Nuruddin joined Tollygunge Agragami of the I-League 2nd Division and soon also joined Green Valley F.C. also of the I-League 2nd Division. After a stellar 2012 season for Green Valley, Nuruddin joined newly promoted United Sikkim F.C. of the I-League, Earlier during the season Salau scored a hat-trick against United Sikkim during the group phase of the I-League 2nd Division. Nuruddin then made his debut for United Sikkim on 24 September 2012 against Prayag United S.C. in the last match of United Sikkim's 2012 Indian Federation Cup run in which they lost the first two matches and in which Salau could not play in due to paper work he needed to fill out.
