= Jeh Williamson =

Indian footballer (born 1990)

Personal information
- Date of birth: 15 December 1990 (age 35)
- Place of birth: Kolkata, India
- Height: 1.80 m (5 ft 11 in)
- Position: Striker

Team information
- Current team: Bhawanipore
- Number: 19

Youth career
- 2009–2010: Calcutta Cricket & Football Club
- 2010–2011: Pune

Senior career*
Years	Team	Apps	(Gls)
2011–2012	Pune	2	(0)
2012–2013	Bhawanipore	0	(0)
2013–	United Sikkim	0	(0)
- * Club domestic league appearances and goals

Jeh Williamson (born 15 December 1990) is an Indian footballer who currently plays for Bhawanipore in the I-League 2nd Division. He is an official youth product of Pune.

Williamson's love for football developed thanks to his father, Jerome, who began to personally train Williamson at the age of sixteen. However, Williamson's football career can actually be traced back to his school days, which included leading the side as well.

Williamson's interest, coupled with having an equally determined father, led to the creation of the football club Morning Glory, in 2004. The amateur club provided a platform for Williamson to showcase his talent.

His fascination with goals was a good enough reason for Williamson to stay put as a striker.

== Early career ==
In 2007, Williamson had his first trial with playing organised football by enrolling in a youth training program with the Southern Sports Association. It was a six-month regular exercise for the player.

His potential at SSA earned him a break at FCI, where he spent a season under former Internationals Bikash Panji, Atanu Bhattacharya, and Biswajeet Bhattacharya.

The following year, in 2009, Williamson was selected to play for the Calcutta Cricket & Football Club (CCFC). This part of his career was crucial as the club, which was coached by Jamshed Nassiri, played weekend games against big clubs from Kolkata. His promise led to the coach allowing Williamson to try out for the Pune F.C. under-19 team. Williamson made it to the team.

== Career ==
=== Pune ===
In the summer of 2011, Williamson signed with the senior team at Pune F.C., and made his first-team debut against Prayag United S.C. in the I-League, coming off the bench as a substitute in the 71st minute on 5 November 2011.

== Career statistics ==
=== Club ===
Statistics accurate as of 6 November 2011

Club	Season	League			Cup			AFC			Total		
Club	Season	Apps	Goals	Assists	Apps	Goals	Assists	Apps	Goals	Assists	Apps	Goals	Assists
Pune	2011–12	1	0	0	0	0	0	—	—	—	1	0	0
Career total		1	0	0	0	0	0	0	0	0	1	0	0
