= Gift Raikhan =

Indian football manager and former footballer

Personal information
- Date of birth: 25 May 1981 (age 45)
- Place of birth: Mapao Zingtun, Manipur, India
- Date of death: 22 June 2026 (aged 45)
- Height: 5 ft 4 in (1.63 m)
- Position: Left back

Senior career*
Years	Team	Apps	(Gls)
1999–2000	Bengal Mumbai	24	(2)
2000–2002	Churchill Brothers	52	(6)
2002–2004	HAL	46	(4)
2004–2006	Indian Bank	54	(4)
2005–2006	→ Vasco (loan)	24	(4)
2006-2007	→ BEML (loan)	28	(4)
2007-2008	Pune	26	(5)

Managerial career
- 2015–2018: NEROCA
- 2018–2019: Aizawl
- 2019-2020: Gokulam Kerala (technical director)
- 2020-: NEROCA
- * Club domestic league appearances and goals

Gift Raikhan (born 25 May 1981) was an Indian football coach and a former player who played as a left-back. He also managed Manipur football team in Santosh Trophy. He died on 22 June 2026, at the age of 45.

== Playing career ==
During a playing career which spanned six seasons, Raikhan played for BMFC, Churchill Brothers, HAL, Indian Bank, Vasco, BEML, and Pune. He even played in the I-League.

His favorite moment of his career was during the 2000 Rovers Cup when he scored for BMFC against Churchill Brothers which helped secure his move to the club.

== Coaching career ==
After retiring in 2007, Raikhan joined the Youth System at Pune. From 2008 to 2010 Raikhan was assistant to Norbert Gonsalvez in coaching the u17 and u15 teams. In 2011, he was promoted to head coach of the Pune F.C. Academy U20 side and in 2012 led the team to a championship by finishing first in the 2012 I-League U20.

In September 2013, it was confirmed that Raikhan had been promoted to the first-team at Pune F.C. as the assistant to new head coach Mike Snoei.

In June 2018, Aizawl F.C. announced the signing of Raikhan from NEROCA F.C. as head coach for 2018–19 I-League.

== Managerial statistics ==
As of 8 December 2018.

Team	From	To	Record				
Team	From	To	G	W	D	L	Win %
(India) NEROCA FC	2015	2018	34	20	8	6	58.82
(India) Aizawl	2018	2019	11	2	3	6	18.18
(India) NEROCA FC	2019	2021	16	5	3	8	31.25
(India) NEROCA FC	2026	2027	5	1	1	3	20.00
Total			66	28	15	23	42.42

== Honours ==
=== Managerial ===
NEROCA

- I-League 2nd Division: 2016–17
- I-League runner-up: 2017–18

Individual

1. I-League Best Coach (Syed Abdul Rahim Award): 2017–18
