= Tae Yoon =

South Korean footballer (born 1992)

Personal information
- Date of birth: 14 February 1992 (age 34)
- Place of birth: South Korea
- Height: 1.85 m (6 ft 1 in)
- Position: Goalkeeper

Team information
- Current team: Carlos A. Mannucci

Youth career
- 2004–2006: Seil Middle School
- 2007: Vissel Kobe
- 2008–2010: Staines Town
- 2011: Sertanense

Senior career*
| Years | Team | Apps | (Gls) |
| 2012–2013 | United Sikkim | 8 | (0) |
| 2015– | Carlos A. Mannucci | 0 | (0) |
- * Club domestic league appearances and goals

- Tae Yoon
- Hangul: 태윤
- RR: Tae Yun
- MR: T'ae Yun

Tae Yoon (born 14 February 1992) is a South Korean footballer who currently plays as a goalkeeper for Carlos A. Mannucci in the Peruvian Segunda División. Besides South Korea, he has played in England, Portugal, India, and Peru.

== Career ==
=== United Sikkim ===
Tae signed for United Sikkim F.C. on 5 August 2012 officially and made his debut for United Sikkim on 6 October 2012 against Salgaocar F.C. at the Paljor Stadium in the first round of the I-League and United SIkkim's first match ever in the I-League; United Sikkim won the match 3–2.

On 17 January 2013, it was announced that Tae had left United Sikkim after compensation for his contract had been paid. It was also said by Tae that now he would trial with some clubs in the Segunda Division in Spain.

=== Peru ===
After going more than two years without a club, on 31 March 2015 it was announced that Tae had signed with Peruvian Segunda División side Carlos A. Mannucci.

== Career statistics ==
=== Club ===
Statistics accurate as of 17 January 2013

| Club | Season | League | | Federation Cup | | Durand Cup | | AFC | | Total | |
| Club | Season | Apps | CS | Apps | CS | Apps | CS | Apps | CS | Apps | CS |
|---|---|---|---|---|---|---|---|---|---|---|---|
| United Sikkim | 2012–13 | 8 | 0 | 0 | 0 | 0 | 0 | — | — | 8 | 0 |
| Career total | | 8 | 0 | 0 | 0 | 0 | 0 | 0 | 0 | 8 | 0 |
