= Mumtaz Akhtar =

Indian footballer (born 1988)

Personal information
- Date of birth: 8 December 1988 (age 37)
- Place of birth: Malerkotla, Punjab, India
- Height: 1.65 m (5 ft 5 in)
- Position: Central midfielder

Team information
- Current team: Pune
- Number: 23

Youth career
- Mahilpur FA
- 2004–2008: Tata FA
- 2008–2010: East Bengal

Senior career*
| Years | Team | Apps | (Gls) |
| 2010–2011 | Mohammedan | | |
| 2011–2012 | United Sikkim | | |
| 2013–2015 | Pune | 35 | (0) |
| 2015– | Mohammedan | | |
- * Club domestic league appearances and goals as of 15:58, 17 May 2015 (UTC)

Mumtaz Akhtar (born 8 December 1988) is an Indian professional footballer who plays as a central midfielder for Pune in the I-League.

== Career statistics ==
As of 17 May 2015

| Club | Season | League | | | Federation Cup | | Durand Cup | | AFC | | Total | |
| Club | Season | Division | Apps | Goals | Apps | Goals | Apps | Goals | Apps | Goals | Apps | Goals |
|---|---|---|---|---|---|---|---|---|---|---|---|---|
| Pune | 2012–13 | I-League | 15 | 0 | 3 | 0 | 2 | 0 | — | — | 20 | 0 |
| Pune | 2013–14 | I-League | 16 | 0 | 1 | 0 | 0 | 0 | 3 | 0 | 20 | 0 |
| Pune | 2014–15 | I-League | 4 | 0 | 0 | 0 | 0 | 0 | — | — | 4 | 0 |
| Career total | | | 35 | 0 | 4 | 0 | 2 | 0 | 1 | 0 | 44 | 0 |
