= Karma Tsewang =

Tibetan footballer

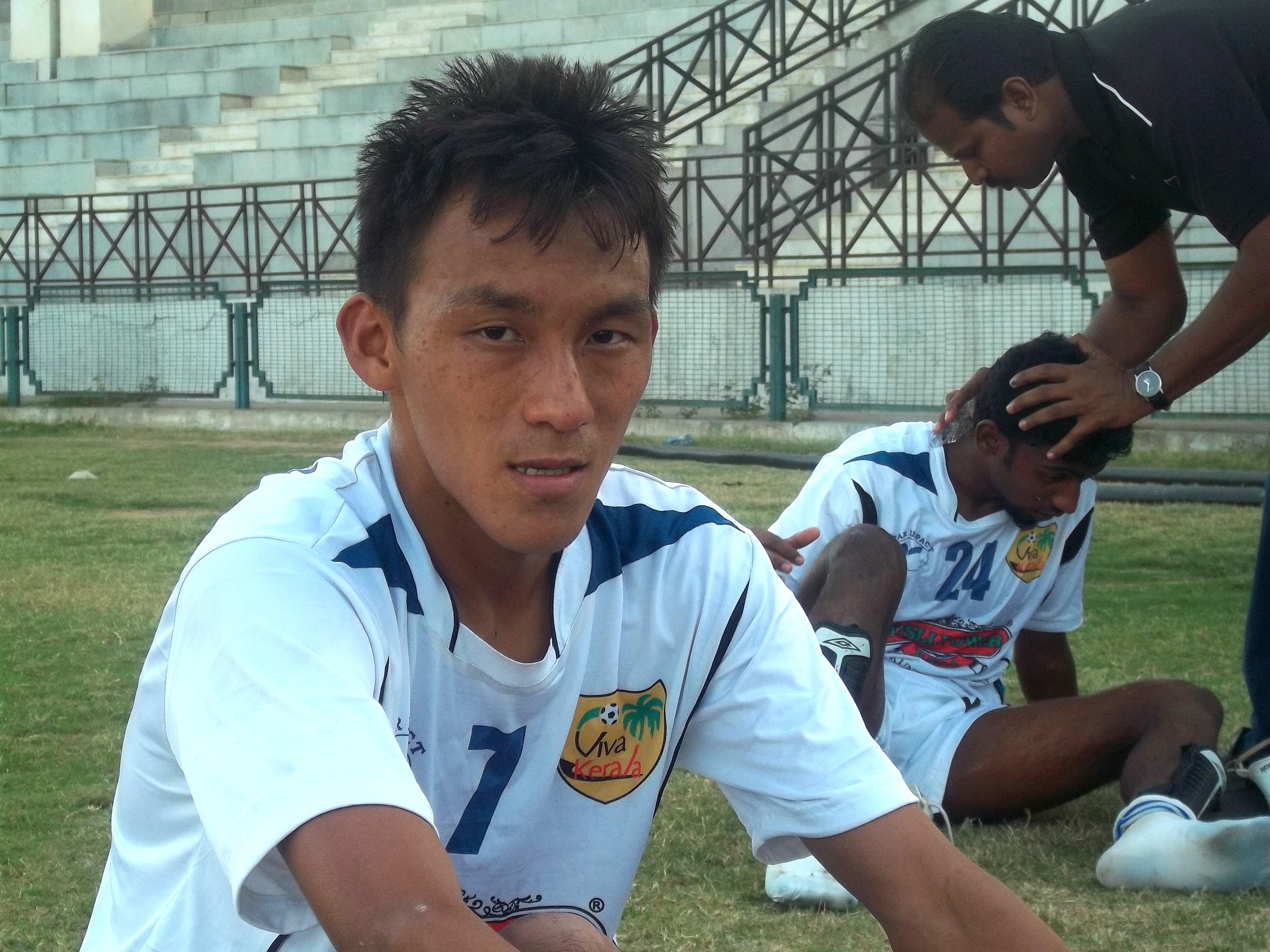
- Tsewang with Viva Kerala in 2011

Personal information
- Full name: Karma Tsewang
- Date of birth: 1 October 1988 (age 38)
- Place of birth: Kollegal, Karnataka, India
- Height: 1.73 m (5 ft 8 in)
- Position: Midfielder

Team information
- Current team: Salgaocar

Senior career*
Years	Team	Apps	(Gls)
2010–2011	Viva Kerala	18	(5)
2011–2013	Pune	46	(3)
2013–2015	Salgaocar	19	(1)
2015–2017	Gangtok Himalayan		

International career^{‡}
2013	Tibet	4	(1)
- * Club domestic league appearances and goals as of 30 May 2015 ‡ National team caps and goals as of 2 June 2018

Karma Tsewang (born 1 October 1988) is a retired professional footballer who played as a midfielder. He last played club football for Gangtok Himalayan. Born in India, he played for the Tibet national team.

== Career ==
=== Viva Kerala ===
Karma Tsewang has three brothers and four sisters. He was admitted to Viva Kerala (later known as Chirag United Club Kerala) after being noticed by a scout in 2008. He played mostly as a right winger for two seasons. He also has history playing across the midfield as a central midfielder or on either of the wings.

=== Pune ===
Karma Tsewang signed for Pune FC at the start of the 2011–12 I-League season. He soon broke into the first team and made the right wing his own displaying some spectacular performances throughout the season.

=== Salgaocar ===
Tsewang made his debut for Salgaocar in the I-League on 21 September 2013 against reigning champions Churchill Brothers at the Duler Stadium in which he came on as a substitute for Claude Gnakpa in 59th minute; as Salgaocar drew the match 1–1.

=== Cholsum Fc ===
Karma signed his first semi-professional contract with Cholsum Fc on July 14 2019 with help of agent Tapa. He made an immediate impact, demonstrating his technical prowess, vision on the field, and ability to score crucial goals. His performances earned him a reputation as one of the top player in the Tibetan footballing world. Throughout his year at Cholsum Fc, Karma amassed 108 appearances and scored 59 goals and 41 assist for the club. He received several individual accolades and help Cholsum Fc win several titles.

== Career statistics ==
As of 30 May 2015

Club	Season	League †			Cup ‡			International *			Total		
Club	Season	Apps	Goals	Assists	Apps	Goals	Assists	Apps	Goals	Assists	Apps	Goals	Assists
Viva Kerala	2010–11	18	5	0	1	0	0	-	-	-	19	5	0
Pune	2011–12	20	1	0	0	0	0	-	-	-	20	1	0
Pune	2012–13	23	2	0	3	0	0	-	-	-	26	2	0
Salgaocar	2013–14	14	1	0	0	0	0	-	-	-	14	1	0
Salgaocar	2014–15	5	0	0	0	0	0	–	–	–	5	0	0
Career total		80	9	0	4	0	0	0	0	0	84	9	0
