= Emmanuel Okoro =

Nigerian footballer (born 2006)

Personal information
- Full name: Emmanuel Onoriode Okoro
- Date of birth: 25 December 2006 (age 19)
- Place of birth: Badagry, Nigeria
- Height: 1.80 m (5 ft 11 in)
- Position: Forward

Team information
- Current team: Corvinul Hunedoara
- Number: 29

Youth career
- –2024: Schimchi Football Academy
- 2024–2025: Ojodu City
- 2025: → Zagorec Krapina (loan)

Senior career*
| Years | Team | Apps | (Gls) |
| 2025–2026 | CFR Cluj | 0 | (0) |
| 2025–2026 | → Corvinul Hunedoara (loan) | 10 | (2) |
| 2026– | Corvinul Hunedoara | 1 | (0) |
- * Club domestic league appearances and goals as of 15 September 2026

Emmanuel Onoriode Okoro (born 25 December 2006) is a Nigerian professional footballer who plays as a forward for Liga I club Corvinul Hunedoara.

== Honours ==
=== Corvinul Hunedoara ===
- Liga II: 2025–26
