= Michael Rodríguez (footballer) =

Costa Rican footballer (born 1981)

Personal information
- Full name: Míchael Steven Rodríguez Gutiérrez
- Date of birth: 30 December 1981 (age 44)
- Place of birth: El Cacao, Costa Rica
- Height: 1.74 m (5 ft 9 in)
- Position: Centre back

Senior career*
Years	Team	Apps	(Gls)
2001–2008	Alajuelense	84	(0)
2003–2004	→ Ramonense (loan)		
2008	Seattle Sounders	15	(0)
2009	Brujas	11	(0)
2010–2011	Pérez Zeledón	38	(3)
2011–2012	Herediano	7	(0)
2012–2013	United Sikkim	15	(0)
2013–2014	Pérez Zeledón	23	(2)
2014	Puerto Rico Bayamón	0	(0)
Total		193	(5)

International career
2006	Costa Rica	3	(0)
- * Club domestic league appearances and goals

Michael Steven Rodríguez Gutiérrez (born 30 December 1981) is a Costa Rican former footballer who most recently played for the National Premier Soccer League club Puerto Rico Bayamón.

== Club career ==
Until recently, Rodríguez played club football for Alajuelense.

In June 2008, he signed with the Seattle Sounders of the USL First Division in the United States. He currently has not played for the club, as he is awaiting his P1 Visa.

On 24 June, Rodríguez made his debut for the Sounders in a match against Hollywood United F.C. in the 2008 Lamar Hunt U.S. Open Cup. In January 2010 he joined Pérez Zeledón.

In October 2012, Rodríguez moved abroad to play for Indian outfit United Sikkim but he returned in June 2013 to play for Pérez Zeledón. In September 2014 he was denied a work permit by the United States to play for Puerto Rican side Puerto Rico Bayamón after playing for them in the CONCACAF Champions League.

== International career ==
Rodríguez played at the 2001 FIFA World Youth Championship held in Argentina. He was also named in the Costa Rican squad that competed in the football tournament at the 2004 Summer Olympics. Rodríguez made his senior debut for Costa Rica in a February 2006 friendly match against South Korea and earned a total of 3 caps, scoring no goals. He also represented his country in the 2006 FIFA World Cup, although he did not see any playing time during the tournament.

His final international was a May 2006 World Cup warm-up match against Ukraine.
