= Chika Wali =

Nigerian footballer (born 1990)

Personal information
- Full name: Chika Wali
- Date of birth: 10 August 1990 (age 36)
- Place of birth: River State, Nigeria
- Height: 1.88 m (6 ft 2 in)
- Position: Centre back

Senior career*
Years	Team	Apps	(Gls)
- Pune
- United SC
2011–2013	Pune	42	(2)
2013–2014	Salgaocar	24	(0)
2014– 2014	Tuff Laxmi Prasad	16	(3)
2014–2015	Mumbai	20	(0)
2015–2016	Dempo	10	(0)
2016–2019	Ozone FC	25	(1)
- * Club domestic league appearances and goals

Chika Wali is a Nigerian football player who last played as a centre back for Ozone in the I-League 2nd Division.

== Career ==
=== Early career ===
From the grounds of River State in Nigeria to Pune, this solidly built Nigerian has come some distance in every sense of the phrase. Chika started playing the game when he was eight beginning with school games and all school tournaments. He was then picked to play for his state where he used to play as a defensive midfielder. Incidentally, Chika, in his early days wanted to be a striker – he loved scoring goals – but a coach said that he would go much further in the game if he played back considering his height and physique. Later a scout spotted him and got him a contract to play for a club in the neighboring country of Benin, a two hours drive from Chika's place in Nigeria. He spent a season there – his first as a professional in the game.

=== Pune ===
He came to India as a teenager on the invitation of Pune after a close friend of Chika introduced him to Nigel Empson, a manager in India, who then brought him to the notice of Pune FC leading to his present contract. This is his sixth year in India as a pro.

Wali has been a key part of the PFC team which won promotion to the I-League, and has gone on to establish itself as a major force in Indian football, finishing second in the I-League in season 2012–13(Reference?). Wali has shown character and dedication in his career at PFC.

=== Ozone FC ===
On 26 October 2017 Ozone announced the signing of chicka wali for their upcoming I-League 2nd Division campaign. He made his debut for the club in their first group stage match of 2016–17 I-League 2nd Division against Kenkre. However, the club failed to progress to the final round of the league and finished third in their group.
