= Sukhwinder Singh (footballer, born 1983) =

Indian footballer

Personal information
- Full name: Sukhwinder Singh
- Date of birth: 12 March 1983 (age 43)
- Place of birth: Nawanshahr, Punjab, India
- Height: 1.80 m (5 ft 11 in)
- Position: Midfielder

Team information
- Current team: Mohammedan
- Number: 15

Youth career
- 2003–2007: JCT

Senior career*
Years	Team	Apps	(Gls)
2003–2007	JCT	45	(12)
2007–2010	Mahindra United	55	(14)
2011–2012	Chirag United Kerala	18	(5)
2012–2013	Pune F.C	15	(3)
2014–2015	East Bengal	18	(4)
2014–2015	Chennaiyin FC (loan)	0	(0)
2015–2016	Minerva Punjab F.C	12	(6)
2018–	Mohammedan	0	(0)

International career
- India
- * Club domestic league appearances and goals as of 20 May 2015

Sukhwinder Singh (born 12 March 1983) is an Indian professional footballer who played as a midfielder for Mohammedan in the I-League 2nd Division.

== Career ==
Born in Nawanshahr, Punjab, Sukhwinder started his football journey with Mahilpur Football Club before joining the Academy of JCT^{[1]} before being promoted to their senior team .^{[1]} He scored his first professional goal for the club on 2006 against Mahindra United in the 64th minute to help JCT to a huge 7–1 victory.^{[3]} He then scored his second goal for the club on 11 October 2007 against Mohammedan in the 45th minute to help JCT to a 2–0 win.^{[4]} He had a productive Durand Cup campaign in his debut season, where JCT reached the semi-finals, with Sukhwinder scoring thrice during the tournament.
