= Derrick Pereira =

Indian footballer manager (born 1962)

Personal information
- Date of birth: 17 March 1962 (age 64)
- Place of birth: Caranzalem, Goa, India
- Position: Defender

Senior career*
Years	Team	Apps	(Gls)
1980–1983	Salgaocar	108	(6)
1983–1984	Tata Football Academy	112	(8)
1986–1999	Salgaocar	440	(56)
Total		660	(70)

International career
1984–1991	India	48	(4)

Managerial career
- 2000–2005: Vasco
- 2005–2009: Mahindra United
- 2009–2013: Pune
- 2013–2015: Salgaocar
- 2015–2016: DSK Shivajians
- 2016-2017: Churchill Brothers
- 2017-2018: FC Goa Reserves
- 2017–2018: FC Goa (assistant)
- 2018: FC Goa (interim)
- 2018-2019: FC Goa
- 2019–2021: India U23
- 2021–2025: FC Goa (technical director)
- 2025–: Gokulam Kerala (technical director)
- * Club domestic league appearances and goals

Derrick Pereira (born 17 March 1962) is an Indian association football manager and former player, who is currently sporting director for I-League club Gokulam Kerala.

== Playing career ==
Pereira's story began in the late 1970s when he started playing for local Goa clubs as a Child (Antao Brothers). His first move to a top club was with Salgaocar SC in 1980 where he stayed on till 1983. Later he moved on to Tata Football Academy and then back to Salgaocar SC in 1985. He stayed on at Salgaocar till the end of his career in 1999. Amongst the highlights of his career were leading Goa to victory in the 1980 Junior National Championship. Another highlight was leading Salgaocar to a win in the 1990 Rovers Cup which the team won after downing Dempo SC in the final. He was also part of the senior India side from 1984 to 1991. He was also the part of national team which features in 1984 AFC Asian Cup.

== Coaching career ==
Pereira's coaching career began when he began coaching Salgaocar U-19. That was a job which he held for two seasons. Next came coaching the first team at Vasco SC which he did for five seasons till 2005. Another prominent assignment was coaching Mahindra United from 2005 to 2009. Then in June 2009 he signed on with Pune FC, where he has now managed for two seasons, leading them to top-five finishes in each season.

At the start of 2013–14 I-League campaign, Salgaocar replaced David Booth with Pereira. Salgaocar started the season brightly and at one time led the table for six game-weeks, but a rough patch of eight games, which included 4 straight losses, derailed their campaign and saw them lose the title to Bengaluru FC. Salgaocar finished their campaign at third place, which was a marked improvement over their past two campaign finishes. In February 2017, he signed with Churchill Brothers, mid-way through the season after the team stood last in the table.

In April 2017, he signed with FC Goa as the head of youth development and assistant manager of the first team. On 5 June 2018, he was promoted as the technical director of the club and Jesús Tato replaced him as the assistant manager of FC Goa.

On 21 December 2021, Pereira was appointed as the head coach of FC Goa.

== Honours ==
=== As manager ===
Mahindra United

- National Football League: 2005–06
- Federation Cup (India): 2005
- IFA Shield: 2006, 2008

Individual

- IndianFootball.com Awards —Coach of the Year: 2003
