= Satindra Mohan Dev Stadium =

Multi-purpose sports stadium in Silchar, Assam, India

Coordinates: 24°49′47.12″N 92°47′55.91″E

- Interactive map of Satindra Mohan Dev Stadium

Ground information
- Location: Silchar, Assam
- Establishment: TBA
- Capacity: 30,000
- Owner: District Sports Association, Silchar
- Tenants: Assam cricket team
- End names
- n/a n/a

International information
- Only women's ODI: 7 December 2005: India v England

Team information
Assam cricket team
- As of 8 December 2019; Source: Cricketarchive

Satindra Mohan Dev Stadium is a multi-purpose stadium situated at Silchar, Assam. It was earlier known as the District Sports Association Stadium. After extensive upgrade of facilities, it was renamed after the father of former MP Santosh Mohan Dev. The stadium is used for football and cricket and has a capacity of around 30,000. It has hosted a women's one day international match between Indian and the England women's teams. It has also hosted Ranji Trophy and Duleep Trophy matches. The floodlights were installed by Bharat Heavy Electrical Limited in 2008. In 2009, cluster matches of Federation Cup Football Tournament were held in this stadium.

== One-day international matches ==
This is a list of women's ODI matches hosted at this stadium.

S No	Team (A)	Team (B)	Winner	Margin	Year
1	India	England	India	By 10 wickets	2005
