= Douhou Pierre =

Ivorian footballer (born 1987)

Personal information
- Full name: Douhou Sey Djidja Pierre
- Date of birth: 21 December 1987 (age 38)
- Place of birth: Abidjan, Ivory Coast
- Height: 1.75 m (5 ft 9 in)
- Position: Attacking midfielder

Team information
- Current team: DSK Shivajians
- Number: 10

Youth career
- JMG Academy
- True Sport Arsenal

Senior career*
Years	Team	Apps	(Gls)
2007	Hoàng Anh Gia Lai		
2007–2009	Mahindra United		
2009–2014	Pune	49	(13)
2014–2016	Salgaocar	20	(6)
2016–2017	DSK Shivajians	13	(4)
- * Club domestic league appearances and goals as of 17:41, 6 April 2016 (UTC)

Douhou Sey Djidja Pierre (born 21 December 1987) is an Ivorian professional footballer who last played as an attacking midfielder for DSK Shivajians in the I-League.

== Career ==
=== Early career ===
Born in Abidjan, Douhou started his career at the JMG Academy which was founded by former France international Jean-Marc Guillou. While at the academy, Douhou played with future Ivorian internationals, such as Emmanuel Eboué and Salomon Kalou. He then went off to Thailand and Vietnam to train at those branches of the JMG Academy, where he then went on to play for True Sport Arsenal CF in Thailand.

Douhou's professional career began in 2007, when he signed for Hoàng Anh Gia Lai of the V.League 1, where he stayed for six months before signing for Mahindra United in the I-League of India.

=== Pune ===
In 2009, Douhou signed for Pune in the I-League. After playing for the club in the 2009–10 season, Douhou left football for a season. He returned to the club on 13 September 2011. At the end of the 2011–12 I-League season, Douhou was voted "Pune FC Player of The Year".

=== Salgaocar ===
On 9 May 2014, Douhou signed for Salgaocar, after spending five years with Pune.

== Honours ==
Mahindra United

- Durand Cup: 2008

Individual

- Pune FC Player of The Year: 2011–12
