= Pune FC =

Former Indian professional association football club

Pune
- Full name: Pune Football Club
- Nickname: Red Lizards
- Short name: PFC
- Founded: 21 July 2007; 19 years ago
- Dissolved: 2016; 10 years ago
- Ground: Balewadi Stadium; Pune, Maharashtra
- Capacity: 10,900
- Owner: Ashok Piramal Group
- Website: punefc.com
Home colours	Away colours	Third colours

Pune Football Club was an Indian professional football club based in Pune, Maharashtra. The club competed in I-League, then top flight of Indian football league system. The club was one of the most professional clubs in Indian football history, known mainly for their focus on fanfare, professional playing set-up, and focus on youth development. Pune was owned by Ashok Piramal Group.

Founded in 2007, the club was accepted into the I-League in 2009. In their first season in the I-League, the club managed to finish in a surprising third place before having their best ever season during the 2012–13 season in which they finished in second place.

Pune formerly participated in Chennai Football League. The club used to have a rivalry with fellow Maharashtra club Mumbai FC, with whom it contested the "Maha derby". The club was nicknamed "red lizards". They pulled out of I-League earlier 2015–16 season. The main club shut down its operations while Pune F.C. Academy was acquired by ISL club, FC Pune City. It was dissolved in 2016.

== History ==
=== Foundation ===
In 2007, Indian football was in the process of a renovation, mainly with the start of the I-League replacing the old National Football League. However, despite this, the All India Football Federation still had trouble attracting investors to create new clubs, specially outside of West Bengal, Goa, and North East India due to the fact that, despite a good number of fans in these areas and good wages to players, the clubs in these regions still had trouble creating any profit.

Ashok Piramal Group, a company based in Maharashtra, however did the opposite. Despite the city of Pune not having much history when it comes to football or much support for the sport, which is overshadowed by cricket, Ashok Piramal Group still created Pune Football Club in 2007. In creating the club they created one of the first clubs in India named after the city they were playing in and representing. The club also got invitation and participated in TFA Shield tournament, organized by Tamil Nadu Football Association (TFA).

=== I-League 2nd Division (2008–2009) ===
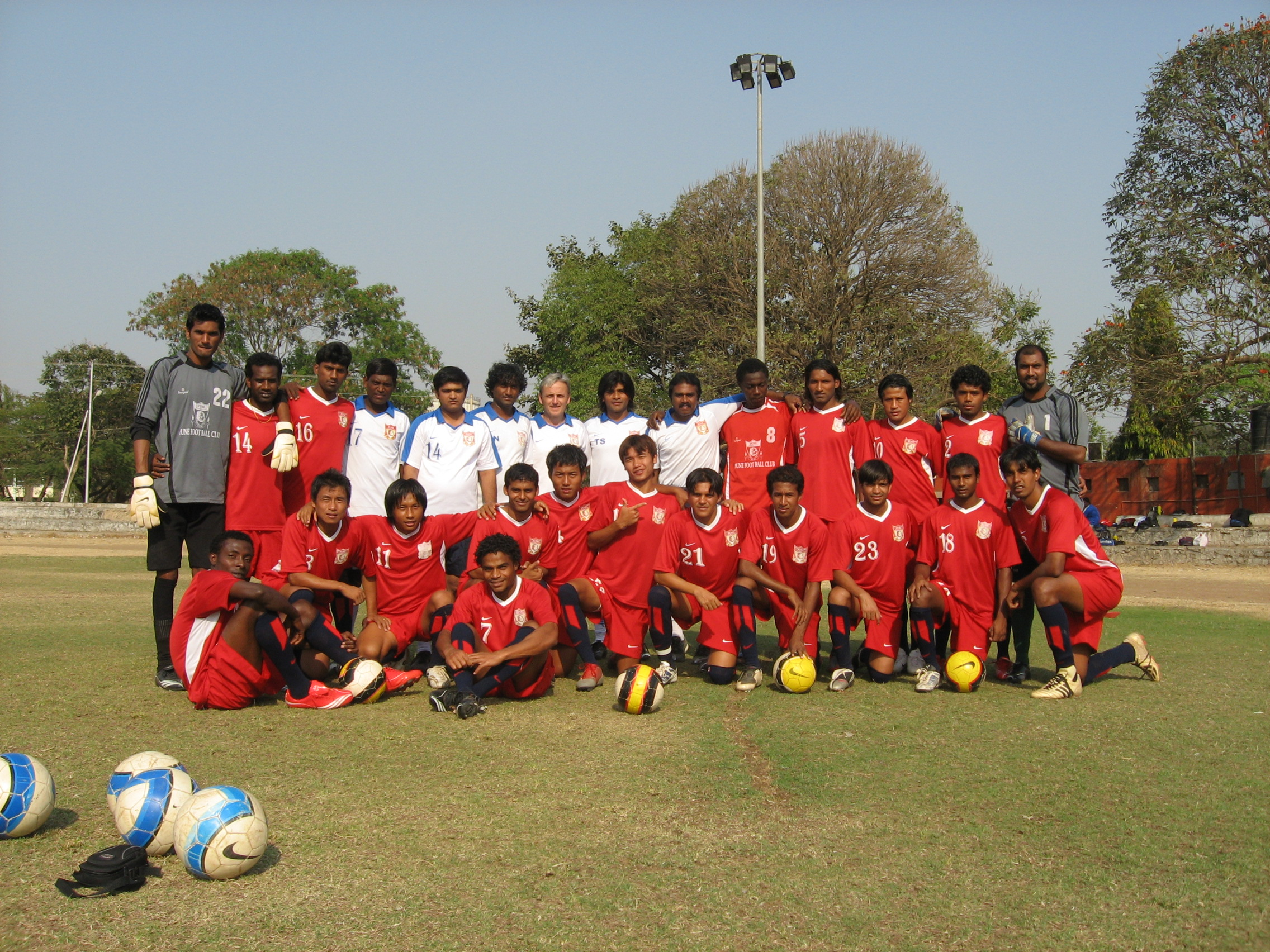
Pune FC players and staff at the practice ground in 2008

In preparation for their first ever season in the I-League 2nd Division, the club signed mainly a bunch of unknown players and also signed on Stewart Hall as the first head coach of the club. The club were grouped in Group A during the 2008 I-League 2nd Division along with Vasco, ONGC, HAL, and Chirag United. Midway through their 2nd Division campaign the club changed coaches, going from Stewart Hall to former Northern Ireland national teamer, Bernard McNally. The club finished in third place in Group A and thus failed to advance further that campaign.

Pune FC took part in Kolhapur All-India Football Championship in 2009, and reached semi-finals. The club then participated in the 2009 I-League 2nd Division, in which four promotional spots were generated because of the expansion of I-League. Before the season began Pune re-hired former coach Stewart Hall to coach the club. Also before the season the club managed to make many changes to the squad. At the end of the season Pune managed to finish in fourth place with a 3–0 victory over SESA Football Academy and thus earn promotion to the I-League for the first time in their history.

=== Early I-League and Derrick Pereira Era (2009–2013) ===
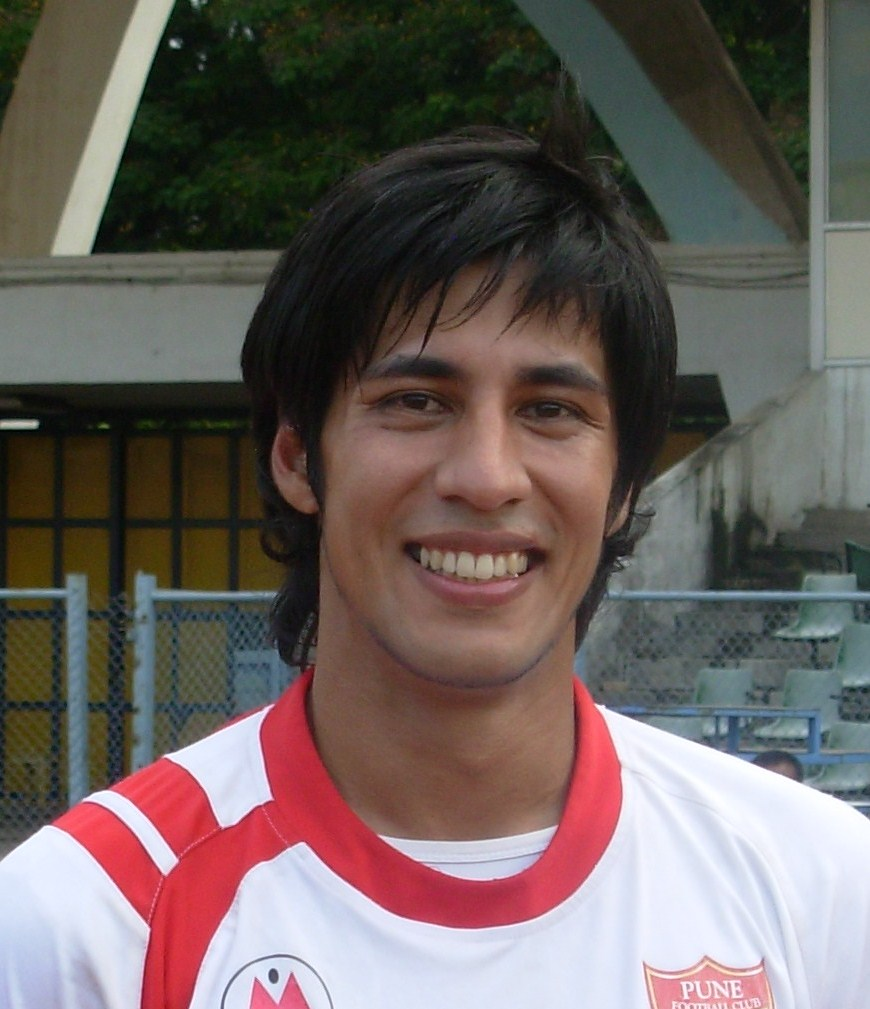
Arata Izumi is the first ever naturalized Indian footballer, who played for both Pune FC and India national team.

Pune Football Club's first season in the I-League was the 2009–10 season. Pune selected the Balewadi Sports Complex in Balewadi, a suburb of Pune, as their home stadium. Before the season began the club made headlines when they signed the current India number 1 goalkeeper, Subrata Pal, from East Bengal and by also signing Japanese midfielder Arata Izumi from Mahindra United. At the same time the club also signed Derrick Pereira to be the head coach of the team after Stewart Hall resigned. Before joining Pune, Pereira was head coach at Mahindra United where he had won the National Football League and the Federation Cup. He also took Mahindra United to the quarter-finals of the AFC Cup in 2007.

Pune played their first I-League match against East Bengal, which was also their first home match in the I-League, on 3 October 2009 in which the final score was 0–0. Pune had no wins, six draws, and two losses in the league before winning their first ever I-League match on 9 January 2010 against JCT 2–1. At the end of the season Pune finished in third place which was called a success by the club due to their weak start in the league.

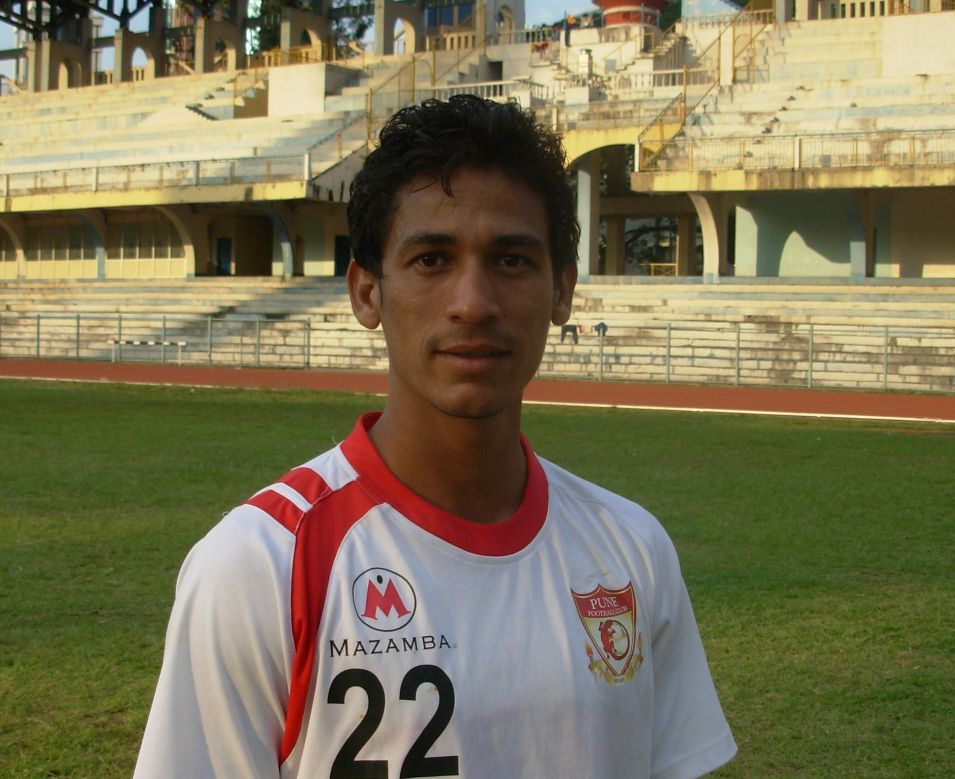
Lester Fernandes in away kit of Pune in 2011

The summer of 2011 was an important time for Pune. On 23 June 2011, it was announced that Pune would start the Pune F.C. Academy team which would make Pune the first team in I-League with an academy team. Then on 25 July 2011 it was announced that Pune's Brazilian striker Edmar Figueira would join the Portuguese top flight Primeira Liga with C.D. Feirense which would be the first-time a player from the I-League would sign for a team in a top 10 European league based on the UEFA coefficient. Then on 26 September 2011 it was announced that Pune would play English Premier League side Blackburn Rovers, who are owned by Indian owners Venky's, in a friendly. Thus making Pune the first ever Indian club to play a friendly against an English Premier League team. The match was then played on 7 October 2011 at the Balewadi Sports Complex in which Pune lost 0–3 to Blackburn. Then on 22 October 2011, it was announced that Pune had tied-up a partnership with IT giant Infosys which would see more promotion of the club through media networks. Then on 11 June 2012, Pune became the first Indian football team to participate in a transfer between another I-League club, Prayag United, when Pune sold midfielder Lester Fernandez to Prayag for ₹20 lakh.

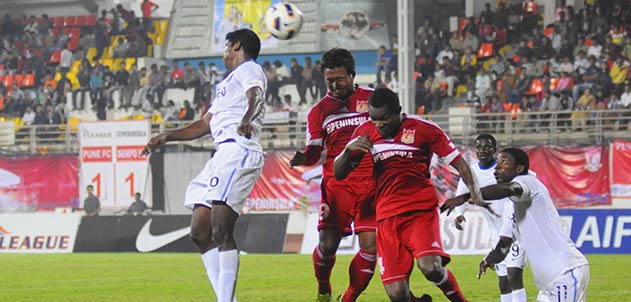
Pune FC players (in red) in action during an I-League match against Dempo, 2012.

The club then finished the 2012–13 season with their best finish yet in the I-League by finishing in 2nd place, just behind Churchill Brothers for the I-League crown.

=== Mike Snoei Era (2013–2014) ===
After the end of 2012–13 season, it was announced that coach Derrick Pereira had resigned as Pune FC coach to return to his former club Salgaocar. Soon enough though Pune were able to sign Pereira's replacement in former Vitesse Arnhem head coach, Dutchman Mike Snoei for the new season. Also, with the new coach, came a new direction for Pune with the director of the club, Nandan Piramal, stating that the club would focus mainly on youth development while also mixing youngsters with a good group of senior players. The club then made new signings in the foreign department by signing Superettan player Calum Angus and former A-League player James Meyer. The club also signed current Equatorial Guinea international, Raúl Fabiani, who also played for his adopted country in the 2012 Africa Cup of Nations.

The first tournament the club took part in was the 2013 Durand Cup in which the club sent a mix of players from the first-team and the Pune F.C. Academy with the three senior players being Caitano Costa, Shahinlal Meloly, and Prakash Thorat. The club however did not make it out of the group stages. Pune then played their first I-League match under Snoei on 21 September 2013 against Mohammedan at the Salt Lake Stadium in which Pune won the match 3–1 thanks to a double from Fabiani and a goal from Meyer. Then, on 29 January 2014, Pune played their first ever international club match when they took on Vietnamese side Hanoi T&T in the 2014 AFC Champions League qualifier first round at the Balewadi Sports Complex. The club however suffered a 3–0 defeat in that match, meaning that they would have to play in the 2014 AFC Cup that season. In 2014 Durand Cup, held from 20 October to 8 November in Goa, Pune lost 1–0 to Salgaocar SC in final and finished as runners-up.

A month later, Pune FC participated in the 2014 Bhutan King's Cup and faced Assam State Electricity Board in their last group stage match. Thongkhosiem Haokip scored a hat-trick as Pune booked their place into the semi-finals with a 5–0 victory. Then they defeated Mohun Bagan AC through penalty-shootout and reached to the final, in which, they lost 1–0 to Bangladeshi outfit Sheikh Jamal Dhanmondi.

== Rivalry ==
Pune FC used to have a rivalry with fellow Maharashtra-based club Mumbai FC, with whom it contested the "Maha derby". Both the teams faced each other in yearly competitions like I-League and MDFA Elite League.

== Disbanding the club ==
Pune FC enjoyed their best ever campaign during the 2012–13 season, in which they became runners-up. Later in May 2015, ahead of the 2015–16 I-League season, the club was dissolved due to financial crisis. Meanwhile, their academy was purchased by the erstwhile ISL side FC Pune City.

On 26 August 2016, it was announced that FC Pune City of the Indian Super League had taken over the Pune FC Academy and will rebrand it under their name.

== Stadium ==
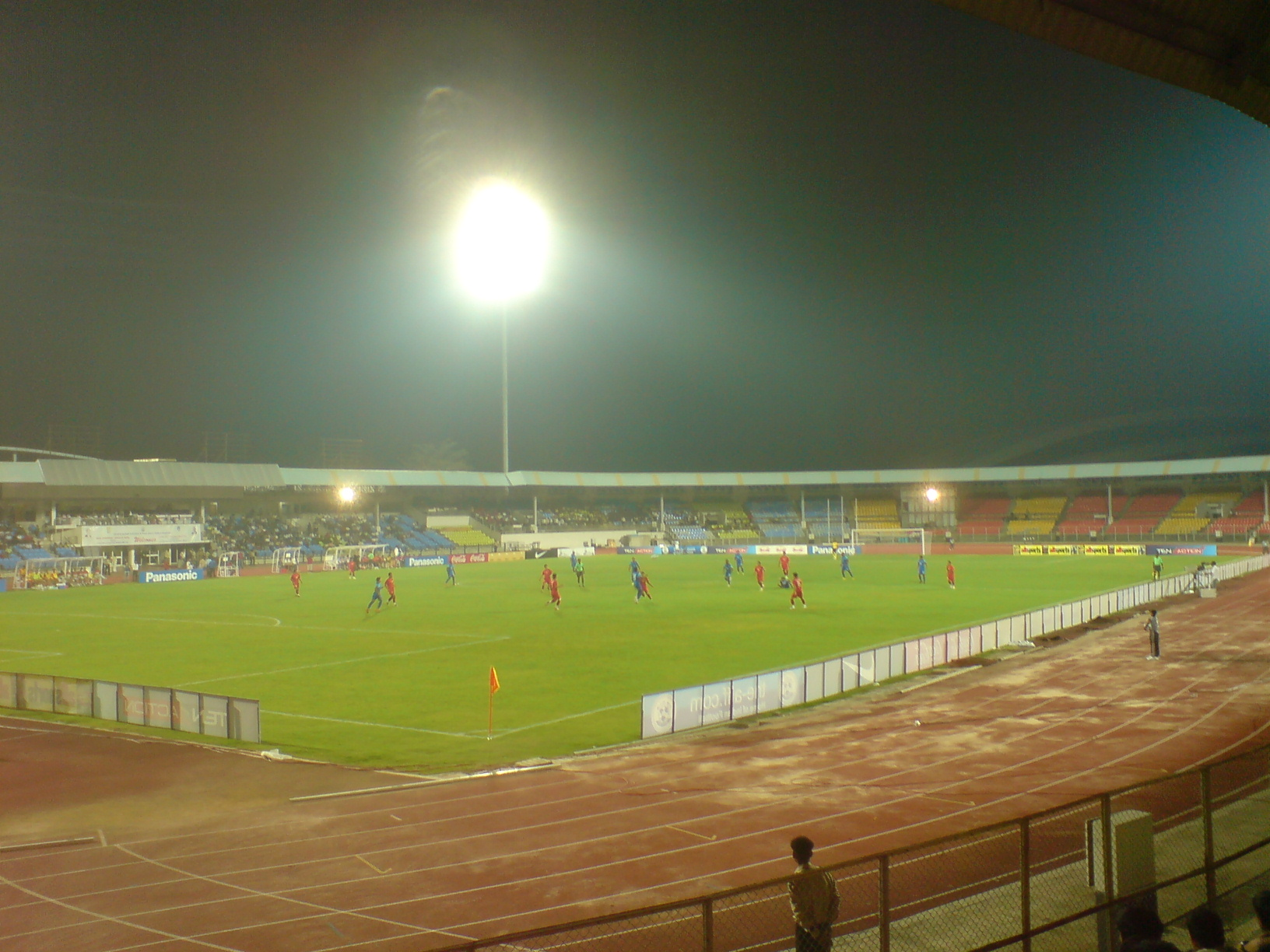
The Balewadi Sports Complex during a match between India and Vietnam on 8 October 2010.

Since Pune made their debut in the I-League, they have always played at the Balewadi Sports Complex, which is located in Balewadi, a suburb of Pune. The stadium was also the site of the 2008 Commonwealth Youth Games. The club also used the stadium as their home ground for continental tournaments like AFC Cup, and AFC Champions League play-offs.

The club also trained on the outskirts of Pune in an area called Mamurdi on their own training ground. For a season, they used St. Vincent's High School football ground for training, which is located in Pune.

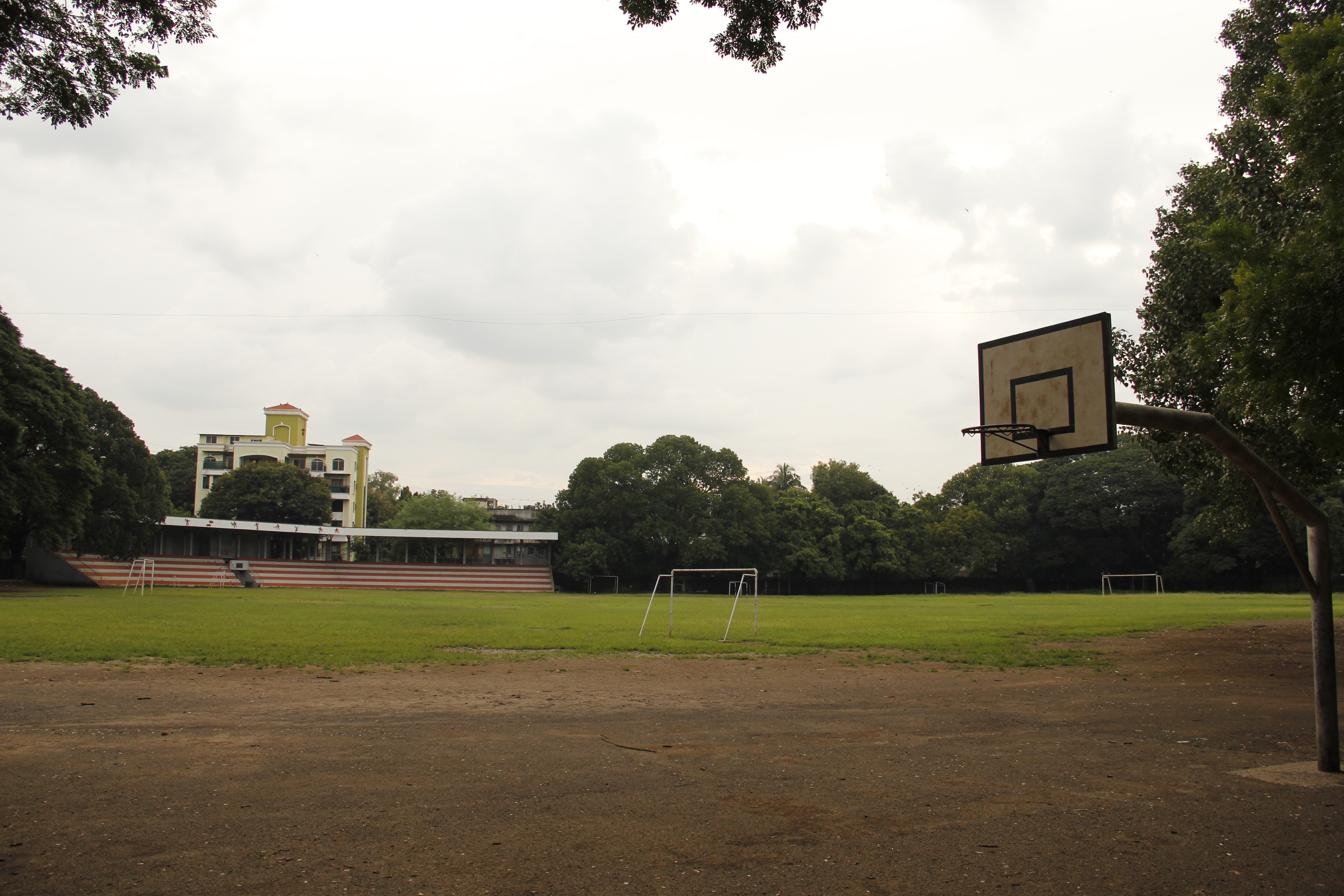
St. Vincent's High School football ground in Pune.

== Ownership ==
Pune FC was owned overall by the Ashok Piramal Group. Peninsula Land Limited CEO Nandan Piramal was last chairman of the club.

== Kit manufacturers and shirt sponsors ==
Period	Kit manufacturer	Shirt sponsor
2007–2015	Adidas	Peninsula
2015–2016	7070 Sports	Peninsula

== Academy & youth ==
Since their inception in 2007, Pune FC operated its U14, U17 and U19 youth teams. Club's U15 and U17 teams were briefly managed by Norbert Gonsalvez and Gift Raikhan between 2008 and 2011.

On 23 June 2011, it was announced that the club would open an academy at the U20 level, thus becoming the first I-League team to do so, and they later competed in U19 I-League. The academy was fully known as Peninsula Pune Football Club Academy (PPFCA), and produced numerous Indian talents. They are also one time runner-up in 2012 edition of Kedari Redekar Football Cup. Clubs 'A' team competed in Pune District Football Association League. In youth football leagues, the club also shared rivalry with Mumbai FC.

== Notable players ==
=== Foreign players ===
This list comprises foreign players who either represented their respective countries in international level before or after playing for Pune FC or played for the club in matches of I-League.

- (Trinidad and Tobago) Cyd Gray (2008)
- (Portugal) Edgar Marcelino (2009–2014)
- (Brazil) Edmar Figueira (2009–2011)
- (Ivory Coast) Douhou Pierre (2009–2014)
- (Senegal) Lamine Tamba (2010–2011)
- (Guinea) Mandjou Keita (2010–2012)
- (Tibet) Karma Tsewang (2011–2013)
- (Australia) James Meyer (2012–2013)
- (Sudan) (South Sudan) James Moga (2012–2013)
- (Japan) Daisuke Nishiguchi (2012–2013)
- (Equatorial Guinea) Raúl Iván Fabiani (2013)
- (Mauritius) Sewram Gobin (2013)
- (Netherlands) Riga Mustapha (2013–2014)
- (England) Calum Angus (2013–2014)
- (Nigeria) Chika Wali (2013–2014)
- (Australia) Mirjan Pavlović (2014)
- (Japan) Ryuji Sueoka (2014–2015)
- (Brazil) Luciano Sabrosa (2014–2015)
- (Montenegro) Darko Nikač (2015)

== Managerial history ==
As of 17 February 2014

Name	Nationality	From	To	P	W	D	L	GF	GA	Win%	Honours
Stewart Hall	England	2008		Unknown							None
Bernard McNally	Northern Ireland	2008		Unknown							None
Stewart Hall	England	2009		9	5	2	2	9	6	55.56	None
Derrick Pereira	India	May 2009	May 2013	104	48	32	24	167	110	46.15	None
Mike Snoei	Netherlands	July 2013	May 2014	19	6	6	7	21	24	31.58	None
Karim Bencherifa	Morocco	July 2014	May 2015	16	6	5	5	21	20	37.50	

=== Last technical staff ===
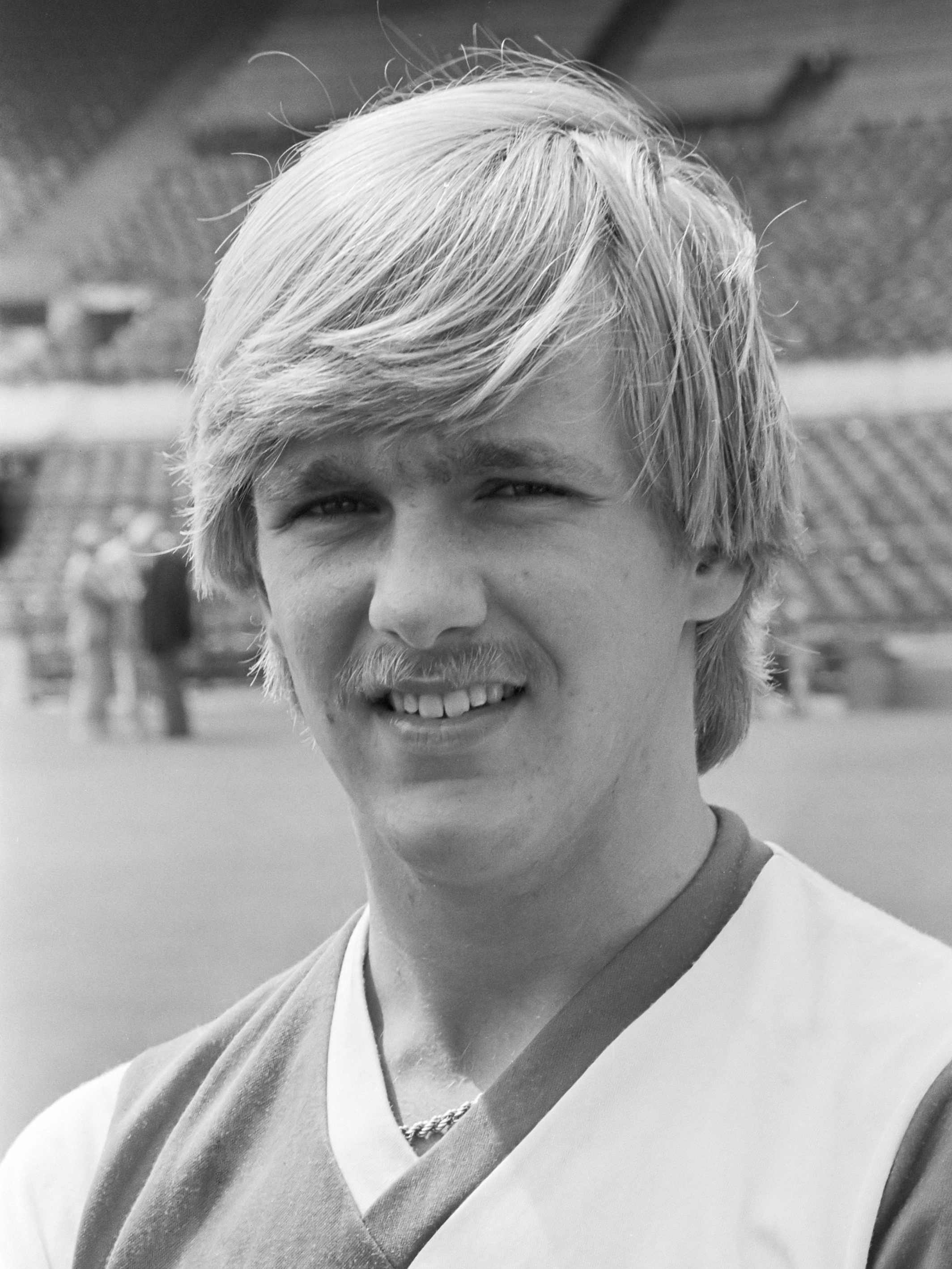
Mike Snoei was the manager of Pune F.C. during the 2013–2014 season.

As of October 2013.

Position	Name
Head coach	(Morocco) Karim Bencherifa
Assistant coach	(India) Gift Raikhan
Physiotherapist	(India) Tariq Shaikh
Fitness coach	(India) Sridhar Krishnamurthy
Kit manager	(India) Prashant Naidu
Academy director	(India) Ranjan Chowdhury
Academy coach	(India) Naushad Moosa

== Club honours ==
=== Domestic ===
- I-League
  - Runners-up (1): 2012–13
  - Third Place (1): 2009–10
- Durand Cup
  - Runners-up (1): 2014
- Kedari Redekar United Cup
  - Champions (1): 2008

=== Invitational ===
- Bhutan King's Cup
  - Runners-up (1): 2014

=== Junior team ===
U17

- Football Challenge Cup Chandigarh
  - Winners (1): 2015

U20

- I-League U20
  - Champions (2): 2012, 2013

== Performance in AFC competitions ==
- AFC Champions League: 1 appearance

2014: Qualifying play-off Round 1

- AFC Cup: 1 appearance

2014: Group Stage

=== Continental record ===
Team	Pld	W	D	L	GF	GA	GD	Pts
(Hong Kong) Kitchee	6	4	1	1	15	5	+10	13
(Myanmar) Nay Pyi Taw	6	2	2	2	10	10	0	8
(Singapore) Tampines Rovers	6	2	0	4	9	16	−7	6 (Note: Tiebreakers: Tampines Rovers and Pune were ranked on head-to-head record.)
(India) Pune	6	1	3	2	12	15	−3	6

== Team records ==
=== Notable wins against foreign teams ===
As of matches played 25 November 2014

Competition	Round	Year	Opposition	Score	Venue	City	Ref
IFA Shield	Group stage	2009	(Senegal) AS Douanes	2–0	Salt Lake Stadium	Kolkata	
AFC Cup	Group stage	2014	(Hong Kong) Kitchee	2–0	Shree Shiv Chhatrapati Sports Complex	Pune	
Jigme Dorji Wangchuk Memorial Gold Cup	Group stage	2014	(Nepal) Manang Marshyangdi	2–1	Changlimithang Stadium	Thimphu	
Jigme Dorji Wangchuk Memorial Gold Cup	Group stage	2014	(Bhutan) Ugyen Academy	1–0	Changlimithang Stadium	Thimphu	
Jigme Dorji Wangchuk Memorial Gold Cup	Group stage	2014	(Bangladesh) Dhaka Abahani	2–0	Changlimithang Stadium	Thimphu	

=== League record ===
Results of league and cup competitions by season
Season	Division	P	W	D	L	F	A	Pts	Pos	Federation Cup	Durand Cup	AFC Cup	Competition	Result	Name	Goals
Season	League									Federation Cup	Durand Cup	AFC Cup	Asia		Top goalscorer	
2008	IL2	5	2	1	2	8	6	7	3rd, Group A	—	—	—	—	—	(Nigeria) Emeka Ogbonna	4
2009	IL2	9	5	2	2	9	6	17	4th	—	—	—	—	—	(India) Jeje Lalpekhlua	3
2009–10	I–League	26	10	12	4	38	23	42	3rd	Group	—	—	—	—	(Brazil) Edmar Figueira	14
2010–11	I–League	26	9	9	8	32	27	36	5th	Group	Group	—	—	—	(Guinea) Mandjou Keita	11
2011–12	I–League	26	13	7	6	44	34	46	5th	Group	Semi-finals	—	—	—	(Guinea) Mandjou Keita	14
2012–13	I–League	26	14	4	6	53	26	52	2nd	Group	Group	—	—	—	(South Sudan) James Moga	16
2013–14	I–League	24	7	8	9	53	26	29	7th	Group	Group	Group	—	—	(Netherlands) Riga Mustapha	7
2014–15	I–League	20	8	5	7	30	28	29	5th	Group	Runners-up	—	—	—	(India) Thongkhosiem Haokip	7

== See also ==
- Pune F.C. Academy
- Football clubs in Maharashtra
- Sports in Maharashtra
- Indian football clubs in Asian competitions
