= 2021–22 RoundGlass Punjab FC season =

Indian football club season

Punjab
2021–22 season
- Owner: RoundGlass Sports Pvt Ltd
- Director of football: Nikolaos Topoliatis
- Head coach: Ashley Westwood
- Stadium: Tau Devi Lal Stadium (I-League)
Home colours	Away colours

The 2019–20 Punjab F.C. Season was the club's Sixth season in the I-League.

== Current squad ==
Note: Flags indicate national team as defined under FIFA eligibility rules; some limited exceptions apply. Players may hold more than one non-FIFA nationality.

No.	Pos.	Nation	Player
3	DF	IND	Saurabh Bhanwala
6	MF	IND	Bikramjit Singh (Captain)
10	MF	ESP	Joseba Beitia
12	FW	IND	Rupert Nongrum
13	DF	IND	Bikash Yumnam
17	MF	IND	Telem Suranjit Singh
19	DF	IND	Denzil Kharshandi
21	GK	IND	Jaspreet Singh
27	DF	IND	Aakash Sangwan
29	MF	IND	Ashangbam Aphaoba Singh
31	DF	IND	Ashray Bhardwaj
32	DF	IND	Abhishek Verma
33	FW	IND	Sumeet Passi
39	FW	IND	Ashish Jha
41	GK	IND	Jaskarenvir Singh
66	DF	IND	Lironthung Latha

No.	Pos.	Nation	Player
—	DF	IND	Shankar Sampingiraj
—	MF	IND	Kean Lewis
—	FW	IND	Robin Singh
—	DF	IND	Rino Anto
—	DF	IND	Gurtej Singh
—	MF	IND	Ashish Pradhan
—	DF	IND	Keegan Pereira
—	FW	IND	C. K. Vineeth
—	GK	IND	Lalthuammawia Ralte
—	FW	ENG	Kurtis Guthrie
—	DF	ENG	John Johnson
—	FW	AUS	Travis Major
—	DF	IND	Lalchhuanmawia

== Transfers ==
=== In ===
No.	Position	Player	Previous club	Transfer fee	Date	Ref
	DM	(India) Shankar Sampingiraj	(India) Chennai City	Free agent	31 July 2021	
	MF	(India) Kean Lewis	(India) Sudeva FC	Free agent	2 August 2021	
	FW	(India) Robin Singh	(India) Hyderabad FC	Free agent	9 August 2021	
	DF	(India) Rino Anto	(India) East Bengal	Free agent	10 August 2021	
	DF	(India) Gurtej Singh	(India) East Bengal	Free agent	11 August 2021	
	MF	(India) Ashish Pradhan	(India) Southern Samity	Free agent	18 August 2021	
	DF	(India) Keegan Pereira	(India) East Bengal	Free agent	24 August 2021	
	FW	(India) C. K. Vineeth	(India) East Bengal	Free agent	25 August 2021	
	GK	(India) Lalthuammawia Ralte	(India) Bengaluru FC	Free agent	28 August 2021	
	DF	(England) John Johnson	(India) ATK Mohun Bagan	Free agent	1 September 2021	
	FW	(England) Kurtis Guthrie	(England) Port Vale	Free agent	2 September 2021	
	FW	(Australia) Travis Major	(Australia) Blacktown City	Free agent	3 September 2021	
	DF	(India) Lalchhuanmawia	(India) Chennaiyin FC	Free agent	15 September 2021	
	DF	(England) Josef Yarney	(England) Weymouth	Free agent	5 November 2021	

=== Out ===
No.	Position	Player	Outgoing club	Ref
05	DF	(India) Anwar Ali	(India) Delhi FC	
04	DF	(India) Ruivah Hormipam	(India) Kerala Blasters FC	
03	MF	(India) Samad Ali Mallick	(India) Sreenidi Deccan	
03	GK	(India) Devansh Dabas	(India) Lonestar Kashmir	
15	MF	(India) Sanju Pradhan	(India) Bengaluru United	
7	FW	(Bhutan) Chencho Gyeltshen	(India) Kerala Blasters	
10	FW	(Senegal) Baba Diawara		
1	GK	(Nepal) Kiran Chemjong	(Nepal) Dhangadhi FC	
8	MF	(India) Souvik Das	(India) Sudeva Delhi	
19	DF	(India) Mohammed Irshad	(India) NorthEast United	
	FW	(India) Jiten Murmu	(India) Madan Maharaj	
	FW	(India) Abhinas Ruidas	(India) Madan Maharaj	

== Team management ==
Position	Name
Technical Director	(Greece) Nikolaos Topoliatis
Head coach	(England) Ashley Westwood
Assistant Coach	(India)
Goalkeeping Coach	(India)

== Competitions ==
=== I-League ===
==== League table ====
Pos	Team	Pld	W	D	L	GF	GA	GD	Pts	Qualification
1	Gokulam Kerala	12	9	3	0	33	10	+23	30	Championship stage
2	Mohammedan	12	8	2	2	23	12	+11	26	Championship stage
3	RoundGlass Punjab	12	7	2	3	25	17	+8	23	Championship stage
4	Sreenidi Deccan	12	6	3	3	18	14	+4	21	Championship stage
5	Churchill Brothers	12	6	2	4	16	15	+1	20	Championship stage

Source: Hero I-League
Rules for classification: 1) points; 2) head-to-head points; 3) head-to-head goal difference; 4) goal difference; 5) number of goals scored; 6) drawing of lots

Pos	Team	Pld	W	D	L	GF	GA	GD	Pts
3	Sreenidi Deccan	18	9	5	4	27	19	+8	32
4	Churchill Brothers	18	9	3	6	24	22	+2	30
5	RoundGlass Punjab	18	8	4	6	33	29	+4	28
6	Rajasthan United	18	5	7	6	16	16	0	22
7	NEROCA	18	4	8	6	21	30	−9	20

Source: Hero I-League
Rules for classification: 1) points; 2) head-to-head points; 3) head-to-head goal difference; 4) goal difference; 5) number of goals scored; 6) drawing of lots

Pos	Team	Pld	W	D	L	GF	GA	GD	Pts
1	Aizawl	17	7	0	10	23	26	−3	21
2	TRAU	17	4	6	7	15	17	−2	18
3	Indian Arrows	17	4	5	8	10	23	−13	17 (Note: Head-to-head standings: Indian Arrows 4 points, Sudeva Delhi 1 point.)
4	Sudeva Delhi	17	4	5	8	13	23	−10	17
5	Real Kashmir	17	2	8	7	23	31	−8	14
6	Kenkre	17	3	3	11	11	25	−14	12

Source: Hero I-League
Rules for classification: 1) points; 2) head-to-head points; 3) head-to-head goal difference; 4) goal difference; 5) number of goals scored; 6) drawing of lots
Notes:

Pos	Team	Pld	W	D	L	GF	GA	GD	Pts
3	Sreenidi Deccan	18	9	5	4	27	19	+8	32
4	Churchill Brothers	18	9	3	6	24	22	+2	30
5	RoundGlass Punjab	18	8	4	6	33	29	+4	28
6	Rajasthan United	18	5	7	6	16	16	0	22
7	NEROCA	18	4	8	6	21	30	−9	20

Source: Hero I-League
Rules for classification: 1) points; 2) head-to-head points; 3) head-to-head goal difference; 4) goal difference; 5) number of goals scored; 6) drawing of lots

== See also ==
- 2021–22 in Indian football
- 2021–22 I-League
