= 2014–15 Bengaluru FC season =

2nd season in existence of Bengaluru FC

Bengaluru FC
2014–15 season
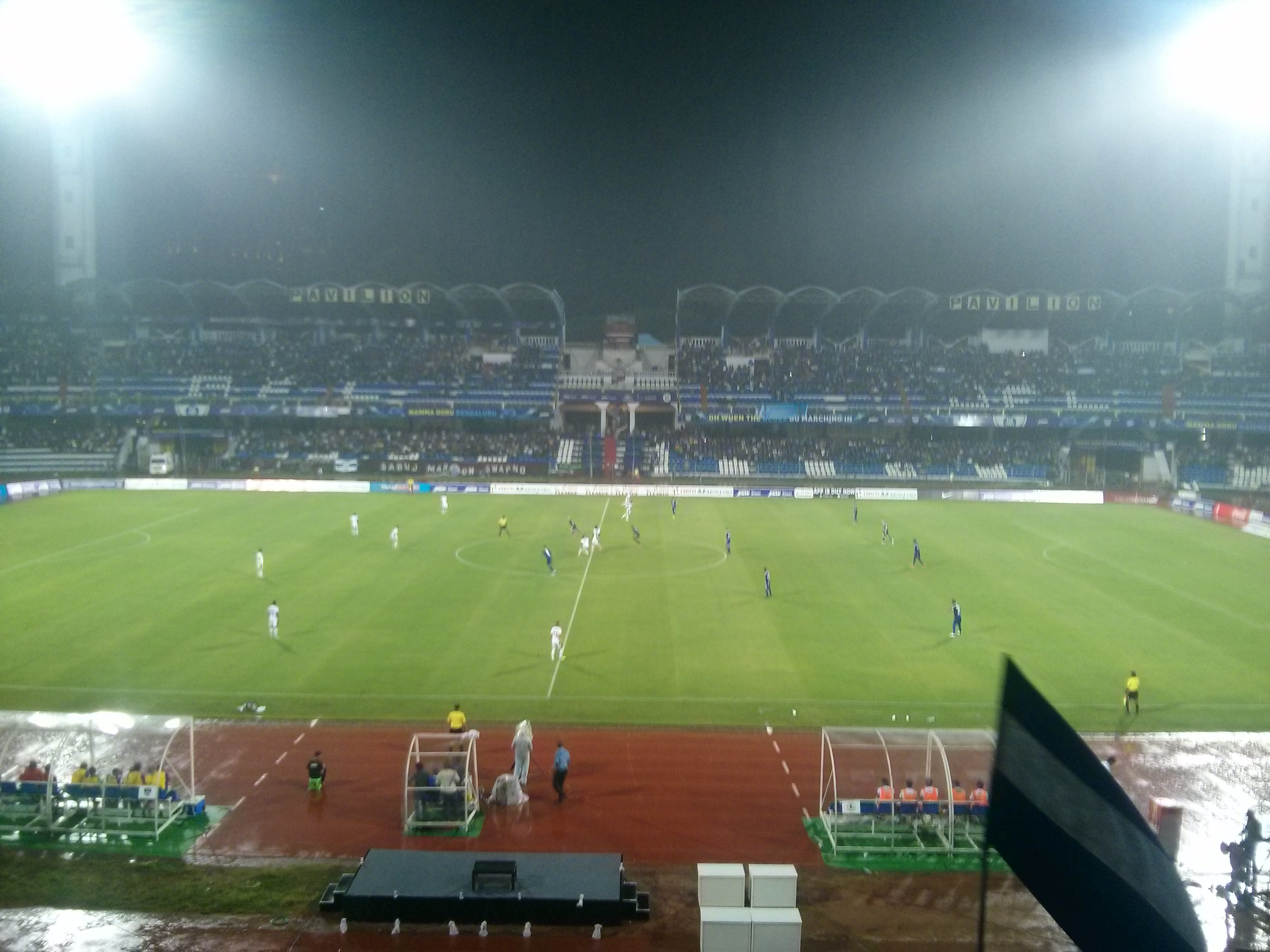
- Bengaluru FC vs Mohun Bagan at Sree Kanteerava.
- Chairman: Parth Jindal
- Manager: Ashley Westwood
- Stadium: Sree Kanteerava Stadium
- I-League: 2nd
- Federation Cup: Winners
- Durand Cup: Semi-finals
- AFC Champions League: Qualifying play-off
- AFC Cup: Round of 16
- Top goalscorer: League: Eugeneson Lyngdoh; Robin Singh (6 goals); All: Sunil Chhetri (14 goals)
- Highest home attendance: 21,786 vs Mohun Bagan (31 May 2015)
- Lowest home attendance: 3,148 vs Persipura Jayapura (12 May 2015)
Home colours	Away colours	Third colours

The 2014–15 season was Bengaluru FC's second season in the I-League since its establishment in 2013. This season was the first season that Bengaluru FC competed in Asian competition.

Bengaluru began the season as the defending champions, but could not defend the title as they could manage only a draw in the last game against the winners Mohun Bagan, but the club had the longest unbeaten run (13 games).

In continental cups, they lost in the first round of the 2015 AFC Champions League qualifying play-off and then participated in group stage of the AFC Cup, where they reached Round of 16.

In domestic cups, Bengaluru FC started the season with the 2014 Durand Cup where they lost in semi-finals to Salgaocar on penalties. Bengaluru FC also participated in Federation Cup. They finished the tournament as champions after defeating Dempo in the final 2–1.

22 different players represented the club in five different competitions and there were 13 different goal scorers. Sunil Chhetri was Bengaluru's top scorer with 14 goals in 36 appearances.

== Background ==
Bengaluru FC was unveiled on 21 July 2013 and played their first season in 2013–14. After playing their first ever game against Mohun Bagan on 22 September 2013, Bengaluru FC won the 2013–14 I-League when they defeated Dempo 4–2 on 21 April 2014 and created the history by being the first team to win I-League in its debut year.

In July 2014, Bengaluru signed a deal with Puma as their official kit sponsors from the 2014–15 season. This season Bengaluru also moved from Bangalore Football Stadium to Sree Kanteerava Stadium due to rebuilding of the old stadium for 2017 FIFA U-17 World Cup. As the winner of 2013–14 I-League, Bengaluru competed at Asian competitions, for the first time.

=== Transfers ===
Bengaluru FC began signing players for the 2014–15 season as early as April when they signed Tata Football Academy graduate Udanta Singh. Bengaluru FC also released veteran mid-fielder Johnny Menyongar at the end of previous season. Bengaluru FC signed Josh Walker as their marquee player. On 15 July 2014, Bengaluru announced they signed two more players, Eugeneson Lyngdoh and Lalchhuan Mawia. Over the summer, Bengaluru also signed Shillong Lajong goalkeeper Lalthuammawia Ralte.

==== In ====
No.	Position	Player	Signed from	Date	Ref
10	MF	(England) Josh Walker	(England) Gateshead	7 July 2014	
14	MF	(India) Eugeneson Lyngdoh	(India) Rangdajied United	15 July 2014	
21	FW	(India) Udanta Singh	(India) Tata Football Academy	19 April 2014	
23	DF	(India) Lalchhuan Mawia	(India) Shillong Lajong	15 July 2014	
28	GK	(India) Lalthuammawia Ralte	(India) Shillong Lajong	Summer 2014	
32	MF	(India) Shilton D'Silva	Free Agent	Summer 2014	

==== Out ====
No.	Position	Player	Team	Date	Ref
10	AM	(Liberia) Johnny Menyongar	Released	30 April 2014	
14	MF	(India) Sampath Kuttymani	(India) Mumbai	Summer 2014	
22	GK	(India) Bruno Colaço	(India) Dempo	Summer 2014	
23	DF	(India) Lalrozama Fanai	(India) Aizawl	Summer 2014	
25	MF	(India) Niroshan Mani	(India) Students Union	Summer 2014	
26	DF	(India) Thomas Lalengkima	(India) Aizawl	Summer 2014	
27	MF	(India) Amoes	(India) Mumbai	Summer 2014	
28	MF	(India) Don Bosco Andrew	Released	Summer 2014	
	MF	(India) Randhan Meitei	Released	Summer 2014	

==== Loan out ====
No.	Position	Player	On Loan to	Date	Ref
32	MF	(India) Shilton D'Silva	(India) Mumbai	March 2015	

== Pre-season and friendlies ==
Bengaluru FC played two friendlies against Salgaocar and Pune in August 2014 at Duler Stadium, Goa. Bengaluru won the first game against Salgaocar through a solo goal from Curtis Osano in the first half. The second friendly against Pune ended in 1–1 draw after Robin Singh scored a goal in the first half. Bengaluru then toured China and Hong Kong for further pre-season friendlies. In the first game of the tour, Bengaluru registered 0–1 win against Guangdong Sunray Cave, courtesy of an 87th-minute goal from Malemngamba Meetei. In the second game against Eastern AA, Bengaluru failed to score a goal and lost 0–2. In the final game of the tour, Bengaluru played Guangzhou R&F and faced another defeat 0–3.

Bengaluru FC also participated in the local tournament, Puttaiah Memorial Cup, which they won by defeating ASC 8–1 in the final.

5 August 2014 Friendly	Bengaluru FC	1–0	Salgaocar	Mapusa
	Osano 14'			Stadium: Duler Stadium

9 August 2014 Friendly	Bengaluru FC	1–1	Pune	Mapusa
	R. Singh 44'	Report	Ahmed	Stadium: Duler Stadium

1 October 2014 Friendly	Guangdong Sunray Cave	0–1	Bengaluru FC	Guangzhou
		Report	M. Meetei 87'	Stadium: Huangpu Sports Center

6 October 2014 Friendly	Eastern AA	2–0	Bengaluru FC	Guangzhou
	Reinaldo 1'; Giovane 15'	Report		Stadium: Tianhe Stadium

9 October 2014 Friendly	Guangzhou R&F	3–0	Bengaluru FC	Guangzhou
	Zhang Shao 4'; Zhang Yuan 29'; Zhang Chenlong	Report		Stadium: Tianhe Stadium

== Competitions ==
=== Overall ===
Competition	Started round	Final position	First match	Last match
Durand Cup	Quarter-finals	Semi-finals	30 October 2014	6 November 2014
Federation Cup	Group stage	Winners	28 December 2014	11 January 2015
I-League	—	2nd	17 January 2015	31 May 2015
AFC Champions League	Qualifying	Qualifying	4 February 2015	
AFC Cup	Group stage	Round of 16	24 February 2015	26 May 2015

Last Updated: 31 May 2015
Source : Competitions

=== Overview ===
Competition	Record							
Competition	Pld	W	D	L	GF	GA	GD	Win %
Durand Cup	3	1	2	0	4	3	+1	33.33
Federation Cup	6	5	1	0	11	4	+7	83.33
I-League	20	10	7	3	35	19	+16	50.00
AFC Champions League	1	0	0	1	1	2	−1	0.00
AFC Cup	7	4	0	3	8	10	−2	57.14
Total	37	20	10	7	59	38	+21	54.05

Last updated: 31 May 2015
Source: Competitions

=== I-League ===
==== Summary ====
===== January =====
Bengaluru began the defense of the I-League title on 17 January 2015 against Dempo. Bengaluru had the chance to take the lead when they were awarded a penalty in 44th minute but Sunil Chhetri could not convert to chance. The match eventually ended in a goal-less draw. The next match for Bengaluru FC was worse as they went down to Pune 1–3 in their next home game. Pune took an early 0–2 lead through Darko Nikac and Luciano Sabrosa. Pune furthered their advantage in the 82nd minute when Thongkhosiem Haokip connected well with Yumnam Raju's cross for the ball to bounce beyond the goal-line after rattling the crossbar. In the closing minutes, Bengaluru pulled one back when Eugeneson Lyngdoh scored a goal with the assist from Sean Rooney. In their next game against East Bengal, Bengaluru could not find the back of the net, in spite of dominating in the first half and creating multiple chances. In the second half, Abhinas Ruidas scored a goal for East Bengal against the run of play while Bengaluru continued to miss chances and thus game ended 1–0 in favour of East Bengal and Bengaluru's winless streak was extended to three games. However, Bengaluru finally secured the first win of the season in the away game against newly promoted, and then table toppers, Royal Wahingdoh with a dominant 4–0 win. Thoi Singh scored a brace, while Eugeneson Lyngdoh and C.K. Vineeth scored a goal each.

===== February =====
In February, Bengaluru played against newly inducted team from Pune, Bharat FC. The only goal of the match was scored by Eugeneson Lyngdoh in 78th minute as Bengaluru won their second game of the season, 1–0. During their next match against Shillong Lajong, Bengaluru took an early lead when Robin Singh converted the cross from Shankar Sampingiraj with a header. Towards the end of first half Bengaluru were down to 10 men when Curtis Osano was sent-off for a dangerous challenge on Cornell Glenn, but Bengaluru continued to attack and doubled the lead through Thoi Singh's header from a Eugeneson Lyngdoh's cross. That victory meant that Bengaluru won their third consecutive game and rose to second in the I-League table. On 20 February, in the away game against Mohun Bagan, the team started well when Sunil Chhetri scored his first goal of season in the league in 8th minute, but Bengaluru unfolded quickly and conceded 4 goals which included a brace from Sony Norde, owing to blunders from the Bengaluru goalkeeper and poor defense overall. Bengaluru bounced back to win the next game 3–1 against Sporting Clube de Goa with a brace from Sean Rooney and a goal from Beikhokhei Beingaichho, both scoring their first goals in the league.

===== March =====
Bengaluru began March with an away game against Mumbai. After persistent attack from both sides, Bengaluru scored first when Eugeneson Lyngdoh curled a shot into the far corner. Mumbai equalized quickly in the second half via Josimar. Bengaluru created chances late in the game, but man of the match, Mumbai goalkeeper Nidhin Lal, saved all the attempts and both teams eventually shared a point. After the mid-season break, Bengaluru played the away game against Salgaocar. The game also marked the return of top players of Bengaluru, who were away for the national duty. Bengaluru enjoyed a lion share of possession, but could not convert any chances in the first half and the game remained goalless. Robin Singh finally broke the deadlock with a pass from Rino Anto. Salgaocar had the chance to equalize when they were awarded penalty, but man of the match Lalthuammawia Ralte, correctly guessed the direction and saved the penalty to secure 3 points for Bengaluru. Bengaluru ended the March on a high note with a convincing 4–1 victory at home against Sporting Clube de Goa. Bengaluru took the lead in the first half when Josh Walker's header converted a pass from Eugeneson Lyngdoh in a goal. Rino Anto, Thoi Singh, and Beikhokhei Beingaichho scored a goal each in the second half. Sporting Goa's multiple attacks, especially from Odafe Onyeka Okolie, were thwarted by man of the match Lalthuammawia Ralte.

===== April =====
In April, Bengaluru played the home game against Royal Wahingdoh. The game saw flurry of goals with Robin Singh, Shankar Sampingiraj, Josh Walker countering three goals by the visiting team and the game ended at 3–3. Before the next game against Mumbai, Bengaluru were trailing by 3 points to the table topper Mohun Bagan, in spite of having played 2 more games, so it was a crucial match for Bengaluru to stay in the title hunt, but the game turned out to be 4th consecutive draw between the two sides. In spite of continuous attack by Bengaluru, the first half remained goalless. In the second half, against the run of the play, Rahul Bheke scored the goal for visitors to take the lead in 67th minute. Bengaluru intensified the attack and Robin Singh equalized in the closing minutes before he was sent-off. The next game for Bengaluru was another top of the table clash with Pune F.C. Bengaluru quickly got ahead when Shankar Sampingiraj scored the fastest goal of the season and the second fastest I-League goal of all time, in 15 seconds. Bengaluru doubled the lead just before half-time when C.K. Vineeth scored a goal from Beikhokhei Beingaichho's pass and Bengaluru scored their first ever win against Pune team. In three days, Bengaluru faced another Pune based team Bharat FC. Facing the depleted time, Bengaluru easily won the game 2–0 with goals from Eugeneson Lyngdoh and C.K. Vineeth in each half respectively, with both the assists coming from Sean Rooney.

===== May =====
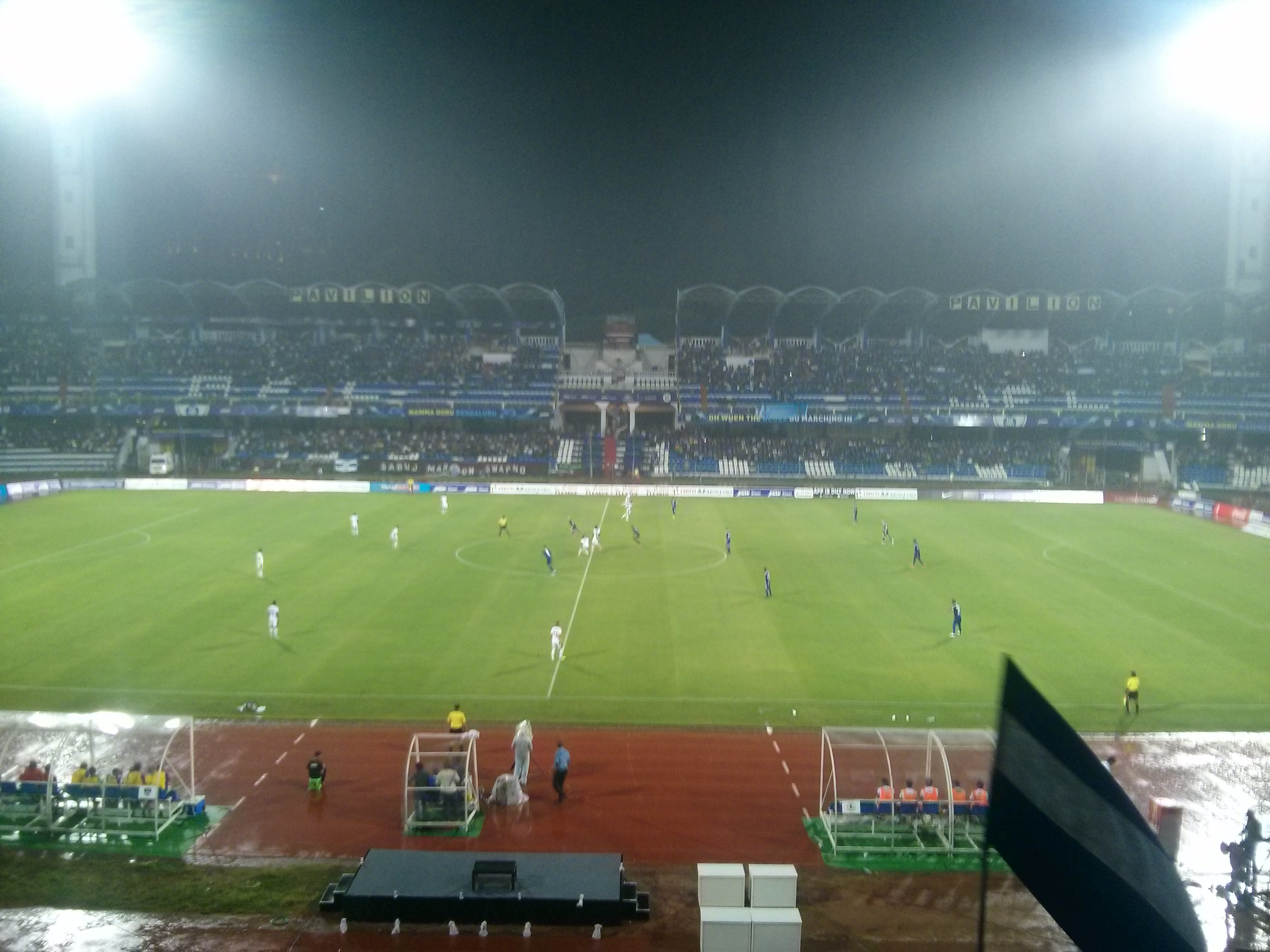
Bengaluru FC vs Mohun Bagan

May started with home fixture against East Bengal. Bengaluru had never registered a win against East Bengal in previous five encounters across various tournaments. Though East Bengal started on attacking note, It was Bengaluru who came out on top as Sean Rooney, Sunil Chhetri and Robin Singh scored a goal each and man of the match Lalthuammawia Ralte maintained a clean-sheet in the game and Bengaluru secured its first win against East Bengal. Bengaluru then travelled to Shillong, where a win against Shillong Lajong could put them on the top of the table. After taking the lead towards the end of the first half through Sean Rooney's goal, Bengaluru could not hold on to the lead and conceded a penalty in 65th minute and the game ended in 1–1 draw. After facing defeat against Persipura Jayapura in the AFC cup, Bengaluru returned to form against Salgaocar when they registered 3–1 win. After leading in the first half by 26th-minute goal from Thoi Singh, Bengaluru faced equalizer from Darryl Duffy, but Eugeneson Lyngdoh quickly restored the lead. Man of the match Curtis Osano scored his first goal ever for the team in 80th minute and got on the scoresheet for the victory. In the last away game of the season, Bengaluru played against Dempo. Bengaluru took the lead through Robin Singh's goal, but could not hold on to the lead as Uttam Rai scored one back and the match ended at 1–1 with Bengaluru trailing the table toppers, Mohun Bagan by 2 points. In the final home game against Mohun Bagan, Bengaluru needed an outright win to defend the title. Bengaluru looked on course to defend the title when John Johnson scored his first goal of the season with a header, from Rino Anto's cross, but Mohun Bagan defender Bello Razaq scored the equalizer in 87th minute. Bengaluru's subsequent attack could not find the winner and they conceded the title to Mohun Bagan, though Bengaluru ended the season with the longest unbeaten run of 13 games, equalizing the record set by East Bengal in 2010–11 season.

In spite of being a runner-up, Ashley Westwood maintained that Mohun Bagan hadn't done enough to deserve the league and Bengaluru FC was the best side in the league:

We were the most consistent side and still think we were the best side. Full credit to Bagan but I feel they did not have enough competition because they won only two away games and anywhere else in the world you can’t win the league having won only two away games. But on paper they are the champions. The positive was that we went 13 league games without losing. We were so close to winning the league, reached the knockout stage of the AFC Cup and won the Federation Cup. We showed great depth and strength.

==== Matches ====
17 January 2015 1	Bengaluru FC	0–0	Dempo	Bengaluru
19:00 IST	R. Singh (yellow card) 16'; Johnson (yellow card) 45+2'	Report	Roy (yellow card) 9'; Angus (yellow card) 44'; George (yellow card) 64'; Rodrigues (yellow card) 71'	Stadium: Sree Kanteerava Stadium; Attendance: 11,424; Referee: Ranjit Bakshi; Man of the Match: Laxmikant Kattimani (Dempo)

24 January 2015 2	Bengaluru FC	1–3	Pune	Bengaluru
19:00 IST	R. Singh (yellow card) 72'; Lyngdoh 89'	Report	Nikac 9'; Luciano 25'; T. Haokip 82'	Stadium: Sree Kanteerava Stadium; Attendance: 9,124; Referee: R. Saha; Man of the Match: Amrinder Singh (Pune)

28 January 2015 3	East Bengal	1–0	Bengaluru FC	Kolkata
19:00 IST	Monda (yellow card) 33'; Ruidas 53'	Report	Chhetri (yellow card) 90+6'	Stadium: Salt Lake Stadium; Referee: C.R. Srikrishna; Man of the Match: Abhinas Ruidas (East Bengal)

31 January 2015 4	Royal Wahingdoh	0–4	Bengaluru FC	Shillong
16:30 IST	Lalchawnkima (yellow card) 13'	Report	C.K. Vineeth 34'; Lyngdoh 60' (yellow card) 77'; T. Singh (yellow card) 24' (goal) 67', 78'; Osano (yellow card) 87'	Stadium: Jawaharlal Nehru Stadium; Man of the Match: Thoi Singh (Bengaluru FC)

8 February 2015 5	Bengaluru FC	1–0	Bharat FC	Bengaluru
19:00 IST	Lyngdoh 78'; Ralte (yellow card) 89'	Report	Ravanan (yellow card) 30'; Bright (yellow card) 67'; Vignesh (yellow card) 90'	Stadium: Sree Kanteerava Stadium; Attendance: 8,954; Referee: T. Nagvenkar; Man of the Match: Eugeneson Lyngdoh (Bengaluru FC)

14 February 2015 6	Bengaluru FC	2–0	Shillong Lajong	Bengaluru
19:00 IST	R. Singh 17'; Curtis Osano (red card) 41'; T. Singh 60'	Report	Khongjee (yellow card) 81'	Stadium: Sree Kanteerava Stadium; Attendance: 7,068; Referee: Pranjal Banerjee; Man of the Match: Thoi Singh (Bengaluru FC)

20 February 2015 7	Mohun Bagan	4–1	Bengaluru FC	Kolkata
19:00 IST	Norde 31', 76'; Debnath (yellow card) 45+1'; Yusa 87'; B. Singh 90+4'	Report	Chhetri 8' (yellow card) 42'; R. Singh (yellow card) 22'; Pereira (yellow card) 34'; Lyngdoh (yellow card) 44'; Sampingiraj (yellow card) 66'	Stadium: Salt Lake Stadium; Referee: Ajit Meetei; Man of the Match: Sony Norde (Mohun Bagan)

28 February 2015 8	Sporting Goa	1–3	Bengaluru FC	Margao
19:00 IST	Passi (yellow card) 15'; Singh (yellow card) 27'; Martins (yellow card) 45'; Wolfe 66'	Report	R. Singh (yellow card) 10'; Anto (yellow card) 14'; Rooney 29', 45+1'; Johnson (yellow card) 62'; Beingaichho 85'	Stadium: Fatorda Stadium; Referee: M. Santosh Kumar; Man of the Match: Sean Rooney (Bengaluru FC)

3 March 2015 9	Mumbai	1–1	Bengaluru FC	Mumbai
16:30 IST	Dias (yellow card) 20'; Josimar (yellow card) 34' (goal) 49'	Report	Lyngdoh 31'; T. Singh (yellow card) 55'	Stadium: Cooperage Ground; Attendance: 3,900; Referee: Ajit Dutta; Man of the Match: Nidhin Lal (Mumbai)

21 March 2015 10	Salgaocar	0–1	Bengaluru FC	Margao
19:00 IST	Mundampara (yellow card) 17'; Oliveira (yellow card) 56'; Kumar (yellow card) 76' (yellow-red card) 86'; T. Singh (yellow card) 89'	Report	R. Singh 78'	Stadium: Fatorda Stadium; Referee: Rowan Arumughan; Man of the Match: Lalthuammawia Ralte (Bengaluru)

31 March 2015 11	Bengaluru FC	4–1	Sporting Goa	Bengaluru
19:00 IST	Lyngdoh (yellow card) 26'; Walker 33'; Anto 51'; T. Singh 60'; Beingaichho 80'	Report	Gonsalves (yellow card) 48'; Victorino 83' rao (yellow card) 84'	Stadium: Sree Kanteerava Stadium; Attendance: 4,248; Referee: Ranjit Bakshi; Man of the Match: Lalthuammawia Ralte (Bengaluru)

3 April 2015 12	Bengaluru FC	3–3	Royal Wahingdoh	Bengaluru
19:00 IST	T. Singh (yellow card) 33'; R. Singh 39'; Sampingiraj 58'; Walker 70'	Report	Seng-yong 15'; Theobald (yellow card) 37'; G. Franco 44'; P. Singh (yellow card) 72'; R. Singh 74'	Stadium: Sree Kanteerava Stadium; Attendance: 5,438; Referee: Pratap Singh; Man of the Match: Reagan Singh (Royal Wahingdoh)

7 April 2015 13	Bengaluru FC	1–1	Mumbai	Bengaluru
19:00 IST	Rooney (yellow card) 47'; Johnson (yellow card) 50'; R. Singh 88' (red card) 90+4'	Report	Wali (yellow card) 11'; Pereira (yellow card) 40'; Josimar (yellow card) 62'; Bheke 67'	Stadium: Sree Kanteerava Stadium; Attendance: 4,628; Referee: Ranjit Bakshi; Man of the Match: Robin Singh (Bengaluru FC)

21 April 2015 14	Pune	0–2	Bengaluru FC	Pune
19:00 IST	Luaha (yellow card) 82'	Report	Sampingiraj 1'; Vineeth 43'	Stadium: Shree Shiv Chhatrapati Sports Complex; Referee: Vishnu Chauhan; Man of the Match: Shankar Sampingiraj (Bengaluru FC)

24 April 2015 15	Bharat FC	0–2	Bengaluru FC	Pune
19:00 IST		Report	Lyngdoh 29'; Anto (yellow card) 40'; Vineeth 56'	Stadium: Shree Shiv Chhatrapati Sports Complex; Referee: Pranjal Banerjee; Man of the Match: Romuald Boco (Bharat FC)

3 May 2015 16	Bengaluru FC	3–0	East Bengal	Bengaluru
19:00 IST	Rooney 31'; Chhetri 60'; Anto (yellow card) 86'; R. Singh 88'	Report	Khabra (yellow card) 82'	Stadium: Sree Kanteerava Stadium; Attendance: 8,164; Referee: Rowan Arumughan; Man of the Match: Lalthuammawia Ralte (Bengaluru FC)

8 May 2015 17	Shillong Lajong	1–1	Bengaluru FC	Shillong
16:00 IST	Uilliams (yellow card) 39' (goal) 65' (pen.); Min-chol (yellow card) 44'; Bhutia (yellow card) 83'; M. Singh (yellow card) 90+2'		Rooney 45'; Vineeth (yellow card) 56'; Sampingiraj (yellow card) 90+2'; R. Singh (yellow card) 90+2'	Stadium: Jawaharlal Nehru Stadium; Referee: Santhosh Kumar; Man of the Match: Eugeneson Lyngdoh (Bengaluru FC)

17 May 2015 18	Bengaluru FC	3–1	Salgaocar	Bengaluru
19:00 IST	T. Singh 26'; Johnson (yellow card) 29'; Lalchhuanmawia (yellow card) 31'; Lyngdoh 73'; Osano 80'; R. Singh (yellow card) 90+2'	Report	Duffy 71'	Stadium: Sree Kanteerava Stadium; Attendance: 4,800; Referee: Ajit Meetei; Man of the Match: Curtis Osano (Bengaluru FC)

23 May 2015 19	Dempo	1–1	Bengaluru FC	Margao
19:00 IST	Rai 77'	Report	R. Singh 65'	Stadium: Fatorda Stadium; Referee: OP Thakur; Man of the Match: Uttam Rai (Dempo)

31 May 2015 20	Bengaluru FC	1–1	Mohun Bagan	Bengaluru
19:00 IST	Lyngdoh (yellow card) 32'; Johnson 41'; R. Singh (yellow card) 65'; Fanai (yellow card) 78'	Report	B. Singh (yellow card) 19'; Razaq 87'	Stadium: Sree Kanteerava Stadium; Attendance: 21,786; Referee: Santosh Kumar; Man of the Match: Bello Razaq (Mohun Bagan)

Win Draw Loss Void Postponed

==== Table ====
Pos	Team	Pld	W	D	L	GF	GA	GD	Pts	Qualification or relegation
1	Mohun Bagan (C)	20	11	6	3	33	16	+17	39	Qualification for AFC Champions League qualifying play-off
2	Bengaluru	20	10	7	3	35	19	+16	37	Qualification for AFC Cup group stage (Note: Bengaluru FC, as the winner of 2014–15 Federation Cup, qualified for the 2016 AFC Cup)
3	Royal Wahingdoh	20	8	6	6	27	27	0	30	
4	East Bengal	20	8	5	7	30	28	+2	29 (Note: East Bengal ahead on goal difference, head-to-head record being the same; Pune 2–3 East Bengal East Bengal 1–2 Pune)	
5	Pune	20	8	5	7	24	26	−2	29	

Source: IndiaFooty.com
Rules for classification: 1) points; 2) head-to-head points; 3) head-to-head goal difference; 4) goal difference; 5) number of goals scored; 6) play-off match.
(C) Champions

==== Results by round ====
Round	1	2	3	4	5	6	7	8	9	10	11	12	13	14	15	16	17	18	19	20
Ground	H	H	A	A	H	H	A	A	A	A	H	H	H	A	A	H	A	H	A	H
Result	D	L	L	W	W	W	L	W	D	W	W	D	D	W	W	W	D	W	D	D

Updated to match(es) played on 31 May 2015. Source: I-League
A = Away; H = Home; W = Win; D = Draw; L = Loss

=== AFC Champions League ===
In April 2014, it was announced that India will get a playoff spot in the 2015 AFC Champions League. Bengaluru being I-League champions qualified for the tournament. On 11 December 2014, during the AFC Champions League draw, it was announced that Bengaluru would first play in the first round of the East Asia zone qualifiers against 2014 Malaysia Super League winner Johor Darul Ta'zim at the Larkin Stadium.

After goalless first half, Johor Darul Ta'zim immediately scored in the second with a goal from Hariss Harun. Bengaluru were unlucky as they hit the post a couple of times, but couldn't score a goal, but continued the attack. Finally in the closing minutes, Eugeneson Lyngdoh scored a goal directly from the corner and the match went into extra-time. Johor Darul Ta'zim again took the lead when Suppiah Chanturu placed the ball past Bengaluru keeper, Lalthuammawia Ralte. Bengaluru continued to attack, but couldn't find an equalizer and thus were eliminated from the AFC Champions League early. As a result, Bengaluru then contested in 2015 AFC Cup in group E.

4 February 2015 Qualifying Playoff	Johor Darul Ta'zim (Malaysia)	2–1 (a.e.t.)	(India) Bengaluru	Johor Bahru, Malaysia
20:45 UTC+8	Zaina (yellow card) 17'; Harun 47'; Chanturu 97'	Report	Johnson (yellow card) 67'; Lyngdoh 90'; Osano (yellow card) 90+5'; Hanghal (yellow card) 95'	Stadium: Larkin Stadium; Attendance: 17,455; Referee: Yudai Yamamoto (Japan); MVP: Hariss Harun (Johor Darul Ta'zim)

=== AFC Cup ===
After losing the qualification play-off for the AFC Champions League, Bengaluru were placed into the 2015 AFC Cup group stage. They were placed in Group E with Indonesia Super League runners-up Persipura Jayapura, S.League champions Warriors, and Dhivehi League side Maziya S&RC.

==== Group stage ====
Bengaluru started their first ever AFC Cup campaign against Maldivian side Maziya S&RC on 28 February 2015. After a goalless first half, Sunil Chhetri gave Bengaluru FC the lead in the 67th minute. When Bengaluru seemed be heading for the victory towards the end of the match, Maziya were awarded a penalty in 88th minute, which they converted. However, Bengaluru scored a last gasp winner in stoppage time when Shankar Sampingiraj headed the ball into the net from Eugeneson Lyngdoh's cross. In their second game against Persipura Jayapura, Bengaluru started without their top players, Sunil Chhetri, Robin Singh, Shankar Sampingiraj, Keegan Pereira, Eugeneson Lyngdoh and Siam Hanghal, due to a schedule conflict with World Cup qualification. Persipura took a decisive lead of 2–0 in the first half against a lackluster Bengaluru FC side. Persipura extended their lead in the second half, though in the closing minutes C.K. Vineeth pulled one back for Bengaluru as they lost 3–1. Still missing their top players, Bengaluru played the next game at home against Warriors FC. Bengaluru got a penalty in the first half, when C.K. Vineeth was brought down inside the box. English mid-fielder Josh Walker stepped up to take the penalty and scored his first ever goal for the team.

Bengaluru began the reverse leg with an away game against Warriors FC at Singapore. While the first half saw missed chances, Robin Singh scored the decisive goal in 76th minute and the visitors secured 1–0 win. Bengaluru, needing only one point to advance to the next stage, visited Maziya S&RC for the fifth game. After trailing in 62nd minute, Bengaluru quickly equalized in 71st minute via a penalty, taken by Sunil Chhetri. Chhetri went on to score a brace and secure 1–2 win for Bengaluru and confirming a place in pre-quarters. In the final game of the group stage, Bengaluru faced Persipura Jayapura at home. Bengaluru took the lead in 24th minute with a goal from Udanta Singh, but Persipura quickly equalized 6 minutes later. Persipura continued to enjoy the possession in the second half and scored two goals in the last quarter and won the game 1–3. The loss ended Bengaluru's unbeaten streak of 12 matches, across all tournaments, which incidentally began after the loss against Persipura in the reverse leg on 10 March 2015.

Pos	Team	Pld	W	D	L	GF	GA	GD	Pts	Qualification	PSJ	BGL	MAZ	WAR
1	(Indonesia) Persipura Jayapura	6	5	1	0	17	4	+13	16	Advance to knockout stage	—	3–1	0–0	6–0
2	(India) Bengaluru	6	4	0	2	8	8	0	12	Advance to knockout stage	1–3	—	2–1	1–0
3	(Maldives) Maziya	6	2	1	3	7	6	+1	7		1–2	1–2	—	2–0
4	(Singapore) Warriors	6	0	0	6	1	15	−14	0		1–3	0–1	0–2	—

Source: AFC
Rules for classification: Group stage tiebreakers

24 February 2015 1	Bengaluru FC (India)	2–1	(Maldives) Maziya	Bangalore, India
19:30 UTC+5:30	Mawia (yellow card) 55'; Chhetri 68'; Sampingiraj 90+3'	Report	Umair (yellow card) 57' (goal) 89' (pen.)	Stadium: Sree Kanteerava Stadium; Attendance: 6,614; Referee: Aziz Asimov (Uzbekistan); MVP: Sunil Chhetri (Bengaluru)

10 March 2015 2	Persipura Jayapura (Indonesia)	3–1	(India) Bengaluru FC	Jayapura, Indonesia
15:30 UTC+9	Ian 4'; Pugliara 23', 50'	Report	T. Singh (yellow card) 66'; C.K. Vineeth 90'	Stadium: Mandala Stadium; Attendance: 16,263; Referee: Wang Di (China); MVP: Ian Kabes (Persipura Jayapura)

17 March 2015 3	Bengaluru FC (India)	1–0	(Singapore) Warriors	Bengaluru, India
19:30 UTC+5:30	Walker 36' (pen.); Osano (yellow card) 41'; Beingaichho (yellow card) 90+1'	Report	Vélez (yellow card) 74'	Stadium: Sree Kanteerava Stadium; Attendance: 5,264; Referee: Ho Wai Sing (Hong Kong); MVP: Josh Walker (Bengaluru)

14 April 2015 4	Warriors (Singapore)	0–1	(India) Bengaluru FC	Singapore
19:30 UTC+8		Report	Mawia (yellow card) 24'; R. Singh 76'	Stadium: Jalan Besar Stadium; Attendance: 988; Referee: Lee Min-hu (South Korea); MVP: Robin Singh (Bengaluru)

28 April 2015 5	Maziya (Maldives)	1–2	(India) Bengaluru FC	Malé, Maldives
16:00 UTC+5	Rodríguez 62'; Ali (yellow card) 86'; Ismail (yellow card) 90+3'	Report	Walker (yellow card) 47'; T. Singh (yellow card) 54'; Sampingiraj (yellow card) 58'; Chhetri 71' (pen.), 78'; Rooney (yellow card) 85'; R. Singh (yellow card) 90+3'	Stadium: National Football Stadium; Attendance: 962; Referee: Salah Abbas Alabbasi (Bahrain); MVP: Sunil Chhetri (Bengaluru FC)

12 May 2015 6	Bengaluru FC (India)	1–3	(Indonesia) Persipura Jayapura	Bengaluru, India
19:00 UTC+5:30	Udanta 24'	Report	Alom (yellow card) 10'; Robertino 29'; I. Wanggai 72'; B. Solossa 77'	Stadium: Sree Kanteerava Stadium; Attendance: 3,148; Referee: Mohd Nafeez Abdul Wahab (Malaysia); MVP: Imanuel Wanggai (Persipura Jayapura)

==== Knockout stage ====
After finishing as the runner-up in group E, Bengaluru played against Group G winner, South China in a single-legged tie in round of 16 at Mong Kok Stadium, Hong Kong. Bengaluru faced an early setback in 26th minute when the referee awarded penalty to South China for Curtis Osano's seemingly legitimate challenge against Daniel McBreen. McBreen converted the penalty to take 1–0 lead for his side. South China doubled their lead in 58th minute when McBreen completed his brace with a cross from Che Runqiu. Thus Bengaluru's first ever AFC cup campaign ended at Round of 16.

26 May 2015 Round of 16	South China (Hong Kong)	2–0	(India) Bengaluru FC	Hong Kong
20:00 UTC+8	McBreen 28' (pen.), 58'; Pong (yellow card) 77'; Mora (yellow card) 79'	Report	Rooney (yellow card) 25'	Stadium: Mong Kok Stadium; Attendance: 3,381; Referee: Abdulrahman Al-Jassim (Qatar); MVP: Daniel McBreen (South China)

=== Federation cup ===
Bengaluru participated in Federation Cup for the second time in their history and were placed in Group B, along with Mohun Bagan, Pune, Salgaocar and Shillong Lajong.

In the opening game of group stage, against Salgaocar, Bengaluru took the lead when Sunil Chhetri converted the penalty in 25th minute, but Salgaocar quickly equalized in 33rd minute. Chhetri again took the lead for Bengaluru when he converted a pass from Beikhokhei Beingaichho to a goal, but the Goan outfit again equalized in the 41st minute through a goal from Douhou Pierre. Just before the end of the first half, Sean Rooney scored the winner in 45th minute. In the second match against Mohun Bagan, both the teams had chances, but none of them could convert and the game ended in a 0–0 draw. Against Shillong Lajong, after a goal-less first half, Robin Singh, subbed-in at the half time and scored a 50th-minute winner. In the last group stage game against Pune, Chhetri scored a brace in the closing minutes of the first half. Pune pulled one back in the second half as Thongkhosiem Haokip scored in 87th minute, but ultimately Bengaluru won the encounter 1–2 and entered the semi-finals unbeaten and as the group winner.

On 9 January 2015, Bengaluru FC played their semi-final match against Goan club Sporting Goa. Sean Rooney gave Bengaluru FC the lead in the 28th minute with India captain Sunil Chhetri joining him on the scoresheet ten minutes later with another wonderful strike from a narrow angle. Late into the second half, Eugeneson Lyngdoh scored a late goal to make it 3–0 to Bengaluru and thus advance them to the final.

On 11 January 2015, Bengaluru FC played the final against Goan side Dempo. Bengaluru won the final 2–1 with goals scored by Sunil Chhetri and Robin Singh while the Dempo goal came from a penalty strike by Tolgay Özbey. This was the first time Bengaluru FC won the tournament. With 6 goals, Sunil Chhetri was the joint top-scorer of tournament. As the winner, Bengaluru FC are also guaranteed a play-off round spot in 2016 AFC Cup.

==== Group stage ====
Group B

Team	Pld	W	D	L	GF	GA	GD	Pts
Bengaluru FC	4	3	1	0	6	3	+3	10
Salgaocar	4	3	0	1	11	6	+5	9
Mohun Bagan	4	1	2	1	3	5	−2	5
Pune	4	1	1	2	6	7	−1	4
Shillong Lajong	4	0	0	4	2	7	−5	0

28 December 2014	Bengaluru FC	3–2	Salgaocar	Goa
	Chhetri 25' (pen.), 40'; Rooney 45'	Report	Gurjinder 33'; Douhou 41'	Stadium: Tilak Maidan Stadium

30 December 2014	Bengaluru FC	0–0	Mohun Bagan	Goa
		Report		Stadium: Tilak Maidan Stadium

2 January 2015	Bengaluru FC	1–0	Shillong Lajong	Goa
16:00 IST	R. Singh 50'	Report		Stadium: Tilak Maidan Stadium

5 January 2015	Pune	1–2	Bengaluru FC	Goa
16:00 IST	T. Haokip 87'	Report	Chhetri 43', 45+3' (pen.)	Stadium: Tilak Maidan Stadium; Referee: C.R. Srikrishna

==== Semi-finals ====
9 January 2015	Bengaluru FC	3–0	Sporting Goa	Margao
19:00 IST	Rooney 28'; Chhetri 37'; Lyngdoh 87'	Report		Stadium: Fatorda Stadium; Referee: MB Santosh Kumar

==== Final ====
11 January 2015	Dempo	1–2	Bengaluru FC	Margao
16:00 IST	Ozbey 45+3'	Report	Chhetri 10' (pen.); R. Singh 68'	Stadium: Fatorda Stadium; Referee: Pratap Singh

=== Durand cup ===
Bengaluru FC participated in the Durand Cup for the first time in their history and were placed in Group C, along with Mohammedan and SESA Football Academy.

In the first game against Mohammedan, Bengaluru FC led 2–0 at halftime with goals scored by skipper Sunil Chhetri in the 6th minute and Eugeneson Lyngdoh in the 38th minute. Alfred Jaryan scored one goal for Mohammedan in 68th minute, but Bengaluru FC held on to the lead and won their first match in the tournament. In the dramatic second game against SESA Football Academy, Bengaluru FC took lead in 66th minute when Sunil Chhetri was awarded a penalty, but Angelo Colaco and Melwyn Fernandes scored two goals in 79th minute and 92nd minute to get SESA a 1–2 lead. In the closing minutes though, Melwyn Fernandes was sent-off for pulling down John Johnson and Bengaluru FC were awarded another penalty. Sunil Chhetri scored the penalty and Bengaluru FC were through to semi-finals having scored one more goal than SESA, points and goal difference being same for both the teams.

In the semi-finals, Bengaluru faced Group A winner Salgaocar. Both sides failed to score in the regular time and extra-time. In the penalty shoot-out, Sunil Chhetri missed the second penalty and Bengaluru's Durand Cup campaign ended after losing 5–4 in the penalty shoot-out. Salgaocar went on to win the trophy.

==== Quarter-finals ====
Group C

Team	Pld	W	D	L	GF	GA	GD	Pts
Bengaluru	2	1	1	0	4	3	+1	4
SESA	2	1	1	0	3	2	+1	4
Mohammedan	2	0	0	2	1	3	−2	0

30 October 2014	Bengaluru	2–1	Mohammedan	Raia
9:00 IST	Chhetri 6'; Lyngdoh 38'	Report	Jaryan 68'	Stadium: Raia Sports Complex; Referee: Dhanraj More

3 November 2014	Bengaluru	2–2	SESA	Raia
15:45 IST	Chhetri 66' (pen.), 90+4' (pen.)	Report	Colaco 79'; Melwyn Fernandes 90+2'	Stadium: Raia Sports Complex; Referee: Fasil Salahudeen

==== Semi-finals ====
6 November 2014	Salgaocar	0–0 (5–4 p)	Bengaluru	Raia
		Report		Stadium: Raia Sports Complex; Referee: Maria Joseph
	Penalties
	(penalty scored) G. Oliveira; (penalty scored) Lamare; (penalty scored) Colaco; (penalty scored) Mundampara; (penalty scored) Duffy		(penalty scored) Walker; (penalty missed) Chhetri; (penalty scored) Udanta; (penalty scored) Lyngdoh; (penalty scored) Johnson

=== Puttaiah Memorial Cup ===
Bengaluru FC also participated in the local tournament, Puttaiah Memorial Cup, which they won by defeating ASC 8–1 in the final.

==== Quarter Final ====
12 December 2014 Quarter Final	RWF	0–1	Bengaluru FC	Bengaluru
15:30 IST		Report		Stadium: Bangalore Football Stadium

==== Semi Final ====
17 December 2014 Semi Final	Bengaluru FC	6-1	South United	Bengaluru
15:30 IST		Report		Stadium: Bangalore Football Stadium

==== Final ====
20 December 2014 Final	Bengaluru FC	8-1	ASC FC	Bengaluru
15:30 IST		Report		Stadium: Bangalore Football Stadium

== Accolades ==
Eugeneson Lyngdoh was awarded Best midfielder of I-League for 2014–15 in All India Football Federation awards.

== Player information ==
=== Squad information ===
No.	Name	Nationality	Position	Date of birth	Previous club
Goalkeepers
1	Pawan Kumar	(India)	GK	1 July 1990 (aged 24)	(India) Salgaocar
25	Soram Anganba	(India)	GK	24 December 1992 (aged 22)	(India) Pailan Arrows
28	Lalthuammawia Ralte	(India)	GK	7 June 1991 (aged 23)	(India) Shillong Lajong
30	Ricardo Cardozo	(India)	GK	14 January 1993 (aged 22)	(India) Tata Football Academy
Defenders
2	Nanjangud Shivananju Manju	(India)	CB	9 May 1987 (aged 28)	(India) United Sikkim
3	Vishal Kumar	(India)	RB	30 July 1992 (aged 22)	(India) Pailan Arrows
4	Curtis Osano	(England)	CB	8 March 1987 (aged 28)	(England) AFC Wimbledon
5	Gurtej Singh	(India)	CB	2 May 1990 (aged 25)	(India) Churchill Brothers
6	John Johnson	(England)	CB	16 September 1988 (aged 26)	(England) Northampton Town
13	Rino Anto	(India)	RB	3 January 1988 (aged 27)	(India) Mohun Bagan
20	Keegan Pereira	(India)	LB	7 November 1987 (aged 27)	(India) Salgaocar
23	Lalchhuan Mawia	(India)	LB	14 April 1989 (aged 26)	(India) Shillong Lajong
24	Manpreet Singh	(India)	DF	8 February 1989 (aged 26)	
Midfielders
8	Malemngamba Meetei	(India)	CAM	5 January 1992 (aged 23)	(India) Salgaocar
10	Josh Walker	(England)	CDM	21 February 1989 (aged 26)	(England) Gateshead
12	Thoi Singh	(India)	CM	5 October 1990 (aged 24)	(India) Mumbai Tigers
14	Eugeneson Lyngdoh	(India)	CM	10 September 1986 (aged 28)	(India) Rangdajied United
15	Darren Caldeira	(India)	CM	19 September 1987 (aged 27)	(India) Mumbai
16	Shankar Sampingiraj	(India)	CDM	14 December 1994 (aged 20)	(India) Pailan Arrows
18	Beikhokhei Beingaichho	(India)	RW	1 December 1992 (aged 22)	(India) East Bengal
19	Siam Hanghal	(India)	CM	26 May 1993 (aged 22)	(India) Pailan Arrows
31	C.K. Vineeth	(India)	RW	28 February 1988 (aged 27)	(India) United SC
32	Shilton D'Silva	(India)	MF	15 September 1992 (aged 22)	(India) Pailan Arrows
Attackers
7	Sean Rooney	(Australia)	ST	1 March 1989 (aged 26)	(Australia) Blacktown City FC
9	Robin Singh	(India)	ST	9 May 1990 (aged 25)	(India) East Bengal
11	Sunil Chhetri	(India)	ST	3 August 1984 (aged 30)	Sporting Portugal B
17	Karan Sawhney	(India)	ST	23 May 1992 (aged 23)	(India) Salgaocar
21	Udanta Singh	(India)	ST	14 June 1996 (aged 18)	(India) Tata Football Academy

=== Management ===
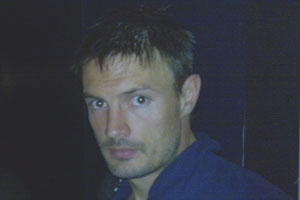
Ashley Westwood, the head coach Bengaluru FC for the 2014–15 season.

As of December 2014.

Position	Name
Head coach	(England) Ashley Westwood
Assistant coach	(Scotland) Pradhyum Reddy
Goalkeeping coach	(Turkey) Ali Uzunhasanoglu
Performance coach	(England) Malcolm Purchase
Head of Youth Development	(India) Richard Hood
Head physiotherapist	(England) Stephen Corner

== Player statistics ==
=== Appearances and goals ===
No.	Pos	Nat	Player	Total		I-League		Federation Cup		AFC	
No.	Pos	Nat	Player	Apps	Goals	Apps	Goals	Apps	Goals	Apps	Goals
1	GK	(India) IND	Pawan Kumar	0	0	0+0	0	0+0	0	0+0	0
2	DF	(India) IND	Nanjangud Shivananju Manju	4	0	1+1	0	0+0	0	1+1	0
3	DF	(India) IND	Vishal Kumar	3	0	0+2	0	0+0	0	1+0	0
4	DF	(Kenya) KEN	Curtis Osano	33	1	19+0	1	6+0	0	8+0	0
5	MF	(India) IND	Gurtej Singh	6	0	1+1	0	0+0	0	2+2	0
6	DF	(England) ENG	John Johnson	31	1	19+0	1	6+0	0	6+0	0
7	FW	(Australia) AUS	Sean Rooney	29	6	17+0	4	6+0	2	4+2	0
8	MF	(India) IND	Malemngamba Meetei	4	0	0+2	0	0+0	0	1+1	0
9	FW	(India) IND	Robin Singh	30	9	10+8	6	1+5	2	5+1	1
10	MF	(England) ENG	Josh Walker	30	3	17+0	2	6+0	0	7+0	1
11	FW	(India) IND	Sunil Chhetri	32	11	16+4	2	6+0	6	4+2	3
12	MF	(India) IND	Thoi Singh	24	5	13+3	5	4+0	0	4+0	0
13	DF	(India) IND	Rino Anto	31	1	17+1	1	6+0	0	7+0	0
14	MF	(India) IND	Eugeneson Lyngdoh	31	8	20+0	6	5+0	1	4+2	1
15	MF	(India) IND	Darren Caldeira	3	0	0+0	0	1+1	0	1+0	0
16	MF	(India) IND	Shankar Sampingiraj	19	3	11+2	2	0+1	0	4+1	1
17	FW	(India) IND	Karan Sawhney	0	0	0+0	0	0+0	0	0+0	0
18	MF	(India) IND	Beikhokhei Beingaichho	26	2	8+5	2	4+2	0	7+0	0
19	MF	(India) IND	Siam Hanghal	12	0	0+2	0	2+1	0	3+4	0
20	DF	(India) IND	Keegan Pereira	16	0	8+0	0	5+0	0	3+0	0
21	FW	(India) IND	Udanta Singh	13	1	2+8	0	0+0	0	2+1	1
23	DF	(India) IND	Lalchhuan Mawia	26	0	13+3	0	1+4	0	5+0	0
25	MF	(India) IND	Niroshan Mani	0	0	0+0	0	0+0	0	0+0	0
28	GK	(India) IND	Lalthuammawia Ralte	34	0	20+0	0	6+0	0	8+0	0
29	GK	(India) IND	Soram Anganba	0	0	0+0	0	0+0	0	0+0	0
30	GK	(India) IND	Ricardo Cardozo	0	0	0+0	0	0+0	0	0+0	0
31	MF	(India) IND	C.K. Vineeth	26	4	8+10	3	1+2	0	1+4	1
32	MF	(India) IND	Shilton D'Silva	0	0	0+0	0	0+0	0	0+0	0

- Source: soccerway

Updated: 31 May 2015

=== Top scorers ===
Rank	No.	Pos	Nat	Player	I-League	AFC	Federation Cup	Durand Cup	Total
1	11	FW	(India)	Sunil Chhetri	2	3	6	3	14
2	9	FW	(India)	Robin Singh	6	1	2	0	9
2	14	MF	(India)	Eugeneson Lyngdoh	6	1	1	1	9
4	7	FW	(Australia)	Sean Rooney	4	0	2	0	6
5	12	MF	(India)	Thoi Singh	5	0	0	0	5
6	31	MF	(India)	C.K. Vineeth	3	1	0	0	4
7	10	MF	(England)	Josh Walker	2	1	0	0	3
7	16	MF	(India)	Shankar Sampingiraj	2	1	0	0	3
9	18	MF	(India)	Beikhokhei Beingaichho	2	0	0	0	2
10	4	DF	(Kenya)	Curtis Osano	1	0	0	0	1
10	6	DF	(England)	John Johnson	1	0	0	0	1
10	13	DF	(India)	Rino Anto	1	0	0	0	1
10	21	FW	(India)	Udanta Singh	0	1	0	0	1
TOTALS					35	9	11	4	59

Source: soccerway
Updated: 31 May 2015

=== Clean sheets ===
Rank	No.	Pos	Nat	Player	I-League	AFC	Federation Cup	Durand Cup	Total
1	28	GK	(India)	Lalthuammawia Ralte	8	2	2	1	13

Source: soccerway
Updated: 31 May 2015

=== Disciplinary record ===
Rank	No.	Pos	Nat	Player	I-League		AFC		Total	
Rank	No.	Pos	Nat	Player	Yellow card	Red card	Yellow card	Red card	Yellow card	Red card
1	9	FW	(India)	Robin Singh	7	1	1	0	8	1
2	6	DF	(England)	John Johnson	4	0	1	0	5	0
2	12	MF	(India)	Thoi Singh	3	0	2	0	5	0
4	14	MF	(India)	Eugeneson Lyngdoh	4	0	0	0	4	0
4	23	DF	(India)	Lalchhuan Mawia	2	0	2	0	4	0
6	4	DF	(Kenya)	Curtis Osano	1	1	1	0	2	1
6	7	FW	(Australia)	Sean Rooney	1	0	2	0	3	0
6	13	DF	(India)	Rino Anto	3	0	0	0	3	0
6	16	MF	(India)	Shankar Sampingiraj	2	0	1	0	3	0
10	11	FW	(India)	Sunil Chhetri	2	0	0	0	2	0
11	10	MF	(England)	Josh Walker	0	0	1	0	1	0
11	18	MF	(India)	Beikhokhei Beingaichho	0	0	1	0	1	0
11	19	MF	(India)	Siam Hanghal	0	0	1	0	1	0
11	28	GK	(India)	Lalthuammawia Ralte	1	0	0	0	1	0
11	31	MF	(India)	C.K. Vineeth	1	0	0	0	1	0
TOTALS					31	2	13	0	44	2

Source: soccerway
Updated: 31 May 2015

== International caps ==
Players called for senior international duty during the 2014–15 season while under contract with Bengaluru FC.

Nationality	Position	Player	Competition	Date	Contribution	Opponent
India	FW	Sunil Chhetri	Friendly	6 October 2014	Started, played the full match, scored in 32nd minute.	v Palestine
India	FW	Robin Singh	Friendly	6 October 2014	Started, played the full match.	v Palestine
India	FW	Sunil Chhetri	2018 FIFA World Cup qualification (AFC)	12 March 2015	Started, played the full match, scored in 53rd and 71st minutes.	v Nepal
India	FW	Robin Singh	2018 FIFA World Cup qualification (AFC)	12 March 2015	Started, played for 92 minutes.	v Nepal
India	MF	Eugeneson Lyngdoh	2018 FIFA World Cup qualification (AFC)	12 March 2015	Started, played the full match	v Nepal
India	FW	Sunil Chhetri	2018 FIFA World Cup qualification (AFC)	17 March 2015	Started, played the full match	v Nepal
India	FW	Robin Singh	2018 FIFA World Cup qualification (AFC)	17 March 2015	Started, played the full match	v Nepal
India	MF	Eugeneson Lyngdoh	2018 FIFA World Cup qualification (AFC)	17 March 2015	Started, played 87 minutes	v Nepal

== See also ==
- 2014–15 in Indian football
