= List of Indian Arrows seasons =

Indian Arrows is an AIFF developmental club based which plays in I-League. The club was formed in 2010 as AIFF XI before being renamed as Pailan Arrows in 2011.

Indian Arrows have never won the League championship, and the Federation Cup.

== Seasons ==
Results of league and cup competitions by season
Season	Division	P	W	D	L	F	A	Pts	Pos	Federation Cup	Name	Goals
Season	League									Federation Cup	Top goalscorer	
2010–11	IL	26	7	8	11	31	49	29	9th	Group stage	Jeje Lalpekhlua	13
2011–12	IL	26	2	10	14	17	40	16	13th	Group stage	Chinadorai Sabeeth	9
2012–13	IL	26	6	5	15	25	45	18	12th	Group stage	Holicharan Narzary	4
2012–13	IL	26	6	5	15	25	45	18	12th	Group stage	Milan Singh	4
2017–18	IL	18	4	3	11	13	24	15	10th	—	Abhijit Sarkar	4
2018–19	IL	20	6	3	11	19	28	21	8th	—	Rohit Danu	4
2019–20	IL	14	2	3	9	7	17	9	11th	—	Vikram Pratap Singh	4
