= Suranjit =

Suranjit is a name. Notable people associated with the name include:

- Suranjit Sengupta
- Suranjit Singh Telem
