= 2019–20 Indian Arrows season =

Indian football club season

Indian Arrows
2019–20 season
- Manager: Shanmugam Venkatesh
- Stadium: Tilak Maidan; Cooperage Ground
- I-League: 11th
- Top goalscorer: Vikram Pratap Singh (4 goals)
- Highest home attendance: 2,512 vs East Bengal FC
- Lowest home attendance: 150 vs Real Kashmir FC
- Average home league attendance: 1,232
Home colours	Away colours

The 2019–20 season is Indian Arrows' 6th competitive season in the top-flight of Indian football, I-league. Indian Arrows was formed in 2010 on the behest on then Indian team coach, Bob Houghton, with the main goal of nurturing young talent in India in the hope of qualifying for 2018 FIFA World Cup in Russia. It was disbanded by AIFF in 2013 when their club sponsor, Pailan Group, could not financially support the group. But revived again in 2017-18 season immediately after FIFA U-17 World Cup.

== Technical staff ==
Position	Name
Head Coach	(India) Shanmugam Venkatesh
Team Manager	(India) Velu Dhayalamani
Assistant Coach	(India) Mahesh Gawli
Goalkeeping Coach	(India) Hameed
Team Analyst	(India) Prashanth Murthy
Physiotherapist	(India) Sulthan Basheer

== Squad ==
No.	Name	Nationality	Date of birth (age)
Goalkeepers
1	Lalbiakhlua Jongte	(India)	23 July 2002 (age 23)
13	Samik Mitra	(India)	1 December 2000 (age 25)
22	Tamal Naskar	(India)	30 January 2000 (age 26)
Defenders
2	Ajin Tom	(India)	29 January 2000 (age 26)
3	Harpreet Singh	(India)	1 November 2002 (age 23)
4	Akash Mishra	(India)	27 November 2001 (age 24)
5	Hendry Antonay	(India)	22 May 2000 (age 25)
12	Saurabh Meher	(India)	12 January 2000 (age 26)
15	Joseph Lalsangluara	(India)	7 October 1999 (age 26)
16	Bikash Yumnam	(India)	6 September 2003 (age 22)
20	Ruivah Hormipam	(India)	5 January 2001 (age 25)
26	Gurkirat Singh	(India)	16 July 2003 (age 22)
30	Surya Tirkey	(India)	28 July 1998 (age 27)
Midfielders
6	Vikram Pratap Singh	(India)	16 January 2002 (age 24)
10	Givson Singh	(India)	5 June 2002 (age 23)
14	Ricky John Shabong	(India)	29 December 2002 (age 23)
21	Telem Suranjit Singh	(India)	1 May 1999 (age 26)
27	Ayush Adhikari	(India)	30 July 2000 (age 25)
31	Lalliansangla Renthlei	(India)	5 June 1999 (age 26)
Forwards
7	Gurkirat Singh	(India)	16 July 2003 (age 22)
9	Aman Chetri	(India)	6 July 2001 (age 24)
11	Rohmingthanga Bawlte	(India)	2 January 1999 (age 27)
17	Harmanpreet Singh	(India)	2 September 2001 (age 24)
19	Lalchhanhmia Sailo	(India)	3 May 2003 (age 22)
26	Manvir Singh	(India)	15 June 2001 (age 24)
34	Suraj Rawat	(India)	15 March 1999 (age 26)

Last updated: 04 January 2020
Source: Indian Arrows First Team

== Competitions ==
=== Overview ===
Competition	First match	Last match	Final position	Record							
Competition	First match	Last match	Final position	Pld	W	D	L	GF	GA	GD	Win %
I-League	6 December 2019	8 March 2020	11th	16	2	3	11	7	20	−13	12.50
Total				16	2	3	11	7	20	−13	12.50

Source: Competitions

=== I-League ===
==== League table ====
Pos	Team	Pld	W	D	L	GF	GA	GD	Pts
7	Chennai City	15	5	5	5	20	21	−1	20
8	Churchill Brothers	15	6	2	7	23	21	+2	20
9	NEROCA	16	5	3	8	27	35	−8	18
10	Aizawl	15	3	7	5	17	19	−2	16
11	Indian Arrows	16	2	3	11	7	20	−13	9

Source: I-league, RSSSF
Rules for classification: 1) points; 2) head-to-head points; 3) head-to-head goal difference; 4) goal difference; 5) number of goals scored; 6) drawing of lots

== Results & Schedule ==
Win Draw Loss

6 December 2019 1	Indian Arrows	0-1	Gokulam Kerala FC	Goa
			Henry Kisekka 49'	Stadium: Tilak Maidan Stadium; Attendance: 1,618

9 December 2019 2	Aizawl FC	1-2	Indian Arrows	Goa
	Vikram Pratap Singh 81'		W.Lalnunfela 64'; Zoherliana 90+4'	Stadium: Tilak Maidan Stadium; Attendance: 1,217

16 December 2019 3	Punjab FC	1-0	Indian Arrows	Punjab
	Dipanda Dicka 80'			Stadium: Guru Nanak Stadium

28 December 2019 4	Churchill Brothers	1-2	Indian Arrows	Goa
	Abu Bakr 42'		Gurkirat Singh 78'; Telem Suranjit Singh 90'	Stadium: Fatorda Stadium

5 January 2020 5	Indian Arrows	1-1	NEROCA FC	Goa
	Sushil Meitei 24'		Vikram Pratap Singh 42'	Stadium: Tilak Maidan Stadium; Attendance: 250

9 January 2020 6	Mohun Bagan	1-0	Indian Arrows	Kalyani
	Nicholas Cyrus 18'			Stadium: Kalyani Stadium; Attendance: 10938

12 January 2020 7	Indian Arrows	0-2	TRAU F.C.	Goa
			Naocha Singh 45' Princewell Emeka 79'	Stadium: Tilak Maidan Stadium; Attendance: 500

26 January 2020 8	Indian Arrows	0-2	Real Kashmir F.C.	Goa
			Mason Robertson 18', Gnohere Krizo 57'	Stadium: EMC Corporation Stadium; Attendance: 150; Referee: M Sugandar

1 February 2020 9	East Bengal F.C.	0-1	Indian Arrows	Kalyani
			Vikram Pratap Singh 59'	Stadium: Kalyani Stadium; Attendance: 6340; Referee: Ibungo Meetei Ningthoukhongjam

5 February 2020 10	Chennai City F.C.	1-0	Indian Arrows	Coiambatore
	Katsumi Yusa 49'			Stadium: Nehru Stadium; Attendance: 2457; Referee: Sumiraj Poorathil Sudhakaran

11 February 2020 11	NEROCA F.C.	0-0	Indian Arrows	Imphal
				Stadium: Khuman Lampak Stadium; Attendance: 15363; Referee: Tanmoy Dhar

17 February 2020 12	Indian Arrows	1-3	East Bengal F.C.	Goa
	Vikram Pratap Singh 59'		Jamie Santos Colado 5' Asheer Akhtar 62' Lalrindika Ralte 67'	Stadium: Cooperage Stadium; Attendance: 2512; Referee: Rahul Kumar Gupta

24 February 2020 13	Real Kashmir F.C.	1-0	Indian Arrows	Srinagar
	Bazie Armand 70'			Stadium: TRC Ground; Attendance: 10152; Referee: Ravindra Thapliyal

28 February 2020 14	Indian Arrows	0-2	Chennai City F.C.	Goa
			Adolfo Miranda Araujo 48'Katsumi Yusa 60 '	Stadium: Cooperage Stadium; Attendance: 2472; Referee: Crystal John

3 March 2020 15	Indian Arrows	1-1	Punjab F.C.	Goa
	Givson Singh 90+3'		Dipanda Dicka 6'	Stadium: Cooperage Stadium; Attendance: 1125; Referee: Pranjal Banerjee

8 March 2020 16	TRAU F.C.	1-0	Indian Arrows	Imphal
	Deepak Devrani 89'			Stadium: Khuman Lampak Stadium; Attendance: 9682; Referee: Tanmoy Dhar

17	Gokulam Kerala F.C.	abandoned	Indian Arrows	Kozhikode
				Stadium: EMS Stadium

18	Indian Arrows	abandoned	Mohun Bagan	Goa
				Stadium: Tilak Maidan Stadium

19	Aizawl F.C.	abandoned	Indian Arrows	Aizawl
				Stadium: Rajiv Gandhi Stadium

20	Indian Arrows	abandoned	Churchill Brothers	Goa
				Stadium: Tilak Maidan Stadium

== Statistics ==
=== Goal Scorers ===
Goal Scorers for Indian Arrows in 2019–20 season
Rank	No.	Pos.	Name	Goals
1	6	MF	Vikram Pratap Singh	4
2	7	MF	Moirangthem Givson Singh	2
3	21	MF	Telem Suranjit Singh	1
			Own goals	0
Total				7
