= Eugeneson Lyngdoh =

Indian footballer (born 1986)

Member of the Meghalaya Legislative Assembly
- In office 2021–2023
- Preceded by: Syntar Klas Sunn
- Constituency: Mawphlang

Personal details
- Born: 10 September 1986 (age 40) Shillong, Meghalaya, India
- Parent: Syntar Klas Sunn

Eugeneson Lyngdoh
Personal information
- Date of birth: 10 September 1986 (age 40)
- Place of birth: Shillong, Meghalaya, India
- Height: 1.75 m (5 ft 9 in)
- Position: Central midfielder

Senior career*
Years	Team	Apps	(Gls)
2006–2011	Rangdajied United	70	(18)
2011–2013	Shillong Lajong	32	(4)
2013–2014	Rangdajied United	19	(2)
2014–2017	Bengaluru FC	77	(17)
2015–2016	→ Pune City (loan)	13	(3)
2017–2019	ATK	10	(0)
2019–2020	Bengaluru FC	2	(0)
2020	East Bengal	2	(0)
Total		225	(44)

International career^{‡}
2015–2017	India	24	(0)
- * Club domestic league appearances and goals as of 12:58, 11 December 2020 (UTC) ‡ National team caps and goals as of 17:22, 14 November 2017 (UTC)

Eugeneson Lyngdoh (born 10 September 1986) is an Indian former footballer who last played as a midfielder for Indian Super League side East Bengal. He has also represented the India national team.

== Early life ==
Lyngdoh studied at Bishop Cotton Boys' School, Bangalore. He was pursuing a degree in Electronics and Telecommunication Engineering, but abandoned it in the third year to focus on football.

== Club career ==
=== Shillong Lajong ===
Lyngdoh signed for Shillong Lajong in 2011 from Rangdajied United, who were then known as Ar-Hima, for whom he was the captain in the last season. He finished as the top scorer for Lajong during the 2011-12 I-League scoring 4 times. He then went on to make 23 I-League appearances for Lajong during the 2012-13 I-League season.

=== Rangdajied United ===
After spending 2 years with Shillong Lajong, Lyngdoh re-signed for Rangdajied United and made his debut in the I-League on 22 September 2013 against Prayag United at the Salt Lake Stadium, playing the full match as Rangdajied lost 0–2. He made 19 I-League appearances for Rangdajied.

=== Bengaluru FC ===
==== 2014–15 ====
In July 2014 Lyngdoh signed a one-year deal with I-League winners Bengaluru FC. Lyngdoh scored his first goal for Bengaluru during the 2014 Durand Cup, in a game against Mohammedan. Eugene then scored his second goal in the 2014–15 Federation Cup semi-final against Sporting Goa in a 3–0 win. Eugene kept up his high level of performances and scored Bengaluru FC's first goal of the 2014-15 I-League in a disappointing 1–3 defeat at home to Pune, with an outstanding finish. He scored again, this time in the 4th round of the season against Royal Wahingdoh in a 4–0 away win in Shillong. Eugene then created history by scoring Bengaluru FC's first ever goal in Asian continental club competition in an AFC Champions League qualifier against Johor Darul Ta'zim of Malaysia in a 2–1 loss, directly from a corner. By scoring against Johor, he became the first player from an I-League club to score in all four club competitions in the season. He assisted club captain Sunil Chhetri during an away game at Mohun Bagan for Bengaluru's opener, but couldn't prevent his team from going down 4–1 at Kolkata. Lyngdoh assisted Josh Walker in a 4–1 win against Sporting Goa on 31 March 2015 with a free-kick into the box, which was headed in for the first goal by the latter. He continued his fine form with another assist from a free-kick into the box for Shankar Sampingiraj to head home in a thrilling 3–3 draw at home to Royal Wahingdoh on 3 April 2015. He assisted Sampingiraj again, this time against Pune on 21 April 2015 with a cross from the left before scoring with a spectacular first time shot from outside the box, and assisting C.K. Vineeth on 24 April 2015 against Bharat FC. Lyngdoh augmented his statistics for the season with an assist from a free-kick into the box for Sean Rooney to head home against Shillong Lajong in a 1–1 away draw. On 17 May 2015, Lyngdoh assisted once and scored once against Salgaocar in a crucial 3–1 win for his team. Lyngdoh was involved in the last goal his team scored of the season, in the final round against Mohun Bagan, in a title-deciding match, assisting John Johnson from a corner, but couldn't help his team win in the game that ended 1–1, and thus losing out on the title. Lyngdoh was rewarded for an outstanding season, where he made 33 appearances in all competitions, scoring 9 times and assisting 16 times, when he was named Bengaluru FC Fan's Player of the Year and Player's Player of the Year, as well as being named the 2014–15 I-league Midfielder of the Season. Lyngdoh signed a 2-year extension to his contract that would keep him at Bengaluru FC until the end of 2016–17 season on 4 June 2015.

==== FC Pune City (loan) ====
Lyngdoh was signed by Indian Super League club Pune City on 10 July 2015 in the player drafts for Rs. 1.05 crore (US$214,431) for the 2015 Indian Super League. Pune City's manager David Platt praised Eugeneson for his technical ability and explained why the Pune-based franchise paid very high for his services. On 28 September 2015, he was named the "Football Player Association of India"s (FPAI) player of the year. Lyngdoh scored his first goal of the Indian Super League against FC Goa in his 5th game of the season, from a header in a 1–1 draw at Goa. He scored again on his 7th game of the season against FC Goa from a Didier Zokora pass. On 20 December 2015, Euegenson was voted by the coaches in the I-League as the best among the Indians, thus winning the "2015 AIFF Player of the Year".

=== ATK ===
Lyngdoh was picked up by ATK in the draft for the 2017–18 Indian Super League. Most of his time in the club was on the bench due to injury. The club decided to make a mutual contract termination, which materialised on 13 June 2019 between ATK and Lyngdoh.

=== East Bengal ===
Lyngdoh was signed by East Bengal Club for the 2020–21 Indian Super League. He played two games for the club before retiring to pursue a career in politics.

== International career ==
Eugeneson made his debut for India on 12 March 2015 against Nepal in the first leg of a two-legged 2018 FIFA World Cup pre-qualifier in a 2–0 win where he assisted the second goal.

== Career statistics ==
=== Club ===
As of 5 December 2020

Club	Season	League			Federation Cup		Durand Cup		AFC		Total	
Club	Season	Division	Apps	Goals	Apps	Goals	Apps	Goals	Apps	Goals	Apps	Goals
Shillong Lajong	2011–12	I-League	9	4	0	0	0	0	—	—	9	4
Shillong Lajong	2012–13	I-League	23	0	2	0	0	0	—	—	25	0
Rangdajied United	2013–14	I-League	19	2	3	0	0	0	—	—	22	2
Bengaluru	2014–15	I-League	20	6	5	1	3	1	6	1	34	9
Bengaluru	2015–16	I-League	8	3	2	1	—	—	8	2	18	6
Bengaluru	2016–17	I-League	15	1	5	1	—	—	5	0	25	2
Pune City (loan)	2015	Indian Super League	10	2	—	—	—	—	—	—	10	2
Pune City (loan)	2016	Indian Super League	3	1	—	—	—	—	—	—	3	1
ATK	2017–18	Indian Super League	3	0	—	—	—	—	—	—	3	0
ATK	2018–19	Indian Super League	5	0	2 (Note: Appearances in the Super Cup)	0	—	—	—	—	7	0
Bengaluru	2019–20	Indian Super League	5	0	—	—	—	—	0	0	5	0
East Bengal	2020–21	Indian Super League	1	0	—	—	—	—	—	—	1	0
Career total			121	19	19	3	3	1	19	3	162	26

== Honours ==
Bengaluru FC

- 2014–15 Federation Cup
- 2015–16 I-League
- 2016–17 Federation Cup

India

- SAFF Championship: 2015
- Tri-Nation Series: 2017

Individual

- Bengaluru FC Fan's Player of the Year: 2014–15
- Bengaluru FC Player's Player of the Year: 2014–15
- I-League Midfielder of the Year: 2014–15
- Football Player Association of India (FPAI) Player of the Year: 2014–15
- AIFF Player of the Year: 2015

== Other activities ==
=== Political career ===
After his father Syntar Klas Sunn, the sitting MLA of Mawphlang constituency of the Meghalaya Legislative Assembly died, Eugeneson fought in the resulting by-elections and won the seat as a candidate of the United Democratic Party.

=== In AIFF technical committee ===
On 2 September 2022, Lyngdoh was elected as a member of the technical committee of the All India Football Federation.
