= Ashley Westwood (footballer, born 1976) =

English footballer and manager

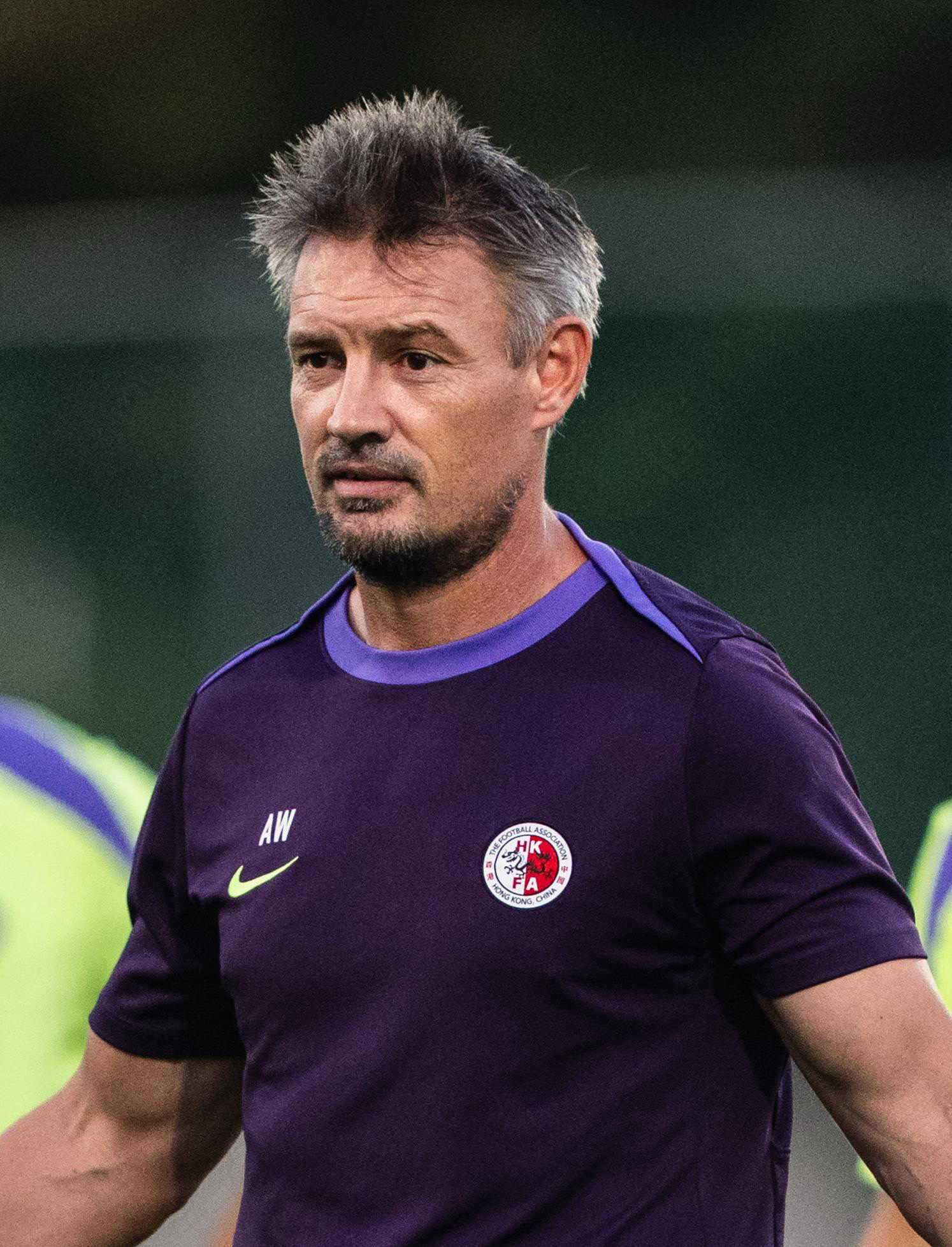
- Westwood in 2025

Personal information
- Full name: Ashley Michael Westwood
- Date of birth: 31 August 1976 (age 50)
- Place of birth: Bridgnorth, Shropshire, England
- Height: 5 ft 11 in (1.80 m)
- Position: Defender

Team information
- Current team: Kerala Blasters (head coach)

Youth career
- –1995: Manchester United

Senior career*
Years	Team	Apps	(Gls)
1995–1998	Crewe Alexandra	97	(9)
1998–2000	Bradford City	24	(2)
2000	→ Sheffield Wednesday (loan)	5	(1)
2000–2003	Sheffield Wednesday	77	(4)
2003–2006	Northampton Town	32	(2)
2006–2008	Chester City	21	(3)
2007	→ Swindon Town (loan)	9	(0)
2007	→ Port Vale (loan)	12	(0)
2008	Stevenage Borough	20	(2)
2008–2010	Wrexham	62	(3)
2010–2011	Kettering Town	12	(0)
2011	Crewe Alexandra	6	(0)
2011	Northampton Town	17	(1)
2012	Kettering Town	9	(1)
2012	Lincoln City	0	(0)
2012	Portsmouth	0	(0)
Total		403	(28)

Managerial career
- 2012: Kettering Town
- 2013–2016: Bengaluru
- 2016–2017: Penang
- 2018: ATK (caretaker)
- 2021–2022: RoundGlass Punjab
- 2023–2024: Afghanistan
- 2024–2025: Hong Kong
- 2026–: Kerala Blasters
- * Club domestic league appearances and goals

Ashley Michael Westwood (born 31 August 1976) is an English professional football manager and former player who is the head coach of Indian Super League club Kerala Blasters.

A graduate of the Manchester United Academy, the defender signed with Crewe Alexandra in 1995. Three years later, he moved on to Bradford City. Winning promotion to the Premier League with the Bantams, he transferred to Sheffield Wednesday in 2000. He moved on to Northampton Town in 2003, where he stayed for three years. Signing with Chester City in 2006, he was loaned to Swindon Town and Port Vale in 2007, before joining Wrexham via Stevenage Borough the following year.

He spent the 2010–11 season with Kettering Town before returning to Crewe Alexandra for a brief spell in 2011. Later in the year, he rejoined another former club, Northampton Town. In December 2011, he was released from the Cobblers after his contract had not been renewed. He was appointed player-caretaker manager at Kettering Town the following month before returning just to playing duties with Lincoln City in May 2012. Two months later, he became a player-coach at Portsmouth before becoming a full-time coach at Blackpool in November 2012. In his 18-year playing career, he scored 34 goals in 468 competitive appearances in the Football League and Conference. He was promoted four times with four clubs.

He began his full-time management career with the Indian club Bengaluru in 2013. He led them to two I-League titles (2013–14 and 2015–16) in three seasons, as well as the Indian Federation Cup in 2015. He was appointed head coach at Malaysia Super League club Penang in November 2016 but lasted just five months in the role. He was appointed as director of football at ATK in July 2017 and took over as head coach on an interim basis in January 2018. He was appointed as RoundGlass Punjab head coach in July 2021. He became the head coach of Afghanistan in November 2023 and then Hong Kong in August 2024.

== Playing career ==
=== Crewe Alexandra ===
Born in Bridgnorth, Westwood started his career as a trainee at Manchester United and was part of the FA Youth Cup winning side of 1995. He never made a first-team appearance for the Red Devils, but Dario Gradi spotted the youngster's potential and secured Westwood's services for Crewe Alexandra for a £40,000 fee.

Westwood slotted in well to the Second Division side. He played fifty games in the 1996–97 season, including the 1–0 win play-off final over Brentford that took the Railwaymen into the First Division. However, he was to only play 22 games in the 1997–98 season. His swansong for the Cheshire club came on 13 April 1998, when he scored the opener of a 2–0 win over near rivals Stoke City at Gresty Road.

=== Bradford City ===
In summer 1998, he signed with Bradford City, a tribunal later awarded Crewe a £150,000 payment from Bradford. His first season with the club saw the Bantams promoted to the Premier League as First Division runners-up. Westwood played only 19 games in their league campaign, though. His last game of the season was eventful, as he was sent off in stoppage time after scoring on 62 minutes at Loftus Road against Queens Park Rangers.

He played just five Premier League games in 1999–2000, though Bradford picked up 13 out of 15 points in those games, a sizeable chunk of their final tally of 36 points. The final of these games was a 3–0 win over Wimbledon at Valley Parade on 30 April 2000. This was a vital result because had the Dons won, they would have survived relegation at Bradford's expense. Westwood replaced Robbie Blake as a 67th minute substitute. He went into Europe in July 2000, making two appearances in the UEFA Intertoto Cup, victories over FK Atlantas and RKC Waalwijk. However, new manager Chris Hutchings told him to improve or leave.

=== Sheffield Wednesday ===
Westwood joined Sheffield Wednesday on a one-month loan in August; Paul Jewell had switched to the Owls and took Westwood with him permanently for £150,000 in September, £100,000 less than Bradford had originally wanted. He played 38 games that season, scoring five goals and picking up ten yellow cards. A particular highlight was scoring the winning goal as Wednesday knocked Premier League side West Ham United out of the League Cup. The next season Wednesday were fighting for First Division survival and Jewell had already left for Wigan Athletic. Westwood played 33 games, helping the club to the League Cup semi-finals. He began to suffer from a groin injury in October 2002, and played just 25 games in Wednesday's 2002–03 relegation season.

=== Northampton Town ===
In July 2003, he signed with Northampton Town. His time at Northampton was one ravaged by injury. He played just nine Third Division games in 2003–04, being out from September to January with a shoulder injury. He was sent off in the play-off semi-final first leg defeat to Mansfield Town. In July 2004, Westwood was appointed club captain. The 2004–05 season was the first season of League Two, and Westwood could only muster 19 league appearances following his return to action in October. He signed a new contract at the end of the year, despite still suffering from damaged knee ligaments, an injury he picked up in April. Once again Northampton reached the play-offs, only to exit at the semi-final stage, this time to Southend United. The Cobblers finally achieved promotion in 2005–06 as runners-up; Westwood played just three games all season, all as a substitute. He left Sixfields at the end of the campaign after not being offered a new contract, and instead signed for Mark Wright's Chester City.

=== Chester City ===
He continued to struggle with his hamstring. Though he played 25 games, he played his last in Chester colours after being injured against Wycombe Wanderers on 13 January 2007. In March, he joined Swindon Town on loan from the remainder of the season to provide much-needed cover for the Wiltshire club. The season ended with Westwood playing in a centre-back partnership with Jamie Vincent, helping Swindon to win promotion from League Two with a third-place finish. Westwood was placed on the transfer list at Chester by mutual consent in August 2007. He left the club on 30 August, to join League One side Port Vale on a temporary short-term deal. He made his Vale debut two days later in a 1–0 win at AFC Bournemouth. He returned to Chester in December 2007, before joining Stevenage Borough on a free transfer at the start of the 2008 January transfer window.

=== Non-League ===
He was released by Stevenage in July 2008, after making twenty appearances, scoring twice for the Conference side. After a trial with Lincoln City he joined Conference side Wrexham, becoming one of the first signings of new manager Dean Saunders, with whom Westwood played at Bradford City. He scored his first goal for the Dragons with a header in an FA Trophy game with Mansfield Town, to put them through to the second round. In July 2009 he signed a contract extension, keeping him at the Welsh club for the 2009–10 season. At the end of the season, Westwood moved to Kettering Town in order to be closer to his family.

Whilst at Kettering, he was sent off twice in two games, against Cambridge United and then Southport. Westwood left Kettering by mutual consent in January 2011 and was granted permission to train at his former club, Crewe Alexandra. The managing staff were impressed with his fitness levels and rewarded him with a short-term contract, keeping him at the club until the end of the season. He became the second Ashley Westwood in the squad, joining Ashley R. Westwood, 13 years his junior. He made six appearances but was not retained beyond the end of the campaign.

In August 2011 he agreed to spend a month on trial at former club Northampton Town, and quickly joined the club on non-contract terms. He scored the only goal for Northampton to secure three points at Aldershot Town on 13 August, his first start in his second spell at the club. Having made five appearances, he was given a contract lasting until the end of the year. He was released by new manager Aidy Boothroyd in December, having played 20 games for the struggling Northamptonshire club.

Conference National side Kettering Town underwent a financial crisis in 2011–12, and caretaker manager Mark Cooper walked out on the club on 18 January after his players went unpaid. Three days later, Westwood was announced as the club's temporary manager; he was also registered with the club as a player. Later that day, his new team lost 4–1 to Wrexham at the Racecourse Ground, having only been able to name two substitutes. The Poppies then won their next two games at Nene Park to move out of the relegation zone. After being told his job was secure until the end of the season, he picked himself to play for the first time in the 1–0 defeat at Hayes & Yeading on 10 March; also in March he signed Ben Joyce and Max York. Kettering failed to turn things around, and were relegated in last place having conceded 100 goals in 46 league games. In May 2012, he signed a one-year playing contract with Lincoln City, also in the Conference. Lincoln manager David Holdsworth reluctantly allowed Westwood to leave the club on 6 July 2012, having failing to kick a ball for the Imps.

On 6 July 2012, just over a month after signing for Lincoln, he accepted an offer by Michael Appleton to join the coaching staff at League One side Portsmouth. The club's financial situation meant that he was obliged to return to playing duties in the 2012–13 campaign. However, his only appearance was in a 3–0 League Cup defeat to Plymouth Argyle at Home Park on the opening day of the season; he was 12 years older than the team's second-oldest player Simon Eastwood.

== Coaching career ==
=== Assistant managerial roles ===
On 7 November 2012, Westwood followed manager Michael Appleton to Championship side Blackpool to work as first-team coach. On 11 January 2013, Westwood followed Appleton to become a coach at fellow Championship club Blackburn Rovers. He was sacked on 19 March 2013, at the end of Appleton's 67-day reign.

=== Bengaluru FC ===
On 2 July 2013, it was announced that Westwood had signed on as the very first head coach of the newly founded team Bengaluru FC in the Indian I-League. He made his debut as head coach on 25 August in a pre-season friendly 1–1 draw with the India national football team. Westwood then made his competitive coaching debut with Bengaluru on 22 September in his side's opening league game against Mohun Bagan A.C. at the Bangalore Football Stadium. His side drew the match 1–1, with Sean Rooney scoring the first-ever official goal in Westwood's reign. Westwood then coached Bengaluru to their first ever victory in their next match against Rangdajied United at the Bangalore Football Stadium in which goals from Sean Rooney, John Johnson, and Sunil Chhetri saw Bengaluru won the match 3–0. On 21 April 2014, Westwood led Bengaluru FC to the 2013–14 I-League title in their very first season by beating Dempo 4–2 at the Fatorda Stadium. In doing so Westwood became the youngest coach to win the I-League. However, on 24 April 2014, it was announced that Westwood would be suspended for four games after his unsporting behaviour during the match away to Mohun Bagan on 6 April.

"We won the league with players who were discarded by other clubs and this has made people envious and wondering how we managed it. People say we pay the most and that we have the biggest budget but that is a myth. I see people on television saying that it is easy for us to win with the budget we have but that's not fair. We negotiate hard and we sell the club to potential players as a way for improvement. People don't join for the money, you need competitive players who want to come because they want to better themselves. We are not Manchester City."

— Westwood speaking in an interview in May 2015.

They came close to defending their title in the 2014–15 campaign but were denied the title after conceding an 87th-minute equalising goal to Mohun Bagan on the final day of the season; the game finished as a 1–1 draw and preserved Mohun Bagan's two-point lead in the table. Bengaluru did though win the Indian Federation Cup, knocking out Salgaocar, Mohun Bagan, Shillong Lajong, Pune, and Sporting Clube de Goa, before beating Dempo 2–1 in the final at the Fatorda Stadium. They also progressed to the knock-out stages of the AFC Cup, exiting the competition at the Round of 16 with a 2–0 loss at South China.

Westwood led Bengaluru to the I-League title in 2015–16 with one game to spare. Despite the success Westwood was offered a new contract with reduced wages, and admitted that some in the club's hierarchy were "not on the same wavelength" as him. On 31 May 2016, Westwood parted ways with Bengaluru by mutual consent.

=== Penang FA ===
On 28 November 2016, it was announced that Westwood would take over as the head coach of Penang FA of the Malaysia Super League. However, his contract was cancelled by mutual consent on 19 March following a poor start to the 2017 season.

=== ATK ===
On 7 July 2017, Westwood was appointed director of football at Indian Super League side ATK. On 24 January 2018, head coach Teddy Sheringham was sacked, and Westwood was appointed as head coach on an interim basis. He took charge of seven games of the 2017–18 season, registering only one point, before Robbie Keane was appointed as the club's manager on 3 March.

=== RoundGlass Punjab ===
On 16 July 2021, Westwood joined I-League club RoundGlass Punjab as head coach. He resigned on 21 March 2022, partway through the 2021–22 season.

=== Afghanistan ===
On 8 November 2023, Westwood was appointed the head coach of the Afghanistan national team; at the time of his appointment, 18 players were boycotting the Afghanistan Football Federation due to allegations of corruption. Afghanistan finished fourth in their 2026 FIFA World Cup qualification group of Qatar, Kuwait and India.

=== Hong Kong ===
On 28 August 2024, Westwood was appointed the head coach of the Hong Kong national team on a two-year contract, with the goals of qualifying for the 2027 AFC Asian Cup for a second consecutive occasion and improving Hong Kong's world ranking.

In Westwood's first game in charge, Hong Kong lost 1–0 to Liechtenstein which ended the latter's 41-game winless run. Amid heavy criticism from Hong Kong supporters due to the loss, Westwood subsequently coached Hong Kong to a three-game winning streak – the team's first in eight years. The streak was further stretched to six games, a first since 1985, during which he led Hong Kong in qualifying for the 2025 EAFF Championship. Hong Kong finished third in the 2025 King's Cup with an 8–0 win over Fiji in the third-place play-off. They failed in qualification for the AFC Asian Cup after losing a crucial home game against Singapore having thrown away a first-half lead. He mutually agreed to leave the role shortly afterwards.

=== Kerala Blasters ===
On 27 March 2026, Westwood was appointed as the new head coach of Indian Super League club Kerala Blasters.

== Personal life ==
Westwood is a father of five, by three different women. His second wife was Huma Westwood, a former probation officer. His current partner is the Australian television sports journalist Mel McLaughlin.

On 25 April 2010, Westwood ran a red light and was stopped by a police officer in Northampton. He elbowed the officer in the face. He was prosecuted for refusing a breath test, assaulting a police officer, and the driving offence of running a red light. He was found guilty in October 2010. He was given 80 hours of unpaid work, banned from driving for one year, had three points put on his driving licence, and was ordered to pay the prosecution costs of £700.

== Career statistics ==
=== Playing statistics ===
Appearances and goals by club, season and competition
Club	Season	League			FA Cup		League Cup		Other		Total	
Club	Season	Division	Apps	Goals	Apps	Goals	Apps	Goals	Apps	Goals	Apps	Goals
Crewe Alexandra	1995–96	Second Division	33	4	7	1	4	0	9 (Note: Appearances in the Football League Trophy and play-offs.)	0	53	5
Crewe Alexandra	1996–97	Second Division	44	2	2	1	2	0	2 (Note: Appearances in the play-offs.)	0	50	3
Crewe Alexandra	1997–98	First Division	20	3	0	0	2	0	—		22	3
Crewe Alexandra	Total		97	9	9	2	8	0	11	0	125	11
Bradford City	1998–99	First Division	19	2	2	0	0	0	—		21	2
Bradford City	1999–2000	Premier League	5	0	1	0	1	0	—		7	0
Bradford City	2000–01	Premier League	0	0	0	0	0	0	2 (Note: Appearance(s) in the UEFA Intertoto Cup.)	0	2	0
Bradford City	Total		24	2	3	0	1	0	2	0	30	2
Sheffield Wednesday	2000–01	First Division	33	2	0	0	5	3	—		38	5
Sheffield Wednesday	2001–02	First Division	26	1	1	0	6	1	—		33	2
Sheffield Wednesday	2002–03	First Division	23	2	1	0	1	0	—		25	2
Sheffield Wednesday	Total		82	5	2	0	12	4	0	0	96	9
Northampton Town	2003–04	Third Division	10	0	1	0	0	0	0	0	11	0
Northampton Town	2004–05	League Two	19	2	2	0	0	0	0	0	21	2
Northampton Town	2005–06	League Two	3	0	0	0	0	0	0	0	3	0
Northampton Town	Total		32	2	3	0	0	0	0	0	35	2
Chester City	2006–07	League Two	21	3	2	0	1	0	1 (Note: Appearances in the Football League Trophy.)	0	25	3
Chester City	2007–08	League Two	0	0	0	0	0	0	0	0	0	0
Chester City	Total		21	3	2	0	1	0	1	0	25	3
Swindon Town (loan)	2006–07	League Two	9	0	—		—		—		9	0
Port Vale (loan)	2007–08	League One	12	0	1	0	—		1	0	14	0
Stevenage Borough	2007–08	Conference National	20	2	1	0	—		0	0	21	2
Wrexham	2008–09	Conference National	31	1	0	0	—		1 (Note: Appearance(s) in the FA Trophy.)	0	32	1
Wrexham	2009–10	Conference National	31	2	2	0	—		0	0	33	2
Wrexham	Total		62	3	2	0	0	0	1	0	65	3
Kettering Town	2010–11	Conference National	12	0	0	0	—		0	0	12	0
Crewe Alexandra	2010–11	League Two	6	0	—		—		—		6	0
Northampton Town	2011–12	League Two	17	1	1	0	1	0	1	0	20	1
Kettering Town	2011–12	Conference National	9	1	0	0	—		0	0	9	1
Lincoln City	2012–13	Conference National	0	0	0	0	—		0	0	0	0
Portsmouth	2012–13	League One	0	0	0	0	1	0	0	0	1	0
Career total			403	28	24	2	24	4	17	0	468	34

== Managerial statistics ==
As of 18 May 2026

Managerial record by team and tenure
Team	From	To	Record					Ref.
Team	From	To	P	W	D	L	Win %	Ref.
Bengaluru	2 July 2013	31 May 2016	75	42	14	19	56.0	
Penang FA	28 November 2016	17 March 2017	10	1	2	7	10.0	
ATK (caretaker)	24 January 2018	4 March 2018	8	1	1	6	12.5	
RoundGlass Punjab	21 July 2021	23 March 2022	6	3	2	1	50.0	
Afghanistan	1 November 2023	27 August 2024	6	1	2	3	16.7	
Hong Kong	28 August 2024	24 November 2025	20	10	4	6	50.0	
Kerala Blasters	27 March 2026	Present	10	6	2	2	60.0	
Total			132	63	26	43	47.7	—

== Honours ==
=== Player ===
Crewe Alexandra

- Football League Second Division play-offs: 1997

Swindon Town

- Football League Two third-place promotion: 2006–07

=== Manager ===
Bengaluru

- I-League: 2013–14, 2015–16
- Federation Cup: 2014–15

Individual

- Football Players' Association of India Best Coach of the Season: 2013–14, 2015–16
