= Hormipam Ruivah =

Indian footballer (born 2001)

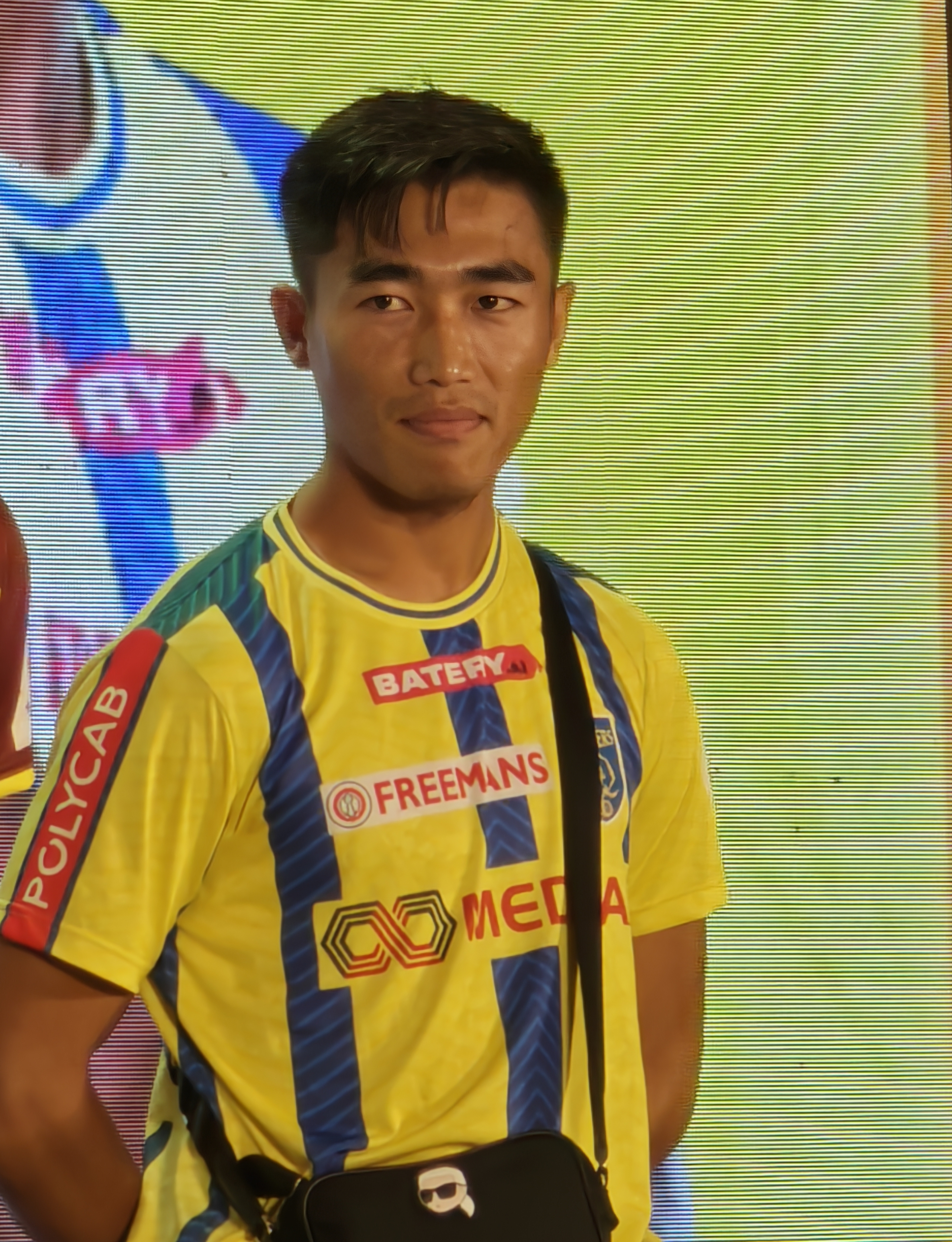
- Hormipam in 2024

Personal information
- Full name: Hormipam Ruivah
- Date of birth: 25 January 2001 (age 25)
- Place of birth: Shongran, Manipur, India
- Height: 1.83 m (6 ft 0 in)
- Positions: Centre-back; right back

Team information
- Current team: Kerala Blasters
- Number: 4

Youth career
- 2017–2018: SAI
- 2018–2019: Minerva Punjab

Senior career*
Years	Team	Apps	(Gls)
2019–2020	Indian Arrows	14	(0)
2020–2021	Roundglass Punjab	14	(0)
2021–	Kerala Blasters	77	(0)

International career^{‡}
2019	India U20	1	(0)
2021–2024	India U23	2	(0)
2022	India	1	(0)
- * Club domestic league appearances and goals as of 18 October 2026 ‡ National team caps and goals as of 19:45, 22 March 2024 (UTC)

Hormipam Ruivah (born 25 January 2001) is an Indian professional footballer who plays as a defender for Indian Super League club Kerala Blasters.

== Club career ==
=== Youth and early career ===
Hormipam hails from Somdal Village in the Ukhrul District of Manipur and has been playing football since his early childhood. He joined the SAI academy in 2017 and spend more than a year at the academy.

In 2018, Hormipam joined Minerva Punjab FC and went on to establish himself as a regular for their youth team. He was central to the dominant Minerva Punjab side that won their maiden Hero Elite League (U-18) title in the 2018–19 season.

Hormipam joined Indian Arrows on loan from Punjab FC in November 2019 and made his professional debut for the side in their first match of the season against Gokulam Kerala. He started and played the entire match as Indian Arrows lost 0–1. Hormipam played 14 matches for the Arrows during the 2019–20 I-League. He returned to Punjab FC for the 2020–21 I-League after the end of his loan spell at Arrows.

=== Kerala Blasters ===
On 8 April 2021, Hormipam joined Indian Super League club Kerala Blasters FC on a three-year deal which keep him up to 2024. He made his debut for the club on 11 September 2021 against Indian Navy in the Durand Cup, by coming in as a substitute for Abdul Hakku, who suffered an injury during the match.

He played his next Durand Cup match against Bengaluru on 15 September, where he received a red card and the Blasters lost match 2–0 against the arch-rivals. Hormipam made his ISL debut with the club on 19 December 2021 against the defending champions Mumbai City FC in a 3–0 victory.

He made seven clearances, five interceptions, five tackles and won every ground duel he participated in the match against Mumbai City and was appreciated by the media for his performance in his ISL debut. In the match against Jamshedpur FC on 10 February 2022, Hormipam was met with a head-clash with the goalkeeper, and was stretched-out of the game. Two days later, the Blasters gave a statement on his injury, where it was confirmed that he has sustained a nasal bone fracture and has undergone a surgery.

On 26 February, he came back to the pitch in the derby match against Chennaiyin FC, which they won 3–0. Hormipam eventually formed a formidable and successful partnership with Marko Lešković and emerged as one of the best centre back pairs in the league. His performance for the Blasters' 0–1 victory against Jamshedpur on 11 March in the first leg of the semi-final earned him the man of the match award. He was then awarded with ISL's 'Emerging Player of the Month' award for his performance in the month of March, and was also voted as the 'Hero of the Month' by the fans and experts for the same month.

After representing the club in their 2022–23 season, Hormipam signed a long-term contract extension with the Blasters until 2027 ahead of the 2023–24 season. Ruivah played his first match of the season on 13 August 2023 against Gokulam Kerala FC as a substitute for Bijoy Varghese in the 2023 Durand Cup, which they lost 3–4 at full-time. In the 2023–24 season, Hormipam faced competition from Pritam Kotal, who had arrived from Mohun Bagan, causing him to be pushed to the periphery of Ivan Vukomanović's main starting eleven.

== International career ==
After a fine season with Minerva Punjab, Hormipam was called up by the Indian U-18 side. He was part of the Indian team that won the 2019 SAFF U-18 Championship held at Nepal.

In 2021, Ruivah was included in the final squad of the India U-23 team that participated in the 2022 AFC U-23 Asian Cup qualification.

In March 2022, Ruivah was called up for the national squad by coach Igor Štimac ahead of India's two friendly matches against Bahrain and Belarus. He made his debut against Belarus on 26 March.

== Career statistics ==
=== Club ===
As of matches played till 11 october 2026

Appearances and goals by club, season and competition
Club	Season	League			Cup		Continental		Other (Note: Appearances in Durand Cup)		Total	
Club	Season	Division	Apps	Goals	Apps	Goals	Apps	Goals	Apps	Goals!	Apps	Goals
Indian Arrows	2019–20	I-League	14	0	—		—		—		14	0
Punjab	2020–21	I-League	14	0	—		—		—		14	0
Kerala Blasters	2021–22	Indian Super League	14	0	—		—		2	0	16	0
Kerala Blasters	2022–23	Indian Super League	20	0	2	0	—		—		22	0
Kerala Blasters	2023–24	Indian Super League	13	0	—		—		1	0	14	0
Kerala Blasters	2024–25	Indian Super League	18	0	—		—		0	0	18	0
Kerala Blasters	2025–26	Indian Super League	8	0	—		—		0	0	8	0
Kerala Blasters	2026–27	Indian Super League	1	0	—		—		0	0	1	0
Kerala Blasters	Kerala Blasters total		74	0	2	0	—		3	0	79	0
Career total			102	0	2	0	0	0	3	0	107	0

== Honours ==
Minerva Punjab

- Elite League: 2018–19

Kerala Blasters

- Indian Super League runner-up: 2021–22

India U18

- SAFF U-18 Championship: 2019

Individual

- Indian Super League Hero of the Month: March 2022
