= Des Bulpin =

Scottish football coach

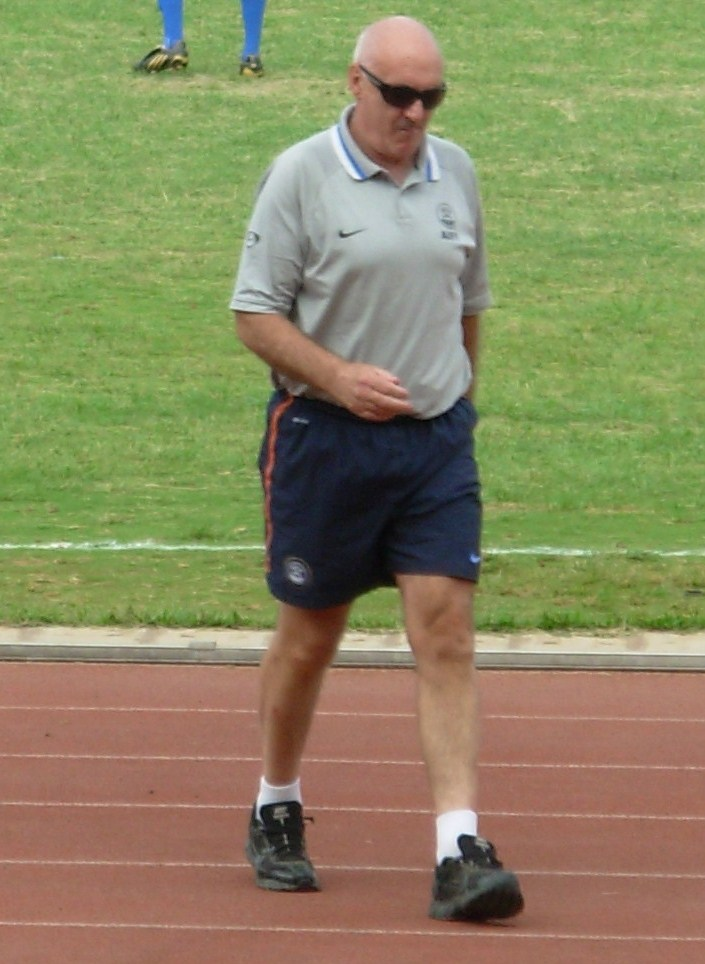
- Bulpin pictured in 2011

Personal information
- Full name: Desmond Donaldson Bulpin
- Date of birth: 31 March 1951 (age 75)
- Place of birth: Glasgow, Scotland

Managerial career
- Years: Team
- 2003: Tampines Rovers
- 2009–2010: Philippines
- 2010–2011: Indian Arrows
- 2010–2011: India U23
- 2012–2013: Shillong Lajong
- 2013-2014: Crystal Palace (U18's; assistant Manager)
- 2014–2015: Millwall (assistant head coach)

Desmond Donaldson Bulpin is a Scottish football coach who was most recently a first-team coach at EFL Championship side Millwall. He managed the Philippines national team between 2009 and 2010.

== Career ==
Bulpin obtained his prelim badge in 1980 with Roy Hodgson. After that, he was invited by Bob Houghton to work with the schoolboys at Bristol City. Des was then employed by Bobby Gould at Bristol Rovers as youth team coach, later as first team coach and reserve team manager. Other managers who have employed Bulpin are Gerry Francis, Ian Holloway, Andy Kilner, and David Burnside.

Des Bulpin has a solid record of identifying and developing young players such as Peter Crouch, Danny Dichio, Dougie Freedman, Kevin Gallen, Ledley King, Marcus Stewart, Steve Yates and many more. "Des Bulpin discovered me and along with my dad would be the biggest influence on my career," Peter Crouch says. "I remember him telling me when I was 15 that Jermain Defoe and I would play together for England when we were older and he hasn't been too far wrong. We're still in touch, and I'll always have time for Des."

Bulpin's career has seen him work for football clubs such as Tampines Rovers, Tottenham Hotspur, Queens Park Rangers, Bristol City, Bristol Rovers, Stockport County, Plymouth Argyle, and Leicester City. He has also had international positions in countries such as Singapore and Uzbekistan, where Bulpin was the former head coach of Tampines Rovers in the 2003 S.League season and the Uzbekistan U-17 football team. In November 2009, he was appointed as National Team Manager of the Philippines, signing an initial one-year deal. He said, "it's a massive challenge, but we have to get on with it." He also vowed to turn the team into an "organized team that pressures other teams, plays a high tempo and moves the ball quickly." In July 2010, he left his post with the Philippines to take over India's U-21 team which is fielded in the 2010–11 I-League season. His fellow Scottish successor Simon McMenemy would take the coaching position and they were accredited for the renaissance of Philippine football.

From the autumn of 2010, Bulpin was head coach of Indian Arrows, the national under-21 team in India, who fielded a team in the I-League. The average age of the team was 19 years. Six players of this team are currently in the national men's squad, coached and managed by Bob Houghton. On 23 April 2011, Bob Houghton handed in his immediate resignation as the India national team coach, which the AIFF accepted and then confirmed that Bulpin would remain in his position. He left Indian Arrows and his role with the under-23 team in August 2011. Bulpin joined Shillong Lajong as head coach in June 2012, having signed a two-year contract. He left the club in January 2013 after Shillong won three of their 17 league matches under his management.

Bulpin was appointed as manager of Crystal Palace's under-18 team in the summer of 2013.
