= Matthew Beyondstar Kurbah =

Indian politician

Matthew Beyondstar Kurbah (born 1965) is an Indian politician from Meghalaya. He is a member of the Meghalaya Legislative Assembly from the Mawphlang Assembly constituency, which is reserved for the Scheduled Tribe community, in East Khasi Hills district. He was first elected in the 2023 Meghalaya Legislative Assembly election representing the United Democratic Party.

In September 2026, Kurbah joined a major political realignment in the state, defecting from the United Democratic Party (UDP) alongside seven other legislators to merge with the Bharatiya Janata Party to boost infrastructure development in his constituency.

== Early life and education ==
Kurbah is from Sawlad Marbisu, East Khasi Hills district, Meghalaya. He is the son of Shrim Sun. He completed his Bachelor of Engineering degree in electrical engineering in 1988 at Dibrugarh University with first-class. He is a retired government employee at Meghalaya Energy Corporation Limited, and his wife is also in government service at MeECL.

== Career ==
Kurbah won the Mawphlang Assembly constituency representing the United Democratic Party in the 2023 Meghalaya Legislative Assembly election. He polled 6,690 votes and defeated his nearest rival, Auspicious Lyngdoh Mawphlang of the People's Democratic Front, by 104 votes.
