= Mawphlang Assembly constituency =

Legislative Assembly constituency in Meghalaya State, India

Coordinates: 25.45°N 91.76°E

Mawphlang
- Constituency No. 24 for the Meghalaya Legislative Assembly

Constituency details
- Country: India
- Region: Northeast India
- State: Meghalaya
- District: East Khasi Hills
- Lok Sabha constituency: Shillong
- Established: 2008
- Total electors: 35,484
- Reservation: ST

Member of Legislative Assembly
- 11th Meghalaya Legislative Assembly
- Incumbent Matthew Beyondstar Kurbah
- Party: BJP
- Alliance: NDA
- Elected year: 2023

Mawphlang is one of the 60 Legislative Assembly constituencies of Meghalaya state in India.

It is part of East Khasi Hills district and is reserved for candidates belonging to the Scheduled Tribes.

== Members of the Legislative Assembly ==
Year	Member	Party
2013	Kennedy Cornelius Khyriem	Indian National Congress
2018	Syntar Klas Sunn	Independent politician
2021 By-election	Eugeneson Lyngdoh (Note: Elected as United Democratic Party. Switched to BJP in Sept 2026)	United Democratic Party
2023	Matthew Beyondstar Kurbah	United Democratic Party

== Election results ==
=== Assembly Election 2023 ===
2023 Meghalaya Legislative Assembly election: Mawphlang
Party	Candidate	Votes	%	±%
UDP	Matthew Beyondstar Kurbah	6,690	21.50%	▼27.21
PDF	Auspicious Lyngdoh Mawphlang	6,586	21.17%	New
INC	Dannyson Kurbah	5,594	17.98%	▼14.60
VPP	Doristar Marbaniang	4,811	15.46%	New
NPP	Kennedy Cornelius Khyriem	4,733	15.21%	▼3.50
AITC	Mawkordor Rynjah	1,507	4.84%	New
BJP	Wossarroi Rani	1,196	3.84%	New
NOTA	None of the Above	142	0.46%	▼0.28
Margin of victory		104	0.33%	▼15.80
Turnout		31,117	87.69%	▼12.08
Registered electors		35,484		▲29.82
UDP hold		Swing	▼27.21	

=== Assembly By-election 2021 ===
This by-election was needed due to the death of sitting MLA, Syntar Klas Sunn of COVID-19, on 10 September 2021. The election, which was carried out on 30 October 2021, was won by his son, Eugeneson Lyngdoh.

2021 Meghalaya Legislative Assembly by-election: Mawphlang
Party	Candidate	Votes	%	±%
UDP	Eugeneson Lyngdoh	13,285	48.71%	New
INC	Kennedy Cornelius Khyriem	8,884	32.58%	▼6.90
NPP	Lamphrang Blah	5,103	18.71%	New
NOTA	None of the Above	202	0.74%	▼0.09
Margin of victory		4,401	16.14%	▲13.42
Turnout		27,272	100.52%	▲10.10
Registered electors		27,333		▼7.34
UDP gain from Independent		Swing	▲6.52	

=== Assembly Election 2018 ===
2018 Meghalaya Legislative Assembly election: Mawphlang
Party	Candidate	Votes	%	±%
Independent	Syntar Klas Sunn	11,162	42.19%	New
INC	Kennedy Cornelius Khyriem	10,444	39.48%	▼3.64
HSPDP	Pynshai Manik Syiem	3,940	14.89%	▲7.81
PDF	Dr. Donkupar Lyngdoh	391	1.48%	New
NOTA	None of the Above	219	0.83%	New
Margin of victory		718	2.71%	▼12.94
Turnout		26,454	89.68%	▲0.84
Registered electors		29,498		▲22.65
Independent gain from INC		Swing	▼0.92	

=== Assembly Election 2013 ===
2013 Meghalaya Legislative Assembly election: Mawphlang
Party	Candidate	Votes	%	±%
INC	Kennedy Cornelius Khyriem	9,212	43.12%	New
UDP	J. Antonius Lyngdoh	5,868	27.46%	New
Independent	Pynshai Manik Syiem	4,573	21.40%	New
HSPDP	Skor Jala	1,513	7.08%	New
Independent	Hamsya Chen	200	0.94%	New
Margin of victory		3,344	15.65%	
Turnout		21,366	88.84%	
Registered electors		24,050		
INC win (new seat)				

== See also ==
- List of constituencies of the Meghalaya Legislative Assembly
- East Khasi Hills district
