= Lalthuammawia Ralte =

Indian footballer

Personal information
- Date of birth: 28 November 1992 (age 33)
- Place of birth: Champhai, Mizoram, India
- Height: 1.77 m (5 ft 10 in)
- Position: Goalkeeper

Team information
- Current team: Bengaluru
- Number: 28

Senior career*
Years	Team	Apps	(Gls)
2011–2014	Shillong Lajong	40	(0)
2014–2018	Bengaluru	28	(0)
2015	→ NorthEast United (loan)	0	(0)
2018–2020	Goa	0	(0)
2019	→ Kerala Blasters (loan)	0	(0)
2019–2020	→ East Bengal (loan)	9	(0)
2020–2021	Bengaluru	1	(0)
2021–2022	Punjab	7	(0)
2022–2024	Odisha	1	(0)
2024–	Bengaluru	1	(0)
- * Club domestic league appearances and goals as of 22 October 2024 @ 15:46(AEST)

Lalthuammawia Ralte (born 28 November 1992), known as Mawia, is an Indian footballer who plays as a goalkeeper for Bengaluru.

== Career ==
=== Shillong Lajong ===
In the summer of 2011 Ralte signed with newly promoted club Shillong Lajong to play in the I-League. He then made his debut for the club against Churchill Brothers on 17 September 2011 in the 2011 Indian Federation Cup. The match ended 3–1 to Churchill. He helped the club then reach the semi-finals of the Federation Cup against Salgaocar where Lajong would lose 1–0 on 25 September 2011 at the Salt Lake Stadium in Kolkata.

=== Bengaluru FC ===
In the summer of 2014 Ralte joined defending I-League champions, Bengaluru FC. On 17 January 2015, Mawia made his debut for Bengaluru FC against Dempo at Bangalore Football Stadium in which he was able to kept his first clean sheet. In his debut season with Bengaluru, he has made 20 appearances and has helped them to win I-League. On 4 February 2015, Mawia made his AFC Champions League debut against Johor Darul Ta'zim at Larkin Stadium Malaysia. He signed a two-year contract with Bengaluru at the end of the season, which would keep him at the club until the end of the 2016-17 I-League season.

=== NorthEast United FC (loan) ===
In July 2015 Ralte was drafted to play for NorthEast United FC in the 2015 Indian Super League.

=== FC Goa ===
In January after zero games plays with FC Goa, he was loaned to Kerala Blasters FC.

=== Kerala Blasters FC ===
Ralte was signed in into the Blasters courtesy of swapping deal midway through the 2018–19 Indian Super League by FC Goa and them. Ralte was sent on loan to Blasters while then Kerala Blasters goalkeeper Naveen Kumar was sent on loan to FC Goa from Blasters. Still Ralte didn't feature in a single game for the club and returned to Goa after the loan period.

=== East Bengal FC (loan) ===
In June 2019 Ralte is drafted to play for East Bengal in the 2019-20 I-League season.

=== Bengaluru ===
In the summer of 2020 Ralte joined his former club and 2018-19 Indian Super League champions, Bengaluru.

=== Odisha ===
In July 2022, Odisha successfully signed Ralte on a two-year deal. On 17 August, he made his debut for the club against NorthEast United in the Durand Cup, in a thumping 6–0 win. He assisted Nandha Kumar for their second goal.

== Career statistics ==
=== Club ===
As of 13 April 2024

Club	Season	League			Cup		AFC		Total	
Club	Season	Division	Apps	Goals	Apps	Goals	Apps	Goals	Apps	Goals
Shillong Lajong	2011–12	I-League	6	0	4	0	—		10	0
Shillong Lajong	2012–13	I-League	23	0	0	0	—		23	0
Shillong Lajong	2013–14	I-League	12	0	1	0	—		13	0
Shillong Lajong	Total		41	0	5	0	0	0	46	0
Bengaluru	2014–15	I-League	20	0	7 (Note: 6 Appearances in Federation Cup and 1 Appearance in Durand Cup)	0	8 (Note: 1 Appearance in AFC Champions League and 8 Appearances in AFC Cup)	0	35	0
Bengaluru	2015–16	I-League	5	0	0	0	4 (Note: Appearance(s) in AFC Cup)	0	9	0
Bengaluru	2016–17	I-League	1	0	2 (Note: Appearance(s) in Federation Cup)	0	2	0	5	0
Bengaluru	2017–18	Indian Super League	2	0	0	0	10	0	12	0
Bengaluru	Total		28	0	9	0	24	0	61	0
NorthEast United (loan)	2015	Indian Super League	0	0	0	0	—		0	0
Goa	2018–19	Indian Super League	0	0	0	0	—		0	0
Kerala Blasters (loan)	2018–19	Indian Super League	0	0	0	0	—		0	0
East Bengal (loan)	2019–20	I-League	9	0	2 (Note: Appearance(s) in Durand Cup)	0	—		11	0
Bengaluru	2020–21	Indian Super League	1	0	0	0	0	0	1	0
RoundGlass Punjab	2021–22	I-League	7	0	0	0	—		7	0
Odisha	2022–23	Indian Super League	0	0	4 (Note: 3 Appearances in Durand Cup and 1 Appearance in Indian Super Cup)	0	—		4	0
Odisha	2023–24	Indian Super League	1	0	5 (Note: Appearances in Indian Super Cup)	0	0	0	6	0
Odisha	Total		1	0	9	0	0	0	10	0
Bengaluru	2024–25	Indian Super League	2	0	1	0	—		3	0
Bengaluru	2025–26	Indian Super League	0	0	0	0	—		0	0
Bengaluru	2026–27	Indian Super League	0	0	0	0	—		0	0
Bengaluru	Total		2	0	1	0	0	0	3	0
Career total			89	0	26	0	24	0	139	0

== Honours ==
Bengaluru

- Federation Cup: 2014–15, 2016–17
- I-League: 2015–16
- Super Cup: 2018
- Indian Super League runner-up: 2017–18
- ISL Cup runner-up: 2024–25

Odisha

- Super Cup: 2023; runner-up: 2024
