= 2018 IFA Shield =

২০১৮ আইএফএ শিল্ড

Tournament details
- Country: India
- Dates: 5–19 July 2018
- Teams: 20 (8 in final round)

Final positions
- Champions: East Bengal (29th title)
- Runners-up: Mohun Bagan

Tournament statistics
- Matches played: 15
- Goals scored: 57 (3.8 per match)

The 2018 IFA Shield was the 122nd edition of the IFA Shield. The tournament was designed as a U19 youth football tournament since 2015. 8 clubs participated in final round in the edition.

== Venue ==
All the matches were held at Barasat Stadium, East Bengal Ground, Mohun Bagan Ground and Howrah Stadium.

== Qualifying round ==
14 teams participated in the qualifying round and Bengal Football Academy as the winners of qualifiers. FC Pune City later withdrew from the tournament and were replaced by runners-up of qualifying round, SAIL (Burnpur) Academy.

== Final round ==
=== Group A ===
Pos	Team	Pld	W	D	L	GF	GA	GD	Pts	
1	East Bengal	3	3	0	0	13	1	+12	9	Advance to the semifinals
2	SAIL (Burnpur)	3	2	0	1	6	6	0	6	Advance to the semifinals
3	ATK	3	0	1	2	1	5	−4	1	
4	Mohammedan	3	0	1	2	1	9	−8	1	

Source: kolkatafootball.com

=== Group B ===
Pos	Team	Pld	W	D	L	GF	GA	GD	Pts	
1	Mohun Bagan	3	3	0	0	11	1	+10	9	Advance to the semifinals
2	Tata Football Academy	3	2	0	1	8	5	+3	6	Advance to the semifinals
3	Bengal Football Academy	3	1	0	2	5	7	−2	3	
4	Churchill Brothers	3	0	0	3	2	13	−11	0	

Source: kolkatafootball.com

== Semi-finals ==
16 July 2018
14:30 IST

East Bengal	4–1 (a.e.t.)	Tata Football Academy
T. Suranjit Singh 64'; Gurmukh Singh 114'; Dip Saha 120+1'; Jhantu Prasad 120+2'	Report	Chetan Hansdah 49'

East Bengal Ground
17 July 2018
14:30 IST

Mohun Bagan	2–1	SAIL (Burnpur)
Asif Ali Molla 25'; Subha Ghosh 85'	Report	Israfil Deewan 27'

Mohun Bagan Ground

== Final ==
19 July 2018
14:30

East Bengal	1–1 (a.e.t.)	Mohun Bagan
Dip Saha 83'	Report	Sourav Das 47'
Penalties
	4–2

Barasat Stadium
Attendance: 5000
