= Shankar Sampingiraj =

Indian footballer (born 1994)

Personal information
- Full name: Shankar Sampingiraj
- Date of birth: 14 December 1994 (age 31)
- Place of birth: Kolar, Karnataka, India
- Height: 1.85 m (6 ft 1 in)
- Positions: Centre-back; defensive midfielder

Team information
- Current team: SC Bengaluru
- Number: 16

Senior career*
Years	Team	Apps	(Gls)
2010–2011	HAL		
2011–2013	Pailan Arrows	0	(17)
2013	→ DSK Shivajians (loan)	6	(1)
2013–2016	Bengaluru	21	(3)
2015	→ Kerala Blasters (loan)	3	(0)
2017–2018	ATK	11	(0)
2018–2019	Pune City	4	(0)
2019–2020	Hyderabad	5	(0)
2021	Chennai City	12	(0)
2021–2023	Punjab	19	(0)
2023–2024	Bengaluru	7	(0)
2024–	SC Bengaluru	5	(0)

International career^{‡}
2014–2015	India U23	2	(0)
- * Club domestic league appearances and goals as of 12:43, 13 December 2024 (UTC) ‡ National team caps and goals as of 08:57, 1 April 2015 (UTC)

Shankar Sampingiraj (Kannada: ಶಂಕರ್ ಸಂಪಂಗಿರಾಜ್; born 14 December 1994) is an Indian professional footballer who plays as a defender or defensive midfielder for I-League club SC Bengaluru.

== Career ==
=== HAL ===
Born in Kolar, Karnataka, Sampingiraj started his professional career with HAL, then of I-League during the 2010–11 season. However, during a match against Pune the very same season, Sampingiraj suffered a ligament tear which was not properly diagnosed by his club, but was noticed and dealt with at the camp for the Indian national youth team, eventually leading to surgery on his right knee and missing substantial game time.

=== Pailan Arrows and DSK Shivajians ===
Sampingiraj signed for the Pailan Arrows then of I-League for the 2011-12 I-League season. Shankar was loaned out to DSK Shivajians of the I-League 2nd Division for the 2013 I-League 2nd Division, playing all six of DSK's group stage games, scoring once against Kohima Komets, but couldn't help his team reach the final round.

=== Bengaluru ===
In July 2013, it was announced that Sampingiraj had signed with new direct-entry I-League side Bengaluru FC. However, the All India Football Federation stopped Sampingiraj from joining the team as they said that he was still contracted with them to play for Pailan Arrows. Then, on 13 December 2013, it was announced than Sampingiraj had eventually signed with Bengaluru FC but on loan from IMG-Reliance for the rest of the season.

Sampingiraj scored his first goal for Bengaluru FC in an AFC Cup game on 24 February 2015, against Maziya of the Maldives in a 2–1 away, in added-time. Shankar scored his first goal in the I-League for Bengaluru on 3 April 2015, heading in a free-kick into the box from Eugeneson Lyngdoh in a 3–3 draw with Royal Wahingdoh. He signed a 3-year contract with Bengaluru at the end of the season; this deal will take keep him with the club until the end of the 2017-18 I-League season.

==== Kerala Blasters (loan) ====
In July 2015, Sampingiraj was drafted to play for Kerala Blasters FC in the 2015 Indian Super League. On 13 August 2013, Bengaluru, his parent club, confirmed a 3-week training stint for Shankar with Italian 3rd division side Unione Sportiva Cremonese, prior to the 2015 ISL.

==== Chennai City ====
In 2020, he moved to Chennai City on a one-year deal.

== International ==
Sampingiraj made his Indian U23 debut against Uzbekistan U23 on 27 March 2015 in a 2016 AFC U-23 qualifier in the Bangabandhu National Stadium in Bangladesh. Shankar started and was sent-off against Syria U23 in the second match of the qualifiers in a 4–0 loss.

== Career statistics ==
As of 2 March 2016

Club	Season	League			Federation Cup		Durand Cup		AFC		Total	
Club	Season	League	Apps	Goals	Apps	Goals	Apps	Goals	Apps	Goals	Apps	Goals
Bengaluru FC	2013–14	I-League	0	0	0	0	0	0	—	—	0	0
Bengaluru FC	2014–15	I-League	13	2	1	0	0	0	3	1	17	3
Bengaluru FC	2015–16	I-League	7	0	0	0	0	0	0	0	7	0
Kerala Blasters (loan)	2015	Indian Super League	3	0	—	—	—	—	—	—	3	0
Career total			23	2	1	0	0	0	3	1	27	3
