= Syntar Klas Sunn =

Indian politician (1958–2021)

Syntar Klas Sunn (10 December 1958 – 10 September 2021) was an Indian politician and football administrator from Meghalaya.

He was elected to the Meghalaya Legislative Assembly from East Khasi Hills district's Mawphlang assembly constituency in 2018 as an Independent politician but later joined the United Democratic Party.

Sunn died from COVID-19 in 2021.
