= Alber Gonsalves =

Indian footballer (born 1992)

Personal information
- Position: Midfielder

Senior career*
Years	Team	Apps	(Gls)
2014	SESA FA	9	(5)
2015–2016	Sporting Goa	8	(1)
2016–2018	Fateh Hyderabad		(1)
- * Club domestic league appearances and goals as of 28 May 2017

Alber Gonsalves is an Indian professional footballer.

== Career ==
After scoring five goals in nine matches for SESA Football Academy in the Goa Professional League, Gonsalves was signed by I-League side Sporting Clube de Goa on 18 March 2015. He made his debut for the club on 31 March 2015 against Bengaluru FC. He started the match and 55 minutes as Sporting Goa were defeated 4–1. Gonsalves then scored his first professional goal for the club on 22 April 2015 against Mumbai. His 13th-minute goal was the first of the match as it ended 1–1.

== International ==
Gonsalves was a part of the India team that took part in the 2014 Expo Unity World Cup.

== Career statistics ==
As of 30 May 2015

Club	Season	League			Federation Cup		Durand Cup		AFC		Total	
Club	Season	Division	Apps	Goals	Apps	Goals	Apps	Goals	Apps	Goals	Apps	Goals
Sporting Goa	2014–15	I-League	8	1	0	0	0	0	—	—	8	1
Fateh Hyderabad	2016–17	I-League 2nd Division		1	0	0	0	0	—	—		1
Career total			8	2	0	0	0	0	0	0	8	2

== Honour ==
India U20 (Goa India)

- Lusofonia Games Gold medal: 2014
