= Suranjit Singh Telem =

Indian footballer (born 1999)

Suranjit Singh
Personal information
- Full name: Suranjit Singh Telem
- Date of birth: 1 May 1999 (age 27)
- Place of birth: Manipur, India
- Position: Central midfielder

Team information
- Current team: TRAU
- Number: 71

Youth career
- East Bengal

Senior career*
Years	Team	Apps	(Gls)
2019–2020	Indian Arrows	11	(1)
2020–2023	RoundGlass Punjab	18	(0)
2023–	TRAU	1	(0)
- * Club domestic league appearances and goals as of 12:37, 7 February 2023 (UTC)

Suranjit Singh Telem (Meitei: Telem Suranjit Singh, born 1 May 1999) is an Indian professional footballer who plays as a midfielder for I-League club TRAU.

== Early life ==
Singh was born on 1 May 1999 in Manipur, India.

== Career ==
=== Indian Arrows ===
Singh signed his first senior contract for Indian Arrows for the 2019–20 I-League season. Singh made his debut on 28 December 2019 against Churchill Brothers as a substitute for Manvir Singh in the 76th minute. He scored his debut goal for the club in his debut game in the 90th minute of the match when the score was levelled 1–1. The match ended 1–2 in favour of Indian Arrows by the last minute goal of Singh. Singh was used as a substitute for 7 consecutive matches until he made his first breakthrough to the starting line-up in the match against NEROCA on 11 February 2020 which ended in a goalless draw. Singh played 11 matches and scored 1 goal during his time at Indian Arrows.

=== RoundGlass Punjab ===
For the 2020–21 season of I-League, Singh joined the Mohali-based club RoundGlass Punjab. Singh played his debut match for RoundGlass Punjab against Aizawl on 9 January 2021 as a substitute for Joseba Beitia in the 90th minute. The match ended 1–0 to Punjab. He started for the first time in the season in the next match against Churchill Brothers on 19 January which ended in a 0–1 defeat for Punjab. Singh played his last match of the season on 8 March against TRAU. The match ended in a 1–0 defeat for Punjab.

== Career statistics ==
=== Club ===
As of 13 May 2022

Club	Season	League			Cup		AFC		Total	
Club	Season	Division	Apps	Goals	Apps	Goals	Apps	Goals	Apps	Goals
Indian Arrows	2019–20	I-League	11	1	0	0	–		11	1
RoundGlass Punjab	2020–21	I-League	12	0	0	0	–		12	0
RoundGlass Punjab	2021–22	I-League	6	0	0	0	–		6	0
Career total			29	1	0	0	0	0	29	1

== Honours ==
East Bengal

- IFA Shield: 2018
