= Indian Arrows =

Association football club in India

- Full name: Indian Arrows football team
- Founded: M: 2010; 16 years ago (as AIFF XI); W: 2021; 5 years ago
- Dissolved: M: 2022; 4 years ago
- Ground: Kalinga Stadium
- Capacity: 15,000
- Owner: All India Football Federation
- League: I-League (M); IWL 2 (W)
- 2021–22 (M) 2025–26 (W): I-League, 10th of 13 (M); IWL 2, 2nd of 15 (W)
Home colours	Away colours

Departments of Indian Arrows
- Football (Men's): Football (Women's)

Indian Arrows (formerly known as Pailan Arrows) is an Indian developmental football team that competes in the Indian national football tiers. They competed in the I-League. The club was formed by the All India Football Federation in 2010, with a main goal of nurturing young Indian football talents.

After disbanding in 2013, the project was revived as Indian Arrows in 2017. In September 2022, the technical committee of the All India Football Federation decided to discontinue the participation of the Indian Arrows in the I-League because of the difficulty in fulfilling the AFC licensing criteria. Instead, it was decided to invest the funding in youth competitions such as Reliance Foundation Development League.

== History ==
=== AIFF XI (2010–2011) ===
The AIFF XI was formed under the recommendation of then India head coach Bob Houghton and All India Football Federation president Praful Patel after Bob noticed that almost all the India U19 and India U23 players were on the bench during the I-League season and were never getting any game time. The club was originally slated to join the I-League 2nd Division but after the disbanding of Mahindra United the AIFF allowed AIFF XI into the I-League automatically. The club participated in their first competition in 2010 which was the Federation Cup and played their first ever professional match on 21 September against JCT FC, in which AIFF XI won 1–0 with Malsawmfela scoring the first goal in the team's history. The team finished third in the group in the end, missing out on going to the next round by four points. The club then participated in their first I-League match on 3 December 2010 against Chirag United in which the club lost 1–2 and with Lalrindika Ralte scoring the first goal for the club in the league. The club then earned their first points on 8 December 2010 against ONGC after drawing 1–1. On 11 January 2011 it was announced that AIFF XI would change their name to Indian Arrows which would take effect on 1 February 2011. Arrows finished the 2010–11 I-League season in 9th place.

=== 2011–12 season ===
In the summer of 2011 they changed the name to Pailan Arrows, after the All India Football Federation reached an agreement with Pailan Group to sponsor the team. With the deal, Pailan Arrows were relocated to Kolkata and the Salt Lake Stadium. On 13 August, head coach Desmond Bulpin was sacked due to his "style of football", while Sukhwinder Singh was signed to take over. They also lost many of the stars of the previous season, Lalrindika Ralte, Jeje Lalpekhlua, Manandeep Singh and Gurpreet Singh Sandhu. They again participated in the 2011 Indian Federation Cup, winning two matches and losing one, ending knocked out in the group stage. Pailan Arrows then began the next campaign against Mohun Bagan at the Salt Lake Stadium on 23 October 2011. They lost 1–3 after Lalrozama Fanai gave them the early lead. On 7 February 2012 Sukhwinder Singh resigned as coach of Pailan Arrows for personal reasons. Pailan had not won a single match in the I-League and had only managed eight draws in 17 matches. Assistant coach Sujit Chakravarty took over the team for the remainder of the season. Towards the end of the season Pailan managed to win two matches, one against Chirag United Kerala and another against HAL to finish the season in 13th place.

=== 2012–13 season ===
The All India Football Federation signed Australian Arthur Papas as the new head coach of the India U23 and Pailan Arrows on 24 May 2012. Papas came after coaching his former club Oakleigh Cannons to the 2011 Victorian Premier League runners-up title.

=== Disbanding ===
On 29 August 2013, it was announced that Pailan Arrows had been disbanded by the All India Football Federation as Pailan Group could not financially support the team.

=== Revival as Indian Arrows (2017–2022) ===
After successful hosting of 2017 FIFA U-17 World Cup, AIFF revived the project as Indian Arrows with the aim of giving regular game time to U–17 world cup players as a team, and fielded the team in 2017–18 I-League. They were immune from relegation. Despite being praised for their competitive showings in 2017–18 I-League season, they finished bottom of the league with 15 points from 18 games. In the 2018–19 I League, with six wins and three drews, the Arrows finished eighth in the table among 11 teams. They qualified for the 2019 Super Cup by defeating Kerala Blasters 2–0. Due to the Coronavirus pandemic, the 2019–20 season was cancelled after 16 matches and the Arrows were placed at the bottom. In the 2021–21 I League season, they were placed tenth in the league.

==== Disbanding ====
In September 2022, the AIFF executive committee accepted the recommendation of its new technical committee, to discontinue Indian Arrows because of the difficulty in fulfilling the AFC Licensing criteria. They also announced that the finances used for the Indian Arrows will be invested in creating a new Elite Youth League in the country.

=== Women ===
The Indian Arrows Women participated in the 2021–22 Indian Women's League, where they finished fifth. In February 2025, AIFF announced the Indian Arrows Women Juniors for the 2024–25 IWL 2.

== Crest and colours ==
The club's colours were blue and white, just like the India national team. During the first season Pailan Arrows started with a dark blue kit but eventually during the 2010–11 season the club started using a normal blue kit with black shorts. For the 2011–12 season Pailan used a dark blue jersey and a white kit with black or red socks.

== Kit manufacturers and shirt sponsors ==
Period	Kit manufacturer	Shirt sponsor
2010—2011	Nike	None
2011—2013	Nike	POTO Potato Flakes
2017—2018	Nike	None
2018—2022	Six5Six	Hero

In October 2018, Government of Odisha signed Rs.50 million sponsorship deal with AIFF for the Arrows. The sponsorship deal will also cover India's under-15 football team. As part of the deal, the state government will host the Arrows and under-15 national team at the Kalinga Stadium in Bhubaneswar. The deal also covers the two teams’ stay in Bhubaneswar, providing them with the ground facility as well as boarding/lodging during the I-league and off-season.

== Stadium ==
For the 2010–11 I-League season the club played at the Tau Devi Lal Stadium in Gurgaon, Haryana when they were originally due to play at the Ambedkar Stadium in Delhi but due to the pitch condition the club was moved to Gurgaon. After relocating to Kolkata the club started to play at the Salt Lake Stadium which is also home to East Bengal, Mohun Bagan and Prayag United. In 2017–18, the team played in Goa and Delhi. In 2018–19, they used the Barabati Stadium and Kalinga Stadium. Kalinga Stadium in Bhubaneswar, Odisha were the last home base of the Indian Arrows before getting disbanded in September 2022.

== Notable former players ==
For all former or notable Indian Arrows players with a Wikipedia article, see: Indian Arrows players.

== Final staff ==
Position	Name
Head coach	(India) Shanmugam Venkatesh
Team manager	(India) Shalak Patade
Assistant coach	(India) Mahesh Gawli
Goalkeeping coach	(India) Abhijeet Mondal
Team analyst	(India) Prashanth Murthy
Physiotherapist	(India) Neeraj Churi

== Team records ==
=== Overview ===
Season	Division	Teams	Position	Attendance	Super Cup	Durand Cup	IFA Shield
2010–11	I-League	14	8	—	Group stage	DNP	DNP
2011–12	I-League	14	13	—	Group stage	DNP	DNP
2012–13	I-League	14	12	—	Group stage	Group stage	DNP
2017–18	I-League	10	10	—	Qualification round	DNP	DNP
2018–19	I-League	11	8	—	Round of 16	DNP	DNP
2019–20	I-League	11	11	—	DNP	DNP	DNP
2020–21	I-League	11	11	—	DNP	DNP	Group stage
2021–22	I-League	13	10	—	DNP	DNP	Group stage

=== Overall records ===
Season	Division							Top scorer	
Season	Division	P	W	D	L	GF	GA	Player	Goals
2010–11	I-League	26	7	8	11	31	49	(India) Jeje Lalpekhlua	13
2011–12	I-League	26	2	10	14	17	40	(India) Chinadorai Sabeeth	9
2012–13	I-League	26	6	5	15	45	40	(India) Halicharan Narzary (India) Milan Singh	5
2017–18	I-League	18	4	3	11	13	24	(India) Abhijit Sarkar	4
2018–19	I-League	20	6	3	11	19	28	(India) Rohit Danu	4
2019–20	I-League	16	2	3	11	7	20	(India) Vikram Pratap Singh	4
2020–21	I-League	10	1	1	8	6	31	(India) Harsh Patre	3
2021–22	I-League	12	2	3	7	6	20	(India) Parthib Gogoi	1

== Head coaching history ==
This is a full list of Indian Arrows's coaches and their records, from 2010 until they were disbanded in 2022.

Only competitive matches are counted. Wins, losses and draws are results at the final whistle; the results of penalty shoot-outs are not counted.

Name	Nationality	From	To	P	W	D	L	GF	GA	Win%
Des Bulpin	Scotland	August 2010	August 2011	26	7	8	11	31	49	26.92
Sukhwinder Singh	India	15 August 2011	7 February 2012	17	0	8	9	8	28	0.00
Sujit Chakravarty	India	8 February 2012	7 May 2012	9	2	2	5	9	12	22.22
Arthur Papas	Australia	22 May 2012	28 May 2013	27	6	6	15	27	47	22.22
Sanjoy Sen	India	20 July 2013	29 August 2013	0	0	0	0	0	0	—
Luís Norton de Matos	Portugal	17 August 2017	18 July 2018	19	4	3	12	14	26	21.05
Floyd Pinto	India	25 July 2018	29 November 2019	22	7	3	12	21	31	31.82
Shanmugam Venkatesh	India	29 November 2019	April 2022	31	5	5	21	18	58	16.13

== Women team records ==
=== Coaching staff ===
The coaching staff of the Indian Arrows Women Juniors for the 2024–25 Indian Women's League 2.

Position	Name
Head coach	(Sweden) Joakim Alexandersson
Assistant coach	(India) Nivetha Ramadoss
Goalkeeping coach	(India) Hameed KK

=== Overall records ===
Season	Division							Continental						Top scorer	
Season	Division	P	W	D	L	GF	GA	P	W	D	L	GF	GA	Player	Goals
2021–22	Indian Women's League	11	6	1	4	25	9	Not qualified						(India) Apurna Narzary (India) Priyangka Devi Naorem	9
2024–25	Indian Women's League 2	8	6	0	2	22	4	Second division						(India) Anushka Kumari	6

== See also ==
- AIFF Elite Academy
- Elite League
- Football in India
- History of Indian football
- Indian football league system
- Junior National Football Championship
- List of Indian Arrows seasons
- Subroto Cup
- India under-20 football team
