= 2014 Durand Cup quarter-finals =

This article details the 2014 Durand Cup quarter-finals.

The group stage features 12 teams: the 9 automatic qualifiers and the 3 winners of the preliminary stage.

The teams are drawn into four groups of three, and play each once. The match days are between 29 October to 4 November.

The group winner will advance to the Semi-finals.

== Group A ==
Team	Pld	W	D	L	GF	GA	GD	Pts
Salgaocar	2	1	1	0	5	2	+3	4
Indian Navy FC	2	1	0	1	4	6	−2	3
Laxmi Prasad	2	0	1	1	3	4	−1	1

30 October 2014
15:00 IST

Salgaocar	4 – 1	Indian Navy FC
Pierre 16', 47'; A. Oliveira 18'; G. Oliveira 90+2'	Report	Ramanlal 70'

Raia Sports Complex, Raia
Referee: Tapan Ghosh

1 November 2014
9:00 IST

Laxmi Prasad	2 – 3	Indian Navy FC
Opara 43', 50'	Report	Britto PM 45'; V Lalchhuanmawia 46'; Riyadh

Raia Sports Complex, Raia

3 November 2014
9:00 IST

Salgaocar	1 – 1	Laxmi Prasad
Pierre 44'	Report	Opara 28'

Raia Sports Complex, Raia
Referee: Parmanand Mandrekar

== Group B ==
Team	Pld	W	D	L	GF	GA	GD	Pts
Sporting Goa	2	2	0	0	7	3	+4	6
United	2	1	0	1	4	4	0	3
Air India	2	0	0	2	2	6	−4	0

29 October 2014
15:30 IST

Sporting Goa	3 – 2	United
Karpeh 5', 17'; Wolfe 65' (pen.)	Report	Oraon 42'; Sujay Oraon 70'

Raia Sports Complex, Raia
Referee: Maria Joseph

31 October 2014
15:45 IST

Air India	1 – 2	United
Siddharth Nayak 9'	Report	Babun Das 12' (pen.); Sujay Oraon 44'

Raia Sports Complex, Raia
Referee: B Nagoorkani

2 November 2014
15:45 IST

Sporting Goa	4 – 1	Air India
Karpeh 15' (pen.); C. Fernandes 28'; Clemente 45+1'; Wolfe 64'	Report	Neil Gaikwad 70'

Raia Sports Complex, Raia
Referee: Rahul Gupta

== Group C ==
Team	Pld	W	D	L	GF	GA	GD	Pts
Bengaluru	2	1	1	0	4	3	+1	4
SESA	2	1	1	0	3	2	+1	4
Mohammedan	2	0	0	2	1	3	−2	0

30 October 2014
9:00 IST

Bengaluru	2 – 1	Mohammedan
Chhetri 6'; Lyngdoh 38'	Report	Jaryan 68'

Raia Sports Complex, Raia
Referee: Dhanraj More

1 November 2014
15:45 IST

Mohammedan	0 – 1	SESA
	\	Jaison Vaz 48'

Raia Sports Complex, Raia

3 November 2014
15:45 IST

Bengaluru	2 – 2	SESA
Chhetri 66' (pen.), 90+4' (pen.)	Report	Colaco 79'; Melwyn Fernandes 90+2'

Raia Sports Complex, Raia
Referee: Fasil Salahudeen

== Group D ==
Team	Pld	W	D	L	GF	GA	GD	Pts
Pune	2	2	0	0	4	0	+4	6
Vasco	2	0	1	1	1	2	−1	1
Churchill Brothers	2	0	1	1	1	4	−3	1

31 October 2014
9:00 IST

Pune	3 – 0	Churchill Brothers
Ganesh 7'; Izumi 51'; Haokip 65'	Report

Raia Sports Complex, Raia
Referee: Rahul Gupta

2 November 2014
9:00 IST

Churchill Brothers	1 – 1	Vasco
Pankaj Sona 66'		Emmanu Elchinedu 54' (pen.)

Raia Sports Complex, Raia
Referee: Maria Joseph

4 November 2014
15:45 IST

Pune	1 – 0	Vasco
Balan 30'	Report

Raia Sports Complex, Raia
