= 2014–15 Goa Professional League =

Goa Professional League
- Season: 2014–15
- Champions: Salgaocar F.C. 7th GPL title 21st Goan title
- Relegated: Goa Velha
- Matches played: 65
- Goals scored: 173 (2.66 per match)
- Top goalscorer: Victorino Fernandes (11 goals)
- Biggest home win: Sporting Clube de Goa 8- 0 Goa Velha
- Biggest away win: Santa Cruz 0-8 Salgaocar F.C.
- Highest scoring: Sporting Clube de Goa 8-0 Goa Velha, Santa Cruz 0-8 Salgaocar F.C. (8 Goals)
- Longest winning run: Salgaocar F.C. (6 matches)
- Longest unbeaten run: Salgaocar F.C. (12 matches)
- Longest losing run: Goa Velha ( 4 Matches )

The 2014–15 Goa Professional League (also known as the Airtel Goa Pro League for sponsorship reasons) was the 17th season of top-tier football in the Indian state of Goa. It began on 24 August 2014. Sporting Goa were the defending champions.

== Teams ==
| Team | City/Town |
|---|---|
| Calangute Association | Calangute |
| Churchill Brothers | Salcete |
| Dempo | Panaji |
| Goa Velha | Old Goa |
| Laxmi Prasad | Mapusa |
| Salgaocar | Vasco da Gama |
| Santa Cruz Club of Cavelossim | Cavelossim |
| SESA Football Academy | Sanquelim |
| Sporting Clube de Goa | Panaji |
| Vasco S.C. | Vasco |

== Table ==
| Pos | Team | Pld | W | D | L | GF | GA | GD | Pts | Qualification or relegation |
|---|---|---|---|---|---|---|---|---|---|---|
| 1 | Salgaocar | 13 | 10 | 3 | 0 | 32 | 9 | +23 | 33 | Champions |
| 2 | Laxmi Prasad | 13 | 7 | 3 | 3 | 20 | 10 | +10 | 24 | |
| 3 | SESA FA | 13 | 7 | 2 | 4 | 16 | 13 | +3 | 23 | |
| 4 | Churchill Brothers | 13 | 6 | 2 | 5 | 21 | 19 | +2 | 20 | |
| 5 | Santa Cruz | 13 | 5 | 3 | 5 | 13 | 23 | −10 | 18 | |
| 6 | Sporting Goa | 13 | 5 | 3 | 5 | 25 | 12 | +13 | 18 | |
| 7 | Dempo | 13 | 5 | 2 | 6 | 19 | 18 | +1 | 17 | |
| 8 | Vasco | 13 | 4 | 3 | 6 | 12 | 17 | −5 | 15 | |
| 9 | Calangute Association | 13 | 2 | 2 | 9 | 11 | 26 | −15 | 8 | |
| 10 | Goa Velha (R) | 13 | 0 | 5 | 8 | 4 | 26 | −22 | 5 | Relegation to 2015 Goa 1st Division |

Updated to match(es) played on 10 December 2014. Source: Goa Football Association
Rules for classification: 1) points; 2) goal difference; 3) number of goals scored.
(R) Relegated

== Fixtures and Results ==
=== Round 1 ===
| 24 August 2014 | Dempo | 1 — 0 | Vasco | Duler Stadium, Mapusa |
| 16:00 IST | Amiri 34' | Report |

| 25 August 2014 | Laxmi Prasad | 0 — 0 | Goa Velha | Duler Stadium, Mapusa |
| 16:00 IST | | Report |

| 26 August 2014 | Sporting Goa | 1 — 1 | Salgaocar | Duler Stadium, Mapusa |
| 16:00 IST | V. Fernandes 68' | Report | Pierre 43' |

| 27 August 2014 | SESA | 1 — 2 | Santa Cruz | Duler Stadium, Mapusa |
| 16:00 IST | Gonsalves 50' | Report | Mendes 77'; Mascarenhas 79' |

| 28 August 2014 | Churchill Brothers | 1 — 1 | Calangute Association | Duler Stadium, Mapusa |
| 16:00 IST | Costa 90+4' | Report | Sequeira 1' |

=== Round 2 ===
| 31 August 2014 | Sporting Goa | 1 — 1 | Dempo | Duler Stadium, Mapusa |
| 16:00 IST | V. Fernandes 86' | Report | Ferrao 17' |

| 1 September 2014 | Goa Velha | 0 — 2 | Churchill Brothers | Duler Stadium, Mapusa |
| 16:00 IST | | Report | Sona 45+1'; Rebello 80' |

| 3 September 2014 | Salgaocar | 1 — 0 | Laxmi Prasad | Duler Stadium, Mapusa |
| 16:00 IST | T. Singh 13' | Report |

| 4 September 2014 | Vasco | 1 — 1 | SESA F.A. | Duler Stadium, Mapusa |
| 16:00 IST | Oliveira 17' | Report | Gonsalves 18' |

| 5 September 2014 | Calangute Association | 0 — 1 | Santa Cruz | Duler Stadium, Mapusa |
| 16:00 IST | | Report | J. Fernandes 11' |

=== Round 3 ===
| 6 September 2014 | Laxmi Prasad | 1 — 0 | Dempo | Duler Stadium, Mapusa |
| 16:00 IST | Masceranhas 50' | Report |

| 7 September 2014 | Goa Velha | 1 — 2 | Salgaocar | Duler Stadium, Mapusa |
| 16:00 IST | O. Oliveira 38' | Report | G. Oliveira 23'; Pierre 48' |

| 8 September 2014 | Calangute Association | 1 — 2 | Vasco | Duler Stadium, Mapusa |
| 16:00 IST | F. Fernandes 3' (o.g.) | Report | A. Dias 29'; J. Oliveira 83' |

| 9 September 2014 | Churchill Brothers | 2 — 1 | Santa Cruz | Duler Stadium, Mapusa |
| 16:00 IST | P. Sona 45+2'; Okolie 71' | Report | J. Fernandes 9' |

| 10 September 2014 | SESA | 1 — 0 | Sporting Goa | Duler Stadium, Mapusa |
| 16:00 IST | P. Rebello 78' | Report |

=== Round 4 ===
| 11 September 2014 | Dempo | 4-0 | Goa Velha | Duler Stadium, Mapusa |
| 16:00 IST | Ozbey 20'; M. Fernandes 56'; Narzary 77', 83' | Report |

| 12 September 2014 | Vasco | 0-1 | Santa Cruz | Duler Stadium, Mapusa |
| 16:00 IST | | Report | E. Mendes 69' |

| 14 October 2014 | Salgaocar | 1-0 | Churchill Brothers | Duler Stadium, Mapusa |
| 16:00 IST | Jairu 70' | Report |

| 14 September 2014 | Sporting Goa | 3-0 | Calangute Association | Duler Stadium, Mapusa |
| 16:00 IST | V. Fernandes 5', 12', 32' | Report |

| 15 September 2014 | SESA | 0-3 | Laxmi Prasad | Duler Stadium, Mapusa |
| 16:00 IST | | Report | P. Naik 57'; Peixote 75'; A. Miranda 83' |

=== Round 5 ===
| 16 September 2014 | Churchill Brothers | 1-2 | Vasco | Duler Stadium, Mapusa |
| 16:00 IST | Okolie 47' | Report | J. Dias 12'; J. Oliveira 30' |

| 17 September 2014 | Salgaocar | 3-0 | Dempo | Duler Stadium, Mapusa |
| 16:00 IST | M. Borges 35', 46'; Jairu 74' | Report |

| 18 September 2014 | Santa Cruz | 3-2 | Sporting Goa | Duler Stadium, Mapusa |
| 16:00 IST | J. Fernandes 28', 55'; Niasso 90' | Report | D'Mello 7'; V. Fernandes 17' |

| 19 September 2014 | Calangute Association | 0-2 | Laxmi Prasad | Duler Stadium, Mapusa |
| 16:00 IST | | Report | A. Miranda 4'; P. Colaco 90+1' |

| 20 September 2014 | Goa Velha | 0-0 | SESA | Duler Stadium, Mapusa |
| 16:00 IST | | Report |

=== Round 6 ===
| 21 September 2014 | Sporting Goa | 2-0 | Vasco | Duler Stadium, Mapusa |
| 16:00 IST | Rao 11'; Karpeh 79' | Report |

| 22 September 2014 | Laxmi Prasad | 3-0 | Santa Cruz | Duler Stadium, Mapusa |
| 16:00 IST | Peixote 71'; Opara 84'; Masceranhas 90+1' | Report |

| 23 September 2014 | Dempo | 4-2 | Churchill Brothers | Duler Stadium, Mapusa |
| 16:00 IST | Rai 63'; Ozbey 78', 85'; Ferrao 79' | Report | Gawli 67' (o.g.); M. Singh 77' |

| 24 September 2014 | Calangute Association | 1-0 | Goa Velha | Duler Stadium, Mapusa |
| 16:00 IST | Felix 4' | Report |

| 25 September 2014 | SESA | 1-2 | Salgaocar | Duler Stadium, Mapusa |
| 16:00 IST | P. Rebello 31' | Report | M. Borges 48'; T. Singh 87' |

=== Round 7 ===
| 26 September 2014 | Dempo | 0-0 | Santa Cruz | Duler Stadium, Mapusa |
| 16:00 IST | | Report |

| 27 September 2014 | Sporting Goa | 8-0 | Goa Velha | Duler Stadium, Mapusa |
| 16:00 IST | R. Borges 20', 44'; V. Fernandes 30', 33', 61', 89'; M. Borges 72'; Karpeh 78' | Report |

| 28 September 2014 | Churchill Brothers | 2-1 | Laxmi Prasad | Duler Stadium, Mapusa |
| 16:00 IST | Balmuchu 47'; M. Singh | Report | Opara |

| 29 September 2014 | Vasco | 0-4 | Salgaocar | Duler Stadium, Mapusa |
| 16:00 IST | | Report | Pierre 1'; Oliveira 45+1'; Duffy 80', 89' |

| 30 September 2014 | SESA | 2-1 | Calangute Association | Duler Stadium, Mapusa |
| 16:00 IST | A. Gonsalves 30', 45+1' | Report | L. Martins 85' |

=== Round 8 ===
| 1 October 2014 | Laxmi Prasad | 2-0 | Sporting Goa | Duler Stadium, Mapusa |
| 16:00 IST | A. Miranda 44'; Opara 76' | Report |

| 2 October 2014 | Goa Velha | 2-2 | Vasco | Duler Stadium, Mapusa |
| 16:00 IST | T. Dias 5', 90+1' | Report | J. Oliveira 44'; J. Colaco 63' |

| 3 October 2014 | Santa Cruz | 1-1 | Salgaocar | Duler Stadium, Mapusa |
| 16:00 IST | E. Mendes 13' | Report | Dias 3' |

| 4 October 2014 | Calangute Association | 2-4 | Dempo | Duler Stadium, Mapusa |
| 16:00 IST | Menezes 41'; Felix 80' | Report | M. Fernandes 50'; Ferrao 57', 85'; V. Rai 71' |

| 5 October 2014 | SESA | 2-3 | Churchill Brothers | Duler Stadium, Mapusa |
| 16:00 IST | A. Gonsalves 45+1'; C. Viegas | Report | Okolie 15', 52'; Nwadialu 44' |

=== Round 9 ===
| 6 October 2014 | Vasco | 0-0 | Laxmi Prasad | Duler Stadium, Mapusa |
| 16:00 IST | | Report |

| 7 October 2014 | Calangute Association | 2-3 | Salgaocar | Duler Stadium, Mapusa |
| 16:00 IST | Nagle 15'; Felix 51' | Report | A. Fernandes 10'; T. Singh 18'; Jairu 77' |

| 22 October 2014 | Dempo | 1-2 | SESA | Duler Stadium, Mapusa |
| 16:00 IST | U. Rai 79' | Report | P. Rebello 30'; A. Gonsalves 77' |

| 29 October 2014 | Santa Cruz | 0-0 | Goa Velha | Duler Stadium, Mapusa |
| 16:00 IST | | Report |

| 16 November 2014 | Churchill Brothers | 0-0 | Sporting Goa | Duler Stadium, Mapusa |
| 16:00 | | Report |

== Championship League Fixtures ==
| 20 November 2014 | Churchill Brothers | 3 – 1 | Laxmi Prasad | Cuncolim Ground, Cuncolim |
| 16:00 | N. Fernandes; Okolie 70', 90+2' | | Wali 59' |

| 21 November 2014 | Dempo | 0 – 1 | Santa Cruz | Cuncolim Ground, Cuncolim |
| 16:00 | | | S. Fernandes 70' |

| 24 November 2014 | Dempo | 1 – 2 | Salgaocar | Cuncolim Ground, Cuncolim |
| 16:00 | U. Rai 6' | | Duffy 57'; T. Singh 90+2' |

| 25 November 2014 | Santa Cruz | 1 – 3 | Churchill Brothers | Cuncolim Ground, Cuncolim |
| 16:00 | Niasso | | Okolie; N. Fernandes |

| 28 November 2014 | Laxmi Prasad | 2 – 0 | Dempo | Duler Stadium, Mapusa |
| 16:00 | Opara 15' (pen.); S. Kundaikar 60' |

| 28 November 2014 | Santa Cruz | 0 – 8 | Salgaocar | SAG Ground, Benaulim |
| 16:00 | Pierre 3'; J. Barbosa 4'; Duffy 11', 53'; D. Fernandes 63', 72', 76'; Jairu 83' |

| 1 December 2014 | Churchill Brothers | 0 – 2 | Salgaocar | SAG Ground, Benaulim |
| 16:00 | | | U. Harijan 37', 90+7' |

| 1 December 2014 | Santa Cruz | 2 – 3 | Laxmi Prasad | Cuncolim Ground, Cuncolim |
| 16:00 | M. Fernandes 33'; A. Fernandes 35' | | Opara 55', 56'; Peixote 57' |

| 4 December 2014 | Salgaocar | 2 – 2 | Laxmi Prasad | Cuncolim Ground, Cuncolim |
| 16:00 | D. Fernandes 57'; Pierre 88' | | Wali 31'; Masceranhas 75' |

| 4 December 2014 | Churchill Brothers | 2 – 3 | Dempo | SAG Ground, Benaulim |
| 16:00 | Nwadialu 4', 66' | | Ferrao 11'; Sawant 38', 73' |

== Relegation League Fixtures ==
| 18 November 2014 | Vasco | 3 – 1 | Sporting Goa | Duler Stadium, Mapusa |
| 16:00 | N. Mendes 33'; Chinedu 60', 90+2' | | Karpeh |

| 19 November 2014 | Calangute Association | 1 – 1 | Goa Velha | Cuncolim Ground, Cuncolim |
| 16:00 | E. Fernandes 11' (o.g.) | | J. Dias 90+1' (o.g.) |

| 22 November 2014 | Sporting Goa | 0 – 3 | Calangute Association | Duler Stadium, Mapusa |
| 16:00 | Karpeh 13', 90' (pen.); M. Borges 44' |

| 23 November 2014 | SESA | 1 – 0 | Vasco | Cuncolim Ground, Cuncolim |
| 16:00 | Y. Kadam 34' |

| 29 November 2014 | Vasco | 1 – 2 | Calangute Association | Duler Stadium, Mapusa |
| 16:00 | Chinedu 24' | | Felix 86'; S. Coutinho 90+1' |

| 29 November 2014 | SESA | 1 – 0 | Goa Velha | Cuncolim Ground, Cuncolim |
| 16:00 | M. Fernandes 67' |

| 2 December 2014 | Goa Velha | 0 – 4 | Sporting Goa | Cuncolim Ground, Cuncolim |
| 16:00 | | | Wolfe 61'; V. Fernandes 66'; Passi 75', 80' |

| 5 December 2014 | Goa Velha | 0 – 1 | Vasco |
| 16:00 |

| 5 December 2014 | Calangute Association | 0 – 3 | SESA |
| 16:00 |

| 10 December 2014 | Sporting Goa | 0 – 1 | SESA | Duler Stadium |
| 16:00 | | | M. Fernandes 55' |

== Top scorers ==
| Rank | Player | Team | Goals |
|---|---|---|---|
| 1 | (India) Victorino Fernandes | Sporting Goa | 11 |
| 2 | (Nigeria) Odafe Onyeka Okolie | Churchill Brothers | 7 |
| 3 | (India) Alber Gonsalves | SESA | 6 |
| 4 | (India) Joy Ferrao | Dempo | 5 |
| 4 | (Scotland) Darryl Duffy | Salgaocar | 5 |
| 4 | (Ivory Coast) Douhou Pierre | Salgaocar | 5 |
| 4 | (Australia) Boima Karpeh | Sporting Goa | 5 |
| 5 | (India) Jerose Oliveira | Vasco | 4 |
| 5 | (India) Thangjam Singh | Salgaocar | 4 |
| 5 | (Nigeria) David Opara | Laxmi Prasad | 4 |
| 5 | (India) Dawson Fernandes | Salgaocar | 4 |
| 5 | (Nigeria) Felix Chidi Odili | Calangute Association | 4 |
