= 2014 Durand Cup =

127th edition of the Durand Cup

Tournament details
- Country: India
- Teams: 12

Final positions
- Champions: Salgaocar (3rd title)
- Runners-up: Pune

Tournament statistics
- Matches played: 15
- Goals scored: 43 (2.87 per match)
- Top goal scorer(s): Boima Karpeh (4 goals)

The 2014 Durand Cup was the 127th season of the Durand Cup, the third oldest enduring football tournament in the world, a knockout tournament contested in Goa, India, from 20 October to 8 November.

Mohammedan unsuccessfully defended its 2013 final title, losing in the quarterfinal of Group C to Bengaluru and SESA.

Salgaocar successfully pursued its 3rd successive 2014 title when it defeated Pune, 1–0 in the final.

== Teams ==
This edition of the Durand Cup saw 25 teams taking part in the tournament, 9 of which were directly seeded into Quarter Finals and remaining teams fighting it out in the Qualification Round for the 3 spots remaining.

Teams
Participating In quarter final	Participating In Qualification Round
Air India; Bengaluru FC; Churchill Brothers; Indian Navy; Mohammedan; Pune; Salgaocar; Sporting Goa; United	AIFF Academy; Army Green; Army Red; BEG Centre; Corps of Signals; Dalbir FA; Garhwal Rifles; Goa Velha; Indian Air Force; Laxmi Prasad; Oil India; SESA; Southern Samity; Santa Cruz SC; Vasco; Youngsters Club

== Preliminary round ==
Preliminary round was a knockout round and held between 20 October and 27 October. Vasco S.C., Laxmi Prasad S.C. and SESA F.A. qualified for the main draw.

=== Bracket ===
Round 1
Pool A
Army Green	2
Dalbir FA	1
Air Force	1
Laxmi Prasad	2
Pool C
BEG Centre	1
Army Red	7
SESA	w/o
Oil India
Pool B
Youngster Club	0
India U19	5
Corps of Signals	1
Goa Velha SC	2
Pool D
Garhwal Rifles	w/o
Southern Samity
Vasco	0(4)
Santa Cruz	0(3)

Round 2
Army Green	0
Laxmi Prasad	4
Army Red	1(3)
SESA	1(5)
India U19	3
Goa Velha SC	0
Garhwal Rifles	1
Vasco	3

Round 3
Laxmi Prasad	1
SESA	0
India U19	0
Vasco	2

Qualified
Laxmi Prasad
Vasco
Qualifier
India U19	1(3)
SESA	1(4)

=== Round 1 ===
20 October 2014	Youngster Club	0–5	India U19	3MTR Ground, Navelim
9:00 IST			R. Singh 39'; R. Oram 67'; Prashant 68'; M. Basumatry 70', 89'	Referee: Melwin D'Costa

20 October 2014	Corps of Signals	1–2	Goa Velha SC	Raia Panchayat Ground, Raia
15:00 IST	R. Singh 37'		J. Vaz 51'; S. Hadkonkar 71'	Attendance: 1800; Referee: Maria Rebello

21 October 2014	Garhwal Rifles	walkover	Southern Samity	Raia Panchayat Ground, Raia
9:00 IST

21 October 2014	Vasco	0–0 (4–3 p)	Santa Cruz	3MTR Ground, Navelim
15:00 IST

22 October 2014	Army Green FC	2–1	Dalbir FA	3MTR Ground, Navelim
9:00 IST	D. Singh 30'; A. Singh 50' (o.g.)		Vikash 53'	Attendance: 150; Referee: Parmanand Mandrekar

22 October 2014	BEG Centre	1–7	Army Red FC	3MTR Ground, Navelim
15:00 IST	V. Singh 77'		S. Rai 32'; D. Thapa 60', 90'; A. Tudu 71', 82', 88', 90+2'	Attendance: 200; Referee: Parmanand Mandrekar

22 October 2014	SESA	walkover	Oil India	Raia Panchayat Ground, Raia
9:00 IST

23 October 2014	Air Force FC	1–2	Laxmi Prasad	3MTR Ground, Navelim
15:00 IST	Vivek 50'		Opara 21', 65'	Referee: Rahul Gupta

=== Round 2 ===
24 October 2014	India U19	3–0	Goa Velha	3MTR Ground, Navelim
9:00 IST	Lalrampuia 53', 57', 59'

24 October 2014	Garhwal Rifles	1–3	Vasco	3MTR Ground, Navelim
15:00 IST	A. Roy 17'		A. Fernandes 9', 48'; J. Oliveira 15'

25 October 2014	Army Green FC	0–4	Laxmi Prasad	3MTR Ground, Navelim
9:00 IST			S. Fernandes 30'; Opara 54', 80'; Peixote 87'	Referee: Maria Rebello

25 October 2014	Army Red FC	1–1 (3–5 p)	SESA	Duler Stadium, Mapusa
15:00 IST	M. Dileep 43'		A. Gonsalves 16'	Referee: Melwin D'Costa

=== Round 3 ===
26 October 2014	India U19	0–2	Vasco	Duler Stadium, Mapusa
9:00 IST			J. Oliveira 3'; A. D'Souza 90+1'	Referee: Maria Rebello

26 October 2014	Laxmi Prasad	1–0	SESA	Duler Stadium, Mapusa
15:00 IST	S. Fernandes 36'			Referee: Maria Joseph

=== Qualifier ===
27 October 2014	India U19	1–1 (3–4 p)	SESA	Duler Stadium, Mapusa
15:00 IST	D. Lalrampuia 87'		J. Vaz 30'	Referee: PK Prajith
	Penalties
	(penalty missed) Lalrampuia; (penalty scored) H. Fernandes; (penalty scored) G. Singh; (penalty scored) N. Kumar; (penalty missed) Malsawnzuala		(penalty missed) A. Gonsalves; (penalty scored) P. Vaz; (penalty scored) Y. Kadam; (penalty scored) P. Korgaonkar; (penalty scored) A. Colaco

== Quarter-finals ==
The quarter-finals of the Durand Cup will be played between 12 teams.

=== Group A ===
Team	Pld	W	D	L	GF	GA	GD	Pts
Salgaocar	2	1	1	0	5	2	+3	4
Indian Navy FC	2	1	0	1	4	6	−2	3
Laxmi Prasad	2	0	1	1	3	4	−1	1

=== Group B ===
Team	Pld	W	D	L	GF	GA	GD	Pts
Sporting Goa	2	2	0	0	7	3	+4	6
United	2	1	0	1	4	4	0	3
Air India	2	0	0	2	2	6	−4	0

=== Group C ===
Team	Pld	W	D	L	GF	GA	GD	Pts
Bengaluru	2	1	1	0	4	3	+1	4
SESA	2	1	1	0	3	2	+1	4
Mohammedan	2	0	0	2	1	3	−2	0

=== Group D ===
Team	Pld	W	D	L	GF	GA	GD	Pts
Pune	2	2	0	0	4	0	+4	6
Vasco	2	0	1	1	1	2	−1	1
Churchill Brothers	2	0	1	1	1	4	−3	1

== Semi-finals ==
6 November 2014	Salgaocar	0–0 (5– 4 p)	Bengaluru	Raia Sports Complex, Raia
08:45 IST		Report		Referee: Maria Joseph
	Penalties
	(penalty scored) G. Oliveira; (penalty scored) Lamare; (penalty scored) Colaco; (penalty scored) Mundampara; (penalty scored) Duffy		(penalty scored) Walker; (penalty missed) Chhetri; (penalty scored) Udanta; (penalty scored) Lyngdoh; (penalty scored) Johnson

6 November 2014	Sporting Goa	1–2	Pune	Raia Sports Complex, Raia
15:00 IST	Karpeh 23'		Balan 19'; Sueoka 62'

== Final ==
8 November 2014	Salgaocar	1–0	Pune	Raia Sports Complex, Raia
14:30 IST	Thangjam	Source:

== Scorers ==
All goals from tournament proper. Goals from qualifiers are not counted in this list.

4 goals

- (Australia) Boima Karpeh (Sporting Goa)

3 goals

- (Nigeria) David Opara (Laxmi Prasad)
- (Ivory Coast) Douhou Pierre (Salgaocar)
- (India) Sunil Chhetri (Bengaluru)

2 goals

- (Trinidad and Tobago) Anthony Wolfe (Sporting Goa)
- (India) Bineesh Balan (Pune)
- (India) Sujay Oraon (United)

1 goal

- (Liberia) Alfred Jaryan (Mohammedan)
- (India) Angelo Colaco (SESA)
- (India) Arata Izumi (Pune)
- (India) Aslon Oliveira (Salgaocar)
- (India) Babun Das (United)
- (India) Britto PM (Indian Navy FC)
- (India) Cajetan Fernandes (Sporting Goa)
- (India) Dhanpal Ganesh (Pune)
- (Nigeria) Emmanu Elchinedu (Vasco)
- (India) Eugeneson Lyngdoh (Bengaluru)
- (India) Gilbert Oliveira (Salgaocar)
- (India) Jaison Vaz (SESA)
- (India) Joseph Clemente (Sporting Goa)
- (India) Melwyn Fernandes (SESA)
- Neil Gaikwad (Air India)
- (India) Pankaj Sona (Churchill Brothers)
- (India) Ramanlal (Indian Navy FC)
- (India) Riyadh B (Indian Navy FC)
- (Japan) Ryuji Sueoka (Pune)
- Siddharth Nayak (Air India)
- (India) Shankar Oraon (United)
- (India) Thangjam Singh (Salgaocar)
- (India) Thongkhosiem Haokip (Pune)
- (India) V Lalchhuanmawia (Indian Navy FC)
