= 2012–13 Goa Professional League =

Goa Professional League
- Season: 2012–13
- Champions: Salgaocar; 6th GPL title 20th Goan title
- Relegated: Vasco S.C.
- Top goalscorer: (Spain) Juanfri

The 2012–13 Goa Professional League (also known as the Kingfisher Goa Pro League for sponsorship reasons) was the 15th season of top-tier football in the Indian state of Goa. It began on 1 September 2012. Dempo were the defending champions.

== Teams ==
Team	City/Town
Churchill Brothers	Salcete
Dempo	Panaji
Goa Velha	Old Goa
Margao	Margao
Salgaocar	Vasco da Gama
Santa Cruz Club of Cavelossim	Cavelossim
SESA Football Academy	Sanquelim
Sporting Clube de Goa	Panaji
Vasco	Vasco da Gama
Wilred Leisure	Curtorim

== First Stage League table ==
Pos	Team	Pld	W	D	L	GF	GA	GD	Pts	Qualification or relegation
1	Salgaocar	9	7	1	1	25	10	+15	22	Champion
2	Dempo	9	7	0	2	14	9	+5	21	
3	SESA FA	9	6	2	1	17	5	+12	20	
4	Churchill Brothers	9	5	1	3	12	9	+3	16	
5	Sporting Club de Goa	9	3	3	3	15	10	+5	12	
6	Margao	9	3	2	4	5	7	−2	11	
7	Wilred Leisure	9	2	2	5	6	12	−6	8	
8	Vasco	9	1	4	4	14	16	−2	7	
9	Santa Cruz Club of Cavelossim	9	1	4	4	10	13	−3	7	
10	Goa Velha	9	0	1	8	3	30	−27	1	

== Championship League ==
=== Table ===
Pos	Team	Pld	W	D	L	GF	GA	GD	Pts	Qualification or relegation
1	Sporting Goa	4	3	1	0	13	5	+8	10	Champions
2	Salgaocar	4	2	1	1	6	7	−1	7	
3	Churchill Brothers	4	1	1	2	5	5	0	4	
4	SESA	4	1	1	2	8	10	−2	4	
5	Dempo	4	1	0	3	6	10	−4	3	

Updated to match(es) played on 26 May 2013. Source: Goa Football Association
Rules for classification: 1) points; 2) goal difference; 3) number of goals scored.

=== Fixtures and results ===
21 February 2013	Dempo	0 – 2	Churchill Brothers	Panchayat Ground, Raia
Thursday		Report	Chhetri 42', 56' (pen.)

21 February 2013	Salgaocar	1 – 1	SESA	Duler Stadium, Mapusa
Thursday	Josimar 90'	Report	Kadam 34'

24 February 2013	SESA	2 – 5	Dempo	Duler Stadium, Mapusa
Sunday	Vaz 66'; Chukwuma	Report	Ferrao 35', 53'; Fernandes; Gonsalves; Baretto (own)

25 February 2013	Sporting Goa	4 – 1	Salgaocar	Duler Stadium, Mapusa
Monday	Peixoto 18'; Juanfri (2); Nnanna	Report	Obatola 3'

9 April 2013	Salgaocar	2 – 1	Dempo	Duler Stadium, Mapusa
Tuesday	Mascarenhas 49'; Oliveira 73'	Report	Franco

25 April 2013	Sporting Goa	4 – 3	SESA	Duler Stadium, Mapusa
Thursday	Nnanna 68'; Juanfri 70'; Fernandes 80'; Shirodkar 90'	Report	Kadam 2'; Miranda 49', 65'

27 April 2013	Churchill Brothers	1 – 2	Salgaocar	Duler Stadium, Mapusa
Saturday	Costa 65'	Report	Obatola 34'; Fernandes 77'

28 April 2013	Dempo	0 – 4	Sporting Goa	Duler Stadium, Mapusa
Sunday		Report	Rodrigues; Fernandes; Fernandes; Borjes

6 May 2013	SESA	2 – 1	Churchill Brothers	Tilak Maidan Stadium, Vasco da Gama
Monday

14 May 2013	Churchill Brothers	1 – 1	Sporting Goa	Duler Stadium, Mapusa
Tuesday

=== Goalscorers ===
3 goals:

- (Spain) Juanfri (Sporting Goa)

2 goals:

- (India) Sunil Chhetri (Churchill Brothers)
- (India) Joy Ferrao (Dempo)
- (Nigeria) O. J. Obatola (Salgaocar)
- (India) Yogesh Kadam (SESA)
- (India) Charles Miranda (SESA)
- (Nigeria) Ogba Kalu Nnanna (Sporting Goa)
- (India) Dawson Fernandes (Sporting Goa)

1 goal:

- (India) Richard Costa (Churchill Brothers)
- (India) Romeo Fernandes (Dempo)
- (India) Cliffton Gonsalves (Dempo)
- (India) Godwin Franco (Dempo)
- (Brazil) Josimar da Silva Martins (Salgaocar)
- (India) Gilbert Oliveira (Salgaocar)
- (India) Marcus Mascarenhas (Salgaocar)
- (India) Augustin Fernandes (Salgaocar)
- (Nigeria) Chukwudi Chukwuma (SESA)
- (India) Ponif Vaz (SESA)
- (India) Pratesh Shirodkar (Sporting Goa)
- (India) Valerio Rodrigues (Sporting Goa)
- (India) Victorino Fernandes (Sporting Goa)
- (India) Rowllin Borjes (Sporting Goa)

== Relegation League ==
=== Table ===
Pos	Team	Pld	W	D	L	GF	GA	GD	Pts	Qualification or relegation
1	Santa Cruz Club of Cavelossim	4	4	0	0	8	2	+6	12	
2	Margao	4	2	1	1	4	2	+2	7	
3	Goa Velha	4	2	1	1	4	3	+1	7	
4	Wilred Leisure	4	1	0	3	2	6	−4	3	
5	Vasco	4	0	0	4	1	6	−5	0	Relegation

Updated to match(es) played on 10 March 2013. Source:

=== Fixtures and Results ===
11 February 2013	Margao	2 – 0	Vasco	Panchayat Ground, Raia
Monday	Costa 37'; Camara 51'	Report

12 February 2013	Wilred Leisure	1 – 3	Cavelossim	Duler Stadium, Mapusa
Tuesday	Monteiro	Report	Andro; D'Souza; Gomes

15 February 2013	Cavelossim	2 – 0	Margao	Panchayat Ground, Raia
Friday	D'Souza 38'; Samson 45'	Report

15 February 2013	Vasco	1 – 2	Goa Velha	Duler Stadium, Mapusa
Friday	Fernandes 18'	Report	Naik 32'; Gonsalves 40'

19 February 2013	Vasco	0 – 1	Wilred Leisure	Panchayat Ground, Raia
Tuesday		Report	Fernandes 89'

19 February 2013	Margao	0 – 0	Goa Velha	Duler Stadium, Mapusa
Tuesday		Report

22 February 2013	Goa Velha	1 – 0	Wilred Leisure	Panchayat Ground, Raia
Friday	Diukar 11'	Report

22 February 2013	Cavelossim	1 – 0	Vasco	Duler Stadium, Mapusa
Friday	Akpele 12'	Report

26 February 2013	Wilred Leisure	0 – 2	Margao	Duler Stadium, Mapusa
Tuesday		Report

26 February 2013	Goa Velha	2 – 1	Cavelossim	Panchayat Ground, Raia
Tuesday	Carvalho 14'; Fernandes 72'	Report	Dias 82'

=== Goalscorers ===
2 goals:

- (India) Angelo D'Souza (Cavelossim)

1 goal:

- (India) Gammy Costa (Margao)
- (India) Joel Camara (Margao)
- (India) Sectorio Monteiro (Wilred Leisure)
- (India) Aliston Fernandes (Wilred Leisure)
- (India) Fredrick Endro (Cavelossim)
- (India) Wilton Gomes (Cavelossim)
- (Nigeria) Julius Akpele (Cavelossim)
- (India) Joaquim Carvalho (Cavelossim)
- (India) Jolex Fernandes (Cavelossim)
- (India) Samson Fernandes (Cavelossim)
- (India) Elvino Fernandes (Vasco)
- (India) Chatur Naik (Goa Velha)
- (India) Nester Dias (Goa Velha)
- (India) Alber Gonsalves (Goa Velha)
- (India) Saprem Diukar (Goa Velha)

== See also ==
- Goa Professional League
