= Albino Gomes =

Indian footballer (born 1994)

Personal information
- Full name: Albino Giovanni Gomes
- Date of birth: 7 February 1994 (age 32)
- Place of birth: Nuvem, Goa, India
- Height: 1.89 m (6 ft 2 in)
- Position: Goalkeeper

Team information
- Current team: Inter Kashi
- Number: 32

Youth career
- Sporting Goa
- Salgaocar

Senior career*
Years	Team	Apps	(Gls)
2013–2016	Salgaocar	36	(0)
2015	→ Mumbai City (loan)	5	(0)
2016–2017	Mumbai City	11	(0)
2016–2017	→ Aizawl (loan)	18	(0)
2017–2019	Delhi Dynamos	8	(0)
2019–2020	Odisha	5	(0)
2020–2022	Kerala Blasters	24	(0)
2022–2023	Churchill Brothers	17	(0)
2023–2024	Sreenidi Deccan	18	(0)
2024–2026	Jamshedpur	40	(0)
2026–	Inter Kashi	2	(0)

International career^{‡}
2026–	India	2	(0)
- * Club domestic league appearances and goals as of 17 October 2026 ‡ National team caps and goals as of 22:00, 6 October 2026 (UTC)

Albino Giovanni Gomes (born 7 February 1994) is an Indian professional footballer who plays as a goalkeeper for Indian Super League club Inter Kashi and the India national team.

== Early life and career ==
Albino Giovanni Gomes was born on 7 February 1994, in Goa, India. He began playing football at the age of 12. Gomes played as a striker but later became a goalkeeper due to his height advantage. Albino began his youth career in Sporting Clube de Goa before moving to Salgaocar.

== Club career ==
=== Salgaocar ===
Gomes was promoted to the Salgaocar first-team for 2012–13 season. He was included in the squad and was benched in the I-League match against Shillong Lajong on 9 February 2013. Being a fourth choice keeper, he didn't get many opportunities to play but won the 2012–13 Goa Professional League where he started in the final game against Churchill Brothers which ended in a 2–1 victory. He continued as a third choice keeper for next two seasons which gave him some gametime in Goa League and won the competition again in 2014–15 season. But didn't manage to make an appearance in any major tournament. On 17 July 2015, he extended his contract for another season. He returned from loan at Mumbai for 2015–16 I-League. It was thought that Gomes would finally get his long-awaited proper debut at a major tournament for Salgaocar as he was second choice keeper behind Karanjit Singh but his luck didn't worked and he remained on the bench in all league and Federation Cup games.

=== Mumbai City ===
On 10 July 2015, during the 2015 Indian Super League draft, Gomes was picked by Mumbai City FC as their final pick. He made his debut and only appearance of the season against Pune City on 5 October 2015. He started and played the whole match but conceded three goals as Mumbai City fell 3–1. On 12 July 2016, Gomes signed for Mumbai on a permanent deal. He was second choice keeper behind Roberto Volpato but managed to make four starts and keep two cleansheets as Mumbai lost to Atletico de Kolkata 3–2 in semifinal where he was benched.

=== Aizawl FC ===
Gomes was signed by Aizawl F.C on loan for the 2016-17 I-League season. He made his debut in a 1–1 draw against East Bengal on 7 January 2017. He kept his first cleansheet in next game against newly promoted Minerva Punjab which ended in a 1–0 win. He was a crucial part of the team as he played every minute as Aizwal won the I-League. He kept eight cleansheets in eighteen appearances. He later made three appearances in Federation Cup including the 1–0 loss to Bengaluru FC in semifinal.

=== Delhi Dynamos ===
Gomes' performance in the I-League prompted Delhi Dynamos to buy him in the 2017–18 ISL Players Draft. He made his debut for the Dynamos against Pune City on 22 November 2017 in a 3–2 win. He also played in the next three games. Unfortunately, he suffered a horrific knee injury which ruled him out for the remaining season. He recovered from injury and returned to training next season. He made his first appearance in 11 months when he came as a substitute for Francisco Dorronsoro at half time in a 2–2 draw against Jamshedpur. He made only three more appearances which were all starts.

=== Odisha FC ===
Albino was included in the squad of rebranded Delhi Dynamos FC, Odisha FC for the 2019–20 Indian Super League season, but was left out of every match due to his injury that occurred during the pre-season.

=== Kerala Blasters ===
On 8 June 2020, Albino signed for Kerala Blasters on a two-year deal. He made his debut for Kerala Blasters against the newly formed ATK Mohun Bagan which ended in a 1–0 loss. In the match against Chennaiyin FC on 29 November 2020, Albino played a pivotal role in securing a point for Kerala Blasters by saving a penalty and saving several shots from the opposition thereby claiming the Man of the Match award and finishing the match with a clean-sheet. The match ended 0–0. During the match against Mumbai City, Albino saved a penalty in the 78th minute, becoming the only goalkeeper to save 3 penalties in a single Indian Super League season since 2015. Albino assisted for the first time in his career for the goal scored by Jordan Murray against SC East Bengal on 15 January 2021 which ended in a 1–1 draw. Thus he became the first Indian goalkeeper and second in overall goalkeepers to have an assist in Indian Super League, second to former Delhi Dynamos goalkeeper, Toni Doblas. He played every minute of Kerala's campaign, making twenty appearances and keeping four cleansheets.

He was named in the Blasters squad for the 2021 Durand Cup, where he started the season with a cleansheet in a 1–0 win over Indian Navy on 11 September 2021. He captained The Blasters for the first time in next game against Bengaluru which ended in a 2–0 loss on 15 September. He played his first match of the 2021–22 Indian Super League against ATK Mohun Bagan in the season opener on 19 November 2021, which they lost 4–2. On 5 December, Albino sustained an injury to his previously operated knee in a match against Odisha FC in a 2–1 win. He was substituted in 73rd minute of the game. The Blasters later confirmed that he has been ruled out for an indefinite period of time. He made only six appearances in the season and kept three cleansheets and departed at the expiry of his contract.

=== Churchill Brothers ===
On 4 November 2022, Gomes penned a one-year deal with Churchill Brothers. He made his debut on 24 November 2022 in a 1–1 draw against Kenkre FC. He kept his cleansheet in next game against Real Kashmir which was forfeited by the later for fielding an extra foreign player. In the reverse match against Kenkre on 22 February 2023, Albino picked up an injury which ruled him out of the remaining season. The match ended in a 3–2 victory. He kept seven cleansheets in seventeen appearances.

=== Sreenidi Deccan ===
On 12 August 2023, Albino joined Sreenidi Deccan on a two-year deal. He made his debut and kept a cleansheet in 5–0 thrashing of TRAU on 19 November 2023.

=== Jamshedpur FC ===
On 13 July 2024, Albino penned a two-year deal with Jamshedpur FC, reuniting with Khalid Jamil for the second time in his career. He made his ISL debut for the club on 17 September 2024 away against FC Goa, playing in goal as his new club secured a 2–1 win.

== International career ==
Gomes was selected by Stephen Constantine for the India U23 side that took part in the 2016 AFC U23 qualifiers. Albino was called up for the national team on several occasion but was left out on the bench.

== Personal life ==
Albino idolised Gianluigi Buffon and former Indian international goalkeeper Subrata Pal.

== Career statistics ==
=== Club ===
As of matches played till 1 February 2024

Club	Season	League			League Cup (Note: Includes Federation Cup and Indian Super Cup)		Durand Cup		AFC		Other		Total	
Club	Season	Division	Apps	Goals	Apps	Goals	Apps	Goals	Apps	Goals	Apps	Goals	Apps	Goals
Salgaocar	2012–13	I-League	0	0	0	0	–		–		3 (Note: Appearance in Goa Professional League)	0	1	0
Salgaocar	2013–14	I-League	0	0	0	0	–		–		6 (Note: Appearances in Goa Professional League)	0	0	0
Salgaocar	2014–15	I-League	0	0	0	0	0	0	–		3 (Note: 1 Appearance in Goa Professional League and 2 Appearances in Goa Knockout Cup)	0	3	0
Salgaocar	2015–16	I-League	0	0	0	0	–		–		0	0	0	0
Salgaocar	Total		0	0	0	0	0	0	0	0	12	0	12	0
Mumbai City (loan)	2015	Indian Super League	1	0	–		–		–		–		1	0
Mumbai City	2016	Indian Super League	4	0	–		–		–		–		4	0
Mumbai City	Total		5	0	0	0	0	0	0	0	0	0	5	0
Aizawl (loan)	2016−17	I-League	18	0	3	0	–		–		–		21	0
Delhi Dynamos	2017−18	Indian Super League	4	0	–		–		–		–		4	0
Delhi Dynamos	2018−19	Indian Super League	4	0	3	0	–		–		–		7	0
Delhi Dynamos	Total		8	0	3	0	0	0	0	0	0	0	11	0
Odisha FC	2019−20	Indian Super League	0	0	–		–		–		–		0	0
Kerala Blasters FC	2020−21	Indian Super League	20	0	–		–		–		–		20	0
Kerala Blasters FC	2021–22	Indian Super League	4	0	–		2	0	–		–		6	0
Kerala Blasters FC	Total		24	0	0	0	2	0	0	0	0	0	26	0
Churchill Brothers	2022–23	I-League	17	0	0	0	–		–		–		17	0
Sreenidi Deccan	2023–24	I-League	7	0	1	0	–		–		–		8	0
Career Total			79	0	7	0	2	0	0	0	0	12	100	0

=== International ===
As of 6 October 2026

National team	Year	Apps	Goals
India	2026	2	0
Total		2	0

== Honours ==
=== Salgaocar ===
- Goa Professional League: 2012–13, 2014–15

=== Aizawl ===
- I-League: 2016–17

=== Kerala Blasters ===
- Indian Super League runner up: 2021–22.
