= I-League transfers for the 2015–16 season =

This is a list of Indian I-League football transfers during the 2015–16 season by club. Only I-League transfers are included.

== Aizawl FC ==
In:

Note: Flags indicate national team as has been defined under FIFA eligibility rules. Players may hold more than one non-FIFA nationality.

No.	Pos.	Nation	Player
—	DF	IND	Ronald Zothanzama (from (India) Dinthar FC)
—	MF	IND	H. Lalmuankima (from (India) Chanmari)
—	DF	IND	Lalruatthara (from (India) Chanmari)
—	MF	IND	Lalbiakhlua (from (India) Mizoram Police FC)
—	FW	IND	F Lalrinpuia (from (India) Mizoram Police FC)

No.	Pos.	Nation	Player

== Bengaluru FC ==
In:

Out:

Note: Flags indicate national team as has been defined under FIFA eligibility rules. Players may hold more than one non-FIFA nationality.

No.	Pos.	Nation	Player
—	FW	IND	Seminlen Doungel (from Shillong Lajong)
—	FW	PRK	Kim Song-Yong (from Royal Wahingdoh)
—	MF	IND	Alwyn George (from (India) Dempo)

No.	Pos.	Nation	Player
—	FW	AUS	Sean Rooney (to (Australia) Oakleigh Cannons FC)
—	MF	IND	Darren Caldeira (released)
—	MF	IND	Shilton D'Silva (released)
—	MF	IND	Malemngamba Meetei (released)

== East Bengal ==
In:

Out:

Note: Flags indicate national team as has been defined under FIFA eligibility rules. Players may hmoremore than one non-FIFA nationality.

No.	Pos.	Nation	Player
—	MF	KOR	Do Dong-hyun (Free Agent)
—	DF	NGA	Bello Razaq (from (India) Mohun Bagan)
—	FW	IND	Bikash Jairu (from Salgaocar)
—	DF	IND	Rahul Bheke (from Mumbai)
—	FW	IND	C. S. Sabeeth (from Mohun Bagan)
—	MF	IND	Jagannath Sana (from (India) United)
—	DF	IND	Jony Raut (from Mohun Bagan)
—	DF	IND	Babu Mondal (from (India) Tollygunge Agragami)
—	MF	IND	Tanmoy Kundu (from (India) Tollygunge Agragami)
—	DF	IND	Samad Ali Mallick (from (India) Rainbow AC)

No.	Pos.	Nation	Player
—	DF	IND	Safar Sardar (to Mohun Bagan)
—	DF	IND	Raju Gaikwad (to Mohun Bagan)

== Mohun Bagan ==
In:

Out:

Note: Flags indicate national team as has been defined under FIFA eligibility rules. Players may hold more than one non-FIFA nationality.

No.	Pos.	Nation	Player
—	FW	HON	Georgie Welcome (from (Thailand) Siam Navy)
—	DF	BRA	Gustavo Silva Conceição (Free Agent)
—	DF	IND	Sanjay Balmuchu (from (India) Mohammedan)
—	DF	IND	Raju Gaikwad (from East Bengal)
—	DF	IND	Safar Sardar (from East Bengal)
—	FW	IND	Subhash Singh (from Bharat)
—	MF	IND	Lenny Rodrigues (from (India) Dempo)
—	GK	IND	Arnab Das Sharma (from (India) Mohammedan)
—	FW	IND	Raja Das (from (India) Kalighat MS)
—	FW	IND	Azharuddin Mallick (from (India) United)

No.	Pos.	Nation	Player
—	DF	NGA	Bello Razaq (to East Bengal)
—	FW	IND	C. S. Sabeeth (to East Bengal)
—	DF	IND	Jony Raut (to East Bengal)

== Mumbai FC ==
In:

Out:

Note: Flags indicate national team as has been defined under FIFA eligibility rules. Players may hold more than one non-FIFA nationality.

No.	Pos.	Nation	Player

No.	Pos.	Nation	Player
—	MF	IND	Ashutosh Mehta (to Bharat)
—	MF	IND	Sampath Kuttymani (to Bharat)
—	DF	IND	Rahul Bheke (to East Bengal)
—	GK	IND	Kunal Sawant (to (India) Laxmi Prasad)
—	DF	IND	Nicholas Rodrigues (to (India) Laxmi Prasad)
—	DF	IND	Valeriano Rebello (to (India) Laxmi Prasad)
—	MF	IND	Climax Lawrence (to (India) Laxmi Prasad)

== Salgaocar ==
In:

Out:

Note: Flags indicate national team as has been defined under FIFA eligibility rules. Players may hold more than one non-FIFA nationality.

No.	Pos.	Nation	Player
—	MF	SCO	Martin Scott (from (Scotland) Raith Rovers F.C.)
—	DF	IND	Keenan Almeida (from Salgaocar)
—	GK	IND	Bruno Colaco (from Dempo)
—	MF	IND	Bersal Vegas (free agent)
—	FW	IND	Virender Singh (from Mumbai U19)
—	DF	IND	Raju Haldankar (from (India) Calangute Association)
—	DF	IND	Perryson Rebello (from (India) SESA F.A.)
—	MF	IND	Charles Miranda (from (India) Churchill Brothers)
—	FW	IND	Chatur Naik (from (India) Dempo)

No.	Pos.	Nation	Player
—	MF	IND	Bikash Jairu (to East Bengal)
—	MF	IND	Anthony Barbosa (to (India) Laxmi Prasad)

== Shillong Lajong ==
In:

Out:

Note: Flags indicate national team as has been defined under FIFA eligibility rules. Players may hold more than one non-FIFA nationality.

No.	Pos.	Nation	Player

No.	Pos.	Nation	Player
—	DF	IND	Seminlen Doungel (to Bengaluru)
—	FW	TRI	Cornell Glen (to Mohun Bagan)

== Sporting Goa ==
In:

Out:

Note: Flags indicate national team as has been defined under FIFA eligibility rules. Players may hold more than one non-FIFA nationality.

No.	Pos.	Nation	Player
—	DF	IND	Ponif Vaz (from (India) SESA)
—	DF	IND	Myron Pereira (from (India) SESA)
—	GK	IND	Fayaz Shaikh (from (India) SESA)
—	DF	IND	Isaac Negredo (from (India) SESA)
—	FW	NGA	Ndidi Chukwuma (Free Agent)
—	MF	IND	Jesmon Soares (from (India) Pune F.C. Academy)
—	MF	IND	Nikhil Naik (from (India) Dempo U19)
—	MF	IND	Harshad Naik (from (India) Calangute Association)
—	MF	IND	Abhishek Rawat (from (India) Hindustan)
—	FW	IND	Delbert Fernandes (from (India) AIFF Elite Academy)

No.	Pos.	Nation	Player
—	DF	IND	Chinta Chandrashekar Rao (to Bharat)
—	FW	IND	Beevan D'Mello (released)
—	MF	IND	Brandon Fernandes (released)
—	DF	IND	Keenan Almeida (released)
—	MF	IND	Velito Cruz (released)
—	GK	IND	Lalit Thapa (released)
—	DF	IND	Sandesh Jhingan (released)
