= 2014 Durand Cup final =

Final of the 127th edition of the Durand Cup

- Event: 2014 Durand Cup
| Salgaocar | Pune |
| 1 | 0 |
- Date: 8 November 2014
- Venue: Raia Sports Complex, Raia, Goa

The 2014 Durand Cup final was a football match on 8 November 2014 at Raia Sports Complex, Raia, Goa. It was the final match of the 2014 Durand Cup, the 127th season of the Durand Cup, a football competition for the Indian football system.

Salgaocar F.C. won the cup by defeating Pune F.C. 1–0.

== Route to the final ==
=== Salgaocar ===
| Round | Opponents | Score |
|---|---|---|
| QF | Indian Navy | 4 – 1 |
| QF | Laxmi Prasad | 1 – 1 |
| SF | Bengaluru FC | 0 – 0 (5 – 4) |

Salgaocar began their campaign with 4–1 win against Indian Navy FC in the quarter finals. In the second game, they could manage only a 1–1 draw against Laxmi Prasad S.C., but it was good enough to place them in the semi-finals against I-League champions, Bengaluru FC. In the semi-finals, after the goalless regulation time and extra time Salgaocar managed to score all the penalties while Bengaluru missed one and Salgaocar entered the finals.

=== Pune ===
| Round | Opponents | Score |
|---|---|---|
| QF | Churchill Brothers | 3 – 0 |
| QF | Vasco | 1 – 0 |
| SF | Sporting Goa | 2 – 1 |

Pune won their group by winning both the games, the first against Churchill Brothers 3-0 and the second 1–0 against Vasco. In the semi-finals, they faced Group B winner Sporting Clube de Goa. In the semi-finals, Pune won 2–1 and entered the finals.
