= 2011 Indian Federation Cup final =

- Event: 2011 Indian Federation Cup
Salgaocar	East Bengal
3	1
- Date: 29 September 2011
- Venue: Salt Lake Stadium, Kolkata
- Referee: Santosh Kumar
- Attendance: 85,000
- Weather: Clear Night

The 2011 Indian Federation Cup final was the 33rd final of the Indian Federation Cup. It was won by Salgaocar of the I-League on 29 September 2011 after beating East Bengal 3-1 at the Salt Lake Stadium.

== Details ==
29 September 2011
18:00 IST

Salgaocar	3 – 1	East Bengal
Edeh 4'; Fernandes 19'; Sueoka 66'	Report	Alan Gow 26'

Salt Lake Stadium, Kolkata
Attendance: 85,000
Referee: Santosh Kumar

Salgaocar	East Bengal

Salgaocar:
GK	1	(India) Karanjit Singh
RB	14	(India) Biswajit Saha
CB	20	(Brazil) Luciano Sabrosa (c)
CB	4	(India) Irungbam Khelemba Singh
LB	2	(India) Jaspal Singh
DM	25	(India) Rocus Lamare
DM	7	(India) W. Tomba Singh
AM	30	(India) Francis Fernandes
RW	15	(India) Ishfaq Ahmed
LW	28	(Nigeria) Junior Obagbemiro
CF	10	(Nigeria) Chidi Edeh
Substitutes:
FW	11	(Japan) Ryuji Sueoka
MF	37	(India) Gilbert Oliveira
DF	23	(India) Rahul Kumar
Manager:
(Morocco) Karim Bencherifa

East Bengal:
GK	24	(India) Sandip Nandy
RB	29	(India) Saumik Dey
CB	4	(Nigeria) Uga Samuel Okpara (c)
CB	4	(India) Raju Gaikwad
LB	7	(India) Harmanjyot Khabra
RM	8	(India) Sushanth Mathew
CM	14	(India) Mehtab Hossain
CM	18	(Nigeria) Penn Orji
LM	12	(India) Reisangmei Vashum
CF	15	(Scotland) Alan Gow
CF	23	(India) Robin Singh
Substitutes:
MF	22	(India) Sanju Pradhan
FW	10	(Australia) Tolgay Ozbey
MF	11	(India) Khemtang Paite
Manager:
(England) Trevor Morgan

MAN OF THE MATCH

- Chidi Edeh (Salgaocar)

MATCH RULES

- 90 minutes.
- 30 minutes of extra-time if necessary.
- Penalty shoot-out if scores still level.
- Seven named substitutes.
- Maximum of three substitutions.

== See also ==
- 2011 Indian Federation Cup
