= Saran Singh Thangjam =

Indian footballer

Saran Singh
Personal information
- Full name: Saran Singh Thangjam
- Date of birth: 1 March 1987 (age 39)
- Place of birth: Manipur, India
- Height: 1.74 m (5 ft 9 in)

Team information
- Current team: Churchill Brothers (assistant)

Senior career*
Years	Team	Apps	(Gls)
2007–2009	Churchill Brothers		
2009–2010	JCT		
2010–2014	Churchill Brothers	36	(0)
2014	Salgaocar	17	(0)
2015	→ Mumbai City (loan)		
2016	Mohun Bagan		
2017–2019	NEROCA		
2019–2020	Bhawanipore		
2021–2022	Churchill B		
- * Club domestic league appearances and goals

Saran Singh Thangjam (Meitei: Thangjam Saran Singh, born 1 March 1987) is an Indian football coach and former professional player who played as a midfielder.

== Career ==
In 2007, Singh signed for Churchill Brothers. In 2009, he suffered a major knee injury and had to undergo a surgery. In 2009-10 I-League season he had donned the colours of JCT FC. On 30 July 2014, it was confirmed that Thangjam has signed for Salgaocar F.C. He scored the winner for Salgaocar in 2014 Durand Cup final.

== Honours ==
=== Club ===
- I-League (2): 2008–09, 2012-13
- Durand Cup (3): 2007, 2009, 2011, 2014
- Federation Cup (1): 2014
- IFA Shield (1): 2011 IFA Shield
- Goa Professional League (1): 2008
