= Rocus Lamare =

Indian footballer

Personal information
- Date of birth: 22 September 1986 (age 40)
- Place of birth: Shillong, Meghalaya, India
- Height: 1.67 m (5 ft 5 1/2 in)
- Position: Midfielder

Youth career
- 2002–2003: Shillong Lajong

Senior career*
Years	Team	Apps	(Gls)
2003–2004	Mohun Bagan		
2004–2016	Salgaocar		

International career
2002	India U17		
- India U20
2004–2014	India	14	(0)
- * Club domestic league appearances and goals as of 18 July 2016

Rocus Lamare (born 22 September 1986) is an Indian professional footballer who plays as a midfielder for Salgaocar in the I-League.

== Career ==
Born in Shillong, Meghalaya, Lamare started his career with the Shillong Lajong youth academy before moving to Mohun Bagan. While with the Kolkata club, Lamare played in the National Football League. At the end of the 2003–04 season, Lamare moved to Goa to sign with Salgaocar. During his twelve seasons with Salgaocar, Lamare helped the club win the I-League and the Federation Cup in 2011. Following that season, Lamare was selected to be part of the 2011–12 FPAI Team of the Year.

On 18 July 2016, it was revealed that Lamare had been released by Salgaocar before the 2016–17 season.

== International ==
Lamare had represented India at the youth level at both under-17 and under-20 levels. Lamare also represented the senior India side from 2004 to 2014.

== Honours ==
Salgaocar

- I-League: 2010–11
- Federation Cup: 2011
- Durand Cup: 2014

India

- SAFF Championship: 2011
