= Ethan Vaz =

Indian chess grandmaster (born 2011)

Personal information
- Born: 3 September 2011 (age 14) Raia, Goa, India

Chess career
- Country: India
- Title: International Master (2024)
- FIDE rating: 2529 (July 2026)
- Peak rating: 2529 (July 2026)

Ethan Vaz (born 3 September 2011) is an Indian chess player who holds the title of International Master, and is a grandmaster-elect. A chess prodigy, he achieved the International Master title at the age of 12, becoming the youngest player in the world to hold the title at the time. In 2025, he won five medals at the Western Asia Youth Chess Championships.

He played against fellow prodigy Tanitoluwa Adewumi in the Checkmate: USA vs India exhibition event.

== Chess career ==
Ethan started playing chess in 2017, at the age of 6. Following a hiatus from tournaments for over two years due to the COVID-19 pandemic, he resumed play in 2022 and rapidly gained rating. He earned his first International Master norm at the Sharjah Masters in August 2023. He earned his second norm three months later in November, and his final norm on January 3, 2024.

In September 2024, he won the gold medal in the under-16 category of the Commonwealth Chess Championship.

In June 2026, he qualified for the Grandmaster (GM) title after winning the Sarajevo GM Mix tournament with an undefeated score of 7/9 to earn his final GM norm.
