= Mauvin Borges =

Indian professional footballer

Personal information
- Date of birth: 18 March 1995 (age 31)
- Place of birth: Nuvem, Goa, India
- Height: 1.72 m (5 ft 7 1/2 in)
- Position: Striker

Team information
- Current team: Sporting Clube de Goa

Youth career
- SESA F.A.

Senior career*
Years	Team	Apps	(Gls)
2013–2019	Sporting Clube de Goa	20	(0)
2019–	Churchill Brothers	0	(0)
- * Club domestic league appearances and goals as of 30 May 2014

Mauvin Borges (born 18 March 1995) is an Indian professional footballer who plays as a striker for Sporting Clube de Goa in the I-League.

== Career ==
=== Youth ===
Born in Nuvem, Goa, Mauvin started his youth career with SESA F.A. He was the captain for the Goa U-16 football team in the 2009 Mir Iqbal Hussain Trophy which was held in Pune.

He was also the captain for the Goa U-19 team at 2011 B.C. Roy Trophy which was held in Siliguri, West Bengal from 18 January to 29th 2012.

In 2013, he was felicitated for being the most promising U-20 player by GFA when he was with Sesa FA.

=== Sporting Goa ===
Borges made his professional debut for Sporting Goa in the I-League on 29 September 2013 against Prayag United S.C. at the Kalyani Stadium in which he came on as a substitute for Victorino Fernandes in the 69th minute; as Sporting Goa lost the match 3–1.

== Career statistics ==
As of 3 May 2014

Club	Season	League			Federation Cup		Durand Cup		AFC		Total	
Club	Season	Apps	Goals	Apps	Goals	Apps	Goals	Apps	Goals	Apps	Goals	
Sporting Goa	2013-14	9	0	0	0	0	0	-	-	9	0	
Sporting Goa	2014-15	9	0	0	0	0	0	-	-	9	0	
Career total			18	0	0	0	0	0	0	0	18	0
