= Wilton Gomes =

Indian footballer

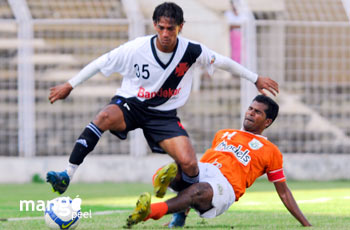
- Gomes with Sporting Clube de Goa in 2008

Personal information
- Full name: Wilton Gomes
- Date of birth: 30 October 1980 (age 46)
- Place of birth: Goa, India
- Height: 1.73 m (5 ft 8 in)
- Position: Midfielder

Team information
- Current team: Sporting Clube de Goa
- Number: 14

Senior career*
Years	Team	Apps	(Gls)
2005–	Sporting Clube de Goa	??	(??)
- * Club domestic league appearances and goals

Wilton Gomes (born 30 October 1980) is a retired Indian professional footballer who last played for Sporting Clube de Goa in the I-League as a midfielder.
