= 2011 Indian Federation Cup =

33rd edition of the Federation Cup

2011 Federation Cup
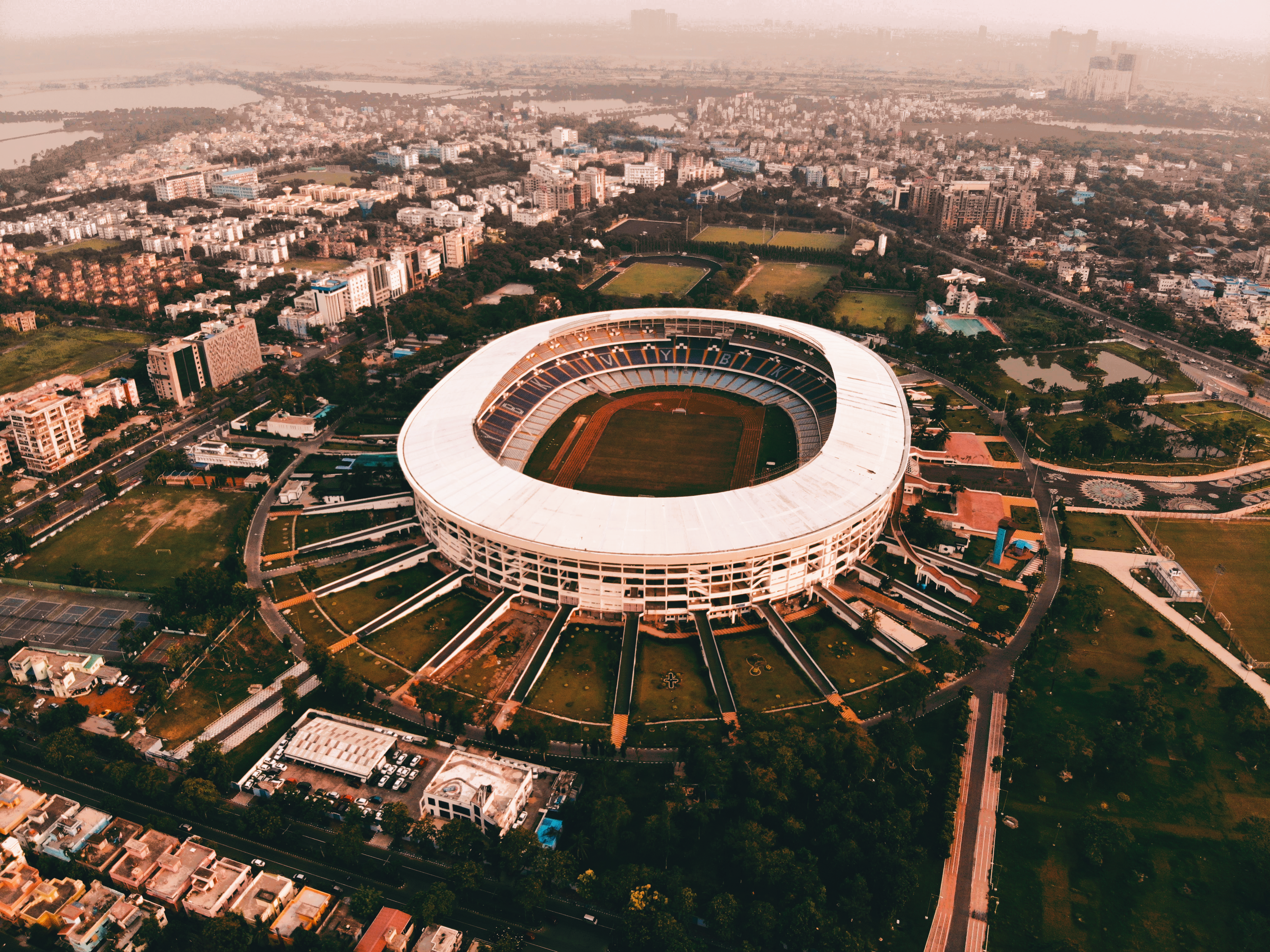
- Salt Lake Stadium hosted the final on 29 September 2011

Tournament details
- Country: India
- Teams: 21

Final positions
- Champions: Salgaocar (4th title)
- Runners-up: East Bengal
- AFC Cup: East Bengal

Tournament statistics
- Matches played: 51
- Goals scored: 84 (1.65 per match)
- Top goal scorer(s): Chidi Edeh; Henry Antchouet

The 2011 Indian Federation Cup was the 33rd season of the knock-out competition. On 13 August 2011 the AIFF announced that 21 clubs had been accepted to the tournament.

The tournament Qualifiers commence from 8 September to 13 September and Final Group Round quarterfinals start from 17 September. The winner of this prestigious tournament will book their place in 2012 AFC Cup.

East Bengal qualifies for 2012 AFC Cup because Salgaocar S.C. already qualified via them being I-League champions.

== Teams ==
Round	Clubs remaining	Winners from previous round	New entries this round	Leagues entering at this round
Qualifying Round	21	none	21	2011 2nd Division Final Round Teams + ONGC FC
Final Group Phrase	16	2	14	I-League
Semi-Finals	4	4	none	none
Final	2	2	none	none

== Qualifying round ==
=== Group A ===
Team	Pld	W	D	L	GF	GA	GD	Pts
Mohammedan SC	2	2	0	0	2	0	+2	6
Vasco	2	0	1	1	0	0	0	1
Ar-Hima	2	0	1	1	0	1	−1	1

- 8 September 2011: Mohammedan SC 1 – 0 Ar-Hima
- 10 September 2011: Ar-Hima 0 – 0 Vasco
- 12 September 2011: Vasco 0 – 1 Mohammedan SC

=== Group B ===
Team	Pld	W	D	L	GF	GA	GD	Pts
Royal Wahingdoh	3	3	0	0	5	1	+4	9
United Sikkim	3	2	0	1	4	3	+1	6
Southern Samity	3	1	0	2	2	3	−1	3
ONGC	3	0	0	3	4	8	−4	0

- 9 September 2011: Southern Samity 0 – 1 Royal Wahingdoh
- 9 September 2011: United Sikkim 3 – 2 ONGC
- 11 September 2011: Royal Wahingdoh 1 – 0 United Sikkim
- 11 September 2011: ONGC 1 – 2 Southern Samity
- 13 September 2011: Royal Wahingdoh 3 – 1 ONGC
- 13 September 2011: United Sikkim 1 – 0 Southern Samity

== Final group phase ==
=== Group A ===
Group A will play in Pune

Team	Pld	W	D	L	GF	GA	GD	Pts
Shillong Lajong	3	2	0	1	5	4	+1	6
Royal Wahingdoh	3	2	0	1	4	3	+1	6
Churchill Brothers	3	1	1	1	4	3	+1	4
Mohun Bagan	3	0	1	2	4	7	−3	1

=== Group B ===
Group B will play in Pune

Team	Pld	W	D	L	GF	GA	GD	Pts
Salgaocar	3	2	1	0	7	0	+7	7
Pailan Arrows	3	2	0	1	3	4	−1	6
Mumbai	3	1	1	1	3	3	0	4
HAL S.C.	3	0	0	3	1	7	−6	0

=== Group C ===
Group C played in Kolkata

Team	Pld	W	D	L	GF	GA	GD	Pts
East Bengal	3	2	1	0	4	2	+2	7
Pune	3	1	1	1	3	3	0	4
Dempo	3	1	0	2	4	4	0	3
Mohammedan	3	0	2	1	2	4	−2	2

=== Group D ===
Group D will play in Kolkata

Team	Pld	W	D	L	GF	GA	GD	Pts
Prayag United	3	2	1	0	3	1	+2	7
Sporting Clube de Goa	3	2	0	1	4	3	+1	6
Air India FC	3	1	1	1	4	4	0	4
Chirag United Club Kerala	3	0	0	3	2	5	−3	0

== Semi-finals ==
25 September 2011
6:00 pm IST

Salgaocar	1–0	Shillong Lajong
Edeh 90+1'	Report

Salt Lake Stadium, Kolkata
Attendance: 20,456
Referee: Pratap Singh
26 September 2011
6:00 pm IST

East Bengal	2–1	Prayag United
Gow 38'; Paite 83'	Report	Dutta 17'

Salt Lake Stadium, Kolkata
Attendance: 75,364
Referee: Mangho Singh

== Final ==
29 September 2011
18:00 IST

East Bengal	1–3	Salgaocar
Gow 26'	Report	Edeh 5'; Fernandes 17'; Sueoka 67'

Salt Lake Stadium, Kolkata
Attendance: 85,000
Referee: M. B. Santhosh Kumar

== Top goal scorers ==
Rank	Player	Club	Goals
1	(Gabon) Henry Antchouet	Churchill Brothers	4
1	(Nigeria) Chidi Edeh	Salgaocar	4
2	(Scotland) Alan Gow	East Bengal	3
3	(Nigeria) Daniel Bedemi	United Sikkim	2
3	(Nigeria) Ogba Kalu Nnanna	Sporting Clube de Goa	2
3	(India) Khangebam Jibon Singh	Pailan Arrows	2
3	(Liberia) Johnny Menyongar	Shillong Lajong	2
3	(India) Robin Singh	East Bengal	2
3	(India) Khemtang Paite	East Bengal	2
3	(Brazil) Roberto Mendes Silva	Churchill Brothers	2
3	(Nigeria) Henry Ezeh	Air India	2
3	(India) Jeje Lalpekhlua	Pune	2
3	(Bhutan) Chencho	Royal Wahingdoh	2
3	(India) Jackichand Singh	Royal Wahingdoh	2
3	(Nigeria) Stanley Okoroigwe	Mohammedan	2

== Telecast ==
Brand Value Communications Ltd. broadcast all 27 final group phase matches of the competition through their channels News Time Bangla and News Time Assam in West Bengal and Assam respectively. On 20 September, DD Sports announced that they would telecast the matches starting with the two games that ended the group phase on 22 September. DD Sports also aired the semi-finals and final.

== See also ==
- I-League
- Federation Cup (India)
