= David Opara =

Nigerian footballer (born 1985)

N.D.Opara
Personal information
- Full name: Nbusiyu David Opara
- Date of birth: 14 December 1985 (age 40)
- Place of birth: Lagos, Nigeria
- Height: 1.85 m (6 ft 1 in)
- Position: Forward

Team information
- Current team: Laxmi Prasad S.C.

Senior career*
Years	Team	Apps	(Gls)
2009–2010	Air India		
2010–2011	ONGC		
2011–2012	Churchill Brothers		
2012–2013	Mumbai	14	(5)
2014–2015	Laxmi Prasad		
2015	Hindustan Eagles		
2015—	Laxmi Prasad		
- * Club domestic league appearances and goals

Nbusiyu David Opara (born 14 December 1985) is a Nigerian football player, who plays for Laxmi Prasad S.C. in the Goa Professional League.
