= Boima Karpeh =

Liberian footballer (born 1984)

Boima Jerry Karpeh
Personal information
- Full name: Boima Jerry Karpeh
- Date of birth: 16 June 1984 (age 42)
- Place of birth: Monrovia, Liberia
- Height: 1.88 m (6 ft 2 in)
- Position: Striker

Senior career*
Years	Team	Apps	(Gls)
2001−2002	Dianella White Eagles	17	(12)
2003	Bayswater City	21	(14)
2004	Fremantle City	16	(9)
2005	Perth	17	(10)
2006−2007	Floreat Athena	21	(25)
2007−2008	Perth Glory	0	(0)
2008	Whittlesea Zebras	25	(9)
2009−2010	Oakleigh Cannons	42	(18)
2011	Churchill Brothers	24	(4)
2011−2012	Persisam Putra Samarinda	23	(7)
2012−2013	Persiram Raja Ampat	2	(0)
2013	Pune	7	(6)
2013−2015	Sporting Goa	26	(11)
2015	South China	0	(0)
2016	Kingston City	25	(10)
2017–2018	Springvale White Eagles	7	(3)
- * Club domestic league appearances and goals as of 07:44, 28 January 2015 (UTC) ‡ National team caps and goals as of 6 December 2007

Boima Karpeh (born 16 June 1984), also known as Jerry Karpeh, is a Liberian former footballer who plays as a striker.

== Biography ==
Karpeh was the Football West State League top goal scorer in 2007 playing for Floreat Athena where he won the club's Fairest & Best Award.

A-League club Perth Glory signed Karpeh during the 2007/2008 season playing seven games for the club.

Karpeh trialled with A-League club Newcastle Jets in September 2007 but a contract was not negotiated between Karpeh and the club.

Scoring many goals for his next clubs he then made a decision in 2011 to move to India and play for Churchill Brothers and become winner of the 2011 IFA Shield Cup with them.

Next year found him in Indonesia having a complete season with 23 games and 7 goals scored for Persisam Putra Samarinda.

In August 2012 Jerry received invitation to travel in Iran and negotiate a contract with Sanat Naft but a contract wasn't established due to visa problems.

Lately in January 2013 returned to India for the second time and signed a five-month contract until end of season to play for Pune FC and scored his first goal by opening the score in club's biggest win ever against United Sikkim. In the I-League match against Shillong Lajong F.C. on 25 March, he was brought in as a substitute for Pierre Djidjia Douhou on the 46th minute, and he equalised from a Jeje Lalpekhlua pass on the 51st minute, and then equalised again on the 59th minute from an Othallo Tabia cross to ensure a 2-2 draw.

== Personal life ==
Karpeh's brother, Kailo Karpeh, played for Liberian club Jubilee FC and Australian club Bayswater City SC.

== Honors ==
Perth

- Football West State League Premier Division : 2005

Floreat Athena

- Football West State League Premier Division : 2007

Churchill Brothers

- 2011 IFA Shield winner

Putra Samarinda

- Inter Island Cup runner-up: 2012

Individual

- Football West State League Premier Division Top Scorer: 2007
- Durand Cup Top scorer: 2014
