= Gilbert Oliveira =

Indian footballer

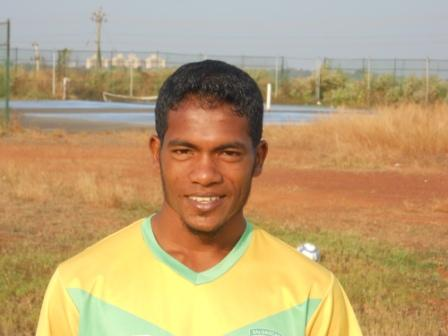

Personal information
- Date of birth: 31 May 1990 (age 36)
- Place of birth: Margao, Goa, India
- Height: 1.55 m (5 ft 1 in)
- Position: Winger

Team information
- Current team: Churchill Brothers

Youth career
- 2006–2010: Salgaocar

Senior career*
Years	Team	Apps	(Gls)
2010–2016	Salgaocar	92	(16)
2015	→ Chennaiyin (loan)	0	(0)
2018–	Churchill Brothers	0	(0)
- * Club domestic league appearances and goals as of 20:09, 14 October 2018 (UTC)

Gilbert Oliveira (born 31 May 1990) is an Indian footballer who plays as a winger for Churchill Brothers of the I-League.

== Career ==
=== Salgaocar ===
Gilbert was born on 31 May 1990 in Goa. He was playing in the inter-village tournaments when he was spotted and signed for I-League team Salgaocar S.C. and at the age of 16 was put in the u19's squad. Gilbert stayed with the under-19 squad for three years before joining the first team for the 2010–11 I-League. Speaking about his time with the youth Gilbert said "the youth development programme was excellent! My coaches really helped me in my quality of passing, ball possession, discipline, etc." He made his debut for the Salgaocar first team on 7 December 2012 in the 2nd Round of the 2010-11 I-League season in Salgaocar's 4–3 victory over Chirag United in which he also managed to score his first two goals of his professional career. In the sixteenth round of the I-League season Gilbert scored two more goals against ONGC which brought his tally to five that season. In the seventeenth round Gilbert scored a goal against HAL. After his first season in professional football Gilbert finished with 6 goals in 17 matches.

Olivera's 2011-12 footballing season started off great for him as he started as a normal starter for Salgaocar. He started Salgaocar's first match of the season in the 2011 Indian Federation Cup against Mumbai F.C. where they drew 0-0. He then played in his third match of the Federation Cup on 22 September 2011 and he even scored a goal as Salgaocar won 3–0 against normal I-League team Pailan Arrows. Then on 29 September 2011 Olivera came on as a sub during the 2011 Indian Federation Cup Final win over East Bengal. He then made his club international debut against Al-Oruba on 7 March 2012 in the 2012 AFC Cup. Salgaocar lost 0–1. He then scored his first Asian and club international goal of his career against Neftchi in his second club international game of his career on 21 March 2012.

==== Chennaiyin (loan) ====
On 18 November 2015, Oliveira was signed by Indian Super League side, Chennaiyin, as a replacement for Dhanpal Ganesh.

== Career statistics ==
=== Club ===
As of 30 May 2015

Club	Season	League		Federation Cup		AFC		Total	
Club	Season	Apps	Goals	Apps	Goals	Apps	Goals	Apps	Goals
Salgaocar	2010–11	17	6	0	0	—	—	17	6
Salgaocar	2011–12	11	1	4	1	5	1	17	3
Salgaocar	2012–13	9	0	3	0	—	—	12	0
Salgaocar	2013–14	24	6	3	1	—	—	27	7
Salgaocar	2014–15	17	2	5	0	—	—	22	2
Career total		78	15	15	2	5	1	98	17
