= Raia, Goa =

Raia
- Village
- Location of Raia in Goa Raia (India)
- Coordinates: 15°18′N 73°58′E
- Country: India
- State: Goa
- District: South Goa

Government
  - Body: Panchayat

Population
  - Total: 10,706

Languages
  - Official: Konkani
- Time zone: UTC+5:30 (IST)
- PIN: 403720
- Telephone code: 0832
- Vehicle registration: GA
- Nearest city: Margao
- Vidhan Sabha constituency: Curtorim
- Website: goa.gov.in

Raia (Goan Konkani: Rai) is a quaint village in the Salcete taluka of South Goa district, Goa state, India. It is located 4 km (2.5 mi) east from the district headquarters of Margao and 35 km (22 mi) from the state capital Panjim.

== Location ==
Gogol (two kilometres), Margao (three kilometres), and Aquem Margao (three kilometres) are nearby areas. Raia is surrounded by Mormugao taluk towards the west, Quepem taluk towards its south, Ponda taluka towards the north. Raia village lies close to the villages of Loutulim, Camurlim, Rachol and Maina.

It lies at the border of the North Goa District and the South Goa District. Ponda is North Goa District is just across Raia. Since it lies near the Arabian Sea, the weather can be humid for part of the year.

Raia village falls under the Goa Assembly constituency of Curtorim for electoral purposes. Raia's PIN code is 403720 and its postal office is Raia itself.

== Population ==
For the purposes of the Census, Raia is considered to be a "census town" (though it is a panchayat area) and in 2011 had a population of 10,706—comprising 5,256 males and 5,450 females as per report released by Census India 2011.

Male literacy was 90.15% and female, 84.72%. There were 1037 women for every 1000 males, indicating perhaps the high out-migration from the area, mainly for temporary employment overseas and elsewhere. Raia had 1106 children under six years of age in 2011, of whom 585 were male and 521 female.

The Christian population of Raia in 2011 was 7,574 (70.75%) and there were 2,399 (22.4%) Hindus and 705 (6.59%) Muslims. The Scheduled Tribe population was 2,968 and there were 66 Scheduled Caste members, according to the censusndia.co.in site.

Raia has a significant agrarian population, whose lives are sometimes affected by the vagaries of the monsoons.

== History ==
Pe. Jorge Paulino da Piedade Sequeira, a priest from the area, wrote a book titled Raia e Camorlim. Para a História das Aldeias, (Raia and Camorlim: About the History of the Villages), published by the Xaverian Press at Pilar in 1972. Camorlim is a village between Raia and Loutolim.

According to former Indian Union minister Eduardo Faleiro, Raia "derives its name from Agni Mukha Roy, one of the earlier Kadamba kings who established his headquarters in this village." Faleiro cites Fr. Jorge Sequeira to suggest that, in the past, the village was known variously as Rayanagara, Rajapur and Rayapur, and with the decline of the Kadamba dynasty it became known simply as Raya and then Raia.

The earlier ruling empire of the Kadambas are believed to have brought the deity of Kamakshi to the village, the temple of which was destroyed during Portuguese rule, with the deity being shifted across the river to Rai Shiroda, a locality on the other bank of the river beyond the then Portuguese territory.

Raia was the first village in Salcette to have been Christianised, when its populace was converted en masse to Christianity in 1560.

Raia (with Margao, Verna, Curtorim, Loutolim, Benaulim, Betalbatim, Colva, Cortalim, Quelossim, Nagoa and Sancoale-Dabolim) was among 12 villages of Salcete represented at the Camara Geral do Concelho, or the general assembly of Communidades at the sub-district or taluka level. The Camaras Gerais ou Agrarias were extinguished by the Code of Communidades of 1904 and substituted by Administrators of Communidades. The Comunidades were cooperative associations governed by heads of family, called gaunkars. Originally based on collective ownership of land by a group of villagers, this system saw a certain portion of the total agrarian produce earmarked for village welfare, a part as the government share, and the balance distributed among the members as dividend or jono (zonn). Over time, Comunidades lost their original character and turned into mere societies of gaunkars who had membership based on accident of birth. Non-gaunkars who came subsequently and also contributed to the development of the village had no say in the Comunidades, with many gaunkars living outside the area from which they are entitled to jono. Women family members also have no right to membership. Comunidades ceased to be collective farming societies, and village development activities which were the preserve of the gaunkaris (a pre-Portuguese name for the Comunidades) and now entrusted to the gram panchayat.

Raikars (villagers of Raia) are known as wag (tigers).

== Church ==
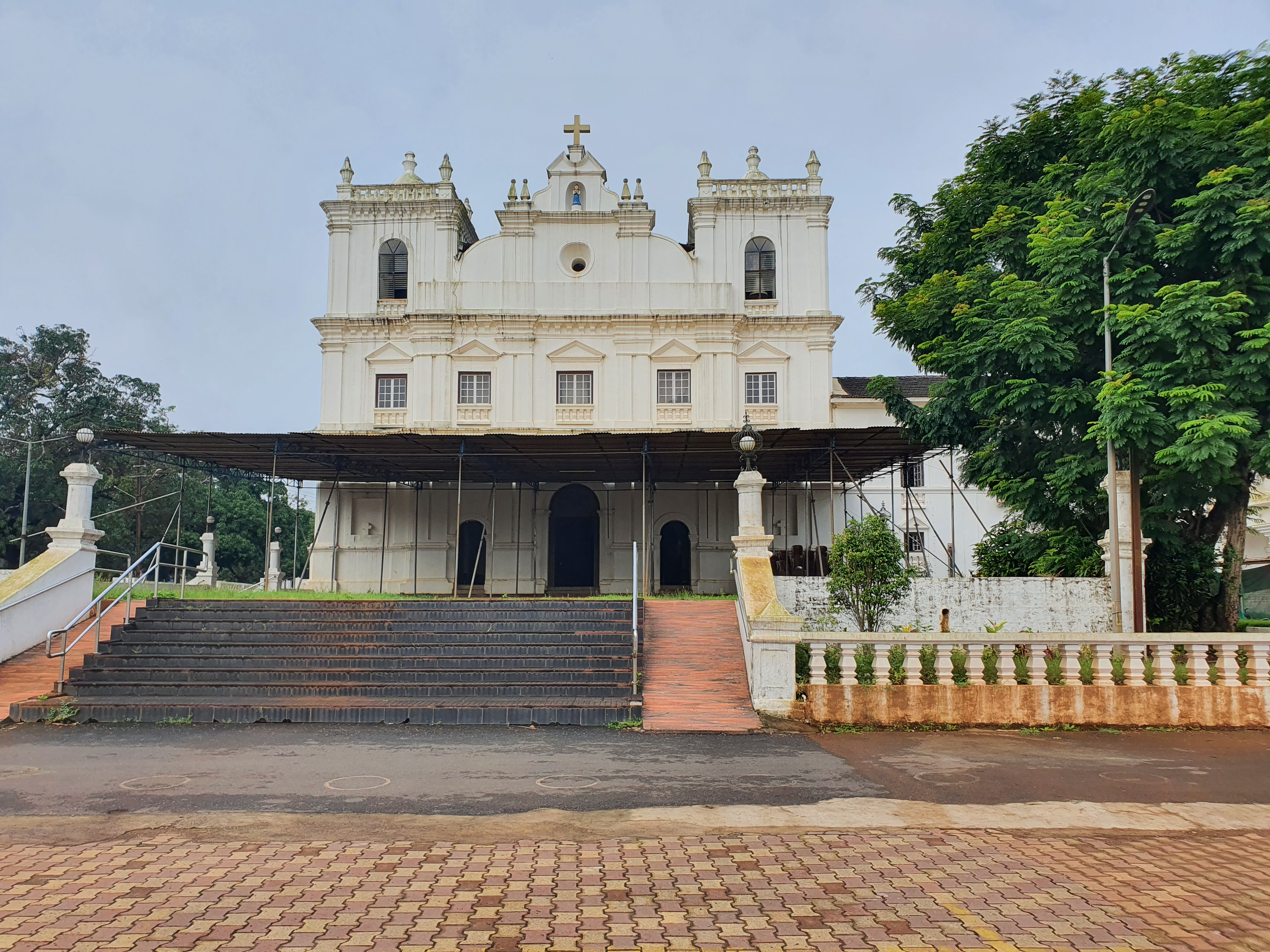
Church of Our lady of Snows Raia

After conversions to Christianity, locals helped build a church dedicated to Our Lady of the Snows ( Nossa Senhora das Neves ).

The church was founded by the Jesuits of Rachol in 1699 and has the same Patron Saint as Rachol. The foundation for the church was laid in 1668. The church was built by the Raia and Camurlim communidades. The Priests who built the Raia church were from Santa Maria Majore which has a special devotion to Our Lady of Snows and so they dedicated the Raia church also to their patroness. The Our Lady of Snows Church, Raia, Goa has evolved considerably with time from the first church built of mud to the later one built of sand and brick by the Jesuits to the current magnificent structure.

The Religious Orders present in the Parish of Our Lady of Snows Church, Raia, Goa are The Religious Men of the Society of Jesus (SJ) and the Society of the Divine Word (SVD). The Religious Women in the Raia Parish are The Handmaids of Christ (HC). The Society of Jesus (SJ) is based at The Pedro Arrupe Institute, St Xavier Street, Damon, Raia, Goa. The Society of the Divine Word (SVD) are based at the SVD Mission seminary, Raia, Goa. The Handmaids of Christ (HC) are based at St Theresa Convent, Ganapoga, Raia, Goa.

== Harvest festival ==
Raia hosts a harvest feast, locally called the Konsache Fest in Konkani, which is celebrated on 5 August every year. The feast Mass is celebrated at Our Lady of Snows Church, Raia.

== Raikars, Konkani song and other features ==
Raikars of the skilled Daivadnya Brahmin (sonar) community were originally from Raia, Goa, and hence some members of the community carry the village's name as part of their surname — Raikar.

Raia, together with the nearby villages of Curtorim and Loutolim, was home to, and the nursery of, many of the Mando (plural mandde) form of prominent Goan Konkani song.

Some of the local institutions have deployed solar power.

== Spanish flu in 1918–19 ==
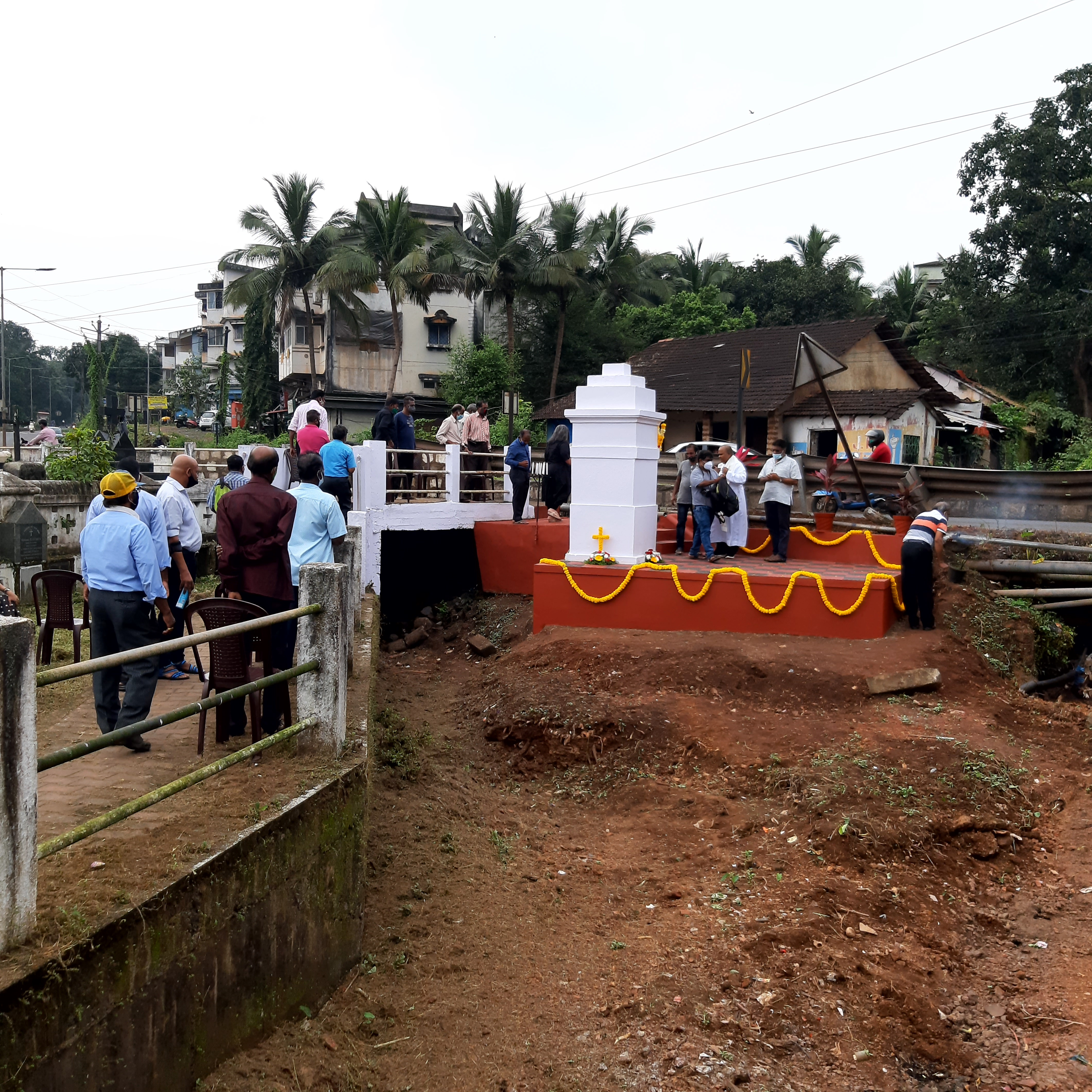
Spanish flu victims' memorial at Raia

The village of Raia was one of the villages in the state of Goa which is believed to have suffered badly due to the Spanish flu pandemic around 1918–1919.

Andrew Pereira argues that Raia was among the villages most badly hit in Goa due to the 1918-19 Spanish flu pandemic. A memorial pillar stands tall outside the present cemetery of Raia, constructed in memory of the Spanish flu victims a year later in 1919. The aftermath of the Spanish flu lasted for a year till 1919.

The nearly nine feet tall tombstone bears the words – ‘E.M. (EM MEMORIA) DAS VICTIMAS DE GRIPE DE 1918 (In memory of the victims of flu in 1918).

== Sports ==
Raia has one of the oldest sporting club in the State of Goa. Fernando Menezes, who is a doctor from Raia, Ganapoga was a student of “Escola Medica de Goa” (presently known as Goa Medical College) who formed the club and initially named it Clube Autrpelia de Raia. In 1957 the name was changed to Raia Sporting Club.

Initially players played football barefoot. Peter D’souza, Professor Silvester Fernandes, Pedro Inacio Pinheiro and late Pedro Fernandes got the club registered with the Goa Football Association. Peter D'Souza started the "Custodio Memorial Trophy" in memory of his brother Custodio D'Souza in 1971 to commemorate his memory. It is the oldest inter-village tournament in the state.

In June 2026, Ethan Vaz from Raia became India's 96th Chess Grandmaster at the age of 14.

== Gallery ==
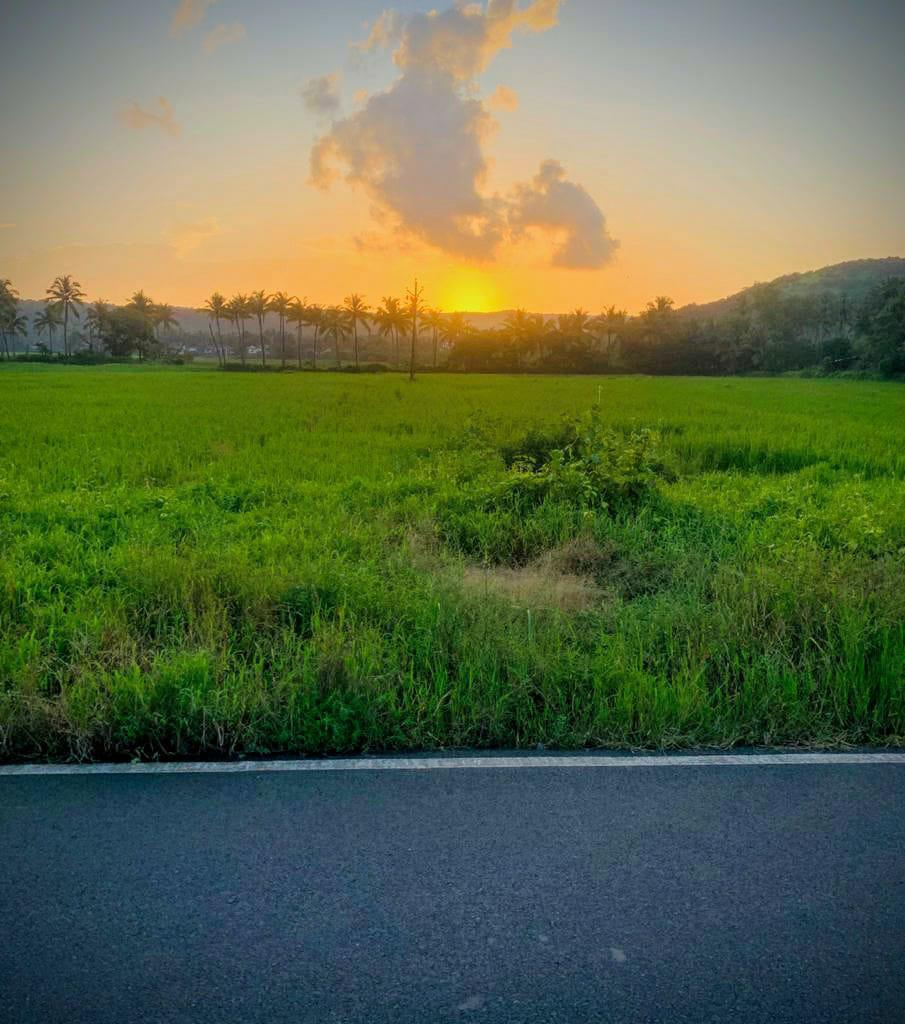
Raia, the setting

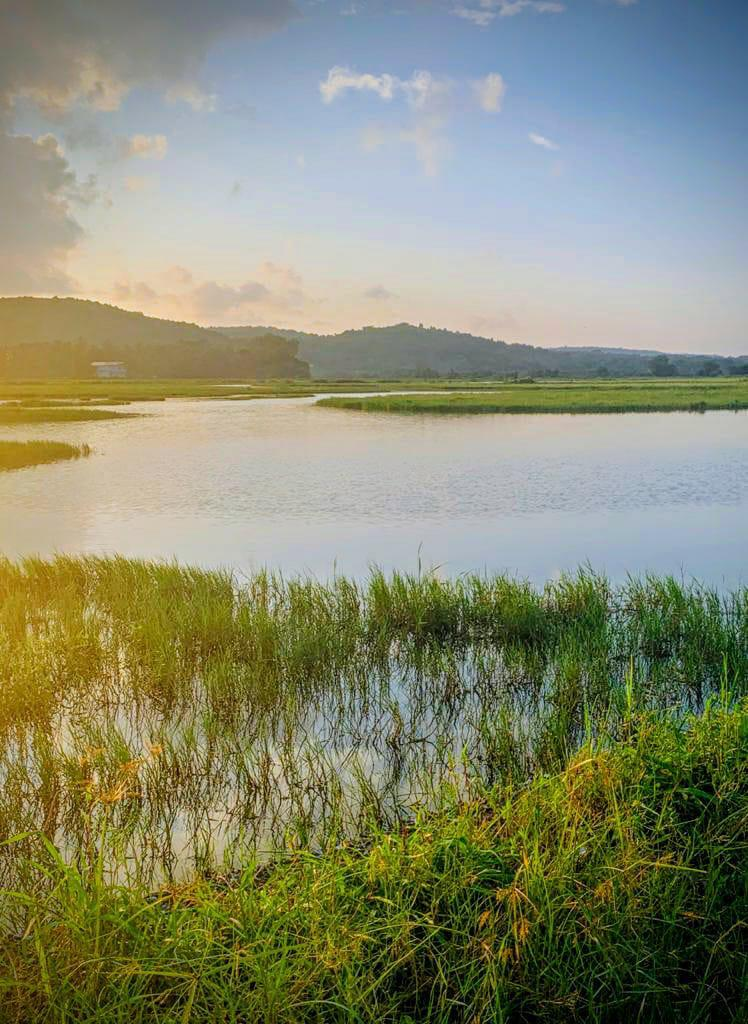
Scenic Raia

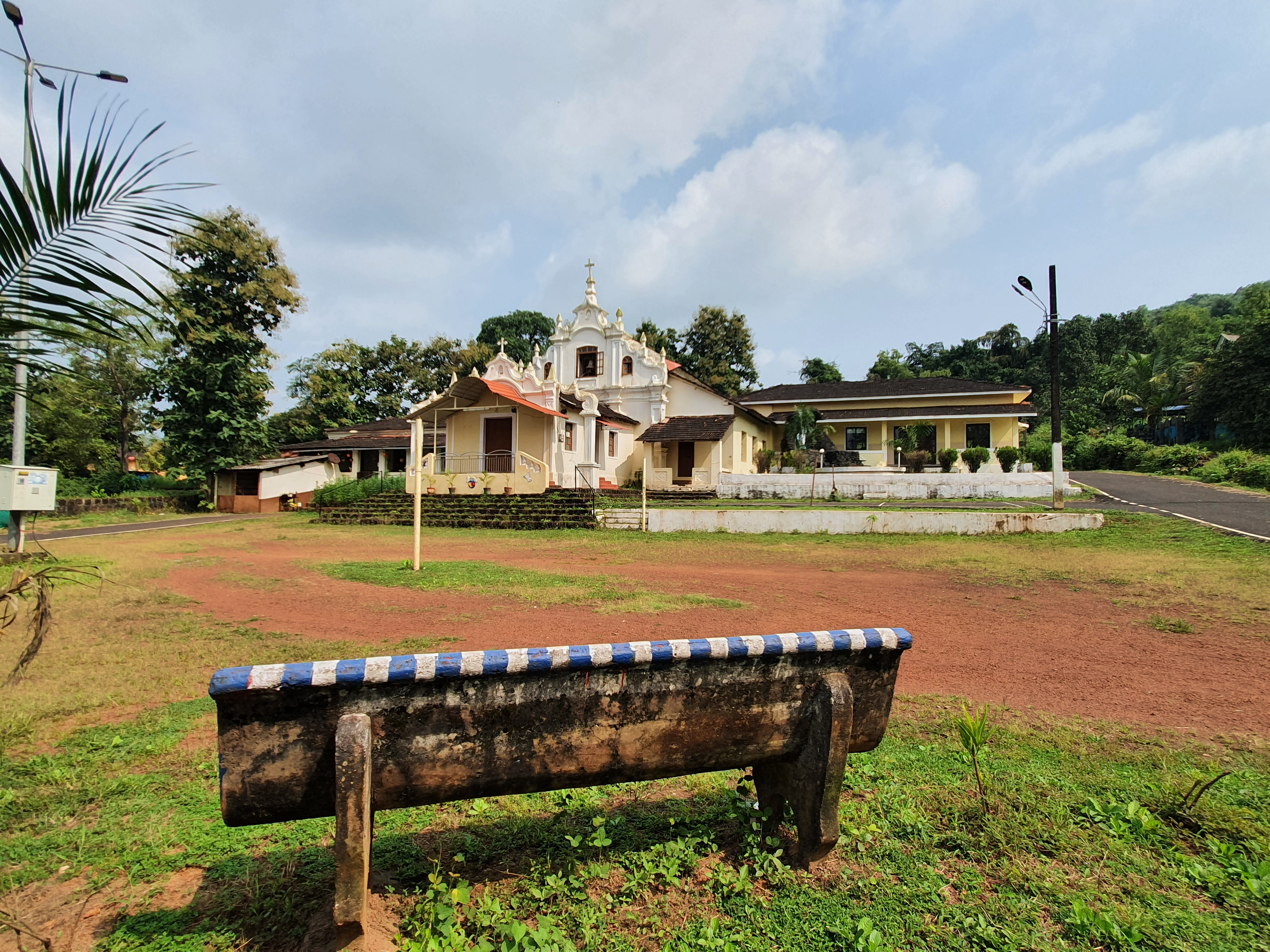
Chapels of Raia

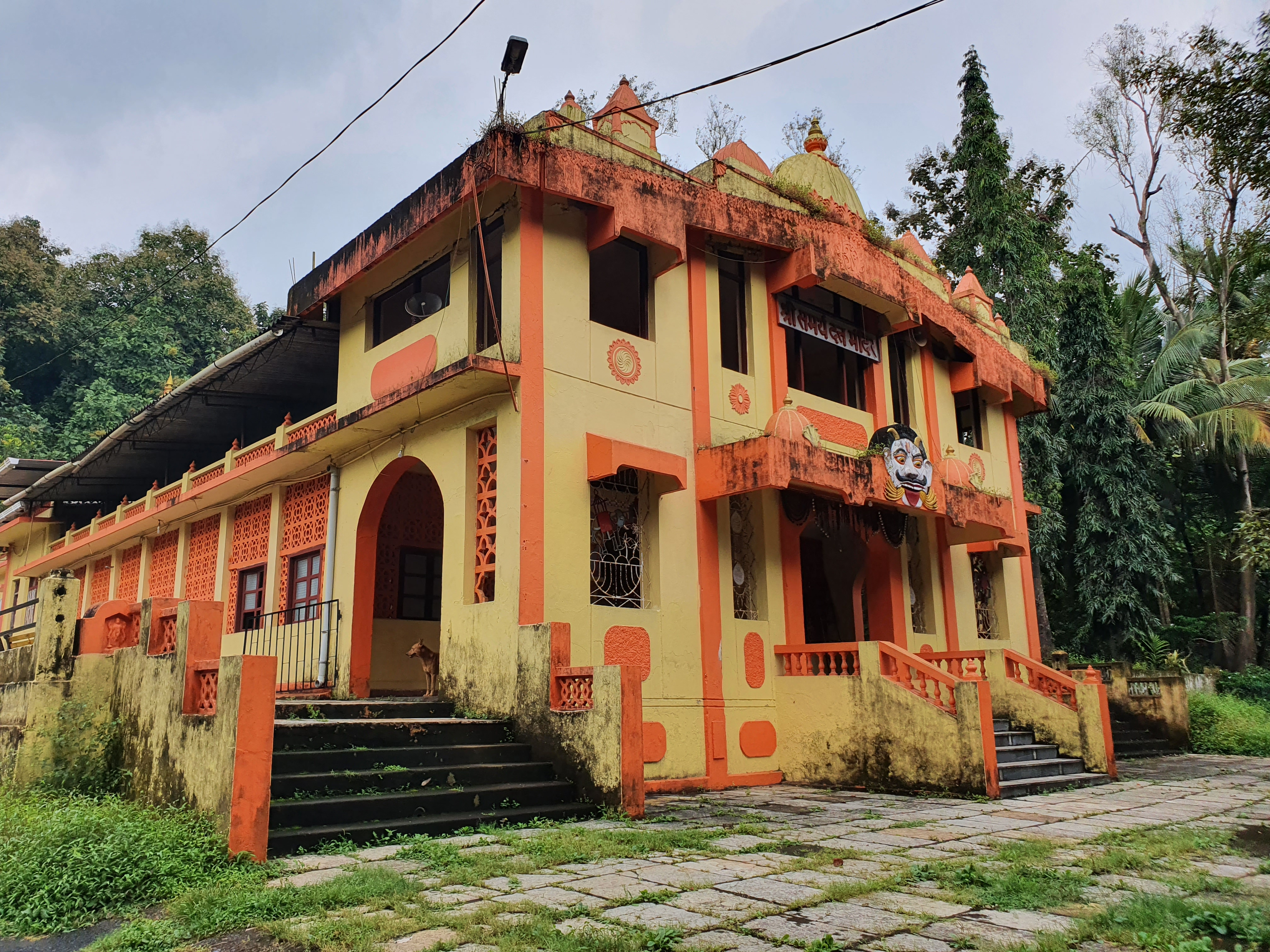
Temple in the village

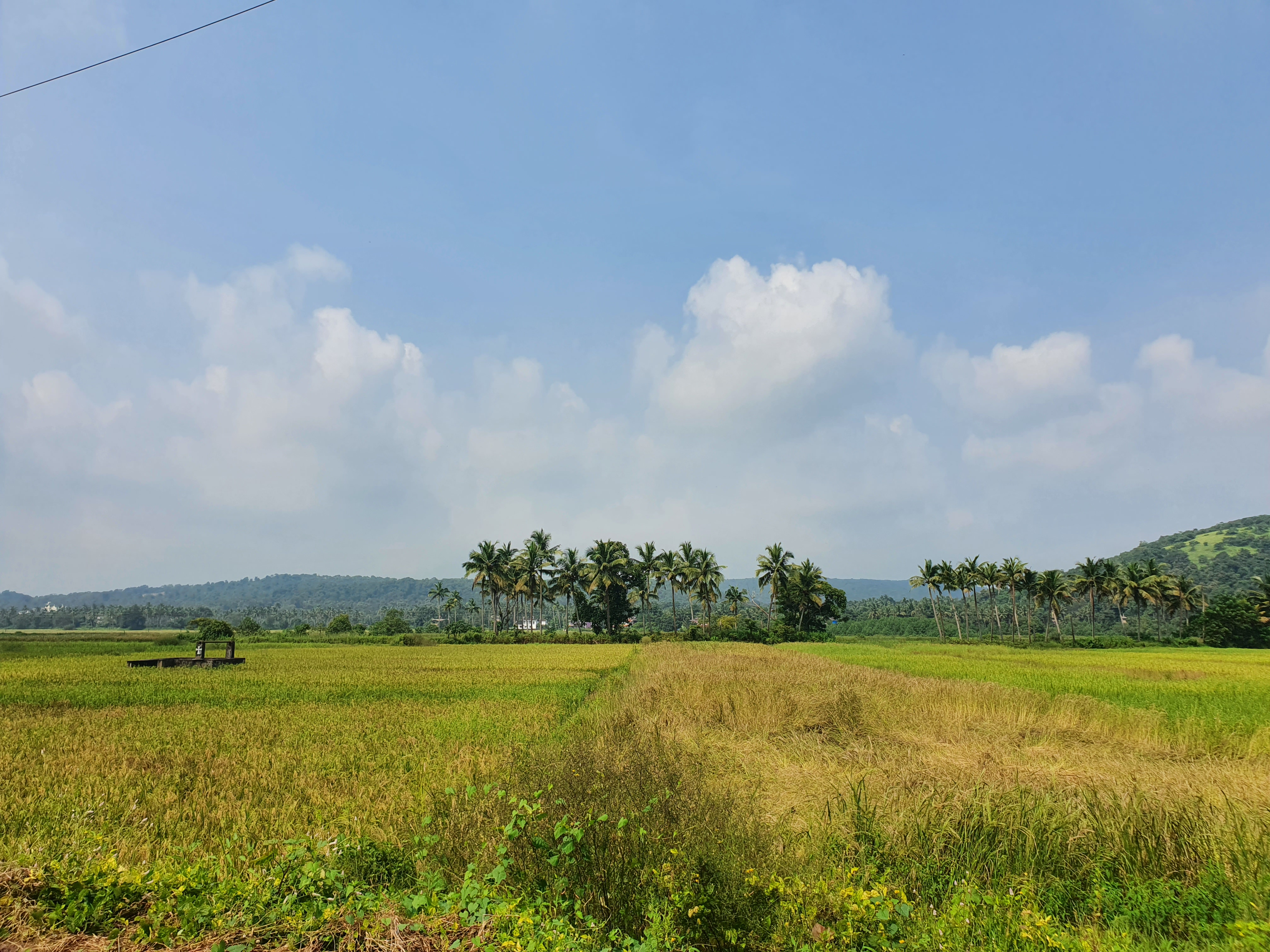
Raia view

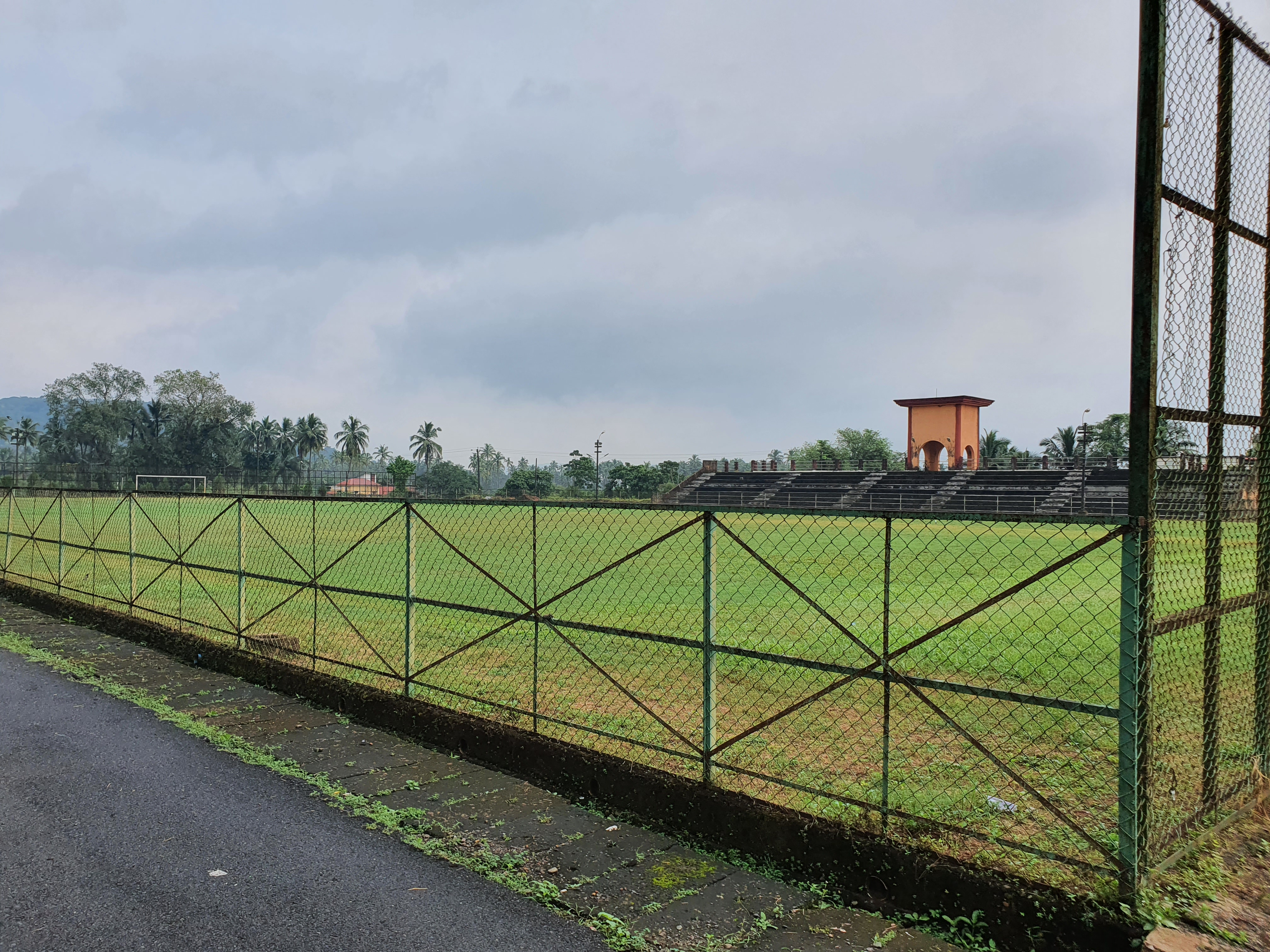
View from Raia

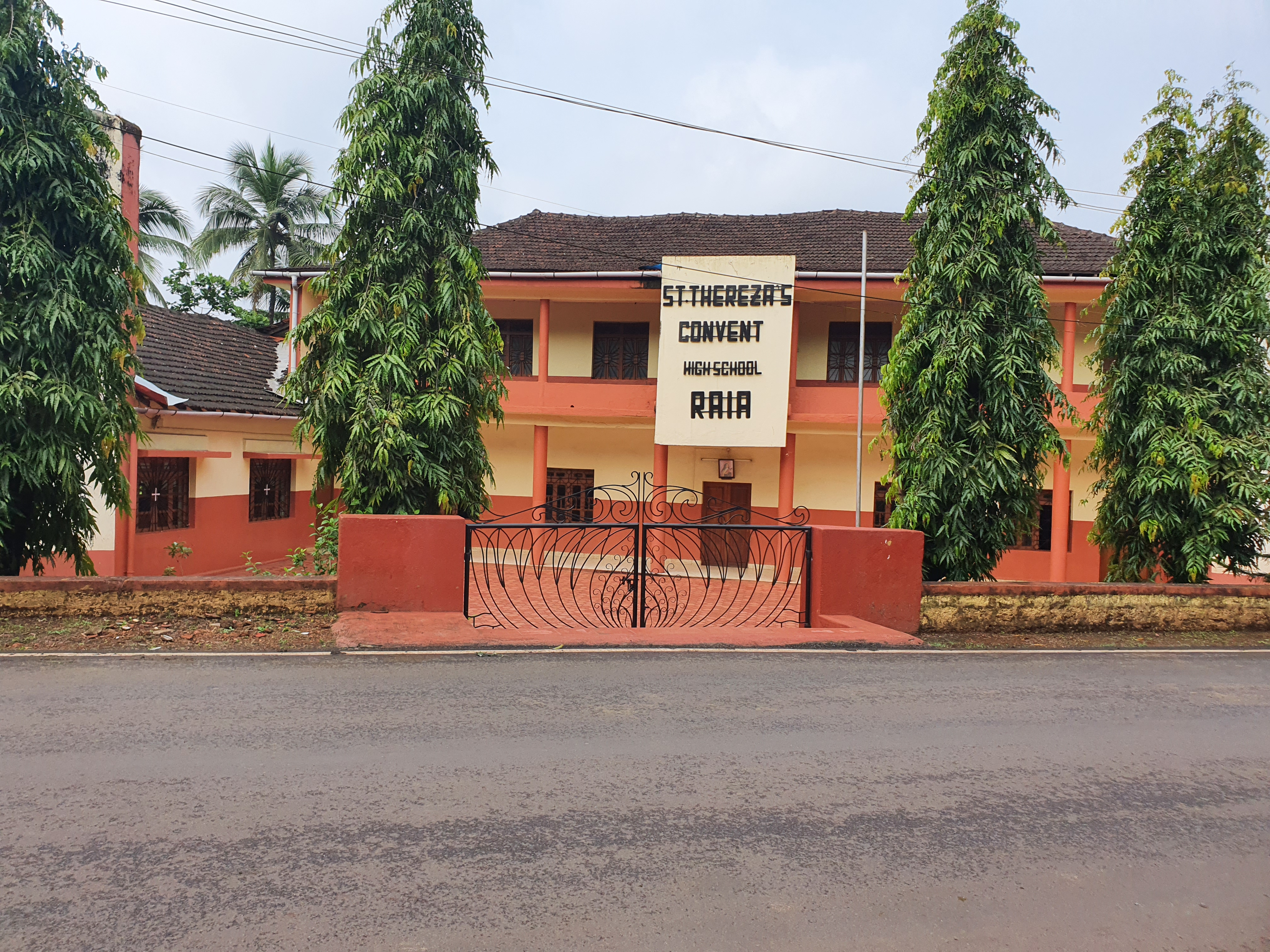
Convent in the area

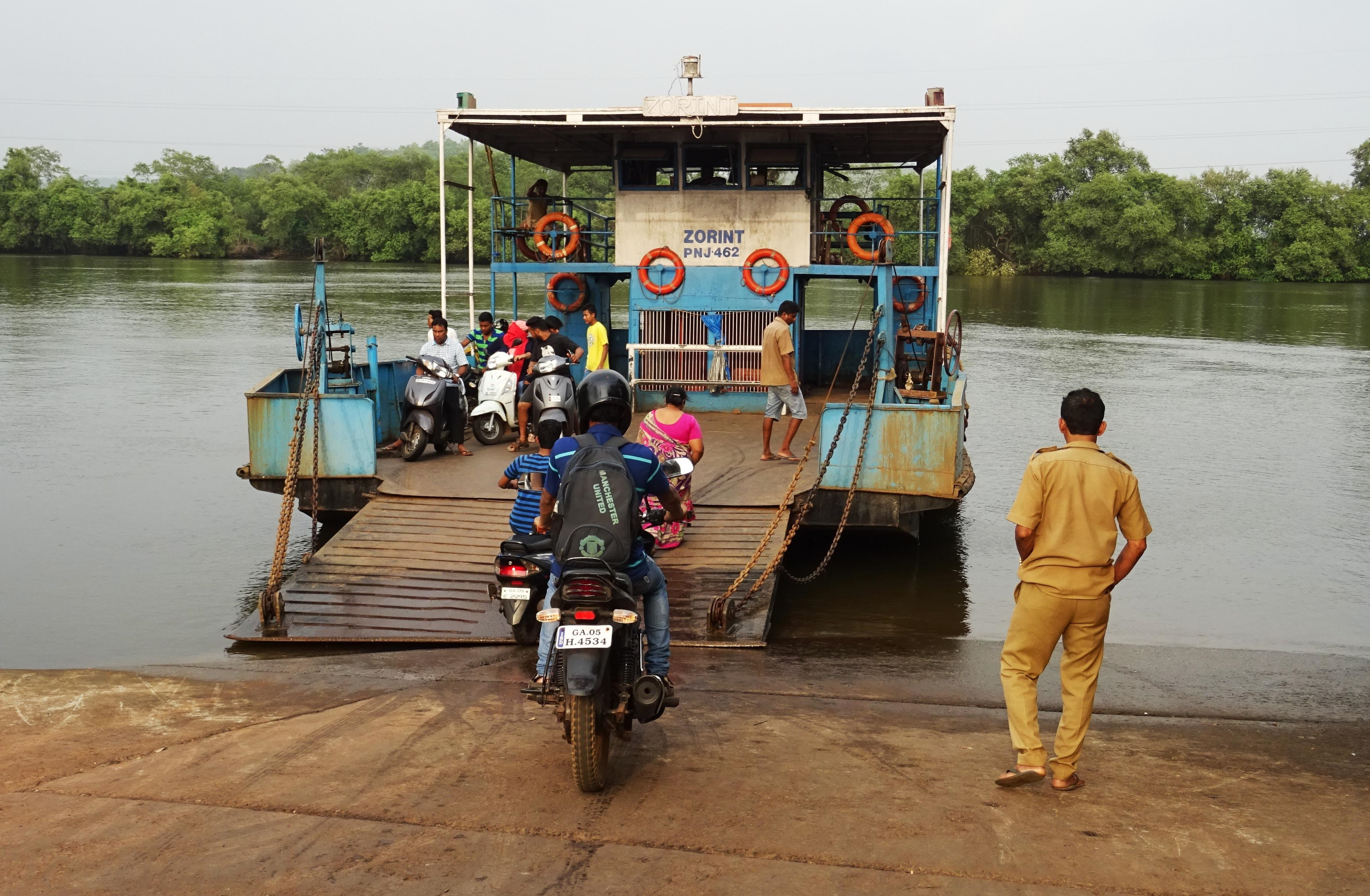
Raia-Rachol ferry

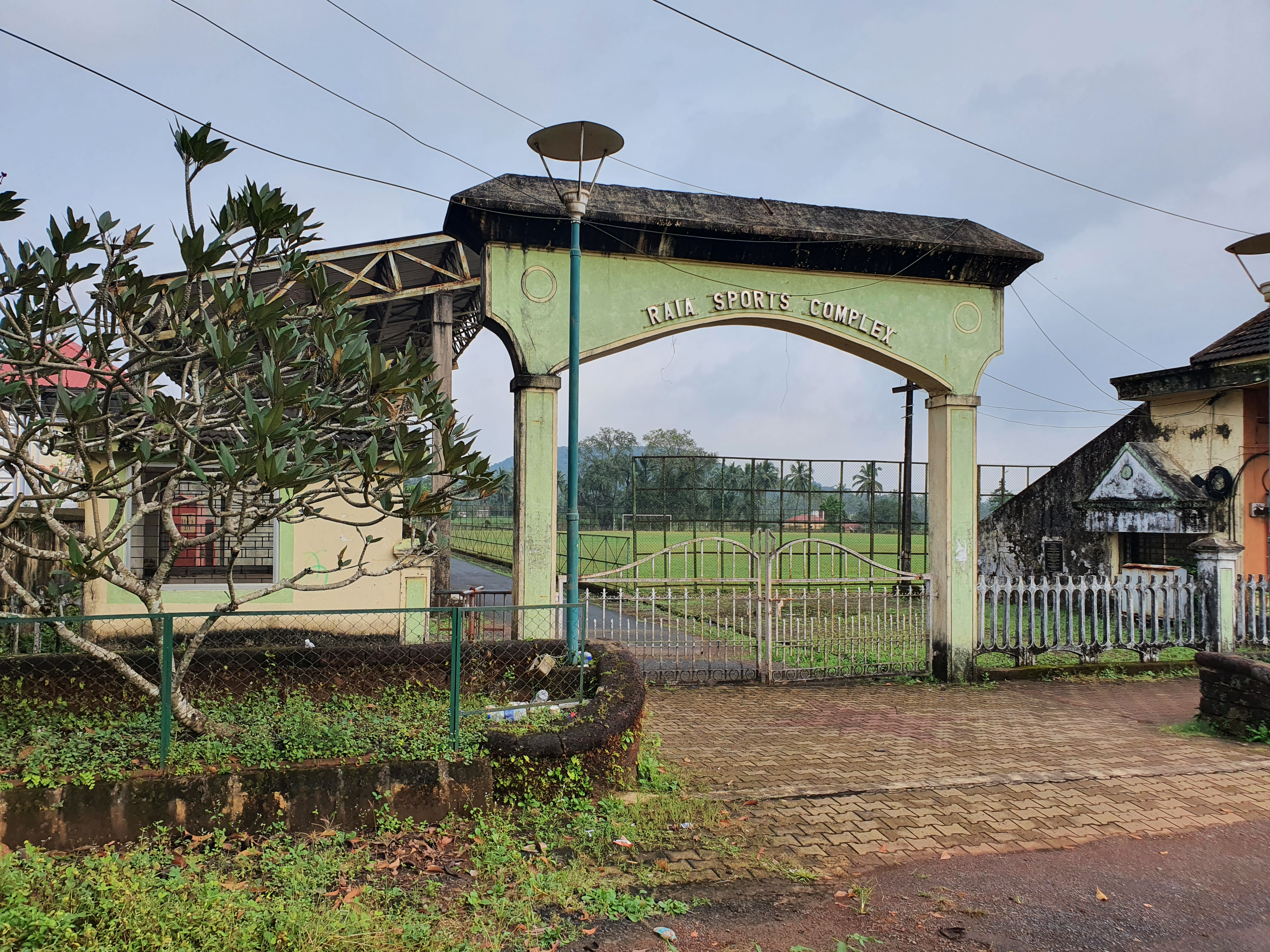
Raia Sports Complex

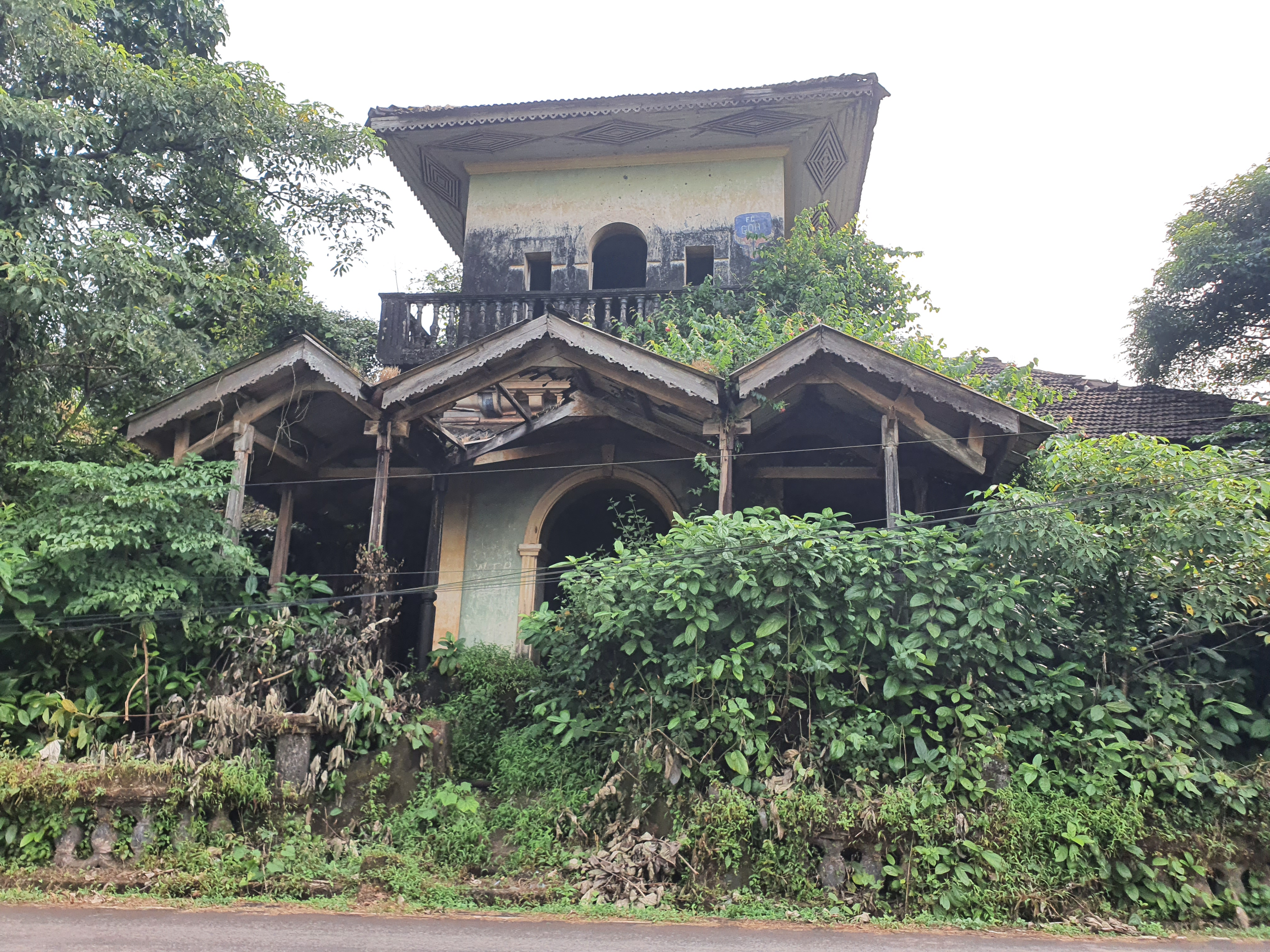
Old local homes

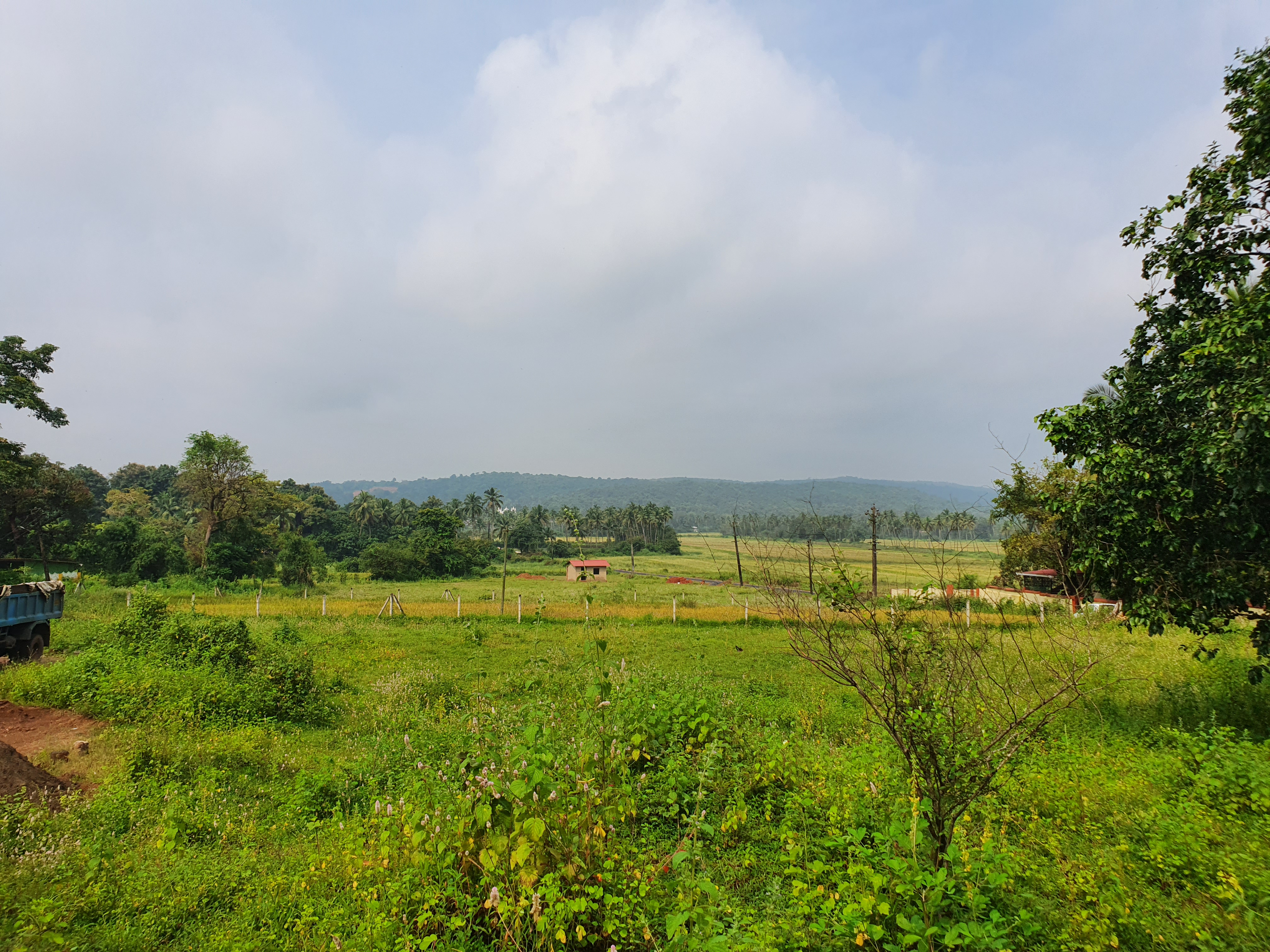
Green fields

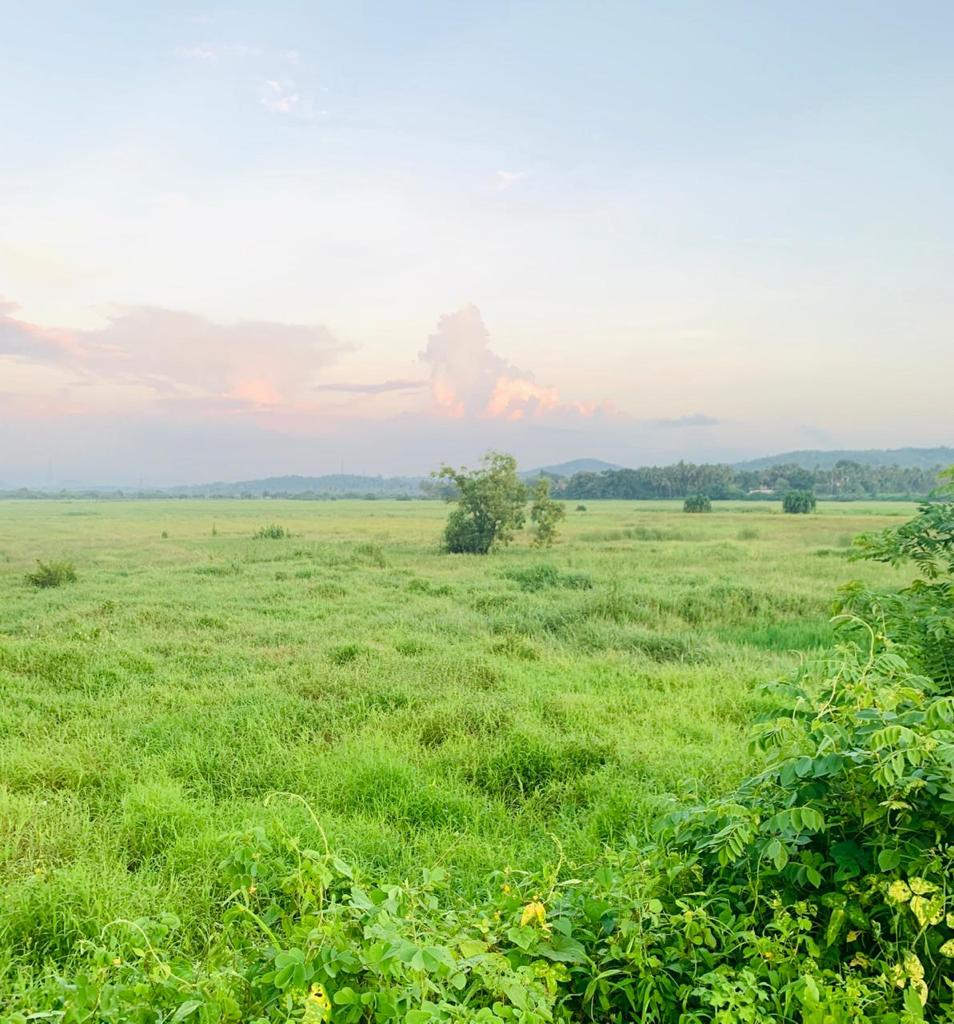
In the village

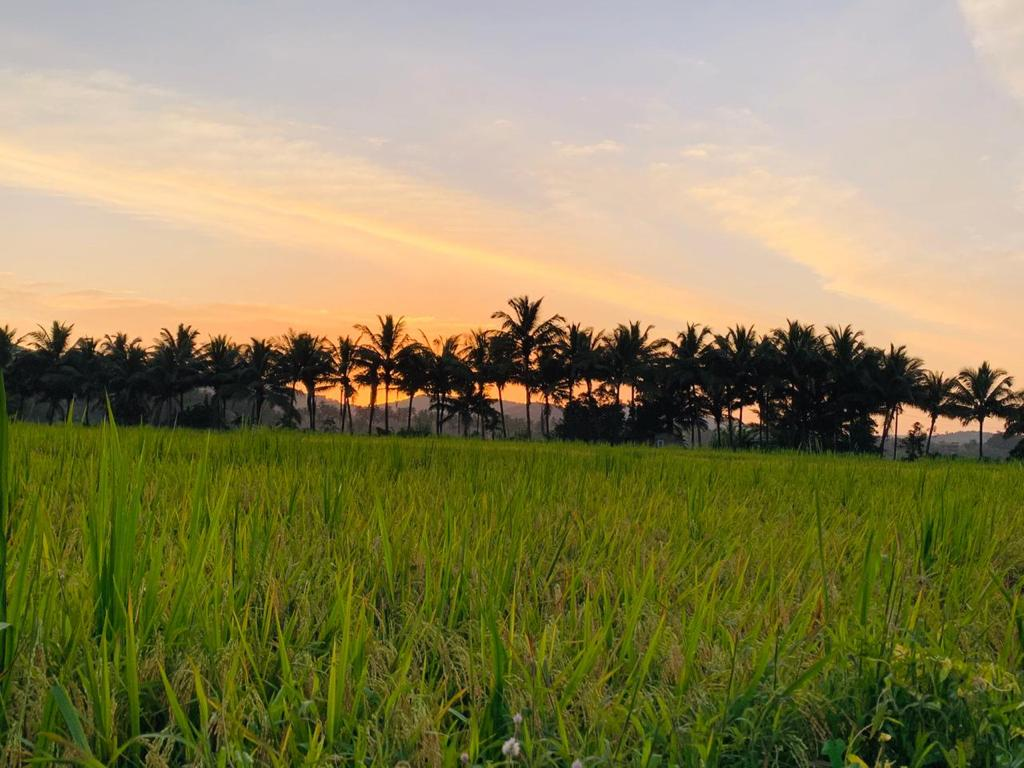
Around the village

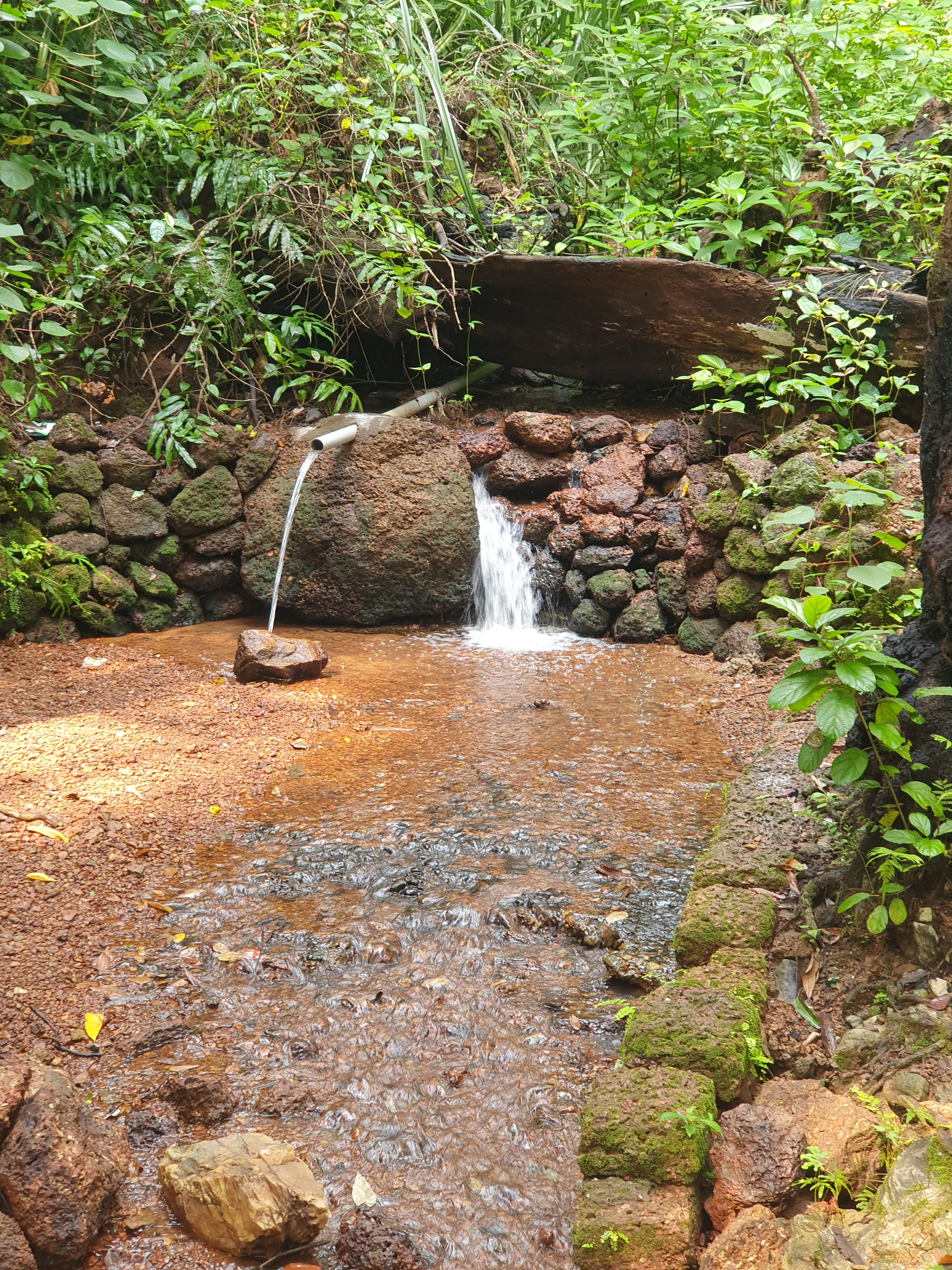
Spring at Curra, Raia

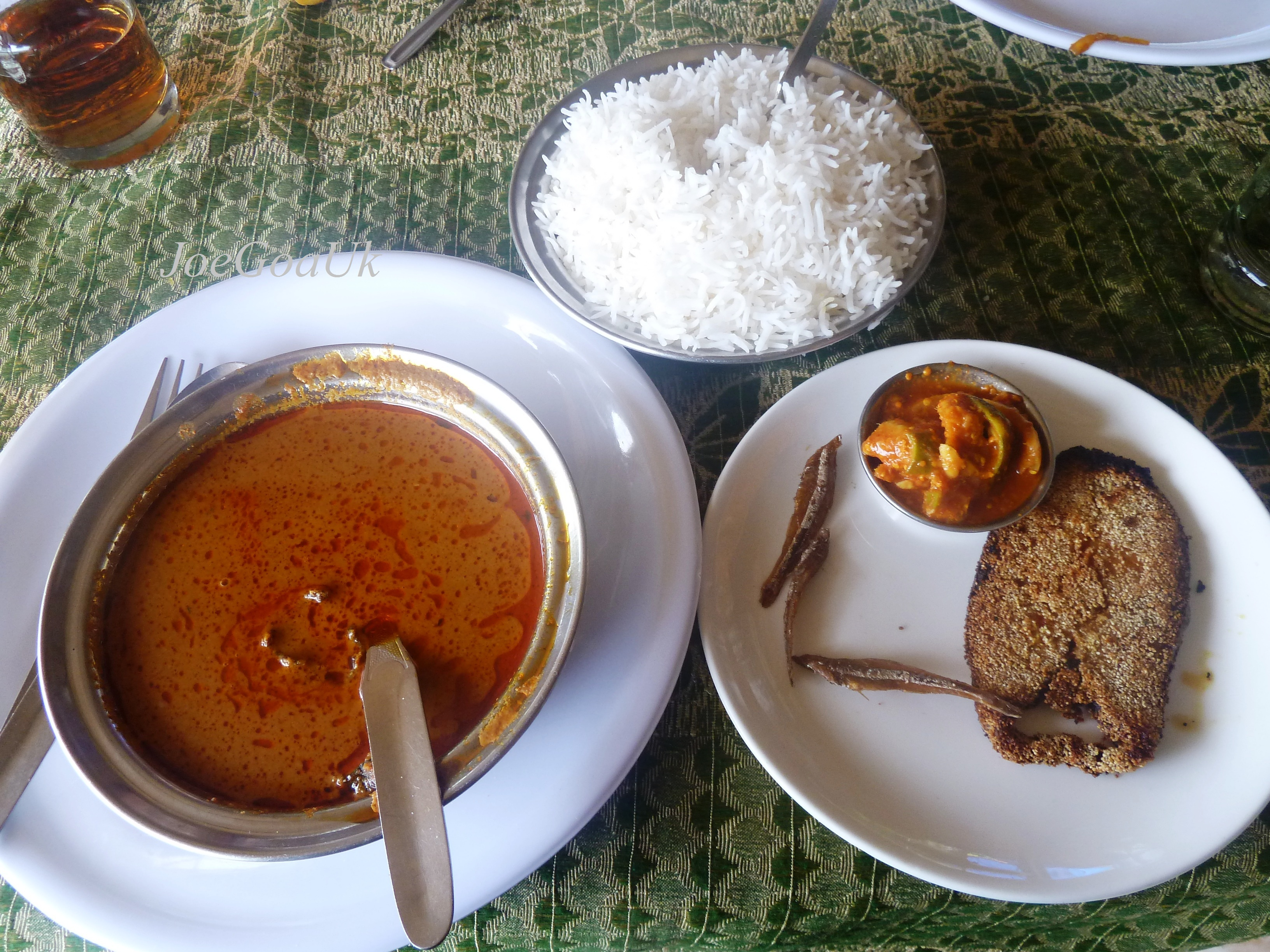
Fish-curry-rice from the village

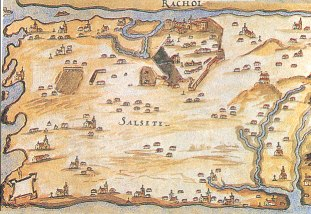
Centuries-old map of the area including nearby Rachol
Images from Raia, Goa, India
