= Laxmi Prasad SC =

Indian football club

Laxmi Prasad S.C.
- Full name: Tuff Laxmi Prasad Sports Club
- Founded: 1960; 66 years ago
- Ground: Duler Stadium, Goa
- Capacity: 8,000
- Manager: Mohan Satoskar
- Coach: Valentino Eziko

Tuff Laxmi Prasad Sports Club, known simply as Laxmi Prasad SC, is an Indian professional football club based in Mapusa, Goa. The club currently competes in the Goa Professional League and participated in the Durand Cup.

== History ==
First, in 2012, the team made a leap from the Goa second division to the Goa first division and now from first they are promoted to the competitive Goa Professional League. Laxmi Prasad have remained unbeaten throughout the two-season spell.

At one time, Laxmi Prasad were regarded as a team that was satisfied with the second division tag. The club has been in the second division league for a major portion of their 36 years of existence. Laxmi Prasad featured in the Professional League several years back when the league was still called senior division league. Laxmi Prasad SC won Bangalore championship 2020.

== Honours ==
=== Cup ===
- Goa Police Cup
  - Champions (1): 2015

== See also ==
- List of football clubs in Goa
