= 2013–14 Bengaluru FC season =

1st season in existence of Bengaluru FC

Bengaluru FC
2013–14 season
- Bengaluru Football Stadium served as home for the club in the 2013–14 season.
- Chairman: Parth Jindal
- Head coach: Ashley Westwood
- Ground: Bangalore Football Stadium
- I-League: 1st
- Federation Cup: Group
- Top goalscorer: League: Sunil Chhetri (14); All: Sunil Chhetri (15)
- Highest home attendance: 8,347 vs Pune (28 March 2014)
- Average home league attendance: 7,038
Home colours	Away colours	Third colours

The 2013–14 Bengaluru FC season was the club's inaugural season in I-League, the top flight of Indian football, and the first season in the club's entire history.

Bengaluru FC's season began in September 2013 with a game against Mohun Bagan. On 21 April 2014, Bengaluru FC won their first ever I-League title by defeating Dempo 2–4 at Fatorda Stadium, with one game remaining. Bengaluru FC created the history by being in the first team to win I-League title in its debut season. Sunil Chhetri was the joint top-scorer in the league with 14 goals.

In domestic cups, Bengaluru FC competed in the Federation Cup, but could not advance beyond the group stage.

== Background ==
On 15 May 2013 it was announced that the All India Football Federation had officially received three bids for two direct-entry spots into the I-League. The bids came from the JSW Group, Dodsal Group, and a consortium from Kerala.

Finally, on 28 May 2013, it was officially announced that JSW Group had won the franchise rights to the direct-club in Bangalore and that it would be spearheaded by the companies sports branch, JSW Sports. The team would play all home games in Bangalore while setting up a youth academy there. They would also try to make better football infrastructure for the city. Then on 21 July 2013, almost two months after winning the bid for a team, JSW launched the team officially as Bengaluru Football Club by throwing a mega-electric event at the Bangalore Football Stadium, which would be announced as the home for Bengaluru FC during the season. Along with the club name and stadium, the club crest and colours were also unveiled as well as the team's home kit for the season and the squad.

== Pre–season ==
=== Signings ===
In preparation for their first season Bengaluru started to make flurry of signings which included midfielder Thoi Singh, goalkeeper Bruno Colaço, and midfielders Keegan Pereira, Gurtej Singh, and local player Shankar Sampingiraj. Then on 2 July 2013 it was announced that Bengaluru had signed their first ever head coach in former Manchester United youth player and former Blackburn Rovers assistant manager Ashley Westwood.

On 16 July 2013 it was announced that Bengaluru had signed their first two foreigners in their history when they signed former Premier League and Middlesbrough defender John Johnson and former Football League Two and AFC Wimbledon defender Curtis Osano for the season. The club then continued their signing spree when they signed former Liberia captain and former USL First Division midfielder Johnny Menyongar. The club then signed completed a double swoop when they signed current India international forwards Robin Singh and current national captain Sunil Chhetri for the season.

Then, once the club was officially launched, the following players were unveiled by the club: goalkeepers Pawan Kumar and Ricardo Cardozo, defenders Vishal Kumar, Lalrozama Fanai, Rino Anto, and Don Bosco Andrew, midfielders Malemngamba Meetei, Darren Caldeira, and Sampath Kuttymani, and forward Karan Sawhney. The next month, in August, Bengaluru confirmed their fourth and final foreign signing of the pre–season when they signed Australian and former A-League forward Sean Rooney.

On 12 September 2013 it was announced that Bengaluru FC had added two more players to their squad in midfielders Niroshan Mani and Amoes. Both players are local players from Karnataka. Then, right before the season began, it was confirmed that the club had signed on former India international Nanjangud Shivananju Manju, as well as Beikhokhei Beingaichho and Manpreet Singh for the season.

==== In season signings ====
On 13 December 2013 it was announced that Bengaluru FC would bring in three players on loan from IMG-Reliance for the rest of the season. The players were Soram Anganba, Randhan Meitei, and Shankar Sampingiraj. Then, on 30 January 2014, it was confirmed that Bengaluru FC had signed C.K. Vineeth from fellow I-League side United S.C. on a deal that would last the remainder of the season.

=== Matches ===
The club then played their first friendly of the season against the India national football team on 25 August 2013 in their preparation for the 2013 SAFF Championship in which Bengaluru drew the match 1–1 with Johnny Menyongar scoring the first goal of the match before India equalized through Lenny Rodrigues. The club then played their second match of pre–season against MEG Bangalore at the Bangalore Football Stadium on 31 August 2013 in which Bengaluru FC won the match 8–2 with former India international Nanjangud Shivananju Manju being a part of the scoring for Bengaluru FC.

==== Results ====
25 August 2013	Bengaluru FC (India)	1–1	India	Bangalore, Karnataka
	Menyongar	Report	Rodrigues	Stadium: Bangalore Football Stadium; Attendance: 0

31 August 2013	Bengaluru FC (India)	8–2	(India) MEG	Bangalore, Karnataka
	Manju; Amoes; Andrew; Sawhney	Report; Report		Stadium: Bangalore Football Stadium

== Competitions ==
=== Overall ===
Competition	Started round	Final position	First match	Last match
Federation Cup	Group stage	Group stage	15 January 2014	21 January 2014
I-League	—	Winners	22 September 2013	28 April 2014

Last Updated: 28 April 2014
Source : Competitions

=== Overview ===
Competition	Record							
Competition	Pld	W	D	L	GF	GA	GD	Win %
Federation Cup	3	1	1	1	6	6	+0	33.33
I-League	24	14	5	5	42	28	+14	58.33
Total	27	15	6	6	48	34	+14	55.56

Last updated: 28 April 2014
Source: Competitions

=== I-League ===
==== Summary ====
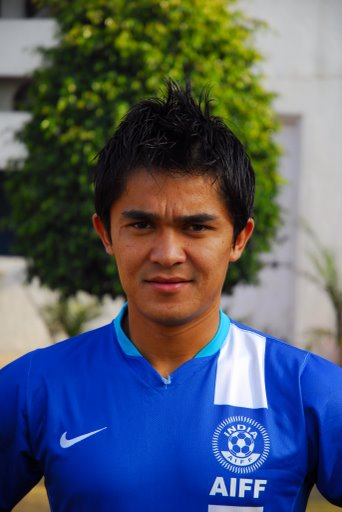
Sunil Chhetri was the season's leading scorer for Bengaluru FC with 15 goals, including 14 in the league.

Bengaluru played their first ever official match in the I-League on 22 September 2013 against Mohun Bagan A.C. at the Bangalore Football Stadium. After a scoreless first-half Bengaluru scored their first ever official goal in the 49th minute to take the lead through Sean Rooney. However, in injury-time, Mohun Bagan managed to draw a goal back through Chinadorai Sabeeth and thus the match ended in a 1–1 stalemate. The club then won their first ever match in the I-League in their very next match against Rangdajied United F.C. at the Bangalore Football Stadium on 29 September 2013 in which goals from John Johnson, Sean Rooney, and Sunil Chhetri saw the team win the match 3–0 in front of their home fans.

The club then entered the month of October with their second victory in a row against United S.C. on 6 October 2013 at the Bangalore Football Stadium in which an early 4th-minute goal from John Johnson saw Bengaluru come out as the 1–0 winners. Then only four days later, the club won its third game in a row against Mohammedan S.C. at the Bangalore Football Stadium in which goals from John Johnson and Sean Rooney were enough to secure a 2–1 victory. The streak was then extended to four games on 23 October when Bengaluru FC won 3–1 over Dempo S.C. at the Bangalore Football Stadium in which goals from Siam Hanghal and Sean Rooney were enough for Bengaluru to finish off their five-game home-stand end in style. However, that is where the streak would end as Bengaluru lost their next match, which also happened to be their first away match of the season, against East Bengal F.C. at the Kalyani Stadium in Kalyani, West Bengal in which an own goal by Robin Singh and a goal from James Moga led to the loss.

The club then opened the month of November with their second away match of the season against Mumbai F.C. at the Balewadi Sports Complex in Pune, Maharashtra on 2 November 2013. The match ended in a 2–2 draw for Bengaluru with Sean Rooney and Sunil Chhetri scoring for Bengaluru and Hashmatullah Barakzai and Climax Lawrence scoring for Mumbai. Four days later, the club played their second match at the Balewadi Sports Complex but this time against Pune. The match ended 1–0 to Pune with James Meyer scoring for the hosts. Then, after a two-week international break, Bengaluru FC returned home to face Sporting Goa on 23 November. Despote holding the majority of possession Bengaluru FC succumbed to a 0–0 draw. Then in the final match of the month, Bengaluru FC went back on the road to face Salgaocar F.C. at the Duler Stadium in a top of the table battle. A goal each from Johnny Menyongar and Beikhokhei Beingaichho helped Bengaluru FC earn a 2–1 victory which not only was their first victory away from home this season but also their first away victory ever. The win also took the club to 2nd in the table on goal-difference.

The month of the December started early for Bengaluru FC as the club took on Shillong Lajong on 1 December 2013 at the Bangalore Football Stadium. Bengaluru FC eventually came out as the victors in the match after two early goals from captain Sunil Chhetri in the 7th and 34th minute (from a penalty) sealed a 2–1 win for the team. The victory pushed Bengaluru FC to the top of the I-League table to begin the month. Their second match of the month came away from home at the Duler Stadium. Bengaluru FC took on the reigning champions from last season, Churchill Brothers. Bengaluru FC took an early second half lead of 2–0 thanks to strikes from Sean Rooney and Sunil Chhetri. Churchill Brothers brought a goal back with a strike from Balwant Singh before Chhetri sealed the match for Bengaluru FC by scoring his second goal of the match as Bengaluru FC won 3–1. The team then continued their away form in Kolkata on 11 December 2013 when they defeated Mohammedan at the Salt Lake Stadium by a score of 3–2. After taking an early 21st-minute lead through Johnny Menyongar it was Josimar who scored the equalizer for Mohammedan in first-half stoppage time. Sunil Chhetri then restored the lead for Bengaluru FC in the 48th minute before Josimar once again equalized for Mohammedan in the 57th minute but in the 71st minute it was Sunil Chhetri who scored his second goal of the match and the eventual winner for the Bangalore side. However, the club then slipped to their third loss of the season in their next match against East Bengal - thus their second loss to East Bengal this season - at the Bangalore Football Stadium on 15 December 2013. Both goals for East Bengal were scored by James Moga and Chidi Edeh. It was in this match that Bengaluru FC managed to draw 8,216 fans into the Bangalore Football Stadium, the most the team has had till that point. Despite the loss though, Bengaluru FC still managed to end the month of December and the year 2013 with a victory on 21 December 2013 against Salgaocar at the Bangalore Football Stadium in which penalty goals from Sunil Chhetri and Robin Singh (his first of the season) sealed a 2–1 win for the team.

Bengaluru FC resumed their campaign in the second phase by playing Mumbai at home. Having received four yellow cards in the season, the captain Sunil Chhetri was suspended in the game and Rino Anto led the team. After goalless first half, Bengaluru were trailing 0–1 after Ebi Sukore scored for Mumbai in 47th minute. Robin Singh equalized in 55th minute and salvaged draw for Bengaluru. In round 19, the battle between top and bottom of the table, Bengaluru FC played away game against Rangdajied United F.C. After trailing 0–2 in the first half, Bengaluru equalized at 2–2 after quick goals by Chhetri and Rooney in 60th and 61st minutes, but after Ranti Martins' goal in 76th minutes, the match ended as a loss for Bengaluru. Bengaluru FC returned to form in the penultimate home game, when they defeated defending champions Churchill Brothers 3–0, courtesy three second half goals, two by Sunil Chhetri and one by Robin Singh. Bengaluru FC opened up 7 points lead at the top of table when they defeated United S.C. 1–3 in the away game. In the next game, Bengaluru FC could not score a goal and ended up losing 3–0 to Shillong Lajong. Two Bengaluru players Pawan Kumar and Curtis Osano were handed red cards in closing minutes and as a result, would miss the next game. In the last home game, Bengaluru FC played another title contender Pune FC. Bengaluru FC took the lead in 25th minute by a goal from Thoi Singh, but Pune FC equalized in the second half in 73rd minute and the game ended in 1–1. This match broke the highest attendance record at Bangalore Football Stadium with 8,347 people attending the game. With other title contenders, Salgaocar and East Bengal closing-in, Bengaluru FC desperately needed a comfortable margin at the top. In their next away game against Mohun Bagan, Thoi Singh and Sean Rooney scored a goal each in each half and secured 0–2 victory and 4 points lead at the top of the table. During the game, coach Ashley Westwood was sent off from the technical area for showing continuous dissent. With East Bengal closing in on Bengaluru FC, the team needed a win in the game against Dempo in the next game to ensure the title. Bengaluru FC lead 0–1 at the end of the first half as Sean Rooney scored early in the 2nd minute. They consolidated their lead as Robin Singh and Johnny Menyongar scored a goal each. Dempo threatened with two quick goals in the closing minutes, but Sunil Chhetri's goal, 4 minutes into the additional time ensured 2–4 victory for Bengaluru FC. Bengaluru FC created the history by being the first team to win I-League in its debut year. Bengaluru FC ended their campaign on the winning note when they won their final league game 1–2 against Sporting Clube de Goa due to goals from Robin Singh and Beikhokhei Beingaichho in the second half.

==== Matches ====
22 September 2013 1	Bengaluru FC	1–1	Mohun Bagan	Bangalore, Karnataka
16:00 IST	Rooney 49'	Report	Sabeeth 90+1'	Stadium: Bangalore Football Stadium; Referee: Rahul Dsa

29 September 2013 2	Bengaluru FC	3–0	Rangdajied United	Bangalore, Karnataka
16:00 IST	Johnson 33'; Rooney 57'; Chhetri 67'	Report		Stadium: Bangalore Football Stadium; Referee: Anthony Simoes

6 October 2013 3	Bengaluru FC	1–0	United	Bangalore, Karnataka
16:00 IST	Johnson 4'	Report		Stadium: Bangalore Football Stadium; Attendance: 7,328; Referee: Vishnu Chauhan

10 October 2013 4	Bengaluru FC	2–1	Mohammedan	Bangalore, Karnataka
16:00 IST	Johnson 12'; Rooney 28'	Report	Josimar 78'	Stadium: Bangalore Football Stadium; Attendance: 5,350; Referee: Rahul Dsa

23 October 2013 5	Bengaluru FC	3–1	Dempo	Bangalore, Karnataka
16:00 IST	Hanghal 6'; Rooney 11', 61'	Report	Miranda 63'	Stadium: Bangalore Football Stadium; Attendance: 6,352; Referee: Pranjal Banerjee

26 October 2013 6	East Bengal	2–0	Bengaluru FC	Kalyani, West Bengal
14:30 IST	Singh 49' (o.g.); Moga 90+4'	Report		Stadium: Kalyani Stadium; Referee: Rahul Dsa

2 November 2013 7	Mumbai	2–2	Bengaluru FC	Pune, Maharashtra
15:30 IST	Barakzai 10'; Lawrence 90+4'	Report	Rooney 8'; Chhetri 58' (pen.)	Stadium: Balewadi Sports Complex; Referee: Pranjal Banerjee

6 November 2013 8	Pune	1–0	Bengaluru FC	Pune, Maharashtra
19:00 IST	Meyer 71'	Report		Stadium: Balewadi Sports Complex; Referee: Ajit Dutta

23 November 2013 9	Bengaluru FC	0–0	Sporting Goa	Bangalore, Karnataka
14:30 IST		Report		Stadium: Bangalore Football Stadium; Attendance: 6,104; Referee: Prabir Dhar

26 November 2013 10	Salgaocar	1–2	Bengaluru FC	Mapusa, Goa
15:30 IST	Oliveira 23'	Report	Menyongar 21'; Beingaichho 57'	Stadium: Duler Stadium; Referee: Rahul Dsa

1 December 2013 11	Bengaluru FC	2–1	Shillong Lajong	Bangalore, Karnataka
15:00 IST	Chhetri 7', 34' (pen.)	Report	Haokip 82'	Stadium: Bangalore Football Stadium; Attendance: 7,254; Referee: Pranjal Banerjee

6 December 2013 12	Churchill Brothers	1–3	Bengaluru FC	Mapusa, Goa
15:30 IST	Singh 74'	Report	Rooney 50'; Chhetri 64', 77'	Stadium: Duler Stadium; Referee: C.R. Srikrishna

11 December 2013 13	Mohammedan	2–3	Bengaluru FC	Kolkata, West Bengal
15:30 IST	Josimar 45+2', 57'	Report	Menyongar 21'; Chhetri 48', 71'	Stadium: Salt Lake Stadium; Referee: Ratheesh Kumar

15 December 2013 14	Bengaluru FC	0–2	East Bengal	Bangalore, Karnataka
15:00 IST		Report	Moga 17'; Edeh 81'	Stadium: Bangalore Football Stadium; Attendance: 8,216; Referee: Anthony Simoes

21 December 2013 15	Bengaluru FC	2–1	Salgaocar	Bangalore, Karnataka
15:00 IST	Chhetri 29'; Singh 90+3'	Report	Oliveira 85'	Stadium: Bangalore Football Stadium; Attendance: 7,700; Referee: Rowan Arumughan

22 February 2014 16	Bengaluru FC	1–1	Mumbai	Bangalore, Karnataka
16:00 IST	Singh 55'	Report	Sukore 47'	Stadium: Bangalore Football Stadium; Attendance: 7,162; Referee: Prabir Dhar

1 March 2014 17	Rangdajied United	3–2	Bengaluru FC	Shillong, Meghalaya
16:00 IST	Dias 15'; Lalnunpuia 31'; Martins 76'	Report	Chhetri 60'; Rooney 61'	Stadium: Jawaharlal Nehru Stadium; Referee: Pranjal Banerjee

8 March 2014 18	Bengaluru FC	3–0	Churchill Brothers	Bangalore, Karnataka
16:00 IST	Chhetri 56', 90'; Singh 61'	Report		Stadium: Bangalore Football Stadium; Attendance: 6,912; Referee: M. Santosh Kumar

13 March 2014 19	United	1–3	Bengaluru FC	Kalyani, West Bengal
14:30 IST	Brown 54' (pen.)	Report	T. Singh 44'; Singh 61' (o.g.); Chhetri 89'	Stadium: Kalyani Stadium; Referee: R. Saha

23 March 2014 20	Shillong Lajong	3–0	Bengaluru FC	Shillong, Meghalaya
17:00 IST	Uilliams 46'; Glen 80', 90+4' (pen.)	Report		Stadium: Jawaharlal Nehru Stadium; Referee: T. Nagvenkar

28 March 2014 21	Bengaluru FC	1–1	Pune	Bangalore, Karnataka
16:00 IST	T. Singh 25'	Report	D'Souza 73'	Stadium: Bangalore Football Stadium; Attendance: 8,347; Referee: Rowan Arumughan

6 April 2014 22	Mohun Bagan	0–2	Bengaluru FC	Kolkata, West Bengal
16:00 IST		Report	T. Singh 45+1'; Rooney 60'	Stadium: Salt Lake Stadium; Referee: Rahul Dsa

21 April 2014 23	Dempo	2–4	Bengaluru FC	Margao, Goa
17:30 IST	Silva 82'; Fernandes 89'	Report	Rooney 2'; Singh 56'; Menyongar 79'; Chhetri 90+7'	Stadium: Fatorda Stadium; Referee: C.R. Srikrishna

28 April 2014 24	Sporting Goa	1–2	Bengaluru FC	Margao, Goa
17:30 IST	Karpeh 41'	Report	Singh 59'; Beingaichho 90+2'	Stadium: Fatorda Stadium; Referee: C.R. Srikrishna

==== Table ====
Pos	Team	Pld	W	D	L	GF	GA	GD	Pts	Qualification or relegation
1	Bengaluru (C)	24	14	5	5	42	28	+14	47	Qualification for 2015 AFC Champions League qualifying play-off
2	East Bengal	24	12	7	5	39	23	+16	43	Qualification for 2015 AFC Cup group stage
3	Salgaocar	24	11	6	7	36	25	+11	39	
4	Dempo	24	9	8	7	31	25	+6	35	
5	Sporting Goa	24	9	7	8	34	34	0	34	

Source: IndiaFooty.com
Rules for classification: 1) points; 2) head-to-head points; 3) goal difference; 4) number of goals scored; 5) taking lots
(C) Champions

==== Results summary ====
Overall								Home						Away					
Pld	W	D	L	GF	GA	GD	Pts	W	D	L	GF	GA	GD	W	D	L	GF	GA	GD
24	14	5	5	42	28	+14	47	7	4	1	19	9	+10	7	1	4	23	19	+4

Last updated: 28 April 2014.
Source: I-League

==== Results by round ====
Round	1	2	3	4	5	6	7	8	9	10	11	12	13	14	15	16	17	18	19	20	21	22	23	24
Ground	H	H	H	H	H	A	A	A	H	A	H	A	A	H	H	H	A	H	A	A	H	A	A	A
Result	D	W	W	W	W	L	D	L	D	W	W	W	W	L	W	D	L	W	W	L	D	W	W	W

Updated to match(es) played on 28 April 2014. Source: I-League
A = Away; H = Home; W = Win; D = Draw; L = Loss

==== Celebrations ====
Bengaluru FC celebrated the victory organizing a parade with players and fans in the city, where the coach and the captain hailed fans as the important part of their campaign.

=== Federation Cup ===
On 29 August 2013 the groups for the 2013 Indian Federation Cup were announced by the All India Football Federation. Bengaluru FC were placed in Group B along with East Bengal, Rangdajied United, and Sporting Goa.

Bengaluru FC began their Federation Cup campaign on 15 January 2014 against Sporting Goa at the Malappuram District Sports Complex Stadium. The club could not have kicked off their campaign any brighter after they took a 4–0 lead through a double from Beikhokhei Beingaichho and goals from Sunil Chhetri and Robin Singh. Sporting Goa however then managed to pull three back from goals by Boima Karpeh, Beevan D'Mello, and Victorino Fernandes. Bengaluru FC though managed to see out the match by scoring a fifth and final goal from Robin Singh to win the match 5–3. Bengaluru FC then began their second match against Rangdajied United in the best possible way with a 2nd-minute goal from Thoi Singh before Rangdajied United equalized in the 80th minute from Lamine Tamba to end the game 1–1.

The club's campaign in the tournament then finally came to an end three days later when a brace from Chidi Edeh saw Bengaluru FC lose 2–0 to East Bengal, the third time this entire season Bengaluru FC lost to East Bengal 2–0.

==== Table ====
Group B

Team	Pld	W	D	L	GF	GA	GD	Pts
Sporting Goa	3	2	0	1	7	6	+1	6
East Bengal	3	1	1	1	4	3	+1	4
Bengaluru FC	3	1	1	1	6	6	0	4
Rangdajied United	3	0	2	1	2	4	–2	2

15 January 2014 Match 1	Bengaluru FC	5–3	Sporting Goa	Payyanad, Kerala
	Beingaichho 5', 40'; Chhetri 33'; Singh 66', 90+3'	Report	Karpeh 74'; D'Mello 89'; Fernandes 90+1'	Stadium: MDS Complex

18 January 2014 Match 2	Rangdajied United	1–1	Bengaluru FC	Payyanad, Kerala
	Tamba 80'	Report	Singh 2'	Stadium: MDS Complex

21 January 2014 Match 3	East Bengal	2–0	Bengaluru FC	Payyanad, Kerala
	Edeh 62', 75'	Report		Stadium: MDS Complex

== Accolades ==
Bengaluru FC received numerous accolades in the season. Sunil Chhetri was the joint top-scorer in 2013–14 I-League along with Cornell Glen and Daryl Duffy. He also received All India Football Federation's player of the year award. In AIFF's annual awards, Sunil Chhetri was awarded the best player and the best forward of I-League, while John Johnson was awarded the best defender award. Ashley Westwood was named coach of the year by FPAI. Sunil Chhetri was declared AIFF player of the year for 2014.

== Player information ==
=== Squad information ===
No.	Name	Nationality	Position	Date of birth	Previous club
Goalkeepers
1	Pawan Kumar	(India)	GK	1 July 1990 (aged 23)	(India) Salgaocar
22	Bruno Colaço	(India)	GK	11 October 1991 (aged 22)	(India) Sporting Goa
29	Soram Anganba	(India)	GK	24 December 1992 (aged 21)	(India) Pailan Arrows
30	Ricardo Cardozo	(India)	GK	14 January 1993 (aged 21)	(India) Tata Football Academy
Defenders
2	Nanjangud Shivananju Manju	(India)	DF	9 May 1987 (aged 26)	(India) United Sikkim
3	Vishal Kumar	(India)	DF	30 July 1992 (aged 21)	(India) Pailan Arrows
4	Curtis Osano	(England)	CB	8 March 1987 (aged 27)	(England) AFC Wimbledon
6	John Johnson	(England)	CB	16 September 1988 (aged 25)	(England) Northampton Town
13	Rino Anto	(India)	DF	3 January 1988 (aged 26)	(India) Mohun Bagan
20	Keegan Pereira	(India)	DF	7 November 1987 (aged 26)	(India) Salgaocar
23	Lalrozama Fanai	(India)	DF	30 November 1991 (aged 22)	(India) Mohun Bagan
26	Thomas Lalengkima	(India)	DF	22 August 1993 (aged 20)	(India) Aizawl
Midfielders
5	Gurtej Singh	(India)	MF	2 May 1990 (aged 23)	(India) Churchill Brothers
8	Malemngamba Meetei	(India)	MF	5 January 1992 (aged 22)	(India) Salgaocar
10	Johnny Menyongar	(Liberia)	AM	26 June 1980 (aged 33)	(India) Shillong Lajong
12	Thoi Singh	(India)	MF	5 October 1990 (aged 23)	(India) Mumbai Tigers
14	Sampath Kuttymani	(India)	MF	28 September 1986 (aged 27)	(India) Mumbai
15	Darren Caldeira	(India)	MF	19 September 1987 (aged 26)	(India) Mumbai
18	Beikhokhei Beingaichho	(India)	MF	1 December 1992 (aged 21)	(India) East Bengal
19	Siam Hanghal	(India)	MF	26 May 1993 (aged 20)	(India) Pailan Arrows
25	Niroshan Mani	(India)	MF	24 November 1988 (age 37)	(India) Sporting Goa
27	Amoes	(India)	MF	9 April 1994 (aged 20)	(India) South United
28	Don Bosco Andrew	(India)	DF	7 February 1990 (aged 24)	(India) SESA Football Academy
31	C.K. Vineeth	(India)	MF	28 February 1988 (aged 26)	(India) United
—	Randhan Meitei	(India)	MF	13 March 1993 (aged 21)	(India) Pailan Arrows
—	Shankar Sampingiraj	(India)	MF	14 December 1994 (aged 19)	(India) Pailan Arrows
Attackers
7	Sean Rooney	(Australia)	ST	1 March 1989 (aged 25)	(Australia) Blacktown City FC
9	Robin Singh	(India)	ST	9 May 1990 (aged 23)	(India) East Bengal
11	Sunil Chhetri	(India)	ST	3 August 1984 (aged 29)	Sporting Portugal B
17	Karan Sawhney	(India)	ST	23 May 1992 (aged 21)	(India) Salgaocar

=== Season signings ===
Pos.	Player	Transferred From	Source
MF	(India) Thoi Singh	(India) Mumbai Tigers	
GK	(India) Bruno Colaço	(India) Sporting Goa	
DF	(India) Keegan Pereira	(India) Mumbai	
MF	(India) Gurtej Singh	(India) Churchill Brothers	
DF	(England) John Johnson	(England) Northampton Town	
DF	(Kenya) Curtis Osano	(England) AFC Wimbledon	
MF	(Liberia) Johnny Menyongar	(India) Shillong Lajong	
FW	(India) Robin Singh	(India) East Bengal	
FW	(India) Sunil Chhetri	Sporting Portugal B	
DF	(India) Vishal Kumar	(India) Pailan Arrows	
MF	(India) Don Bosco Andrew	(India) SESA Football Academy	
DF	(India) Lalrozama Fanai	(India) Mohun Bagan	
GK	(India) Ricardo Cardozo	(India) Tata Football Academy	
GK	(India) Pawan Kumar	(India) Salgaocar	
MF	(India) Malemngamba Meetei	(India) Salgaocar	
FW	(India) Karan Sawhney	(India) Salgaocar	
MF	(India) Darren Caldeira	(India) Mumbai	
DF	(India) Rino Anto	(India) Mohun Bagan	
MF	(India) Sampath Kuttymani	(India) Mumbai	
FW	(Australia) Sean Rooney	(Australia) Blacktown City FC	
MF	(India) Siam Hanghal	(India) Pailan Arrows	
MF	(India) Niroshan Mani	(India) Sporting Goa	
MF	(India) Amoes	(India) South United	
DF	(India) Nanjangud Shivananju Manju	(India) United Sikkim	
MF	(India) Beikhokhei Beingaichho	(India) East Bengal	
DF	(India) Thomas Lalengkima	(India) Aizawl	

==== Loan in ====
Position	Player	Loaned from	Date	Source
GK	(India) Soram Anganba	IMG–Reliance	13 December 2013	
MF	(India) Randhan Meitei	IMG–Reliance	13 December 2013	
MF	(India) Shankar Sampingiraj	IMG–Reliance	13 December 2013	
MF	(India) C.K. Vineeth	United	30 January 2014	

=== Management ===
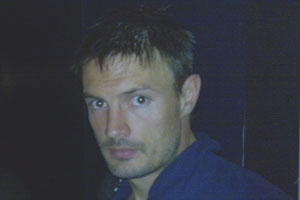
Ashley Westwood, the head coach Bengaluru FC for the 2013–14 season.

As of January 2014.

Position	Name
Head coach	(England) Ashley Westwood
Assistant coach	(Scotland) Pradhyum Reddy
Goalkeeping coach	(Turkey) Ali Uzunhasanoglu
Performance coach	(England) Malcolm Purchase
Head of Youth Development	(India) Richard Hood

== Player statistics ==
=== Appearances and goals ===
No.	Pos	Nat	Player	Total		I-League		Federation Cup	
No.	Pos	Nat	Player	Apps	Goals	Apps	Goals	Apps	Goals
1	GK	(India) IND	Pawan Kumar	23	0	20+0	0	3+0	0
2	DF	(India) IND	Nanjangud Shivananju Manju	3	0	2+1	0	0+0	0
3	DF	(India) IND	Vishal Kumar	12	0	6+5	0	0+1	0
4	DF	(Kenya) KEN	Curtis Osano	25	0	22+0	0	3+0	0
5	MF	(India) IND	Gurtej Singh	3	0	2+1	0	0+0	0
6	DF	(England) ENG	John Johnson	26	3	23+0	3	3+0	0
7	FW	(Australia) AUS	Sean Rooney	24	10	21+0	10	3+0	0
8	MF	(India) IND	Malemngamba Meetei	7	0	2+5	0	0+0	0
9	FW	(India) IND	Robin Singh	24	7	9+14	5	0+1	2
10	MF	(Liberia) LBR	Johnny Menyongar	26	3	23+0	3	3+0	0
11	FW	(India) IND	Sunil Chhetri	26	15	21+2	14	3+0	1
12	MF	(India) IND	Thoi Singh	24	4	19+2	3	3+0	1
13	DF	(India) IND	Rino Anto	26	0	20+3	0	3+0	0
14	MF	(India) IND	Sampath Kuttymani	0	0	0+0	0	0+0	0
15	MF	(India) IND	Darren Caldeira	16	0	8+7	0	0+1	0
17	FW	(India) IND	Karan Sawhney	3	0	0+3	0	0+0	0
18	MF	(India) IND	Beikhokhei Beingaichho	25	4	18+4	2	3+0	2
19	MF	(India) IND	Siam Hanghal	24	1	21+0	1	3+0	0
20	DF	(India) IND	Keegan Pereira	23	0	19+1	0	3+0	0
22	GK	(India) IND	Bruno Colaço	2	0	1+1	0	0+0	0
23	DF	(India) IND	Lalrozama Fanai	4	0	3+1	0	0+0	0
25	MF	(India) IND	Niroshan Mani	1	0	0+1	0	0+0	0
26	DF	(India) IND	Thomas Lalengkima	0	0	0+0	0	0+0	0
27	MF	(India) IND	Amoes	1	0	0+1	0	0+0	0
28	DF	(India) IND	Don Bosco Andrew	0	0	0+0	0	0+0	0
29	GK	(India) IND	Soram Anganba	4	0	3+1	0	0+0	0
30	GK	(India) IND	Ricardo Cardozo	0	0	0+0	0	0+0	0
31	MF	(India) IND	C.K. Vineeth	7	0	1+6	0	0+0	0
—	MF	(India) IND	Randhan Meitei	0	0	0+0	0	0+0	0
—	MF	(India) IND	Shankar Sampingiraj	0	0	0+0	0	0+0	0

- Source: soccerway

Updated: 28 April 2014

=== Top scorers ===
Place	Position	Nationality	Number	Name	I-League	Federation Cup	Total
1	FW	(India)	11	Sunil Chhetri	14	1	15
2	FW	(Australia)	7	Sean Rooney	10	0	10
3	FW	(India)	9	Robin Singh	5	2	7
4	FW	(India)	18	Beikhokhei Beingaichho	2	2	4
4	MF	(India)	12	Thoi Singh	3	1	4
6	DF	(England)	6	John Johnson	3	0	3
6	MF	(Liberia)	10	Johnny Menyongar	3	0	3
8	MF	(India)	19	Siam Hanghal	1	0	1
TOTALS					41	6	47

Updated: 28 April 2014 source

== International Caps ==
Players called for senior international duty during the 2013–14 season while under contract with Bengaluru FC.

Nationality	Position	Player	Competition	Date	Contribution	Opponent
India	FW	Sunil Chhetri	Friendly	14 August 2013	Started, played 70 minutes.	v Tajikistan
India	FW	Robin Singh	Friendly	14 August 2013	Subbed on in the 77th minute.	v Tajikistan
India	FW	Sunil Chhetri	2013 SAFF Championship	1 September 2013	Started, played the full match.	v Pakistan
India	FW	Sunil Chhetri	2013 SAFF Championship	3 September 2013	Started, played the full match, scored in the 95th minute.	v Bangladesh
India	FW	Robin Singh	2013 SAFF Championship	3 September 2013	Subbed on in the 85th minute.	v Bangladesh
India	FW	Sunil Chhetri	2013 SAFF Championship	5 September 2013	Started, played the full match.	v Nepal
India	FW	Robin Singh	2013 SAFF Championship	5 September 2013	Subbed on in the 58th minute.	v Nepal
India	FW	Robin Singh	2013 SAFF Championship	9 September 2013	Started, played the full match, yellow carded in the 95th minute.	v Maldives
India	FW	Sunil Chhetri	2013 SAFF Championship Final	11 September 2013	Subbed on in the 60th minute.	v Afghanistan
India	FW	Robin Singh	2013 SAFF Championship Final	11 September 2013	Started, played the full match.	v Afghanistan
India	FW	Sunil Chhetri	Friendly	15 November 2013	Started, played the full match, scored in the 41st minute.	v Philippines
India	FW	Robin Singh	Friendly	15 November 2013	Started, played 75 minutes.	v Philippines
India	FW	Sunil Chhetri	Friendly	19 November 2013	Started, played the full match, scored in the 21st minute.	v Nepal
India	FW	Robin Singh	Friendly	23 November 2013	Started, played the full match.	v Nepal
India	FW	Sunil Chhetri	Friendly	5 March 2014	Started, played the full match, scored in the 14th and 92nd minute.	v Bangladesh
India	FW	Robin Singh	Friendly	5 March 2014	Started, played 63 minutes.	v Bangladesh

== See also ==
- 2013–14 in Indian football
- Bengaluru FC
