= List of Bengaluru FC players =

This is the list of players who have played for Bengaluru FC since its inception in 2013.

== Current squad ==
=== First-team squad ===
As of 30 May 2025

Note: Flags indicate national team as defined under FIFA eligibility rules; some limited exceptions apply. Players may hold more than one non-FIFA nationality.

No.	Pos.	Nation	Player
1	GK	IND	Gurpreet Singh Sandhu (3rd captain)
3	DF	NED	Menno Koch (4th captain)
4	DF	IND	Chinglensana Singh Konsham
5	MF	ARG	Manuel de Iriondo
6	DF	POR	Sandro Sakho
7	FW	ESP	Borja Martínez
8	MF	IND	Suresh Singh Wangjam
9	FW	MNE	Mihailo Perović
10	FW	IND	Ryan Williams (vice-captain)
11	FW	IND	Sunil Chhetri (Captain)
14	MF	IND	Soham Varshneya
17	FW	IND	Monirul Molla
18	DF	IND	Ricky Meetei Haobam
22	MF	IND	Ashique Kuruniyan
23	MF	IND	Lalremtluanga Fanai

No.	Pos.	Nation	Player
26	DF	IND	Harsh Palande
27	DF	IND	Nikhil Poojary (5th captain)
28	GK	IND	Lalthuammawia Ralte
29	FW	IND	Serto Worneilen Kom
30	GK	IND	Sahil Poonia
31	MF	IND	Vinith Venkatesh
32	DF	IND	Naorem Roshan Singh
33	GK	IND	Aheibam Suraj Singh
37	FW	IND	Taorem Kelvin Singh
38	MF	IND	Ningthoukhongjam Rishi Singh
39	FW	IND	Sivasakthi Narayanan
48	MF	IND	MD Arbash
51	FW	IND	Chingambam Shivaldo Singh
66	DF	IND	Takhellambam Bungson Singh
—	DF	IND	Yaipharemba Chingakham
—	MF	IND	Takhellambam Bobbish

== List of players ==
- Appearances and goals are for I-League and Indian Super League matches only.
- Players are listed according to the date of their first team debut for the club. Only players with at least one appearance are included.

Statistics correct as of match played 10 March 2021

Table headers

- Nationality – If a player played international football, the country/countries he played for are shown. Otherwise, the player's nationality is given as their country of birth.
- Bengaluru FC career – The year of the player's first appearance for Bengaluru FC to the year of his last appearance.
- Starts – The number of games started.
- Sub – The number of games played as a substitute.
- Total – The total number of games played, both as a starter and as a substitute.

Positions key
GK	Goalkeeper
DF	Defender
MF	Midfielder
FW	Forward
U	Utility player^{1}

List of Bengaluru FC players
Name	Nationality	Position	Bengaluru FC career	Starts	Subs	Total	Goals	Ref
Name	Nationality	Position	Bengaluru FC career	Appearances			Goals	Ref
Pawan Kumar	India	GK	2013–2015	20	0	0	0	
Nanjangud Shivananju Manju	India	DF	2013–2016	3	3	6	0	
Vishal Kumar	India	DF	2013–2016	6	7	13	0	
Curtis Osano	Kenya	DF	2013–2016	57	0	57	2	
Gurtej Singh	India	MF	2013–2015	2	1	3	2	
John Johnson	England	DF	2013–2018	84	2	86	4	
Sean Rooney	Australia	FW	2013–2015	38	0	38	14	
Malemngamba Meetei	India	MF	2013–2015	2	7	9	0	
Robin Singh	India	FW	2013–2015	19	22	41	11	
Johnny Menyongar	Liberia	MF	2013–2014	23	0	23	3	
Sunil Chhetri	India	FW	2013–present	144	6	150	68	
Thoi Singh	India	MF	2013–2016	42	8	50	8	
Rino Anto	India	DF	2013–2017; 2018–2020	57	10	67	1	
Darren Caldeira	India	MF	2013–2015; 2016–2016	8	7	15	0	
Karan Sawhney	India	FW	2013–2015	0	3	3	0	
Beikhokhei Beingaichho	India	MF	2013–2017	29	11	40	4	
Siam Hanghal	India	MF	2013–2016	23	2	25	1	
Keegan Pereira	India	DF	2013–2017	35	3	38	0	
Bruno Colaço	India	GK	2013–2014	1	1	2	0	
Lalrozama Fanai	India	DF	2013–2014	3	1	4	0	
Niroshan Mani	India	MF	2013–2014	0	1	1	0	
Amoes Do	India	MF	2013–2014	0	1	1	0	
Soram Anganba	India	GK	2013–2015	4	1	5	0	
Shankar Sampingiraj	India	MF	2013–2017	16	5	21	5	
C.K. Vineeth	India	MF	2014–2017	26	28	54	14	
Josh Walker	England	MF	2014–2016	17	0	17	2	
Eugeneson Lyngdoh	India	MF	2014–2017; 2019–2020	40	8	48	10	
Udanta Singh	India	FW	2014–present	86	27	113	12	
Lalchhuanmawia Fanai	India	DF	2014–2017	24	4	28	0	
Lalthuammawia Ralte	India	GK	2014–2018; 2020–	29	0	29	0	
Kim Song-Yong	North Korea	FW	2015–2016	13	1	14	5	
Seminlen Doungel	India	FW	2015–2017	5	13	18	3	
Alwyn George	India	MF	2015–2018	10	15	25	1	
Nishu Kumar	India	DF	2015–2020	48	7	55	2	
Daniel Lalhlimpuia	India	FW	2015–2018	10	12	22	3	
Malsawmzuala	India	MF	2015–2018	9	6	15	1	
Salam Ranjan Singh	India	DF	2015–2017	9	5	14	1	
Michael Collins	Ireland	MF	2016–2016	10	0	10	0	
Amrinder Singh	India	GK	2016–2017	23	0	23	0	
Álvaro Rubio (Note: Rubio represented Bengaluru FC in 2016 AFC Cup)	Spain	MF	2016–2016	0	0	0	0	
Arindam Bhattacharya	India	GK	2016–2017	5	1	6	0	
Juanan	Spain	DF	2016–present	84	1	85	5	
Cameron Watson	Australia	MF	2016–2017	16	0	16	0	
Gursimrat Singh	India	DF	2016–2017; 2018–2020	3	5	8	0	
Harmanjot Khabra	India	DF	2016–2021	79	3	82	1	
Sena Ralte	India	DF	2016–2017	6	1	7	1	
Lenny Rodrigues	India	MF	2016–2018	27	4	31	2	
Mandar Rao Desai	India	MF	2016–2017	3	6	9	1	
Sandesh Jhingan	India	DF	2017–2017	10	1	11	1	
Cornell Glen (Note: Glen represented Bengaluru FC in 2016–17 Indian Federation Cup)	Trinidad and Tobago	FW	2017–2017	0	0	0	0	
Marjan Jugović	Serbia	FW	2017–2017	2	4	6	1	
Roby Norales	Honduras	FW	2017–2017	1	3	4	1	
Braulio Nóbrega	Spain	FW	2017–2018	2	8	10	0	
Edu García	Spain	MF	2017–2018	12	2	14	2	
Gurpreet Singh Sandhu	India	GK	2017–	77	0	77	0	
Abhra Mondal	India	GK	2017–2018	0	1	1	1	
Rahul Bheke	India	DF	2017–2021	65	5	70	5	
Collin Abranches (Note: Abranches represented Bengaluru FC in 2018 AFC Cup)	India	DF	2017–2018	0	0	0	0	
Zohmingliana Ralte	India	DF	2017–2018	0	1	1	0	
Subhasish Bose	India	DF	2017–2018	14	4	18	0	
Joyner Lourenco (Note: Lourenco represented Bengaluru FC in 2018 AFC Cup)	India	DF	2017–2018	0	0	0	0	
Prashanth Kalinga (Note: Kalinga represented Bengaluru FC in 2018 AFC Cup)	India	DF	2017–2019	0	0	0	0	
Asheer Akhtar (Note: Akhtar represented Bengaluru FC in 2018 AFC Cup)	India	DF	2017–2019	0	0	0	0	
Dimas Delgado	Spain	MF	2017–2021	62	5	67	4	
Erik Paartalu	Australia	MF	2017–2021	61	6	67	9	
Boithang Haokip	India	MF	2017–2019	8	13	21	2	
Toni	Spain	MF	2017–2018	6	7	13	0	
Myron Mendes	India	MF	2017–2019	0	1	1	0	
Robinson Singh (Note: Singh represented Bengaluru FC in 2018 AFC Cup)	India	MF	2017–2019	0	0	0	0	
Leon Augustine	India	FW	2017–	3	8	11	1	
Víctor Pérez Alonso	Spain	MF	2017–2018	0	1	1	0	
Miku	Venezuela	FW	2017–2019	31	1	32	20	
Daniel Lucas Segovia	Spain	FW	2017–2018	0	5	5	0	
Thongkhosiem Haokip	India	FW	2017–	3	25	28	2	
Cletus Paul (Note: Paul represented Bengaluru FC in 2018 AFC Cup)	India	FW	2017–2018	0	0	0	0	
Chencho Gyeltshen	Bhutan	FW	2018–2019	4	5	9	2	
Albert Serrán	Spain	DF	2018–2020	31	3	34	1	
Sairuat Kima	India	DF	2018–2020	2	0	2	0	
Parag Shrivas	India	DF	2018–	9	4	13	0	
Kean Lewis	India	MF	2018–2020	5	15	20	0	
Luisma	Spain	MF	2018–2019	6	0	6	0	
Xisco Hernández	Spain	MF	2018–2019; 2021–2021	18	5	20	1	
Álex Barrera	Spain	MF	2018–2019	3	0	3	0	
Ajay Chhetri	India	MF	2018–2020	1	1	2	0	
Edmund Lalrindika	India	FW	2018–	2	8	10	0	
Ashique Kuruniyan	India	FW	2019–	19	6	25	1	
Manuel Onwu	Spain	FW	2019–2020	5	1	6	0	
Prabhsukhan Singh Gill	India	GK	2019–2020	1	0	1	0	
Raphael Augusto	Brazil	MF	2019–2020	9	0	9	0	
Suresh Singh Wangjam	India	MF	2019–	25	6	31	1	
Nili	Spain	MF	2019–2020	2	4	6	0	
Deshorn Brown	Jamaica	FW	2019–2021	10	7	17	3	
Amay Morajkar	India	MF	2019–	2	6	8	0	
Kevaughn Frater	Jamaica	FW	2019–2020	1	3	4	1	
Roshan Singh	India	FW	2019–	0	2	2	0	
Biswa Kumar Darjee (Note: Darjee represented Bengaluru FC in 2020 AFC Cup)	India	DF	2019–	0	0	0	0	
Pratik Chaudhari	India	DF	2020–	10	5	15	0	
Wungngayam Muirang	India	DF	2020–	1	1	2	0	
Ajith Kumar	India	DF	2020–	6	2	8	0	
Namgyal Bhutia	India	MF	2020–	2	0	2	0	
Fran González	Spain	DF	2020–	10	8	18	1	
Cleiton Silva	Brazil	FW	2020–	18	0	18	7	
Yrondu Musavu-King (Note: Musavu-King represented Bengaluru FC in 2021 AFC Cup)	Gabon	DF	2021–	0	0	0	0	

== Club captains ==
Sunil Chhetri is Bengaluru FC's first and current captain.

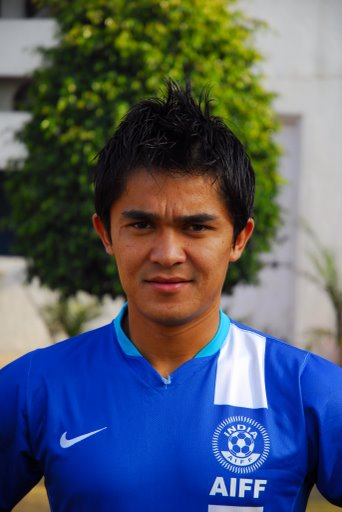
Sunil Chhetri, the first captain of Bengaluru FC.

Dates	Name	Notes
2013–present	Sunil Chhetri	

== Notes ==
- A utility player is one who is considered to play in more than one position.
