= 2015 Indian Federation Cup final =

- Event: 2014–15 Indian Federation Cup
| Dempo | Bengaluru FC |
| 1 | 2 |
- Date: 11 January 2015
- Venue: Fatorda Stadium, Margao, Goa
- Referee: Pratap Singh
- Weather: Sunny, Clear sky 34 °C (93 °F); 22% Humidity

The 2015 Indian Federation Cup final was a football match between Dempo and Bengaluru FC played on 11 January 2015 at Fatorda Stadium in Margao, Goa. The match was the culmination of the 2014–15 Indian Federation Cup. This was the 36th edition of the Federation Cup, the national cup tournament of football in India which is administered by the All India Football Federation (AIFF). Bengaluru FC won the final by defeating Dempo 2–1 with goals scored by Sunil Chhetri and Robin Singh while the Dempo goal came from a spot kick by Tolgay Ozbey. This was the first time Bengaluru FC had won the tournament.

Dempo qualified for the final by defeating Salgaocar in the semi-final 2–0 while Bengaluru FC qualified by defeating Sporting Goa in the semi-finals 3–0.

The final was televised live on TEN Action.

== Road to the final ==
The Federation Cup is an annual Indian football competition open to all I-League teams. Ten of the eleven I-League clubs participated in the tournament the season with Bharat FC being the excluded club. The 2014–15 edition was the 36th of the competition.

=== Dempo ===
| Round | Opposition | Score |
|---|---|---|
| GS | East Bengal | 1–0 |
| GS | Sporting Goa | 4–1 |
| GS | Mumbai | 2–0 |
| GS | Royal Wahingdoh | 1–1 |
| SF | Salgaocar | 2–0 |

Prior to reaching the 2014 final, Dempo had reached the final of the Federation Cup five times. They began their 2014–15 Federation Cup campaign on 29 December 2014 in the first match of the group stages against fellow I-League side East Bengal. The match took place at the Fatorda Stadium in Margao, Goa . The venue would turn out to be the only stadium Dempo play in throughout the entire tournament. A Romeo Fernandes first-half header helped local giants Dempo SC down East Bengal by a solitary goal in the Group A tie. Dempo went on to win 1–0 to open their season on a winning note.

Dempo then played their second match of the group on New Year's Eve against fellow I-League Goan side Sporting Goa. Tolgay Ozbey scored two from the spot in a well deserved hattrick to set up a convincing 4-1 Dempo win. Ozbey scored two penalties either side of halftime after opening the floodgates in the 11th minute to script a comprehensive win for the Goan heavyweights thus sailing smoothly towards a last-four berth. Beevan D’Mello pulled one back when the score read 3-1 but Romeo Fernandes added gloss to the score with a late strike. Joyner Laourenco was at fault this time felling the 28-year-old inside the area to give away the second penalty of the match. Tolgay converted with aplomb to bring up his hattrick – the first of the tournament so far – sending Nandy the wrong way to tuck home low into the bottom left corner. Romeo put the icing on the cake at the end of the match latching onto substitute Alwyn George's pass to go solo and power home low into the back of the net.

Dempo then played their third match of the group on 5 January 2014 against Mumbai. First-half strikes from India International Clifford Miranda and the impressive Romeo Fernandes made sure the Dempo juggernaut kept rolling as Arthur Papas's wards made short work of Mumbai FC who needed to win this match to stay in the hunt, without the services of talisman Tolgay Ozbey who was not even named on the bench. Coming to the match, it took the team to beat of the tourney 13 minutes to surge ahead. Romeo's corner was aimed Holicharan – seamlessly slipping into Tolgay's shoes – who mistimed his shot with the ball falling to an unmarked Clifford who had the easiest of tasks of nodding the ball into the back of the net. It was one way traffic all the way and Dempo soon after doubled their tally.

In the final match of the group stage, Dempo faced off against new I-League entrants Royal Wahingdoh. Romeo Fernandes scored the winning goal to confirm the semi-final berth for Dempo. He latched on to a loose ball on the edge of the area to sidestep Loveday Okechukwu delicately and make space for himself before firing the ball into the far post with aplomb. The goal made him part of the triumvirate of top-scorers along with Salgaocar's Douhou Pierre and India and Bengaluru FC Captain Sunil Chhetri. Romeo also holds the record of scoring in all of Dempo's four matches, the only player in the tournament to do so. Earlier, Bekay Bawar gave the Shilong outfit the lead in the 36th minute.

On 9 January 2015, Dempo played in the semi-final of the Federation Cup against Goan rivals Salgaocar. Salgaocar made it through to the semi-finals by beating Shillong Lajong, Mohun Bagan and Pune. Their only loss was against Bengaluru FC in their group. The one-time champions stayed true to their reputation with Tolgay Ozbey at the double either side of halftime. The Aussie scored off a deflection in the first half and bettered his tally from the spot after the break. Salgaocar got their best chance in the second half through Douhou Pierre but the former Pune FC man failed to connect. Salgaocar on the hand were forced to make one change to their line up from the last match, Brian Mascarenhas having to fill the big shoes of injured Darryl Duffy. Dempo made it through to the final through a handsome 2–0 win over Salgaocar.

=== Bengaluru FC ===
| Round | Opposition | Score |
|---|---|---|
| GS | Salgaocar | 3–2 |
| GS | Mohun Bagan | 0–0 |
| GS | Shillong Lajong | 1–0 |
| GS | Pune | 2–0 |
| SF | Sporting Goa | 3–0 |

This was the first time Bengaluru FC made it to the final of the Federation Cup since its establishment in 2013. The Tilak Maidan in Vasco served as the venue for all group stage matches for Bengaluru FC. Bengaluru FC began their 2014–15 Federation Cup campaign on 28 December 2014 against I-League side Salgaocar at the Tilak Maidan which was also the opening match of the competition. Sunil Chhetri scored two and set up the other as Bengaluru FC braved a stiff challenge from Salgaocar FC to script a 3–2 win in the opener. Chhetri got the first goal of the tournament after Rooney's shot from inside the box hit Pawan Kumar's hand. The referee pointed towards the spot and the Captain was at hand to place the ball just perfectly into the bottom right corner with India colleague Subrata Paul guessing right but to no avail. But the I-League champions' joy was short-lived as the local outfit pegged back after just seven minutes. Gurjinder sent in a dipping free kick from almost 35 yards which bounced awkwardly for keeper Lalthuammanwia Ralte and bundled in. With four minutes to go on the clock Bengaluru FC added their third. Chhetri turned provider this time, setting up Rooney on the left with the Australian placing it to the keeper's left.

Bengaluru FC played Mohun Bagan on 30 December. Both sides found themselves on the wrong side of luck as the woodwork came in between once apiece for either team in the second half. The match ended in a goal less draw. The best BFC could muster was a half opportunity where Darren failed to meet a Beikhkhei- Beingaichho cross in front of goal.

Bengaluru FC then played their third match on 2 January 2015 against Shillong Lajong. Robin Singh scored five minutes after coming on at halftime, receiving a pass from captain Sunil Chhetri in the centre of the pitch and making space for himself to slot home albeit with the help of a slight defection off the inside back post. Coach Ashley Westwood was back on the touchline after serving a four-match ban from last season – tinkered with his starting XI making four changes from the last game against Mohun Bagan which ended goalless. BFC went on to win the match 1–0. The win helped BFC inch closer to the semifinal berth.

Bengaluru FC played their last group stage match against Pune. Sunil Chhetri found the back of the net twice in the 43rd and 47th minute to give BFC a 2–0 lead at half time. Pune Coach Karim Bencherifa ringed in the changes after the break to reverse their fortunes. Mathew Golsalves was taken off for the more adventurous Munmum Lugun at right-back at halftime while Anthony D’Souza – already among goals –replaced Ryuji Sueoka at the hour mark. Haokip scored the only goal for Pune getting just enough on a high ball which the keeper failed to collect neatly after a Nikhil Kadam drive ballooned up and high. With this win Bengaluru FC became the first team to enter semifinal of the competition.

On 9 January 2014, Bengaluru FC played their semi-final match against Goan club Sporting Goa. Sean Rooney gave Bengaluru FC the lead in the 28th minute with India Captain Sunil Chhetri joining him on the scoresheet ten minutes later with another wonderful strike from a narrow angle. Late into the second half, Eugeneson Lyngdoh added gloss to the scoreline with a cool finish. Sporting on their part tried hard after the break but could find the woodwork late in the second half through Anthony Wolfe. Rino Anto also cleared off his line in the first half off a Wolfe header. Beikhokhei Beingaichho – coming in place of Robin Singh – sent in a teasing cross for Sunil Chhetri but Ravi Kumar was up to the task. At the other end Rino Anto made a goalline clearance off Wolfe's header from a Cajetan Fernandes corner. That was that for the Flaming Oranje before their rivals surged ahead riding a flurry of attacks. Sunil Chhetri picked out Keegan with a delightful ball on the left. The left-back on the overlap slid in for Rooney inside the box with the Aussie striker having the easiest task of tapping the ball into an empty net. Wolfe's freekick was first well saved by Lalthuammawia Ralte and sometime later the Trinidad & Tobago striker hit the woodwork from 30 yards. The next minute, BFC made sure of the points. Eugeneson collected substitute Robin Singh's pass from the left to place the ball calmly into the back post. The match went out of had for Sporting and Bengaluru FC stormed into the final with a thrashing 3–0 win.

== Match ==
=== Details ===
11 January 2015
16:00 IST

| Dempo | 1–2 | Bengaluru FC |
|---|---|---|
| Özbey 45+3' (pen.) | Report | Chhetri 10' (pen.); Singh 65' |

Fatorda Stadium, Goa
Referee: Pratap Singh

| Dempo | Bengaluru FC |

| GK | 38 | (India) Laxmikant Kattimani |
| DF | 4 | (India) Rowilson Rodrigues | (red card) 68' |
| DF | 20 | (India) Fulganco Cardozo |
| DF | 18 | (Afghanistan) Zohib Islam Amiri |
| MF | 6 | (India) Peter Carvalho |
| MF | 17 | (India) Mandar Rao Desai | (yellow card) 36' | (substituted off) 69' |
| MF | 30 | (India) Francis Fernandes |
| MF | 15 | (India) Clifford Miranda |
| MF | 19 | (India) Romeo Fernandes |
| MF | 21 | (India) Jewel Raja |
| FW | 9 | (Australia) Tolgay Özbey | | (substituted off) 51' |
Substitutes:
| GK | 1 | (India) Bruno Colaço |
| DF | 3 | (India) Shallum Pires |
| DF | 16 | (India) Samir Subash Naik |
| DF | 42 | (India) Narayan Das |
| MF | 7 | (India) Alwyn George | (yellow card) 77' | (substituted in) 69' |
| MF | 14 | (India) Gabriel Fernandes |
| MF | 22 | (India) Vinit Rai |
| FW | 11 | (India) Holicharan Narzary | | (substituted in) 51' |
Manager:
(Australia) Arthur Papas

| GK | 28 | (India) Lalthuammawia Ralte |
| DF | 20 | (India) Keegan Pereira |
| DF | 6 | (England) John Johnson | (yellow card) 45+2' |
| DF | 4 | (Kenya) Curtis Osano |
| DF | 13 | (India) Rino Anto |
| MF | 14 | (India) Eugeneson Lyngdoh |
| MF | 10 | (England) Josh Walker | | (substituted off) 24' |
| MF | 12 | (India) Thoi Singh |
| MF | 18 | (India) Beikhokhei Beingaichho | | (substituted off) 81' |
| FW | 11 | (India) Sunil Chhetri |
| FW | 7 | (Australia) Sean Rooney |
Substitutes:
| GK | 1 | (India) Pawan Kumar |
| DF | 2 | (India) Nanjangud Shivananju Manju |
| DF | 23 | (India) Lalchhuan Mawia | (yellow card) 82' | (substituted in) 81' |
| MF | 16 | (India) Shankar Sampingiraj |
| MF | 31 | (India) C.K. Vineeth |
| MF | 15 | (India) Darren Caldeira |
| MF | 19 | (India) Siam Hanghal |
| MF | 9 | (India) Robin Singh | (yellow card) 71' | (substituted in) 24' |
| MF | 21 | (India) Udanta Singh |
Manager:
(England) Ashley Westwood

Hero of the match:
(Kenya) Curtis Osano (Bengaluru FC)
