= 2017–18 ATK season =

4th season in existence of ATK

ATK
2017–18 season
- Owners: Kolkata Games and Sports Pvt. Ltd.
- Head Coach: Teddy Sheringham
- Stadium: Salt Lake Stadium
- Indian Super League: 9th
- Super Cup: Round of 16
- Highest home attendance: 32,816
- Lowest home attendance: 3,165
- Average home league attendance: 12,669
Home colours	Away colours	Third colours

The 2017 ATK season was the club's fourth season since its establishment in 2014 and their fourth season in the Indian Super League. The club ended a three-season association with the Spanish La Liga club Atlético Madrid and was abbreviated to ATK This season the club is coached by Teddy Sheringham and former Bengaluru FC coach, Ashley Westwood is given role of technical director.

== Transfers ==
=== Pre-season ===
In: Note: Flags indicate national team as defined under FIFA eligibility rules; some limited exceptions apply. Players may hold more than one non-FIFA nationality.

No.	Pos.	Nation	Player
3	DF	IND	Nallappan Mohanraj (from (India) Chennaiyin)
4	MF	ENG	Conor Thomas (from (England) Swindon Town)
5	DF	ENG	Tom Thorpe (from (England) Rotherham United)
6	DF	ESP	Jordi (from (Germany) Karlsruher SC)
7	MF	ENG	Carl Baker (from (England) Portsmouth)
9	FW	IND	Robin Singh (from (India) Goa)
10	FW	IRL	Robbie Keane (from (United States) LA Galaxy)
11	FW	IND	Jayesh Rane (from (India) Chennaiyin)
13	GK	IND	Kunzang Bhutia (from (India) Fateh Hyderabad)
14	MF	IND	Eugeneson Lyngdoh (from (India) Bengaluru)
15	MF	IND	Darren Caldeira (from (India) Bengaluru)
16	MF	IND	Shankar Sampingiraj (from (India) Bengaluru)
17	MF	IND	Rupert Nongrum (from (India) Shillong Lajong)
18	MF	IND	Hitesh Sharma (from (India) Mumbai)
20	DF	IND	Keegan Pereira (from (India) Bengaluru)
21	MF	IND	Ronald Singh
22	GK	FIN	Jussi Jääskeläinen (from (England) Wigan Athletic)
23	DF	IND	Anwar Ali (from (India) East Bengal)
24	GK	IND	Debjit Majumder (from (India) Mohun Bagan)
29	FW	IND	Bipin Singh (from (India) Shillong Lajong)
31	DF	IND	Augustin Fernandes (from (India) Salgaocar)
33	DF	IND	Prabir Das (from (India) Mohun Bagan)
36	DF	IND	Ashutosh Mehta (from (India) Mumbai City)
87	FW	POR	Zequinha (from (Portugal) Nacional)
99	FW	FIN	Njazi Kuqi (from (Finland) Inter Turku)

Out: Note: Flags indicate national team as defined under FIFA eligibility rules; some limited exceptions apply. Players may hold more than one non-FIFA nationality.

No.	Pos.	Nation	Player
2	DF	POR	Henrique Sereno (to (Spain) Almería)
4	DF	ESP	Tiri (to (Spain) Marbella)
5	DF	IND	Arnab Mondal (loan return to (India) East Bengal)
6	DF	IND	Kingshuk Debnath (loan return to (India) Mohun Bagan)
7	FW	CAN	Iain Hume (to (Spain) Extremadura)
8	MF	IND	Jewel Raja (to (India) Minerva Punjab)
9	FW	POR	Hélder Postiga
10	MF	ESP	Borja Fernández (to (Spain) Almería)
11	MF	RSA	Sameehg Doutie (to (South Africa) Ajax Cape Town)
12	DF	IND	Pritam Kotal (loan return to (India) Mohun Bagan)
13	MF	IND	Bikramjit Singh (loan return to (India) Mohun Bagan)
14	GK	ESP	Dani Mallo (to (Spain) Hospitalet)
15	MF	ESP	Javi Lara (to (Spain) Córdoba)
16	DF	IND	Robert Lalthlamuana (loan return to (India) East Bengal)
17	MF	IND	Bidyananda Singh (to (India) Bengaluru 'B')
19	FW	ESP	Juan Belencoso (to (Spain) Socuéllamos)
20	MF	IND	Lalrindika Ralte (loan return to (India) East Bengal)
21	MF	IND	Bikash Jairu (loan return to (India) East Bengal)
22	GK	IND	Shilton Paul (loan return to (India) Mohun Bagan)
23	MF	BOT	Ofentse Nato
24	GK	IND	Debjit Majumder (loan return to (India) Mohun Bagan)
25	MF	SCO	Stephen Pearson (to (Scotland) Motherwell)
33	DF	IND	Prabir Das (loan return to (India) Mohun Bagan)
34	MF	IND	Abhinas Ruidas (to (India) Mumbai City)
80	DF	IND	Keegan Pereira (to (India) Bengaluru)

=== During the season ===
In: Note: Flags indicate national team as defined under FIFA eligibility rules; some limited exceptions apply. Players may hold more than one non-FIFA nationality.

No.	Pos.	Nation	Player
8	MF	ENG	Ryan Taylor (from (England) Port Vale)

Out: Note: Flags indicate national team as defined under FIFA eligibility rules; some limited exceptions apply. Players may hold more than one non-FIFA nationality.

No.	Pos.	Nation	Player
7	MF	ENG	Carl Baker

== Players ==
=== Current squad ===
As of 17 April 2018

Note: Flags indicate national team as defined under FIFA eligibility rules; some limited exceptions apply. Players may hold more than one non-FIFA nationality.

No.	Pos.	Nation	Player
3	DF	IND	Nallappan Mohanraj
4	MF	ENG	Conor Thomas
5	DF	ENG	Tom Thorpe
6	DF	ESP	Jordi
8	MF	ENG	Ryan Taylor
9	FW	IND	Robin Singh
10	FW	IRL	Robbie Keane
11	FW	IND	Jayesh Rane
13	GK	IND	Kunzang Bhutia
14	MF	IND	Eugeneson Lyngdoh
15	MF	IND	Darren Caldeira
16	MF	IND	Shankar Sampingiraj
17	MF	IND	Rupert Nongrum

No.	Pos.	Nation	Player
18	MF	IND	Hitesh Sharma
20	DF	IND	Keegan Pereira
21	MF	IND	Ronald Singh
—	MF	WAL	David Cotterill
23	DF	IND	Anwar Ali
24	GK	IND	Debjit Majumder
29	MF	IND	Bipin Singh
31	DF	IND	Augustin Fernandes
33	DF	IND	Prabir Das
36	DF	IND	Ashutosh Mehta
87	FW	POR	Zequinha
—	FW	NIR	Martin Paterson

=== U18 Team ===
As of 23 July 2017.

Note: Flags indicate national team as defined under FIFA eligibility rules; some limited exceptions apply. Players may hold more than one non-FIFA nationality.

No.	Pos.	Nation	Player
1	GK	IND	Miraj Ali Ata
2	DF	IND	Nandalal Sarkar
3	DF	IND	Raju Roy
4	DF	IND	Robilal Mandi
6	DF	IND	Pratik Biswas
7	MF	IND	Sunil Mandi
8	MF	IND	Kitam Das
9	FW	IND	Tubai Hati
10	FW	IND	Gourav Chhetry
11	MF	IND	Rajib Das
12	MF	IND	Ajay Murmu
14	MF	IND	Dipak Das

No.	Pos.	Nation	Player
15	MF	IND	Prosenjit Adhikary
17	MF	IND	Sk. Suraj
18	FW	IND	Sumay Shome
19	MF	IND	Sayan Ghosh
20	MF	IND	Sujit Soren
22	MF	IND	Somenath Dhar
23	MF	IND	Sohan Chakraborty
25	DF	IND	Md Shadab
28	DF	IND	Sk. Juman
31	GK	IND	Gobinda Tigga
99	GK	IND	Tarak Barui

== Indian Super League ==
=== League table ===
Pos	Team	Pld	W	D	L	GF	GA	GD	Pts
6	Kerala Blasters	18	6	7	5	20	22	−2	25
7	Mumbai City	18	7	2	9	25	29	−4	23
8	Delhi Dynamos	18	5	4	9	27	37	−10	19
9	ATK	18	4	4	10	16	30	−14	16
10	NorthEast United	18	3	2	13	12	27	−15	11

Source: Indian Super League
Rules for classification: 1) points; 2) head-to-head points; 3) head-to-head goal difference; 4) head-to-head goals scored; 5) goal difference; 5) number of goals scored; 6) fair play ranking; 6) drawing of lots

=== Matches ===
17 November 2017 1	Kerala Blasters	0–0	ATK	Kaloor
20:00 IST (UTC+5:30)		Report		Stadium: Kaloor Stadium; Attendance: 37,462; Referee: Aurélien Juenkou (Cameroon)

26 November 2017 2	ATK	1–4	Pune City	Kolkata
IST (UTC+5:30)	Bi. Singh 50'	Report	Marcelinho 13', 60'; R. Kumar 51'; Alfaro 80'	Stadium: Salt Lake Stadium; Attendance: 32,816; Referee: C. R. Srikrishna

1 December 2017 3	Jamshedpur	0–0	ATK	Jamshedpur
IST (UTC+5:30)		Report		Stadium: JRD Tata Sports Complex; Attendance: 23,891; Referee: Santhosh Kumar

7 December 2017 4	Chennaiyin	3–2	ATK	Chennai
IST (UTC+5:30)	Lalpekhlua 65', 90+1'; Calderón 84'	Report	Zequinha 77'; Kuqi 89'	Stadium: Jawaharlal Nehru Stadium; Attendance: 17,192; Referee: Santhosh Kumar

17 December 2017 5	Mumbai City	0–1	ATK	Mumbai
IST (UTC+5:30)		Report	R. Singh 54'	Stadium: Mumbai Football Arena; Attendance: 8,403; Referee: R Venkatesh

23 December 2017 6	ATK	1–0	Delhi Dynamos	Kolkata
IST (UTC+5:30)	Keane 78'	Report		Stadium: Salt Lake Stadium; Attendance: 22,478; Referee: Ajit Meetei

3 January 2018 7	ATK	1–1	Goa	Kolkata
IST (UTC+7:15)	Keane 4'	Report	Coro 24'	Stadium: Salt Lake Stadium; Attendance: 19,626; Referee: C. R. Srikrishna

7 January 2018 8	Bengaluru	1–0	ATK	Bangalore
IST (UTC+5:30)	Chhetri 39'	Report		Stadium: Sree Kanteerava Stadium; Attendance: 17,942; Referee: Tejas Nagvenkar

12 January 2018 9	NorthEast United	0–1	ATK	Guwahati
IST (UTC+5:30)		Report	Zequinha 73'	Stadium: Indira Gandhi Athletic Stadium; Attendance: 4,293; Referee: Rowan Arumughan

20 January 2018 10	Pune City	3–0	ATK	Pune
IST (UTC+5:30)	Khan 32'; Diego 59'; R. Kumar 77'	Report		Stadium: Shree Shiv Chhatrapati Sports Complex; Attendance: 9,157; Referee: R Venkatesh

25 January 2017 11	ATK	1–2	Chennaiyin	Kolkata
IST (UTC+5:30)	Paterson 44'	Report	Maílson 52'; Lalpekhlua 64'	Stadium: Salt Lake Stadium; Attendance: 10,065; Referee: Raul Gupta

28 January 2018 12	ATK	0–1	Jamshedpur	Kolkata
IST (UTC+5:30)		Report	Gonçalves 66' (pen.)	Stadium: Salt Lake Stadium; Attendance: 11,663; Referee: Umesh Bora

3 February 2018 13	ATK	0–2	Bengaluru	Kolkata
IST (UTC+5:30)		Report	Jordi 3' (o.g.); Miku 83'	Stadium: Salt Lake Stadium; Attendance: 5,295; Referee: Tejas Nagvenkar

9 February 2018 14	ATK	2–2	Kerala Blasters	Kolkata
IST (UTC+5:30)	Taylor 38'; Thorpe 75'	Report	Baldvinsson 33'; Berbatov 55'	Stadium: Salt Lake Stadium; Attendance: 4,292; Referee: R Venkatesh

18 February 2018 15	ATK	1–2	Mumbai City	Kolkata
IST (UTC+5:30)	Bi. Singh 47'	Report	Rosário 32'; Jordà 53'	Stadium: Salt Lake Stadium; Attendance: 4,621; Referee: Santhosh Kumar

24 February 2018 16	Delhi Dynamos	4–3	ATK	Delhi
IST (UTC+5:30)	Uche 22', 69'; Sei. Singh 71'; Mirabaje 90+2'	Report	Mbatha 37'; Keane 52', 58'	Stadium: Jawaharlal Nehru Stadium; Attendance: 3,189; Referee: Rowan Arumughan

28 February 2018 17	Goa	5–1	ATK	Goa
IST (UTC+5:30)	Chechi 10'; Lanzarote 15', 21'; Coro 64'; Sifneos 90'	Report	Keane 87'	Stadium: Jawarharlal Nehru Stadium; Attendance: 17,244; Referee: Matthew Conger (New Zealand)

4 March 2018 18	ATK	1–0	NorthEast United	Kolkata
IST (UTC+5:30)	Keane 10'	Report		Stadium: Salt Lake Stadium; Attendance: 3,165; Referee: Matthew Conger (New Zealand)

=== Super Cup ===
==== Qualification round ====
As one of the bottom four teams in Indian Super League, ATK entered the Super Cup in the qualifier round where they faced Chennai City for a spot in the Round of 16. The match began with ATK on the front foot as expected. They sealed their berth in the pre-quarter finals by winning the match 4–1.

== Super Cup ==
=== Qualification round ===
ATK drawn with Chennai City in qualification stage. They defeated them by 4-1. And qualified for Round of 16.

16 March 2018 Qualification round	ATK	4–1	Chennai City	Bhubaneswar
20:00 IST	Hitesh 37'; Zequinha 58'; Ashutosh Mehta 76'; Robbie Keane 83'	Report	Joachim 45+7'	Stadium: Kalinga Stadium; Attendance: 3,000; Referee: Ajitkumar Lairenlakpam

=== Round of 16 ===
In the round of 16, ATK was defeated by fellow Indian Super League side, FC Goa 3-1.

3 April 2018 Round of 16	Goa	3-1	ATK	Bhubaneswar
20:00 IST	Coro 45+1'; Boumous 70'; Fernandes 77'		Keane 50'	Stadium: Kalinga Stadium; Attendance: 2,583; Referee: Rowan Arumughan

== Squad statistics ==
As of Match played 31 March 2018

=== Appearances and goals ===
No.	Pos	Nat	Player	Indian Super League		Indian Super Cup	
No.	Pos	Nat	Player	Apps	Goals	Apps	Goals
4	MF	(England)	Conor Thomas	18	0	2	0
5	DF	(England)	Tom Thorpe	7	0	0	0
6	DF	(Spain)	Jordi	15	0	2	0
8	MF		Ryan Taylor	9	0	1	0
9	FW		Robin Singh	4	1	2+2	1
10	FW		Robbie Keane	2	0	1+1	0
11	FW		Jayesh Rane	1	0	0+1	0
14	MF		Eugeneson Lyngdoh	3	0	3	0
16	MF		Shankar Sampingiraj	2	0	0+2	0
17	MF		Rupert Nongrum	5	0	3+2	0
18	MF		Hitesh Sharma	4	0	4	0
20	DF		Keegan Pereira	4	0	4	0
21	MF		Ronald Singh	1	0	0+1	0
22	GK		Jussi Jääskeläinen	1	0	1	0
23	DF		Anwar Ali	1	0	1	0
24	GK		Debjit Majumder	4	0	4	0
29	MF		Bipin Singh	4	1	3+1	1
33	DF		Prabir Das	5	0	5	0
36	DF		Ashutosh Mehta	2	0	1+1	0
87	FW		Zequinha	5	1	5	1
99	FW		Njazi Kuqi	5	1	3+2	1
Players who left ATK due to injury during the season:

=== Goal scorers ===
Place	Position	Nation	Number	Name	Indian Super League	Total
1	MF		29	Bipin Singh	1	1
1	FW		87	Zequinha	1	1
1	FW		99	Njazi Kuqi	1	1
1	FW		9	Robin Singh	1	1
				TOTALS	4	4
