= List of Bengaluru FC records and statistics =

Bengaluru Football Club is an Indian professional football club based in Bengaluru, Karnataka. The club competes in the top league of Indian football, the Indian Super League. The club was established on 20 July 2013 and began their first competitive season in the I-League a few months later on 22 September 2013. Since their inception, the club has won two I-League titles, including one in their debut season, two Federation Cup titles, one Indian Super League title, a Super Cup, and the Durand Cup championship.

== All time performance record ==
As of 21 February 2026 vs (India) SC Delhi

Competition	MP	W	D	L	GF	GA	GD	Win %
Indian Super League	177	80	38	59	259	211	+48	45%
I-League (Note: Later known as Indian Football League, I-League was the sole top tier of Indian football until the 2016-17 season, after which, Bengaluru transferred to the Indian Super League, which was a joint top tier Indian league until the 2020-21 season.)	78	42	20	16	131	79	+52	54%
Super Cup	17	8	5	4	29	15	+14	47%
Federation Cup	16	9	3	4	27	20	+7	56%
Durand Cup	23	14	9	0	50	25	+25	61%
AFC Champions League (Note: Later known as AFC Champions League Elite)	2	0	0	2	2	4	-2	0%
AFC Cup (Note: Later known as AFC Champions League 2)	50	29	6	15	90	53	+37	58%
Total	363	182	81	100	588	407	181	50%

== Competitions ==
=== Overall ===
As of 2024–25 season

Record	Score	Against		Date	Competition	Season
First match	1–1	(India) McDowell Mohun Bagan		22 September 2013	I-League	2013–14
First win	3–0	(India) Rangdajied United		29 September 2013	I-League	2013–14
First away match	0–2	(India) East Bengal FC		26 October 2013	I-League	2013–14
First loss	0–2	(India) East Bengal FC		26 October 2013	I-League	2013–14
Biggest win	9–1	(Bhutan) Paro FC		12 February 2020	AFC Cup (qualifiers)	2019–20
Biggest home win	9–1	(Bhutan) Paro FC		12 February 2020	AFC Cup (qualifiers)	2019–20
Biggest away win	2–6	(Maldives) Maziya S&RC		24 August 2021	AFC Cup	2021–22
High-scoring draw	3–3					
High-scoring draw	3–3	(India) Royal Wahingdoh FC		3 April 2015	I-League	2014–15
High-scoring draw	3–3	(India) ATK Mohun Bagan		16 December 2021	Indian Super League	2021–22
High-scoring draw	3–3	(India) Punjab FC		30 November 2023	Indian Super League	2023–24
Biggest loss	0–5	(India) McDowell Mohun Bagan		23 April 2016	I-League	2015–16
Biggest away loss	0–5	(India) McDowell Mohun Bagan		23 April 2016	I-League	2015–16
Biggest home loss	0–4	(India) Mumbai City FC		8 December 2023	Indian Super League	2023–24
Biggest home loss	0–4	(India) Mohun Bagan Super Giant		30 March 2024	Indian Super League	2023–24
Season records
Record	Value	Matches	Win %	From	Until	Season
Most wins	27	39	69.23	23 August 2017	16 May 2018	2017–18
Least wins	6 (Note: Tied with 2020–21 season, however the 2023-24 season remains the one with least win % with more matches played.)	28	21.43	18 August 2023	11 April 2024	2023–24
Most draws	10	37	54.05	30 October 2014	31 May 2015	2014–15
Most draws	10	28	21.43	18 August 2023	11 April 2024	2023–24
Most defeats	12	28	21.43	18 August 2023	11 April 2024	2023–24
Least defeats	6	27	50.14	22 September 2013	28 April 2014	2013–14
Least defeats	6	24	50	28 October 2019	8 March 2020	2019–20
Most goals	83	39	69.23	23 August 2017	16 May 2018	2017–18
Least goals	26	28	21.43	18 August 2023	11 April 2024	2023–24
Largest goal difference	+50	39	69.23	23 August 2017	16 May 2018	2017–18
Smallest goal difference	-14	28	21.43	18 August 2023	11 April 2024	2023–24
Most points	86	39	69.23	23 August 2017	16 May 2018	2017–18
Least points	25	21	28.57	22 November 2020	25 February 2021	2020–21

=== I-League ===
Season	Record	Score	Against	Date
2016-17	Biggest win	7–0	DSK Shivajians	22 April 2017
2014-15	Biggest away win	0–4	Royal Wahingdoh FC	31 January 2015
2015-16	Biggest loss	0–5	McDowell Mohun Bagan	23 April 2016
2014-15	Biggest away loss	1–4	McDowell Mohun Bagan	20 February 2015
2014-15	Highest scoring draw	3–3	Royal Wahingdoh FC	3 April 2015

=== Indian Super League ===
Season	Record	Score	Against	Date
2024–25	Biggest home win	5–0	Mumbai City	28 March 2025
2023–24	Biggest home loss	0–4	Mumbai City	8 December 2023
2023–24	Biggest home loss	0–4	Mohun Bagan SG	11 April 2024
2018–19	Biggest away win	0–3	Pune City	22 October 2018
2018–19	Biggest away loss	1–5	Jamshedpur FC	27 February 2019

=== AFC Champions League ===
Season	Record	Score	Against	Date
2014-15	Biggest loss	2–1	(Malaysia) Johor Darul Takzim	4 February 2015

=== AFC Cup ===
Season	Record	Score	Against	Date
2019-20	Biggest win	9–1	(Bhutan) Paro FC	12 February 2020
2016-17	Biggest loss	0–3	(Malaysia) Johor Darul Takzim	11 May 2016

== Players ==
(All current players are in bold. Appearance totals includes substitution appearances.)

=== Appearances ===
- Youngest player (All Competitions): Damaitphang Lyngdoh, 17 years and 190 days (vs Tribuwan Army, 14 April 2021)
- Oldest player (All Competitions): Sunil Chhetri, 41 years and 286 days (vs Chennaiyin, 16 May 2026)
- Most Appearances (All Competitions): Sunil Chhetri, 318
- Most League Appearances: Sunil Chhetri, 235
- Most appearances in ISL Playoffs: Sunil Chhetri and Gurpreet Singh Sandhu, 16
- Most appearances in Super Cup: Sunil Chhetri and Gurpreet Singh Sandhu, 14

=== All competitions appearances ===
#	Name	Appearances
1	(India) **Sunil Chhetri**	318
2	(India) **Gurpreet Singh Sandhu**	215
3	(India) Udanta Singh	201
4	(India) **Suresh Singh Wangjam**	149
5	(India) **Rahul Bheke**	133
6	(India) **Roshan Singh**	128
7	(Spain) Juanan	122
8	(England) John Johnson	118
9	(India) Harmanjot Khabra	109
10	(India) Nishu Kumar	93

== Transfer Records ==
=== Highest transfer fees paid ===
	Name	From	Fee	Year
1	(India) Ashique Kuruniyan	(India) FC Pune City	₹75,00,000	2019
2	(India) Ajith Kumar	(India) Chennai City	₹54,30,000	2020

== See also ==
- List of Bengaluru FC seasons
- List of Bengaluru FC players
- Bengaluru FC Reserves and Academy
