= 2014–15 Indian Federation Cup =

36th edition of the Federation Cup

2014–15 Federation Cup
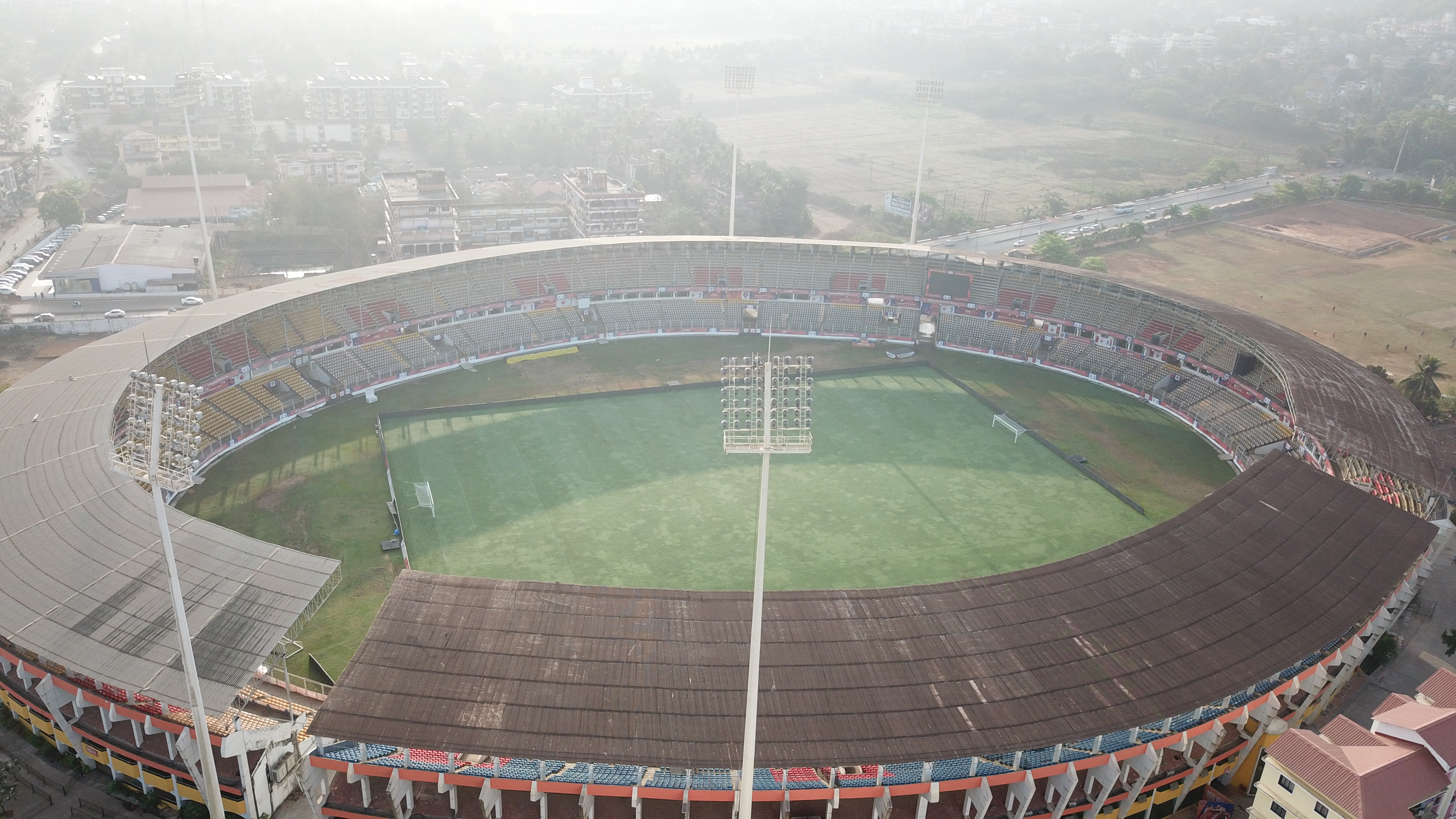
- Fatorda stadium hosted the final on 11 January 2015

Tournament details
- Country: India
- Dates: 28 December 2014 – 11 January 2015
- Teams: 10

Final positions
- Champions: Bengaluru FC (1st title)
- Runners-up: Dempo

Tournament statistics
- Matches played: 23
- Goals scored: 61 (2.65 per match)
- Top goal scorer(s): Sunil Chhetri; Tolgay Özbey (6 goals)

Awards
- Best player: Romeo Fernandes

The 2014–15 Indian Federation Cup (also known as the Hero Federation Cup for sponsorship reasons) was the 36th edition of the Federation Cup, the main national football cup competition in India. Ten of the eleven I-League clubs participated in the tournament the season with Bharat FC being the excluded club.

Churchill Brothers were the reigning champions of the Federation Cup, having won the tournament in 2014, however, due to failing to pass the licensing criteria for the I-League, they were unable to defend their title.

All matches including the semi-final and final were played in Goa.

The final was played between Dempo and Bengaluru FC on 11 January 2015. Bengaluru FC beat Dempo 2–1 to clinch their maiden Federation Cup title.

== Rounds and dates ==
Round	Match date(s)	Number of fixtures	Teams
Group stage	28 December 2014 – 7 January 2015	20	10
Semi-finals	9 January 2015	2	4
Final	11 January 2015	1	2

== Teams ==
On 25 September 2014, it was announced that ten of the eleven I-League clubs would be participating in the Federation Cup, with Bharat FC being the exception. No other teams from other leagues were invited to the tournament.

- Bengaluru FC
- Dempo
- East Bengal
- Mohun Bagan
- Mumbai
- Pune
- Royal Wahingdoh
- Salgaocar
- Shillong Lajong
- Sporting Goa

== Venues ==
The venues for the Federation Cup were also announced on 28 September 2014. Group A matches would be played at the Fatorda Stadium with Group B matches taking place at the Tilak Maidan Stadium. The final and semi-finals would take place at the Fatorda Stadium.

Margao	Vasco
Fatorda Stadium	Tilak Maidan Stadium
Capacity: 24,000	Capacity: 7,000

== Group stage ==
Key to colours in group tables
Top two teams advance to the semi-finals

=== Group A ===
Team	Pld	W	D	L	GF	GA	GD	Pts
Dempo	4	3	1	0	8	2	+6	10
Sporting Goa	4	2	0	2	7	9	−2	6
East Bengal	4	1	1	2	4	5	−1	4
Royal Wahingdoh	4	1	1	2	4	5	−1	4
Mumbai	4	1	1	2	2	4	−2	4

=== Group B ===
Team	Pld	W	D	L	GF	GA	GD	Pts
Bengaluru FC	4	3	1	0	6	3	+3	10
Salgaocar	4	3	0	1	11	6	+5	9
Mohun Bagan	4	1	2	1	3	5	−2	5
Pune	4	1	1	2	6	7	−1	4
Shillong Lajong	4	0	0	4	2	7	−5	0

== Knockout stages ==
=== Bracket ===
Semi-finals
1	Dempo	2
4	Salgaocar	0
3	Bengaluru FC	3
2	Sporting Goa	0

Finals
Dempo	1
Bengaluru FC	2

== Semi-finals ==
9 January 2015
16:00 IST

Dempo	2–0	Salgaocar
Ozbey 12', 58' (pen.)	Report

Fatorda Stadium, Margao
Referee: Pranjal Banerjee
9 January 2015
19:00 IST

Bengaluru FC	3–0	Sporting Goa
Rooney 28'; Chhetri 37'; Lyngdoh 87'	Report

Fatorda Stadium, Margao
Referee: MB Santosh Kumar

== Final ==
11 January 2015
16:00 IST

Dempo	1–2	Bengaluru FC
Ozbey 45+3' (pen.)	Report	Chhetri 10' (pen.); Singh 68'

Fatorda Stadium, Margao
Referee: Pratap Singh

== Goalscorers ==
6 Goals:

- (India) Sunil Chhetri (Bengaluru FC)
- (Australia) Tolgay Özbey (Dempo)

4 Goals:

- (Ivory Coast) Douhou Pierre (Salgaocar)
- (India) Romeo Fernandes (Dempo)

3 Goals:

- (India) Gurjinder Kumar (Salgaocar)
- (India) Jackichand Singh (Royal Wahingdoh)
- (India) Victorino Fernandes (Sporting Goa)

2 Goals:

- (Trinidad and Tobago) Anthony Wolfe (Sporting Goa)
- (Nigeria) Dudu Omagbemi (East Bengal)
- (Cameroon) Pierre Boya (Mohun Bagan)
- (Japan) Ryuji Sueoka (Pune)
- (India) Robin Singh (Bengaluru FC)
- (Australia) Sean Rooney (Bengaluru FC)

1 Goals:

- (India) Anthony D'Souza (Pune)
- (India) Arata Izumi (Pune)
- (Liberia) Bekay Bewar (Royal Wahingdoh)
- (India) Bikash Jairu (Salgaocar)
- (India) Biswajit Saha (Sporting Goa)
- (India) Clifton Dias (Salgaocar)
- (India) Clifford Miranda (Dempo)
- (Scotland) Darryl Duffy (Salgaocar)
- (Liberia) Eric Brown (Pune)
- (India) Eugeneson Lyngdoh (Bengaluru FC)
- (Zambia) Francis Kasonde (Salgaocar)
- (India) Jacob Lalrawngbawla (Shillong Lajong)
- (Brazil) Josimar (Mumbai)
- (India) Kingshuk Debnath (Mohun Bagan)
- (Nigeria) Ranti Martins (East Bengal)
- (India) Sampath Kuttymani (Mumbai)
- (India) Shylo Malsawmtluanga (East Bengal)
- (India) Thongkhosiem Haokip (Pune)

=== Hat-tricks ===
Player	For	Against	Result	Date
(Australia) Tolgay Özbey	Dempo	Sporting Goa	4–1	1 January 2015
(India) Victorino Fernandes	Sporting Goa	East Bengal	4–3	6 January 2015
