= Rino Anto =

Indian footballer (born 1988)

Personal information
- Date of birth: 3 January 1988 (age 38)
- Place of birth: Thrissur, Kerala, India
- Height: 1.74 m (5 ft 9 in)
- Position: Right-back

Youth career
- 2004–2008: Jamshedpur

Senior career*
Years	Team	Apps	(Gls)
2008–2010	Mohun Bagan	20	(1)
2010–2012	Salgaocar	43	(4)
2012	Quartz	17	(8)
2013–2017	Bengaluru	83	(1)
2015	→ Atlético de Kolkata (loan)	13	(0)
2016	→ Kerala Blasters (loan)	3	(0)
2017–2018	Kerala Blasters	13	(0)
2018–2020	Bengaluru	14	(0)
2020–2021	East Bengal	0	(0)
2021–2022	RoundGlass Punjab FC	10	(0)

International career^{‡}
- India U19 & U23 - 9(0)
2015–2016	India	9	(0)
- * Club domestic league appearances and goals as of 11:35, 27 November 2018 (UTC) ‡ National team caps and goals as of 7 June 2016

Rino Anto (born 3 January 1988) is a former Indian professional footballer who played as a right-back.

== Club career ==
=== Early career ===
Born in Thrissur, Kerala, Anto is a product of the Tata Football Academy in Jamshedpur, Jharkhand, where he graduated from in 2008. From 2008 to 2010 Anto played professionally in the I-League with Mohun Bagan before being transferred on 23 February 2010. Then, from 2010 to 2012, Anto played with Salgaocar in the I-League, scoring once against East Bengal at the Fatorda Stadium in a league match on 19 May 2011 in which he found the net in the 33rd minute as Salgaocar won 3–2.

=== Quartz and Mohun Bagan ===
After playing two seasons with Salgaocar in the I-League, Anto signed for Quartz of the I-League 2nd Division in their search for promotion to the I-League. Anto joined the Kerala football team that played in the 2013 Santosh Trophy in which he reached the final before losing to Services football team 3–4 on penalties.

Then on 5 June 2013 it was reported that Anto, along with Wahid Sali, had signed with Mohun Bagan and thus return to the I-League for the 2013–14 season. However, on 24 June 2013, it was reported that Anto had been released from Mohun Bagan, less than 20 days after signing with the club on his second spell as the club could not afford his salary. He made no appearances with the club.

=== Bengaluru FC ===
Then, on 20 July 2013, it was announced during a mega-electric gala at the Bangalore Football Stadium that Anto was a part of the new direct-entry club Bengaluru FC squad, which would participate in the 2013–14 I-League. He made his debut for Bengaluru in the club's first ever I-League match on 22 September 2013 against Mohun Bagan at the Bangalore Football Stadium, in which he came on as a substitute for Keegan Pereira in the 71st minute as Bengaluru drew the match 1–1. In his debut season with the club, he won the I-League, as the club was declared winner after defeating Dempo.

The 2015 season started well for Anto, as Bengaluru FC reached the finals of Federation Cup by defeating Sporting Clube de Goa three goals to nil in the semifinal. Bengaluru won the final 2–1, as they won their maiden Federation Cup title. Anto also featured in the AFC Champions League qualifying match against Johor Darul Ta'zim. Rino signed a 2-year extension to his contract with Bengaluru which would keep him at the club until the end of the 2016–17 season.

Anto played his final match for Bengaluru on 31 May 2017 in an AFC Cup match against Maziya S&RC. He came on as an 87th-minute substitute for Sunil Chhetri as Bengaluru won 1–0.

=== Kerala Blasters ===
On 23 July 2017, Anto was selected in the 3rd round of the 2017–18 ISL Players Draft by the Kerala Blasters for the 2017–18 Indian Super League. He made his debut for the club on 17 November 2017 against ATK. He started the match and helped the Blasters hold a 0–0 draw.

=== Return to Bengaluru FC ===
After 2017–18 season, Anto parted ways with Kerala Blasters and joined his former club, Bengaluru FC. BFC had the service of Khabra at right back. Anto would add quality to the BFC defence.

=== East Bengal ===
After 2019–20 season, Anto parted ways with Bengaluru. He joined East Bengal. It was his second stint with a Kolkata based club, first being with Mohun Bagan. East Bengal Football Club had the services of Samad Ali Mallick, Anto would strengthen the right-back position.

ROUNDGLASS PUNJAB---

2021-22 SIGNED FOR ROUNDGLASS

== International career ==
On 25 February 2015, new Indian coach Stephen Constantine included Anto in the shortlist of 32 players for World Cup qualifier match against Nepal. However, due to his injury, he failed to make it into the shortlist of 26 players when Constantine declared in early March.

Rino made his national team debut on 11 June 2015 against Oman in a Group D game of the 2018 World Cup qualifier in a 1–2 loss at home in Bengaluru.

== Career statistics ==
As of 21 January 2018

Club	Season	League			Federation Cup		Durand Cup		AFC		Total	
Club	Season	Division	Apps	Goals	Apps	Goals	Apps	Goals	Apps	Goals	Apps	Goals
Quartz	2012	I-League 2nd Division	0	0	0	0	0	0	—	—	0	0
Bengaluru FC	2013–14	I-League	23	0	3	0	0	0	—	—	26	0
Bengaluru FC	2014–15	I-League	18	1	6	0	0	0	6	0	30	1
Bengaluru FC	2015–16	I-League	16	0	2	0	0	0	6	0	24	0
Atlético Kolkata (loan)	2015	Indian Super League	13	0	—	—	—	—	—	—	13	0
Kerala Blasters (loan)	2016	Indian Super League	3	0	—	—	—	—	—	–	3	0
Kerala Blasters	2017–18	Indian Super League	10	0	—	—	—	—	—	–	10	0
Career total			83	1	11	0	0	0	12	0	101	1

== Honours ==
=== Club ===
Tata Football Academy

- National Football League II: 2006

U-19 Nationals champion- Jharkhand :2005

Mohun Bagan

- Calcutta Football League
- Hero Super Cup:
- Federation cup: 2009–10

Salagaocar

- I-League: 2010–11
- Federation Cup: 2011–12
- Goa premier league

Bengaluru FC

- I-League (2): 2013–14, 2015—16
- Federation Cup (2): 2014–15, 2016-17
- Indian Super League: 2018–19
- AFC Cup: runner-up 2016

Kerala Blasters

- Indian Super League runner-up: 2016

Kerala

- Santosh Trophy: runner-up 2012–13
