= Ratheesh Kumar =

Indian playback singer

Ratheesh Kumar is an Indian playback singer from Kerala. He started his career as a playback singer in the Malayalam movie Ivar Vivahitharayal in 2009. He has also recorded songs for Malayalam Albums and Dramas. He was the finalist of the reality show Amrita TV Super Star Global, a musical talent hunt show hosted by Amrita TV.

== Personal life ==
Ratheesh was born to a mid-class Nambiar family from Kannur, Kerala on 14 November 1982. He started learning Carnatic music at the age of 8 under Smt.Ranjini, Smt.Anitha Sunanda, Azheekodu Gopinathan, Cherthala Santhosh Kumar and Thalasseri Balan Master.

== Career ==
Ratheesh Kumar solod as a playback singer in 2009 with the song "Paazhmulam Thandil Oru Paathiraa Paattil" in Saji Surendran's Malayalam film Ivar Vivahitharayal under music director M. Jayachandran.

=== Reality shows ===
- 2007 - Amrita TV Super Star Global Finalist.
- 2006 - Surya TV Swaramanjari.
- 2006 - Kairali TV Gandharvasangeetham.
- 2005 - Doordarshan Raagalayam.
