= Lalrozama Fanai =

Indian footballer (born 1991)

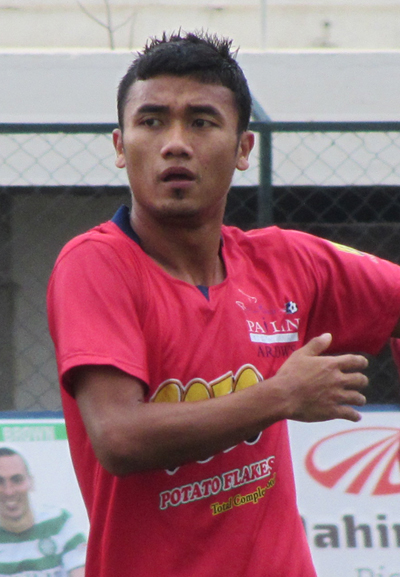

Personal information
- Date of birth: 30 November 1991 (age 34)
- Place of birth: Aizawl, Mizoram, India
- Height: 1.75 m (5 ft 9 in)
- Position: Defender

Team information
- Current team: East Bengal

Youth career
- 2003–2004: Bawngkawn
- 2005–2007: Mohun Bagan
- 2007–2010: Pune

Senior career*
Years	Team	Apps	(Gls)
2010–2012	Pailan Arrows		
2012–2013	Mohun Bagan	4	(0)
2013–2014	Bengaluru FC	3	(0)
2015	Aizawl F.C.		
2016–17	Fateh Hyderabad		
2017–18	Aizawl F. C.	3	(0)
2018–	East Bengal	2	(0)

International career^{‡}
2009–2010	India U19		
2010	India U23	1	
- * Club domestic league appearances and goals as of 2 March 2018 ‡ National team caps and goals as of 15 August 2013

Lalrozama Fanai (born 30 November 1991) is a former Indian professional footballer who most recently played as a defender for East Bengal FC in the I-League.

He is currently an AFC 'C' licensed, working with Kerala United FC.

== Career ==
=== Youth ===
Born in Aizawl, Mizoram, Fanai started playing football as a school-team player before joining Mizo club, Bawngkawn, where he played in the local leagues till 2004. In 2005, Fanai joined the Mohun Bagan-SAIL Academy where he stayed till 2007. While with the Mohun Bagan Academy, Fanai was a part of the side that won the Indian zone of the Manchester United Premier Cup before qualifying for the final rounds in Manchester.

In 2007, Fanai signed for Pune in which he was a youth player for them from 2007 to 2010.

=== Pailan Arrows ===
In 2010, Fanai signed with newly created Pailan Arrows (then AIFF XI) of the I-League. On 3 December 2010 Fanai played in his first professional match in the league against Chirag United which was also the first league match Pailan Arrows history as the club lost 2–1.

On 23 October 2011 Fanai scored a goal against Mohun Bagan in a league match at the Salt Lake Stadium in which he found the net in the 8th minute to give his side the lead before losing 3–1.

=== Mohun Bagan ===
For the 2012–13 season Fanai signed with Mohun Bagan, the club he spent some of his youth days with. Fanai made his debut for Mohun Bagan in the league on 6 October 2012 against Shillong Lajong on the first match of the season in which he started and played the full 90 minutes as Lajong won the match 2–0.

=== Bengaluru FC ===
For the 2013–14 season it was announced that Fanai had signed with new direct-entry side Bengaluru FC. He made his debut for the team on 1 December 2013 in the I-League against Shillong Lajong at the Bangalore Football Stadium. He came on in the 24th minute for Keegan Pereira as Bengaluru FC won the match 2–1.

=== Aizawl ===
After leaving Bengaluru FC, Fanai joined I-League 2nd Division side Aizawl. After the side gained promotion to the I-League, it was announced that Fanai would not be re-signed by the club.

=== Fateh Hyderabad ===
Fanai played for Fateh Hyderabad A.F.C. in 2016–17 I-League 2nd Division.

=== Aizawl ===
He was signed by Aizawl F.C. for 2017–18 I-League.

== International ==
During the 2007–08 season, Fanai was called up to the India U19 side but he did not have a passport at the time so he could not play for the side. Fanai's first U19 tournament was the 2010 AFC U-19 qualifiers in Iraq.

He also played with the India U23 side during the 2010 Asian Games in which he played in one match.

== Career statistics ==
As of 22 December 2013

Club	Season	League		Federation Cup		Durand Cup		AFC		Total	
Club	Season	Apps	Goals	Apps	Goals	Apps	Goals	Apps	Goals	Apps	Goals
Mohun Bagan	2012–13	4	0	2	0	0	0	—	—	6	0
Bengaluru FC	2013–14	3	0	0	0	0	0	—	—	3	0
Aizawl FC	2015–16	0	0	0	0	0	0	—	—	0	0
Fateh Hyderabad	2016–17	0	0	0	0	0	0	—	—	0	0
Career total		7	0	2	0	0	0	0	0	9	0
