= Rowan Arumughan =

Indian football referee (born 1979)

- Born: 7 September 1979 (age 47); Parayankad, Kerala, India

Domestic
Years	League	Role

International
Years	League	Role
2009–	FIFA listed	Referee

Rowan Arumughan (born 7 September 1979) is an Indian professional football referee who officiates primarily in the I-League and Indian Super League. He has also officiated in FIFA matches.
