= Karan Sawhney =

Indian footballer (born 1992)

Personal information
- Full name: Karan Atul Sawhney
- Date of birth: 23 March 1992 (age 34)
- Place of birth: Mumbai, Maharashtra, India
- Height: 1.84 m (6 ft 1/2 in)
- Position: Striker

Youth career
- Mahindra United
- PIFA
- Tata FA

Senior career*
Years	Team	Apps	(Gls)
2012–2013	Salgaocar	0	(0)
2013	→ DSK Shivajians (loan)		
2013–2015	Bengaluru FC	3	(0)
2016–2017	Mumbai	13	(3)
2017–2018	Kerala Blasters	4	(0)
- * Club domestic league appearances and goals as of 22:35, 31 January 2018 (UTC)

Karan Atul Sawhney (born 23 March 1992) is an Indian professional footballer who last played as a striker for Kerala Blasters.

== Career ==
=== Early career ===
Born in Mumbai, Maharashtra, Sawhney started his career in the youth set-up of Mahindra United, for which he was a part of the under-15 and under-19 teams. He then moved on to the youth set-up of PIFA where his most memorable moment was when he scored against the Inter Milan Academy side in the 2009 Gauteng Future Champions tournament. After his time at PIFA, Sawhney joined the Tata Football Academy where he graduated in 2012.

=== Salgaocar ===
On 7 June 2012 it was confirmed that Sawhney had signed for Salgaocar of the I-League. Then in 2013 it was confirmed that Sawhney had been loaned out to DSK Shivajians F.C. for their I-League 2nd Division campaign.

=== Bengaluru FC ===
On 20 July 2013 it was announced that Sawhney has signed for Bengaluru FC for the 2013–14 I-League campaign. He then made his professional debut for the team on 6 December 2013 against Churchill Brothers at the Duler Stadium. He came on as an 85th-minute substitute for Sunil Chhetri as Bengaluru FC went on to win the match 3–1.

=== Mumbai ===
On 6 January 2016 it was announced that Sawhney had signed with Mumbai.

=== Kerala Blasters ===
On 23 July 2017, Sawhney was selected in the 14th round of the 2017–18 ISL Players Draft by the Kerala Blasters for the 2017–18 Indian Super League. He made his debut for the club on 9 December 2017 against Goa. He came on as a 62nd-minute substitute for Loken Meitei as Kerala Blasters lost 5–2.

== Career statistics ==
As of 31 January 2018

Club	Season	League			Cup		Continental		Total	
Club	Season	Division	Apps	Goals	Apps	Goals	Apps	Goals	Apps	Goals
Bengaluru	2013–14	I-League	3	0	0	0	—	—	3	0
Mumbai	2016–17	I-League	13	3	0	0	—	—	13	3
Kerala Blasters	2017–18	ISL	3	0	—	—	—	—	3	0
Career total			19	3	0	0	0	0	19	3
