= Sampath Kuttymani =

Indian footballer (born 1986)

Personal information
- Full name: Sampath Kumar Kuttymani
- Date of birth: 28 September 1986 (age 40)
- Place of birth: Bangalore, Karnataka, India
- Height: 1.85 m (6 ft 1 in)
- Position: Midfielder

Team information
- Current team: Kenkre Mumbai

Youth career
- 2002–2004: ITI Bengaluru
- 2004–2005: Fransa-Pax
- 2005–2007: HAL

Senior career*
Years	Team	Apps	(Gls)
2007	HAL		
2007–2009	Mumbai		
2009–2010	Pune		
2010–2013	Mumbai	10	(0)
2013–2014	Bengaluru FC	0	(0)
2014–2015	Mumbai	15	(2)
2016	DSK Shivajians	3	(0)
2017–	Kenkre		(3)

International career^{‡}
2006–2008	India	3	(0)
- * Club domestic league appearances and goals as of 28 May 2017 ‡ National team caps and goals as of 20 August 2013

Sampath Kumar Kuttymani (born 28 September 1986) is an Indian professional footballer who plays as a midfielder for Kenkre in the I-League 2nd Division.

== Career ==
=== Early career ===
Born in Bangalore, Karnataka, Kuttymani started his professional career with HAL SC in the National Football League. He then went on to play for Mumbai F.C. twice and Pune F.C. in between.

=== Bengaluru FC ===
In July 2013 it was confirmed that Kuttymani had signed with new direct-entry I-League side Bengaluru FC for the 2013–14 season.

=== Mumbai ===
In December 2014, Sampath signed for Mumbai F.C.

== International ==
Kuttymani has represented India three times from 2006 to 2008.

== Honours ==
India

- SAFF Championship runner-up: 2008
