= Vishal Kumar =

Indian footballer (born 1992)

R. Vishal Kumar
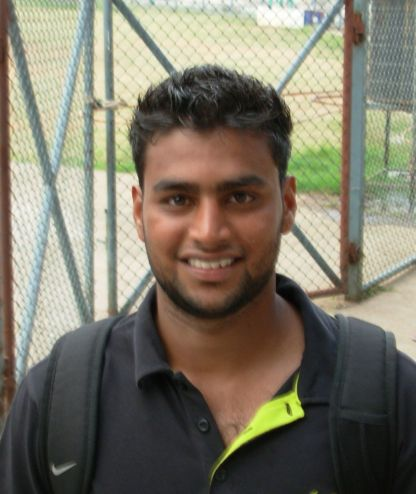

Personal information
- Full name: R. Vishal Kumar
- Date of birth: 30 July 1992 (age 34)
- Place of birth: Bangalore, Karnataka, India
- Position: Right back

Team information
- Current team: Minerva Punjab

Youth career
- Karnataka

Senior career*
Years	Team	Apps	(Gls)
2010	HAL		
2010–2013	Pailan Arrows	32	(0)
2013–2016	Bengaluru FC	13	(0)
2013–2016	Minerva Punjab	0	(0)

International career^{‡}
- India U16
- India U19
2011–	India U23	4	(0)
- * Club domestic league appearances and goals as of 10:40, 14 May 2015 (UTC) ‡ National team caps and goals as of 15 August 2013

R. Vishal Kumar (born 30 July 1992) is an Indian professional footballer who plays as a right back for Minerva Punjab in the I-League.

== Club career ==
=== Early career ===
Born in Bangalore, Karnataka, it was in 2005 that football captured Vishal's imagination. The 8th standard student's enthusiasm caught the attention of Sports Authority of India coach Mary Victoria, who asked him to attend the beginners' camp at Nandan ground in Austin Town.

Later, she introduced him to veteran coach Dada Peer, who was in charge of the Department of Youth Services and Sports-run Sports School at Vidyanagar. "I failed in the selection trials. But Dada Peer Sir believed in my skills and ability and admitted me to the school," said Vishal.

During his term in Department of Youth Services and Sports-run Sports School, he failed to impress State coaches during the trials for Under-16 team. "I could not get a look in when I was in ninth standard. But I was not ready to give up. I attended the trials next year and won my place," he said.

The 29th edition of the sub-junior national championship for Mir Iqbal Hussain Trophy transformed his life forever. Karnataka's campaign ended in the semifinals, but the left wing back's career graph began to rise and he landed at the National camp in Gujarat.

A couple of days before the camp concluded, Vishal was forced to return to Bangalore with a broken left forearm, which he sustained during the late stages of a match while attempting a bicycle kick. "I was shattered as I could not complete the camp. I had almost put my national aspirations to rest. But I was surprised when the team's technical director Colm Toal took me into the national squad, even as I was recovering from the injury. It was a dream come true for me," said Vishal.

He represented Karnataka at the national level as the state's only player selected for the Indian probable squad for the Olympic qualifiers against Qatar. He was also a member of the Indian Arrows, a team established to develop young Indian football talent ahead of the 2018 World Cup qualification.

From then on, he was a regular in the India national under-16 football team and India national under-19 football team national squads and he figured in the 2012 AFC U-19 Championship qualification preliminary round matches in Saudi Arabia and the final round in Uzbekistan. He also traveled to Germany, England, USA, and Bhutan on various exposure-cum-competition trips.

=== Indian Arrows ===
After playing a few matches for HAL Bangalore in the I-League 2nd Division, Vishal was selected to join the newly created Pailan Arrows (then AIFF XI) of the I-League, a team made up of entirely U21 players. On 3 December 2010, he made his I-League debut against United SC, which was also the AIFF XI's first ever I-League match as well, at the Salt Lake Stadium in Kolkata in which he started as the AIFF XI went down 2–1. He appeared in 17 league matches in the first season.

=== Bengaluru FC ===
After spending three seasons with the Pailan Arrows, Vishal signed with new direct-entry side Bengaluru FC for the 2013–14 season. He made his debut for the side in the club's I-League opener against Mohun Bagan A.C. on 22 September 2013 in which he started and played the full match as Bengaluru drew the match 1–1. The first goal scored by Bengaluru FC was by an assist from Vishal. He was released by the club in November 2016.

== International ==
Vishal has represented India at the U16, U19, and U23 levels.

== Career statistics ==
As of 14 May 2015

Club	Season	League		Federation Cup		Durand Cup		AFC		Total	
Club	Season	Apps	Goals	Apps	Goals	Apps	Goals	Apps	Goals	Apps	Goals
Indian Arrows	2010–11	17	-	-	-	-	-	-	-	17	-
Indian Arrows	2011–12	-	-	-	-	-	-	-	-	-	-
Indian Arrows	2012–13	15	-	1	-	-	-	-	-	16	-
Total	32	-	1	-	-	-	-	-	33	-	
Bengaluru FC	2013–14	11	-	1	-	-	-	-	-	12	-
Bengaluru FC	2014–15	2	-	-	-	-	-	1	-	3	-
Bengaluru FC	2015–16	-	-	-	-	-	-	2	-	2	-
Bengaluru FC	Total	13	-	1	-	-	-	3	-	17	-
Career total		45	-	2	-	-	-	1	-	48	-

== Awards ==
Year	Award-giving body	Award	Result
2014	Government of Karnataka	Ekalavya Award	Won
