= Beikhokhei Beingaichho =

Indian footballer (born 1990)

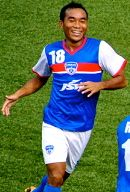

Personal information
- Date of birth: 15 August 1990 (age 36)
- Place of birth: Siaha, Mizoram, India
- Height: 1.64 m (5 ft 4 1/2 in)
- Positions: Attacking midfielder; winger

Team information
- Current team: Minerva Punjab
- Number: 18

Youth career
- 2005–2008: IFA Academy, Haldia (WB)

Senior career*
Years	Team	Apps	(Gls)
2008	George Telegraph	32	(12)
2009–2013	East Bengal	56	(14)
2011	→ United Sikkim (loan)	32	(16)
2013–2017	Bengaluru FC	52	(12)
2017–2018	Mohun Bagan	14	(2)
2019–	Minerva Punjab	10	(0)
- * Club domestic league appearances and goals as of 13:24, 11 October 2019 (UTC)

Beikhokhei Beingaichho (born 15 August 1990) is an Indian footballer who plays primarily as a midfielder/right winger for Minerva Punjab in the I-League.

== Career ==
=== Early career ===
Born in Siaha, Mizoram, Beikhokhei Beingaichho graduated from the Indian Football Academy Haldia in 2008.

Beingaichho won the Indian Football Association (West Bengal) U-19 Player of the Year on 12 November 2009 while playing for George Telegraph. After winning the award, Beingaichho signed for East Bengal of the I-League. He scored his first goal for East Bengal in the AFC Cup on 20 April 2010 against Al-Ittihad, in which he scored in the 85th minute as East Bengal lost the match 2–1. He became the youngest to score in AFC campaign. He then scored his first two I-League goals on 4 May 2010 against Chirag United, in which he scored in both the 40th and 67th minutes of the match to help East Bengal to a 2–1 victory, saving East Bengal from relegation.

In 2011, Beingaichho was sent on loan to United Sikkim for the 2011 I-League 2nd Division. He sustained a knee injury with a broken patella.

In 2012, he signed for Aizawl FC on loan from United Sikkim for their 2nd Division I-League campaign. He spent most of his time on the bench due to an injury.

=== Bengaluru FC ===
After not playing at all during the 2012–13 I-League season because of injury, Beingaichho signed for new direct-entry I-League club Bengaluru FC for the 2013–14 season. He then made his debut for Bengaluru FC in the I-League against Mohun Bagan AC on 22 September 2013 in which he started and played 46 minutes before being replaced by Sunil Chhetri as his side went on to draw 1–1. He scored his first goal for the team on 26 November 2013 against Salgaocar, in which his 57th-minute strike turned out to be the winning goal in Bengaluru FC's first ever away victory in their history. He had the highest number of assists in the league, earning a reputation as an Indian Mesut Ozil.

Then, in Bengaluru FC's first ever Federation Cup match against Sporting Goa, Beingaichho scored a brace as Bengaluru FC won 5–3.

He made multiple appearances at the Asian Confederation Cup with both East Bengal and Bengaluru FC, winning a Silver Medal in the AFC Cup in 2017 for Bengaluru FC .

=== Mohun Bagan ===
He was one of the players most in demand in the ISL draft. After remaining unsigned in the 2017–18 ISL Players Draft due to a knee operation, Beingaichho signed up for I-League club Mohun Bagan. He won the Governor Gold Cup and was a semi finalist in the Federation Cup.

=== Minerva Punjab ===
Following a transfer to Minerva Punjab on August 13, 2019, he planned to play in I-League in the 2019–20 season.

== Career statistics ==
As of 13 February 2016

Club	Season	League			Federation Cup		Durand Cup		AFC		Total	
Club	Season	Division	Apps	Goals	Apps	Goals	Apps	Goals	Apps	Goals	Apps	Goals
Bengaluru FC	2013–14	I-League	22	2	3	2	—	—	—	—	25	4
Bengaluru FC	2014–15	I-League	13	2	5	3	3	0	5	1	26	6
Bengaluru FC	2015–16	I-League	8	0	4	0	0	0	4	2	16	0
Career total			43	4	12	5	3	0	9	3	67	10
