= Pawan Kumar (footballer, born 1990) =

Indian footballer (born 1990)

Personal information
- Date of birth: 1 July 1990 (age 36)
- Place of birth: Gurdaspur, Punjab, India
- Height: 1.82 m (5 ft 11 1/2 in)
- Position: Goalkeeper

Team information
- Current team: Delhi
- Number: 1

Youth career
- JCT

Senior career*
Years	Team	Apps	(Gls)
2010–2011	JCT		
2011–2012	Air India		
2012–2013	Salgaocar		
2013–2015	Bengaluru	20	(0)
2015–2017	Chennaiyin		
2016	→ Mumbai (loan)	12	(0)
2017	→ Mohan Bagan (loan)		
2018–2020	NorthEast United	18	(0)
2020–2022	Jamshedpur	4	(0)
2022–2023	East Bengal		
2023–	Delhi		
- * Club domestic league appearances and goals

Pawan Kumar (born 1 July 1990) is an Indian professional footballer who plays as a goalkeeper for I-League club Delhi.

== Career ==
=== Youth and early career ===
Born in Gurdaspur, Punjab, Kumar has played with several I-League clubs like JCT, Air India, and Salgaocar. While with JCT, Kumar led the side to the 2010 Durand Cup final where his side lost 1–0 to Chirag United at the Ambedkar Stadium. Also while with the club, Kumar was one of five players sent to England to train with the Wolverhampton Wanderers Academy for a week as part of a partnership Wolves had with JCT. Then, for the 2011–2012 season, after JCT disbanded, Kumar played with Air India, another I-League, side for the season.

Then, for the 2012–13 season, Kumar played with Salgaocar where he found himself as the #2 behind Karanjit Singh. Kumar only played in one match while with the club against Sporting Goa on 20 March 2013 in which he came on as a 63rd-minute substitute after Karanjit Singh was red carded; Salgaocar lost the match 1–3.

=== Bengaluru FC ===
On 21 July 2013, during the launch of new direct-entry I-League club, Bengaluru FC, Kumar was announced as one of the players signed on to the club for the new season. Kumar then made his debut for Bengaluru in the club's very first I-League match ever against Mohun Bagan A.C. at the Bangalore Football Stadium in which he started and played the full match as the match ended 1–1.

=== Mumbai ===
In December 2015, Pawan joined Mumbai F.C. for 2015–16 I-League.

== Career statistics ==
=== Club ===
As of 11 January 2022

Club	Season	League			Cup		AFC		Total	
Club	Season	Division	Apps	Goals	Apps	Goals	Apps	Goals	Apps	Goals
Salgaocar	2012–13	I-League	1	0	0	0	—		1	0
Bengaluru	2013–14	I-League	20	0	0	0	—		20	0
Chennaiyin	2015	Indian Super League	0	0	0	0	—		0	0
Mumbai (loan)	2015–16	I-League	12	0	0	0	—		12	0
Mohun Bagan (loan)	2016–17	I-League	0	0	0	0	1 (Note: Appearance(s) in AFC Cup)	0	1	0
Chennaiyin	2017–18	Indian Super League	1	0	0	0	—		1	0
NorthEast United	2018–19	Indian Super League	16	0	0	0	—		16	0
NorthEast United	2019–20	Indian Super League	2	0	0	0	—		2	0
NorthEast United	Total		18	0	0	0	—		18	0
Jamshedpur	2020–21	Indian Super League	2	0	0	0	—		2	0
Jamshedpur	2021–22	Indian Super League	2	0	0	0	—		2	0
East Bengal	2022–23	Indian Super League	0	0	0	0	—		0	0
Career total			56	0	0	0	1	0	57	0

== Honours ==
Chennaiyin

- Indian Super League: 2015
- Indian Super League: 2017–18
