= Bruno Colaço =

Indian footballer

Personal information
- Date of birth: 11 October 1991 (age 35)
- Place of birth: Goa, India
- Position: Goalkeeper

Team information
- Current team: Goa
- Number: 1

Youth career
- SESA Football Academy
- 2012: Margao

Senior career*
| Years | Team | Apps | (Gls) |
| 2013 | Sporting Goa | 11 | (0) |
| 2013–2014 | Bengaluru FC | 2 | (0) |
| 2014–2015 | Dempo SC | 0 | (0) |
| 2017– | Goa | 0 | (0) |
- * Club domestic league appearances and goals as of 28 July 2017

Bruno Colaço (born 11 October 1991) is an Indian professional footballer who plays as a goalkeeper for Goa.

== Career ==
=== Sporting Goa ===
Colaço began his career with SESA Football Academy until 2012 when he played for Margao Sports Club in the Goa Professional League. He then signed for Sporting Clube de Goa of the I-League and made his debut for the club on 20 January 2013 against Pune F.C. at the Balewadi Sports Complex in which he helped Sporting Goa maintain a clean-sheet as the club drew the match 0–0.

=== Bengaluru FC ===
After spending half a season with Sporting Clube de Goa, Colaço signed with new direct-entry club Bengaluru FC for the 2013–14 season. He made his debut with the club in the I-League on 2 November 2013 against Mumbai F.C. at the Balewadi Sports Complex in which he played the full match as Bengaluru FC drew the match 2–2.

== Career statistics ==
As of 8 January 2017

| Club | Season | League | | | Federation Cup | | Durand Cup | | AFC | | Total | |
| Club | Season | Division | Apps | Goals | Apps | Goals | Apps | Goals | Apps | Goals | Apps | Goals |
|---|---|---|---|---|---|---|---|---|---|---|---|---|
| Sporting Goa | 2012–13 | I-League | 11 | 0 | 0 | 0 | 0 | 0 | — | — | 11 | 0 |
| Bengaluru FC | 2013–14 | I-League | 2 | 0 | 0 | 0 | 0 | 0 | — | — | 2 | 0 |
| Dempo | 2014–15 | I-League | 0 | 0 | 1 | 0 | 0 | 0 | — | — | 0 | 0 |
| Career total | | | 13 | 0 | 1 | 0 | 0 | 0 | 0 | 0 | 14 | 0 |
