= John Johnson (footballer) =

English footballer (born 1988)

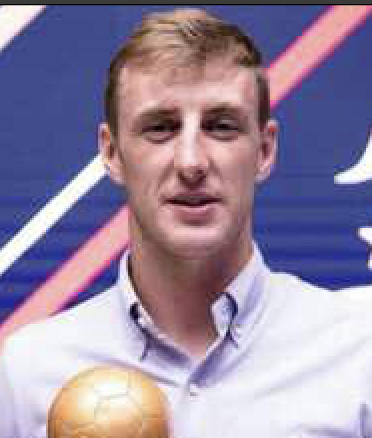
- Johnson with his new club Bengaluru FC in 2013

Personal information
- Full name: John James Johnson
- Date of birth: 16 September 1988 (age 38)
- Place of birth: Middlesbrough, England
- Height: 6 ft 0 in (1.83 m)
- Position: Centre-back

Youth career
- 2005–2008: Middlesbrough

Senior career*
Years	Team	Apps	(Gls)
2008–2010	Middlesbrough	1	(0)
2008-2009	→ Tranmere Rovers (loan)	4	(0)
2009–2010	→ Northampton Town (loan)	36	(5)
2010–2013	Northampton Town	103	(8)
2013–2018	Bengaluru	86	(4)
2018–2020	ATK	18	(1)
2020–2021	Mohun Bagan		
2021–2022	RoundGlass Punjab		
- * Club domestic league appearances and goals

John James Johnson (born 16 September 1988) is an English footballer who plays as a defender. A graduate of the Middlesbrough youth academy, he made his debut for the club against Chelsea. A lack of first team opportunities saw him being loaned to Football League clubs Tranmere Rovers and Northampton Town.

After playing for 83 seasons on loan, Northampton signed Johnson on a permanent basis. He was also given club captainship but was replaced in the role after the arrival of Clarke Carlisle. In the 2012–13 season, his appearances for the club were hindered due to a cartilage injury. Johnson then signed for debutant Bengaluru FC in the I-League in India, managed by his former Northampton Town teammate Ashley Westwood. Johnson, along with Kenyan Curtis Osano, became the first foreigners to play for the club. Despite being an English player, he has spent the majority of his professional career playing for Indian clubs such as Bengaluru FC and ATK, in the I-League and Indian Super League.

== Career ==
=== Middlesbrough ===
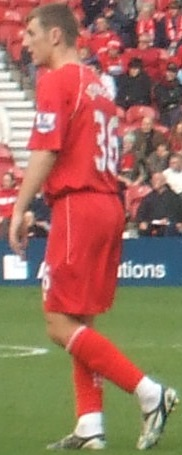
Johnson playing for Middlesbrough in 2008

Born in Middlesbrough, North Yorkshire, Johnson is a product of the Middlesbrough academy which he joined in 2005. He signed a professional contract with Middlesbrough on 15 May 2008 and made his first team debut (and only appearance for the club) on 18 October 2008 in a 5–0 home defeat to Chelsea in the Premier League, coming on as a substitute for Jonathan Grounds in the 54th minute. Later, in an interview in May 2015, Johnson said that his debut had been the "worst moment" of his life. In November 2008, he made a loan move to League One side Tranmere Rovers until the end of the year. He made his debut in a 2–1 victory against Leeds United the following week, but scored an own goal in Tranmere's Football League Trophy northern area semi-final against Scunthorpe United, which gave Scunthorpe a 2–1 victory. He played five games, four in the league, during his loan spell with Tranmere.

=== Northampton Town ===
Johnson joined League Two club Northampton Town on a one-month loan in September 2009. He made his debut for the club in a 3–0 loss against Shrewsbury Town and on 3 October 2009, scored the first goal of his professional career, in a 2–2 draw against Bradford City. Having played four games, Johnson said he hoped to help the club back to winning ways. On 22 October 2009, he extended his stay at Northampton until the new year, and scored his first goal on 24 October 2009 in a 4–2 win over Morecambe. The loan was extended until the end of the season in December.

Northampton signed Johnson on a two-year contract in July 2010 following the successful loan spell. After signing for the club on a permanent basis, Johnson's first match was the opening game of the season, in a 3–0 loss against Torquay United. Two months later, he received a straight red card after fouling Simon Clist and lost his appeal, resulting in a one-match ban, missing a 3–1 loss against Oxford United. A week after his suspension, he scored his first goal as a permanent Northampton player in a 2–0 win over Lincoln City. In his first season at Northampton (as a permanent player), he made 41 appearances and scored seven goals.

Johnson was appointed as captain ahead of the 2011–12 season having previously captained the club in a friendly match against Nottingham Forest, but was stripped of the post following the arrival of Clarke Carlisle. Johnson retained his first team place, making 48 appearances and scoring twice in two consecutive games against Morecambe and Southend. During a 3–2 loss against Burton Albion on 26 December 2011, Johnson received a straight red card in the 18th minute, for fouling John McGrath. After the match, the club announced it would appeal against his sending-off. The clerk won the appeal after The Football Association overturned the decision, therefore making him available to play.

As his contract was due to expire in the summer, Johnson signed a one-year extension with Northampton keeping him at the club until 2013 on 16 May 2012. After signing, manager Aidy Boothroyd said he expected Johnson to realise his full potential in the coming season. However, Johnson suffered a cartilage injury in October 2012 that ruled him out for four to six weeks. He made a return in a 1–1 draw against York City, but his return was short-lived when he came off at half-time and was out until January after undergoing knee surgery. After making his return on 19 January 2013 against AFC Wimbledon in a 1–1 draw, Boothroyd said Johnson made the team tastier and more aggressive. Later in the 2012–13 season, Johnson regained his first team place and the club finished in sixth place, qualifying for the promotion play-offs. Johnson described the team as "the strongest" he had played in. Johnson was an unused substitute in the play-offs as Northampton Town lost 3–0 on aggregate against Bradford City. He was released by Northampton at the end of the season.

=== Bengaluru FC ===
On 16 July 2013, Johnson signed for Bengaluru FC of the Indian I-League, and with Curtis Osano, became the first foreigners in the team's history. He made his debut in their first ever I-League match on 22 September against Mohun Bagan, playing the entirety of a 1–1 draw. In their next match against Rangdajied United F.C., he scored his first goal in India, opening a 3–0 victory. He scored his second goal in as many matches on 6 October against United S.C., the only goal of the game. Four days later he netted in his third consecutive match, in the 12th minute of a 2–1 victory against Mohammedan S.C. In the Federation Cup, Johnson played three full matches against Sporting Goa, Rangdajied United and East Bengal. However, Bengaluru could not proceed beyond the group stage. After defeating Dempo on 20 April 2014, the club won the I-League in its debut season. He was also awarded the Best Defender of 2013–14 I-League award.

Johnson kicked off the 2015 season by winning the Federation Cup, defeating Dempo 2–1 in the final. He played in the club's 2–1 defeat against Malaysian club Johor Darul Ta'zim in the preliminary round of 2015 AFC Champions League, receiving a yellow card in the 67th minute.

On 20 June 2016, after helping Bengaluru FC win their second I-League title, Johnson was rewarded with a new two-year contract, keeping him with the club till the end of the 2017–18 season.

=== ATK FC ===
On 4 June 2018, it was announced on Twitter that Johnson had joined ATK on a two-year deal.

=== ATK Mohun Bagan ===
After the merger of ATK and Mohun Bagan AC, John Johnson stayed with the merged team ATK Mohun Bagan FC. He was as an unregistered player for 2020–21 Indian Super League. On 31 August 2021, John Johnson mutually terminated his contract with the club.

=== RoundGlass Punjab ===
On 1 September 2021, John Johnson joined I-League club RoundGlass Punjab FC ahead of 2021–22 I-League.

== Style of play ==
Though Johnson mainly plays as a centre-back or as a right back, but journalist Arunava Chaudhuri said he is "equally comfortable in defensive midfield." After playing in India, sports website The Hard Tackle described Johnson as "one of the best footballing imports to the country". The website also praised his height as it is "influential in defence as it is from both attacking and defensive set-pieces." He was recognised by BBC as "consistent, a firm fans' favourite and a brave, no nonsense defender."

== Career statistics ==
=== Club ===
As of match played on 14 March 2020

Appearances and goals by club, season and competition
Club	Season	League			Cup (Note: Appearances in the FA Cup, Football League Cup and Federation Cup)		Other		Total	
Club	Season	Division	Apps	Goals	Apps	Goals	Apps	Goals	Apps	Goals
Middlesbrough	2008–09	Premier League	1	0	0	0	—		1	0
Tranmere Rovers (loan)	2008–09	League One	4	0	0	0	1 (Note: Appearances in the Football League Trophy)	0	5	0
Northampton Town (loan)	2009–10	League Two	36	5	1	0	1	0	38	5
Northampton Town	2010–11	League Two	38	6	3	1	—		41	7
Northampton Town	2011–12	League Two	45	2	3	0	—		48	2
Northampton Town	2012–13	League Two	20	0	2	0	2 (Note: Appearances in Football League play-offs)	0	24	0
Northampton Town	Total		139	13	9	1	3	0	151	14
Bengaluru	2013–14	I-League	23	3	3	0	—		26	3
Bengaluru	2014–15	I-League	19	1	6	0	6 (Note: Appearance in AFC Champions League and AFC Cup)	0	31	1
Bengaluru	2015–16	I-League	14	0	0	0	11	0	25	0
Bengaluru	2016–17	I-League	12	0	5	0	5	1	22	1
Bengaluru	2017–18	Indian Super League	18	0	4	0	—		22	0
Bengaluru	Total		86	4	18	0	22	1	126	5
ATK	2018–19	Indian Super League	17	1	3	0	—		20	1
ATK	2019–20	Indian Super League	1	0	0	0	3 (Note: Appearances in Indian Super League playoffs)	0	4	0
ATK	Total		18	1	3	0	3	0	24	1
Career total			244	18	30	1	29	1	303	20

== Honours ==
Bengaluru

- I-League: 2013–14, 2015–16
- Federation Cup: 2014–15, 2016–17

ATK

- Indian Super League: 2019–20

Individual

- Best Defender of I-League: 2013–14
