= Sean Rooney (soccer) =

Australian soccer player

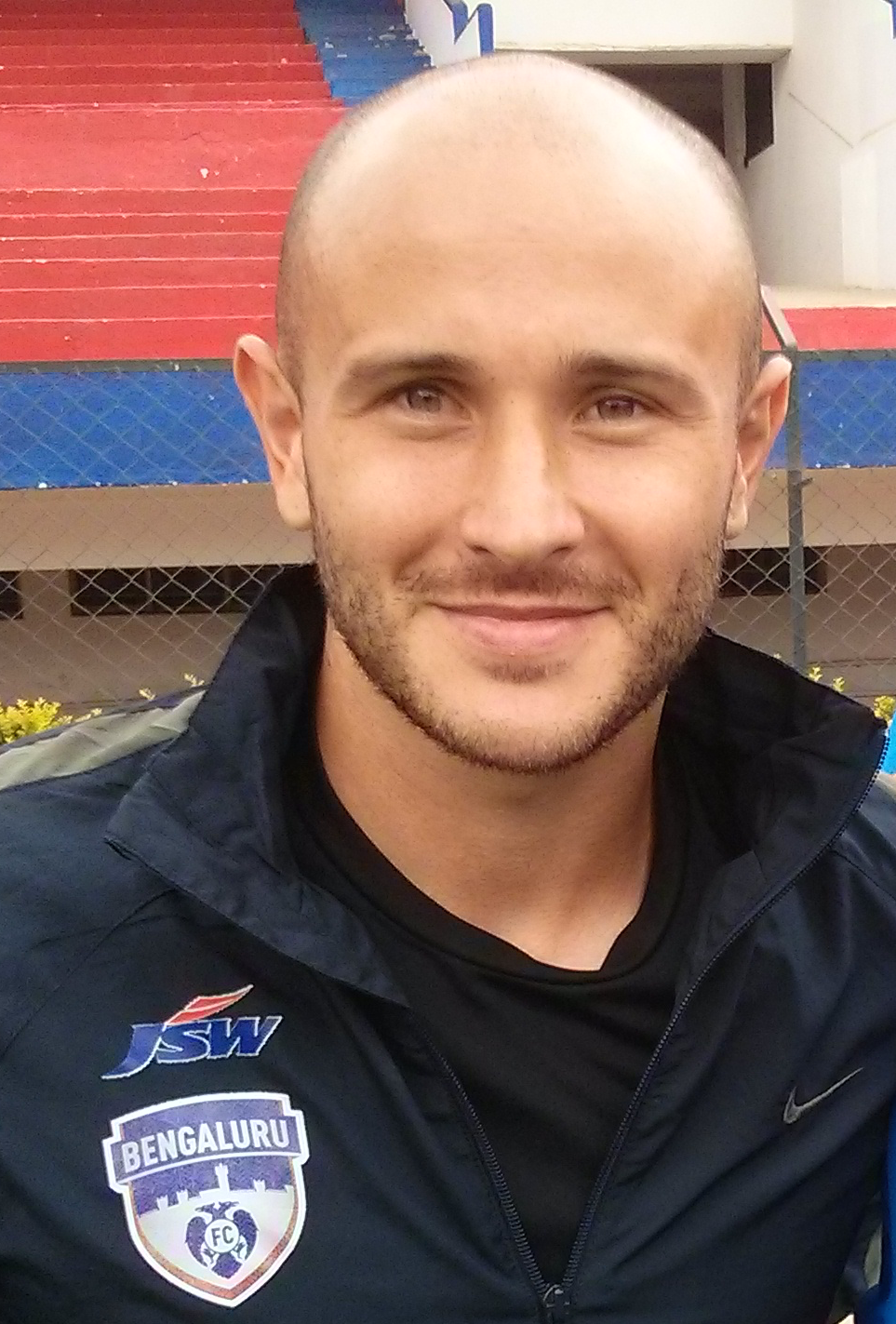

Personal information
- Full name: Sean Daniel Rooney
- Date of birth: 1 March 1989 (age 37)
- Place of birth: Blacktown, New South Wales, Australia
- Height: 1.76 m (5 ft 9 in)
- Position: Striker

Youth career
- 2008: Sydney

Senior career*
| Years | Team | Apps | (Gls) |
| 2006–2008 | Blacktown City | 33 | (11) |
| 2008–2011 | Newcastle Jets | 29 | (3) |
| 2011 | Blacktown City | 6 | (1) |
| 2011–2012 | Deltras | 14 | (6) |
| 2012 | Blacktown City | 10 | (7) |
| 2012 | Salgaocar | 9 | (2) |
| 2013 | Blacktown City | 21 | (14) |
| 2013–2015 | Bengaluru FC | 38 | (14) |
| 2015 | Oakleigh Cannons | 8 | (2) |
| 2015–2018 | Marconi Stallions | 68 | (52) |
| 2019–2020 | Mounties Wanderers | 19 | (9) |
| 2021 | Blacktown City | 5 | (0) |
| Total | | 260 | (121) |

International career
| 2009 | Australia U20 | 3 | (0) |
- * Club domestic league appearances and goals

Sean Rooney (born 1 March 1989) is an Australian former soccer player who played as a striker.

== Club career ==
Rooney started his A-League career playing in the Youth League with Sydney FC. He was the league's top goal scorer before he was signed by Newcastle United Jets on a short-term injury replacement for Jason Naidovski. He made his A-League debut in Round 15 of the 2008–09 season against Queensland Roar. His first goal for the club, undoubtedly the most important in his fledgling career and a significant one in the short history of the Jets, was an injury-time matchwinner in the club's must-win encounter against Beijing Guoan on Matchday 5 of the 2009 AFC Champions League. In the final minute of the match, and with the score locked at 1–1, Rooney latched onto a fumbled pass from Ljubo Miličević on the edge of the area and struck the ball sweetly with his left foot, curling it into the top left corner of the net to send Newcastle players, staff and fans into raptures, with the club needing only a point from its final game (away to Ulsan Hyundai Horang-i) to qualify for the next stage of Asian football's premier international club competition.

Rooney scored his first goal in the A-League in his first starting appearance for Newcastle Jets in Round 4 of the 2009–10 season against Gold Coast United. Rooney struck a powerful left-footed shot from the left-edge of the box, ending Gold Coast's aspirations of going through the season undefeated.

=== Bengaluru FC ===
On 24 August 2013 it was confirmed that Rooney had signed with Bengaluru FC of the I-League. He made his debut for the side in their very first I-League on 22 September 2013 against Mohun Bagan A.C. in which he scored the very first goal in the club's history in the 50th minute as Bengaluru went on to draw the match 1–1. He then scored his second goal of the season in the very next match against Rangdajied United F.C. in which he found the net in the 57th minute as Bengaluru went on to win the match 3–0.

After failing to score in the next match against United, Rooney once again found the net for the third time of the season against Mohammedan in which he scored in the 28th minute as Bengaluru FC won 2–1. He then scored his first brace of the season when he scored two against Dempo on 23 October 2013 as Bengaluru won 3–1.

Rooney then began the month of November in good form when he scored the opening goal for Bengaluru FC in their match against Mumbai in the 7th minute. The match eventually ended in a 2–2 draw. He then did not score another goal for a month till 8 December against Churchill Brothers in which his 50th-minute strike helped Bengaluru FC to a 3–1 away victory.

=== Oakleigh Cannons ===
On 1 June 2015, it was announced that Rooney signed for Oakleigh Cannons.

=== Marconi Stallions ===
Towards the end of October 2015, it was announced that Rooney, and Oakleigh teammate Mirjan Pavlović, would be signing for the recently relegated Marconi Stallions FC in the NSW NPL 2.

== Career statistics ==
=== Club ===
Appearances and goals by club, season and competition
| Club | Season | League | | | Cup | | Continental | | Total | |
| Club | Season | Division | Apps | Goals | Apps | Goals | Apps | Goals | Apps | Goals |
|---|---|---|---|---|---|---|---|---|---|---|
| Newcastle Jets | 2008–09 | A-League | 4 | 0 | 0 | 0 | — | | 4 | 0 |
| Newcastle Jets | 2009–10 | A-League | 17 | 2 | 0 | 0 | — | | 17 | 2 |
| Newcastle Jets | 2010–11 | A-League | 8 | 1 | 0 | 0 | — | | 8 | 1 |
| Newcastle Jets | Total | | 29 | 3 | 0 | 0 | — | | 29 | 3 |
| Deltras | 2011–12 | ISL | 10 | 4 | 0 | 0 | — | | 10 | 4 |
| Deltras | Total | | 10 | 4 | 0 | 0 | — | | 10 | 4 |
| Salgaocar | 2012–13 | I-League | 9 | 2 | 1 | 0 | — | | 10 | 2 |
| Salgaocar | Total | | 9 | 2 | 1 | 0 | — | | 10 | 2 |
| Bengaluru FC | 2013–14 | I-League | 21 | 10 | 3 | 0 | — | | 24 | 10 |
| Bengaluru FC | 2014–15 | I-League | 17 | 4 | 6 | 1 | 5 | 0 | 27 | 4 |
| Bengaluru FC | Total | | 38 | 14 | 9 | 1 | 5 | 0 | 52 | 15 |
| Career total | | | 86 | 23 | 10 | 1 | 4 | 0 | 100 | 24 |

== International career ==
Rooney played in all three games in the Young Socceroos' 2009 FIFA U-20 World Cup campaign, starting in one.

== Personal life ==
His dad is Irish and mother is Italian. Rooney attended Patrician Brothers' College Blacktown.
