= Darren Caldeira =

Indian footballer (born 1987)

Personal information
- Date of birth: 19 September 1987 (age 39)
- Place of birth: Mumbai (Bombay), India
- Position: Central midfielder

Team information
- Current team: Bengaluru FC (director of football)

Youth career
- Mahindra United
- 2005: Valencia

Senior career*
Years	Team	Apps	(Gls)
2010–2011	Air India	7	(6)
2011–2013	Mumbai	10	(7)
2013–2015	Bengaluru FC	11	(3)
2015–2016	Mumbai FC	6	(3)
2016–2017	Bengaluru FC	3	(2)
2017	Chennai City FC	9	(4)
2017–2018	ATK	3	(1)
2018–2019	Mohun Bagan	13	(0)
2019–2020	Kerala Blasters	1	(0)
- * Club domestic league appearances and goals

Darren Caldeira (born 19 September 1987) is an Indian former professional association footballer who played as a central midfielder. He serves as director of football for Bengaluru FC. Caldeira has also worked as a commentator in the Indian Super League for Star Sports.

== Career ==
=== Early career ===
Born in Mumbai, Maharashtra, India, Caldeira spent his youth career with Mahindra United. He later spent a year with the under-18 team of Spanish La Liga side Valencia CF. Then in 2010, after Mahindra United disbanded, Caldeira signed with Air India FC of the I-League. After spending two seasons with Air India Caldeira signed with Mumbai FC.

=== Bengaluru FC ===
In July 2013, it was announced that Caldeira had signed with new direct-entry side Bengaluru FC. He then made his debut for the side on 29 September, 2013 against Rangdajied United F.C., in which he started and played the full 90 minutes as Bengaluru won the match 3–0.

He was signed by Bengaluru FC again in August 2016 for a four-months deal, and was released by the club in November 2016.

=== Mumbai ===
In 2015, Caldeira signed for Mumbai FC

=== Chennai City ===
In 2017, Caldeira was signed by new I-League entrant Chennai City FC and made his first appearance for the club as a substitute in the first game against Minerva Punjab F.C.

=== ATK ===
In September 2017 he joined ATK of Indian Super League. This was his first ever stint in ISL. He didn't really have an ideal season for ATK and couldn't do anything to turn around their disappointing campaign. He was given a lot of opportunities by manager Ashley Westwood and even though he did well to keep things moving in midfield, he lacked an attacking spark.

=== Mohun Bagan ===
In July 2018 it was announced that Mohun Bagan have signed caldeira for the upcoming Calcutta Football League & I-League seasons.

=== Final years at Kerala Blasters ===
In 2019, Caldeira was signed by Indian Super League side Kerala Blasters. He was affected by a sports injury, and only made one appearance during the season. At the age of 33, he retired from professional on 31 December 2020.

== Career statistics ==
As of 31 May 2016

Club	Season	League		Federation Cup		Durand Cup		AFC		Total	
Club	Season	Apps	Goals	Apps	Goals	Apps	Goals	Apps	Goals	Apps	Goals
Bengaluru FC	2013–14	15	0	1	0	0	0	0	0	16	0
Bengaluru FC	2014–15	0	0	0	0	0	0	0	0	0	0
Mumbai FC	2015–16	2	0	0	0	0	0	0	0	2	0
Bengaluru FC	2016–17	0	0	0	0	0	0	0	0	0	0
Career total		17	0	1	0	0	0	0	0	18	0

== See also ==
- List of Indian football players in foreign leagues
