= Keegan Pereira (footballer) =

Indian footballer

Personal information
- Full name: Keegan Joseph Clarance Pereira
- Date of birth: 7 November 1987 (age 39)
- Place of birth: Mumbai, Maharashtra, India
- Height: 1.80 m (5 ft 11 in)
- Position: Left back

Team information
- Current team: RoundGlass Punjab FC

Senior career*
Years	Team	Apps	(Gls)
2007–2011	Mumbai	40	(1)
2012–2013	Salgaocar	0	(0)
2013	DSK Shivajians	6	(3)
2013–2015	Bengaluru FC	36	(0)
2015–2016	Mumbai City	6	(0)
2016	→ Bengaluru FC (loan)	8	(0)
2016	Atlético de Kolkata	6	(0)
2017	Bengaluru FC	2	(0)
2017	ATK	17	(0)
2018–2019	NorthEast United	15	(0)
2019–2020	Jamshedpur FC	4	(0)
2020–2021	East Bengal FC	0	(0)
2021–2022	Punjab FC		
2023–	MYJ-GMSC		

International career^{‡}
2016	India	4	(0)
- * Club domestic league appearances and goals as of 5 May 2020 ‡ National team caps and goals as of 08:24, 11 March 2015 (UTC)

Keegan Pereira (born 7 November 1987) is an Indian professional footballer who plays as a left back for East Bengal FC.

== Club career ==
=== Early career ===
Born in Borvali I C Colony Mumbai, Maharashtra, from 2006 to 2012 Pereira played for Mumbai in the I-League. While with Mumbai, Keegan Pereira scored a goal against Salgaocar on 29 April 2011 at the Cooperage Ground as Mumbai won 3–2.

After spending six years with Mumbai, Keegan joined former I-League champions Salgaocar where he spent an entire season without playing a single game. He played in the local Goa Football League where he was a player to watch out for and In January 2013, he signed for an I-League 2nd Division team DSK Shivajians. Keegan appeared 6 times for DSK and scored once against Rangdajied United in the group stages, but could not help his team qualify for the final round.

=== Bengaluru FC ===
In June 2013, it was announced that Pereira had signed with new direct-entry side Bengaluru FC for the 2013–14 I-League season. He made his debut for the side in their opening I-League match ever on 22 September 2013 against Mohun Bagan in which he started and played the full game also gaining a penalty for BFC after being brought down by a Mohun Bagan defender in the penalty box as Bengaluru drew 1–1.

=== Mumbai City FC ===
In July 2015 Pereira was drafted to play for Mumbai City FC in the 2015 Indian Super League.

== International career ==
Pereira made played his first match for India against Laos on 7 June 2016. He was 508th player to represent India.

== Personal life ==
Keegan Pereira's brother, Dane Pereira is also a footballer, who plays for Mumbai F.C. Keegan Pereira is married to Lorna Tone on 2 January 2016 and has a son born on 19 May 2017.
