= Malsawmzuala =

Indian footballer

Personal information
- Date of birth: 12 September 1997 (age 29)
- Place of birth: Aizawl, Mizoram, India
- Height: 1.79 m (5 ft 10 1/2 in)
- Position: Midfielder

Team information
- Current team: Diamond Harbour
- Number: 30

Youth career
- 2012–2015: Chanmari
- 2012–2015: AIFF Elite Academy

Senior career*
Years	Team	Apps	(Gls)
2015–2018	Bengaluru	15	(1)
2016	→ Delhi Dynamos (loan)	4	(1)
2018–2020	ATK	0	(0)
2019–2020	ATK B	8	(0)
2018–2019	→ Jamshedpur (loan)	4	(0)
2020–2021	Sudeva Delhi	0	(0)
2021–2022	Mohammedan	0	(0)
2022	Aizawl	0	(0)
2022–2025	Chanmari	22	(1)
2025–	Diamond Harbour	0	(0)

International career
2015–2017	India U19	3	(0)
- * Club domestic league appearances and goals as of 23:44, 19 April 2025 (UTC)

Malsawmzuala (born 12 September 1997) is an Indian professional footballer who plays as a midfielder for I-League club Diamond Harbour.

== Career ==
=== Bengaluru FC ===
Malsawmzuala made his debut for Bengaluru FC on 9 January 2015 against Salgaocar. On 10 April 2016, Malsawmzuala scored screamer against East Bengal F.C. in a crucial game in I-League.

==== Delhi Dynamos (loan) ====
On 2 September 2016, ISL club Delhi Dynamos secure the signing of Malsawmzuala on loan from Bengaluru FC. On 18 November 2016, Sawmtea scored his first ISL goal against FC Pune City in debut match for Delhi Dynamos. Sawmtea is youngest goal scorer in history of Indian Super League.

=== ATK ===
In July 2018, Sawmtea signed with Kolkata-based club ATK for 2 years.

==== Jamshedpur FC(loan) ====
On 30 November 2018, Jamshedpur FC signed Malsawmzuala on loan for remaining of the season from ATK.

== International career ==
Malsawmzuala made his debut for India U19 in Frenz International U19 Cup which was held in Malaysia. On 4 January 2015, he made his debut for India U19 against Estudiantes coming-on as 64th-minute substitute for Robinson Singh at the UiTM Stadium.

== Career statistics ==
=== Club ===
As of 22 July 2025

Club	Season	League			Cup		AFC		Others		Total	
Club	Season	Division	Apps	Goals	Apps	Goals	Apps	Goals	Apps	Goals	Apps	Goals
Bengaluru	2015–16	I-League	10	1	—		4 (Note: Appearance(s) in AFC Cup)	0	—		14	1
Bengaluru	2016–17	I-League	5	0	2 (Note: Appearance(s) in Federation Cup)	0	3	0	—		10	0
Bengaluru	2017–18	Indian Super League	0	0	1 (Note: Appearance(s) in Super Cup)	0	10	0	—		11	0
Bengaluru	Total		15	1	3	0	17	0	0	0	35	1
Delhi Dynamos (loan)	2016	Indian Super League	4	1	—		—		—		4	1
ATK	2019–20	Indian Super League	0	0	—		—		3 (Note: Appearance(s) in Durand Cup)	0	3	0
Jamshedpur (loan)	2018–19	Indian Super League	4	0	—		—		—		4	0
ATK B	2019–20	I-League 2nd Division	8	0	—		—		—		8	0
Mohammedan	2021–22	I-League	0	0	—		—		1	—	1	0
Chanmari	2024–25	I-League 3	9	1	—		—		—		9	1
Chanmari	2024–25	I-League 2	13	0	—		—		—		13	0
Chanmari	Total		22	1	0	0	0	0	0	0	22	1
Diamond Harbour	2025–26	I-League	0	0	—		—		5 (Note: Appearance(s) in Calcutta Football League)	0	5	0
Career total			53	3	3	0	17	0	9	0	82	3
