= 2015–16 Bengaluru FC season =

2015–2016 football season for Bengaluru Football Club

Bengaluru
2015–16 season
- West Block Blues display banners during Bengaluru FC vs East Bengal at Sree Kanteerava.
- Chairman: Parth Jindal
- Manager: Ashley Westwood
- Stadium: Sree Kanteerava Stadium
- I-League: 1st
- Federation Cup: Quarter-finals
- AFC Cup: Round of 16 (Note: Bengaluru advanced to the quarter-finals which were played during the 2016–17 season)
- Top goalscorer: League: Kim Song-yong; Sunil Chhetri (5 each); All: Sunil Chhetri (9)
- Highest home attendance: 17,554 vs Mohun Bagan (13 February 2016)
- Lowest home attendance: 2,487 vs Lao Toyota (27 April 2016)
| Home colours | Away colours | Third colours |

The 2015–16 season was the third in the history of Bengaluru Football Club. It began on 1 June 2015 and concluded on 31 May 2016, with competitive matches occurring between January and May. The club ended their I-League campaign as champions for the second time, only winning by two points ahead of second placed Mohun Bagan. In the Federation Cup, Bengaluru were eliminated early in the first round, suffering defeat to Aizawl. In the AFC Cup, Bengaluru managed to make it past the Round of 16, defeating Kitchee. The victory had qualified the club for the quarter-finals which would take place the next season.

Prior to the start of the season, Bengaluru were very active making squad changes. Players who have been with the club since their first season such as Sean Rooney and domestic players Darren Caldeira, Malemngamba Meitei, Pawan Kumar, and Robin Singh left after their contracts expired. Club captain Sunil Chhetri and midfielder Thoi Singh had also left the club for Indian Super League clubs Mumbai City and Chennaiyin respectively. Both would return on loan after the 2015 ISL season. Forward Kim Song-yong was signed by head coach Ashley Westwood to replace Rooney. Midfielder Michael Collins was signed a couple weeks after the start of the I-League season as an injury replacement to Josh Walker. Indian youth internationals Amrinder Singh and Seiminlen Doungel were also brought in by Westwood, alongside young prospects Daniel Lalhlimpuia, Malsawmzuala, and Nishu Kumar from the AIFF Elite Academy.

Due to the Indian Super League, Bengaluru didn't start playing competitive matches until January. The team began their league campaign positively with five victories from their first seven matches putting them first in the table. A defeat by title contenders Mohun Bagan in February saw Bengaluru slip to second. The club wouldn't return to first place until the final month of the campaign. Bengaluru had won five of their last seven matches, clinching the title with a 2–0 victory against Salgaocar with one match left to play. After the I-League season, Bengaluru participated in the Federation Cup and were eliminated in the first round by Aizawl. The club also participated in the AFC Cup, Asia's secondary international club competition. Bengaluru's Asian campaign began slowly with two defeats to open the group stage, but three victories in a row helped push the club to finish second in the table. In the Round of 16, the club took on Kitchee and won 3–2. The victory qualified Bengaluru for the quarter-finals, which would take place during Bengaluru's next season.

Bengaluru's top goalscorer for the third season in a row was captain Sunil Chhetri, who scored 9 goals from 20 matches. The club had four representatives win an individual award following the I-League season. Amrinder Singh was awarded as the best goalkeeper, John Johnson as best defender, Eugeneson Lyngdoh as best midfielder, and Ashley Westwood as best coach. This season would also be Westwood's last as head coach with him departing at the end of his contract.

== Background ==
Bengaluru had begun the previous season by winning the Federation Cup. The club defeated Dempo in the final on 11 January 2015 at the Fatorda Stadium, their first ever domestic cup championship. The club entered their second I-League campaign as the defending champions, having won the 2013–14 title. After a slow start to the season – not earning a victory in the first three matches, two of them defeats – Bengaluru would go on to win 10 of their last 17 matches, not suffering a single defeat, and were favorites to win their second title in a row, something that has not been done before in I-League history. The club entered the last match day in second place, two points behind Mohun Bagan. Coincidently, Bengaluru were to take on Mohun Bagan at home. Despite having the home advantage and taking the lead before halftime through John Johnson, Mohun Bagan defender Bello Razaq managed to score an 87th-minute equalizer and help his side to a 1–1 draw. The draw meant that Bengaluru finished as runners-up to Mohun Bagan.

In February 2015, Bengaluru played in the AFC Champions League qualifiers for the first time. The club were defeated in extra time 2–1 by Malaysian club Johor Darul Ta'zim. The result meant that Bengaluru dropped down to the AFC Cup, Asia's secondary club competition. In the AFC Cup, Bengaluru finished second in their group, winning every match besides the two against Persipura Jayapura. The club were drawn against South China of Hong Kong in the Round of 16. Bengaluru were defeated 2–0 at the Mong Kok Stadium and thus knocked-out of the competition.

Bengaluru players returned for pre-season on 27 July 2015. After just failing to retain the league title and being knocked-out in the AFC Cup, head coach Ashley Westwood stated in a press conference that Bengaluru were "looking at players who can come in and affect an AFC Cup game". Westwood also commented on the upstart Indian Super League and the disruption to the I-League season stating "We've had two years to prepare for the ISL. The elite players in the country are prepared to withstand a 40-50 game season."

As soon as the previous season ended, it was announced that Sean Rooney would be leaving the club to sign with Oakleigh Cannons in Australia. Also let go were goalkeeper Pawan Kumar, midfielders Darren Caldeira and Malemngamba Meitei, and forward Karan Sawhney after their contracts expired. Also released from the side were club captain Sunil Chhetri, midfielder Thoi Singh, and forward Robin Singh. All three would go on to join Indian Super League sides. It was later revealed by Bengaluru CEO Parth Jindal that the players were released as part of an agreement between the club and ISL that Chhetri, Thoi, and Robin would be loaned back to Bengaluru after the 2015 season.

Bengaluru made their first signings of the season on 3 June 2015, bringing in North Korean forward Kim Song-yong from Royal Wahingdoh and midfielder Seiminlen Doungel from Shillong Lajong. It was then announced two days later on 5 June that the club had extended the contracts of 10 players: Eugeneson Lyngdoh, Josh Walker, Shankar Sampingiraj, Rino Anto, Lalchhuanmawia, Udanta Singh, Lalthuammawia Ralte, C. K. Vineeth, Beikhokhei Beingaichho, and Siam Hanghal. In July 2015, Bengaluru brought in India international midfielder Alwyn George from Dempo.

In October 2015, Bengaluru signed Indian youth international defender Salam Ranjan Singh on loan from Pune. The next month, the club completed the triple signing of youth internationals Nishu Kumar, Malsawmzuala, and Daniel Lalhlimpuia from the AIFF Elite Academy. Bengaluru then completed their signings in December 2015, bringing in goalkeeper Amrinder Singh on loan from Pune.

Prior to the start of the season, Westwood stated that the club "managed to work fairly consistently over the last four weeks. Got some new boys in and it’s always nice to have new faces to push the ones that are here who are getting a little comfortable. We’re stronger...".

=== Transfers ===
In

| No. | Position | Player | Signed from | Date | Ref |
|---|---|---|---|---|---|
| 9 | FW | (North Korea) Kim Song-yong | (India) Royal Wahingdoh | 3 June 2015 | |
| 17 | FW | (India) Seiminlen Doungel | (India) Shillong Lajong | 3 June 2015 | |
| 20 | MF | (India) Alwyn George | (India) Dempo | 29 July 2015 | |
| 22 | DF | (India) Nishu Kumar | (India) AIFF Elite Academy | 17 November 2015 | |
| 30 | MF | (India) Malsawmzuala | (India) AIFF Elite Academy | 17 November 2015 | |
| 25 | FW | (India) Daniel Lalhlimpuia | (India) AIFF Elite Academy | 17 November 2015 | |
| 8 | MF | (Republic of Ireland) Michael Collins | (England) Oxford United | 21 January 2016 | |
| 27 | GK | (India) Nikhil Bernard | (India) Royal Wahingdoh | 2 February 2016 | |

Out

| No. | Position | Player | Signed to | Date | Ref |
|---|---|---|---|---|---|
| 7 | FW | (Australia) Sean Rooney | (Australia) Oakleigh Cannons | 1 June 2015 | |
| 1 | GK | (India) Pawan Kumar | (India) Chennaiyin | 1 June 2015 | |
| 25 | GK | (India) Soram Anganba | (India) Aizawl | 1 June 2015 | |
| 5 | DF | (India) Gurtej Singh | (India) Fateh Hyderabad | 1 June 2015 | |
| 20 | DF | (India) Keegan Pereira | (India) Mumbai City | 1 June 2015 | |
| 15 | MF | (India) Darren Caldeira | (India) Mumbai | 1 June 2015 | |
| 8 | MF | (India) Malemngamba Meitei | (India) Mumbai | 1 June 2015 | |
| 32 | MF | (India) Shilton D'Silva | (India) Mumbai | 1 June 2015 | |
| 12 | MF | (India) Thoi Singh | (India) Chennaiyin | 1 June 2015 | |
| 17 | FW | (India) Karan Sawhney | (India) Mumbai | 1 June 2015 | |
| 9 | FW | (India) Robin Singh | (India) Delhi Dynamos | 1 June 2015 | |
| 11 | FW | (India) Sunil Chhetri | (India) Mumbai City | 1 June 2015 | |

Loans in

| No. | Position | Player | Loaned from | Date | Ref |
|---|---|---|---|---|---|
| 24 | DF | (India) Salam Ranjan Singh | (India) Pune | 24 October 2015 | |
| 20 | DF | (India) Keegan Pereira | (India) Mumbai City | 20 December 2015 | |
| 12 | MF | (India) Thoi Singh | (India) Chennaiyin | 20 December 2015 | |
| 11 | FW | (India) Sunil Chhetri | (India) Mumbai City | 20 December 2015 | |
| 1 | GK | (India) Amrinder Singh | (India) Pune | 25 December 2015 | |

Loans out

| No. | Position | Player | Team | Start Date | End Date | Ref |
|---|---|---|---|---|---|---|
| 13 | DF | (India) Rino Anto | (India) Atlético de Kolkata | 3 October 2015 | 20 December 2015 | |
| 14 | MF | (India) Eugeneson Lyngdoh | (India) Pune City | 3 October 2015 | 20 December 2015 | |
| 16 | FW | (India) Shankar Sampingiraj | (India) Kerala Blasters | 3 October 2015 | 20 December 2015 | |
| 19 | MF | (India) Siam Hanghal | (India) NorthEast United | 3 October 2015 | 20 December 2015 | |
| 23 | DF | (India) Lalchhuanmawia | (India) Mumbai City | 3 October 2015 | 20 December 2015 | |
| 28 | GK | (India) Lalthuammawia Ralte | (India) NorthEast United | 3 October 2015 | 20 December 2015 | |
| 31 | MF | (India) C. K. Vineeth | (India) Kerala Blasters | 3 October 2015 | 20 December 2015 | |

== Pre-season ==
To prepare for the upcoming season, Bengaluru played two friendlies in August against the India under-19 side. In their first match on 8 August 2015, Bengaluru won 5–2 with Sunil Chhetri opening the scoring the 5th minute. The India under-19 side then scored two goals before halftime and went into the break with the 2–1 lead. In the second half, Bengaluru came back and scored four goals through Alwyn George, N.S. Manju, Eugeneson Lyngdoh, and Robin Singh. Bengaluru's second match against the under-19 side was on 12 August. Bengaluru once again went into halftime down, losing 1–0 at the break, but managed to score five in the second half to win 5–2 again.

In addition to the two friendly matches, Bengaluru also participated in the 2015–16 Bangalore Super Division to prepare for the I-League season. One of the matches included an 11–0 victory over Income Tax on 27 December 2015.

| 8 August 2015 Friendly | Bengaluru | 5–2 | India U19 | Bangalore |
| 10:30 | Chhetri 5'; George 56'; Manju 66'; Lyngdoh 82'; R. Singh 89' | Report | Lalhlimpuia 6'; B. Singh 21' | Stadium: Bangalore Football Stadium |

| 12 August 2015 Friendly | Bengaluru | 5–2 | India U19 | Bangalore |
| 19:30 | Doungel 55'; Song-yong 56'; Chhetri 66'; George 80'; Vineeth 90' | Report | Rai 37'; Lalhlimpuia 73' | Stadium: Bangalore Football Stadium |

== Competitions ==
=== Overall ===
| Competition | Started round | Final position | First match | Last match |
|---|---|---|---|---|
| I-League | — | Winners | 9 January 2016 | 23 April 2016 |
| AFC Cup | Group stage | Round of 16 | 24 February 2016 | 25 May 2016 |
| Federation Cup | Quarter-finals | Quarter-finals | 30 April 2016 | 3 May 2016 |

Last Updated: 25 May 2016
Source : Competitions

=== Overview ===
| Competition | Record | | | | | | | |
| Competition | Pld | W | D | L | GF | GA | GD | Win % |
|---|---|---|---|---|---|---|---|---|
| I-League | 16 | 10 | 2 | 4 | 24 | 17 | +7 | 62.50 |
| AFC Cup | 7 | 4 | 0 | 3 | 12 | 12 | +0 | 57.14 |
| Federation Cup | 2 | 0 | 0 | 2 | 3 | 5 | −2 | 0.00 |
| Total | 25 | 14 | 2 | 9 | 39 | 34 | +5 | 56.00 |

Last updated: 25 May 2016
Source: Competitions

=== I-League ===
==== Summary ====
===== January =====
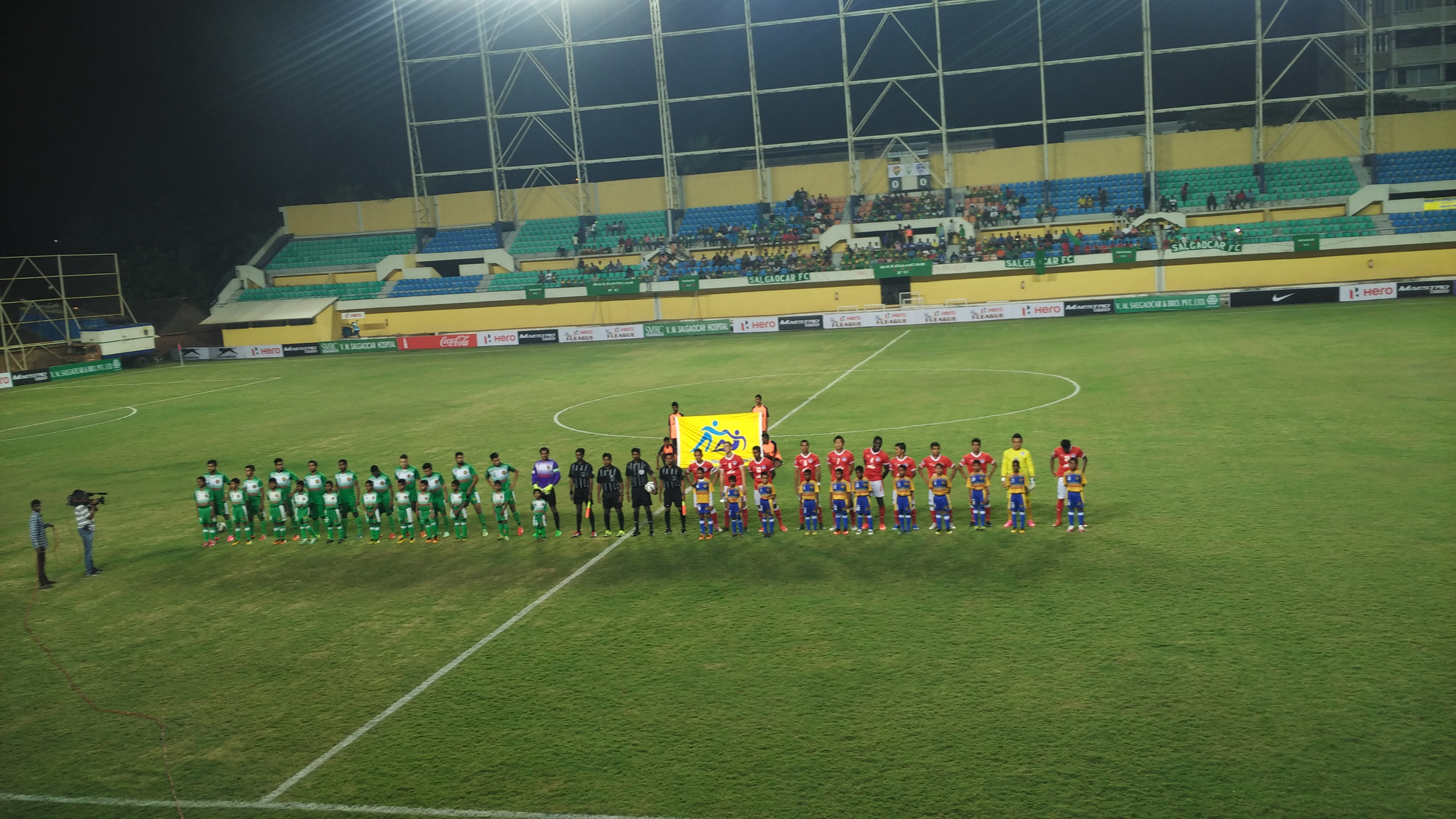
Salgaocar vs Bengaluru FC

Bengaluru kicked off their season with an away game against Salgaocar on 9 January 2016. Bengaluru took an early lead when C.K. Vineeth put a pass from Kim Song-Yong in the net. However, just before the half time, Jackichand Singh was brought down by Eugeneson Lyngdoh in the penalty area and Salgaocar were awarded the penalty. Darryl Duffy converted the penalty and equalized for Salgaocar. In the second half, Sunil Chhetri converted the free-kick into the goal in 61st minute and Bengaluru FC won the game 2–1, registering their sixth consecutive win against Salgaocar in all competitions. Bengaluru played the next game against I-League debutant Aizawl F.C. Curtis Osano's header from Keegan Pereira's free-kick in 27th minute was enough for Bengaluru to secure three points. In the first home game of the season, Bengaluru played Shillong Lajong. C.K. Vineeth registered the fastest goal of the season (38 seconds) for Bengaluru. Bengaluru doubled the lead when Kim Song-Yong scored his first goal for the team in 35th minute. Kim scored the brace in the 60th minute and Bengaluru reached the top of the table with the 3–0 and the third consecutive win. In the next away game against Mumbai F.C., Bengaluru quickly conceded the lead as Arata Izumi and Son Min-chol scored a goal each within 11 minutes. In spite of fair possession and counter-attack, Bengaluru couldn't convert their chances and faced the first loss of the season. The loss also ended Bengaluru FC's unbeaten streak of 16 games in the league dating back to previous season's game against Sporting Clube de Goa on 28 February 2015. In the month's last game, Bengaluru FC faced East Bengal and registered their first every away victory against the Kolkata side with a solitary goal by the captain Sunil Chhetri in the 60th minute and finished the month at the top of the table.

===== February =====
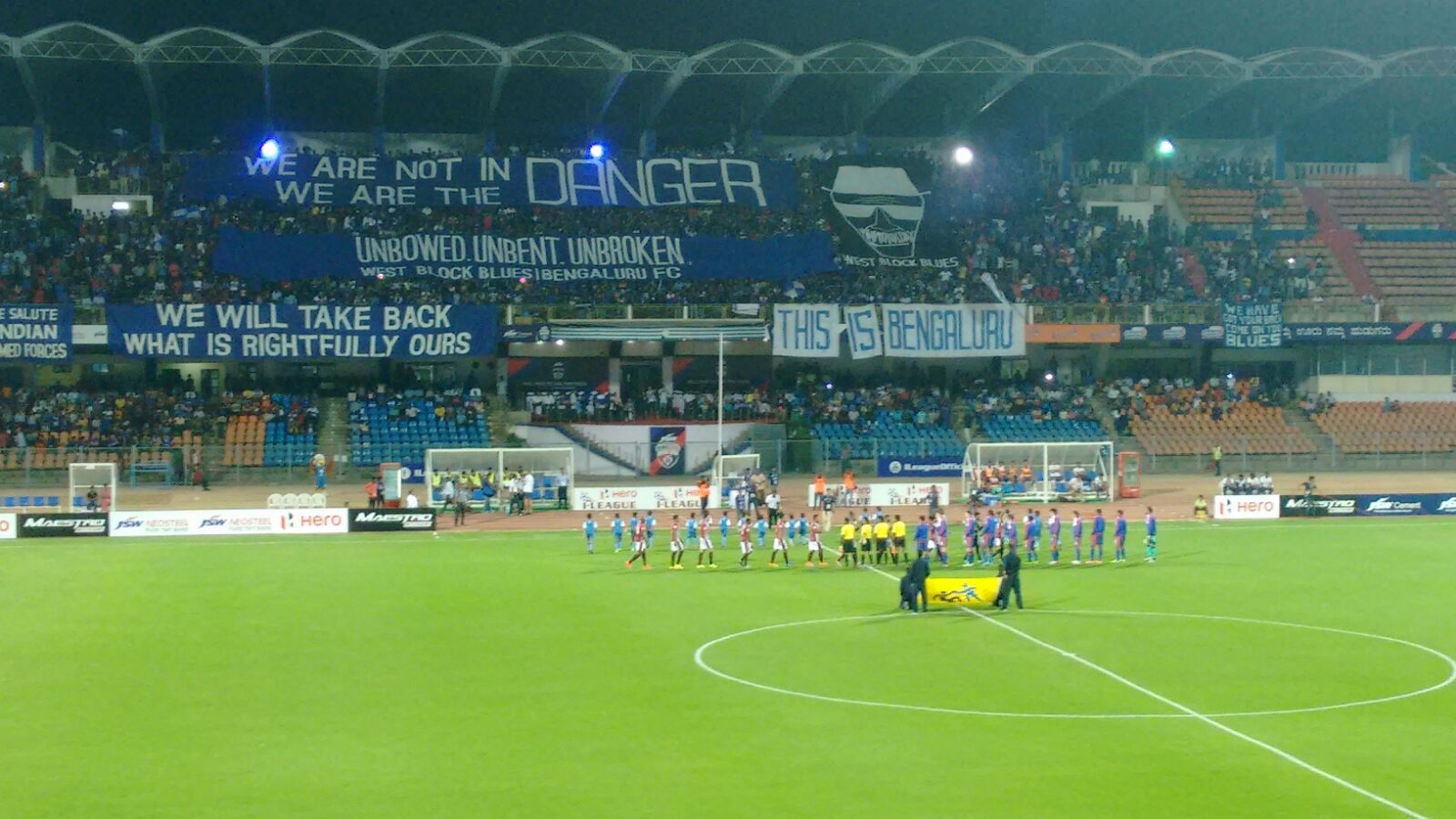
Banner at the Sree Kanteerava Stadium before Bengaluru FC took on Mohun Bagan

Bengaluru FC flagged February off with a home game against Sporting Clube de Goa. After missing an early chance, Bengaluru lost the lead when Odafa Onyeka Okolie scored in the 9th minute. Bengaluru's attack were unable to convert chances against 10-men Sporting until C.K. Vineeth found the back of the net in 64th minute. However, the home team's joy was short lived as Odafa completed his brace in 74th minute and Bengaluru faced first loss at home in the season. In the next home game Bengaluru FC faced I-League debutant DSK Shivajians F.C. Bengaluru were leading 2–0 with a goal each from Sunil Chhetri and Kim Song-Yong, but due to a defensive error from Bengaluru FC, DSK Shivajians pulled one back by a goal from ex-Bengaluru player Sampath Kuttymani, just before the half time. Bengaluru FC finished the game 4–1 with two more goals in the second half from substitutes Shankar Sampingiraj and Seminlen Doungel, and reclaimed the top spot. In the next game against the defending champion, Mohun Bagan, after the goalless first half, Lalchhuanmawia was sent off by the referee. Jeje Lalpekhlua finally broke the deadlock in 73rd minute from Cornell Glenn's pass. Mohun Bagan doubled the lead by Sony Norde's goal and Bengaluru FC faced second defeat at home and third defeat of the season. After facing a string of defeats, Bengaluru FC got back to winning ways against Aizawl F.C., when C.K. Vineeth's second half goal was enough to secure 3 points.

===== March =====
Bengaluru played the solo game I-League game in March against Shillong Lajong F.C. on 2 March 2016. Man of the match Udanta Singh scored his first ever goal in the I-League and gave Bengaluru FC the lead in the 36th minute. Bengaluru then maintained the lead with solid defending and sealed the game in 82nd minute when Kim Song-Yong's header doubled the lead from the corner kick of Udanta Singh.

===== April =====
Bengaluru played the first game of April against Mumbai F.C. Bengaluru's attack did not yield any results in the first half and remained goalless. Bengaluru continued the attack in the second half. After series of missed chances and almost a penalty, the substitute Daniel Lalhlimpuia broke the deadlock in 81st minute and Bengaluru FC registered their first ever win against the Mumbai team. Playing the next game against DSK Shivajians F.C., Bengaluru FC had a chance to move to the top of the table with a win. Returning from his injury Eugeneson Lyngdoh, gave the lead to the visitors in 34th minute from Sunil Chhetri's free kick, but 3 minutes later, Aser Pierrick Dipanda equalized and the score remained unchanged till the end of the game and Bengaluru FC remained in second position behind Mohun Bagan based on head-to-head record, with an extra game in the hand. Bengaluru FC next faced East Bengal F.C. in a potentially title deciding match on 10 April 2016. After starting aggressively, Bengaluru FC made a mistake in the midfield and Do Dong-hyun gave the lead to East Bengal in 27th minute. However, the lead was short lived as Eugeneson Lyngdoh brought Bengaluru FC on par in the next minute. Bengaluru continued the attack in the second half and they were rewarded with two more goals by Kim Song-Yong and Malsawmzuala. With the win, Bengaluru FC moved to the top of the table for the first time since February, and 2 points ahead of Mohun Bagan and 5 points ahead of East Bengal. With just 3 points required to seal the second title in three years, Bengaluru FC next faced Salgaocar on 18 April 2016. Eugeneson Lyngdoh struck early in 8th minute to give the early lead to the blues. Seminlen Doungel sealed the game in 87th minute when taped Sunil Chhetri's pass in the net and Bengaluru FC registered seventh straight win against the Goan club and also won 2015–16 I-League title with one round to go. Reacting to the title win, the manager Ashley Westwood said:

This victory feels a lot better. In the first one, people said it was a fluke given it was our first year. We should have won the second year also as we were the best side by a mile. We went 13 games undefeated. and lost with three or four minutes to go. I wanted that to never happen again. We have won it at home, in front of our own fans and a game to spare. All along the season I said 32 points will win it, two points a game and that has been proven right. We haven't had the best squad and not the best individual talents. Individuals win you games and not the league. That's what has happened. You saw a really well oiled side, all players and staff pulling in the right direction wanting to force the ball over the line.

Having secured the title, Bengaluru FC played the last game of the season against the defending champions Mohun Bagan. Ashley Westwood fielded the reserve side and Bengaluru FC faced massive 5–0 defeat in the inconsequential game.

==== Matches ====
| 9 January 2016 1 | Salgaocar | 1–2 | Bengaluru FC | Vasco da Gama |
| 19:05 IST | Duffy 41' (pen.); G. Kumar (yellow card) 60' | Report | Vineeth 5'; Johnson (yellow card) 32'; Lyngdoh (yellow card) 40'; Chhetri 61' | Stadium: Tilak Maidan Stadium; Attendance: 6,582; Referee: Santosh Kumar; Man of the Match: Thoi Singh (Bengaluru FC) |

| 16 January 2016 2 | Aizawl | 0–1 | Bengaluru FC | Aizawl |
| 13:00 IST | Lalramchullova (yellow card) 25'; Lalchawnkima (yellow card) 67' | Report | Johnson (yellow card) 7'; Osano 27'; T. Singh (yellow card) 59' | Stadium: Rajiv Gandhi Stadium; Referee: Ajit Meetei; Man of the Match: Lalthuammawia Ralte (Bengaluru FC) |

| 24 January 2016 3 | Bengaluru FC | 3–0 | Shillong Lajong | Bengaluru |
| 19:05 IST | Vineeth 1'; Song-Yong 35', 60'; Alwyn (yellow card) 48'; Osano (yellow card) 75' | Report | Khongjee (yellow card) 40'; Uilliams (yellow card) 61' | Stadium: Sree Kanteerava Stadium; Attendance: 11,284; Referee: Umesh Bora; Man of the Match: Kim Song-Yong (Bengaluru FC) |

| 27 January 2016 4 | Mumbai | 2–0 | Bengaluru FC | Mumbai |
| 16:30 IST | Izumi 5'; Min-chol 11'; Ramu (yellow card) 53' | Report | Vineeth (yellow card) 46'; T. Singh (yellow card) 57' | Stadium: Cooperage Ground; Referee: R. Venkatesh; Man of the Match: Son Min-chol (Mumbai) |

| 30 January 2016 5 | East Bengal | 0–1 | Bengaluru FC | Kolkata |
| 16:05 IST | Rehnesh (yellow card) 6'; Mallick (yellow card) 8'; Ranti (yellow card) 62'; Jairu (yellow card) 75' | Report | Doungel (yellow card) 26'; Chhetri 60'; Lalchhuanmawia (yellow card) 83' | Stadium: Barasat Stadium; Referee: Santhosh Kumar; Man of the Match: Amrinder Singh (Bengaluru FC) |

| 6 February 2016 6 | Bengaluru FC | 1–2 | Sporting Goa | Bengaluru |
| 19:05 IST | Johnson (yellow card) 28'; Anto (yellow card) 69'; Vineeth 69' | Report | Odafa 9', 73'; Ravanan (yellow card) 14' (yellow-red card) 21'; Devadas (yellow card) 59'; Clemente (yellow card) 86' | Stadium: Sree Kanteerava Stadium; Attendance: 11,768; Referee: R. Venkatesh; Man of the Match: Odafa Onyeka Okolie (Sporting Goa) |

| 9 February 2016 7 | Bengaluru FC | 4–1 | DSK Shivajians | Bengaluru |
| 19:05 IST | Chhetri 13'; Song-Yong 32'; Sampingiraj 52'; Doungel 79' | Report | Adnaik (yellow card) 10'; Stephen (yellow card) 17'; Kuttymani 45'; Pal (yellow card) 48' | Stadium: Sree Kanteerava Stadium; Attendance: 6,821; Referee: Priyobarta Singh; Man of the Match: Shankar Sampingiraj (Bengaluru FC) |

| 13 February 2016 8 | Bengaluru FC | 0–2 | Mohun Bagan | Bengaluru |
| 19:05 IST | Osano (yellow card) 26'; Lalchhuanmawia (yellow card) 45+2' (yellow-red card) 61' | Report | Halder (yellow card) 13'; Lalpekhlua 73'; Glenn (yellow card) 90+1'; Norde 90+4' | Stadium: Sree Kanteerava Stadium; Attendance: 17,554; Referee: Ajit Meetei; Man of the Match: Kean Lewis (Mohun Bagan) |

| 28 February 2016 9 | Bengaluru FC | 1–0 | Aizawl | Bengaluru |
| 19:05 IST | Vineeth 48'; Doungel (yellow card) 55' | Report | Kinowaki (yellow card) 55' | Stadium: Sree Kanteerava Stadium; Attendance: 8,848; Referee: Pranjal Banerjee; Man of the Match: Rino Anto (Bengaluru FC) |

| 2 March 2016 10 | Shillong Lajong | 0–2 | Bengaluru FC | Shillong |
| 16:30 IST | Kaith (yellow card) 15'; Shadap (yellow card) 45+1'; B. Singh (yellow card) 50'; Nongrum (yellow card) 59' | Report | Udanta 36'; Collins (yellow card) 55'; Song-Yong 82'; Chhetri (yellow card) 90+5' | Stadium: Jawaharlal Nehru Stadium; Referee: Ajit Meetei; Man of the Match: Udanta Singh (Bengaluru FC) |

| 6 March 2016 11 | Sporting Goa | 2–2 | Bengaluru FC | Margao |
| 16:30 IST | Masceranhas 19'; Odafa 38'; Enyinnaya (yellow card) 43' (yellow-red card) 45'; Amnah (yellow card) 85' | Report | Sunil Chhetri 42' (pen.), 67' | Stadium: Fatorda Stadium; Referee: Santosh Kumar; Man of the Match: Arindam Bhattacharya (Sporting Goa) |

| 2 April 2016 12 | Bengaluru FC | 1–0 | Mumbai | Bengaluru |
| 19:05 IST | Osano (yellow card) 51'; Lalhlimpuia 81' | Report | Kumar (yellow card) 30'; Mehta (yellow card) 83'; Brown (yellow card) 90+2' | Stadium: Sree Kanteerava Stadium; Attendance: 8,748; Referee: OP Thakur; Man of the Match: John Johnson (Bengaluru FC) |

| 6 April 2016 13 | DSK Shivajians | 1–1 | Bengaluru FC | Pune |
| 19:05 IST | Dipanda 37' | Report | Lyngdoh 34' (yellow card) 63'; Collins (yellow card) 40'; Johnson (yellow card) 44' | Stadium: Shree Shiv Chhatrapati Sports Complex; Referee: Venkatesh R Man of the Match: Subrata Pal (DSK Shivajians) |

| 10 April 2016 14 | Bengaluru FC | 3–1 | East Bengal | Bengaluru |
| 19:05 IST | Lyngdoh 28'; Chhetri (yellow card) 61'; Song-Yong 63'; Malsawmzuala 68' | Report | Saumik Dey (yellow card) 13'; Dong-hyun 27' (yellow card) 39'; Mendy (yellow card) 47'; Sehnaj Singh (yellow card) 87' | Stadium: Sree Kanteerava Stadium; Attendance: 11,145; Referee: C.R. Srikrishna; Man of the Match: Eugeneson Lyngdoh (Bengaluru FC) |

| 17 April 2016 15 | Bengaluru FC | 2–0 | Salgaocar | Bengaluru |
| 19:05 IST | Lyngdoh 8'; Malsawmzuala (yellow card) 35'; Anto (yellow card) 54'; George (yellow card) 76'; Doungel 88' | Report | T. Singh (yellow card) 17' (yellow-red card) 89'; M. Singh (yellow card) 29'; Éder (yellow card) 36' | Stadium: Sree Kanteerava Stadium; Attendance: 11,431; Referee: Rowan Arumughan; Man of the Match: John Johnson (Bengaluru FC) |

| 23 April 2016 16 | Mohun Bagan | 5–0 | Bengaluru FC | Siliguri |
| 19:05 IST | Glenn 8', 66'; Rodrigues 21'; Sabrosa 23'; Mallick 28' | Report | Pereira (yellow card) 33' (yellow-red card) 51'; Malsawmzuala (yellow card) 44' | Stadium: Kanchenjunga Stadium; Referee: Ajit Meetei; Man of the Match: Cornell Glenn (Mohun Bagan) |

Win Draw Loss Void Postponed

==== Table ====
| Pos | Team | Pld | W | D | L | GF | GA | GD | Pts | Qualification or relegation |
|---|---|---|---|---|---|---|---|---|---|---|
| 1 | Bengaluru (C) | 16 | 10 | 2 | 4 | 24 | 17 | +7 | 32 | Qualification to Champions League qualifying play-off |
| 2 | Mohun Bagan | 16 | 8 | 6 | 2 | 32 | 16 | +16 | 30 | Qualification to AFC Cup qualifying play-off (Note: Mohun Bagan qualified for the 2017 AFC Cup by winning the 2015–16 Federation Cup.) |
| 3 | East Bengal | 16 | 7 | 4 | 5 | 22 | 18 | +4 | 25 | |
| 4 | Sporting Goa | 16 | 5 | 7 | 4 | 24 | 20 | +4 | 22 | Withdrew (Note: Sporting Goa and Salgaocar withdrew from I-League.) |
| 5 | Mumbai | 16 | 4 | 7 | 5 | 20 | 19 | +1 | 19 | |

Source: I-League
Rules for classification: 1) points; 2) head-to-head points; 3) head-to-head goal difference; 4) goal difference; 5) number of goals scored; 6) play-off match
(C) Champions

==== Results summary ====
| Overall | | | | | | | | Home | | | | | | Away | | | | | |
| Pld | W | D | L | GF | GA | GD | Pts | W | D | L | GF | GA | GD | W | D | L | GF | GA | GD |
|---|---|---|---|---|---|---|---|---|---|---|---|---|---|---|---|---|---|---|---|
| 16 | 10 | 2 | 4 | 24 | 17 | +7 | 32 | 6 | 0 | 2 | 15 | 6 | +9 | 4 | 2 | 2 | 9 | 11 | −2 |

Source: I-League

==== Results by round ====
| Round | 1 | 2 | 3 | 4 | 5 | 6 | 7 | 8 | 9 | 10 | 11 | 12 | 13 | 14 | 15 | 16 |
|---|---|---|---|---|---|---|---|---|---|---|---|---|---|---|---|---|
| Ground | A | A | H | A | A | H | H | H | H | A | A | H | A | H | H | A |
| Result | W | W | W | L | W | L | W | L | W | W | D | W | D | W | W | L |
| Position | 3 | 2 | 1 | 1 | 1 | 1 | 1 | 1 | 2 | 2 | 2 | 2 | 2 | 1 | 1 | 1 |

Source: I-League
A = Away; H = Home; W = Win; D = Draw; L = Loss

=== AFC Cup ===
The draw for 2016 AFC Cup took place on 10 December 2015 and Bengaluru FC were placed in Group H alongside Malaysia Super League winner Johor Darul Ta'zim, Lao Premier League winner Lao Toyota FC and General Aung San Shield winner Ayeyawady United from Myanmar.

==== Group stage ====
Bengaluru FC started their campaign in the away game against Vietnamese team Lao Toyota F.C. A defensive lapse by Curtis Osano and an excellent free-kick just outside the penalty box from Phatthana Syvilay meant that Bengaluru were trailing by 2–0 at the 30 minutes mark. In the second half, Lao Toyota were reduced to 10 men, but Bengaluru were unable to capitalize on the chances created. However, C.K. Vineeth pulled one back in the stoppage time, and the score ended at 2–1 in the favour of the home team. Injury-ridden Bengaluru FC faced defending AFC cup champions Johor Darul Ta'zim at home. The game was decided by a solitary goal from Mohd Safiq Rahim in 55th minute and Bengaluru succumbed to second consecutive defeat in the AFC cup. Bengaluru FC finally secured its first win against Ayeyawady United when the solitary goal from the captain Sunil Chhetri in the first half was enough to secure 0–1 win for the team.

In the second half of the group stage, Bengaluru FC resumed the campaign against Ayeyawady United at home. In what turned out to be the highest scoring match involving Bengaluru FC, the home team won the game 5–3 in spite of missed chances and defensive blunders. Bengaluru FC registered their third consecutive win in the group stage with 2–1 home win against Lao Toyota. A goal each from Eugeneson Lyngdoh and Kim Song-Yong in each half took Bengaluru FC to a win and with the win the team also advanced to round of 16 for the second year in running. In the final game of the group stage, Bengaluru FC faced the group leader Johor Darul Ta'zim, who maintained their perfect record against Bengaluru FC with 3–0 win and handed them their third consecutive defeat.

| Pos | Team | Pld | W | D | L | GF | GA | GD | Pts | Qualification | JDT | BFC | AYE | LAO |
|---|---|---|---|---|---|---|---|---|---|---|---|---|---|---|
| 1 | (Malaysia) Johor Darul Ta'zim | 6 | 6 | 0 | 0 | 21 | 3 | +18 | 18 | Knockout stage | — | 3–0 | 8–1 | 3–0 |
| 2 | (India) Bengaluru | 6 | 3 | 0 | 3 | 9 | 10 | −1 | 9 | Knockout stage | 0–1 | — | 5–3 | 2–1 |
| 3 | (Myanmar) Ayeyawady United | 6 | 2 | 0 | 4 | 12 | 20 | −8 | 6 | | 1–2 | 0–1 | — | 4–2 |
| 4 | (Laos) Lao Toyota | 6 | 1 | 0 | 5 | 8 | 17 | −9 | 3 | | 1–4 | 2–1 | 2–3 | — |

Source: AFC
Rules for classification: Group stage tiebreakers

| 24 February 2016 | Lao Toyota FC (Laos) | 2–1 | (India) Bengaluru FC | Vientiane, Laos |
| 18:00 UTC+7 | Homma 2'; Syvilay 34'; Souksavath (yellow card) 64' (yellow-red card) 65' | Report | Collins (yellow card) 17'; Ralte (yellow card) 34'; Vineeth 90' | Stadium: New Laos National Stadium; Attendance: 800; Referee: Yu Ming-hsun (Chinese Taipei); MVP: Phatthana Syvilay (Lao Toyota) |

| 9 March 2016 | Bengaluru FC (India) | 0–1 | (Malaysia) Johor Darul Ta'zim | Bengaluru, India |
| | | Report | Azamuddin (yellow card) 50'; Safiq 55' | Stadium: Sree Kanteerava Stadium; Attendance: 2,792; Referee: Hussein Abo Yehia (Lebanon); MVP: Mohd Safiq Rahim (Johor Darul Ta'zim) |

| 16 March 2016 | Ayeyawady United (Myanmar) | 0–1 | (India) Bengaluru FC | Yangon, Myanmar |
| 16:00 UTC+6:30 | Agyeman (yellow card) 40'; Naing Oo (yellow card) 46'; Chizoba (yellow card) 55' | Report | Collins (yellow card) 20'; Chhetri 34' | Stadium: Thuwunna Stadium; Attendance: 300; Referee: Aziz Asimov (Uzbekistan); MVP: Sunil Chhetri (Bengaluru FC) |

| 13 April 2016 | Bengaluru FC (India) | 5–3 | (Myanmar) Ayeyawady United | Bengaluru, India |
| 19:00 UTC+5:30 | Vineeth 21'; Alwyn 61', 89'; Manju (yellow card) 54'; V. Kumar (yellow card) 55'; Doungel 66'; Beingaichho 69' | Report | Hein Thiha Zaw (yellow card) 30' (goal) 44'; Thu (yellow card) 55'; Thein (yellow card) 63'; Chizoba 69', 78' | Stadium: Sree Kanteerava Stadium; Attendance: 3,081; Referee: Kim Hee-gon (South Korea); MVP: Alwyn George (Bengaluru FC) |

| 27 April 2016 | Bengaluru FC (India) | 2–1 | (Laos) Lao Toyota FC | Bengaluru, India |
| 19:00 UTC+05:30 | Lalchhuanmawia (yellow card) 34'; Lyngdoh 45+1'; Song-Yong 60'; Sunil Chhetri (yellow card) 64'; Malsawmzuala (yellow card) 78' | Report | Phommapanya (yellow card) 64' (yellow-red card) 90'; Honma 67' | Stadium: Sree Kanteerava Stadium; Attendance: 2,487; Referee: Ho Wai Sing (Hong Kong); MVP: Eugeneson Lyngdoh (Bengaluru FC) |

| 11 May 2016 | Johor Darul Ta'zim (Malaysia) | 3–0 | (India) Bengaluru FC | Johor Bahru, Malaysia |
| 20:45 UTC+8 | Nawi (yellow card) 26'; Safiq 70'; Sali 78'; Shaari 90+1' (pen.) | Report | Song-Yong (yellow card) 32'; Lyngdoh (yellow card) 36'; Osano (yellow card) 45'; T. Singh (yellow card) 51'; Anto (yellow card) 90' | Stadium: Larkin Stadium; Attendance: 6,545; Referee: Turki Al-Khudhayr (Saudi Arabia); MVP: Safee Sali (Johor Darul Ta'zim) |

==== Knock-out stage ====
===== Round of 16 =====
Bengaluru FC faced Hong Kong team Kitchee SC, the group F winner, in the single-legged round of 16 game at the Mong Kok Stadium. After conceding early lead in 7th minute, Bengaluru FC came back strong and Sunil Chhetri scored two goals in succession. However, Kitchee equalized just before the half time and the first half ended at 2–2. Daniel Lalhlimpuia struck immediately in the second half and gave the lead back to Bengaluru FC in 51st minute. Even though Bengaluru FC missed a few easy chances in the second half, they managed to hold on to the lead and entered quarter-finals for the first time, played during 2016–17 season.

| 25 May 2016 Round of 16 | Kitchee (Hong Kong) | 2–3 | (India) Bengaluru FC | Hong Kong |
| 20:00 UTC+8 | Rufino 7'; Hoi (yellow card) 28'; Tarrés 42' | Report | Chhetri 31' (pen.), 33'; Lalhlimpuia 51' | Stadium: Mong Kok Stadium; Attendance: 2,806; Referee: Fu Ming (China); MVP: Sunil Chhetri (Bengaluru FC) |

=== Federation Cup ===
As the winner of 2015–16 I-League, Bengaluru FC were paired against 8th ranked team Aizawl F.C. for the quarter-final round. On 30 April 2016, in the first leg of quarter finals, Bengaluru FC took an early lead in 15th minute with a goal from Eugeneson Lyngdoh, however Alfred Jaryan equalized for the home team in 38th minute. Aizawl struck the final blow in the dying minutes when Joel Sunday scored the winner for the home team, leaving Bengaluru FC trailing after the first leg. Bengaluru FC suffered a shock defeat in the home leg as well, as the team went down 2–3 to Aizawl. C.K. Vineeth's first half equalizer and Sunil Chhetri's successful penalty proved insufficient as Bengaluru FC were ousted from the Federation cup on 3–5 aggregate loss.

| 30 April 2016 Quarter-finals | Aizawl | 2–1 | Bengaluru FC | Aizawl |
| 15:00 IST | Jaryan 38'; Sunday 90' | Report | Lyngdoh 15' | Stadium: Rajiv Gandhi Stadium; Referee: Ajit Dutta |

| 3 May 2016 Quarter-finals | Bengaluru FC | 2–3 (3–5 agg.) | Aizawl | Bengaluru |
| 21:00 IST | Vineeth 28'; Chhetri 74' (pen.) | Report | Sunday 26', 37'; Lalrinmuana 49' | Stadium: Sree Kanteerava Stadium; Attendance: 3,127 |

== Accolades ==
Ashley Westwood was adjudged Best Coach of I-League by All India Football Federation, whereas John Johnson won the Best Defender, Eugeneson Lyngdoh won the Best Midfielder, and Amrinder Singh won the Best Goalkeeper awards. Ashley Westwood was chosen as the Coach of the Year and Udanta Singh as Young Player of the Year by Football Players' Association of India. Bengaluru FC were also awarded Best Organizers by the I-League for the 2015–16 season. At Bengaluru FC award night, John Johnson was Players' Player of the season, and Rino Anto was awarded Fans' player of the season.

== Team management ==
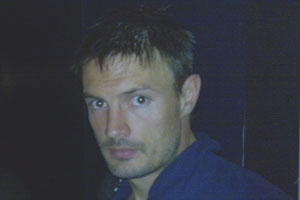
Ashley Westwood, the head coach Bengaluru FC for the third season

| Position | Name |
|---|---|
| Head coach | (England) Ashley Westwood |
| Assistant coach | (Scotland) Pradhyum Reddy |
| Goalkeeping coach | (Turkey) Ali Uzunhasanoglu |
| Head of Youth Development | (India) Richard Hood |
| Performance analyst | (England) Matt Holland |
| Head physiotherapist | (England) Samuel Coleman |
| Head of sports sciences | (England) Donavan Pillai |

== Player statistics ==
=== Appearances and goals ===
| No. | Pos | Nat | Player | Total | | I-League | | Federation Cup | | AFC | |
| No. | Pos | Nat | Player | Apps | Goals | Apps | Goals | Apps | Goals | Apps | Goals |
|---|---|---|---|---|---|---|---|---|---|---|---|
| 1 | GK | (India) IND | Amrinder Singh | 17 | 0 | 11+0 | 0 | 2+0 | 0 | 4+0 | 0 |
| 3 | DF | (India) IND | Nanjangud Shivananju Manju | 2 | 0 | 0+1 | 0 | 0+0 | 0 | 1+0 | 0 |
| 4 | DF | (Kenya) KEN | Curtis Osano | 21 | 1 | 16+0 | 1 | 2+0 | 0 | 3+0 | 0 |
| 5 | DF | (India) IND | Keegan Pereira | 13 | 0 | 7+1 | 0 | 1+0 | 0 | 4+0 | 0 |
| 6 | DF | (England) ENG | John Johnson | 22 | 0 | 14+0 | 0 | 2+0 | 0 | 6+0 | 0 |
| 7 | DF | (North Korea) PRK | Kim Song-Yong | 20 | 6 | 13+1 | 5 | 2+0 | 0 | 4+0 | 1 |
| 8 | DF | (England) ENG | Michael Collins | 18 | 0 | 10+0 | 0 | 2+0 | 0 | 6+0 | 0 |
| 11 | FW | (India) IND | Sunil Chhetri | 20 | 9 | 14+0 | 5 | 2+0 | 1 | 4+0 | 3 |
| 12 | MF | (India) IND | Thoi Singh | 19 | 0 | 10+3 | 0 | 0+1 | 0 | 3+2 | 0 |
| 13 | DF | (India) IND | Rino Anto | 23 | 0 | 15+1 | 0 | 1+0 | 0 | 5+1 | 0 |
| 14 | MF | (India) IND | Eugeneson Lyngdoh | 13 | 5 | 8+0 | 3 | 2+0 | 1 | 3+0 | 1 |
| 15 | DF | (India) IND | Vishal Kumar | 2 | 0 | 0+0 | 0 | 0+0 | 0 | 2+0 | 0 |
| 16 | MF | (India) IND | Shankar Sampingiraj | 8 | 1 | 5+2 | 1 | 0+0 | 0 | 1+0 | 0 |
| 17 | FW | (India) IND | Seminlen Doungel | 17 | 3 | 4+9 | 2 | 0+0 | 0 | 2+2 | 1 |
| 18 | MF | (India) IND | Beikhokhei Beingaichho | 6 | 1 | 3+1 | 0 | 0+0 | 0 | 1+1 | 1 |
| 19 | MF | (India) IND | Siam Hanghal | 5 | 0 | 2+0 | 0 | 0+0 | 0 | 3+0 | 0 |
| 20 | MF | (India) IND | Alwyn George | 11 | 2 | 4+2 | 0 | 0+0 | 0 | 4+1 | 2 |
| 21 | FW | (India) IND | Udanta Singh | 21 | 1 | 6+6 | 1 | 1+1 | 0 | 5+2 | 0 |
| 22 | DF | (India) IND | Nishu Kumar | 4 | 0 | 1+0 | 0 | 1+0 | 0 | 1+1 | 0 |
| 23 | DF | (India) IND | Lalchhuan Mawia | 21 | 0 | 11+1 | 0 | 1+1 | 0 | 6+1 | 0 |
| 24 | DF | (India) IND | Salam Ranjan Singh | 5 | 0 | 0+3 | 0 | 0+0 | 0 | 1+1 | 0 |
| 25 | FW | (India) IND | Daniel Lalhlimpuia | 13 | 2 | 1+4 | 1 | 0+2 | 0 | 2+4 | 1 |
| 28 | GK | (India) IND | Lalthuammawia Ralte | 8 | 0 | 5+0 | 0 | 0+0 | 0 | 3+0 | 0 |
| 29 | MF | (India) IND | Malsawmzuala | 14 | 1 | 7+3 | 1 | 2+0 | 0 | 1+1 | 0 |
| 31 | MF | (India) IND | C.K. Vineeth | 20 | 7 | 9+5 | 4 | 1+1 | 1 | 2+2 | 2 |

- Source: soccerway

Updated: 25 May 2016

=== Top scorers ===
| Rank | No. | Pos | Nat | Player | I-League | AFC | Federation Cup | Total |
|---|---|---|---|---|---|---|---|---|
| 1 | 11 | FW | (India) | Sunil Chhetri | 5 | 3 | 1 | 9 |
| 2 | 31 | MF | (India) | C.K. Vineeth | 4 | 2 | 1 | 7 |
| 3 | 7 | FW | (North Korea) | Kim Song-Yong | 5 | 1 | 0 | 6 |
| 4 | 14 | MF | (India) | Eugeneson Lyngdoh | 3 | 1 | 1 | 5 |
| 5 | 17 | FW | (India) | Seminlen Doungel | 2 | 1 | 0 | 3 |
| 6 | 20 | MF | (India) | Alwyn George | 0 | 2 | 0 | 2 |
| 6 | 25 | FW | (India) | Daniel Lalhlimpuia | 1 | 1 | 0 | 2 |
| 8 | 4 | DF | (Kenya) | Curtis Osano | 1 | 0 | 0 | 1 |
| 8 | 16 | MF | (India) | Shankar Sampingiraj | 1 | 0 | 0 | 1 |
| 8 | 17 | FW | (India) | Udanta Singh | 1 | 0 | 0 | 1 |
| 8 | 18 | MF | (India) | Beikhokhei Beingaichho | 0 | 1 | 0 | 1 |
| 8 | 28 | MF | (India) | Malsawmzuala | 1 | 0 | 0 | 1 |
| TOTALS | | | | | 24 | 12 | 3 | 39 |

Source: soccerway
Updated: 25 May 2016

=== Clean sheets ===
| Rank | No. | Pos | Nat | Player | I-League | AFC | Federation Cup | Total |
|---|---|---|---|---|---|---|---|---|
| 1 | 1 | GK | (India) | Amrinder Singh | 5 | 1 | 0 | 6 |
| 2 | 28 | GK | (India) | Lalthuammawia Ralte | 2 | 0 | 0 | 2 |
| TOTALS | | | | | 7 | 1 | 0 | 8 |

Source: soccerway
Updated: 25 May 2016

=== Disciplinary record ===
| Rank | No. | Pos | Nat | Player | I-League | | AFC | | Total | | Notes |
| Rank | No. | Pos | Nat | Player | Yellow card | Red card | Yellow card | Red card | Yellow card | Red card | Notes |
|---|---|---|---|---|---|---|---|---|---|---|---|
| 1 | 4 | DF | (Kenya) | Curtis Osano | 3 | 0 | 1 | 0 | 4 | 0 | |
| 1 | 6 | DF | (England) | John Johnson | 4 | 0 | 0 | 0 | 4 | 0 | Missed a game, against East Bengal (4 yellow cards) (10 April 2016) |
| 1 | 8 | MF | (Republic of Ireland) | Michael Collins | 2 | 0 | 2 | 0 | 4 | 0 | Missed a game, against Ayeyawady United (2 yellow cards) (13 April 2016) |
| 1 | 23 | DF | (India) | Lalchhuanmawia | 2 | 1 | 1 | 0 | 3 | 1 | Missed a game, against Aizawl (red card) (28 February 2016) |
| 5 | 11 | FW | (India) | Sunil Chhetri | 2 | 0 | 1 | 0 | 3 | 0 | |
| 5 | 30 | MF | (India) | Malsawmzuala | 2 | 0 | 1 | 0 | 3 | 0 | |
| 5 | 12 | MF | (India) | Thoi Singh | 2 | 0 | 1 | 0 | 3 | 0 | |
| 5 | 14 | MF | (India) | Eugeneson Lyngdoh | 2 | 0 | 1 | 0 | 3 | 0 | |
| 5 | 23 | DF | (India) | Rino Anto | 2 | 0 | 1 | 0 | 3 | 0 | |
| 10 | 17 | FW | (India) | Seminlen Doungel | 2 | 0 | 0 | 0 | 2 | 0 | |
| 10 | 20 | MF | (India) | Alwyn George | 2 | 0 | 0 | 0 | 2 | 0 | |
| 12 | 3 | DF | (India) | Nanjangud Shivananju Manju | 0 | 0 | 1 | 0 | 1 | 0 | |
| 12 | 5 | DF | (India) | Keegan Pereira | 0 | 1 | 0 | 0 | 0 | 1 | Missed a game, against Aizawl (red card) (30 April 2016) |
| 12 | 7 | FW | (North Korea) | Kim Song-Yong | 0 | 0 | 1 | 0 | 1 | 0 | |
| 12 | 15 | DF | (India) | Vishal Kumar | 0 | 0 | 1 | 0 | 1 | 0 | |
| 12 | 28 | GK | (India) | Lalthuammawia Ralte | 0 | 0 | 1 | 0 | 1 | 0 | |
| 12 | 31 | MF | (India) | C.K. Vineeth | 1 | 0 | 0 | 0 | 1 | 0 | |
| TOTALS | | | | | 26 | 2 | 13 | 0 | 39 | 2 | |

Source: soccerway
Updated: 25 May 2016

== See also ==
- 2015–16 in Indian football
